= 2025–26 curling season =

- Sport: Curling

Seasons
- ← 2024–25 2026–27 →

The 2025–26 curling season began in May 2025 and ended in May 2026 (in Japan ends in June 2026).

== World Curling Federation events ==
=== Championships ===
Event			Gold	Silver	Bronze
Pan Continental Curling Championships; Virginia & Eveleth, Minnesota, United States, Oct. 19–26	A	M	Canada (Jacobs)	United States (Shuster)	Japan (Yamaguchi)
Pan Continental Curling Championships; Virginia & Eveleth, Minnesota, United States, Oct. 19–26	A	W	China (Wang)	Canada (Homan)	South Korea (Gim)
Pan Continental Curling Championships; Virginia & Eveleth, Minnesota, United States, Oct. 19–26	B	M	Hong Kong (Chang)	Kazakhstan (Zhuzbay)	Guyana (Husain)
Pan Continental Curling Championships; Virginia & Eveleth, Minnesota, United States, Oct. 19–26	B	W	Philippines (Dubberstein)	Kazakhstan (Ebauyer)	Hong Kong (Hung)
European Curling Championships; Lohja & Lahti, Finland, Nov. 22–29	A	M	Sweden (Edin)	Switzerland (Schwaller)	Scotland (Mouat)
European Curling Championships; Lohja & Lahti, Finland, Nov. 22–29	A	W	Sweden (Hasselborg)	Scotland (Jackson)	Switzerland (Hürlimann)
European Curling Championships; Lohja & Lahti, Finland, Nov. 22–29	B	M	Belgium (Verreycken)	Spain (Vez)	Turkey (Karagöz)
European Curling Championships; Lohja & Lahti, Finland, Nov. 22–29	B	W	Latvia (Barone)	Estonia (Laidsalu)	England (Farnell)
World Junior-B Curling Championships; Lohja, Finland, Dec. 7–20		M	United States (Hebert)	Switzerland (Lüthold)	Poland (Rokita)
World Junior-B Curling Championships; Lohja, Finland, Dec. 7–20		W	Japan (Miura)	United States (Johnson)	Turkey (Cömert)
2026 Winter Olympics; Cortina d'Ampezzo, Italy, Feb. 4–22		M	Canada (Jacobs)	Great Britain (Mouat)	Switzerland (Schwaller)
2026 Winter Olympics; Cortina d'Ampezzo, Italy, Feb. 4–22		W	Sweden (Hasselborg)	Switzerland (Tirinzoni)	Canada (Homan)
2026 Winter Olympics; Cortina d'Ampezzo, Italy, Feb. 4–22		MD	Sweden (Wranå / Wranå)	United States (Thiesse / Dropkin)	Italy (Constantini / Mosaner)
World Junior Curling Championships; Tårnby, Denmark, Feb. 24 – Mar. 3		M	United States (Hebert)	Italy (Spiller)	Scotland (Carson)
World Junior Curling Championships; Tårnby, Denmark, Feb. 24 – Mar. 3		W	South Korea (Kang)	Sweden (Dryburgh)	China (Wang)
2026 Winter Paralympics; Cortina d'Ampezzo, Italy, Mar. 4–14		Mx	Canada (Ideson)	China (Wang)	Sweden (Petersson-Dahl)
2026 Winter Paralympics; Cortina d'Ampezzo, Italy, Mar. 4–14		MD	China (Wang / Yang)	South Korea (Baek / Lee)	Latvia (Rožkova / Lasmans)
World Women's Curling Championship; Calgary, Alberta, Canada, Mar. 14–22			Switzerland (Schwaller)	Canada (Einarson)	Sweden (Wranå)
World Men's Curling Championship; Ogden, Utah, United States, Mar. 27 – Apr. 4			Sweden (Edin)	Canada (Dunstone)	Scotland (Whyte)
World Senior Curling Championships; Geneva, Switzerland, Apr. 24 – May 2		M	United States (Farbelow)	Scotland (Brewster)	Canada (Korte)
World Senior Curling Championships; Geneva, Switzerland, Apr. 24 – May 2		W	Scotland (Lockhart)	Germany (Belkofer-Kröhnert)	Canada (Middaugh)
World Mixed Doubles Curling Championship; Geneva, Switzerland, Apr. 25 – May 2			Australia (Gill / Hewitt)	Sweden (Westman / Ahlberg)	Canada (Lott / Lott)
World Junior Mixed Doubles Curling Championship; Edmonton, Alberta, Canada, May 5–10			Japan (Miura / Fujii)	Canada (Ideson / Henry)	Scotland (Laurie / Brewster)

=== Qualification events ===
Event		Qualifiers
Pre-Olympic Qualification Event; Aberdeen, Scotland, Oct. 7–11	M	Philippines; Poland; New Zealand
Pre-Olympic Qualification Event; Aberdeen, Scotland, Oct. 7–11	W	Czech Republic; Germany; Australia
Olympic Qualification Event; Kelowna, Canada, Dec. 5–18	M	United States; China
Olympic Qualification Event; Kelowna, Canada, Dec. 5–18	W	Japan; United States
Olympic Qualification Event; Kelowna, Canada, Dec. 5–18	MD	Czech Republic; South Korea
World Mixed Doubles Qualification Event; Dumfries, Scotland, Jan. 5–10		Netherlands; Hungary; France; China
World Championship Pre-Qualifier (Pan Continental); Dumfries, Scotland, April 13–16	M	Mexico; India
World Championship Pre-Qualifier (Europe); Ljubljana, Slovenia, May 5–11	M	Slovenia; Latvia
World Championship Pre-Qualifier (Europe); Ljubljana, Slovenia, May 5–11	W	France; Poland

== Other events ==
Event		Winning team	Runner-up team
United States Pan Continental Qualifier; Chaska, Minnesota, Aug. 8–10	M	(Minnesota) John Shuster	(Minnesota) Korey Dropkin
United States Pan Continental Qualifier; Chaska, Minnesota, Aug. 8–10	W	(Minnesota) Tabitha Peterson	(Michigan) Delaney Strouse
United States Olympic Curling Team Pre-Trials; Charlotte, North Carolina (men's), Sep. 11–13; Chaska, Minnesota (women's), Sep. 12–14	M	(Wisconsin) Caden Hebert	(Minnesota) Chase Sinnett
United States Olympic Curling Team Pre-Trials; Charlotte, North Carolina (men's), Sep. 11–13; Chaska, Minnesota (women's), Sep. 12–14	W	(Minnesota) Allory Johnson	(North Dakota) Christine McMakin
Japanese Olympic Curling Team Trials; Wakkanai, Japan, Sep. 11–14	M	(Nagano Prefecture) Tsuyoshi Yamaguchi	(Hokkaido) Shinya Abe
Japanese Olympic Curling Team Trials; Wakkanai, Japan, Sep. 11–14	W	(Hokkaido) Sayaka Yoshimura	(Nagano Prefecture) Miyu Ueno
GSOC Wheelchair Curling Invitational; Waterloo & London, Ontario, Sep. 24–28		Canada Red	(United Kingdom) Great Britain
Japanese Olympic Mixed Doubles Curling Trials; Wakkanai, Japan, Sep. 25–28		(Yamanashi Prefecture) (Hokkaido) Koana / Aoki	(Nagano Prefecture) (Hokkaido) Matsumura / Tanida
Czech Olympic Mixed Doubles Curling Trials; Prague, Czech Republic, Sep. 26–28		(Prague) Zelingrová / Chabičovský	(Prague) Paulová / Paul
Chairman's Cup; Uiseong, South Korea, Nov. 11–13	M	Jeong Byeong-jin	Park Jong-duk
Chairman's Cup; Uiseong, South Korea, Nov. 11–13	W	Kim Su-hyeon	Park You-been
United States Olympic Curling Team Trials; Sioux Falls, South Dakota Nov. 11–16	M	(Minnesota) Daniel Casper	(Minnesota) John Shuster
United States Olympic Curling Team Trials; Sioux Falls, South Dakota Nov. 11–16	W	(Minnesota) Tabitha Peterson	(New Hampshire) Elizabeth Cousins
Rock League; Toronto, Ontario Apr. 6–12		🦌 Shield Curling Club (Jacobs)	🐉 Typhoon Curling Club (Yoshida)
Uiseong Governor's Cup; Uiseong, South Korea, Apr. 17–21	M	Lee Jae-beom	Kim Chang-min
Uiseong Governor's Cup; Uiseong, South Korea, Apr. 17–21	W	Kang Bo-bae	Gim Eun-ji

== Curling Canada events ==
=== Championships ===
Event		Gold	Silver	Bronze
Canadian Mixed Curling Championship; Assiniboia, Saskatchewan, Nov. 2–8		New Brunswick (Comeau)	Ontario (Mooibroek)	Saskatchewan (Ackerman)
Canadian Curling Club Championships; Winnipeg, Manitoba, Nov. 18–23	M	British Columbia (Young)	Newfoundland and Labrador (Noseworthy)	Ontario (Cochrane)
Canadian Curling Club Championships; Winnipeg, Manitoba, Nov. 18–23	W	Ontario (Thorne)	Quebec (Perron)	New Brunswick (Gaines)
Montana's Canadian Curling Trials; Halifax, Nova Scotia, Nov. 22–29	M	(Alberta) Brad Jacobs	(Manitoba) Matt Dunstone	(Saskatchewan) Mike McEwen
Montana's Canadian Curling Trials; Halifax, Nova Scotia, Nov. 22–29	W	(Ontario) Rachel Homan	(Nova Scotia) Christina Black	(Manitoba) Kerri Einarson
Canadian Senior Curling Championships; Ottawa, Ontario, Nov. 29 – Dec. 6	M	Saskatchewan (Korte)	Ontario (Harris)	New Brunswick (Grattan)
Canadian Senior Curling Championships; Ottawa, Ontario, Nov. 29 – Dec. 6	W	Ontario (Middaugh)	Saskatchewan (Holland)	British Columbia (Cowan)
Scotties Tournament of Hearts; Mississauga, Ontario, Jan. 23 – Feb. 1		Canada (Einarson)	Manitoba (Lawes)	Alberta (Sturmay)
Canadian U18 Curling Championships; Timmins, Ontario, Feb. 8–14	M	Quebec 1 (Tremblay)	Ontario 2 (Genjaga)	Ontario 1 (MacTavish)
Canadian U18 Curling Championships; Timmins, Ontario, Feb. 8–14	W	Saskatchewan (Wood)	Ontario 1 (Wilson)	Manitoba 2 (McPherson)
U Sports/Curling Canada University Curling Championships; Regina, Saskatchewan, Feb. 17–21	M	(Alberta) Calgary Dinos (Wipf)	(Ontario) Carleton Ravens (Nicholls)	Alberta Golden Bears (Davies)
U Sports/Curling Canada University Curling Championships; Regina, Saskatchewan, Feb. 17–21	W	(Newfoundland and Labrador) Memorial Sea-Hawks (Locke)	(Ontario) McMaster Marauders (Fitzgerald)	Alberta Pandas (Richards)
CCAA/Curling Canada College Curling Championships; Regina, Saskatchewan, Feb. 17–21	M	(Ontario) Humber Hawks (Garner)	(Alberta) NAIT Ooks (van Amsterdam)	(Quebec) Gaillards du Cégep (Bédard)
CCAA/Curling Canada College Curling Championships; Regina, Saskatchewan, Feb. 17–21	W	(Alberta) Red Deer Polytechnic Queens (Blair)	(Alberta) SAIT Trojans (Scoffin)	(British Columbia) PACWEST (Bowles)
Montana's Brier; St John's, Newfoundland and Labrador, Feb. 27 – Mar. 8		Manitoba (Dunstone)	Alberta (Koe)	Canada (Jacobs)
Canadian Mixed Doubles Curling Championship; Surrey, British Columbia, Mar. 21–27		(Alberta) (Ontario) Gray-Withers / Pietrangelo	(Alberta) Cinnamon / Tao	(Ontario) Ford / Campbell (Alberta) Homan / Bottcher
Canadian Under-21 Mixed Doubles Championship; Sudbury, Ontario, Mar. 24–27		(Ontario) Ideson / Henry	(Alberta) Evans / Dalrymple	(Alberta) Richards / Davies
Canadian Junior Curling Championships; Sudbury, Ontario, Mar. 28 – Apr. 4	M	Ontario 1 (MacDougall)	Alberta 1 (Hlushak)	Quebec (Tremblay)
Canadian Junior Curling Championships; Sudbury, Ontario, Mar. 28 – Apr. 4	W	Quebec 2 (Fortin)	Manitoba (Hayward)	Nova Scotia 1 (Blades)
Canadian Wheelchair Curling Championship; Boucherville, Quebec, Apr. 27 – May 2		Quebec 1 (Marquis)	Northern Ontario (Dean)	Saskatchewan (Wright)

=== Qualification events ===
Event		Qualifiers
Home Hardware Olympic Pre-Trials; Wolfville, Nova Scotia, Oct. 20–26	M	(Manitoba) Jordon McDonald
Home Hardware Olympic Pre-Trials; Wolfville, Nova Scotia, Oct. 20–26	W	(Alberta) Selena Sturmay
Under-21 Mixed Doubles Qualifiers; Nov. 26–30; Guelph, Ontario (East); Richmond, British Columbia (West)	East	(Quebec) Lafrance / Tremblay (Ontario) Ideson / Henry (Nova Scotia) McDonah / McCurdy (Ontario) Marcolini / Jewell
Under-21 Mixed Doubles Qualifiers; Nov. 26–30; Guelph, Ontario (East); Richmond, British Columbia (West)	West	(Alberta) Richards / Davies (Alberta) Evans / Dalrymple (Alberta) Yarmuch / Sawiak (Alberta) Yarmuch / Hlushak

=== Invitationals ===
Event		Winning skip	Runner-up skip
2025 U25 NextGen Classic; Edmonton, Alberta, Aug. 26–31	M	(Ontario) Sam Mooibroek	(Manitoba) Jordon McDonald
2025 U25 NextGen Classic; Edmonton, Alberta, Aug. 26–31	W	(Alberta) Serena Gray-Withers	(New Brunswick) Mélodie Forsythe
2025 U25 NextGen Classic; Edmonton, Alberta, Aug. 26–31	MD	(Alberta) (Ontario) Gray-Withers / Pietrangelo	(Ontario) Cave / King
PointsBet Invitational; Calgary, Alberta, Oct. 1–5	M	(Manitoba) Matt Dunstone	(Alberta) Brad Jacobs
PointsBet Invitational; Calgary, Alberta, Oct. 1–5	W	(Ontario) Rachel Homan	(British Columbia) Corryn Brown
2026 U25 NextGen Classic; Edmonton, Alberta, Apr. 25–28	M	(Manitoba) Jordon McDonald	(Ontario) Daniel Hocevar
2026 U25 NextGen Classic; Edmonton, Alberta, Apr. 25–28	W	(Alberta) Gracelyn Richards	(Manitoba) Shaela Hayward

=== Provincial and Territorial Playdowns ===
Province/ Territory	Women			Men		
Province/ Territory	Event	Champion	Runner-up	Event	Champion	Runner-up
Alberta; Okotoks, Jan. 5–11	Alberta Women's Championship	Selena Sturmay	Serena Gray-Withers	Alberta Men's Championship	Kevin Koe	Johnson Tao
British Columbia; Esquimalt, Dec. 30 – Jan. 4	BC Women's Championship	Taylor Reese-Hansen	Corryn Brown	BC Men's Championship	Cody Tanaka	Jason Montgomery
Manitoba; Rivers, Dec. 31 – Jan. 4 (Women's); Selkirk, Feb. 4–8 (Men's)	RME Women of the Rings	Kelsey Calvert	Selena Njegovan	Bunge Championship	Braden Calvert	Jordon McDonald
New Brunswick; Fredericton, Dec. 3–7 (Women's); Oromocto, Jan. 28 – Feb. 1 (Men's)	New Brunswick; Women's Championship	Mélodie Forsythe	Andrea Kelly	New Brunswick Tankard	James Grattan	Jamie Stewart
Newfoundland and Labrador; St. John's, Jan. 2–6 (Women's); Jan. 20–25 (Men's)	Newfoundland and Labrador; Women's Championship	Mackenzie Mitchell	Cailey Locke	Newfoundland and Labrador Tankard	Nathan Young	Simon Perry
Northern Ontario; North Bay, Jan. 6–11	Northern Ontario; Women's Championship	Krista Scharf	Robyn Despins	Northern Ontario; Men's Provincial Championship	Dustin Montpellier	John Epping
Northwest Territories; Inuvik, Dec. 18–21 (Women's); Yellowknife, Jan. 22–25 (Men's)	NWT Women's Championship	Nicky Kaufman	Betti Delorey	NWT Men's Championship	Jamie Koe	Aaron Bartling
Nova Scotia; Halifax, Jan. 6–11	Ocean Contractors; Women's Championship	Taylour Stevens	Isabelle Ladouceur	Ocean Contractors; Men's Championship	Kendal Thompson	Owen Purcell
Nunavut; Jan. 8–10	Nunavut; Women's Championship	Julia Weagle	—	Nunavut Men's Championship	Derek Samagalski	Shane Latimer
Ontario; Elmira, Jan. 4–11	Ontario Women's Championship	Hailey Armstrong	Danielle Inglis	Ontario Men's Championship	Jayden King	Sam Mooibroek
Prince Edward Island; Montague, Jan. 2–5	PEI Women's Championship	Amanda Power	Hillary Selkirk	PEI Men's Championship	Tyler Smith	Jamie Newson
Quebec; Rimouski, Jan. 4–11	Quebec; Women's Championship	Jolianne Fortin	Sarah Daniels	Quebec Tankard	Jean-Michel Ménard	Julien Tremblay
Saskatchewan; Melville, Jan. 5–11	Bunge Prairie Pinnacle	Jolene Campbell	Jana Tisdale	SaskTel Tankard	Kelly Knapp	Rylan Kleiter
Yukon; Whitehorse, Jan. 8–10	Yukon Women's Championship	Bayly Scoffin	—	Yukon Men's Championship	Thomas Scoffin	Dean Grindheim

== National championships ==
=== Australia ===
Event		Gold	Silver	Bronze
Australian Men's Curling Championship; Naseby, New Zealand, May 15–20		Hugh Millikin	Dustin Armstrong	Andrew Collins
Australian Women's Curling Championship; Naseby, New Zealand, May 15–20		Helen Williams	Anne Powell	Amanda Hluschak
Australian Mixed Doubles Curling Championship; Naseby, New Zealand, May 21–25		T. Gill / Hewitt	Westhagen / Panoussi	C. Millikin / H. Millikin
Australian Junior Curling Championships; Naseby, New Zealand, July 13–18	M	Thomas Bence	William Nathan	–
Australian Junior Curling Championships; Naseby, New Zealand, July 13–18	W	Holly Douglas	Alexandra Webster	–
Australian Junior Mixed Doubles Curling Championship; Naseby, New Zealand, July 13–18		Forge / Bence	Douglas / Collins	Douglas / Quinn
Australian Senior Curling Championships; Naseby, New Zealand, July 13–18	M	Hugh Millikin	Clive Webster	Jim Hansen
Australian Senior Curling Championships; Naseby, New Zealand, July 13–18	W	Helen Williams	Anne Powell	–

=== Czech Republic ===
Event		Gold	Silver	Bronze
Czech Junior Mixed Doubles Curling Championship; Prague, Oct. 18—20		Sofie Krupičková / Ondřej Blaha	Ema Košáková / Tobiáš Votava coach: Martin Votava	Matylda Volfová / Vojtěch Švec
Czech Mixed Doubles Curling Championship; Prague, Feb. 27 – Mar. 3		Petra Klímová / Lukáš Klíma	Julie Zelingrová / Vít Chabičovský	Klára Cihlářová / Tomáš Macek
Czech Junior Curling Championships; Prague, Feb. 6–9	M			
Czech Junior Curling Championships; Prague, Feb. 6–9	W			
Czech Men's Curling Championship; Prague, Mar. 12–17		Lukáš Klíma	Dalibor Miklík	Danila Liamaev
Czech Women's Curling Championship; Prague, Mar. 26–31				
Czech Mixed Curling Championship; Brno, Apr. 16–19				
Czech Wheelchair Curling Championship; Prague, Apr. 17–19				

=== Denmark ===
Event		Gold	Silver	Bronze
Danish Mixed Curling Championship; Hvidovre, Oct. 3–5		Liam Goldbeck	Søren Tidmand	Henrik Holtermann
Danish Mixed Doubles Curling Championship; Gentofte, Oct. 31 – Nov. 2		Natalie Wiksten / Kasper Wiksten	Jasmin Holtermann / Henrik Holtermann	Caroline Rasmussen / Liam Goldbeck
Danish Senior Curling Championships; Esbjerg, Dec. 12–14	M	Søren Tidmand	Hans Peter Schack	Bernd Hausted
Danish Senior Curling Championships; Esbjerg, Dec. 12–14	W	Kamilla Schack	Louise Zimmer	Camilla Søndergaard-Nielsen
Danish Junior Mixed Doubles Curling Championship; Gentofte, Jan. 30 – Feb. 1		Katrine Schmidt / Jacob Schmidt	Natalie Wiksten / Alexander Qvist	Nikki Jensen / Frederik Funck-Bjørnstrup
Danish Men's Curling Championship; Hvidovre, Mar. 6–8		Rasmus Stjerne	Jacob Schmidt	Nikki Jensen
Danish Women's Curling Championship; Hvidovre, Mar. 6–8		Madeleine Dupont	Camilla Søndergaard-Nielsen	Signe Schack
Danish Junior Curling Championships; Gentofte, Mar. 13–15	M			
Danish Junior Curling Championships; Gentofte, Mar. 13–15	W			
Danish Wheelchair Mixed Doubles Curling Championship; Gentofte, Mar. 13–15				

=== Estonia ===
Event	Gold	Silver	Bronze
Estonian Men's Curling Championship; Tallinn, Feb. 26 – Mar. 1	Erkki Lill	Kaarel Holm	Eduard Weltsman
Estonian Women's Curling Championship; Tallinn, Feb. 26 – Mar. 1	Liisa Turmann	Hettel Weddro	Margit Peebo
Estonian Mixed Doubles Curling Championship; Tallinn, Mar. 18–22	Marie Kaldvee / Harri Lill	Hettel Weddro / Aleksander Andre	Triin Madisson / Karl Kukner
Estonian Mixed Curling Championship; Tallinn, May 8–10	Harri Lill	Margus Tubalkain	Karl Kukner

=== Finland ===
Event		Gold	Silver	Bronze
Finnish Wheelchair Mixed Doubles Curling Championship; Hyvinkää, Oct. 3–4		Valeriina Silas / Juha Rajala	Tiina Pajunoja / Teemu Klasila	Tiia Tallgren / Yrjö Jääskeläinen
Finnish Senior Curling Championships; Hyvinkää, Nov. 6-9	M	Olli Rissanen	Tomi Rantamäki	Jussi Uusipaavalniemi
Finnish Senior Curling Championships; Hyvinkää, Nov. 6-9	W	Mari Wickström	Taru Oksanen	Tiina Julkunen
Finnish Mixed Doubles Curling Championship; Hyvinkää, Jan. 8–11		Lotta Immonen / Markus Sipilä	Susanna Säntti / Iikko Säntti	Jenni Merovuo / Ville Forsström
Finnish Women's Curling Championship; Hyvinkää, Jan. 30 - Feb. 1		Jenni Bäckman	Mari Wickström	Milja Sullanmaa
Finnish Wheelchair Curling Championship; Harjavalta, Feb. 13–15				
Finnish Men's Curling Championship; Joensuu, Oct. 17–19, Turku, Jan. 16–18, Hyvinkää, Mar. 5-8		Paavo Kuosmanen	Matias Hänninen	Jermu Pöllänen
Finnish Mixed Curling Championship; Hyvinkää, Apr. 9–12				

=== Italy ===
Event	Gold	Silver	Bronze
Italian Mixed Curling Championship; Pinerolo, Nov. 22–23 & Dec. 20-21 (Round Robin); Claut, Mar. 21–22 (Final)	Simone Gonin	Barbara Gentile	Radha Singh Torta
Italian Women's Curling Championship; Cembra & Pinerolo, Nov. 8–9, 29 (Qualification); Brunico, Apr. 3–4 (Final)	Stefania Constantini	Rebecca Mariani	Camilla Gilberti
Italian Mixed Doubles Curling Championship; Cembra, Apr. 9–12	Giorgia Maurino / Simone Gonin	Rachele Scalesse / Alberto Pimpini	Giada Zambelli / Francesco De Zanna
Italian Men's Curling Championship; Claut, Nov. 1–2 & Chembra, Jan. 9-11 (Qualification); Brunico, Apr. 16–19 (Final)	Stefano Spiller	Alberto Pimpini	Giacomo Colli

=== Japan ===
Event		Gold	Silver	Bronze
Japan Mixed Doubles Curling Championship; Aomori, Mar. 3–8		(Yamanashi Prefecture) Koana / (Hokkaido) Aoki	(Nagano Prefecture) Matsumura / (Hokkaido) Tanida	(Aomori Prefecture) Ichinohe / Suzuki
Japan Curling Championships; Yokohama, Kanagawa, Jun. 7–14	M	(Nagano Prefecture) Tsuyoshi Yamaguchi	(Hokkaido) Takumi Maeda	(Nagano Prefecture) Kaito Fujii
Japan Curling Championships; Yokohama, Kanagawa, Jun. 7–14	W	(Nagano Prefecture) Miyu Ueno	(Hokkaido) Miku Nihira	(Hokkaido) Sayaka Yoshimura

=== Latvia ===
Event		Gold	Silver	Bronze
Latvian Senior Curling Championships; Riga, Oct. 24-26	M			
Latvian Senior Curling Championships; Riga, Oct. 24-26	W			
Latvian Mixed Doubles Curling Championship; Riga, Jan. 22-25		Katrīna Gaidule / Roberts Reinis Buncis	Viktorija Sčepaviča / Arnis Veidemanis	Betija Gulbe / Ritvars Gulbis
Latvian Junior Mixed Doubles Curling Championship; Riga, Jan. 29 - Feb. 1				
Latvian Men's Curling Championship; Riga, Feb. 4-8		CC Rīga/Veidemanis (Arnis Veidemanis)	CC Rīga/Trukšāns (Mārtiņš Trukšāns)	TKK/Zass (Kristaps Zass)
Latvian Junior Curling Championships; Riga, Mar. 12-15	M			
Latvian Junior Curling Championships; Riga, Mar. 12-15	W			
Latvian Mixed Curling Championship; Riga, Mar. 25-29		KKR/Buncis (Roberts Reinis Buncis)	SK OB/Regža An. (Ansis Regža)	SK OB/Regža Ag. (Agate Regža)
Latvian Wheelchair Mixed Doubles Curling Championship; Riga, Apr. 20–26		Linda Meijere / Ojārs Briedis	Poļina Rožkova / Agris Lasmans	Adelaida Killiane / Mikus Ozols
Latvian Wheelchair Curling Championship; Riga, May. 4–6				
Latvian Women's Curling Championship; Riga, May 13-17		JKK/Barone (Evelīna Barone)	VKK/Blumberga-Bērziņa (Santa Blumberga-Bērziņa)	SK OB/Regža (Evita Regža)

=== New Zealand ===
Event	Gold	Silver	Bronze
New Zealand Mixed Curling Championship; Auckland, May. 31 – Jun. 2	Brett Sargon	Rachael Pitts	Jack Millar
New Zealand Men's Curling Championship; Naseby, Jun. 25–29	Sean Becker	Peter de Boer	Sam Flanagan
New Zealand Women's Curling Championship; Naseby, Jun. 25–29	Bridget Becker	Olivia Russell	Jessica Smith
New Zealand Junior Mixed Doubles Championship; Dunedin, Jul. 17–20	Ellie McKenzie / Jed Nevill	Tahlia Petersen / William Loe	Olivia Russell / Jack Steele
New Zealand Mixed Doubles Curling Championship; Naseby, Aug. 14–17	Courtney Smith / Anton Hood	Jessica Smith / Ben Smith	Ruby Kinney / Hunter Walker

=== Norway ===
Event		Gold	Silver	Bronze
Norwegian Junior Curling Championships; Stange, Dec. 12–14	M	Markus D. Dale	Sindre S. Lundberg	Tim Nicolai Aspeli
Norwegian Junior Curling Championships; Stange, Dec. 12–14	W	not held; absolute championship with 4 boys teams and 1 girls team (finished 5th), round robin, gold match (rr 1-2), bronze match (rr 3-4)		
Norwegian Men's Curling Championship; Lillehammer, Jan. 8–11		Magnus Ramsfjell	Andreas Hårstad	Grunde Buraas
Norwegian Women's Curling Championship; Lillehammer, Jan. 8–11		Marianne Rørvik	Torild Bjørnstad	Ingvild Skaga
Norwegian Mixed Doubles Curling Championship; Oslo, Jan. 29–31		Maia Ramsfjell / Bendik Ramsfjell	Martine Rønning / Grunde Buraas	Eilin Kjærland / Mathias Brænden

=== Russia ===
Event	Gold	Silver	Bronze
Russian Mixed Curling Cup; Novosibirsk, Sep. 4–7	Irkutsk Oblast - Komsomoll 1 (Elizaveta Trukhina)	Moscow 1 (Timofey Nasonov)	Novosibirsk Oblast 2 (Alexandra Stoyarosova)
Russian Mixed Doubles Curling Cup; Novosibirsk, Sep. 8–13	Irkutsk Oblast - Komsomoll 1 Elizaveta Trukhina / Nikolai Lysakov	Irkutsk Oblast - Komsomoll 4 Alina Fahurtdinova / Kirill Palagney	Moscow; Sophia Kuzmina / Stepan Kindyukov
Russian Wheelchair Mixed Doubles Curling Cup; Vladivostok, Sep. 22–29	Moscow Oblast 1 Rimma Mambetkarimova / Valery Ulyanov	Krasnoyarsk Krai; Natalia Gorbunova / Evgeny Gorbunov	Moscow 1 Irina Gamayunova / Konstantin Kurokhtin
Russian Men's Curling Cup; Sochi, Dec. 3–7	Saint Petersburg 2 (Oleg Krasikov)	Moscow Oblast 1 (Kirill Surovov)	Krasnodar Krai (Sergey Glukhov)
Russian Women's Curling Cup; Sochi, Dec. 10–14	Irkutsk Oblast - Komsomoll 1 (Elizaveta Trukhina)	Saint Petersburg 2 (Diana Margaryan)	Saint Petersburg 1 (Alina Kovaleva)
Russian Wheelchair Curling Cup; Sochi, Dec. 17-22	Moscow (Konstantin Kurokhtin)	Granite Chelyabinsk Oblast 2 (Alexey Fatuev)	Samara Oblast (Igor Ruzheynikov)
Russian Mixed Doubles Curling Championship; Sochi, Jan. 21–25	Novosibirsk Oblast 1 Alexandra Stoyarosova / Ivan Kazachkov	Saint Petersburg 2 Nkeirouka Ezekh / Oleg Krasikov	Moscow Oblast 3 Anastasia Moskaleva / Kirill Surovov
Russian Wheelchair Mixed Doubles Curling Championship; Sochi, Feb. 10-18			
Russian Women's Curling Championship; Sochi, Apr. 2–11			
Russian Men's Curling Championship; Sochi, Apr. 11–20			
Russian Wheelchair Curling Championship; Novosibirsk, Apr. 20–28			
Russian Mixed Curling Championship; Irkutsk, May 13–20			

Video: "Russian Curling TV" (in Russian). (Official RuTube-channel of Russian Curling Federation)

=== Scotland ===
Event		Gold	Silver	Bronze
Scottish Junior Curling Championships; Aberdeen, Nov. 18–22	M	Orrin Carson	Arran Thomson	Jack Halliday; Ethan Brewster
Scottish Junior Curling Championships; Aberdeen, Nov. 18–22	W	Katie Archibald	Amy Seftor	Callie Soutar; Tia Laurie
Scottish Senior Curling Championships; Forfar, Jan. 14–18	M	Tom Brewster	John Duff	Neil Joss; Ian Robertson
Scottish Senior Curling Championships; Forfar, Jan. 14–18	W	Jackie Lockhart	Margaret Agnew	Karen Kennedy
Scottish Men's Curling Championship; Dumfries, Feb. 24–28		Ross Whyte	Kyle Waddell	Glen Muirhead
Scottish Women's Curling Championship; Dumfries, Feb. 24–28		Fay Henderson	Callie Soutar	Tia Laurie
Scottish Mixed Doubles Curling Championship; Aberdeen, Mar. 5–8		McMillan / Bryce	Davie / Watt	Mitchell / Johnston; Watt / Waddell
Scottish Junior Mixed Doubles Curling Championship; Dumfries, Mar. 20–22		Laurie / Brewster	Burke / Hyslop	Kay / Brown; Seftor / Cormack

=== South Korea ===
Event	Gold	Silver	Bronze
Korean Men's Curling Championship; Uijeongbu, Jun. 19–27	Kim Soo-hyuk	Lee Jae-beom	Kim Hyo-jun
Korean Women's Curling Championship; Uijeongbu, Jun. 19–27	Gim Eun-ji	Ha Seung-youn	Kang Bo-bae
Korean Mixed Doubles Curling Championship; Jincheon, Jul. 21–29	S. Kim / Y. Jeong	H. Kim / Yoo	H. Lee / H. Kim

=== Sweden ===
Event		Gold	Silver	Bronze
Swedish Junior Curling Championships; Sundbyberg, Jan. 3–6	M	Vilmer Nygren	Conrad Schalley	Albin Sånnevall
Swedish Junior Curling Championships; Sundbyberg, Jan. 3–6	W	Moa Dryburgh	Molly Mabergs	Erika Ryberg
Swedish Senior Curling Championships; Östersund, Jan. 14–18	M	Fredrik Julius	Anders Westerberg	Joakim Mabergs
Swedish Senior Curling Championships; Östersund, Jan. 14–18	W	Anette Norberg	Helena Sundborg	Eva Heldin
Swedish Wheelchair Curling Championship; Gävle, Jan. 23–25		Kristina Ulander	Mats-Ola Engborg	Thomas Ögren
Swedish Junior Mixed Doubles Curling Championship; Östersund, Feb. 5–8		Moa Dryburgh / Vilmer Nygren	Emelie Sarén / Jonatan Meyerson	Molly Mabergs / Conrad Schalley
Swedish Mixed Curling Championship; Sveg, Feb. 19–22		Mjölby AI CF (Simon Granbom)	Härnösands CK (Per Noréen)	Svegs CK (Emil Markusson)
Swedish Mixed Doubles Curling Championship; Karlstad, Mar. 5–8		Therese Westman / Robin Ahlberg	Nilla Hallström / Johannes Patz	Rebecka Thunman / Simon Granbom
Swedish Wheelchair Mixed Doubles Curling Championship; Härnösand, Mar. 27–29		Karlstads CK (Pär Källström / Sabina Johansson coach: Stefan Eriksson)	Östersunds CK (Sandra Reppe / Eva Borg)	Härnösands CK (Kristina Ulander / Marcus Holm)
Swedish Men's Curling Championship; Umeå, Mar. 25–29		Sollefteå CK (Fredrik Nyman)	Mjölby AI CF (Axel Landelius)	Sundbybergs CK (Vilmer Nygren); Umeå CK (Johan Nygren)
Swedish Women's Curling Championship; Umeå, Mar. 25–29		Härnösands CK (Molly Mabergs)	Sundbybergs CK (Erika Ryberg)	Härnösands CK (Nilla Hallström)

=== Switzerland ===
Event		Gold	Silver	Bronze
Swiss Junior Mixed Doubles Curling Championship; St. Gallen, Dec. 20–22 2025		Dübendorf 1 Zoe Schwaller / Livio Ernst coaches: Marcel Wettstein, Gregor Obrist	Morges 1 Elodie Tschudi / Nathan Dryburgh coach: Thomas Tschalär	Thun-Basel; Jana-Tamara Hählen / Nevio Caccivio coach: Loris Caccivio
Swiss Wheelchair Mixed Doubles Curling Championship; Wetzikon, Jan. 16–18		Beatrix Blauel / Pierre-Alain Tercier	Isabelle Champion / Laurent Kneubühl	Françoise Jaquerod / Eric Décorvet
Swiss Senior Curling Championships; Thônex, Feb. 19–22	M	Christof Schwaller	Beat Brunner	Raphaël Brütsch
Swiss Senior Curling Championships; Thônex, Feb. 19–22	W	Nicole Strausak	Daniela Ruetschi-Schlegel	Esther Kobler
Swiss Men's Curling Championship; Bern, Feb. 23–28		Marco Hösli	Yannick Schwaller	Yves Stocker
Swiss Women's Curling Championship; Bern, Feb. 23–28		Xenia Schwaller	Silvana Tirinzoni	Corrie Hürlimann
Swiss Wheelchair Curling Championship; Bern, Feb. 25–28		Konstantin Schmaeh	Laurent Kneubühl	Jean-Yves Le Meur
Swiss Mixed Doubles Curling Championship; Thônex, Mar. 4–8		Stefanie Berset / Philipp Hösli	Michèle Jäggi / Romano Meier	Jenny Perret / Martin Rios
Swiss Junior Curling Championships; Thun, Mar. 13–15 and 19–22	M			
Swiss Junior Curling Championships; Thun, Mar. 13–15 and 19–22	W			
Swiss Mixed Curling Championship; Aarau, Mar. 13–15				

=== United States ===
Event		Gold	Silver	Bronze
United States U18 National Curling Championships; Lafayette, Jan. 8–11	M	Austin Kadlec	Miles Grabow	Caiden Rose
United States U18 National Curling Championships; Lafayette, Jan. 8–11	W	Allory Johnson	Nia Berg	Zoe Biesecker
United States Senior Curling Championships; Hartland, Jan. 11–18	M	Mike Farbelow	Bob Hedstrom	Bob LeClair
United States Senior Curling Championships; Hartland, Jan. 11–18	W	Margie Smith	Erika Brown	Kathy Jackson
United States Mixed Doubles Curling Championship; Bemidji, Jan. 20–25		(North Dakota) Kawleski / Kauffman	(Minnesota) Fleming / Bestland	(Minnesota) Fenson / Stopera (Colorado) Moores / Wheeler
United States Men's Curling Championship; Charlotte, Feb. 23 – Mar. 1		(Minnesota) John Shuster	(Minnesota) Andrew Stopera	(Minnesota) Kevin Tuma
United States Women's Curling Championship; Charlotte, Feb. 23 – Mar. 1		(Michigan) Delaney Strouse	(New Hampshire) Elizabeth Cousins	(Minnesota) Kim Rhyme
United States Junior Mixed Doubles Curling Championship; Falmouth, Mar. 12–15		(Minnesota) Wendling / Paral	(Minnesota) Hollands / Grabow	(Minnesota) Johnson / Hebert
United States Junior Curling Championships; Bismarck, Mar. 30 – Apr. 4	M	(Minnesota) Caden Hebert	(North Dakota) Connor Grabow	(Wisconsin) Carson McMullin
United States Junior Curling Championships; Bismarck, Mar. 30 – Apr. 4	W	(Massachusetts) Julia Pekowitz	(Minnesota) Nia Berg	(Minnesota) Megan Stopera
United States Mixed Curling Championship; Denver, Apr. 15–19				

== Tour events ==
=== Men's events ===
Week	Event	Winning skip	Runner-up skip	Purse	Winner's share	Tour	SFM
1	Morioka City Ice Mens Memorial Cup; Morioka, Japan, Jun. 7–8	(Japan) Kantaro Kawano	(Japan) Rio Hayashi	¥160,000	¥80,000	World Curling Japan	0.9000
1	Curling Stadium North Bay Summer Cash; North Bay, Ontario, Jul. 11–14	Cancelled					
2	Wakkanai Midori Challenge Cup; Wakkanai, Japan, Jul. 31 – Aug. 3	(Japan) Takumi Maeda	(Japan) Kohsuke Hirata	¥1,500,000	¥800,000	Hokkaido Curling	2.2000
3	Hokkaido Bank Curling Classic; Sapporo, Japan, Aug. 7–10	(Japan) Shinya Abe	(Japan) Kotaro Noguchi	¥1,700,000	¥1,000,000	Hokkaido Curling	2.3000
4	Baden Masters; Baden, Switzerland, Aug. 14–17	(Switzerland) Marco Hösli	(Switzerland) Yannick Schwaller	CHF 35,000	CHF 12,000	World Curling	7.0000
5	Euro Super Series; Stirling, Scotland, Aug. 21–24	(Scotland) Bruce Mouat	(China) Xu Xiaoming	£15,000	£4,500	—	5.5000
5	ADVICS Cup; Kitami, Japan, Aug. 21–24	(Japan) Tsuyoshi Yamaguchi	(Japan) Shinya Abe	¥1,700,000	¥1,000,000	Hokkaido Curling	2.4000
6	Trentino World Cup; Trentino, Italy, Aug. 28–31	(Switzerland) Yannick Schwaller	(United States) Daniel Casper	€27,000	€12,000	—	6.2000
6	Oslo Cup; Oslo, Norway, Aug. 28–31	(United States) Chris Plys	(Sweden) Niklas Edin	kr 112,000	kr 40,000	Nordic Curling	4.7000
6	Icebreaker Challenge; Morris, Manitoba, Aug. 28–31	(United States) Chase Sinnett	(United States) Caden Hebert	CA$6,500	CA$1,800	Manitoba Curling	2.2000
6	ARGO GRAPHICS Cup; Kitami, Japan, Aug. 28–31	(Japan) Takumi Maeda	(Japan) Tsuyoshi Yamaguchi	¥1,700,000	¥1,000,000	Hokkaido Curling	2.0000
7	Stu Sells Oakville Tankard; Oakville, Ontario, Sep. 5–8	(Scotland) Ross Whyte	(United States) Korey Dropkin	CA$30,000	CA$10,000	Stu Sells Ontario Curling	6.1000
7	Saville Shootout; Edmonton, Alberta, Sep. 5–7	(British Columbia) Cameron de Jong	(British Columbia) Matthew Blandford	CA$25,000	CA$6,000	Curling Stadium Alberta Curling	4.6000
7	Rice Lake Competitor Spiel; Rice Lake, Wisconsin, Sep. 5–7	(United States) Caden Hebert	(United States) Austin Kadlec	US$4,000	US$1,600	—	0.8000
8	AMJ Campbell Shorty Jenkins Classic; Cornwall, Ontario, Sep. 10–14	(Ontario) John Epping	(Switzerland) Yannick Schwaller	CA$60,000	CA$15,000	Ontario Curling	6.9000
8	ATB Okotoks Classic; Okotoks, Alberta, Sep. 11–14	(Alberta) Brad Jacobs	(United States) John Shuster	CA$50,000	CA$14,000	Alberta Curling	5.4000
8	WCT Belgium Men's Challenger; Zemst, Belgium, Sep. 11–14	(Switzerland) Andrin Schnider	(Sweden) Joel Westerberg	€3,000	€1,200	World Curling	1.0000
8	Tournoi Equinoxe Open; Montreal, Quebec, Sep. 12–14	(Quebec) Mike Kennedy	(Quebec) Sylvain Bellavance	CA$10,000	CA$2,000	Quebec Provincial Circuit	0.7000
9	Hogged Rock KW Fall Classic; Waterloo, Ontario, Sep. 18–21	(Italy) Joël Retornaz	(Ontario) Jayden King	CA$18,750	CA$4,750	Ontario Curling	5.2000
9	Mother Club Fall Curling Classic; Winnipeg, Manitoba, Sep. 17–21	(Manitoba) Braden Calvert	(Manitoba) Brett Walter	CA$7,000	CA$2,000	Manitoba Curling	1.9000
9	Prague Open; Prague, Czech Republic, Sep. 18–21	(Italy) Alberto Pimpini	(Switzerland) Felix Lüthold	€4,000	€1,500	World Curling	1.0000
10	AMJ Masters Tier 1 London, Ontario, Sep. 23–28	(Manitoba) Matt Dunstone	(Scotland) Ross Whyte	CA$175,000	CA$32,000	Grand Slam	10.0000
10	AMJ Masters Tier 2 London, Ontario, Sep. 23–28	(United States) Daniel Casper	(Alberta) Kevin Koe	CA$60,000	CA$10,000	Grand Slam	5.9000
10	MCT Challenge; Winnipeg, Manitoba, Sep. 26–28	(Manitoba) Braden Calvert	(Manitoba) Brett Walter	CA$9,000	CA$3,000	Manitoba Curling	2.7000
10	Tallinn Mens International Challenger; Tallinn, Estonia, Sep. 25–28	(Sweden) Fredrik Nyman	(Switzerland) Jan Iseli	€6,000	€1,200	World Curling	2.2000
10	Capital Curling Fall Men's; Ottawa, Ontario, Sep. 26–28	(South Korea) Kim Soo-hyuk	(South Korea) Lee Jae-beom	CA$10,400	CA$1,600	Ontario Curling; Capital Curling	1.5000
10	Invitation Valleyfield; Salaberry-de-Valleyfield, Quebec, Sep. 25–28	(Quebec) Jean-Michel Ménard	(Quebec) Pierre-Luc Morissette	CA$11,500	CA$3,000	Quebec Provincial Circuit	1.4000
10	Saville U25 Challenge; Edmonton, Alberta, Sep. 26–28	(Alberta) Zach Davies	(Alberta) Johnson Tao	CA$8,000	CA$2,400	Curling Stadium Alberta Curling	1.3000
11	Stu Sells Toronto Tankard; Toronto, Ontario, Oct. 1–6	(Ontario) Mark Kean	(Scotland) Kyle Waddell	CA$40,000	CA$10,000	Stu Sells Ontario Curling	6.0000
11	Match Town Trophy; Jönköping, Sweden, Oct. 2–5	(Scotland) Cameron Bryce	(Switzerland) Jan Iseli	kr 48,000	kr 24,000	Nordic Curling	2.3000
11	SaskTour Tier 2 Grand Slam Qualifier; Martensville, Saskatchewan, Oct. 3–5	(Saskatchewan) Kelly Knapp	(Saskatchewan) Dustin Kalthoff	CA$8,700	CA$1,895	Sask Curling	2.1000
11	Prestige Hotels & Resorts Curling Classic; Vernon, British Columbia, Oct. 3–5	(British Columbia) Jason Montgomery	(British Columbia) Cameron de Jong	CA$28,500	CA$5,000	Curling Stadium British Columbia Curling	2.0000
11	McKee Homes Fall Curling Classic; Airdrie, Alberta, Oct. 3–5	(Alberta) Darren Moulding	(Alberta) Tyler Powell	CA$15,000	CA$4,000	Alberta Curling	1.2000
11	SWISSCURLING Prometteurs Cup; Biel, Switzerland, Oct. 3–5	(Switzerland) Marco Ringgenberg	(Switzerland) Yves Stocker	CHF 6,000	CHF 3,000	—	1.1000
11	MCT Border Cup; Fargo, North Dakota, Oct. 2–5	(United States) Connor Grabow	(United States) Austin Kadlec	US$9,000	US$2,000	Manitoba Curling	0.6000
12	Saville Grand Prix; Edmonton, Alberta, Oct. 10–12	(Netherlands) Wouter Gösgens	(Alberta) Evan van Amsterdam	CA$25,000	CA$5,000	Curling Stadium Alberta Curling	3.9000
12	Dale's St. Paul Cashspiel; St. Paul, Minnesota, Oct. 9–12	(United States) Caden Hebert	(United States) Scott Dunnam	US$25,000	US$11,235	—	2.5000
12	Regina Highland Rocktoberfest; Regina, Saskatchewan, Oct. 10–13	(Saskatchewan) Kelly Knapp	(Saskatchewan) Randy Bryden	CA$6,780	CA$1,600	Sask Curling	2.0000
12	Steele Cup Cash; Fredericton, New Brunswick, Oct. 10–12	(New Brunswick) James Grattan	(New Brunswick) Colten Steele	CA$6,500	CA$2,000	—	1.0000
12	Capital Curling Classic; Ottawa, Ontario, Oct. 10–12	(Quebec) François Roberge	(Quebec) Leandre Girard	CA$15,000	CA$1,600	Ontario Curling; Capital Curling	0.7000
12	Minebea Mitsumi Cup; Miyota, Japan, Oct. 11–13	(Japan) Kotaro Noguchi	(Japan) Kaito Fujii	¥360,000	¥150,000	World Curling Japan	0.5000
13	Co-op Tour Challenge; Nisku, Alberta, Oct. 14–19	(Scotland) Bruce Mouat	(Manitoba) Matt Dunstone	CA$200,000	CA$38,000	Grand Slam	10.0000
13	U25 GSOC Tour Challenge; Beaumont, Alberta, Oct. 16–19	(Japan) Takumi Maeda	(Ontario) Jordan McNamara	CA$60,000	CA$5,000	Grand Slam	2.4000
13	King Cash Spiel; Maple Ridge, British Columbia, Oct. 16–19	(British Columbia) Matthew Blandford	(British Columbia) Jay Wakefield	CA$12,800	CA$4,000	British Columbia Curling	1.3000
13	Stroud Sleeman Cash Spiel; Stroud, Ontario, Oct. 17–20	(Ontario) Michael Fournier	(Ontario) Christopher Inglis	CA$6,250	CA$2,000	Ontario Curling	1.3000
13	MCT Curling Cup; Winnipeg, Manitoba, Oct. 17–19	(Manitoba) Sean Grassie	(Manitoba) Steve Irwin	CA$9,000	CA$1,975	Manitoba Curling	1.1000
14	Henderson Metal Fall Classic; Sault Ste. Marie, Ontario, Oct. 23–26	(United States) Rich Ruohonen	(Italy) Joël Retornaz	CA$100,000	CA$25,000	Curling Stadium Ontario Curling	6.0000
14	Grand Prix Bern Inter Curling Challenge; Bern, Switzerland, Oct. 24–26	(Netherlands) Wouter Gösgens	(Switzerland) Michael Brunner	CHF 18,100	CHF 5,000	World Curling	3.9000
14	S3 Group Curling Stadium Series; Swift Current, Saskatchewan, Oct. 24–26	(Saskatchewan) Kelly Knapp	(Saskatchewan) Steve Laycock	CA$12,000	CA$3,000	Curling Stadium Sask Curling	1.9000
14	Dave Jones Stanhope Simpson; Insurance Mayflower Cashspiel; Halifax, Nova Scotia, Oct. 23–26	(New Brunswick) Scott Jones	(Prince Edward Island) Tyler Smith	CA$14,000	CA$4,700	—	1.3000
14	Sundbyberg Open; Sundbyberg, Sweden, Oct. 23–26	(Sweden) Joel Westerberg	(Sweden) Vilmer Nygren	kr 40,000	kr 20,000	Nordic Curling	0.9000
14	Kamloops Crown of Curling; Kamloops, British Columbia, Oct. 24–26	(British Columbia) Richard Krell	(British Columbia) Mitch Young	CA$9,000	CA$4,000	British Columbia Curling	0.8000
15	Swiss Cup Basel; Arlesheim, Switzerland, Oct. 31 – Nov. 2	(Scotland) Cameron Bryce	(Switzerland) Yves Stocker	CHF 25,000	CHF 10,000	—	4.7000
15	Atkins Curling Supplies Classic; Winnipeg, Manitoba, Oct. 31 – Nov. 2	(Manitoba) Steve Irwin	(Manitoba) Tanner Lott	CA$9,000	CA$2,500	Manitoba Curling	2.3000
15	Challenge Nord-Ouest Air Creebec; Val-d'Or, Quebec, Oct. 31 – Nov. 2	(Quebec) Mathieu Gravel	(Quebec) Ghislain Doyon	CA$15,000	CA$3,100	Quebec Provincial Circuit	0.8000
16	KIOTI GSOC Tahoe; Stateline, Nevada, Nov. 4–9	(Scotland) Bruce Mouat	(Manitoba) Matt Dunstone	US$200,000	US$44,000	Grand Slam	10.0000
16	Nufloors Penticton Curling Classic; Penticton, British Columbia, Nov. 5–9	(Manitoba) B. J. Neufeld	(Alberta) Evan van Amsterdam	CA$100,000	CA$25,000	British Columbia Curling	5.0000
16	Original 16 Men's Cash Spiel; Calgary, Alberta, Nov. 7–9	(Alberta) Johnson Tao	(Yukon) Thomas Scoffin	CA$24,000	CA$8,000	Alberta Curling	2.7000
16	Broken Broom Tobacco Belt Cash Spiel; Tillsonburg, Ontario, Nov. 7–9	(Ontario) Mark Kean	(Ontario) Jayden King	CA$12,600	CA$4,000	Ontario Curling	2.3000
16	Original 16 Broomstacker; Wadena, Saskatchewan, Nov. 7–9	(Saskatchewan) Carl deConick-Smith	(Saskatchewan) Josh Bryden	CA$8,025	CA$1,925	Sask Curling	1.7000
16	Prague Classic; Prague, Czech Republic, Nov. 7–9	(Italy) Alberto Pimpini	(Turkey) Uğurcan Karagöz	€5,100	€1,800	World Curling	1.3000
17	Red Deer Curling Classic; Red Deer, Alberta, Nov. 14–17	(Alberta) Evan van Amsterdam	(Japan) Tsuyoshi Yamaguchi	CA$46,000	CA$10,000	Alberta Curling	5.0000
17	Stu Sells 1824 Halifax Classic; Halifax, Nova Scotia, Nov. 12–16	(New Brunswick) James Grattan	(Newfoundland and Labrador) Adam Boland	CA$25,500	CA$8,000	Stu Sells	2.0000
17	Nutana SaskTour Men's Spiel; Saskatoon, Saskatchewan, Nov. 14–16	(Saskatchewan) Carl deConick-Smith	(Saskatchewan) Bruce Korte	CA$6,780	CA$1,800	Sask Curling	1.7000
17	COMCO Cash Spiel; Stroud, Ontario, Nov. 14–16	(Ontario) Jordan McNamara	(Ontario) Weston Oryniak	CA$12,000	CA$3,000	Ontario Curling	1.0000
17	Finale du Circuit; Sorel-Tracy, Quebec, Nov. 14–16	(Quebec) Jean-Michel Ménard	(Quebec) Yannick Martel	CA$11,420	CA$2,250	Quebec Provincial Circuit	0.9000
17	Danish Open; Copenhagen, Denmark, Nov. 13–16	(Italy) Stefano Spiller	(Denmark) Jacob Schmidt	kr. 4,400	kr. 1,500	Nordic Curling	0.7000
18	Stu Sells Living Waters Collingwood Classic; Collingwood, Ontario, Nov. 20–23	(Ontario) Scott Howard	(Ontario) Jayden King	CA$25,000	CA$5,700	Stu Sells Ontario Curling	3.5000
18	Major Welding Abbotsford Cashspiel; Abbotsford, British Columbia, Nov. 21–23	(Japan) Tsuyoshi Yamaguchi	(British Columbia) Jason Montgomery	CA$18,000	CA$6,000	British Columbia Curling	2.0000
18	Crestwood Anniversary Showdown; Edmonton, Alberta, Nov. 20–23	(Netherlands) Wouter Gösgens	(Alberta) Jaxon Hiebert	CA$16,000	CA$4,000	Alberta Curling	1.9000
18	MCT Showdown; Stonewall, Manitoba, Nov. 21–23	(Manitoba) Tanner Lott	(Manitoba) Steve Irwin	CA$7,000	CA$2,000	Manitoba Curling	1.4000
18	Jim Sullivan Curling Classic; Fredericton, New Brunswick, Nov. 21–23	(New Brunswick) Jamie Stewart	(Nova Scotia) Kendal Thompson	CA$8,500	CA$3,000	—	1.1000
18	Mile Zero Cash Spiel; Dawson Creek, British Columbia, Nov. 21–23	Cancelled					
19	DEKALB Superspiel; Morris, Manitoba, Nov. 27–30	(Manitoba) Braden Calvert	(United States) Chase Sinnett	CA$30,000	CA$10,000	Manitoba Curling	3.3000
19	Stu Sells Brantford NISSAN Classic; Brantford, Ontario, Nov. 28 – Dec. 1	(Ontario) Sam Mooibroek	(Ontario) Mark Kean	CA$15,000	CA$5,000	Stu Sells Ontario Curling	3.3000
19	Charlevoix Curling de Curling Desjardins; Charlevoix, Quebec, Nov. 27–30	(Quebec) Jean-Michel Ménard	(Newfoundland and Labrador) Ty Dilello	CA$28,000	CA$5,000	Quebec Provincial Circuit	1.6000
19	Moose Jaw SaskTour Spiel; Moose Jaw, Saskatchewan, Nov. 28–30	(Saskatchewan) Kelly Knapp	(Saskatchewan) Jason Ackerman	CA$10,000	CA$2,000	Sask Curling	1.4000
19	Island Petroleum Cashspiel; Summerside, Prince Edward Island, Nov. 28–30	(Nova Scotia) Graeme Weagle	(Newfoundland and Labrador) Simon Perry	CA$3,200	CA$1,300	—	0.5000
20	WCT Take-Out Trophy; Basel, Switzerland, Dec. 5–7	(Scotland) Orrin Carson	(Switzerland) Yves Stocker	CHF 17,000	CHF 6,000	World Curling	3.6000
20	Vic Open; Quebec City, Quebec, Dec. 5–7	(Quebec) Jean-Michel Ménard	(Quebec) Julien Tremblay	CA$5,200	CA$2,000	Quebec Provincial Circuit	1.0000
21	RBC Dominion Securities Western Showdown; Swift Current, Saskatchewan, Dec. 11–14	(Scotland) Bruce Mouat	(Saskatchewan) Rylan Kleiter	CA$40,000	CA$12,000	Curling Stadium Sask Curling	7.0000
21	Rick Rowsell Classic; St. John's, Newfoundland and Labrador, Dec. 11–14	(New Brunswick) Scott Jones	(Prince Edward Island) Tyler Smith	CA$15,000	CA$4,000	—	1.2000
21	Chicoutimi Invitational; Chicoutimi, Quebec, Dec. 11–14	(Quebec) Julien Tremblay	(Quebec) Yannick Martel	CA$5,500	CA$2,000	Quebec Provincial Circuit	0.8000
22	HearingLife Canadian Open Tier 1 Saskatoon, Saskatchewan, Dec. 16–21	(Switzerland) Yannick Schwaller	(Scotland) Ross Whyte	CA$200,000	CA$40,000	Grand Slam	10.0000
22	HearingLife Canadian Open Tier 2 Saskatoon, Saskatchewan, Dec. 16–21	(Norway) Magnus Ramsfjell	(Switzerland) Michael Brunner	CA$60,000	CA$13,750	Grand Slam	5.4000
22	Lakeside Levelling Charity Open; Thunder Bay, Ontario, Dec. 19–21	(Ontario) Bryan Burgess	(Ontario) Dylan Johnston	CA$12,000	CA$2,600	Ontario Curling	0.7000
25	Crown Royal Players' Championship; Steinbach, Manitoba, Jan. 6–11	(Scotland) Ross Whyte	(Scotland) Kyle Waddell	CA$175,000		Grand Slam	10.0000
26	Mercure Perth Masters; Perth, Scotland, Jan. 15–18	(Scotland) Ross Whyte	(Italy) Stefano Spiller	£38,250	£8,000	—	4.5000
26	Ed Werenich Golden Wrench Classic; Tempe, Arizona, Jan. 15–18	(Manitoba) Jordon McDonald	(Saskatchewan) Rylan Kleiter	US$24,000	US$10,000	—	3.4000
26	St. Galler Elite Challenge; St. Gallen, Switzerland, Jan. 16–19	(Switzerland) Michael Brunner	(Switzerland) Manuel Jermann	CHF 6,000		World Curling	2.2000
27	Sun City Cup; Karlstad, Sweden, Jan. 22–25	(Italy) Stefano Spiller	(Japan) Takumi Maeda	kr 55,000	kr 20,000	Nordic Curling	3.7000
27	Duluth Cash Spiel; Duluth, Minnesota, Jan. 23–25	(Japan) Shinya Abe	(United States) Wesley Wendling	US$15,000	US$5,000	Ontario Curling	1.6000
30	Martensville International; Martensville, Saskatchewan, Feb. 13–16	(Manitoba) Jordon McDonald	(Saskatchewan) Mike McEwen	CA$12,500	CA$5,000	Curling Stadium Sask Curling	3.4000
34	Karuizawa International; Karuizawa, Japan, Mar. 12–15	(Japan) Shinya Abe	(Norway) Magnus Ramsfjell	¥1,500,000	¥700,000	—	2.7000
35	Speedy Creek Shootout; Swift Current, Saskatchewan, Mar. 19–22	Cancelled					
38	British Open; Dumfries, Scotland, Apr. 10–12	Cancelled					

=== Women's events ===
Week	Event	Winning skip	Runner-up skip	Purse	Winner's share	Tour	SFM
1	Morioka City Ice Women's Memorial Cup; Morioka, Japan, Jun. 5–6	Cancelled					
1	Curling Stadium North Bay Summer Cash; North Bay, Ontario, Jul. 11–14	Cancelled					
2	Wakkanai Midori Challenge Cup; Wakkanai, Japan, Jul. 31 – Aug. 3	(Japan) Satsuki Fujisawa	(Japan) Miyu Ueno	¥1,500,000	¥800,000	Hokkaido Curling	4.7000
3	Hokkaido Bank Curling Classic; Sapporo, Japan, Aug. 7–10	(Japan) Sayaka Yoshimura	(Japan) Miku Nihira	¥1,700,000	¥1,000,000	Hokkaido Curling	5.0000
5	Euro Super Series; Stirling, Scotland, Aug. 21–24	(United States) Tabitha Peterson	(Scotland) Sophie Jackson	£10,000	£3,000	—	3.8000
5	ADVICS Cup; Kitami, Japan, Aug. 21–24	(Japan) Satsuki Fujisawa	(Japan) Miku Nihira	¥1,700,000	¥1,000,000	Hokkaido Curling	3.5000
6	Oslo Cup; Oslo, Norway, Aug. 28–31	(Switzerland) Xenia Schwaller	(Norway) Torild Bjørnstad	kr 78,000	kr 40,000	Nordic Curling	4.2000
6	Curling1spoon Elite 8 Uiseong, South Korea, Aug. 28–31	(South Korea) Kang Bo-bae	(China) Wang Rui	₩1,000,000	₩500,000	—	3.5000
6	Icebreaker Challenge; Morris, Manitoba, Aug. 28–31	(British Columbia) Kayla MacMillan	(Manitoba) Kate Cameron	CA$6,500	CA$1,800	Manitoba Curling	3.5000
7	Saville Shootout; Edmonton, Alberta, Sep. 5–7	(Manitoba) Kerri Einarson	(South Korea) Gim Eun-ji	CA$25,000	CA$6,000	Curling Stadium Alberta Curling	6.1000
7	Stu Sells Oakville Tankard; Oakville, Ontario, Sep. 5–8	(South Korea) Ha Seung-youn	(Japan) Miku Nihira	CA$30,000	CA$7,500	Stu Sells Ontario Curling	5.9000
7	Rice Lake Competitor Spiel; Rice Lake, Wisconsin, Sep. 5–7	(United States) Nia Berg	(United States) Bella Hagenbunch	US$2,000	US$1,200	—	1.0000
8	Saville Grand Prix; Edmonton, Alberta, Sep. 12–14	(Manitoba) Selena Njegovan	(South Korea) Park You-been	CA$25,000	CA$6,000	Curling Stadium Alberta Curling	6.3000
8	AMJ Campbell Shorty Jenkins Classic; Cornwall, Ontario, Sep. 10–14	(Switzerland) Xenia Schwaller	(Denmark) Madeleine Dupont	CA$45,000	CA$12,000	Ontario Curling	5.9000
8	Women's Masters Basel; Arlesheim, Switzerland, Sep. 12–14	(Switzerland) Silvana Tirinzoni	(Italy) Stefania Constantini	CHF 35,000	CHF 11,000	—	4.4000
9	Hogged Rock KW Fall Classic; Waterloo, Ontario, Sep. 18–21	(Ontario) Hollie Duncan	(Japan) Miku Nihira	CA$15,000	CA$3,300	Ontario Curling	5.2000
9	Mother Club Fall Curling Classic; Winnipeg, Manitoba, Sep. 17–21	(Saskatchewan) Nancy Martin	(United States) Kim Rhyme	CA$11,000	CA$2,500	Manitoba Curling	3.3000
10	AMJ Masters Tier 1 London, Ontario, Sep. 23–28	(Ontario) Rachel Homan	(Switzerland) Silvana Tirinzoni	CA$175,000	CA$36,000	Grand Slam	10.0000
10	AMJ Masters Tier 2 London, Ontario, Sep. 23–28	(Japan) Ikue Kitazawa	(Scotland) Sophie Jackson	CA$60,000	CA$10,000	Grand Slam	5.7000
10	Saville U25 Challenge; Edmonton, Alberta, Sep. 26–28	(Alberta) Serena Gray-Withers	(Alberta) Emma Deschiffart	CA$8,000	CA$2,400	Curling Stadium Alberta Curling	2.4000
10	MCT Challenge; Winnipeg, Manitoba, Sep. 26–28	(Manitoba) Kristy Watling	(Manitoba) Lisa McLeod	CA$6,750	CA$2,500	Manitoba Curling	2.0000
10	Prague Ladies International; Prague, Czech Republic, Sep. 26–28	(Turkey) Dilşat Yıldız	(Switzerland) Zoe Schwaller	€4,000	€1,500	World Curling	1.7000
11	Stu Sells Toronto Tankard; Toronto, Ontario, Oct. 1–6	(South Korea) Ha Seung-youn	(Switzerland) Silvana Tirinzoni	CA$40,000	CA$10,000	Stu Sells Ontario Curling	7.0000
11	McKee Homes Fall Curling Classic; Airdrie, Alberta, Oct. 3–5	(Alberta) Serena Gray-Withers	(South Korea) Park You-been	CA$15,000	CA$4,000	Alberta Curling	2.6000
11	Match Town Trophy; Jönköping, Sweden, Oct. 2–5	(Norway) Torild Bjørnstad	(Latvia) Evelīna Barone	kr 48,000	kr 24,000	Nordic Curling	2.2000
11	Prestige Hotels & Resorts Curling Classic; Vernon, British Columbia, Oct. 2–5	(British Columbia) Mahra Harris	(British Columbia) Sarah Wark	CA$10,000	CA$4,000	Curling Stadium British Columbia Curling	0.9000
12	Autumn Gold Curling Classic; Okotoks, Alberta, Oct. 10–13	(South Korea) Gim Eun-ji	(British Columbia) Taylor Reese-Hansen	CA$45,000	CA$12,250	Alberta Curling	7.0000
12	Dale's St. Paul Cashspiel; St. Paul, Minnesota, Oct. 9–12	(South Korea) Kim Eun-jung	(United States) Delaney Strouse	US$25,000	US$5,000	World Curling Tour	2.9000
12	Regina Highland Rocksgiving; Regina, Saskatchewan, Oct. 10–13	(Saskatchewan) Ashley Thevenot	(Saskatchewan) Penny Barker	CA$8,000	CA$1,600	Sask Curling	2.5000
12	Steele Cup Cash; Fredericton, New Brunswick, Oct. 10–12	(New Brunswick) Sylvie Quillian	(New Brunswick) Andrea Kelly	CA$4,500	CA$2,000	—	1.4000
13	Co-op Tour Challenge; Nisku, Alberta, Oct. 14–19	(Ontario) Rachel Homan	(Switzerland) Silvana Tirinzoni	CA$200,000	CA$38,000	Grand Slam	10.0000
13	U25 GSOC Tour Challenge; Beaumont, Alberta, Oct. 16–19	(Alberta) Serena Gray-Withers	(Japan) Yuina Miura	CA$16,000	CA$5,000	Grand Slam	2.7000
13	MCT Curling Cup; Winnipeg, Manitoba, Oct. 17–19	(Manitoba) Lisa McLeod	(Manitoba) Kate Cameron	CA$5,825	CA$1,975	Manitoba Curling	2.5000
13	King Cash Spiel; Maple Ridge, British Columbia, Oct. 16–19	(Japan) Ikue Kitazawa	(British Columbia) Kayla Wilson	CA$9,600	CA$3,600	British Columbia Curling	1.3000
13	Stroud Sleeman Cash Spiel; Stroud, Ontario, Oct. 17–20	(Ontario) Chelsea Principi	(Ontario) Lauren Mann	CA$6,250	CA$2,000	Ontario Curling	1.3000
14	Sundbyberg Open; Sundbyberg, Sweden, Oct. 23–26	(Denmark) Madeleine Dupont	(Turkey) Dilşat Yıldız	kr 40,000	kr 20,000	Nordic Curling	2.9000
14	Lloydminster SaskTour Spiel; Lloydminster, Saskatchewan, Oct. 24–26	(British Columbia) Taylor Reese-Hansen	(Saskatchewan) Penny Barker	CA$8,000	CA$2,000	Sask Curling	2.2000
14	Kamloops Crown of Curling; Kamloops, British Columbia, Oct. 24–26	(Japan) Miyu Ueno	(British Columbia) Kelsey Powell	CA$9,000	CA$4,000	British Columbia Curling	2.0000
14	Dave Jones Stanhope Simpson; Insurance Mayflower Cashspiel; Halifax, Nova Scotia, Oct. 23–26	(New Brunswick) Andrea Kelly	(New Brunswick) Melissa Adams	CA$8,800	CA$2,500	—	1.3000
15	Independent North Grenville Fall Classic; Kemptville, Ontario, Oct. 30 – Nov. 2	(Japan) Ikue Kitazawa	(Ontario) Hollie Duncan	CA$25,000	CA$7,500	Ontario Curling	3.8000
15	Atkins Curling Supplies Classic; Winnipeg, Manitoba, Oct. 31 – Nov. 2	(United States) Kim Rhyme	(Manitoba) Hailey McFarlane	CA$9,000	CA$2,500	Manitoba Curling	1.9000
16	KIOTI GSOC Tahoe; Stateline, Nevada, Nov. 4–9	(Ontario) Rachel Homan	(Switzerland) Silvana Tirinzoni	US$200,000	US$44,000	Grand Slam	10.0000
16	SaskTour Tier 2 Grand Slam Qualifier; Martensville, Saskatchewan, Nov. 7–9	(British Columbia) Corryn Brown	(Saskatchewan) Sara Miller	CA$8,000	CA$2,000	Curling Stadium Sask Curling	3.2000
16	Clarion Cup; Rimbey, Alberta, Nov. 7–10	(Alberta) Kayla Skrlik	(British Columbia) Taylor Reese-Hansen	CA$20,000	CA$6,000	Alberta Curling	2.8000
16	Tallinn Ladies International Challenger; Tallinn, Estonia, Nov. 6–9	(Denmark) Madeleine Dupont	(Scotland) Fay Henderson	€6,000	€1,200	—	2.7000
16	Swiss Chalet Women's Curling Stadium Spiel; North Bay, Ontario, Nov. 7–9	(Ontario) Chelsea Principi	(Switzerland) Zoe Schwaller	CA$10,000	CA$3,000	Curling Stadium Ontario Curling	2.6000
17	Red Deer Curling Classic; Red Deer, Alberta, Nov. 14–17	(Switzerland) Silvana Tirinzoni	(Japan) Miku Nihira	CA$39,000	CA$10,000	Alberta Curling	6.1000
17	Stu Sells 1824 Halifax Classic; Halifax, Nova Scotia, Nov. 12–16	(Nova Scotia) Christina Black	(Ontario) Danielle Inglis	CA$25,500	CA$8,000	Stu Sells	3.0000
17	Nutana SaskTour Women's Spiel; Saskatoon, Saskatchewan, Nov. 14–16	(Saskatchewan) Sara Miller	(Saskatchewan) Penny Barker	CA$8,000	CA$1,800	Sask Curling	2.6000
17	Danish Open; Copenhagen, Denmark, Nov. 13–16	(Norway) Marianne Rørvik	(Latvia) Evelīna Barone	kr. 4,400	kr. 1,000	Nordic Curling	2.4000
18	Stu Sells Living Waters Collingwood Classic; Collingwood, Ontario, Nov. 20–23	(Ontario) Krista Scharf	(Ontario) Krysta Burns	CA$7,750	CA$3,000	Stu Sells Ontario Curling	3.1000
18	Crestwood Anniversary Showdown; Edmonton, Alberta, Nov. 20–23	(Japan) Miyu Ueno	(British Columbia) Taylor Reese-Hansen	CA$16,000	CA$4,000	Alberta Curling	2.8000
18	MCT Showdown; Stonewall, Manitoba, Nov. 21–23	(Manitoba) Lisa McLeod	(Manitoba) Beth Peterson	CA$5,500	CA$2,000	Manitoba Curling	2.2000
18	Jim Sullivan Curling Classic; Fredericton, New Brunswick, Nov. 21–23	(New Brunswick) Melissa Adams	(New Brunswick) Andrea Kelly	CA$10,000	CA$3,000	—	1.3000
18	Major Welding Abbotsford Cashspiel; Abbotsford, British Columbia, Nov. 21–23	(British Columbia) Kelsey Powell	(British Columbia) Shiella Cowan	CA$13,000	CA$5,500	British Columbia Curling	1.1000
19	DEKALB Superspiel; Morris, Manitoba, Nov. 27–30	(Japan) Miyu Ueno	(Alberta) Serena Gray-Withers	CA$17,200	CA$6,000	Manitoba Curling	4.1000
19	Stu Sells Brantford NISSAN Classic; Brantford, Ontario, Nov. 28 – Dec. 1	(Quebec) Laurie St-Georges	(United States) Elizabeth Cousins	CA$15,000	CA$5,000	Stu Sells Ontario Curling	2.9000
19	Moose Jaw SaskTour Spiel; Moose Jaw, Saskatchewan, Nov. 28–30	(Saskatchewan) Penny Barker	(Saskatchewan) Jolene Campbell	CA$9,600	CA$1,600	Sask Curling	2.3000
19	Charlevoix Curling de Curling Desjardins; Charlevoix, Quebec, Nov. 27–30	(Quebec) Gabrielle Lavoie	(Quebec) Valerie Tanguay	CA$9,000	CA$3,000	Quebec Provincial Circuit	0.3000
20	WCT Take-Out Trophy; Basel, Switzerland, Dec. 5–7	(Switzerland) Xenia Schwaller	(Switzerland) Nadine Bärtschiger	CHF 17,000	CHF 6,000	World Curling	2.5000
21	RBC Dominion Securities Western Showdown; Swift Current, Saskatchewan, Dec. 11–14	(Switzerland) Silvana Tirinzoni	(South Korea) Ha Seung-youn	CA$40,000	CA$12,000	Curling Stadium Sask Curling	7.0000
21	Rick Rowsell Classic; St. John's, Newfoundland and Labrador, Dec. 11–14	(Newfoundland and Labrador) Mackenzie Mitchell	(Newfoundland and Labrador) Sarah Boland	CA$5,500	CA$2,000	—	0.5000
22	HearingLife Canadian Open Tier 1 Saskatoon, Saskatchewan, Dec. 16–21	(Switzerland) Silvana Tirinzoni	(Japan) Satsuki Fujisawa	CA$200,000	CA$36,000	Grand Slam	10.0000
22	HearingLife Canadian Open Tier 2 Saskatoon, Saskatchewan, Dec. 16–21	(British Columbia) Taylor Reese-Hansen	(Manitoba) Selena Njegovan	CA$60,000	CA$13,750	Grand Slam	5.5000
24	New Year Curling in Miyota; Miyota, Japan, Dec. 29 – Jan. 1	(Japan) Misaki Tanaka	(Japan) Aoi Watanabe	¥2,000,000	¥1,000,000	World Curling Japan	1.5000
25	Crown Royal Players' Championship; Steinbach, Manitoba, Jan. 6–11	(Switzerland) Silvana Tirinzoni	(Manitoba) Kerri Einarson	CA$175,000	CA$40,000	Grand Slam	10.0000
26	Mercure Perth Masters; Perth, Scotland, Jan. 15–18	(Denmark) Madeleine Dupont	(Norway) Torild Bjørnstad	£15,900	£3,500	—	3.4000
26	St. Galler Elite Challenge; St. Gallen, Switzerland, Jan. 16–19	(Switzerland) Elodie Jerger	(Switzerland) Sophie Heinimann	CHF 6,000		World Curling	1.0000
27	Sun City Cup; Karlstad, Sweden, Jan. 22–25	(Denmark) Madeleine Dupont	(Japan) Satsuki Fujisawa	kr 55,000	kr 20,000	Nordic Curling	5.1000
28	International Bernese Ladies Cup; Bern, Switzerland, Jan. 29 – Feb. 1	(Switzerland) Silvana Tirinzoni	(Sweden) Almida de Val	CHF 20,000	CHF 6,000	World Curling	4.7000
32	Martensville International; Martensville, Saskatchewan, Feb. 27 – Mar. 2	Cancelled					
34	Karuizawa International; Karuizawa, Japan, Mar. 12–15	(Sweden) Anna Hasselborg	(Japan) Ikue Kitazawa	¥1,500,000	¥700,000	—	3.8000

=== Mixed doubles events ===
Week	Event	Winning Team	Runner-up Team	Purse	Winner's share	Tour	SFM
1	Obihiro Spring Cup; Obihiro, Japan, Jun. 26–29	(Japan) Ueno / Yamaguchi	(Japan) Tanaka / Sato	¥500,000	¥300,000	Hokkaido Curling	0.8000
6	Stirling Mixed Doubles Invitational; Stirling, Scotland, Aug. 25–27	(Scotland) Dodds / Mouat	(Australia) Gill / Hewitt	£5,000	£1,500	—	5.5000
8	GOLDLINE Mixed Doubles Jacques Cartier; Quebec City, Quebec, Sep. 12–14	(New Brunswick) Adams / Robichaud	(Quebec) Maheux / Maheux	CA$4,000	CA$1,500	Circuit Goldline	2.0000
8	Mixed Doubles Prague Open; Prague, Czech Republic, Sep. 11–14	(Czech Republic) Zelingrová / Chabičovský	(China) Zhang / Wang	€3,500	€1,100	World Curling	1.8000
9	WCT Tallinn Mixed Doubles International; Tallinn, Estonia, Sep. 18–21	(China) Ye / Yu	(Norway) Skaslien / Nedregotten	€6,000	€1,400	World Curling	4.6000
9	Victoria Mixed Doubles Cash Spiel; Victoria, British Columbia, Sep. 19–21	(United States) Thiesse / Dropkin	(British Columbia) Woo / Wenzek	CA$8,000	CA$2,100	British Columbia Curling	1.7000
10	Dixie Mixed Doubles Cup; Mississauga, Ontario, Sep. 27–28	(South Korea) Kim / Jeong	(Ontario) Ford / Krowchuk	CA$6,250		Ontario Mixed Doubles Curling	2.6000
10	Colorado Curling Cup; Lafayette, Colorado, Sep. 25–28	(Saskatchewan) Martin / Laycock	(Australia) Gill / Hewitt	US$16,000	US$5,000	World Curling	2.2000
10	John Ross & Sons Mixed Doubles Spiel; Halifax, Nova Scotia, Sep. 26–28	(New Brunswick) Adams / Robichaud	(Nova Scotia) Stevens / Weagle	CA$4,800	CA$1,200	—	1.3000
11	Kemptville Mixed Doubles; Kemptville, Ontario, Oct. 3–5	(Ontario) Weeks / Steep	(Ontario) Neil / McDonald	CA$6,000		Ontario Mixed Doubles Curling	2.2000
11	GOLDLINE Mixed Doubles Chicoutimi; Chicoutimi, Quebec, Oct. 3–5	(Quebec) Bouchard / Charette	(Quebec) Gionest / Desjardins	CA$4,000		Circuit Goldline	2.0000
12	Mixed Doubles Karlstad; Karlstad, Sweden, Oct. 9–12	(Japan) Koana / Aoki	(Sweden) Westman / Ahlberg	kr 44,000		—	4.0000
12	Mixed Doubles Super Series: Kitchener-Waterloo; Waterloo, Ontario, Oct. 9–12	(United States) Anderson / Stopera	(United States) Thiesse / Dropkin	CA$13,000	CA$6,000	Super Series	3.9000
12	Cloverdale Thanksgiving Mixed Doubles; Curling Classic; Surrey, British Columbia, Oct. 10–13	(British Columbia) Woo / Wenzek	(British Columbia) Loken / Tanaka	CA$9,600		British Columbia Curling	1.4000
12	WCT Austrian Mixed Doubles Cup; Kitzbühel, Austria, Oct. 9–12	(Ukraine) Kononenko / Schur	(Italy) Scalesse / Pimpini	€3,200	€1,200	World Curling	0.5000
13	Mixed Doubles Bern; Bern, Switzerland, Oct. 17–19	(Australia) Gill / Hewitt	(Germany) Schöll / Sutor	CHF 12,000	CHF 3,000	—	5.6000
13	Keith Martin Memorial Mixed Doubles; Arthur, Ontario, Oct. 17–19	(Ontario) Smith / McDonald	(Ontario) Spruit / Spruit	CA$7,400		Ontario Mixed Doubles Curling	2.3000
13	GOLDLINE Mixed Doubles Mont-Bruno; Saint-Bruno-de-Montarville, Quebec, Oct. 17–19	(Quebec) Sanscartier / Caron	(Quebec) Gionest / Desjardins	CA$4,000		Circuit Goldline	2.2000
13	Fredericton Doubles Cashspiel; Fredericton, New Brunswick, Oct. 17–19	(New Brunswick) Adams / Robichaud	(New Brunswick) Tracy / Riggs	CA$4,000	CA$1,600	—	1.2000
13	Martensville Mixed Doubles; Martensville, Saskatchewan, Oct. 17–19	(Saskatchewan) Springer / Springer	(Alberta) Hartwell / Borkovic	CA$6,500		Curling Stadium Sask Curling	1.1000
14	Mixed Doubles Gstaad; Gstaad, Switzerland, Oct. 21–23	(Australia) Gill / Hewitt	(Norway) Skaslien / Nedregotten	CHF 9,000		—	5.1000
14	Sudbury Mixed Doubles Open; Sudbury, Ontario, Oct. 24–26	(Ontario) Craig / Craig	(Ontario) Jones / Laing	CA$8,000	CA$2,400	Ontario Mixed Doubles Curling	2.3000
15	Geneva Mixed Doubles Invitational; Geneva, Switzerland, Oct. 28–30	(Scotland) Dodds / Mouat	(Australia) Gill / Hewitt	CHF 12,000	CHF 5,000	—	6.0000
15	Saville Series Mixed Doubles; Edmonton, Alberta, Oct. 31 – Nov. 2	(United States) Thiesse / Dropkin	(Alberta) (Ontario) Gray-Withers / Pietrangelo	CA$11,000	CA$2,750	Curling Stadium Alberta Curling	3.9000
15	Palmerston Mixed Doubles Spiel; Palmerston, Ontario, Nov. 1–3	(Ontario) Neil / McDonald	(Ontario) Wilson / Dow	CA$7,000		Ontario Mixed Doubles Curling	2.3000
15	WCT Latvian Mixed Doubles Curling Cup 1 Riga, Latvia, Oct. 31 – Nov. 2	(Latvia) Gaidule / Buncis	(Norway) Hausstätter / Lundberg	€1,000		World Curling	1.1000
15	Moose Jaw Spooktacular Mixed Doubles; Moose Jaw, Saskatchewan, Oct. 31 – Nov. 2	(Saskatchewan) LaMontagne / LaMontagne	(Saskatchewan) Wood / Snow	CA$8,000		Curling Stadium Sask Curling	0.9000
16	WCT Mixed Doubles Łódź; Łódź, Poland, Nov. 6–9	(Sweden) Westman / Ahlberg	(Norway) Kjærland / Brænden	€4,500		World Curling	3.1000
16	GOLDLINE Omnium Services; Financiers Richard April; Rivière-du-Loup, Quebec, Nov. 7–9	(New Brunswick) Johnston / Johnston	(New Brunswick) Watson / Beland	CA$4,000		Circuit Goldline	1.8000
17	Mixed Doubles Super Series: Lindsay; Lindsay, Ontario, Nov. 13–16	(Norway) Skaslien / Nedregotten	(South Korea) Kim / Jeong	CA$18,000	CA$6,000	Super Series	5.6000
17	Ilderton Mixed Doubles Spiel; Ilderton, Ontario, Nov. 15–16	(Ontario) Jones / Laing	(Ontario) Cave / King	CA$4,000		Ontario Mixed Doubles Curling	2.0000
17	HARDLINE Sherbrooke Mixed Doubles; Sherbrooke, Quebec, Nov. 14–16	(Quebec) Cheal / Cheal	(Ontario) Mallett / Jackson	CA$6,500		—	0.9000
17	Parksville Double Doubles Spiel; Parksville, British Columbia, Nov. 13–16	(British Columbia) Jensen / Meister	(British Columbia) Woo / Wenzek	CA$7,900	CA$2,050	British Columbia Curling	0.6000
18	Aly Jenkins Mixed Doubles Memorial; Martensville, Saskatchewan, Nov. 21–23	(Switzerland) Perret / Rios	(Australia) Gill / Hewitt	CA$20,000	CA$1,950	Curling Stadium Sask Curling	4.6000
18	St. Thomas Mixed Doubles Classic; St. Thomas, Ontario, Nov. 21–23	(Ontario) Neil / McDonald	(Ontario) Ford / Campbell	CA$7,000	CA$1,800	Ontario Mixed Doubles Curling	2.8000
20	Madtown Doubledown; McFarland, Wisconsin, Dec. 4–7	(Ontario) Ford / Campbell	(Sweden) Westman / Ahlberg	US$27,000		World Curling	5.0000
20	Montana's North Bay Mixed Doubles; North Bay, Ontario, Dec. 5–7	(Ontario) Brunton / Forget	(Ontario) Weeks / Steep	CA$5,000	CA$1,200	Ontario Mixed Doubles Curling	3.2000
20	Uppsala Mixed Doubles; Uppsala, Sweden, Dec. 4–7	(Scotland) McMillan / Bryce	(Scotland) Davie / Watt	kr 56,000		—	2.9000
20	Challenge Double Mixte Boucherville; Boucherville, Quebec, Dec. 5–7	(Quebec) Sanscartier / Caron	(Quebec) Fellmann / Lanoue	CA$6,800		World Curling	1.4000
21	Mixed Doubles Super Series: Moose Jaw; Moose Jaw, Saskatchewan, Dec. 11–14	(Alberta) Peterman / Gallant	(Manitoba) Lott / Lott	CA$8,000	CA$4,000	Super Series	3.8000
21	St. Marys Mixed Doubles; St. Marys, Ontario, Dec. 12–14	(Ontario) Weeks / Steep	(Ontario) Cave / King	CA$6,000		Ontario Mixed Doubles	2.6000
21	Cincinnati Mixed Doubles Cup; West Chester, Ohio, Dec. 12–14	(Ontario) Neil / McDonald	(United States) Scebbi / Scebbi	US$5,000	US$1,500		0.9000
23	Gothenburg Mixed Doubles Cup; Gothenburg, Sweden, Dec. 28–30	(United States) Thiesse / Dropkin	(Scotland) Dodds / Mouat	kr 75,000	kr 35,000	World Curling	4.9000
23	Southern States Mixed Doubles; Charlotte, North Carolina, Dec. 28–31	(Saskatchewan) Martin / (United States) Hozjan	(Ontario) Nathan / Nathan	US$10,500	US$2,800		1.1000
24	Overwatch Specialty Service Open; Fredericton, New Brunswick, Jan. 1–4	(New Brunswick) Watson / Beland	(Ontario) Craig / Craig	CA$20,000		Super Series	2.9000
25	Ontario Mixed Doubles Tour Championship; Cambridge, Ontario, Jan. 9–11	(Ontario) Smith / McDonald	(Ontario) Ford / Campbell	CA$6,300		Ontario Mixed Doubles Curling	3.8000
26	Tallinn Masters Mixed Doubles; Tallinn, Estonia, Jan. 15–18	(Norway) Skaslien / Nedregotten	(Japan) Koana / Aoki	€6,000	€1,200		4.7000
26	Jamaica Cup Mixed Doubles Cashspiel; Dundas, Ontario, Jan. 17–18	(Ontario) Brunton / Horgan	(Ontario) Feldkamp / Villard	CA$5,000		Caribbean Cup Mixed Doubles Series	3.5000
26	Sherwood Park Mixed Doubles; Sherwood Park, Alberta, Jan. 16–18	(Japan) Matsumura / Tanida	(Alberta) Peterman / Gallant	CA$6,500	CA$2,000		2.7000
27	GOLDLINE Mixed Doubles Grand-Mère; Grand-Mère, Quebec, Jan. 23–25	(Quebec) Gionest / Desjardins	(Quebec) Sanscartier / Caron	CA$4,000		Circuit Goldline	2.3000
30	GOLDLINE Mixed Doubles Royal Montreal; Montreal, Quebec, Feb. 13–15	(Nova Scotia) Powers / Saunders	(British Columbia) Woo / Wenzek	CA$4,000		Circuit Goldline	1.5000
37	WCT Latvian Mixed Doubles Curling Cup 2 Riga, Latvia, Apr. 2–5	(Denmark) Jensen / Qvist	(Italy) Maurino / Gonin	€1,000		World Curling	1.0000
38	Mixed Doubles Players' Championship; Dundas, Ontario Apr. 9–12	(Manitoba) Lott / Lott	(Poland) Walczak / Augustyniak			Super Series	3.2000
38	Mixed Doubles Prague Trophy; Prague, Czech Republic Apr. 9–12	(Czech Republic) Zelingrová / Chabičovský	(Czech Republic) Farková / Jakl	€3,000		World Curling	1.1000
39	Baden Open; Baden, Switzerland, Apr. 17–19	(Norway) Skaslien / Nedregotten	(Estonia) Kaldvee / Lill	CHF 10,000		World Curling	4.2000
39	Polish Mixed Doubles Curling League; Łódź, Poland, Apr. 17–19	Cancelled					

== World Curling team rankings ==
Men

Final Standings
#	Skip	YTD	OOM
1	(Scotland) Bruce Mouat	465.9	465.9
2	(Alberta) Brad Jacobs	444.9	444.9
3	(Manitoba) Matt Dunstone	422.0	422.0
4	(Switzerland) Yannick Schwaller	411.9	411.9
5	(Scotland) Ross Whyte	373.8	373.8
6	(United States) John Shuster	278.0	278.0
7	(United States) Daniel Casper	277.8	277.8
8	(Sweden) Niklas Edin	275.9	275.9
9	(Italy) Joël Retornaz	271.1	271.1
10	(Ontario) John Epping	249.9	249.9
11	(Scotland) Kyle Waddell	238.9	238.9
12	(Norway) Magnus Ramsfjell	229.9	229.9
13	(China) Xu Xiaoming	219.0	219.0
14	(Switzerland) Marco Hösli	194.7	194.7
15	(Saskatchewan) Mike McEwen	182.8	182.8

Women

Final Standings
#	Skip	YTD	OOM
1	(Switzerland) Silvana Tirinzoni	505.1	505.1
2	(Ontario) Rachel Homan	499.6	499.6
3	(Sweden) Anna Hasselborg	354.1	354.1
4	(Switzerland) Xenia Schwaller	342.8	342.8
5	(Manitoba) Kerri Einarson	339.9	339.9
6	(South Korea) Gim Eun-ji	321.8	321.8
7	(Japan) Satsuki Fujisawa	267.0	267.0
8	(South Korea) Ha Seung-youn	260.7	260.7
9	(United States) Tabitha Peterson	252.0	252.0
10	(Sweden) Isabella Wranå	249.2	249.2
11	(Japan) Momoha Tabata	233.4	233.4
12	(Japan) Sayaka Yoshimura	232.8	232.8
13	(Denmark) Madeleine Dupont	211.6	211.6
14	(China) Wang Rui	201.6	201.6
15	(South Korea) Kang Bo-bae	193.6	193.6

Mixed Doubles

Final Standings
#	Team	YTD	OOM
1	(Australia) Gill / Hewitt	257.5	257.5
2	(United States) Thiesse / Dropkin	212.2	212.2
3	(Norway) Skaslien / Nedregotten	186.7	186.7
4	(Sweden) Westman / Ahlberg	179.6	179.6
5	(South Korea) Kim / Jeong	179.3	179.3
6	(Japan) Koana / Aoki	166.8	166.8
7	(Ontario) Ford / Campbell	150.3	150.3
8	(China) Ye / Yu	150.1	150.1
9	(Sweden) Wranå / Wranå	142.7	142.7
10	(Alberta) Gray-Withers / Pietrangelo	139.4	139.4
11	(Czech Republic) Zelingrová / Chabičovský	136.5	136.5
12	(Scotland) Dodds / Mouat	131.8	131.8
13	(Switzerland) Perret / Rios	118.4	118.4
14	(Italy) Constantini / Mosaner	115.6	115.6
15	(Estonia) Kaldvee / Lill	114.8	114.8

== Notable team changes ==
=== Retirement Announcements ===
- (Saskatchewan) Jolene Campbell: Campbell, notably the alternate on Amber Holland's 2011 Scotties championship team and 2011 World Championship silver medallist, announced her retirement. Campbell was also a two-time provincial champion skip, and made 6 total Scotties appearances.
- Reid Carruthers: Carruthers, the second on Jeff Stoughton's 2011 Brier and 2011 World Men's Curling Championship winning team, an 8-time Manitoba Provincial Men's Curling Championship winner, as well as two Grand Slam of Curling titles, announced his retirement at the end of the season. Carruthers also won the 2017 Canadian Mixed Doubles Curling Championship with Joanne Courtney, where they went on to win silver at the 2017 World Mixed Doubles Curling Championship.
- Martin Crête: The thirteen time Brier participant for Quebec announced his retirement alongside teammates Jean-Michel Ménard and Jean-François Trépanier. A longtime teammate of Ménard's, Crête played third and second throughout his career on a member of the Ménard and Mike Fournier rinks.
- (Sweden) Niklas Edin: The three-time Olympic medalist announced his retirement after clinching his eighth world championship title. During his career, Edin earned several distinctions, becoming the only skip to win three Olympic medals and eight world titles. He also won eight European Championships in addition to four Grand Slam of Curling titles, seven Swedish Men's titles and gold medals at the 2004 World Junior Curling Championships and 2009 Winter Universiade.
- (Newfoundland and Labrador) Brad Gushue: One of the most successful men's curlers in Canadian history as a record six-time Brier champion, including three in a row from 2022 to 2024, Gushue announced that he will be retiring at the end of the season. He has represented Canada twice at the Olympics, skipping his team to Olympic gold in 2006 in Turin, and bronze in 2022 in Beijing. Gushue has 15 Grand Slam titles, one world championship gold (2017) and four silvers (2018, 2022, 2023, 2024) on his resume. Gushue also co-authored a book in 2006 with Alex J. Walling titled Golden Gushue: a Curling Story, which provided a behind-the-scenes look at the rise of his team to Olympic gold.
- (Manitoba) E. J. Harnden: An Olympic gold medalist at the 2014 Sochi Winter Games as the second of the Canadian team skipped by his cousin Brad Jacobs, announced his retirement at the end of the competitive season. Throughout his career, he has curled on teams skipped by Jacobs, Brad Gushue, and Matt Dunstone, winning 10 Grand Slam titles. Harnden has also won four silver medals at the World Curling Championships (2013, 2022, 2023, 2024) and four Brier titles (2013, 2023, 2024, 2026). Harnden and his Olympic gold medalist team were known for their physical fitness, described as "fitness freaks" and "embraced curling's athletic evolution as much or more than any other team", helping to start the movement of more curling athletes embracing fitness and spending equal time "on the curling ice and at the gym".
- Jasmin Holtermann: Holtermann announced she would be stepping away from competitive curling shortly after the 2026 Winter Olympics. As a member of the Danish women's team, Holtermann competed in back-to-back Olympic Games (2022, 2026), four World Championships and six European Championships, winning gold in 2022. She also represented Denmark at four World Mixed Doubles Curling Championships with husband Henrik Holtermann with their best finish of ninth coming in 2023.
- (South Korea) Kim Yeong-mi: Gangneung City Hall athlete Kim, former lead and recent alternate on Kim Eun-jung's silver medal-winning team at the Olympics in 2018, announced her retirement at the end of the season and will return to her hometown of Uiseong County, where she has been appointed as the elementary division coach for Uiseong County Office. She represented Korea four times at the Women's World Championship, most notably where she won the silver medal in 2022. The six time Korean Women's Championshion also won gold at the Pacific-Asia Championships in 2016 and 2017.
- Jean-Michel Ménard: Ménard, a 13-time Quebec Tankard champion and the first Francophone skip to win The Brier in 2006, as well as a world silver medalist at the 2006 World Men's Curling Championship, announced his retirement at the end of the season. Ménard was also an accomplished mixed curler, winning two Canadian Mixed titles in 2001 and 2021, and would also win a world championship title at the 2022 World Mixed Curling Championship.
- Rebecca Morrison: The fourth of Team Sophie Jackson, who also made her Olympic debut representing Great Britain at the Milan Cortina Winter Olympic Games this season, decided to retire from international curling. Representing Scotland, the 29 year old who claimed her first European silver medal at the 2025 European Curling Championships earlier this season, has also won two European bronze medals (2022, 2024), two Scottish national women's titles, as well as four World Women's Curling Championship appearances.
- Gaute Nepstad: Nepstad, the lead on team Magnus Ramsfjell, who throughout his career was a Gold Medalist at the 2019 Winter Universiade, bronze medalist at the 2024 European Curling Championships, as well as represented Norway at the 2026 Olympics and 4 World Men's Curling Championships, announced his retirement at the end of the season to "pursue other personal goals".
- (Ontario) Krista Scharf: Scharf — most of her career going by the name Krista McCarville — who is most well known for skipping her rink and doing well at major tournaments such as the Scotties and Canadian Olympic Curling Trials, despite not playing many tour events (their team mission to be the "best 'amateur' team in the World") announced her retirement from competitive curling at the end of the season. Scharf throughout her career has participated at 13 Scotties, with 2 silver medals (2016, 2022) and 2 bronze medals (2010, 2023). Scharf has also finished third at two Canadian Olympic Trials (2009, 2021).
- (Manitoba) Dennis Thiessen: One of the prominent members of the Canadian Wheelchair Curling Program and advocate of wheelchair curling, as well as an inductee into the Canadian Curling Hall of Fame, Thiessen announced his retirement from competitive curling. Thiessen throughout his career, has represented Canada at 3 Paralympic Winter Games, winning gold at Sochi 2014, and bronze at both PyeongChang 2018 and Beijing 2022. He also won gold in 2013 and silver in 2020 over five appearances at the World Wheelchair Curling Championships, as well as one bronze medal at the 2023 World Wheelchair Mixed Doubles Championship.
- (Switzerland) Silvana Tirinzoni: Tirinzoni, one of the most decorated female curlers of all time — with her team currently ranked Number 1 in the world — announced her retirement at the end of the season. As a skip, Tirinzoni was a four-time World Champion (2019, 2021, 2022, 2023), and three-time Olympian (2018, 2022, 2026), winning the silver medal in the 2026 edition of the event. Tirinzoni is also notably a former World Junior Curling Champion, two-time European champion, and seven-time Grand Slam of Curling champion.
- Jean-François Trépanier: The former hockey player turned curler announced his retirement alongside teammates Jean-Michel Ménard and Martin Crête. Trépanier competed in six Briers for Quebec throughout his career as well as participated in the 2021 and 2025 Canadian Olympic Curling Pre-Trials.

=== Career on hiatus from team curling ===
- Sarah Anderson: Anderson announced that she would be stepping back from women's curling. After playing competitively for over a decade in the women's game in the United States, she was a United States Women's National Champion in 2019 and 2021, and a World Junior silver medalist in 2016.
- Jenn Baxter: Baxter, a longtime member of Christina Black's Nova Scotia rink, decided to "step away from competitive curling for now". With Black, Baxter earned a silver medal at the 2025 Canadian Olympic Curling Trials, a bronze medal at the 2025 Scotties Tournament of Hearts and won three Nova Scotia Women's Curling Championships. She also won bronze at the 2018 Scotties Tournament of Hearts while playing for Mary-Anne Arsenault.
- (Ontario) Mat Camm: Camm announced he'd be taking a break from competitive curling with the disbandment of Team Scott Howard. During his career, Camm was the longtime third for John Epping, playing in five Brier's and winning two Grand Slam of Curling events.
- (Manitoba) Kristin Gordon: Gordon, notably a lead for teams skipped by Tracy Fleury, Kerri Einarson, and Kaitlyn Lawes, announced that she'd be stepping back from competitive curling for a season after Team Lawes disbanded. Gordon was a silver medalist at the 2021 Canadian Olympic Curling Trials and at the 2018 and 2026 Scotties Tournament of Hearts.
- (Saskatchewan) Matthew Hall: After playing for Rylan Kleiter for three seasons, Hall decided to take a break from competitive play. Hall is a former Canadian and World junior champion and finished 3–5 at the 2025 Montana's Brier.
- (Switzerland) Carole Howald: Howald, an Olympic Silver medalist from 2026, a six-time World Women's Curling Champion - winning five titles as alternate for Teams Binia Feltscher and Alina Pätz and one as second for Silvana Tirinzoni in 2023, as well as a three-time European Curling Champion and five-time Grand Slam of Curling champion, announced that she'd be stepping back from competitive team curling to focus on mixed doubles and Rock League.
- (Manitoba) Kaitlyn Lawes: Lawes, a two-time Olympic Gold Medalist (2014, 2018) and 2018 World Champion, announced she'd be stepping away from competitive curling for one season after her team disbanded. Lawes was a long-time third for Jennifer Jones, and returned to skipping in 2022. Lawes also has won 6 Grand Slam of Curling titles, and is a silver medalist at the 2026 Scotties Tournament of Hearts.
- Marc Muskatewitz: Muskatewitz, who represented Germany eight times at the World Men's Curling Championship and made his Olympic debut this year as the skip of the German team in Milano Cortina, announced that he will be taking a step back from competitive curling due to "personal reasons". Muskatewitz also upset Scotland's Bruce Mouat in the final of the 2024 European Curling Championships, as his team became the first German team to capture the men's title in 20 years. Muskatewitz will however continue to play in the Rock League.
- Connor Njegovan: The career lead from Manitoba announced he would be taking a break from competitive curling as he and wife Selena Njegovan welcome twins during the offseason. Njegovan participated in six Briers throughout his career and played on teams skipped by Jeff Stoughton, Brad Jacobs, Reid Carruthers and Jason Gunnlaugson.
- (Alberta) Ashton Skrlik: Skrlik announced she'd be taking a break from the competitive game after playing for her sister Kayla for over a decade. In 2025, she finished fourth at the Scotties Tournament of Hearts and competed in the Canadian Olympic Curling Trials, placing sixth.

=== Team line-up changes pre-season ===
Teams listed by skip, new teammates listed in bold

- (British Columbia) Kayla MacMillan: After parting ways with their third Sarah Daniels, MacMillan added three time Alberta Scotties Champion **Brittany Tran** as third, as well as three time Scotties silver medalist and two time world junior champion **Lauren Lenentine** as their alternate. Second Lindsay Dubue and lead Sarah Loken remained in their same positions as last season.
- (Manitoba) Jordon McDonald: Following two seasons together, McDonald announced they have parted ways with third Dallas Burgess and added two time world junior champion **Jacques Gauthier** as their new third for the 2025–26 season.
- Darren Moulding: After taking a year hiatus from competitive curling, Moulding announced he would be skipping a new team out of Alberta, alongside **Kyler Kleibrink**, **Andrew Nerpin**, and **Evan Crough**
- Owen Purcell: After parting ways with second Scott Saccary, Team Purcell announced Ontario curler Gavin Lydiate would be joining their Nova Scotia rink at second. Third Luke Saunders and lead Ryan Abraham remained in their positions.
- Derek Samagalski: Samagalski, who has spent his 20-year career in Manitoba mostly playing front end for the likes of Reid Carruthers, Mike McEwen, and Brad Jacobs, announced that he will skip his own team out of Nunavut, alongside Sheldon Wettig, Brady St. Louis, and Christian Smitheran.
- (United States) Delaney Strouse: After Sarah Anderson announced that she would be retiring from competitive play, the remaining members of Team Delaney Strouse announced that they would be joined by **Madison Bear**, who will now skip the team and throw lead stones. Strouse will throw fourth stones, Sydney Mullaney as second, and Anne O'Hara moving up to third. However, the team would continue to be referred to as Team Delaney Strouse.
- (Quebec) Laurie St-Georges: After the departure of Lisa Weagle and Jamie Sinclair, St-Georges added Québec Scotties Champion **Émilia Gagné** as third and BC Junior Champion **Sarah Daniels** as lead, with Emily Riley continuing to play second.

=== Team line-up changes following the season ===
- Hailey Armstrong: Three of the members of the current Ontario Women's Curling Champions; Grace Lloyd, Michaela Robert and Rachel Steele, announced on February 16 that they were leaving Team Armstrong "due to philosophical differences" and "exploring new opportunities together next year".
- (British Columbia) Corryn Brown: Team Brown announced they would be disbanding shortly after losing the final of the 2026 BC Women's Curling Championship. During their over 15-year run together, Brown, Erin Pincott and Samantha Fisher won the 2011 Canada Winter Games, the 2013 Canadian Junior Curling Championships and represented BC at four Scotties Tournament of Hearts, reaching the playoffs in 2025.
- (Manitoba) Kate Cameron: Team Cameron announced in February that their team would disband following the end of the season. The team, which included Briane Harris, Taylor McDonald and Mackenzie Elias failed to qualify for the 2026 Scotties Tournament of Hearts.
- (Saskatchewan) Jolene Campbell: After a 3–5 finish at the 2026 Scotties Tournament of Hearts, Team Campbell announced their disbandment with Campbell herself retiring from competitive curling.
- (Italy) Stefania Constantini: The Italian champions announced their disbanded after a disappointing 5–7 finish at the 2026 World Women's Curling Championship. The team had their most successful season during the 2023–24 season, earning a silver medal at the 2023 European Curling Championships and finishing fourth at the 2024 World Women's Curling Championship. They also competed in twelve Grand Slam events during the 2022–2026 Olympic quadrennial, reaching the playoffs in five of them.
- (Manitoba) Kerri Einarson: Team Einarson announced at the end of the season that they have parted ways with third Val Sweeting, alternate Krysten Karwacki and coach Reid Carruthers. Together, Einarson has won four consecutive Scotties Tournament of Hearts titles from 2020-23, also capturing back-to-back bronze medals at the World Women's Curling Championship in 2022 and 2023. Team Einarson this season also finished third at the 2025 Canadian Olympic Curling Trials, won the 2026 Scotties Tournament of Hearts, and earned a silver medal at the 2026 World Women's Curling Championship.
- (Ontario) John Epping: Team Epping announced on February 4 that brothers Jake and Tanner Horgan, who played third and second, have left the team to explore new opportunities. As Epping did not qualify for this seasons Brier, the remaining members of Team Epping (skip John Epping and lead Ian McMillan) decided to end their season in February and withdraw from scheduled tour events, and that they would begin to explore new options for next season.
- (Japan) Satsuki Fujisawa: After an eleven-year run with Loco Solare, third Chinami Yoshida announced she'd be leaving the team. During their time together, Team Fujisawa were the most dominant Japanese women's team, earning Olympic silver and bronze in 2022 and 2018 respectively. They also earned a silver medal at the 2016 World Women's Curling Championship in their inaugural season and won the 2023 Canadian Open Grand Slam.
- James Grattan: The New Brunswick lineup announced Joel Krats would be stepping away from the team after three years together. At the 2026 Montana's Brier, the team just missed the playoffs with a 5–3 record.
- Serena Gray-Withers: After two seasons together, Team Gray-Withers parted ways with second Lindsey Burgess. During the 2025–26 season, the Gray-Withers rink won the U25 NextGen Classic and finished runner-up at the 2026 Alberta Women's Curling Championship.
- (South Korea) Ha Seung-youn: Team Ha will disband after this season, with the back end Ha Seung-youn and Kim Hye-rin pairing up with Kim Cho-hi and Kim Seon-yeong from the newly split team of Kim Eun-jung; both front players Yang Tae-i and Kim Su-jin together with alternate and new third Park Seo-jin will team up with Park You-been, who will take over as skip.
- Scott Howard: Team Howard announced their disbandment on March 19. At the 2026 Ontario Tankard, the team had a disappointing fourth-place finish.
- (South Korea) Kim Eun-jung: Team Kim announced in March they would be going in different directions after a 17-year run together dating back to 2009. During that time, they won silver medals at the 2018 Winter Olympics and 2022 World Women's Curling Championship as well as six Korean national titles. Kim will move back to her hometown of Uiseong joining her hometown team, Uiseong County Office, where she will pair up with the young team of Kim Su-hyeon.
- (Alberta) Kevin Koe: Team Koe announced that Tyler Tardi would be leaving the team to "pursue other curling opportunities". Tardi joined Team Koe at third during the 2022–23 season, and captured a Grand Slam of Curling title that season at the 2023 Players' Championship. Team Koe, which also features second Aaron Sluchinski and lead Karrick Martin, also earned silver at the 2026 Montana's Brier where they lost 6–3 to Manitoba's Matt Dunstone after going undefeated leading up to the final.
- (Manitoba) Kaitlyn Lawes: Team Lawes announced that they would be disbanding as Kaitlyn Lawes and Kristin Gordon will be taking a year off competitive curling, and Selena Njegovan and second Jocelyn Peterman would be searching for new opportunities. This season, Team Lawes would notably win a silver medal at the 2026 Scotties Tournament of Hearts, and finish 5th at the 2025 Canadian Olympic Curling Trials.
- (British Columbia) Kayla MacMillan: After just one season with the team, third Brittany Tran left Team MacMillan alongside longtime lead Sarah Loken.
- (Saskatchewan) Mike McEwen: Team McEwen announced following the Brier on social media that third Colton Flasch, second Kevin Marsh and lead Daniel Marsh have "chosen a different path" without skip McEwen for next season. Over their three seasons together, the team notably was the runner-up at the 2024 Montana's Brier, and finished third at the 2025 Canadian Olympic Curling Trials. On March 14th, Flash and the Marsh Brothers announced that Tyler Tardi would be joining the new team as their skip.
- Sam Mooibroek: The 2025 Ontario champions decided to call it quits after two seasons together. At the 2025 Montana's Brier, they finished just outside the playoff picture at 4–4. The following year, they lost the final of the 2026 Ontario Tankard to Jayden King.
- (Alberta) Myla Plett: The reigning Canadian junior champions announced they'd be splitting up with Alyssa Nedohin, Chloe Fediuk and Allie Iskiw shifting their focus to school. Team Plett dominated Canadian junior curling during their four-year run together, winning the 2023 and 2025 Canadian Junior Curling Championships as well as the 2023 Canadian U18 Curling Championships.
- (Nova Scotia) Owen Purcell: After just one season as a squad, Team Purcell announced they would be exploring new opportunities for the 2026–27 season.
- (Italy) Joël Retornaz: The Italian national men's team announced they'd be splitting up after four seasons together. During the 2023–24 season, the team rose to number one in the world and won three consecutive Grand Slam events. They also won bronze medals at the 2022 European Curling Championships and 2024 World Men's Curling Championship.
- (Alberta) Kayla Skrlik: Team Skrlik announced on March 11th that they will disband after this season.
- (Quebec) Laurie St-Georges: After failing to qualify for the 2026 Scotties Tournament of Hearts, Sarah Daniels announced she would be parting ways with the team after just one season.
- (Alberta) Johnson Tao: Team Tao disbanded after six seasons together for skip Johnson Tao, second Benjamin Morin and lead Andrew Nowell. Third Kenan Wipf also left the team to focus on career priorities. In 2023, Tao and Morin won the 2023 Canadian Junior Curling Championships.
- (Switzerland) Silvana Tirinzoni: Ending the season as the number one ranked team in the world, the team formally announced their split alongside the retirement of their skip, Silvana Tirinzoni. Second Carole Howald also stepped away from the team to focus on mixed doubles and Rock League. During their eight years together, Tirinzoni and fourth Alina Pätz were one of the most dominant duos in women's curling, capturing four consecutive World Women's titles and five Grand Slam titles. At the 2026 Winter Olympics, they won the silver medal.
- Nathan Young: The 2026 Newfoundland and Labrador Tankard champions split after a 3–5 record at the 2026 Montana's Brier.

Preceded by 2024–25	2025–26 curling season May 2025 – May 2026	Succeeded by 2026–27
