= Rock League =

Professional mixed-gender curling league

- Upcoming season or competition: 2026 Rock League season
- Classification: Professional curling league
- Sport: Curling
- Founded: April 24, 2025
- First season: 2026
- Owner: The Curling Group
- Motto: "Curling Unleashed"
- No. of teams: 6
- Most recent champion: 🦌 Shield Curling Club (Jacobs)
- Related competitions: Grand Slam of Curling
- Website: www.rockleague.com

Rock League is a professional curling league operated by The Curling Group, who also own the Grand Slam of Curling. Rock League launched April 6, 2026, consisting of 6 franchised teams consisting of men, women and mixed teams.

== History ==
In April 2024, the Grand Slam of Curling, a series of curling bonspiels that was mainly held in Canada, was announced to be bought by a consortium known as The Curling Group. The group included curlers Jennifer Jones and John Morris, alongside former American football players-turned curlers Jared Allen and Marc Bulger.

On April 24, 2025, The Curling Group announced a professional curling league known as Rock League, which would begin play in April 2026 and hold events in Canada, the United States, and Europe. The league would initially consist of 6 globally franchised teams, with each team having five men and five women. The inaugural season would consist of six weeks of bonspiels in multiple formats. Bruce Mouat, one of the six team captains announced that same day, likened the potential impact that Rock League would have on the momentum of the sport, which usually only sees a surge of interest during the Winter Olympics, to how Grand Slam Track was meant to increase momentum in track and field after the 2024 Summer Olympics in Paris. Curling legends John Morris and Jennifer Jones were also announced as competition advisors.

== Teams ==
The six teams announced with the founding of Rock League on April 24, 2025, are franchises that initially are owned by The Curling Group itself. Each team consists of ten curlers, five of whom are male and five that are female. For the inaugural season in 2026, each of the six teams will be regionally focused. Two teams each will represent Canada and Europe, with the United States and the wider Asia-Pacific region each having a team. Each team also announced a team captain on that same day.

Team	Team captain
Team Canada 1	(Canada) Rachel Homan
Team Canada 2	(Canada) Brad Jacobs
(European Union) Team Europe 1	(Scotland) Bruce Mouat
(European Union) Team Europe 2	(Switzerland) Alina Pätz
Team Asia-Pacific	(Japan) Chinami Yoshida
(United States) Team USA	(United States) Korey Dropkin

Full rosters were announced on December 16, 2025: Roster alterations were announced on March 20.

(European Union) Alpine Curling Club (Europe) GM: (Scotland) Eve Muirhead
Women's players	Men's players
(Switzerland) Alina Pätz (C)	(Italy) Joël Retornaz
(Switzerland) Selina Gafner	(Sweden) Oskar Eriksson
(Canada) Emma Miskew	(Switzerland) Sven Michel
(Sweden) Sofia Scharback	(Scotland) Hammy McMillan Jr.
(Sweden) Almida de Val	(Germany) Marc Muskatewitz
(United States) Frontier Curling Club (USA) GM: (United States) Chris Plys
Women's players	Men's players
(Italy) Stefania Constantini	(United States) Korey Dropkin (C)
(United States) Tabitha Peterson	(Scotland) Grant Hardie
(United States) Taylor Anderson-Heide	~~(Canada) E. J. Harnden~~
(Canada) Sarah Wilkes	(United States) Danny Casper
(United States) Cory Thiesse	(United States) John Shuster
	(United States) Colin Hufman
Maple United (Canada) GM: Glenn Howard
Women's players	Men's players
(Canada) Rachel Homan (C)	~~(Canada) Matt Dunstone~~
(Switzerland) Xenia Schwaller	(Scotland) Ross Whyte
(Sweden) Maria Larsson	(Canada) Colton Flasch
(Canada) Karlee Burgess	(Canada) Tanner Horgan
(Canada) Jocelyn Peterman	(Canada) Brett Gallant
	(Canada) Mike McEwen
(European Union) Northern United (Europe) GM: (Norway) Christoffer Svae
Women's players	Men's players
(Sweden) Isabella Wranå	(Scotland) Bruce Mouat (C)
(Sweden) Sara McManus	(Scotland) Robin Brydone
(Scotland) Jennifer Dodds	(Sweden) Rasmus Wranå
(Italy) Giulia Zardini Lacedelli	(Norway) Martin Sesaker
(Norway) Kristin Skaslien	(Switzerland) Yannick Schwaller
Shield Curling Club (Canada) GM: Carter Rycroft
Women's players	Men's players
(Canada) Kerri Einarson	(Canada) Brad Jacobs (C)
(Canada) Tracy Fleury	(Canada) Jacob Horgan
(Sweden) Agnes Knochenhauer	~~(Canada) Tyler Tardi~~
(Switzerland) Carole Howald	(Canada) Dan Marsh
(Canada) Marlee Powers	~~(Canada) Colton Lott~~
	(Italy) Amos Mosaner
	(Switzerland) Benoît Schwarz-van Berkel
Typhoon Curling Club (Asia-Pacific) GM: (Canada) J. D. Lind
Women's players	Men's players
(Japan) Chinami Yoshida (C)	(Sweden) Niklas Edin
(Sweden) Anna Hasselborg	(Japan) Tsuyoshi Yamaguchi
(South Korea) Kim Min-ji	(Scotland) Bobby Lammie
(South Korea) Seol Ye-eun	(China) Ba Dexin
(Japan) Tori Koana	(New Zealand) Anton Hood

On March 20, 2026, the Rock League announced that Sweden's Linda Stenlund and Italy's Mattia Giovanella would be "super spares" who could play for any team due to an injury or any other vacancy.

== Schedule ==
On December 18, 2025, the Rock League announced its schedule and format for the 2026 and 2027 seasons:

The 2026 season was held April 6–12 at the Mattamy Athletic Centre in Toronto, featuring men's, women's, mixed team and mixed doubles events. Following a round robin schedule, the four best teams qualified for a playoff.

The 2027 season will be spread out over five weeks in January, February and April of that year, with a playoff to be held April 15–18 at Wings Event Center in Kalamazoo, Michigan. The regular season will be held at January 7–10 at Temple Gardens Centre in Moose Jaw, Saskatchewan; January 28–31 at the Adirondack Bank Center in Utica, New York; February 4–7 at TD Place in Ottawa; and April 8–11 at Servus Arena in Red Deer, Alberta.

== Champions ==
Season	Winner	Captain	General Manager	Runner-up	Captain	General Manager	Most Valuable Player	Ultimate Competitor
2026	Shield Curling Club	Brad Jacobs	Carter Rycroft	Typhoon Curling Club	Chinami Yoshida	J. D. Lind	Benoît Schwarz-van Berkel (Shield CC)	Alina Pätz (Alpine CC)
