= 2026 Rock League season =

- Host city: Toronto, Ontario
- Arena: Mattamy Athletic Centre
- Dates: April 6–12
- Winner: 🦌 Shield Curling Club
- Captain: (Canada) Brad Jacobs
- Members: (Switzerland) Benoît Schwarz-van Berkel (Canada) Jacob Horgan (Canada) Dan Marsh (Italy) Amos Mosaner (Canada) Kerri Einarson (Canada) Tracy Fleury (Sweden) Agnes Knochenhauer (Canada) Marlee Powers (Switzerland) Carole Howald
- General Manager: (Canada) Carter Rycroft
- Finalist: 🐉 Typhoon Curling Club (Yoshida)
- Next: 2027

The 2026 Rock League was held from April 6 to 12 at the Mattamy Athletic Centre in Toronto, Ontario. It was the inaugural season of the league and featured 60 of the top players from around the world split into six franchises.

The "Canadian-based" Shield Curling Club, captained by Olympic gold medallist Brad Jacobs won the event, defeating Typhoon Curling Club in the final, 2 games to 1 in front of about 500 fans. With Shield winning the men's final, and Typhoon winning the women's final, the championship came down to the mixed doubles game, which was tied after eight ends. This forced a draw to the button where Shield's Benoît Schwarz-van Berkel put his rock right on the button for the win, and US$100,000 for this team. Schwarz-van Berkel won the event's Most Valuable Player award, winning a bonus US$5,000. Alina Pätz of the Alpine Curling Club won the "Ultimate Competitor" award as voted by her fellow athletes.

While the event was a hit with curlers, its attendance figures were seen as low, even on the championship weekend. Other challenges the event faced were the pulling out of several high profile curlers such as Brier champion Matt Dunstone, and production issues with the broadcast.

== Format ==
Each franchise plays every other franchise once in the round robin. Three games will be played at once, one men's game, one women's game and one mixed doubles game. To win a match, a franchise must win two of three games. Winning a match is worth one point in the standings, while winning all three games is worth an additional half point. Following the round robin, a mixed fours draw will take place with each franchise fielding two teams. Each game will be worth one win toward the overall standings. After the mixed fours draws conclude, the top four teams will advance to the playoffs which will follow the same format as the round robin.

== Rules ==
- Four-player games will be seven ends in duration, with 21 minutes of thinking time per team, plus a 60 second timeout.
- Mixed doubles games will be eight ends in duration, with 23 minutes of thinking time per team, plus a 60 second timeout.
- Teams cannot concede before all ends are played. All rocks must be thrown, unless a team runs out of time.
- If a team runs out of time, they will not lose the game, but will not be allowed to throw anymore rocks. The opposing team may continue to throw.
- In the final end of all games, covering the pinhole is worth two points.
- Tied games are decided by a draw to the button. Any player on the team can throw. If the tie persists, the same players must throw again without sweeping.
- Any rock in the free guard zone may not be 'ticked' until the sixth rock in four-player play or the fourth rock in mixed doubles. If this rule is broken, the non-offending team has the choice to ignore the rule, or remove the offending rock and put their rock back.
- Teams may only be allowed to blank one end per game. A second blank will result in the loss of hammer.
- Teams may challenge hog line violations. Teams will be allowed one incorrect challenge per game, but an incorrect challenge will result in the loss of their timeout or one minute from their clock.
- Last rock advantage in the first end will be determined by a coin flip. The team with the winning coin flip gets hammer in two of the three games (one of which must be the mixed doubles game). On the weekend games, the higher-seeded team chooses which game to start with last rock advantage.

== Teams ==
Each franchise includes five male and female players. The rosters were originally unveiled on December 16, 2025. On March 20, 2026, Benoît Schwarz-van Berkel, Mike McEwen, Colin Hufman and Amos Mosaner were announced as replacements for Tyler Tardi, Matt Dunstone, E. J. Harnden and Colton Lott respectively. Linda Stenlund and Mattia Giovanella were also announced as "super spares". Stenlund replaced Stefania Constantini on Frontier Curling Club for three games and Almida de Val on Alpine Curling Club in one game. Giovanella played for Amos Mosaner on Shield Curling Club in two games.

The teams are listed as follows:

🐻 Maple United	🦌 Shield Curling Club	🐴 Frontier Curling Club
(Canada) Rachel Homan (C); (Switzerland) Xenia Schwaller; (Sweden) Maria Larsson; (Canada) Karlee Burgess; (Canada) Jocelyn Peterman; (Canada) Mike McEwen; (Scotland) Ross Whyte; (Canada) Colton Flasch; (Canada) Tanner Horgan; (Canada) Brett Gallant; (Canada) Glenn Howard (GM)	(Canada) Brad Jacobs (C); (Switzerland) Benoît Schwarz-van Berkel; (Canada) Jacob Horgan; (Canada) Dan Marsh; (Italy) Amos Mosaner; (Canada) Kerri Einarson; (Canada) Tracy Fleury; (Sweden) Agnes Knochenhauer; (Canada) Marlee Powers; (Switzerland) Carole Howald; (Canada) Carter Rycroft (GM)	(United States) Korey Dropkin (C); (United States) John Shuster; (Scotland) Grant Hardie; (United States) Colin Hufman; (United States) Daniel Casper; (Italy) Stefania Constantini; (United States) Tabitha Peterson; (United States) Taylor Anderson-Heide; (Canada) Sarah Wilkes; (United States) Cory Thiesse; (United States) Chris Plys (GM)
🐺 Northern United	🐏 Alpine Curling Club	🐉 Typhoon Curling Club
(Scotland) Bruce Mouat (C); (Scotland) Robin Brydone; (Sweden) Rasmus Wranå; (Norway) Martin Sesaker; (Switzerland) Yannick Schwaller; (Sweden) Isabella Wranå; (Sweden) Sara McManus; (Scotland) Jennifer Dodds; (Italy) Giulia Zardini Lacedelli; (Norway) Kristin Skaslien; (Norway) Christoffer Svae (GM)	(Switzerland) Alina Pätz (C); (Switzerland) Selina Gafner; (Canada) Emma Miskew; (Sweden) Sofia Scharback; (Sweden) Almida de Val; (Italy) Joël Retornaz; (Sweden) Oskar Eriksson; (Switzerland) Sven Michel; (Scotland) Hammy McMillan Jr.; (Germany) Marc Muskatewitz; (Scotland) Eve Muirhead (GM)	(Japan) Chinami Yoshida (C); (Sweden) Anna Hasselborg; (South Korea) Kim Min-ji; (South Korea) Seol Ye-eun; (Japan) Tori Koana; (Sweden) Niklas Edin; (Japan) Tsuyoshi Yamaguchi; (Scotland) Bobby Lammie; (China) Ba Dexin; (New Zealand) Anton Hood; (Canada) J. D. Lind (GM)

== Round robin standings ==
Final Round Robin Standings

Key
Teams to Playoffs

Team	Captain	MW	ML	GW	GL	PF	PA	EW	EL	BE	SE	Pts
🐏 Alpine Curling Club	Alina Pätz	4	3	10	7	106	95	67	55	1	19	4.5
🐺 Northern United	Bruce Mouat	4	3	9	8	104	94	66	57	2	21	4.5
🐉 Typhoon Curling Club	Chinami Yoshida	4	3	8	9	98	106	58	65	2	7	4
🦌 Shield Curling Club	Brad Jacobs	3	4	9	8	110	93	65	56	0	22	3.5
🐻 Maple United	Rachel Homan	3	4	7	10	98	106	57	64	4	12	3
🐴 Frontier Curling Club	Korey Dropkin	3	4	8	9	92	114	54	70	1	8	3

Round Robin Summary Table
Pos.	Club	🐏 Alpine			🐴 Frontier			🐻 Maple			🐺 Northern			🦌 Shield			🐉 Typhoon			Seeding			Game Record	Points
Pos.	Club	M	W	MD	M	W	MD	M	W	MD	M	W	MD	M	W	MD	M	W	MD	Opponent	Mx1	Mx2	Game Record	Points
1	🐏 Alpine Curling Club	—			7–3	7–8	8–4	10–6	6–1	6–11	8–3	4–3	8–7	4–9	8–4	4–6	4–9	7–3	4–7	🐴 Frontier	5–6	6–5	10–7	4.5
6	🐴 Frontier Curling Club	3–7	8–7	4–8	—			8–5	3–7	10–6	10–4	7–6	3–11	6–7	1–10	6–5	2–7	7–3	3–10	🐏 Alpine	6–5	5–6	8–9	3
5	🐻 Maple United	6–10	1–6	11–6	5–8	7–3	6–10	—			4–8	9–4	4–5	3–9	4–5	6–10	6–3	5–6	11–5	🦌 Shield	5–4	5–4	7–10	3
2	🐺 Northern United	3–8	3–4	7–8	4–10	6–7	11–3	8–4	4–9	5–4	—			4–5	5–4	9–6	10–4	7–6	8–5	🐉 Typhoon	4–5	6–2	9–8	4.5
4	🦌 Shield Curling Club	9–4	4–8	6–4	7–6	10–1	5–6	9–3	5–4	10–6	5–4	4–5	6–9	—			6–9	10–7	6–7	🐻 Maple	4–5	4–5	9–8	3.5
3	🐉 Typhoon Curling Club	10–4	3–7	7–4	7–2	3–7	10–3	3–6	6–5	5–11	4–10	6–7	5–8	9–6	7–10	7–6	—			🐺 Northern	5–4	2–6	8–9	4

== Round robin results ==
All draws are listed in Eastern Time (UTC−04:00).

=== Draw 1 ===
Monday, April 6, 12:00 pm

Sheet A	1	2	3	4	5	6	7	Final
🐏 Alpine Curling Club (Pätz) 🔨	2	0	4	1	0	1	0	8
🦌 Shield Curling Club (Einarson)	0	2	0	0	1	0	1	4

Sheet B	1	2	3	4	5	6	7	Final
🐏 Alpine Curling Club (Retornaz)	1	0	2	0	1	0	0	4
🦌 Shield Curling Club (Jacobs) 🔨	0	1	0	4	0	1	3	9

Sheet C	1	2	3	4	5	6	7	8	Final
🐏 Alpine Curling Club (de Val / Eriksson)	0	1	0	1	1	0	1	0	4
🦌 Shield Curling Club (Howald / Schwarz-van Berkel) 🔨	1	0	2	0	0	1	0	2	6

=== Draw 2 ===
Monday, April 6, 3:30 pm

Sheet A	1	2	3	4	5	6	7	Final
🐉 Typhoon Curling Club (Hasselborg)	0	1	0	0	1	0	1	3
🐴 Frontier Curling Club (Constantini) 🔨	1	0	4	1	0	1	0	7

Sheet B	1	2	3	4	5	6	7	Final
🐉 Typhoon Curling Club (Edin) 🔨	2	1	1	0	2	0	1	7
🐴 Frontier Curling Club (Shuster) (Note: Daniel Casper took over as skip mid-way through the game, with Shuster moving to lead)	0	0	0	1	0	1	0	2

Sheet C	1	2	3	4	5	6	7	8	Final
🐉 Typhoon Curling Club (Koana / Yamaguchi) 🔨	1	2	0	2	1	1	0	3	10
🐴 Frontier Curling Club (Thiesse / Dropkin)	0	0	1	0	0	0	2	0	3

=== Draw 3 ===
Monday, April 6, 7:00 pm

Sheet A	1	2	3	4	5	6	7	Final
🐻 Maple United (Homan)	2	0	3	0	1	3	0	9
🐺 Northern United (Wranå) 🔨	0	2	0	1	0	0	1	4

Sheet B	1	2	3	4	5	6	7	Final
🐻 Maple United (McEwen) 🔨	0	1	0	0	2	1	0	4
🐺 Northern United (Mouat)	1	0	1	2	0	0	4	8

Sheet C	1	2	3	4	5	6	7	8	Final
🐻 Maple United (Peterman / Gallant)	1	0	0	1	0	1	1	0	4
🐺 Northern United (Skaslien / Schwaller) 🔨	0	1	2	0	1	0	0	1	5

=== Draw 4 ===
Tuesday, April 7, 12:00 pm

Sheet A	1	2	3	4	5	6	7	Final
🦌 Shield Curling Club (Einarson) 🔨	1	0	1	0	2	0	0	4
🐺 Northern United (Wranå)	0	1	0	1	0	0	3	5

Sheet B	1	2	3	4	5	6	7	Final
🦌 Shield Curling Club (Jacobs)	0	2	1	0	0	0	2	5
🐺 Northern United (Mouat) 🔨	2	0	0	0	1	1	0	4

Sheet C	1	2	3	4	5	6	7	8	Final
🦌 Shield Curling Club (Powers / J. Horgan)	1	1	0	1	0	0	3	0	6
🐺 Northern United (Zardini Lacedelli / Wranå) 🔨	0	0	2	0	2	1	0	4	9

=== Draw 5 ===
Tuesday, April 7, 3:30 pm

Sheet A	1	2	3	4	5	6	7	Final
🐉 Typhoon Curling Club (Hasselborg) 🔨	1	0	3	0	1	0	1	6
🐻 Maple United (Homan)	0	1	0	2	0	2	0	5

Sheet B	1	2	3	4	5	6	7	Final
🐉 Typhoon Curling Club (Edin)	0	0	1	0	0	2	0	3
🐻 Maple United (McEwen) 🔨	2	1	0	1	1	0	1	6

Sheet C	1	2	3	4	5	6	7	8	Final
🐉 Typhoon Curling Club (Koana / Yamaguchi) 🔨	0	1	0	0	2	1	0	1	5
🐻 Maple United (Peterman / Gallant)	4	0	1	1	0	0	5	0	11

=== Draw 6 ===
Tuesday, April 7, 7:00 pm

Sheet A	1	2	3	4	5	6	7	Final
🐴 Frontier Curling Club (Peterson) 🔨	2	0	2	2	0	0	2	8
🐏 Alpine Curling Club (Pätz)	0	3	0	0	2	2	0	7

Sheet B	1	2	3	4	5	6	7	Final
🐴 Frontier Curling Club (Casper)	0	0	0	1	0	2	0	3
🐏 Alpine Curling Club (Retornaz) 🔨	2	0	2	0	1	0	2	7

Sheet C	1	2	3	4	5	6	7	8	Final
🐴 Frontier Curling Club (Anderson-Heide / Dropkin) 🔨	1	0	2	0	0	1	0	0	4
🐏 Alpine Curling Club (de Val / Eriksson)	0	1	0	1	4	0	1	1	8

=== Draw 7 ===
Wednesday, April 8, 12:00 pm

Sheet A	1	2	3	4	5	6	7	Final
🐺 Northern United (Wranå) 🔨	0	2	0	0	0	1	0	3
🐏 Alpine Curling Club (Pätz)	1	0	1	1	1	0	0	4

Sheet B	1	2	3	4	5	6	7	Final
🐺 Northern United (Mouat)	0	1	0	0	0	2	0	3
🐏 Alpine Curling Club (Retornaz) 🔨	3	0	1	1	1	0	2	8

Sheet C	1	2	3	4	5	6	7	8	9	Final
🐺 Northern United (Zardini Lacedelli / Wranå)	0	1	1	0	2	0	0	3	0	7
🐏 Alpine Curling Club (de Val / Eriksson) 🔨	1	0	0	1	0	4	1	0	1	8

=== Draw 8 ===
Wednesday, April 8, 3:30 pm

Sheet A	1	2	3	4	5	6	7	Final
🐻 Maple United (Homan) 🔨	0	0	1	0	4	0	2	7
🐴 Frontier Curling Club (Peterson)	1	0	0	1	0	1	0	3

Sheet B	1	2	3	4	5	6	7	Final
🐻 Maple United (McEwen)	0	1	0	1	0	3	0	5
🐴 Frontier Curling Club (Casper) 🔨	1	0	3	0	1	0	3	8

Sheet C	1	2	3	4	5	6	7	8	Final
🐻 Maple United (Peterman / Gallant)	0	0	3	0	0	1	0	2	6
🐴 Frontier Curling Club (Anderson-Heide / Dropkin) 🔨	2	1	0	2	2	0	3	0	10

=== Draw 9 ===
Wednesday, April 8, 7:00 pm

Sheet A	1	2	3	4	5	6	7	Final
🦌 Shield Curling Club (Einarson) 🔨	3	0	4	2	0	1	0	10
🐉 Typhoon Curling Club (Hasselborg)	0	2	0	0	2	0	3	7

Sheet B	1	2	3	4	5	6	7	Final
🦌 Shield Curling Club (Jacobs)	2	0	1	0	2	1	0	6
🐉 Typhoon Curling Club (Edin) 🔨	0	2	0	4	0	0	3	9

Sheet C	1	2	3	4	5	6	7	8	Final
🦌 Shield Curling Club (Powers / J. Horgan)	0	2	1	0	1	0	2	0	6
🐉 Typhoon Curling Club (Koana / Yamaguchi) 🔨	2	0	0	1	0	2	0	2	7

=== Draw 10 ===
Thursday, April 9, 12:00 pm

Sheet A	1	2	3	4	5	6	7	Final
🐴 Frontier Curling Club (Peterson)	0	0	0	0	1	0	0	1
🦌 Shield Curling Club (Einarson) 🔨	3	2	1	1	0	1	2	10

Sheet B	1	2	3	4	5	6	7	Final
🐴 Frontier Curling Club (Casper) 🔨	1	0	1	0	0	2	2	6
🦌 Shield Curling Club (Jacobs)	0	4	0	1	2	0	0	7

Sheet C	1	2	3	4	5	6	7	8	9	Final
🐴 Frontier Curling Club (Anderson-Heide / Dropkin) 🔨	0	2	0	2	0	0	0	1	1	6
🦌 Shield Curling Club (Powers / Schwarz-van Berkel)	1	0	1	0	1	1	1	0	0	5

=== Draw 11 ===
Thursday, April 9, 3:30 pm

Sheet A	1	2	3	4	5	6	7	Btn	Final
🐺 Northern United (Wranå)	0	1	0	3	0	2	0	1	7
🐉 Typhoon Curling Club (Hasselborg) 🔨	1	0	2	0	1	0	2	0	6

Sheet B	1	2	3	4	5	6	7	Final
🐺 Northern United (Mouat) 🔨	1	4	0	2	0	2	1	10
🐉 Typhoon Curling Club (Edin)	0	0	2	0	2	0	0	4

Sheet C	1	2	3	4	5	6	7	8	Final
🐺 Northern United (Skaslien / Schwaller) 🔨	2	1	1	1	0	2	1	0	8
🐉 Typhoon Curling Club (Koana / Yamaguchi)	0	0	0	0	1	0	0	4	5

=== Draw 12 ===
Thursday, April 9, 7:00 pm

Sheet A	1	2	3	4	5	6	7	Final
🐻 Maple United (Homan)	0	1	0	0	0	0	0	1
🐏 Alpine Curling Club (Pätz) 🔨	1	0	1	1	1	1	1	6

Sheet B	1	2	3	4	5	6	7	Final
🐻 Maple United (McEwen) 🔨	1	0	1	0	0	4	0	6
🐏 Alpine Curling Club (Retornaz)	0	2	0	2	3	0	3	10

Sheet C	1	2	3	4	5	6	7	8	Final
🐻 Maple United (Peterman / T. Horgan) 🔨	1	1	0	3	0	5	0	1	11
🐏 Alpine Curling Club (de Val / Eriksson)	0	0	1	0	3	0	2	0	6

=== Draw 13 ===
Friday, April 10, 12:00 pm

Sheet A	1	2	3	4	5	6	7	Btn	Final
🐴 Frontier Curling Club (Constantini)	0	2	0	0	0	0	4	1	7
🐺 Northern United (Zardini Lacedelli) 🔨	1	0	1	1	2	1	0	0	6

Sheet B	1	2	3	4	5	6	7	Final
🐴 Frontier Curling Club (Hardie) 🔨	3	1	0	3	0	0	3	10
🐺 Northern United (Mouat)	0	0	1	0	2	1	0	4

Sheet C	1	2	3	4	5	6	7	8	Final
🐴 Frontier Curling Club (Thiesse / Dropkin)	0	2	0	0	0	1	0	0	3
🐺 Northern United (Wranå / Wranå) 🔨	2	0	1	1	2	0	3	2	11

=== Draw 14 ===
Friday, April 10, 3:30 pm

Sheet A	1	2	3	4	5	6	7	Final
🐏 Alpine Curling Club (Pätz) 🔨	2	0	2	0	1	0	2	7
🐉 Typhoon Curling Club (Hasselborg)	0	1	0	1	0	1	0	3

Sheet B	1	2	3	4	5	6	7	Final
🐏 Alpine Curling Club (Retornaz)	0	1	0	2	0	1	0	4
🐉 Typhoon Curling Club (Edin) 🔨	2	0	1	0	1	0	5	9

Sheet C	1	2	3	4	5	6	7	8	Final
🐏 Alpine Curling Club (Scharback / Eriksson)	0	1	0	0	1	0	2	0	4
🐉 Typhoon Curling Club (Koana / Yamaguchi) 🔨	1	0	2	1	0	3	0	0	7

=== Draw 15 ===
Friday, April 10, 7:00 pm

Sheet A	1	2	3	4	5	6	7	Final
🦌 Shield Curling Club (Einarson)	0	2	1	2	0	0	0	5
🐻 Maple United (Homan) 🔨	1	0	0	0	0	2	1	4

Sheet B	1	2	3	4	5	6	7	Final
🦌 Shield Curling Club (Jacobs) 🔨	2	0	3	0	2	0	2	9
🐻 Maple United (Whyte)	0	2	0	0	0	1	0	3

Sheet C	1	2	3	4	5	6	7	8	Final
🦌 Shield Curling Club (Powers / Schwarz-van Berkel)	1	0	3	0	2	3	0	1	10
🐻 Maple United (Peterman / T. Horgan) 🔨	0	3	0	2	0	0	1	0	6

=== Draw 16 ===
Saturday, April 11, 12:00 pm

Sheet A	1	2	3	4	5	6	7	Final
🦌 Shield Curling Club (Schwarz-van Berkel / Einarson / Mosaner / Knochenhauer) 🔨	1	0	1	0	1	1	0	4
🐻 Maple United (McEwen / X. Schwaller / T. Horgan / Burgess)	0	2	0	1	0	0	2	5

Sheet B	1	2	3	4	5	6	7	Btn	Final
🦌 Shield Curling Club (Jacobs / Fleury / J. Horgan / Howald)	0	2	0	0	2	0	0	0	4
🐻 Maple United (Whyte / Homan / Gallant / Peterman) 🔨	1	0	1	1	0	0	1	1	5

=== Draw 17 ===
Saturday, April 11, 3:30 pm

Sheet A	1	2	3	4	5	6	7	Final
🐏 Alpine Curling Club (Retornaz / Gafner / Eriksson / Scharback)	0	2	0	2	0	1	0	5
🐴 Frontier Curling Club (Hardie / Constantini / Hufman / Wilkes) 🔨	1	0	1	0	2	0	2	6

Sheet B	1	2	3	4	5	6	7	Final
🐏 Alpine Curling Club (Pätz / Michel / Miskew / McMillan) 🔨	0	1	0	2	0	2	1	6
🐴 Frontier Curling Club (Casper / Peterson / Dropkin / Anderson-Heide)	1	0	1	0	3	0	0	5

=== Draw 18 ===
Saturday, April 11, 7:00 pm

Sheet A	1	2	3	4	5	6	7	Final
🐺 Northern United (Y. Schwaller / I. Wranå / R. Wranå / Zardini Lacedelli)	0	1	0	1	0	1	1	4
🐉 Typhoon Curling Club (Hasselborg / Yamaguchi / Yoshida / Hood) 🔨	2	0	1	0	2	0	0	5

Sheet B	1	2	3	4	5	6	7	Final
🐺 Northern United (Mouat / McManus / Brydone / Dodds) 🔨	1	0	1	0	0	3	1	6
🐉 Typhoon Curling Club (Edin / Kim / Lammie / Seol)	0	1	0	0	1	0	0	2

== Playoffs ==
Semifinals
1	🐏 Alpine Curling Club	0
4	🦌 Shield Curling Club	2
2	🐺 Northern United	0
3	🐉 Typhoon Curling Club	3

Final
4	🦌 Shield Curling Club	2
3	🐉 Typhoon Curling Club	1

=== Semifinal 1 ===
Sunday, April 12, 10:00 am

Sheet A	1	2	3	4	5	6	7	Btn	Final
🐺 Northern United (Wranå)	1	0	1	0	1	1	0	0	4
🐉 Typhoon Curling Club (Hasselborg) 🔨	0	1	0	2	0	0	1	1	5

Sheet B	1	2	3	4	5	6	7	Btn	Final
🐺 Northern United (Mouat) 🔨	0	1	0	2	0	0	1	0	4
🐉 Typhoon Curling Club (Edin)	1	0	1	0	2	0	0	1	5

Sheet C	1	2	3	4	5	6	7	8	Final
🐺 Northern United (Skaslien / Schwaller) 🔨	0	1	1	1	0	1	1	0	5
🐉 Typhoon Curling Club (Koana / Yamaguchi)	2	0	0	0	1	0	0	3	6

=== Semifinal 2 ===
Sunday, April 12, 1:00 pm

Sheet A	1	2	3	4	5	6	7	Final
🐏 Alpine Curling Club (Pätz)	0	0	2	0	1	1	0	4
🦌 Shield Curling Club (Einarson) 🔨	1	1	0	1	0	0	2	5

Sheet B	1	2	3	4	5	6	7	Final
🐏 Alpine Curling Club (Retornaz) 🔨	3	0	2	0	2	0	0	7
🦌 Shield Curling Club (Jacobs)	0	1	0	2	0	0	4	7

Sheet C	1	2	3	4	5	6	7	8	Final
🐏 Alpine Curling Club (Scharback / Eriksson) 🔨	1	0	0	0	1	0	0	X	2
🦌 Shield Curling Club (Powers / Schwarz-van Berkel)	0	1	2	2	0	3	1	X	9

=== Final ===
Sunday, April 12, 4:00 pm

Sheet A	1	2	3	4	5	6	7	Final
🦌 Shield Curling Club (Einarson) 🔨	2	0	1	0	1	1	0	5
🐉 Typhoon Curling Club (Hasselborg)	0	3	0	2	0	0	2	7

Sheet B	1	2	3	4	5	6	7	Final
🦌 Shield Curling Club (Jacobs)	3	0	2	0	3	0	0	8
🐉 Typhoon Curling Club (Edin) 🔨	0	0	0	2	0	3	2	7

Sheet C	1	2	3	4	5	6	7	8	9	Final
🦌 Shield Curling Club (Powers / Schwarz-van Berkel)	0	1	0	2	0	2	0	2	1	8
🐉 Typhoon Curling Club (Koana / Yamaguchi) 🔨	1	0	1	0	3	0	2	0	0	7
