= 2026 Northern Ontario Women's Curling Championship =

Canadian provincial women's curling championship

- Host city: North Bay, Ontario
- Arena: North Bay Granite Club
- Dates: January 7–11
- Winner: Team Scharf
- Curling club: Fort William CC, Thunder Bay
- Skip: Krista Scharf
- Third: Ashley Sippala
- Second: Kendra Lilly
- Lead: Sarah Potts
- Coach: Rick Lang
- Finalist: Robyn Despins

The 2026 Northern Ontario Women's Curling Championship, the Northern Ontario women's curling championship, was held from January 7 to 11 at the North Bay Granite Club in North Bay, Ontario. The winning Krista Scharf rink represented Northern Ontario at the 2026 Scotties Tournament of Hearts, Canada's national women's curling championship in Mississauga, Ontario. The event was held in conjunction with the 2026 Northern Ontario Men's Provincial Curling Championship, the provincial men's championship.

== Teams ==
The teams are listed as follows:

Skip	Third	Second	Lead	Coach	Club
Krysta Burns	Sara Guy	Laura Masters	Laura Forget	Rodney Guy	Northern Credit Union CC, Sudbury
Bella Croisier	Piper Croisier	Mya Smith	Valérie Ouimet	Ryan Lafreniere; Luc Ouimet	Northern Credit Union CC, Sudbury
Abby Deschene	Mackenzie Daley	Mia Toner	Emma Acres	Phil Mainville	North Bay GC, North Bay
Robyn Despins	Nicole Westlund-Stewart	Samantha Morris	Rebecca Carr	Paul Carr	Fort William CC, Thunder Bay
JoAnne Forget	Janelle Courchesne	Jami Bowman	Tay Patterson		North Bay GC, North Bay
Lauren Mann	Oye-Sem Won	Jen Gates	Amanda Gates		Idylwylde G&CC, Sudbury
Krista Scharf	Ashley Sippala	Kendra Lilly	Sarah Potts	Rick Lang	Fort William CC, Thunder Bay

=== Map of teams ===
Northern Ontario Women's Curling Championship Teams

== Round robin standings ==
Final Round Robin Standings

Key
Teams to Playoffs

Skip	W	L	W–L	PF	PA	EW	EL	BE	SE
Krista Scharf	6	0	–	49	26	26	20	5	9
Krysta Burns	4	2	–	49	28	28	18	1	11
Robyn Despins	3	3	1–0	36	36	23	23	2	7
Lauren Mann	3	3	0–1	46	44	25	26	3	2
Bella Croisier	2	4	1–0	31	41	24	27	1	9
Abby Deschene	2	4	0–1	37	39	23	22	4	9
JoAnne Forget	1	5	–	17	51	13	26	4	3

== Round robin results ==
All draws are listed in Eastern Time (UTC−05:00).

=== Draw 1 ===
Wednesday, January 7, 8:30 pm

Sheet C	1	2	3	4	5	6	7	8	9	10	Final
Abby Deschene 🔨	1	0	0	0	2	0	2	1	0	0	6
Krista Scharf	0	0	2	1	0	2	0	0	2	1	8

Sheet E	1	2	3	4	5	6	7	8	9	10	Final
Krysta Burns 🔨	0	1	0	1	1	3	0	1	X	X	7
Bella Croisier	0	0	1	0	0	0	1	0	X	X	2

Sheet F	1	2	3	4	5	6	7	8	9	10	Final
Lauren Mann	0	2	0	0	0	0	0	2	0	1	5
Robyn Despins 🔨	1	0	0	2	0	0	1	0	2	0	6

=== Draw 2 ===
Thursday, January 8, 8:30 am

Sheet E	1	2	3	4	5	6	7	8	9	10	Final
JoAnne Forget	0	0	1	0	1	1	0	2	0	X	5
Lauren Mann 🔨	0	1	0	2	0	0	5	0	1	X	9

=== Draw 3 ===
Thursday, January 8, 1:00 pm

Sheet B	1	2	3	4	5	6	7	8	9	10	Final
Krista Scharf	0	0	3	1	0	0	0	0	0	2	6
Bella Croisier 🔨	0	1	0	0	1	1	1	1	0	0	5

Sheet D	1	2	3	4	5	6	7	8	9	10	Final
Abby Deschene	0	1	1	0	0	2	0	X	X	X	4
Krysta Burns 🔨	1	0	0	2	1	0	6	X	X	X	10

=== Draw 4 ===
Thursday, January 8, 5:30 pm

Sheet B	1	2	3	4	5	6	7	8	9	10	Final
Abby Deschene 🔨	1	0	1	3	1	2	X	X	X	X	8
JoAnne Forget	0	0	0	0	0	0	X	X	X	X	0

Sheet C	1	2	3	4	5	6	7	8	9	10	Final
Robyn Despins 🔨	3	1	0	1	0	1	1	0	2	X	9
Bella Croisier	0	0	1	0	2	0	0	1	0	X	4

Sheet D	1	2	3	4	5	6	7	8	9	10	Final
Krista Scharf 🔨	2	0	2	0	5	1	0	X	X	X	10
Lauren Mann	0	1	0	3	0	0	1	X	X	X	5

=== Draw 5 ===
Friday, January 9, 10:00 am

Sheet D	1	2	3	4	5	6	7	8	9	10	11	Final
Bella Croisier	0	1	0	0	1	3	0	1	0	0	0	6
JoAnne Forget 🔨	1	0	0	0	0	0	1	0	3	1	1	7

Sheet E	1	2	3	4	5	6	7	8	9	10	Final
Robyn Despins 🔨	0	2	0	0	0	1	1	0	0	0	4
Abby Deschene	1	0	0	0	2	0	0	3	0	1	7

=== Draw 6 ===
Friday, January 9, 2:30 pm

Sheet C	1	2	3	4	5	6	7	8	9	10	Final
Lauren Mann 🔨	1	0	4	0	1	0	1	0	0	2	9
Krysta Burns	0	1	0	2	0	1	0	2	2	0	8

=== Draw 7 ===
Friday, January 9, 7:30 pm

Sheet B	1	2	3	4	5	6	7	8	9	10	Final
Krysta Burns	0	1	1	1	0	3	1	1	3	X	11
Robyn Despins 🔨	2	0	0	0	1	0	0	0	0	X	3

Sheet D	1	2	3	4	5	6	7	8	9	10	Final
Lauren Mann	0	1	0	2	0	3	0	4	1	X	11
Abby Deschene 🔨	2	0	1	0	2	0	2	0	0	X	7

Sheet F	1	2	3	4	5	6	7	8	9	10	Final
JoAnne Forget	0	0	1	0	0	0	0	X	X	X	1
Krista Scharf 🔨	0	1	0	3	2	1	3	X	X	X	10

=== Draw 8 ===
Saturday, January 10, 10:00 am

Sheet C	1	2	3	4	5	6	7	8	9	10	Final
JoAnne Forget 🔨	0	1	0	2	0	0	X	X	X	X	3
Robyn Despins	2	0	2	0	3	3	X	X	X	X	10

Sheet E	1	2	3	4	5	6	7	8	9	10	Final
Krista Scharf 🔨	1	3	1	0	2	0	2	0	X	X	9
Krysta Burns	0	0	0	2	0	2	0	1	X	X	5

Sheet F	1	2	3	4	5	6	7	8	9	10	Final
Bella Croisier	0	0	0	0	1	1	1	0	2	1	6
Abby Deschene 🔨	0	0	1	2	0	0	0	2	0	0	5

=== Draw 9 ===
Saturday, January 10, 7:30 pm

Sheet B	1	2	3	4	5	6	7	8	9	10	Final
Bella Croisier	0	2	1	0	1	0	2	0	0	2	8
Lauren Mann 🔨	1	0	0	1	0	1	0	1	3	0	7

Sheet D	1	2	3	4	5	6	7	8	9	10	Final
Robyn Despins	0	0	1	0	1	0	1	0	1	0	4
Krista Scharf 🔨	0	3	0	1	0	1	0	0	0	1	6

Sheet F	1	2	3	4	5	6	7	8	9	10	Final
Krysta Burns 🔨	2	0	0	4	1	1	X	X	X	X	8
JoAnne Forget	0	0	1	0	0	0	X	X	X	X	1

== Playoffs ==
Semifinal			Final
			1	Krista Scharf	10
2	Krysta Burns	5	3	Robyn Despins	7
3	Robyn Despins	7

=== Semifinal ===
Sunday, January 11, 9:00 am

Sheet C	1	2	3	4	5	6	7	8	9	10	Final
Krysta Burns 🔨	0	1	0	1	2	0	0	0	0	1	5
Robyn Despins	1	0	1	0	0	0	2	1	2	0	7

=== Final ===
Sunday, January 11, 1:30 pm

Sheet D	1	2	3	4	5	6	7	8	9	10	Final
Krista Scharf 🔨	1	2	0	3	0	1	0	2	0	1	10
Robyn Despins	0	0	2	0	2	0	2	0	1	0	7

2026 Northern Ontario Women's Curling Championship

Krista Scharf
12th Northern Ontario Provincial Championship title
