= Lindsay Dubue =

Canadian curler (born 1999)

- Curler
- Born: July 23, 1999 (age 27); Ottawa, Ontario

Team
- Curling club: Victoria CC, Victoria, BC
- Skip: Val Sweeting
- Fourth: Kayla MacMillan
- Second: Lindsay Dubue
- Lead: Lauren Lenentine

Curling career
- Member Association: Ontario (2014–2019; 2020–2021); Northern Ontario (2019–2020); British Columbia (2021–present)
- Hearts: 2 (2023, 2024)
- Top CTRS ranking: 5th (2022–23)

Lindsay Dubue (doo-BAY) (born July 23, 1999) is a Canadian curler from Victoria, British Columbia. She currently plays second on Team Kayla MacMillan which is skipped by Val Sweeting.

== Career ==
=== Juniors ===
Dubue played in three Canadian Junior Curling Championships during her junior career in 2017, 2018 and 2020. In 2017, playing second for Hailey Armstrong, she won the silver medal after losing the final Alberta's Kristen Streifel. In both 2018 and 2020, she missed the playoffs playing for Emma Wallingford and Kira Brunton respectively. Also during the 2019–20 season, Team Brunton defeated Cathy Auld in the final of the 2019 Stu Sells Toronto Tankard on the World Curling Tour.

=== Women's ===
During the 2019–20 season, Dubue got to spare for Joanne Courtney on the Rachel Homan rink during the 2019 AMJ Campbell Shorty Jenkins Classic. After a 4–0 record and a win in the quarterfinals, they lost in the semifinal to Tracy Fleury, eliminating them from the tournament.

Dubue joined the Emily Deschenes rink at second for the 2020–21 season. In just their second event together, they defeated the Jennifer Jones rink 6–4 in a round robin game and finished third for the event.

The following season, Dubue moved to British Columbia and joined the Kayla MacMillan rink at second with Jody Maskiewich at third and Sarah Loken at lead. On the tour, the team reached the final of the DeKalb Superspiel where they lost to Amber Holland. At the 2022 British Columbia Scotties Tournament of Hearts, the team qualified for the playoffs through the A Event, defeating defending champions Corryn Brown in the process. They then beat Mary-Anne Arsenault in the 1 vs. 2 game but lost to them in the provincial final 8–6, finishing in second place. They ended the season at the Best of the West event where they reached the semifinals.

For the 2022–23 season, the team added Clancy Grandy as their new skip. In their first event, they finished runner-up to Silvana Tirinzoni at the Summer Series. The following week, they defeated Team Tirinzoni in the final of the 2022 Martensville International. Later in the fall, Team Grandy competed in the 2022 Tour Challenge Tier 2 event where they went 6–1 to claim the championship title, defeating Jessie Hunkin 8–2 in the final. This qualified the team for the 2023 Canadian Open, which they had to decline their spot at to compete in their provincial championship. Back on tour, the team had a semifinal finish at the DeKalb Superspiel and the 2023 International Bernese Ladies Cup. Due to their success throughout the season, they had enough points to qualify for the 2022 Masters, where they finished 1–3. Entering the 2023 British Columbia Scotties Tournament of Hearts as the number one seed, the team lost both the A qualifier and the 1 vs. 2 game to the Corryn Brown rink. Despite this, they were able to defeat Taylor Reese-Hansen 12–4 in the semifinal to qualify for the provincial final. There, they beat Team Brown 10–9 in an extra end to claim the BC provincial title. This qualified them to represent British Columbia on home soil at the 2023 Scotties Tournament of Hearts in Kamloops. After a 5–3 round robin record, Team Grandy beat Quebec's Laurie St-Georges 8–3 in a tiebreaker to move into the championship round. There, they lost 9–4 to Manitoba's Jennifer Jones, eliminating them from contention. The team wrapped up their season at the 2023 Players' Championship and the 2023 Champions Cup Slam events. At both, they lost in tiebreakers to the Tirinzoni and Jones rinks respectively.

Team Grandy did not find the same success during the 2023–24 season, falling from eleventh to thirty-first in the world rankings. In the fall, the team only qualified for the playoffs in four of their ten events. In their four playoff appearances, they never made it past the quarterfinal round. They also had a quarterfinal finish at the 2023 PointsBet Invitational, losing out in the Elite 8. In Grand Slam play, they also struggled, finishing with a 2–10 record through the three events they qualified for. In the new year, however, the team turned things around, winning the 2024 Mercure Perth Masters in the first weekend of 2024. They continued this momentum into the 2024 British Columbia Scotties Tournament of Hearts where they dominated the field, finishing the round robin a perfect 7–0. They then defeated Team Brown in both the 1 vs. 2 game and the provincial final to secure their berth at the 2024 Scotties Tournament of Hearts. At the Hearts, the team won five of their first six games to set themselves up for a playoff spot. However, they lost both of their final games to Rachel Homan and Kate Cameron respectively, finishing 5–3 and eliminating them from contention. In June 2024, Grandy announced she was stepping back from competitive curling to focus on "other opportunities", and moved to Scotland to take up a coaching job with British Curling. MacMillan would move up to skip, and add Sarah Daniels as their new third. In their first year together, Team MacMillan would fail to repeat as BC Women's champions, losing 10–7 in the final of the 2025 BC Women's Curling Championship to BC rivals Team Brown. At the end of the season, Team MacMillan would part ways with their third Sarah Daniels, and add three-time Alberta Scotties Champion Brittany Tran as third, as well as three time Scotties silver medalist and two time world junior champion Lauren Lenentine as their alternate.

Team MacMillan would have a strong start to the 2025–26 curling season, winning the 2025 Icebreaker Challenge, and qualifying for the 2025 Canadian Olympic Curling Pre-Trials. At the Pre-Trials, Team MacMillan would have a good week, but would finish in second place, losing to Selena Sturmay 2 games to 1 in the best-of-three final for the sole spot at the Canadian Olympic Trails.

== Personal life ==
Dubue took human kinetics at the University of Ottawa. She formerly worked as a physiotherapy assistant with HW Health Sport Science Rehab & Performance, and currently works as a high performance development coordinator with Curl BC.

== Teams ==
Season	Skip	Third	Second	Lead	Alternate
2014–15	Kayla MacMillan	Sarah Daviau	Lindsay Dubue	Marcia Richardson	
2015–16	Kayla MacMillan	Sarah Daviau	Lindsay Dubue	Marcia Richardson	
2016–17	Hailey Armstrong	Grace Holyoke	Lindsay Dubue	Marcia Richardson	
2017–18	Emma Wallingford	Grace Holyoke	Lindsay Dubue	Hannah Wallingford	
2018–19	Lindsay Kastrau	Sarah Daviau	Lindsay Dubue	Hannah Wallingford	
2019–20	Kira Brunton	Lindsay Dubue	Calissa Daly	Jessica Leonard	
2020–21	Emily Deschenes	Emma Artichuk	Lindsay Dubue	Michaela Robert	Grace Lloyd
2021–22	Kayla MacMillan	Jody Maskiewich	Lindsay Dubue	Sarah Loken	
2022–23	Clancy Grandy	Kayla MacMillan	Lindsay Dubue	Sarah Loken	
2023–24	Clancy Grandy	Kayla MacMillan	Lindsay Dubue	Sarah Loken	
2024–25	Kayla MacMillan	Sarah Daniels	Lindsay Dubue	Sarah Loken	
2025–26	Kayla MacMillan	Brittany Tran	Lindsay Dubue	Sarah Loken	Lauren Lenentine
2026–27	Kayla MacMillan (Fourth)	Val Sweeting (Skip)	Lindsay Dubue	Lauren Lenentine	
