= 2023 Players' Championship =

Grand Slam of Curling event

2023 Princess Auto Players' Championship
- Host city: Toronto, Ontario
- Arena: Mattamy Athletic Centre
- Dates: April 11–16
- Men's winner: (Alberta) Team Koe
- Curling club: The Glencoe Club, Calgary
- Skip: Kevin Koe
- Third: Tyler Tardi
- Second: Brad Thiessen
- Lead: Karrick Martin
- Finalist: (Switzerland) Yannick Schwaller
- Women's winner: (Sweden) Team Wranå
- Curling club: Sundbybergs CK, Sundbyberg
- Skip: Isabella Wranå
- Third: Almida de Val
- Second: Maria Larsson
- Lead: Linda Stenlund
- Coach: Jason Gunnlaugson
- Finalist: (Switzerland) Silvana Tirinzoni

The 2023 Princess Auto Players' Championship was held from April 11 to 16 at the Mattamy Athletic Centre in Toronto, Ontario. It was the fifth Grand Slam event and final major of the 2022–23 curling season.

In the women's final, Sweden's Isabella Wranå won her first Slam title, defeating the World Champion Silvana Tirinzoni rink from Switzerland 6–5. In the game, Wranå took a commanding lead in the fourth end, making an open hit for three to take a 4–1 lead. Tirinzoni scored a single in the fifth, but Wranå replied by getting a deuce in the sixth. The Tirinzoni rink had a chance to score three in the seventh to even the gap, but fourth thrower Alina Pätz missed a split attempt, but did end up getting two, as at least her shooter rolled in the house to score. In the final end, Wranå only had to hit one Tirinzoni rock on her last to win the title.

In the men's final, Calgary's Kevin Koe rink, defeated Switzerland's Yannick Schwaller team 5–4, giving Koe his fifth Grand Slam title as a skip. Up 1–0 after the first, Koe missed a long raise takeout in the second, allowing Schwaller's last rock thrower Benoît Schwarz to draw for two. Schwaller went up 3–1 after Koe missed an angle raise double in the fourth. Koe made a hit and stick for one in the fifth, and Schwarz replied with a draw to the button in the sixth to go up 4–2. The seventh end was blanked, and in the eighth and final end, Koe with his clock in the single digits on his last rock, made a triple takeout to score three to give his team the win. Koe was in a similar situation in the semifinal, where he had to make a slash double against the Brad Gushue rink with only seconds on remaining on his clock. The game would be the last for Koe's second Bradley Thiessen who stepped back from the game.

Both Teams Wranå and Koe won $40,000 with their wins.

== Qualification ==
The top 12 ranked men's and women's teams on the World Curling Federation's Year-to-Date rankings as of March 13, 2023 qualified for the event. In the event that a team declines their invitation, the next-ranked team on the world team ranking was invited until the field was complete.

=== Men ===
Top Year-to-Date men's teams:

1. (Sweden) Niklas Edin
2. (Manitoba) Matt Dunstone
3. (Italy) Joël Retornaz
4. (Newfoundland and Labrador) Brad Gushue
5. (Alberta) Brendan Bottcher
6. (Switzerland) Yannick Schwaller
7. (Scotland) Bruce Mouat
8. (Alberta) Kevin Koe
9. (United States) Korey Dropkin
10. (Scotland) Ross Whyte
11. (Manitoba) Reid Carruthers
12. (Norway) Magnus Ramsfjell

=== Women ===
Top Year-to-Date women's teams:

1. (Manitoba) Kerri Einarson
2. (Switzerland) Silvana Tirinzoni
3. (Ontario) Tracy Fleury
4. (South Korea) Gim Eun-ji
5. (Manitoba) Jennifer Jones
6. (Japan) Satsuki Fujisawa
7. (Manitoba) Kaitlyn Lawes
8. (British Columbia) Clancy Grandy
9. (Sweden) Anna Hasselborg
10. (Sweden) Isabella Wranå
11. (Alberta) Casey Scheidegger
12. (Manitoba) ~~Meghan Walter~~
13. (United States) Tabitha Peterson

== Men ==
=== Teams ===
The teams are listed as follows:

Skip	Third	Second	Lead	Locale
Brendan Bottcher	Marc Kennedy	Brett Gallant	Ben Hebert	Calgary, Alberta
Reid Carruthers	Brad Jacobs (Note: Brad Jacobs replaced Jason Gunnlaugson, who parted ways with Team Carruthers following the 2022 Masters.)	Derek Samagalski	– (Note: Team Carruthers played with three players with lead Connor Njegovan on paternity leave.)	Winnipeg, Manitoba
Korey Dropkin (Fourth)	Andrew Stopera (Skip)	Mark Fenner	Thomas Howell	(United States) Duluth, Minnesota
Matt Dunstone	B. J. Neufeld	Colton Lott	Ryan Harnden	Winnipeg, Manitoba
Niklas Edin	Oskar Eriksson	Rasmus Wranå	Christoffer Sundgren	Karlstad, Sweden
Brad Gushue	Mark Nichols	E. J. Harnden	Geoff Walker	St. John's, Newfoundland and Labrador
Kevin Koe	Tyler Tardi	Brad Thiessen	Karrick Martin	Calgary, Alberta
Bruce Mouat	Grant Hardie	Bobby Lammie	Hammy McMillan Jr.	Stirling, Scotland
Magnus Ramsfjell	Martin Sesaker	James Craik (Note: James Craik spared for Bendik Ramsfjell.)	Gaute Nepstad	Trondheim, Norway
Joël Retornaz	Amos Mosaner	Sebastiano Arman	Mattia Giovanella	Trentino, Italy
Benoît Schwarz (Fourth)	Yannick Schwaller (Skip)	Sven Michel	Pablo Lachat	Geneva, Switzerland
Ross Whyte	Robin Brydone	Duncan McFadzean	Euan Kyle	Stirling, Scotland

=== Round robin standings ===
Final Round Robin Standings

Key
Teams to Playoffs
Teams to Tiebreakers

Pool A	W	L	PF	PA
(Newfoundland and Labrador) Brad Gushue	4	1	35	16
(Alberta) Kevin Koe	4	1	32	24
(Sweden) Niklas Edin	3	2	32	25
(Alberta) Brendan Bottcher	2	3	22	26
(Norway) Magnus Ramsfjell	2	3	25	30
(United States) Team Dropkin	0	5	16	41

Pool B	W	L	PF	PA
(Italy) Joël Retornaz	4	1	28	17
(Switzerland) Yannick Schwaller	4	1	31	23
(Manitoba) Matt Dunstone	3	2	24	20
(Scotland) Ross Whyte	3	2	24	24
(Manitoba) Reid Carruthers	1	4	19	30
(Scotland) Bruce Mouat	0	5	20	32

=== Round robin results ===
All draw times are listed in Eastern Time (UTC−04:00).

==== Draw 1 ====
Tuesday, April 11, 11:30 am

Sheet A	1	2	3	4	5	6	7	8	Final
(Italy) Joël Retornaz	0	2	0	0	3	0	1	X	6
(Scotland) Bruce Mouat 🔨	1	0	1	0	0	1	0	X	3

Sheet C	1	2	3	4	5	6	7	8	9	Final
(Alberta) Brendan Bottcher 🔨	0	2	0	0	0	1	0	2	0	5
(Alberta) Kevin Koe	0	0	0	2	1	0	2	0	1	6

==== Draw 2 ====
Tuesday, April 11, 3:00 pm

Sheet A	1	2	3	4	5	6	7	8	Final
(Manitoba) Matt Dunstone 🔨	0	2	1	0	2	0	0	1	6
(Manitoba) Reid Carruthers	0	0	0	2	0	0	1	0	3

Sheet C	1	2	3	4	5	6	7	8	Final
(Sweden) Niklas Edin 🔨	2	0	3	0	5	X	X	X	10
(United States) Team Dropkin	0	3	0	1	0	X	X	X	4

==== Draw 3 ====
Tuesday, April 11, 6:30 pm

Sheet A	1	2	3	4	5	6	7	8	Final
(Switzerland) Yannick Schwaller	1	0	0	1	1	0	2	0	5
(Scotland) Ross Whyte 🔨	0	2	1	0	0	1	0	3	7

Sheet C	1	2	3	4	5	6	7	8	Final
(Newfoundland and Labrador) Brad Gushue 🔨	0	2	0	2	0	0	4	X	8
(Norway) Magnus Ramsfjell	0	0	2	0	0	1	0	X	3

==== Draw 4 ====
Wednesday, April 12, 8:00 am

Sheet B	1	2	3	4	5	6	7	8	Final
(Scotland) Bruce Mouat	0	0	2	0	0	3	0	1	6
(Manitoba) Reid Carruthers 🔨	2	1	0	1	1	0	2	0	7

Sheet D	1	2	3	4	5	6	7	8	Final
(Alberta) Brendan Bottcher 🔨	2	2	0	0	0	1	0	1	6
(United States) Team Dropkin	0	0	2	1	0	0	1	0	4

==== Draw 5 ====
Wednesday, April 12, 11:30 am

Sheet A	1	2	3	4	5	6	7	8	Final
(Newfoundland and Labrador) Brad Gushue 🔨	2	0	2	0	1	0	2	X	7
(Alberta) Kevin Koe	0	1	0	1	0	1	0	X	3

Sheet C	1	2	3	4	5	6	7	8	Final
(Italy) Joël Retornaz	0	1	0	0	2	0	0	1	4
(Switzerland) Yannick Schwaller 🔨	3	0	1	1	0	1	0	0	6

==== Draw 6 ====
Wednesday, April 12, 3:30 pm

Sheet A	1	2	3	4	5	6	7	8	Final
(United States) Team Dropkin	0	0	3	0	0	0	0	X	3
(Norway) Magnus Ramsfjell 🔨	2	0	0	1	2	2	1	X	8

Sheet C	1	2	3	4	5	6	7	8	Final
(Scotland) Ross Whyte	0	0	0	0	0	1	0	2	3
(Manitoba) Reid Carruthers 🔨	0	0	1	0	0	0	1	0	2

==== Draw 7 ====
Wednesday, April 12, 7:00 pm

Sheet B	1	2	3	4	5	6	7	8	Final
(Manitoba) Matt Dunstone 🔨	0	0	0	1	0	1	0	0	2
(Switzerland) Yannick Schwaller	0	0	1	0	3	0	1	1	6

Sheet D	1	2	3	4	5	6	7	8	Final
(Sweden) Niklas Edin	0	0	2	0	0	0	X	X	2
(Newfoundland and Labrador) Brad Gushue 🔨	0	2	0	2	2	1	X	X	7

==== Draw 8 ====
Thursday, April 13, 8:00 am

Sheet B	1	2	3	4	5	6	7	8	Final
(Alberta) Kevin Koe 🔨	0	2	0	2	0	1	2	2	9
(Norway) Magnus Ramsfjell	0	0	2	0	3	0	0	0	5

Sheet D	1	2	3	4	5	6	7	8	Final
(Italy) Joël Retornaz	1	0	2	0	0	1	1	X	5
(Scotland) Ross Whyte 🔨	0	1	0	2	0	0	0	X	3

==== Draw 9 ====
Thursday, April 13, 11:30 am

Sheet B	1	2	3	4	5	6	7	8	Final
(Sweden) Niklas Edin 🔨	2	0	0	2	2	0	2	X	8
(Alberta) Brendan Bottcher	0	2	0	0	0	1	0	X	3

Sheet C	1	2	3	4	5	6	7	8	Final
(Manitoba) Matt Dunstone 🔨	1	0	4	0	1	0	X	X	6
(Scotland) Bruce Mouat	0	0	0	1	0	0	X	X	1

==== Draw 10 ====
Thursday, April 13, 3:30 pm

Sheet B	1	2	3	4	5	6	7	8	Final
(Italy) Joël Retornaz 🔨	0	4	2	0	2	X	X	X	8
(Manitoba) Reid Carruthers	1	0	0	1	0	X	X	X	2

Sheet D	1	2	3	4	5	6	7	8	Final
(Alberta) Kevin Koe 🔨	2	0	2	1	0	1	2	X	8
(United States) Team Dropkin	0	1	0	0	1	0	0	X	2

==== Draw 11 ====
Thursday, April 13, 7:00 pm

Sheet B	1	2	3	4	5	6	7	8	9	Final
(Switzerland) Yannick Schwaller	0	0	1	1	0	2	1	0	2	7
(Scotland) Bruce Mouat 🔨	2	1	0	0	1	0	0	1	0	5

Sheet C	1	2	3	4	5	6	7	8	Final
(Newfoundland and Labrador) Brad Gushue	0	0	1	0	1	0	1	1	4
(Alberta) Brendan Bottcher 🔨	0	1	0	2	0	2	0	0	5

==== Draw 12 ====
Friday, April 14, 8:00 am

Sheet A	1	2	3	4	5	6	7	8	Final
(Sweden) Niklas Edin 🔨	2	0	0	2	0	1	0	2	7
(Norway) Magnus Ramsfjell	0	1	0	0	2	0	2	0	5

Sheet B	1	2	3	4	5	6	7	8	Final
(Manitoba) Matt Dunstone 🔨	1	0	1	0	2	0	2	1	7
(Scotland) Ross Whyte	0	2	0	1	0	2	0	0	5

==== Draw 13 ====
Friday, April 14, 11:30 am

Sheet B	1	2	3	4	5	6	7	8	Final
(Newfoundland and Labrador) Brad Gushue 🔨	3	0	1	0	1	0	4	X	9
(United States) Team Dropkin	0	1	0	1	0	1	0	X	3

Sheet D	1	2	3	4	5	6	7	8	Final
(Switzerland) Yannick Schwaller	0	0	2	2	0	0	2	1	7
(Manitoba) Reid Carruthers 🔨	1	1	0	0	2	1	0	0	5

==== Draw 14 ====
Friday, April 14, 3:30 pm

Sheet A	1	2	3	4	5	6	7	8	Final
(Manitoba) Matt Dunstone 🔨	1	0	1	0	1	0	0	0	3
(Italy) Joël Retornaz	0	2	0	1	0	0	1	1	5

Sheet C	1	2	3	4	5	6	7	8	Final
(Sweden) Niklas Edin	0	2	0	0	2	0	1	0	5
(Alberta) Kevin Koe 🔨	1	0	1	1	0	2	0	1	6

==== Draw 15 ====
Friday, April 14, 7:30 pm

Sheet A	1	2	3	4	5	6	7	8	Final
(Scotland) Bruce Mouat	0	1	0	1	0	0	2	1	5
(Scotland) Ross Whyte 🔨	1	0	1	0	3	1	0	0	6

Sheet D	1	2	3	4	5	6	7	8	Final
(Alberta) Brendan Bottcher 🔨	0	1	0	1	0	1	0	0	3
(Norway) Magnus Ramsfjell	0	0	1	0	1	0	1	1	4

=== Tiebreaker ===
Saturday, April 15, 11:30 am

Sheet C	1	2	3	4	5	6	7	8	Final
(Manitoba) Matt Dunstone	1	0	1	0	0	1	0	2	5
(Scotland) Ross Whyte 🔨	0	1	0	0	1	0	0	0	2

Player percentages
(Manitoba) Team Dunstone		(Scotland) Team Whyte	
Ryan Harnden	95%	Euan Kyle	91%
Colton Lott	89%	Duncan McFadzean	91%
B. J. Neufeld	83%	Robin Brydone	97%
Matt Dunstone	83%	Ross Whyte	83%
Total	88%	Total	90%

=== Playoffs ===
Quarterfinals
4	(Switzerland) Yannick Schwaller	6
5	(Sweden) Niklas Edin	5
3	(Alberta) Kevin Koe	5
6	(Manitoba) Matt Dunstone	3

Semifinals
1	(Italy) Joël Retornaz	3
4	(Switzerland) Yannick Schwaller	5
2	(Newfoundland and Labrador) Brad Gushue	6
3	(Alberta) Kevin Koe	7

Final
4	(Switzerland) Yannick Schwaller	4
3	(Alberta) Kevin Koe	5

==== Quarterfinals ====
Saturday, April 15, 3:30 pm

Sheet A	1	2	3	4	5	6	7	8	Final
(Switzerland) Yannick Schwaller 🔨	0	1	0	3	0	0	0	2	6
(Sweden) Niklas Edin	1	0	2	0	2	0	0	0	5

Player percentages
(Switzerland) Team Schwaller		(Sweden) Team Edin	
Pablo Lachat	95%	Christoffer Sundgren	89%
Sven Michel	83%	Rasmus Wranå	98%
Yannick Schwaller	81%	Oskar Eriksson	91%
Benoît Schwarz	77%	Niklas Edin	84%
Total	84%	Total	91%

Sheet B	1	2	3	4	5	6	7	8	Final
(Alberta) Kevin Koe 🔨	2	0	0	0	1	0	2	X	5
(Manitoba) Matt Dunstone	0	0	0	1	0	2	0	X	3

Player percentages
(Alberta) Team Koe		(Manitoba) Team Dunstone	
Karrick Martin	95%	Ryan Harnden	92%
Brad Thiessen	89%	Colton Lott	92%
Tyler Tardi	84%	B. J. Neufeld	86%
Kevin Koe	83%	Matt Dunstone	80%
Total	88%	Total	88%

==== Semifinals ====
Saturday, April 15, 7:30 pm

Sheet C	1	2	3	4	5	6	7	8	Final
(Italy) Joël Retornaz 🔨	0	0	1	0	0	0	2	X	3
(Switzerland) Yannick Schwaller	1	1	0	2	1	0	0	X	5

Player percentages
(Italy) Team Retornaz		(Switzerland) Team Schwaller	
Mattia Giovanella	92%	Pablo Lachat	92%
Sebastiano Arman	72%	Sven Michel	92%
Amos Mosaner	84%	Yannick Schwaller	88%
Joël Retornaz	77%	Benoît Schwarz	88%
Total	82%	Total	90%

Sheet D	1	2	3	4	5	6	7	8	Final
(Newfoundland and Labrador) Brad Gushue	1	0	1	0	2	0	2	0	6
(Alberta) Kevin Koe 🔨	0	1	0	2	0	1	0	3	7

Player percentages
(Newfoundland and Labrador) Team Gushue		(Alberta) Team Koe	
Geoff Walker	83%	Karrick Martin	94%
E. J. Harnden	89%	Brad Thiessen	89%
Mark Nichols	86%	Tyler Tardi	67%
Brad Gushue	91%	Kevin Koe	81%
Total	87%	Total	83%

==== Final ====
Sunday, April 16, 5:00 pm

Sheet B	1	2	3	4	5	6	7	8	Final
(Switzerland) Yannick Schwaller	0	2	0	1	0	1	0	0	4
(Alberta) Kevin Koe 🔨	1	0	0	0	1	0	0	3	5

Player percentages
(Switzerland) Team Schwaller		(Alberta) Team Koe	
Pablo Lachat	89%	Karrick Martin	89%
Sven Michel	91%	Brad Thiessen	73%
Yannick Schwaller	83%	Tyler Tardi	72%
Benoît Schwarz	95%	Kevin Koe	90%
Total	89%	Total	82%

== Women ==
=== Teams ===
The teams are listed as follows:

Skip	Third	Second	Lead	Alternate	Locale
Kerri Einarson	Val Sweeting	Shannon Birchard	Briane Harris		Gimli, Manitoba
Satsuki Fujisawa	Chinami Yoshida	Yumi Suzuki	Yurika Yoshida		Kitami, Japan
Gim Eun-ji	Kim Min-ji	Kim Su-ji	Seol Ye-eun	Seol Ye-ji	Uijeongbu, South Korea
Clancy Grandy	Kayla MacMillan	Lindsay Dubue	Sarah Loken		Vancouver, British Columbia
Anna Hasselborg	Sara McManus	Agnes Knochenhauer	Sofia Mabergs		Sundbyberg, Sweden
Rachel Homan (Fourth)	Tracy Fleury (Skip)	Emma Miskew	Rachelle Brown (Note: Rachelle Brown spared for Sarah Wilkes who was on maternity leave.)		Ottawa, Ontario
Jennifer Jones	Karlee Burgess	Mackenzie Zacharias	Emily Zacharias	Lauren Lenentine	Winnipeg, Manitoba
Kaitlyn Lawes	Laura Walker (Note: Laura Walker spared for Selena Njegovan who was on maternity leave.)	Jocelyn Peterman	Kristin MacCuish		Winnipeg, Manitoba
Tabitha Peterson	Cory Thiesse	Becca Hamilton	– (Note: Team Peterson played with three players with lead Tara Peterson absent. Coach Cathy Overton-Clapham spared for the team's second game.)	Cathy Overton-Clapham	(United States) Chaska, Minnesota
Chelsea Carey (Note: Chelsea Carey and Jamie Sinclair replaced Casey Scheidegger and Jessie Haughian.)	Kate Cameron	Jamie Sinclair	Taylor McDonald		Lethbridge, Alberta
Alina Pätz (Fourth)	Silvana Tirinzoni (Skip)	Carole Howald	Briar Schwaller-Hürlimann		Aarau, Switzerland
Isabella Wranå	Almida de Val	Maria Larsson	Linda Stenlund		Sundbyberg, Sweden

=== Round robin standings ===
Final Round Robin Standings

Key
Teams to Playoffs
Teams to Tiebreakers

Pool A	W	L	PF	PA
(Sweden) Isabella Wranå	4	1	35	23
(Japan) Satsuki Fujisawa	3	2	31	25
(Switzerland) Silvana Tirinzoni	3	2	28	28
(Ontario) Team Homan	2	3	24	28
(Manitoba) Kaitlyn Lawes	2	3	28	26
(Alberta) Team Scheidegger	1	4	19	35

Pool B	W	L	PF	PA
(South Korea) Gim Eun-ji	4	1	29	22
(United States) Tabitha Peterson	3	2	32	25
(Manitoba) Kerri Einarson	3	2	21	35
(British Columbia) Clancy Grandy	3	2	33	24
(Sweden) Anna Hasselborg	1	4	28	30
(Manitoba) Jennifer Jones	1	4	26	33

=== Round robin results ===
All draw times are listed in Eastern Time (UTC−04:00).

==== Draw 1 ====
Tuesday, April 11, 11:30 am

Sheet B	1	2	3	4	5	6	7	8	Final
(South Korea) Gim Eun-ji 🔨	2	1	0	0	0	1	1	1	6
(Manitoba) Jennifer Jones	0	0	1	3	1	0	0	0	5

Sheet D	1	2	3	4	5	6	7	8	Final
(Manitoba) Kaitlyn Lawes	4	0	0	1	1	3	X	X	9
(Alberta) Team Scheidegger 🔨	0	1	1	0	0	0	X	X	2

==== Draw 2 ====
Tuesday, April 11, 3:00 pm

Sheet B	1	2	3	4	5	6	7	8	Final
(Sweden) Anna Hasselborg 🔨	0	0	1	0	3	1	0	0	5
(British Columbia) Clancy Grandy	1	0	0	2	0	0	0	3	6

Sheet D	1	2	3	4	5	6	7	8	Final
(Switzerland) Silvana Tirinzoni	0	1	0	0	3	1	0	0	5
(Japan) Satsuki Fujisawa 🔨	2	0	2	0	0	0	3	1	8

==== Draw 3 ====
Tuesday, April 11, 6:30 pm

Sheet B	1	2	3	4	5	6	7	8	Final
(Manitoba) Kerri Einarson	0	1	0	1	0	1	0	X	3
(United States) Tabitha Peterson 🔨	2	0	1	0	3	0	2	X	8

Sheet D	1	2	3	4	5	6	7	8	Final
(Ontario) Team Homan 🔨	1	0	0	2	0	2	0	0	5
(Sweden) Isabella Wranå	0	1	1	0	3	0	1	1	7

==== Draw 4 ====
Wednesday, April 12, 8:00 am

Sheet A	1	2	3	4	5	6	7	8	Final
(Manitoba) Jennifer Jones	0	1	1	0	2	0	1	X	5
(Sweden) Anna Hasselborg 🔨	2	0	0	1	0	4	0	X	7

Sheet C	1	2	3	4	5	6	7	8	Final
(Switzerland) Silvana Tirinzoni	0	0	1	0	1	0	0	X	2
(Manitoba) Kaitlyn Lawes 🔨	0	3	0	2	0	1	1	X	7

==== Draw 5 ====
Wednesday, April 12, 11:30 am

Sheet B	1	2	3	4	5	6	7	8	Final
(Japan) Satsuki Fujisawa 🔨	1	0	0	0	2	0	1	0	4
(Sweden) Isabella Wranå	0	0	2	0	0	2	0	1	5

Sheet D	1	2	3	4	5	6	7	8	Final
(Manitoba) Kerri Einarson	0	0	0	0	0	X	X	X	0
(British Columbia) Clancy Grandy 🔨	2	4	1	1	5	X	X	X	13

==== Draw 6 ====
Wednesday, April 12, 3:30 pm

Sheet B	1	2	3	4	5	6	7	8	Final
(Ontario) Team Homan	0	0	2	0	1	1	1	1	6
(Manitoba) Kaitlyn Lawes 🔨	1	1	0	2	0	0	0	0	4

Sheet D	1	2	3	4	5	6	7	8	Final
(Manitoba) Jennifer Jones	0	2	0	4	1	2	0	X	9
(United States) Tabitha Peterson 🔨	2	0	2	0	0	0	2	X	6

==== Draw 7 ====
Wednesday, April 12, 7:00 pm

Sheet A	1	2	3	4	5	6	7	8	Final
(Sweden) Isabella Wranå 🔨	0	1	2	1	0	1	1	X	6
(Alberta) Team Scheidegger	0	0	0	0	2	0	0	X	2

Sheet C	1	2	3	4	5	6	7	8	Final
(Manitoba) Kerri Einarson 🔨	2	0	1	0	1	0	2	0	6
(South Korea) Gim Eun-ji	0	2	0	1	0	1	0	1	5

==== Draw 8 ====
Thursday, April 13, 8:00 am

Sheet A	1	2	3	4	5	6	7	8	Final
(Ontario) Team Homan 🔨	1	0	3	0	0	1	1	1	7
(Japan) Satsuki Fujisawa	0	1	0	2	1	0	0	0	4

Sheet C	1	2	3	4	5	6	7	8	Final
(British Columbia) Clancy Grandy 🔨	0	0	0	0	1	1	0	X	2
(United States) Tabitha Peterson	1	1	1	1	0	0	5	X	9

==== Draw 9 ====
Thursday, April 13, 11:30 am

Sheet A	1	2	3	4	5	6	7	8	9	Final
(Switzerland) Silvana Tirinzoni	0	4	0	1	0	1	0	1	1	8
(Sweden) Isabella Wranå 🔨	1	0	3	0	1	0	2	0	0	7

Sheet D	1	2	3	4	5	6	7	8	Final
(South Korea) Gim Eun-ji 🔨	2	0	0	0	2	1	0	1	6
(Sweden) Anna Hasselborg	0	0	2	1	0	0	2	0	5

==== Draw 10 ====
Thursday, April 13, 3:30 pm

Sheet A	1	2	3	4	5	6	7	8	Final
(Manitoba) Jennifer Jones	0	0	1	0	0	2	0	X	3
(British Columbia) Clancy Grandy 🔨	0	4	0	1	1	0	2	X	8

Sheet C	1	2	3	4	5	6	7	8	9	Final
(Manitoba) Kaitlyn Lawes 🔨	1	0	0	1	0	0	1	1	0	4
(Japan) Satsuki Fujisawa	0	1	1	0	1	1	0	0	2	6

==== Draw 11 ====
Thursday, April 13, 7:00 pm

Sheet A	1	2	3	4	5	6	7	8	Final
(Manitoba) Kerri Einarson	0	1	0	1	0	0	2	2	6
(Sweden) Anna Hasselborg 🔨	1	0	1	0	2	1	0	0	5

Sheet D	1	2	3	4	5	6	7	8	9	Final
(Switzerland) Silvana Tirinzoni 🔨	2	0	0	0	2	0	1	0	1	6
(Alberta) Team Scheidegger	0	0	2	0	0	2	0	1	0	5

==== Draw 12 ====
Friday, April 14, 8:00 am

Sheet C	1	2	3	4	5	6	7	8	Final
(South Korea) Gim Eun-ji	1	1	0	0	0	0	2	1	5
(United States) Tabitha Peterson 🔨	0	0	0	1	0	1	0	0	2

Sheet D	1	2	3	4	5	6	7	8	Final
(Manitoba) Kaitlyn Lawes	0	2	0	1	0	1	0	X	4
(Sweden) Isabella Wranå 🔨	2	0	2	0	5	0	1	X	10

==== Draw 13 ====
Friday, April 14, 11:30 am

Sheet A	1	2	3	4	5	6	7	8	Final
(Ontario) Team Homan	0	2	0	2	0	0	1	0	5
(Alberta) Team Scheidegger 🔨	2	0	1	0	1	1	0	1	6

Sheet C	1	2	3	4	5	6	7	8	Final
(Manitoba) Kerri Einarson 🔨	0	3	0	0	1	0	0	2	6
(Manitoba) Jennifer Jones	0	0	1	1	0	1	1	0	4

==== Draw 14 ====
Friday, April 14, 3:30 pm

Sheet B	1	2	3	4	5	6	7	8	Final
(South Korea) Gim Eun-ji	0	1	0	1	2	1	0	2	7
(British Columbia) Clancy Grandy 🔨	1	0	2	0	0	0	1	0	4

Sheet D	1	2	3	4	5	6	7	8	9	Final
(Sweden) Anna Hasselborg	3	0	0	1	0	1	0	1	0	6
(United States) Tabitha Peterson 🔨	0	1	0	0	2	0	3	0	1	7

==== Draw 15 ====
Friday, April 14, 7:30 pm

Sheet B	1	2	3	4	5	6	7	8	Final
(Switzerland) Silvana Tirinzoni 🔨	0	1	3	1	0	2	X	X	7
(Ontario) Team Homan	0	0	0	0	1	0	X	X	1

Sheet C	1	2	3	4	5	6	7	8	Final
(Japan) Satsuki Fujisawa 🔨	3	2	0	0	2	0	2	X	9
(Alberta) Team Scheidegger	0	0	2	1	0	1	0	X	4

=== Tiebreaker ===
Saturday, April 15, 11:30 am

Sheet A	1	2	3	4	5	6	7	8	Final
(British Columbia) Clancy Grandy	0	0	1	0	1	0	X	X	2
(Switzerland) Silvana Tirinzoni 🔨	1	3	0	2	0	1	X	X	7

Player percentages
(British Columbia) Team Grandy		(Switzerland) Team Tirinzoni	
Sarah Loken	71%	Briar Schwaller-Hürlimann	71%
Lindsay Dubue	85%	Carole Howald	88%
Kayla MacMillan	69%	Silvana Tirinzoni	85%
Clancy Grandy	60%	Alina Pätz	85%
Total	71%	Total	82%

=== Playoffs ===
Quarterfinals
4	(Manitoba) Kerri Einarson	6
5	(Japan) Satsuki Fujisawa	5
3	(United States) Tabitha Peterson	5
6	(Switzerland) Silvana Tirinzoni	7

Semifinals
1	(South Korea) Gim Eun-ji	4
6	(Switzerland) Silvana Tirinzoni	6
2	(Sweden) Isabella Wranå	10
4	(Manitoba) Kerri Einarson	3

Final
6	(Switzerland) Silvana Tirinzoni	5
2	(Sweden) Isabella Wranå	6

==== Quarterfinals ====
Saturday, April 15, 3:30 pm

Sheet C	1	2	3	4	5	6	7	8	Final
(United States) Tabitha Peterson	0	2	0	1	1	0	1	X	5
(Switzerland) Silvana Tirinzoni 🔨	5	0	1	0	0	1	0	X	7

Player percentages
(United States) Team Peterson		(Switzerland) Team Tirinzoni	
–		Briar Schwaller-Hürlimann	70%
Becca Hamilton	69%	Carole Howald	92%
Cory Thiesse	78%	Silvana Tirinzoni	91%
Tabitha Peterson	75%	Alina Pätz	72%
Total	74%	Total	81%

Sheet D	1	2	3	4	5	6	7	8	9	Final
(Manitoba) Kerri Einarson 🔨	1	0	1	0	3	0	0	0	1	6
(Japan) Satsuki Fujisawa	0	1	0	2	0	0	1	1	0	5

Player percentages
(Manitoba) Team Einarson		(Japan) Team Fujisawa	
Briane Harris	89%	Yurika Yoshida	88%
Shannon Birchard	94%	Yumi Suzuki	83%
Val Sweeting	74%	Chinami Yoshida	67%
Kerri Einarson	82%	Satsuki Fujisawa	75%
Total	85%	Total	78%

==== Semifinals ====
Saturday, April 15, 7:30 pm

Sheet A	1	2	3	4	5	6	7	8	Final
(Sweden) Isabella Wranå 🔨	3	4	0	3	0	X	X	X	10
(Manitoba) Kerri Einarson	0	0	2	0	1	X	X	X	3

Player percentages
(Sweden) Team Wranå		(Manitoba) Team Einarson	
Linda Stenlund	93%	Briane Harris	85%
Maria Larsson	85%	Shannon Birchard	75%
Almida de Val	90%	Val Sweeting	63%
Isabella Wranå	95%	Kerri Einarson	78%
Total	91%	Total	75%

Sheet B	1	2	3	4	5	6	7	8	Final
(South Korea) Gim Eun-ji 🔨	0	0	2	0	0	1	0	1	4
(Switzerland) Silvana Tirinzoni	1	0	0	1	2	0	2	0	6

Player percentages
(South Korea) Team Gim		(Switzerland) Team Tirinzoni	
Seol Ye-eun	84%	Briar Schwaller-Hürlimann	94%
Kim Su-ji	91%	Carole Howald	86%
Kim Min-ji	83%	Silvana Tirinzoni	80%
Gim Eun-ji	82%	Alina Pätz	97%
Total	85%	Total	89%

==== Final ====
Sunday, April 16, 1:00 pm

Sheet B	1	2	3	4	5	6	7	8	Final
(Switzerland) Silvana Tirinzoni	0	1	0	0	1	0	2	1	5
(Sweden) Isabella Wranå 🔨	1	0	0	3	0	2	0	0	6

Player percentages
(Switzerland) Team Tirinzoni		(Sweden) Team Wranå	
Briar Schwaller-Hürlimann	89%	Linda Stenlund	83%
Carole Howald	78%	Maria Larsson	72%
Silvana Tirinzoni	84%	Almida de Val	73%
Alina Pätz	81%	Isabella Wranå	88%
Total	83%	Total	79%
