= 2023 Scotties Tournament of Hearts =

Canada's women's curling championship

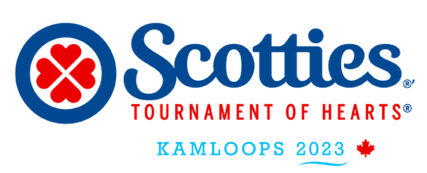
- Host city: Kamloops, British Columbia
- Arena: Sandman Centre
- Dates: February 17–26
- Attendance: 51,255
- Winner: Canada
- Curling club: Gimli CC, Gimli, Manitoba
- Skip: Kerri Einarson
- Third: Val Sweeting
- Second: Shannon Birchard
- Lead: Briane Harris
- Alternate: Krysten Karwacki
- Coach: Reid Carruthers
- Finalist: Manitoba (Jennifer Jones)

The 2023 Scotties Tournament of Hearts, Canada's national women's curling championship, was held from February 17 to 26 at the Sandman Centre in Kamloops, British Columbia. The winning Kerri Einarson team represented Canada at the 2023 World Women's Curling Championship at the Göransson Arena in Sandviken, Sweden.

The defending champion Kerri Einarson rink, representing Team Canada, defeated Team Manitoba, skipped by Jennifer Jones in the final, 10–4. It was the fourth straight championship for the Einarson team, becoming only the second team ever to win four straight Tournament of Hearts (Colleen Jones' rink won from 2001 to 2004 inclusively). In the final, Team Canada broke a 2–2 tie in the fifth, when they stole two points after Jones' final draw came up light. Manitoba conceded the game after Einarson hit for five in the ninth end.

Skip Kerri Einarson and her team of Val Sweeting, Shannon Birchard and Briane Harris had won the past three editions and are representing Team Canada at the event. The event follows the same format as the past two editions that includes Team Canada, the fourteen Canadian curling member associations and three Wild Card teams that are the top three teams who did not qualify from their provincial playdowns based on CTRS standings.

== Teams ==
The fourteen Canadian curling member associations held playdowns to determine who would represent their province or territory. Team Canada is represented by Team Kerri Einarson, who were the winners of the 2022 Scotties Tournament of Hearts. The three wild card teams were decided by the CTRS standings. The top three teams, who did not already qualify from their playdowns, qualified.

The teams are listed as follows:

| Canada | Alberta | British Columbia |
|---|---|---|
| Gimli CC, Gimli Skip: Kerri Einarson; Third: Val Sweeting; Second: Shannon Birchard; Lead: Briane Harris (Note: Team Canada's alternate Krysten Karwacki threw lead stones for the last end of Draw 8 and the last two ends of Draw 11.); Alternate: Krysten Karwacki | Garrison CC, Calgary Skip: Kayla Skrlik; Third: Brittany Tran; Second: Geri-Lynn Ramsay (Note: Team Alberta's alternate Crystal Webster threw second stones for the last two ends of Draw 9.); Lead: Ashton Skrlik; Alternate: Crystal Webster | Vancouver CC, Vancouver Skip: Clancy Grandy; Third: Kayla MacMillan; Second: Lindsay Dubue; Lead: Sarah Loken; Alternate: Katie Witt |
| Manitoba | New Brunswick | Newfoundland and Labrador |
| St. Vital CC, Winnipeg & Altona CC, Altona Skip: Jennifer Jones; Third: Karlee Burgess; Second: Mackenzie Zacharias; Lead: Emily Zacharias (Note: Team Manitoba rotated leads throughout the tournament.); Alternate: Lauren Lenentine | Capital WC, Fredericton Skip: Andrea Kelly; Third: Sylvie Quillian; Second: Jill Brothers; Lead: Katie Forward; Alternate: Heather Smith | RE/MAX Centre, St. John's Skip: Stacie Curtis; Third: Erica Curtis; Second: Julie Hynes; Lead: Camille Burt |
| Northern Ontario | Nova Scotia | Ontario |
| Fort William CC, Thunder Bay Skip: Krista McCarville; Third: Kendra Lilly; Second: Ashley Sippala; Lead: Sarah Potts | Dartmouth CC, Dartmouth Skip: Christina Black; Third: Jenn Baxter; Second: Karlee Everist; Lead: Shelley Barker; Alternate: Carole MacLean | Ottawa CC, Ottawa Fourth: Rachel Homan; Skip: Tracy Fleury; Second: Emma Miskew; Lead: Sarah Wilkes (Note: Team Ontario's alternate Kira Brunton threw lead stones for Draw 9, Draw 17 and the last two ends of Draw 2.); Alternate: Kira Brunton |
| Prince Edward Island | Quebec | Saskatchewan |
| Cornwall CC, Cornwall Fourth: Suzanne Birt; Skip: Marie Christianson; Second: Michelle Shea (Note: For the last end of Draw 8, Team Prince Edward Island's alternate Sinead Dolan threw lead stones, lead Meaghan Hughes threw second stones and second Michelle Shea sat out.); Lead: Meaghan Hughes; Alternate: Sinead Dolan | CC Laval-sur-le-Lac, Laval & Glenmore CC, Dollard-des-Ormeaux Skip: Laurie St-Georges; Third: Emily Riley; Second: Alanna Routledge (Note: Team Quebec's alternate Émilie Desjardins threw second stones for the last three ends of Draw 9.); Lead: Kelly Middaugh; Alternate: Émilie Desjardins | Twin Rivers CC, North Battleford Skip: Robyn Silvernagle; Third: Kelly Schafer; Second: Sherry Just; Lead: Kara Thevenot (Note: Team Saskatchewan's alternate Skylar Ackerman threw lead stones for the last three ends of Draw 11.); Alternate: Skylar Ackerman |
| Northwest Territories | Nunavut | Yukon |
| Yellowknife CC, Yellowknife Fourth: Jo-Ann Rizzo; Third: Margot Flemming; Second: Sarah Koltun; Skip: Kerry Galusha; Alternate: Megan Koehler | Iqaluit CC, Iqaluit Skip: Brigitte MacPhail; Third: Sadie Pinksen; Second: Kaitlin MacDonald; Lead: Alison Taylor (Note: Team Nunavut's alternate Leigh Gustafson threw lead stones for the first five ends of Draw 15 and the last three ends of Draw 18.); Alternate: Leigh Gustafson | Whitehorse CC, Whitehorse Skip: Hailey Birnie; Third: Chelsea Jarvis (Note: Team Yukon's alternate Jenna Duncan threw third stones for Draw 8, Draw 16 and the last six ends of Draw 6.); Second: Kerry Campbell; Lead: Kimberly Tuor; Alternate: Jenna Duncan |
| (Manitoba) Wild Card #1 | (Alberta) Wild Card #2 | (Manitoba) Wild Card #3 |
| Fort Rouge CC, Winnipeg Skip: Kaitlyn Lawes; Third: Laura Walker (Note: Laura Walker threw third stones for Team Wild Card #1's regular third Selena Njegovan who was on maternity leave.) (Note: Team Wild Card #1's second Jocelyn Peterman removed herself from the game after six ends during Draw 15. This meant that for the remaining two ends, lead Kristin MacCuish and third Laura Walker threw three rocks each.); Second: Jocelyn Peterman; Lead: Kristin MacCuish; Parental Leave: Selena Njegovan | Lethbridge CC, Lethbridge Skip: Casey Scheidegger; Third: Kate Cameron; Second: Jessie Haughian (Note: Team Wild Card #2's alternate Kristie Moore threw second stones for the last two ends of Draw 2 and the last three ends of Draw 8.); Lead: Taylor McDonald; Alternate: Kristie Moore | East St. Paul CC, East St. Paul Skip: Meghan Walter; Third: Abby Ackland; Second: Sara Oliver; Lead: Mackenzie Elias |

=== CTRS Rankings ===
As of February 14, 2023

| Member Association (Skip) | Rank | Points |
|---|---|---|
| Canada (Einarson) | 1 | 306.000 |
| Ontario (Fleury) | 2 | 300.750 |
| Manitoba (Jones) | 3 | 232.250 |
| (Manitoba) Wild Card #1 (Lawes) | 4 | 204.500 |
| British Columbia (Grandy) | 5 | 190.375 |
| (Alberta) Wild Card #2 (Scheidegger) | 6 | 178.250 |
| (Manitoba) Wild Card #3 (Walter) | 7 | 166.000 |
| Nova Scotia (Black) | 9 | 127.250 |
| Alberta (Skrlik) | 10 | 111.750 |
| New Brunswick (Kelly) | 14 | 94.750 |
| Northwest Territories (Galusha) | 19 | 80.500 |
| Prince Edward Island (Christianson) | 26 | 56.750 |
| Saskatchewan (Silvernagle) | 49 | 33.500 |
| Newfoundland and Labrador (Curtis) | 60 | 26.375 |
| Northern Ontario (McCarville) | 61 | 25.875 |
| Quebec (St-Georges) | 82 | 12.938 |
| Nunavut (MacPhail) | 117 | 2.625 |
| Yukon (Birnie) | NR | 0.000 |

== Map of teams ==
Team Canada Pre-Qualified Teams Provincial Winners Wild-Card Teams

== Wild card selection ==
In previous years, a wild card game was played between the top two teams on the Canadian Team Ranking System standings who did not win their provincial championship; the winner of this game was usually granted the final spot in the tournament. However, Curling Canada opted to include three wild card teams instead of the usual one. These teams will directly qualify and will not participate in a play-in game. This is the third time this format is being used, with the first two being in 2021 and 2022.

CTRS standings for Wild Card selection
| Rank | Team | Member Association | Eligibility |
|---|---|---|---|
| 1 | ~~Kerri Einarson~~ | Manitoba | Qualified as Team Canada (ineligible) |
| 2 | ~~Rachel Homan~~ | Ontario | Won Ontario provincials |
| 3 | ~~Jennifer Jones~~ | Manitoba | Won Manitoba provincials |
| 4 | Kaitlyn Lawes | Manitoba | Eliminated from provincials |
| 5 | ~~Clancy Grandy~~ | British Columbia | Won British Columbia provincials |
| 6 | Casey Scheidegger | Alberta | Eliminated from provincials |
| 7 | Meghan Walter | Manitoba | Eliminated from provincials |

== Round robin standings ==
Final Round Robin Standings

Key
| Teams to Championship Round |
| Teams to Tiebreakers |

| Pool A | Skip | W | L | PF | PA | EW | EL | BE | SE | S% | LSD |
|---|---|---|---|---|---|---|---|---|---|---|---|
| Canada | Kerri Einarson | 8 | 0 | 78 | 41 | 38 | 30 | 2 | 10 | 86% | 393.9 |
| Nova Scotia | Christina Black | 5 | 3 | 59 | 46 | 36 | 29 | 5 | 11 | 78% | 362.4 |
| Quebec | Laurie St-Georges | 5 | 3 | 66 | 57 | 33 | 31 | 6 | 7 | 79% | 732.1 |
| British Columbia | Clancy Grandy | 5 | 3 | 60 | 53 | 36 | 31 | 2 | 11 | 80% | 320.5 |
| (Manitoba) Wild Card #1 | Kaitlyn Lawes | 5 | 3 | 63 | 49 | 37 | 29 | 8 | 11 | 82% | 323.6 |
| Alberta | Kayla Skrlik | 4 | 4 | 66 | 55 | 32 | 34 | 4 | 7 | 82% | 649.2 |
| Prince Edward Island | Marie Christianson | 2 | 6 | 46 | 65 | 33 | 33 | 3 | 8 | 74% | 651.2 |
| Saskatchewan | Robyn Silvernagle | 2 | 6 | 54 | 70 | 27 | 38 | 3 | 3 | 79% | 764.7 |
| Nunavut | Brigitte MacPhail | 0 | 8 | 31 | 87 | 21 | 38 | 4 | 2 | 68% | 1232.6 |

| Pool B | Skip | W | L | PF | PA | EW | EL | BE | SE | S% | LSD |
|---|---|---|---|---|---|---|---|---|---|---|---|
| Northern Ontario | Krista McCarville | 7 | 1 | 64 | 46 | 40 | 32 | 3 | 13 | 82% | 453.9 |
| Manitoba | Jennifer Jones | 7 | 1 | 68 | 48 | 42 | 28 | 3 | 15 | 82% | 278.6 |
| Ontario | Tracy Fleury | 6 | 2 | 63 | 43 | 31 | 31 | 8 | 5 | 84% | 308.6 |
| Northwest Territories | Kerry Galusha | 4 | 4 | 61 | 52 | 39 | 31 | 1 | 13 | 80% | 704.3 |
| (Manitoba) Wild Card #3 | Meghan Walter | 3 | 5 | 53 | 57 | 33 | 34 | 4 | 8 | 76% | 447.0 |
| (Alberta) Wild Card #2 | Casey Scheidegger | 3 | 5 | 50 | 56 | 33 | 36 | 4 | 8 | 80% | 469.4 |
| New Brunswick | Andrea Kelly | 3 | 5 | 52 | 51 | 35 | 36 | 1 | 9 | 81% | 668.7 |
| Newfoundland and Labrador | Stacie Curtis | 2 | 6 | 55 | 74 | 32 | 39 | 0 | 8 | 78% | 661.1 |
| Yukon | Hailey Birnie | 1 | 7 | 40 | 79 | 25 | 43 | 0 | 2 | 71% | 690.0 |

Pool A Round Robin Summary Table
| Pos. | Team | (Alberta) AB | (British Columbia) BC | (Canada) CAN | (Nova Scotia) NS | (Nunavut) NU | (Prince Edward Island) PE | (Quebec) QC | (Saskatchewan) SK | (Manitoba) WC1 | Record |
|---|---|---|---|---|---|---|---|---|---|---|---|
| 6 | Alberta | — | 6–8 | 8–9 | 7–4 | 9–4 | 10–7 | 12–4 | 9–11 | 5–8 | 4–4 |
| 4 | British Columbia | 8–6 | — | 4–9 | 2–8 | 12–4 | 10–6 | 6–9 | 11–6 | 7–5 | 5–3 |
| 1 | Canada | 9–8 | 9–4 | — | 9–4 | 11–3 | 9–2 | 11–8 | 10–3 | 10–9 | 8–0 |
| 2 | Nova Scotia | 4–7 | 8–2 | 4–9 | — | 9–5 | 10–4 | 7–6 | 12–7 | 5–6 | 5–3 |
| 9 | Nunavut | 4–9 | 4–12 | 3–11 | 5–9 | — | 2–10 | 5–13 | 4–13 | 4–10 | 0–8 |
| 7 | Prince Edward Island | 7–10 | 6–10 | 2–9 | 4–10 | 10–2 | — | 4–8 | 7–6 | 6–10 | 2–6 |
| 3 | Quebec | 4–12 | 9–6 | 8–11 | 6–7 | 13–5 | 8–4 | — | 9–5 | 9–7 | 5–3 |
| 8 | Saskatchewan | 11–9 | 6–11 | 3–10 | 7–12 | 13–4 | 6–7 | 5–9 | — | 3–8 | 2–6 |
| 5 | (Manitoba) Wild Card #1 | 8–5 | 5–7 | 9–10 | 6–5 | 10–4 | 10–6 | 7–9 | 8–3 | — | 5–3 |

Pool B Round Robin Summary Table
| Pos. | Team | (Manitoba) MB | (New Brunswick) NB | (Newfoundland and Labrador) NL | (Northern Ontario) NO | (Northwest Territories) NT | (Ontario) ON | (Alberta) WC2 | (Manitoba) WC3 | (Yukon) YT | Record |
|---|---|---|---|---|---|---|---|---|---|---|---|
| 2 | Manitoba | — | 8–5 | 7–4 | 8–11 | 10–8 | 6–4 | 7–6 | 12–5 | 10–5 | 7–1 |
| 7 | New Brunswick | 5–8 | — | 8–7 | 6–8 | 4–6 | 3–5 | 7–6 | 5–8 | 14–3 | 3–5 |
| 8 | Newfoundland and Labrador | 4–7 | 7–8 | — | 7–8 | 8–14 | 3–12 | 5–12 | 10–9 | 11–4 | 2–6 |
| 1 | Northern Ontario | 11–8 | 8–6 | 8–7 | — | 5–4 | 5–7 | 9–6 | 8–6 | 10–2 | 7–1 |
| 4 | Northwest Territories | 8–10 | 6–4 | 14–8 | 4–5 | — | 8–4 | 6–7 | 6–8 | 9–6 | 4–4 |
| 3 | Ontario | 4–6 | 5–3 | 12–3 | 7–5 | 4–8 | — | 9–5 | 9–5 | 13–8 | 6–2 |
| 6 | (Alberta) Wild Card #2 | 6–7 | 6–7 | 12–5 | 6–9 | 7–6 | 5–9 | — | 5–3 | 3–10 | 3–5 |
| 5 | (Manitoba) Wild Card #3 | 5–12 | 8–5 | 9–10 | 6–8 | 8–6 | 5–9 | 3–5 | — | 9–2 | 3–5 |
| 9 | Yukon | 5–10 | 3–14 | 4–11 | 2–10 | 6–9 | 8–13 | 10–3 | 2–9 | — | 1–7 |

== Round robin results ==
All draw times are listed in Pacific Time (UTC−08:00).

=== Draw 1 ===
Friday, February 17, 6:00 pm

| Sheet A | 1 | 2 | 3 | 4 | 5 | 6 | 7 | 8 | 9 | 10 | Final |
|---|---|---|---|---|---|---|---|---|---|---|---|
| Saskatchewan (Silvernagle) | 0 | 0 | 3 | 0 | 0 | 2 | 0 | 2 | 0 | 0 | 7 |
| Nova Scotia (Black) 🔨 | 1 | 1 | 0 | 1 | 1 | 0 | 4 | 0 | 3 | 1 | 12 |

| Sheet B | 1 | 2 | 3 | 4 | 5 | 6 | 7 | 8 | 9 | 10 | Final |
|---|---|---|---|---|---|---|---|---|---|---|---|
| (Manitoba) Wild Card #1 (Lawes) | 0 | 0 | 0 | 0 | 2 | 0 | 1 | 1 | 2 | 2 | 8 |
| Alberta (Skrlik) 🔨 | 1 | 0 | 0 | 0 | 0 | 4 | 0 | 0 | 0 | 0 | 5 |

| Sheet C | 1 | 2 | 3 | 4 | 5 | 6 | 7 | 8 | 9 | 10 | Final |
|---|---|---|---|---|---|---|---|---|---|---|---|
| Canada (Einarson) 🔨 | 3 | 0 | 2 | 0 | 0 | 2 | 0 | 4 | 0 | X | 11 |
| Quebec (St-Georges) | 0 | 2 | 0 | 3 | 0 | 0 | 2 | 0 | 1 | X | 8 |

| Sheet D | 1 | 2 | 3 | 4 | 5 | 6 | 7 | 8 | 9 | 10 | Final |
|---|---|---|---|---|---|---|---|---|---|---|---|
| British Columbia (Grandy) 🔨 | 2 | 0 | 1 | 0 | 2 | 2 | 0 | 2 | 0 | 1 | 10 |
| Prince Edward Island (Christianson) | 0 | 2 | 0 | 2 | 0 | 0 | 2 | 0 | 0 | 0 | 6 |

=== Draw 2 ===
Saturday, February 18, 1:00 pm

| Sheet A | 1 | 2 | 3 | 4 | 5 | 6 | 7 | 8 | 9 | 10 | Final |
|---|---|---|---|---|---|---|---|---|---|---|---|
| Northern Ontario (McCarville) | 0 | 2 | 0 | 1 | 2 | 0 | 3 | 1 | 0 | 2 | 11 |
| Manitoba (Jones) 🔨 | 2 | 0 | 2 | 0 | 0 | 3 | 0 | 0 | 1 | 0 | 8 |

| Sheet B | 1 | 2 | 3 | 4 | 5 | 6 | 7 | 8 | 9 | 10 | Final |
|---|---|---|---|---|---|---|---|---|---|---|---|
| (Manitoba) Wild Card #3 (Walter) | 0 | 0 | 0 | 0 | 0 | 1 | 0 | 1 | 1 | X | 3 |
| (Alberta) Wild Card #2 (Scheidegger) 🔨 | 1 | 0 | 0 | 1 | 1 | 0 | 2 | 0 | 0 | X | 5 |

| Sheet C | 1 | 2 | 3 | 4 | 5 | 6 | 7 | 8 | 9 | 10 | Final |
|---|---|---|---|---|---|---|---|---|---|---|---|
| Northwest Territories (Galusha) 🔨 | 0 | 0 | 2 | 1 | 0 | 1 | 0 | 1 | 0 | 1 | 6 |
| New Brunswick (Kelly) | 1 | 0 | 0 | 0 | 1 | 0 | 1 | 0 | 1 | 0 | 4 |

| Sheet D | 1 | 2 | 3 | 4 | 5 | 6 | 7 | 8 | 9 | 10 | Final |
|---|---|---|---|---|---|---|---|---|---|---|---|
| Ontario (Fleury) 🔨 | 3 | 0 | 1 | 0 | 2 | 0 | 3 | 3 | X | X | 12 |
| Newfoundland and Labrador (Curtis) | 0 | 1 | 0 | 1 | 0 | 1 | 0 | 0 | X | X | 3 |

=== Draw 3 ===
Saturday, February 18, 6:00 pm

| Sheet A | 1 | 2 | 3 | 4 | 5 | 6 | 7 | 8 | 9 | 10 | Final |
|---|---|---|---|---|---|---|---|---|---|---|---|
| Prince Edward Island (Christianson) 🔨 | 2 | 0 | 3 | 2 | 1 | 0 | 1 | 1 | X | X | 10 |
| Nunavut (MacPhail) | 0 | 1 | 0 | 0 | 0 | 1 | 0 | 0 | X | X | 2 |

| Sheet B | 1 | 2 | 3 | 4 | 5 | 6 | 7 | 8 | 9 | 10 | Final |
|---|---|---|---|---|---|---|---|---|---|---|---|
| Canada (Einarson) | 0 | 4 | 0 | 1 | 0 | 0 | 1 | 1 | 2 | X | 9 |
| British Columbia (Grandy) 🔨 | 1 | 0 | 1 | 0 | 1 | 1 | 0 | 0 | 0 | X | 4 |

| Sheet C | 1 | 2 | 3 | 4 | 5 | 6 | 7 | 8 | 9 | 10 | Final |
|---|---|---|---|---|---|---|---|---|---|---|---|
| (Manitoba) Wild Card #1 (Lawes) 🔨 | 1 | 0 | 1 | 0 | 2 | 0 | 0 | 1 | 1 | 0 | 6 |
| Nova Scotia (Black) | 0 | 2 | 0 | 1 | 0 | 1 | 0 | 0 | 0 | 1 | 5 |

| Sheet D | 1 | 2 | 3 | 4 | 5 | 6 | 7 | 8 | 9 | 10 | 11 | Final |
|---|---|---|---|---|---|---|---|---|---|---|---|---|
| Alberta (Skrlik) 🔨 | 1 | 0 | 4 | 0 | 0 | 0 | 0 | 1 | 0 | 3 | 0 | 9 |
| Saskatchewan (Silvernagle) | 0 | 1 | 0 | 2 | 0 | 1 | 1 | 0 | 4 | 0 | 2 | 11 |

=== Draw 4 ===
Sunday, February 19, 8:30 am

| Sheet A | 1 | 2 | 3 | 4 | 5 | 6 | 7 | 8 | 9 | 10 | Final |
|---|---|---|---|---|---|---|---|---|---|---|---|
| Newfoundland and Labrador (Curtis) | 0 | 1 | 2 | 1 | 2 | 0 | 2 | 3 | X | X | 11 |
| Yukon (Birnie) 🔨 | 1 | 0 | 0 | 0 | 0 | 3 | 0 | 0 | X | X | 4 |

| Sheet B | 1 | 2 | 3 | 4 | 5 | 6 | 7 | 8 | 9 | 10 | Final |
|---|---|---|---|---|---|---|---|---|---|---|---|
| Northwest Territories (Galusha) 🔨 | 2 | 2 | 0 | 1 | 0 | 2 | 0 | 1 | 0 | X | 8 |
| Ontario (Fleury) | 0 | 0 | 1 | 0 | 2 | 0 | 0 | 0 | 1 | X | 4 |

| Sheet C | 1 | 2 | 3 | 4 | 5 | 6 | 7 | 8 | 9 | 10 | Final |
|---|---|---|---|---|---|---|---|---|---|---|---|
| (Manitoba) Wild Card #3 (Walter) | 0 | 0 | 0 | 4 | 0 | 1 | 0 | 0 | X | X | 5 |
| Manitoba (Jones) 🔨 | 3 | 4 | 1 | 0 | 2 | 0 | 1 | 1 | X | X | 12 |

| Sheet D | 1 | 2 | 3 | 4 | 5 | 6 | 7 | 8 | 9 | 10 | Final |
|---|---|---|---|---|---|---|---|---|---|---|---|
| (Alberta) Wild Card #2 (Scheidegger) | 0 | 1 | 0 | 0 | 2 | 0 | 2 | 0 | 0 | 1 | 6 |
| Northern Ontario (McCarville) 🔨 | 2 | 0 | 1 | 1 | 0 | 2 | 0 | 2 | 1 | 0 | 9 |

=== Draw 5 ===
Sunday, February 19, 1:30 pm

| Sheet A | 1 | 2 | 3 | 4 | 5 | 6 | 7 | 8 | 9 | 10 | 11 | Final |
|---|---|---|---|---|---|---|---|---|---|---|---|---|
| (Manitoba) Wild Card #1 (Lawes) 🔨 | 2 | 0 | 2 | 1 | 0 | 1 | 0 | 2 | 0 | 1 | 0 | 9 |
| Canada (Einarson) | 0 | 2 | 0 | 0 | 3 | 0 | 2 | 0 | 2 | 0 | 1 | 10 |

| Sheet B | 1 | 2 | 3 | 4 | 5 | 6 | 7 | 8 | 9 | 10 | Final |
|---|---|---|---|---|---|---|---|---|---|---|---|
| Nova Scotia (Black) 🔨 | 0 | 0 | 3 | 0 | 1 | 0 | 3 | 0 | 3 | X | 10 |
| Prince Edward Island (Christianson) | 0 | 1 | 0 | 1 | 0 | 1 | 0 | 1 | 0 | X | 4 |

| Sheet C | 1 | 2 | 3 | 4 | 5 | 6 | 7 | 8 | 9 | 10 | Final |
|---|---|---|---|---|---|---|---|---|---|---|---|
| British Columbia (Grandy) 🔨 | 0 | 4 | 0 | 1 | 0 | 1 | 0 | 4 | 1 | X | 11 |
| Saskatchewan (Silvernagle) | 0 | 0 | 2 | 0 | 2 | 0 | 2 | 0 | 0 | X | 6 |

| Sheet D | 1 | 2 | 3 | 4 | 5 | 6 | 7 | 8 | 9 | 10 | Final |
|---|---|---|---|---|---|---|---|---|---|---|---|
| Quebec (St-Georges) | 0 | 0 | 3 | 2 | 0 | 0 | 4 | 1 | 3 | X | 13 |
| Nunavut (MacPhail) 🔨 | 2 | 0 | 0 | 0 | 2 | 1 | 0 | 0 | 0 | X | 5 |

=== Draw 6 ===
Sunday, February 19, 6:30 pm

| Sheet A | 1 | 2 | 3 | 4 | 5 | 6 | 7 | 8 | 9 | 10 | Final |
|---|---|---|---|---|---|---|---|---|---|---|---|
| (Manitoba) Wild Card #3 (Walter) 🔨 | 1 | 0 | 2 | 0 | 1 | 0 | 4 | 0 | 0 | X | 8 |
| Northwest Territories (Galusha) | 0 | 1 | 0 | 1 | 0 | 2 | 0 | 1 | 1 | X | 6 |

| Sheet B | 1 | 2 | 3 | 4 | 5 | 6 | 7 | 8 | 9 | 10 | Final |
|---|---|---|---|---|---|---|---|---|---|---|---|
| Manitoba (Jones) 🔨 | 0 | 2 | 1 | 0 | 1 | 0 | 1 | 0 | 2 | X | 7 |
| Newfoundland and Labrador (Curtis) | 0 | 0 | 0 | 1 | 0 | 2 | 0 | 1 | 0 | X | 4 |

| Sheet C | 1 | 2 | 3 | 4 | 5 | 6 | 7 | 8 | 9 | 10 | Final |
|---|---|---|---|---|---|---|---|---|---|---|---|
| Ontario (Fleury) 🔨 | 2 | 0 | 0 | 1 | 1 | 0 | 0 | 2 | 1 | X | 7 |
| Northern Ontario (McCarville) | 0 | 2 | 0 | 0 | 0 | 1 | 2 | 0 | 0 | X | 5 |

| Sheet D | 1 | 2 | 3 | 4 | 5 | 6 | 7 | 8 | 9 | 10 | Final |
|---|---|---|---|---|---|---|---|---|---|---|---|
| New Brunswick (Kelly) 🔨 | 2 | 3 | 0 | 2 | 1 | 0 | 6 | 0 | X | X | 14 |
| Yukon (Birnie) | 0 | 0 | 1 | 0 | 0 | 1 | 0 | 1 | X | X | 3 |

=== Draw 7 ===
Monday, February 20, 8:30 am

| Sheet A | 1 | 2 | 3 | 4 | 5 | 6 | 7 | 8 | 9 | 10 | Final |
|---|---|---|---|---|---|---|---|---|---|---|---|
| Nova Scotia (Black) 🔨 | 1 | 0 | 1 | 1 | 3 | 0 | 1 | 1 | X | X | 8 |
| British Columbia (Grandy) | 0 | 1 | 0 | 0 | 0 | 1 | 0 | 0 | X | X | 2 |

| Sheet B | 1 | 2 | 3 | 4 | 5 | 6 | 7 | 8 | 9 | 10 | 11 | Final |
|---|---|---|---|---|---|---|---|---|---|---|---|---|
| Northern Ontario (McCarville) 🔨 | 1 | 0 | 2 | 0 | 1 | 0 | 0 | 0 | 2 | 0 | 2 | 8 |
| New Brunswick (Kelly) | 0 | 1 | 0 | 1 | 0 | 1 | 1 | 1 | 0 | 1 | 0 | 6 |

| Sheet C | 1 | 2 | 3 | 4 | 5 | 6 | 7 | 8 | 9 | 10 | Final |
|---|---|---|---|---|---|---|---|---|---|---|---|
| Nunavut (MacPhail) | 0 | 0 | 0 | 2 | 0 | 2 | 0 | 0 | 0 | X | 4 |
| Alberta (Skrlik) 🔨 | 3 | 0 | 1 | 0 | 2 | 0 | 0 | 0 | 3 | X | 9 |

| Sheet D | 1 | 2 | 3 | 4 | 5 | 6 | 7 | 8 | 9 | 10 | Final |
|---|---|---|---|---|---|---|---|---|---|---|---|
| Newfoundland and Labrador (Curtis) 🔨 | 1 | 0 | 2 | 0 | 0 | 3 | 0 | 2 | 0 | X | 8 |
| Northwest Territories (Galusha) | 0 | 2 | 0 | 3 | 1 | 0 | 4 | 0 | 4 | X | 14 |

=== Draw 8 ===
Monday, February 20, 1:30 pm

| Sheet A | 1 | 2 | 3 | 4 | 5 | 6 | 7 | 8 | 9 | 10 | Final |
|---|---|---|---|---|---|---|---|---|---|---|---|
| Manitoba (Jones) 🔨 | 1 | 0 | 0 | 0 | 1 | 0 | 1 | 1 | 0 | 2 | 6 |
| Ontario (Fleury) | 0 | 0 | 0 | 2 | 0 | 0 | 0 | 0 | 2 | 0 | 4 |

| Sheet B | 1 | 2 | 3 | 4 | 5 | 6 | 7 | 8 | 9 | 10 | Final |
|---|---|---|---|---|---|---|---|---|---|---|---|
| Saskatchewan (Silvernagle) 🔨 | 0 | 2 | 0 | 0 | 0 | 1 | 0 | 1 | 1 | 0 | 5 |
| Quebec (St-Georges) | 0 | 0 | 1 | 2 | 1 | 0 | 2 | 0 | 0 | 3 | 9 |

| Sheet C | 1 | 2 | 3 | 4 | 5 | 6 | 7 | 8 | 9 | 10 | Final |
|---|---|---|---|---|---|---|---|---|---|---|---|
| Yukon (Birnie) 🔨 | 3 | 0 | 1 | 1 | 0 | 3 | 1 | 0 | 1 | X | 10 |
| (Alberta) Wild Card #2 (Scheidegger) | 0 | 1 | 0 | 0 | 1 | 0 | 0 | 1 | 0 | X | 3 |

| Sheet D | 1 | 2 | 3 | 4 | 5 | 6 | 7 | 8 | 9 | 10 | Final |
|---|---|---|---|---|---|---|---|---|---|---|---|
| Prince Edward Island (Christianson) 🔨 | 0 | 0 | 1 | 0 | 0 | 0 | 0 | 1 | X | X | 2 |
| Canada (Einarson) | 1 | 0 | 0 | 3 | 1 | 2 | 2 | 0 | X | X | 9 |

=== Draw 9 ===
Monday, February 20, 6:30 pm

| Sheet A | 1 | 2 | 3 | 4 | 5 | 6 | 7 | 8 | 9 | 10 | Final |
|---|---|---|---|---|---|---|---|---|---|---|---|
| Alberta (Skrlik) 🔨 | 2 | 0 | 6 | 0 | 3 | 0 | 1 | 0 | X | X | 12 |
| Quebec (St-Georges) | 0 | 1 | 0 | 1 | 0 | 1 | 0 | 1 | X | X | 4 |

| Sheet B | 1 | 2 | 3 | 4 | 5 | 6 | 7 | 8 | 9 | 10 | Final |
|---|---|---|---|---|---|---|---|---|---|---|---|
| Ontario (Fleury) | 0 | 4 | 0 | 1 | 0 | 1 | 0 | 3 | 0 | 4 | 13 |
| Yukon (Birnie) 🔨 | 3 | 0 | 1 | 0 | 2 | 0 | 1 | 0 | 1 | 0 | 8 |

| Sheet C | 1 | 2 | 3 | 4 | 5 | 6 | 7 | 8 | 9 | 10 | Final |
|---|---|---|---|---|---|---|---|---|---|---|---|
| Nova Scotia (Black) | 0 | 1 | 2 | 0 | 1 | 0 | 0 | 0 | X | X | 4 |
| Canada (Einarson) 🔨 | 2 | 0 | 0 | 1 | 0 | 2 | 1 | 3 | X | X | 9 |

| Sheet D | 1 | 2 | 3 | 4 | 5 | 6 | 7 | 8 | 9 | 10 | Final |
|---|---|---|---|---|---|---|---|---|---|---|---|
| Northern Ontario (McCarville) | 0 | 3 | 0 | 2 | 0 | 0 | 1 | 0 | 2 | X | 8 |
| (Manitoba) Wild Card #3 (Walter) 🔨 | 2 | 0 | 2 | 0 | 0 | 0 | 0 | 1 | 0 | X | 5 |

=== Draw 10 ===
Tuesday, February 21, 8:30 am

| Sheet A | 1 | 2 | 3 | 4 | 5 | 6 | 7 | 8 | 9 | 10 | Final |
|---|---|---|---|---|---|---|---|---|---|---|---|
| (Alberta) Wild Card #2 (Scheidegger) 🔨 | 1 | 0 | 0 | 1 | 0 | 0 | 1 | 0 | 2 | 1 | 6 |
| New Brunswick (Kelly) | 0 | 1 | 1 | 0 | 1 | 3 | 0 | 1 | 0 | 0 | 7 |

| Sheet B | 1 | 2 | 3 | 4 | 5 | 6 | 7 | 8 | 9 | 10 | Final |
|---|---|---|---|---|---|---|---|---|---|---|---|
| British Columbia (Grandy) 🔨 | 2 | 0 | 0 | 3 | 2 | 1 | 4 | 0 | X | X | 12 |
| Nunavut (MacPhail) | 0 | 0 | 3 | 0 | 0 | 0 | 0 | 1 | X | X | 4 |

| Sheet C | 1 | 2 | 3 | 4 | 5 | 6 | 7 | 8 | 9 | 10 | Final |
|---|---|---|---|---|---|---|---|---|---|---|---|
| Manitoba (Jones) 🔨 | 3 | 0 | 5 | 0 | 0 | 0 | 1 | 0 | 0 | 1 | 10 |
| Northwest Territories (Galusha) | 0 | 2 | 0 | 2 | 1 | 1 | 0 | 1 | 1 | 0 | 8 |

| Sheet D | 1 | 2 | 3 | 4 | 5 | 6 | 7 | 8 | 9 | 10 | Final |
|---|---|---|---|---|---|---|---|---|---|---|---|
| Saskatchewan (Silvernagle) | 0 | 0 | 0 | 0 | 0 | 0 | 0 | 3 | 0 | X | 3 |
| (Manitoba) Wild Card #1 (Lawes) 🔨 | 0 | 0 | 1 | 1 | 0 | 2 | 1 | 0 | 3 | X | 8 |

=== Draw 11 ===
Tuesday, February 21, 1:30 pm

| Sheet A | 1 | 2 | 3 | 4 | 5 | 6 | 7 | 8 | 9 | 10 | Final |
|---|---|---|---|---|---|---|---|---|---|---|---|
| Canada (Einarson) 🔨 | 0 | 4 | 0 | 3 | 0 | 2 | 0 | 1 | X | X | 10 |
| Saskatchewan (Silvernagle) | 0 | 0 | 1 | 0 | 1 | 0 | 1 | 0 | X | X | 3 |

| Sheet B | 1 | 2 | 3 | 4 | 5 | 6 | 7 | 8 | 9 | 10 | Final |
|---|---|---|---|---|---|---|---|---|---|---|---|
| New Brunswick (Kelly) 🔨 | 1 | 0 | 0 | 2 | 0 | 1 | 0 | 1 | 0 | X | 5 |
| (Manitoba) Wild Card #3 (Walter) | 0 | 2 | 1 | 0 | 1 | 0 | 1 | 0 | 3 | X | 8 |

| Sheet C | 1 | 2 | 3 | 4 | 5 | 6 | 7 | 8 | 9 | 10 | Final |
|---|---|---|---|---|---|---|---|---|---|---|---|
| Alberta (Skrlik) | 0 | 0 | 3 | 2 | 2 | 0 | 0 | 1 | 0 | 2 | 10 |
| Prince Edward Island (Christianson) 🔨 | 2 | 1 | 0 | 0 | 0 | 1 | 1 | 0 | 2 | 0 | 7 |

| Sheet D | 1 | 2 | 3 | 4 | 5 | 6 | 7 | 8 | 9 | 10 | Final |
|---|---|---|---|---|---|---|---|---|---|---|---|
| Yukon (Birnie) | 0 | 0 | 0 | 0 | 0 | 2 | 0 | 3 | 0 | X | 5 |
| Manitoba (Jones) 🔨 | 2 | 1 | 1 | 2 | 2 | 0 | 1 | 0 | 1 | X | 10 |

=== Draw 12 ===
Tuesday, February 21, 6:30 pm

| Sheet A | 1 | 2 | 3 | 4 | 5 | 6 | 7 | 8 | 9 | 10 | Final |
|---|---|---|---|---|---|---|---|---|---|---|---|
| Northwest Territories (Galusha) | 0 | 1 | 0 | 1 | 0 | 0 | 1 | 0 | 1 | 0 | 4 |
| Northern Ontario (McCarville) 🔨 | 0 | 0 | 0 | 0 | 1 | 1 | 0 | 2 | 0 | 1 | 5 |

| Sheet B | 1 | 2 | 3 | 4 | 5 | 6 | 7 | 8 | 9 | 10 | Final |
|---|---|---|---|---|---|---|---|---|---|---|---|
| Quebec (St-Georges) 🔨 | 2 | 0 | 0 | 2 | 0 | 3 | 0 | 0 | 2 | X | 9 |
| (Manitoba) Wild Card #1 (Lawes) | 0 | 2 | 0 | 0 | 3 | 0 | 1 | 1 | 0 | X | 7 |

| Sheet C | 1 | 2 | 3 | 4 | 5 | 6 | 7 | 8 | 9 | 10 | Final |
|---|---|---|---|---|---|---|---|---|---|---|---|
| (Alberta) Wild Card #2 (Scheidegger) 🔨 | 5 | 0 | 0 | 3 | 0 | 0 | 1 | 1 | 2 | X | 12 |
| Newfoundland and Labrador (Curtis) | 0 | 1 | 0 | 0 | 3 | 1 | 0 | 0 | 0 | X | 5 |

| Sheet D | 1 | 2 | 3 | 4 | 5 | 6 | 7 | 8 | 9 | 10 | Final |
|---|---|---|---|---|---|---|---|---|---|---|---|
| Nunavut (MacPhail) | 0 | 0 | 0 | 3 | 1 | 0 | 0 | 1 | 0 | X | 5 |
| Nova Scotia (Black) 🔨 | 2 | 1 | 1 | 0 | 0 | 2 | 0 | 0 | 3 | X | 9 |

=== Draw 13 ===
Wednesday, February 22, 8:30 am

| Sheet A | 1 | 2 | 3 | 4 | 5 | 6 | 7 | 8 | 9 | 10 | Final |
|---|---|---|---|---|---|---|---|---|---|---|---|
| Quebec (St-Georges) 🔨 | 0 | 0 | 0 | 1 | 0 | 2 | 0 | 3 | 0 | 2 | 8 |
| Prince Edward Island (Christianson) | 0 | 0 | 0 | 0 | 2 | 0 | 1 | 0 | 1 | 0 | 4 |

| Sheet B | 1 | 2 | 3 | 4 | 5 | 6 | 7 | 8 | 9 | 10 | 11 | Final |
|---|---|---|---|---|---|---|---|---|---|---|---|---|
| (Alberta) Wild Card #2 (Scheidegger) | 0 | 1 | 0 | 1 | 2 | 0 | 0 | 0 | 2 | 0 | 0 | 6 |
| Manitoba (Jones) 🔨 | 0 | 0 | 2 | 0 | 0 | 1 | 1 | 1 | 0 | 1 | 1 | 7 |

| Sheet C | 1 | 2 | 3 | 4 | 5 | 6 | 7 | 8 | 9 | 10 | Final |
|---|---|---|---|---|---|---|---|---|---|---|---|
| Saskatchewan (Silvernagle) 🔨 | 1 | 0 | 0 | 3 | 0 | 2 | 0 | 7 | X | X | 13 |
| Nunavut (MacPhail) | 0 | 0 | 1 | 0 | 2 | 0 | 1 | 0 | X | X | 4 |

| Sheet D | 1 | 2 | 3 | 4 | 5 | 6 | 7 | 8 | 9 | 10 | Final |
|---|---|---|---|---|---|---|---|---|---|---|---|
| (Manitoba) Wild Card #3 (Walter) | 0 | 0 | 2 | 0 | 0 | 1 | 0 | 2 | 0 | X | 5 |
| Ontario (Fleury) 🔨 | 0 | 3 | 0 | 1 | 1 | 0 | 1 | 0 | 3 | X | 9 |

=== Draw 14 ===
Wednesday, February 22, 1:30 pm

| Sheet A | 1 | 2 | 3 | 4 | 5 | 6 | 7 | 8 | 9 | 10 | Final |
|---|---|---|---|---|---|---|---|---|---|---|---|
| New Brunswick (Kelly) | 0 | 0 | 4 | 0 | 1 | 0 | 1 | 1 | 0 | 1 | 8 |
| Newfoundland and Labrador (Curtis) 🔨 | 3 | 1 | 0 | 1 | 0 | 1 | 0 | 0 | 1 | 0 | 7 |

| Sheet B | 1 | 2 | 3 | 4 | 5 | 6 | 7 | 8 | 9 | 10 | Final |
|---|---|---|---|---|---|---|---|---|---|---|---|
| Alberta (Skrlik) | 0 | 0 | 1 | 0 | 2 | 0 | 0 | 2 | 2 | X | 7 |
| Nova Scotia (Black) 🔨 | 0 | 0 | 0 | 2 | 0 | 0 | 2 | 0 | 0 | X | 4 |

| Sheet C | 1 | 2 | 3 | 4 | 5 | 6 | 7 | 8 | 9 | 10 | Final |
|---|---|---|---|---|---|---|---|---|---|---|---|
| Northern Ontario (McCarville) 🔨 | 0 | 3 | 0 | 2 | 1 | 1 | 2 | 1 | X | X | 10 |
| Yukon (Birnie) | 0 | 0 | 2 | 0 | 0 | 0 | 0 | 0 | X | X | 2 |

| Sheet D | 1 | 2 | 3 | 4 | 5 | 6 | 7 | 8 | 9 | 10 | Final |
|---|---|---|---|---|---|---|---|---|---|---|---|
| (Manitoba) Wild Card #1 (Lawes) | 0 | 1 | 2 | 0 | 1 | 0 | 1 | 0 | 0 | 0 | 5 |
| British Columbia (Grandy) 🔨 | 1 | 0 | 0 | 2 | 0 | 1 | 0 | 1 | 0 | 2 | 7 |

=== Draw 15 ===
Wednesday, February 22, 6:30 pm

| Sheet A | 1 | 2 | 3 | 4 | 5 | 6 | 7 | 8 | 9 | 10 | Final |
|---|---|---|---|---|---|---|---|---|---|---|---|
| Nunavut (MacPhail) | 0 | 0 | 0 | 1 | 0 | 2 | 0 | 1 | X | X | 4 |
| (Manitoba) Wild Card #1 (Lawes) 🔨 | 0 | 2 | 4 | 0 | 3 | 0 | 1 | 0 | X | X | 10 |

| Sheet B | 1 | 2 | 3 | 4 | 5 | 6 | 7 | 8 | 9 | 10 | Final |
|---|---|---|---|---|---|---|---|---|---|---|---|
| Newfoundland and Labrador (Curtis) | 0 | 1 | 0 | 2 | 0 | 0 | 2 | 2 | 0 | 0 | 7 |
| Northern Ontario (McCarville) 🔨 | 2 | 0 | 2 | 0 | 1 | 1 | 0 | 0 | 1 | 1 | 8 |

| Sheet C | 1 | 2 | 3 | 4 | 5 | 6 | 7 | 8 | 9 | 10 | Final |
|---|---|---|---|---|---|---|---|---|---|---|---|
| Quebec (St-Georges) 🔨 | 1 | 0 | 2 | 0 | 3 | 0 | 0 | 0 | 3 | X | 9 |
| British Columbia (Grandy) | 0 | 0 | 0 | 2 | 0 | 1 | 2 | 1 | 0 | X | 6 |

| Sheet D | 1 | 2 | 3 | 4 | 5 | 6 | 7 | 8 | 9 | 10 | Final |
|---|---|---|---|---|---|---|---|---|---|---|---|
| Northwest Territories (Galusha) | 0 | 2 | 0 | 1 | 0 | 0 | 1 | 2 | 0 | 0 | 6 |
| (Alberta) Wild Card #2 (Scheidegger) 🔨 | 2 | 0 | 0 | 0 | 1 | 1 | 0 | 0 | 0 | 3 | 7 |

=== Draw 16 ===
Thursday, February 23, 8:30 am

| Sheet A | 1 | 2 | 3 | 4 | 5 | 6 | 7 | 8 | 9 | 10 | Final |
|---|---|---|---|---|---|---|---|---|---|---|---|
| Yukon (Birnie) | 0 | 0 | 0 | 1 | 0 | 0 | 0 | 1 | X | X | 2 |
| (Manitoba) Wild Card #3 (Walter) 🔨 | 1 | 1 | 1 | 0 | 3 | 1 | 2 | 0 | X | X | 9 |

| Sheet B | 1 | 2 | 3 | 4 | 5 | 6 | 7 | 8 | 9 | 10 | Final |
|---|---|---|---|---|---|---|---|---|---|---|---|
| Prince Edward Island (Christianson) 🔨 | 0 | 2 | 2 | 0 | 1 | 0 | 0 | 1 | 0 | 1 | 7 |
| Saskatchewan (Silvernagle) | 0 | 0 | 0 | 3 | 0 | 0 | 2 | 0 | 1 | 0 | 6 |

| Sheet C | 1 | 2 | 3 | 4 | 5 | 6 | 7 | 8 | 9 | 10 | Final |
|---|---|---|---|---|---|---|---|---|---|---|---|
| New Brunswick (Kelly) | 0 | 0 | 0 | 0 | 1 | 1 | 0 | 0 | 1 | X | 3 |
| Ontario (Fleury) 🔨 | 0 | 1 | 0 | 1 | 0 | 0 | 0 | 3 | 0 | X | 5 |

| Sheet D | 1 | 2 | 3 | 4 | 5 | 6 | 7 | 8 | 9 | 10 | Final |
|---|---|---|---|---|---|---|---|---|---|---|---|
| Canada (Einarson) 🔨 | 0 | 2 | 0 | 1 | 0 | 4 | 0 | 1 | 0 | 1 | 9 |
| Alberta (Skrlik) | 1 | 0 | 2 | 0 | 1 | 0 | 2 | 0 | 2 | 0 | 8 |

=== Draw 17 ===
Thursday, February 23, 1:30 pm

| Sheet A | 1 | 2 | 3 | 4 | 5 | 6 | 7 | 8 | 9 | 10 | Final |
|---|---|---|---|---|---|---|---|---|---|---|---|
| Ontario (Fleury) | 0 | 2 | 0 | 0 | 3 | 0 | 4 | 0 | X | X | 9 |
| (Alberta) Wild Card #2 (Scheidegger) 🔨 | 1 | 0 | 0 | 1 | 0 | 2 | 0 | 1 | X | X | 5 |

| Sheet B | 1 | 2 | 3 | 4 | 5 | 6 | 7 | 8 | 9 | 10 | Final |
|---|---|---|---|---|---|---|---|---|---|---|---|
| Yukon (Birnie) 🔨 | 1 | 0 | 2 | 0 | 1 | 0 | 0 | 2 | 0 | X | 6 |
| Northwest Territories (Galusha) | 0 | 3 | 0 | 1 | 0 | 2 | 2 | 0 | 1 | X | 9 |

| Sheet C | 1 | 2 | 3 | 4 | 5 | 6 | 7 | 8 | 9 | 10 | Final |
|---|---|---|---|---|---|---|---|---|---|---|---|
| Newfoundland and Labrador (Curtis) | 1 | 0 | 0 | 2 | 0 | 5 | 0 | 0 | 2 | 0 | 10 |
| (Manitoba) Wild Card #3 (Walter) 🔨 | 0 | 1 | 1 | 0 | 1 | 0 | 3 | 1 | 0 | 2 | 9 |

| Sheet D | 1 | 2 | 3 | 4 | 5 | 6 | 7 | 8 | 9 | 10 | Final |
|---|---|---|---|---|---|---|---|---|---|---|---|
| Manitoba (Jones) 🔨 | 2 | 1 | 0 | 2 | 2 | 0 | 0 | 1 | 0 | X | 8 |
| New Brunswick (Kelly) | 0 | 0 | 3 | 0 | 0 | 1 | 0 | 0 | 1 | X | 5 |

=== Draw 18 ===
Thursday, February 23, 6:30 pm

| Sheet A | 1 | 2 | 3 | 4 | 5 | 6 | 7 | 8 | 9 | 10 | Final |
|---|---|---|---|---|---|---|---|---|---|---|---|
| British Columbia (Grandy) 🔨 | 1 | 1 | 0 | 0 | 1 | 0 | 2 | 0 | 0 | 3 | 8 |
| Alberta (Skrlik) | 0 | 0 | 1 | 1 | 0 | 2 | 0 | 0 | 2 | 0 | 6 |

| Sheet B | 1 | 2 | 3 | 4 | 5 | 6 | 7 | 8 | 9 | 10 | Final |
|---|---|---|---|---|---|---|---|---|---|---|---|
| Nunavut (MacPhail) | 0 | 1 | 0 | 0 | 0 | 1 | 0 | 1 | X | X | 3 |
| Canada (Einarson) 🔨 | 4 | 0 | 2 | 1 | 3 | 0 | 1 | 0 | X | X | 11 |

| Sheet C | 1 | 2 | 3 | 4 | 5 | 6 | 7 | 8 | 9 | 10 | Final |
|---|---|---|---|---|---|---|---|---|---|---|---|
| Prince Edward Island (Christianson) | 0 | 1 | 0 | 2 | 1 | 0 | 1 | 0 | 1 | X | 6 |
| (Manitoba) Wild Card #1 (Lawes) 🔨 | 2 | 0 | 1 | 0 | 0 | 5 | 0 | 2 | 0 | X | 10 |

| Sheet D | 1 | 2 | 3 | 4 | 5 | 6 | 7 | 8 | 9 | 10 | Final |
|---|---|---|---|---|---|---|---|---|---|---|---|
| Nova Scotia (Black) 🔨 | 1 | 0 | 2 | 0 | 1 | 0 | 0 | 0 | 2 | 1 | 7 |
| Quebec (St-Georges) | 0 | 2 | 0 | 0 | 0 | 1 | 0 | 3 | 0 | 0 | 6 |

== Tiebreakers ==
Friday, February 24, 8:30 am

| Sheet A | 1 | 2 | 3 | 4 | 5 | 6 | 7 | 8 | 9 | 10 | 11 | Final |
|---|---|---|---|---|---|---|---|---|---|---|---|---|
| Nova Scotia (Black) 🔨 | 0 | 2 | 0 | 2 | 0 | 1 | 0 | 0 | 0 | 1 | 1 | 7 |
| (Manitoba) Wild Card #1 (Lawes) | 2 | 0 | 1 | 0 | 2 | 0 | 0 | 1 | 0 | 0 | 0 | 6 |

Player percentages
| Nova Scotia | | (Manitoba) Wild Card #1 | |
|---|---|---|---|
| Shelley Barker | 82% | Kristin MacCuish | 88% |
| Karlee Everist | 77% | Jocelyn Peterman | 80% |
| Jenn Baxter | 84% | Laura Walker | 83% |
| Christina Black | 88% | Kaitlyn Lawes | 81% |
| Total | 83% | Total | 83% |

| Sheet B | 1 | 2 | 3 | 4 | 5 | 6 | 7 | 8 | 9 | 10 | Final |
|---|---|---|---|---|---|---|---|---|---|---|---|
| Quebec (St-Georges) 🔨 | 0 | 1 | 0 | 0 | 1 | 0 | 1 | 0 | X | X | 3 |
| British Columbia (Grandy) | 0 | 0 | 2 | 1 | 0 | 2 | 0 | 3 | X | X | 8 |

Player percentages
| Quebec | | British Columbia | |
|---|---|---|---|
| Kelly Middaugh | 95% | Sarah Loken | 86% |
| Alanna Routledge | 81% | Lindsay Dubue | 89% |
| Emily Riley | 78% | Kayla MacMillan | 81% |
| Laurie St-Georges | 69% | Clancy Grandy | 94% |
| Total | 81% | Total | 88% |

== Championship round ==
Semifinals
B2 | Manitoba | 9
A3 | British Columbia | 4
A2 | Nova Scotia | 7
B3 | Ontario | 6

Finals
A1 | Canada | 6
B2 | Manitoba | 8
B1 | Northern Ontario | 6
A2 | Nova Scotia | 3

=== Semifinals ===
Friday, February 24, 1:00 pm

| Sheet A | 1 | 2 | 3 | 4 | 5 | 6 | 7 | 8 | 9 | 10 | Final |
|---|---|---|---|---|---|---|---|---|---|---|---|
| Manitoba (Jones) 🔨 | 1 | 1 | 0 | 1 | 0 | 2 | 0 | 2 | 2 | X | 9 |
| British Columbia (Grandy) | 0 | 0 | 1 | 0 | 2 | 0 | 1 | 0 | 0 | X | 4 |

Player percentages
| Manitoba | | British Columbia | |
|---|---|---|---|
| Lauren Lenentine | 97% | Sarah Loken | 94% |
| Mackenzie Zacharias | 94% | Lindsay Dubue | 88% |
| Karlee Burgess | 92% | Kayla MacMillan | 53% |
| Jennifer Jones | 88% | Clancy Grandy | 68% |
| Total | 93% | Total | 76% |

| Sheet D | 1 | 2 | 3 | 4 | 5 | 6 | 7 | 8 | 9 | 10 | 11 | Final |
|---|---|---|---|---|---|---|---|---|---|---|---|---|
| Nova Scotia (Black) | 0 | 1 | 0 | 0 | 1 | 0 | 1 | 1 | 0 | 2 | 1 | 7 |
| Ontario (Fleury) 🔨 | 2 | 0 | 0 | 1 | 0 | 1 | 0 | 0 | 2 | 0 | 0 | 6 |

Player percentages
| Nova Scotia | | Ontario | |
|---|---|---|---|
| Shelley Barker | 89% | Sarah Wilkes | 83% |
| Karlee Everist | 84% | Emma Miskew | 85% |
| Jenn Baxter | 75% | Tracy Fleury | 78% |
| Christina Black | 81% | Rachel Homan | 78% |
| Total | 82% | Total | 81% |

=== Finals ===
Friday, February 24, 6:00 pm

| Sheet B | 1 | 2 | 3 | 4 | 5 | 6 | 7 | 8 | 9 | 10 | Final |
|---|---|---|---|---|---|---|---|---|---|---|---|
| Northern Ontario (McCarville) 🔨 | 0 | 2 | 1 | 0 | 1 | 0 | 0 | 0 | 0 | 2 | 6 |
| Nova Scotia (Black) | 0 | 0 | 0 | 1 | 0 | 2 | 0 | 0 | 0 | 0 | 3 |

Player percentages
| Northern Ontario | | Nova Scotia | |
|---|---|---|---|
| Sarah Potts | 89% | Shelley Barker | 86% |
| Ashley Sippala | 93% | Karlee Everist | 71% |
| Kendra Lilly | 85% | Jenn Baxter | 81% |
| Krista McCarville | 86% | Christina Black | 81% |
| Total | 88% | Total | 80% |

| Sheet D | 1 | 2 | 3 | 4 | 5 | 6 | 7 | 8 | 9 | 10 | Final |
|---|---|---|---|---|---|---|---|---|---|---|---|
| Canada (Einarson) 🔨 | 0 | 0 | 2 | 0 | 0 | 2 | 0 | 1 | 1 | 0 | 6 |
| Manitoba (Jones) | 0 | 4 | 0 | 0 | 2 | 0 | 1 | 0 | 0 | 1 | 8 |

Player percentages
| Canada | | Manitoba | |
|---|---|---|---|
| Briane Harris | 90% | Emily Zacharias | 91% |
| Shannon Birchard | 93% | Mackenzie Zacharias | 94% |
| Val Sweeting | 90% | Karlee Burgess | 93% |
| Kerri Einarson | 80% | Jennifer Jones | 94% |
| Total | 88% | Total | 93% |

== Playoffs ==
Page playoff system
1 | Northern Ontario | 5
2 | Manitoba | 8
3 | Canada | 9
4 | Nova Scotia | 4

Semifinal
1 | Northern Ontario | 5
3 | Canada | 7

Final
2 | Manitoba | 4
3 | Canada | 10

=== 1 vs. 2 ===
Saturday, February 25, 6:00 pm

| Sheet C | 1 | 2 | 3 | 4 | 5 | 6 | 7 | 8 | 9 | 10 | Final |
|---|---|---|---|---|---|---|---|---|---|---|---|
| Northern Ontario (McCarville) | 1 | 1 | 1 | 0 | 0 | 1 | 0 | 0 | 1 | 0 | 5 |
| Manitoba (Jones) 🔨 | 0 | 0 | 0 | 2 | 1 | 0 | 1 | 1 | 0 | 3 | 8 |

Player percentages
| Northern Ontario | | Manitoba | |
|---|---|---|---|
| Sarah Potts | 91% | Lauren Lenentine | 88% |
| Ashley Sippala | 69% | Mackenzie Zacharias | 79% |
| Kendra Lilly | 59% | Karlee Burgess | 81% |
| Krista McCarville | 60% | Jennifer Jones | 72% |
| Total | 70% | Total | 80% |

=== 3 vs. 4 ===
Saturday, February 25, 1:00 pm

| Sheet C | 1 | 2 | 3 | 4 | 5 | 6 | 7 | 8 | 9 | 10 | Final |
|---|---|---|---|---|---|---|---|---|---|---|---|
| Canada (Einarson) 🔨 | 1 | 0 | 2 | 0 | 2 | 0 | 2 | 0 | 2 | X | 9 |
| Nova Scotia (Black) | 0 | 1 | 0 | 1 | 0 | 1 | 0 | 1 | 0 | X | 4 |

Player percentages
| Canada | | Nova Scotia | |
|---|---|---|---|
| Briane Harris | 93% | Shelley Barker | 89% |
| Shannon Birchard | 78% | Karlee Everist | 66% |
| Val Sweeting | 86% | Jenn Baxter | 68% |
| Kerri Einarson | 96% | Christina Black | 69% |
| Total | 88% | Total | 73% |

=== Semifinal ===
Sunday, February 26, 12:00 pm

| Sheet C | 1 | 2 | 3 | 4 | 5 | 6 | 7 | 8 | 9 | 10 | Final |
|---|---|---|---|---|---|---|---|---|---|---|---|
| Northern Ontario (McCarville) 🔨 | 1 | 1 | 0 | 1 | 0 | 0 | 1 | 0 | 1 | 0 | 5 |
| Canada (Einarson) | 0 | 0 | 3 | 0 | 0 | 1 | 0 | 2 | 0 | 1 | 7 |

Player percentages
| Northern Ontario | | Canada | |
|---|---|---|---|
| Sarah Potts | 85% | Briane Harris | 94% |
| Ashley Sippala | 79% | Shannon Birchard | 86% |
| Kendra Lilly | 69% | Val Sweeting | 84% |
| Krista McCarville | 79% | Kerri Einarson | 71% |
| Total | 78% | Total | 84% |

=== Final ===
Sunday, February 26, 6:00 pm

| Sheet C | 1 | 2 | 3 | 4 | 5 | 6 | 7 | 8 | 9 | 10 | Final |
|---|---|---|---|---|---|---|---|---|---|---|---|
| Manitoba (Jones) 🔨 | 1 | 0 | 1 | 0 | 0 | 1 | 0 | 1 | 0 | X | 4 |
| Canada (Einarson) | 0 | 1 | 0 | 1 | 2 | 0 | 1 | 0 | 5 | X | 10 |

Player percentages
| Manitoba | | Canada | |
|---|---|---|---|
| Lauren Lenentine | 97% | Briane Harris | 97% |
| Mackenzie Zacharias | 88% | Shannon Birchard | 89% |
| Karlee Burgess | 79% | Val Sweeting | 86% |
| Jennifer Jones | 69% | Kerri Einarson | 89% |
| Total | 83% | Total | 90% |

== Statistics ==
=== Top 5 player percentages ===
Final Round Robin Percentages; minimum 6 games

Key
| First All-Star Team |
| Second All-Star Team |

| Leads | % |
|---|---|
| (Northern Ontario) Sarah Potts | 88 |
| (Canada) Briane Harris | 88 |
| (New Brunswick) Katie Forward | 88 |
| (British Columbia) Sarah Loken | 88 |
| (Ontario) Sarah Wilkes | 87 |
| (Quebec) Kelly Middaugh | 87 |
| (Northwest Territories) Kerry Galusha (Skip) | 87 |

| Seconds | % |
|---|---|
| (Canada) Shannon Birchard | 86 |
| (Ontario) Emma Miskew | 85 |
| (Alberta) Geri-Lynn Ramsay | 82 |
| (British Columbia) Lindsay Dubue | 82 |
| (Manitoba) Mackenzie Zacharias | 82 |

| Thirds | % |
|---|---|
| (Canada) Val Sweeting | 86 |
| WC1 Laura Walker | 84 |
| (Saskatchewan) Kelly Schafer | 82 |
| (Ontario) Tracy Fleury (Skip) | 81 |
| WC2 Kate Cameron | 81 |

| Skips | % |
|---|---|
| (Canada) Kerri Einarson | 83 |
| (Ontario) Rachel Homan (Fourth) | 82 |
| (Manitoba) Jennifer Jones | 81 |
| (New Brunswick) Andrea Kelly | 79 |
| WC1 Kaitlyn Lawes | 78 |
| (Northwest Territories) Jo-Ann Rizzo (Fourth) | 78 |
| (Northern Ontario) Krista McCarville | 78 |
| (Alberta) Kayla Skrlik | 78 |

=== Perfect games ===
| Player | Team | Position | Shots | Opponent |
|---|---|---|---|---|
| Kerri Einarson | Canada | Skip | 16 | Prince Edward Island |

== Awards ==
The awards and all-star teams were as follows:

=== All-Star teams ===
First Team
| Position | Name | Team |
|---|---|---|
| Skip | Kerri Einarson | Canada |
| Third | Val Sweeting | Canada |
| Second | Shannon Birchard | Canada |
| Lead | Sarah Potts | Northern Ontario |

Second Team
| Position | Name | Team |
|---|---|---|
| Skip | Rachel Homan (Fourth) | Ontario |
| Third | Laura Walker | (Manitoba) Wild Card 1 |
| Second | Emma Miskew | Ontario |
| Lead | Briane Harris | Canada |

=== Marj Mitchell Sportsmanship Award ===
The Marj Mitchell Sportsmanship Award was presented to the player chosen by their fellow peers as the curler that most exemplified sportsmanship and dedication to curling during the annual Scotties Tournament of Hearts.

| Name | Position | Team |
|---|---|---|
| Kerry Galusha (Lead) | Skip | Northwest Territories |

=== Sandra Schmirler Most Valuable Player Award ===
The Sandra Schmirler Most Valuable Player Award was awarded to the top player in the playoff round by members of the media in the Scotties Tournament of Hearts.

| Name | Position | Team |
|---|---|---|
| Kerri Einarson (4) | Skip | Canada |

Einarson's fourth MVP award set a record for the most playoff MVP awards won by a single player.

In a touching moment following the event, Einarson bestowed the MVP honour to her teammate and lead Briane Harris, who competed in the tournament while being five months pregnant.

=== Joan Mead Builder Award ===
The Joan Mead Builder Award recognizes a builder in the sport of curling named in the honour of the late CBC curling producer Joan Mead.

- Dianne Barker – umpire at provincial, national, World, and three Olympic curling tournaments, board member of Curl BC and Curling Canada, and a lifetime member of the Kamloops Curling Club.

=== Paul McLean Award ===
The Paul McLean Award is presented by TSN to a person behind the scenes who has made a significant contribution to the sport of curling.

- Dave Komosky – editor of Curling Canada's Extra End publications and has covered curling for over 50 years from covering numerous Canadian and international championships. He's covered 35 Briers as a reporter for the Winnipeg Tribune, Calgary Herald, Saskatoon Star-Phoenix, and Curling Canada's event newspapers such as the Heart Chart, Tankard Times, and curling.ca.

== Provincial and territorial playdowns ==
- 2023 Alberta Scotties Tournament of Hearts: January 18–22
- 2023 British Columbia Scotties Tournament of Hearts: January 11–15
- 2023 Manitoba Scotties Tournament of Hearts: January 25–29
- 2023 New Brunswick Scotties Tournament of Hearts: January 18–22
- 2023 Newfoundland and Labrador Scotties Tournament of Hearts: January 26–29
- 2023 Northern Ontario Scotties Tournament of Hearts: January 25–29
- 2023 Northwest Territories Scotties Tournament of Hearts: January 11–15
- 2023 Nova Scotia Scotties Tournament of Hearts: January 26–30
- 2023 Nunavut Scotties Tournament of Hearts: December 16–17
- 2023 Ontario Scotties Tournament of Hearts: January 23–29
- 2023 Prince Edward Island Scotties Tournament of Hearts: January 26–28
- 2023 Quebec Scotties Tournament of Hearts: January 10–14
- 2023 Saskatchewan Scotties Tournament of Hearts: January 25–29
- 2023 Yukon Scotties Tournament of Hearts: Not held (Note: Team Hailey Birnie qualified by default as no other team entered the tournament.)
