= 2023 International Bernese Ladies Cup =

World Curling Tour event

- Host city: Bern, Switzerland
- Arena: Curling Bern
- Dates: January 26–29
- Winner: (Switzerland) Team Tirinzoni
- Curling club: CC Aarau, Aarau
- Skip: Silvana Tirinzoni
- Fourth: Alina Pätz
- Second: Carole Howald
- Lead: Briar Schwaller-Hürlimann
- Coach: Pierre Charette
- Finalist: (Sweden) Isabella Wranå

The 2023 International Bernese Ladies Cup was held from January 26 to 29 at Curling Bern in Bern, Switzerland as part of the World Curling Tour. The event was held in a round-robin format with a purse of 18,200 CHF.

== Teams ==
The teams are listed as follows:

Skip	Third	Second	Lead	Alternate	Locale
Emma Barr	Nicola Joiner	Rachel Dakers	Shannon Whattley		Stirling, Scotland
Stefania Constantini	Marta Lo Deserto	Angela Romei	Giulia Zardini Lacedelli		Cortina d'Ampezzo, Italy
Beth Farmer	Hailey Duff	Kirstin Bousie	Katie McMillan	Amy MacDonald	Stirling, Scotland
Clancy Grandy	Kayla MacMillan	Lindsay Dubue	Sarah Loken		Vancouver, British Columbia, Canada
Ha Seung-youn	Kim Hye-rin	Yang Tae-i	Kim Su-jin		Chuncheon, South Korea
Corrie Hürlimann	Melina Bezzola	Nadine Bärtschiger	Anna Gut	Celine Schwizgebel	Zug, Switzerland
Michèle Jäggi	Irene Schori	Stefanie Berset	Sarah Müller	Lara Stocker	Bern, Switzerland
Daniela Jentsch	Emira Abbes	Mia Höhne	Analena Jentsch		Füssen, Germany
Selina Witschonke (Fourth)	Elena Mathis	Raphaela Keiser (Skip)	Marina Lörtscher		St. Moritz, Switzerland
Kim Sutor (Fourth)	Sara Messenzehl (Skip)	Zoé Antes	Anne Kapp	Elisa Scheuerl	Füssen, Germany
Rebecca Morrison	Gina Aitken	Sophie Sinclair	Sophie Jackson		Stirling, Scotland
Lisa Muhmenthaler (Fourth)	Ariane Oberson (Skip)	Noa Kusano	Jana Hählen	Nina Rufer	Arlesheim, Switzerland
Xenia Schwaller	Selina Gafner	Fabienne Rieder	Selina Rychiger	Marion Wüest	Zurich, Switzerland
Alina Pätz (Fourth)	Silvana Tirinzoni (Skip)	Carole Howald	Briar Schwaller-Hürlimann		Aarau, Switzerland
Isabella Wranå	Almida de Val	Maria Larsson	Linda Stenlund		Sundbyberg, Sweden
Anna Stern (Fourth)	Flurina Kobler	Nora Wüest (Skip)	Karin Winter		Wallisellen, Switzerland
Dilşat Yıldız	Öznur Polat	Berfin Şengül	İfayet Şafak Çalıkuşu	Mihriban Polat	Erzurum, Turkey
Alžběta Zelingrová	Aneta Müllerová	Michaela Baudyšová	Klára Svatoňová		Prague, Czech Republic

== Round robin standings ==
Final Round Robin Standings

Key
Teams to Playoffs

Pool A	W	L	PF	PA
(Switzerland) Silvana Tirinzoni	5	0	27	13
(Germany) Daniela Jentsch	4	1	36	19
(Italy) Stefania Constantini	2	3	22	21
(Switzerland) Nora Wüest	2	3	24	25
(Turkey) Dilşat Yıldız	1	4	18	29
(Scotland) Beth Farmer	1	4	12	32

Pool B	W	L	PF	PA
(Sweden) Isabella Wranå	5	0	38	16
(South Korea) Ha Seung-youn	4	1	33	25
(Switzerland) Michèle Jäggi	3	2	29	25
(Switzerland) Xenia Schwaller	2	3	29	32
(Germany) Sara Messenzehl	1	4	18	32
(Czech Republic) Alžběta Zelingrová	0	5	19	36

Pool C	W	L	PF	PA
(Switzerland) Raphaela Keiser	4	1	27	19
(Canada) Clancy Grandy	4	1	34	19
(Switzerland) Corrie Hürlimann	3	2	31	23
(Scotland) Rebecca Morrison	3	2	26	21
(Scotland) Emma Barr	1	4	16	37
(Switzerland) Ariane Oberson	0	5	20	35

== Round robin results ==
All draw times listed in Central European Time (UTC+01:00).

=== Draw 1 ===
Thursday, January 26, 7:30 pm

Sheet 1	1	2	3	4	5	6	7	8	Final
(Scotland) Beth Farmer	0	0	0	0	0	2	X	X	2
(Turkey) Dilşat Yıldız	1	0	0	1	5	0	X	X	7

Sheet 2	1	2	3	4	5	6	7	8	Final
(Sweden) Isabella Wranå	2	0	1	0	3	0	2	X	8
(Czech Republic) Alžběta Zelingrová	0	2	0	2	0	1	0	X	5

Sheet 3	1	2	3	4	5	6	7	8	Final
(Switzerland) Michèle Jäggi	0	0	3	0	1	0	1	1	6
(Switzerland) Xenia Schwaller	1	1	0	2	0	0	0	0	4

Sheet 4	1	2	3	4	5	6	7	8	Final
(Switzerland) Raphaela Keiser	1	0	0	2	1	0	0	1	5
(Canada) Clancy Grandy	0	2	0	0	0	1	1	0	4

Sheet 5	1	2	3	4	5	6	7	8	Final
(Switzerland) Silvana Tirinzoni	1	0	0	1	0	1	1	2	6
(Italy) Stefania Constantini	0	1	1	0	1	0	0	0	3

Sheet 6	1	2	3	4	5	6	7	8	Final
(South Korea) Ha Seung-youn	0	0	3	0	3	X	X	X	6
(Germany) Sara Messenzehl	0	0	0	1	0	X	X	X	1

Sheet 7	1	2	3	4	5	6	7	8	Final
(Scotland) Rebecca Morrison	3	4	0	3	2	X	X	X	12
(Scotland) Emma Barr	0	0	2	0	0	X	X	X	2

Sheet 8	1	2	3	4	5	6	7	8	Final
(Switzerland) Corrie Hürlimann	1	0	3	2	4	0	X	X	10
(Switzerland) Ariane Oberson	0	2	0	0	0	3	X	X	5

=== Draw 2 ===
Friday, January 27, 9:00 am

Sheet 1	1	2	3	4	5	6	7	8	Final
(Switzerland) Michèle Jäggi	2	0	0	1	0	3	2	X	8
(Germany) Sara Messenzehl	0	1	2	0	1	0	0	X	4

Sheet 2	1	2	3	4	5	6	7	8	Final
(Germany) Daniela Jentsch	0	3	0	1	0	1	0	1	6
(Switzerland) Nora Wüest	0	0	3	0	1	0	1	0	5

Sheet 3	1	2	3	4	5	6	7	8	Final
(Italy) Stefania Constantini	0	0	0	1	0	0	1	X	2
(Scotland) Beth Farmer	0	1	1	0	0	1	0	X	3

Sheet 4	1	2	3	4	5	6	7	8	Final
(Sweden) Isabella Wranå	0	2	0	0	4	3	X	X	9
(South Korea) Ha Seung-youn	1	0	2	1	0	0	X	X	4

Sheet 5	1	2	3	4	5	6	7	8	Final
(Scotland) Rebecca Morrison	2	1	0	0	0	1	0	1	5
(Switzerland) Corrie Hürlimann	0	0	2	0	0	0	2	0	4

Sheet 6	1	2	3	4	5	6	7	8	Final
(Switzerland) Raphaela Keiser	1	1	0	0	0	0	3	1	6
(Switzerland) Ariane Oberson	0	0	2	1	1	1	0	0	5

Sheet 7	1	2	3	4	5	6	7	8	Final
(Switzerland) Silvana Tirinzoni	0	0	2	0	0	1	0	X	3
(Turkey) Dilşat Yıldız	0	0	0	0	0	0	1	X	1

Sheet 8	1	2	3	4	5	6	7	8	Final
(Canada) Clancy Grandy	4	0	2	0	3	X	X	X	9
(Scotland) Emma Barr	0	1	0	1	0	X	X	X	2

=== Draw 3 ===
Friday, January 27, 2:00 pm

Sheet 1	1	2	3	4	5	6	7	8	Final
(Switzerland) Raphaela Keiser	0	1	1	0	3	1	X	X	6
(Scotland) Rebecca Morrison	0	0	0	1	0	0	X	X	1

Sheet 2	1	2	3	4	5	6	7	8	Final
(Switzerland) Xenia Schwaller	2	0	0	5	0	0	2	X	9
(Germany) Sara Messenzehl	0	0	1	0	2	1	0	X	4

Sheet 3	1	2	3	4	5	6	7	8	Final
(South Korea) Ha Seung-youn	0	0	3	3	0	2	X	X	8
(Czech Republic) Alžběta Zelingrová	0	1	0	0	1	0	X	X	2

Sheet 4	1	2	3	4	5	6	7	8	Final
(Germany) Daniela Jentsch	0	2	2	2	4	X	X	X	10
(Turkey) Dilşat Yıldız	2	0	0	0	0	X	X	X	2

Sheet 5	1	2	3	4	5	6	7	8	Final
(Sweden) Isabella Wranå	0	0	4	0	1	0	1	0	6
(Switzerland) Michèle Jäggi	0	0	0	2	0	1	0	1	4

Sheet 6	1	2	3	4	5	6	7	8	Final
(Canada) Clancy Grandy	1	0	2	1	0	4	0	X	8
(Switzerland) Corrie Hürlimann	0	1	0	0	2	0	1	X	4

Sheet 7	1	2	3	4	5	6	7	8	Final
(Scotland) Beth Farmer	1	0	0	0	1	0	0	X	2
(Switzerland) Nora Wüest	0	2	0	1	0	1	2	X	6

=== Draw 4 ===
Friday, January 27, 7:00 pm

Sheet 3	1	2	3	4	5	6	7	8	Final
(Switzerland) Corrie Hürlimann	0	0	2	1	1	0	3	X	7
(Scotland) Emma Barr	0	1	0	0	0	1	0	X	2

Sheet 4	1	2	3	4	5	6	7	8	Final
(Italy) Stefania Constantini	0	1	1	0	1	0	0	2	5
(Switzerland) Nora Wüest	2	0	0	1	0	1	0	0	4

Sheet 5	1	2	3	4	5	6	7	8	Final
(Canada) Clancy Grandy	2	3	0	1	0	0	1	X	7
(Switzerland) Ariane Oberson	0	0	1	0	2	2	0	X	5

Sheet 6	1	2	3	4	5	6	7	8	9	Final
(Switzerland) Silvana Tirinzoni	0	1	0	2	1	0	0	0	1	5
(Germany) Daniela Jentsch	1	0	1	0	0	1	0	1	0	4

Sheet 7	1	2	3	4	5	6	7	8	9	Final
(Sweden) Isabella Wranå	1	0	1	0	0	0	0	1	1	4
(Germany) Sara Messenzehl	0	0	0	0	1	1	1	0	0	3

Sheet 8	1	2	3	4	5	6	7	8	Final
(Switzerland) Xenia Schwaller	2	0	0	3	0	1	3	X	9
(Czech Republic) Alžběta Zelingrová	0	2	0	0	1	0	0	X	3

=== Draw 5 ===
Saturday, January 28, 9:00 am

Sheet 1	1	2	3	4	5	6	7	8	Final
(Switzerland) Silvana Tirinzoni	1	3	0	1	0	0	1	X	6
(Switzerland) Nora Wüest	0	0	1	0	0	1	0	X	2

Sheet 2	1	2	3	4	5	6	7	8	Final
(Canada) Clancy Grandy	3	0	1	0	2	X	X	X	6
(Scotland) Rebecca Morrison	0	2	0	1	0	X	X	X	3

Sheet 3	1	2	3	4	5	6	7	8	Final
(Scotland) Emma Barr	0	1	1	1	3	1	X	X	7
(Switzerland) Ariane Oberson	2	0	0	0	0	0	X	X	2

Sheet 4	1	2	3	4	5	6	7	8	Final
(Switzerland) Michèle Jäggi	1	1	0	0	3	0	0	X	5
(Czech Republic) Alžběta Zelingrová	0	0	2	0	0	1	1	X	4

Sheet 5	1	2	3	4	5	6	7	8	9	Final
(South Korea) Ha Seung-youn	1	0	2	0	0	3	0	1	1	8
(Switzerland) Xenia Schwaller	0	1	0	3	0	0	3	0	0	7

Sheet 6	1	2	3	4	5	6	7	8	Final
(Italy) Stefania Constantini	2	0	2	1	2	0	X	X	7
(Turkey) Dilşat Yıldız	0	1	0	0	0	1	X	X	2

Sheet 7	1	2	3	4	5	6	7	8	Final
(Switzerland) Raphaela Keiser	0	1	1	0	1	0	0	0	3
(Switzerland) Corrie Hürlimann	1	0	0	1	0	2	1	1	6

Sheet 8	1	2	3	4	5	6	7	8	Final
(Germany) Daniela Jentsch	0	2	4	0	4	X	X	X	10
(Scotland) Beth Farmer	0	0	0	2	0	X	X	X	2

=== Draw 6 ===
Saturday, January 28, 2:00 pm

Sheet 1	1	2	3	4	5	6	7	8	Final
(Sweden) Isabella Wranå	2	2	3	4	X	X	X	X	11
(Switzerland) Xenia Schwaller	0	0	0	0	X	X	X	X	0

Sheet 2	1	2	3	4	5	6	7	8	Final
(Switzerland) Michèle Jäggi	0	0	1	0	3	0	2	0	6
(South Korea) Ha Seung-youn	0	1	0	2	0	2	0	2	7

Sheet 3	1	2	3	4	5	6	7	8	9	Final
(Czech Republic) Alžběta Zelingrová	0	0	0	2	0	1	2	0	0	5
(Germany) Sara Messenzehl	1	0	1	0	2	0	0	1	1	6

Sheet 4	1	2	3	4	5	6	7	8	Final
(Switzerland) Silvana Tirinzoni	0	2	0	2	1	0	2	X	7
(Scotland) Beth Farmer	1	0	1	0	0	1	0	X	3

Sheet 5	1	2	3	4	5	6	7	8	Final
(Switzerland) Raphaela Keiser	1	4	0	1	1	0	X	X	7
(Scotland) Emma Barr	0	0	2	0	0	1	X	X	3

Sheet 6	1	2	3	4	5	6	7	8	Final
(Scotland) Rebecca Morrison	0	2	1	0	1	0	1	X	5
(Switzerland) Ariane Oberson	1	0	0	1	0	1	0	X	3

Sheet 7	1	2	3	4	5	6	7	8	Final
(Italy) Stefania Constantini	0	3	0	0	0	0	2	0	5
(Germany) Daniela Jentsch	1	0	3	0	0	1	0	1	6

Sheet 8	1	2	3	4	5	6	7	8	Final
(Turkey) Dilşat Yıldız	0	2	0	2	1	0	1	0	6
(Switzerland) Nora Wüest	1	0	1	0	0	4	0	1	7

== Playoffs ==
Quarterfinals
1	(Switzerland) Silvana Tirinzoni	5
8	(Switzerland) Michèle Jäggi	2
4	(Switzerland) Raphaela Keiser	5
5	(South Korea) Ha Seung-youn	3
3	(Germany) Daniela Jentsch	1
6	(Canada) Clancy Grandy	6
2	(Sweden) Isabella Wranå	7
7	(Switzerland) Corrie Hürlimann	6

Semifinals
1	(Switzerland) Silvana Tirinzoni	8
4	(Switzerland) Raphaela Keiser	2
6	(Canada) Clancy Grandy	3
2	(Sweden) Isabella Wranå	4

Final
1	(Switzerland) Silvana Tirinzoni	9
2	(Sweden) Isabella Wranå	3

=== Quarterfinals ===
Saturday, January 28, 7:00 pm

Sheet 3	1	2	3	4	5	6	7	8	Final
(Switzerland) Raphaela Keiser	1	0	0	2	0	1	0	1	5
(South Korea) Ha Seung-youn	0	0	1	0	1	0	1	0	3

Sheet 4	1	2	3	4	5	6	7	8	Final
(Germany) Daniela Jentsch	0	0	0	1	X	X	X	X	1
(Canada) Clancy Grandy	1	2	3	0	X	X	X	X	6

Sheet 5	1	2	3	4	5	6	7	8	Final
(Switzerland) Silvana Tirinzoni	0	2	0	2	0	0	1	X	5
(Switzerland) Michèle Jäggi	0	0	1	0	1	0	0	X	2

Sheet 6	1	2	3	4	5	6	7	8	Final
(Sweden) Isabella Wranå	1	0	2	0	0	3	0	1	7
(Switzerland) Corrie Hürlimann	0	1	0	2	1	0	2	0	6

=== Semifinals ===
Sunday, January 29, 9:00 am

Sheet 4	1	2	3	4	5	6	7	8	Final
(Switzerland) Silvana Tirinzoni	1	0	1	0	2	4	X	X	8
(Switzerland) Raphaela Keiser	0	1	0	1	0	0	X	X	2

Sheet 5	1	2	3	4	5	6	7	8	9	Final
(Canada) Clancy Grandy	0	1	0	1	0	0	0	1	0	3
(Sweden) Isabella Wranå	1	0	1	0	0	0	1	0	1	4

=== Final ===
Sunday, January 29, 9:00 am

Sheet 5	1	2	3	4	5	6	7	8	Final
(Switzerland) Silvana Tirinzoni	2	0	2	2	0	3	X	X	9
(Sweden) Isabella Wranå	0	2	0	0	1	0	X	X	3
