= Sarah Loken =

Canadian curler (born 1999)

- Curler
- Born: November 3, 1999 (age 27); White Rock, British Columbia

Team
- Curling club: Vancouver CC, Vancouver, BC
- Mixed doubles partner: Cody Tanaka

Curling career
- Member Association: British Columbia
- Hearts: 2 (2023, 2024)
- Top CTRS ranking: 5th (2022–23)

Sarah Loken (born November 3, 1999) is a Canadian curler from Victoria, British Columbia.

== Career ==
Before joining the Sarah Daniels' Delta based rink, Loken skipped her own team of Catera Park, Kylie Karoway and Kim Bonneau. The team played in the 2016 BC junior women's championship where they made it all the way to the semifinals before losing to Team Daniels. She then joined the Daniels rink at third for the 2016–17 season. At the BC championship, the team finished second through the round robin with a 4–3 record. They then dropped the 1 vs. 2 game to Corryn Brown but were able to beat Alyssa Connell in the semifinal to qualify for the championship game. In the final, they gave up four in the fifth end, eventually losing 7–4.

The following season, the team added Kayla MacMillan to the lineup at third, shifting Loken to lead on the team. They had a successful tour season, reaching the semifinals of the Royal LePage Women's Fall Classic and the quarterfinals of the Driving Force Abbotsford Cashspiel. On the junior tour, they won the Parksville BC Junior Women's event. The team entered the BC provincial junior championship as one of the top seeds and finished first after the round robin with a 6–1 record. They then defeated Emily Bowles 11–5 in the 1 vs. 2 game to qualify for the provincial final. There, they lost 6–5 to Taylor Reese-Hansen in an extra end.

Megan Daniels aged out of juniors following the season and the team added Jessica Humphries at second. On the bonspiel circuit, they wouldn't find as much success, only reaching the playoffs once at the Challenge de Curling de Gatineau open event. They were, however, able to capture the BC junior provincial title, defeating Team Reese-Hansen 10–4 in the provincial final. This qualified them for the 2019 Canadian Junior Curling Championships where they finished 5–1 through the round robin. With a 2–2 record through the championship pool, the team was tied for third for Quebec's Laurie St-Georges, who they then beat 8–6 in the tiebreaker to qualify for the playoffs. After defeating Nova Scotia's Kaitlyn Jones 9–7 in the semifinal, they lost a tight 9–6 final to Alberta's Selena Sturmay, settling for silver. Also during the 2018–19 season, Loken was a member of the Douglas Royals rink that won a gold medal at the CCAA/Curling Canada College Curling Championships, defeating MacEwan University 7–5 in the final.

Out of juniors, Team Daniels remained intact for the 2019–20 season. On tour, the team reached the final of the King Cash Spiel but missed the playoffs in their other four events. They were able to qualify for the 2020 British Columbia Scotties Tournament of Hearts through the second open qualifier, winning 10–4 over Lindsay Hudyma. The team had a good showing at the provincial playdown, finishing 4–3 through the round robin and qualifying for the playoffs. They then beat Brette Richards 10–5 in the semifinal before losing 11–5 to Corryn Brown in the semifinal. Also this season, the Douglas Royals defended their title at the Curling Canada College Curling Championships, winning 10–1 over Humber College in the final.

After taking a season off, Loken joined Kayla MacMillan's newly formed rink of Jody Maskiewich and Lindsay Dubue for the 2021–22 season. On the tour, the team reached the final of the DeKalb Superspiel where they lost to Amber Holland. At the 2022 British Columbia Scotties Tournament of Hearts, the team qualified for the playoffs through the A Event, defeating defending champions Corryn Brown in the process. They then beat Mary-Anne Arsenault in the 1 vs. 2 game but lost to them in the provincial final 8–6, finishing in second place. They ended the season at the Best of the West event where they reached the semifinals.

For the 2022–23 season, the team added Clancy Grandy as their new skip. In their first event, they finished runner-up to Silvana Tirinzoni at the Summer Series. The following week, they defeated Team Tirinzoni in the final of the 2022 Martensville International. Later in the fall, Team Grandy competed in the 2022 Tour Challenge Tier 2 event where they went 6–1 to claim the championship title, defeating Jessie Hunkin 8–2 in the final. This qualified the team for the 2023 Canadian Open, which they had to decline their spot at to compete in their provincial championship. Back on tour, the team had a semifinal finish at the DeKalb Superspiel and the 2023 International Bernese Ladies Cup. Due to their success throughout the season, they had enough points to qualify for the 2022 Masters, where they finished 1–3. Entering the 2023 British Columbia Scotties Tournament of Hearts as the number one seed, the team lost both the A qualifier and the 1 vs. 2 game to the Corryn Brown rink. Despite this, they were able to defeat Taylor Reese-Hansen 12–4 in the semifinal to qualify for the provincial final. There, they beat Team Brown 10–9 in an extra end to claim the BC provincial title. This qualified them to represent British Columbia on home soil at the 2023 Scotties Tournament of Hearts in Kamloops. After a 5–3 round robin record, Team Grandy beat Quebec's Laurie St-Georges 8–3 in a tiebreaker to move into the championship round. There, they lost 9–4 to Manitoba's Jennifer Jones, eliminating them from contention. The team wrapped up their season at the 2023 Players' Championship and the 2023 Champions Cup Slam events. At both, they lost in tiebreakers to the Tirinzoni and Jones rinks respectively. Also during the 2022–23 season, Loken won the British Columbia Mixed Doubles provincial with partner Cody Tanaka. Representing BC at the 2023 Canadian Mixed Doubles Curling Championship, the pair finished with a 2–5 record.

Team Grandy did not find the same success during the 2023–24 season, falling from eleventh to thirty-first in the world rankings. In the fall, the team only qualified for the playoffs in four of their ten events. In their four playoff appearances, they never made it past the quarterfinal round. They also had a quarterfinal finish at the 2023 PointsBet Invitational, losing out in the Elite 8. Loken only began playing with the team in late October, however, as she was recovering from an injury. She was replaced in the lineup by Rachelle Brown until she returned for the Saville Grand Prix. In Grand Slam play, they also struggled, finishing with a 2–10 record through the three events they qualified for. In the new year, however, the team turned things around, winning the 2024 Mercure Perth Masters in the first weekend of 2024. They continued this momentum into the 2024 British Columbia Scotties Tournament of Hearts where they dominated the field, finishing the round robin a perfect 7–0. They then defeated Team Brown in both the 1 vs. 2 game and the provincial final to secure their berth at the 2024 Scotties Tournament of Hearts. At the Hearts, the team won five of their first six games to set themselves up for a playoff spot. However, they lost both of their final games to Rachel Homan and Kate Cameron respectively, finishing 5–3 and eliminating them from contention.In June 2024, Grandy announced she was stepping back from competitive curling to focus on "other opportunities", and moved to Scotland to take up a coaching job with British Curling. MacMillan would move up to skip, and add Sarah Daniels as their new third. In their first year together, Team MacMillan would fail to repeat as BC Women's champions, losing 10–7 in the final of the 2025 BC Women's Curling Championship to BC rivals Team Brown. At the end of the season, Team MacMillan would part ways with their third Sarah Daniels, and add three-time Alberta Scotties Champion Brittany Tran as third, as well as three time Scotties silver medalist and two time world junior champion Lauren Lenentine as their alternate.

Team MacMillan would have a strong start to the 2025–26 curling season, winning the 2025 Icebreaker Challenge, and qualifying for the 2025 Canadian Olympic Curling Pre-Trials. At the Pre-Trials, Team MacMillan would have a good week, but would finish in second place, losing to Selena Sturmay 2 games to 1 in the best-of-three final for the sole spot at the Canadian Olympic Trails.

== Personal life ==
Loken is formerly employed as a pharmacy technician at Macdonald's Prescriptions. She is in a relationship with fellow curler Cody Tanaka.

== Teams ==
| Season | Skip | Third | Second | Lead | Alternate |
|---|---|---|---|---|---|
| 2015–16 | Sarah Loken | Catera Park | Kylie Karoway | Kim Bonneau | |
| 2016–17 | Sarah Daniels | Sarah Loken | Megan Daniels | Sydney Brilz | |
| 2017–18 | Sarah Daniels | Kayla MacMillan | Megan Daniels | Sarah Loken | |
| 2018–19 | Sarah Daniels | Kayla MacMillan | Jessica Humphries | Sarah Loken | |
| 2019–20 | Sarah Daniels | Kayla MacMillan | Holly Horvat | Sarah Loken | |
| 2021–22 | Kayla MacMillan | Jody Maskiewich | Lindsay Dubue | Sarah Loken | |
| 2022–23 | Clancy Grandy | Kayla MacMillan | Lindsay Dubue | Sarah Loken | |
| 2023–24 | Clancy Grandy | Kayla MacMillan | Lindsay Dubue | Sarah Loken | |
| 2024–25 | Kayla MacMillan | Sarah Daniels | Lindsay Dubue | Sarah Loken | |
| 2025–26 | Kayla MacMillan | Brittany Tran | Lindsay Dubue | Sarah Loken | Lauren Lenentine |
