= Clancy Grandy =

Canadian curler (born 1990)

- Curler
- Born: Clancy Grandy; December 27, 1990 (age 35); Burlington, Ontario, Canada

Team
- Curling club: Vancouver CC; Vancouver, BC

Curling career
- Member Association: Ontario (2011–2022); Manitoba (2021); British Columbia (2022–present)
- Hearts: 3 (2021, 2023, 2024)
- Top CTRS ranking: 3rd (2016–17)
- Grand Slam victories: 1 (2016 Masters)

Clancy Grandy (born December 27, 1990, in Burlington, Ontario) is a Canadian curler originally from Ontario. She is currently a performance coach with British Curling.

== Career ==
=== Juniors ===
Grandy's junior career was highlighted by winning the 2011 Pepsi Ontario Junior Curling Championships with teammates Sarah Wilkes, Laura Crocker and Lynn Kreviazuk, defeating Jasmin Thurston in the final. The team represented Ontario at the 2011 Canadian Junior Curling Championships, where the finished with a 5–7 record.

Later that season, Grandy skipped the Guelph Gryphons University curling team at the 2011 CIS/CCA Curling Championships, finishing with a 2–5 record. Laura Crocker, her junior teammate won the event as the skip for the Wilfrid Laurier Golden Hawks. Grandy skipped Guelph at the 2012 CIS/CCA Curling Championships as well, finishing 3–4, with Crocker's Laurier rink winning again. After playing in university curling, Grandy would play on the college level at Humber College.

=== Women's ===
After juniors, Grandy would play lead for Laura Crocker's women's team. Crocker would move to Alberta in 2012, forcing the team to disband. Grandy played in the 2014 Canadian Mixed Doubles Curling Trials with teammate Patrick Janssen. After posting a 4–3 record in their group, they lost their first playoff game in the Round of 12. In 2014, Grandy formed her own women's rink with teammates Janet Murphy, Melissa Foster and Nicole Westlund. That season, Grandy would qualify for her first provincial women's championship, the 2015 Ontario Scotties Tournament of Hearts. The team had a successful week but lost the semi-final to Sherry Middaugh.

For the 2015–16 season, Grandy played third on team Allison Flaxey with Lynn Kreviazuk playing second and Morgan Court playing lead. The team qualified for the 2016 Ontario Scotties Tournament of Hearts, but finished with a 3–6 record. However, they did win a World Curling Tour event that season, winning the KW Fall Classic. The next season, Grandy won her first Grand Slam of Curling event, the 2016 WFG Masters. The team had enough points to qualify for the 2017 Ontario Scotties Tournament of Hearts through the CTRS Leaders, but they lost the tiebreaker to Cathy Auld 10–4.

Team Flaxey qualified for the 2017 Canadian Olympic Curling Trials as they were ranked third on the CTRS standings for the 2016–17 season. At the trials, they finished in last place with a 1–7 record, only beating Julie Tippin in the final round robin draw. The team lost all three qualifiers at the 2018 Ontario Scotties Tournament of Hearts and did not qualify for the playoffs.

For the 2018–19 season, Grandy stayed with Kreviazuk and Court but would bring on Jacqueline Harrison at skip as Flaxey moved back to Manitoba. The team played in the 2018 National Grand Slam where they lost in the quarterfinals to Rachel Homan. At provincials, the team struggled and ended up missing the playoffs with a 3–4 record.

On April 2, 2020, it was announced that Grandy and Court would rejoin Flaxey and would bring on Kaitlyn Jones to skip them for the 2019–20 season. The team did not have a great season, failing to win any tour events and not qualifying for the provincial championship. The team disbanded after just one season.

Grandy competed at the 2021 Scotties Tournament of Hearts, her first Canadian women's curling championship, as alternate for the Tracy Fleury rink skipped by Chelsea Carey as Fleury elected to stay home due to family commitments and the ongoing COVID-19 pandemic in Canada. At the Hearts, Carey led the team to a 6–6 eighth-place finish. Grandy played in one end of the tournament, the eighth end against Newfoundland and Labrador's Sarah Hill where they stole four en route to an 11–2 victory.

For the 2022–23 season, Grandy moved to Coquitlam, British Columbia and joined the Kayla MacMillan rink out of British Columbia as their new skip. The team also included Lindsay Dubue and Sarah Loken. In their first event, the team finished runner-up to Silvana Tirinzoni at the Summer Series. The following week, they defeated Team Tirinzoni in the final of the 2022 Martensville International. Later in the fall, Team Grandy competed in the 2022 Tour Challenge Tier 2 event where they went 6–1 to claim the championship title, defeating Jessie Hunkin 8–2 in the final. This qualified the team for the 2023 Canadian Open, which they had to decline their spot at to compete in their provincial championship. Back on tour, the team had a semifinal finish at the DeKalb Superspiel and the 2023 International Bernese Ladies Cup. Due to their success throughout the season, they had enough points to qualify for the 2022 Masters, where they finished 1–3. Entering the 2023 British Columbia Scotties Tournament of Hearts as the number one seed, the team lost both the A qualifier and the 1 vs. 2 game to the Corryn Brown rink. Despite this, they were able to defeat Taylor Reese-Hansen 12–4 in the semifinal to qualify for the provincial final. There, they beat Team Brown 10–9 in an extra end to claim the BC provincial title. This qualified them to represent British Columbia on home soil at the 2023 Scotties Tournament of Hearts in Kamloops. After a 5–3 round robin record, Team Grandy beat Quebec's Laurie St-Georges 8–3 in a tiebreaker to move into the championship round. There, they lost 9–4 to Manitoba's Jennifer Jones, eliminating them from contention. The team wrapped up their season at the 2023 Players' Championship and the 2023 Champions Cup Slam events. At both, they lost in tiebreakers to the Tirinzoni and Jones rinks respectively. Also during the 2022–23 season, Grandy competed at the 2023 Canadian Mixed Doubles Curling Championship with partner John Morris. There, the team missed the playoffs with a 3–4 record.

Team Grandy did not find the same success during the 2023–24 season, falling from eleventh to thirty-first in the world rankings. In the fall, the team only qualified for the playoffs in four of their ten events. In their four playoff appearances, they never made it past the quarterfinal round. They also had a quarterfinal finish at the 2023 PointsBet Invitational, losing out in the Elite 8. In Grand Slam play, they also struggled, finishing with a 2–10 record through the three events they qualified for. In the new year, however, the team turned things around, winning the 2024 Mercure Perth Masters in the first weekend of 2024. They continued this momentum into the 2024 British Columbia Scotties Tournament of Hearts where they dominated the field, finishing the round robin a perfect 7–0. They then defeated Team Brown in both the 1 vs. 2 game and the provincial final to secure their berth at the 2024 Scotties Tournament of Hearts. At the Hearts, the team won five of their first six games to set themselves up for a playoff spot. However, they lost both of their final games to Rachel Homan and Kate Cameron respectively, finishing 5–3 and eliminating them from contention.

In June 2024, she announced she was stepping back from competitive curling to focus on "other opportunities". In August, it was announced she had moved to Scotland and took up a coaching job with British Curling.

== Personal life ==
Grandy is formerly employed as a fascial stretch therapist at Rebound Sport & Spine. She is engaged to fellow curler Robin Brydone, and was previously married to fellow curler Patrick Janssen. She also coached the Jaap van Dorp rink from the Netherlands.

Grandy currently resides in Muthill, Scotland.

== Grand Slam record ==
Key
C	Champion
F	Lost in Final
SF	Lost in Semifinal
QF	Lost in Quarterfinals
R16	Lost in the round of 16
Q	Did not advance to playoffs
T2	Played in Tier 2 event
DNP	Did not participate in event
N/A	Not a Grand Slam event that season

Event	2015–16	2016–17	2017–18	2018–19	2019–20	2020–21	2021–22	2022–23	2023–24
Tour Challenge	DNP	SF	Q	T2	DNP	N/A	N/A	T2	Q
The National	DNP	Q	Q	QF	DNP	N/A	DNP	DNP	Q
Masters	DNP	C	Q	DNP	DNP	N/A	DNP	Q	Q
Canadian Open	DNP	QF	QF	DNP	DNP	N/A	N/A	DNP	DNP
Players'	DNP	Q	DNP	DNP	N/A	DNP	DNP	Q	DNP
Champions Cup	Q	Q	DNP	DNP	N/A	DNP	DNP	Q	N/A
