= List of teams in the 2025–26 curling season =

This is a list of the top men's, women's and mixed doubles curling teams of the 2025–26 curling season, sorted by their end of season World Curling ranking.

This list shows the team lineups, their playdown record (provincial or regional championships, national or continental qualifiers), national championship record, world championship record, Olympics record, Grand Slam record (men's and women's only), and other tour events won, plus their end of season World Curling ranking points.

== Men's ==
Team					Playdown record	National championship record	World championship record	Olympics record	Grand Slam record					Other event wins	World Curling team ranking	Points
Skip	Third	Second	Lead	Club/locale	Playdown record	National championship record	World championship record	Olympics record	Mast.	TC	Tahoe	CO	PC	Other event wins	World Curling team ranking	Points
Bruce Mouat	Grant Hardie	Bobby Lammie	Hammy McMillan Jr.	Curl Edinburgh, Edinburgh, Scotland	(bronze) 10–1 (ECC)	–	–	(silver) 6–5	SF	C	C	SF	Q	Western Showdown, Euro Super Series	1st	465.850
Brad Jacobs	Marc Kennedy	Brett Gallant	Ben Hebert	The Glencoe Club, Calgary, Alberta	(gold) 8–1 (COCT); (gold) 9–0 (PCCC)	(silver) 9–2 (Brier)	–	(gold) 9–2	SF	DNP	SF	QF	Q	Okotoks Classic	2nd	444.850
Matt Dunstone	Colton Lott	E. J. Harnden	Ryan Harnden	Granite CC, Winnipeg, Manitoba	(silver) 5–5 (COCT)	(gold) 10–2 (Brier)	(silver) 12–3	–	C	F	F	Q	Q	PointsBet Invitational	3rd	422.000
Benoît Schwarz-van Berkel	Yannick Schwaller (skip)	Sven Michel	Pablo Lachat-Couchepin	CC Genève, Geneva, Switzerland	(silver) 8–3 (ECC)	(silver) 9–3 (SUI)	–	(bronze) 10–1	QF	QF	SF	C	SF	Trentino World Cup	4th	411.850
Ross Whyte	Robin Brydone	Duncan McFadzean	Euan Kyle	The Peak (Stirling), Stirling, Scotland	–	(gold) 5–1 (SCO)	(bronze) 11–3	–	F	Q	QF	F	C	Stu Sells Oakville Tankard, Perth Masters	5th	373.750
John Shuster (Note: Shuster did not play in the Oslo Cup. Instead, the team played with three players, with Plys skipping)	Chris Plys	Colin Hufman	Matt Hamilton	(United States) Duluth CC, Duluth, Minnesota	(gold) 4–0 (PCQ); (silver) 7–2 (PCCC); (silver) 7–2 (USOCT)	(gold) 9–1 (USA)	4th 9–6	–	T2	DNP	DNP	SF	QF	Oslo Cup	6th	277.950
Danny Casper (Note: Casper did not play in the Henderson Metal Fall Classic as he was the alternate for Team Shuster at the 2025 Pan Continental Curling Championships. He was replaced by Rich Ruohonen.)	Luc Violette	Ben Richardson	Aidan Oldenburg	(United States) Chaska CC, Chaska, Minnesota	(silver) 0–4 (PCQ); (gold) 6–3 (USOCT); (gold) 7–1 (OQE)	–	–	5th 4–5	T2	DNP	DNP	Q	Q	Henderson Metal Fall Classic, Masters Tier 2	7th	277.800
Niklas Edin	Oskar Eriksson	Rasmus Wranå	Christoffer Sundgren	Karlstads CK, Karlstad, Sweden	(gold) 8–3 (ECC)	–	(gold) 12–2	9th 2–7	Q	QF	Q	Q	Q	–	8th	275.925
Joël Retornaz	Amos Mosaner	Sebastiano Arman	Mattia Giovanella	Trentino Curling Cembra, Cembra, Italy	4th 6–5 (ECC)	–	5th 8–5 (Note: Only Mosaner and Arman played in the World Championship (Giovanella was the alternate), and as a result their record at Worlds did not go toward their team's points. At the World Championship, Stefano Spiller skipped the team with Alberto Pimpini playing lead)	6th 4–5	QF	SF	Q	QF	QF	KW Fall Classic	9th	271.050
John Epping	Jacob Horgan	Tanner Horgan	Ian McMillan	Northern Credit Union CC, Sudbury, Ontario	5th 3–4 (COCT); (silver) 4–1 (NO)	–	–	–	QF	SF	QF	Q	DNP	Shorty Jenkins Classic	10th	249.900
Kyle Waddell	Mark Watt	Angus Bryce	Blair Haswell	Lanarkshire Ice Rink, Hamilton, Scotland	–	(silver) 3–2 (SCO)	–	–	T2	QF	QF	Q	F	–	11th	238.850
Magnus Ramsfjell	Martin Sesaker	Bendik Ramsfjell	Gaute Nepstad	Trondheim CK, Trondheim, Norway	8th 2–7 (ECC)	(gold) 5–1 (NOR)	–	4th 5–6	QF	DNP	DNP	T2	DNP	Canadian Open Tier 2	12th	229.850
Xu Xiaoming (Note: At the 2026 World Championships, Xu Xiaoming was the team's alternate, Fei skipped, Yu Sen played second, Wang Zhenhao played lead and Xu Jingtao was absent)	Fei Xueqing	Li Zhichao	Xu Jingtao	Beijing, China	(silver) 7–2 (OQE); 4th 4–5 (PCCC)		7th 9–6	10th 2–7	Q	DNP	Q	T2	SF	–	13th	218.950
Philipp Hösli	Marco Hösli (skip)	Simon Gloor	Justin Hausherr	CC Glarus, Glarus, Switzerland	–	(gold) 8–4 (SUI)	5th 9–4	–	Q	Q	Q	Q	DNP	Baden Masters	14th	194.663
Mike McEwen	Colton Flasch	Kevin Marsh	Dan Marsh	Nutana CC, Saskatoon, Saskatchewan	(bronze) 5–3 (COCT)	8th 5–3 (Brier)	–	–	Q	Q	QF	Q	Q	–	15th	182.775
Riku Yanagisawa	Tsuyoshi Yamaguchi (skip)	Takeru Yamamoto	Satoshi Koizumi	SC Karuizawa Club, Karuizawa, Japan	(gold) 3–1 (JOCT); (bronze) 5–3 (OQE); (bronze) 6–3 (PCCC)	(gold) 7–3 (JPN)	5–7 8th	–	DNP	DNP	DNP	T2	DNP	Advics Cup, Major Welding Abbotsford Cashspiel	16th	178.600
Evan van Amsterdam	Jeremy Harty	Jason Ginter	Parker Konschuh	Saville Community SC, Edmonton, Alberta	4th 3–3 (AB)	–	–	–	DNP	DNP	DNP	DNP	DNP	Red Deer Curling Classic	17th	176.500
Kevin Koe	Tyler Tardi	Aaron Sluchinski	Karrick Martin	The Glencoe Club, Calgary, Alberta	6th 3–4 (COCT); (gold) 5–0 (AB)	(silver) 10–1 (Brier)	–	–	T2	Q	DNP	T2	DNP	–	18th	169.800
Marc Muskatewitz	Benny Kapp	Felix Messenzehl	Johannes Scheuerl	CC Füssen, Füssen, Germany	5th 6–3 (ECC)	–	9th 4–8	7th 4–5	Q	Q	Q	QF	DNP	–	19th	160.475
Jayden King	Dylan Niepage	Owen Henry	Victor Pietrangelo	Tillsonburg CC, Tillsonburg, Ontario	(gold) 5–1 (ON)	6th 5–4 (Brier)	–	–	T2	DNP	DNP	DNP	DNP	–	20th	158.250
Jordon McDonald	Jacques Gauthier	Elias Huminicki	Cameron Olafson	Assiniboine Memorial CC, Winnipeg, Manitoba	(gold) 8–3 (COCPT); 8th 1–6 (COCT); (silver) 5–2 (MB)	–	–	–	T2	DNP	Q	T2	DNP	Ed Werenich Golden Wrench Classic, Martensville International, U25 NextGen Classic (2026)	21st	154.050
Kim Schwaller	Marco Hefti	Felix Eberhard	Yves Stocker (skip)	CC Oberwallis, Brig-Glis, Switzerland	–	(bronze) 5–4 (SUI)	–	–	DNP	DNP	DNP	DNP	DNP	–	22nd	145.025
Braden Calvert	Corey Chambers	Kyle Kurz	Brendan Bilawka	Heather CC, Winnipeg, Manitoba	(silver) 6–4 (COCPT); (gold) 6–1 (MB)	5th 5–4 (Brier)	–	–	DNP	DNP	DNP	DNP	DNP	DeKalb Superspiel, MCT Challenge, Mother Club Fall Curling Classic	23rd	144.000
Brad Gushue	Mark Nichols	Brendan Bottcher	Geoff Walker	St. John's CC, St. John's, Newfoundland and Labrador	4th 4–3 (COCT)	4th 9–2 (Brier)	–	–	Q	QF	DNP	QF	DNP	–	24th	143.000
Sam Mooibroek	Ryan Wiebe	Scott Mitchell	Nathan Steele	Whitby CC, Whitby, Ontario	6th 3–4 (COCPT); (silver) 5–2 (ON)	–	–	–	T2	DNP	DNP	T2	DNP	U25 NextGen Classic (2025), Stu Sells Brantford Nissan Classic	25th	139.025
Cameron Bryce	Duncan Menzies	Scott Hyslop	Robin McCall	Kinross Curling, Kinross, Scotland	–	–	–	–	T2	DNP	DNP	DNP	DNP	Swiss Cup Basel, Match Town Trophy	26th	138.200
Lukáš Klíma	Marek Černovský	Martin Jurík (Note: Jurík played lead and Klípa played second at the Czech Championship)	Lukáš Klípa	CC Zbraslav, Prague, Czech Republic	6th 4–5 (ECC)	(gold) 7–3 (CZE)	11th 3–9	8th 3–6	T2	DNP	DNP	T2	DNP	–	27th	136.625
Wouter Gösgens	Laurens Hoekman	Jaap van Dorp	Tobias van den Hurk	Zoetermeer, Netherlands	5th 3–4 (OQE)		–	–	DNP	DNP	DNP	DNP	DNP	Grand Prix Bern Inter, Saville Grand Prix, Crestwood Anniversary Showdown	28th	134.000
Takumi Maeda	Hiroki Maeda	Uryu Kamikawa	Gakuto Tokoro	Loco Solare, Kitami, Japan	–	(silver) 6–3 (JPN)	–	–	T2	DNP	DNP	T2	DNP	Grand Slam Tour Challenge U25, Wakkanai Midori Challenge Cup, Argo Graphics Cup	29th	131.300
Rylan Kleiter	Joshua Mattern	Matthew Hall	Trevor Johnson	Nutana CC, Saskatoon, Saskatchewan	7th 2–5 (COCT); (silver) 9–2 (SK)	–	–	–	Q	Q	Q	Q	DNP	–	30th	123.900
Mark Kean	Brady Lumley	Matthew Garner	Spencer Dunlop	Woodstock CC, Woodstock, Ontario	8th 0–7 (COCPT); (bronze) 5–3 (ON)	–	–	–	DNP	DNP	DNP	T2	DNP	Stu Sells Toronto Tankard, Broken Broom Tobacco Belt Cash Spiel	31st	122.963
Reid Carruthers (Note: Carruthers did not play at the Nufloors Penticton Classic. At that event, Neufeld skipped, Schneider played third and Kyle Doering played second)	B. J. Neufeld	Catlin Schneider	Connor Njegovan	Granite CC, Winnipeg, Manitoba	5th 3–3 (MB)	–	–	–	T2	Q	DNP	T2	DNP	Nufloors Penticton Classic	32nd	120.413
Michael Brunner	Anthony Petoud	Romano Keller-Meier	Andreas Gerlach	CC Bern Zähringer, Bern, Switzerland	–	5th 4–3 (SUI)	–	–	T2	DNP	DNP	T2	DNP	St. Galler Elite Challenge	33rd	112.363
Stefano Spiller	Stefano Gilli	Andrea Gilli	Cesare Spiller	ASC Curling Suedtirol Bruneck, Bruneck, Italy	(gold) 4–1 (INQ)	(gold) 5–0 (ITA)	–	–	DNP	DNP	DNP	DNP	DNP	Sun City Cup, Danish Open	34th	111.900
Samuel Strouse	Kevin Tuma (Note: Sinnett did not play at the US Championships. There, Tuma skipped the team while remaining at third. Sinnett was replaced by Coleman Thurston at second)	Chase Sinnett (skip)	Connor Kauffman	Chaska, Minnesota, United States	(silver) 2–2 (USOCTPT)	(bronze) 6–3 (USA)	–	–	DNP	DNP	DNP	DNP	DNP	Icebreaker Challenge	35th	109.675
Orrin Carson	Logan Carson	Archie Hyslop	Charlie Gibb	Dumfries Ice Bowl, Dumfries, Scotland	–	–	–	–	DNP	DNP	DNP	DNP	DNP	Take-Out Trophy, Scottish Junior Championships	36th	109.250
Kelly Knapp	Brennen Jones	Dustin Kidby	Mat Ring	Highland CC, Regina, Saskatchewan	(gold) 9–1 (SK)	10th 3–5 (Brier)	–	–	DNP	DNP	DNP	T2	DNP	SaskTour Tier 2 Grand Slam Qualifier, Regina Highland Rocktoberfest, S3 Group Curling Stadium Series, Moose Jaw SaskTour Spiel	37th	107.950
Max Winz	Jan Iseli (skip)	Sandro Fanchini	Tom Winkelhausen	CC Solothurn Regio, Solothurn, Switzerland	–	4th 4–4 (SUI)	–	–	DNP	DNP	DNP	DNP	DNP	–	38th	106.038
Kim Soo-hyuk (Note: Kim Soo-hyuk could not play in the World Championships due to an undisclosed injury. The team played with three players at the event with Kim Chang-min skipping)	Kim Chang-min	Yoo Min-hyeon	Kim Hak-kyun	Uiseong CC, Uiseong-eup, South Korea	5th 3–4 (PCCC); 4th 3–4 (OQE)	(gold) 9–2 (KOR)	10th 3–9	–	DNP	DNP	DNP	DNP	DNP	–	39th	103.138
Matthew Blandford	Sébastien Robillard	Cody Johnston	Matthew Fenton	Royal City CC, New Westminster, British Columbia	T5th 3–3 (BC)	–	–	–	DNP	DNP	DNP	DNP	DNP	King Cash Spiel	40th	99.413
Scott Howard	Mathew Camm	Jason Camm	Scott Chadwick	Navan CC, Navan, Ontario	(bronze) 4–4 (COCPT); 4th 4–3 (ON)	–	–	–	T2	DNP	DNP	DNP	DNP	Stu Sells Living Waters Collingwood Classic	41st	98.125
Cameron de Jong	Sterling Middleton	Alex Horvath	Corey Chester	Victoria CC, Victoria, British Columbia	T5th 3–3 (BC)	–	–	–	DNP	DNP	DNP	DNP	DNP	Saville Shootout	42nd	97.100
Caden Hebert	Jackson Bestland	Benji Paral	Jack Wendtland	(United States) Eau Claire, Wisconsin	(gold) 3–1 (USOCTPT); 4th 0–6 (USOCT)	–	–	–	DNP	DNP	DNP	DNP	DNP	St. Paul Cash Spiel, World Junior Championships, United States Junior Championships, Rice Lake Competitor Spiel, World Junior-B Championships	43rd	96.925
Fredrik Nyman	Patric Mabergs	Simon Olofsson	Johannes Patz	Sollefteå CK, Sollefteå, Sweden	(gold) 13–0 (SES)	(gold) 7–0 (SWE)	–	–	DNP	DNP	DNP	DNP	DNP	Tallinn Mens Challenger	44th	96.025
Korey Dropkin (Note: Dropkin left the team in November to focus on representing the US in mixed doubles at the 2026 Olympics. He was replaced as skip by Stopera. Fenner moved to second and Lance Wheeler played lead.)	Thomas Howell	Andrew Stopera	Mark Fenner	(United States) Duluth CC, Duluth, Minnesota	(bronze) 2–4 (USOCT); (silver) 2–2 (PCQ)	(silver) 7–2 (USA)	–	–	Q	Q	DNP	T2	DNP	–	45th	95.350
Johnson Tao	Kenan Wipf	Ben Morin	Andrew Nowell	Saville Community SC, Edmonton, Alberta	(silver) 6–3 (AB)	–	–	–	DNP	DNP	DNP	DNP	DNP	Original 16 Tour Bonspiel	46th	93.638
Félix Asselin	Jean-Michel Ménard (skip)	Martin Crête	Jean-François Trépanier	Glenmore CC, Dollard-des-Ormeaux / Curling des Collines, Chelsea / CC Etchemin, Saint-Romuald / CS Belvédère, Val-d'Or, CC Valleyfield, Salaberry-de-Valleyfield, Quebec	5th 4–3 (COCPT); (gold) 12–0 (QC)	7th 5–3 (Brier)	–	–	DNP	DNP	DNP	DNP	DNP	Invitation Valleyfield, Finale du Circuit, Charlevoix Challenge Desjardins, Vic Open	47th	92.475
Tetsuro Shimizu	Shinya Abe (skip)	Hayato Sato (Note: Sato and Ouchi switched positions at the 2026 Japan Championships)	Haruto Ouchi	Hokkaido Consadole Sapporo, Kitami, Japan	(silver) 1–3 (JOCT)	4th 5–3 (JPN)	–	–	T2	DNP	DNP	DNP	DNP	Hokkaido Bank Classic, Duluth Cash Spiel, Karuizawa International	48th	91.825
Andreas Hårstad	Willhelm Næss	Michael Mellemseter	Mathias Brænden	Oppdal CK, Oppdal, Norway	–	(silver) 5–1 (NOR)	13th 0–12	–	DNP	DNP	DNP	DNP	DNP	–	49th	79.463
Dustin Kalthoff (Note: Pierce did not play at the Canadian Open Tier 2 event. There, Kalthoff skipped the team, while Heidt played third, and Jason Jacobson played second.)	Brent Pierce (skip)	Josh Heidt	Logan Ede	Nutana CC, Saskatoon, Saskatchewan	8th 2–6 (SK)	–	–	–	DNP	DNP	DNP	T2	DNP	–	50th	73.000

== Women's ==
Team					Playdown record	National championship record	World championship record	Olympics record	Grand Slam record					Other event wins	World Curling team ranking	Points
Skip	Third	Second	Lead	Club/locale	Playdown record	National championship record	World championship record	Olympics record	Mast.	TC	Tahoe	CO	PC	Other event wins	World Curling team ranking	Points
Alina Pätz	Silvana Tirinzoni (skip)	Carole Howald	Selina Witschonke	CC Aarau, Aarau, Switzerland	–	(silver) 5–2 (SUI)	–	(silver) 7–4	F	F	F	C	C	Western Showdown, Red Deer Classic, International Bernese Ladies Cup, Women's Masters Basel	1st	505.100
Rachel Homan	Tracy Fleury	Emma Miskew	Sarah Wilkes	Ottawa CC, Ottawa, Ontario	(gold) 8–1 (COCT); (silver) 6–3 (PCCC)	–	–	(bronze) 7–4	C	C	C	QF	SF	PointsBet Invitational	2nd	499.550
Anna Hasselborg	Sara McManus	Agnes Knochenhauer	Sofia Scharback	Sundbybergs CK, Sundbyberg, Sweden	(gold) 10–1 (ECC)	–	–	(gold) 9–2	QF	SF	SF	Q	Q	Karuizawa International	3rd	354.100
Xenia Schwaller	Selina Gafner	Fabienne Rieder	Selina Rychiger	Grasshopper Club Zurich, Zurich, Switzerland	–	(gold) 6–2 (SUI)	(gold) 13–1	–	QF	SF	SF	Q	Q	Shorty Jenkins Classic, Oslo Cup, Take-Out Trophy	4th	342.750
Kerri Einarson	Val Sweeting	Shannon Birchard	Karlee Burgess	Gimli CC, Gimli, Manitoba	(bronze) 6–2 (COCT)	(gold) 10–2 (STOH)	(silver) 11–3	–	Q	QF	Q	QF	F	Saville Shootout	5th	339.850
Gim Eun-ji	Kim Min-ji	Kim Su-ji	Seol Ye-eun	Uijeongbu CC, Uijeongbu, South Korea	(bronze) 5–4 (PCCC)	(gold) 9–2 (KOR)	T5th 8–5	5th 5–4	SF	QF	QF	Q	SF	Autumn Gold Curling Classic	6th	321.763
Satsuki Fujisawa	Chinami Yoshida	Yumi Suzuki	Yurika Yoshida	Loco Solare, Kitami, Japan	5th 4–3 (PCCC); (bronze) 2–3 (JOCT)	9th 1–3 (JPN)	4th 10–5	–	Q	Q	QF	F	QF	Wakkanai Midori Challenge Cup, Advics Cup	7th	266.975
Ha Seung-youn	Kim Hye-rin	Yang Tae-i	Kim Su-jin	Chuncheon City Hall, Chuncheon, South Korea	–	(silver) 8–2 (KOR)	–	–	Q	Q	Q	QF	DNP	Stu Sells Oakville Tankard, Stu Sells Toronto Tankard	8th	260.725
Tabitha Peterson	Cory Thiesse	Tara Peterson	Taylor Anderson-Heide	(United States) Chaska, Minnesota	(gold) 3–2 (PCQ); 4th 5–4 (PCCC); (gold) 7–1 (USOCT); (silver) 6–2 (OQE)	–	–	4th 6–5	T2	DNP	DNP	DNP	QF	Euro Super Series	9th	252.025
Isabella Wranå	Almida de Val	Maria Larsson	Linda Stenlund	Sundbybergs CK, Sundbyberg & Östersunds CK, Östersund, Sweden	–	–	(bronze) 10–5	–	SF	QF	Q	T2	QF	–	10th	249.175
Momoha Tabata (Note: Tabata and Nihira switched positions at the Japanese Championship)	Miku Nihira	Sae Yamamoto	Mikoto Nakajima	Hokkaido Bank, Sapporo, Japan	–	(silver) 8–2 (JPN)	–	–	QF	Q	Q	SF	Q	–	11th	233.400
Sayaka Yoshimura	Kaho Onodera	Yuna Kotani	Anna Ohmiya	Fortius, Sapporo, Japan (JOCT)	(gold) 5–4 (JOCT); (gold) 7–1 (OQE)	(bronze) 5–4 (JPN)	–	8th 2–7	Q	Q	QF	SF	Q	Hokkaido Bank Classic	12th	232.775
Madeleine Dupont	Mathilde Halse	Jasmin Holtermann (Note: Neither Holtermann nor Denise Dupont could play in the World Championships. Katrine Schmidt played second on the team there. Holtermann did not play at the Canadian Open, the Perth Masters, the Sundbyberg Open, or the Tallinn Ladies Challenger, with Denise Dupont throwing second in her stead)	Denise Dupont (Note: My Larsen was the team's lead at the Danish Championship, at the World Championships, the Canadian Open, the Perth Masters, the Sundbyberg Open and the Tallinn Ladies Challenger)	Hvidovre CC, Hvidovre & Gentofte CC, Gentofte, Denmark	5th 5–4 (ECC)	(gold) 5–0 (DEN)	11th 3–9	7th 4–5	T2	DNP	DNP	T2	DNP	Sun City Cup, Perth Masters, Sundbyberg Open, Tallinn Ladies Challenger	13th	211.600
Wang Rui (Note: Wang skipped and threw third stones at the World Championships with Han throwing fourth stones)	Han Yu	Dong Ziqi	Jiang Jiayi	Beijing, China	(gold) 9–0 (PCCC)		7th 6–6	10th 2–7	Q	DNP	Q	QF	DNP	–	14th	201.575
Kang Bo-bae	Shim Yu-jeong	Kim Min-seo (Note: Replaced by Lee Bo-young at World Juniors)	Kim Ji-soo (Note: Replaced by Lee You-sun at World Juniors)	(South Korea) Jeonbuk Province	–	(bronze) 7–3 (KOR)	–	–	DNP	DNP	QF	Q	DNP	World Junior Championships	15th	193.925
Kaitlyn Lawes	Selena Njegovan (skip)	Jocelyn Peterman	Kristin Gordon	Heather CC, Winnipeg, Manitoba	5th 4–3 (COCT); (silver) 7–1 (MB)	(silver) 10–1 (STOH)	–	–	T2	Q	Q	T2	DNP	Saville Grand Prix	16th	191.050
Ikue Kitazawa	Seina Nakajima	Minori Suzuki	Hasumi Ishigooka	Chubu Electric Power, Nagano, Japan	–	4–4 4th (JPN)	–	–	T2	DNP	Q	Q	Q	Masters Tier 2, North Grenville Women's Fall Classic, King Cash Spiel	17th	189.525
Rebecca Morrison	Jennifer Dodds	Sophie Sinclair	Sophie Jackson (skip)	Stirling, Scotland	(silver) 6–5 (ECC)	–	–	6th 5–4	T2	DNP	Q	Q	DNP	–	18th	179.738
Taylor Reese-Hansen	Megan McGillivray	Kim Bonneau	Julianna Mackenzie	Victoria CC, Victoria, British Columbia	(gold) 8–1 (BC)	11th 3–5 (STOH)	–	–	DNP	DNP	DNP	T2	DNP	Canadian Open Tier 2, Lloydminster SaskTour Spiel	19th	172.050
Serena Gray-Withers	Catherine Clifford	Lindsey Burgess	Zoe Cinnamon	Saville Community SC, Edmonton, Alberta	(silver) 4–1 (AB)	–	–	–	DNP	DNP	DNP	T2	DNP	U25 NextGen Classic, Grand Slam Tour Challenge U25, McKee Homes Fall Classic, Saville U25 Challenge	20th	167.725
Christina Black	Jill Brothers	Jennifer Baxter (Note: Replaced by Marlee Powers at Tour Challenge and Canadian Open Tier 2) (Note: The team employed a three-player front-end rotation at the Scotties with Marlee Powers in addition to Baxter and Everist)	Karlee Everist	Halifax CC, Halifax, Nova Scotia	(silver) 5–5 (COCT)	4th 7–4 (STOH)	–	–	Q	Q	DNP	T2	DNP	Stu Sells 1824 Halifax Classic	21st	156.888
Miyu Ueno	Yui Ueno	Junko Nishimuro (Note: Replaced by Yuina Miura at Olympic Trials. Did not play in Japanese Championship (Kanai played second) or at the Canadian Open Tier 2 or the Crestwood Anniversary Showdown (team played with three players))	Asuka Kanai (Note: Played second at Japanese Championship, while Ai Kawata played lead.)	SC Karuizawa Club, Karuizawa, Japan	(silver) 4–5 (JOCT)	(gold) 8–1 (JPN)	–	–	DNP	DNP	DNP	T2	DNP	DeKalb Superspiel, Crestwood Anniversary Showdown, Kamloops Crown of Curling	22nd	143.450
Kayla MacMillan	Brittany Tran	Lindsay Dubue	Sarah Loken (Note: Loken and Lenentine alternated playing lead. Loken was the lead at the Pre-Trials and Masters Tier 2, while Lenentine was the lead at the BC Championships, Canadian Open Tier 2 and Icebreaker Challenge); Lauren Lenentine	Victoria CC, Victoria, British Columbia	(silver) 7–4 (COCPT) (bronze) 6–2 (BC)	–	–	–	T2	DNP	DNP	T2	DNP	Icebreaker Challenge	23rd	134.738
Torild Bjørnstad	Nora Østgård	Ingeborg Forbregd	Eirin Mesloe	Oppdal CK, Oppdal, Norway	–	(silver) 4–1 (NOR)	9th 4–8	–	DNP	DNP	DNP	DNP	DNP	Match Town Trophy	24th	133.250
Park You-been	Lee Eun-chae	Kim Ji-yoon	Yang Sueng-hee	Seoul City Hall, Seoul, South Korea	–	5th 4–4 (KOR)	–	–	DNP	DNP	DNP	T2	DNP	–	25th	130.075
Selena Sturmay	Danielle Schmiemann	Dezaray Hawes	Paige Papley	Saville Community SC, Edmonton, Alberta	(gold) 7–3 (COCPT); 4th 4–3 (COCT); (gold) 6–2 (AB)	(bronze) 8–3 (STOH)	–	–	DNP	DNP	DNP	DNP	DNP	–	26th	130.050
Stefania Constantini	Elena Mathis (Note: Team Constatini employed a 4-player rotation for the beginning of the season, with Mathis Lo Deserto, Lacedelli and Angela Romei rotating positions. Prior to the Olympics, Romei was replaced on the team by Rebecca Mariani, who became the team's alternate. The team order presented here was the team at the Olympics. Mathis played second at the World Championships, Masters and Tour Championship; Lo Deseroto played lead at the Worlds, Masters and Tour Championship; Lacedelli played third at the World Championships, Masters and Tour Challenge; Romei played second at the Italian Championship, European Championship and Canadian Open.)	Marta Lo Deserto	Giulia Zardini Lacedelli	CC Dolomiti, Cortina d'Ampezzo, Italy	7th 4–5 (ECC)	(gold) 4–0 (ITA)	8th 5–7	9th 2–7	Q	QF	DNP	Q	DNP	–	27th	128.875
Corrie Hürlimann	Marina Lörtscher	Stefanie Berset	Celine Schwizgebel	CC Zug Zug, Switzerland	(bronze) 7–4 (ECC)	(bronze) 2–3 (SUI)	–	–	T2	DNP	DNP	DNP	DNP	–	28th	125.975
Kristin Skaslien	Marianne Rørvik (skip)	Mille Haslev Nordbye	Eilin Kjærland	Lillehammer CK, Lillehammer, Norway	4th 5–6 (ECC); (bronze) 6–3 (OQE)	(gold) 5–0 (NOR)	–	–	DNP	DNP	DNP	DNP	DNP	Danish Open	29th	125.575
Corryn Brown	Erin Pincott	Sarah Koltun	Samantha Fisher	Kamloops CC, Kamloops, British Columbia	8th 1–6 (COCT); (silver) 6–2 (BC)	–	–	–	T2	DNP	DNP	T2	DNP	SaskTour Tier 2 Grand Slam Qualifier	30th	119.276
Kelsey Calvert (Note: The team began the season with Peterson skipping and Calvert at third, but the two switched positions prior to the RME Berth Bonspiel in November.)	Beth Peterson	Katherine Remillard	Melissa Gordon-Kurz	Assiniboine Memorial CC, Winnipeg, Manitoba	8th 2–5 (COCPT); (gold) 8–2 (MB)	5th 8–2 (STOH)	–	–	T2	DNP	DNP	DNP	DNP	RME Berth Bonspiel	31st	117.738
Dilşat Yıldız	Öznur Polat	İclal Karaman (Note: İfayet Şafak Çalıkuşu replaced Karaman at the Prague Ladies International)	Berfin Şengül	Milli Piyango Curling Arena, Erzurum, Turkey	6th 5–4 (ECC); 5th 3–4 (OQE)		T5th 7–6	–	DNP	DNP	DNP	DNP	DNP	Prague Ladies International	32nd	112.663
Kim Eun-jung	Kim Kyeong-ae	Kim Cho-hi	Kim Seon-yeong	Gangneung City Hall, Gangneung, South Korea	–	4th 5–4 (KOR)	–	–	QF	Q	DNP	Q	DNP	St. Paul Cash Spiel	33rd	111.200
Hailey Armstrong	Grace Lloyd	Michaela Robert	Rachel Steele	Whitby CC, Whitby, Ontario	(gold) 7–2 (ON)	8th 5–3 (STOH)	–	–	DNP	DNP	DNP	DNP	DNP	–	34th	102.813
Hollie Duncan	Megan Balsdon	Rachelle Strybosch	Tess Guyatt	Woodstock CC, Woodstock, Ontario	T9th 0–3 (ON)	–	–	–	DNP	DNP	DNP	T2	DNP	KW Fall Classic	35th	96.864
Kate Cameron	Briane Harris	Taylor McDonald	Mackenzie Elias	St. Adolphe CC, St. Adolphe, Manitoba	7th 1–6 (COCT); (bronze) 6–2 (MB)	–	–	–	T2	DNP	DNP	T2	DNP	–	36th	96.563
Fay Henderson	Lisa Davie	Hailey Duff	Katie McMillan	Dumfries Ice Bowl, Dumfries, Scotland	–	(gold) 5–0 (SCO)	10th 4–8	–	T2	DNP	DNP	DNP	DNP	–	37th	90.750
Gracelyn Richards	Emma Yarmuch	Rachel Jacques (Note: Jacques threw lead rocks, and Ryhorchuk threw second stones at the Alberta championship)	Sophia Ryhorchuk	Saville Community SC, Edmonton, Alberta	T7th 2–3 (AB)	–	–	–	DNP	DNP	DNP	DNP	DNP	U25 NextGen Classic (2026), Canada West Championships	38th	90.313
Chelsea Principi	Lauren Peskett	Brenda Champman	Keira McLaughlin	Niagara Falls CC, Niagara Falls, Ontario	(bronze) 3–2 (ON)	–	–	–	DNP	DNP	DNP	DNP	DNP	Swiss Chalet Women's Curling Stadium Spiel, Stroud Sleeman Cash Spiel	39th	85.688
Jolene Campbell	Robyn Silvernagle	Rachel Big Eagle	Dayna Demmans	Highland CC, Regina, Saskatchewan	(gold) 8–2 (SK)	10th 3–5 (STOH)	–	–	DNP	DNP	DNP	DNP	DNP	–	40th	78.450
Emma Artichuk	Jamie Smith	Evelyn Robert	Lauren Rajala	KW Granite Club, Waterloo, Ontario	T9th 1–3 (ON)	–	–	–	DNP	DNP	DNP	DNP	DNP	–	41st	74.851
Delaney Strouse	Anne O'Hara (Note: O'Hara played lead and Bear third at the Pan Continental Qualifier)	Sydney Mullaney	Madison Bear (Note: Bear skipped the team, while throwing lead stones at the US Olympic Trials and at the Masters Tier 2. She played third at the Pan Continental Qualifier while O'Hara threw lead stones.)	(United States) Traverse City CC, Traverse City, Michigan	(bronze) 3–4 (USOCT); (silver) 3–3 (PCQ)	(gold) 6–4 (USA)	12th 2–10	–	T2	DNP	DNP	DNP	DNP	–	42nd	74.513
Danielle Inglis	Kira Brunton	Calissa Daly	Cassandra de Groot	Ottawa Hunt & GC, Ottawa, Ontario	4th 4–3 (COCPT); (silver) 6–2 (ON)	–	–	–	T2	DNP	DNP	DNP	DNP	–	43rd	74.038
Elizabeth Cousins	Annmarie Dubberstein	Allison Howell	Elizabeth Janiak	Nashua, New Hampshire, United States	(bronze) 2–3 (PCQ); (silver) 4–5 (USOCT)	(silver) 7–2 (USA)	–	–	DNP	DNP	DNP	DNP	DNP	–	44th	73.338
Laurie St-Georges	Sarah Daniels (Note: Daniels skipped and threw third stones at the Quebec Women's Championship)	Emily Riley (Note: Riley and Gagné switched positions at the Quebec Women's Championship)	Émilia Gagné	Glenmore CC, Dollard-des-Ormeaux & CC Laval-sur-le-Lac, Laval, Quebec	(silver) 4–2 (QC)	–	–	–	DNP	DNP	DNP	DNP	DNP	Stu Sells Brantford Nissan Classic	45th	73.138
Krista Scharf	Kendra Lilly	Ashley Sippala	Sarah Potts	Fort William CC, Thunder Bay, Ontario	6th 3–4 (COCPT); (gold) 7–0 (NO)	7th 5–3 (STOH)	–	–	DNP	DNP	DNP	DNP	DNP	Stu Sells Living Waters Collingwood Classic	46th	71.775
Kim Sutor	Emira Abbes	Zoé Antes	Sara Messenzehl (skip)	CC Füssen, Füssen, Germany	(silver) 5–1 (CPOQE); 9th 3–6 (ECC); 4th 4–3 (OQE)	–	–	–	DNP	DNP	DNP	DNP	DNP	–	47th	71.763
Ashley Thevenot	Stephanie Schmidt	Taylor Stremick	Kaylin Mattern	Martensville CC, Martensville, Saskatchewan	(bronze) 4–4 (COCPT); (bronze) 8–2 (SK)	–	–	–	DNP	DNP	DNP	T2	DNP	Regina Highland Rocksgiving	48th	71.275
Sara Miller	Ashley Williamson	Callan Hamon	Hannah Rugg	Highland CC, Regina, Saskatchewan	5th 3–5 (SK)	–	–	–	DNP	DNP	DNP	DNP	DNP	Nutana SaskTour Women's Spiel	49th	67.350
Nancy Martin	Chaelynn Stewart (Note: Stewart did not play in the Saskatchewan championship due to maternity leave. There, Lott played third, Gamble second and Colleen Ackerman lead)	Kadriana Lott	Christie Gamble	Martensville CC, Martensville, Saskatchewan	7th 2–5 (COCPT); 8th 2–6 (SK)	–	–	–	DNP	DNP	DNP	T2	DNP	Mother Club Fall Classic	50th	66.688

== Mixed doubles ==
Team			Playdown record	National championship record	World championship record	Olympics record	Event wins	World Curling team ranking	Points
Female	Male	Club/locale	Playdown record	National championship record	World championship record	Olympics record	Event wins	World Curling team ranking	Points
Tahli Gill	Dean Hewitt	Brisbane, Australia	(bronze) 6–3 (OQE)	(gold) 7–0 (AUS)	(gold) 10–1	–	Mixed Doubles Bern, Mixed Doubles Gstaad	1st	257.450
Cory Thiesse (Note: Thiesse was replaced by Sara Olson at the Madtown Doubledown event)	Korey Dropkin	Duluth, Minnesota, United States	–	–	–	(silver) 7–4	Gothenburg Cup, Saville Classic, Victoria Cash Spiel	2nd	212.150
Kristin Skaslien	Magnus Nedregotten	Oslo, Norway	–	–	–	6th 4–5	Super Series - Lindsay, Tallinn Masters, Baden Open	3rd	186.700
Therese Westman	Robin Ahlberg	Sundbybergs CK, Sundbyberg, Sweden	–	(gold) 7–0 (SWE)	(silver) 9–3	–	Mixed Doubles Łódź	4th	179.576
Kim Seon-yeong	Jeong Yeong-seok	Gangwon Province, South Korea	(silver) 8–1 (OQE)	(gold) 9–1 (KOR)	10th 5–4	9th 3–6	Dixie Cup	5th	167.214
Tori Koana	Go Aoki	Yamanashi / Hokkaido, Japan	(gold) 7–1 (JOMDCT); 5th 5–2 (OQE)	(gold) 8–1 (JPN)	5th 7–3	–	Mixed Doubles Karlstad	6th	166.776
Katie Ford (Note: Ford was replaced by Terri Weeks at the Palmerston Mixed Doubles Spiel - Tier 2 event)	Oliver Campbell	KW Granite Club, Waterloo, Ontario	(bronze) 5–3 (ON)	(bronze) 7–1 (CAN)	–	–	Madtown Doubledown	7th	150.302
Ye Zixuan (Note: Ye was replaced by Han Yu at the 2026 World Mixed Doubles Curling Championship)	Yu Sen	Beijing, China	4th 6–2 (OQE); 4th 7–0 (WMDQE)		12th 4–5	–	Tallinn International	8th	150.052
Isabella Wranå	Rasmus Wranå	Sundbybergs CK, Sundbyberg & Karlstads CK Karlstad, Sweden	–	–	–	(gold) 7–4	–	9th	142.650
Serena Gray-Withers (Note: Gray-Withers was replaced by Kira Brunton at the Mixed Doubles Super Series - Kitchener-Waterloo)	Victor Pietrangelo	(Alberta) Saville Community SC, Edmonton & Niagara Falls CC, Niagara Falls, Ontario	–	(gold) 8–1 (CAN)	–	–	U25 NextGen Classic	10th	139.438
Julie Zelingrová	Vít Chabičovský	Dion WC, Prague, Czech Republic	(gold) 3–1 (COMDCT); (gold) 7–1 (OQE)	(silver) 7–5 (CZE)	–	8th 3–6	Prague Open, Prague Trophy	11th	136.5
Jennifer Dodds	Bruce Mouat	Stirling, Scotland	–	–	–	4th 8–3	Stirling Invitational	12th	131.800
Jenny Perret	Martin Rios	CC Glarus, Glarus, Switzerland	–	(bronze) 3–3 (SUI)	–	–	Aly Jenkins Memorial	13th	118.352
Stefania Constantini	Amos Mosaner	Cortina d'Ampezzo, Italy	–	–	–	(bronze) 7–4	–	14th	115.550
Marie Kaldvee	Harri Lill	Tallinn, Estonia	–	(gold) 8–0 (EST)	7th 6–3	10th 2–7	–	15th	114.776
Laura Neil (Note: Neil was replaced by Megan Smith at the Keith Martin Memorial Mixed Doubles and the Ontario Mixed Doubles Tour Championship)	Scott McDonald	St. Thomas CC, St. Thomas, Ontario	–	8th 5–3 (CAN)	–	–	Palmerston Spiel, St. Thomas Classic, Cincinnati Cup, Ontario Tour Championship, Keith Martin Memorial	16th	112.900
Kadriana Lott	Colton Lott	Gimli CC, Gimli, Manitoba	–	–	(bronze) 9–2	–	Mixed Doubles Players' Championship	17th	105.876
Sophie Sanscartier	Maxandre Caron	CC Boucherville, Boucherville, Quebec	(gold) 7–0 (QC)	6th 5–2 (CAN)	–	–	Goldline Mixed Doubles Mont-Bruno, Challenge Boucherville	18th	102.476
Chiaki Matsumura	Yasumasa Tanida	Nagano / Hokkaido, Japan	(silver) 3–5 (JOMDCT)	(silver) 9–1 (JPN)	–	–	Sherwood Park Tier 1	19th	99.764
Katie McMillan	Angus Bryce	Stirling, Scotland	–	(gold) 6–0 (SCO)	5th 6–4	–	Uppsala Mixed Doubles	20th	92.250
Eilin Kjærland	Mathias Brænden	Haugesund CK, Haugesund, Norway	–	(bronze) 5–1 (NOR)	9th 4–5	–	–	21st	90.800
Melissa Adams	Alex Robichaud	Capital WC, Fredericton, New Brunswick	–	7th 6–2 (CAN)	–	–	Goldline Jacques Cartier, John Ross & Sons Spiel, Fredericton Cashspiel	22nd	90.7
Terri Weeks	Sam Steep (Note: Steep was replaced by Oliver Campbell at the Palmerston Spiel - Tier 2)	KW Granite Club, Waterloo, Ontario	T12th 3–2 (ON)	10th 4–3 (CAN)	–	–	St. Marys Mixed Doubles, Kemptville Fall Classic	23rd	88.582
Riley Craig	Brendan Craig	St. Catharines G&CC, St. Catharines, Ontario	T5th 4–2 (ON)	12th 3–4 (CAN)	–	–	Northern Credit Union Open	24th	83.850
Han Yu (Note: Han only played in the 2026 World Mixed Doubles Curling Championship with Yu. Ye Zixuan played in all other events with him, whose partnership is ranked separately here.)	Yu Sen	Beijing, China	4th 6–2 (OQE); 4th 7–0 (WMDQE)		12th 4–5	–	Tallinn International	25th	83.276
Zoe Cinnamon	Johnson Tao	Saville Community SC, Edmonton, Alberta	(gold) 4–0 (AB)	(silver) 7–2 (CAN)	–	–	–	26th	82.476
Kira Brunton	Jacob Horgan (Note: Horgan was replaced by Wesley Forget at the Montana's North Bay event)	Ottawa Hunt&GC, Ottawa, Ontario	(gold) 7–1 (ON)	5th 6–1 (CAN)	–	–	Jamaica Cup Cashspiel, Montana's North Bay	27th	78.563
Jocelyn Peterman	Brett Gallant	The Glencoe Club, Calgary, Alberta	–	16th 3–3 (CAN)	–	5th 4–5	Super Series - Moose Jaw	28th	78.226
Adela Walczak	Andrzej Augustyniak	Łódź, Poland	8th 6–2 (WMDQE)	–	–	–	–	29th	76.876
Anne-Sophie Gionest	Robert Desjardins	CC Chicoutimi, Chicoutimi & CC Riverbend, Alma, Quebec	(silver) 6–1 (QC)	14th 3–3 (CAN)	–	–	Goldline Grand-Mère	30th	75.526
Briar Schwaller-Hürlimann	Yannick Schwaller	Bern, Switzerland	–	–	–	7th 4–5	–	31st	75.276
Sarah Fenson (Anderson)	Andrew Stopera	Minneapolis, Minnesota, United States	–	(bronze) 7–1 (USA)	–	–	Super Series - Kitchener-Waterloo	32nd	71.800
Megan Smith	Dylan Niepage (Note: Niepage was replaced by Scott McDonald at the Keith Martin Memorial Mixed Doubles and the Ontario Mixed Doubles Tour Championship)	KW Granite Club, Waterloo, Ontario	T9th 3–3 (ON)	–	–	–	Keith Martin Memorial, Ontario Tour Championship	33rd	68.695
Zhang Lijun	Wang Zhiyu	Beijing, China	–		–	–	–	34th	64.5
Jennifer Jones	Brent Laing	Barrie CC, Barrie, Ontario	–	11th 3–4 (CAN)	–	–	Ilderton Spiel	35th	62.902
Meaghan Mallett	Brendan Jackson	City View CC, Nepean, Ontario	(silver) 6–2 (ON)	–	–	–	–	36th	58.700
Jessica Smith	Ben Smith	Naseby, New Zealand	(gold) 4–0 (NZMDQ)	(silver) 5–2 (NZL)	T15th 3–6	–	–	37th	58.2
Pia-Lisa Schöll	Joshua Sutor	Füssen, Germany	9th 3–4 (OQE)		–	–	–	38th	57.764
Kelly Tremblay (Note: Tremblay was replaced by Aline Fellmann at the Challenge Boucherville and by Véronique Bouchard at the Goldline Rivière-du-Loup event)	Pierre Lanoue (Note: Lanoue was replaced by Denis Robichaud at the Goldline Jacques Cartier event)	CC Nairn, Clermont & CC Boucherville, Boucherville, Quebec	(bronze) 5–1 (QC)	20th 2–4 (CAN)	–	–	–	39th	56.727
Courtney Woo	Daniel Wenzek	Langley CC, Langley, British Columbia & Cloverdale CC, Surrey, British Columbia	T5th 2–3 (BC)	24th 1–5 (CAN)	–	–	Cloverdale Thanksgiving Classic	40th	55.826
Grace Cave	Jayden King	Tillsonburg CC, Tillsonburg, Ontario	T9th 3–2 (ON)	–	–	–	–	41st	55.264
Nancy Martin	Steve Laycock (Note: Laycock was replaced by Rylan Kleiter at the Canadian Championship and by Jeremy Hozjan at the Southern States Mixed Doubles)	Martensville CC, Martensville, Saskatchewan & Nutana CC, Saskatoon, Saskatchewan	(gold) 8–1 (SK)	9th 4–3 (CAN)	–	–	Colorado Curling Cup, Southern States Mixed Doubles	42nd	54.938
Cassandra Spruit	Geoff Spruit	Winchester CC, Winchester, Ontario	T17th 2–3 (ON)	–	–	–	–	43rd	52.926
Rebecca Watson	Sean Beland	Capital WC, Fredericton, New Brunswick	(gold) 6–1 (NB)	15th 3–3 (CAN)	–	–	Overwatch Specialty Service Open	44th	52.576
Amélie Maheux	David Maheux	Mt. Bruno CC, Saint-Bruno, Quebec	T5th 4–2 (QC)	–	–	–	–	45th	52.4
Laura Engler	Kevin Wunderlin	CC Zug, Zug, Switzerland	–	4th 3–2 (SUI)	–	–	–	46th	51.7
McKenna Nathan	Tanner Nathan	Sarnia G&CC, Point Edward, Ontario	T5th 4–3 (ON)	23rd 2–4 (CAN)	–	–	–	47th	50.276
Dorottya Udvardi-Palancsa	Lőrinc Tatár	Újpesti TE, Budapest, Hungary	(silver) 5–1 (WMDQE)	(gold) 8–2 (HUN)	T15th 3–6	–	–	48th	49.664
Petra Klímová	Lukáš Klíma	Prague, Czech Republic	–	(gold) 10–1 (CZE)	11th 4–5	–	–	49th	49.2
Stéphanie Barbarin	Wilfrid Coulot	Besançon CC, Besançon, France	15th 2–5 (OQE); (bronze) 6–0 (WMDQE)	(gold) 7–1 (FRA)	T17th 1–8	–	–	50th	48.954
