= 2026 BC Men's Curling Championship =

2025 BC Men's Curling Championship
- Host city: Esquimalt, British Columbia
- Arena: Archie Browning Sports Centre
- Dates: December 30, 2025 – January 4, 2026
- Winner: Team Tanaka
- Curling club: Kamloops CC, Kamloops & Richmond CC, Richmond
- Skip: Cody Tanaka
- Third: Jared Kolomaya
- Second: Mitchell Kopytko
- Lead: Coburn Fadden
- Finalist: Jason Montgomery

The 2026 BC Men's Curling Championship, the provincial men's curling championship for British Columbia, was held from December 30, 2025, to January 4, 2026, at the Archie Browning Sports Centre in Esquimalt, British Columbia. The winning Cody Tanaka rink represented British Columbia at the 2026 Montana's Brier in St. John's, Newfoundland and Labrador. The event was held in conjunction with the 2026 BC Women's Curling Championship, the women's provincial curling championship.

== Qualification process ==
The qualification process is as follows:

Qualification method	Berths	Qualifying team(s)
2025 Provincial Champion	1	Cameron de Jong
CTRS Leaders	8	Matthew Blandford; Jason Montgomery; Richard Krell; Jay Wakefield; Matt Tolley; Cody Tanaka; Brad Wood; Rob Nobert
Open Qualifier	3	Wes Craig; Andrew Komlodi; Brad Thompson

== Teams ==
The teams are listed as follows:

Skip	Third	Second	Lead	Alternate	Coach	Club(s)
Matthew Blandford	Sébastien Robillard	Cody Johnston	Matthew Fenton			Royal City CC, New Westminster
Wes Craig	Normand Cote	Keith Clarke	Chris Atchison			Duncan CC, Duncan
Cameron de Jong	Sterling Middleton	Alex Horvath	Corey Chester			Victoria CC, Victoria
Richard Krell	Daniel Wenzek	Jordan Tardi	Nicholas Meister		Paul Tardi	Langley CC, Langley
Andrew Komlodi	Joel Cave	Josh Hozack	Thomas Thierbach			Victoria CC, Victoria
Jason Montgomery	Chris Baier	Miles Craig	Troy Cowan			Victoria CC, Victoria
Rob Nobert	Kelly McQuiggan	Nolan Blaeser	Greg Poggemoeller			Vernon CC, Vernon
Cody Tanaka	Jared Kolomaya	Mitchell Kopytko	Coburn Fadden			Kamloops CC, Kamloops; Richmond CC, Richmond
Matt Tolley	Darin Gerow	Jesse Monette	Cam Weir			Penticton CC, Penticton; Salmon Arm CC, Salmon Arm
Jay Wakefield	Matthew McCrady	Chris Parkinson	Daniel Deng		Brad Fenton	Royal City CC, New Westminster
Adam Windsor (Fourth)	Brad Thompson (Skip)	Matt Whiteford	Bryce Laufer	Calder Fadden		Kamloops CC, Kamloops
Jim Cotter (Fourth)	Connor Deane	Tim March	Brad Wood (Skip)			Penticton CC, Penticton; Vernon CC, Vernon

== Knockout Brackets ==
=== A Event ===
First Knockout	Qualifier 1
Cameron de Jong	8
Brad Wood	8	Brad Wood	3
Rob Nobert	3	Cameron de Jong	10
Jay Wakefield	4
Richard Krell	5
Jay Wakefield	11	Jay Wakefield	8
Andrew Komlodi	4	Cameron de Jong	8
Jason Montgomery	10
Matthew Blandford	8
Cody Tanaka	8	Cody Tanaka	6
Brad Thompson	2	Matthew Blandford	3
Jason Montgomery	8
Jason Montgomery	9
Matt Tolley	6	Wes Craig	6
Wes Craig	8

=== B Event ===
Second Knockout	Qualifier 2
Matthew Blandford	5
Rob Nobert	4	Richard Krell	7
Richard Krell	7	Richard Krell	4
Jay Wakefield	7
Jay Wakefield	8
Brad Thompson	7	Brad Thompson	4
Wes Craig	5	Jay Wakefield	3
Cody Tanaka	9
Cameron de Jong	5
Andrew Komlodi	1	Cody Tanaka	9
Brad Wood	9	Brad Wood	7
Matt Tolley	1	Cody Tanaka	10
Cody Tanaka	7

=== C Event ===
Third Knockout	Qualifier 3
Andrew Komlodi	5
Jay Wakefield	10
Matthew Blandford	6
Matthew Blandford	10	Matthew Blandford	3
Brad Thompson	4
Matt Tolley	5
Brad Thompson	6

Third Knockout	Qualifier 4
Cameron de Jong	9
Rob Nobert	8	Rob Nobert	3
Wes Craig	6	Cameron de Jong	2
Richard Krell	10
Brad Wood	4
Richard Krell	5

== Knockout Results ==
All draw times listed in Pacific Time (UTC−08:00).

=== Draw 1 ===
Tuesday, December 30, 9:00 am

Sheet B	1	2	3	4	5	6	7	8	9	10	Final
Brad Wood	0	0	2	2	0	1	1	0	2	X	8
Rob Nobert 🔨	0	1	0	0	1	0	0	1	0	X	3

Sheet D	1	2	3	4	5	6	7	8	9	10	Final
Jay Wakefield 🔨	0	2	2	0	3	0	2	2	X	X	11
Andrew Komlodi	0	0	0	3	0	1	0	0	X	X	4

Sheet E	1	2	3	4	5	6	7	8	9	10	Final
Cody Tanaka	0	0	3	1	2	0	2	X	X	X	8
Brad Thompson 🔨	1	0	0	0	0	1	0	X	X	X	2

=== Draw 2 ===
Tuesday, December 30, 2:00 pm

Sheet A	1	2	3	4	5	6	7	8	9	10	Final
Cameron de Jong 🔨	4	0	0	1	1	0	1	1	X	X	8
Brad Wood	0	1	1	0	0	1	0	0	X	X	3

Sheet B	1	2	3	4	5	6	7	8	9	10	11	Final
Matt Tolley 🔨	0	1	1	0	0	0	1	0	0	3	0	6
Wes Craig	1	0	0	1	0	1	0	2	1	0	2	8

Sheet C	1	2	3	4	5	6	7	8	9	10	Final
Richard Krell 🔨	2	0	1	1	0	0	1	0	0	0	5
Jay Wakefield	0	2	0	0	1	1	0	2	1	1	8

=== Draw 3 ===
Tuesday, December 30, 7:00 pm

Sheet A	1	2	3	4	5	6	7	8	9	10	11	Final
Matthew Blandford	0	1	0	0	2	0	1	0	2	0	2	8
Cody Tanaka 🔨	1	0	1	0	0	2	0	1	0	1	0	6

Sheet E	1	2	3	4	5	6	7	8	9	10	Final
Jason Montgomery	1	0	2	1	0	3	0	2	0	X	9
Wes Craig 🔨	0	3	0	0	1	0	1	0	1	X	6

=== Draw 4 ===
Wednesday, December 31, 9:00 am

Sheet A	1	2	3	4	5	6	7	8	9	10	Final
Rob Nobert	0	0	0	1	0	0	1	0	2	X	4
Richard Krell 🔨	0	1	1	0	2	1	0	2	0	X	7

Sheet B	1	2	3	4	5	6	7	8	9	10	Final
Brad Thompson 🔨	1	2	0	0	1	0	0	1	0	2	7
Wes Craig	0	0	1	1	0	1	0	0	2	0	5

Sheet D	1	2	3	4	5	6	7	8	9	10	Final
Matt Tolley	0	0	0	1	0	0	0	X	X	X	1
Cody Tanaka 🔨	0	1	1	0	2	1	2	X	X	X	7

Sheet E	1	2	3	4	5	6	7	8	9	10	Final
Andrew Komlodi	0	0	1	0	0	0	0	X	X	X	1
Brad Wood 🔨	0	2	0	2	1	2	2	X	X	X	9

=== Draw 5 ===
Wednesday, December 31, 2:00 pm

Sheet C	1	2	3	4	5	6	7	8	9	10	Final
Matthew Blandford 🔨	0	1	0	1	0	1	0	0	X	X	3
Jason Montgomery	1	0	1	0	2	0	2	2	X	X	8

Sheet E	1	2	3	4	5	6	7	8	9	10	Final
Cameron de Jong	0	0	1	1	0	6	0	2	X	X	10
Jay Wakefield 🔨	0	1	0	0	2	0	1	0	X	X	4

=== Draw 6 ===
Wednesday, December 31, 7:00 pm

Sheet C	1	2	3	4	5	6	7	8	9	10	Final
Brad Wood 🔨	2	0	0	1	0	2	0	0	2	0	7
Cody Tanaka	0	3	0	0	2	0	3	1	0	1	10

Sheet D	1	2	3	4	5	6	7	8	9	10	Final
Jay Wakefield	1	1	0	2	0	3	0	1	X	X	8
Brad Thompson 🔨	0	0	2	0	1	0	1	0	X	X	4

Sheet E	1	2	3	4	5	6	7	8	9	10	Final
Matthew Blandford 🔨	0	0	3	0	0	2	0	0	0	X	5
Richard Krell	2	2	0	0	1	0	0	0	2	X	7

=== Draw 7 ===
Thursday, January 1, 9:00 am

Sheet D	1	2	3	4	5	6	7	8	9	10	11	Final
Cameron de Jong 🔨	1	0	2	0	0	2	0	0	3	0	0	8
Jason Montgomery	0	2	0	2	0	0	0	3	0	1	2	10

=== Draw 8 ===
Thursday, January 1, 2:00 pm

Sheet A	1	2	3	4	5	6	7	8	9	10	Final
Andrew Komlodi	0	0	0	2	1	0	1	0	1	0	5
Matthew Blandford 🔨	1	2	0	0	0	1	0	1	0	1	6

Sheet B	1	2	3	4	5	6	7	8	9	10	Final
Cameron de Jong	0	0	0	2	0	1	0	2	0	X	5
Cody Tanaka 🔨	4	1	1	0	1	0	1	0	1	X	9

Sheet C	1	2	3	4	5	6	7	8	9	10	Final
Matt Tolley	0	2	0	0	0	0	1	0	1	1	5
Brad Thompson 🔨	1	0	2	0	0	2	0	1	0	0	6

Sheet D	1	2	3	4	5	6	7	8	9	10	Final
Richard Krell	0	1	0	0	1	0	0	2	0	X	4
Jay Wakefield 🔨	2	0	0	1	0	2	1	0	1	X	7

Sheet E	1	2	3	4	5	6	7	8	9	10	Final
Rob Nobert	3	0	1	0	1	0	1	0	2	X	8
Wes Craig 🔨	0	2	0	2	0	1	0	1	0	X	6

=== Draw 9 ===
Thursday, January 1, 7:00 pm

Sheet A	1	2	3	4	5	6	7	8	9	10	11	Final
Brad Wood	0	0	1	0	1	0	1	0	1	0	0	4
Richard Krell 🔨	1	1	0	0	0	1	0	0	0	1	1	5

=== Draw 10 ===
Friday, January 2, 9:00 am

Sheet C	1	2	3	4	5	6	7	8	9	10	Final
Cameron de Jong 🔨	1	2	0	2	0	2	0	2	X	X	9
Rob Nobert	0	0	1	0	1	0	1	0	X	X	3

Sheet D	1	2	3	4	5	6	7	8	9	10	Final
Jay Wakefield	0	0	1	0	2	0	X	X	X	X	3
Cody Tanaka 🔨	0	4	0	3	0	2	X	X	X	X	9

=== Draw 11 ===
Friday, January 2, 2:00 pm

Sheet B	1	2	3	4	5	6	7	8	9	10	Final
Matthew Blandford 🔨	1	0	3	1	1	0	0	2	2	X	10
Brad Thompson	0	2	0	0	0	1	1	0	0	X	4

=== Draw 12 ===
Friday, January 2, 7:00 pm

Sheet A	1	2	3	4	5	6	7	8	9	10	Final
Jay Wakefield 🔨	1	0	2	0	2	4	1	X	X	X	10
Matthew Blandford	0	1	0	2	0	0	0	X	X	X	3

Sheet E	1	2	3	4	5	6	7	8	9	10	Final
Cameron de Jong	0	0	1	1	0	X	X	X	X	X	2
Richard Krell 🔨	2	3	0	0	5	X	X	X	X	X	10

== Playoffs ==
Page playoff system
A	Jason Montgomery	8
B	Cody Tanaka	4
C1	Jay Wakefield	7
C2	Richard Krell	8

Semifinal
B	Cody Tanaka	5
C2	Richard Krell	4

Final
A	Jason Montgomery	5
B	Cody Tanaka	6

=== A vs. B ===
Friday, January 2, 7:00 pm

Sheet B	1	2	3	4	5	6	7	8	9	10	Final
Jason Montgomery 🔨	0	1	0	0	3	0	3	0	1	X	8
Cody Tanaka	1	0	0	1	0	1	0	1	0	X	4

=== C1 vs. C2 ===
Saturday, January 3, 9:00 am

Sheet B	1	2	3	4	5	6	7	8	9	10	Final
Jay Wakefield	0	0	3	0	0	2	0	0	2	0	7
Richard Krell 🔨	0	1	0	3	1	0	0	1	0	2	8

=== Semifinal ===
Saturday, January 3, 7:00 pm

Sheet B	1	2	3	4	5	6	7	8	9	10	Final
Cody Tanaka 🔨	0	1	0	0	0	3	0	0	1	0	5
Richard Krell	0	0	0	1	0	0	2	0	0	1	4

=== Final ===
Sunday, January 4, 2:00 pm

Sheet D	1	2	3	4	5	6	7	8	9	10	Final
Jason Montgomery 🔨	0	0	2	0	0	1	0	0	2	0	5
Cody Tanaka	0	0	0	0	2	0	0	2	0	2	6

2026 BC Men's Curling Championship

Cody Tanaka
1st British Columbia Provincial Championship title
