= 2025 BC Men's Curling Championship =

- Host city: Langley, British Columbia
- Arena: George Preston Arena
- Dates: January 21–26
- Winner: Team de Jong
- Curling club: Victoria CC, Victoria
- Skip: Cameron de Jong
- Third: Alex Horvath
- Second: Corey Chester
- Lead: Brayden Carpenter
- Alternate: Paul Cseke
- Finalist: Glenn Venance

The 2025 BC Men's Curling Championship, the provincial men's curling championship for British Columbia, was held from January 21 to 26 at the George Preston Arena in Langley, British Columbia. The winning Cameron de Jong rink will represent British Columbia as the host team at the 2025 Montana's Brier in Kelowna, British Columbia. The event was held in conjunction with the 2025 BC Women's Curling Championship.

== Qualification process ==
The qualification process is as follows:

Qualification method	Berths	Qualifying team(s)
Defending Champion	~~1~~ 0	~~Catlin Schneider~~ (Note: The defending team, skipped by Catlin Schneider, disbanded at the end of last year. The last spot was added as an Open Qualifier berth.)
BC Curling Tour (Note: If the event champion already has a berth or is ineligible, the berth will go to the second-place team. If neither of the top 2 teams are eligible, it will alternate between being allocated to a CTRS berth and an Open berth.)	~~7~~ 4	Brent Pierce; Jason Montgomery; Cameron de Jong; Jeff Richard
CTRS Leaders	~~2~~ 4	Glen Venance; Connor Deanne; Jared Kolomaya; Rob Nobert
Open Qualifier	~~2~~ 4	Jay Wakefield; Frank O'Driscoll; Brad Thompson; Jeff Guignard

== Teams ==
The teams are listed as follows:

Skip	Third	Second	Lead	Alternate	Coach	Club(s)
Connor Deane	Matthew McCrady	Joshua Miki	Connor Kent		Greg Deane	Royal City CC, New Westminster; Kelowna CC, Kelowna
Cameron de Jong	Alex Horvath	Corey Chester	Brayden Carpenter	Paul Cseke		Victoria CC, Victoria
Jeff Guignard	Chris Faa	Patrick Prade	Chris Gomes		Al Moore	Vancouver CC, Vancouver
Jared Kolomaya	Cody Tanaka	Andrew Nerpin	Nicholas Meister	Nathan Small		Tunnel Town CC, Delta; Langley CC, Langley; Kamloops CC, Kamloops
Jason Montgomery	Chris Baier	Miles Craig	Troy Cowan			Victoria CC, Victoria
Rob Nobert	Mitchell Kopytko	Coburn Fadden	Cam Weir			Vernon CC, Vernon; Kamloops CC, Kamloops
Frank O'Driscoll	Lyle Sieg	Blake Fizzard	Rhett Hildenbrandt	Alex Duncan-Wu		Royal City CC, New Westminster
Brent Pierce	Matthew Blandford	Cody Johnston	Nicholas Umbach		Darah Blandford	Royal City CC, New Westminster
Jeff Richard	Richard Krell	Daniel Wenzek	Brendan Acorn			Vancouver CC, Vancouver; Vernon CC, Vernon; Langley CC, Langley
Brook Calibaba (Fourth)	Brad Thompson (Skip)	Matt Whiteford	Bryce Laufer			Kamloops CC, Kamloops
Glenn Venance	Sébastien Robillard	Erik Colwell	Matthew Tolley			Penticton CC, Penticton
Jay Wakefield	Daniel Deng	Chris Parkinson	Matthew Fenton		Brad Fenton	Royal City CC, New Westminster

== Knockout Brackets ==
=== A Event ===
First Knockout	Qualifier 1
Brent Pierce	14
Rob Nobert	8	Rob Nobert	11
Brad Thompson	5	Brent Pierce	3
Glenn Venance	6
Glenn Venance	6
Jason Montgomery	11	Jason Montgomery	1
Frank O'Driscoll	3	Glenn Venance	4
Jared Kolomaya	5
Cameron de Jong	6
Connor Deane	10	Connor Deane	1
Jeff Guignard	3	Cameron de Jong	5
Jared Kolomaya	8
Jeff Richard	6
Jared Kolomaya	10	Jared Kolomaya	9
Jay Wakefield	6

=== B Event ===
Second Knockout	Qualifier 2
Cameron de Jong	9
Brad Thompson	8	Brad Thompson	2
Jason Montgomery	6	Cameron de Jong	3
Connor Deane	7
Brent Pierce	7
Frank O'Driscoll	2	Connor Deane	8
Connor Deane	12	Connor Deane	3
Glenn Venance	7
Glenn Venance	6
Jeff Guignard	2	Jeff Richard	4
Jeff Richard	8	Jeff Richard	6
Jay Wakefield	6	Jay Wakefield	5
Rob Nobert	4

=== C Event ===
Third Knockout	Qualifier 3
Jeff Richard	3
Jason Montgomery	7	Jason Montgomery	8
Frank O'Driscoll	4	Jason Montgomery	5
Cameron de Jong	6
Jay Wakefield	7
Cameron de Jong	10

Third Knockout	Qualifier 4
Jeff Guignard	1
Connor Deane	7
Brad Thompson	8
Brad Thompson	6	Brad Thompson	5
Brent Pierce	5
Rob Nobert	5
Brent Pierce	7

== Knockout Results ==
All draw times listed in Pacific Time (UTC−08:00).

=== Draw 1 ===
Tuesday, January 21, 9:00 am

Sheet B	1	2	3	4	5	6	7	8	9	10	Final
Rob Nobert	1	1	1	1	0	2	0	1	1	X	8
Brad Thompson 🔨	0	0	0	0	2	0	3	0	0	X	5

Sheet D	1	2	3	4	5	6	7	8	9	10	Final
Jason Montgomery 🔨	0	2	0	3	0	3	3	X	X	X	11
Frank O'Driscoll	1	0	1	0	1	0	0	X	X	X	3

=== Draw 2 ===
Tuesday, January 21, 2:00 pm

Sheet A	1	2	3	4	5	6	7	8	9	10	Final
Connor Deane 🔨	0	3	1	0	1	0	1	4	X	X	10
Jeff Guignard	0	0	0	2	0	1	0	0	X	X	3

Sheet C	1	2	3	4	5	6	7	8	9	10	Final
Jared Kolomaya	0	0	3	0	0	1	2	1	0	3	10
Jay Wakefield 🔨	0	2	0	2	1	0	0	0	1	0	6

Sheet E	1	2	3	4	5	6	7	8	9	10	11	Final
Brent Pierce	0	2	0	1	0	1	0	4	3	0	3	14
Rob Nobert 🔨	1	0	3	0	5	0	1	0	0	1	0	11

=== Draw 3 ===
Tuesday, January 21, 7:00 pm

Sheet A	1	2	3	4	5	6	7	8	9	10	Final
Jeff Richard	0	0	1	0	1	3	0	0	1	0	6
Jared Kolomaya 🔨	0	2	0	2	0	0	0	3	0	2	9

Sheet B	1	2	3	4	5	6	7	8	9	10	Final
Glenn Venance 🔨	0	2	0	0	2	1	0	1	X	X	6
Jason Montgomery	0	0	0	0	0	0	1	0	X	X	1

Sheet D	1	2	3	4	5	6	7	8	9	10	Final
Cameron de Jong	0	0	0	1	0	0	0	4	1	X	6
Connor Deane 🔨	0	0	0	0	1	0	0	0	0	X	1

=== Draw 4 ===
Wednesday, January 22, 9:00 am

Sheet A	1	2	3	4	5	6	7	8	9	10	Final
Brent Pierce	0	0	0	0	2	0	0	1	0	X	3
Glenn Venance 🔨	0	2	0	0	0	0	1	0	3	X	6

Sheet C	1	2	3	4	5	6	7	8	9	10	Final
Brad Thompson 🔨	2	2	1	0	0	1	1	1	0	X	8
Jason Montgomery	0	0	0	5	0	0	0	0	1	X	6

=== Draw 5 ===
Wednesday, January 22, 2:00 pm

Sheet B	1	2	3	4	5	6	7	8	9	10	11	Final
Cameron de Jong	1	0	0	1	0	1	0	1	0	1	0	5
Jared Kolomaya 🔨	0	1	0	0	1	0	1	0	2	0	3	8

Sheet E	1	2	3	4	5	6	7	8	9	10	Final
Frank O'Driscoll 🔨	1	0	0	1	0	X	X	X	X	X	2
Connor Deane	0	3	3	0	6	X	X	X	X	X	12

=== Draw 6 ===
Wednesday, January 22, 7:00 pm

Sheet A	1	2	3	4	5	6	7	8	9	10	Final
Jay Wakefield 🔨	0	0	0	2	0	0	1	1	1	1	6
Rob Nobert	0	0	1	0	2	1	0	0	0	0	4

Sheet C	1	2	3	4	5	6	7	8	9	10	Final
Jeff Guignard	0	1	1	0	0	0	0	0	X	X	2
Jeff Richard 🔨	2	0	0	2	1	1	1	1	X	X	8

=== Draw 7 ===
Thursday, January 23, 9:00 am

Sheet A	1	2	3	4	5	6	7	8	9	10	Final
Cameron de Jong	0	1	3	2	0	1	2	X	X	X	9
Brad Thompson 🔨	1	0	0	0	1	0	0	X	X	X	2

Sheet C	1	2	3	4	5	6	7	8	9	10	Final
Brent Pierce	0	2	0	0	1	1	2	0	1	0	7
Connor Deane 🔨	2	0	1	2	0	0	0	2	0	1	8

Sheet D	1	2	3	4	5	6	7	8	9	10	Final
Jeff Richard 🔨	0	2	0	1	0	1	0	1	0	1	6
Jay Wakefield	0	0	2	0	1	0	2	0	0	0	5

=== Draw 8 ===
Thursday, January 23, 2:00 pm

Sheet A	1	2	3	4	5	6	7	8	9	10	Final
Jason Montgomery	1	0	2	0	0	0	2	0	2	X	7
Frank O'Driscoll 🔨	0	1	0	1	0	1	0	1	0	X	4

Sheet C	1	2	3	4	5	6	7	8	9	10	11	Final
Glenn Venance	0	1	0	0	1	0	0	1	0	1	0	4
Jared Kolomaya 🔨	0	0	1	0	0	1	0	0	2	0	1	5

Sheet E	1	2	3	4	5	6	7	8	9	10	Final
Cameron de Jong	0	0	1	0	1	1	0	0	0	X	3
Connor Deane 🔨	1	1	0	1	0	0	2	1	1	X	7

=== Draw 9 ===
Thursday, January 23, 7:00 pm

Sheet B	1	2	3	4	5	6	7	8	9	10	Final
Glenn Venance	0	0	1	0	2	1	0	0	1	1	6
Jeff Richard 🔨	0	1	0	1	0	0	1	1	0	0	4

=== Draw 10 ===
Friday, January 24, 9:00 am

Sheet B	1	2	3	4	5	6	7	8	9	10	Final
Rob Nobert 🔨	1	0	1	0	1	0	2	0	0	0	5
Brent Pierce	0	0	0	3	0	1	0	1	1	1	7

Sheet C	1	2	3	4	5	6	7	8	9	10	Final
Jeff Richard 🔨	0	2	0	1	0	0	0	X	X	X	3
Jason Montgomery	1	0	2	0	1	2	2	X	X	X	8

Sheet D	1	2	3	4	5	6	7	8	9	10	Final
Jeff Guignard	0	0	0	0	1	0	0	0	X	X	1
Brad Thompson 🔨	0	0	2	1	0	2	0	3	X	X	8

=== Draw 11 ===
Friday, January 24, 2:00 pm

Sheet A	1	2	3	4	5	6	7	8	9	10	Final
Brad Thompson	1	1	0	1	0	0	0	2	0	1	6
Brent Pierce 🔨	0	0	1	0	1	1	1	0	1	0	5

Sheet B	1	2	3	4	5	6	7	8	9	10	Final
Connor Deane	0	0	0	0	0	0	0	2	1	0	3
Glenn Venance 🔨	0	0	0	1	0	1	3	0	0	2	7

Sheet D	1	2	3	4	5	6	7	8	9	10	Final
Jay Wakefield 🔨	1	0	0	1	1	0	2	0	2	0	7
Cameron de Jong	0	2	1	0	0	2	0	2	0	3	10

=== Draw 12 ===
Friday, January 24, 7:00 pm

Sheet A	1	2	3	4	5	6	7	8	9	10	Final
Jason Montgomery	0	0	0	2	0	0	1	0	2	0	5
Cameron de Jong 🔨	0	1	1	0	1	1	0	1	0	1	6

Sheet E	1	2	3	4	5	6	7	8	9	10	Final
Connor Deane 🔨	2	0	0	2	1	1	0	0	0	1	7
Brad Thompson	0	2	1	0	0	0	1	0	1	0	5

== Playoffs ==
Page playoff system
A	Jared Kolomaya	5
B	Glenn Venance	6
C1	Cameron de Jong	6
C2	Connor Deane	4

Semifinal
A	Jared Kolomaya	5
C1	Cameron de Jong	8

Final
B	Glenn Venance	8
C1	Cameron de Jong	10

=== A vs. B ===
Friday, January 24, 7:00 pm

Sheet D	1	2	3	4	5	6	7	8	9	10	11	Final
Jared Kolomaya 🔨	0	1	0	0	0	1	0	2	0	1	0	5
Glenn Venance	0	0	0	2	0	0	2	0	1	0	1	6

=== C1 vs. C2 ===
Saturday, January 25, 9:00 am

Sheet B	1	2	3	4	5	6	7	8	9	10	Final
Cameron de Jong 🔨	0	0	2	0	2	0	1	0	0	1	6
Connor Deane	0	0	0	2	0	1	0	1	0	0	4

=== Semifinal ===
Saturday, January 25, 7:00 pm

Sheet C	1	2	3	4	5	6	7	8	9	10	Final
Jared Kolomaya 🔨	0	0	2	1	0	1	0	1	0	X	5
Cameron de Jong	0	0	0	0	3	0	2	0	3	X	8

=== Final ===
Sunday, January 26, 2:00 pm

Sheet C	1	2	3	4	5	6	7	8	9	10	Final
Glenn Venance 🔨	0	2	0	0	2	0	2	0	2	0	8
Cameron de Jong	0	0	1	1	0	4	0	3	0	1	10

2025 BC Men's Curling Championship

Cameron de Jong
1st British Columbia Provincial Championship title
