= 2024 BC Men's Curling Championship =

- Host city: Esquimalt, British Columbia
- Arena: Archie Browning Sports Centre
- Dates: January 23–28
- Winner: Team Schneider
- Curling club: Victoria CC, Victoria
- Skip: Catlin Schneider
- Third: Jason Ginter
- Second: Sterling Middleton
- Lead: Alex Horvath
- Coach: Bryan Miki
- Finalist: Jason Montgomery

The 2024 BC Men's Curling Championship, the provincial men's curling championship for British Columbia, was held from January 23 to 28 at the Archie Browning Sports Centre in Esquimalt, British Columbia. The winning Catlin Schneider rink represented British Columbia at the 2024 Montana's Brier in Regina, Saskatchewan. The event was held in conjunction with the 2024 British Columbia Scotties Tournament of Hearts, the provincial women's curling championship.

== Qualification process ==
Qualification method	Berths	Qualifying team(s)
Defending Champion	1	Catlin Schneider (Note: The defending champion skip, Jacques Gauthier left the team after the 2022–23 season and was replaced by Catlin Schneider as the skip. With the other three members returning, the team was able to carry over their defending champion berth.)
BC Curling Tour	4	Brent Pierce; Jason Montgomery; Sébastien Robillard; Brad Thompson
CTRS Leaders	4	Cameron de Jong; Jared Kolomaya; Rob Nobert; Jeff Richard
Open Qualifier	3	Corey Chester; Daniel Deng; Adam Fenton

== Teams ==
The teams are listed as follows:

Skip	Third	Second	Lead	Alternate	Coach	Club(s)
Corey Chester	Paul Cseke	Jay Wakefield	Ty Russell	Rhys Gamache		Victoria CC, Victoria
Cameron de Jong	Matt Tolley	Erik Colwell	Brayden Carpenter	John Slattery		Victoria CC, Victoria; Penticton CC, Penticton; Vernon CC, Vernon; Richmond CC, Richmond
Daniel Deng	Connor Kent	Logan Miron	Daniel Dabiri		Darren Kent	Victoria CC, Victoria; Royal City CC, New Westminster
Adam Fenton	Thomas Reed	Chris Parkinson	Miles Reed		Brad Fenton	Royal City CC, New Westminster
Jared Kolomaya	Cody Tanaka	Joshua Miki	Nicholas Meister	Matthew Fenton		Royal City CC, New Westminster; Langley CC, Langley; Richmond CC, Richmond
Jason Montgomery	Chris Baier	Miles Craig	Troy Cowan			Victoria CC, Victoria
Rob Nobert	Mitchell Kopytko	Coburn Fadden	Cam Weir			Vernon CC, Vernon; Kamloops CC, Kamloops
Brent Pierce	Cody Johnston	Kyler Kleibrink	Nicholas Umbach			Royal City CC, New Westminster
Jeff Richard	Richard Krell	Daniel Wenzek	Connor Deane			Vernon CC, Vernon; Royal City CC, New Westminster
Sébastien Robillard	Andrew Nerpin	Jordan Tardi	Nathan Small	Nathan Connolly	Paul Tardi	Victoria CC, Victoria
Catlin Schneider	Jason Ginter	Sterling Middleton	Alex Horvath		Bryan Miki	Victoria CC, Victoria
Brad Thompson	Adam Windsor	Matt Whiteford	Bryce Laufer		Brian Windsor	Kamloops CC, Kamloops

== Knockout brackets ==
=== A event ===
First Knockout	Qualifier 1
Catlin Schneider	7
Rob Nobert	9	Rob Nobert	5
Brad Thompson	2	Catlin Schneider	12
Sébastien Robillard	9
Cameron de Jong	5
Sébastien Robillard	10	Sébastien Robillard	7
Daniel Deng	3	Catlin Schneider	6
Jeff Richard	7
Jeff Richard	9
Jared Kolomaya	10	Jared Kolomaya	5
Adam Fenton	6	Jeff Richard	8
Brent Pierce	3
Brent Pierce	7
Jason Montgomery	5	Corey Chester	6
Corey Chester	7

=== B event ===
Second Knockout	Qualifier 2
Brent Pierce	5
Brad Thompson	7	Cameron de Jong	8
Cameron de Jong	8	Cameron de Jong	10
Jared Kolomaya	9
Sébastien Robillard	8
Daniel Deng	0	Jared Kolomaya	9
Jared Kolomaya	10	Cameron de Jong	9
Catlin Schneider	11
Catlin Schneider	8
Adam Fenton	5	Jason Montgomery	4
Corey Chester	6	Corey Chester	6
Jason Montgomery	8	Jason Montgomery	8
Rob Nobert	6

=== C event ===
Third Knockout	Qualifier 3
Jason Montgomery	8
Brad Thompson	5	Daniel Deng	6
Daniel Deng	11	Jason Montgomery	10
Jared Kolomaya	5
Jared Kolomaya	8
Corey Chester	5

Third Knockout				Qualifier 4
Adam Fenton	6
Brent Pierce	7	Brent Pierce	7
Rob Nobert	8	Rob Nobert	2
Sébastien Robillard	6			Brent Pierce	6
				Cameron de Jong	3

== Knockout results ==
All draw times listed in Pacific Time (UTC−08:00).

=== Draw 1 ===
Tuesday, January 23, 9:00 am

Sheet A	1	2	3	4	5	6	7	8	9	10	Final
Rob Nobert	2	0	3	1	1	2	X	X	X	X	9
Brad Thompson 🔨	0	2	0	0	0	0	X	X	X	X	2

Sheet D	1	2	3	4	5	6	7	8	9	10	Final
Sébastien Robillard	1	0	3	0	1	1	0	2	2	X	10
Daniel Deng 🔨	0	1	0	1	0	0	1	0	0	X	3

=== Draw 2 ===
Tuesday, January 23, 2:00 pm

Sheet D	1	2	3	4	5	6	7	8	9	10	Final
Jared Kolomaya 🔨	0	2	3	2	0	0	3	0	0	X	10
Adam Fenton	0	0	0	0	2	3	0	0	1	X	6

Sheet E	1	2	3	4	5	6	7	8	9	10	Final
Jason Montgomery 🔨	2	0	0	1	0	0	1	0	1	0	5
Corey Chester	0	0	1	0	1	1	0	2	0	2	7

=== Draw 3 ===
Tuesday, January 23, 7:00 pm

Sheet A	1	2	3	4	5	6	7	8	9	10	Final
Cameron de Jong 🔨	2	0	0	0	2	0	0	0	1	0	5
Sébastien Robillard	0	0	2	0	0	1	2	1	0	1	7

Sheet B	1	2	3	4	5	6	7	8	9	10	Final
Catlin Schneider 🔨	1	0	0	2	0	0	2	1	0	1	7
Rob Nobert	0	1	1	0	1	1	0	0	1	0	5

Sheet C	1	2	3	4	5	6	7	8	9	10	11	Final
Brent Pierce 🔨	0	1	0	1	0	2	1	0	1	0	1	7
Corey Chester	0	0	1	0	2	0	0	2	0	1	0	6

Sheet E	1	2	3	4	5	6	7	8	9	10	Final
Jeff Richard	1	0	3	0	2	0	1	2	0	X	9
Jared Kolomaya 🔨	0	1	0	2	0	2	0	0	0	X	5

=== Draw 4 ===
Wednesday, January 24, 9:00 am

Sheet A	1	2	3	4	5	6	7	8	9	10	Final
Adam Fenton 🔨	0	1	0	0	1	0	0	0	3	0	5
Corey Chester	0	0	2	0	0	2	0	1	0	1	6

Sheet B	1	2	3	4	5	6	7	8	9	10	Final
Daniel Deng	0	0	0	0	0	X	X	X	X	X	0
Jared Kolomaya 🔨	0	2	3	3	2	X	X	X	X	X	10

Sheet D	1	2	3	4	5	6	7	8	9	10	11	Final
Jason Montgomery 🔨	0	1	1	0	2	0	1	0	0	1	2	8
Rob Nobert	1	0	0	1	0	2	0	2	0	0	0	6

Sheet E	1	2	3	4	5	6	7	8	9	10	Final
Brad Thompson 🔨	1	0	1	0	2	0	2	0	1	0	7
Cameron de Jong	0	1	0	2	0	1	0	2	0	2	8

=== Draw 5 ===
Wednesday, January 24, 2:00 pm

Sheet A	1	2	3	4	5	6	7	8	9	10	Final
Jeff Richard 🔨	2	0	2	0	2	1	1	X	X	X	8
Brent Pierce	0	2	0	1	0	0	0	X	X	X	3

Sheet C	1	2	3	4	5	6	7	8	9	10	Final
Catlin Schneider 🔨	4	3	0	1	0	1	0	0	0	3	12
Sébastien Robillard	0	0	3	0	2	0	2	0	2	0	9

=== Draw 6 ===
Wednesday, January 24, 7:00 pm

Sheet A	1	2	3	4	5	6	7	8	9	10	Final
Sébastien Robillard	0	2	0	1	0	2	1	2	0	0	8
Jared Kolomaya 🔨	1	0	2	0	3	0	0	0	0	3	9

Sheet C	1	2	3	4	5	6	7	8	9	10	Final
Brent Pierce	1	0	1	0	1	1	0	1	0	X	5
Cameron de Jong 🔨	0	1	0	2	0	0	1	0	4	X	8

=== Draw 7 ===
Thursday, January 25, 9:00 am

Sheet A	1	2	3	4	5	6	7	8	9	10	Final
Brad Thompson	0	0	2	0	2	0	0	1	0	X	5
Daniel Deng 🔨	1	3	0	2	0	2	0	0	3	X	11

Sheet B	1	2	3	4	5	6	7	8	9	10	Final
Adam Fenton	0	1	1	1	0	0	1	0	2	0	6
Brent Pierce 🔨	1	0	0	0	0	3	0	2	0	1	7

Sheet C	1	2	3	4	5	6	7	8	9	10	Final
Corey Chester	0	1	0	1	0	2	0	1	0	1	6
Jason Montgomery 🔨	1	0	2	0	1	0	1	0	3	0	8

Sheet D	1	2	3	4	5	6	7	8	9	10	Final
Cameron de Jong	2	0	1	0	0	2	2	0	0	3	10
Jared Kolomaya 🔨	0	3	0	2	1	0	0	3	0	0	9

=== Draw 8 ===
Thursday, January 25, 2:00 pm

Sheet C	1	2	3	4	5	6	7	8	9	10	Final
Rob Nobert	4	1	0	1	0	1	0	1	0	X	8
Sébastien Robillard 🔨	0	0	1	0	2	0	1	0	2	X	6

Sheet D	1	2	3	4	5	6	7	8	9	10	Final
Catlin Schneider	0	0	1	0	2	0	2	0	1	0	6
Jeff Richard 🔨	0	3	0	2	0	2	0	0	0	0	7

=== Draw 9 ===
Thursday, January 25, 7:00 pm

Sheet E	1	2	3	4	5	6	7	8	9	10	Final
Catlin Schneider 🔨	0	2	2	0	1	0	3	0	X	X	8
Jason Montgomery	0	0	0	2	0	1	0	1	X	X	4

=== Draw 10 ===
Friday, January 26, 9:00 am

Sheet B	1	2	3	4	5	6	7	8	9	10	Final
Jared Kolomaya	1	0	4	1	0	0	1	0	0	1	8
Corey Chester 🔨	0	1	0	0	2	1	0	1	0	0	5

Sheet D	1	2	3	4	5	6	7	8	9	10	11	Final
Jason Montgomery 🔨	0	0	0	0	2	0	0	2	0	2	2	8
Daniel Deng	1	0	0	1	0	1	1	0	2	0	0	6

=== Draw 11 ===
Friday, January 26, 2:00 pm

Sheet B	1	2	3	4	5	6	7	8	9	10	11	Final
Cameron de Jong	0	4	2	0	0	1	0	0	2	0	0	9
Catlin Schneider 🔨	2	0	0	2	1	0	3	0	0	1	2	11

Sheet E	1	2	3	4	5	6	7	8	9	10	Final
Brent Pierce	0	2	1	2	1	1	0	X	X	X	7
Rob Nobert 🔨	1	0	0	0	0	0	1	X	X	X	2

=== Draw 12 ===
Friday, January 26, 7:00 pm

Sheet A	1	2	3	4	5	6	7	8	9	10	Final
Brent Pierce 🔨	0	1	0	1	0	1	0	0	3	X	6
Cameron de Jong	1	0	1	0	0	0	0	1	0	X	3

Sheet C	1	2	3	4	5	6	7	8	9	10	Final
Jason Montgomery 🔨	3	0	0	2	2	0	0	2	1	X	10
Jared Kolomaya	0	1	1	0	0	3	0	0	0	X	5

== Playoffs ==
Page playoff system
A	Jeff Richard	3
B	Catlin Schneider	6
C1	Jason Montgomery	7
C2	Brent Pierce	4

Semifinal
A	Jeff Richard	5
C1	Jason Montgomery	7

Final
B	Catlin Schneider	5
C1	Jason Montgomery	2

=== A vs. B ===
Saturday, January 27, 9:00 am

Sheet D	1	2	3	4	5	6	7	8	9	10	Final
Jeff Richard	0	0	1	1	0	0	1	0	0	X	3
Catlin Schneider 🔨	1	1	0	0	0	2	0	0	2	X	6

=== C1 vs. C2 ===
Saturday, January 27, 2:00 pm

Sheet D	1	2	3	4	5	6	7	8	9	10	Final
Jason Montgomery	1	0	0	1	1	1	0	0	2	1	7
Brent Pierce 🔨	0	1	1	0	0	0	2	0	0	0	4

=== Semifinal ===
Saturday, January 27, 7:00 pm

Sheet D	1	2	3	4	5	6	7	8	9	10	Final
Jeff Richard	0	1	0	0	2	0	1	0	1	X	5
Jason Montgomery 🔨	0	0	2	2	0	2	0	1	0	X	7

=== Final ===
Sunday, January 28, 2:00 pm

Sheet D	1	2	3	4	5	6	7	8	9	10	Final
Catlin Schneider 🔨	0	0	0	0	0	1	0	3	1	X	5
Jason Montgomery	0	0	0	0	0	0	2	0	0	X	2

2024 BC Men's Curling Championship

Catlin Schneider
1st British Columbia Provincial Championship title
