= 2025 Saville Shootout =

- Host city: Edmonton, Alberta
- Arena: Saville Community Sports Centre
- Dates: September 5–7
- Men's winner: (British Columbia) Team de Jong
- Curling club: Victoria CC, Victoria
- Skip: Cameron de Jong
- Third: Sterling Middleton
- Second: Alex Horvath
- Lead: Corey Chester
- Finalist: (British Columbia) Matthew Blandford
- Women's winner: (Manitoba) Team Einarson
- Curling club: Gimli CC, Gimli
- Skip: Kerri Einarson
- Third: Val Sweeting
- Second: Shannon Birchard
- Lead: Karlee Burgess
- Alternate: Krysten Karwacki
- Coach: Reid Carruthers
- Finalist: (South Korea) Gim Eun-ji

The 2025 edition of the Saville Shootout was held from September 5 to 7 at the Saville Community Sports Centre in Edmonton, Alberta. The event was held in a round robin format with a $25,000 purse on both the men's and women's sides.

Team Cameron de Jong won the men's event, defeating fellow BC rink Matthew Blandford 7–1 in the final. The de Jong rink, with Sterling Middleton, Alex Horvath and Corey Chester finished with a 6–1 record in their first event as a new team, eliminating Norway's Andreas Hårstad in the quarterfinals and the United States' Scott Dunnam in the semifinals. Team Blandford, meanwhile, went 3–1 in the round robin before playoff wins over Saskatchewan's Dustin Kalthoff and Alberta's Johnson Tao. The playoff field was rounded out by the Netherlands' Wouter Gösgens and Alberta's Evan van Amsterdam who both lost out in the quarterfinals.

In the women's final, world number six ranked Manitoba's Kerri Einarson shutout world number five ranked South Korea's Gim Eun-ji in a battle of unbeaten teams. It was the first event of the season for the Einarson squad which saw the return of second Shannon Birchard after a knee injury kept her from competing during the 2024–25 season. After a 4–0 round robin record, the Gimli based team beat South Korea's Park You-been in the quarterfinals and then eliminated Minnesota's Tabitha Peterson in the semis. Team Gim had a similar path to the final with wins over Edmonton's Gracelyn Richards and Serena Gray-Withers in the playoffs. Wang Rui and Kaitlyn Lawes rounded out the playoff field of eight.

== Men ==
=== Teams ===
The teams are listed as follows:

Skip	Third	Second	Lead	Alternate	Locale
James Ballance	Kolby MacDonald	Michael Keenan	Oliver Burton		Okotoks / Edmonton, Alberta
Matthew Blandford	Sébastien Robillard	Cody Johnston	Matthew Fenton		Vancouver, British Columbia
Zachary Davies	Ronan Peterson	William Butler	Adam Naugler		Edmonton, Alberta
Cameron de Jong	Sterling Middleton	Alex Horvath	Corey Chester		Victoria, British Columbia
Scott Dunnam	Cody Clouser	Lance Wheeler	Andrew Dunnam		(United States) Philadelphia, Pennsylvania
Jace Freeman	Dallas Burgess	Ryan Ostrowsky	Aaron Macdonell	Emerson Klimpke	Virden, Manitoba
Wouter Gösgens	Laurens Hoekman	Jaap van Dorp	Tobias van den Hurk	Alexander Magan	Zoetermeer, Netherlands
Andreas Hårstad	Willhelm Næss	Michael Mellemseter	Mathias Brænden		Oppdal, Norway
Jaxon Hiebert	Noah Mason-Wood	Nate Burton	Braeden Hein		Edmonton, Alberta
Peter Hlushak	Sahil Dalrymple	Varyk Doepker	Lucas Sawiak		Edmonton, Alberta
Ryan Jacques	Cole Adams	Derek Bowyer	Tyson Toews		Calgary, Alberta
Dustin Kalthoff (Fourth)	Brent Pierce (Skip) (Note: Brent Pierce skipped Team Kalthoff.)	Josh Heidt	Logan Ede		Saskatoon, Saskatchewan
Chris Kennedy	– (Note: Team Kennedy played with three players.)	Andrew Gittis	John Ritchie		Edmonton, Alberta
Rylan Kleiter	Joshua Mattern	Matthew Hall	Trevor Johnson		Saskatoon, Saskatchewan
Jacob Libbus	Nathan Molberg	Zachary Pawliuk	Michael Hendricks		Edmonton, Alberta
Jordon McDonald	Jacques Gauthier	Elias Huminicki	Cameron Olafson		Winnipeg, Manitoba
Ryan Parent	Jared Jenkins	Ben Savage	Ethan Drysdale		Calgary, Alberta
Samuel Strouse (Fourth)	Kevin Tuma	Chase Sinnett (Skip)	Connor Kauffman	Coleman Thurston	(United States) Chaska, Minnesota
Johnson Tao	Kenan Wipf	Benjamin Morin	Andrew Nowell		Edmonton, Alberta
Evan van Amsterdam	Jeremy Harty	Jason Ginter	Brad Thiessen (Note: Brad Thiessen spared for Parker Konschuh.)		Edmonton, Alberta

=== Round robin standings ===
Final Round Robin Standings

Key
Teams to Playoffs

Pool A	W	L	PF	PA
(Netherlands) Wouter Gösgens	4	0	25	14
(Alberta) Jacob Libbus	2	2	22	29
(Saskatchewan) Rylan Kleiter	2	2	26	22
(Alberta) Ryan Parent	1	3	17	19
(Alberta) Jaxon Hiebert	1	3	14	20

Pool B	W	L	PF	PA
(Alberta) Evan van Amsterdam	3	1	24	19
(British Columbia) Cameron de Jong	3	1	25	18
(Manitoba) Jordon McDonald	2	2	30	21
(Alberta) Peter Hlushak	1	3	13	28
(Alberta) Zachary Davies	1	3	21	27

Pool C	W	L	PF	PA
(Norway) Andreas Hårstad	4	0	22	13
(Alberta) Johnson Tao	2	2	24	18
(Manitoba) Jace Freeman	2	2	19	20
(United States) Chase Sinnett	2	2	17	19
(Alberta) James Ballance	0	4	12	24

Pool D	W	L	PF	PA
(British Columbia) Matthew Blandford	3	1	25	21
(Saskatchewan) Team Kalthoff	3	1	25	21
(United States) Scott Dunnam	3	1	19	12
(Alberta) Ryan Jacques	1	3	19	20
(Alberta) Chris Kennedy	0	4	14	28

=== Round robin results ===
All draw times listed in Mountain Time (UTC−06:00).

==== Draw 1 ====
Friday, September 5, 8:00 am

Sheet 3	1	2	3	4	5	6	7	8	Final
(British Columbia) Cameron de Jong 🔨	0	3	1	1	0	2	X	X	7
(Alberta) Peter Hlushak	0	0	0	0	1	0	X	X	1

Sheet 4	1	2	3	4	5	6	7	8	9	Final
(Manitoba) Jordon McDonald 🔨	2	0	3	0	0	1	1	0	2	9
(Alberta) Zachary Davies	0	2	0	2	1	0	0	2	0	7

Sheet 5	1	2	3	4	5	6	7	8	Final
(Manitoba) Jace Freeman 🔨	0	1	1	0	1	0	2	X	5
(Alberta) James Ballance	0	0	0	2	0	1	0	X	3

Sheet 6	1	2	3	4	5	6	7	8	Final
(United States) Chase Sinnett	0	0	0	2	0	0	X	X	2
(Alberta) Johnson Tao 🔨	0	2	2	0	3	1	X	X	8

Sheet 7	1	2	3	4	5	6	7	8	Final
(British Columbia) Matthew Blandford	2	0	0	1	0	1	0	3	7
(Alberta) Chris Kennedy 🔨	0	0	1	0	2	0	2	0	5

Sheet 8	1	2	3	4	5	6	7	8	9	Final
(Saskatchewan) Team Kalthoff 🔨	0	0	1	0	2	0	3	0	1	7
(Alberta) Ryan Jacques	2	1	0	1	0	1	0	1	0	6

Sheet 9	1	2	3	4	5	6	7	8	Final
(Saskatchewan) Rylan Kleiter 🔨	0	3	0	0	1	1	0	1	6
(Alberta) Ryan Parent	1	0	1	0	0	0	1	0	3

Sheet 10	1	2	3	4	5	6	7	8	Final
(Netherlands) Wouter Gösgens	0	0	0	0	0	2	0	1	3
(Alberta) Jaxon Hiebert 🔨	0	0	0	1	0	0	1	0	2

==== Draw 2 ====
Friday, September 5, 12:15 pm

Sheet 9	1	2	3	4	5	6	7	8	Final
(Alberta) Evan van Amsterdam	0	0	0	0	2	0	2	0	4
(Alberta) Zachary Davies 🔨	2	0	0	1	0	2	0	1	6

Sheet 10	1	2	3	4	5	6	7	8	Final
(Alberta) Jacob Libbus 🔨	3	0	0	2	0	0	2	X	7
(Alberta) Ryan Parent	0	2	2	0	0	1	0	X	5

==== Draw 3 ====
Friday, September 5, 4:30 pm

Sheet 3	1	2	3	4	5	6	7	8	Final
(Saskatchewan) Rylan Kleiter 🔨	2	0	3	3	0	X	X	X	8
(Alberta) Jaxon Hiebert	0	2	0	0	1	X	X	X	3

Sheet 4	1	2	3	4	5	6	7	8	Final
(United States) Scott Dunnam	1	0	0	1	1	0	2	1	6
(British Columbia) Matthew Blandford 🔨	0	2	0	0	0	1	0	0	3

Sheet 5	1	2	3	4	5	6	7	8	Final
(Saskatchewan) Team Kalthoff 🔨	0	0	1	2	0	1	0	1	5
(Alberta) Chris Kennedy	0	0	0	0	1	0	3	0	4

Sheet 6	1	2	3	4	5	6	7	8	Final
(Alberta) Jacob Libbus	2	0	0	1	1	0	0	X	4
(Netherlands) Wouter Gösgens 🔨	0	3	2	0	0	3	2	X	10

Sheet 7	1	2	3	4	5	6	7	8	Final
(Manitoba) Jordon McDonald 🔨	5	0	1	4	2	X	X	X	12
(Alberta) Peter Hlushak	0	1	0	0	0	X	X	X	1

Sheet 8	1	2	3	4	5	6	7	8	Final
(Alberta) Evan van Amsterdam 🔨	0	2	2	1	0	0	2	X	7
(British Columbia) Cameron de Jong	0	0	0	0	3	1	0	X	4

Sheet 9	1	2	3	4	5	6	7	8	Final
(United States) Chase Sinnett 🔨	0	0	1	1	2	0	1	X	5
(Alberta) James Ballance	0	1	0	0	0	1	0	X	2

Sheet 10	1	2	3	4	5	6	7	8	Final
(Norway) Andreas Hårstad 🔨	1	0	1	1	0	1	1	X	5
(Manitoba) Jace Freeman	0	2	0	0	1	0	0	X	3

==== Draw 4 ====
Friday, September 5, 8:45 pm

Sheet 9	1	2	3	4	5	6	7	8	Final
(Norway) Andreas Hårstad 🔨	0	0	0	0	0	3	3	X	6
(Alberta) Johnson Tao	1	1	0	0	0	0	0	X	2

Sheet 10	1	2	3	4	5	6	7	8	Final
(United States) Scott Dunnam	0	1	1	1	0	1	0	X	4
(Alberta) Ryan Jacques 🔨	1	0	0	0	1	0	1	X	3

==== Draw 5 ====
Saturday, September 6, 8:00 am

Sheet 1	1	2	3	4	5	6	7	8	9	Final
(Netherlands) Wouter Gösgens	0	1	0	0	0	1	0	1	1	4
(Alberta) Ryan Parent 🔨	1	0	0	1	0	0	1	0	0	3

Sheet 2	1	2	3	4	5	6	7	8	Final
(Alberta) Evan van Amsterdam 🔨	1	0	1	0	3	0	1	1	7
(Alberta) Peter Hlushak	0	1	0	2	0	1	0	0	4

Sheet 3	1	2	3	4	5	6	7	8	Final
(Norway) Andreas Hårstad	1	0	2	1	0	0	1	1	6
(Alberta) James Ballance 🔨	0	1	0	0	2	1	0	0	4

Sheet 4	1	2	3	4	5	6	7	8	Final
(Alberta) Jacob Libbus	0	2	0	1	0	0	0	0	3
(Alberta) Jaxon Hiebert 🔨	1	0	1	0	2	1	1	1	7

Sheet 5	1	2	3	4	5	6	7	8	Final
(British Columbia) Cameron de Jong	0	1	2	0	3	0	0	1	7
(Alberta) Zachary Davies 🔨	1	0	0	2	0	1	2	0	6

Sheet 6	1	2	3	4	5	6	7	8	Final
(United States) Scott Dunnam	1	0	2	1	4	X	X	X	8
(Alberta) Chris Kennedy 🔨	0	1	0	0	0	X	X	X	1

Sheet 7	1	2	3	4	5	6	7	8	Final
(Manitoba) Jace Freeman 🔨	2	0	1	0	1	0	2	1	7
(Alberta) Johnson Tao	0	3	0	2	0	1	0	0	6

Sheet 8	1	2	3	4	5	6	7	8	Final
(British Columbia) Matthew Blandford 🔨	0	0	1	1	0	2	1	X	5
(Alberta) Ryan Jacques	1	0	0	0	1	0	0	X	2

==== Draw 6 ====
Saturday, September 6, 12:15 pm

Sheet 1	1	2	3	4	5	6	7	8	Final
(Manitoba) Jordon McDonald 🔨	0	2	0	1	0	1	0	X	4
(British Columbia) Cameron de Jong	1	0	2	0	3	0	1	X	7

Sheet 2	1	2	3	4	5	6	7	8	Final
(Saskatchewan) Rylan Kleiter	1	0	2	0	2	0	0	0	5
(Netherlands) Wouter Gösgens 🔨	0	1	0	3	0	2	0	2	8

==== Draw 7 ====
Saturday, September 6, 4:30 pm

Sheet 1	1	2	3	4	5	6	7	8	Final
(United States) Chase Sinnett	0	0	1	0	1	1	1	0	4
(Norway) Andreas Hårstad 🔨	1	0	0	2	0	0	0	2	5

Sheet 2	1	2	3	4	5	6	7	8	Final
(Alberta) Johnson Tao 🔨	4	0	1	0	0	3	X	X	8
(Alberta) James Ballance	0	1	0	1	1	0	X	X	3

Sheet 3	1	2	3	4	5	6	7	8	Final
(Saskatchewan) Team Kalthoff 🔨	2	0	0	0	1	0	2	X	5
(United States) Scott Dunnam	0	0	0	0	0	1	0	X	1

Sheet 4	1	2	3	4	5	6	7	8	Final
(Alberta) Ryan Jacques 🔨	2	0	2	0	0	1	3	X	8
(Alberta) Chris Kennedy	0	2	0	2	0	0	0	X	4

Sheet 5	1	2	3	4	5	6	7	8	9	Final
(Manitoba) Jordon McDonald 🔨	0	0	2	0	1	0	2	0	0	5
(Alberta) Evan van Amsterdam	1	2	0	0	0	1	0	1	1	6

Sheet 6	1	2	3	4	5	6	7	8	Final
(Alberta) Ryan Parent 🔨	1	0	1	0	2	1	1	X	6
(Alberta) Jaxon Hiebert	0	1	0	1	0	0	0	X	2

Sheet 7	1	2	3	4	5	6	7	8	9	Final
(Saskatchewan) Rylan Kleiter 🔨	0	1	0	2	0	2	0	2	0	7
(Alberta) Jacob Libbus	2	0	2	0	1	0	2	0	1	8

Sheet 8	1	2	3	4	5	6	7	8	Final
(Alberta) Zachary Davies 🔨	1	0	1	0	0	0	0	X	2
(Alberta) Peter Hlushak	0	1	0	0	2	3	1	X	7

==== Draw 8 ====
Saturday, September 6, 8:45 pm

Sheet 1	1	2	3	4	5	6	7	8	9	Final
(Saskatchewan) Team Kalthoff	0	0	3	2	0	0	2	1	0	8
(British Columbia) Matthew Blandford 🔨	3	0	0	0	2	3	0	0	2	10

Sheet 2	1	2	3	4	5	6	7	8	Final
(United States) Chase Sinnett 🔨	2	0	0	0	1	0	3	X	6
(Manitoba) Jace Freeman	0	0	0	2	0	2	0	X	4

=== Playoffs ===
Quarterfinals
1	(Netherlands) Wouter Gösgens	5
8	(Alberta) Johnson Tao	7
4	(British Columbia) Matthew Blandford	8
5	(Saskatchewan) Team Kalthoff	5
2	(Norway) Andreas Hårstad	4
7	(British Columbia) Cameron de Jong	5
3	(Alberta) Evan van Amsterdam	3
6	(United States) Scott Dunnam	7

Semifinals
8	(Alberta) Johnson Tao	5
4	(British Columbia) Matthew Blandford	8
7	(British Columbia) Cameron de Jong	7
6	(United States) Scott Dunnam	6

Final
4	(British Columbia) Matthew Blandford	1
7	(British Columbia) Cameron de Jong	7

==== Quarterfinals ====
Sunday, September 7, 8:30 am

Sheet 2	1	2	3	4	5	6	7	8	Final
(British Columbia) Matthew Blandford	2	0	2	0	2	0	1	1	8
(Saskatchewan) Team Kalthoff 🔨	0	1	0	2	0	2	0	0	5

Sheet 4	1	2	3	4	5	6	7	8	Final
(Netherlands) Wouter Gösgens 🔨	2	0	2	0	0	0	1	0	5
(Alberta) Johnson Tao	0	3	0	0	3	0	0	1	7

Sheet 6	1	2	3	4	5	6	7	8	Final
(Norway) Andreas Hårstad 🔨	0	1	0	1	0	2	0	0	4
(British Columbia) Cameron de Jong	0	0	2	0	1	0	0	2	5

Sheet 7	1	2	3	4	5	6	7	8	Final
(Alberta) Evan van Amsterdam 🔨	1	0	2	0	0	0	0	X	3
(United States) Scott Dunnam	0	2	0	1	1	1	2	X	7

==== Semifinals ====
Sunday, September 7, 12:00 pm

Sheet 7	1	2	3	4	5	6	7	8	Final
(Alberta) Johnson Tao	0	2	0	2	0	0	1	0	5
(British Columbia) Matthew Blandford 🔨	0	0	2	0	3	1	0	2	8

Sheet 8	1	2	3	4	5	6	7	8	Final
(British Columbia) Cameron de Jong 🔨	0	2	0	2	1	1	0	1	7
(United States) Scott Dunnam	4	0	1	0	0	0	1	0	6

==== Final ====
Sunday, September 7, 3:30 pm

Sheet 5	1	2	3	4	5	6	7	8	Final
(British Columbia) Matthew Blandford	0	0	1	0	0	0	X	X	1
(British Columbia) Cameron de Jong 🔨	0	3	0	2	1	1	X	X	7

== Women ==
=== Teams ===
The teams are listed as follows:

Skip	Third	Second	Lead	Alternate	Locale
Corryn Brown	Erin Pincott	Sarah Koltun	Samantha Fisher		Kamloops, British Columbia
Kate Cameron	Briane Harris	Taylor McDonald	Mackenzie Elias		St. Adolphe, Manitoba
Emma DeSchiffart	Abby Desormeau	Bethany Evans	Sarah Yarmuch		Edmonton, Alberta
Kerri Einarson	Val Sweeting	Shannon Birchard	Karlee Burgess	Krysten Karwacki	Gimli, Manitoba
Gim Eun-ji	Kim Min-ji	Kim Su-ji	Seol Ye-eun	Seol Ye-ji	Uijeongbu, South Korea
Serena Gray-Withers	Catherine Clifford	Lindsey Burgess	Zoe Cinnamon		Edmonton, Alberta
Nancy Hansen	Trina Ball	Candace Reed	Jenna Jones		Rimbey, Alberta
Jessie Hunkin	Nicky Kaufman	Tammy Cottrell	Crystal Kaufman		Edmonton, Alberta
Kaitlyn Lawes (Fourth)	Selena Njegovan (Skip) (Note: Selena Njegovan skipped Team Lawes.)	Jocelyn Peterman	Kristin Gordon		Winnipeg, Manitoba
Yuina Miura	Kohane Tsuruga	Rin Suzuki	Hana Ikeda	Suzune Yasui	Sapporo, Japan
Park You-been	Lee Eun-chae	Kim Ji-yoon	Yang Seung-hee		Seoul, South Korea
Tabitha Peterson	Cory Thiesse	Tara Peterson	Taylor Anderson-Heide		(United States) Saint Paul, Minnesota
Myla Plett	Alyssa Nedohin	Chloe Fediuk	Allie Iskiw		Edmonton, Alberta
Taylor Reese-Hansen	Megan McGillivray	Kim Bonneau	Julianna Mackenzie		Victoria, British Columbia
Gracelyn Richards	Emma Yarmuch	Sophie Ryhorchuk	Amy Wheatcroft	Rachel Jacques	Edmonton, Alberta
Kayla Skrlik	Margot Flemming	Ashton Skrlik	Geri-Lynn Ramsay		Calgary, Alberta
Amanda Sluchinski	Kate Goodhelpsen	Anna Munroe	Joanne Tarvit		Edmonton, Alberta
Selena Sturmay	Danielle Schmiemann	Dezaray Hawes	Paige Papley		Edmonton, Alberta
Ashley Thevenot	Stephanie Schmidt	Taylor Stremick	Kaylin Skinner		Saskatoon, Saskatchewan
Wang Rui	Han Yu	Dong Ziqi	Jiang Jiayi	Su Tingyu	Beijing, China

=== Round robin standings ===
Final Round Robin Standings

Key
Teams to Playoffs

Pool A	W	L	PF	PA
(Manitoba) Kerri Einarson	4	0	30	12
(United States) Tabitha Peterson	3	1	25	18
(Alberta) Selena Sturmay	2	2	18	23
(Japan) Yuina Miura	1	3	22	27
(Alberta) Jessie Hunkin	0	4	16	31

Pool B	W	L	PF	PA
(South Korea) Gim Eun-ji	4	0	25	16
(South Korea) Park You-been	3	1	23	19
(Saskatchewan) Ashley Thevenot	2	2	29	28
(British Columbia) Corryn Brown	1	3	17	19
(Alberta) Emma DeSchiffart	0	4	20	32

Pool C	W	L	PF	PA
(Manitoba) Team Lawes	4	0	29	12
(Alberta) Gracelyn Richards	2	2	17	25
(British Columbia) Taylor Reese-Hansen	2	2	25	19
(Alberta) Kayla Skrlik	2	2	24	16
(Alberta) Nancy Hansen	0	4	9	32

Pool D	W	L	PF	PA
(China) Wang Rui	4	0	34	15
(Alberta) Serena Gray-Withers	3	1	24	17
(Alberta) Myla Plett	2	2	21	21
(Manitoba) Kate Cameron	1	3	15	27
(Alberta) Amanda Sluchinski	0	4	12	26

=== Round robin results ===
All draw times listed in Mountain Time (UTC−06:00).

==== Draw 1 ====
Friday, September 5, 8:00 am

Sheet 1	1	2	3	4	5	6	7	8	Final
(British Columbia) Corryn Brown	0	0	1	0	1	1	0	X	3
(South Korea) Park You-been 🔨	0	0	0	4	0	0	1	X	5

Sheet 2	1	2	3	4	5	6	7	8	Final
(United States) Tabitha Peterson 🔨	2	0	3	1	0	1	0	0	7
(Japan) Yuina Miura	0	2	0	0	1	0	2	1	6

==== Draw 2 ====
Friday, September 5, 12:15 pm

Sheet 1	1	2	3	4	5	6	7	8	9	Final
(Saskatchewan) Ashley Thevenot 🔨	3	0	2	0	3	0	2	0	2	12
(Alberta) Emma DeSchiffart	0	3	0	3	0	1	0	3	0	10

Sheet 2	1	2	3	4	5	6	7	8	Final
(South Korea) Gim Eun-ji 🔨	1	0	2	0	0	2	2	X	7
(South Korea) Park You-been	0	1	0	1	1	0	0	X	3

Sheet 3	1	2	3	4	5	6	7	8	Final
(British Columbia) Taylor Reese-Hansen 🔨	5	0	0	1	2	X	X	X	8
(Alberta) Nancy Hansen	0	1	0	0	0	X	X	X	1

Sheet 4	1	2	3	4	5	6	7	8	Final
(Alberta) Kayla Skrlik	0	2	1	0	0	1	4	X	8
(Alberta) Gracelyn Richards 🔨	1	0	0	0	2	0	0	X	3

Sheet 5	1	2	3	4	5	6	7	8	Final
(Alberta) Myla Plett 🔨	1	0	0	1	0	1	1	1	5
(Alberta) Amanda Sluchinski	0	0	0	0	1	0	0	0	1

Sheet 6	1	2	3	4	5	6	7	8	Final
(China) Wang Rui	0	0	0	6	0	2	X	X	8
(Alberta) Serena Gray-Withers 🔨	0	1	1	0	1	0	X	X	3

Sheet 7	1	2	3	4	5	6	7	8	Final
(Manitoba) Kerri Einarson 🔨	1	4	0	1	0	3	X	X	9
(Japan) Yuina Miura	0	0	1	0	2	0	X	X	3

Sheet 8	1	2	3	4	5	6	7	8	Final
(Alberta) Selena Sturmay	0	0	1	3	0	2	1	0	7
(Alberta) Jessie Hunkin 🔨	2	2	0	0	1	0	0	1	6

==== Draw 3 ====
Friday, September 5, 4:30 pm

Sheet 1	1	2	3	4	5	6	7	8	Final
(Manitoba) Kate Cameron	0	1	0	0	0	0	X	X	1
(Alberta) Serena Gray-Withers 🔨	0	0	2	1	2	3	X	X	8

Sheet 2	1	2	3	4	5	6	7	8	Final
(Manitoba) Team Lawes 🔨	0	0	3	2	0	0	3	X	8
(Alberta) Gracelyn Richards	0	0	0	0	0	1	0	X	1

==== Draw 4 ====
Friday, September 5, 8:45 pm

Sheet 1	1	2	3	4	5	6	7	8	Final
(Manitoba) Kerri Einarson	1	0	2	1	0	1	3	X	8
(Alberta) Jessie Hunkin 🔨	0	1	0	0	2	0	0	X	3

Sheet 2	1	2	3	4	5	6	7	8	Final
(Manitoba) Kate Cameron 🔨	2	0	1	0	0	1	0	X	4
(Alberta) Myla Plett	0	1	0	2	0	0	3	X	6

Sheet 3	1	2	3	4	5	6	7	8	Final
(China) Wang Rui	0	2	0	1	2	0	3	X	8
(Alberta) Amanda Sluchinski 🔨	1	0	1	0	0	1	0	X	3

Sheet 4	1	2	3	4	5	6	7	8	Final
(United States) Tabitha Peterson	0	0	2	1	0	1	0	1	5
(Alberta) Selena Sturmay 🔨	0	1	0	0	1	0	2	0	4

Sheet 5	1	2	3	4	5	6	7	8	Final
(South Korea) Gim Eun-ji 🔨	2	1	1	0	3	0	0	X	7
(Alberta) Emma DeSchiffart	0	0	0	1	0	2	2	X	5

Sheet 6	1	2	3	4	5	6	7	8	Final
(British Columbia) Corryn Brown	0	2	0	2	0	0	0	X	4
(Saskatchewan) Ashley Thevenot 🔨	2	0	2	0	1	2	1	X	8

Sheet 7	1	2	3	4	5	6	7	8	Final
(Alberta) Kayla Skrlik 🔨	3	1	1	0	0	3	X	X	8
(Alberta) Nancy Hansen	0	0	0	0	1	0	X	X	1

Sheet 8	1	2	3	4	5	6	7	8	Final
(Manitoba) Team Lawes	0	0	1	0	0	3	0	2	6
(British Columbia) Taylor Reese-Hansen 🔨	1	0	0	2	0	0	2	0	5

==== Draw 5 ====
Saturday, September 6, 8:00 am

Sheet 9	1	2	3	4	5	6	7	8	Final
(China) Wang Rui	0	0	3	3	0	3	0	X	9
(Alberta) Myla Plett 🔨	0	4	0	0	1	0	1	X	6

Sheet 10	1	2	3	4	5	6	7	8	Final
(Alberta) Kayla Skrlik 🔨	1	0	1	0	2	1	0	0	5
(British Columbia) Taylor Reese-Hansen	0	4	0	1	0	0	1	1	7

==== Draw 6 ====
Saturday, September 6, 12:15 pm

Sheet 3	1	2	3	4	5	6	7	8	9	Final
(Alberta) Selena Sturmay 🔨	0	1	0	2	0	1	1	0	1	6
(Japan) Yuina Miura	0	0	1	0	3	0	0	1	0	5

Sheet 4	1	2	3	4	5	6	7	8	Final
(British Columbia) Corryn Brown 🔨	0	2	1	1	1	0	1	X	6
(Alberta) Emma DeSchiffart	0	0	0	0	0	1	0	X	1

Sheet 5	1	2	3	4	5	6	7	8	Final
(Manitoba) Team Lawes 🔨	1	0	5	1	1	2	X	X	10
(Alberta) Nancy Hansen	0	3	0	0	0	0	X	X	3

Sheet 6	1	2	3	4	5	6	7	8	Final
(United States) Tabitha Peterson 🔨	3	0	2	3	X	X	X	X	8
(Alberta) Jessie Hunkin	0	2	0	0	X	X	X	X	2

Sheet 7	1	2	3	4	5	6	7	8	Final
(Saskatchewan) Ashley Thevenot 🔨	0	2	0	1	0	0	2	0	5
(South Korea) Park You-been	2	0	1	0	0	2	0	3	8

Sheet 8	1	2	3	4	5	6	7	8	Final
(Manitoba) Kate Cameron	0	3	0	2	1	0	1	X	7
(Alberta) Amanda Sluchinski 🔨	1	0	2	0	0	1	0	X	4

Sheet 9	1	2	3	4	5	6	7	8	Final
(British Columbia) Taylor Reese-Hansen 🔨	0	3	0	0	1	0	1	0	5
(Alberta) Gracelyn Richards	1	0	0	2	0	2	0	2	7

Sheet 10	1	2	3	4	5	6	7	8	Final
(Alberta) Myla Plett	0	0	1	1	1	0	1	0	4
(Alberta) Serena Gray-Withers 🔨	3	0	0	0	0	1	0	3	7

==== Draw 7 ====
Saturday, September 6, 4:30 pm

Sheet 9	1	2	3	4	5	6	7	8	Final
(South Korea) Gim Eun-ji	1	0	0	2	0	0	3	X	6
(Saskatchewan) Ashley Thevenot 🔨	0	2	0	0	0	2	0	X	4

Sheet 10	1	2	3	4	5	6	7	8	Final
(Manitoba) Kerri Einarson 🔨	1	0	1	1	3	1	X	X	7
(Alberta) Selena Sturmay	0	1	0	0	0	0	X	X	1

==== Draw 8 ====
Saturday, September 6, 8:45 pm

Sheet 3	1	2	3	4	5	6	7	8	Final
(Alberta) Kayla Skrlik 🔨	0	1	0	0	1	0	1	0	3
(Manitoba) Team Lawes	1	0	1	1	0	1	0	1	5

Sheet 4	1	2	3	4	5	6	7	8	Final
(Alberta) Gracelyn Richards	0	0	2	3	0	1	0	X	6
(Alberta) Nancy Hansen 🔨	1	1	0	0	1	0	1	X	4

Sheet 5	1	2	3	4	5	6	7	8	Final
(China) Wang Rui 🔨	2	0	0	0	3	4	X	X	9
(Manitoba) Kate Cameron	0	1	1	1	0	0	X	X	3

Sheet 6	1	2	3	4	5	6	7	8	Final
(Alberta) Serena Gray-Withers 🔨	1	0	0	1	0	4	0	X	6
(Alberta) Amanda Sluchinski	0	1	1	0	1	0	1	X	4

Sheet 7	1	2	3	4	5	6	7	8	Final
(South Korea) Gim Eun-ji 🔨	2	1	0	1	0	1	0	0	5
(British Columbia) Corryn Brown	0	0	1	0	1	0	1	1	4

Sheet 8	1	2	3	4	5	6	7	8	Final
(Japan) Yuina Miura 🔨	0	1	0	0	3	2	0	2	8
(Alberta) Jessie Hunkin	0	0	1	2	0	0	2	0	5

Sheet 9	1	2	3	4	5	6	7	8	Final
(Manitoba) Kerri Einarson	0	1	2	0	2	0	0	1	6
(United States) Tabitha Peterson 🔨	1	0	0	2	0	1	1	0	5

Sheet 10	1	2	3	4	5	6	7	8	Final
(South Korea) Park You-been 🔨	1	2	0	2	1	0	1	X	7
(Alberta) Emma DeSchiffart	0	0	2	0	0	2	0	X	4

=== Playoffs ===
Quarterfinals
1	(South Korea) Gim Eun-ji	5
8	(Alberta) Gracelyn Richards	4
4	(Manitoba) Team Lawes	4
5	(Alberta) Serena Gray-Withers	7
2	(Manitoba) Kerri Einarson	8
7	(South Korea) Park You-been	2
3	(China) Wang Rui	4
6	(United States) Tabitha Peterson	8

Semifinals
1	(South Korea) Gim Eun-ji	5
5	(Alberta) Serena Gray-Withers	1
2	(Manitoba) Kerri Einarson	7
6	(United States) Tabitha Peterson	4

Final
1	(South Korea) Gim Eun-ji	0
2	(Manitoba) Kerri Einarson	7

==== Quarterfinals ====
Sunday, September 7, 8:30 am

Sheet 3	1	2	3	4	5	6	7	8	Final
(South Korea) Gim Eun-ji 🔨	0	1	0	1	0	1	0	2	5
(Alberta) Gracelyn Richards	0	0	1	0	2	0	1	0	4

Sheet 5	1	2	3	4	5	6	7	8	Final
(Manitoba) Kerri Einarson 🔨	0	0	1	1	1	0	2	3	8
(South Korea) Park You-been	0	1	0	0	0	1	0	0	2

Sheet 8	1	2	3	4	5	6	7	8	Final
(China) Wang Rui 🔨	2	0	1	0	1	0	0	0	4
(United States) Tabitha Peterson	0	1	0	2	0	2	1	2	8

Sheet 9	1	2	3	4	5	6	7	8	Final
(Manitoba) Team Lawes 🔨	0	1	0	0	2	0	1	0	4
(Alberta) Serena Gray-Withers	1	0	0	3	0	2	0	1	7

==== Semifinals ====
Sunday, September 7, 12:00 pm

Sheet 3	1	2	3	4	5	6	7	8	Final
(Manitoba) Kerri Einarson 🔨	0	2	0	2	0	1	2	X	7
(United States) Tabitha Peterson	0	0	2	0	2	0	0	X	4

Sheet 4	1	2	3	4	5	6	7	8	Final
(South Korea) Gim Eun-ji 🔨	0	1	1	0	1	1	1	X	5
(Alberta) Serena Gray-Withers	0	0	0	1	0	0	0	X	1

==== Final ====
Sunday, September 7, 3:30 pm

Sheet 6	1	2	3	4	5	6	7	8	Final
(South Korea) Gim Eun-ji	0	0	0	0	0	X	X	X	0
(Manitoba) Kerri Einarson 🔨	2	1	2	1	1	X	X	X	7
