= Brayden Carpenter =

Filipino-Canadian curler

- Curler ♂
- Born: 1998 or 1999 (age 26–27)

Team
- Curling club: Victoria CC, Victoria, BC

Curling career
- Member Association: British Columbia; Philippines
- Brier: 1 (2025)
- Pan Continental Championship: 1 (2025)

Brayden Carpenter (born 1998 or 1999) is a Filipino Canadian curler from Richmond, British Columbia.

== Career ==
=== Club ===
Carpenter has played curling at both at the juniors and senior level in Canada. He has played for Team Cameron de Jong at the BC Men's Curling Championship in 2024 and 2025. The team won the 2025 edition, earning them the right to represent British Columbia at the 2025 Montana's Brier.

=== National team ===
Carpenter joined the Philippine curling men's team in August 2025 which attempted to qualify for the 2026 Winter Olympics. His stint was made possible by his mother contacting Curling Pilipinas in December 2024 during a family trip.

The team took part at the 2025 Curling Pre-Olympic Qualification Event in September where Carpenter took the role of the lead, relegating Alan Frei to the alternate role. The team earned a berth in the 2025 Olympic Qualification Event (OQE).

The team took part at the 2025 Pan Continental Curling Championships in October before ending their Olympic qualification bid at the OQE in December.

== Personal life ==
Brayden Carpenter is of Filipino descent through his mother's side of his family. His grandmother Lita Crocker emigrated from Manila to Canada in the 1960s. He obtained his Philippine passport in July 2025. Carpenter is based in Richmond, British Columbia.
