= Sterling Middleton =

Canadian curler

- Curler
- Born: December 8, 1998 (age 27); Fort St. John, British Columbia

Team
- Curling club: Victoria CC, Victoria, BC
- Skip: Matthew Hall
- Third: Sterling Middleton
- Second: Alex Horvath
- Lead: Thomas Thierbach
- Mixed doubles partner: Julianna Mackenzie

Curling career
- Member Association: Alberta (2011–2015; 2024–2025); British Columbia (2013–2024; 2025–present)
- Brier: 2 (2023, 2024)
- Top CTRS ranking: 15th (2022–23; 2023–24)
Medal record
Men's curling
Representing Canada
Winter Youth Olympics
Gold medal – first place	2016 Lillehammer
World Junior Curling Championships
Gold medal – first place	2018 Aberdeen
Gold medal – first place	2019 Liverpool
Representing British Columbia
Canada Winter Games
Bronze medal – third place	2015 Prince George

Sterling Middleton (born December 8, 1998) is a Canadian curler, originally from Fort St. John, British Columbia. He currently plays third on Team Matthew Hall. He is a two-time World Junior champion, three-time Canadian Junior Champion, and Youth Olympic gold medallist.

== Career ==
=== Juniors ===
Growing up in the Peace Region of British Columbia meant that Middleton was eligible to curl competitively out of B.C. and Alberta. Middleton curled for the Falher, Alberta-based Dustin Turcotte rink for two seasons from 2013 to 2015. After seeing him at the 2013 B.C. High School Championship, Middleton was picked up to also play for the Tyler Tardi rink in 2014. The team went on to win the BC qualifier for the 2015 Canada Winter Games. At the 2015 Canada Games, the team picked up a bronze medal.

Middleton was chosen to be play lead on the Canadian team at the 2016 Winter Youth Olympics, along with skip Mary Fay, Tardi and Karlee Burgess. The team steam-rolled through the opposition, winning all 10 of their games before claiming a gold medal for their country. In the mixed doubles event, Middleton was teamed up with New Zealand's Holly Thompson. The pair made it to the quarter-finals before losing to the eventual gold medallists of Yako Matsuzawa of Japan and Philipp Hösli of Switzerland.

Middleton fully joined the Tardi junior men's rink in 2016, playing third on the rink. The team won the provincial junior title in 2017. Representing British Columbia at the 2017 Canadian Junior Curling Championships, the team lost one round robin game en route to winning the national championship, defeating Ontario's Matthew Hall rink in the final. The team represented Canada at the 2017 World Junior Curling Championships, where they finished the round robin with a 6–3 record, but lost to Norway in a tiebreaker game. That year, Tardi and Middleton also represented British Columbia at the 2017 Canadian U18 Curling Championships, losing just one round robin game. However, they were not successful in the playoffs, losing in the semifinal, but rebounded in the bronze medal game, defeating Saskatchewan's Rylan Kleiter.

In 2018, the Tardi rink won another provincial junior title. At the 2018 Canadian Junior Curling Championships, the team would defend their title. After losing three round robin games, the team had to fight through a tiebreaker before winning two playoff games, including defeating Northern Ontario's Tanner Horgan rink in the final. The team represented Canada at the 2018 World Junior Curling Championships, where they were much more successful. The team lost two round robin games, and won both playoff games, including defeating Scotland in the final to claim the gold medal.

In 2019, Team Tardi won yet another provincial junior title. At the 2019 Canadian Junior Curling Championships, the team won their third-straight national championship. The team lost just one game en route to the title, and defeated Manitoba's J.T. Ryan in the final. The team once again represented Canada at the 2019 World Junior Curling Championships. After posting a 7–2 round robin record, they won both playoff games, including defeating Switzerland's Marco Hösli rink in the final.

The 2019-20 curling season would have been the team's last year of junior eligibility, but they decided to make the jump to men's curling full-time, eschewing the junior ranks.

Outside of the Tardi rink, Middleton won the CCAA/Curling Canada College Curling Championships in 2018, playing third on the Douglas College curling team.

=== Men's ===
While in juniors, the Tardi rink also played in men's events on the World Curling Tour. The team won their first tour event at the 2016 Prestige Hotels & Resorts Curling Classic. They played in his first Grand Slam event at the 2018 Humpty's Champions Cup by virtue of winning the World Junior championship. They went 1–3 at the event, missing the playoffs. They won another tour event to begin the next season at the 2018 King Cash Spiel. The team qualified for the 2019 Champions Cup by winning the World Juniors again. There, the team went win-less in their four matches. In their first post-junior season, Team Tardi won the 2019 Prestige Hotels & Resorts Curling Classic, and the next season, they won the 2020 Raymond James Kelowna Double Cash event.

Middleton played in his first BC Men's Curling Championship in 2017 as a member of Team Tardi, going 3-3 at the event. The rink didn't enter playdowns in 2018, but were back at it at the 2019 BC Men's Curling Championship. There, the team were eliminated after posting a 2–3 record. They finally made the playoffs at the 2020 BC Men's Curling Championship, where they lost in the final to Jim Cotter.

Team Tardi did not play in any major events in the 2020–21 curling season due to the COVID-19 pandemic. The next season, they played at the 2021 Canadian Olympic Curling Pre-Trials. After finishing group play with a 4–2 record, they lost in the B quarter-finals to Glenn Howard. The team played at the 2022 BC Men's Curling Championship, where they were eliminated in the C1 vs. C2 page playoff game against Jim Cotter.

The Tardi rink disbanded in 2022. It was later announced that Middleton had joined the Jacques Gauthier rink for the 2022-23 curling season. In their first season together, the team won the 2023 BC Men's Curling Championship and represented British Columbia at the 2023 Tim Hortons Brier. At the Brier, the team finished with a 3–5 record. After Gauthier announced that he would be joining the Kevin Koe rink in Alberta, Middleton, Ginter, and Horvath announced they would be bringing in Catlin Schneider to skip their team for the 2023-24 curling season. In their first season together, they defended their title at the 2024 BC Men's Curling Championship, representing BC at the 2024 Brier. There, they would slightly improve their record from last year, finishing with a 4–4 record, but still missing the playoffs. When Schneider announced he would be returning to Saskatchewan at the end of the season, Middleton and Ginter announced they would be joining the Evan van Amsterdam rink out of Alberta. In Alberta, the van Amsterdam team had a good season, qualifying for the 2025 Boston Pizza Cup, the Alberta men's curling championship. At the provincial championship, the team would finish in second, losing to Kevin Koe in the final 9–5.

Middleton would move back to British Columbia for the 2025-26 curling season, reuniting with former teammate Horvath, and joining the new Cameron de Jong team. The new de Jong team would start the season off strong, winning the 2025 Saville Shootout 7–1 over Matthew Blandford in the final.

== Personal life ==
Middleton lived in New Westminster, British Columbia, moving to the Lower Mainland in 2016. In 2022, he worked as a pro shop assistant at a golf course in North Vancouver. He currently works as a club professional at the Victoria Curling Club, and lives in Victoria.

== Teams ==
Season	Skip	Third	Second	Lead
2013–14	Dustin Turcotte	Sterling Middleton	Bradley Limoges	Steven Brulotte
2014–15	Dustin Turcotte	Sterling Middleton	Bradley Limoges	Steven Brulotte
2015–16	Mark Zahacy	Sterling Middleton	Doug Scott	–
2016–17	Tyler Tardi	Sterling Middleton	Jordan Tardi	Nick Meister
2017–18	Tyler Tardi	Sterling Middleton	Jordan Tardi	Zac Curtis
2018–19	Tyler Tardi	Sterling Middleton	Matthew Hall	Alex Horvath
2019–20	Tyler Tardi	Sterling Middleton	Jordan Tardi	Alex Horvath
2020–21	Tyler Tardi	Sterling Middleton	Jason Ginter	Jordan Tardi
2021–22	Tyler Tardi	Sterling Middleton	Jason Ginter	Jordan Tardi
2022–23	Jacques Gauthier	Sterling Middleton	Jason Ginter	Alex Horvath
2023–24	Catlin Schneider	Jason Ginter	Sterling Middleton	Alex Horvath
2024–25	Evan van Amsterdam	Jason Ginter	Sterling Middleton	Parker Konschuh
2025–26	Cameron de Jong	Sterling Middleton	Alex Horvath	Corey Chester
2026–27	Matthew Hall	Sterling Middleton	Alex Horvath	Thomas Thierbach
