= Corey Chester =

Canadian curler

- Curler
- Born: March 15, 1992 (age 34); Victoria, British Columbia

Team
- Curling club: Victoria CC, Victoria, BC

Curling career
- Member Association: British Columbia
- Brier: 2 (2022, 2025)
- Top CTRS ranking: 18th (2025–26)

Corey Chester (born March 15, 1992) is a Canadian curler from Victoria, British Columbia.

== Career ==
=== Youth ===
Chester first achieved success in 2007 when he won the BC juvenile boys' championship. Later on in juniors, he represented British Columbia at two Canadian Junior Curling Championships in 2012 and 2013. In 2012, his team, led by Josh Hozack, finished at the bottom of the standings with a 1–11 record, defeating Newfoundland and Labrador in their sole victory. The following year, his rink, now skipped by Tyler Klymchuk, qualified for the championship round and finished in seventh with a 4–6 record. Also, while attending the University of Victoria, Chester skipped the Victoria Vikes to a bronze medal at the 2016 CIS/CCA Curling Championships.

=== Men's ===
Out of juniors, Chester joined the Chris Baier rink at second. In their first season together, this team qualified for the 2014 Canadian Direct Insurance BC Men's Curling Championship through the open qualification round and finished with a 1–3 record. The next season, the team found success on the BC tour, reaching the semifinals at both the Cloverdale Cash Spiel and the Vancouver Island Shootout. They also qualified again for the provincial championship, however, finished 0–3 in the triple knockout bracket.

From 2015 to 2018, Chester played second on the Glen Jackson rink which also included Andrew Komlodi and Joel Cave. After qualifying for the 2016 Canadian Direct Insurance BC Men's Curling Championship through the final qualification event, the team went 5–2 through the triple knockout, advancing to the playoff round. They then lost 5–2 to Dean Joanisse in the 3 vs. 4 game, eliminating them from contention. The following season, Team Jackson again had a strong provincial run, this time reaching the semifinals where they were again eliminated by Team Joanisse, settling for third. In their final season together, they were eliminated by the Joanisse rink for a third time in the C qualifier of the 2018 belairdirect BC Men's Curling Championship.

Chester reunited with his junior skip Tyler Klymchuk after parting ways with Team Jackson. This arrangement only lasted one season, however, with Chester then joining the Jeff Richard rink for the 2019–20 season. This proved to be the correct move as Team Richard reached the final of the Kelowna Double Cash, the semifinals of the King Cash Spiel and Prestige Hotels & Resorts Curling Classic and the quarterfinals of the Red Deer Curling Classic. At the provincial championship, the team started with two straight wins before losing their next three games to be eliminated.

After the COVID-19 pandemic cancelled the majority of the 2020–21 season, Chester joined the Paul Cseke rink for the 2021–22 season. This team had some tour success, reaching two semifinals in Kelowna and Maple Ridge. In the new year, the team played in the 2022 BC Men's Curling Championship where they defeated the higher ranked Jim Cotter and Tyler Tardi rinks to become the A qualifier. This qualified them for the 1 vs. 2 game where they beat Chester's former skip Jeff Richard. Facing Richard again in the final, the Cseke rink lost their first and only game of the week, giving up three in an extra end to lose 11–8. Despite this, Chester still got to participate in the 2022 Tim Hortons Brier as alternate for Team Richard, his first appearance at the Canadian men's championship. There, Team BC finished fifth in their pool with a 4–4 record. Chester continued playing with Cseke for the next two seasons, however, they never attained the same level of success as in 2022, missing the playoffs at the provincial championship in both 2023 and 2024.

Chester joined the Cameron de Jong rink as second for the 2024-25 season, playing with Alex Horvath and Brayden Carpenter. The team found immediate success, winning their first 2025 BC Men's Curling Championship, beating Glenn Venance 10–8 in the final. This win qualified the rink to represent BC at the 2025 Montana's Brier as the home team in Kelowna. At the Brier, the team finished with a disappointing 2–6 record. The de Jong team announced at the end of the season that they would be parting ways with Carpenter, and Sterling Middleton would join the team as the new third for the 2025-26 curling season. The new de Jong team would start the season off strong, winning the 2025 Saville Shootout 7–1 over Matthew Blandford in the final.

=== Mixed doubles ===
Chester found his first success in mixed doubles when he won the 2020 BC Mixed Doubles Curling Championship with partner Stephanie Jackson-Baier. Because the 2020 national championship was cancelled due to the COVID-19 pandemic, the pair represented BC the following year at the 2021 Canadian Mixed Doubles Curling Championship. There, they finished in last place in their pool with a 1–5 record, defeating Nancy Martin and Tyrel Griffith in their lone win. He then started playing doubles with Taylor Reese-Hansen for the 2022–23 season. This pairing found immediate success by going undefeated to claim the Nanaimo Double Doubles Spiel. Later that season, they made it to the provincial final where they were defeated by Sarah Loken and Cody Tanaka.

To begin the 2023–24 season, Reese-Hansen and Chester won the Victoria Mixed Doubles Cash Spiel and reached the semifinals of the Chilliwack Championship. Chester then paired with Hannah Durrant to reach the semifinals of the Parksville Double Doubles Spiel before reuniting with Reese-Hansen to reach the final of the first Alberta Curling Series doubles event. In December, the duo won their first mixed doubles provincial as a team, downing Gabby Brissette and Sterling Middleton 10–2 in the championship game. This sent them to the 2024 Canadian Mixed Doubles Curling Championship where they topped their pool with a 6–1 record, earning a direct bye into the quarterfinal round. They then lost 7–5 to Madison and Rylan Kleiter, eliminating them from contention. The following season, Chester won in Victoria with Mahra Harris and in Parksville with Reese-Hansen, giving him two more tour titles. Despite not winning one of the direct-entry berths into the 2025 Canadian Mixed Doubles Curling Olympic Trials, Reese-Hansen and Chester qualified for the Trials as the third highest ranked team on the points standings that was not already qualified. There, they finished sixth in their pool with a 2–5 record.

== Personal life ==
Chester is employed as a financial analyst for the ministry of environmental and climate change strategy at the Government of British Columbia. He graduated from the University of Victoria with a commerce degree.

== Teams ==
Season	Skip	Third	Second	Lead
2010–11	Stu Merrifield	Corey Chester	Ian Hardy	Tyler O'Brien
2011–12	Josh Hozack	Corey Chester	Nolan Reid	Zachary Capron
2012–13	Tyler Klymchuk	Corey Chester	Sanjay Bowry	Rhys Gamache
2013–14	Chris Baier	Josh Hozack	Corey Chester	Andrew Komlodi
2014–15	Michael Johnson (Fourth)	Chris Baier (Skip)	Corey Chester	Sanjay Bowry
2015–16	Glen Jackson	Andrew Komlodi	Corey Chester	Joel Cave
2016–17	Glen Jackson	Andrew Komlodi	Corey Chester	Joel Cave
2017–18	Glen Jackson	Andrew Komlodi	Corey Chester	Joel Cave
2018–19	Tyler Klymchuk	Corey Chester	Kyle Habkirk	Rhys Gamache
2019–20	Jeff Richard	Tyler Klymchuk	Corey Chester	Rhys Gamache
2020–21	Paul Cseke	Tyrel Griffith	Corey Chester	John Cullen
2021–22	Paul Cseke	Corey Chester	Jay Wakefield	Ryan Cassidy
2022–23	Paul Cseke	Corey Chester	Jay Wakefield	Ty Russell
2023–24	Corey Chester	Paul Cseke	Jay Wakefield	Ty Russell
2024–25	Cameron de Jong	Alex Horvath	Corey Chester	Brayden Carpenter
2025–26	Cameron de Jong	Sterling Middleton	Alex Horvath	Corey Chester
