= Alex Horvath (curler) =

Canadian curler (born 1998)

- Curler
- Born: February 26, 1998 (age 28); Victoria, British Columbia

Team
- Curling club: Victoria CC, Victoria, BC
- Skip: Matthew Hall
- Third: Sterling Middleton
- Second: Alex Horvath
- Lead: Thomas Thierbach
- Mixed doubles partner: Sasha Wilson

Curling career
- Member Association: British Columbia
- Brier: 3 (2023, 2024, 2025)
- Top CTRS ranking: 15th (2022–23; 2023–24)
Medal record
Men's curling
Representing Canada
World Junior Curling Championships
Gold medal – first place	2019 Liverpool

Alexander Justin Bruce Horvath (born February 26, 1998) is a Canadian curler from Victoria, British Columbia. He currently plays second on Team Matthew Hall. He is a former Canadian and World Junior champion.

== Career ==
Horvath first curled competitively on the national level at the 2014 Canadian Junior Curling Championships. That season, Horvath played lead on the Cameron de Jong rink that won the BC Junior men's title. Representing British Columbia at the Canadian Juniors, the de Jong-led rink finished the event with a 5–5 record.

Horvath joined the two-time Canadian Junior and defending World Junior champion Tyler Tardi rink in 2018, playing lead on the team. The rink began the season by winning the 2018 King Cash Spiel World Curling Tour event. Later on in the season, the team won another provincial junior title. At the 2019 Canadian Junior Curling Championships, the team won championship, Horvath's lone national junior title, but the third-straight for Tardi. The team lost just one game en route to the title, and defeated Manitoba's J.T. Ryan in the final. The team represented Canada at the 2019 World Junior Curling Championships. After posting a 7–2 round robin record, they won both playoff games, including defeating Switzerland's Marco Hösli rink in the final. The team played in the 2019 BC Men's Curling Championship as well that season, where they were eliminated after posting a 2–3 record. The team wrapped up the season by playing in the 2019 Champions Cup Grand Slam event, which they qualified for by winning the World Juniors that season. There, the team went win-less in their four matches.

Horvath also won a BC Mixed Championship in 2019, throwing second on a team skipped by Cameron de Jong. The team represented British Columbia at the 2020 Canadian Mixed Curling Championship, going 5-5.

The 2019-20 curling season would have been the team's last year of junior eligibility, but they decided to make the jump to men's curling full-time, eschewing the junior ranks. In their first post-junior season, Team Tardi won the 2019 Prestige Hotels & Resorts Curling Classic on the World Curling Tour. The team also made the playoffs at the 2020 BC Men's Curling Championship, where they lost in the final to Jim Cotter. The season abruptly ended due to the COVID-19 pandemic, and Horvath was replaced by Jason Ginter on the team for the following abbreviated season.

Horvath joined the Jacques Gauthier rink for the 2022-23 curling season. In their first season together, the team won the 2023 BC Men's Curling Championship and represented British Columbia at the 2023 Tim Hortons Brier. At the Brier, the team finished with a 3-5 record. The Gauthier team broke up after the season, with Gauthier heading to Alberta to curl with Kevin Koe.

Horvath re-joined former teammate de Jong as third for the 2024-25 season, playing with Corey Chester and Brayden Carpenter. The team found immediate success, winning their first 2025 BC Men's Curling Championship, beating Glenn Venance 10–8 in the final. This win qualified the de Jong rink to represent BC at the 2025 Montana's Brier as the home team in Kelowna. The de Jong team announced at the end of the season that they would be parting ways with Carpenter, and re-uniting with former teammate Sterling Middleton, who would join the team as the new third for the 2025-26 curling season. The new de Jong team would start the season off strong, winning the 2025 Saville Shootout 7–1 over Matthew Blandford in the final.

== Personal life ==
Horvath works as an ice technician at the Victoria and Esquimalt Curling Clubs. He began curling at age three, and has claimed he was conceived after his parents "drank too many paralyzers" at an Esquimalt curling tournament.

Outside of men's curling, Horvath coached the University of Victoria women's curling team in 2023.

== Teams ==
Season	Skip	Third	Second	Lead
2013–14	Cameron de Jong	Brook Calibaba	Ryan Cassidy	Alex Horvath
2015–16	Cameron de Jong	Joe Wallingham	Alex Horvath	Deryk Kuny
2016–17	Miles Craig	Cameron de Jong	Alex Horvath	Wes Craig
2017–18	Miles Craig	Cameron de Jong	Alex Horvath	Wes Craig
2018–19	Tyler Tardi	Sterling Middleton	Matthew Hall	Alex Horvath
2019–20	Tyler Tardi	Sterling Middleton	Jordan Tardi	Alex Horvath
2020–21	Sébastien Robillard	Cody Tanaka	Nathan Small	Alex Horvath
2021–22	Matthew McCrady	Alex Horvath	Brayden Carpenter	Logan Miron
2022–23	Jacques Gauthier	Sterling Middleton	Jason Ginter	Alex Horvath
2023–24	Catlin Schneider	Jason Ginter	Sterling Middleton	Alex Horvath
2024–25	Cameron de Jong	Alex Horvath	Corey Chester	Brayden Carpenter
2025–26	Cameron de Jong	Sterling Middleton	Alex Horvath	Corey Chester
2026–27	Matthew Hall	Sterling Middleton	Alex Horvath	Thomas Thierbach
