= Victoria Curling Club =

Curling club in Victoria, British Columbia

Coordinates: 48.4315°N 123.3588°W

- Interactive map of Victoria Curling Club
- Location: 1952 Quadra Street; Victoria, British Columbia; V8T 4C2
- Arena: Victoria Curling Club

Information
- Club type: Dedicated ice
- Sheets of ice: 8
- Rock colours: Blue and Red
- Website: http://victoriacurlingclub.com/

Exterior of the Victoria Curling Club in 2026

The Victoria Curling Club was founded as the club signed a lease for land with the City of Victoria, British Columbia, Canada in 1950. However, construction did not commence until 1952 as material shortages from the Korean War had caused delays. Still the Victoria Curling Club opened in February 1953 with eight sheets of ice.

== Victoria CC Champions ==
1958 - BC Men's Champions - Tony Gutoski, Bill Dunstan, Gary Leibel, Dale Dalziel

1969 – BC Senior Men's Champions - Gordon Moore, Dick Pick, L. Perlette, Joe Leibel

1971 – BC Senior Men's Champions - Gordon Moore, Gordon Hooey, Dick Pick, Jack Smith

1972 – BC Senior Men's Champions - Gordon Walker, W. Winkler, O. Powell, Elmer Hoffman

1974 - BC & Canadian Senior Women's Champions - Flora Martin, Edna Messum, Doreen Baker, Betty Stubbs

1975 - BC & Canadian Senior Women's Champions - Flora Martin, Edna Messum, Doreen Baker, Betty Stubbs

1979 - BC & Canadian Senior Women's Champions - Flora Martin, Elsie Humphrey, Verle McKeown, Edna Messum

1980 - BC & Canadian Senior Women's Champions - Flora Martin, Elsie Humphrey, Verle McKeown, Edna Messum

1980 – BC Men's Champions - Tim Horrigan, Lowell Goulden, Kelly Horrigan, Dave Smith

1981 - BC & Canadian Senior Women's Champions - Flora Martin, Elsie Humphrey, Verle McKeown, Edna Messum

1981 – BC Mixed Champions - Don Nemeth, Pat Sanders, Lowell Goulden, Lana Lacheur

1983 – BC Mixed Champions - Steve Skillings, Pat Sanders, Al Carlson, Lea Cooke

1985 – BC Junior Women's Champions - Georgina Hawkes, Christine Stevenson, Tracey Barwick, Deb Massullo

1985 – BC & Canadian Mixed Champions - Steve Skillings, Pat Sanders, Al Carlson, Louise Herlinveaux

1987 – BC, Canadian & World Women's Champions - Pat Sanders, Georgina Hawkes, Louise Herlinveaux, Deb Massullo

1987 – BC Senior Women's Champions - Dorthy Fukuyama, Eileen Williams, Grace McNutt, Ivy McLeod

1988 – BC & Canadian Junior Men's Champions - Mike Wood, Mike Bradley, Todd Troyer, Greg Hawkes

1989 – BC Women's Champions - Julie Sutton, Pat Sanders, Georgina Hawkes, Melissa Soligo

1989 – BC Mixed Champions - Steve Skillings, Pat Sanders, Al Carlson, Georgina Hawkes

1991 - BC & Canadian Women's Champions - Julie Sutton, Jodie Sutton, Melissa Soligo, Karri Willms

1992 – Winter Olympic Bronze Medallists - Julie Sutton, Jodie Sutton, Melissa Soligo, Karri Willms

1993 - BC Women's Champions - Julie Sutton, Jodie Sutton, Melissa Soligo, Karri Willms

1993 – BC Mixed Champions - Steve Streifel, Georgina Hawkes, Sean Cromarty, Cheryl Noble

1995 – BC Junior Women's Champions - Michelle Harding, Shalegh Beddington, Denise Byers, Kim Danderfer

1996 – BC Junior Women's Champions - Jenna Richard, Michelle Harding, Shalegh Beddington, Denise Byers

1998 – BC Junior Women's Champions - Melody Chilibeck, Paulene Levasseur, Vicki Cannon, Denise Lavasseur

1999 – BC Women's Champions - Pat Sanders, Michelle Harding, Cindy Tucker, Denise Byers

2001 – BC Junior Women's Champions - Allison Shivas, Diana Shivas, Steph Jackson, Heather Shivas

2001 – BC Men's Champions - Dean Joanisse, Jay Tuson, Glen Jackson, Randy Tervo

2002 - BC Junior Women's Champions - Allison Shivas, Diana Shivas, Steph Jackson, Heather Shivas

2004 – BC Junior Men's Champions - Chris Baier, Will Sutton, Ryan Campbell, Andrew McMullen

2005 – BC Junior Women's Champions - Sarah Wark, Darah Provençal, Steph Jackson, Sarah Neal

2006 – BC Junior Women's Champions - Kirsten Fox, Steph Jackson, Angela Miller, Erin Fox

2007 - BC Junior Women's Champions - Dailene Sivertson, Steph Jackson, Kristen Mitchell, Megan Reid

2007 - BC Men's Champions - Dean Joanisse, Mike Wood, Dave Nantes, Chris Atchison

2007 - BC Juvenile Boys Champions - Joel Cave, Ian Hardy, Tyler O'Brien, Corey Chester

2023 BC Men's Champions - Jacques Gauthier, Sterling Middleton, Jason Ginter, Alex Horvath

2024 BC Men's Champions - Catlin Schneider, Jason Ginter, Sterling Middleton, Alex Horvath
