= 2023 Curlers Corner Autumn Gold Curling Classic =

- Host city: Calgary, Alberta
- Arena: Calgary Curling Club
- Dates: October 6–9
- Winner: (South Korea) Team Gim
- Curling club: Uijeongbu CC, Uijeongbu
- Skip: Gim Eun-ji
- Third: Kim Min-ji
- Second: Kim Su-ji
- Lead: Seol Ye-eun
- Alternate: Seol Ye-ji
- Coach: Shin Dong-ho
- Finalist: (Japan) Miori Nakamura

The 2023 Curlers Corner Autumn Gold Curling Classic was held from October 6 to 9 at the Calgary Curling Club in Calgary, Alberta. The event was held in a triple-knockout format with a purse of $45,000.

In the final, Gim Eun-ji's Korean championship rink of Kim Min-ji, Kim Su-ji, Seol Ye-eun and Seol Ye-ji successfully defended their 2022 title, scoring an 8–3 win over Japan's Miori Nakamura. The Korean champions opened with a count of two in the opening end. Nakamura then blanked before taking one in the third. Gim extended her lead with three in the fourth before the Japanese responded with two in the fifth. It wouldn't be enough, however, as the Korean side added three more in the sixth to secure the win. Gim was dominant through the event, qualifying through the A event with a 4–0 record. They then beat Jessie Hunkin in the quarterfinals and upended Beth Peterson in the semifinals to reach the final. Team Nakamura qualified for the playoffs through the C side before upsetting Japanese rivals Satsuki Fujisawa in the quarters and knocking off Corryn Brown in the semis. Tabitha Peterson and Michèle Jäggi also qualified for the playoffs but lost in the quarterfinals. It was Team Gim's first tour win of the season.

== Teams ==
The teams are listed as follows:

Skip	Third	Second	Lead	Alternate	Locale
Emira Abbes	Mia Höhne	Lena Kapp	Maike Beer		Füssen, Germany
Skylar Ackerman	Ashley Thevenot	Taylor Stremick	Kaylin Skinner		Saskatoon, Saskatchewan
Kaitlyn Bowman	Hannah Phillips	Anna Munroe	Sasha Tran		Calgary, Alberta
Corryn Brown	Erin Pincott	Jennifer Armstrong	Samantha Fisher		Kamloops, British Columbia
Kate Cameron	Meghan Walter	Taylor McDonald	Mackenzie Elias		Winnipeg, Manitoba
Stephanie Schmidt (Fourth)	Sara England	Ashley Williamson	Michelle Englot (Skip)		Regina, Saskatchewan
Satsuki Fujisawa	Chinami Yoshida	Yumi Suzuki	Yurika Yoshida	Kotomi Ishizaki	Kitami, Japan
Jo-Ann Rizzo (Fourth)	Sarah Koltun	Margot Flemming	Kerry Galusha (Skip)		Yellowknife, Northwest Territories
Gim Eun-ji	Kim Min-ji	Kim Su-ji	Seol Ye-eun	Seol Ye-ji	Uijeongbu, South Korea
Serena Gray-Withers	Catherine Clifford	Brianna Cullen	Zoe Cinnamon		Edmonton, Alberta
Ha Seung-youn	Kim Hye-rin	Yang Tae-i	Kim Su-jin		Chuncheon, South Korea
Amber Holland	Kim Schneider	Jill Springer	Debbie Lozinski		Kronau, Saskatchewan
Jessie Hunkin	Jessie Haughian	Becca Hebert	Dayna Demmans		Spruce Grove, Alberta
Chelsea Carey (Note: Chelsea Carey spared for Team Jäggi who only had three players.)	Michèle Jäggi	Stefanie Berset	Lisa Muhmenthaler		Bern, Switzerland
Jeong Min-jae	Kim Su-hyeon	Ahn Jeong-yeon	Kang Min-hyo		Uiseong, South Korea
Miyu Ueno (Fourth)	Yui Ueno	Junko Nishimuro	Asuka Kanai (Skip)	Mone Ryokawa	Karuizawa, Japan
Kim Min-seo	Jeong Jae-hee	Kim Ji-soo	Song Yu-jin		Jeonbuk, South Korea
Abby Marks	Elysa Crough	Kim Bonneau	Julianna Mackenzie		Edmonton, Alberta
Nancy Martin	Lindsay Bertsch	Madison Kleiter	Krysten Karwacki		Martensville, Saskatchewan
Morgan Muise	Olivia Jones	Sydney Libbus	Emma Wiens		Edmonton, Alberta
Misaki Tanaka (Fourth)	Miori Nakamura (Skip)	Haruka Kihara	Hiyori Ichinohe	Yuuna Harada	Aomori, Japan
Park You-been	Lee Eun-chae	Yang Seung-hee	Kim Ji-yoon		Seoul, South Korea
Beth Peterson	Kelsey Rocque	Katherine Doerksen	Melissa Gordon-Kurz	Jenna Loder	Winnipeg, Manitoba
Tabitha Peterson	Cory Thiesse	Becca Hamilton	Tara Peterson		(United States) St. Paul, Minnesota
Taylor Reese-Hansen	Megan McGillivray	Dailene Pewarchuk	Cierra Fisher	Sydney Brilz	Victoria, British Columbia
Kayla Skrlik	Brittany Tran	Geri-Lynn Ramsay	Ashton Skrlik		Calgary, Alberta
Selena Sturmay	Danielle Schmiemann	Dezaray Hawes	Paige Papley		Edmonton, Alberta
Momoha Tabata	Miku Nihira	Sae Yamamoto	Mikoto Nakajima	Ayami Ito	Sapporo, Japan
Rhonda Varnes	Joanne Tarvit	Mikaylah Lyburn	Cheyenne Ehnes	Dayna Lea	Winnipeg, Manitoba
Jodi Vaughan	Marla Sherrer	Chantele Broderson	Valerie Ekelund		Lethbridge, Alberta
Kristy Watling	Laura Burtnyk	Emily Deschenes	Sarah Pyke		Winnipeg, Manitoba
Jessica Wytrychowski	Quinn Prodaniuk	Sharla Warawa	Dacey Brown	Sarah Brown	Airdrie, Alberta

== Knockout Brackets ==
=== A Event ===
First Knockout	Qualifier 1
(Japan) Satsuki Fujisawa	5
(South Korea) Jeong Min-jae	1	(Japan) Satsuki Fujisawa	8
(Alberta) Abby Marks	3	(Germany) Emira Abbes	0
(Germany) Emira Abbes	7	(Japan) Satsuki Fujisawa	5
(Alberta) Serena Gray-Withers	8	(British Columbia) Taylor Reese-Hansen	2
(Alberta) Jessica Wytrychowski	3	(Alberta) Serena Gray-Withers	6
(Switzerland) Team Jäggi	3	(British Columbia) Taylor Reese-Hansen	9
(British Columbia) Taylor Reese-Hansen	6	(Japan) Satsuki Fujisawa	8
(Manitoba) Kate Cameron	6	(Northwest Territories) Kerry Galusha	1
(Alberta) Kaitlyn Bowman	5	(Manitoba) Kate Cameron	2
(Manitoba) Beth Peterson	6	(Manitoba) Beth Peterson	7
(Japan) Momoha Tabata	3	(Manitoba) Beth Peterson	1
(South Korea) Ha Seung-youn	6	(Northwest Territories) Kerry Galusha	7
(South Korea) Kim Min-seo	2	(South Korea) Ha Seung-youn	6
(Northwest Territories) Kerry Galusha	6	(Northwest Territories) Kerry Galusha	9
(Saskatchewan) Michelle Englot	3

First Knockout	Qualifier 2
(South Korea) Gim Eun-ji	7
(Alberta) Morgan Muise	1	(South Korea) Gim Eun-ji	7
(Alberta) Selena Sturmay	5	(Alberta) Selena Sturmay	5
(Japan) Asuka Kanai	4	(South Korea) Gim Eun-ji	7
(Alberta) Jessie Hunkin	9	(Alberta) Jessie Hunkin	4
(Alberta) Jodi Vaughan	3	(Alberta) Jessie Hunkin	5
(Saskatchewan) Nancy Martin	2	(Saskatchewan) Amber Holland	3
(Saskatchewan) Amber Holland	7	(South Korea) Gim Eun-ji	7
(United States) Tabitha Peterson	9	(British Columbia) Corryn Brown	5
(South Korea) Park You-been	2	(United States) Tabitha Peterson	6
(Saskatchewan) Skylar Ackerman	2	(Manitoba) Kristy Watling	5
(Manitoba) Kristy Watling	8	(United States) Tabitha Peterson	1
(Alberta) Kayla Skrlik	9	(British Columbia) Corryn Brown	7
(Manitoba) Rhonda Varnes	3	(Alberta) Kayla Skrlik	4
(British Columbia) Corryn Brown	6	(British Columbia) Corryn Brown	9
(Japan) Miori Nakamura	4

=== B Event ===
Second Knockout	To Qualifier 3
(Alberta) Kayla Skrlik	9
(South Korea) Jeong Min-jae	5	(South Korea) Jeong Min-jae	2
(Alberta) Abby Marks	3	(Alberta) Kayla Skrlik	5
(Alberta) Jessie Hunkin	6
(Alberta) Jessie Hunkin	5
(Switzerland) Team Jäggi	8
(Manitoba) Kristy Watling	4
(Alberta) Jessica Wytrychowski	1	(Switzerland) Team Jäggi	7
(Switzerland) Team Jäggi	8	(Switzerland) Team Jäggi	8	Qualifier 3
(Manitoba) Beth Peterson	3
(Switzerland) Team Jäggi	7
(Alberta) Selena Sturmay	6

Second Knockout	To Qualifier 3
(Saskatchewan) Amber Holland	7
(Alberta) Kaitlyn Bowman	4	(Japan) Momoha Tabata	1
(Japan) Momoha Tabata	7	(Saskatchewan) Amber Holland	4
(Alberta) Selena Sturmay	5
(Alberta) Selena Sturmay	8
(South Korea) Kim Min-seo	5	(Saskatchewan) Michelle Englot	4
(Saskatchewan) Michelle Englot	10	(Alberta) Selena Sturmay	8
(Northwest Territories) Kerry Galusha	2

Second Knockout	To Qualifier 4
(South Korea) Ha Seung-youn	6
(Alberta) Morgan Muise	8	(Alberta) Morgan Muise	3
(Japan) Asuka Kanai	5	(South Korea) Ha Seung-youn	5
(United States) Tabitha Peterson	3
(South Korea) Ha Seung-youn	4
(Manitoba) Kate Cameron	6
(Manitoba) Kate Cameron	9
(Alberta) Jodi Vaughan	8	(Alberta) Jodi Vaughan	3
(Saskatchewan) Nancy Martin	3	(Manitoba) Kate Cameron	6	Qualifier 4
(British Columbia) Taylor Reese-Hansen	2
(Manitoba) Kate Cameron	0
(British Columbia) Corryn Brown	7

Second Knockout	To Qualifier 4
(Alberta) Serena Gray-Withers	6
(South Korea) Park You-been	7	(Saskatchewan) Skylar Ackerman	7
(Saskatchewan) Skylar Ackerman	8	(Saskatchewan) Skylar Ackerman	10
(Japan) Miori Nakamura	4
(Germany) Emira Abbes	2
(Manitoba) Rhonda Varnes	4	(Japan) Miori Nakamura	8
(Japan) Miori Nakamura	5	(Saskatchewan) Skylar Ackerman	6
(British Columbia) Corryn Brown	9

=== C Event ===
Third Knockout	Qualifier 5
(United States) Tabitha Peterson	8
(Alberta) Abby Marks	6	(Alberta) Abby Marks	5
(Alberta) Jessica Wytrychowski	1	(United States) Tabitha Peterson	9
(South Korea) Kim Min-seo	2
(British Columbia) Taylor Reese-Hansen	4
(Alberta) Kaitlyn Bowman	2	(South Korea) Kim Min-seo	7
(South Korea) Kim Min-seo	7	(United States) Tabitha Peterson	7
(Alberta) Selena Sturmay	6

Third Knockout	Qualifier 6
(South Korea) Jeong Min-jae	5
(Manitoba) Kristy Watling	7
(Manitoba) Kristy Watling	7
(Saskatchewan) Skylar Ackerman	4
(Manitoba) Kristy Watling	6
(Japan) Miori Nakamura	9
(Japan) Miori Nakamura	5
(Japan) Momoha Tabata	3	(Saskatchewan) Michelle Englot	4
(Saskatchewan) Michelle Englot	7	(Japan) Miori Nakamura	6
(South Korea) Ha Seung-youn	3

Third Knockout	Qualifier 7
(Saskatchewan) Amber Holland	6
(Alberta) Serena Gray-Withers	1	(Germany) Emira Abbes	4
(Germany) Emira Abbes	7	(Saskatchewan) Amber Holland	4
(Alberta) Jessie Hunkin	6
(Alberta) Jessie Hunkin	7
(Northwest Territories) Kerry Galusha	4
(Alberta) Morgan Muise	7
(Alberta) Jodi Vaughan	6
(Alberta) Morgan Muise	4
(Northwest Territories) Kerry Galusha	7

Third Knockout	Qualifier 8
(Alberta) Kayla Skrlik	4
(Japan) Asuka Kanai	5	(Japan) Asuka Kanai	2
(Saskatchewan) Nancy Martin	0	(Alberta) Kayla Skrlik	0
(Manitoba) Beth Peterson	7
(Manitoba) Beth Peterson	5
(South Korea) Park You-been	6	(South Korea) Park You-been	2
(Manitoba) Rhonda Varnes	4	(Manitoba) Beth Peterson	7
(Manitoba) Kate Cameron	4

== Knockout Results ==
All draw times listed in Mountain Daylight Time (UTC-06:00).

=== Draw 1 ===
Friday, October 6, 9:30 am

Sheet 1	1	2	3	4	5	6	7	8	Final
(South Korea) Ha Seung-youn 🔨	0	2	0	0	0	3	1	X	6
(South Korea) Kim Min-seo	1	0	0	0	1	0	0	X	2

Sheet 2	1	2	3	4	5	6	7	8	Final
(Manitoba) Beth Peterson	0	2	0	0	2	1	0	1	6
(Japan) Momoha Tabata 🔨	1	0	0	1	0	0	1	0	3

Sheet 3	1	2	3	4	5	6	7	8	9	Final
(Manitoba) Kate Cameron	0	2	0	2	0	0	0	1	1	6
(Alberta) Kaitlyn Bowman 🔨	1	0	1	0	1	1	1	0	0	5

Sheet 4	1	2	3	4	5	6	7	8	Final
(Switzerland) Team Jäggi 🔨	1	0	0	1	0	0	1	X	3
(British Columbia) Taylor Reese-Hansen	0	2	1	0	2	1	0	X	6

Sheet 5	1	2	3	4	5	6	7	8	Final
(Northwest Territories) Kerry Galusha	0	2	1	2	0	1	0	X	6
(Saskatchewan) Michelle Englot 🔨	0	0	0	0	1	0	2	X	3

Sheet 6	1	2	3	4	5	6	7	8	Final
(Alberta) Serena Gray-Withers 🔨	1	1	3	0	2	1	X	X	8
(Alberta) Jessica Wytrychowski	0	0	0	3	0	0	X	X	3

Sheet 7	1	2	3	4	5	6	7	8	Final
(Japan) Satsuki Fujisawa	0	0	1	0	1	1	2	X	5
(South Korea) Jeong Min-jae 🔨	1	0	0	0	0	0	0	X	1

Sheet 8	1	2	3	4	5	6	7	8	Final
(Alberta) Abby Marks	0	0	1	0	0	2	0	X	3
(Germany) Emira Abbes 🔨	1	1	0	2	2	0	1	X	7

=== Draw 2 ===
Friday, October 6, 1:15 pm

Sheet 1	1	2	3	4	5	6	7	8	Final
(British Columbia) Corryn Brown	0	0	2	0	1	1	0	2	6
(Japan) Miori Nakamura 🔨	0	1	0	1	0	0	2	0	4

Sheet 2	1	2	3	4	5	6	7	8	Final
(Alberta) Kayla Skrlik 🔨	2	0	2	0	2	3	X	X	9
(Manitoba) Rhonda Varnes	0	1	0	2	0	0	X	X	3

Sheet 3	1	2	3	4	5	6	7	8	Final
(Saskatchewan) Skylar Ackerman	1	0	0	1	0	0	0	X	2
(Manitoba) Kristy Watling 🔨	0	2	1	0	2	1	2	X	8

Sheet 4	1	2	3	4	5	6	7	8	Final
(United States) Tabitha Peterson 🔨	3	1	0	2	0	3	X	X	9
(South Korea) Park You-been	0	0	1	0	1	0	X	X	2

Sheet 5	1	2	3	4	5	6	7	8	Final
(Saskatchewan) Nancy Martin 🔨	0	0	1	0	1	0	X	X	2
(Saskatchewan) Amber Holland	2	3	0	1	0	1	X	X	7

Sheet 6	1	2	3	4	5	6	7	8	Final
(Alberta) Jessie Hunkin	0	2	2	0	0	5	X	X	9
(Alberta) Jodi Vaughan 🔨	1	0	0	2	0	0	X	X	3

Sheet 7	1	2	3	4	5	6	7	8	Final
(South Korea) Gim Eun-ji 🔨	2	0	0	1	4	0	X	X	7
(Alberta) Morgan Muise	0	0	0	0	0	1	X	X	1

Sheet 8	1	2	3	4	5	6	7	8	9	Final
(Alberta) Selena Sturmay 🔨	0	2	0	1	0	0	1	0	1	5
(Japan) Asuka Kanai	0	0	1	0	0	1	0	2	0	4

=== Draw 3 ===
Friday, October 6, 5:15 pm

Sheet 1	1	2	3	4	5	6	7	8	Final
(Alberta) Jessica Wytrychowski 🔨	0	0	0	1	0	X	X	X	1
(Switzerland) Team Jäggi	1	2	1	0	4	X	X	X	8

Sheet 2	1	2	3	4	5	6	7	8	Final
(South Korea) Kim Min-seo 🔨	0	2	0	3	0	0	0	X	5
(Saskatchewan) Michelle Englot	3	0	2	0	3	1	1	X	10

Sheet 3	1	2	3	4	5	6	7	8	Final
(South Korea) Jeong Min-jae 🔨	0	0	2	0	2	1	0	X	5
(Alberta) Abby Marks	0	0	0	2	0	0	1	X	3

Sheet 4	1	2	3	4	5	6	7	8	Final
(South Korea) Ha Seung-youn	0	0	0	3	1	0	2	0	6
(Northwest Territories) Kerry Galusha 🔨	3	1	2	0	0	1	0	2	9

Sheet 5	1	2	3	4	5	6	7	8	Final
(Manitoba) Kate Cameron 🔨	2	0	0	0	0	0	X	X	2
(Manitoba) Beth Peterson	0	2	1	1	2	1	X	X	7

Sheet 6	1	2	3	4	5	6	7	8	Final
(Japan) Satsuki Fujisawa 🔨	1	1	4	1	1	X	X	X	8
(Germany) Emira Abbes	0	0	0	0	0	X	X	X	0

Sheet 7	1	2	3	4	5	6	7	8	9	Final
(Alberta) Serena Gray-Withers	2	0	1	1	1	0	0	1	0	6
(British Columbia) Taylor Reese-Hansen 🔨	0	1	0	0	0	2	3	0	3	9

Sheet 8	1	2	3	4	5	6	7	8	Final
(Alberta) Kaitlyn Bowman 🔨	0	1	1	0	1	1	0	0	4
(Japan) Momoha Tabata	2	0	0	1	0	0	2	2	7

=== Draw 4 ===
Friday, October 6, 9:00 pm

Sheet 1	1	2	3	4	5	6	7	8	Final
(Alberta) Jessie Hunkin 🔨	2	0	0	0	2	0	1	X	5
(Saskatchewan) Amber Holland	0	1	0	0	0	2	0	X	3

Sheet 2	1	2	3	4	5	6	7	8	Final
(United States) Tabitha Peterson	0	0	0	3	0	1	0	2	6
(Manitoba) Kristy Watling 🔨	1	1	0	0	2	0	1	0	5

Sheet 3	1	2	3	4	5	6	7	8	Final
(South Korea) Gim Eun-ji 🔨	0	0	2	1	0	1	1	2	7
(Alberta) Selena Sturmay	0	3	0	0	2	0	0	0	5

Sheet 4	1	2	3	4	5	6	7	8	Final
(Alberta) Kayla Skrlik	0	0	2	0	2	0	0	X	4
(British Columbia) Corryn Brown 🔨	1	2	0	1	0	4	1	X	9

Sheet 5	1	2	3	4	5	6	7	8	9	Final
(Manitoba) Rhonda Varnes 🔨	1	1	0	0	0	0	1	1	0	4
(Japan) Miori Nakamura	0	0	1	1	1	1	0	0	1	5

Sheet 6	1	2	3	4	5	6	7	8	Final
(Alberta) Morgan Muise	0	3	0	2	1	0	2	X	8
(Japan) Asuka Kanai 🔨	1	0	3	0	0	1	0	X	5

Sheet 7	1	2	3	4	5	6	7	8	Final
(Alberta) Jodi Vaughan	1	2	0	2	1	0	2	X	8
(Saskatchewan) Nancy Martin 🔨	0	0	1	0	0	2	0	X	3

Sheet 8	1	2	3	4	5	6	7	8	Final
(South Korea) Park You-been 🔨	0	1	0	2	0	4	0	0	7
(Saskatchewan) Skylar Ackerman	0	0	2	0	1	0	4	1	8

=== Draw 5 ===
Saturday, October 7, 9:00 am

Sheet 2	1	2	3	4	5	6	7	8	Final
(Japan) Satsuki Fujisawa 🔨	0	2	0	0	1	1	0	1	5
(British Columbia) Taylor Reese-Hansen	0	0	0	1	0	0	1	0	2

Sheet 3	1	2	3	4	5	6	7	8	Final
(Manitoba) Beth Peterson	0	0	0	1	0	0	X	X	1
(Northwest Territories) Kerry Galusha 🔨	1	2	2	0	1	1	X	X	7

Sheet 4	1	2	3	4	5	6	7	8	Final
(Saskatchewan) Amber Holland 🔨	1	1	2	0	3	X	X	X	7
(Japan) Momoha Tabata	0	0	0	1	0	X	X	X	1

Sheet 5	1	2	3	4	5	6	7	8	Final
(Manitoba) Kristy Watling	0	1	0	1	1	0	1	0	4
(Switzerland) Team Jäggi 🔨	2	0	2	0	0	1	0	2	7

Sheet 6	1	2	3	4	5	6	7	8	Final
(Alberta) Kayla Skrlik 🔨	2	1	0	0	4	2	X	X	9
(South Korea) Jeong Min-jae	0	0	0	2	0	0	X	X	2

Sheet 7	1	2	3	4	5	6	7	8	Final
(Alberta) Selena Sturmay	0	3	1	0	0	3	1	X	8
(Saskatchewan) Michelle Englot 🔨	2	0	0	0	2	0	0	X	4

=== Draw 6 ===
Saturday, October 7, 12:45 pm

Sheet 1	1	2	3	4	5	6	7	8	Final
(Manitoba) Kate Cameron	0	2	0	1	4	0	2	X	9
(Alberta) Jodi Vaughan 🔨	1	0	1	0	0	1	0	X	3

Sheet 3	1	2	3	4	5	6	7	8	Final
(Germany) Emira Abbes	0	0	2	0	0	0	X	X	2
(Japan) Miori Nakamura 🔨	1	2	0	2	1	2	X	X	8

Sheet 4	1	2	3	4	5	6	7	8	Final
(South Korea) Gim Eun-ji	0	1	0	2	2	1	0	1	7
(Alberta) Jessie Hunkin 🔨	2	0	1	0	0	0	1	0	4

Sheet 5	1	2	3	4	5	6	7	8	9	Final
(Alberta) Serena Gray-Withers	0	0	0	3	2	0	1	0	0	6
(Saskatchewan) Skylar Ackerman 🔨	2	1	1	0	0	1	0	1	1	7

Sheet 7	1	2	3	4	5	6	7	8	Final
(United States) Tabitha Peterson 🔨	0	0	0	1	0	X	X	X	1
(British Columbia) Corryn Brown	1	1	3	0	2	X	X	X	7

Sheet 8	1	2	3	4	5	6	7	8	Final
(South Korea) Ha Seung-youn 🔨	1	0	0	2	0	1	0	2	6
(Alberta) Morgan Muise	0	1	0	0	1	0	1	0	3

=== Draw 7 ===
Saturday, October 7, 4:30 pm

Sheet 1	1	2	3	4	5	6	7	8	Final
(Japan) Momoha Tabata	0	1	1	0	1	0	0	X	3
(Saskatchewan) Michelle Englot 🔨	1	0	0	3	0	2	1	X	7

Sheet 2	1	2	3	4	5	6	7	8	Final
(Alberta) Serena Gray-Withers 🔨	0	1	0	0	0	0	X	X	1
(Germany) Emira Abbes	0	0	0	1	3	3	X	X	7

Sheet 3	1	2	3	4	5	6	7	8	Final
(Saskatchewan) Amber Holland	0	1	0	0	1	0	2	0	4
(Alberta) Selena Sturmay 🔨	1	0	0	1	0	1	0	2	5

Sheet 4	1	2	3	4	5	6	7	8	Final
(Japan) Satsuki Fujisawa 🔨	1	1	0	0	2	2	2	X	8
(Northwest Territories) Kerry Galusha	0	0	1	0	0	0	0	X	1

Sheet 5	1	2	3	4	5	6	7	8	Final
(Alberta) Kayla Skrlik 🔨	0	3	0	0	0	1	1	0	5
(Alberta) Jessie Hunkin	0	0	1	1	2	0	0	2	6

Sheet 7	1	2	3	4	5	6	7	8	Final
(South Korea) Park You-been 🔨	0	1	1	0	0	1	0	3	6
(Manitoba) Rhonda Varnes	0	0	0	2	0	0	2	0	4

Sheet 8	1	2	3	4	5	6	7	8	Final
(Switzerland) Team Jäggi	0	2	0	2	1	3	X	X	8
(Manitoba) Beth Peterson 🔨	1	0	2	0	0	0	X	X	3

=== Draw 8 ===
Saturday, October 7, 8:15 pm

Sheet 1	1	2	3	4	5	6	7	8	Final
(Saskatchewan) Skylar Ackerman 🔨	2	0	1	3	1	0	3	X	10
(Japan) Miori Nakamura	0	3	0	0	0	1	0	X	4

Sheet 2	1	2	3	4	5	6	7	8	Final
(Alberta) Abby Marks 🔨	0	2	1	1	1	0	1	X	6
(Alberta) Jessica Wytrychowski	0	0	0	0	0	1	0	X	1

Sheet 3	1	2	3	4	5	6	7	8	Final
(Japan) Asuka Kanai	0	0	3	0	1	1	X	X	5
(Saskatchewan) Nancy Martin 🔨	0	0	0	0	0	0	X	X	0

Sheet 4	1	2	3	4	5	6	7	8	Final
(Alberta) Kaitlyn Bowman	1	0	0	0	0	0	1	X	2
(South Korea) Kim Min-seo 🔨	0	2	0	0	3	2	0	X	7

Sheet 5	1	2	3	4	5	6	7	8	Final
(South Korea) Ha Seung-youn	0	0	1	0	0	0	3	1	5
(United States) Tabitha Peterson 🔨	2	0	0	0	0	1	0	0	3

Sheet 6	1	2	3	4	5	6	7	8	Final
(South Korea) Gim Eun-ji	0	1	0	2	2	0	2	X	7
(British Columbia) Corryn Brown 🔨	2	0	2	0	0	1	0	X	5

Sheet 8	1	2	3	4	5	6	7	8	Final
(Manitoba) Kate Cameron 🔨	3	0	0	2	0	1	X	X	6
(British Columbia) Taylor Reese-Hansen	0	1	0	0	1	0	X	X	2

=== Draw 9 ===
Sunday, October 8, 9:00 am

Sheet 1	1	2	3	4	5	6	7	8	Final
(Alberta) Selena Sturmay 🔨	1	0	2	1	0	4	X	X	8
(Northwest Territories) Kerry Galusha	0	1	0	0	1	0	X	X	2

Sheet 3	1	2	3	4	5	6	7	8	Final
(Alberta) Jessie Hunkin	1	0	3	0	1	0	0	X	5
(Switzerland) Team Jäggi 🔨	0	2	0	1	0	2	3	X	8

Sheet 4	1	2	3	4	5	6	7	8	Final
(Japan) Miori Nakamura 🔨	0	0	0	2	2	1	0	0	5
(Saskatchewan) Michelle Englot	1	0	0	0	0	0	2	1	4

Sheet 5	1	2	3	4	5	6	7	8	Final
(Alberta) Morgan Muise	1	2	0	0	0	3	0	1	7
(Alberta) Jodi Vaughan 🔨	0	0	1	2	1	0	2	0	6

Sheet 6	1	2	3	4	5	6	7	8	Final
(Manitoba) Beth Peterson 🔨	0	2	1	0	0	0	2	X	5
(South Korea) Park You-been	0	0	0	0	1	1	0	X	2

Sheet 7	1	2	3	4	5	6	7	8	Final
(Saskatchewan) Amber Holland	1	0	0	1	1	1	0	2	6
(Germany) Emira Abbes 🔨	0	0	2	0	0	0	2	0	4

Sheet 8	1	2	3	4	5	6	7	8	Final
(South Korea) Jeong Min-jae 🔨	0	0	0	2	1	0	2	0	5
(Manitoba) Kristy Watling	0	1	1	0	0	2	0	3	7

=== Draw 10 ===
Sunday, October 8, 12:45 pm

Sheet 2	1	2	3	4	5	6	7	8	Final
(South Korea) Ha Seung-youn	2	0	0	0	2	0	0	0	4
(Manitoba) Kate Cameron 🔨	0	1	2	1	0	0	0	2	6

Sheet 3	1	2	3	4	5	6	7	8	Final
(Saskatchewan) Skylar Ackerman 🔨	1	0	2	0	3	0	0	0	6
(British Columbia) Corryn Brown	0	3	0	2	0	1	1	2	9

Sheet 4	1	2	3	4	5	6	7	8	Final
(United States) Tabitha Peterson 🔨	2	0	4	0	1	0	1	X	8
(Alberta) Abby Marks	0	0	0	1	0	4	0	X	5

Sheet 5	1	2	3	4	5	6	7	8	9	Final
(Switzerland) Team Jäggi 🔨	2	0	0	0	1	0	2	1	1	7
(Alberta) Selena Sturmay	0	3	1	1	0	1	0	0	0	6

Sheet 6	1	2	3	4	5	6	7	8	Final
(British Columbia) Taylor Reese-Hansen 🔨	1	0	0	0	1	0	2	0	4
(South Korea) Kim Min-seo	0	2	0	2	0	1	0	2	7

Sheet 7	1	2	3	4	5	6	7	8	Final
(Alberta) Kayla Skrlik	1	1	0	1	0	1	0	X	4
(Japan) Asuka Kanai 🔨	0	0	0	0	1	0	1	X	2

=== Draw 11 ===
Sunday, October 8, 4:30 pm

Sheet 2	1	2	3	4	5	6	7	8	Final
(Saskatchewan) Amber Holland 🔨	2	0	1	1	0	0	0	0	4
(Alberta) Jessie Hunkin	0	1	0	0	2	1	1	1	6

Sheet 3	1	2	3	4	5	6	7	8	Final
(Japan) Miori Nakamura 🔨	0	1	0	0	2	0	3	X	6
(South Korea) Ha Seung-youn	0	0	1	1	0	1	0	X	3

Sheet 4	1	2	3	4	5	6	7	8	Final
(Manitoba) Kate Cameron	0	0	0	0	0	X	X	X	0
(British Columbia) Corryn Brown 🔨	1	0	2	3	1	X	X	X	7

Sheet 5	1	2	3	4	5	6	7	8	Final
(United States) Tabitha Peterson 🔨	1	0	4	2	1	1	X	X	9
(South Korea) Kim Min-seo	0	2	0	0	0	0	X	X	2

Sheet 6	1	2	3	4	5	6	7	8	Final
(Alberta) Morgan Muise	0	1	0	1	0	2	0	X	4
(Northwest Territories) Kerry Galusha 🔨	0	0	2	0	2	0	3	X	7

Sheet 7	1	2	3	4	5	6	7	8	Final
(Manitoba) Kristy Watling	0	0	0	2	1	0	2	2	7
(Saskatchewan) Skylar Ackerman 🔨	0	1	1	0	0	2	0	0	4

Sheet 8	1	2	3	4	5	6	7	8	Final
(Alberta) Kayla Skrlik	0	0	0	0	X	X	X	X	0
(Manitoba) Beth Peterson 🔨	1	2	1	3	X	X	X	X	7

=== Draw 12 ===
Sunday, October 8, 8:15 pm

Sheet 3	1	2	3	4	5	6	7	8	Final
(United States) Tabitha Peterson	1	0	3	0	0	2	0	1	7
(Alberta) Selena Sturmay 🔨	0	1	0	2	2	0	1	0	6

Sheet 4	1	2	3	4	5	6	7	8	Final
(Alberta) Jessie Hunkin	0	0	2	0	2	0	2	1	7
(Northwest Territories) Kerry Galusha 🔨	0	1	0	1	0	2	0	0	4

Sheet 5	1	2	3	4	5	6	7	8	Final
(Manitoba) Beth Peterson 🔨	1	0	0	3	0	0	3	X	7
(Manitoba) Kate Cameron	0	0	2	0	0	2	0	X	4

Sheet 6	1	2	3	4	5	6	7	8	Final
(Manitoba) Kristy Watling 🔨	2	0	0	0	3	0	1	0	6
(Japan) Miori Nakamura	0	2	2	0	0	3	0	2	9

== Skins game ==
As tradition at the Autumn Gold, a skins game was played between the two A qualifiers, Satsuki Fujisawa and Gim Eun-ji. The game was played during draw 10 of the event.

Sunday, October 8, 12:45 pm

Values (CAD)	$100	$100	$150	$150	$200	$300	-	-		$1,000
Sheet 1	1	2	3	4	5	6	7	8	Button	Total
(Japan) Satsuki Fujisawa		$				X	-	-		$200
(South Korea) Gim Eun-ji 🔨	X		$	$	$		-	-	$	$800

== Playoffs ==
Quarterfinals
A1	(Japan) Satsuki Fujisawa	5
C2	(Japan) Miori Nakamura	6
B2	(British Columbia) Corryn Brown	8
C1	(United States) Tabitha Peterson	7
A2	(South Korea) Gim Eun-ji	8
C3	(Alberta) Jessie Hunkin	5
B1	(Switzerland) Team Jäggi	6
C4	(Manitoba) Beth Peterson	7

Semifinals
C2	(Japan) Miori Nakamura	6
B2	(British Columbia) Corryn Brown	5
A2	(South Korea) Gim Eun-ji	7
C4	(Manitoba) Beth Peterson	4

Final
C2	(Japan) Miori Nakamura	3
A2	(South Korea) Gim Eun-ji	8

=== Quarterfinals ===
Monday, October 9, 9:00 am

Sheet 3	1	2	3	4	5	6	7	8	9	Final
(Japan) Satsuki Fujisawa 🔨	0	1	0	2	0	1	0	1	0	5
(Japan) Miori Nakamura	0	0	1	0	2	0	2	0	1	6

Sheet 4	1	2	3	4	5	6	7	8	Final
(Switzerland) Team Jäggi 🔨	0	0	2	0	1	0	2	1	6
(Manitoba) Beth Peterson	1	2	0	2	0	2	0	0	7

Sheet 5	1	2	3	4	5	6	7	8	Final
(South Korea) Gim Eun-ji 🔨	2	0	1	0	1	0	0	4	8
(Alberta) Jessie Hunkin	0	1	0	1	0	0	3	0	5

Sheet 6	1	2	3	4	5	6	7	8	Final
(British Columbia) Corryn Brown 🔨	1	0	3	0	3	0	1	0	8
(United States) Tabitha Peterson	0	3	0	1	0	2	0	1	7

=== Semifinals ===
Monday, October 9, 12:15 pm

Sheet 5	1	2	3	4	5	6	7	8	Final
(Japan) Miori Nakamura	0	0	2	3	0	0	1	0	6
(British Columbia) Corryn Brown 🔨	0	2	0	0	1	1	0	1	5

Sheet 6	1	2	3	4	5	6	7	8	Final
(South Korea) Gim Eun-ji 🔨	2	2	1	0	0	0	2	X	7
(Manitoba) Beth Peterson	0	0	0	1	1	2	0	X	4

=== Final ===
Monday, October 9, 3:30 pm

Sheet 5	1	2	3	4	5	6	7	8	Final
(Japan) Miori Nakamura	0	0	1	0	2	0	X	X	3
(South Korea) Gim Eun-ji 🔨	2	0	0	3	0	3	X	X	8
