= 2026 BC Women's Curling Championship =

Canadian provincial women's curling championship

2026 BC Women's Curling Championship presented by Best Western
- Host city: Esquimalt, British Columbia
- Arena: Archie Browning Sports Centre
- Dates: December 30, 2025 – January 4, 2026
- Winner: Team Reese-Hansen
- Curling club: Victoria CC, Victoria
- Skip: Taylor Reese-Hansen
- Third: Megan McGillivray
- Second: Kim Bonneau
- Lead: Julianna MacKenzie
- Coach: Todd Troyer
- Finalist: Corryn Brown

The 2026 BC Women's Curling Championship presented by Best Western, the provincial women's curling championship for British Columbia, was held from December 30, 2025, to January 4, 2026, at Archie Browning Sports Centre in Esquimalt, British Columbia. The winning Taylor Reese-Hansen rink represented British Columbia at the 2026 Scotties Tournament of Hearts in Mississauga, Ontario. The event was held in conjunction with the 2026 BC Men's Curling Championship, the provincial men's championship.

== Qualification process ==
The qualification process is as follows:

Qualification method	Berths	Qualifying team(s)
2025 Provincial champion	1	Corryn Brown
CTRS Leaders	5	Taylor Reese-Hansen; Kayla MacMillan; Kelsey Powell; Mahra Harris; Kayla Wilson
Open Qualifier	2	Holly Hafeli; Sarah Wark

== Teams ==
The teams are listed as follows:

Skip	Third	Second	Lead	Alternate	Coach	Club(s)
Corryn Brown	Erin Pincott	Sarah Koltun	Samantha Fisher		Jim Cotter	Kamloops CC, Kamloops
Holly Hafeli	Gabby Brissette	Ashley Mallett	Natalie Hafeli	Ella Casparis		Victoria CC, Victoria; Langley CC, Langley; Kelowna CC, Kelowna; Kamloops CC, Kamloops
Mahra Harris	Meredith Cole	Sasha Wilson	Elizabeth Bowles			Victoria CC, Victoria
Kayla MacMillan	Brittany Tran	Lindsay Dubue	Lauren Lenentine		Niklas Edin	Victoria CC, Victoria
Kelsey Powell	Falon Chretien	Alyssa Kyllo	Jaelyn Cotter		Doug Dalziel	Vernon CC, Vernon
Taylor Reese-Hansen	Megan McGillivray	Kim Bonneau	Julianna MacKenzie		Todd Troyer	Victoria CC, Victoria
Sarah Wark	Stephanie Jackson-Baier	Jade Merkley	Emma Les			Victoria CC, Victoria; Kelowna CC, Kelowna; Abbotsford CC, Abbotsford; Chilliwack CC, Chilliwack
Kayla Wilson	Jorja Kopytko	Sarah Wong	Amanda Wong		Jeff Richards	Victoria CC, Victoria; Vancouver CC, Vancouver; Kamloops CC, Kamloops

== Round robin standings ==
Final Round Robin Standings

Key
Teams to Playoffs

Skip	W	L	W–L	PF	PA	EW	EL	BE	SE	LSD
Corryn Brown	6	1	1–1	54	29	33	21	3	11	372.9
Kayla MacMillan	6	1	1–1	59	23	32	21	2	12	519.6
Taylor Reese-Hansen	6	1	1–1	61	39	32	26	0	8	521.7
Mahra Harris	4	3	–	48	44	27	28	2	6	406.9
Kelsey Powell	2	5	1–0	31	52	24	27	6	3	518.4
Kayla Wilson	2	5	0–1	37	65	20	33	2	3	663.6
Holly Hafeli	1	6	1–0	39	58	27	33	4	4	639.8
Sarah Wark	1	6	0–1	40	59	26	32	2	7	874.8

== Round robin results ==
All draw times listed in Pacific Time (UTC−08:00).

=== Draw 1 ===
Tuesday, December 30, 9:00 am

Sheet A	1	2	3	4	5	6	7	8	9	10	Final
Kelsey Powell 🔨	0	1	0	0	2	0	1	1	0	0	5
Sarah Wark	0	0	0	2	0	3	0	0	1	2	8

Sheet C	1	2	3	4	5	6	7	8	9	10	Final
Taylor Reese-Hansen 🔨	0	1	0	1	0	3	0	2	1	X	8
Mahra Harris	1	0	2	0	1	0	1	0	0	X	5

=== Draw 2 ===
Tuesday, December 30, 2:00 pm

Sheet D	1	2	3	4	5	6	7	8	9	10	Final
Kayla MacMillan	1	2	1	0	1	0	2	0	1	X	8
Holly Hafeli 🔨	0	0	0	1	0	1	0	1	0	X	3

Sheet E	1	2	3	4	5	6	7	8	9	10	Final
Corryn Brown 🔨	1	4	0	1	4	1	X	X	X	X	11
Kayla Wilson	0	0	1	0	0	0	X	X	X	X	1

=== Draw 3 ===
Tuesday, December 30, 7:00 pm

Sheet B	1	2	3	4	5	6	7	8	9	10	Final
Mahra Harris	0	1	0	0	0	0	0	0	X	X	1
Corryn Brown 🔨	1	0	1	1	0	2	1	3	X	X	9

Sheet C	1	2	3	4	5	6	7	8	9	10	Final
Holly Hafeli	0	0	0	1	1	0	1	0	1	X	4
Kelsey Powell 🔨	1	0	0	0	0	3	0	1	0	X	5

Sheet D	1	2	3	4	5	6	7	8	9	10	Final
Kayla Wilson	0	0	1	0	4	0	1	0	2	0	8
Taylor Reese-Hansen 🔨	2	1	0	2	0	2	0	3	0	1	11

=== Draw 4 ===
Wednesday, December 31, 9:00 am

Sheet C	1	2	3	4	5	6	7	8	9	10	Final
Kayla MacMillan 🔨	0	0	2	2	0	0	2	1	0	X	7
Sarah Wark	0	0	0	0	2	1	0	0	1	X	4

=== Draw 5 ===
Wednesday, December 31, 2:00 pm

Sheet A	1	2	3	4	5	6	7	8	9	10	Final
Mahra Harris	0	1	0	1	0	1	0	0	0	X	3
Kayla MacMillan 🔨	2	0	1	0	2	0	1	1	4	X	11

Sheet B	1	2	3	4	5	6	7	8	9	10	Final
Taylor Reese-Hansen 🔨	2	0	2	0	0	0	0	3	3	X	10
Sarah Wark	0	1	0	1	2	1	1	0	0	X	6

Sheet D	1	2	3	4	5	6	7	8	9	10	Final
Corryn Brown	0	2	0	2	0	2	0	1	0	1	8
Kelsey Powell 🔨	1	0	1	0	1	0	1	0	2	0	6

=== Draw 6 ===
Wednesday, December 31, 7:00 pm

Sheet A	1	2	3	4	5	6	7	8	9	10	Final
Holly Hafeli	0	0	0	0	0	2	0	1	2	0	5
Corryn Brown 🔨	0	0	2	1	2	0	1	0	0	1	7

Sheet B	1	2	3	4	5	6	7	8	9	10	Final
Kayla Wilson	0	0	0	0	0	2	0	1	0	X	3
Kelsey Powell 🔨	2	0	1	1	0	0	2	0	0	X	6

=== Draw 7 ===
Thursday, January 1, 9:00 am

Sheet A	1	2	3	4	5	6	7	8	9	10	Final
Taylor Reese-Hansen	0	2	0	1	0	1	0	3	2	X	9
Kelsey Powell 🔨	0	0	1	0	2	0	1	0	0	X	4

Sheet B	1	2	3	4	5	6	7	8	9	10	Final
Sarah Wark	2	0	0	2	0	2	0	0	1	0	7
Holly Hafeli 🔨	0	1	1	0	1	0	3	2	0	1	9

Sheet C	1	2	3	4	5	6	7	8	9	10	Final
Mahra Harris 🔨	1	4	2	0	4	2	X	X	X	X	13
Kayla Wilson	0	0	0	1	0	0	X	X	X	X	1

Sheet E	1	2	3	4	5	6	7	8	9	10	Final
Kayla MacMillan	0	1	0	2	0	1	0	0	1	0	5
Corryn Brown 🔨	0	0	1	0	2	0	1	1	0	1	6

=== Draw 9 ===
Thursday, January 1, 7:00 pm

Sheet B	1	2	3	4	5	6	7	8	9	10	Final
Kayla MacMillan 🔨	2	0	2	0	3	1	1	X	X	X	9
Kayla Wilson	0	1	0	1	0	0	0	X	X	X	2

Sheet C	1	2	3	4	5	6	7	8	9	10	Final
Sarah Wark	0	1	0	1	0	0	X	X	X	X	2
Corryn Brown 🔨	2	0	2	0	3	2	X	X	X	X	9

Sheet D	1	2	3	4	5	6	7	8	9	10	Final
Holly Hafeli 🔨	1	0	0	0	1	0	1	0	X	X	3
Taylor Reese-Hansen	0	4	1	1	0	1	0	5	X	X	12

Sheet E	1	2	3	4	5	6	7	8	9	10	Final
Kelsey Powell	0	0	1	0	0	1	0	X	X	X	2
Mahra Harris 🔨	2	0	0	3	3	0	2	X	X	X	10

=== Draw 10 ===
Friday, January 2, 9:00 am

Sheet A	1	2	3	4	5	6	7	8	9	10	Final
Sarah Wark	0	1	2	0	0	2	0	0	1	X	6
Kayla Wilson 🔨	1	0	0	3	1	0	2	3	0	X	10

Sheet B	1	2	3	4	5	6	7	8	9	10	11	Final
Holly Hafeli	0	0	1	0	0	1	0	1	0	3	0	6
Mahra Harris 🔨	1	0	0	0	2	0	1	0	2	0	1	7

Sheet E	1	2	3	4	5	6	7	8	9	10	Final
Taylor Reese-Hansen	0	0	1	0	0	1	X	X	X	X	2
Kayla MacMillan 🔨	2	2	0	3	2	0	X	X	X	X	9

=== Draw 11 ===
Friday, January 2, 2:00 pm

Sheet C	1	2	3	4	5	6	7	8	9	10	Final
Kayla Wilson	0	2	0	4	0	1	0	3	0	2	12
Holly Hafeli 🔨	1	0	0	0	3	0	3	0	2	0	9

Sheet D	1	2	3	4	5	6	7	8	9	10	Final
Mahra Harris	1	0	4	0	1	0	1	0	0	2	9
Sarah Wark 🔨	0	2	0	1	0	2	0	0	2	0	7

=== Draw 12 ===
Friday, January 2, 7:00 pm

Sheet C	1	2	3	4	5	6	7	8	9	10	Final
Corryn Brown	0	1	0	1	0	0	2	0	X	X	4
Taylor Reese-Hansen 🔨	2	0	1	0	1	2	0	3	X	X	9

Sheet D	1	2	3	4	5	6	7	8	9	10	Final
Kelsey Powell 🔨	1	0	0	1	0	0	1	0	X	X	3
Kayla MacMillan	0	4	0	0	2	0	0	4	X	X	10

== Playoffs ==
Semifinal			Final
			1	Corryn Brown	5
2	Kayla MacMillan	3	3	Taylor Reese-Hansen	9
3	Taylor Reese-Hansen	8

=== Semifinal ===
Saturday, January 3, 2:00 pm

Sheet B	1	2	3	4	5	6	7	8	9	10	Final
Kayla MacMillan	0	0	1	0	0	1	0	1	0	X	3
Taylor Reese-Hansen 🔨	2	0	0	1	2	0	2	0	1	X	8

=== Final ===
Sunday, January 4, 9:00 am

Sheet D	1	2	3	4	5	6	7	8	9	10	Final
Corryn Brown 🔨	2	0	1	0	1	0	0	1	0	X	5
Taylor Reese-Hansen	0	1	0	1	0	3	1	0	3	X	9

2026 BC Women's Curling Championship

Taylor Reese-Hansen
1st British Columbia Provincial Championship title
