= 2025 BC Women's Curling Championship =

Canadian provincial women's curling championship

2025 BC Women's Curling Championship presented by Best Western
- Host city: Langley, British Columbia
- Arena: George Preston Arena
- Dates: January 21–26
- Winner: Team Brown
- Curling club: Kamloops CC, Kamloops
- Skip: Corryn Brown
- Third: Erin Pincott
- Second: Sarah Koltun
- Lead: Samantha Fisher
- Coach: Jim Cotter
- Finalist: Kayla MacMillan

The 2025 BC Women's Curling Championship presented by Best Western, the provincial women's curling championship for British Columbia, was held from January 21 to 26 at George Preston Arena in Langley, British Columbia. The winning Corryn Brown rink represented British Columbia at the 2025 Scotties Tournament of Hearts in Thunder Bay, Ontario. The event was held in conjunction with the 2025 BC Men's Curling Championship, the provincial men's championship.

== Qualification process ==
Qualification method	Berths	Qualifying team(s)
2024 Provincial champion	1	Kayla MacMillan
BC Women's Tour	3	Stephanie Jackson-Baier; Taylor Reese-Hansen; Kristen Ryan
CTRS Leaders	2	Corryn Brown; Dailene Pewarchuk
Open Qualifier	2	Holly Hafeli; Sarah Wark

== Teams ==
The teams are listed as follows:

Skip	Third	Second	Lead	Alternate	Coach	Club(s)
Corryn Brown	Erin Pincott	Sarah Koltun	Samantha Fisher		Jim Cotter	Kamloops CC, Kamloops
Holly Hafeli	Jorja Kopytko	Gabby Brissette	Natalie Hafeli		Monica Makar	Kamloops CC, Kamloops
Stephanie Jackson-Baier	Jessie Sanderson	Ashley Sanderson	Diane Gushulak		Chris Summers	Victoria CC, Victoria; Royal City CC, New Westminster
Kayla MacMillan	Sarah Daniels	Lindsay Dubue	Sarah Loken		Niklas Edin	Victoria CC, Victoria
Dailene Pewarchuk	Kayla Wilson	Sasha Wilson	Cierra Fisher		Cindy Tucker	Victoria CC, Victoria
Taylor Reese-Hansen	Megan McGillivray	Kim Bonneau	Julianna Mackenzie		Todd Troyer	Victoria CC, Victoria
Kristen Ryan	Shannon Joanisse	Megan Yamamoto	Kirsten Fox		Diane Dezura	Golden Ears WC, Maple Ridge
Sarah Wark	Shawna Jensen	Alyssa Kyllo	Kristen Pilote	Carley Sandwith-Craig	Greg Monkman	Abbotsford CC, Abbotsford

== Round robin standings ==
Final Round Robin Standings

Key
Teams to Playoffs

Skip	W	L	W–L	PF	PA	EW	EL	BE	SE
Kayla MacMillan	6	1	1–0	55	35	34	22	2	11
Corryn Brown	6	1	0–1	59	35	32	27	5	9
Kristen Ryan	5	2	1–0	54	43	32	24	4	11
Taylor Reese-Hansen	5	2	0–1	57	39	34	26	3	10
Stephanie Jackson-Baier	2	5	1–1	41	61	24	38	0	2
Dailene Pewarchuk	2	5	1–1	42	53	29	29	2	9
Holly Hafeli	2	5	1–1	42	58	28	31	1	8
Sarah Wark	0	7	–	42	68	24	40	1	4

== Round robin results ==
All draw times listed in Pacific Time (UTC−08:00).

=== Draw 1 ===
Tuesday, January 21, 9:00 am

Sheet A	1	2	3	4	5	6	7	8	9	10	Final
Sarah Wark 🔨	0	0	1	0	0	3	0	3	0	0	7
Holly Hafeli	1	1	0	2	1	0	2	0	1	2	10

Sheet C	1	2	3	4	5	6	7	8	9	10	Final
Dailene Pewarchuk	0	0	1	0	2	0	3	1	0	0	7
Kristen Ryan 🔨	1	0	0	2	0	1	0	0	2	2	8

Sheet E	1	2	3	4	5	6	7	8	9	10	Final
Stephanie Jackson-Baier	0	0	1	0	0	2	0	X	X	X	3
Kayla MacMillan 🔨	3	1	0	1	2	0	2	X	X	X	9

=== Draw 2 ===
Tuesday, January 21, 2:00 pm

Sheet B	1	2	3	4	5	6	7	8	9	10	Final
Taylor Reese-Hansen 🔨	2	0	0	3	0	3	0	3	X	X	11
Kayla MacMillan	0	1	1	0	1	0	1	0	X	X	4

Sheet D	1	2	3	4	5	6	7	8	9	10	Final
Sarah Wark	1	0	0	1	0	2	0	1	0	0	5
Dailene Pewarchuk 🔨	0	1	1	0	1	0	3	0	2	2	10

=== Draw 3 ===
Tuesday, January 21, 7:00 pm

Sheet C	1	2	3	4	5	6	7	8	9	10	Final
Stephanie Jackson-Baier	0	0	1	2	0	1	0	0	X	X	4
Corryn Brown 🔨	0	2	0	0	1	0	2	4	X	X	9

Sheet E	1	2	3	4	5	6	7	8	9	10	Final
Kristen Ryan 🔨	3	0	3	0	5	1	X	X	X	X	12
Holly Hafeli	0	1	0	3	0	0	X	X	X	X	4

=== Draw 4 ===
Wednesday, January 22, 9:00 am

Sheet B	1	2	3	4	5	6	7	8	9	10	Final
Sarah Wark	0	1	0	2	0	3	0	0	0	2	8
Kristen Ryan 🔨	0	0	2	0	3	0	0	3	2	0	10

Sheet D	1	2	3	4	5	6	7	8	9	10	11	Final
Dailene Pewarchuk	2	0	1	0	1	2	0	1	0	1	0	8
Stephanie Jackson-Baier 🔨	0	2	0	3	0	0	2	0	1	0	1	9

=== Draw 5 ===
Wednesday, January 22, 2:00 pm

Sheet A	1	2	3	4	5	6	7	8	9	10	Final
Kristen Ryan	1	0	1	0	0	2	2	0	1	X	7
Taylor Reese-Hansen 🔨	0	1	0	2	0	0	0	1	0	X	4

Sheet C	1	2	3	4	5	6	7	8	9	10	Final
Sarah Wark	0	0	1	0	0	0	0	0	X	X	1
Kayla MacMillan 🔨	1	4	0	1	1	0	1	4	X	X	12

Sheet D	1	2	3	4	5	6	7	8	9	10	Final
Holly Hafeli 🔨	1	0	0	0	0	2	0	1	0	X	4
Corryn Brown	0	2	1	1	2	0	2	0	4	X	12

=== Draw 6 ===
Wednesday, January 22, 7:00 pm

Sheet B	1	2	3	4	5	6	7	8	9	10	Final
Corryn Brown 🔨	0	3	1	0	1	0	3	X	X	X	8
Dailene Pewarchuk	0	0	0	1	0	1	0	X	X	X	2

Sheet D	1	2	3	4	5	6	7	8	9	10	11	Final
Stephanie Jackson-Baier 🔨	0	1	0	0	0	3	0	3	0	1	0	8
Taylor Reese-Hansen	1	0	1	2	1	0	2	0	1	0	1	9

=== Draw 7 ===
Thursday, January 23, 9:00 am

Sheet B	1	2	3	4	5	6	7	8	9	10	Final
Stephanie Jackson-Baier 🔨	3	0	1	1	0	1	0	2	0	1	9
Sarah Wark	0	3	0	0	1	0	2	0	2	0	8

Sheet E	1	2	3	4	5	6	7	8	9	10	Final
Taylor Reese-Hansen 🔨	0	1	0	0	1	2	1	0	1	0	6
Corryn Brown	1	0	3	1	0	0	0	1	0	2	8

=== Draw 8 ===
Thursday, January 23, 2:00 pm

Sheet B	1	2	3	4	5	6	7	8	9	10	Final
Dailene Pewarchuk	0	2	1	0	2	1	0	2	2	X	10
Holly Hafeli 🔨	2	0	0	1	0	0	2	0	0	X	5

Sheet D	1	2	3	4	5	6	7	8	9	10	Final
Kayla MacMillan 🔨	1	0	0	2	0	2	0	1	2	X	8
Kristen Ryan	0	1	0	0	1	0	1	0	0	X	3

=== Draw 9 ===
Thursday, January 23, 7:00 pm

Sheet A	1	2	3	4	5	6	7	8	9	10	Final
Corryn Brown 🔨	1	0	4	0	1	0	0	0	0	2	8
Kristen Ryan	0	1	0	1	0	1	0	1	2	0	6

Sheet C	1	2	3	4	5	6	7	8	9	10	Final
Kayla MacMillan	0	2	0	2	0	1	0	0	2	X	7
Dailene Pewarchuk 🔨	0	0	1	0	1	0	1	1	0	X	4

Sheet D	1	2	3	4	5	6	7	8	9	10	Final
Taylor Reese-Hansen 🔨	1	0	1	0	2	3	0	0	2	1	10
Sarah Wark	0	1	0	2	0	0	2	3	0	0	8

Sheet E	1	2	3	4	5	6	7	8	9	10	Final
Holly Hafeli 🔨	0	3	2	0	2	1	0	1	1	X	10
Stephanie Jackson-Baier	0	0	0	1	0	0	3	0	0	X	4

=== Draw 10 ===
Friday, January 26, 9:00 am

Sheet A	1	2	3	4	5	6	7	8	9	10	Final
Holly Hafeli 🔨	0	1	0	1	0	3	0	0	1	0	6
Kayla MacMillan	2	0	1	0	0	0	2	1	0	1	7

Sheet E	1	2	3	4	5	6	7	8	9	10	Final
Dailene Pewarchuk	0	0	0	0	1	0	X	X	X	X	1
Taylor Reese-Hansen 🔨	0	3	3	2	0	3	X	X	X	X	11

=== Draw 11 ===
Friday, January 26, 2:00 pm

Sheet C	1	2	3	4	5	6	7	8	9	10	Final
Taylor Reese-Hansen 🔨	0	1	1	0	2	0	0	1	0	1	6
Holly Hafeli	0	0	0	1	0	1	0	0	1	0	3

Sheet E	1	2	3	4	5	6	7	8	9	10	Final
Corryn Brown	1	0	2	0	2	1	0	0	0	1	7
Sarah Wark 🔨	0	1	0	1	0	0	2	1	0	0	5

=== Draw 12 ===
Friday, January 24, 7:00 pm

Sheet B	1	2	3	4	5	6	7	8	9	10	Final
Kayla MacMillan 🔨	2	0	1	0	0	2	0	1	0	2	8
Corryn Brown	0	2	0	0	1	0	3	0	1	0	7

Sheet C	1	2	3	4	5	6	7	8	9	10	Final
Kristen Ryan	2	1	1	0	2	0	0	1	1	X	8
Stephanie Jackson-Baier 🔨	0	0	0	2	0	2	0	0	0	X	4

== Playoffs ==
Page playoff system
1	Kayla MacMillan	3
2	Corryn Brown	8
3	Kristen Ryan	11
4	Taylor Reese-Hansen	10

Semifinal
1	Kayla MacMillan	7
3	Kristen Ryan	5

Final
2	Corryn Brown	10
1	Kayla MacMillan	7

=== 1 vs. 2 ===
Saturday, January 25, 9:00 am

Sheet D	1	2	3	4	5	6	7	8	9	10	Final
Kayla MacMillan 🔨	0	1	0	1	0	0	0	0	1	0	3
Corryn Brown	0	0	1	0	1	0	0	2	0	4	8

=== 3 vs. 4 ===
Saturday, January 25, 9:00 am

Sheet E	1	2	3	4	5	6	7	8	9	10	11	Final
Kristen Ryan 🔨	1	0	1	3	0	0	1	2	0	2	1	11
Taylor Reese-Hansen	0	2	0	0	2	4	0	0	2	0	0	10

=== Semifinal ===
Saturday, January 25, 2:00 pm

Sheet C	1	2	3	4	5	6	7	8	9	10	Final
Kayla MacMillan 🔨	0	1	0	2	0	2	0	0	0	2	7
Kristen Ryan	0	0	2	0	2	0	0	1	0	0	5

=== Final ===
Sunday, January 26, 9:00 am

Sheet C	1	2	3	4	5	6	7	8	9	10	Final
Corryn Brown 🔨	1	0	3	0	2	0	2	0	2	X	10
Kayla MacMillan	0	2	0	1	0	1	0	3	0	X	7

2025 BC Women's Curling Championship

Corryn Brown
2nd British Columbia Provincial Championship title
