= 2025 Autumn Gold Curling Classic =

- Host city: Okotoks, Alberta
- Arena: Okotoks Curling Club
- Dates: October 10–13
- Winner: (South Korea) Team Gim
- Curling club: Uijeongbu CC, Uijeongbu
- Skip: Gim Eun-ji
- Third: Kim Min-ji
- Second: Kim Su-ji
- Lead: Seol Ye-ji
- Alternate: Seol Ye-eun
- Coach: Shin Dong-ho
- Finalist: (British Columbia) Taylor Reese-Hansen

The 2025 Autumn Gold Curling Classic was held from October 10 to 13 at the Okotoks Curling Club in Okotoks, Alberta. The event was held in a triple-knockout format with a purse of $45,000.

In the final, South Korea's Gim Eun-ji won a record extending fourth consecutive Autumn Gold title, stealing one in an extra end to defeat British Columbia's Taylor Reese-Hansen 8–7. The Gim rink, with Kim Min-ji, Kim Su-ji, Seol Ye-ji and Seol Ye-eun won all six of their games throughout the event, including stolen wins against both Stefania Constantini and Ha Seung-youn to qualify. They then beat Miyu Ueno and Kang Bo-bae in the playoff bracket. Team Reese-Hansen also qualified A side with upset victories over Silvana Tirinzoni, Rebecca Morrison and Corryn Brown. They then successfully defeated Sayaka Yoshimura and Xenia Schwaller in the quarterfinals and semifinals respectively.

== Teams ==
The teams are listed as follows:

Skip	Third	Second	Lead	Alternate	Locale
Emma Artichuk	Jamie Smith	Evelyn Robert	Lauren Rajala		Waterloo, Ontario
Corryn Brown	Erin Pincott	Sarah Koltun	Samantha Fisher		Kamloops, British Columbia
Stefania Constantini	Giulia Zardini Lacedelli	Elena Mathis	Angela Romei	Marta Lo Deserto	Cortina d'Ampezzo, Italy
Janais DeJong					Edmonton, Alberta
Keelie Duncan	Ava Koe	Elizabeth Morgan	Carley Hardie		Calgary, Alberta
Gim Eun-ji	Kim Min-ji	Kim Su-ji	Seol Ye-ji (Note: Alternate Seol Ye-ji played lead, replacing Seol Ye-eun.)	Seol Ye-eun	Uijeongbu, South Korea
Ha Seung-youn	Kim Hye-rin	Yang Tae-i	Kim Su-jin	Park Seo-jin	Chuncheon, South Korea
Fay Henderson	Lisa Davie	Hailey Duff	Katie McMillan	Laura Watt	Stirling, Scotland
Krysta Hilker	Karynn Flory	Jamie Scott	Sydney Libbus		Edmonton, Alberta
Kang Bo-bae	Shim Yu-jeong	Kim Min-seo	Kim Ji-soo	Lee Bo-young	Jeonbuk, South Korea
Ikue Kitazawa	Seina Nakajima	Minori Suzuki	Hasumi Ishigooka		Nagano, Japan
Lila Koe	Abby Whitbread	Andie Ingram	Ella Cardinal		Calgary, Alberta
Kayla MacMillan	Brittany Tran	Lindsay Dubue	Lauren Lenentine	Sarah Loken	Victoria, British Columbia
Kaylee McNamee	Sarah McKinnon	Alex Ashton	Bronte Chin		Calgary, Alberta
Yuina Miura	Kohane Tsuruga	Rin Suzuki	Hana Ikeda	Suzune Yasui	Sapporo, Japan
Rebecca Morrison (Fourth)	Jennifer Dodds	Sophie Sinclair	Sophie Jackson (Skip) (Note: Sophie Jackson skipped Team Morrison.)		Stirling, Scotland
Park You-been	Kim Ji-yoon (Note: Kim Ji-yoon and Lee Eun-chae switched positions for the event.)	Lee Eun-chae	Yang Seung-hee		Seoul, South Korea
Taylor Reese-Hansen	Megan McGillivray	Kim Bonneau	Julianna Mackenzie		Victoria, British Columbia
Gracelyn Richards	Emma Yarmuch	Sophie Ryhorchuk	Amy Wheatcroft	Rachel Jacques	Edmonton, Alberta
Xenia Schwaller	Selina Gafner	Fabienne Rieder	Selina Rychiger		Zurich, Switzerland
Bayly Scoffin	Raelyn Helston	Patty Wallingham	Bailey Horvey		Whitehorse, Yukon
Hillary Selkirk	Joelle Trawick	Kayla Ramstad	Kate Ector		Okotoks, Alberta
Amanda Sluchinski	Kate Goodhelpsen	Anna Munroe	Joanne Tarvit		Edmonton, Alberta
Selena Sturmay	Danielle Schmiemann	Dezaray Hawes	Paige Papley		Edmonton, Alberta
Alina Pätz (Fourth)	Silvana Tirinzoni (Skip)	Carole Howald	Selina Witschonke		Aarau, Switzerland
Miyu Ueno	Yui Ueno	Junko Nishimuro	Asuka Kanai		Karuizawa, Japan
Isabella Wranå	Almida de Val	Maria Larsson	Linda Stenlund		Sundbyberg, Sweden
Sayaka Yoshimura	Kaho Onodera	Yuna Kotani	Anna Ohmiya	Mina Kobayashi	Sapporo, Japan

== Knockout Brackets ==
=== A Event ===
First Knockout	Qualifier 1
(Switzerland) Silvana Tirinzoni	2
(British Columbia) Taylor Reese-Hansen	6	(British Columbia) Taylor Reese-Hansen	7
(Alberta) Selena Sturmay	3	(British Columbia) Taylor Reese-Hansen	6
(South Korea) Kang Bo-bae	7	(Scotland) Team Morrison	4
(Alberta) Kaylee McNamee	4	(South Korea) Kang Bo-bae	3
(Yukon) Bayly Scoffin	6	(Scotland) Team Morrison	7
(Scotland) Team Morrison	7	(British Columbia) Taylor Reese-Hansen	6
(Switzerland) Xenia Schwaller	8	(British Columbia) Corryn Brown	4
(Alberta) Hillary Selkirk	2	(Switzerland) Xenia Schwaller	6
(Alberta) Krysta Hilker	2	(Japan) Miyu Ueno	5
(Japan) Miyu Ueno	8	(Switzerland) Xenia Schwaller	1
(Japan) Yuina Miura	5	(British Columbia) Corryn Brown	5
(British Columbia) Corryn Brown	6	(British Columbia) Corryn Brown	8
(Japan) Sayaka Yoshimura	2

First Knockout	Qualifier 2
(South Korea) Gim Eun-ji	7
(Alberta) Gracelyn Richards	9	(Alberta) Gracelyn Richards	6
(South Korea) Park You-been	3	(South Korea) Gim Eun-ji	6
(Italy) Stefania Constantini	7	(Italy) Stefania Constantini	5
(Alberta) Amanda Sluchinski	2	(Italy) Stefania Constantini	5
(Alberta) Lila Koe	1	(Japan) Ikue Kitazawa	4
(Japan) Ikue Kitazawa	11	(South Korea) Gim Eun-ji	5
(Sweden) Isabella Wranå	9	(South Korea) Ha Seung-youn	4
(Alberta) Janais DeJong	2	(Sweden) Isabella Wranå	5
(Alberta) Keelie Duncan	4	(British Columbia) Kayla MacMillan	6
(British Columbia) Kayla MacMillan	7	(British Columbia) Kayla MacMillan	2
(Ontario) Emma Artichuk	7	(South Korea) Ha Seung-youn	8
(Scotland) Fay Henderson	6	(Ontario) Emma Artichuk	4
(South Korea) Ha Seung-youn	8

=== B Event ===
Second Knockout	To Qualifier 3
(Japan) Yuina Miura	4
(Sweden) Isabella Wranå	9
(Sweden) Isabella Wranå	4
(Scotland) Team Morrison	6
(Scotland) Team Morrison	5
(Switzerland) Xenia Schwaller	4
(Ontario) Emma Artichuk	3
(Alberta) Hillary Selkirk	3	(Alberta) Krysta Hilker	4
(Alberta) Krysta Hilker	6	(Alberta) Krysta Hilker	2	Qualifier 3
(Switzerland) Xenia Schwaller	10
(Scotland) Team Morrison	8
(South Korea) Ha Seung-youn	6

Second Knockout	To Qualifier 3
(Alberta) Selena Sturmay	5
(Japan) Ikue Kitazawa	4
(Alberta) Selena Sturmay	4
(Alberta) Gracelyn Richards	2
(Alberta) Gracelyn Richards	8
(Alberta) Kaylee McNamee	8	(Alberta) Kaylee McNamee	6
(Yukon) Bayly Scoffin	4	(Alberta) Selena Sturmay	2
(South Korea) Ha Seung-youn	10

Second Knockout	To Qualifier 4
(Scotland) Fay Henderson	5
(Japan) Miyu Ueno	8
(Japan) Miyu Ueno	4
(Italy) Stefania Constantini	2
(Japan) Miyu Ueno	4
(Japan) Sayaka Yoshimura	2
(Japan) Sayaka Yoshimura	7
(Alberta) Janais DeJong	6	(Alberta) Keelie Duncan	3
(Alberta) Keelie Duncan	8	(Japan) Sayaka Yoshimura	4	Qualifier 4
(British Columbia) Kayla MacMillan	2
(Japan) Miyu Ueno	4
(South Korea) Kang Bo-bae	6

Second Knockout	To Qualifier 4
(South Korea) Park You-been	4
(South Korea) Kang Bo-bae	5
(South Korea) Kang Bo-bae	7
(Switzerland) Silvana Tirinzoni	1
(Switzerland) Silvana Tirinzoni	11
(Alberta) Amanda Sluchinski	5	(Alberta) Amanda Sluchinski	4
(Alberta) Lila Koe	2	(South Korea) Kang Bo-bae	8
(British Columbia) Corryn Brown	2

=== C Event ===
Third Knockout	Qualifier 5
(Italy) Stefania Constantini	5
(British Columbia) Kayla MacMillan	7
(British Columbia) Kayla MacMillan	2
(Switzerland) Silvana Tirinzoni	6
(Switzerland) Silvana Tirinzoni	9
(Alberta) Hillary Selkirk	7	(Yukon) Bayly Scoffin	2
(Yukon) Bayly Scoffin	9	(Switzerland) Silvana Tirinzoni	4
(South Korea) Ha Seung-youn	1

Third Knockout	Qualifier 6
(Japan) Ikue Kitazawa	9
(Alberta) Kaylee McNamee	1	(Japan) Ikue Kitazawa	3
(British Columbia) Corryn Brown	13
(British Columbia) Corryn Brown	4
(Japan) Yuina Miura	5	(Japan) Sayaka Yoshimura	5
(Ontario) Emma Artichuk	4	(Japan) Yuina Miura	1
(Japan) Sayaka Yoshimura	7

Third Knockout	Qualifier 7
(South Korea) Park You-been	7
(Alberta) Amanda Sluchinski	3	(South Korea) Park You-been	7
(Alberta) Selena Sturmay	6
(South Korea) Park You-been	4
(Scotland) Fay Henderson	7	(Switzerland) Xenia Schwaller	7
(Alberta) Keelie Duncan	1	(Scotland) Fay Henderson	5
(Switzerland) Xenia Schwaller	8

Third Knockout	Qualifier 8
(Alberta) Gracelyn Richards	7
(Alberta) Janais DeJong	4	(Alberta) Lila Koe	6
(Alberta) Lila Koe	7	(Alberta) Gracelyn Richards	8
(Sweden) Isabella Wranå	4
(Sweden) Isabella Wranå	9
(Alberta) Krysta Hilker	1
(Alberta) Gracelyn Richards	2
(Japan) Miyu Ueno	6

== Knockout Results ==
All draw times listed in Mountain Daylight Time (UTC-06:00).

=== Draw 1 ===
Friday, October 10, 9:00 am

Sheet 1	1	2	3	4	5	6	7	8	Final
(Japan) Yuina Miura	0	0	0	0	2	0	2	1	5
(British Columbia) Corryn Brown 🔨	0	1	0	2	0	3	0	0	6

Sheet 2	1	2	3	4	5	6	7	8	Final
(Alberta) Krysta Hilker 🔨	0	2	0	0	0	0	X	X	2
(Japan) Miyu Ueno	0	0	0	3	1	4	X	X	8

Sheet 3	1	2	3	4	5	6	7	8	Final
(Switzerland) Xenia Schwaller	0	3	2	0	1	2	X	X	8
(Alberta) Hillary Selkirk 🔨	1	0	0	1	0	0	X	X	2

Sheet 4	1	2	3	4	5	6	7	8	Final
(Yukon) Bayly Scoffin 🔨	2	1	0	0	0	0	2	1	6
(Scotland) Team Morrison	0	0	2	1	1	3	0	0	7

Sheet 5	1	2	3	4	5	6	7	8	Final
(South Korea) Kang Bo-bae	0	1	0	2	0	2	0	2	7
(Alberta) Kaylee McNamee 🔨	1	0	0	0	1	0	2	0	4

Sheet 6	1	2	3	4	5	6	7	8	Final
(British Columbia) Taylor Reese-Hansen	0	1	0	1	2	0	2	X	6
(Alberta) Selena Sturmay 🔨	1	0	1	0	0	1	0	X	3

=== Draw 2 ===
Friday, October 10, 12:45 pm

Sheet 1	1	2	3	4	5	6	7	8	Final
(Alberta) Keelie Duncan	0	0	2	0	1	1	0	X	4
(British Columbia) Kayla MacMillan 🔨	1	1	0	1	0	0	4	X	7

Sheet 2	1	2	3	4	5	6	7	8	Final
(Ontario) Emma Artichuk 🔨	2	0	2	0	2	0	0	1	7
(Scotland) Fay Henderson	0	2	0	2	0	1	1	0	6

Sheet 3	1	2	3	4	5	6	7	8	Final
(Alberta) Gracelyn Richards	0	0	1	3	0	1	0	4	9
(South Korea) Park You-been 🔨	1	0	0	0	1	0	1	0	3

Sheet 4	1	2	3	4	5	6	7	8	Final
(Italy) Stefania Constantini 🔨	2	0	0	0	1	2	2	X	7
(Alberta) Amanda Sluchinski	0	1	1	0	0	0	0	X	2

Sheet 5	1	2	3	4	5	6	7	8	Final
(Alberta) Lila Koe	0	1	0	0	0	X	X	X	1
(Japan) Ikue Kitazawa 🔨	3	0	4	1	3	X	X	X	11

Sheet 6	1	2	3	4	5	6	7	8	Final
(Sweden) Isabella Wranå 🔨	0	3	0	4	2	0	X	X	9
(Alberta) Janais DeJong	0	0	1	0	0	1	X	X	2

=== Draw 3 ===
Friday, October 10, 4:30 pm

Sheet 1	1	2	3	4	5	6	7	8	Final
(South Korea) Kang Bo-bae	0	0	1	0	2	0	0	X	3
(Scotland) Team Morrison 🔨	0	1	0	3	0	2	1	X	7

Sheet 2	1	2	3	4	5	6	7	8	Final
(Switzerland) Silvana Tirinzoni 🔨	0	1	0	1	0	0	X	X	2
(British Columbia) Taylor Reese-Hansen	1	0	2	0	2	2	X	X	7

Sheet 3	1	2	3	4	5	6	7	8	Final
(Alberta) Kaylee McNamee	0	2	0	2	1	1	2	X	8
(Yukon) Bayly Scoffin 🔨	3	0	1	0	0	0	0	X	4

Sheet 4	1	2	3	4	5	6	7	8	Final
(Alberta) Hillary Selkirk	0	1	0	1	0	1	0	X	3
(Alberta) Krysta Hilker 🔨	2	0	2	0	1	0	1	X	6

Sheet 5	1	2	3	4	5	6	7	8	Final
(British Columbia) Corryn Brown	0	2	0	2	0	4	X	X	8
(Japan) Sayaka Yoshimura 🔨	0	0	1	0	1	0	X	X	2

Sheet 6	1	2	3	4	5	6	7	8	Final
(Switzerland) Xenia Schwaller 🔨	1	0	0	1	0	1	0	3	6
(Japan) Miyu Ueno	0	1	1	0	2	0	1	0	5

=== Draw 4 ===
Friday, October 10, 8:15 pm

Sheet 1	1	2	3	4	5	6	7	8	Final
(Ontario) Emma Artichuk	0	0	0	2	0	2	0	X	4
(South Korea) Ha Seung-youn 🔨	0	1	1	0	2	0	4	X	8

Sheet 2	1	2	3	4	5	6	7	8	9	Final
(Italy) Stefania Constantini	0	0	0	1	0	0	3	0	1	5
(Japan) Ikue Kitazawa 🔨	0	0	1	0	0	2	0	1	0	4

Sheet 3	1	2	3	4	5	6	7	8	Final
(Alberta) Amanda Sluchinski 🔨	2	0	0	1	1	1	0	X	5
(Alberta) Lila Koe	0	1	0	0	0	0	1	X	2

Sheet 4	1	2	3	4	5	6	7	8	Final
(Alberta) Janais DeJong	0	0	0	4	0	1	0	1	6
(Alberta) Keelie Duncan 🔨	3	1	1	0	2	0	1	0	8

Sheet 5	1	2	3	4	5	6	7	8	Final
(Sweden) Isabella Wranå 🔨	2	0	1	0	2	0	0	0	5
(British Columbia) Kayla MacMillan	0	1	0	1	0	2	1	1	6

Sheet 6	1	2	3	4	5	6	7	8	Final
(South Korea) Gim Eun-ji	0	2	0	2	0	2	0	1	7
(Alberta) Gracelyn Richards 🔨	1	0	2	0	1	0	2	0	6

=== Draw 5 ===
Saturday, October 11, 9:00 am

Sheet 1	1	2	3	4	5	6	7	8	Final
(Alberta) Selena Sturmay 🔨	2	0	0	1	0	0	1	1	5
(Japan) Ikue Kitazawa	0	2	1	0	0	1	0	0	4

Sheet 2	1	2	3	4	5	6	7	8	Final
(Switzerland) Xenia Schwaller	0	0	0	0	0	1	X	X	1
(British Columbia) Corryn Brown 🔨	1	1	0	2	1	0	X	X	5

Sheet 3	1	2	3	4	5	6	7	8	Final
(Ontario) Emma Artichuk	0	0	1	2	0	0	0	0	3
(Alberta) Krysta Hilker 🔨	1	1	0	0	1	0	0	1	4

Sheet 4	1	2	3	4	5	6	7	8	Final
(Alberta) Gracelyn Richards 🔨	1	1	1	0	0	0	5	0	8
(Alberta) Kaylee McNamee	0	0	0	3	1	1	0	1	6

Sheet 5	1	2	3	4	5	6	7	8	Final
(British Columbia) Taylor Reese-Hansen	1	0	0	1	1	1	0	2	6
(Scotland) Team Morrison 🔨	0	1	1	0	0	0	2	0	4

Sheet 6	1	2	3	4	5	6	7	8	Final
(Japan) Yuina Miura	0	0	0	0	3	1	0	0	4
(Sweden) Isabella Wranå 🔨	1	1	1	1	0	0	2	3	9

=== Draw 6 ===
Saturday, October 11, 12:45 pm

Sheet 1	1	2	3	4	5	6	7	8	Final
(Switzerland) Silvana Tirinzoni 🔨	2	0	0	3	1	0	1	4	11
(Alberta) Amanda Sluchinski	0	1	1	0	0	2	0	0	4

Sheet 2	1	2	3	4	5	6	7	8	Final
(British Columbia) Kayla MacMillan	0	0	1	0	0	1	0	X	2
(South Korea) Ha Seung-youn 🔨	2	1	0	1	1	0	3	X	8

Sheet 3	1	2	3	4	5	6	7	8	Final
(Japan) Sayaka Yoshimura 🔨	2	0	0	1	1	0	3	X	7
(Alberta) Keelie Duncan	0	1	0	0	0	2	0	X	3

Sheet 4	1	2	3	4	5	6	7	8	Final
(Scotland) Fay Henderson	0	0	1	0	2	2	0	X	5
(Japan) Miyu Ueno 🔨	0	2	0	3	0	0	3	X	8

Sheet 5	1	2	3	4	5	6	7	8	Final
(South Korea) Gim Eun-ji	1	0	0	0	2	0	1	2	6
(Italy) Stefania Constantini 🔨	0	2	1	1	0	1	0	0	5

Sheet 6	1	2	3	4	5	6	7	8	Final
(South Korea) Park You-been	0	0	1	0	1	0	2	X	4
(South Korea) Kang Bo-bae 🔨	0	2	0	2	0	1	0	X	5

=== Draw 7 ===
Saturday, October 11, 4:30 pm

Sheet 1	1	2	3	4	5	6	7	8	Final
(Alberta) Janais DeJong 🔨	0	1	0	0	0	3	0	0	4
(Alberta) Lila Koe	0	0	0	3	1	0	1	2	7

Sheet 2	1	2	3	4	5	6	7	8	Final
(British Columbia) Taylor Reese-Hansen 🔨	2	0	0	1	1	0	0	2	6
(British Columbia) Corryn Brown	0	1	1	0	0	1	1	0	4

Sheet 3	1	2	3	4	5	6	7	8	Final
(Alberta) Selena Sturmay 🔨	1	0	0	1	1	0	1	X	4
(Alberta) Gracelyn Richards	0	1	0	0	0	1	0	X	2

Sheet 4	1	2	3	4	5	6	7	8	Final
(Sweden) Isabella Wranå	0	1	0	1	1	1	0	0	4
(Scotland) Team Morrison 🔨	1	0	2	0	0	0	1	2	6

Sheet 5	1	2	3	4	5	6	7	8	Final
(South Korea) Kang Bo-bae 🔨	3	0	0	3	1	X	X	X	7
(Switzerland) Silvana Tirinzoni	0	1	0	0	0	X	X	X	1

Sheet 6	1	2	3	4	5	6	7	8	Final
(Alberta) Krysta Hilker	0	0	2	0	0	X	X	X	2
(Switzerland) Xenia Schwaller 🔨	2	1	0	5	2	X	X	X	10

=== Draw 8 ===
Saturday, October 11, 8:15 pm

Sheet 1	1	2	3	4	5	6	7	8	Final
(Japan) Miyu Ueno 🔨	0	1	0	0	1	0	0	2	4
(Italy) Stefania Constantini	0	0	1	0	0	0	1	0	2

Sheet 2	1	2	3	4	5	6	7	8	9	Final
(South Korea) Gim Eun-ji	0	0	1	1	0	1	0	1	1	5
(South Korea) Ha Seung-youn 🔨	0	2	0	0	1	0	1	0	0	4

Sheet 3	1	2	3	4	5	6	7	8	Final
(Japan) Ikue Kitazawa 🔨	1	3	5	0	X	X	X	X	9
(Alberta) Kaylee McNamee	0	0	0	1	X	X	X	X	1

Sheet 4	1	2	3	4	5	6	7	8	Final
(South Korea) Park You-been	1	1	0	2	0	2	1	X	7
(Alberta) Amanda Sluchinski 🔨	0	0	1	0	2	0	0	X	3

Sheet 5	1	2	3	4	5	6	7	8	Final
(Yukon) Bayly Scoffin 🔨	2	2	0	3	1	0	1	X	9
(Alberta) Hillary Selkirk	0	0	2	0	0	5	0	X	7

Sheet 6	1	2	3	4	5	6	7	8	Final
(Japan) Sayaka Yoshimura 🔨	0	1	0	0	0	3	0	0	4
(British Columbia) Kayla MacMillan	0	0	0	1	0	0	1	0	2

=== Draw 9 ===
Sunday, October 12, 9:00 am

Sheet 1	1	2	3	4	5	6	7	8	Final
(Scotland) Fay Henderson 🔨	0	2	0	1	0	4	X	X	7
(Alberta) Keelie Duncan	0	0	0	0	1	0	X	X	1

Sheet 2	1	2	3	4	5	6	7	8	Final
(Scotland) Team Morrison	0	2	0	1	0	0	0	2	5
(Switzerland) Xenia Schwaller 🔨	0	0	2	0	1	1	0	0	4

Sheet 3	1	2	3	4	5	6	7	8	Final
(Sweden) Isabella Wranå 🔨	2	2	2	0	0	3	X	X	9
(Alberta) Krysta Hilker	0	0	0	1	0	0	X	X	1

Sheet 4	1	2	3	4	5	6	7	8	Final
(South Korea) Kang Bo-bae 🔨	2	2	0	2	1	1	X	X	8
(British Columbia) Corryn Brown	0	0	2	0	0	0	X	X	2

Sheet 5	1	2	3	4	5	6	7	8	Final
(Alberta) Gracelyn Richards 🔨	0	2	0	1	1	0	0	3	7
(Alberta) Lila Koe	0	0	2	0	0	0	4	0	6

Sheet 6	1	2	3	4	5	6	7	8	Final
(Japan) Yuina Miura 🔨	1	0	2	0	1	0	0	1	5
(Ontario) Emma Artichuk	0	2	0	1	0	1	0	0	4

=== Draw 10 ===
Sunday, October 12, 12:45 pm

Sheet 1	1	2	3	4	5	6	7	8	Final
(Alberta) Gracelyn Richards 🔨	2	2	0	0	2	0	2	X	8
(Sweden) Isabella Wranå	0	0	2	1	0	1	0	X	4

Sheet 2	1	2	3	4	5	6	7	8	Final
(Japan) Miyu Ueno 🔨	0	0	1	1	0	1	1	X	4
(Japan) Sayaka Yoshimura	0	2	0	0	0	0	0	X	2

Sheet 3	1	2	3	4	5	6	7	8	Final
(Italy) Stefania Constantini	0	1	0	2	0	0	2	0	5
(British Columbia) Kayla MacMillan 🔨	1	0	2	0	1	1	0	2	7

Sheet 4	1	2	3	4	5	6	7	8	Final
(Japan) Ikue Kitazawa	0	2	1	0	0	X	X	X	3
(British Columbia) Corryn Brown 🔨	6	0	0	2	5	X	X	X	13

Sheet 5	1	2	3	4	5	6	7	8	Final
(Alberta) Selena Sturmay	0	0	0	1	1	0	X	X	2
(South Korea) Ha Seung-youn 🔨	1	2	1	0	0	6	X	X	10

Sheet 6	1	2	3	4	5	6	7	8	Final
(Switzerland) Silvana Tirinzoni	0	2	0	2	2	3	X	X	9
(Yukon) Bayly Scoffin 🔨	1	0	1	0	0	0	X	X	2

=== Draw 11 ===
Sunday, October 12, 5:00 pm

Sheet 1	1	2	3	4	5	6	7	8	9	Final
(South Korea) Park You-been	0	0	2	0	3	0	1	0	1	7
(Alberta) Selena Sturmay 🔨	0	1	0	3	0	1	0	1	0	6

Sheet 2	1	2	3	4	5	6	7	8	Final
(Scotland) Team Morrison	0	1	0	1	0	5	0	1	8
(South Korea) Ha Seung-youn 🔨	0	0	2	0	2	0	2	0	6

Sheet 3	1	2	3	4	5	6	7	8	Final
(Scotland) Fay Henderson	0	2	0	2	0	0	1	0	5
(Switzerland) Xenia Schwaller 🔨	3	0	2	0	0	0	0	3	8

Sheet 4	1	2	3	4	5	6	7	8	Final
(British Columbia) Kayla MacMillan 🔨	0	1	0	0	1	0	0	X	2
(Switzerland) Silvana Tirinzoni	0	0	2	1	0	2	1	X	6

Sheet 5	1	2	3	4	5	6	7	8	Final
(Japan) Miyu Ueno	0	0	2	0	1	0	1	X	4
(South Korea) Kang Bo-bae 🔨	0	2	0	2	0	2	0	X	6

Sheet 6	1	2	3	4	5	6	7	8	Final
(Japan) Yuina Miura 🔨	0	1	0	0	0	0	X	X	1
(Japan) Sayaka Yoshimura	0	0	2	1	1	3	X	X	7

=== Draw 12 ===
Sunday, October 12, 8:30 pm

Sheet 2	1	2	3	4	5	6	7	8	Final
(British Columbia) Corryn Brown 🔨	1	0	0	3	0	0	0	0	4
(Japan) Sayaka Yoshimura	0	1	0	0	1	1	1	1	5

Sheet 3	1	2	3	4	5	6	7	8	Final
(Switzerland) Silvana Tirinzoni 🔨	0	1	0	0	0	1	2	X	4
(South Korea) Ha Seung-youn	0	0	0	1	0	0	0	X	1

Sheet 4	1	2	3	4	5	6	7	8	Final
(Alberta) Gracelyn Richards	1	0	1	0	0	0	0	X	2
(Japan) Miyu Ueno 🔨	0	1	0	1	0	1	3	X	6

Sheet 5	1	2	3	4	5	6	7	8	Final
(South Korea) Park You-been	0	0	0	2	0	2	0	X	4
(Switzerland) Xenia Schwaller 🔨	1	1	1	0	3	0	1	X	7

== Playoffs ==
Quarterfinals
A2	(South Korea) Gim Eun-ji	10
C4	(Japan) Miyu Ueno	1
C1	(Switzerland) Silvana Tirinzoni	2
B2	(South Korea) Kang Bo-bae	4
B1	(Scotland) Team Morrison	3
C3	(Switzerland) Xenia Schwaller	6
C2	(Japan) Sayaka Yoshimura	4
A1	(British Columbia) Taylor Reese-Hansen	7

Semifinals
A2	(South Korea) Gim Eun-ji	4
B2	(South Korea) Kang Bo-bae	2
C3	(Switzerland) Xenia Schwaller	6
A1	(British Columbia) Taylor Reese-Hansen	7

Final
A2	(South Korea) Gim Eun-ji	8
A1	(British Columbia) Taylor Reese-Hansen	7

=== Quarterfinals ===
Monday, October 13, 9:00 am

Sheet 2	1	2	3	4	5	6	7	8	Final
(Switzerland) Silvana Tirinzoni	0	0	1	0	0	0	1	0	2
(South Korea) Kang Bo-bae 🔨	0	1	0	0	0	2	0	1	4

Sheet 3	1	2	3	4	5	6	7	8	Final
(South Korea) Gim Eun-ji 🔨	2	3	1	0	4	X	X	X	10
(Japan) Miyu Ueno	0	0	0	1	0	X	X	X	1

Sheet 4	1	2	3	4	5	6	7	8	Final
(Scotland) Team Morrison 🔨	0	0	0	1	2	0	0	0	3
(Switzerland) Xenia Schwaller	0	2	1	0	0	2	0	1	6

Sheet 5	1	2	3	4	5	6	7	8	Final
(Japan) Sayaka Yoshimura	0	1	1	0	2	0	0	0	4
(British Columbia) Taylor Reese-Hansen 🔨	2	0	0	1	0	2	0	2	7

=== Semifinals ===
Monday, October 13, 12:15 pm

Sheet 2	1	2	3	4	5	6	7	8	9	Final
(Switzerland) Xenia Schwaller	0	2	0	0	1	0	3	0	0	6
(British Columbia) Taylor Reese-Hansen 🔨	1	0	2	1	0	1	0	1	1	7

Sheet 5	1	2	3	4	5	6	7	8	Final
(South Korea) Gim Eun-ji 🔨	0	0	1	1	1	1	0	X	4
(South Korea) Kang Bo-bae	0	1	0	0	0	0	1	X	2

=== Final ===
Monday, October 13, 3:30 pm

Sheet 2	1	2	3	4	5	6	7	8	9	Final
(South Korea) Gim Eun-ji 🔨	0	2	0	2	0	2	0	1	1	8
(British Columbia) Taylor Reese-Hansen	0	0	2	0	3	0	2	0	0	7
