= 2024 British Columbia Scotties Tournament of Hearts =

Provincial women's curling champsionship

2024 Scotties BC Women's Curling Championship presented by Best Western
- Host city: Esquimalt, British Columbia
- Arena: Archie Browning Sports Centre
- Dates: January 23–28
- Winner: Team Grandy
- Curling club: Vancouver CC, Vancouver
- Skip: Clancy Grandy
- Third: Kayla MacMillan
- Second: Lindsay Dubue
- Lead: Sarah Loken
- Finalist: Corryn Brown

The 2024 Scotties BC Women's Curling Championship, the provincial women's curling championship for British Columbia, was held from January 23 to 28 at the Archie Browning Sports Centre in Esquimalt, British Columbia. The event was held in conjunction with the 2024 BC Men's Curling Championship, the provincial men's curling championship.

The winning Clancy Grandy rink represented British Columbia at the 2024 Scotties Tournament of Hearts in Calgary, Alberta where they finished tied for third in Pool B with a 5–3 record with Manitoba's Kate Cameron. Both Grandy and Cameron met in the last draw of Pool B to determine the final playoff spot, which the Grandy rink lost 7–4 and missing the playoffs as a result.

Additionally, the runner-up Corryn Brown rink also represented British Columbia in the Scotties as a second wild card team replacing Nunavut, who withdrew their entry from the tournament. The Brown rink finished in a five-way tie for third in Pool B with a 4–4 record along with Manitoba's Kaitlyn Lawes, Northern Ontario, Quebec, and Saskatchewan. With tiebreaker games now abolished and the first tiebreaker (which was head-to-head between all tied teams) was tied as well at 2–2, cumulative last stone draw distance between all the teams was used to decide who would make the playoffs. The Brown rink finished with a total of 466.9 but would miss the playoffs as the Lawes rink finished first with a 231.6.

The tournament returned to a round-robin format after the previous three years used a triple knockout.

== Qualification process ==
Qualification method	Berths	Qualifying team(s)
2023 BC Scotties champion	1	Clancy Grandy
BC Women's Tour	4	Corryn Brown; Holly Hafeli; Diane Gushulak; Kristen Ryan
CTRS Leaders	2	Taylor Reese-Hansen; Stephanie Jackson-Baier
Open Qualifier	1	Emily Bowles

== Teams ==
The teams are listed as follows:

Skip	Third	Second	Lead	Alternate	Coach	Club(s)
Emily Bowles	Meredith Cole	Gabby Brissette	Mahra Harris		Logan Miron	Victoria CC, Victoria
Corryn Brown	Erin Pincott	Jennifer Armstrong	Samantha Fisher		Jim Cotter	Kamloops CC, Kamloops
Clancy Grandy	Kayla MacMillan	Lindsay Dubue	Sarah Loken			Vancouver CC, Vancouver
Diane Gushulak	Jessie Sanderson	Layna Pohlod	Kim Dennis	Grace MacInnes	Neil Houston	Royal City CC, New Westminster; Vancouver CC, Vancouver
Holly Hafeli	Jorja Kopytko	Ella Casparis	Natalie Hafeli		Monica Makar	Kamloops CC, Kamloops
Stephanie Jackson-Baier	Kayla Wilson	Liz Bowles	Carley Sandwith-Craig	Sasha Wilson		Victoria CC, Victoria
Taylor Reese-Hansen	Megan McGillivray	Dailene Pewarchuk	Cierra Fisher	Sydney Brilz	Todd Troyer	Victoria CC, Victoria
Kristen Ryan	Shannon Joanisse	Megan Yamamoto	Kirsten Fox		Diane Dezura	Golden Ears WC, Maple Ridge

== Round robin standings ==
Final Round Robin Standings

Key
Teams to Playoffs
Teams to Tiebreaker

Skip	W	L	PF	PA	EW	EL	BE	SE
Clancy Grandy	7	0	68	27	35	17	1	18
Corryn Brown	6	1	57	35	32	22	0	17
Emily Bowles	4	3	45	54	29	32	2	11
Kristen Ryan	3	4	42	59	25	33	2	8
Taylor Reese-Hansen	3	4	47	47	30	31	6	15
Stephanie Jackson-Baier	2	5	43	51	28	30	3	13
Holly Hafeli	2	5	48	68	29	36	0	4
Diane Gushulak	1	6	43	52	27	34	3	8

== Round robin results ==
All draw times listed in Pacific Time (UTC−08:00).

=== Draw 1 ===
Tuesday, January 23, 9:00 am

Sheet B	1	2	3	4	5	6	7	8	9	10	Final
Corryn Brown	1	0	2	1	0	2	1	0	1	X	8
Holly Hafeli 🔨	0	1	0	0	1	0	0	1	0	X	3

Sheet C	1	2	3	4	5	6	7	8	9	10	Final
Clancy Grandy	2	2	1	3	0	1	X	X	X	X	9
Emily Bowles 🔨	0	0	0	0	1	0	X	X	X	X	1

Sheet E	1	2	3	4	5	6	7	8	9	10	Final
Diane Gushulak	2	0	1	0	0	0	0	1	0	1	5
Stephanie Jackson-Baier 🔨	0	0	0	1	0	1	1	0	3	0	6

=== Draw 2 ===
Tuesday, January 23, 2:00 pm

Sheet A	1	2	3	4	5	6	7	8	9	10	Final
Clancy Grandy 🔨	1	0	1	0	1	1	1	0	2	X	7
Diane Gushulak	0	0	0	2	0	0	0	1	0	X	3

Sheet B	1	2	3	4	5	6	7	8	9	10	Final
Stephanie Jackson-Baier 🔨	1	0	3	0	1	0	0	0	0	0	5
Emily Bowles	0	3	0	0	0	0	1	1	2	1	8

Sheet C	1	2	3	4	5	6	7	8	9	10	Final
Taylor Reese-Hansen	0	2	1	1	0	0	0	1	2	0	7
Kristen Ryan 🔨	1	0	0	0	1	2	3	0	0	1	8

=== Draw 3 ===
Tuesday, January 23, 7:00 pm

Sheet D	1	2	3	4	5	6	7	8	9	10	11	Final
Taylor Reese-Hansen	0	1	0	1	3	0	0	1	0	1	0	7
Holly Hafeli 🔨	1	0	2	0	0	2	0	0	2	0	1	8

=== Draw 4 ===
Wednesday, January 24, 9:00 am

Sheet C	1	2	3	4	5	6	7	8	9	10	Final
Kristen Ryan	3	0	0	1	0	0	3	0	3	0	10
Holly Hafeli 🔨	0	3	1	0	2	2	0	2	0	1	11

=== Draw 5 ===
Wednesday, January 24, 2:00 pm

Sheet B	1	2	3	4	5	6	7	8	9	10	Final
Holly Hafeli 🔨	0	3	0	0	0	3	0	1	0	X	7
Stephanie Jackson-Baier	3	0	2	1	2	0	2	0	2	X	12

Sheet D	1	2	3	4	5	6	7	8	9	10	Final
Diane Gushulak 🔨	0	0	3	3	0	0	0	1	0	1	8
Emily Bowles	3	1	0	0	1	1	2	0	1	0	9

Sheet E	1	2	3	4	5	6	7	8	9	10	Final
Corryn Brown 🔨	0	0	2	1	0	1	0	1	4	X	9
Taylor Reese-Hansen	1	1	0	0	0	0	1	0	0	X	3

=== Draw 6 ===
Wednesday, January 24, 7:00 pm

Sheet B	1	2	3	4	5	6	7	8	9	10	Final
Corryn Brown 🔨	1	0	2	3	0	2	1	0	X	X	9
Emily Bowles	0	2	0	0	2	0	0	1	X	X	5

Sheet D	1	2	3	4	5	6	7	8	9	10	Final
Clancy Grandy	1	1	2	0	3	0	0	0	3	X	10
Stephanie Jackson-Baier 🔨	0	0	0	2	0	1	1	1	0	X	5

Sheet E	1	2	3	4	5	6	7	8	9	10	Final
Diane Gushulak 🔨	0	2	0	2	0	0	0	1	0	X	5
Kristen Ryan	0	0	2	0	2	1	1	0	1	X	7

=== Draw 7 ===
Thursday, January 25, 9:00 am

Sheet E	1	2	3	4	5	6	7	8	9	10	Final
Taylor Reese-Hansen	1	1	1	2	0	1	0	0	1	3	10
Emily Bowles 🔨	0	0	0	0	2	0	1	2	0	0	5

=== Draw 8 ===
Thursday, January 25, 2:00 pm

Sheet A	1	2	3	4	5	6	7	8	9	10	11	Final
Corryn Brown	0	3	0	0	0	1	0	1	1	2	1	9
Stephanie Jackson-Baier 🔨	1	0	0	3	1	0	3	0	0	0	0	8

Sheet B	1	2	3	4	5	6	7	8	9	10	Final
Clancy Grandy 🔨	2	0	2	0	2	2	2	X	X	X	10
Kristen Ryan	0	1	0	1	0	0	0	X	X	X	2

Sheet E	1	2	3	4	5	6	7	8	9	10	Final
Diane Gushulak	2	0	1	0	2	0	3	0	2	X	10
Holly Hafeli 🔨	0	1	0	2	0	1	0	2	0	X	6

=== Draw 9 ===
Thursday, January 25, 7:00 pm

Sheet A	1	2	3	4	5	6	7	8	9	10	Final
Holly Hafeli	0	1	1	0	0	0	2	0	2	0	6
Emily Bowles 🔨	1	0	0	1	1	2	0	1	0	1	7

Sheet B	1	2	3	4	5	6	7	8	9	10	Final
Taylor Reese-Hansen	2	3	1	0	0	0	0	2	0	X	8
Diane Gushulak 🔨	0	0	0	2	1	1	1	0	1	X	6

Sheet C	1	2	3	4	5	6	7	8	9	10	Final
Corryn Brown	0	2	0	0	0	0	X	X	X	X	2
Clancy Grandy 🔨	2	0	0	3	1	3	X	X	X	X	9

Sheet D	1	2	3	4	5	6	7	8	9	10	Final
Kristen Ryan	2	2	0	0	0	1	0	0	2	X	7
Stephanie Jackson-Baier 🔨	0	0	1	1	1	0	1	1	0	X	5

=== Draw 10 ===
Friday, January 26, 9:00 am

Sheet A	1	2	3	4	5	6	7	8	9	10	Final
Corryn Brown	0	2	0	2	2	5	X	X	X	X	11
Kristen Ryan 🔨	0	0	1	0	0	0	X	X	X	X	1

Sheet C	1	2	3	4	5	6	7	8	9	10	Final
Taylor Reese-Hansen 🔨	0	0	0	0	3	0	1	0	1	X	5
Stephanie Jackson-Baier	0	0	0	1	0	0	0	1	0	X	2

Sheet E	1	2	3	4	5	6	7	8	9	10	Final
Clancy Grandy	0	3	4	0	3	0	0	4	X	X	14
Holly Hafeli 🔨	2	0	0	2	0	1	2	0	X	X	7

=== Draw 11 ===
Friday, January 26, 2:00 pm

Sheet A	1	2	3	4	5	6	7	8	9	10	Final
Clancy Grandy	0	1	2	1	0	0	2	0	2	1	9
Taylor Reese-Hansen 🔨	4	0	0	0	0	1	0	2	0	0	7

Sheet C	1	2	3	4	5	6	7	8	9	10	Final
Corryn Brown	0	1	0	0	1	1	3	3	0	X	9
Diane Gushulak 🔨	1	0	3	1	0	0	0	0	1	X	6

Sheet D	1	2	3	4	5	6	7	8	9	10	Final
Kristen Ryan	0	0	3	1	0	1	0	2	0	0	7
Emily Bowles 🔨	2	0	0	0	2	0	2	0	2	2	10

== Tiebreaker ==
Friday, January 26, 7:00 pm

Sheet D	1	2	3	4	5	6	7	8	9	10	Final
Kristen Ryan 🔨	1	0	2	0	0	1	0	3	0	1	8
Taylor Reese-Hansen	0	2	0	0	1	0	2	0	2	0	7

== Playoffs ==
Page playoff system
1	Clancy Grandy	8
2	Corryn Brown	3
3	Emily Bowles	4
4	Kristen Ryan	8

Semifinal
2	Corryn Brown	8
4	Kristen Ryan	5

Final
1	Clancy Grandy	11
2	Corryn Brown	3

=== 1 vs. 2 ===
Saturday, January 27, 9:00 am

Sheet B	1	2	3	4	5	6	7	8	9	10	Final
Clancy Grandy 🔨	2	0	0	1	0	1	2	2	X	X	8
Corryn Brown	0	2	0	0	1	0	0	0	X	X	3

=== 3 vs. 4 ===
Saturday, January 27, 2:00 pm

Sheet B	1	2	3	4	5	6	7	8	9	10	Final
Emily Bowles 🔨	0	0	1	0	0	2	0	1	0	X	4
Kristen Ryan	0	3	0	0	1	0	2	0	2	X	8

=== Semifinal ===
Saturday, January 27, 7:00 pm

Sheet B	1	2	3	4	5	6	7	8	9	10	Final
Corryn Brown 🔨	0	0	2	0	3	1	0	2	0	X	8
Kristen Ryan	1	0	0	1	0	0	2	0	1	X	5

=== Final ===
Sunday, January 28, 9:00 am

Sheet B	1	2	3	4	5	6	7	8	9	10	Final
Clancy Grandy 🔨	0	5	2	1	0	3	0	X	X	X	11
Corryn Brown	1	0	0	0	1	0	1	X	X	X	3

2024 British Columbia Scotties Tournament of Hearts

Clancy Grandy
2nd British Columbia Provincial Championship title
