= 2022 British Columbia Scotties Tournament of Hearts =

Provincial women's curling championship

2022 Scotties BC Women's Curling Championship presented by Best Western
- Host city: Kamloops, British Columbia
- Arena: Kamloops Curling Club
- Dates: January 5–9
- Winner: Team Arsenault
- Curling club: Kelowna CC, Kelowna
- Skip: Mary-Anne Arsenault
- Third: Jeanna Schraeder
- Second: Sasha Carter
- Lead: Renee Simons
- Alternate: Morgan Muise
- Coach: Gerry Richard
- Finalist: Kayla MacMillan

The 2022 Scotties BC Women's Curling Championship, the provincial women's curling championship for British Columbia, was held from January 5 to 9 at the Kamloops Curling Club in Kamloops, British Columbia. The winning Mary-Anne Arsenault team represented British Columbia at the 2022 Scotties Tournament of Hearts in Thunder Bay, Ontario, and finished with a 3–5 record. The event was held in conjunction with the 2022 BC Men's Curling Championship, the provincial men's curling championship.

The event was originally intended to be played at the McArthur Island Event Centre, but was moved behind closed-doors to the Kamloops Curling Club due to COVID-19 precautions.

== Teams ==
The teams are listed as follows:

Skip	Third	Second	Lead	Alternate	Club(s)
Mary-Anne Arsenault	Jeanna Schraeder	Sasha Carter	Renee Simons	Morgan Muise	Kelowna CC
Corryn Brown	Erin Pincott	Dezaray Hawes	Samantha Fisher		Kamloops CC / Penticton CC
Shiella Cowan	Sandra Comadina	Stephanie Whittaker-Kask	Kim Slattery	Julie Bellerive	Royal City CC / Vancouver CC / Vernon CC
Diane Gushulak	Grace MacInnes	Stephanie Jackson-Baier	Kim Dennis		Royal City CC / Victoria CC
Shawna Jensen	Layna Pohlod	Catera Park	Elizabeth Bowles		Royal City CC
Kayla MacMillan	Jody Maskiewich	Lindsay Dubue	Sarah Loken		Vancouver CC
Taylor Reese-Hansen	Megan McGillivray	Cierra Fisher	Sydney Brilz		Terrace CC / Kelowna CC / Kamloops CC / Victoria CC
Sarah Wark	Kristen Pilote	Karla Thompson	Amanda Guido		Abbotsford CC

== Knockout brackets ==
=== A event ===
First Knockout	Qualifier 1
Corryn Brown	10
Shawna Jensen	2
Corryn Brown	3
Kayla MacMillan	7
Diane Gushulak	4
Kayla MacMillan	9
Kayla MacMillan	6
Mary-Anne Arsenault	5
Mary-Anne Arsenault	10
Taylor Reese-Hansen	4
Mary-Anne Arsenault	7
Sarah Wark	4
Shiella Cowan	5
Sarah Wark	12

=== B event ===
Second Knockout	Qualifier 2
Mary-Anne Arsenault	8
Diane Gushulak	6
Sarah Wark	5
Shawna Jensen	5	Diane Gushulak	7
Diane Gushulak	9	Diane Gushulak	6
Corryn Brown	4
Corryn Brown	7
Taylor Reese-Hansen	2	Shiella Cowan	5
Shiella Cowan	9

=== C event ===
C Event		Qualifier 3
		Corryn Brown	8
Shawna Jensen	3	Shiella Cowan	1
Shiella Cowan	9

C Event		Qualifier 4
		Diane Gushulak	8
Taylor Reese-Hansen	4	Sarah Wark	10
Sarah Wark	9

== Knockout results ==
All draw times listed in Pacific Time (UTC−08:00).

=== Draw 3 ===
Wednesday, January 5, 9:00 am

Sheet A	1	2	3	4	5	6	7	8	9	10	Final
Mary-Anne Arsenault	1	0	2	1	0	0	2	2	2	X	10
Taylor Reese-Hansen	0	1	0	0	2	1	0	0	0	X	4

Sheet B	1	2	3	4	5	6	7	8	9	10	Final
Corryn Brown	2	0	2	1	0	1	4	X	X	X	10
Shawna Jensen	0	1	0	0	1	0	0	X	X	X	2

Sheet C	1	2	3	4	5	6	7	8	9	10	Final
Diane Gushulak	0	1	0	1	2	0	0	0	0	X	4
Kayla MacMillan	0	0	2	0	0	1	2	1	3	X	9

Sheet D	1	2	3	4	5	6	7	8	9	10	Final
Shiella Cowan	0	0	1	0	2	2	0	0	0	X	5
Sarah Wark	0	2	0	3	0	0	2	2	3	X	12

=== Draw 4 ===
Wednesday, January 5, 2:00 pm

Sheet D	1	2	3	4	5	6	7	8	9	10	Final
Mary-Anne Arsenault	0	2	1	1	1	0	0	2	0	X	7
Sarah Wark	2	0	0	0	0	1	0	0	1	X	4

Sheet E	1	2	3	4	5	6	7	8	9	10	Final
Corryn Brown	0	0	0	1	0	0	2	0	0	0	3
Kayla MacMillan	0	1	0	0	1	2	0	1	1	1	7

=== Draw 5 ===
Wednesday, January 5, 7:00 pm

Sheet D	1	2	3	4	5	6	7	8	9	10	Final
Shawna Jensen	1	0	1	0	0	1	2	0	0	0	5
Diane Gushulak	0	1	0	1	2	0	0	3	1	1	9

Sheet E	1	2	3	4	5	6	7	8	9	10	Final
Taylor Reese-Hansen	1	0	0	0	0	1	0	0	X	X	2
Shiella Cowan	0	1	1	2	1	0	0	4	X	X	9

=== Draw 6 ===
Thursday, January 6, 9:00 am

Sheet A	1	2	3	4	5	6	7	8	9	10	Final
Sarah Wark	0	0	1	2	0	0	1	0	0	1	5
Diane Gushulak	2	0	0	0	1	2	0	1	1	0	7

Sheet C	1	2	3	4	5	6	7	8	9	10	Final
Kayla MacMillan	0	0	2	0	0	0	1	1	0	2	6
Mary-Anne Arsenault	0	2	0	1	0	0	0	0	2	0	5

Sheet D	1	2	3	4	5	6	7	8	9	10	Final
Corryn Brown	0	2	0	2	0	2	0	1	0	X	7
Shiella Cowan	0	0	1	0	1	0	1	0	2	X	5

=== Draw 8 ===
Thursday, January 6, 7:00 pm

Sheet A	1	2	3	4	5	6	7	8	9	10	Final
Shawna Jensen	0	0	0	0	0	3	0	0	X	X	3
Shiella Cowan	1	1	1	1	1	0	1	3	X	X	9

Sheet C	1	2	3	4	5	6	7	8	9	10	Final
Diane Gushulak	0	0	0	1	1	0	1	1	2	X	6
Corryn Brown	0	2	0	0	0	2	0	0	0	X	4

Sheet F	1	2	3	4	5	6	7	8	9	10	Final
Taylor Reese-Hansen	0	0	0	2	0	0	1	1	0	X	4
Sarah Wark	0	2	2	0	1	1	0	0	3	X	9

=== Draw 9 ===
Friday, January 7, 9:00 am

Sheet E	1	2	3	4	5	6	7	8	9	10	Final
Mary-Anne Arsenault	0	0	2	1	1	0	1	0	0	3	8
Diane Gushulak	1	1	0	0	0	1	0	1	2	0	6

=== Draw 10 ===
Friday, January 7, 2:00 pm

Sheet B	1	2	3	4	5	6	7	8	9	10	Final
Diane Gushulak	2	0	1	0	3	0	2	0	0	0	8
Sarah Wark	0	2	0	1	0	2	0	3	1	1	10

Sheet F	1	2	3	4	5	6	7	8	9	10	Final
Corryn Brown	0	0	1	2	3	0	1	1	X	X	8
Shiella Cowan	0	0	0	0	0	1	0	0	X	X	1

== Playoffs ==
Page playoff system
A	Kayla MacMillan	6
B	Mary-Anne Arsenault	5
C1	Corryn Brown	7
C2	Sarah Wark	8

Semifinal
B	Mary-Anne Arsenault	6
C2	Sarah Wark	4

Final
A	Kayla MacMillan	6
B	Mary-Anne Arsenault	8

=== A vs. B ===
Friday, January 7, 7:00 pm

Sheet D	1	2	3	4	5	6	7	8	9	10	11	Final
Kayla MacMillan	0	1	0	1	1	0	1	1	0	0	1	6
Mary-Anne Arsenault	0	0	3	0	0	1	0	0	0	1	0	5

=== C1 vs. C2 ===
Friday, January 7, 7:00 pm

Sheet E	1	2	3	4	5	6	7	8	9	10	Final
Corryn Brown	0	0	0	1	0	2	0	3	0	1	7
Sarah Wark	0	1	1	0	2	0	1	0	3	0	8

=== Semifinal ===
Saturday, January 8, 2:00 pm

Sheet D	1	2	3	4	5	6	7	8	9	10	Final
Mary-Anne Arsenault	0	1	0	2	0	1	0	0	2	X	6
Sarah Wark	0	0	1	0	2	0	0	1	0	X	4

=== Final ===
Sunday, January 9, 9:00 am

Sheet D	1	2	3	4	5	6	7	8	9	10	Final
Kayla MacMillan	0	0	2	1	0	1	1	1	0	0	6
Mary-Anne Arsenault	0	1	0	0	3	0	0	0	3	1	8

2022 British Columbia Scotties Tournament of Hearts

Mary-Anne Arsenault
1st British Columbia Provincial Championship title
