= Megan McGillivray =

Canadian curler

- Curler
- Born: April 26, 1998 (age 28); Edmonton, Alberta

Team
- Curling club: Victoria CC, Victoria, BC
- Skip: Taylor Reese-Hansen
- Third: Megan McGillivray
- Second: Kim Bonneau
- Lead: Julianna Mackenzie

Curling career
- Member Association: British Columbia
- Hearts: 1 (2026)
- Top CTRS ranking: 4th (2025–26)

Megan McGillivray (born April 26, 1998, in Edmonton, Alberta) is a Canadian curler from Victoria, British Columbia. She currently plays third on Team Taylor Reese-Hansen.

== Career ==
=== Women's ===
In 2020, McGillivray competed in her first BC women's championship at the 2020 British Columbia Scotties Tournament of Hearts. As second for Diane Gushulak, the team finished in seventh with a 2–5 record. McGillivray remained with Gushulak for one more season before joining Taylor Reese-Hansen for the 2021–22 season alongside Cierra Fisher and Sydney Brilz. With this team, McGillivray won her first tour event at the King Cash Spiel, defeating Kirsten Ryan 8–2 in the final. At the 2022 British Columbia Scotties Tournament of Hearts, the team finished 0–3 in the triple knockout bracket. The following season, the team had a much better showing at the provincial championship, qualifying for the playoffs through the C event. They then beat Team Ryan in the 3 vs. 4 page playoff game before losing in the semifinal to eventual champion Clancy Grandy, eliminating them in third. To finish the season, they played in the Best of the West U30 event where they lost in the quarterfinals. The next year, at the 2024 British Columbia Scotties Tournament of Hearts, the Reese-Hansen rink finished the round robin with a 3–4 record, enough to qualify them for a tiebreaker. There, they lost 8–7 to Kirsten Ryan and were eliminated. They ended their season with another playoff finish at the Best of the West, losing in the semifinals to Abby Marks.

Following the 2023–24 season, McGillivray and Reese-Hansen revised their lineup, bringing in new front-end players Kim Bonneau and Julianna Mackenzie. This new team found immediate success as they won the U25 NextGen Classic to begin the 2024–25 season. With this win, the team earned the right to play in the 2024 PointsBet Invitational where they lost 5–2 in the opening round to Kaitlyn Lawes. In November, they won another tour title by going undefeated to win the Island Shootout. In the new year, Team Reese-Hansen finished 5–2 through the round robin of the 2025 BC Women's Curling Championship, qualifying as the fourth seeds. They were then eliminated 11–10 by Kristen Ryan in the 3 vs. 4 game.

The 2025–26 season was a breakthrough year for the Reese-Hansen rink as they rose to number three on the CTRS standings. After reaching the quarterfinals at the Saville Grand Prix to start the year, the team advanced all the way to the final of the 2025 Autumn Gold Curling Classic. This included wins over many top ranked teams such as Silvana Tirinzoni, Xenia Schwaller, Sayaka Yoshimura and Rebecca Morrison. Ultimately, they gave up a steal in an extra end to lose to Gim Eun-ji in the championship game. Two weeks later, the team continued their momentum by winning the Lloydminster SaskTour Spiel before reaching another final at the Clarion Cup where they lost to Kayla Skrlik. In November, they made another final at the Crestwood Anniversary Showdown, losing to Miyu Ueno. The following month, they played in the 2025 Canadian Open Tier 2 Grand Slam of Curling event and reached the playoffs with a 2–2 record. They then won both their quarterfinal and semifinal games before coming from behind to knock off Kaitlyn Lawes in the championship game to secure the title. This positioned them for a strong showing at the 2026 BC Women's Curling Championship where the team lost just one game en route to claiming the provincial title, beating Corryn Brown 9–5 in the final. This earned them the right to represent British Columbia at the 2026 Scotties Tournament of Hearts in Mississauga, Ontario. At their first Scotties, the team had mixed results, ultimately finishing sixth in their pool with a 3–5 record.

=== Mixed ===
In 2023, McGillivray won the BC Mixed Championship playing with Cameron de Jong, Taylor Reese-Hansen and Erik Colwell. Representing British Columbia at the 2023 Canadian Mixed Curling Championship, the team failed to qualify for the championship round, placing tenth with a 4–5 record.

== Personal life ==
McGillivray is employed as a kinesiologist at RebalanceMD.

== Teams ==
Season	Skip	Third	Second	Lead
2014–15	Winter Harvey	Jaelyn Cotter	Megan McGillivray	Cassidy Schwaerzle
2015–16	Winter Harvey	Jaelyn Cotter	Megan McGillivray	Cassidy Schwaerzle
2016–17	Megan McGillivray	Winter Harvey	Jaelyn Cotter	Katelyn McGillivray
2017–18	Megan McGillivray	Jaelyn Cotter	Winter Harvey	Cassidy Schwaerzle
2018–19	Megan McGillivray	Jaelyn Cotter	Katelyn McGillivray	Cassidy Schwaerzle
2019–20	Diane Gushulak	Grace MacInnes	Megan McGillivray	Sandra Comadina
2020–21	Diane Gushulak	Grace MacInnes	Megan McGillivray	Sandra Comadina
2021–22	Taylor Reese-Hansen	Megan McGillivray	Cierra Fisher	Sydney Brilz
2022–23	Taylor Reese-Hansen	Megan McGillivray	Cierra Fisher	Sydney Brilz
2023–24	Taylor Reese-Hansen	Megan McGillivray	Dailene Pewarchuk	Sydney Brilz
2024–25	Taylor Reese-Hansen	Megan McGillivray	Kim Bonneau	Julianna Mackenzie
2025–26	Taylor Reese-Hansen	Megan McGillivray	Kim Bonneau	Julianna Mackenzie
2026–27	Taylor Reese-Hansen	Megan McGillivray	Kim Bonneau	Julianna Mackenzie
