= Taylor Reese-Hansen =

Canadian curler (born 1997)

- Curler
- Born: November 22, 1997 (age 28); Kitimat, British Columbia, Canada

Team
- Curling club: Victoria CC, Victoria, BC
- Skip: Taylor Reese-Hansen
- Third: Megan McGillivray
- Second: Kim Bonneau
- Lead: Julianna Mackenzie

Curling career
- Member Association: British Columbia
- Hearts: 1 (2026)
- Top CTRS ranking: 4th (2025–26)

Taylor Reese-Hansen (born November 22, 1997) is a Canadian curler from Kitimat, British Columbia. She currently skips her own team out of Victoria.

== Career ==
=== Juniors ===
In 2018, Reese-Hansen skipped her team of Catera Park, Jordan Koster and Sydney Brilz to victory at the BC Junior Championship. In a tight final with the higher ranked Sarah Daniels rink, Reese-Hansen executed a takeout for a single point in an extra end to win the game 6–5. This sent her team to the 2018 Canadian Junior Curling Championships in Shawinigan where they finished in ninth place with a 5–4 record. Two months later, Reese-Hansen skipped the Camosun Chargers at the 2018 CCAA/Curling Canada College Curling Championships, with her team becoming the first to represent the college at the national level. Playing as three, the team made it to the final where they lost to Fanshawe College, settling for silver. In her final year of junior eligibility, Reese-Hansen lost 10–4 in the provincial final to Team Daniels.

=== Women's ===
Out of juniors, Reese-Hansen joined the Dailene Pewarchuk rink at third. This team reached the 2020 British Columbia Scotties Tournament of Hearts, however, finished at the bottom of the standings with a 1–6 record. After the COVID-19 pandemic cancelled the majority of the 2020–21 season, Reese-Hansen returned to skipping for the 2021–22 season with a new lineup of Megan McGillivray, Cierra Fisher and Sydney Brilz. With this team, Reese-Hansen won her first tour event at the King Cash Spiel, defeating Kirsten Ryan 8–2 in the final. At the 2022 British Columbia Scotties Tournament of Hearts, the team finished 0–3 in the triple knockout bracket. The following season, the team had a much better showing at the provincial championship, qualifying for the playoffs through the C event. They then beat Team Ryan in the 3 vs. 4 page playoff game before losing in the semifinal to eventual champion Clancy Grandy, eliminating them in third. To finish the season, they played in the Best of the West U30 event where they lost in the quarterfinals. The next year, at the 2024 British Columbia Scotties Tournament of Hearts, the Reese-Hansen rink finished the round robin with a 3–4 record, enough to qualify them for a tiebreaker. There, they lost 8–7 to Kirsten Ryan and were eliminated. They ended their season with another playoff finish at the Best of the West, losing in the semifinals to Abby Marks.

Following the 2023–24 season, Reese-Hansen revised her lineup, bringing in new front-end players Kim Bonneau and Julianna Mackenzie with Megan McGillivray continuing to play third. This new team found immediate success as they won the U25 NextGen Classic to begin the 2024–25 season. With this win, the team earned the right to play in the 2024 PointsBet Invitational where they lost 5–2 in the opening round to Kaitlyn Lawes. In November, they won another tour title by going undefeated to win the Island Shootout. In the new year, Team Reese-Hansen finished 5–2 through the round robin of the 2025 BC Women's Curling Championship, qualifying as the fourth seeds. They were then eliminated 11–10 by Kristen Ryan in the 3 vs. 4 game.

The 2025–26 season was a breakthrough year for the Reese-Hansen rink as they rose to number three on the CTRS standings. After reaching the quarterfinals at the Saville Grand Prix to start the year, the team advanced all the way to the final of the 2025 Autumn Gold Curling Classic. This included wins over many top ranked teams such as Silvana Tirinzoni, Xenia Schwaller, Sayaka Yoshimura and Rebecca Morrison. Ultimately, they gave up a steal in an extra end to lose to Gim Eun-ji in the championship game. Two weeks later, the team continued their momentum by winning the Lloydminster SaskTour Spiel before reaching another final at the Clarion Cup where they lost to Kayla Skrlik. In November, they made another final at the Crestwood Anniversary Showdown, losing to Miyu Ueno. The following month, they played in the 2025 Canadian Open Tier 2 Grand Slam of Curling event and reached the playoffs with a 2–2 record. They then won both their quarterfinal and semifinal games before coming from behind to knock off Kaitlyn Lawes in the championship game to secure the title. This positioned them for a strong showing at the 2026 BC Women's Curling Championship where the team lost just one game en route to claiming the provincial title, beating Corryn Brown 9–5 in the final. This earned them the right to represent British Columbia at the 2026 Scotties Tournament of Hearts in Mississauga, Ontario. At their first Scotties, the team had mixed results, ultimately finishing sixth in their pool with a 3–5 record.

=== Mixed ===
In 2019, Reese-Hansen won the 2019 BC Mixed Championship playing with Cameron de Jong, Alex Horvath and Mariah Coulombe. This qualified the foursome for the 2020 Canadian Mixed Curling Championship in Jonquière, Saguenay where they finished in sixth place with a 5–5 record. Four years later, the team again won the provincial championship, this time with Erik Colwell and Megan McGillivray on the front end. Representing British Columbia at the 2023 Canadian Mixed Curling Championship, the team failed to qualify for the championship round, placing tenth with a 4–5 record.

=== Mixed doubles ===
Reese-Hansen began playing mixed doubles during the 2022–23 season, forming a team with Corey Chester. This pairing found immediate success by going undefeated to claim the Nanaimo Double Doubles Spiel. Later that season, they made it to the provincial final where they were defeated by Sarah Loken and Cody Tanaka. To begin the 2023–24 season, Reese-Hansen and Chester won the Victoria Mixed Doubles Cash Spiel and reached the semifinals of the Chilliwack Championship. They also reached the final of the first Alberta Curling Series event, losing to Laura Walker and Kirk Muyres. In December, the duo won their first mixed doubles provincial as a team, downing Gabby Brissette and Sterling Middleton 10–2 in the championship game. This sent them to the 2024 Canadian Mixed Doubles Curling Championship where they topped their pool with a 6–1 record, earning a direct bye into the quarterfinal round. They then lost 7–5 to Madison and Rylan Kleiter, eliminating them from contention. The following season, the pair won another tour event in Parksville. Despite not winning one of the direct-entry berths into the 2025 Canadian Mixed Doubles Curling Olympic Trials, Reese-Hansen and Chester qualified for the Trials as the third highest ranked team on the points standings that was not already qualified. There, they finished sixth in their pool with a 2–5 record.

== Personal life ==
Reese-Hansen is employed as a safety & projects administrator at Zanron Mechanical Services. Her great grandmother is 1955 BC women's champion Vi Bush. She previously studied athletic therapy at Camosun College.

== Grand Slam record ==
Key
C	Champion
F	Lost in Final
SF	Lost in Semifinal
QF	Lost in Quarterfinals
R16	Lost in the round of 16
Q	Did not advance to playoffs
T2	Played in Tier 2 event
DNP	Did not participate in event
N/A	Not a Grand Slam event that season

Event	2025–26	2026–27
Invitational	DNP	Q
Masters	DNP	Q
Open	T2	DNP

== Teams ==
Season	Skip	Third	Second	Lead
2015–16	Taylor Reese-Hansen	Catera Park	Jordan Koster	Sydney Brilz
2016–17	Taylor Reese-Hansen	Catera Park	Jordan Koster	Sydney Brilz
2017–18	Taylor Reese-Hansen	Catera Park	Jordan Koster	Sydney Brilz
2018–19	Taylor Reese-Hansen	Catera Park	Jordan Koster	Sydney Brilz
2019–20	Dailene Pewarchuk	Taylor Reese-Hansen	Ashley Sanderson	Sydney Brilz
2021–22	Taylor Reese-Hansen	Megan McGillivray	Cierra Fisher	Sydney Brilz
2022–23	Taylor Reese-Hansen	Megan McGillivray	Cierra Fisher	Sydney Brilz
2023–24	Taylor Reese-Hansen	Megan McGillivray	Dailene Pewarchuk	Sydney Brilz
2024–25	Taylor Reese-Hansen	Megan McGillivray	Kim Bonneau	Julianna Mackenzie
2025–26	Taylor Reese-Hansen	Megan McGillivray	Kim Bonneau	Julianna Mackenzie
2026–27	Taylor Reese-Hansen	Megan McGillivray	Kim Bonneau	Julianna Mackenzie
