= 2023 British Columbia Scotties Tournament of Hearts =

Provincial women's curling championship

2023 Scotties BC Women's Curling Championship presented by Best Western
- Host city: Chilliwack, British Columbia
- Arena: Chilliwack Curling Club
- Dates: January 11–15
- Winner: Team Grandy
- Curling club: Vancouver CC, Vancouver
- Skip: Clancy Grandy
- Third: Kayla MacMillan
- Second: Lindsay Dubue
- Lead: Sarah Loken
- Coach: Katie Witt
- Finalist: Corryn Brown

The 2023 Scotties BC Women's Curling Championship, the provincial women's curling championship for British Columbia, was held from January 11 to 15 at the Chilliwack Curling Club in Chilliwack, British Columbia. The event was held in conjunction with the 2023 BC Men's Curling Championship, the provincial men's curling championship.

The winning Clancy Grandy rink represented British Columbia at the 2023 Scotties Tournament of Hearts on home soil in Kamloops, British Columbia where they made the Championship round losing to Manitoba 9–4.

== Qualification process ==
Qualification method	Berths	Qualifying team(s)
CTRS Leaders	2	Clancy Grandy; Corryn Brown
BC Curling Tour	2	Diane Gushulak; Shawna Jensen
Open Qualifier	4	Kristen Ryan; Taylor Reese-Hansen; Shiella Cowan; Sarah Wark

== Teams ==
The teams are listed as follows:

Skip	Third	Second	Lead	Alternate	Club(s)
Corryn Brown	Erin Pincott	Dezaray Hawes	Samantha Fisher		Kamloops CC / Penticton CC
Shiella Cowan	Sandra Comadina	Stephanie Whittaker-Kask	Christine Matthews		Royal City CC / Vancouver CC
Clancy Grandy	Kayla MacMillan	Lindsay Dubue	Sarah Loken		Vancouver CC
Brette Richards (Fourth)	Blaine de Jager	Alyssa Kyllo	Diane Gushulak (Skip)	Grace MacInnes	Vernon CC / Royal City CC / Prince George CC / Winfield CC
Shawna Jensen	Layna Pohlod	Sarah Wong	Amanda Wong		Richmond CC / Royal City CC
Taylor Reese-Hansen	Megan McGillivray	Cierra Fisher	Sydney Brilz	Dailene Pewarchuk	Victoria CC / Kamloops CC
Kristen Ryan	Megan Daniels	Kirsten Fox	Dawn Mesana		Golden Ears WC
Sarah Wark	Kristen Pilote	Karla Thompson	Amanda Brennan		Abbotsford CC

== Knockout brackets ==
=== A event ===
First Knockout	Qualifier 1
Clancy Grandy	9
Shiella Cowan	3
Clancy Grandy	12
Kristen Ryan	7
Shawna Jensen	3
Kristen Ryan	10
Clancy Grandy	8
Corryn Brown	10
Diane Gushulak	7
Taylor Reese-Hansen	9
Taylor Reese-Hansen	7
Corryn Brown	9
Corryn Brown	8
Sarah Wark	5

=== B event ===
Second Knockout	Qualifier 2
Clancy Grandy	9
Kristen Ryan	3
Taylor Reese-Hansen	10
Shiella Cowan	5	Shiella Cowan	6
Shawna Jensen	4	Taylor Reese-Hansen	3
Kristen Ryan	5
Kristen Ryan	9
Diane Gushulak	7	Sarah Wark	8
Sarah Wark	9

=== C event ===
C Event		Qualifier 3
		Taylor Reese-Hansen	7
Shawna Jensen	7	Shawna Jensen	6
Sarah Wark	6

C Event		Qualifier 4
		Kristen Ryan	7
Shiella Cowan	0	Diane Gushulak	6
Diane Gushulak	9

== Knockout results ==
All draw times listed in Pacific Time (UTC−08:00).

=== Draw 1 ===
Wednesday, January 11, 9:00 am

Sheet A	1	2	3	4	5	6	7	8	9	10	Final
Clancy Grandy 🔨	3	1	3	1	0	0	0	1	X	X	9
Shiella Cowan	0	0	0	0	1	1	1	0	X	X	3

Sheet B	1	2	3	4	5	6	7	8	9	10	Final
Shawna Jensen 🔨	0	0	1	0	0	1	0	1	0	0	3
Kristen Ryan	0	1	0	1	1	0	1	0	2	4	10

Sheet E	1	2	3	4	5	6	7	8	9	10	Final
Diane Gushulak 🔨	1	0	2	0	0	0	2	0	2	0	7
Taylor Reese-Hansen	0	1	0	0	2	1	0	1	0	4	9

Sheet F	1	2	3	4	5	6	7	8	9	10	Final
Corryn Brown 🔨	0	0	0	1	0	0	0	3	0	4	8
Sarah Wark	0	0	1	0	2	0	1	0	1	0	5

=== Draw 2 ===
Wednesday, January 11, 2:00 pm

Sheet A	1	2	3	4	5	6	7	8	9	10	11	Final
Diane Gushulak	1	0	1	0	0	2	1	0	2	0	0	7
Sarah Wark 🔨	0	1	0	2	1	0	0	1	0	2	2	9

Sheet E	1	2	3	4	5	6	7	8	9	10	Final
Shiella Cowan 🔨	0	0	0	0	2	0	1	1	0	1	5
Shawna Jensen	0	0	1	0	0	2	0	0	1	0	4

=== Draw 3 ===
Wednesday, January 11, 7:00 pm

Sheet A	1	2	3	4	5	6	7	8	9	10	Final
Taylor Reese-Hansen 🔨	0	1	0	0	2	0	1	0	3	X	7
Corryn Brown	2	0	0	2	0	3	0	2	0	X	9

Sheet E	1	2	3	4	5	6	7	8	9	10	Final
Clancy Grandy 🔨	0	2	0	3	0	2	1	3	1	X	12
Kristen Ryan	2	0	1	0	4	0	0	0	0	X	7

=== Draw 4 ===
Thursday, January 12, 9:00 am

Sheet C	1	2	3	4	5	6	7	8	9	10	Final
Taylor Reese-Hansen 🔨	3	0	2	0	0	0	1	0	3	1	10
Shiella Cowan	0	1	0	1	1	1	0	2	0	0	6

Sheet D	1	2	3	4	5	6	7	8	9	10	Final
Kristen Ryan 🔨	3	0	0	2	1	0	0	2	0	1	9
Sarah Wark	0	0	2	0	0	3	1	0	2	0	8

=== Draw 5 ===
Thursday, January 12, 2:00 pm

Sheet B	1	2	3	4	5	6	7	8	9	10	Final
Taylor Reese-Hansen 🔨	0	0	1	1	0	0	0	1	0	0	3
Kristen Ryan	1	0	0	0	0	1	1	0	1	1	5

Sheet C	1	2	3	4	5	6	7	8	9	10	Final
Clancy Grandy 🔨	3	0	0	2	1	0	0	0	2	0	8
Corryn Brown	0	2	3	0	0	1	1	1	0	2	10

=== Draw 6 ===
Thursday, January 12, 7:00 pm

Sheet A	1	2	3	4	5	6	7	8	9	10	Final
Shiella Cowan 🔨	0	0	0	0	0	X	X	X	X	X	0
Diane Gushulak	2	1	4	1	1	X	X	X	X	X	9

Sheet B	1	2	3	4	5	6	7	8	9	10	Final
Shawna Jensen 🔨	0	1	0	1	0	0	1	1	0	3	7
Sarah Wark	1	0	1	0	1	1	0	0	2	0	6

Sheet F	1	2	3	4	5	6	7	8	9	10	Final
Clancy Grandy 🔨	3	1	0	1	0	1	2	1	X	X	9
Kristen Ryan	0	0	3	0	0	0	0	0	X	X	3

=== Draw 7 ===
Friday, January 13, 9:00 am

Sheet A	1	2	3	4	5	6	7	8	9	10	11	Final
Taylor Reese-Hansen 🔨	1	0	0	0	0	1	0	2	0	2	1	7
Shawna Jensen	0	0	0	0	3	0	1	0	2	0	0	6

Sheet E	1	2	3	4	5	6	7	8	9	10	Final
Kristen Ryan 🔨	0	0	1	0	2	0	2	1	0	1	7
Diane Gushulak	1	0	0	3	0	1	0	0	1	0	6

== Playoffs ==
Page playoff system
A	Corryn Brown	12
B	Clancy Grandy	8
C1	Taylor Reese-Hansen	7
C2	Kristen Ryan	6

Semifinal
B	Clancy Grandy	12
C1	Taylor Reese-Hansen	4

Final
A	Corryn Brown	9
B	Clancy Grandy	10

=== A vs. B ===
Friday, January 13, 7:00 pm

Sheet F	1	2	3	4	5	6	7	8	9	10	Final
Corryn Brown 🔨	0	2	0	1	0	6	1	0	2	X	12
Clancy Grandy	1	0	2	0	4	0	0	1	0	X	8

=== C1 vs. C2 ===
Friday, January 13, 7:00 pm

Sheet D	1	2	3	4	5	6	7	8	9	10	11	Final
Taylor Reese-Hansen 🔨	1	0	0	1	0	1	0	1	0	2	1	7
Kristen Ryan	0	1	1	0	2	0	1	0	1	0	0	6

=== Semifinal ===
Saturday, January 14, 2:00 pm

Sheet E	1	2	3	4	5	6	7	8	9	10	Final
Clancy Grandy 🔨	1	0	2	0	3	2	1	2	1	X	12
Taylor Reese-Hansen	0	2	0	2	0	0	0	0	0	X	4

=== Final ===
Sunday, January 15, 9:00 am

Sheet E	1	2	3	4	5	6	7	8	9	10	11	Final
Corryn Brown 🔨	0	0	5	0	0	1	0	2	0	1	0	9
Clancy Grandy	2	1	0	1	1	0	2	0	2	0	1	10

2023 British Columbia Scotties Tournament of Hearts

Clancy Grandy
1st British Columbia Provincial Championship title
