= Samantha Fisher (curler) =

Canadian curler

- Curler
- Born: Samantha Fisher; September 19, 1995 (age 31); Kamloops, British Columbia

Team
- Curling club: McArthur Island CC, Kamloops, BC
- Skip: Kayla Skrlik
- Third: Myla Plett
- Second: Sarah Koltun
- Lead: Samantha Fisher

Curling career
- Member Association: British Columbia (2010–2026); Alberta (2026–present)
- Hearts: 3 (2021, 2024, 2025)
- World Junior Curling Championship: 1 (2013)
- Top CTRS ranking: 6th (2024–25)
Medal record
Women's Curling
Representing British Columbia
Canada Winter Games
Gold medal – first place	2011 Halifax

Samantha Brianna Fisher (born September 19, 1995) is a Canadian curler from Kamloops, British Columbia. She currently plays lead on Team Kayla Skrlik.

== Career ==
=== Junior career ===
Fisher first joined the Corryn Brown rink at age 11. Playing second for the team, Fisher won a gold medal at the 2011 Canada Winter Games for British Columbia after winning the 2010 BC Winter games gold medal. They represented the province at the 2013 Canadian Junior Curling Championships, which they also won. This qualified the team to represent Canada at the 2013 World Junior Curling Championships, where they finished with a 3–6 record. The team lost in the finals of the BC Juniors the following year. The team began the 2014–15 season by winning the Coronation Business Group Classic event on the World Curling Tour (WCT). Later in the year, the team won the 2015 BC Juniors. At the 2015 Canadian Junior Curling Championships, the team finished in third place. The same year, the team won a silver medal at the 2015 CIS/CCA Curling Championships for Thompson Rivers University. The next season, the team lost in the finals of the 2016 BC juniors. Later on that year, the team won another silver medal for Thompson Rivers at the 2016 CIS/CCA Curling Championships. In her final season in juniors, Fisher moved from second to lead on the team after the addition of Dezaray Hawes to the rink at second. With the new lineup, the Brown rink won their third BC junior women's championship. At the 2017 Canadian Junior Curling Championships, the team finished with a 5–5 record, missing the playoffs. On the World Curling Tour that season, the team won the 2016 Qinghai China Women's International.

=== Women's career ===
In their first season out of juniors, the Brown rink played in the 2018 British Columbia Scotties Tournament of Hearts, where they lost to Karla Thompson in the semifinal. Later on that season, the team represented Thompson Rivers once again at the 2018 National University championships, winning a third silver medal.

Wanting to focus on her studies, Fisher did not curl competitively between 2018 and 2020 (except for playing at the 2019 BC Mixed Doubles championship), and was replaced on the Brown rink by Ashley Klymchuk. After Fisher graduated, and Klymchuk became pregnant with twins and Fisher re-joined the team. In her first season back on the team, they won the Kelowna Double Cash WCT event. The 2021 British Columbia Scotties Tournament of Hearts was cancelled due to the COVID-19 pandemic in British Columbia, so Curl BC appointed the Brown rink (who had won the 2020 British Columbia Scotties Tournament of Hearts without Fisher) as the team's representatives at the 2021 Scotties Tournament of Hearts, Canada's national women's championship – Fisher's first. At the Hearts, they finished a 4–4 round robin record, failing to qualify for the championship round.

To begin the 2021–22 season, the Brown rink won the Alberta Curling Series: Leduc event. They then played in the 2021 Alberta Curling Series: Saville Shoot-Out where they went undefeated until the semifinals where they were defeated by Laura Walker. Due to the pandemic, the qualification process for the 2021 Canadian Olympic Curling Trials had to be modified to qualify enough teams for the championship. In these modifications, Curling Canada created the 2021 Canadian Curling Trials Direct-Entry Event, an event where five teams would compete to try to earn one of three spots into the 2021 Canadian Olympic Curling Trials. Team Brown qualified for the Trials Direct-Entry Event due to their CTRS ranking from the 2019–20 season. At the event, the team went 1–3 through the round robin, qualifying for the tiebreaker round where they faced Alberta's Walker rink. After winning the first game, Team Brown lost the second and final tiebreaker, not earning direct qualification into the Trials. The team had one final chance to advance to the Olympic Trials through the 2021 Canadian Olympic Curling Pre-Trials where they finished the round-robin with a 4–2 record. This qualified them for the double knockout round, where they beat both Mackenzie Zacharias and Sherry Anderson to advance to the final qualifier. There, they lost 9–2 to Jacqueline Harrison, ending their chances of reaching the Olympic Trials. Back on tour, the team played in their first Grand Slam of Curling event, the 2021 National, which they qualified for due to their successful results throughout the season. They finished 2–3 through the triple knockout event, just missing the playoffs. At the 2022 British Columbia Scotties Tournament of Hearts, Team Brown entered as the number one seeds, however, lost two qualifying games against Kayla MacMillan and Diane Gushulak, qualifying through the C side. They then lost the 3 vs. 4 game to Sarah Wark, eliminating them from provincials. They finished their season at the inaugural Best of the West championship where they won the title.

Team Brown struggled at the beginning of the 2022–23 season, failing to qualify for the playoffs in their first three events. They turned thing around at the Prestige Hotels & Resorts Curling Classic, losing just one game en route to capturing the event title. Later that month, they won their second title at the Kamloops Crown of Curling. Despite only entering the playoffs in two of their eight tour events, Team Brown found immediate success at the 2023 British Columbia Scotties Tournament of Hearts, defeating the number one ranked Clancy Grandy rink in both the A qualifier and the 1 vs. 2 page playoff. In the final, again facing Grandy, they fell 10–9 in an extra end, failing to qualify for the 2023 Scotties Tournament of Hearts which was held in their home city of Kamloops. At the end of the season, the team again won the Best of the West championship, defeating Manitoba's Kelsey Rocque 6–1 in the final. In March 2023, the team announced they would be parting ways with second Dezaray Hawes. They later announced Jennifer Armstrong would join them as their new second for the 2023–24 season.

== Personal life ==
Fisher attended Valleyview Secondary School in Kamloops. She graduated from Thompson Rivers University in 2020 with a diploma in respiratory therapy, and immediately began work for Interior Health at the Royal Inland Hospital. Fisher's father, Brian was one of her team's junior coaches and represented BC at the 1990 Canadian Junior Curling Championships. She is married to fellow curler Jared Kolomaya.
