= List of teams on the 2014–15 World Curling Tour =

The following is a list of teams that participated on the 2014–15 World Curling Tour.

== Men ==
As of September 13, 2014

Skip	Third	Second	Lead	Alternate	Locale
Jason Ackerman	Curtis Horwath	Brent Goeres	Mike Armstrong		Regina, Saskatchewan
Josh Adams	Spencer Cooper	Keith Coulthart	Craig Skochinski		Ottawa, Ontario
Steven Andrews	Steve Swarbrick	Brent Nicol	Stewart Holditch		Coaldale, Alberta
Felix Attinger	Bastian Brun	Daniel Schifferli	Urs Kuhn		Switzerland
Mike Johnson (fourth)	Chris Baier (skip)	Corey Chester	Sanjay Bowry		Victoria, British Columbia
Greg Balsdon	Mark Bice	Tyler Morgan	Jamie Farnell	Steve Bice	Hamilton, Ontario
Alexander Baumann	Manuel Walter	Sebastian Schweizer	Marc Bastian	Jorg Engesser	Füssen, Germany
Cliff Beaulieu	John Gessner	Shawn Demianyk	Marc Compte		Winnipeg, Manitoba
Travis Belchior	Jeff Brown	Kris Krasowski	Michael Checca		Oakville, Ontario
Todd Birr	Doug Pottinger	Greg Johnson	Tom O'Connor		Blaine, Minnesota
Scott Bitz	Jeff Sharp	Aryn Schmidt	Dean Hicke		Regina, Saskatchewan
Matthew Blandford	Darren Moulding	Brent Hamilton	Brad Chyz		Calgary, Alberta
Dimitri Boada	Vincent Huguelet	Julien Jaquet	Jeremy Delay		Switzerland
Trevor Bonot	Kory Carr	Jordan Potts	Joel Adams		Thunder Bay, Ontario
Brendan Bottcher	Tom Appelman	Bradley Thiessen	Karrick Martin		Edmonton, Alberta
Don Bowser	Jonathan Beuk	Wesley Forget	Scott Chadwick		Kingston, Ontario
Len Brossart	Vic Gruber	Garth Rabel	Arlen Masson		Airdrie, Alberta
Matt Dupuis	Dan Cook	Ian Bridger	Doug Brewer	Trevor Brewer	Cornwall, Ontario
Tom Brewster	Glen Muirhead	Ross Paterson	Hammy McMillan Jr.	Thomas Muirhead	Aberdeen, Scotland
Mark Brown	Mike Callahan	Gary McKnight	Jamie Graham		North Bay, Ontario
Rolf Bruggmann	Michael Joller	Cyril Bettschen	Fabian Beck	Joel Bettschen	Switzerland
Jed Brundidge	Kyle Richards	Dan Ruehl	John Gordon		St. Paul, Minnesota
Michael Brunner	Marc Wagenseil	Remo Herzog	Raymond Krenger	Lars Nielsen	Switzerland
Braden Calvert	Kyle Kurz	Lucas Van Den Bosch	Brendan Wilson		Winnipeg, Manitoba
Mac Calwell	Kurt Armstrong	Morgan Calwell	Matt Pretty		Belleville, Ontario
Reid Carruthers	Braeden Moskowy	Derek Samagalski	Colin Hodgson		Winnipeg, Manitoba
Adam Casey	Josh Barry	Anson Carmody	Robbie Doherty		Charlottetown, Prince Edward Island
Brady Clark	Greg Persinger	Matt Birklid	Phil Tilker		(Washington (state)) Seattle
Robert Collins	Scott Sawatzky	Colin Stroeder	Robert Currie		Calgary, Alberta
Rene Comeau	Andrew Burgess	Alex MacNeil	Ryan Freeze		Fredericton, New Brunswick
Terry Corbin	Kelly Schuh	Andrew Tournay	James Freeman		Brantford, Ontario
Denis Cordick		Doug McDermott	Richard Garden		Georgetown, Ontario
Peter Corner	Graeme McCarrel	Codey Maus	Craig Kochan		(Ontario) Toronto
Jim Cotter	Ryan Kuhn	Tyrel Griffith	Rick Sawatsky		Kelowna/Vernon, British Columbia
Warren Cross	Dean Darwent	Dwight Alfrey	Doug McNish		Edmonton, Alberta
Clint Cudmore	Dan Lemieux	Stephane Lemieux	Marc Barrette		Sault Ste. Marie, Ontario
Jeff Currie	Mike McCarville	Colin Koivula	Jamie Childs		Thunder Bay, Ontario
Mark Dacey	Stuart Thompson	Stephen Burgess	Andrew Gibson		Halifax, Nova Scotia
Jamie Danbrook	Kendal Thompson	Bryce Everist	Brendan Lavell		Halifax, Nova Scotia
Neil Dangerfield	Dennis Sutton	Darren Boden	Glen Allen		Victoria, British Columbia
Benoît Schwarz (fourth)	Peter de Cruz (skip)	Claudio Pätz	Valentin Tanner		Geneva, Switzerland
Robert Desjardins	Louis Biron	Frederic Lawton	Maurice Cayouette		Chicoutimi, Quebec
Steve Holdaway (fourth)	Matthew Mitchell	Zachary Wise	Robert Derry (skip)		Montreal, Quebec
Kevin MacKenzie	Grant Dezura (skip)	Jamie Smith	Kevin Recksiedler		Maple Ridge, British Columbia
Ian Dickie	Tyler Stewart	Aaron Stewart	Evan Lilly		Ontario
Clint Dieno	Jason Jacobson	Tony Korol	Rory Golanowski		Saskatoon, Saskatchewan
Shawn Donnelly	Matthew Brown	Michael Hauer	Kenton Maschmeyer		Edmonton, Alberta
Colin Dow	Ritchie Gillan	Brett Lyon-Hatcher	John Steski		(Ontario) Ottawa
Korey Dropkin	Thomas Howellm	Mark Fenner	Luc Violette	Andrew Stopera	Blaine, Minnesota
Stephen Dropkin	Blake Morton	Kyle Kakela	Evan Jensen		St. Paul, Minnesota
Alexey Stukalskiy (fourth)	Evgeniy Arkhipov	Andrey Drozdov (skip)	Petr Dron		Moscow, Russia
Matt Dunstone	Jim Coleman	Daniel Grant	Chris Gallant		Winnipeg, Manitoba
Christian Durtschi	Stefan Schori	Andreas Schorer	Jonas Wächli		Switzerland
Dustin Eckstrand	Scott Cruickshank	Shaun Planaden	Wade Thurber		Red Deer, Alberta
Niklas Edin	Oskar Eriksson	Kristian Lindström	Christoffer Sundgren		Karlstad, Sweden
Greg Eigner	Benjamin Levy	Marcus Gleaton	Bret Jackson		Fort Wayne, Indiana
John Epping	Travis Fanset	Patrick Janssen	Tim March		(Ontario) Toronto
Martin Ferland	Philippe Lemay	Mathieu Beaufort	Erik Lachance		Trois-Rivières, Quebec
Pat Ferris	Andrew Fairfull	Craig Fairfull	Robert Larmer		Grimsby, Ontario
Dave Fischer	Greg Park	Chris Lovell	Brian Robinson	Larry DeBrouwer	Oshawa, Ontario
Andrew Forrest	Dave Marchant	Chris Chute	Kris Davis		Vancouver, British Columbia
Michael Fournier	Francois Gionest	Yannick Martel	Jean-François Charest		(Quebec) Montreal
Joe Frans	Craig Van Ymeren	Bowie Abbis-Mills	Jeff Gorda		Guelph, Ontario
Mario Freiberger	Sven Iten	Reto Seiler	Paddy Käser		Zug, Switzerland
Chris Gardner	Mike McLean	Terry Scharf	Steve Forrest		(Ontario) Ottawa
Sean Geall	Andrew Bilesky	Steve Kopf	Mark Olson		New Westminster, British Columbia
Dean Gemmell	Bill Stopera	Calvin Weber	Martin Sather		(New York (state)) New York City
Chris Glibota	Matt Mann	Kyle Sherlock	Mark Dugas		Sault Ste. Marie, Ontario
Sean Grassie	Corey Chambers	Kody Janzen	Stuart Shiells		Winnipeg, Manitoba
James Grattan	Jason Roach	Darren Roach	Peter Case		Saint John, New Brunswick
Brent Gray	Tom Worth	Brian Mathews	Matt Hardman		(Ontario) Toronto
Ritvars Gulbis	Normunds Šaršūns	Aivars Avotiņš	Artūrs Gerhards	Roberts Krusts	Riga, Latvia
Brad Gushue	Mark Nichols	Brett Gallant	Geoff Walker		Newfoundland and Labrador
MacAllan Guy	Benj Guzman	Nicholas Connolly	Jeremy Dinsel		(Washington (state)) Seattle
Stefan Häsler	Christian Bangerter	Christian Roth	Patrick Ryf	Chahan Karnusian	Switzerland
Mark Haluptzok	Josh Bahr	Aaron Wald	Jon Chandler		Bemidji, Minnesota
Glen Hansen	Doug McLennan	Brad Willard	Don Bartlett		Edmonton, Alberta
Curtis Harrish	Brian Kushinski	Tyler Wasieczko	Dan Munro		Calmar, Alberta
Jeff Hartung	Kody Hartung	Tyler Hartung	Claire DeCock		Langenburg, Saskatchewan
Jeremy Harty	Cole Parsons	Joel Berger	Gregg Hamilton		Calgary, Alberta
Marcus Hasselborg	Vincent Stenberg	Fredrik Nyman	Anton Sandstrom		Sweden
Minato Hayamizu	Hayato Matsumura	Rui Satoh	Genya Nishizawa		Karuizawa, Japan
Cory Heggestad	Dylan Tippin	Simon Barrick	Brandon Tippin		Kemble, Ontario
Josh Heidt	Brock Montgomery	Matt Lang	Dustin Kidby		Kerrobert, Saskatchewan
Yves Hess	Christian Haller	Rainer Kobler	Fabian Schmid		Switzerland
Lloyd Hill	Scott Egger	Warren Hall	Brian McPherson		Calgary, Alberta
Scott Hodgson	Jodie Hodgson	Mike Reed	Tyler Butzke		Caledon, Ontario
Miloš Hoferka	Michal Zdenka	Vit Soucek	Jakub Splavec	Martin Štěpánek	Prague, Czech Republic
Mark Homan	Ryan McCrady	Paul Winford	Ron Hrycak		(Ontario) Ottawa
Rob Houston	Jeff Clark	Spencer Townley	Rob Steele		Ontario
Glenn Howard	Richard Hart	Jon Mead	Craig Savill		Penetanguishene, Ontario
Rayad Husain	Owen Duhaime	Kevin Hawkshaw	Jess Bechard		Dysart et al, Ontario
Mike Hutchings	Brian McPherson	Steve Hutchings	Derek Skarban		Morinville, Alberta
Ryan Hyde	Kyle Einarson	Farrol Asham	Ken Keeler		Portage la Prairie, Manitoba
Bill Irwin	Kevin Daniel	Don Campbell	Brian Forde		Barrie, Ontario
Steve Irwinsmi	Joey Witherspoon	Travis Taylor	Travis Saban		Brandon, Manitoba
Brad Jacobs	Ryan Fry	E. J. Harnden	Ryan Harnden		Sault Ste. Marie, Ontario
Mike Jakubo	Jordan Chandler	Sandy MacEwan	Lee Toner		Sudbury, Ontario
Dean Joanisse	Paul Cseke	Jay Wakefield	John Cullen		New Westminster, British Columbia
Mark Johnson	Kurt Balderston	Rob Bucholz	Del Shaughnessy		Edmonton, Alberta
Josh Johnston	Wes Johnson	Matt Lowe	Ryan Parker		(Ontario) Toronto
Wes Jonasson	Ray Baker	Justin Reischek	Sheldon Oshanyk	Keith Doherty	Dauphin, Manitoba
Andy Kapp	Daniel Herberg	Markus Messenzehl	Holger Höhne		Füssen, Germany
Aku Kauste	Pauli Jäämies	Leo Makela	Janne Pitko	Kasper Hakunti	Hyvinkää, Finland
Mark Kean	Mathew Camm	David Mathers	Scott Howard		(Ontario) Toronto
Greg Keith	Tyler Pfeiffer	Keith Power	Martin Pederson		Spruce Grove, Alberta
Kim Seung-min	Jeong Yeong-seok	Oh Seung-hoon	Park Se-won		(South Korea) Seoul, Korea
Kim Soo-hyuk	Park Jong-duk	Kim Tae-hwan	Yoo Min-hyeon		(South Korea) Gangwon, Korea
Jamie King	Jeff Erickson	Warren Hassall	Glen Kennedy		Edmonton, Alberta
Darrick Kizlyk	Darryl Sobering	Justin Boshoven	Sean Stevinson		Denver, Colorado
Jamie Koe	Brad Chorostkowski	Mark Whitehead	Robert Borden		Yellowknife, Northwest Territories
Kevin Koe	Marc Kennedy	Brent Laing	Ben Hebert		Calgary, Alberta
Richard Krell	Ben Bevan	Carter Adair	Danny Dow		Ontario
William Kuran	Taylor McIntyre	Riley Smith	Jared Hancox		Winnipeg, Manitoba
J. P. Lachance	Greg Richardson	Frank O'Driscoll	Dan Baird		(Ontario) Ottawa
Axel Larsen	Walter Johnson	Gerry Sundwall	Ken Cox		Guelph, Ontario
Tyler Lautner	Mark Taylor	Jared Latos	Connor Lenton		Calgary, Alberta
Steve Laycock	Kirk Muyres	Colton Flasch	Dallan Muyres		Saskatoon, Saskatchewan
Brian Lewis	Jeff McCrady	Steve Doty	Graham Sinclair		(Ontario) Ottawa
John Lilla	Ryan Berg	Bryan Hanson	Joel Cooper (Note: Cooper is now known as JayCee due to gender transition.)		Blaine, Minnesota
Chris Liscumb	Brian Scott	Aaron Chapman	Colin Darling		Ontario
Mick Lizmore	Nathan Connolly	Parker Konschuh	Carter Lautner		Edmonton, Alberta
Thomas Løvold	Markus Høiberg	Magnus Nedregotten	Alexander Lindstrom		Oslo, Norway
John Luckhurst	Billy MacPhee	Anthony Purcell	Rob Moorealle		Halifax, Nova Scotia
William Lyburn	Richard Daneault	Andrew Irving	Daniel Gagne		Winnipeg, Manitoba
Patric Mabergs	Gustav Eskilsson	Jesper Johansson	Johannes Patz		Sweden
Ian MacAulay	Steve Allen	Rick Allen	Barry Conrad		(Ontario) Ottawa
Brent MacDougall	Stuart MacLean	Kris Granchelli	Chris MacRae		Halifax, Nova Scotia
Paul Madgett	Rob Melhuish	Don Pearson	Al Kirchner		Oakville, Ontario
Scott Manners	Tom Sallows	Ryan Deis	Jordan Steinke	Kendall Warawa	Grande Prairie, Alberta
Dave Manser	Spencer Cartmell	Colin Peterson	Tyler Nast		Lethbridge, Alberta
Bart Witherspoon	Kelly Marnoch	Brandon Jorgensen	Chris Cameron		Carberry, Manitoba
Kevin Marsh	Matt Ryback	Daniel Marsh	Aaron Shutra		Saskatoon, Saskatchewan
Nathan Martin	Seth Vogan	Nick Moffatt	Todd Johnston		Oshawa, Ontario
Sean Murray	Fred Maxie	Rob Corn	Colin Rittgers		Madison, Wisconsin
Ken McArdle	Chase Martyn	Cody Johnston	William Sutton		Vancouver, British Columbia
Andy McCann	Marc LeCocq	Scott Jones	Jamie Brannen		Fredericton, New Brunswick
Curtis McCannell	Bill Thiessen	Robert Van Deynze	Jason Morrow		Pilot Mound, Manitoba
Heath McCormick	Craig Brown	Kroy Nernberger	Sean Beighton	Alex Leichter	Blaine, Minnesota
Brian Lewis (fourth)	Jeff McCrady (skip)	Mike Johansen	Graham Sinclair		(Ontario) Ottawa
Gary McCullough	Tim Meadows	Bruce Fleming	Doug Trivers		Thornhill, Ontario
Scott McDonald	Brett Dekoning	Scott Brandon	Shane Konings		London, Ontario
Mike McEwen	B. J. Neufeld	Matt Wozniak	Denni Neufeld		Winnipeg, Manitoba
Marcelo Mello	Raphael Monticello	Filipe Nunes	Cesar Santos		Porto Alegre, Brazil
Jean-Michel Ménard	Martin Crête	Éric Sylvain	Philippe Ménard		Gatineau, Quebec
Bill Merklinger	Steve Moss				Yellowknife, Northwest Territories
Ethan Meyers	Quinn Evenson	William Pryor			(Minnesota) Minneapolis
Pascal Michaud	Zach Shurtleff	Decebal Michaud	Jamie Waters		Ajax, Ontario
Sven Michel	Florian Meister	Simon Gempeler	Stefan Meienberg		Adelboden, Switzerland
Dustin Montpellier	Nicholas Beaudry	Shane Gordon	Matt Gordon		Sudbury, Ontario
Dennis Moretto	Paul Attard	Mike Nelson	Enzo Difilippo		Oakville, Ontario
Yusuke Morozumi	Tsuyoshi Yamaguchi	Tetsuro Shimizu	Kosuke Morozumi		Karuizawa, Japan
Patrick Morris	Marcus Rozycki	Arkell Farr	Stuart Sankey		(Ontario) Toronto
Bruce Mouat	Logan Gray	Derrick Sloan	Angus Dowell		Edinburgh, Scotland
Richard Muntain	Mike McCaughan	Curtis Atkins	Rodney Legault		Pinawa, Manitoba
David Murdoch	Greg Drummond	Scott Andrews	Michael Goodfellow		Stirling, Scotland
Jamie Murphy	Jordan Pinder	Scott Babin	Tyler Gamble		Halifax, Nova Scotia
Daniel Neuner	Konstantin Kampf	Alexander Kampf	Dominik Greindl	Sebastian Jacoby	Füssen, Germany
Peter Nielsen	Evan Brantter	Kyle Duncan	David MacDonald		Vernon, British Columbia
Sean O'Connor	Vance Elder	Rayn O'Connor	Dan Bubola		Calgary, Alberta
James Pahl	Ted Appelman	Mark Klinck	Roland Robinson		Sherwood Park, Alberta
Daley Peters	Brendan Taylor	Taren Gesell	Greg Melnichuk		Winnipeg, Manitoba
Marc Pfister	Enrico Pfister	Reto Keller	Raphael Märki	Michael Boesiger	Switzerland
Brent Pierce	Jeff Richard	Tyler Orme	David Harper		Kelowna, British Columbia
Christopher Plys	Joe Polo	Jared Zezel	Colin Hufman	Ryan Brunt	Blaine, Minnesota
Darryl Prebble	Dale Matchett	Denis Belanger	Dennis Lemon		Toronto, Ontario
Howard Rajala	Rich Moffatt	Chris Fulton	Paul Madden		Ottawa, Ontario
Scott Ramsay	Mark Taylor	Ross McFadyen	Kyle Werenich		Winnipeg, Manitoba
Tomi Rantamäki	Pekka Peura	Jere Sullanmaa	Jermu Pollanen		Hyvinkää, Finland
Rob Retchless	Punit Sthankiya	Dave Ellis	Rob Ainsley		Toronto, Ontario
Ghyslain Richard	Maxime Elmaleh	William Dion	Miguel Bernard		Quebec City, Quebec
Sebastien Robillard	Tyler Klymchuk	Dylan Somerton	Chris Brezina		Vancouver, British Columbia
Brent Ross	Ryan Werenich	Andrew Clayton	Shawn Kaufman		Harriston, Ontario
Manuel Ruch	Jean-Nicolas Longchamp	Roman Ruch	Michael Devaux		Switzerland
Rob Rumfeldt	Adam Spencer	Brad Kidd	Jake Higgs		Guelph, Ontario
Robert Schlender	Kevin Park	Bert Martin	Josh Burns		Edmonton, Alberta
Tyler Runing	Evan Workin	Cole Jaeger	Jordan Brown		Fargo, North Dakota
Stephen Schneider	Wes Johnson	Shawn Eklund	Brant Amos		Vancouver, British Columbia
Romano Meier (fourth)	Yannick Schwaller (skip)	Patrick Witschonke	Michael Probst		Switzerland
Thomas Scoffin	Aiden Procter	David Aho	Brayden Power		Edmonton, Alberta
Seong Se-hyeon	Oh Eun-su	Kim Chi-goo	Seo Young-seon		(South Korea) Uiseong, Korea
Jamie Sexton	James McKenzie	Hugh Bennett	Rob Nobert		Vernon, British Columbia
Randie Shen	Nicholas Hsu	Brendon Liu	Lin Ting-li		Taipei, Chinese Taipei
Michael Shepherd	Jordan Keon	Curtis Samoy	Michael Keon		Ontario
John Shuster	Tyler George	Matt Hamilton	Trevor Host		Duluth, Minnesota
Steen Sigurdson	Jim Coleman	Ian McMillan	Nick Curtis		Winnipeg, Manitoba
David Šik	Radek Bohac	Tomáš Paul	Milan Polivka		Prague, Czech Republic
Aaron Sluchinski	Justin Sluchinski	Dylan Webster	Eric Richard		Airdrie, Alberta
Kyle Smith	Grant Hardie	Kyle Waddell	Cammy Smith	Duncan Menzies	Perth, Scotland
Jiří Snítil	Lukas Klima	Martin Snítil	Jindřich Kitzberger		Prague, Czech Republic
Aaron Squires	Matt Mapletoft	Spencer Nuttall	Fraser Reid		Kitchener-Waterloo, Ontario
Jon St. Denis	Chris Ciasnocha	Mike Aprile	Shawn Cottrill		Stouffville, Ontario
Stefan Stähli	Andre Neuenschwander	Simon Biedermann	Neal Schwenter		Switzerland
Justin Stanus	Nolan Bradshaw	Justin Twiss	Ryan Duncan	Daryl Evans	Winnipeg, Manitoba
Chad Stevens	Cameron MacKenzie	Scott Saccary	Philip Crowell		Halifax, Nova Scotia
Rasmus Stjerne	Mikkel Krause	Oliver Dupont	Troels Harry	Mikkel Poulsen	Hvidovre, Denmark
Peter Stolt	Brad Caldwell	Erik Ordway	Clayton Orvik		St. Paul, Minnesota
Jeff Stoughton	Rob Fowler	Alex Forrest	Connor Njegovan		Winnipeg, Manitoba
Karsten Sturmay	Tristan Steinke	Brett Winfield	Mac Lenton		Edmonton, Alberta
Tommy Sullivan	Paul Flemming	Travis Colter	Don McDermaid		Halifax, Nova Scotia
Marc Suter	Michael Müller	Daniel Gubler	Michel Harcuba	Mike Laub	Switzerland
Yasumasa Tahida	Yuya Takigahira	Shingo Usui	Kazuki Yoshikawa		Aomori, Japan
Stuart Taylor	Ross Fraser	Bobby Lammie	Gregor Cannon	Alasdair Schreiber	Forfar, Scotland
Alexey Tselousov	Artem Shmakov	Alexey Timofeev	Evgeny Klimov		St. Petersburg, Russia
Wayne Tuck, Jr.	Chad Allen	Connor Duhaime	Chris Jay		Brantford, Ontario
Thomas Ulsrud	Torger Nergård	Christoffer Svae	Håvard Vad Petersson		Oslo, Norway
Mikel Unanue	Inaki Lasuen	Victor Mirete	Avelino Garcia	Iban Arrunategi	San Sebastián, Spain
Thomas Usselman	Michael Roy	Taylor Ardiel	Curtis Der		Calgary, Alberta
Markku Uusipaavalniemi	Jari Laukkanen	Joni Ikonen	Jari Turto		Hyvinkää, Finland
Jaap van Dorp	Carlo Glasbergen	Wouter Gösgens	Joey Bruinsma	Laurens Hoekman	Zoetermeer, Netherlands
Daylan Vavrek	Evan Asmussen	Jason Ginter	Andrew O'Dell		Sexsmith, Alberta
Damien Villard	Blake Sandham	Jordan Moreau	Duane Lindner		Cambridge, Ontario
Joffrey Vincent	Guillaume Vincent	Frederic Buttoudin	Rodolphe Vincent		France
Brock Virtue	Charley Thomas	Brandon Klassen	D. J. Kidby		Calgary, Alberta
Jake Vukich	Brandon Scheel	Alex Fenson	Graem Fenson		Bemidji, Minnesota
Jake Walker	Dayna Deruelle	Andrew McGaugh	Michael McGaugh		Brampton, Ontario
Wade White	Kevin Tym	Dan Holowaychuk	George White		Edmonton, Alberta
Jessi Wilkinson	Morgan van Doesburg	Aaron Luchko	Neal Woloschuk		Edmonton, Alberta
Matt Willerton	Jeremy Hodges	Craig MacAlpine	Chris Evernden		Edmonton, Alberta
Chris Wimmer	Kris Bourgeois	Dave Thompson			Cookstown, Ontario
Sebastian Wunderer	Mathias Genner	Martin Reichel	Markus Forejtek	Philipp Nothegger	Vienna, Austria
Zang Jialiang	Zou Dejia	Ba Dexin	Zou Qiang	Wang Jinbo	Harbin, China
Zhang Zezhong	Feng Shuo	Li Haoran	Li Guangxu	Zhang Zhongbao	Harbin, China

== Women ==
As of September 13, 2014

Skip	Third	Second	Lead	Alternate	Locale
An Jin-hi	Kang Yoo-ri	Kim Eun-bi	Hyoung Bo-ram		(South Korea) Jeonju, Korea
Mary-Anne Arsenault	Christina Black	Jane Snyder	Jennifer Baxter		Halifax, Nova Scotia
Cathy Auld	Julie Reddick	Holly Donaldson	Carly Howard		(Ontario) Toronto
Megan Balsdon	Jessica Corrado	Stephanie Corrado	Laura Hickey		Toronto, Ontario
Brett Barber	Samantha Yachiw	Meaghan Frerichs	Kaitlyn Bowman		Biggar, Saskatchewan
Melanie Barbezat	Carole Howald	Jenny Perret	Daniela Rupp		Biel, Switzerland
Penny Barker	Deanna Doig	Amanda Craigie	Danielle Sicinski		Moose Jaw, Saskatchewan
Shannon Birchard	Jenna Boisvert	Taylor Maida	Katrina Thiessen		Winnipeg, Manitoba
Suzanne Birt	Shelly Bradley	Michelle McQuaid	Susan McInnis		Charlottetown, Prince Edward Island
Theresa Breen	Tanya Hilliard	Jocelyn Adams	Amanda Simpson		Halifax, Nova Scotia
Chantele Broderson	Kate Goodhelpsen	Brenna Bilassy	Madysan Theroux		Lacombe, Alberta
Corryn Brown	Erin Pincott	Samantha Fisher	Sydney Fraser		Kamloops, British Columbia
Erika Brown	Alexandra Carlson	Rebecca Funk	Kendall Behm		Madison, Wisconsin
Joelle Brown	Alyssa Vandepoele	Jolene Rutter	Kelsey Hinds		Winnipeg, Manitoba
Keely Brown	Alison Kotylak	Taylore Theroux	Claire Tully		Edmonton, Alberta
Norma Brown	Katie Crump	Heather Wilson	Tracy Desmet		Cluny, Alberta
Celeste Butler-Rohland	Kalie McKenna	Nicole Butler-Rohland	Nicole Johnston		(Ontario) Ottawa
Chrissy Cadorin	Ginger Coyle	Stephanie Thompson	Lauren Wood		Thornhill, Ontario
Jolene Campbell	Kelly Schafer	Teejay Haichert	Kelsey Dutton		Swift Current, Saskatchewan
Robin Campbell	Deb McCreanor	Meghan Knutson	Laurie Macdonell		La Salle, Manitoba
Chelsea Carey	Laura Crocker	Taylor McDonald	Jen Gates		Edmonton, Alberta
Ainsley Champagne	Karen Klein	Lesle Sokoloski	Jennifer Cawson		Winnipeg, Manitoba
Cory Christensen	Sarah Anderson	Grace Gabower	Jenna Haag	Taylor Anderson, Mackenzie Lank	Blaine, Minnesota
Marie Christianson	Erin Porter	Lauren Wasylkiw	Erica Trickett	Noelle Thomas-Kennell	St. John's, Newfoundland and Labrador
Nadine Chyz	Heather Jensen	Whitney Eckstrand	Heather Rogers		Calgary, Alberta
Jennifer Clark-Rouire	Jolene Rutter	M.J. Robidoux	Megan Brett		Winnipeg, Manitoba
Kelly Cochrane	Adele Campbell	Heather Carr Olmstead	Tammy Holland		Ontario
Marg Cutcliffe	Sara Jane Aarason	Courtney Smith			Halifax, Nova Scotia
Sarah Daniels	Marika Van Osch	Dezaray Hawes	Megan Daniels		Delta, British Columbia
Lisa Davies	Alanna Routledge	Alison Davies	Joëlle St-Hilaire		Dollard-des-Ormeaux, Quebec
Courtney de Winter	Trisha Halchuk	Emily Simpson	Raquel Auciello		Richmond Hill, Ontario
Delia DeJong	Amy Janko	Brittany Zelmer	Janais DeJong		Grande Prairie, Alberta
Kim Dolan	Rebecca Jean MacDonald	Sinead Dolan	Michala Robison	Jackie Reid	Charlottetown, Prince Edward Island
Dong Ziqi	Jiang Simiao	Wang Ziyue	Fu Yiwei	Wang Zixin	Harbin, China
Brenda Doroshuk	Erica Ortt	Brittany Whittemore	Tammy Kaufman		Edmonton, Alberta
Tanilla Doyle	Lindsay Amundsen-Meyer	Logan Conway	Christina Faulkner		Calgary, Alberta
Emily Dwyer	Amanda Colter	Katrina MacKinnon	Laura Kennedy		Halifax, Nova Scotia
Chantelle Eberle	Cindy Ricci	Larisa Murray	Debbie Lozinski		Regina, Saskatchewan
Kerri Einarson	Selena Kaatz	Liz Fyfe	Kristin MacCuish		Winnipeg, Manitoba
Michelle Englot	Candace Chisholm	Ashley Howard	Kristy Johnson		Regina, Saskatchewan
Lisa Farnell	Mallory Buist	Victoria Kyle	Ainsley Galbraith	Jenn Minchin	Ontario
Binia Feltscher	Irene Schori	Franziska Kaufmann	Christine Urech		Flims, Switzerland
Allison Flaxey	Katie Cottrill	Kristen Foster	Morgan Court	Kimberly Tuck	Listowel, Ontario
Shalon Fleming	Ashley Green	Marsha Munro	Michelle Chabot		Regina, Saskatchewan
Karynn Flory	Richelle Baer	Amanda Moizis	Katie Roskewich		Edmonton, Alberta
Suzanne Frick	Carol Jackson	Christine Loube	Bernie Gillett		Ontario
Rachel Fritzler	Ashley Quick	Amy Merkosky	Alyssa Johns		Regina, Saskatchewan
Satsuki Fujisawa	Emi Shimizu	Chiaki Matsumura	Ikue Kitazawa	Hasumi Ishigooka	Nagano, Japan
Yumie Funayama	Kotomi Ishizaki	Mao Ishigaki	Natsuko Ishiyama		Sapporo, Japan
Fabienne Fürbringer	Nora Baumann	Sina Wettstein	Vendy Zgraggen		Uitikon, Switzerland
Tiffany Game	Vanessa Pouliot	Jennifer Van Wieren	Melissa Pierce		Crestwood, Alberta
Marilou Richter (fourth)	Amy Gibson (skip)	Rebecca Turley	Michelle Dunn		Vancouver, British Columbia
Courtney Gilder	Lee Anne Widawski	Erin Leach	Lindsay Collie		Waterloo, Ontario
Heather Graham	Margie Hewitt	Amy Balsdon	Abbie Darnley		Barrie, Ontario
Clancy Grandy	Janet Murphy	Melissa Foster	Nicole Westlund	Stephanie Matheson	Mississauga, Ontario
Lauren Gray	Jennifer Dodds	Vicky Wright	Mhairi Baird		Stirling, Scotland
Diane Gushulak	Grace MacInnes	Lorelle Weiss	Sandra Comadina		New Westminster, British Columbia
Teryn Hamilton	Kalynn Park	Michelle Dykstra	Amber Cheveldave	Kaitlin Stubbs	Calgary, Alberta
Jessica Hanson	Kourtney Fesser	Krista Fesser	Brie Spilchen		Saskatoon, Saskatchewan
Jacqueline Harrison	Susan Froud	Katelyn Wasylkiw	Jordan Ariss		Brantford, Ontario
Janet Harvey	Cherie-Ann Sheppard	Kristin Napier	Carey Kirby		Winnipeg, Manitoba
Jennifer Harvey	Lise Lalonde	Stephanie Barbeau	Kelly Moore		Cornwall, Ontario
Anna Hasselborg	Karin Rudström	Agnes Knochenhauer	Zandra Flyg		Gävle, Sweden
Julie Hastings	Christy Trombley	Stacey Smith	Katrina Collins	Cheryl McPherson	Thornhill, Ontario
Amber Holland	Cathy Overton-Clapham	Sasha Carter	Chelsey Matson		Regina, Saskatchewan
Rachel Homan	Emma Miskew	Joanne Courtney	Lisa Weagle		Ottawa, Ontario
Tracy Horgan	Jenn Horgan	Jenna Enge	Amanda Gates	Courtney Chenier	Sudbury, Ontario
Danielle Inglis	Shannon Harrington	Cassandra de Groot	Kiri Campbell		(Ontario) Ottawa
Nancy Inglis	Laura Strong	Renelle Simons	Carla Anaka	Nadine Howard	Regina, Saskatchewan
Michèle Jäggi	Michelle Gribi	Stéphanie Jäggi	Vera Camponovo	Carine Mattille	Bern, Switzerland
Jeong Yu-jin	Seol Ye-ji	Seol Ye-eun	Kim Cho-hi	Kim Ji-yun	Uijeongbu, South Korea
Lysa Johnson	Sophie Brorson	Jordan Moulton	Steph Sambor		St. Paul, Minnesota
Colleen Jones	Kim Kelly	Mary Sue Radford	Nancy Delahunt		Halifax, Nova Scotia
Jennifer Jones	Kaitlyn Lawes	Jill Officer	Dawn McEwen		Winnipeg, Manitoba
Sherry Just	Alyssa Despins	Jenna Harrison	Michelle Johnson		Saskatoon, Saskatchewan
Nicky Kaufman	Holly Whyte	Deena Benoit	Pam Appelman		Edmonton, Alberta
Shannon Kee	Pam Feldkamp	Margot Flemming	Halyna Tepylo	Kerry Lackie	Waterloo, Ontario
Colleen Kilgallen	Susan Baleja	Janice Blair	Kendra Georges		Winnipeg, Manitoba
Kim Cho-hi	Seol Ye-eun	Seol Ye-ji	Jeong Yu-jun	Kim Ji-yun	(South Korea) Uijeongbu, Korea
Kim Eun-jung	Kim Kyeong-ae	Kim Seon-yeong	Kim Yeong-mi	Kim Min-jung	(South Korea) Uiseong, Korea
Kim Ji-sun	Gim Un-chi	Lee Seul-bee	Um Min-ji		(South Korea) Gyeonggi-do, Korea
Kim Su-ji	Park Jeong-hwa	Woo Su-bin	Kim Hye-in	Kim Ye-hyun	(South Korea) Seoul, Korea
Cathy King	Glenys Bakker	Lesley McEwan	Shannon Nimmo		Edmonton, Alberta
Shannon Kleibrink	Lisa Eyamie	Nikki Smith	Darah Blandford		Calgary, Alberta
Patti Knezevic	Kristen Fewster	Jen Rusnell	Rhonda Camozzi		Prince George, British Columbia
Sonobe Junko	Touri Koana	Misato Yanagisawa	Riko Toyoda		Yamanashi, Japan
Sarah Koltun	Chelsea Duncan	Patty Wallingham	Jenna Duncan	Lindsay Moldowan	Whitehorse, Yukon
Chantal Lalonde	Rachelle Vink	Kaitlyn Knipe	Tess Bobbie		Woodstock, Ontario
Patti Lank	Maureen Stolt	Anna Bauman	Madisson Lank		(New York (state)) Lewiston, New York
Stefanie Lawton	Sherry Anderson	Sherri Singler	Marliese Kasner	Stephanie Schmidt	Saskatoon, Saskatchewan
Lee Ji-young	Oh Su-yeon	Kim Myeong-ju	Kwon Bom	Jang Hye-ri	(South Korea) Uijeongbu, Korea
Imogen Oona Lehmann	Corinna Scholz	Stella Heiß	Nicole Muskatewitz		Füssen, Germany
Kristy Lewis	Jody Maskiewich	Barbara Zbeetnoff	Jenn Howard		Vancouver, British Columbia
Kendra Lilly	Sarah Potts	Oye-Sem Won Briand	Tirzah Keffer		Thunder Bay, Ontario
Katie Lindsay	Andrea Sinclair	Emily Lindsay	Laura Neil		(Ontario) Ottawa
Kelly MacIntosh	Kristen MacDiarmid	Jennifer Crouse	Karlee Jones		Dartmouth, Nova Scotia
Lauren Mann	Amelie Blais	Brittany O'Rourke	Anne-Marie Filteau		Montreal, Quebec
Jodi Marthaller	Tessa Ruetz	Nicole Larson	Valerie Ekelund	Julie Carrier	Lethbridge, Alberta
Chana Martineau	Candace Read	Kara Lindholm	Kandace McClements		Edmonton, Alberta
Kimberly Mastine	Nathalie Audet	Audree Dufresne	Saskia Hollands		Sherbrooke, Quebec
Nancy McConnery	Sara Spafford	MacKenzie Proctor	Julia Williams		Dartmouth, Nova Scotia
Debbie McCormick	Brittany Falk	Emilia Juocys	Stephanie Senneker		Rio, Wisconsin
Kristy McDonald	Kate Cameron	Leslie Wilson-Westcott	Raunora Westcott		Winnipeg, Manitoba
Janet McGhee	Ashley Waye	Denise Donovan	Sheri Greenman		Uxbridge, Ontario
Susan McKnight	Casey Kidd	Michelle Smith	Joanne Curtis		Uxbridge, Ontario
Sara McManus	Jonna McManus	Anna Huhta	Sofia Mabergs		Gävle, Sweden
Breanne Meakin	Lauren Horton	Lynn Kreviazuk	Jessica Armstrong		(Ontario) Ottawa
Joyance Meechai	Carol Strojny	Julie Smith	Katie Rhyme	Kim Rhyme	(New York (state)) Ardsley, New York
Lisa Menard	Jennifer Rolles	Kim Merasty	Sandra Tibble		Dauphin, Manitoba
Sherry Middaugh	Jo-Ann Rizzo	Lee Merklinger	Leigh Armstrong		Coldwater, Ontario
Mayu Minami	Mizuki Kitaguchi	Mayu Natsuizaka	Mari Ikawa		Aomori, Japan
Michelle Montford	Lisa DeRiviere	Sara Van Walleghem	Sarah Neufeld	Courtney Blanchard	Winnipeg, Manitoba
Kristie Moore	Jocelyn Peterman	Sarah Wilkes	Alison Kotylak		Edmonton, Alberta
Erin Morrissey	Karen Sagle	Chantal Allan	Jen Ahde		(Ontario) Ottawa
Katie Morrissey	Michelle Kryzalka	Suzanne Marcoux	Shauna Nordstrom		Edmonton, Alberta
Mari Motohashi	Chinami Yoshida	Yumi Suzuki	Yurika Yoshida		Aomori, Japan
Eve Muirhead	Anna Sloan	Vicki Adams	Sarah Reid		Stirling, Scotland
Heather Nedohin	Amy Nixon	Jessica Mair	Laine Peters	Jocelyn Peterman	Edmonton, Alberta
Deanne Nichol	Dawn Corbeil	Sandra Sharp	Michelle Pashniak		Peace River, Alberta
Jocelyn Nix	Julie McEvoy	Sheena Moore	Shelley Barker	Jill Thomas	Kentville, Nova Scotia
Susan O'Connor	Lawnie MacDonald	Denise Kinghorn	Cori Morris		Calgary, Alberta
Brit O'Neill	Julia Weagle	Trish Scharf	Kim Brown		(Ontario) Ottawa
Kathy O'Rourke	Robyn Green	Meaghan Hughes	Tricia Affleck		Charlottetown, Prince Edward Island
Ayumi Ogasawara	Sayaka Yoshimura	Kaho Onodera	Anna Ohmiya	Yumie Funayama	Sapporo, Japan
Cissi Östlund	Sabina Kraupp	Sara Carlsson	Paulina Stein		Karlstad, Sweden
Alina Pätz	Nadine Lehmann	Marisa Winkelhausen	Nicole Schwägli		Baden, Switzerland
Rebecca Pattison	Hayley Furst	Jody Keim	Heather Hansen		Calgary, Alberta
Trish Paulsen	Kari Kennedy	Jenna Loder	Kari Paulsen		Saskatoon, Saskatchewan
Roxane Perron	Marie-Josee Fortier	Miriam Perron	Sonia Delisle		Trois-Rivières, Quebec
Samantha Peters	Jackie Peters	Julie Frame	Jenn Donovan		(Ontario) Toronto
Chelsey Peterson	Rebecca Gustafson	Brittany Wilhelm	Katie Methot		Saskatchewan
Sarah Picton	Lynne Flegel	Claire Archer	Marit Lee		Ontario
Colleen Pinkney	Wendy Currie	Shelley MacNutt	Susan Creelman		Truro, Nova Scotia
Cassie Potter	Courtney George	Amy Lou Anderson	Theresa Hoffoss		St. Paul, Minnesota
Stephanie Prinse	Kayte Gyles	Laryssa Legan	Amanda Tipper		Chilliwack, British Columbia
Lesley Pyne	Dayna Connelly	Cassie Savage	Michelle Collin		Calgary, Alberta
Sarah Rhyno	Mary Mattatall	Liz Woodworth	Jenn Brine		Halifax, Nova Scotia
Darcy Robertson	Tracey Lavery	Vanessa Foster	Michelle Kruk		Winnipeg, Manitoba
Kelsey Rocque	Keely Brown	Taylore Theroux	Claire Tully		Edmonton, Alberta
Leslie Rogers	Sheri Pickering	Kathleen Dunbar	Jenilee Goertzen		Edmonton, Alberta
Caitlin Romain	Kendall Haymes	Kerilynn Mathers	Cheryl Kreviazuk		Waterloo, Ontario
Courtney Rossing	Rae-Lynn Beattie	Crystal Chabot	Dakota Inkster		Grande Prairie, Alberta
Nina Roth	Jamie Sinclair	Becca Hamilton	Tabitha Peterson		Blaine, Minnesota
Melissa Runing	Katelyn Furst	Cait Flannery	Alyson Deegan		Mankato, Minnesota
Kristy Russell	Michelle Gray	Tina Mazerolle	Allison Singh		Elora, Ontario
Casey Scheidegger	Cary-Anne McTaggart	Jessie Scheidegger	Brittany Tran		Lethbridge, Alberta
Kim Schneider	Tammy Schneider	Michelle McIvor	Shelby Hubick		Kronau, Saskatchewan
Andrea Schöpp	Monika Wagner	Kerstin Ruch	Lisa Ruch		Garmisch-Partenkirchen, Germany
Kelly Scott	Shannon Aleksic	Kristen Recksiedler	Sarah Pyke		Maple Ridge/Kelowna, British Columbia
Mandy Selzer	Erin Selzer	Kristen Mitchell	Sarah Slywka	Megan Selzer	Balgonie, Saskatchewan
Amie Shackleton	Sara Gatchell	Jennifer Spencer	Karyn Issler		St. Mary's, Ontario
Cathy Shaw	Twyla Gilbert	Rosemary Gowman	Katie Neil		Cambridge, Ontario
Kelly Shimizu	Shawna Jensen	Jami McMartin	Ashley Sanderson		Richmond, British Columbia
Jill Shumay	Nancy Martin	Taryn Schachtel	Jinaye Ayrey		Maidstone, Saskatchewan
Anna Sidorova	Margarita Fomina	Alexandra Saitova	Ekaterina Galkina		Moscow, Russia
Maria Prytz (fourth)	Christina Bertrup	Maria Wennerström	Margaretha Sigfridsson (skip)		Skellefteå, Sweden
Erika Sigurdson		Krysten Karwacki	Lindsay Baldock		Morden, Manitoba
Dailene Sivertson	Steph Baier	Jessie Sanderson	Carley St. Blaze		Victoria, British Columbia
Heather Smith	Jill Brothers	Blisse Joyce	Teri Lake		Halifax, Nova Scotia
Aileen Sormunen	Tara Peterson	Vicky Persinger	Monica Walker		Blaine, Minnesota
Barb Spencer	Katie Spencer	Holly Spencer	Sydney Arnal	Allyson Spencer	Winnipeg, Manitoba
Jennifer Spencer	Sara Gatchell	Karyn Issler	Jenn Ellard		Guelph, Ontario
Tiffany Steuber	Erica Ortt	Kristina Hadden	Brittany Whittemore		Edmonton, Alberta
Heather Strong	Amber Holland	Laura Strong	Carla Anaka		St. John's, Newfoundland and Labrador
Valerie Sweeting	Lori Olson-Johns	Dana Ferguson	Rachelle Pidherny		Edmonton, Alberta
Shannon Tatlock	Leanne Richardson	Shelley Thomas	Lynn LeBlanc		Moncton, New Brunswick
Celina Thompson	Liz Garnett	Mary Myketyn-Driscoll	Sarah Sears		Halifax, Nova Scotia
Jill Thurston	Brette Richards	Briane Meilleur	Blaine de Jager	Krysten Karwacki	Winnipeg, Manitoba
Silvana Tirinzoni	Manuela Siegrist	Esther Neuenschwander	Marlene Albrecht		Aarau, Switzerland
Terry Ursel	Wanda Rainka	Darla Hanke	Lisa Davie	Tracy Igonia	Arden, Manitoba
Stephanie Van Huyse	Jasmin Thurston	Suzanne Miller	Laura Arbour		Ontario
Kesa Van Osch	Kalia Van Osch	Trysta Vandale	Brooklyn Leitch		Nanaimo, British Columbia
Rhonda Varnes	Melissa Gannon	Erin Macaulay	Rebecca Wichers-Schreur		(Ontario) Ottawa
Lana Vey	Alexandra Williamson	Natalie Bloomfield	Ashley Williamson		Regina, Saskatchewan
Sarah Wark	Michelle Allen	Simone Brosseau	Rachelle Kallechy		Victoria, British Columbia
Jessie Kaufman (fourth)	Crystal Webster (skip)	Geri-Lynn Ramsay	Rebecca Konschuh		Calgary, Alberta
Barb Willemsen	Pat Taylor	Denise Hoekstra	Debbie Erdos		(Ontario) Ottawa
Jessica Williams	Carly Angers	Brenda Come	Megan Westlund		Thunder Bay, Ontario
Isabella Wranå	Jennie Wåhlin	Elin Lövstrand	Fanny Sjöberg		Sundbyberg, Sweden
Olga Zharkova	Julia Portunova	Galina Arsenkina	Julia Guzieva		Moscow, Russia
