= 2017 British Columbia Scotties Tournament of Hearts =

Canadian provincial women's curling championship

2017 British Columbia Scotties Tournament of Hearts, Presented by Best Western
- Host city: Duncan, British Columbia
- Arena: Duncan Curling Club
- Dates: January 17–22
- Winner: Marla Mallett
- Curling club: Golden Ears WC, Maple Ridge
- Skip: Marla Mallett
- Third: Shannon Aleksic
- Second: Brette Richards
- Lead: Blaine de Jager
- Finalist: Diane Gushulak

The 2017 British Columbia Scotties Tournament of Hearts, the provincial women's curling championship of British Columbia, was held from January 17 to 22 at Duncan Curling Club in Duncan, British Columbia. The winning Marla Mallett team represented British Columbia at the 2017 Scotties Tournament of Hearts in St. Catharines, Ontario.

Walnut Grove's Marla Mallett defeated her former teammate in Diane Gushulak in the final. Gushulak was a member of the Mallett link the last time Mallett won the provincial championship, in 2009. The Mallett team included Shannon Aleksic from Abbotsford and sisters Brette Richards and Blaine de Jager who are originally from Prince George.

The event was considered a "huge success" by the organizing committee, and was the most important event ever to be held at the Duncan Curling Club.

== Teams ==
The teams were listed as follows:

Skip	Third	Second	Lead	Alternate	Club(s)
Diane Gushulak	Grace MacInnes	Jessie Sanderson	Sandra Comadina	Ashley Sanderson	Royal City CC, New Westminster
Julie Herndier	Nadine Wadwell	Brianna Hanni	Chantel Kosmynka		Cloverdale CC, Surrey
Lindsay Hudyma	Holly Donaldson	Stephanie Jackson-Baier	Carley Sandwith		Vancouver CC, Vancouver; Victoria Curling Club, Victoria
Marla Mallett	Shannon Aleksic	Brette Richards	Blaine de Jager		Golden Ears WC, Maple Ridge
Dailene Pewarchuk	Patti Knezevic	Adina Tasaka	Rachelle Kallechy		Victoria Curling Club, Victoria
Karla Thompson	Kristen Recksiedler	Erin Pincott	Trysta Vandale		Kamloops CC, Kamloops
Kesa Van Osch	Kalia Van Osch	Shawna Jensen	Amy Gibson	Marika Van Osch	Nanaimo CC, Nanaimo
Sarah Wark	Kristin Pilote	Stephanie Prinse	Michelle Dunn		Chilliwack CC, Chilliwack

== Round-robin standings ==
Key
Teams to Playoffs
Teams to Tiebreaker

Skip	W	L
Mallett	6	1
Hudyma	5	2
Wark	4	3
Gushluak	4	3
Van Osch	4	3
Pewarchuk	2	5
Thompson	2	5
Herndier	1	6

== Results ==
Round-robin results are as follows:

Draw 1 Tuesday, January 17, 7:00pm
Sheet	Team 1	Team 2	Score
A	Thompson	Hudyma	4-8
B	Wark	Mallett	4-7
C	Pewarchuk	Gushulak	6-7
D	Herndier	Van Osch	2-10

Draw 2 Wednesday, January 18, 11:00am
Sheet	Team 1	Team 2	Score
A	Van Osch	Wark	8-4
B	Pewarchuk	Hudyma	4-6
C	Herndier	Mallett	2-8
D	Gushulak	Thompson	6-5

Draw 3 Wednesday, January 18, 6:30pm
Sheet	Team 1	Team 2	Score
A	Hudyma	Herndier	7-5
B	Mallett	Gushulak	8-5
C	Thompson	Van Osch	12-5
D	Wark	Pewarchuk	10-3

Draw 4 Thursday, January 19, 11:00am
Sheet	Team 1	Team 2	Score
A	Pewarchuk	Mallett	6-8
B	Herndier	Thompson	10-5
C	Gushulak	Wark	5-7
D	Van Osch	Hudyma	4-6

Draw 5 Thursday, January 19, 6:30pm
Sheet	Team 1	Team 2	Score
A	Wark	Thompson	4-8
B	Gushulak	Van Osch	6-4
C	Mallett	Hudyma	10-6
D	Pewarchuk	Herndier	7-6

Draw 6 Friday, January 20, 9:00am
Sheet	Team 1	Team 2	Score
A	Herndier	Gushulak	4-7
B	Hudyma	Wark	4-10
C	Van Osch	Pewarchuk	10-9
D	Thompson	Mallett	5-6

Draw 7 Friday, January 20, 2:00pm
Sheet	Team 1	Team 2	Score
A	Mallett	Van Osch	2-6
B	Thompson	Pewarchuk	7-8
C	Wark	Herndier	8-6
D	Hudyma	Gushulak	7-3

Tiebreaker Friday, January 20, 7:00pm
Teams	1	2	3	4	5	6	7	8	9	10	EE	Total
Diane Gushulak	0	0	1	0	1	0	2	0	3	0	1	8
Kesa Van Osch	0	1	0	1	0	3	0	1	0	1	0	7

== Playoffs ==
Page playoff system
1	Marla Mallett	6
2	Lindsay Hudyma	1
3	Sarah Wark	7
4	Diane Gushulak	8

Semifinal
2	Lindsay Hudyma	4
4	Diane Gushulak	6

Final
1	Marla Mallett	6
4	Diane Gushulak	3

1 vs 2 Saturday, January 21, 2:00 pm
Teams	1	2	3	4	5	6	7	8	9	10	Total
Marla Mallett	1	0	0	0	0	2	2	1	X	X	6
Lindsay Hudyma	0	0	1	0	0	0	0	0	X	X	1

3 vs 4 Saturday, January 21, 7:00 pm
Teams	1	2	3	4	5	6	7	8	9	10	Total
Sarah Wark	2	0	0	1	1	0	1	0	2	0	7
Diane Gushulak	0	2	0	0	0	3	0	2	0	1	8

Semi-final Sunday, January 22, 11:00 am
Teams	1	2	3	4	5	6	7	8	9	10	Total
Lindsay Hudyma	1	0	0	0	0	0	0	2	1	X	4
Diane Gushulak	0	0	0	1	2	1	2	0	0	X	6

Final Sunday, January 22, 4:00 pm
Teams	1	2	3	4	5	6	7	8	9	10	Total
Marla Mallett	0	0	1	0	0	2	0	0	2	1	6
Diane Gushulak	0	0	0	2	0	0	1	0	0	0	3

2017 British Columbia Scotties Tournament of Hearts

Marla Mallett
4th British Columbia Provincial Championship title
