= 2016 British Columbia Scotties Tournament of Hearts =

Curling tournament held in British Columbia

- Host city: Coquitlam, British Columbia
- Arena: Coquitlam Curling Club
- Dates: January 19–24
- Winner: Karla Thompson
- Curling club: Kamloops CC, Kamloops
- Skip: Karla Thompson
- Third: Kristen Recksiedler
- Second: Tacey Lavery
- Lead: Trysta Vandale
- Finalist: Kelly Scott

The 2016 British Columbia Scotties Tournament of Hearts, the provincial women's curling championship of British Columbia, was held from January 19 to 24 at Coquitlam Curling Club in Coquitlam, British Columbia. The winning Karla Thompson team represented British Columbia at the 2016 Scotties Tournament of Hearts in Grande Prairie, Alberta

== Teams ==
The teams were listed as follows:

Skip	Third	Second	Lead	Alternate	Club(s)
Diane Gushulak	Grace MacInnes	Jessie Sanderson	Sandra Comadina		Royal City CC, New Westminster
Lindsay Hudyma	Rebecca Turley	Michelle Dunn	Amy Gibson (skip)		Royal City CC, New Westminster
Patti Knezevic	Kristen Pilote	Jen Rusnell	Rhonda Camozzi		Prince George G&CC, Prince George; Howe Sound CC, Squamish
Amanda Russett	Crista Sanbrooks	Ashley Nordin	Courtney Karwandy	Barbara Zbeetnoff	Kamloops CC, Kamloops
Kelly Scott	Shannon Aleksic	Jenna Loder	Sarah Pyke		Kelowna CC, Kelowna
Karla Thompson	Kristen Recksiedler	Tacey Lavery	Trysta Vandale		Kamloops CC, Kamloops
Kesa Van Osch	Kalia Van Osch	Shawna Jensen	Carley St. Blaze	Marika Van Osch	Nanaimo CC, Nanaimo
Kristy Lewis	Jody Maskiewich	Barbara Zbeetnoff	Jenn Howard		Royal City CC, New Westminster
Sarah Wark	Simone Brosseau	Michelle Allen	Rachelle Kallechy		Victoria CC, Victoria

== Round robin standings ==
Key
Teams to Playoffs
Teams to Tiebreaker

Skip	W	L
Scott	6	1
Thompson	5	2
Gushulak	4	3
Wark	4	3
Van Osch	3	4
Gibson	3	4
Knezevic	2	5
Russett	1	6

== Results ==
Round robin results are as follows:

=== January 19 ===
Draw 1

- Knezevic 5-4 Van Osch
- Scott 6-3 Gushulak
- Wark 9-7 Gibson
- Thompson 8-5 Russett

=== January 20 ===
Draw 2

- Thompson 9-6 Gushulak
- Van Osch 7-5 Gibson
- Scott 8-2 Russett
- Wark 9-6 Knezevic

Draw 3

- Van Osch 5-4 Russett
- Scott 7-3 Wark
- Thompson 9-7 Knezevic
- Gushulak 8-4 Gibson

=== January 21 ===
Draw 4

- Gibson 9-7 Scott
- Russett 9-5 Knezevic
- Gushulak 7-2 Wark
- Thompson 7-4 Van Osch

Draw 5

- Gushulak 7-3 Knezevic
- Thompson 7-6 Wark
- Scott 7-1 Van Osch
- Gibson 9-5 Russett

=== January 22 ===
Draw 6

- Wark 9-3 Russett
- Van Osch 9-3 Gushulak
- Gibson 11-7 Thompson
- Scott 8-6 Knezevic

Draw 7

- Scott 8-7 Thompson
- Knezevic 9-4 Gibson
- Gushulak 6-5 Russett
- Wark 10-4 Van Osch

== Playoffs ==
Page playoff system
1	Kelly Scott	10
2	Karla Thompson	11
3	Diane Gushulak	10
4	Sarah Wark	6

Semifinal
1	Kelly Scott	9
3	Diane Gushulak	8

Final
2	Karla Thompson	11
1	Kelly Scott	3

=== 1 vs 2 ===
Saturday, January 23, 2:00 pm

Team	1	2	3	4	5	6	7	8	9	10	Final
Kelly Scott	4	2	1	0	0	0	2	0	1	0	10
Karla Thompson	0	0	0	3	1	2	0	3	0	2	11

=== 3 vs 4 ===
Sunday, January 23, 10:30 pm

Team	1	2	3	4	5	6	7	8	9	10	11	Final
Diane Gushulak	0	1	0	2	0	3	0	1	0	1	2	10
Sarah Wark	2	0	3	0	1	0	0	0	2	0	0	8

=== Semifinal ===
Sunday, January 24, 2:00 pm

Team	1	2	3	4	5	6	7	8	9	10	11	Final
Kelly Scott	1	0	1	1	0	2	0	2	1	0	1	9
Diane Gushulak	0	2	0	0	1	0	3	0	0	2	0	8

=== Final ===
Sunday, January 24, 7:00 pm

Team	1	2	3	4	5	6	7	8	9	10	Final
Karla Thompson	2	0	2	2	0	4	0	1	X	X	11
Kelly Scott	0	1	0	0	1	0	1	0	X	X	3

2016 British Columbia Scotties Tournament of Hearts

Karla Thompson
2nd British Columbia Provincial Championship title
