= 2014 British Columbia Scotties Tournament of Hearts =

- Host city: Prince George, British Columbia
- Arena: Prince George Golf & Curling Club
- Dates: January 6–12
- Winner: Kesa Van Osch
- Curling club: Victoria Curling Club, Victoria
- Skip: Kesa Van Osch
- Third: Stephanie Baier
- Second: Jessie Sanderson
- Lead: Carley Sandwith
- Finalist: Kelly Scott

The 2014 British Columbia Scotties Tournament of Hearts, the provincial women's curling championship for British Columbia, was held January 6 to 12 at the Prince George Golf & Curling Club in Prince George. The winning team represented the province at the 2014 Scotties Tournament of Hearts in Montreal.

== Teams ==
Skip	Third	Second	Lead	Club(s)
Amy Gibson	Rebecca Turley	Carman Cheng	Michelle Dunn	Vancouver Curling Club, Vancouver
Shawna Jensen	Merit Thorson	Jade Shultis	Tatianna Simicic	Victoria Curling Club, Victoria
Tracey Jones	Falon Burkitt	Kay Thompson	Melinda Kotsch	Prince George Curling Club, Prince George
Patti Knezevic	Jen Rusnell	Kristen Fewster	Rhonda Camozzi	Prince George Curling Club, Prince George
Allison MacInnes	Grace MacInnes	Diane Gushalak	Amanda Tipper	Abbotsford Curling Club, Abbotsford
Marla Mallett	Kelly Shimizu	Adina Tasaka	Shannon Ward	Cloverdale Curling Club, Cloverdale
Kelly Scott	Jeanna Schraeder	Sasha Carter	Sarah Wazney	Kelowna Curling Club, Kelowna
Karla Thompson	Kristen Recksiedler	Brooklyn Leitch	Michelle Ramsay	Kamloops Curling Club, Kamloops
Kesa Van Osch	Stephanie Baier	Jessie Sanderson	Carley Sandwith	Victoria Curling Club, Victoria
Sarah Wark	Michelle Allen	Simone Brosseau	Rachelle Kallechy	Victoria Curling Club, Victoria

== Round robin standings ==
Final Round Robin Standings

Skip (Club)	W	L
Kesa Van Osch (Victoria)	8	1
Kelly Scott (Kelowna)	7	2
Patti Knezevic (Prince George)	5	4
Allison MacInnes (Abbotsford)	4	5
Tracey Jones (Prince George)	4	5
Marla Mallett (Cloverdale)	4	5
Sarah Wark (Victoria)	4	5
Karla Thompson (Kamloops)	4	5
Amy Gibson (Vancouver)	3	6
Shawna Jensen (Victoria)	2	7

== Round robin results ==
=== Draw 1 ===
Monday, January 6, 11:00 am

Sheet A	1	2	3	4	5	6	7	8	9	10	Final
Allison MacInnes	0	0	0	0	0	1	1	0	2	2	6
Sarah Wark	0	0	1	1	0	0	0	2	0	0	4

Sheet B	1	2	3	4	5	6	7	8	9	10	Final
Karla Thompson	0	1	0	0	3	0	0	2	0	2	8
Marla Mallett	0	0	0	2	0	0	1	0	3	0	6

Sheet C	1	2	3	4	5	6	7	8	9	10	Final
Shawna Jensen	0	1	0	1	0	1	0	1	0	X	4
Patti Knezevic	1	0	2	0	3	0	1	0	2	X	9

Sheet D	1	2	3	4	5	6	7	8	9	10	Final
Kelly Scott	0	1	1	1	1	0	0	3	X	X	7
Tracey Jones	0	0	0	0	0	2	0	0	X	X	2

Sheet E	1	2	3	4	5	6	7	8	9	10	Final
Kesa Van Osch	1	0	0	0	1	0	0	2	1	1	6
Amy Gibson	0	1	1	1	0	1	1	0	0	0	5

=== Draw 2 ===
Monday, January 6, 6:30 pm

Sheet A	1	2	3	4	5	6	7	8	9	10	Final
Kesa Van Osch	1	2	0	2	0	2	3	0	4	X	14
Shawna Jensen	0	0	2	0	2	0	0	3	0	X	7

Sheet B	1	2	3	4	5	6	7	8	9	10	Final
Allison MacInnes	0	1	1	0	0	2	0	0	0	X	4
Kelly Scott	0	0	0	2	1	0	0	2	2	X	7

Sheet C	1	2	3	4	5	6	7	8	9	10	Final
Amy Gibson	0	0	0	0	2	0	0	2	2	X	6
Sarah Wark	0	0	0	0	0	1	0	0	0	X	1

Sheet D	1	2	3	4	5	6	7	8	9	10	Final
Karla Thompson	0	0	2	1	0	0	1	0	3	2	9
Patti Knezevic	1	0	0	0	1	1	0	3	0	0	6

Sheet E	1	2	3	4	5	6	7	8	9	10	Final
Tracey Jones	1	0	2	2	0	0	0	0	X	X	5
Marla Mallett	0	4	0	0	2	0	3	2	X	X	11

=== Draw 3 ===
Tuesday, January 7, 11:00 am

Sheet A	1	2	3	4	5	6	7	8	9	10	Final
Amy Gibson	3	0	1	1	0	1	0	0	0	X	6
Patti Knezevic	0	2	0	0	3	0	3	2	1	X	11

Sheet B	1	2	3	4	5	6	7	8	9	10	Final
Tracey Jones	1	1	0	2	0	2	0	2	0	4	12
Shawna Jensen	0	0	3	0	2	0	2	0	0	0	7

Sheet C	1	2	3	4	5	6	7	8	9	10	Final
Kelly Scott	0	2	0	2	0	0	1	0	1	1	7
Marla Mallett	1	0	1	0	0	1	0	1	0	0	4

Sheet D	1	2	3	4	5	6	7	8	9	10	Final
Sarah Wark	1	0	2	2	0	2	0	0	4	X	11
Kesa Van Osch	0	0	0	0	1	0	2	3	0	X	6

Sheet E	1	2	3	4	5	6	7	8	9	10	Final
Karla Thompson	0	1	0	0	1	0	1	1	0	X	4
Allison MacInnes	2	0	2	3	0	1	0	0	1	X	9

=== Draw 4 ===
Tuesday, January 7, 6:30 pm

Sheet A	1	2	3	4	5	6	7	8	9	10	Final
Sarah Wark	0	3	0	3	2	0	0	0	1	X	9
Tracey Jones	1	0	0	0	0	2	1	1	0	X	5

Sheet B	1	2	3	4	5	6	7	8	9	10	11	Final
Amy Gibson	0	1	0	1	0	1	0	0	0	1	0	4
Karla Thompson	0	0	0	0	2	0	0	2	0	0	2	6

Sheet C	1	2	3	4	5	6	7	8	9	10	Final
Kesa Van Osch	0	0	1	0	2	0	0	2	0	2	7
Allison MacInnes	0	0	0	2	0	1	0	0	3	0	6

Sheet D	1	2	3	4	5	6	7	8	9	10	Final
Patti Knezevic	0	0	2	0	1	0	0	2	1	0	6
Kelly Scott	0	1	0	3	0	2	1	0	0	1	8

Sheet E	1	2	3	4	5	6	7	8	9	10	Final
Marla Mallett	1	1	1	0	2	0	0	4	3	X	12
Shawna Jensen	0	0	0	5	0	3	1	0	0	X	9

=== Draw 5 ===
Wednesday, January 8, 11:00 am

Sheet A	1	2	3	4	5	6	7	8	9	10	Final
Shawna Jensen	0	3	2	0	0	0	1	0	0	X	6
Kelly Scott	1	0	0	3	1	3	0	0	2	X	10

Sheet B	1	2	3	4	5	6	7	8	9	10	Final
Marla Mallett	0	2	0	0	0	1	0	1	0	X	4
Kesa Van Osch	1	0	1	1	1	0	1	0	3	X	8

Sheet C	1	2	3	4	5	6	7	8	9	10	Final
Patti Knezevic	2	0	0	2	0	2	0	0	1	0	7
Tracey Jones	0	3	1	0	1	0	1	1	0	1	8

Sheet D	1	2	3	4	5	6	7	8	9	10	Final
Allison MacInnes	0	1	3	0	0	3	0	1	3	X	11
Amy Gibson	0	0	0	1	3	0	1	0	0	X	5

Sheet E	1	2	3	4	5	6	7	8	9	10	11	Final
Sarah Wark	0	2	0	1	0	0	1	1	0	2	1	8
Karla Thompson	5	0	0	0	1	0	0	0	1	0	0	7

=== Draw 6 ===
Wednesday, January 8, 6:30 pm

Sheet A	1	2	3	4	5	6	7	8	9	10	Final
Tracey Jones	1	1	0	2	0	1	0	1	0	0	6
Kesa Van Osch	0	0	1	0	2	0	3	0	0	3	9

Sheet B	1	2	3	4	5	6	7	8	9	10	Final
Kelly Scott	0	1	0	1	0	0	3	0	0	0	5
Amy Gibson	0	0	1	0	1	1	0	1	1	1	6

Sheet C	1	2	3	4	5	6	7	8	9	10	Final
Karla Thompson	2	1	0	0	1	0	4	0	5	X	13
Shawna Jensen	0	0	1	0	0	1	0	2	0	X	4

Sheet D	1	2	3	4	5	6	7	8	9	10	11	Final
Marla Mallett	0	0	0	0	0	1	1	3	0	0	0	5
Sarah Wark	0	0	0	1	2	0	0	0	1	1	1	6

Sheet E	1	2	3	4	5	6	7	8	9	10	Final
Allison MacInnes	3	0	3	0	0	1	0	1	1	0	9
Patti Knezevic	0	2	0	2	2	0	2	0	0	2	10

=== Draw 7 ===
Thursday, January 9, 11:00 am

Sheet A	1	2	3	4	5	6	7	8	9	10	Final
Kelly Scott	0	0	3	0	0	1	2	0	1	X	7
Karla Thompson	0	1	0	0	1	0	0	1	0	X	3

Sheet B	1	2	3	4	5	6	7	8	9	10	Final
Kesa Van Osch	0	2	0	3	0	3	0	1	0	X	9
Patti Knezevic	1	0	1	0	2	0	0	0	2	X	6

Sheet C	1	2	3	4	5	6	7	8	9	10	Final
Marla Mallett	0	0	0	0	0	1	2	3	0	X	6
Amy Gibson	0	0	0	2	1	0	0	0	1	X	4

Sheet D	1	2	3	4	5	6	7	8	9	10	11	Final
Tracey Jones	3	0	1	0	2	0	1	0	1	1	1	10
Allison MacInnes	0	2	0	3	0	3	0	1	0	0	0	9

Sheet E	1	2	3	4	5	6	7	8	9	10	Final
Shawna Jensen	1	3	1	0	0	0	2	0	0	X	7
Sarah Wark	0	0	0	1	2	0	0	1	1	X	5

=== Draw 8 ===
Thursday, January 9, 6:30 pm

Sheet A	1	2	3	4	5	6	7	8	9	10	Final
Patti Knezevic	1	0	2	0	1	3	0	0	0	X	7
Marla Mallett	0	2	0	1	0	0	1	1	1	X	6

Sheet B	1	2	3	4	5	6	7	8	9	10	Final
Shawna Jensen	0	1	0	1	0	0	1	0	X	X	3
Allison MacInnes	2	0	1	0	1	1	0	5	X	X	10

Sheet C	1	2	3	4	5	6	7	8	9	10	Final
Sarah Wark	1	0	0	2	0	0	1	0	0	0	4
Kelly Scott	0	1	0	0	1	1	0	1	0	2	6

Sheet D	1	2	3	4	5	6	7	8	9	10	Final
Kesa Van Osch	0	0	1	0	1	0	1	0	0	1	4
Karla Thompson	1	0	0	1	0	0	0	0	1	0	3

Sheet E	1	2	3	4	5	6	7	8	9	10	Final
Amy Gibson	0	4	0	2	0	1	0	0	2	X	9
Tracey Jones	1	0	1	0	1	0	2	1	0	X	6

=== Draw 9 ===
Friday, January 10, 9:30 am

Sheet A	1	2	3	4	5	6	7	8	9	10	Final
Marla Mallett	0	1	1	0	0	0	2	1	0	1	6
Allison MacInnes	3	0	0	0	1	0	0	0	1	0	5

Sheet B	1	2	3	4	5	6	7	8	9	10	Final
Patti Knezevic	1	0	1	0	1	0	2	0	2	1	8
Sarah Wark	0	2	0	1	0	1	0	2	0	0	6

Sheet C	1	2	3	4	5	6	7	8	9	10	Final
Tracey Jones	0	2	0	0	1	1	3	0	0	1	8
Karla Thompson	2	0	1	1	0	0	0	1	1	0	6

Sheet D	1	2	3	4	5	6	7	8	9	10	Final
Amy Gibson	0	1	1	0	2	0	0	1	0	0	5
Shawna Jensen	0	0	0	1	0	1	1	0	2	1	6

Sheet E	1	2	3	4	5	6	7	8	9	10	Final
Kelly Scott	0	0	0	1	0	1	0	1	0	X	3
Kesa Van Osch	0	0	2	0	1	0	1	0	2	X	6

== Tiebreakers ==
Quarterfinals		Semifinals		To Playoffs
		Sarah Wark	8
Karla Thompson	4	Allison MacInnes	9
Allison MacInnes	5			Allison MacInnes	6
				Tracey Jones	5
		Tracey Jones	5
		Marla Mallett	2

=== Round 1 ===
Friday, January 10, 2:30 pm

Sheet A	1	2	3	4	5	6	7	8	9	10	Final
Karla Thompson	0	2	0	0	0	1	0	0	1	0	4
Allison MacInnes	1	0	0	0	1	0	1	1	0	1	5

=== Round 2 ===
Friday, January 10, 5:30 pm

Sheet A	1	2	3	4	5	6	7	8	9	10	11	Final
Sarah Wark	0	2	0	1	1	0	0	3	0	1	0	8
Allison MacInnes	1	0	2	0	0	0	3	0	2	0	1	9

Sheet B	1	2	3	4	5	6	7	8	9	10	Final
Tracey Jones	0	1	0	2	0	0	0	0	2	X	5
Marla Mallett	0	0	1	0	0	0	0	1	0	X	2

=== Round 3 ===
Friday, January 10, 9:00 pm

Sheet A	1	2	3	4	5	6	7	8	9	10	11	Final
Allison MacInnes	0	0	1	0	1	1	0	1	0	1	1	6
Tracey Jones	1	0	0	2	0	0	0	0	2	0	0	5

== Playoffs ==
Page playoff system
1	Kesa Van Osch	6
2	Kelly Scott	8
3	Patti Knezevic	6
4	Allison MacInnes	12

Semifinal
1	Kesa Van Osch	10
4	Allison MacInnes	2

Final
2	Kelly Scott	4
1	Kesa Van Osch	5

=== 1 vs. 2 ===
Friday, January 10, 7:00 pm

Sheet B	1	2	3	4	5	6	7	8	9	10	Final
Kesa Van Osch	1	0	0	3	0	0	1	0	1	0	6
Kelly Scott	0	1	2	0	2	1	0	1	0	1	8

=== 3 vs. 4 ===
Saturday, January 11, 10:00 am

Sheet A	1	2	3	4	5	6	7	8	9	10	Final
Patti Knezevic	1	0	1	2	0	2	0	0	0	X	6
Allison MacInnes	0	3	0	0	1	0	2	3	3	X	12

=== Semifinal ===
Saturday, January 11, 7:00 pm

Sheet B	1	2	3	4	5	6	7	8	9	10	Final
Kesa Van Osch	0	2	2	3	2	1	0	0	X	X	10
Allison MacInnes	0	0	0	0	0	0	0	2	X	X	2

=== Final ===
Sunday, January 12, 5:00 pm

Sheet B	1	2	3	4	5	6	7	8	9	10	Final
Kelly Scott	2	0	0	1	0	0	1	0	0	0	4
Kesa Van Osch	0	1	0	0	1	0	0	2	0	1	5

2014 British Columbia Scotties Tournament of Hearts

Kesa Van Osch
1st British Columbia Provincial Championship title
