= 2015 British Columbia Scotties Tournament of Hearts =

- Host city: Maple Ridge, British Columbia
- Arena: Golden Ears Winter Club
- Dates: January 21–25
- Winner: Patti Knezevic
- Curling club: Prince George CC, Prince George; Howe Sound CC, Squamish
- Skip: Patti Knezevic
- Third: Kristen Fewster
- Second: Jen Rusnell
- Lead: Rhonda Camozzi
- Finalist: Sarah Wark

The 2015 British Columbia Scotties Tournament of Hearts, the provincial women's curling championship of British Columbia, was held from January 21 to 25 at Golden Ears Winter Club in Maple Ridge, British Columbia. The winning team represented British Columbia at the 2015 Scotties Tournament of Hearts in Moose Jaw, Saskatchewan

== Teams ==
The teams were listed as follows:

Skip	Third	Second	Lead	Alternate	Club(s)
Diane Gushulak	Grace MacInnes	Lorelle Weiss	Sandra Comadina		Vancouver CC, Vancouver
Patti Knezevic	Kristen Fewster	Jen Rusnell	Rhonda Camozzi		Prince George CC, Prince George; Howe Sound CC, Squamish
Kristy Lewis	Jody Maskiewich	Barbara Zbeetnoff	Jenn Howard		Royal City CC, New Westminster
Amanda Russett	Crista Sanbrooks	Ashley Nordin	Courtney Karwandy		Kamloops CC, Kamloops
Kelly Scott	Shannon Aleksic	Karla Thompson	Sarah Pyke	Kristen Recksiedler	Golden Ears CC, Maple Ridge; Kelowna CC, Kelowna
Dailene Sivertson	Stephanie Jackson Baier	Jessie Sanderson	Carley St. Blaze		Victoria CC, Victoria; Royal City CC, New Westminster
Kesa Van Osch	Kalia Van Osch	Trysta Vandale	Kelsey Steiger		Nanaimo CC, Nanaimo
Sarah Wark	Simone Brosseau	Michelle Allen	Rachelle Kallechy		Victoria CC, Victoria; Juan de Fuca CC, Victoria

== Knockout Draw Brackets ==
=== A event ===
First Knockout		Semifinals		A Qualifier
Dailene Sivertson	3
Kristy Lewis	5	Kristy Lewis	5
Sarah Wark	5	Sarah Wark	7
Amanda Russett	3			Sarah Wark	4
Kelly Scott	5			Patti Knezevic	7
Kesa Van Osch	4	Kelly Scott	3
Diane Gushulak	3	Patti Knezevic	8
Patti Knezevic	8

=== B event ===
Second Knockout
Dailene Sivertson	9
Amanda Russett	4
Kesa Van Osch	10
Diane Gushulak	5

Quarterfinals
Dailene Sivertson	8
Kelly Scott	11
Kesa Van Osch	4
Kristy Lewis	9

Semifinals
Kelly Scott	10
Kristy Lewis	9

B Qualifier
Kelly Scott	4
Sarah Wark	7

=== C event ===
Third Knockout		C Qualifier 1
Amanda Russett	6
Kesa Van Osch	11	Kesa Van Osch	7
		Kelly Scott	9

Third Knockout		C Qualifier 2
Diane Gushulak	7
Dailene Sivertson	6	Diane Gushulak	6
		Kristy Lewis	8

== Knockout results ==
=== Draw 1 ===
Wednesday, January 21, 6:30 pm

Sheet A	1	2	3	4	5	6	7	8	9	10	Final
Sarah Wark	0	0	0	2	0	1	0	1	0	1	5
Amanda Russett	0	0	0	0	1	0	1	0	1	0	3

Sheet B	1	2	3	4	5	6	7	8	9	10	Final
Kelly Scott	1	0	2	0	0	0	1	0	0	1	5
Kesa Van Osch	0	1	0	0	0	2	0	1	0	0	4

Sheet C	1	2	3	4	5	6	7	8	9	10	Final
Dailene Sivertson	0	0	1	0	0	1	0	0	1	X	3
Kristy Lewis	1	0	0	2	0	0	1	1	0	X	5

Sheet D	1	2	3	4	5	6	7	8	9	10	Final
Diane Gushulak	0	0	0	0	0	1	0	2	0	X	3
Patti Knezevic	0	0	0	1	1	0	5	0	1	X	8

=== Draw 2 ===
Thursday, January 22, 11:00 am

Sheet A	1	2	3	4	5	6	7	8	9	10	Final
Diane Gushulak	0	0	0	2	0	1	0	2	0	X	5
Kesa Van Osch	0	2	4	0	1	0	2	0	1	X	10

Sheet B	1	2	3	4	5	6	7	8	9	10	Final
Amanda Russett	1	0	1	0	0	0	2	0	0	X	4
Dailene Sivertson	0	2	0	2	1	1	0	2	1	X	9

Sheet C	1	2	3	4	5	6	7	8	9	10	Final
Patti Knezevic	1	0	0	1	1	0	3	1	1	X	8
Kelly Scott	0	1	1	0	0	1	0	0	0	X	3

Sheet D	1	2	3	4	5	6	7	8	9	10	Final
Kristy Lewis	0	1	0	1	0	0	1	0	2	0	5
Sarah Wark	0	0	1	0	2	0	0	1	0	3	7

=== Draw 3 ===
Thursday, January 22, 6:30 pm

Sheet A	1	2	3	4	5	6	7	8	9	10	Final
Dailene Sivertson	0	2	0	0	5	0	1	0	0	X	8
Kelly Scott	1	0	1	0	0	2	0	3	4	X	11

Sheet C	1	2	3	4	5	6	7	8	9	10	Final
Kesa Van Osch	0	0	1	0	1	1	0	1	0	X	4
Kristy Lewis	2	1	0	2	0	0	1	0	3	X	9

=== Draw 4 ===
Friday, January 23, 11:00 am

Sheet B	1	2	3	4	5	6	7	8	9	10	Final
Sarah Wark	0	0	0	0	0	0	2	1	1	0	4
Patti Knezevic	0	3	0	1	0	1	0	0	0	2	7

Sheet D	1	2	3	4	5	6	7	8	9	10	Final
Kristy Lewis	0	1	0	0	0	1	3	0	4	0	9
Kelly Scott	1	0	0	4	1	0	0	1	0	3	10

=== Draw 5 ===
Friday, January 23, 6:30 pm

Sheet A	1	2	3	4	5	6	7	8	9	10	Final
Kelly Scott	0	2	0	0	1	0	0	1	0	X	4
Sarah Wark	1	0	0	1	0	2	1	0	2	X	7

Sheet C	1	2	3	4	5	6	7	8	9	10	Final
Amanda Russett	0	1	0	2	0	0	1	2	0	X	6
Kesa Van Osch	2	0	3	0	4	1	0	0	1	X	11

Sheet D	1	2	3	4	5	6	7	8	9	10	Final
Diane Gushulak	1	0	0	0	2	0	0	1	3	0	7
Dailene Sivertson	0	1	1	1	0	0	1	0	0	2	6

=== Draw 6 ===
Saturday, January 24, 11:00 am

Sheet A	1	2	3	4	5	6	7	8	9	10	Final
Kesa Van Osch	2	0	2	0	0	2	0	1	0	0	7
Kelly Scott	0	2	0	3	0	0	3	0	0	1	9

Sheet B	1	2	3	4	5	6	7	8	9	10	Final
Diane Gushulak	1	0	1	0	0	2	0	2	0	0	6
Kristy Lewis	0	2	0	3	0	0	2	0	0	1	8

== Playoffs ==
Page playoff system
A	Patti Knezevic	8
B	Sarah Wark	3
C1	Kelly Scott	9
C2	Kristy Lewis	1

Semifinal
B	Sarah Wark	7
C1	Kelly Scott	6

Final
A	Patti Knezevic	5
B	Sarah Wark	3

=== A vs. B ===
Saturday, January 24, 7:00 pm

Team	1	2	3	4	5	6	7	8	9	10	Final
Patti Knezevic	0	0	0	5	0	1	2	0	X	X	8
Sarah Wark	0	0	0	0	2	0	0	1	X	X	3

=== C1 vs. C2 ===
Saturday, January 24, 7:00 pm

Team	1	2	3	4	5	6	7	8	9	10	Final
Kelly Scott	0	1	1	1	3	2	0	1	X	X	9
Kristy Lewis	0	0	0	0	0	0	1	0	X	X	1

=== Semifinal ===
Sunday, January 25, 8:30 am

Team	1	2	3	4	5	6	7	8	9	10	Final
Sarah Wark	0	0	0	0	3	0	2	1	0	1	7
Kelly Scott	0	1	1	2	0	2	0	0	0	0	6

=== Final ===
Sunday, January 25, 1:00 pm

Team	1	2	3	4	5	6	7	8	9	10	11	Final
Patti Knezevic	0	1	0	0	1	0	0	1	0	0	2	5
Sarah Wark	0	0	1	0	0	1	0	0	0	1	0	3

2015 British Columbia Scotties Tournament of Hearts

Patti Knezevic
1st British Columbia Provincial Championship title
