= 2007 British Columbia Scotties Tournament of Hearts =

- Host city: Kamloops, British Columbia
- Arena: Kamloops Curling Club
- Dates: January 24–28
- Winner: Team Law
- Curling club: Royal City CC, New Westminster
- Skip: Kelley Law
- Third: Georgina Wheatcroft
- Second: Shannon Aleksic
- Lead: Darah Provencal
- Finalist: Patti Knezevic

The 2007 British Columbia Scotties Tournament of Hearts, the provincial women's curling championship for British Columbia, was held January 24 to 28 at the Kamloops Curling Club in Kamloops, British Columbia. The winning Kelley Law rink represented British Columbia at the 2007 Scotties Tournament of Hearts in Lethbridge, Alberta, finishing with a 5-6 record in round robin play.

Having won the 2006 Scott Tournament of Hearts, Team Kelly Scott earned an automatic berth to the national championship as Team Canada. This meant British Columbia qualified two teams for the Scotties.

== Teams ==
The teams are listed as follows:

Skip	Third	Second	Lead	Club(s)
Ashleigh Clark	Marilou Richter	Adina Tsaka	Kristen Fox	Richmond CC, Richmond
Sandra Jenkins	Penny Shantz	Brittany Rouck	Sherry Heath	Salmon Arm CC, Salmon Arm
Patti Knezevic	Tracey Jones	Kay Thompson	Melinda Kotsch	Prince George G&CC, Prince George
Kelley Law	Georgina Wheatcroft	Shannon Aleksic	Darah Provencal	Royal City CC, New Westminster
Allison MacInnes	Karla Sparks	Kristen Windsor	Lanette Nordick	Kamloops CC, Kamloops
Marla Mallett	Grace MacInnes	Christen Crossley	Jacalyn Brown	Royal City CC, New Westminster
Pat Sanders	Cheryl Noble	Michelle Allen	Roz Craig	Victoria CC, Victoria
Jill Winters	Allison Hurley	Loreen Amonson	Lisa Nevakshonoff	Nelson CC, Nelson

== Round robin standings ==
Final Round Robin Standings

Key
Teams to Playoffs
Teams to Tiebreakers

Skip	W	L	W–L	PF	PA	EW	EL	BE	SE
Kelley Law	6	1	–	51	42	28	30	12	3
Patti Knezevic	5	2	–	49	41	31	28	6	7
Pat Sanders	4	3	2–0	45	46	34	29	7	10
Ashleigh Clark	4	3	1–1	49	41	32	30	5	10
Allison MacInnes	4	3	0–2	51	47	32	32	6	9
Jill Winters	2	5	1–0	43	50	30	31	7	6
Marla Mallett	2	5	0–1	37	49	28	33	7	7
Sandra Jenkins	1	6	–	45	53	29	31	10	8

== Round robin results ==
All draw times listed in Pacific Time (UTC−08:00).

=== Draw 1 ===
Wednesday, January 24, 12:30 pm

Sheet A	1	2	3	4	5	6	7	8	9	10	Final
Allison MacInnes	0	0	2	0	0	3	0	0	1	2	8
Kelley Law 🔨	0	1	0	1	1	0	2	1	0	0	6

Sheet B	1	2	3	4	5	6	7	8	9	10	Final
Pat Sanders 🔨	0	0	1	0	1	0	1	1	0	0	4
Patti Knezevic	0	0	0	2	0	1	0	0	2	2	7

Sheet C	1	2	3	4	5	6	7	8	9	10	Final
Jill Winters 🔨	0	1	0	1	1	0	1	0	1	3	8
Marla Mallett	1	0	1	0	0	0	0	2	0	0	4

Sheet D	1	2	3	4	5	6	7	8	9	10	Final
Ashleigh Clark 🔨	0	2	2	0	0	1	2	2	0	X	9
Sandra Jenkins	0	0	0	2	2	0	0	0	2	X	6

=== Draw 2 ===
Wednesday, January 24, 7:30 pm

Sheet A	1	2	3	4	5	6	7	8	9	10	Final
Patti Knezevic 🔨	1	0	1	0	1	0	1	0	X	X	4
Ashleigh Clark	0	2	0	3	0	1	0	3	X	X	9

Sheet B	1	2	3	4	5	6	7	8	9	10	Final
Allison MacInnes 🔨	0	1	1	0	2	0	2	0	2	X	8
Marla Mallett	1	0	0	2	0	1	0	1	0	X	5

Sheet C	1	2	3	4	5	6	7	8	9	10	Final
Pat Sanders 🔨	2	0	0	0	1	2	0	0	2	0	7
Sandra Jenkins	0	0	0	1	0	0	2	1	0	1	5

Sheet D	1	2	3	4	5	6	7	8	9	10	Final
Kelley Law 🔨	0	2	0	2	0	0	0	1	0	2	7
Jill Winters	1	0	2	0	0	1	0	0	2	0	6

=== Draw 3 ===
Thursday, January 25, 12:30 pm

Sheet A	1	2	3	4	5	6	7	8	9	10	Final
Sandra Jenkins 🔨	1	1	0	0	3	0	0	0	2	0	7
Allison MacInnes	0	0	2	2	0	1	0	1	0	2	8

Sheet B	1	2	3	4	5	6	7	8	9	10	Final
Jill Winters 🔨	1	0	2	0	1	1	0	1	0	0	6
Pat Sanders	0	2	0	1	0	0	1	0	3	1	8

Sheet C	1	2	3	4	5	6	7	8	9	10	Final
Ashleigh Clark 🔨	0	2	1	0	0	2	0	2	0	0	7
Kelley Law	0	0	0	2	0	0	2	0	2	3	9

Sheet D	1	2	3	4	5	6	7	8	9	10	Final
Marla Mallett 🔨	0	0	1	0	0	0	1	0	X	X	2
Patti Knezevic	0	2	0	2	1	2	0	2	X	X	9

=== Draw 4 ===
Thursday, January 25, 7:30 pm

Sheet A	1	2	3	4	5	6	7	8	9	10	Final
Pat Sanders 🔨	1	0	1	1	0	3	0	0	1	0	7
Marla Mallett	0	2	0	0	3	0	1	2	0	1	9

Sheet B	1	2	3	4	5	6	7	8	9	10	Final
Kelley Law 🔨	0	1	0	0	3	0	2	0	0	2	8
Sandra Jenkins	0	0	0	1	0	1	0	1	3	0	6

Sheet C	1	2	3	4	5	6	7	8	9	10	Final
Patti Knezevic 🔨	2	0	1	0	2	0	1	0	2	X	8
Jill Winters	0	2	0	2	0	2	0	1	0	X	7

Sheet D	1	2	3	4	5	6	7	8	9	10	11	Final
Allison MacInnes 🔨	1	1	0	2	0	1	0	2	0	0	0	7
Ashleigh Clark	0	0	1	0	1	0	2	0	2	1	1	8

=== Draw 5 ===
Friday, January 26, 12:30 pm

Sheet A	1	2	3	4	5	6	7	8	9	10	Final
Kelley Law 🔨	1	0	1	0	3	0	2	0	0	X	7
Patti Knezevic	0	1	0	2	0	1	0	1	1	X	6

Sheet B	1	2	3	4	5	6	7	8	9	10	Final
Ashleigh Clark 🔨	0	0	0	1	3	0	1	1	1	X	7
Jill Winters	0	1	1	0	0	1	0	0	0	X	3

Sheet C	1	2	3	4	5	6	7	8	9	10	Final
Allison MacInnes 🔨	0	0	3	2	0	1	0	0	0	0	6
Pat Sanders	2	0	0	0	2	0	1	1	1	2	9

Sheet D	1	2	3	4	5	6	7	8	9	10	11	Final
Sandra Jenkins 🔨	1	0	0	2	0	0	1	1	0	0	2	7
Marla Mallett	0	2	0	0	0	1	0	0	1	1	0	5

=== Draw 6 ===
Friday, January 26, 7:30 pm

Sheet A	1	2	3	4	5	6	7	8	9	10	Final
Jill Winters 🔨	1	0	0	3	0	3	0	0	0	1	8
Sandra Jenkins	0	2	0	0	3	0	1	1	0	0	7

Sheet B	1	2	3	4	5	6	7	8	9	10	Final
Patti Knezevic 🔨	2	0	0	0	0	1	0	0	4	0	7
Allison MacInnes	0	1	1	1	0	0	0	1	0	1	5

Sheet C	1	2	3	4	5	6	7	8	9	10	Final
Marla Mallett 🔨	0	1	0	0	2	0	2	0	1	1	7
Ashleigh Clark	0	0	1	1	0	1	0	1	0	0	4

Sheet D	1	2	3	4	5	6	7	8	9	10	Final
Pat Sanders 🔨	0	1	0	0	1	0	1	0	1	0	4
Kelley Law	0	0	2	0	0	2	0	2	0	2	8

=== Draw 7 ===
Saturday, January 27, 9:30 am

Sheet A	1	2	3	4	5	6	7	8	9	10	Final
Ashleigh Clark 🔨	1	0	1	0	2	0	0	1	0	0	5
Pat Sanders	0	1	0	1	0	1	1	0	1	1	6

Sheet B	1	2	3	4	5	6	7	8	9	10	11	Final
Marla Mallett 🔨	0	1	1	0	0	0	1	1	0	1	0	5
Kelley Law	0	0	0	3	0	0	0	0	2	0	1	6

Sheet C	1	2	3	4	5	6	7	8	9	10	11	Final
Sandra Jenkins 🔨	1	1	0	0	2	2	0	1	0	0	0	7
Patti Knezevic	0	0	1	0	0	0	1	0	2	3	1	8

Sheet D	1	2	3	4	5	6	7	8	9	10	Final
Jill Winters 🔨	0	1	0	2	0	1	0	0	1	0	5
Allison MacInnes	0	0	1	0	2	0	2	1	0	3	9

== Tiebreakers ==
Tiebreaker #1		Tiebreaker #2
		Pat Sanders	5
Allison MacInnes	8	Allison MacInnes	6
Ashleigh Clark	2

=== Tiebreaker #1 ===
Saturday, January 27, 2:30 pm

Sheet B	1	2	3	4	5	6	7	8	9	10	Final
Allison MacInnes	0	0	1	0	2	1	1	3	X	X	8
Ashleigh Clark 🔨	1	0	0	1	0	0	0	0	X	X	2

=== Tiebreaker #2 ===
Saturday, January 27, 7:30 pm

Sheet D	1	2	3	4	5	6	7	8	9	10	Final
Pat Sanders 🔨	1	0	1	0	1	1	0	1	0	0	5
Allison MacInnes	0	1	0	2	0	0	1	0	1	1	6

== Playoffs ==
Semifinal			Final
			1	Kelley Law	10
2	Patti Knezevic	8	2	Patti Knezevic	4
3	Allison MacInnes	5

=== Semifinal ===
Sunday, January 28, 9:30 am

Sheet B	1	2	3	4	5	6	7	8	9	10	Final
Patti Knezevic 🔨	2	0	0	2	0	2	0	2	0	X	8
Allison MacInnes	0	1	1	0	1	0	1	0	1	X	5

=== Final ===
Sunday, January 28, 2:30 pm

Sheet C	1	2	3	4	5	6	7	8	9	10	Final
Kelley Law 🔨	0	3	0	0	2	0	2	3	X	X	10
Patti Knezevic	0	0	1	2	0	1	0	0	X	X	4

2007 British Columbia Scotties Tournament of Hearts

Kelley Law
7th British Columbia Provincial Championship title
