= 2013 British Columbia Scotties Tournament of Hearts =

- Host city: Cloverdale, British Columbia
- Arena: Cloverdale Curling Club
- Dates: January 14–20
- Winner: Kelly Scott
- Curling club: Kelowna CC, Kelowna
- Skip: Kelly Scott
- Third: Jeanna Schraeder
- Second: Sasha Carter
- Lead: Sarah Wazney
- Finalist: Patti Knezevic

The 2013 British Columbia Scotties Tournament of Hearts, the women's provincial curling championship for British Columbia, was held from January 14 to 20 at the Cloverdale Curling Club in Cloverdale, British Columbia. The winning team represented British Columbia at the 2013 Scotties Tournament of Hearts in Kingston, Ontario.

== Qualification Process ==
Ten teams qualified for the provincial tournament through several methods. The qualification process is as follows:

Qualification method	Berths	Qualifying team
Defending champion from previous year	1	Kelly Scott
CTRS points leader from November 30, 2011, to December 1, 2012	1	Marla Mallett
Open Qualification Round 1 (Nov. 16–18)	3	Marilou Richter; Patti Knezevic; Roberta Kuhn
Open Qualification Round 2 (Nov. 30 – Dec. 2)	3	Allison MacInnes; Pat Sanders; Simone Groundwater
Open Qualification Round 3 (Dec. 14–16)	2	Kirsten Fox; Lori Olsen

== Teams ==
The teams are listed as follows:

Skip	Third	Second	Lead	Alternate	Locale
Kelly Scott	Jeanna Schraeder	Sasha Carter	Sarah Wazney		Kelowna Curling Club, Kelowna
Marilou Richter	Darah Provencal	Jessie Sanderson	Sandra Comadina		Royal City Curling Club, New Westminster
Patti Knezevic	Kristen Fewster	Jen Rusnell	Rhonda Camozzi	Falon Burkitt	Prince George Golf & Curling Club, Prince George
Roberta Kuhn	Karla Thompson	Michelle Ramsay	Christen Wilson		Vernon Curling Club, Vernon
Marla Mallett	Kelly Shimizu	Shannon Ward	Barb Zbeetnoff	Danielle Callens	Cloverdale Curling Club, Cloverdale
Allison MacInnes	Grace MacInnes	Diane Gushulak	Jacalyn Brown		Abbotsford Curling Club, Abbotsford
Sarah Wark (fourth)	Simone Brosseau (skip)	Kim McLandress	Janelle Erwin	Pat Sanders	Juan de Fuca Curling Club, Colwood
Simone Groundwater	Laura Ball	Mallory Sandhu	Cindy Brady		Williams Lake Curling Club, Williams Lake
Kirsten Fox	Kristen Recksiedler	Trysta Vandale	Dawn Suliak		Royal City Curling Club, New Westminster
Lori Olsen	Rachelle Kallechy	Lindsae Page	Theresa Tourand	Kelsi Jones	Royal City Curling Club, New Westminster

== Round-robin standings ==
Final round-robin standings

Key
Teams to Playoffs
Teams to Tiebreaker

Skip (Club)	W	L	PF	PA	Ends Won	Ends Lost	Blank Ends	Stolen Ends
Kelly Scott (Kelowna)	7	2	69	48	41	31	11	13
Patti Knezevic (Prince George)	7	2	69	54	43	37	6	13
Marla Mallett (Cloverdale)	7	2	66	47	41	32	13	15
Allison MacInnes (Abbotsford)	6	3	69	57	44	39	4	17
Marilou Richter (Royal City)	6	3	64	48	40	33	10	11
Kirsten Fox (Royal City)	5	4	59	58	38	37	8	10
Simone Brosseau (Juan de Fuca)	2	7	54	62	33	38	13	8
Roberta Kuhn (Vernon)	2	7	51	70	34	44	7	10
Lori Olsen (Royal City)	2	7	49	76	29	42	8	5
Simone Groundwater (Williams Lake)	1	8	43	76	29	41	6	6

== Round-robin results ==
All draw times are listed in Pacific Standard Time (UTC-8).

=== Draw 1 ===
Monday, January 14, 11:00 am

Sheet A	1	2	3	4	5	6	7	8	9	10	Final
Marla Mallett	0	0	2	0	2	1	0	1	0	1	7
Marilou Richter	0	1	0	3	0	0	1	0	1	0	6

Sheet B	1	2	3	4	5	6	7	8	9	10	Final
Patti Knezevic	0	2	0	0	2	0	3	0	1	1	9
Lori Olsen	1	0	0	1	0	4	0	2	0	0	8

Sheet C	1	2	3	4	5	6	7	8	9	10	Final
Simone Groundwater	0	1	0	2	2	0	1	1	0	0	7
Kirsten Fox	1	0	2	0	0	2	0	0	2	1	8

Sheet D	1	2	3	4	5	6	7	8	9	10	11	Final
Kelly Scott	2	0	2	0	0	0	1	1	0	2	1	9
Roberta Kuhn	0	1	0	2	1	1	0	0	3	0	0	8

Sheet E	1	2	3	4	5	6	7	8	9	10	Final
Simone Brosseau	0	0	0	0	1	0	1	0	1	0	3
Allison MacInnes	0	0	1	1	0	1	0	1	0	2	6

=== Draw 2 ===
Monday, January 14, 6:30 pm

Sheet A	1	2	3	4	5	6	7	8	9	10	Final
Simone Brosseau	0	1	1	0	1	1	0	5	X	X	9
Simone Groundwater	1	0	0	1	0	0	1	0	X	X	3

Sheet B	1	2	3	4	5	6	7	8	9	10	Final
Marilou Richter	0	0	0	1	0	2	0	0	0	0	3
Kelly Scott	0	0	1	0	2	0	1	1	0	1	6

Sheet C	1	2	3	4	5	6	7	8	9	10	Final
Allison MacInnes	0	2	0	0	1	4	2	0	0	0	9
Marla Mallett	3	0	1	1	0	0	0	1	1	1	8

Sheet D	1	2	3	4	5	6	7	8	9	10	11	Final
Patti Knezevic	0	1	0	2	0	2	0	1	0	0	2	8
Kirsten Fox	0	0	2	0	1	0	1	0	1	1	0	6

Sheet E	1	2	3	4	5	6	7	8	9	10	Final
Roberta Kuhn	0	0	3	0	0	1	2	0	0	X	6
Lori Olsen	0	1	0	0	0	0	0	1	1	X	3

=== Draw 3 ===
Tuesday, January 15, 11:00 am

Sheet A	1	2	3	4	5	6	7	8	9	10	Final
Allison MacInnes	1	0	0	2	0	0	2	0	0	X	5
Kirsten Fox	0	2	1	0	2	1	0	1	1	X	8

Sheet B	1	2	3	4	5	6	7	8	9	10	Final
Roberta Kuhn	0	1	0	2	0	0	0	2	0	X	5
Simone Groundwater	3	0	1	0	0	1	4	0	1	X	10

Sheet C	1	2	3	4	5	6	7	8	9	10	Final
Kelly Scott	0	1	0	2	2	2	0	1	0	X	8
Lori Olsen	1	0	4	0	0	0	1	0	0	X	6

Sheet D	1	2	3	4	5	6	7	8	9	10	Final
Marla Mallett	0	0	1	1	0	0	1	3	0	X	6
Simone Brosseau	2	0	0	0	1	0	0	0	1	X	4

Sheet E	1	2	3	4	5	6	7	8	9	10	Final
Patti Knezevic	0	1	0	0	1	1	0	0	1	0	4
Marilou Richter	1	0	2	1	0	0	1	1	0	1	7

=== Draw 4 ===
Tuesday, January 15, 6:30 pm

Sheet A	1	2	3	4	5	6	7	8	9	10	Final
Marla Mallett	0	0	2	2	2	0	2	1	X	X	9
Roberta Kuhn	1	0	0	0	0	2	0	0	X	X	3

Sheet B	1	2	3	4	5	6	7	8	9	10	Final
Allison MacInnes	0	3	1	0	1	0	1	0	1	0	7
Patti Knezevic	2	0	0	2	0	2	0	1	0	1	8

Sheet C	1	2	3	4	5	6	7	8	9	10	Final
Simone Brosseau	0	0	0	2	0	0	0	0	3	0	5
Marilou Richter	0	0	1	0	2	0	2	0	0	1	6

Sheet D	1	2	3	4	5	6	7	8	9	10	Final
Kirsten Fox	0	0	0	0	0	1	0	X	X	X	1
Kelly Scott	0	2	2	1	3	0	2	X	X	X	10

Sheet E	1	2	3	4	5	6	7	8	9	10	Final
Lori Olsen	0	3	0	0	1	0	2	0	1	X	7
Simone Groundwater	1	0	1	1	0	2	0	0	0	X	5

=== Draw 5 ===
Wednesday, January 16, 11:00 am

Sheet A	1	2	3	4	5	6	7	8	9	10	Final
Simone Groundwater	0	0	0	1	0	1	0	X	X	X	2
Kelly Scott	0	2	2	0	4	0	3	X	X	X	11

Sheet B	1	2	3	4	5	6	7	8	9	10	Final
Lori Olsen	0	0	2	0	0	2	0	3	0	X	7
Simone Brosseau	1	1	0	3	3	0	1	0	1	X	10

Sheet C	1	2	3	4	5	6	7	8	9	10	Final
Kirsten Fox	0	2	2	0	0	1	0	1	0	1	7
Roberta Kuhn	1	0	0	1	2	0	1	0	1	0	6

Sheet D	1	2	3	4	5	6	7	8	9	10	Final
Marilou Richter	0	2	0	1	1	0	2	0	0	0	6
Allison MacInnes	3	0	1	0	0	1	0	2	0	2	9

Sheet E	1	2	3	4	5	6	7	8	9	10	11	Final
Marla Mallett	2	0	1	0	0	2	0	0	0	1	0	6
Patti Knezevic	0	1	0	1	1	0	0	1	2	0	1	7

=== Draw 6 ===
Wednesday, January 16, 6:30 pm

Sheet A	1	2	3	4	5	6	7	8	9	10	11	Final
Roberta Kuhn	2	0	0	2	0	1	0	0	2	0	1	7
Simone Brosseau	0	0	1	0	2	0	0	1	0	3	0	6

Sheet B	1	2	3	4	5	6	7	8	9	10	Final
Kelly Scott	1	0	1	0	1	0	2	0	2	0	7
Allison MacInnes	0	1	0	2	0	3	0	2	0	1	9

Sheet C	1	2	3	4	5	6	7	8	9	10	Final
Patti Knezevic	0	4	0	3	0	1	1	0	2	X	11
Simone Groundwater	1	0	2	0	2	0	0	2	0	X	7

Sheet D	1	2	3	4	5	6	7	8	9	10	Final
Lori Olsen	0	2	0	1	1	0	0	1	0	0	5
Marla Mallett	1	0	2	0	0	1	0	0	3	1	8

Sheet E	1	2	3	4	5	6	7	8	9	10	Final
Marilou Richter	3	0	1	0	1	0	0	1	0	1	7
Kirsten Fox	0	2	0	2	0	1	0	0	1	0	6

=== Draw 7 ===
Thursday, January 17, 11:00 am

Sheet A	1	2	3	4	5	6	7	8	9	10	Final
Kelly Scott	1	0	2	0	2	0	0	0	0	1	6
Patti Knezevic	0	1	0	1	0	0	1	1	0	0	4

Sheet B	1	2	3	4	5	6	7	8	9	10	Final
Simone Brosseau	3	0	0	1	0	0	0	0	1	0	5
Kirsten Fox	0	2	0	0	2	1	1	1	0	1	8

Sheet C	1	2	3	4	5	6	7	8	9	10	Final
Lori Olsen	0	0	2	0	2	3	0	0	0	1	8
Allison MacInnes	1	1	0	2	0	0	1	1	1	0	7

Sheet D	1	2	3	4	5	6	7	8	9	10	Final
Roberta Kuhn	1	0	2	0	1	0	2	0	0	X	6
Marilou Richter	0	2	0	2	0	1	0	3	1	X	9

Sheet E	1	2	3	4	5	6	7	8	9	10	Final
Simone Groundwater	3	1	0	0	1	0	0	0	1	0	6
Marla Mallett	0	0	3	1	0	2	0	0	0	1	7

=== Draw 8 ===
Thursday, January 17, 6:30 pm

Sheet A	1	2	3	4	5	6	7	8	9	10	Final
Kirsten Fox	1	0	2	0	4	0	5	X	X	X	12
Lori Olsen	0	0	0	1	0	2	0	X	X	X	3

Sheet B	1	2	3	4	5	6	7	8	9	10	Final
Simone Groundwater	0	0	1	0	0	0	2	0	X	X	3
Marilou Richter	2	1	0	2	2	1	0	1	X	X	9

Sheet C	1	2	3	4	5	6	7	8	9	10	Final
Marla Mallett	0	0	2	0	0	2	2	0	2	X	8
Kelly Scott	2	0	0	1	1	0	0	0	0	X	4

Sheet D	1	2	3	4	5	6	7	8	9	10	Final
Simone Brosseau	2	0	0	2	0	0	0	X	X	X	4
Patti Knezevic	0	3	0	0	2	2	3	X	X	X	10

Sheet E	1	2	3	4	5	6	7	8	9	10	Final
Allison MacInnes	2	2	0	1	0	1	1	0	0	1	8
Roberta Kuhn	0	0	2	0	1	0	0	2	1	0	6

=== Draw 9 ===
Friday, January 18, 9:30 am

Sheet A	1	2	3	4	5	6	7	8	9	10	Final
Lori Olsen	0	1	0	0	1	0	X	X	X	X	2
Marilou Richter	1	0	4	3	0	3	X	X	X	X	11

Sheet B	1	2	3	4	5	6	7	8	9	10	Final
Kirsten Fox	0	2	0	0	0	0	0	1	0	X	3
Marla Mallett	2	0	0	1	0	1	0	0	3	X	7

Sheet C	1	2	3	4	5	6	7	8	9	10	Final
Roberta Kuhn	0	0	0	1	1	0	1	0	X	X	3
Patti Knezevic	1	1	2	0	0	2	0	2	X	X	8

Sheet D	1	2	3	4	5	6	7	8	9	10	Final
Allison MacInnes	2	3	0	1	1	2	X	X	X	X	9
Simone Groundwater	0	0	0	0	0	0	X	X	X	X	0

Sheet E	1	2	3	4	5	6	7	8	9	10	Final
Kelly Scott	0	1	3	0	3	0	1	0	0	0	8
Simone Brosseau	0	0	0	1	0	2	0	2	1	1	7

== Tiebreaker ==
Friday, January 18

Sheet A	1	2	3	4	5	6	7	8	9	10	Final
Allison MacInnes	2	2	0	2	0	3	0	2	0	X	11
Marilou Richter	0	0	2	0	3	0	1	0	2	X	8

== Playoffs ==
Page playoff system
1	Patti Knezevic	7
2	Kelly Scott	8
3	Marla Mallett	7
4	Allison MacInnes	4

Semifinal
1	Patti Knezevic	8
3	Marla Mallett	7

Final
2	Kelly Scott	9
1	Patti Knezevic	6

=== 1 vs. 2 ===
Friday, January 18, 7:00 pm

Sheet A	1	2	3	4	5	6	7	8	9	10	11	Final
Patti Knezevic	2	0	1	0	0	1	0	0	2	1	0	7
Kelly Scott	0	2	0	2	0	0	1	2	0	0	1	8

=== 3 vs. 4 ===
Saturday, January 19, 10:00 am

Sheet A	1	2	3	4	5	6	7	8	9	10	Final
Marla Mallett	2	0	0	1	1	1	1	1	0	X	7
Allison MacInnes	0	0	1	0	0	0	0	0	3	X	4

=== Semifinal ===
Saturday, January 19, 5:30 pm

Sheet A	1	2	3	4	5	6	7	8	9	10	Final
Patti Knezevic	0	1	0	2	0	3	0	1	0	1	8
Marla Mallett	0	0	2	0	2	0	2	0	1	0	7

=== Final ===
Sunday, January 20, 2:00 pm

Sheet A	1	2	3	4	5	6	7	8	9	10	Final
Kelly Scott	2	0	3	1	0	2	1	0	0	X	9
Patti Knezevic	0	1	0	0	2	0	0	2	1	X	6

== Qualification rounds ==
=== Round 1 ===
The first qualification round for the 2013 British Columbia Scotties took place from November 16 to 18, 2012 at the Vernon Curling Club in Vernon. The qualifier was held in a double knockout format, and qualified three teams for the provincial playdowns.

==== Teams ====
Skip	Third	Second	Lead	Alternate	Locale
Rebecca Turley (fourth)	Amy Gibson (skip)	Carman Cheng	Michelle Dunn		Vancouver Curling Club, Vancouver
Patti Knezevic	Kristen Fewster	Jen Rusnell	Rhonda Camozzi	Falon Burkitt	Prince George Golf & Curling Club, Prince George
Roberta Kuhn	Karla Thompson	Michelle Ramsay	Christen Wilson		Vernon Curling Club, Vernon
Allison MacInnes	Grace MacInnes	Diane Gushulak	Jacalyn Brown		Abbotsford Curling Club, Abbotsford
Lori Olsen	Heather Mockford-Tyre	Christine LeDrew	Karla Crellin		Kamloops Curling Club, Kamloops
Marilou Richter	Darah Provencal	Jessie Sanderson	Sandra Comadina		Royal City Curling Club, New Westminster
Amanda Russett	Crista Nordin	Ashley Nordin	Courtney Karwandy		Kamloops Curling Club, Kamloops
Adina Tasaka	Rachelle Kallechy	Lindsae Page	Kelsi Jones		Royal City Curling Club, New Westminster
Kelly Thompson	Susan Hicks	Lisa Robitaille	Kimberly Hall		Castlegar Curling Club, Castlegar

==== Results ====
First Knockout
Amy Gibson	8
Amanda Russett	6

Quarterfinals
Amy Gibson	5
Allison MacInnes	10
Patti Knezevic	8
Roberta Kuhn	7
Lori Olsen	12
Kelly Thompson	2
Marilou Richter	7
Adina Tasaka	4

Semifinals
Allison MacInnes	7
Patti Knezevic	8
Lori Olsen	5
Marilou Richter	7

A Qualifier
Patti Knezevic	5
Marilou Richter	6

Second Knockout
Amanda Russett	9
Kelly Thompson	6

Quarterfinals
Amy Gibson	5
Roberta Kuhn	2
Adina Tasaka	6
Amanda Russett	2

Semifinals
Amy Gibson	8
Lori Olsen	10
Adina Tasaka	5
Allison MacInnes	7

To B Qualifier
Lori Olsen	L
Allison MacInnes	W

B Qualifier
1	Allison MacInnes	8
2	Patti Knezevic	10

Third Knockout
Kelly Thompson	L
Roberta Kuhn	W

Quarterfinals
Adina Tasaka	4
Roberta Kuhn	7
Amanda Russett	5
Amy Gibson	3

Semifinals
Roberta Kuhn	9
Allison MacInnes	1
Amanda Russett	10
Lori Olsen	6

C Qualifier
Roberta Kuhn	9
Amanda Russett	8

=== Round 2 ===
The second qualification round for the 2013 British Columbia Scotties took place from November 30 to December 2, 2012, at the North Shore Curling Club in North Vancouver, British Columbia. The qualifier was held in a double knockout format, and qualified three teams for the provincial playdowns.

==== Teams ====
Skip	Third	Second	Lead	Alternate	Locale
Kirsten Fox	Kristen Recksiedler	Trysta Vandale	Dawn Suliak		Royal City Curling Club, New Westminster
Rebecca Turley (fourth)	Amy Gibson (skip)	Carman Cheng	Michelle Dunn		Vancouver Curling Club, Vancouver
Simone Groundwater	Laura Ball	Mallory Sandhu	Cindy Brady		Williams Lake Curling Club, Williams Lake
Allison MacInnes	Grace MacInnes	Diane Gushulak	Jacalyn Brown		Abbotsford Curling Club, Abbotsford
Pat Sanders	Sarah Wark	Kim McLandress	Janelle Erwin	Simone Brosseau	Juan de Fuca Curling Club, Victoria
Adina Tasaka	Rachelle Kallechy	Lindsae Page	Kelsi Jones		Royal City Curling Club, New Westminster
Kelly Thompson	Susan Hicks	Lisa Robitaille	Kimberly Hall		Castlegar Curling Club, Castlegar

==== Results ====
First Knockout		Semifinals		A Qualifier
Adina Tasaka	7
Simone Groundwater	12	Simone Groundwater	11
Pat Sanders	12	Pat Sanders	5
Amy Gibson	5			Simone Groundwater	4
Kelly Thompson	6			Allison MacInnes	5
Kirsten Fox	10	Kirsten Fox	1
		Allison MacInnes	9

Second Knockout
Kelly Thompson	8
Amy Gibson	4
Adina Tasaka	6
Kirsten Fox	8

Semifinals
Kelly Thompson	1
Pat Sanders	7
Kirsten Fox	8
Simone Groundwater	4

B Qualifier
Pat Sanders	4
Kirsten Fox	3

Third Knockout
Adina Tasaka	7
Amy Gibson	2

Semifinals
Adina Tasaka	3
Kirsten Fox	9
Kelly Thompson	7
Simone Groundwater	9

C Qualifier
Kirsten Fox	5
Simone Groundwater	6

=== Round 3 ===
The third qualification round for the 2013 British Columbia Scotties took place from December 14 to 16, 2012 at the Prince George Curling Club in Prince George, British Columbia. The qualifier was held in a double knockout format, and qualified two teams for the provincial playdowns.

==== Teams ====
Skip	Third	Second	Lead	Alternate	Locale
Kirsten Fox	Kristen Recksiedler	Trysta Vandale	Dawn Suliak		Royal City Curling Club, New Westminster
Susan Hicks	Brenda Garvey	Kimberly Hall	Margaret Hicks		Castlegar Curling Club, Castlegar
Lori Olsen	Heather Mockford-Tyre	Christine LeDrew	Karla Crellin		Kamloops Curling Club, Kamloops

==== Results ====
Round Robin

		Fox	Hicks	Olsen	Standings
1	Kirsten Fox		1–0	7–4	2–0
2	Susan Hicks	0–1		10–9	1–1
3	Lori Olsen	4–7	9–10		0–2

Playoffs

Fox played Hicks for the first spot in the provincials. Hicks played Olsen for the second spot after losing to Fox.

Qualifier 2			Qualifier 1
			1	Kirsten Fox	8
2	Susan Hicks	5	2	Susan Hicks	1
3	Lori Olsen	8
