= Diane Gushulak =

Canadian curler

- Curler
- Born: Diane McLean; May 27, 1969 (age 57); Edmonton, Alberta, Canada

Team
- Curling club: Vancouver CC, Vancouver
- Skip: Diane Gushulak
- Third: Jessie Sanderson
- Second: Layna Pohlod
- Lead: Kim Dennis
- Alternate: Grace MacInnes

Curling career
- Member Association: Ontario (1989-1995); British Columbia (1996-present)
- Top CTRS ranking: 25th (2016–17)

Diane Gail Gushulak (née McLean; born May 27, 1969) is a Canadian curler from Vancouver, British Columbia. She currently skips her own team out of Vernon.

== Career ==
=== Early career in Ontario ===
Gushulak's early curling career was spent in Ontario. In 1990 she won a provincial varsity championship while attending McMaster University. In 1995 she won the Ontario Scott Tournament of Hearts throwing second stones for the Alison Goring rink. The team represented Ontario at the 1995 Scott Tournament of Hearts, where they finished in fifth place with a 7-4 record.

=== Career in British Columbia ===
Gushulak later moved to B.C. At her first B.C. provincial championship she placed 2nd, in 1997. She finished third in 2000. Playing second for the Sherry Fraser rink, she played in the 2001 Canadian Olympic Curling Trials, finishing with a 2-7 record.

In 2004, playing second for Georgina Wheatcroft, she won her first B.C. provincial title. The team represented British Columbia at the 2004 Scott Tournament of Hearts, finishing in 9th place with a 4-7 record.

Gushulak would later join the Marla Mallett rink as her third. They would finish third at the 2006 British Columbia Scott Tournament of Hearts. Having prematurely given birth to a child, Gushulak did not play for the team at the provincial championships the next season, but did play for the team on the World Curling Tour. In her first Grand Slam, the 2006 Wayden Transportation Ladies Classic, the team would make it all the way to the semi-final. They returned to event in 2007, but did not make the playoffs. Later in the year, the rink would finish in fourth at the 2008 British Columbia Scotties Tournament of Hearts.

The next season, was much busier for the team. The team again played in the Wayden Transportation Ladies Classic, failing to qualify for the playoffs. They won the 2009 British Columbia Scotties Tournament of Hearts and represented British Columbia at the 2009 Scotties Tournament of Hearts on home ice in Victoria. The team finished in first place after the round robin, but lost to the defending champion Jennifer Jones rink in the final. The team played in the 2009 Players' Championships, failing to make the playoffs.

The team remained together for one more season. They would play in two Grand Slams, the 2009 Trail Appliances Curling Classic and the 2009 Manitoba Lotteries Women's Curling Classic, failing to make the playoffs at either event. The team would also play in the 2010 British Columbia Scotties Tournament of Hearts, where they finished in third.

In 2010, Gushulak joined the Allison MacInnes rink at second. The team failed to qualify for the B.C. Scotties in their first season together, but did qualify for the 2012 British Columbia Scotties Tournament of Hearts, where they finished in 8th place with a 4-5 record. At the 2013 British Columbia Scotties Tournament of Hearts, the team finished in 4th place. Gushulak was invited to play as the alternate for the B.C. team at the 2013 Scotties Tournament of Hearts. Gushulak would play in four games for the team, which was skipped by Kelly Scott. The rink would go on to win a bronze medal. The next season, the team finished in third at the 2014 British Columbia Scotties Tournament of Hearts. After the season, Gushulak would leave the rink to form her own team.

In her first season as skip, Gushulak and her rink of Grace MacInnes, Lorelle Weiss and Sandra Comadina failed to qualify for the playoffs at the 2015 British Columbia Scotties Tournament of Hearts. At the end of the season, Jessie Sanderson replaced Weiss on the team. The team made it to the playoffs at the 2016 British Columbia Scotties Tournament of Hearts after posting a 4-3 round robin record. The team would beat Sarah Wark in the 3 vs. 4 game, but lost to former World Champion Kelly Scott in the final.
