= 2009 British Columbia Scotties Tournament of Hearts =

- Host city: Parksville, British Columbia
- Arena: Parksville Curling Club
- Dates: January 21–25
- Winner: Team Mallett
- Curling club: Vancouver CC, Vancouver
- Skip: Marla Mallett
- Third: Grace MacInnes
- Second: Diane Gushulak
- Lead: Jacalyn Brown
- Finalist: Allison MacInnes

The 2009 British Columbia Scotties Tournament of Hearts, the provincial women's curling championship for British Columbia, was held January 21 to 25 at the Parksville Curling Club in Parksville, British Columbia. The winning Marla Mallett rink represented British Columbia at the 2009 Scotties Tournament of Hearts on home soil in Victoria, British Columbia.

== Teams ==
The teams are listed as follows:

| Skip | Third | Second | Lead | Club(s) |
|---|---|---|---|---|
| Brenda Garvey | Lindsay Rohel | Terri Bublitz | Chelan Geistinger | Kamloops CC, Kamloops |
| Tracey Jones | Kristen Fewster | Jennifer Fewster | Melinda Kotsch | Prince George G&CC, Prince George |
| Allison MacInnes | Sandra Jenkins | Karla Sparks | Amanda Brennan | Kamloops CC, Kamloops |
| Marla Mallett | Grace MacInnes | Diane Gushulak | Jacalyn Brown | Vancouver CC, Vancouver |
| Jodi Maskiewich | Shannon Aleksic | Jacquie Armstrong | Shannon Gallaugher | Royal City CC, New Westminster |
| Brittany Palmer | Leanne Palmer | Heather Nichol | Susan Hicks | Beaver Valley CC, Fruitvale |
| Kristen Recksiedler | Kirsten Fox | Trysta Vandale | Julie Provost | Richmond CC, Richmond |
| Georgina Wheatcroft | Stephanie Jackson | Sarah Wark | Kristen Windsor | Valley CC, Cloverdale |

== Round robin standings ==
Final Round Robin standings

Key
| Teams to Playoffs |
| Teams to Tiebreakers |

| Skip | W | L | W–L | PF | PA |
|---|---|---|---|---|---|
| Allison MacInnes | 7 | 0 | – | 47 | 29 |
| Jodi Maskiewich | 5 | 2 | – | 44 | 34 |
| Marla Mallett | 4 | 3 | 2–0 | 43 | 30 |
| Kristen Recksiedler | 4 | 3 | 1–1 | 47 | 37 |
| Georgina Wheatcroft | 4 | 3 | 0–2 | 39 | 37 |
| Brenda Garvey | 2 | 5 | 1–0 | 32 | 40 |
| Tracey Jones | 2 | 5 | 0–1 | 40 | 56 |
| Brittany Palmer | 0 | 7 | – | 29 | 57 |

== Round robin results ==
All draw times listed in Pacific Time (UTC−08:00).

=== Draw 1 ===
Wednesday, January 21, 1:00 pm

| Team | Final |
| Georgina Wheatcroft | 8 |
| Brittany Palmer | 3 |

| Team | Final |
| Jodi Maskiewich | 6 |
| Brenda Garvey | 3 |

| Team | Final |
| Tracey Jones | 5 |
| Marla Mallett | 3 |

| Team | Final |
| Allison MacInnes | 5 |
| Kristen Recksiedler | 4 |

=== Draw 2 ===
Wednesday, January 21, 7:30 pm

| Team | Final |
| Kristen Recksiedler | 7 |
| Brenda Garvey | 2 |

| Team | Final |
| Marla Mallett | 10 |
| Brittany Palmer | 3 |

| Team | Final |
| Allison MacInnes | 4 |
| Jodi Maskiewich | 3 |

| Team | Final |
| Georgina Wheatcroft | 8 |
| Tracey Jones | 5 |

=== Draw 3 ===
Thursday, January 22, 1:00 pm

| Team | Final |
| Allison MacInnes | 7 |
| Brittany Palmer | 5 |

| Team | Final |
| Jodi Maskiewich | 8 |
| Tracey Jones | 6 |

| Team | Final |
| Kristen Recksiedler | 5 |
| Georgina Wheatcroft | 4 |

| Team | Final |
| Marla Mallett | 8 |
| Brenda Garvey | 2 |

=== Draw 4 ===
Thursday, January 22, 7:30 pm

| Team | Final |
| Jodi Maskiewich | 5 |
| Marla Mallett | 3 |

| Team | Final |
| Allison MacInnes | 11 |
| Georgina Wheatcroft | 3 |

| Team | Final |
| Brenda Garvey | 10 |
| Tracey Jones | 3 |

| Team | Final |
| Kristen Recksiedler | 7 |
| Brittany Palmer | 2 |

=== Draw 5 ===
Friday, January 23, 1:00 pm

| Team | Final |
| Georgina Wheatcroft | 7 |
| Brenda Garvey | 5 |

| Team | Final |
| Kristen Recksiedler | 12 |
| Tracey Jones | 5 |

| Team | Final |
| Jodi Maskiewich | 9 |
| Brittany Palmer | 7 |

| Team | Final |
| Allison MacInnes | 5 |
| Marla Mallett | 4 |

=== Draw 6 ===
Friday, January 23, 7:30 pm

| Team | Final |
| Allison MacInnes | 9 |
| Tracey Jones | 5 |

| Team | Final |
| Brenda Garvey | 5 |
| Brittany Palmer | 3 |

| Team | Final |
| Marla Mallett | 10 |
| Kristen Recksiedler | 6 |

| Team | Final |
| Georgina Wheatcroft | 5 |
| Jodi Maskiewich | 4 |

=== Draw 7 ===
Saturday, January 24, 9:00 am

| Team | Final |
| Jodi Maskiewich | 9 |
| Kristen Recksiedler | 6 |

| Team | Final |
| Marla Mallett | 5 |
| Georgina Wheatcroft | 4 |

| Team | Final |
| Allison MacInnes | 6 |
| Brenda Garvey | 5 |

| Team | Final |
| Tracey Jones | 11 |
| Brittany Palmer | 6 |

== Tiebreakers ==
| Tiebreaker #1 | | Tiebreaker #2 |
| | | Marla Mallett | 8 |
| Kristen Recksiedler | 6 | Kristen Recksiedler | 6 |
| Georgina Wheatcroft | 4 |

=== Tiebreaker #1 ===
Saturday, January 24, 2:00 pm

| Team | Final |
| Kristen Recksiedler | 6 |
| Georgina Wheatcroft | 4 |

=== Tiebreaker #2 ===
Saturday, January 24, 7:30 pm

| Team | Final |
| Marla Mallett | 8 |
| Kristen Recksiedler | 6 |

== Playoffs ==
| Semifinal | | | Final |
| | | | 1 | Allison MacInnes | 5 |
| 2 | Jodi Maskiewich | 5 | 3 | Marla Mallett | 8 |
| 3 | Marla Mallett | 9 |

=== Semifinal ===
Sunday, January 25, 9:00 am

| Sheet B | 1 | 2 | 3 | 4 | 5 | 6 | 7 | 8 | 9 | 10 | Final |
|---|---|---|---|---|---|---|---|---|---|---|---|
| Jodi Maskiewich | 1 | 0 | 0 | 0 | 0 | 3 | 0 | 0 | 1 | X | 5 |
| Marla Mallett | 0 | 0 | 1 | 3 | 0 | 0 | 3 | 2 | 0 | X | 9 |

=== Final ===
Sunday, January 25, 2:30 pm

| Sheet C | 1 | 2 | 3 | 4 | 5 | 6 | 7 | 8 | 9 | 10 | Final |
|---|---|---|---|---|---|---|---|---|---|---|---|
| Marla Mallett | 0 | 0 | 2 | 0 | 1 | 4 | 0 | 0 | 1 | X | 8 |
| Allison MacInnes | 0 | 1 | 0 | 1 | 0 | 0 | 2 | 1 | 0 | X | 5 |

2009 British Columbia Scotties Tournament of Hearts

Marla Mallett
3rd British Columbia Provincial Championship title
