= Michelle Allen =

Canadian curler

- Curler ♀
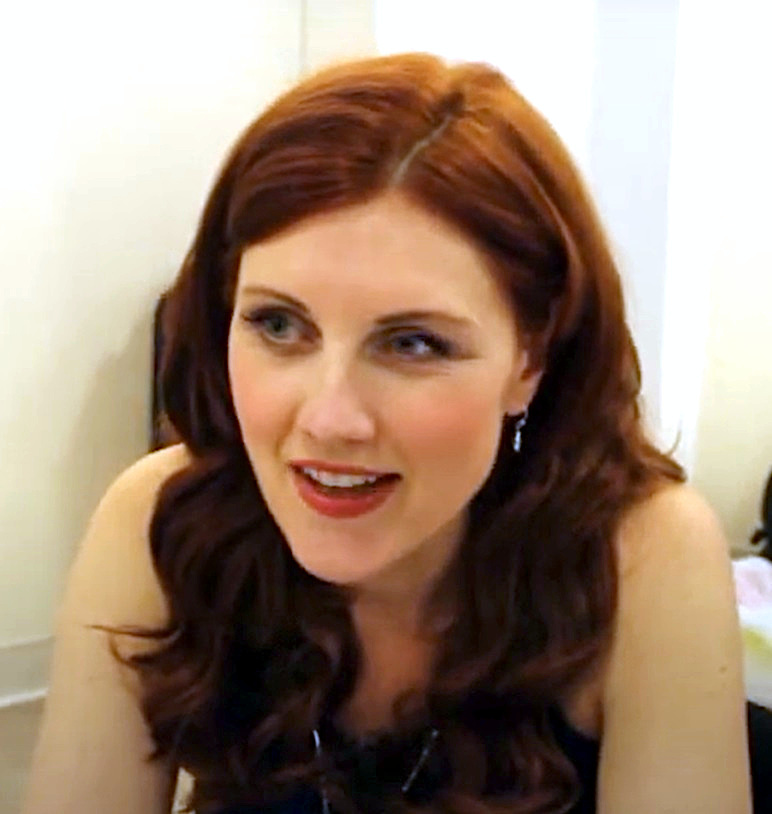
- Born: Michelle Harding

Team
- Curling club: Juan de Fuca CC, Victoria, Kelowna CC, Kelowna, Duncan CC, Duncan, Victoria CC, Victoria

Curling career
- Member Association: Canada
- Hearts: 5 (1999, 2005, 2006, 2007, 2008)
- World Championship: 2 (2006, 2007)
Medal record
Curling
World Championships
Gold medal – first place	2007 Aomori
Bronze medal – third place	2006 Grande Prairie
Scotties Tournament of Hearts
Gold medal – first place	2006 London
Gold medal – first place	2007 Lethbridge
Bronze medal – third place	2005 St. John's
Canadian Olympic Curling Trials
Silver medal – second place	2005 Halifax

Michelle Allen (née Michelle Harding) is a Canadian curler.

She was the alternate on the 2007 World champion and 2006 World bronze medallist Kelly Scott rink from 2005 to 2010.

== Teams ==
=== Women's ===
Season	Skip	Third	Second	Lead	Alternate	Coach	Events
1994–95	Michelle Harding	Shalegh Beddington	Denise Byers	Kim Danderfer			CJCC 1995 (8th)
1998–99	Pat Sanders	Michelle Harding	Cindy Tucker	Denise Byers	Shalegh Beddington		STOH 1999 (11th)
2004–05	Kelly Scott	Michelle Allen	Sasha Carter	Renee Simons	Cheryl Noble	Gerry Richard	STOH 2005 (bronze)
2005–06	Kelly Scott	Jeanna Schraeder	Sasha Carter	Renee Simons	Michelle Allen	Gerry Richard	COCT 2005 (silver); STOH 2006 (gold); WCC 2006 (bronze)
2006–07	Pat Sanders	Cheryl Noble	Michelle Allen	Roz Craig			BC STOH 2007 (4th)
2006–07	Kelly Scott	Jeanna Schraeder	Sasha Carter	Renee Simons	Michelle Allen	Gerry Richard	CCC 2006 (silver); STOH 2007 (gold); WCC 2007 (gold)
2007–08	Kelly Scott	Jeanna Schraeder	Sasha Carter	Renee Simons	Michelle Allen	Gerry Richard	CCC 2007 (gold); STOH 2008 (8th); WCC 2007 (gold)
2009–10	Kelly Scott	Jeanna Schraeder	Sasha Carter	Jacquie Armstrong	Michelle Allen	Gerry Richard	COCT 2009 (8th)
2010–11	Sarah Wark (fourth)	Michelle Allen	Roselyn Craig (skip)	Megan Reid			BC STOH 2011 (bronze)
2011–12	Sarah Wark	Michelle Allen	Roselyn Craig	Megan Reid	Denise Sellers		
2011–12	Sarah Wark (fourth)	Michelle Allen	Simone Brosseau	Roselyn Craig (skip)			BC STOH 2012 (4th)
2013–14	Sarah Wark	Michelle Allen	Simone Brosseau	Rachelle Kallechy			
2014–15	Sarah Wark	Simone Brosseau	Michelle Allen	Rachelle Kallechy	Adina Tasaka		BC STOH 2015 (silver)
2015–16	Sarah Wark	Simone Brosseau	Michelle Allen	Rachelle Kallechy			BC STOH 2016 (4th)

=== Mixed ===
Season	Skip	Third	Second	Lead	Events
2015–16	Wes Craig	Sarah Wark	Miles Craig	Michelle Allen	CMxCC 2015 (4th)
