= Sarah Wark =

Canadian curler (born 1986)

- Curler
- Born: February 17, 1986 (age 40); Winnipeg, Manitoba, Canada

Team
- Curling club: Abbotsford CC, Abbotsford, BC
- Skip: Sarah Wark
- Third: Shawna Jensen
- Second: Alyssa Kyllo
- Lead: Catera Park
- Mixed doubles partner: Jeff Richard

Curling career
- Member Association: British Columbia
- Hearts: 1 (2019)
- Top CTRS ranking: 17th (2018–19)

Sarah Wark (born February 17, 1986, in Winnipeg) is a Canadian curler from Chilliwack, British Columbia. She currently skips her own team out of Abbotsford.

== Career ==
As a junior curler, Wark and her team of Darah Provencal, Stephanie Jackson and Sarah Neal won the provincial championship in 2005. The team represented British Columbia at the 2005 Canadian Junior Curling Championships, where they would finish with a 6–6 record.

After juniors, Wark would win two provincial mixed titles, in 2009 playing third for Jason Montgomery and in 2014 as third for Wes Craig. Her win in 2009 qualified her team to represent B.C. at the 2010 Canadian Mixed Curling Championship, where they would lose in the semi-final to Ontario. Her 2014 win qualified her team to represent B.C. at the 2015 Canadian Mixed Curling Championship, where they finished fourth. Wark and Jeff Richard won the British Columbia mixed doubles title in 2017, and played in the 2017 Canadian Mixed Doubles Curling Championship, where they went 3–4, missing the playoffs.

In women's play, Wark first played in the British Columbia Scotties Tournament of Hearts, the provincial women's championships in 2008, playing second for Shellan Reed. The team finished 4–3, missing the playoffs. At the 2009 British Columbia Scotties Tournament of Hearts, Wark played second for Olympic bronze medalist Georgina Wheatcroft. After posting a 4–3 record again, the team lost in a tie breaker. Wark returned to the B.C. Scotties in 2011, throwing fourth stones for the Roselyn Craig rink. The team made the playoffs with a 6–3 record, but lost in the semi-final to the Kelly Scott rink. At the 2012 British Columbia Scotties Tournament of Hearts, the Craig rink once again made the playoffs with a 6–3 record, but this time were eliminated in the 3 vs. 4 game to Kelley Law. At the 2013 British Columbia Scotties Tournament of Hearts, Wark threw fourth stones for the Simone Brosseau team. They had less success, finishing with a 2–7 record. And, at the 2014 British Columbia Scotties Tournament of Hearts, Wark took over as skip of the team, leading the rink to a 4–5 record. At the 2015 British Columbia Scotties Tournament of Hearts, she led her team all the way to the final, where she lost to Patti Knezevic. At the 2016 event, the team made the playoffs again, but were eliminated in the 3 vs. 4 game against Diane Gushulak. After that season, Wark formed a new team with Kristen Pilote, Stephanie Prinse and Michelle Dunn. At the 2017 British Columbia Scotties Tournament of Hearts, this team also lost in the 3 vs. 4 game to Gushulak. The next season, Wark added Jen Rusnell to the team at second, replacing Prinse. On February 3, 2019, at the 2019 British Columbia Scotties Tournament of Hearts, Team Wark defeated Team Corryn Brown 7–4 in Quesnel, B.C. to claim her first B.C. Scotties Title, and win the right to represent team B.C. at the 2019 Scotties Tournament of Hearts, which took place February 16–24 in Sydney, N.S. There, Wark led her rink to a 5–6 record, for an eighth place finish. The following year, Team Wark lost 8–7 in extra ends in the final of the 2020 British Columbia Scotties Tournament of Hearts to Team Brown, whom they had defeated the previous year in the B.C. Scotties final.

On the World Curling Tour, Wark has won four events, the first coming at 2011 Vancouver Island Shootout, playing for the Craig team, then winning the event again in 2014 as a skip, winning the September 2017 King Cash Spiel and the 2018 Driving Force Abbotsford Cashpiel. Wark has played in three Grand Slam events, the 2007 Wayden Transportation Ladies Classic with Reed (0–3), the 2008 Wayden Transportation Ladies Classic with Maskiewich (3–3), and the 2009 Trail Appliances Curling Classic with Wheatcroft (3–3).

== Personal life ==
Wark works as an associate insurance advisor for Cathcart Financial Solutions Ltd - The Co-operators.
