= Sarah Pyke =

Canadian curler (born 1987)

- Curler
- Born: Sarah Wazney; January 13, 1987 (age 39); Winnipeg, Manitoba, Canada

Team
- Skip: Kristy Watling
- Third: Laura Burtnyk
- Second: Emily Deschênes
- Lead: Sarah Pyke
- Alternate: Laura Burtnyk

Curling career
- Member Association: Manitoba (2002–2012; 2016–present); British Columbia (2012–2016)
- Hearts: 1 (2013)
- Top CTRS ranking: 22nd (2023–24)
Medal record
Curling
World Junior Championships
Bronze medal – third place	2008 Östersund
Scotties Tournament of Hearts
Bronze medal – third place	2013 Kingston

Sarah Pyke (born January 13, 1987, in Winnipeg, Manitoba, as Sarah Wazney) is a Canadian curler. She currently plays lead on Team Kristy Watling. She is a former Canadian junior champion and World junior bronze medallist.

== Curling career ==
=== Juniors ===
Pyke's junior career involved winning a number of provincial titles. She played for Manitoba at the 2003 Canada Winter Games, she won the 2001 and 2003 Manitoba Under 16 championships, was a silver medallist at the 2004 U18 Optimist International event. She was also a CIS/CCA Canadian University Gold Medallist in 2008.

In 2007 Pyke won the 2008 Manitoba mixed title playing lead for Reid Carruthers. The team represented Manitoba at the 2008 Canadian Mixed Curling Championship where they finished with a 5–6 record.

In 2008, Pyke played lead for the Manitoba junior provincial championship rink skipped by Kaitlyn Lawes. The team represented Manitoba at the 2008 Canadian Junior Curling Championships where they won the championship. The team then represented Canada at the 2008 World Junior Curling Championships where they won a bronze medal.

=== Women's ===
After her 2008 junior run, Pyke was too old to continue playing with the Lawes junior team, and began women's play as the lead for the Kerri Einarson rink. The following season (2009–10) she moved to play second for the Jenna Loder rink. The next season (2010–11), she moved back to lead with the Sabrina Neufeld team, and then the next season (2011–12) she moved to play lead for the Jill Thurston rink. In 2012, Pyke moved from her native province of Manitoba to Kelowna, BC to play lead for the Kelly Scott team.

On the World Curling Tour, Pyke played in her first Grand Slam event playing with Loder at the 2009 Manitoba Lotteries Women's Curling Classic. However, the team was eliminated without winning a game. Pyke played in two Grand Slams with Thurston. At the 2011 Curlers Corner Autumn Gold Curling Classic the team was eliminated with a 2–3 record. At the 2011 Manitoba Lotteries Women's Curling Classic the team was also eliminated with a 2–3 record. With Scott, Pyke would play in four Grand Slams. At the 2012 Curlers Corner Autumn Gold Curling Classic, the team lost in the semi-final to Sherry Middaugh. At the 2012 Manitoba Lotteries Women's Curling Classic the team was eliminated with a 3–3 record. At the 2012 Manitoba Lotteries Women's Curling Classic the team was eliminated with a 1–3 record and at the 2012 The Masters Grand Slam of Curling team finished pool play with a 2–3 record.

Pyke played in her first Manitoba provincial championship with Thurston in 2012. That team finished 5-2 in pool play but lost in a tie-breaker against Jennifer Jones. After moving to play with Kelly Scott, Pyke played in her first British Columbia Scotties Tournament of Hearts in 2013 which they won, sending Pyke to her first Scotties Tournament of Hearts. At the 2013 Scotties Tournament of Hearts, the team would end up winning a bronze medal.

The following season, the team was less successful, losing in the final of the 2014 British Columbia Scotties Tournament of Hearts to Kesa Van Osch.
