= Kelly Scott =

Canadian curler (born 1977)

Kelly Lynn Scott
- Curler
- Born: June 1, 1977 (age 49); Winnipeg, Manitoba, Canada

Curling career
- Hearts: 8 (2005, 2006, 2007, 2008, 2010, 2011, 2012, 2013)
- World Championship: 2 (2006, 2007)
- Olympic: 0
- Top CTRS ranking: 2nd (2004-05, 2005-06, 2006-07)
- Grand Slam victories: 3: Autumn Gold: 1 (2006); Manitoba Liquor & Lotteries: 1 (2009); Wayden Transportation: 1 (2007)
Medal record
Women's Curling
Representing Canada
World Championships
Gold medal – first place	2007 Aomori
Bronze medal – third place	2006 Grande Prairie
Scotties Tournament of Hearts
Gold medal – first place	2007 Lethbridge
World Junior Championships
Gold medal – first place	1995 Perth
Representing British Columbia
Canadian Olympic Curling Trials
Silver medal – second place	2005 Halifax
Scotties Tournament of Hearts
Gold medal – first place	2006 London
Silver medal – second place	2012 Red Deer
Bronze medal – third place	2005 St. John's
Bronze medal – third place	2013 Kingston
Representing Manitoba
Canadian Junior Curling Championships
Gold medal – first place	1995 Regina

Kelly Scott (born June 1, 1977 in Winnipeg, Manitoba as Kelly Lynn Mackenzie) is a Canadian curler from Kelowna, British Columbia.

== Career ==
=== 1995–2005 ===
Scott won the 1995 Canadian Junior Curling Championships and the 1995 World Junior Curling Championships when she curled out of Manitoba. She was also runner up at the 1991 Canadian Junior Curling Championships when she played lead for Jill Staub. Scott moved to British Columbia with her family in the late 1990s. In 2005, she won her first BC Tournament of Hearts, defeating Patti Knezevic 7–6 in the final, winning in extra ends. This qualified Scott to represent British Columbia at the 2005 Scott Tournament of Hearts, where she finished second in the round-robin, but lost both of her playoff games.

=== 2005–2011 ===
The Scott team participated at the 2005 Canadian Olympic Curling Trials, where they finished in first place in round robin with a 7–2 record. They faced Shannon Kleibrink in the final, and leading 7–5 after nine ends, gave up three in the tenth, losing the Olympic bid to Kleibrink.

In March 2006, Scott won the 2006 Scott Tournament of Hearts. After leading the round robin with a 9–2 record, she beat Colleen Jones in the semi-final and then beat defending champion Jennifer Jones in the final with an 8–6 win. The Scott team went on to the 2006 Ford World Women's Curling Championship in Grande Prairie, Alberta where her team won the bronze medal.

At the 2006 Players' Championships, Scott scored a rare "eight-ender" in one of her games against Cathy King.

Scott defended her title at the 2007 Scotties Tournament of Hearts, defeating Jan Betker's Saskatchewan team in the final. Later, she won the 2007 World Women's Curling Championship, defeating Denmark's team of Angelina Jensen 8–4 in final. Scott became the first female skip to win a gold medal at both a World Junior Championship and a World Championship.

Scott works at Nutri-Lawn, which is owned by her parents, as a Financial Officer. In summer 2006, Kelly Scott quit her job with the city of Kelowna due to the heavy pressure of the competitive curling season.

She is married to Chad Scott.

In 2009, Kelly Scott's team failed to represent B.C. at the Tournament of Hearts for the since time since 2004. This, coupled with a disappointing finish in the CTRS standings, prompted the team to remove Renee Simons from the team.

Scott and the team competed in the 2009 Canadian Olympic Curling Trials; however, they finished round robin in last place, with a 1–6 record.

At the 2010 Scotties Tournament of Hearts, Scott lost in the 3vs4 Page playoff game to Ontario's Krista McCarville.

For the second straight year at the British Columbia Scotties Tournament of Hearts, Scott defeated Kelley Law in the final to win the provincial championship. At the 2011 Scotties Tournament of Hearts, Scott and team finished the round robin with a 7–4 record which found them in a tie-breaker, where they were defeated by Nova Scotia's Heather Smith-Dacey.

=== 2011–2016 ===
For the 2011-2012 season, Scott's longtime third, Jeanna Schraeder left the team due to a pregnancy and to focus on family. Schraeder was replaced with three time British Columbia Junior Champion Dailene Sivertson. Together the team would defeat Marla Mallett at the 2012 British Columbia Scotties Tournament of Hearts, earning the right to represent the province at the 2012 Scotties Tournament of Hearts. The team would find difficulties with illness and lineup changes, but also found success at the event. They would finish round robin with an 8-3 record, which was enough to secure a second-place finish, and earned a spot in the 1-2 game against Manitoba's Jennifer Jones. The team would defeat Jones in the 1-2 game 7-5 advancing to the final.

Schraeder re-joined the team for the 2012-13 season at the third position, replacing Sivertson who moved to Saskatchewan to play lead for Amber Holland. The team also welcomed the addition of Sarah Wazney at the lead position, who replaced Jacquie Armstrong at lead, who became the team's alternate. The team won another provincial title, defeating Patti Knezevic in the final of the 2013 British Columbia Scotties Tournament of Hearts. At the 2013 Scotties Tournament of Hearts Scott led her team to a bronze medal finish.

At the 2014 British Columbia Scotties Tournament of Hearts, Scott lost in the final to Kesa Van Osch. After the season, her team broke up, and she formed a new team with Shannon Aleksic, Karla Thompson and Sarah Pyke. At the 2015 British Columbia Scotties Tournament of Hearts, she lost in the semifinal. After the season Jenna Loder replaced Thompson on the team. Thompson formed her own rink, and would go on to beat Scott in the 2016 British Columbia Scotties Tournament of Hearts final. Scott has not curled competitively since then.

== Grand Slam record ==
Key
C	Champion
F	Lost in Final
SF	Lost in Semifinal
QF	Lost in Quarterfinals
R16	Lost in the round of 16
Q	Did not advance to playoffs
T2	Played in Tier 2 event
DNP	Did not participate in event
N/A	Not a Grand Slam event that season

Event	2005–06	2006–07	2007–08	2008–09	2009–10	2010–11	2011–12	2012–13	2013-14
The Masters Grand Slam of Curling	N/A	N/A	N/A	N/A	N/A	N/A	N/A	Q	DNP
Players' Championships	QF	F	Q	SF	QF	DNP	DNP	DNP	DNP

=== Former events ===
Event	2006–07	2007–08	2008–09	2009–10	2010–11	2011–12	2012–13	2013-14
Autumn Gold	C	QF	Q	Q	Q	Q	SF	Q
Manitoba Lotteries	Q	DNP	F	C	QF	QF	Q	DNP
Colonial Square Ladies Classic	N/A	N/A	N/A	N/A	N/A	N/A	Q	DNP
Wayden Transportation	QF	C	QF	N/A	N/A	N/A	N/A	N/A
Sobeys Slam	N/A	DNP	Q	N/A	DNP	N/A	N/A	N/A
