= Patti Knezevic =

Canadian curler

- Curler
- Born: c. 1973 (age 52–53)

Team
- Curling club: Victoria CC, Victoria, BC

Curling career
- Member Association: British Columbia
- Hearts: 2 (2014, 2015)

Patti Knezevic (born c. 1973 in Prince George, British Columbia as Patti Thompson) is a Canadian curler from Prince George, British Columbia.

Knezevic skipped Team British Columbia at the 1993 Canadian Junior Curling Championships. Her rink of Lori Pratt, Kim Winkel and Tracey Martin finished the round robin in second place with a record of 9-2, but they lost in the semi-final to Quebec's Janique Berthelot.

Knezevic finished as runner-up at the British Columbia provincials in 2005, losing to Kelly Scott, in 2007 to Kelley Law, and in 2013 to Scott again. Knezevic's first appearance at the Scotties Tournament of Hearts was in 2014, when she was the alternate for Kesa Van Osch's rink. She skipped the rink for two games when Van Osch had to sit out with an illness. Knezevic returned the following year, after winning the 2015 British Columbia Scotties Tournament of Hearts. At the 2015 Scotties Tournament of Hearts, she led her British Columbia rink to a 1-10 record, which was last place. This result relegated British Columbia to have to play in the pre-qualifying event at the 2016 Hearts.

Knezevic has one World Curling Tour title from the Cloverdale Cash Spiel in 2013.
