= Allison MacInnes =

Canadian curler

- Curler

Curling career
- Hearts: 2 (1998, 2008)

Allison MacInnes (born May 30, 1973 in Oban, Scotland) is a Canadian curler from Kamloops, British Columbia. She currently coaches the Corryn Brown rink.

MacInnes is a two-time junior and two time provincial women's champion.

MacInnes and her rink of Jeanna Richard, Sarah Eden and Renee Lemke represented British Columbia at the 1991 Canadian Junior Curling Championships. The team would finish the round robin with a 4–7 record, well out of the playoffs. MacInnes returned at the 1992 Canadian Juniors with a new team of Erin Forrest, Heather Mockford and Jo-Ann Wright. That team won one more game, finishing with a 5–6 record.

After juniors, MacInnes won two provincial titles. Her first provincial title came in 1998 as the second for Sue Garvey. At the 1998 Scott Tournament of Hearts, the team finished the round robin with a 6–5 record, tied with Saskatchewan's Cathy Trowell in 4th place. In the tie-breaker match, they defeated Trowell but lost in the 3 vs. 4 Page playoff game against Team Canada (the defending champion), skipped by Sandra Schmirler. MacInnes returned to the Hearts in 2008 after winning the provincial championship that year. MacInnes skipped the BC team of Karla Sparks, Janelle Yardley and Amanda Brennan. At the 2008 Scotties Tournament of Hearts, they finished the round robin with a 4–7 record, missing the playoffs.

== Personal life ==
MacInnes works as a supervisor of administrative services for Kamloops Home Health. She is married and has two children.
