= Kesa Van Osch =

Canadian curler

Kesa Van Osch (born December 12, 1991, in Nanaimo, British Columbia) is a Canadian curler from Parksville, British Columbia. She was the skip of the winning team at the 2014 British Columbia Scotties Tournament of Hearts, and finished 5th in the 2014 Scotties Tournament of Hearts.

Van Osch also represented British Columbia at the 2012 Canadian Junior Curling Championships where she led her team to a third-place finish.

== Teams ==
Season	Skip	Third	Second	Lead
2012–13	Sarah Wark (fourth)	Nicole Backe (skip)	Kesa Van Osch	Janelle Erwin
2013–14	Kesa Van Osch	Steph Baier	Jessie Sanderson	Carley Sandwith
2014–15	Kesa Van Osch	Kalia Van Osch	Trysta Vandale	Brooklyn Leitch
2015–16	Kesa Van Osch	Kalia Van Osch	Shawna Jensen	Carley St. Blaze
2016–17	Kesa Van Osch	Kalia Van Osch	Shawna Jensen	Amy Gibson
2017–18	Kesa Van Osch	Marika Van Osch	Kalia Van Osch	Amy Gibson
