= 2006 British Columbia Scott Tournament of Hearts =

Provincial curling championship

- Host city: Williams Lake, British Columbia
- Arena: Williams Lake Curling Club
- Dates: January 25–29
- Winner: Team Scott
- Curling club: Kelowna CC, Kelowna
- Skip: Kelly Scott
- Third: Jeanna Schraeder
- Second: Sasha Carter
- Lead: Renee Simons
- Finalist: Toni Wells

The 2006 British Columbia Scott Tournament of Hearts, the provincial women's curling championship for British Columbia, was held January 25 to 29 at the Williams Lake Curling Club in Williams Lake, British Columbia. The winning Kelly Scott rink represented British Columbia at the 2006 Scott Tournament of Hearts in London, Ontario, where they finished first in the round robin with a 9–2 record and went on to win the national title.

== Teams ==
The teams are listed as follows:

Skip	Third	Second	Lead	Club(s)
Tracey Jones	Melinda Kotsch	Kay Thompson	Amber Cheveldave	Prince George G&CC, Prince George
Kristy Lewis	Krista Bernard	Heather Mockford	Jacalyn Brown	Richmond CC, Richmond
Marla Mallett	Diane McLean	Christen Crossley	Christine Miller	Royal City CC, New Westminster
Lyn Perry	Jackie Clement	Dawn Game	Michelle Wolff	Summerland CC, Summerland
Kristen Recksiedler	Mia Hockley	Blisse Comstock	Shannon Aleksic	Royal City CC, New Westminster
Kelly Scott	Jeanna Schraeder	Sasha Carter	Renee Simons	Kelowna CC, Kelowna
Toni Wells	Teri Tomczyk	Lori Olsen	Angela Strachan	Golden Ears WC, Maple Ridge
Jill Winters	Allison Hurley	Kelli May	Lisa Nevakshonoff	Nelson CC, Nelson

== Round robin standings ==
Final Round Robin Standings

Key
Teams to Playoffs

Skip	W	L	W–L	PF	PA	EW	EL	BE	SE
Kelly Scott	6	1	1–0	51	30	26	22	12	6
Toni Wells	6	1	0–1	57	29	33	18	6	12
Marla Mallett	5	2	–	46	38	26	26	8	7
Tracey Jones	4	3	–	39	39	26	24	10	9
Kristen Recksiedler	3	4	1–0	35	46	25	28	10	8
Kristy Lewis	3	4	0–1	48	42	29	29	9	6
Lyn Perry	1	6	–	27	61	23	31	7	5
Jill Winters	0	7	–	28	56	22	32	8	4

== Round robin results ==
All draw times listed in Pacific Time (UTC−08:00).

=== Draw 1 ===
Wednesday, January 25, 12:30 pm

Sheet A	1	2	3	4	5	6	7	8	9	10	Final
Lyn Perry	1	0	0	0	2	0	0	0	2	1	6
Kristen Recksiedler	0	1	1	0	0	3	1	1	0	0	7

Sheet B	1	2	3	4	5	6	7	8	9	10	Final
Toni Wells	0	2	0	1	0	0	3	3	X	X	9
Tracey Jones	0	0	1	0	1	0	0	0	X	X	2

Sheet C	1	2	3	4	5	6	7	8	9	10	Final
Jill Winters	0	1	0	0	0	1	0	3	1	X	6
Marla Mallett	3	0	2	0	1	0	4	0	0	X	10

Sheet D	1	2	3	4	5	6	7	8	9	10	Final
Kristy Lewis	0	1	1	0	3	0	0	0	0	5	10
Kelly Scott	1	0	0	1	0	0	0	1	1	0	4

=== Draw 2 ===
Wednesday, January 25, 7:30 pm

Sheet A	1	2	3	4	5	6	7	8	9	10	Final
Tracey Jones	0	0	1	0	0	0	3	1	2	X	7
Kristy Lewis	0	1	0	1	1	0	0	0	0	X	3

Sheet B	1	2	3	4	5	6	7	8	9	10	Final
Lyn Perry	0	1	1	0	0	2	0	2	0	X	6
Marla Mallett	0	0	0	3	3	0	2	0	2	X	10

Sheet C	1	2	3	4	5	6	7	8	9	10	Final
Toni Wells	0	1	0	1	0	2	0	0	0	X	4
Kelly Scott	0	0	3	0	2	0	2	1	0	X	8

Sheet D	1	2	3	4	5	6	7	8	9	10	Final
Kristen Recksiedler	0	0	1	1	2	0	0	0	0	2	6
Jill Winters	0	0	0	0	0	1	1	0	2	0	4

=== Draw 3 ===
Thursday, January 26, 12:30 pm

Sheet A	1	2	3	4	5	6	7	8	9	10	Final
Kelly Scott	2	0	2	0	0	2	0	4	X	X	10
Lyn Perry	0	1	0	2	0	0	1	0	X	X	4

Sheet B	1	2	3	4	5	6	7	8	9	10	Final
Jill Winters	0	0	0	2	0	0	0	X	X	X	2
Toni Wells	1	2	2	0	2	1	1	X	X	X	9

Sheet C	1	2	3	4	5	6	7	8	9	10	11	Final
Kristy Lewis	0	1	0	2	0	1	0	2	0	0	0	6
Kristen Recksiedler	0	0	2	0	1	0	2	0	0	1	2	8

Sheet D	1	2	3	4	5	6	7	8	9	10	Final
Marla Mallett	0	2	0	2	0	2	1	2	X	X	9
Tracey Jones	1	0	1	0	1	0	0	0	X	X	3

=== Draw 4 ===
Thursday, January 26, 7:30 pm

Sheet A	1	2	3	4	5	6	7	8	9	10	Final
Toni Wells	3	0	2	2	2	0	1	X	X	X	10
Marla Mallett	0	1	0	0	0	1	0	X	X	X	2

Sheet B	1	2	3	4	5	6	7	8	9	10	Final
Kristen Recksiedler	0	1	0	1	0	0	X	X	X	X	2
Kelly Scott	0	0	3	0	2	4	X	X	X	X	9

Sheet C	1	2	3	4	5	6	7	8	9	10	Final
Tracey Jones	0	1	2	0	2	0	2	0	2	X	9
Jill Winters	0	0	0	1	0	1	0	1	0	X	3

Sheet D	1	2	3	4	5	6	7	8	9	10	Final
Lyn Perry	0	2	0	2	0	1	0	0	X	X	5
Kristy Lewis	3	0	4	0	1	0	1	3	X	X	12

=== Draw 5 ===
Friday, January 27, 12:30 pm

Sheet A	1	2	3	4	5	6	7	8	9	10	Final
Kristen Recksiedler	1	0	0	2	0	1	0	1	0	0	5
Tracey Jones	0	1	1	0	1	0	0	0	2	1	6

Sheet B	1	2	3	4	5	6	7	8	9	10	Final
Kristy Lewis	1	0	2	0	1	0	3	0	1	X	8
Jill Winters	0	1	0	1	0	2	0	1	0	X	5

Sheet C	1	2	3	4	5	6	7	8	9	10	Final
Lyn Perry	0	1	0	4	0	0	0	0	0	X	5
Toni Wells	0	0	1	0	3	0	1	1	2	X	8

Sheet D	1	2	3	4	5	6	7	8	9	10	Final
Kelly Scott	1	0	1	0	2	1	0	2	0	X	7
Marla Mallett	0	0	0	1	0	0	2	0	1	X	4

=== Draw 6 ===
Friday, January 27, 7:30 pm

Sheet A	1	2	3	4	5	6	7	8	9	10	Final
Jill Winters	1	0	0	0	1	0	1	1	0	X	4
Kelly Scott	0	1	0	0	0	1	0	0	4	X	6

Sheet B	1	2	3	4	5	6	7	8	9	10	Final
Tracey Jones	0	1	1	0	2	5	0	1	X	X	10
Lyn Perry	1	0	0	0	0	0	2	0	X	X	3

Sheet C	1	2	3	4	5	6	7	8	9	10	Final
Marla Mallett	0	2	0	0	0	1	1	0	1	X	5
Kristy Lewis	0	0	0	1	1	0	0	0	0	X	2

Sheet D	1	2	3	4	5	6	7	8	9	10	Final
Toni Wells	4	0	2	0	1	1	1	X	X	X	9
Kristen Recksiedler	0	2	0	1	0	0	0	X	X	X	3

=== Draw 7 ===
Saturday, January 28, 9:30 am

Sheet A	1	2	3	4	5	6	7	8	9	10	Final
Kristy Lewis	3	0	1	0	1	0	1	0	1	0	7
Toni Wells	0	1	0	2	0	2	0	1	0	2	8

Sheet B	1	2	3	4	5	6	7	8	9	10	Final
Marla Mallett	0	2	0	0	2	0	1	0	1	X	6
Kristen Recksiedler	1	0	0	1	0	2	0	0	0	X	4

Sheet C	1	2	3	4	5	6	7	8	9	10	Final
Kelly Scott	0	0	2	0	1	0	0	4	X	X	7
Tracey Jones	1	0	0	0	0	0	1	0	X	X	2

Sheet D	1	2	3	4	5	6	7	8	9	10	Final
Jill Winters	0	1	0	0	0	2	0	1	0	X	4
Lyn Perry	2	0	0	2	1	0	1	0	2	X	8

== Playoffs ==
Semifinal			Final
			1	Kelly Scott	8
2	Toni Wells	8	2	Toni Wells	5
3	Marla Mallett	6

=== Semifinal ===
Saturday, January 28, 7:30 pm

Sheet A	1	2	3	4	5	6	7	8	9	10	Final
Toni Wells	0	2	3	0	0	1	1	1	0	X	8
Marla Mallett	0	0	0	1	2	0	0	0	3	X	6

=== Final ===
Sunday, January 29, 2:30 pm

Sheet A	1	2	3	4	5	6	7	8	9	10	Final
Kelly Scott	2	0	2	0	2	0	0	1	0	1	8
Toni Wells	0	1	0	2	0	1	0	0	1	0	5

2006 British Columbia Scott Tournament of Hearts

Kelly Scott
2nd British Columbia Provincial Championship title
