= St. Andrews Island =

St. Andrews Island may refer to:

- A former name of the Kunta Kinteh Island
- A small island in St. Andrews Bay (Florida), USA
- A small island by St. Andrews, Nova Scotia, Canada
