= Jeanna Schraeder =

Canadian curler (born 1976)

- Curler
- Born: Jeanna Richard; September 21, 1976 (age 50); Kelowna, British Columbia

Team
- Curling club: Kelowna CC, Kelowna, BC

Curling career
- Member Association: British Columbia
- Hearts: 7 (2006, 2007, 2008, 2010, 2011, 2013, 2022)
- World Championship: 2 (2006, 2007)
- Top CTRS ranking: 2nd (2004-05, 2005–06, 2006–07)
- Grand Slam victories: 3: (Autumn Gold, 2006; Manitoba Lotteries, 2009; Wayden Transportation, 2007
Medal record
Curling
Representing Canada
World Championships
Gold medal – first place	2007 Aomori
Bronze medal – third place	2006 Grande Prairie
Scotties Tournament of Hearts
Gold medal – first place	2007 Lethbridge
Representing British Columbia
Scotties Tournament of Hearts
Gold medal – first place	2006 London
Bronze medal – third place	2013 Kingston
Canadian Olympic Curling Trials
Silver medal – second place	2005 Halifax

Jeanna Lyn Schraeder (born September 21, 1976 in Kelowna, British Columbia as Jeanna Richard) is a Canadian curler from Kelowna, British Columbia.

== Career ==
=== Juniors ===
Schraeder won her first junior provincial championship in 1991 playing lead for Allison MacInnes. She won again in 1994 and 1996 skipping her own teams, however she never won a national title.

=== 2003–2009 ===
Schraeder eventually joined up with 1995 World Junior Champion Kelly Scott. She played third for Scott at the 2003 Canada Cup. Schreader would not participate in the 2004/2005 season, as she was pregnant.

The team would participate at the 2005 Canadian Olympic Curling Trials, where they would finish first place in round robin with a 7-2 record. They would face Shannon Kleibrink in the final, and leading 7-5 after nine ends, would give up three in the tenth, losing the olympic bid to Kleibrink.

In 2006 Schraeder would return to the team, and they would win the 2006 British Columbia Scott Tournament of Hearts. The team would again find success at the 2006 Scott Tournament of Hearts, where they finished round robin in first place with a 9-2 record. The team would defeat Nova Scotia's Colleen Jones in the 1-2 and would get a bye to the final. The team would meet the defending champions, Jennifer Jones, in the final where they would win 8-5 and the national championship. The team would just make the playoffs at the 2006 Ford World Women's Curling Championship. They would defeat Germany's Andrea Schöpp in the 3-4 game, before losing the semi-final to the U.S and Debbie McCormick.

As defending champions the team would return to the 2007 Scotties Tournament of Hearts, where for a second year in a row, would finish first place in round robin with a 10-1 record. They would lose the 1-2 game to Saskatchewan's Jan Betker, but would go on to defeat Manitoba's Jennifer Jones in the semi-final. They would face Betker again in the final, and this time defeated the team winning their second national championship. At the 2007 World Women's Curling Championship, the team would finish first place in round robin with a 10-1 record. They would defeat Denmark's Angelina Jensen in the 1-2 game, receiving a bye to the final. They would end up meeting Jensen once again in the final, and would successfully defeat the Denmark team, winning their first world championship.

Returning to the 2008 Scotties Tournament of Hearts as defending champions, the team would not find success this time around. They would fail to qualify for the playoffs, finish round robin with a disappointing 5-6 record.

After a disappointing 2008 season, the team made the decision to part ways with lead Renee Simons, replacing her with Jacquie Armstrong. The newly revamped team would still find difficulties, failing to qualify for the 2009 provincials. They would get the opportunity to compete in the 2009 Canadian Olympic Curling Trials, however would finish round robin last place, with a 1-6 record.

=== 2010–2014 ===
Schreader, along with the rest of the Scott team would qualify for and win the 2010 British Columbia Scotties Tournament of Hearts. When they returned to the 2010 Scotties Tournament of Hearts, the team would again make the playoffs, having finished round robin third, with a 7-4 record. They would face Ontario's Krista McCarville in the 3-4 game and would lose 6-4.

For a second year in a row the team would qualify for and win the 2011 British Columbia Scotties Tournament of Hearts. At the 2011 Scotties Tournament of Hearts following the conclusion of round robin play, the team would be tied for fourth place with a 7-4 record. They would enter a tiebreaker with Nova Scotia's Heather Smith-Dacey. In spite of stealing two points in the tenth end, the team would fall short losing the tiebreaker 9-8.

For the 2011-2012 season Schrarder announced she would depart the Scott team, as she was expecting her third child in November 2011. She was replaced by Dailene Sivertson. She returned to the Scott team at the conclusion of the 2011-12 season, and rejoins Scott and Carter, as well as new lead Sarah Wazney. The team went on to win a bronze medal at the 2013 Scotties Tournament of Hearts.

Schraeder left the Scott rink in 2014 to devote more time to family

=== 2020–present ===
On March 3, 2020, it was announced she and former teammates Sasha Carter and Renee Simons would be skipped by five-time Scotties Champion Mary-Anne Arsenault for the 2020–21 season. The team played in one event during the abbreviated season, finishing runner-up at the Sunset Ranch Kelowna Double Cash to Team Corryn Brown. Due to the COVID-19 pandemic in British Columbia, the 2021 provincial championship was cancelled. As the reigning provincial champions, Team Brown was invited to represent British Columbia at the 2021 Scotties Tournament of Hearts, which they accepted, ending the season for Team Arsenault.

The next season, the team again reached the final of the Sunset Ranch Kelowna Double Cash, losing to the Kaila Buchy junior rink. They were able to compete in their provincial championship at the 2022 British Columbia Scotties Tournament of Hearts in Kamloops from January 5 to 9. After losing to Team Kayla MacMillan in both the A Final and 1 vs. 2 page playoff game, Team Arsenault defeated MacMillan 8–6 in the final to win the provincial championship. At the 2022 Scotties Tournament of Hearts, the team finished with a 3–5 round robin record, defeating Quebec, the Northwest Territories and the Yukon in their three victories.

== Personal life ==
Schreader is married and has three children. She works as a digital health manager for Interior Health. She is a graduate of Okanagan University College.

Schraeder grew up in family of curlers: her father is Gerry Richard, curler and coach, World and Canadian champion, and her brother Jeff played in two Briers.
