= Sasha Carter =

Canadian curler

- Curler
- Born: Sasha Bergner; July 20, 1974 (age 52); Ashern, Manitoba

Team
- Curling club: Kelowna CC, Kelowna, BC

Curling career
- Member Association: Manitoba (1995–2005); British Columbia (2005–current)
- Hearts: 10 (2005, 2006, 2007, 2008, 2010, 2011, 2012, 2013, 2016, 2022)
- World Championship: 2 (2006, 2007)
- Top CTRS ranking: 2nd (2004-05, 2005–06, 2006–07)
- Grand Slam victories: 3: Autumn Gold, 2006; Manitoba Lotteries, 2009; Wayden Transportation, 2007
Medal record
Women's curling
Representing Canada
World Championships
Gold medal – first place	2007 Aomori
Bronze medal – third place	2006 Grande Prairie
Scotties Tournament of Hearts
Gold medal – first place	2007 Lethbridge
World Junior Championships
Gold medal – first place	1995 Perth
Representing British Columbia
Scotties Tournament of Hearts
Gold medal – first place	2006 London
Silver medal – second place	2012 Red Deer
Bronze medal – third place	2005 St. John's
Bronze medal – third place	2013 Kingston
Canadian Olympic Curling Trials
Silver medal – second place	2005 Halifax
Representing Manitoba
Canadian Junior Curling Championships
Gold medal – first place	1995 Regina

Sasha Carter (born July 20, 1974 in Ashern, Manitoba) also known as Sasha Bergner, is a Canadian curler from Kelowna, British Columbia.

== Career ==
=== Juniors ===
Carter has been a long time team mate of Scott. She represented Manitoba at the 1995 Canadian Junior Curling Championships, where the team finished round robin with a 7-4 record. They played the defending champions, Jennifer Jones in the semi-final and won, moving on to face Ontario's Kirsten Harmark (Wall) in the final. The team ended up defeating Ontario and winning the championship, going on to win the 1995 World Junior Curling Championships.

=== 2005–2009 ===
Both Scott and Carter moved to British Columbia and remained team mates there. Together along with Michelle Allen and Renee Simons, the team won the 2005 British Columbia Scott Tournament of Hearts. Carter and Scott played in their first National Women's Championship. They found success at the 2005 Scott Tournament of Hearts, when they finished round robin with a second place 8-3 record. They lost to Manitoba's Jennifer Jones in the 1-2 game, before losing the semi-final to Ontario's Jenn Hanna.

The team participated at the 2005 Canadian Olympic Curling Trials, where they finished first place in round robin with a 7-2 record. They would faced Shannon Kleibrink in the final, and leading 7-5 after nine ends, gave up three in the tenth, losing the olympic bid to Kleibrink.

In 2006 Jeanna Schraeder returned to the team, and they won the 2006 British Columbia Scott Tournament of Hearts. The team again succeeded at the 2006 Scott Tournament of Hearts, where they finished round robin in first place with a 9-2 record. The team defeated Nova Scotia's Colleen Jones in the 1-2 and got a bye to the final. The team met the defending champions, Jennifer Jones, in the final where they won 8-5 and the national championship. The team just made the playoffs at the 2006 Ford World Women's Curling Championship. They defeated Germany's Andrea Schöpp in the 3-4 game, before losing the semi-final to the U.S and Debbie McCormick.

As defending champions the team returned to the 2007 Scotties Tournament of Hearts, where for a second year in a row, finished first place in round robin with a 10-1 record. They lost the 1-2 game to Saskatchewan's Jan Betker, but went on to defeat Manitoba's Jennifer Jones in the semi-final. They faced Betker again in the final, and this time defeated the team winning their second national championship. At the 2007 World Women's Curling Championship, the team finished first place in round robin with a 10-1 record. They defeated Denmark's Angelina Jensen in the 1-2 game, receiving a bye to the final. They met Jensen once again in the final, and successfully defeated the Denmark team, winning their first world championship.

Returning to the 2008 Scotties Tournament of Hearts as defending champions, the team did not find success this time around. They failed to qualify for the playoffs, finish round robin with a disappointing 5-6 record.

After a disappointing 2008 season, the team made the decision to part ways with lead Renee Simons, replacing her with Jacquie Armstrong. The newly revamped team still had difficulties, failing to qualify for the 2009 provincials. They got the opportunity to compete in the 2009 Canadian Olympic Curling Trials, however finished round robin last place, with a 1-6 record.

=== 2010–2013 ===
Carter, along with the rest of the Scott team qualified for and won the 2010 British Columbia Scotties Tournament of Hearts. When they returned to the 2010 Scotties Tournament of Hearts, the team again made the playoffs, having finished round robin third, with a 7-4 record. They faced Ontario's Krista McCarville in the 3-4 game and lost 4-6.

For a second year in a row the team qualified for and win the 2011 British Columbia Scotties Tournament of Hearts. This time Carter attended the 2011 Scotties Tournament of Hearts six months pregnant. After round robin play concluded, the team tied for fourth place with a 7-4 record. They entered a tiebreaker with Nova Scotia's Heather Smith-Dacey. In spite of stealing two points in the tenth end, the team fell short losing the tiebreaker 8-9.

At the end of the 2010-2011 season Jeanna Schraeder left the team due to pregnancy. The team added Daliene Sivertson at third to replace Schraeder, however halfway through the season, Carter moved from throwing second stones to third stones, Sivertson moving to second stones, but still holding the broom. The move meant success and the team won the 2012 British Columbia Scotties Tournament of Hearts, barely defeating Marla Mallett in the final. At the 2012 Scotties Tournament of Hearts, the team finished round robin in second place with an 8-3 record. They faced Manitoba's Jennifer Jones in the 1-2 game, and defeated the team from Manitoba 7-5 receiving a bye to the final. The team met Alberta's Heather Nedohin in the final, and in a close game lost 6-7. Carter was again pregnant at the 2012 event.

At the end of the 2011-2012 season both Armstrong and Sivertson left the team. Scott and Carter welcomed back Jeanna Schraeder, and also added Sarah Wazney to the team. The team won another provincial title and won a bronze medal at the 2013 Scotties Tournament of Hearts.

=== 2020–present ===
On March 3, 2020, it was announced she and former teammates Jeanna Schraeder and Renee Simons would be skipped by five-time Scotties Champion Mary-Anne Arsenault for the 2020–21 season. The team played in one event during the abbreviated season, finishing runner-up at the Sunset Ranch Kelowna Double Cash to Team Corryn Brown. Due to the COVID-19 pandemic in British Columbia, the 2021 provincial championship was cancelled. As the reigning provincial champions, Team Brown was invited to represent British Columbia at the 2021 Scotties Tournament of Hearts, which they accepted, ending the season for Team Arsenault.

The next season, the team again reached the final of the Sunset Ranch Kelowna Double Cash, losing to the Kaila Buchy junior rink. They were able to compete in their provincial championship at the 2022 British Columbia Scotties Tournament of Hearts in Kamloops from January 5 to 9. After losing to Team Kayla MacMillan in both the A Final and 1 vs. 2 page playoff game, Team Arsenault defeated MacMillan 8–6 in the final to win the provincial championship. At the 2022 Scotties Tournament of Hearts, the team finished with a 3–5 round robin record, defeating Quebec, the Northwest Territories and the Yukon in their three victories.

== Personal life ==
Outside of curling, Carter works as Development Officer, Planned Giving, for the Okanagan College Foundation. She is a graduate of the University of Manitoba. She is married to Greg Carter and has two children.
