= 2005–06 curling season =

- Sport: Curling

Seasons
- ← 2004–05 2006–07 →

The 2005-06 curling season began in September 2005 and ended in April 2006.

== Season of Champions top three finishes ==
(Only team's skip listed)

Event	Winner	Runner-up	Third place
Canadian Mixed	Ontario (Epping)	Manitoba (Hamblin)	Quebec (Fowler)
Canadian Olympic Trials (men's)	Newfoundland and Labrador (Brad Gushue)	Manitoba (Jeff Stoughton)	Alberta (John Morris)
Canadian Olympic Trials (women's)	Alberta (Shannon Kleibrink)	British Columbia (Kelly Scott)	Saskatchewan (Stefanie Lawton)
Canadian Juniors (men's)	Alberta (Thomas)	British Columbia (Griffith)	Ontario (Maus)
Canadian Juniors (women's)	Saskatchewan (Selzer)	Manitoba (Neufeld)	Nova Scotia (Rhyno)
Olympics (men's)	Canada (Gushue)	Finland (Uusipaavalniemi)	United States (Fenson)
Olympics (women's)	Sweden (Norberg)	Switzerland (Ott)	Canada (Kleibrink)
Scott Tournament of Hearts	British Columbia (Scott)	Canada (J. Jones)	Nova Scotia (C. Jones)
Tim Hortons Brier	Quebec (Ménard)	Ontario (Howard)	Nova Scotia (Dacey)
World Junior Championships (men's)	Canada (Thomas)	Sweden (Carlsén)	Scotland (Gray)
World Junior Championships (women's)	Russia (Privivkova)	Canada (Selzer)	Denmark (Nielsen)
Canada Cup (men's)	Alberta (Kevin Martin)	Ontario (Glenn Howard)	Alberta (John Morris)
Canada Cup (women's)	Alberta (Cathy King)	Manitoba (Jennifer Jones)	Alberta (Renee Sonnenberg)
Canadian Seniors (men's)	Northern Ontario (Hackner)	Alberta (Rogers)	Saskatchewan (Hritzuk)
Canadian Seniors (women's)	Ontario (Dunn)	British Columbia (Adam)	Nova Scotia (LaRocque)
Women's World Championships	Sweden (Norberg)	United States (McCormick)	Canada (Scott)
Men's World Championships	Scotland (Murdoch)	Canada (Ménard)	Norway (Ulsrud)

== Other events ==
Event	Winner	Runner-up	Third place
European Mixed	Finland (Uusipaavalniemi)	Sweden (Edin)	Germany (Schöpp)
Pacific Championships (men's)	Australia (Millikin)	Japan (Ohmiya)	New Zealand (Becker)
Pacific Championships (women's)	Japan (Tsuchiya)	China (Wang B.)	South Korea (Kim J.S.)
European Championships (men's)	Norway (Trulsen)	Sweden (Lindholm)	Scotland (Murdoch)
European Championships (women's)	Sweden (Norberg)	Switzerland (Ott)	Denmark (Holm)
European Junior Challenge (men's)	Italy (da Rin)	Russia (Boldusev)	Czech Republic (Hurtik) and Germany Walter)
European Junior Challenge (women's)	Scotland (Barr)	Finland (Salonen)	Italy (Apollonio)
Pacific Juniors (men's)	China (Wang B.J.)	Japan (Morozumi)	South Korea (Kim C.M.)
Pacific Juniors (women's)	China (Wang B.)	Japan (Kobayashi)	South Korea (Kim J.S.)
World Seniors (men's)	Canada (Rogers)	United States (Simonson)	Sweden (Ullsten)
World Seniors (women's)	Sweden (Meldahl)	Canada (Potter)	Switzerland (Nedkoff)
Paralympics	Canada (Daw)	United Kingdom (Duffy)	Sweden (Jungnell)

== CCA ranking events ==
=== Men's ===
Event	Date	Location	Winning skip
RCMP Fall Open	September 21–25	Ottawa	Pierre Charette
2005 Manitoba Lotteries Wheat City Classic	September 22–25	Brandon, Manitoba	Jeff Stoughton
Shamrock Classic	September 22–25	Edmonton, Alberta	Rob Johnson
Shorty Jenkins Classic	September 22–25	Brockville, Ontario	Glenn Howard
Weber Oslo Cup	September 22–25	Oslo, Norway	Nils Carlsén* (Sweden)
Weston Fall Classic	September 26-October 2	Toronto	Wayne Middaugh
Appleton Rum CashSpiel	September 29-October 2	Sackville, Nova Scotia	Doug MacKenzie**
Twin Anchors Houseboats/Prestige Inns Curling Classic	September 29-October 3	Vernon, British Columbia	Bob Ursel
Asham Open	October 6–10	Winnipeg, Manitoba	Jeff Stoughton
Parliament Cup	October 6–10	Ottawa	Bryan Cochrane
Rock Curling Company Classic	October 7–9	Sudbury, Ontario	Chris Johnson**
Swiss Cup Basel	October 7–9	Basel, Switzerland	Randy Ferbey
Allied Windows - Westcoast Curling Classic	October 7–10	New Westminster, British Columbia	Kevin Martin
DirectWest Men's Curling Classic	October 7–10	Regina, Saskatchewan	Brad Heidt
Hotel Courtenay Bay– TSA Curling Classic	October 13–16	Saint John, New Brunswick	Jim Sullivan
Don Bartlett Curling Classic	October 13–16	Gander, Newfoundland and Labrador	Wayne Middaugh
Barrie Cashspiel	October 14–16	Barrie, Ontario	Kirk Ziola **
Meyers Norris Penny Charity Curling Classic	October 14–17	Medicine Hat, Alberta	John Morris
Arnprior Cashspiel	October 20–23	Arnprior, Ontario	Dave Murphy
Coupe Québec La Cage aux Sports	October 20–23	Quebec City	Jean-Michel Ménard
Bund Trophy	October 21–23	Bern, Switzerland	Mark Dacey
Guelph Co-operators Cashspiel	October 21–23	Guelph, Ontario	Phil Daniel
Denmar Energy Services Curling Classic	October 21–24	Bonnyville, Alberta	Randy Ferbey
Strauss Crown of Curling	October 21–24	Kamloops, British Columbia	Bert Gretzinger**
Brampton Bacardi Cashspiel	October 24–30	Brampton, Ontario	Dale Matchett
Meyers Norris Penny Prairie Classic	October 27–31	Portage la Prairie, Manitoba	Brad Heidt
Fredericton CWC Curling Classic	October 28–30	Fredericton, New Brunswick	Jim Sullivan
Labatt Classic	October 28–30	North Bay, Ontario	Willie Jeffries
Don's Drywall Rainbow Charity Classic	October 28–31	Lethbridge, Alberta	Rob Armitage
The National	November 2–6	Port Hawkesbury, Nova Scotia	Wayne Middaugh
Finale du circuit de curling du Québec	November 3–6	Saint-Romuald, Quebec	Francois Gagné
Rodd Curling Classic	November 3–6	Charlottetown, Prince Edward Island	Peter Gallant
Brantford Cashspiel	November 4–6	Brantford, Ontario	Kirk Ziola**
Money Concepts Rideau Skins	November 10–13	Ottawa	Willie Jeffries
New York Curling Open	November 10–13	Utica, New York	Mark Dacey
Sobeys Curling Classic	November 10–14	New Glasgow, Nova Scotia	Mike Kennedy**
Golden Horseshoe Curling Classic	November 11–13	Hamilton, Ontario	Greg Balsdon
Best Western Wayside Curling Classic	November 11–14	Lloydminster, Alberta	Mark Johnson
Whites Drug Store Classic	November 11–14	Swan River, Manitoba	Gerald Shymko
Nortel Mobility Open	November 18–20	Haileybury, Ontario	Jordan Chandler
Pharmasave Hampton Skins Classic	November 18–20	Hampton, New Brunswick	Paul Dobson**
Pike Lake Curling Classic	November 18–20	Harriston, Ontario	Greg Balsdon
Nipawin Evergreen Classic	November 18–21	Nipawin, Saskatchewan	Bruce Korte
Interlake Pharmacy Cashspiel	November 24–28	Stonewall, Manitoba	Howard Restall
Meyers Norris Penny Mens Cash Spiel	November 24–28	Red Deer, Alberta	Mark Johnson
Kelowna Men's Cashspiel	November 25–28	Kelowna, British Columbia	Bob Ursel
Painted Hand Casino Classic	November 25–28	Yorkton, Saskatchewan	Randy Ferbey
Brantford Nissan Classic	December 1–4	Brantford, Ontario	Peter Mellor**
Point Optical Charity Classic	December 1–4	Saskatoon, Saskatchewan	Glen Despins
Dauphin Clinic Pharmacy Cash Spiel	December 2–5	Dauphin, Manitoba	Ryan Fry
Canadian Olympic Curling Trials	December 3–11	Halifax, Nova Scotia	Brad Gushue
Christie's RV Curling Classic	December 9–11	Sault Ste. Marie, Ontario	Jordan Chandler
BDO Classic Canadian Open	January 5–8	Winnipeg, Manitoba	Jeff Stoughton
Manitoba Curling Tour Men's Championship	January 6–8	Swan River, Manitoba	Graham Freeman
Strauss Canada Cup	January 31-February 5	Kamloops, British Columbia	Kevin Martin
Quebec Men's Provincials	February 5–12	Sept-Îles, Quebec	Jean-Michel Ménard
Northern Ontario Men's Provincials	February 6–11	Nipigon, Ontario	Robbie Gordon
Ontario Men's Provincials	February 6–12	Guelph, Ontario	Glenn Howard
Newfoundland and Labrador Men's Provincials	February 7–12	St. John's, Newfoundland and Labrador	Ken Peddigrew**
Alberta Men's Provincials	February 8–12	Edmonton, Alberta	Kevin Martin
Manitoba Men's Provincials	February 8–12	Steinbach, Manitoba	Jeff Stoughton
New Brunswick Men's Provincials	February 8–12	Fredericton, New Brunswick	James Grattan
PEI Men's Provincials	February 8–12	Charlottetown, Prince Edward Island	Rod MacDonald
Saskatchewan Men's Provincials	February 8–12	Weyburn, Saskatchewan	Pat Simmons
Nova Scotia Men's Provincials	February 10–15	Liverpool, Nova Scotia	Mark Dacey
2006 Winter Olympics	February 11–23	Pinerolo, Italy	Brad Gushue
BC Men's Provincials	February 14–19	Chilliwack, British Columbia	Brian Windsor
Yukon/NWT Men's Provincials	February 16–19	Whitehorse, Yukon	Jamie Koe
Masters of Curling	February 23–26	St. John's, Newfoundland and Labrador	Randy Ferbey
Tim Hortons Brier	March 11–19	Regina, Saskatchewan	Jean-Michel Ménard
World Championship	April 1–11	Lowell, Massachusetts	David Murdoch* (Scotland)
Bear Mountain Arena Curling Classic	April 6–9	Victoria, British Columbia	Bob Ursel
Players' Championship	April 13–16	Calgary, Alberta	Randy Ferbey

=== Women's ===
Event	Date	Location	Winning skip
Shorty Jenkins Classic	September 22–25	Brockville, Ontario	Janet McGhee
Oslo Cup	September 22–25	Oslo, Norway	Sherry Middaugh
Weston Fall Classic	September 26-October 2	Toronto	Carrie Lindner
Twin Anchors Houseboats/Prestige Inns Curling Classic	September 29-October 2	Vernon, British Columbia	Cheryl Bernard
Casino Regina Women's Curling Classic	October 7–10	Regina, Saskatchewan	Karen Purdy
Trail Appliances Autumn Gold Curling Classic	October 7–10	Calgary, Alberta	Jenn Hanna
Meyers Norris Penny Charity Classic Cash Spiel	October 14–17	Medicine Hat, Alberta	Diane Foster
Southwestern Ontario Women's Charity Cashspiel	October 14–17	Ilderton, Ontario	Debbie McCormick* (United States)
Lady Monctonian Invitational Spiel	October 21–23	Moncton, New Brunswick	Jocelyn Palmer
Casinos of Winnipeg Women's Classic	October 21–24	Winnipeg, Manitoba	Jennifer Jones
Strauss Crown of Curling	October 21–24	Kelowna, British Columbia	Toni Wells**
Brampton Bacardi Cashspiel	October 24–30	Brampton, Ontario	Julie Hastings
Pot of Gold	October 28–30	Lethbridge, Alberta	Diane Foster
Park Town Ladies Curling Classic	October 28–31	Saskatoon, Saskatchewan	Stefanie Lawton
Rodd Curling Classic	November 3–6	Charlottetown, Prince Edward Island	Suzanne Gaudet
Community Savings Ladies Classic	November 4–7	Red Deer, Alberta	Cathy King
Money Concepts Rideau Skins	November 10–13	Ottawa	Jenn Hanna
Sobeys Curling Classic	November 10–14	New Glasgow, Nova Scotia	Heather Strong
Fredericton Women's Curling Classic	November 18–20	Fredericton, New Brunswick	Heidi Hanlon**
Granite Green & Gold	November 18–21	Edmonton, Alberta	Renee Sonnenberg
Nipawin Ladies Evergreen Classic	November 18–21	Nipawin, Saskatchewan	Jolene McIvor**
Wayden Transportation Ladies Classic	November 18–21	Abbotsford, British Columbia	Janet Harvey
Interlake Pharmacy Classic Cashspiel	November 24–28	Stonewall, Manitoba	Janet Harvey
SaskPower Schmirler Women's Charity Classic	November 25–28	Regina, Saskatchewan	Amber Holland
Canadian Olympic Curling Trials	December 3–11	Halifax, Nova Scotia	Shannon Kleibrink
Quebec Scott Tournament of Hearts	January 15–22	Quebec City	Ève Bélisle
PEI Scott Tournament of Hearts	January 19–22	O'Leary, Prince Edward Island	Suzanne Gaudet
Alberta Scott Tournament of Hearts	January 24–29	Edmonton, Alberta	Cathy King
BC Scott Tournament of Hearts	January 25–29	Williams Lake, British Columbia	Kelly Scott
Manitoba Scott Tournament of Hearts	January 25–29	Thompson, Manitoba	Jennifer Jones
New Brunswick Scott Tournament of Hearts	January 25–29	Moncton, New Brunswick	Andrea Kelly
Newfoundland and Labrador Scott Tournament of Hearts	January 25–29	Corner Brook, Newfoundland and Labrador	Heather Strong
Nova Scotia Scott Tournament of Hearts	January 25–29	St. Andrews, Nova Scotia	Colleen Jones**
NWT/Yukon Scott Tournament of Hearts	January 26–29	Yellowknife, Northwest Territories	Kerry Koe
Ontario Women's Provincials	January 29-February 4	Fort Frances, Ontario	Krista Scharf**
Sask Women's Provincials	February 1–5	Yorkton, Saskatchewan	Tracy Streifel
Strauss Canada Cup	January 31-February 5	Kamloops, British Columbia	Cathy King
2006 Winter Olympics	February 11–22	Pinerolo, Italy	Anette Norberg* (Sweden)
Scott Tournament of Hearts	February 25-March 5	London, Ontario	Kelly Scott
World Championship	March 18–26	Grande Prairie, Alberta	Anette Norberg* (Sweden)
Players' Championship	April 13–16	Calgary, Alberta	Jennifer Jones

*Non-Canadians who win events are not counted in the rankings. **Non eligible team

== WCT Money Ranking ==
#	Men's teams	$ (CAD)
1	Randy Ferbey	153,741
2	Kevin Martin	105,500
3	John Morris	76,500
4	Pat Simmons	66,700
5	Wayne Middaugh	63,000
6	Jeff Stoughton	61,000
7	Glenn Howard	56,783
8	Pierre Charette	48,725
9	Bob Ursel	42,500
10	Pat Ryan	32,731

== See also ==
- 2006-07 curling season

== Sources ==
- Canadian Curling Association
- World Curling Federation

Preceded by 2004–05	2005–06 curling season September 2005 – April 2006	Succeeded by 2006–07
