= 2007 World Women's Curling Championship =

- Host city: Aomori, Aomori, Japan
- Arena: Aomori Prefectural Skating Rink
- Dates: March 17–25, 2007
- Winner: Canada
- Curling club: Kelowna CC, Kelowna
- Skip: Kelly Scott
- Third: Jeanna Schraeder
- Second: Sasha Carter
- Lead: Renee Simons
- Alternate: Michelle Allen
- Coach: Gerry Richard
- Finalist: Denmark (Angelina Jensen)

The 2007 World Women's Curling Championship was held in Aomori, Aomori, Japan from March 17–25, 2007. It was the first world curling championship (men's or women's) to be held in Asia. Team Canada skipped by Kelly Scott won 8-4 over Denmark's Angelina Jensen in gold medal final.

== Teams ==
Canada	China	Czech Republic
Kelowna CC, Kelowna Skip: Kelly Scott; Third: Jeanna Schraeder; Second: Sasha Carter; Lead: Renee Simons; Alternate: Michelle Allen	Harbin CC, Harbin Fourth: Liu Yin; Skip: Wang Bingyu; Second: Yue Qingshuang; Lead: Zhou Yan; Alternate: Sun Yue	Savona Praha CC, Prague Skip: Hana Synáčková; Third: Lenka Danielisová; Second: Lenka Kučerová; Lead: Karolina Pilarova; Alternate: Michala Souhradová
Denmark	Germany	Italy
Tårnby CC, Tårnby Fourth: Madeleine Dupont; Third: Denise Dupont; Skip: Angelina Jensen; Lead: Camilla Jensen; Alternate: Ane Hansen	SC Riessersee, Garmisch-Partenkirchen Skip: Andrea Schöpp; Third: Monika Wagner; Second: Anna Hartelt; Lead: Marie Rotter; Alternate: Theresa Wallner	CC Olimpia Ladies, Cortina d'Ampezzo Skip: Diana Gaspari; Third: Giulia Lacedelli; Second: Giorgia Apollonio; Lead: Violetta Caldart; Alternate: Elettra De Col
Japan	Russia	Scotland
Aomori CC, Aomori Skip: Moe Meguro; Third: Mari Motohashi; Second: Mayo Yamaura; Lead: Sakurako Terada; Alternate: Asuka Yogo	Moskvitch CC, Moscow Skip: Ludmila Privivkova; Third: Olga Jarkova; Second: Nkeiruka Ezekh; Lead: Ekaterina Galkina; Alternate: Margarita Fomina	Dun CC, Montrose & Stirling Ice Rink Sports Club, Stirling Skip: Kelly Wood; Third: Jackie Lockhart; Second: Lorna Vevers; Lead: Lindsay Wood; Alternate: Karen Addison
Sweden	Switzerland	United States
Härnösands CK, Härnösand Skip: Anette Norberg; Third: Eva Lund; Second: Cathrine Lindahl; Lead: Anna Svärd; Alternate: Ulrika Bergman	Dübendorf CC, Dübendorf Skip: Silvana Tirinzoni; Third: Esther Neuenschwander; Second: Anna Neuenschwander; Lead: Sandra Attinger; Alternate: Mirjam Ott	Madison CC, Madison Skip: Debbie McCormick; Third: Allison Pottinger; Second: Nicole Joraanstad; Lead: Natalie Nicholson; Alternate: Maureen Brunt

== Round-robin standings ==
Country	Skip	W	L	PF	PA	Ends Won	Ends Lost	Blank Ends	Stolen Ends	Shot Pct.
Canada	Kelly Scott	10	1	85	37	52	31	11	23	82%
Denmark	Angelina Jensen	8	3	83	68	49	42	9	20	71%
Scotland	Kelly Wood	8	3	85	65	57	43	9	17	78%
United States	Debbie McCormick	7	4	79	71	50	44	8	16	76%
Switzerland	Silvana Tirinzoni	6	5	84	67	48	47	12	14	77%
Sweden	Anette Norberg	6	5	81	65	46	47	13	11	78%
China	Wang Bingyu	5	6	62	62	46	41	17	13	76%
Germany	Andrea Schöpp	4	7	54	79	42	51	12	16	71%
Japan	Moe Meguro	4	7	55	70	42	49	16	11	74%
Russia	Ludmila Privivkova	4	7	75	82	50	53	7	11	72%
Czech Republic*	Hana Synáčková	2	9	50	75	34	51	16	7	72%
Italy	Diana Gaspari	2	9	45	97	35	52	6	9	67%

*First Appearance

== Round-robin results ==
=== Draw 1 ===
March 17, 10:00

Sheet A	1	2	3	4	5	6	7	8	9	10	Final
United States (McCormick)	0	1	0	1	0	3	0	2	4	X	11
Denmark (Jensen) 🔨	2	0	2	0	1	0	1	0	0	X	6

Sheet B	1	2	3	4	5	6	7	8	9	10	Final
Switzerland (Tirinzoni) 🔨	0	0	0	1	0	1	0	2	0	0	4
Canada (Scott)	0	0	1	0	2	0	2	0	1	1	7

Sheet C	1	2	3	4	5	6	7	8	9	10	Final
Japan (Meguro) 🔨	0	0	0	1	0	2	0	1	2	1	7
Germany (Schöpp)	1	1	0	0	1	0	2	0	0	0	5

Sheet D	1	2	3	4	5	6	7	8	9	10	Final
China (Wang)	0	0	1	0	1	0	1	0	0	2	5
Russia (Privivkova) 🔨	0	0	0	0	0	2	0	1	1	0	4

=== Draw 2 ===
March 17, 15:00

Sheet A	1	2	3	4	5	6	7	8	9	10	Final
Germany (Schöpp)	0	0	0	0	0	0	1	0	X	X	1
Canada (Scott) 🔨	1	0	1	2	1	1	0	3	X	X	9

Sheet B	1	2	3	4	5	6	7	8	9	10	Final
Denmark (Jensen) 🔨	0	1	2	0	0	2	3	0	1	1	10
Russia (Privivkova)	3	0	0	1	0	0	0	1	0	0	5

Sheet C	1	2	3	4	5	6	7	8	9	10	Final
Czech Republic (Synáčková) 🔨	1	0	0	1	6	3	X	X	X	X	11
Italy (Gaspari)	0	0	1	0	0	0	X	X	X	X	1

Sheet D	1	2	3	4	5	6	7	8	9	10	Final
Scotland (Wood) 🔨	1	0	0	1	0	1	0	0	2	0	5
Sweden (Norberg)	0	2	1	0	1	0	0	2	0	1	7

=== Draw 3 ===
March 17, 20:00

Sheet A	1	2	3	4	5	6	7	8	9	10	11	Final
Scotland (Wood)	0	1	1	0	1	0	1	0	1	2	1	8
Switzerland (Tirinzoni) 🔨	2	0	0	2	0	2	0	1	0	0	0	7

Sheet B	1	2	3	4	5	6	7	8	9	10	Final
Italy (Gaspari)	0	2	1	1	0	1	0	1	0	0	6
United States (McCormick) 🔨	2	0	0	0	1	0	3	0	2	3	11

Sheet C	1	2	3	4	5	6	7	8	9	10	Final
Sweden (Norberg)	0	2	1	0	0	3	0	0	0	1	7
China (Wang) 🔨	0	0	0	2	2	0	1	0	1	0	6

Sheet D	1	2	3	4	5	6	7	8	9	10	Final
Czech Republic (Synáčková)	0	0	0	0	1	0	1	0	0	1	3
Japan (Meguro) 🔨	1	0	0	0	0	4	0	0	1	0	6

=== Draw 4 ===
March 18, 10:00

Sheet A	1	2	3	4	5	6	7	8	9	10	Final
Canada (Scott) 🔨	0	1	0	1	0	2	0	2	0	1	7
Sweden (Norberg)	0	0	1	0	2	0	1	0	1	0	5

Sheet B	1	2	3	4	5	6	7	8	9	10	Final
Denmark (Jensen) 🔨	1	0	2	0	1	0	1	3	X	X	8
Czech Republic (Synáčková)	0	0	0	0	0	0	0	0	X	X	0

Sheet C	1	2	3	4	5	6	7	8	9	10	11	Final
Russia (Privivkova) 🔨	2	0	1	0	0	1	0	2	0	2	0	8
Scotland (Wood)	0	2	0	1	1	0	2	0	2	0	1	9

Sheet D	1	2	3	4	5	6	7	8	9	10	Final
Germany (Schöpp) 🔨	1	1	1	0	1	0	1	1	1	0	7
Italy (Gaspari)	0	0	0	2	0	1	0	0	0	1	4

=== Draw 5 ===
March 18, 15:00

Sheet A	1	2	3	4	5	6	7	8	9	10	11	Final
Japan (Meguro) 🔨	1	0	1	0	1	0	1	2	0	0	0	6
Russia (Privivkova)	0	2	0	1	0	1	0	0	1	1	1	7

Sheet B	1	2	3	4	5	6	7	8	9	10	Final
China (Wang) 🔨	0	0	0	1	3	0	4	X	X	X	8
Germany (Schöpp)	0	0	0	0	0	1	0	X	X	X	1

Sheet C	1	2	3	4	5	6	7	8	9	10	Final
United States (McCormick) 🔨	0	1	0	1	0	0	1	0	1	X	4
Canada (Scott)	1	0	1	0	3	1	0	2	0	X	8

Sheet D	1	2	3	4	5	6	7	8	9	10	Final
Switzerland (Tirinzoni) 🔨	1	0	0	3	0	2	0	0	0	X	6
Denmark (Jensen)	0	1	2	0	2	0	1	0	4	X	10

=== Draw 6 ===
March 18, 20:00

Sheet A	1	2	3	4	5	6	7	8	9	10	Final
Italy (Gaspari) 🔨	2	0	1	1	0	1	0	0	0	0	5
China (Wang)	0	2	0	0	1	0	1	2	0	1	7

Sheet B	1	2	3	4	5	6	7	8	9	10	Final
Scotland (Wood) 🔨	1	0	0	4	0	0	0	1	3	X	9
Japan (Meguro)	0	0	1	0	2	0	0	0	0	X	3

Sheet C	1	2	3	4	5	6	7	8	9	10	Final
Czech Republic (Synáčková) 🔨	2	0	0	2	0	0	2	0	1	0	7
Switzerland (Tirinzoni)	0	1	1	0	3	2	0	3	0	1	11

Sheet D	1	2	3	4	5	6	7	8	9	10	Final
Sweden (Norberg) 🔨	0	0	2	0	2	1	0	0	2	X	7
United States (McCormick)	0	0	0	1	0	0	1	1	0	X	3

=== Draw 7 ===
March 19, 10:00

Sheet A	1	2	3	4	5	6	7	8	9	10	Final
Czech Republic (Synáčková)	0	0	1	0	3	0	0	0	0	0	4
United States (McCormick) 🔨	1	1	0	1	0	1	1	0	1	1	7

Sheet B	1	2	3	4	5	6	7	8	9	10	Final
Sweden (Norberg)	0	1	0	0	2	0	2	0	1	0	6
Switzerland (Tirinzoni) 🔨	0	0	2	1	0	0	0	1	0	4	8

Sheet C	1	2	3	4	5	6	7	8	9	10	Final
Italy (Gaspari)	1	0	0	1	0	0	1	0	1	1	5
Japan (Meguro) 🔨	0	1	1	0	1	2	0	1	0	0	6

Sheet D	1	2	3	4	5	6	7	8	9	10	Final
Scotland (Wood)	0	0	2	1	0	1	0	1	0	1	6
China (Wang) 🔨	0	2	0	0	1	0	1	0	1	0	5

=== Draw 8 ===
March 19, 15:00

Sheet A	1	2	3	4	5	6	7	8	9	10	Final
Denmark (Jensen)	0	0	0	2	2	0	4	0	0	1	9
Scotland (Wood) 🔨	0	1	1	0	0	1	0	2	1	0	6

Sheet B	1	2	3	4	5	6	7	8	9	10	Final
Canada (Scott) 🔨	2	1	0	1	3	2	X	X	X	X	9
Italy (Gaspari)	0	0	0	0	0	0	X	X	X	X	0

Sheet C	1	2	3	4	5	6	7	8	9	10	11	Final
Germany (Schöpp) 🔨	1	0	1	0	1	0	0	1	0	0	1	5
Sweden (Norberg)	0	0	0	1	0	1	1	0	0	1	0	4

Sheet D	1	2	3	4	5	6	7	8	9	10	Final
Russia (Privivkova) 🔨	0	2	0	1	0	1	2	0	0	2	8
Czech Republic (Synáčková)	1	0	1	0	1	0	0	2	1	0	6

=== Draw 9 ===
March 19, 20:00

Sheet A	1	2	3	4	5	6	7	8	9	10	Final
Switzerland (Tirinzoni) 🔨	0	0	3	0	0	0	2	1	1	1	8
Germany (Schöpp)	1	0	0	2	0	0	0	0	0	0	3

Sheet B	1	2	3	4	5	6	7	8	9	10	Final
United States (McCormick)	0	2	2	0	2	1	0	2	0	0	9
Russia (Privivkova) 🔨	1	0	0	2	0	0	1	0	1	1	5

Sheet C	1	2	3	4	5	6	7	8	9	10	Final
China (Wang)	0	1	2	1	0	0	1	0	0	1	6
Denmark (Jensen) 🔨	2	0	0	0	2	0	0	2	1	0	7

Sheet D	1	2	3	4	5	6	7	8	9	10	Final
Japan (Meguro) 🔨	0	0	1	0	0	1	0	1	0	X	3
Canada (Scott)	1	0	0	2	1	0	2	0	2	X	8

=== Draw 10 ===
March 20, 10:00

Sheet A	1	2	3	4	5	6	7	8	9	10	Final
China (Wang) 🔨	2	0	1	1	0	0	0	0	1	0	5
Canada (Scott)	0	2	0	0	0	0	1	2	0	1	6

Sheet B	1	2	3	4	5	6	7	8	9	10	Final
Japan (Meguro)	0	1	0	1	0	0	0	1	0	X	3
Denmark (Jensen) 🔨	1	0	1	0	1	2	1	0	2	X	8

Sheet C	1	2	3	4	5	6	7	8	9	10	Final
Switzerland (Tirinzoni)	0	1	0	1	0	2	0	2	0	0	6
Russia (Privivkova) 🔨	1	0	1	0	1	0	1	0	1	2	7

Sheet D	1	2	3	4	5	6	7	8	9	10	Final
United States (McCormick) 🔨	0	0	1	1	0	1	2	2	0	1	8
Germany (Schöpp)	3	2	0	0	2	0	0	0	0	0	7

=== Draw 11 ===
March 20, 15:00

Sheet A	1	2	3	4	5	6	7	8	9	10	Final
Sweden (Norberg) 🔨	1	0	3	0	0	3	0	0	2	1	10
Japan (Meguro)	0	2	0	1	1	0	1	1	0	0	6

Sheet B	1	2	3	4	5	6	7	8	9	10	Final
Czech Republic (Synáčková) 🔨	1	0	0	0	1	0	1	0	0	0	3
China (Wang)	0	2	0	1	0	1	0	1	1	1	7

Sheet C	1	2	3	4	5	6	7	8	9	10	Final
Scotland (Wood) 🔨	2	0	4	0	0	2	0	2	2	X	12
United States (McCormick)	0	2	0	2	1	0	1	0	0	X	6

Sheet D	1	2	3	4	5	6	7	8	9	10	Final
Italy (Gaspari) 🔨	1	0	0	1	0	0	0	X	X	X	2
Switzerland (Tirinzoni)	0	2	1	0	2	4	3	X	X	X	12

=== Draw 12 ===
March 20, 20:00

Sheet A	1	2	3	4	5	6	7	8	9	10	Final
Russia (Privivkova)	1	0	1	0	3	0	3	0	3	X	11
Italy (Gaspari) 🔨	0	0	0	1	0	1	0	2	0	X	4

Sheet B	1	2	3	4	5	6	7	8	9	10	Final
Germany (Schöpp)	0	1	0	0	1	1	0	1	0	X	4
Scotland (Wood) 🔨	2	0	3	1	0	0	2	0	1	X	9

Sheet C	1	2	3	4	5	6	7	8	9	10	Final
Canada (Scott) 🔨	0	0	2	0	2	3	1	X	X	X	8
Czech Republic (Synáčková)	0	0	0	2	0	0	0	X	X	X	2

Sheet D	1	2	3	4	5	6	7	8	9	10	Final
Denmark (Jensen)	1	2	0	2	3	0	0	1	0	0	9
Sweden (Norberg) 🔨	0	0	1	0	0	1	2	0	3	1	8

=== Draw 13 ===
March 21, 10:00

Sheet A	1	2	3	4	5	6	7	8	9	10	Final
Denmark (Jensen)	0	2	4	0	0	2	1	0	1	1	11
Germany (Schöpp) 🔨	2	0	0	1	3	0	0	1	0	0	7

Sheet B	1	2	3	4	5	6	7	8	9	10	Final
Russia (Privivkova) 🔨	1	0	0	3	0	0	0	1	0	X	5
Canada (Scott)	0	1	1	0	2	1	2	0	3	X	10

Sheet C	1	2	3	4	5	6	7	8	9	10	Final
Switzerland (Tirinzoni) 🔨	1	0	1	1	1	4	0	0	0	0	8
Japan (Meguro)	0	2	0	0	0	0	0	1	1	0	4

Sheet D	1	2	3	4	5	6	7	8	9	10	Final
China (Wang)	0	1	0	1	0	1	0	X	X	X	3
United States (McCormick) 🔨	2	0	1	0	2	0	5	X	X	X	10

=== Draw 14 ===
March 21, 15:00

Sheet B	1	2	3	4	5	6	7	8	9	10	Final
United States (McCormick)	0	1	0	1	0	2	1	1	0	3	9
Switzerland (Tirinzoni) 🔨	1	0	2	0	1	0	0	0	1	0	5

Sheet C	1	2	3	4	5	6	7	8	9	10	Final
Italy (Gaspari)	0	0	0	0	1	0	X	X	X	X	1
Sweden (Norberg) 🔨	0	4	2	3	0	3	X	X	X	X	12

Sheet D	1	2	3	4	5	6	7	8	9	10	Final
Czech Republic (Synáčková) 🔨	0	0	0	1	0	1	0	0	0	0	2
Scotland (Wood)	0	1	1	0	2	0	0	0	1	2	7

=== Draw 15 ===
March 21, 20:00

Sheet A	1	2	3	4	5	6	7	8	9	10	Final
Japan (Meguro) 🔨	0	1	1	0	0	1	0	0	1	0	4
China (Wang)	1	0	0	1	1	0	0	2	0	1	6

Sheet B	1	2	3	4	5	6	7	8	9	10	Final
Sweden (Norberg)	0	0	0	1	0	2	0	3	0	0	6
Czech Republic (Synáčková) 🔨	1	1	1	0	2	0	2	0	1	0	8

Sheet C	1	2	3	4	5	6	7	8	9	10	Final
Canada (Scott)	0	1	3	0	3	1	X	X	X	X	8
Denmark (Jensen) 🔨	0	0	0	1	0	0	X	X	X	X	1

Sheet D	1	2	3	4	5	6	7	8	9	10	Final
Germany (Schöpp) 🔨	2	0	1	2	0	0	1	0	0	2	8
Russia (Privivkova)	0	3	0	0	2	1	0	1	0	0	7

=== Draw 16 ===
March 22, 10:00

Sheet A	1	2	3	4	5	6	7	8	9	10	Final
Scotland (Wood)	0	2	0	0	2	2	0	1	0	0	7
Italy (Gaspari) 🔨	1	0	3	2	0	0	1	0	1	1	9

Sheet B	1	2	3	4	5	6	7	8	9	10	Final
Japan (Meguro) 🔨	0	0	1	0	1	0	0	2	3	X	7
United States (McCormick)	0	0	0	0	0	0	1	0	0	X	1

Sheet C	1	2	3	4	5	6	7	8	9	10	Final
Switzerland (Tirinzoni)	0	0	1	0	0	2	0	2	3	1	9
China (Wang) 🔨	0	2	0	0	1	0	2	0	0	0	5

=== Draw 17 ===
March 22, 15:00

Sheet A	1	2	3	4	5	6	7	8	9	10	Final
Germany (Schöpp)	1	0	1	1	1	0	1	0	0	1	6
Czech Republic (Synáčková) 🔨	0	1	0	0	0	1	0	1	1	0	4

Sheet B	1	2	3	4	5	6	7	8	9	10	Final
Russia (Privivkova)	0	1	0	1	0	2	0	2	1	0	7
Sweden (Norberg) 🔨	3	0	1	0	2	0	3	0	0	0	9

Sheet C	1	2	3	4	5	6	7	8	9	10	Final
Denmark (Jensen)	1	0	0	0	2	0	1	0	0	X	4
Italy (Gaspari) 🔨	0	1	0	2	0	1	0	2	2	X	8

Sheet D	1	2	3	4	5	6	7	8	9	10	Final
Canada (Scott)	0	2	2	0	1	0	0	0	0	0	5
Scotland (Wood) 🔨	1	0	0	1	0	1	1	1	1	1	7

== Playoffs ==
Page playoff system
1	Canada	11
2	Denmark	3
3	Scotland	11
4	United States	5

Semifinal
2	Denmark	9
3	Scotland	6

Final
1	Canada	8
2	Denmark	4

=== 1 vs. 2 game ===
March 24, 15:00

Sheet B	1	2	3	4	5	6	7	8	9	10	Final
Denmark (Jensen)	0	1	0	0	0	1	0	1	X	X	3
Canada (Scott) 🔨	1	0	2	2	1	0	5	0	X	X	11

Player Percentages
Canada		Denmark	
Renee Simons	77%	Ane Hansen	62%
Sasha Carter	83%	Angelina Jensen	70%
Jeanna Schraeder	77%	Denise Dupont	59%
Kelly Scott	77%	Madeleine Dupont	64%
Total	78%	Total	64%

=== 3 vs. 4 game ===
March 24, 20:00

Sheet B	1	2	3	4	5	6	7	8	9	10	Final
United States (McCormick)	0	0	0	1	0	2	0	2	0	X	5
Scotland (Wood) 🔨	0	1	4	0	2	0	1	0	3	X	11

Player Percentages
United States		Scotland	
Natalie Nicholson	90%	Lindsay Wood	87%
Nicole Joraanstad	97%	Lorna Vevers	82%
Allison Pottinger	74%	Jackie Lockhart	81%
Debbie McCormick	72%	Kelly Wood	89%
Total	83%	Total	84%

=== Semifinal ===
March 24, 20:00

Sheet B	1	2	3	4	5	6	7	8	9	10	Final
Denmark (Jensen)	0	1	0	0	1	0	2	2	1	2	9
Scotland (Wood) 🔨	1	0	3	1	0	1	0	0	0	0	6

Player Percentages
Denmark		Scotland	
Ane Hansen	50%	Lindsay Wood	83%
Angelina Jensen	58%	Lorna Vevers	63%
Denise Dupont	69%	Jackie Lockhart	69%
Madeleine Dupont	72%	Kelly Wood	70%
Total	62%	Total	71%

=== Gold-medal game ===
March 25, 14:00

Sheet B	1	2	3	4	5	6	7	8	9	10	Final
Canada (Scott) 🔨	2	0	1	0	1	1	2	0	1	X	8
Denmark (Jensen)	0	1	0	2	0	0	0	1	0	X	4

Player Percentages
Canada		Denmark	
Renee Simons	84%	Ane Hansen	86%
Sasha Carter	73%	Angelina Jensen	77%
Jeanna Schraeder	63%	Denise Dupont	72%
Kelly Scott	78%	Madeleine Dupont	71%
Total	75%	Total	76%

== Player percentages ==
Leads	%	Seconds	%	Thirds	%	Skips	%
(Sweden) Anna Svard	85	(Canada) Sasha Carter	83	(Canada) Jeanna Schraeder	84	(Canada) Kelly Scott	82
(Canada) Renee Simons	81	(Switzerland) Anna Neuenschwander	79	(Scotland) Jackie Lockhart	79	(Scotland) Kelly Wood	80
(Switzerland) Sandra Attinger	81	(China) Yue Qingshuang	78	(Sweden) Eva Lund	77	(Sweden) Anette Norberg	76
(United States) Natalie Nicholson	81	(Scotland) Lorna Vevers	77	(United States) Allison Pottinger	77	(China) Liu Yin	74
(China) Zhou Yan	80	(Sweden) Cathrine Lindahl	75	(China) Wang Bingyu	76	(Switzerland) Silvana Tirinzoni	74
