= Renee Simons =

Canadian curler (born 1972)

- Curler
- Born: Renee Lemke; April 18, 1972 (age 54); Oliver, British Columbia

Team
- Curling club: Kelowna CC, Kelowna, BC

Curling career
- Member Association: British Columbia
- Hearts: 5 (2005, 2006, 2007, 2008, 2022)
- World Championship: 2 (2006, 2007)
- Top CTRS ranking: 2nd (2004-05, 2005–06, 2006–07)
- Grand Slam victories: 2 (2006 Autumn Gold, 2007 Wayden Transportation Ladies Classic)
Medal record
Women's curling
Representing Canada
World Championships
| Gold medal – first place | 2007 Aomori |
| Bronze medal – third place | 2006 Grande Prairie |
Scotties Tournament of Hearts
| Gold medal – first place | 2007 Lethbridge |
Representing British Columbia
Scotties Tournament of Hearts
| Gold medal – first place | 2006 London |
| Bronze medal – third place | 2005 St. John's |
Canadian Olympic Curling Trials
| Silver medal – second place | 2005 Halifax |

Renee Simons (born April 18, 1972, in Oliver, British Columbia as Renee Lemke) is a Canadian curler from Kelowna. She is the former lead of Team Kelly Scott and currently plays lead on Team Mary-Anne Arsenault.

== Career ==
Playing lead for Kelly Scott, Simons won the 2006 Scott Tournament of Hearts, the 2007 Scotties Tournament of Hearts, a bronze medal at the 2006 Ford World Women's Curling Championship and a gold medal at the 2007 World Women's Curling Championship. She played lead for Scott from 2002 to 2009. The team also won two Grand Slam of Curling events and were the runner-ups at the 2005 Canadian Olympic Curling Trials to Shannon Kleibrink.

On March 3, 2020, it was announced she and former teammates Jeanna Schraeder and Sasha Carter would be skipped by five-time Scotties Champion Mary-Anne Arsenault for the 2020–21 season. The team played in one event during the abbreviated season, finishing runner-up at the Sunset Ranch Kelowna Double Cash to Team Corryn Brown. Due to the COVID-19 pandemic in British Columbia, the 2021 provincial championship was cancelled. As the reigning provincial champions, Team Brown was invited to represent British Columbia at the 2021 Scotties Tournament of Hearts, which they accepted, ending the season for Team Arsenault.

The next season, the team again reached the final of the Sunset Ranch Kelowna Double Cash, losing to the Kaila Buchy junior rink. They were able to compete in their provincial championship at the 2022 British Columbia Scotties Tournament of Hearts in Kamloops from January 5 to 9. After losing to Team Kayla MacMillan in both the A Final and 1 vs. 2 page playoff game, Team Arsenault defeated MacMillan 8–6 in the final to win the provincial championship. At the 2022 Scotties Tournament of Hearts, the team finished with a 3–5 round robin record, defeating Quebec, the Northwest Territories and the Yukon in their three victories.

Prior to joining the Scott team, Simons had been to one other national championship. In 1991, she played third for Allison MacInnes at the Canadian Junior Curling Championships.

== Personal life ==
She is married, and has two children. She is employed as a customer service manager and purchaser at ClearSolv Solvents Inc.
