= 2011 British Columbia Scotties Tournament of Hearts =

- Host city: Surrey, British Columbia
- Arena: Cloverdale Curling Club
- Dates: January 17–23
- Winner: Team Scott
- Curling club: Kelowna CC, Kelowna
- Skip: Kelly Scott
- Third: Jeanna Schraeder
- Second: Sasha Carter
- Lead: Jacquie Armstrong
- Finalist: Kelley Law

The 2011 British Columbia Scotties Tournament of Hearts presented by Best Western, the provincial women's curling championship for British Columbia, was held January 17 to 23 at the Cloverdale Curling Club in Surrey, British Columbia. The winning Kelly Scott rink represented team British Columbia at the 2011 Scotties Tournament of Hearts in Charlottetown, Prince Edward Island where they finished 7-4 in round robin play, losing in a tiebreaker game against Nova Scotia.

== Qualification process ==
Curl BC announced that for the 2011 provincials, the defending champion along with the top British Columbia team in the CTRS rankings as of December 1st each season would automatically qualify for provincials.

Qualification method	Berths	Qualifying team(s)
2010 Provincial champion	1	Kelly Scott
CTRS Leader	1	Kelley Law
Coastal Qualifier #1	2	Roselyn Craig; Kristy Lewis
Coastal Qualifier #2	2	Nicole Backe; Adina Tasaka
Interior Qualifier #1	2	Jen Fewster; Jill Winters
Interior Qualifier #2	2	Patti Knezevic; Karla Thompson

== Teams ==
The teams are listed as follows:

Skip	Third	Second	Lead	Club(s)
Nicole Backe	Shannon Gallaugher	Gloria Palinkas	Barbara Zbeetnoff	Nanaimo CC, Nanaimo
Kristen Fewester (Fourth)	Jen Fewster (Skip)	Blaine Richards	Amber Cheveldave	Prince George CC, Prince George
Patti Knezevic	Brenda Garvey	Chelan Cotter	Rhonda Camozzi	Prince George CC, Prince George
Kelley Law	Jody Maskiewich	Shannon Aleksic	Kristen Recksiedler	Royal City CC, New Westminster
Kristy Lewis	Marilou Richter	Michelle Ramsay	Sandra Comadina	Richmond CC, Richmond
Kelly Scott	Jeanna Schraeder	Sasha Carter	Jacquie Armstrong	Kelowna CC, Kelowna
Adina Tasaka	Darah Provencal	Heather Beatty	Jennifer Armstrong	Royal City CC, New Westminster
Karla Thompson	Steph Jackson	Kristen Windsor	Kristen Fox	Kamloops CC, Kamloops
Sarah Wark (Fourth)	Michelle Allen	Roselyn Craig (Skip)	Megan Reid	Duncan CC, Duncan
Jill Winters	Samantha Almquist	Natalie Nowicki	Heather Nichol	Nelson CC, Nelson

== Round robin standings ==
Final Round Robin standings

Key
Teams to Playoffs
Teams to Tiebreaker

Skip	W	L	W–L	PF	PA	EW	EL	BE	SE
Kelley Law	8	1	–	66	36	39	26	13	14
Kelly Scott	7	2	–	60	48	34	36	18	7
Roselyn Craig	6	3	–	52	46	37	33	11	8
Adina Tasaka	5	4	1–0	49	53	36	39	11	7
Kristy Lewis	5	4	0–1	67	52	42	35	7	11
Karla Thompson	4	5	–	52	55	34	34	9	7
Patti Knezevic	3	6	2–0	46	57	32	41	11	2
Nicole Backe	3	6	1–1	62	56	38	38	12	11
Jen Fewster	3	6	0–2	46	51	33	35	13	11
Jill Winters	1	8	–	40	76	29	38	3	7

== Round robin results ==
All draw times listed in Pacific Time (UTC−08:00).

=== Draw 1 ===
Monday, January 17, 12:00 pm

Sheet A	1	2	3	4	5	6	7	8	9	10	Final
Kelly Scott	1	0	2	0	0	0	0	4	0	X	7
Patti Knezevic	0	1	0	0	0	0	1	0	1	X	3

Sheet B	1	2	3	4	5	6	7	8	9	10	Final
Kristy Lewis	0	0	2	0	0	4	5	2	X	X	13
Jill Winters	1	1	0	0	1	0	0	0	X	X	3

Sheet C	1	2	3	4	5	6	7	8	9	10	Final
Adina Tasaka	0	0	1	0	1	0	0	0	3	1	8
Karla Thompson	1	1	0	1	0	0	0	1	0	0	4

Sheet D	1	2	3	4	5	6	7	8	9	10	Final
Roselyn Craig	0	2	0	1	0	0	0	3	0	X	6
Jen Fewster	1	0	1	0	0	0	0	0	1	X	4

Sheet E	1	2	3	4	5	6	7	8	9	10	Final
Nicole Backe	0	0	0	2	0	2	0	2	0	0	6
Kelley Law	0	0	0	0	2	0	4	0	0	2	8

=== Draw 2 ===
Monday, January 17, 7:30 pm

Sheet A	1	2	3	4	5	6	7	8	9	10	Final
Roselyn Craig	0	1	0	2	0	1	0	2	1	X	7
Kristy Lewis	1	0	1	0	2	0	1	0	0	X	5

Sheet B	1	2	3	4	5	6	7	8	9	10	Final
Kelly Scott	0	0	1	0	2	0	0	4	0	X	7
Karla Thompson	0	1	0	1	0	0	1	0	0	X	4

Sheet C	1	2	3	4	5	6	7	8	9	10	Final
Patti Knezevic	0	0	1	0	2	0	0	3	0	1	7
Nicole Backe	1	0	0	1	0	2	1	0	0	0	5

Sheet D	1	2	3	4	5	6	7	8	9	10	Final
Adina Tasaka	1	0	0	1	0	0	0	1	0	X	3
Kelley Law	0	2	1	0	1	1	1	0	2	X	8

Sheet E	1	2	3	4	5	6	7	8	9	10	Final
Jen Fewster	3	1	4	0	2	X	X	X	X	X	10
Jill Winters	0	0	0	2	0	X	X	X	X	X	2

=== Draw 3 ===
Tuesday, January 18, 12:00 pm

Sheet A	1	2	3	4	5	6	7	8	9	10	Final
Jill Winters	0	1	0	1	0	1	3	2	X	X	8
Adina Tasaka	1	0	1	0	1	0	0	0	X	X	3

Sheet B	1	2	3	4	5	6	7	8	9	10	Final
Nicole Backe	4	1	0	0	3	1	0	1	X	X	10
Jen Fewster	0	0	2	1	0	0	1	0	X	X	4

Sheet C	1	2	3	4	5	6	7	8	9	10	Final
Law	0	1	0	0	3	0	0	5	X	X	9
Kelly Scott	0	0	1	0	0	1	1	0	X	X	3

Sheet D	1	2	3	4	5	6	7	8	9	10	Final
Kristy Lewis	0	1	0	2	0	1	0	0	2	X	6
Patti Knezevic	1	0	1	0	1	0	0	1	0	X	4

Sheet E	1	2	3	4	5	6	7	8	9	10	Final
Karla Thompson	0	0	0	0	2	0	2	0	X	X	4
Roselyn Craig	1	0	0	3	0	2	0	4	X	X	10

=== Draw 4 ===
Tuesday, January 18, 7:00 pm

Sheet A	1	2	3	4	5	6	7	8	9	10	11	Final
Nicole Backe	0	0	1	3	0	0	1	0	0	1	0	6
Kelly Scott	0	2	0	0	0	1	0	3	0	0	2	8

Sheet B	1	2	3	4	5	6	7	8	9	10	Final
Adina Tasaka	0	1	0	1	1	0	3	0	1	X	7
Kristy Lewis	1	0	1	0	0	1	0	1	0	X	4

Sheet C	1	2	3	4	5	6	7	8	9	10	Final
Jill Winters	1	0	0	0	0	2	1	0	X	X	4
Roselyn Craig	0	3	1	1	3	0	0	2	X	X	10

Sheet D	1	2	3	4	5	6	7	8	9	10	Final
Jen Fewster	0	1	0	0	1	1	0	2	0	X	5
Karla Thompson	0	0	0	1	0	0	1	0	1	X	3

Sheet E	1	2	3	4	5	6	7	8	9	10	Final
Kelley Law	0	1	0	2	0	0	1	2	0	X	6
Patti Knezevic	0	0	1	0	1	0	0	0	2	X	4

=== Draw 5 ===
Wednesday, January 19, 12:00 pm

Sheet A	1	2	3	4	5	6	7	8	9	10	Final
Kelley Law	1	0	0	0	1	0	1	0	2	1	6
Roselyn Craig	0	0	0	1	0	1	0	1	0	0	3

Sheet B	1	2	3	4	5	6	7	8	9	10	Final
Karla Thompson	2	0	2	1	1	2	X	X	X	X	8
Patti Knezevic	0	1	0	0	0	0	X	X	X	X	1

Sheet C	1	2	3	4	5	6	7	8	9	10	Final
Lewis	0	1	0	3	0	0	1	0	2	2	9
Jen Fewster	0	0	2	0	0	3	0	1	0	0	6

Sheet D	1	2	3	4	5	6	7	8	9	10	Final
Jill Winters	2	0	0	0	1	1	0	2	0	X	6
Kelly Scott	0	1	2	0	0	0	3	0	2	X	8

Sheet E	1	2	3	4	5	6	7	8	9	10	Final
Adina Tasaka	0	0	0	0	2	2	0	1	0	1	6
Nicole Backe	0	0	1	1	0	0	1	0	2	0	5

=== Draw 6 ===
Wednesday, January 19, 7:00 pm

Sheet A	1	2	3	4	5	6	7	8	9	10	Final
Adina Tasaka	0	2	0	0	0	1	0	1	0	0	4
Jen Fewster	0	0	0	1	2	0	1	0	0	1	5

Sheet B	1	2	3	4	5	6	7	8	9	10	Final
Jill Winters	0	0	0	1	0	X	X	X	X	X	1
Kelley Law	1	2	2	0	3	X	X	X	X	X	8

Sheet C	1	2	3	4	5	6	7	8	9	10	Final
Craig	0	1	1	0	1	0	1	0	1	1	6
Patti Knezevic	1	0	0	2	0	2	0	0	0	0	5

Sheet D	1	2	3	4	5	6	7	8	9	10	Final
Karla Thompson	1	0	1	1	0	1	0	0	1	2	7
Nicole Backe	0	2	0	0	2	0	1	0	0	0	5

Sheet E	1	2	3	4	5	6	7	8	9	10	11	Final
Kelly Scott	0	1	0	0	0	3	1	0	0	2	1	8
Kristy Lewis	0	0	1	0	2	0	0	3	1	0	0	7

=== Draw 7 ===
Thursday, January 20, 12:00 pm

Sheet A	1	2	3	4	5	6	7	8	9	10	Final
Karla Thompson	0	1	2	0	2	0	0	4	X	X	9
Jill Winters	1	0	0	1	0	0	1	0	X	X	3

Sheet B	1	2	3	4	5	6	7	8	9	10	Final
Roselyn Craig	0	1	0	1	0	1	0	1	0	X	7
Nicole Backe	1	0	2	0	1	0	2	0	1	X	4

Sheet C	1	2	3	4	5	6	7	8	9	10	Final
Kelly Scott	0	0	1	0	1	0	1	0	2	0	5
Adina Tasaka	0	0	0	1	0	3	0	1	0	1	6

Sheet D	1	2	3	4	5	6	7	8	9	10	Final
Kelley Law	0	0	2	0	1	0	1	1	0	0	5
Kristy Lewis	0	2	0	2	0	2	0	0	1	2	9

Sheet E	1	2	3	4	5	6	7	8	9	10	Final
Patti Knezevic	1	0	0	1	0	1	0	1	0	4	8
Jen Fewster	0	1	1	0	2	0	0	0	1	0	5

=== Draw 8 ===
Thursday, January 20, 7:00 pm

Sheet A	1	2	3	4	5	6	7	8	9	10	Final
Kristy Lewis	1	1	0	2	2	0	1	0	0	1	8
Nicole Backe	0	0	2	0	0	2	0	2	1	0	7

Sheet B	1	2	3	4	5	6	7	8	9	10	11	Final
Jen Fewster	1	1	0	1	0	1	1	0	0	1	0	6
Kelly Scott	0	0	2	0	1	0	0	3	0	0	2	8

Sheet C	1	2	3	4	5	6	7	8	9	10	Final
Karla Thompson	1	1	0	0	1	0	0	1	X	X	4
Kelley Law	0	0	4	1	0	1	3	0	X	X	9

Sheet D	1	2	3	4	5	6	7	8	9	10	Final
Patti Knezevic	1	0	0	1	0	2	0	2	0	2	8
Jill Winters	0	1	1	0	2	0	1	0	2	0	7

Sheet E	1	2	3	4	5	6	7	8	9	10	Final
Roselyn Craig	1	0	2	0	0	0	3	0	3	X	9
Adina Tasaka	0	2	0	0	0	2	0	1	0	X	5

=== Draw 9 ===
Friday, January 21, 9:30 am

Sheet A	1	2	3	4	5	6	7	8	9	10	Final
Jen Fewster	0	2	0	0	0	2	0	0	0	X	4
Kelley Law	0	0	1	1	3	0	1	1	0	X	7

Sheet B	1	2	3	4	5	6	7	8	9	10	11	Final
Patti Knezevic	0	0	1	0	1	0	3	1	0	0	0	6
Adina Tasaka	1	1	0	2	0	1	0	0	0	1	3	9

Sheet C	1	2	3	4	5	6	7	8	9	10	Final
Nicole Backe	0	1	3	2	0	1	1	0	3	X	11
Jill Winters	1	0	0	0	3	0	0	2	0	X	6

Sheet D	1	2	3	4	5	6	7	8	9	10	Final
Kelly Scott	1	0	1	0	0	0	2	2	0	X	6
Roselyn Craig	0	1	0	0	1	0	0	0	1	X	3

Sheet E	1	2	3	4	5	6	7	8	9	10	Final
Kristy Lewis	0	1	1	0	2	1	1	0	1	0	7
Karla Thompson	1	0	0	3	0	0	0	2	0	3	9

== Tiebreaker ==
Friday, January 21, 2:30 pm

Sheet A	1	2	3	4	5	6	7	8	9	10	Final
Adina Tasaka	0	0	1	0	0	3	0	0	1	X	5
Kristy Lewis	0	1	0	2	0	0	2	1	0	X	6

== Playoffs ==
Page playoff system
1	Kelley Law	9
2	Kelly Scott	2
3	Roselyn Craig	7
4	Kristy Lewis	6

Semifinal
2	Kelly Scott	7
3	Roselyn Craig	4

Final
1	Kelley Law	3
2	Kelly Scott	5

=== 1 vs. 2 ===
Friday, January 21, 7:00 pm

Sheet B	1	2	3	4	5	6	7	8	9	10	Final
Kelley Law	0	0	3	0	3	0	3	X	X	X	9
Kelly Scott	0	0	0	1	0	1	0	X	X	X	2

=== 3 vs. 4 ===
Saturday, January 22, 10:00 am

Sheet B	1	2	3	4	5	6	7	8	9	10	Final
Roselyn Craig	1	1	0	1	0	0	0	3	0	1	7
Kristy Lewis	0	0	2	0	0	1	1	0	2	0	6

=== Semifinal ===
Saturday, January 22, 6:00 pm

Sheet B	1	2	3	4	5	6	7	8	9	10	Final
Kelly Scott	1	0	0	0	0	2	0	2	0	2	7
Roselyn Craig	0	0	0	1	1	0	2	0	0	0	4

=== Final ===
Sunday, January 23, 2:00 pm

Sheet B	1	2	3	4	5	6	7	8	9	10	Final
Kelley Law	0	1	0	1	0	0	1	0	0	0	3
Kelly Scott	0	0	1	0	0	2	0	1	0	1	5

2010 British Columbia Scott Tournament of Hearts

Kelly Scott
4th British Columbia Provincial Championship title
