= Idske de Jong =

Dutch curler

Idske de Jong (born 18 August 1984) is a Dutch curler from the Curling Club Motip Dubli. She used to play for Shari Leibbrandt-Demmon's team. The team, with de Jong at that time as the alternate, finished in 7th place at the 2005 European Curling Championships, which qualified them for the 2006 Ford World Women's Curling Championship where they finished in last position. She participated in the 2006 European Curling Championships.
