= 2006 Scott Tournament of Hearts =

- Host city: London, Ontario
- Arena: John Labatt Centre
- Dates: February 25 - March 5
- Attendance: 105,065
- Winner: British Columbia
- Curling club: Kelowna CC, Kelowna
- Skip: Kelly Scott
- Third: Jeanna Schraeder
- Second: Sasha Carter
- Lead: Renee Simons
- Alternate: Michelle Allen
- Coach: Gerry Richard
- Finalist: Canada (Jennifer Jones)

The 2006 Scott Tournament of Hearts, the Canadian women's curling championship, was held at the John Labatt Centre in London, Ontario, February 25, 2006 – March 6, 2006. The tournament consisted of 12 teams, one from each of Canada's provinces, one from Canada's territories and the defending champion, whose team is known as Team Canada. The tournament was the 25th anniversary of the Hearts. The winner would be Kelly Scott's British Columbia rink who defeated the defending champions, Jennifer Jones in the final.

== Teams ==
Representing Team Canada was the defending champion, Jennifer Jones rink but with a change at lead position with 2002 Olympic bronze medallist Georgina Wheatcroft. Making her 20th appearance at the Scotts was Colleen Jones who skipped the Nova Scotia team. Colleen Jones had won the Scotts six times. 1998 Champion Cathy King skipped Team Alberta. Making her fourth appearance at the Scotts was Suzanne Gaudet from Prince Edward Island, a two time Canadian Junior Champion and 2001 World Junior Champion. Making her first appearance at the Scotts was Andrea Kelly from New Brunswick, the 2005 Canadian Junior Champion. Returning from 2005 was the Northwest Territories/Yukon team skipped by Kerry Koe- Koe made her fourth appearance at the Scotts. Also returning was Kelly Scott, from British Columbia, the 1995 World Junior Champion who made her second appearance. Another skip returning from 2005 was Heather Strong from Newfoundland and Labrador who made her sixth appearance. Making an appearance at the Scotts for the first time since 1997 was Janet Harvey of Manitoba, attending her third event. Debuting at the Scotts, along with Kelly from New Brunswick was Eve Bélisle from Quebec, Krista Scharf from Ontario and Tracy Streifel from Saskatchewan.

The teams were listed as follows:

Team Canada	Alberta	British Columbia
St. Vital CC, Winnipeg Skip: Jennifer Jones; Third: Cathy Overton-Clapham; Second: Jill Officer; Lead: Georgina Wheatcroft; Alternate: Janet Arnott	Saville Centre CC, Edmonton Skip: Cathy King; Third: Lori Armistead; Second: Raylene Rocque; Lead: Tracy Bush; Alternate: Beth Iskiw	Kelowna CC, Kelowna Skip: Kelly Scott; Third: Jeanna Schraeder; Second: Sasha Carter; Lead: Renee Simons; Alternate: Michelle Allen
Manitoba	New Brunswick	Newfoundland and Labrador
Fort Rouge CC, Winnipeg Skip: Janet Harvey; Third: Jill Thurston; Second: Cherie-Ann Loder; Lead: Carey Burgess; Alternate: Alison Harvey	Capital WC, Fredericton Skip: Andrea Kelly; Third: Kristen MacDiarmid; Second: Jodie deSolla; Lead: Morgan Muise; Alternate: Lianne Sobey	St. John's CC, St. John's Skip: Heather Strong; Third: Shelley Nichols; Second: Laura Strong; Lead: Susan O'Leary; Alternate: Cathy Cunningham
Nova Scotia	Ontario	Prince Edward Island
Mayflower CC, Halifax Skip: Colleen Jones; Third: Kim Kelly; Second: Mary-Anne Arsenault (Note: During Draw 13, Team Nova Scotia second Mary-Anne Arsenault suffered an allergic reaction and had to be rushed to the hospital shortly after the fifth end. Alternate Mary Sue Radford threw second stones during the sixth end, then moved to lead for the remainder of the game while lead Nancy Delahunt threw second stones. Arsenault returned to action for Draw 14.); Lead: Nancy Delahunt; Alternate: Mary Sue Radford	Fort William CC, Thunder Bay Skip: Krista Scharf; Third: Tara George; Second: Tiffany Stubbings; Lead: Lorraine Lang (Note: Team Ontario alternate Michelle Boland threw lead stones in Draw 14.); Alternate: Michelle Boland	Charlottetown CC Charlottetown Skip: Suzanne Gaudet; Third: Susan McInnis (Note: Team Prince Edward Island alternate Shelly Bradley threw third stones in Draw 16.); Second: Nancy Cameron; Lead: Tricia Affleck; Alternate: Shelly Bradley
Quebec	Saskatchewan	Northwest Territories/Yukon
Lachine CC, Lachine; CC Longue Pointe, Montreal Skip: Ève Bélisle; Third: Pamela Nugent; Second: Martine Comeau; Lead: Saskia Hollands; Alternate: Marie-France Larouche	Granite CC, Saskatoon Skip: Tracy Streifel; Third: Ros Tanner; Second: Kristen Ridalls; Lead: Andrea Rudulier; Alternate: Amber Holland	Yellowknife CC, Yellowknife Fourth: Monique Gagnier; Skip: Kerry Koe; Second: Kelli Turpin; Lead: Heather McCagg-Nystrom; Alternate: Lisa Freeman

== Map of teams ==
Team Canada Provincial Winners

== Standings ==
Final round robin standings

Key
Teams to Playoffs
Teams to Tiebreaker

Locale	Skip	W	L	W–L	PF	PA	EW	EL	BE	SE	S%
British Columbia	Kelly Scott	9	2	–	79	55	48	42	12	9	82%
Nova Scotia	Colleen Jones	8	3	1–0	74	57	55	41	10	22	80%
Canada	Jennifer Jones	8	3	0–1	82	70	52	48	7	13	77%
Quebec	Eve Bélisle	7	4	1–0	81	71	49	48	9	10	74%
Newfoundland and Labrador	Heather Strong	7	4	0–1	79	75	50	44	10	12	75%
Alberta	Cathy King	6	5	–	70	58	49	39	8	21	77%
New Brunswick	Andrea Kelly	5	6	–	74	74	49	49	10	11	75%
Manitoba	Janet Harvey	4	7	2–0	69	77	47	48	8	12	74%
Prince Edward Island	Suzanne Gaudet	4	7	1–1	58	75	40	49	9	12	72%
Ontario	Krista Scharf	4	7	0–2	74	89	43	52	13	10	71%
Northwest Territories/Yukon	Kerry Koe	2	9	1–0	65	86	43	57	3	7	70%
Saskatchewan	Tracy Streifel	2	9	0–1	60	88	45	53	9	9	73%

== Results ==
All draw times are listed in Eastern Time (UTC−05:00).

=== Draw 1 ===
Saturday, February 25, 2:30 pm

Sheet A	1	2	3	4	5	6	7	8	9	10	11	Final
Ontario (Scharf) 🔨	0	4	0	1	0	0	0	1	3	0	4	13
Northwest Territories/Yukon (Koe)	0	0	2	0	1	3	2	0	0	1	0	9

Sheet B	1	2	3	4	5	6	7	8	9	10	Final
New Brunswick (Kelly)	0	0	1	4	0	0	4	X	X	X	9
Prince Edward Island (Gaudet) 🔨	0	1	0	0	1	1	0	X	X	X	3

Sheet C	1	2	3	4	5	6	7	8	9	10	11	Final
British Columbia (Scott) 🔨	0	0	1	0	1	0	2	0	1	0	0	5
Saskatchewan (Streifel)	0	0	0	1	0	2	0	1	0	1	1	6

Sheet D	1	2	3	4	5	6	7	8	9	10	Final
Nova Scotia (C. Jones) 🔨	1	0	1	0	2	1	2	0	1	X	8
Alberta (King)	0	1	0	0	0	0	0	1	0	X	2

=== Draw 2 ===
Saturday, February 25, 7:00 pm

Sheet A	1	2	3	4	5	6	7	8	9	10	Final
Saskatchewan (Streifel) 🔨	2	0	0	1	0	0	2	0	2	0	7
New Brunswick (Kelly)	0	2	2	0	2	1	0	1	0	1	9

Sheet B	1	2	3	4	5	6	7	8	9	10	Final
Quebec (Bélisle)	0	0	3	3	0	0	1	1	1	X	9
Newfoundland and Labrador (Strong) 🔨	0	2	0	0	1	1	0	0	0	X	4

Sheet C	1	2	3	4	5	6	7	8	9	10	Final
Canada (J. Jones) 🔨	1	0	1	0	0	3	0	1	0	2	8
Manitoba (Harvey)	0	1	0	2	2	0	1	0	1	0	7

Sheet D	1	2	3	4	5	6	7	8	9	10	Final
British Columbia (Scott) 🔨	2	0	0	1	0	0	2	1	0	X	6
Prince Edward Island (Gaudet)	0	1	0	0	0	1	0	0	1	X	3

=== Draw 3 ===
Sunday, February 26, 10:00 am

Sheet B	1	2	3	4	5	6	7	8	9	10	Final
Alberta (King) 🔨	2	0	2	0	1	2	3	X	X	X	10
Ontario (Scharf)	0	0	0	2	0	0	0	X	X	X	2

Sheet C	1	2	3	4	5	6	7	8	9	10	Final
Nova Scotia (C. Jones) 🔨	1	0	2	1	1	0	1	2	0	X	8
Northwest Territories/Yukon (Koe)	0	1	0	0	0	2	0	0	1	X	4

=== Draw 4 ===
Sunday, February 26, 2:30 pm

Sheet A	1	2	3	4	5	6	7	8	9	10	Final
Newfoundland and Labrador (Strong) 🔨	1	0	1	0	0	4	0	3	X	X	9
Canada (J. Jones)	0	1	0	1	0	0	1	0	X	X	3

Sheet B	1	2	3	4	5	6	7	8	9	10	Final
Prince Edward Island (Gaudet) 🔨	3	0	1	0	1	0	2	0	2	2	11
Saskatchewan (Streifel)	0	1	0	2	0	2	0	1	0	0	6

Sheet C	1	2	3	4	5	6	7	8	9	10	Final
New Brunswick (Kelly) 🔨	1	0	0	0	0	1	0	0	1	1	4
British Columbia (Scott)	0	1	0	1	2	0	0	1	0	0	5

Sheet D	1	2	3	4	5	6	7	8	9	10	Final
Quebec (Bélisle) 🔨	1	0	1	0	2	0	1	0	2	1	8
Manitoba (Harvey)	0	1	0	2	0	1	0	3	0	0	7

=== Draw 5 ===
Sunday, February 26, 7:00 pm

Sheet A	1	2	3	4	5	6	7	8	9	10	Final
Northwest Territories/Yukon (Koe) 🔨	0	0	0	1	0	2	0	1	0	X	4
Alberta (King)	2	1	1	0	1	0	1	0	1	X	7

Sheet B	1	2	3	4	5	6	7	8	9	10	Final
Canada (J. Jones) 🔨	1	0	1	0	2	0	1	0	0	1	6
Quebec (Bélisle)	0	2	0	0	0	2	0	0	1	0	5

Sheet C	1	2	3	4	5	6	7	8	9	10	Final
Manitoba (Harvey) 🔨	2	0	0	2	0	2	0	0	2	0	8
Newfoundland and Labrador (Strong)	0	0	1	0	1	0	2	1	0	1	6

Sheet D	1	2	3	4	5	6	7	8	9	10	11	Final
Ontario (Scharf) 🔨	0	1	0	3	0	2	0	0	1	0	0	7
Nova Scotia (C. Jones)	0	0	1	0	1	0	2	1	0	2	1	8

=== Draw 6 ===
Monday, February 27, 9:30 am

Sheet A	1	2	3	4	5	6	7	8	9	10	Final
Nova Scotia (C. Jones) 🔨	1	0	0	2	0	2	0	0	1	0	6
British Columbia (Scott)	0	1	0	0	2	0	1	1	0	2	7

Sheet B	1	2	3	4	5	6	7	8	9	10	Final
Alberta (King) 🔨	0	1	0	1	0	3	0	0	1	0	6
New Brunswick (Kelly)	1	0	1	0	2	0	1	1	0	1	7

Sheet C	1	2	3	4	5	6	7	8	9	10	Final
Ontario (Scharf) 🔨	0	0	1	0	3	0	0	0	1	2	7
Saskatchewan (Streifel)	0	0	0	1	0	2	1	1	0	0	5

Sheet D	1	2	3	4	5	6	7	8	9	10	11	Final
Northwest Territories/Yukon (Koe) 🔨	1	0	1	0	1	2	0	1	0	0	0	6
Prince Edward Island (Gaudet)	0	1	0	0	0	0	1	0	2	2	1	7

=== Draw 7 ===
Monday, February 27, 2:00 pm

Sheet A	1	2	3	4	5	6	7	8	9	10	Final
New Brunswick (Kelly) 🔨	1	0	1	0	2	0	0	0	3	0	7
Manitoba (Harvey)	0	1	0	1	0	1	1	0	0	0	4

Sheet B	1	2	3	4	5	6	7	8	9	10	Final
British Columbia (Scott) 🔨	2	0	1	3	0	3	0	2	X	X	11
Newfoundland and Labrador (Strong)	0	2	0	0	1	0	3	0	X	X	6

Sheet C	1	2	3	4	5	6	7	8	9	10	Final
Prince Edward Island (Gaudet) 🔨	0	0	1	0	0	2	0	1	0	X	4
Canada (J. Jones)	1	1	0	0	3	0	1	0	3	X	9

Sheet D	1	2	3	4	5	6	7	8	9	10	Final
Saskatchewan (Streifel) 🔨	2	0	0	2	0	0	0	1	0	0	5
Quebec (Bélisle)	0	2	1	0	0	1	1	0	0	2	7

=== Draw 8 ===
Monday, February 27, 7:00 pm

Sheet A	1	2	3	4	5	6	7	8	9	10	Final
Quebec (Bélisle) 🔨	0	0	3	1	0	2	0	1	0	X	7
Ontario (Scharf)	0	1	0	0	1	0	1	0	2	X	5

Sheet B	1	2	3	4	5	6	7	8	9	10	Final
Canada (J. Jones) 🔨	2	1	0	4	0	0	1	1	0	X	9
Northwest Territories/Yukon (Koe)	0	0	2	0	1	1	0	0	1	X	5

Sheet C	1	2	3	4	5	6	7	8	9	10	Final
Newfoundland and Labrador (Strong) 🔨	0	0	0	2	0	2	0	1	0	3	8
Nova Scotia (C. Jones)	0	0	0	0	3	0	1	0	1	0	5

Sheet D	1	2	3	4	5	6	7	8	9	10	Final
Manitoba (Harvey) 🔨	0	0	0	1	0	1	0	X	X	X	2
Alberta (King)	1	2	2	0	1	0	3	X	X	X	9

=== Draw 9 ===
Tuesday, February 28, 9:30 am

Sheet A	1	2	3	4	5	6	7	8	9	10	Final
Newfoundland and Labrador (Strong) 🔨	1	2	0	1	0	1	0	1	0	1	7
Northwest Territories/Yukon (Koe)	0	0	1	0	1	0	3	0	1	0	6

Sheet B	1	2	3	4	5	6	7	8	9	10	Final
Manitoba (Harvey) 🔨	0	0	1	0	2	0	2	0	2	3	10
Ontario (Scharf)	0	3	0	2	0	1	0	1	0	0	7

Sheet C	1	2	3	4	5	6	7	8	9	10	Final
Quebec (Bélisle) 🔨	0	1	0	0	1	0	3	0	3	0	8
Alberta (King)	1	0	0	3	0	1	0	3	0	2	10

Sheet D	1	2	3	4	5	6	7	8	9	10	Final
Canada (J. Jones) 🔨	0	0	1	0	1	0	2	1	1	0	6
Nova Scotia (C. Jones)	1	1	0	2	0	1	0	0	0	2	7

=== Draw 10 ===
Tuesday, February 28, 2:00 pm

Sheet A	1	2	3	4	5	6	7	8	9	10	Final
Alberta (King) 🔨	2	1	0	1	1	1	1	X	X	X	7
Prince Edward Island (Gaudet)	0	0	0	0	0	0	0	X	X	X	0

Sheet B	1	2	3	4	5	6	7	8	9	10	Final
Nova Scotia (C. Jones) 🔨	1	1	0	2	0	1	0	0	0	2	7
Saskatchewan (Streifel)	0	0	0	0	2	0	1	1	1	0	5

Sheet C	1	2	3	4	5	6	7	8	9	10	Final
Northwest Territories/Yukon (Koe) 🔨	2	0	3	0	2	1	0	0	1	X	9
New Brunswick (Kelly)	0	1	0	1	0	0	1	1	0	X	4

Sheet D	1	2	3	4	5	6	7	8	9	10	Final
Ontario (Scharf) 🔨	0	2	0	1	1	0	1	0	2	1	8
British Columbia (Scott)	0	0	2	0	0	1	0	2	0	0	5

=== Draw 11 ===
Tuesday, February 28, 7:00 pm

Sheet A	1	2	3	4	5	6	7	8	9	10	Final
Saskatchewan (Streifel) 🔨	1	0	1	0	1	1	0	1	1	0	6
Canada (J. Jones)	0	1	0	2	0	0	1	0	0	3	7

Sheet B	1	2	3	4	5	6	7	8	9	10	Final
Prince Edward Island (Gaudet) 🔨	0	1	0	1	1	0	1	2	0	3	9
Quebec (Bélisle)	2	0	2	0	0	2	0	0	2	0	8

Sheet C	1	2	3	4	5	6	7	8	9	10	Final
British Columbia (Scott) 🔨	2	0	1	0	5	0	0	X	X	X	8
Manitoba (Harvey)	0	1	0	1	0	0	1	X	X	X	3

Sheet D	1	2	3	4	5	6	7	8	9	10	11	Final
New Brunswick (Kelly) 🔨	0	0	1	0	0	1	0	0	2	1	0	5
Newfoundland and Labrador (Strong)	0	2	0	1	0	0	1	1	0	0	1	6

=== Draw 12 ===
Wednesday, March 1, 9:30 am

Sheet A	1	2	3	4	5	6	7	8	9	10	Final
British Columbia (Scott) 🔨	0	4	0	1	1	0	2	0	1	X	9
Quebec (Bélisle)	0	0	2	0	0	1	0	2	0	X	5

Sheet B	1	2	3	4	5	6	7	8	9	10	Final
New Brunswick (Kelly) 🔨	0	2	1	0	1	0	0	3	1	0	8
Canada (J. Jones)	1	0	0	2	0	3	2	0	0	4	12

Sheet C	1	2	3	4	5	6	7	8	9	10	Final
Saskatchewan (Streifel) 🔨	2	0	1	0	2	0	1	0	0	X	6
Newfoundland and Labrador (Strong)	0	2	0	1	0	2	0	3	1	X	9

Sheet D	1	2	3	4	5	6	7	8	9	10	Final
Prince Edward Island (Gaudet) 🔨	1	0	0	2	2	0	0	1	0	0	6
Manitoba (Harvey)	0	3	0	0	0	1	1	0	1	1	7

=== Draw 13 ===
Wednesday, March 1, 2:00 pm

Sheet A	1	2	3	4	5	6	7	8	9	10	Final
Manitoba (Harvey) 🔨	1	2	0	0	0	1	1	1	0	0	6
Nova Scotia (C. Jones)	0	0	1	1	2	0	0	0	1	2	7

Sheet B	1	2	3	4	5	6	7	8	9	10	Final
Newfoundland and Labrador (Strong) 🔨	0	2	0	0	1	3	1	0	0	1	8
Alberta (King)	3	0	1	2	0	0	0	1	0	0	7

Sheet C	1	2	3	4	5	6	7	8	9	10	11	Final
Canada (J. Jones) 🔨	0	1	0	1	0	1	0	0	2	0	3	8
Ontario (Scharf)	0	0	0	0	2	0	1	0	0	2	0	5

Sheet D	1	2	3	4	5	6	7	8	9	10	Final
Quebec (Bélisle) 🔨	2	0	1	1	0	2	0	3	X	X	9
Northwest Territories/Yukon (Koe)	0	2	0	0	1	0	1	0	X	X	4

=== Draw 14 ===
Wednesday, March 1, 7:00 pm

Sheet A	1	2	3	4	5	6	7	8	9	10	11	Final
Ontario (Scharf) 🔨	0	0	2	0	2	0	2	0	1	2	0	9
New Brunswick (Kelly)	0	1	0	4	0	2	0	2	0	0	3	12

Sheet B	1	2	3	4	5	6	7	8	9	10	Final
Northwest Territories/Yukon (Koe) 🔨	0	1	0	2	0	1	0	1	0	X	5
British Columbia (Scott)	1	0	2	0	2	0	2	0	1	X	8

Sheet C	1	2	3	4	5	6	7	8	9	10	Final
Nova Scotia (C. Jones) 🔨	0	1	2	1	0	1	1	0	X	X	6
Prince Edward Island (Gaudet)	0	0	0	0	0	0	0	1	X	X	1

Sheet D	1	2	3	4	5	6	7	8	9	10	Final
Alberta (King) 🔨	0	1	0	5	1	0	1	3	X	X	11
Saskatchewan (Streifel)	0	0	1	0	0	1	0	0	X	X	2

=== Draw 15 ===
Thursday, March 2, 8:30 am

Sheet A	1	2	3	4	5	6	7	8	9	10	Final
Prince Edward Island (Gaudet) 🔨	0	1	0	4	0	0	0	1	0	X	6
Newfoundland and Labrador (Strong)	1	0	2	0	1	1	1	0	3	X	9

Sheet B	1	2	3	4	5	6	7	8	9	10	Final
Saskatchewan (Streifel) 🔨	1	1	0	0	1	0	1	0	0	3	7
Manitoba (Harvey)	0	0	2	0	0	2	0	1	1	0	6

Sheet C	1	2	3	4	5	6	7	8	9	10	11	Final
New Brunswick (Kelly) 🔨	1	0	0	2	0	1	0	1	0	1	0	6
Quebec (Bélisle)	0	0	3	0	1	0	1	0	1	0	1	7

Sheet D	1	2	3	4	5	6	7	8	9	10	Final
British Columbia (Scott) 🔨	1	1	0	2	0	1	0	1	0	1	7
Canada (J. Jones)	0	0	2	0	1	0	1	0	1	0	5

=== Draw 16 ===
Thursday, March 2, 1:00 pm

Sheet A	1	2	3	4	5	6	7	8	9	10	Final
Northwest Territories/Yukon (Koe) 🔨	1	0	4	0	2	0	0	1	1	X	9
Saskatchewan (Streifel)	0	1	0	1	0	2	1	0	0	X	5

Sheet B	1	2	3	4	5	6	7	8	9	10	Final
Ontario (Scharf) 🔨	0	0	0	0	1	1	0	0	X	X	2
Prince Edward Island (Gaudet)	1	1	2	1	0	0	2	1	X	X	8

Sheet C	1	2	3	4	5	6	7	8	9	10	Final
Alberta (King) 🔨	0	1	0	2	0	0	1	0	0	X	4
British Columbia (Scott)	1	0	2	0	0	3	0	0	2	X	8

Sheet D	1	2	3	4	5	6	7	8	9	10	Final
Nova Scotia (C. Jones) 🔨	0	2	0	1	0	1	1	0	1	X	6
New Brunswick (Kelly)	0	0	1	0	1	0	0	1	0	X	3

=== Draw 17 ===
Thursday, March 2, 7:00 pm

Sheet A	1	2	3	4	5	6	7	8	9	10	Final
Canada (J. Jones) 🔨	2	0	0	2	1	0	0	2	1	1	9
Alberta (King)	0	2	1	0	0	2	2	0	0	0	7

Sheet B	1	2	3	4	5	6	7	8	9	10	Final
Quebec (Bélisle) 🔨	0	0	2	0	1	0	1	2	0	2	8
Nova Scotia (C. Jones)	1	1	0	1	0	2	0	0	1	0	6

Sheet C	1	2	3	4	5	6	7	8	9	10	Final
Manitoba (Harvey) 🔨	2	0	3	0	0	1	1	1	1	X	9
Northwest Territories/Yukon (Koe)	0	1	0	3	0	0	0	0	0	X	4

Sheet D	1	2	3	4	5	6	7	8	9	10	Final
Newfoundland and Labrador (Strong) 🔨	1	1	0	0	3	0	0	0	2	0	7
Ontario (Scharf)	0	0	2	0	0	1	1	2	0	3	9

== Tiebreaker ==
Friday, March 3, 8:30 am

Sheet C	1	2	3	4	5	6	7	8	9	10	Final
Newfoundland and Labrador (Strong)	0	0	1	0	0	1	0	0	X	X	2
Quebec (Bélisle) 🔨	0	2	0	1	1	0	3	1	X	X	8

Player percentages
Newfoundland and Labrador		Quebec	
Susan O'Leary	97%	Saskia Hollands	95%
Laura Strong	80%	Martine Comeau	78%
Shelley Nichols	84%	Pamela Nugent	94%
Heather Strong	67%	Ève Bélisle	87%
Total	82%	Total	88%

== Playoffs ==
Page playoff system
1	British Columbia	6
2	Nova Scotia	5
3	Canada	10
4	Quebec	4

Semifinal
2	Nova Scotia	4
3	Canada	10

Final
1	British Columbia	8
3	Canada	6

=== 1 vs. 2 ===
Friday, March 3, 1:00 pm

Sheet C	1	2	3	4	5	6	7	8	9	10	Final
British Columbia (Scott) 🔨	0	1	0	1	1	0	1	1	0	1	6
Nova Scotia (C. Jones)	0	0	1	0	0	2	0	0	2	0	5

Player percentages
British Columbia		Nova Scotia	
Renee Simons	85%	Nancy Delahunt	93%
Sasha Carter	80%	Mary-Anne Arsenault	86%
Jeanna Schraeder	81%	Kim Kelly	84%
Kelly Scott	92%	Colleen Jones	81%
Total	84%	Total	86%

=== 3 vs. 4 ===
Friday, March 3, 7:00 pm

Sheet C	1	2	3	4	5	6	7	8	9	10	Final
Quebec (Bélisle)	0	1	0	2	0	0	1	X	X	X	4
Canada (J. Jones) 🔨	3	0	4	0	2	1	0	X	X	X	10

Player percentages
Quebec		Canada	
Saskia Hollands	95%	Georgina Wheatcroft	98%
Martine Comeau	80%	Jill Officer	93%
Pamela Nugent	68%	Cathy Overton-Clapham	84%
Ève Bélisle	46%	Jennifer Jones	88%
Total	72%	Total	90%

=== Semifinal ===
Saturday, March 4, 1:00 pm

Sheet C	1	2	3	4	5	6	7	8	9	10	Final
Nova Scotia (C. Jones) 🔨	1	0	1	0	1	0	1	0	X	X	4
Canada (J. Jones)	0	2	0	1	0	3	0	4	X	X	10

Player percentages
Canada		Nova Scotia	
Georgina Wheatcroft	83%	Nancy Delahunt	92%
Jill Officer	77%	Mary-Anne Arsenault	89%
Cathy Overton-Clapham	78%	Kim Kelly	83%
Jennifer Jones	91%	Colleen Jones	63%
Total	82%	Total	82%

=== Final ===
Sunday, March 5, 12:30 pm

Sheet C	1	2	3	4	5	6	7	8	9	10	Final
British Columbia (Scott) 🔨	1	0	3	1	0	1	1	0	0	1	8
Canada (J. Jones)	0	1	0	0	2	0	0	2	1	0	6

Player percentages
British Columbia		Canada	
Renee Simons	66%	Georgina Wheatcroft	98%
Sasha Carter	85%	Jill Officer	79%
Jeanna Schraeder	86%	Cathy Overton-Clapham	80%
Kelly Scott	82%	Jennifer Jones	75%
Total	80%	Total	83%

== Statistics ==
=== Top 5 Player Percentages ===
Round robin only

Key
First All-Star Team
Second All-Star Team

Leads	%
(Canada) Georgina Wheatcroft	85
(Nova Scotia) Nancy Delahunt	84
(Alberta) Tracy Bush	84
(British Columbia) Renee Simons	82
(Manitoba) Carey Burgess	81
(Saskatchewan) Andrea Rudulier	81

Seconds	%
(Nova Scotia) Mary-Anne Arsenault	82
(British Columbia) Sasha Carter	81
(Newfoundland and Labrador) Laura Strong	76
(Alberta) Raylene Rocque	76
(Canada) Jill Officer	76

Thirds	%
(British Columbia) Jeanna Schraeder	81
(Canada) Cathy Overton-Clapham	79
(Nova Scotia) Kim Kelly	78
(Alberta) Lori Armitstead	76
(New Brunswick) Kristen MacDiarmid	75

Skips	%
(British Columbia) Kelly Scott	84
(Nova Scotia) Colleen Jones	78
(Newfoundland and Labrador) Heather Strong	78
(Saskatchewan) Tracy Streifel	74
(Quebec) Ève Bélisle	73

== Awards ==
=== All-Star teams ===
First Team
Position	Name	Team
Skip	Kelly Scott	British Columbia
Third	Jeanna Schraeder	British Columbia
Second	Mary-Anne Arsenault	Nova Scotia
Lead	Georgina Wheatcroft	Canada

Second Team
Position	Name	Team
Skip	Heather Strong	Newfoundland and Labrador
Third	Cathy Overton-Clapham	Canada
Second	Sasha Carter	British Columbia
Lead	Nancy Delahunt	Nova Scotia

=== Marj Mitchell Sportsmanship Award ===
The Marj Mitchell Sportsmanship Award was presented to the player chosen by their fellow peers as the curler that most exemplified sportsmanship and dedication to curling during the annual Scotties Tournament of Hearts.

Name	Position	Team
Kelly Scott	Skip	British Columbia

=== Sandra Schmirler Most Valuable Player Award ===
The Sandra Schmirler Most Valuable Player Award was awarded to the top player in the playoff round by members of the media in the Scotties Tournament of Hearts.

Name	Position	Team
Kelly Scott	Skip	British Columbia

=== Joan Mead Builder Award ===
The Joan Mead Builder Award recognizes a builder in the sport of curling named in the honour of the late CBC curling producer Joan Mead.

Name	Contribution(s)
Robin Wilson	Scott Tournament of Hearts coordinator

=== Ford Hot Shots ===
The Ford Hot Shots was a skills competition preceding the round robin of the tournament. Each competitor had to perform a series of shots with each shot scoring between 0 and 5 points depending on where the stone came to rest. The winner of this edition of the event would win a two-year lease on a Ford Explorer XLT.

Winner	Runner-Up	Score
(Nova Scotia) Colleen Jones	(Manitoba) Jill Thurston	14–11

=== Shot of the Week Award ===
The Shot of the Week Award was awarded to the curler who had been determined with the most outstanding shot during the tournament as voted on by TSN commentators.

Name	Position	Team
Jennifer Jones	Skip	Canada

== Qualifying ==
Bold indicates winner. Italics indicated defending provincial champion

Alberta
Skip	Club	W	L
**Cathy King**	Saville Centre Curling Club	7	0
Renée Sonnenberg	Grande Prairie Curling Club	5	2
Renelle Bryden	Calgary Curling Club	4	3
Crystal Rumberg	Calgary Curling Club	4	3
Vicki Sjolie	Medicine Hat Curling Club	3	4
Kristie Moore	Grande Prairie Curling Club	2	5
Faye White	Rose City Curling Club	2	5
Chana Martineau	Saville Centre Curling Club	1	6

Tie-breaker

- Bryden 13-4 Rumberg

Playoffs:

- Semi-final: Sonnenberg 6-3 Bryden
- Final: King 8-2 Sonnenberg

Event held at the Shamrock Curling Club in Edmonton January 24–29

British Columbia
Skip	Club	W	L
**Kelly Scott**	Kelowna Curling Club	6	1
Toni Wells	Golden Ears Curling Club	6	1
Marla Mallett	Royal City Curling Club	5	2
Tracey Jones	Prince George Golf & Curling Club	4	3
Kristen Recksiedler	Royal City Curling Club	3	4
Kristy Lewis	Richmond Curling Club	3	4
Lyn Perry	Summerland Curling Club	1	6
Jill Winters	Nelson Curling Club	0	7

Playoffs:

- Semi-final: Wells 8-6 Mallett
- Final: Scott 8-5 Wells

Event held at the Williams Lake Curling Club in Williams Lake January 25–29.

Manitoba
Red Group
Skip	Club	W	L
**Janet Harvey**	Fort Rouge Curling Club	5	2
Kristy Jenion	St. Vital Curling Club	4	3
Lois Fowler	Wheat City Curling Club	4	3
Debbie Cripps	Burntwood Curling Club	4	3
Marlene Lang	St. Vital Curling Club	3	4
Darcy Robertson	Fort Rouge Curling Club	3	4
Rhonda Varnes	Stonewall Curling Club	3	4
Gwen Wooley	Baldur Curling Club	2	5
Black Group
Skip	Club	W	L
Karen Porritt	St. Vital Curling Club	6	1
Barb Spencer	Fort Rouge Curling Club	5	2
Shauna Streich	Fort Rouge Curling Club	5	2
Quinn Adams	Beausejour Curling Club	4	3
Terry Ursel	Plumas Curling Club	3	4
Holly Scott	Gilbert Plains Curling Club	2	5
Kristen Williamson	Roseland Curling Club	2	5
Chris Scalena	Starbuck Curling Club	1	6

Tie-breakers:

- Fowler 5-3 Cripps
- Jenion 7-3 Fowler
- Streich 11-4 Spencer

Play-offs

- Red2 vs Black2: Jenion 5-4 Streich
- Red1 vs Black1: Harvey 6-5 Porritt
- Semi-final: Jenion 7-8 Porritt
- Final: Harvey 9-3 Jenion

Event held at the C.A. Nesbitt Arena in Thompson January 25–29.

Defending Manitoba champion, Jennifer Jones won the 2005 Scott Tournament of Hearts, meaning she will get an automatic bye to the championships and did not have to go through qualifying.

New Brunswick
Skip	Club	W	L
**Andrea Kelly**	Capital Winter Club	6	1
Melissa Adams	Curling Beauséjour, Inc.	6	1
Sandy Comeau	Beaver Curling Club	5	2
Heidi Hanlon	Thistle St. Andrews Curling Club	5	2
Sylvie Robichaud	Curling Beauséjour, Inc.	3	4
Becky Atkinson	Capital Winter Club	2	5
Kathy Floyd	Thistle St. Andrews Curling Club	1	6
Stacey Lacey	Thistle St. Andrews Curling Club/ Beaver Curling Club	0	7

Tie-breaker

- Hanlon 8-4 Comeau

Playoffs

- Semi-final: Hanlon 10-8 Adams
- Final: Kelly 8-7 Hanlon

Event held at Curling Beauséjour, Inc. in Moncton January 25–29

Newfoundland and Labrador
Skip	Club	W	L
**Heather Strong**	St. John's Curling Club	4	0
Cathy Cunningham	St. John's Curling Club	3	1
Darlene Thomas	Corner Brook Curling Association	2	2
Sheila Adams	Gander Curling Club	1	3
Barb Pinsent	St. John's Curling Club	0	4

Playoffs

- Semi-final: Cunningham 6-4 Thomas
- Final (Strong needs to be defeated twice): Cunningham 9-6 Strong; Strong 6-5 Cunningham

Event held at the Corner Brook Rec Plex in Corner Brook January 25–29

Nova Scotia
Skip	Club	W	L
**Colleen Jones**	Mayflower Curling Club	6	1
Kay Zinck	Mayflower Curling Club	5	2
Jill Mouzar	Mayflower Curling Club	4	3
Jocelyn Palmer	Truro Curling Club	4	3
Brandi Mahaney	Mayflower Curling Club	3	4
Penny LaRocque	Mayflower Curling Club	3	4
Nancy McConnery	Dartmouth Curling Club	2	5
Jill Alcoe-Holland	Glooscap Curling Club	1	6

Tie-breaker

- Mouzar 8-7 Palmer

Playoffs

- Semi-final: Zinck 9-8 Mouzar
- Final: Jones 9-8 Zinck

Colleen Jones represented Team Canada at the 2005 Scott Tournament of Hearts because she had won it in 2004.

Event held at the Highlander Curling Club in St. Andrews January 25–29.

Ontario
Skip	Club	W	L
**Krista Scharf**	Fort William Curling Club	7	2
Janet McGhee	Uxbridge & District Curling Club	7	2
Marilyn Bodogh	St. Catharines Curling Club	6	3
Jenn Hanna	Ottawa Curling Club	6	3
Jo-Ann Rizzo	Brant Curling Club	5	4
Chrissy Cadorin	Guelph Curling Club	5	4
Kathy Brown	Sutton Curling Club	4	5
Nancy Wickham	Sudbury Curling Club	3	6
Natalie Beauchamp	Coniston Curling Club	2	7
Marlo Dahl	Fort William Curling Club	0	9

Playoffs

- 3 vs. 4: Bodogh 9-8 Hanna
- 1 vs. 2: Scharf 5-4 McGhee
- Semi-final: McGhee 8-5 Bodogh
- Final: Scharf 7-6 McGhee

Event held at the Fort Frances Curling Club in Fort Frances January 29-February 4

Prince Edward Island
Skip	Club	W	L
**Suzanne Gaudet**	Charlottetown Curling Club	5	0
Shelly Bradley	Charlottetown Curling Club	4	1
Kathy O'Rourke	Charlottetown Curling Club	3	2
Bev Beaton	Charlottetown Curling Club	2	3
Shirley Berry	Cornwall Curling Club/ Charlottetown Curling Club	1	4
Karen Currie	Cornwall Curling Club	0	5

Playoffs

- Semi-final: Bradley 7-6 O'Rourke
- Final: Gaudet 11-3 Bradley

Event held at the Maple Leaf Curling Club in O'Leary January 19–22.

The defending champion, Rebecca Jean MacPhee played third for O'Rourke

Quebec
Pool A
Skip	Club	W	L
Marie-France Larouche	Club de curling Victoria/ Club de curling Etchemin	6	1
**Eve Bélisle**	Lachine Curling Club/ Club de curling Longue Pointe	5	2
Agnès Lanthier	Valleyfield Curling Club	5	2
Nathalie Gagnon	Club de curling Alma/ Club de curling Kénogami	4	3
Gaétane Tremblay	Club de curling de la Vallée	3	4
Barb Hart	Montreal West Curling Club	3	4
Louise Desrosiers	Club de curling Victoria	2	5
Nicole Cinq-Mars	Club de curling St-Félicien	0	7
Pool B
Skip	Club	W	L
Chantal Osborne	Thurso Curling Club	7	0
Geneviève Frappier	Club de curling Longue Pointe/ Club de curling Boucherville	6	1
Janique Berthelot	Club de curling Victoria	5	2
Isabelle Néron	Club de curling Kénogami/ Club de curling Alma	4	3
Gail Moorcroft	Glenmore Curling Club/ Lachine Curling Club	2	5
Kim Beardsell	Club de Curling Outremont	2	5
Marcia Giroux	Club de curling Norada	1	6
Denise Prévost	Club de curling Laviolette/ Cap De La Madeleine Curling Club	1	6

Tie-breaker

- Belisle 5-4 Lanthier

Playoffs

- A1 vs. B1 game: Osborne 8-7 Larouche
- Quarter-final: Belisle 7-4 Frappier
- Semi-final: Belisle 8-5 Larouche
- Final: Belisle 7-5 Osborne

Event held at the Club de curling Victoria in Quebec City January 15–22.

The defending champion, Brenda Nicholls played third for Berthelot

Saskatchewan
Skip	Club	W	L
**Tracy Streifel**	Nutana Curling Club	6	1
Stefanie Lawton	CN Curling Club	6	1
Delores Syrota	Wadena Curling Club	4	3
Leah Birnie	Weyburn Curling Club	4	3
Chantelle Eberle	Balgonie Curling Club	3	4
Kathy Thiele	Callie Curling Club	3	4
Karen Purdy	Balgonie Curling Club	2	5
Heather Burnett	Martensville Curling Club	0	7

Tie-breaker

- Syrota 6-5 Birnie

Playoffs

- Semi-final: Syrota 6-5 Lawton
- Final: Streifel 7-5 Syrota

Event held at the Yorkton Curling Club in Yorkton February 1–5.

Northwest Territories/Yukon
Skip	Club	W	L
**Kerry Koe**	Yellowknife Curling Club	5	0
Nicole Baldwin	Whitehorse Curling Club	3	2
Dawn Moses	Yellowknife Curling Club	2	3
Sandy Penkala	Yellowknife Curling Club	0	5

No playoffs or tie-breakers necessary.

Event held at the Yellowknife Curling Club in Yellowknife January 26–29
