= 2006 World Women's Curling Championship =

- Host city: Grande Prairie, Alberta, Canada
- Arena: Canada Games Arena
- Dates: March 18–26, 2006
- Winner: Sweden
- Curling club: Härnösands CK
- Skip: Anette Norberg
- Third: Eva Lund
- Second: Cathrine Lindahl
- Lead: Anna Svärd
- Alternate: Ulrika Bergman
- Coach: Stefan Hasselborg
- Finalist: United States (Debbie McCormick)

The 2006 World Women's Curling Championship (branded as 2006 Ford World Women's Curling Championship for sponsorship reasons) was held March 18–26 at the Canada Games Arena in Grande Prairie, Alberta, Canada.

Sweden, skipped by Anette Norberg, fresh off winning a gold medal at the 2006 Winter Olympics, defeated the United States, skipped by Debbie McCormick in the final, 10–9. Norberg won the game by making a draw in the 10th end. It was the second of three world championships for Norberg.

== Teams ==
Canada	China	Denmark
Kelowna CC, Kelowna Skip: Kelly Scott; Third: Jeanna Schraeder; Second: Sasha Carter; Lead: Renee Simons; Alternate: Michelle Allen	Harbin CC, Harbin Skip: Wang Bingyu; Third: Yue Qingshuang; Second: Liu Yin; Lead: Zhou Yan; Alternate: Sun Yue	Tårnby CC, Tårnby Skip: Madeleine Dupont; Third: Camilla Jensen; Second: Denise Dupont; Lead: Angelina Jensen**; Alternate: Charlotte Hedegård
Germany	Italy	Japan
SC Riessersee, Garmisch-Partenkirchen Skip: Andrea Schöpp; Third: Monika Wagner; Second: Anna Hartelt; Lead: Marie Rotter; Alternate: Tina Tchatschke	New Wave CC, Cortina d'Ampezzo Skip: Diana Gaspari; Third: Giulia Lacedelli; Second: Rosa Pompanin; Lead: Violetta Caldart; Alternate: Arianna Lorenzi	Karuizawa CC, Karuizawa Skip: Yukako Tsuchiya; Third: Junko Sonobe; Second: Tomoko Sonobe; Lead: Chiemi Kameyama; Alternate: Mitsuki Satoh
Netherlands	Norway	Scotland
CC Utrecht, Utrecht Skip: Shari Leibbrandt-Demmon; Third: Ellen van der Cammen; Second: Margrietha Voskuilen; Lead: Erika Doornbos; Alternate: Idske de Jong	Snarøen CC, Oslo Skip: Dordi Nordby; Third: Marianne Haslum; Second: Camilla Holth; Lead: Charlotte Hovring; Alternate: Kristin Skaslien	Dun CC, Montrose & Stirling; Ice Rink Sports Club, Stirling Skip: Kelly Wood; Third: Lorna Vevers; Second: Kim Brewster; Lead: Lindsay Wood; Alternate: Kerry Barr
Sweden	Switzerland	United States
Härnösands CK, Härnösand Skip: Anette Norberg; Third: Eva Lund; Second: Cathrine Lindahl; Lead: Anna Svärd; Alternate: Ulrika Bergman	Dübendorf CC, Dübendorf Skip: Silvana Tirinzoni; Third: Sandra Attinger; Second: Anna Neuenschwander; Lead: Esther Neuenschwander; Alternate: Carmen Schäfer	Madison CC, Madison Skip: Debbie McCormick; Third: Allison Pottinger; Second: Nicole Joraanstad; Lead: Natalie Nicholson; Alternate: Caitlin Maroldo

** Angelina Jensen skipped the Danish team until she suffered a miscarriage and had to return to Denmark. Fourth Madeleine Dupont was given skipping duties following Jensen's departure.

== Round robin standings ==
Country	Skip	W	L	PF	PA	Ends Won	Ends Lost	Blank Ends	Stolen Ends	Shot Pct.
Sweden	Anette Norberg	10	1	93	51	53	43	8	14	85%
United States	Debbie McCormick	10	1	92	48	56	33	11	26	84%
Germany	Andrea Schöpp	8	3	83	63	49	47	12	12	73%
Canada	Kelly Scott	7	4	77	63	47	44	14	12	81%
China	Wang Bingyu	6	5	71	58	45	47	16	7	78%
Denmark	Angelina Jensen	6	5	81	79	51	47	7	17	73%
Norway	Dordi Nordby	5	6	72	64	45	46	12	12	74%
Scotland	Kelly Wood	4	7	59	83	44	46	13	9	76%
Italy	Diana Gaspari	4	7	66	73	51	40	17	19	72%
Switzerland	Silvana Tirinzoni	3	8	49	82	36	52	10	6	73%
Japan	Yukako Tsuchiya	3	8	59	72	40	51	15	7	75%
Netherlands	Shari Leibbrandt-Demmon	0	11	37	103	34	55	11	5	68%

== Round robin results ==
=== Draw 1 ===
March 18, 14:30

Sheet A	1	2	3	4	5	6	7	8	9	10	Final
China (Wang) 🔨	0	0	1	0	1	0	0	0	1	0	3
Norway (Nordby)	0	0	0	1	0	1	1	1	0	1	5

Sheet B	1	2	3	4	5	6	7	8	9	10	Final
Sweden (Norberg)	0	0	2	2	0	2	0	2	0	0	8
Germany (Schöpp) 🔨	0	1	0	0	3	0	1	0	1	1	7

Sheet C	1	2	3	4	5	6	7	8	9	10	Final
Japan (Tsuchiya) 🔨	1	0	0	0	0	1	0	0	0	X	2
Canada (Scott)	0	1	0	1	1	0	1	0	1	X	5

Sheet D	1	2	3	4	5	6	7	8	9	10	Final
Switzerland (Tirinzoni)	0	0	1	0	0	0	0	0	X	X	1
United States (McCormick) 🔨	0	1	0	2	1	1	1	2	X	X	8

=== Draw 2 ===
March 18, 21:00

Sheet A	1	2	3	4	5	6	7	8	9	10	Final
Canada (Scott)	0	0	2	0	1	0	0	1	0	X	4
Sweden (Norberg) 🔨	0	4	0	1	0	1	1	0	1	X	8

Sheet B	1	2	3	4	5	6	7	8	9	10	Final
Scotland (Wood)	0	0	0	2	0	1	0	3	0	1	7
Italy (Gaspari) 🔨	0	1	0	0	2	0	1	0	2	0	6

Sheet C	1	2	3	4	5	6	7	8	9	10	Final
Netherlands (Leibbrandt-Demmon) 🔨	1	0	0	1	0	1	1	0	0	0	4
Denmark (Jensen)	0	1	2	0	2	0	0	1	1	3	10

Sheet D	1	2	3	4	5	6	7	8	9	10	Final
Japan (Tsuchiya) 🔨	1	0	0	1	0	1	0	2	0	X	5
Germany (Schöpp)	0	2	1	0	3	0	1	0	2	X	9

=== Draw 3 ===
March 19, 09:00

Sheet A	1	2	3	4	5	6	7	8	9	10	Final
United States (McCormick)	2	1	0	1	2	0	2	0	0	0	8
China (Wang) 🔨	0	0	1	0	0	2	0	1	1	0	5

Sheet B	1	2	3	4	5	6	7	8	9	10	Final
Switzerland (Tirinzoni) 🔨	0	0	1	0	0	1	0	X	X	X	2
Norway (Nordby)	0	1	0	2	3	0	2	X	X	X	8

=== Draw 4 ===
March 19, 13:30

Sheet A	1	2	3	4	5	6	7	8	9	10	Final
Italy (Gaspari) 🔨	0	1	1	0	1	1	1	2	0	X	7
Netherlands (Leibbrandt-Demmon)	1	0	0	0	0	0	0	0	1	X	2

Sheet B	1	2	3	4	5	6	7	8	9	10	Final
Germany (Schöpp)	0	1	0	0	1	0	1	0	0	0	3
Canada (Scott) 🔨	1	0	0	1	0	2	0	1	1	2	8

Sheet C	1	2	3	4	5	6	7	8	9	10	Final
Sweden (Norberg) 🔨	0	2	0	0	4	0	1	0	2	X	9
Japan (Tsuchiya)	0	0	1	1	0	1	0	1	0	X	4

Sheet D	1	2	3	4	5	6	7	8	9	10	Final
Scotland (Wood) 🔨	0	0	4	0	1	0	1	0	0	0	6
Denmark (Jensen)	0	0	0	1	0	3	0	2	2	2	10

=== Draw 5 ===
March 19, 18:30

Sheet A	1	2	3	4	5	6	7	8	9	10	Final
Norway (Nordby) 🔨	0	3	0	0	2	0	0	0	0	X	5
United States (McCormick)	0	0	2	1	0	1	2	1	1	X	8

Sheet B	1	2	3	4	5	6	7	8	9	10	Final
Netherlands (Leibbrandt-Demmon) 🔨	1	0	0	0	0	1	0	0	1	X	3
Scotland (Wood)	0	1	1	1	1	0	1	2	0	X	7

Sheet C	1	2	3	4	5	6	7	8	9	10	Final
Denmark (Jensen) 🔨	0	0	3	0	3	0	0	0	0	1	7
Italy (Gaspari)	0	1	0	1	0	1	1	1	1	0	6

Sheet D	1	2	3	4	5	6	7	8	9	10	Final
China (Wang) 🔨	0	1	3	0	1	0	0	3	0	X	8
Switzerland (Tirinzoni)	0	0	0	1	0	1	1	0	1	X	4

=== Draw 6 ===
March 20, 09:00

Sheet A	1	2	3	4	5	6	7	8	9	10	Final
Switzerland (Tirinzoni)	0	1	0	3	0	1	0	1	1	1	8
Japan (Tsuchiya) 🔨	1	0	1	0	2	0	2	0	0	0	6

Sheet B	1	2	3	4	5	6	7	8	9	10	Final
United States (McCormick)🔨	1	0	1	0	2	0	0	0	1	0	5
Sweden (Norberg)	0	1	0	2	0	2	1	1	0	1	8

Sheet C	1	2	3	4	5	6	7	8	9	10	Final
China (Wang)	0	0	0	1	1	0	0	2	0	1	5
Canada (Scott) 🔨	0	0	1	0	0	1	0	0	2	0	4

Sheet D	1	2	3	4	5	6	7	8	9	10	Final
Norway (Nordby)	0	0	0	1	0	2	0	0	1	0	4
Germany (Schöpp) 🔨	0	1	1	0	2	0	2	1	0	1	8

=== Draw 7 ===
March 20, 14:00

Sheet A	1	2	3	4	5	6	7	8	9	10	Final
Sweden (Norberg)	0	3	0	0	1	1	0	2	0	1	8
Denmark (Jensen) 🔨	1	0	1	1	0	0	1	0	2	0	6

Sheet B	1	2	3	4	5	6	7	8	9	10	Final
Japan (Tsuchiya)	0	0	1	0	0	1	0	0	2	0	4
Italy (Gaspari) 🔨	1	1	0	0	1	0	1	0	0	1	5

Sheet C	1	2	3	4	5	6	7	8	9	10	Final
Germany (Schöpp)	0	0	0	1	0	5	0	1	0	0	7
Netherlands (Leibbrandt-Demmon) 🔨	0	1	0	0	1	0	2	0	1	1	6

Sheet D	1	2	3	4	5	6	7	8	9	10	Final
Canada (Scott)	0	0	2	0	0	2	0	2	0	1	7
Scotland (Wood) 🔨	1	1	0	1	1	0	2	0	0	0	6

=== Draw 8 ===
March 20, 18:30

Sheet A	1	2	3	4	5	6	7	8	9	10	Final
Scotland (Wood) 🔨	1	0	1	0	1	0	1	0	1	0	5
China (Wang)	0	1	0	2	0	1	0	2	0	4	10

Sheet B	1	2	3	4	5	6	7	8	9	10	Final
Netherlands (Leibbrandt-Demmon)	0	1	0	1	0	0	1	0	1	0	4
Norway (Nordby) 🔨	3	0	2	0	1	1	0	0	0	1	8

Sheet C	1	2	3	4	5	6	7	8	9	10	Final
Italy (Gaspari)	0	1	0	0	0	2	1	1	0	1	6
Switzerland (Tirinzoni) 🔨	0	0	0	2	2	0	0	0	0	0	4

Sheet D	1	2	3	4	5	6	7	8	9	10	Final
Denmark (Jensen)	0	0	0	1	0	1	X	X	X	X	2
United States (McCormick) 🔨	1	2	3	0	3	0	X	X	X	X	9

=== Draw 9 ===
March 21, 09:00

Sheet A	1	2	3	4	5	6	7	8	9	10	Final
Italy (Gaspari) 🔨	0	2	0	1	0	2	1	0	1	0	7
Norway (Nordby)	1	0	2	0	1	0	0	1	0	0	5

Sheet B	1	2	3	4	5	6	7	8	9	10	Final
Denmark (Jensen) 🔨	1	0	0	1	0	1	0	1	0	X	4
China (Wang)	0	1	2	0	2	0	1	0	2	X	8

Sheet C	1	2	3	4	5	6	7	8	9	10	Final
Scotland (Wood)	0	0	2	0	1	0	0	X	X	X	3
United States (McCormick) 🔨	0	2	0	3	0	5	1	X	X	X	11

Sheet D	1	2	3	4	5	6	7	8	9	10	Final
Netherlands (Leibbrandt-Demmon)	0	1	0	1	0	1	0	1	0	0	4
Switzerland (Tirinzoni) 🔨	0	0	2	0	2	0	2	0	2	1	9

=== Draw 10 ===
March 21, 14:00

Sheet A	1	2	3	4	5	6	7	8	9	10	Final
United States (McCormick)	0	0	0	1	1	0	1	0	2	1	6
Germany (Schöpp) 🔨	1	0	1	0	0	2	0	1	0	0	5

Sheet B	1	2	3	4	5	6	7	8	9	10	Final
Switzerland (Tirinzoni)	0	0	2	0	0	1	0	1	0	X	4
Canada (Scott) 🔨	0	2	0	1	1	0	1	0	3	X	8

Sheet C	1	2	3	4	5	6	7	8	9	10	Final
Norway (Nordby)	0	1	1	0	0	1	0	1	1	0	5
Sweden (Norberg) 🔨	2	0	0	2	1	0	1	0	0	1	7

Sheet D	1	2	3	4	5	6	7	8	9	10	Final
China (Wang)	0	0	0	0	1	0	0	0	1	0	2
Japan (Tsuchiya) 🔨	0	1	0	0	0	1	1	0	0	1	4

=== Draw 11 ===
March 21, 18:30

Sheet A	1	2	3	4	5	6	7	8	9	10	Final
Canada (Scott)	0	5	1	4	0	3	X	X	X	X	13
Netherlands (Leibbrandt-Demmon) 🔨	1	0	0	0	2	0	X	X	X	X	3

Sheet B	1	2	3	4	5	6	7	8	9	10	Final
Germany (Schöpp) 🔨	1	1	0	0	1	0	2	0	0	4	9
Scotland (Wood)	0	0	0	2	0	1	0	2	0	0	5

Sheet C	1	2	3	4	5	6	7	8	9	10	Final
Japan (Tsuchiya)	1	0	0	5	0	1	0	0	0	0	7
Denmark (Jensen) 🔨	0	1	1	0	1	0	1	2	1	3	10

Sheet D	1	2	3	4	5	6	7	8	9	10	Final
Sweden (Norberg) 🔨	1	0	3	0	0	2	1	3	X	X	10
Italy (Gaspari)	0	1	0	2	0	0	0	0	X	X	3

=== Draw 12 ===
March 22, 09:00

Sheet A	1	2	3	4	5	6	7	8	9	10	Final
Japan (Tsuchiya)	0	0	0	1	0	0	2	0	1	1	5
Scotland (Wood) 🔨	0	0	2	0	2	1	0	1	0	0	6

Sheet B	1	2	3	4	5	6	7	8	9	10	Final
Sweden (Norberg)	2	0	2	0	2	0	2	2	3	X	13
Netherlands (Leibbrandt-Demmon) 🔨	0	1	0	1	0	2	0	0	0	X	4

Sheet C	1	2	3	4	5	6	7	8	9	10	Final
Canada (Scott) 🔨	0	2	0	3	0	1	0	1	0	1	8
Italy (Gaspari)	0	0	1	0	2	0	2	0	1	0	6

Sheet D	1	2	3	4	5	6	7	8	9	10	Final
Germany (Schöpp) 🔨	0	0	1	0	2	0	0	4	1	0	8
Denmark (Jensen)	0	0	0	2	0	2	1	0	0	1	6

=== Draw 13 ===
March 22, 14:00

Sheet A	1	2	3	4	5	6	7	8	9	10	Final
Denmark (Jensen)	0	1	1	1	1	0	2	0	1	2	9
Switzerland (Tirinzoni) 🔨	1	0	0	0	0	1	0	3	0	0	5

Sheet B	1	2	3	4	5	6	7	8	9	10	Final
Italy (Gaspari)	0	2	2	0	0	1	0	0	2	0	7
United States (McCormick) 🔨	2	0	0	2	2	0	1	2	0	0	9

Sheet C	1	2	3	4	5	6	7	8	9	10	Final
Netherlands (Leibbrandt-Demmon)	0	1	0	0	1	0	1	0	0	X	3
China (Wang) 🔨	1	0	3	0	0	1	0	3	3	X	11

Sheet D	1	2	3	4	5	6	7	8	9	10	Final
Scotland (Wood)	0	0	2	0	1	0	X	X	X	X	3
Norway (Nordby) 🔨	0	3	0	4	0	3	X	X	X	X	10

=== Draw 14 ===
March 22, 19:30

Sheet A	1	2	3	4	5	6	7	8	9	10	Final
China (Wang) 🔨	0	2	0	0	1	0	1	0	1	0	5
Sweden (Norberg)	0	0	0	2	0	2	0	1	0	1	6

Sheet B	1	2	3	4	5	6	7	8	9	10	Final
Norway (Nordby) 🔨	2	0	0	1	0	0	0	1	0	1	5
Japan (Tsuchiya)	0	2	0	0	1	1	1	0	2	0	7

Sheet C	1	2	3	4	5	6	7	8	9	10	Final
Switzerland (Tirinzoni)	0	1	0	0	1	0	1	0	X	X	3
Germany (Schöpp) 🔨	1	0	3	2	0	1	0	3	X	X	10

Sheet D	1	2	3	4	5	6	7	8	9	10	Final
United States (McCormick) 🔨	1	1	0	0	0	2	1	0	0	1	6
Canada (Scott)	0	0	0	1	0	0	0	1	0	0	2

=== Draw 15 ===
March 23, 10:30

Sheet A	1	2	3	4	5	6	7	8	9	10	Final
Germany (Schöpp)	0	0	0	4	2	0	0	2	0	0	8
Italy (Gaspari) 🔨	1	0	1	0	0	0	1	0	2	2	7

Sheet B	1	2	3	4	5	6	7	8	9	10	Final
Canada (Scott) 🔨	2	0	2	0	0	0	2	0	2	1	9
Denmark (Jensen)	0	2	0	1	3	4	0	1	0	0	11

Sheet C	1	2	3	4	5	6	7	8	9	10	11	Final
Sweden (Norberg)	0	0	2	0	0	1	0	1	0	1	0	5
Scotland (Wood) 🔨	0	1	0	1	1	0	1	0	1	0	1	6

Sheet D	1	2	3	4	5	6	7	8	9	10	Final
Japan (Tsuchiya) 🔨	0	0	0	1	0	5	1	1	X	X	8
Netherlands (Leibbrandt-Demmon)	0	0	0	0	1	0	0	0	X	X	1

=== Draw 16 ===
March 23, 13:00

Sheet A	1	2	3	4	5	6	7	8	9	10	Final
Netherlands (Leibbrandt-Demmon) 🔨	1	0	0	0	1	0	0	1	0	0	3
United States (McCormick)	0	0	1	1	0	0	2	0	3	3	10

Sheet B	1	2	3	4	5	6	7	8	9	10	Final
Scotland (Wood)	0	0	2	0	1	1	0	0	1	0	5
Switzerland (Tirinzoni)	1	0	0	1	0	0	2	1	0	2	7

Sheet C	1	2	3	4	5	6	7	8	9	10	Final
Denmark (Jensen) 🔨	0	0	3	0	0	2	0	1	0	0	6
Norway (Nordby)	0	0	0	1	1	0	3	0	1	3	9

Sheet D	1	2	3	4	5	6	7	8	9	10	Final
Italy (Gaspari) 🔨	1	0	0	1	0	1	0	1	2	0	6
China (Wang)	0	0	2	0	2	0	2	0	0	3	9

=== Draw 17 ===
March 23, 18:30

Sheet A	1	2	3	4	5	6	7	8	9	10	11	Final
Norway (Nordby) 🔨	1	0	1	2	2	0	0	2	0	0	0	8
Canada (Scott)	0	2	0	0	0	0	2	0	3	1	1	9

Sheet B	1	2	3	4	5	6	7	8	9	10	Final
China (Wang) 🔨	1	1	0	0	1	0	0	1	1	0	5
Germany (Schöpp)	0	0	1	2	0	3	1	0	0	2	9

Sheet C	1	2	3	4	5	6	7	8	9	10	Final
United States (McCormick)	0	1	2	2	0	2	0	2	2	1	12
Japan (Tsuchiya) 🔨	3	0	0	0	1	0	3	0	0	0	7

Sheet D	1	2	3	4	5	6	7	8	9	10	Final
Switzerland (Tirinzoni)	0	1	0	0	0	1	0	X	X	X	2
Sweden (Norberg) 🔨	2	0	3	1	0	0	4	X	X	X	10

== Playoffs ==
Page playoff system
1	Sweden	8
2	United States	5
3	Germany	4
4	Canada	8

Semifinal
2	United States	8
4	Canada	7

Final
1	Sweden	10
2	United States	9

=== 1 vs. 2 game ===
March 24, 13:00

Sheet B	1	2	3	4	5	6	7	8	9	10	Final
United States (McCormick)	0	0	0	2	0	0	2	0	1	0	5
Sweden (Norberg) 🔨	0	1	3	0	1	2	0	1	0	0	8

Player Percentages
United States		Sweden	
Natalie Nicholson	88%	Anna Svärd	77%
Nicole Joraanstad	73%	Cathrine Lindahl	83%
Allison Pottinger	66%	Eva Lund	84%
Debbie McCormick	76%	Anette Norberg	77%
Total	76%	Total	80%

=== 3 vs. 4 game ===
March 24, 19:30

Sheet B	1	2	3	4	5	6	7	8	9	10	Final
Canada (Scott) 🔨	1	0	0	0	2	0	2	0	1	2	8
Germany (Schöpp)	0	2	0	0	0	1	0	1	0	0	4

Player Percentages
Canada		Germany	
Renee Simons	85%	Marie-Therese Rotter	76%
Sasha Carter	79%	Anna Hartelt	71%
Jeanna Schraeder	86%	Monika Wagner	80%
Kelly Scott	79%	Andrea Schöpp	74%
Total	82%	Total	75%

=== Semifinal ===
March 25, 09:30

Sheet B	1	2	3	4	5	6	7	8	9	10	Final
Canada (Scott)	0	2	1	0	0	1	0	2	1	0	7
United States (McCormick) 🔨	3	0	0	2	0	0	1	0	0	2	8

Player Percentages
United States		Canada	
Natalie Nicholson	84%	Renee Simons	81%
Nicole Joraanstad	78%	Sasha Carter	74%
Allison Pottinger	75%	Jeanna Schraeder	84%
Debbie McCormick	73%	Kelly Scott	75%
Total	77%	Total	78%

=== Final ===
March 26, 10:30

Sheet B	1	2	3	4	5	6	7	8	9	10	Final
Sweden (Norberg) 🔨	1	0	2	0	3	1	0	2	0	1	10
United States (McCormick)	0	1	0	4	0	0	2	0	2	0	9

Player Percentages
United States		Sweden	
Natalie Nicholson	88%	Anna Svärd	86%
Nicole Joraanstad	80%	Cathrine Lindahl	76%
Allison Pottinger	83%	Eva Lund	79%
Debbie McCormick	75%	Anette Norberg	76%
Total	81%	Total	79%

== Round-robin player percentages ==
Leads	%	Seconds	%	Thirds	%	Skips	%
(United States) Natalie Nicholson	87	(Sweden) Cathrine Lindahl	84	(Sweden) Eva Lund	85	(Sweden) Anette Norberg	85
(Sweden) Anna Svärd	86	(United States) Nicole Joraanstad	83	(Canada) Jeanna Schraeder	82	(United States) Debbie McCormick	83
(Canada) Renee Simons	85	(China) Yue Qingshuang	78	(United States) Allison Pottinger	82	(Canada) Kelly Scott	81
(Switzerland) Esther Neuenschwander	81	(Canada) Sasha Carter	77	(China) Liu Yin	80	(Germany) Andrea Schöpp	78
(Italy) Violetta Caldart	80	(Scotland) Kim Brewster	76	(Norway) Marianne Haslum	75	(China) Wang Bingyu	76
