= St. Andrews, Nova Scotia =

Community in Nova Scotia, Canada

Coordinates: 45°33′17.75″N 61°53′18.2″W

St. Andrews in Nova Scotia

St. Andrews (Gaelic: Cill Rìbhinn) is a rural suburban community in the Canadian province of Nova Scotia, in Antigonish County. It is situated a fifteen minutes' drive from the Town of Antigonish in an area of rural hilly terrain. The community has grown in recent years and has a reputation for its cooperative community spirit, and was recognized for its character by a 2009 Lieutenant Governor's Community Spirit Award. Community effort has resulted in the addition of several new facilities including a curling rink, seniors complex, community centre, and numerous other projects.

== Services ==
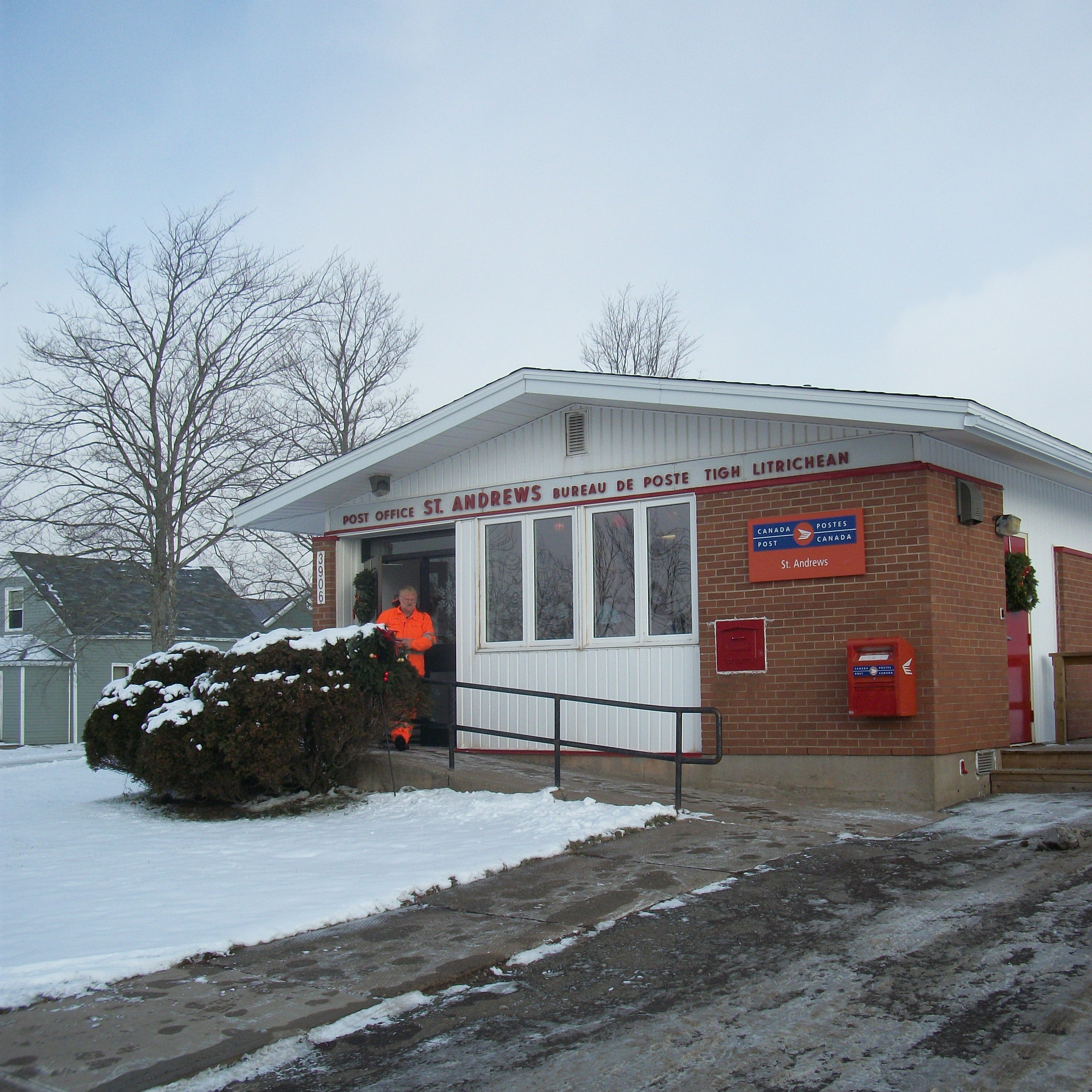
The post office in St. Andrews has tri-lingual signage

There is a post office, small elementary school with playground equipment, a baseball field, a soccer field, and a pond (for hockey and skating in the winter). A curling rink that hosts several leagues, competitions and events. Community center, walking trail, volunteer fire department, Roman Catholic church.
