= 2018 British Columbia Scotties Tournament of Hearts =

Provincial women's curling championship

2018 BC Scotties
- Host city: Victoria, British Columbia
- Arena: Victoria Curling Club
- Dates: January 2–7
- Winner: Team Van Osch
- Curling club: Nanaimo CC, Nanaimo
- Skip: Kesa Van Osch
- Third: Marika Van Osch
- Second: Kalia Van Osch
- Lead: Amy Gibson
- Finalist: Karla Thompson

The 2018 British Columbia Scotties Tournament of Hearts, the provincial women's curling championship for British Columbia, was held January 2–7 at the Victoria Curling Club in Victoria, British Columbia. The winning Kesa Van Osch team represented British Columbia at the 2018 Scotties Tournament of Hearts.

== Qualification Process ==
Qualification method	Berths	Qualifying team
CTRS Leaders	2	Corryn Brown; Diane Gushulak
Open Event #1	3	Kim Slattery; Karla Thompson; Holly Donaldson
Open Event #2	3	Randi Ludwar; Kayte Gyles; Kesa Van Osch

== Teams ==
The teams were listed as follows:

Skip	Third	Second	Lead	Alternate	Club(s)
Corryn Brown	Erin Pincott	Dezaray Hawes	Samantha Fisher		Kamloops / Royal City
Holly Donaldson	Steph Jackson-Baier	Lindsay Hudyma	Carley Sandwith		Vancouver / Victoria
Diane Gushulak	Grace MacInnes	Jessie Sanderson	Sandra Comadina	Ashley Sanderson	Royal City / Vancouver
Kayte Gyles	Shawna Jensen	Caitlin Campbell	Amanda Tipper		Royal City / Cloverdale
Randi Ludwar	Lori Seemann	Erinn Bartlett	Jill Mcintyre		Kelowna
Alyssa Kyllo	Kelsi Jones	Morgayne Eby	Kim Slattery (skip)		Vernon
Karla Thompson	Kristen Recksiedler	Shannon Joanisse	Trysta Vandale	Diane Dezura	Kamloops / Golden Ears
Kesa Van Osch	Marika Van Osch	Kalia Van Osch	Amy Gibson		Nanaimo

== Round-robin standings ==
Key
Teams to Playoffs
Teams to Tiebreakers

	W	L
Karla Thompson	6	1
Kesa Van Osch	5	2
Corryn Brown	5	2
Diane Gushulak	5	2
Kim Slattery	3	4
Holly Donaldson	2	5
Kayte Gyles	1	6
Randi Ludwar	1	6

=== January 2 ===
Draw 1

- Brown 7-5 Donaldson
- Gushulak 10-3 Ludwar
- Slattery 8-7 Gyles
- Thompson 8-5 Van Osch

=== January 3 ===
Draw 2

- Thompson 7-4 Ludwar
- Donaldson 6-5 Slattery
- Van Osch 7-6 Gushulak
- Brown 5-4 Gyles

Draw 3

- Van Osch 5-4 Donaldson
- Gushulak 6-5 Gyles
- Thompson 6-5 Brown
- Slattery 9-4 Ludwar

=== January 4 ===
Draw 4

- Slattery 2-5 Gushulak
- Van Osch 1-8 Brown
- Gyles 5-4 Ludwar
- Thompson 10-7 Donaldson

Draw 5

- Brown 11-3 Ludwar
- Thompson 8-2 Gyles
- Gushulak 8-4 Donaldson
- Van Osch 6-3 Slattery

=== January 5 ===
Draw 6

- Van Osch 8-3 Gyles
- Donaldson 5-6 Ludwar
- Thompson 4-5 Slattery
- Brown 4-9 Gushulak

Draw 7

- Gushulak 6-7 Thompson
- Brown 10-3 Slattery
- Ludwar 4-9 Van Osch
- Donaldson 7-4 Gyles

== Playoffs ==
Page playoff system
1	Karla Thompson	4
2	Kesa Van Osch	10
3	Corryn Brown	7
4	Diane Gushulak	6

Semifinal
1	Karla Thompson	5
3	Corryn Brown	3

Final
2	Kesa Van Osch	11
1	Karla Thompson	4

=== 1 vs. 2 ===
January 6, 2:00pm

Sheet D	1	2	3	4	5	6	7	8	9	10	Final
Karla Thompson	1	0	0	2	0	0	1	0	X	X	4
Kesa Van Osch	0	2	4	0	2	1	0	1	X	X	10

=== 3 vs. 4 ===
January 6, 9:00pm

Sheet D	1	2	3	4	5	6	7	8	9	10	Final
Corryn Brown	2	0	1	0	0	2	0	2	0	0	7
Diane Gushulak	0	1	0	2	0	0	1	0	1	1	6

=== Semifinal ===
January 7, 11:00am

Sheet D	1	2	3	4	5	6	7	8	9	10	Final
Karla Thompson	0	1	0	0	1	0	0	0	2	1	5
Corryn Brown	0	0	0	1	0	0	1	1	0	0	3

=== Final ===
January 7, 4:00pm

Sheet D	1	2	3	4	5	6	7	8	9	10	Final
Kesa Van Osch	3	0	0	2	0	1	1	2	2	X	11
Karla Thompson	0	2	1	0	1	0	0	0	0	X	4

2018 British Columbia Scotties Tournament of Hearts

Kesa Van Osch
2nd British Columbia Provincial Championship title
