= 2019 British Columbia Scotties Tournament of Hearts =

Provincial women's curling championship

2019 Scotties BC Women's Curling Championship presented by Best Western and Nufloors
- Host city: Quesnel, British Columbia
- Arena: West Fraser Centre
- Dates: January 29–February 3
- Winner: Team Wark
- Curling club: Abbotsford CC, Abbotsford
- Skip: Sarah Wark
- Third: Kristen Pilote
- Second: Carley Sandwith
- Lead: Michelle Dunn
- Alternate: Jen Rusnell
- Coach: Rick Fewster
- Finalist: Corryn Brown

The 2019 Scotties BC Women's Curling Championship presented by Best Western and Nufloors, the provincial women's curling championship for British Columbia, was held January 29 to February 3 at the West Fraser Centre in Quesnel. The winning Sarah Wark team represented British Columbia at the 2019 Scotties Tournament of Hearts in Sydney, Nova Scotia.

== Qualification ==
Qualification method	Berths	Qualifying team(s)
Defending champion	1	Kesa Van Osch
CTRS leader	1	Corryn Brown
BC Tour	2	Sarah Wark; Diane Gushulak
Open #1	2	Kim Slattery; Lindsay Hudyma
Open #2	2	Brette Richards; Karla Thompson

== Teams ==
The teams were listed as follows:

Skip	Third	Second	Lead	Club(s)
Corryn Brown	Erin Pincott	Dezaray Hawes	Ashley Klymchuk	Kamloops/Royal City
Diane Gushulak	Grace MacInnes	Jessie Sanderson	Ashley Sanderson	Royal City
Lindsay Hudyma	Heather Hansen	Jenna Duncan	Patty Wallingham	Vancouver
Brette Richards	Blaine de Jager	Steph Jackson Baier	Heather Tyre	Kelowna/Victoria/Prince George
Alyssa Kylo (Fourth)	Kelsi Jones	Morgayne Eby	Kim Slattery (Skip)	Vernon
Karla Thompson	Holly Donaldson	Megan Daniels	Cassie Savage	Kamloops
Kesa Van Osch	Kalia Van Osch	Marika Van Osch	Amy Gibson	Nanaimo/Parksville
Sarah Wark	Kristen Pilote	Carley Sandwith	Michelle Dunn	Abbotsford

== Round robin standings ==
Key
Teams to playoffs

Skip	W	L
Sarah Wark	6	1
Corryn Brown	5	2
Lindsay Hudyma	4	3
Brette Richards	4	3
Diane Gushulak	3	4
Karla Thompson	3	4
Kesa Van Osch	2	5
Kim Slattery	1	6

== Round robin results ==
All draw times are listed in Pacific Standard Time (UTC-08:00)

=== Draw 1 ===
Tuesday, January 29, 9:00am

Sheet A	1	2	3	4	5	6	7	8	9	10	Final
Kesa Van Osch	2	1	0	0	0	0	0	2	0	0	5
Karla Thompson	0	0	0	1	1	0	3	0	0	1	6

Sheet C	1	2	3	4	5	6	7	8	9	10	Final
Diane Gushulak	0	1	0	1	0	1	0	1	0	X	4
Kim Slattery	2	0	1	0	0	0	2	0	3	X	8

=== Draw 2 ===
Tuesday, January 29, 2:00pm

Sheet C	1	2	3	4	5	6	7	8	9	10	11	Final
Lindsay Hudyma	0	0	0	1	0	0	2	1	0	1	0	5
Sarah Wark	0	0	1	0	1	2	0	0	1	0	1	6

Sheet D	1	2	3	4	5	6	7	8	9	10	Final
Corryn Brown	1	0	0	3	0	1	0	2	0	1	8
Brette Richards	0	0	1	0	2	0	1	0	1	0	5

=== Draw 3 ===
Tuesday, January 29, 7:30pm

Sheet B	1	2	3	4	5	6	7	8	9	10	Final
Kim Slattery	0	1	2	0	0	2	0	0	2	0	7
Sarah Wark	2	0	0	1	2	0	3	0	0	0	8

Sheet C	1	2	3	4	5	6	7	8	9	10	Final
Kesa Van Osch	0	0	2	0	1	0	0	1	2	0	6
Brette Richards	2	1	0	1	0	0	2	0	0	1	7

Sheet D	1	2	3	4	5	6	7	8	9	10	Final
Diane Gushulak	0	0	0	3	2	0	2	0	0	0	7
Lindsay Hudyma	1	1	1	0	0	1	0	1	1	2	8

=== Draw 4 ===
Wednesday, January 30, 9:00am

Sheet C	1	2	3	4	5	6	7	8	9	10	Final
Karla Thompson	0	1	0	3	0	0	0	1	1	1	7
Corryn Brown	1	0	1	0	1	1	2	0	0	0	6

=== Draw 5 ===
Wednesday, January 30, 2:00pm

Sheet A	1	2	3	4	5	6	7	8	9	10	Final
Kim Slattery	0	0	0	1	0	1	1	0	1	1	5
Corryn Brown	0	1	2	0	2	0	0	1	0	0	6

Sheet D	1	2	3	4	5	6	7	8	9	10	Final
Sarah Wark	1	0	5	0	0	0	0	1	0	2	9
Kesa Van Osch	0	2	0	0	1	3	0	0	1	0	7

Sheet E	1	2	3	4	5	6	7	8	9	10	Final
Karla Thompson	0	2	1	0	1	0	2	0	0	0	6
Diane Gushulak	2	0	0	2	0	2	0	1	1	3	11

=== Draw 6 ===
Wednesday, January 30, 7:00pm

Sheet A	1	2	3	4	5	6	7	8	9	10	11	Final
Brette Richards	2	0	0	1	0	0	1	0	0	2	1	7
Sarah Wark	0	2	0	0	2	0	0	1	1	0	0	6

Sheet B	1	2	3	4	5	6	7	8	9	10	Final
Lindsay Hudyma	1	0	1	1	0	0	0	1	0	X	4
Kesa Van Osch	0	3	0	0	0	2	0	0	1	X	6

=== Draw 7 ===
Thursday, January 31, 9:00am

Sheet A	1	2	3	4	5	6	7	8	9	10	Final
Diane Gushulak	0	0	0	0	0	2	0	1	0	3	6
Kesa Van Osch	0	1	0	0	2	0	1	0	1	0	5

Sheet B	1	2	3	4	5	6	7	8	9	10	11	Final
Karla Thompson	1	0	1	2	0	0	0	0	0	1	0	5
Brette Richards	0	3	0	0	0	0	0	2	0	0	1	6

Sheet C	1	2	3	4	5	6	7	8	9	10	Final
Kim Slattery	0	0	2	0	1	0	1	1	0	0	5
Lindsay Hudyma	0	1	0	2	0	1	0	0	2	1	7

Sheet E	1	2	3	4	5	6	7	8	9	10	Final
Corryn Brown	2	0	0	0	2	0	0	1	0	X	5
Sarah Wark	0	2	1	1	0	2	1	0	1	X	8

=== Draw 9 ===
Thursday, January 31, 7:00pm

Sheet B	1	2	3	4	5	6	7	8	9	10	11	Final
Corryn Brown	0	1	1	0	0	3	0	1	0	0	1	7
Lindsay Hudyma	1	0	0	1	1	0	2	0	0	1	0	6

Sheet C	1	2	3	4	5	6	7	8	9	10	Final
Sarah Wark	1	0	1	0	1	0	0	2	0	3	8
Karla Thompson	0	1	0	1	0	0	2	0	2	0	6

Sheet D	1	2	3	4	5	6	7	8	9	10	Final
Brette Richards	0	0	0	2	0	3	0	0	1	0	6
Diane Gushulak	1	0	1	0	1	0	2	1	0	1	7

Sheet E	1	2	3	4	5	6	7	8	9	10	Final
Kesa Van Osch	1	0	2	0	2	0	1	0	2	X	8
Kim Slattery	0	1	0	2	0	1	0	1	0	X	5

=== Draw 10 ===
Friday, February 1, 9:00am

Sheet A	1	2	3	4	5	6	7	8	9	10	Final
Karla Thompson	0	1	0	2	0	0	0	0	1	X	4
Lindsay Hudyma	1	0	2	0	1	2	1	1	0	X	8

Sheet B	1	2	3	4	5	6	7	8	9	10	Final
Brette Richards	2	0	3	0	0	1	0	0	4	X	10
Kim Slattery	0	4	0	1	1	0	0	1	0	X	7

Sheet E	1	2	3	4	5	6	7	8	9	10	11	Final
Diane Gushulak	0	1	0	2	0	0	0	1	0	2	0	6
Corryn Brown	3	0	0	0	0	1	0	0	2	0	1	7

=== Draw 11 ===
Friday, February 1, 2:00pm

Sheet B	1	2	3	4	5	6	7	8	9	10	Final
Sarah Wark	2	1	0	1	0	1	0	1	0	1	7
Diane Gushulak	0	0	2	0	1	0	1	0	1	0	5

Sheet C	1	2	3	4	5	6	7	8	9	10	11	Final
Corryn Brown	0	3	1	0	0	1	0	0	1	1	1	8
Kesa Van Osch	2	0	0	1	1	0	2	1	0	0	0	7

Sheet D	1	2	3	4	5	6	7	8	9	10	Final
Kim Slattery	1	0	0	0	0	1	0	0	X	X	2
Karla Thompson	0	0	2	1	2	0	1	2	X	X	8

Sheet E	1	2	3	4	5	6	7	8	9	10	11	Final
Lindsay Hudyma	0	2	0	0	0	2	0	2	0	0	1	7
Brette Richards	1	0	0	1	1	0	1	0	1	1	0	6

== Playoffs ==
Page playoff system
1	Sarah Wark	8
2	Corryn Brown	6
3	Lindsay Hudyma	5
4	Brette Richards	8

Semifinal
2	Corryn Brown	6
4	Brette Richards	4

Final
1	Sarah Wark	7
2	Corryn Brown	4

=== 1 vs. 2 ===
Saturday, February 2, 9:00am

Sheet C	1	2	3	4	5	6	7	8	9	10	Final
Sarah Wark	3	0	1	0	1	0	0	0	1	2	8
Corryn Brown	0	1	0	3	0	1	1	0	0	0	6

=== 3 vs. 4 ===
Saturday, February 2, 2:00pm

Sheet C	1	2	3	4	5	6	7	8	9	10	Final
Lindsay Hudyma	0	0	1	0	1	0	0	0	3	X	5
Brette Richards	1	1	0	1	0	3	1	1	0	X	8

=== Semifinal ===
Saturday, February 2, 7:00pm

Sheet C	1	2	3	4	5	6	7	8	9	10	Final
Corryn Brown	0	2	0	1	0	0	0	2	0	1	6
Brette Richards	0	0	2	0	0	1	0	0	1	0	4

=== Final ===
Sunday, February 3, 2:00pm

Sheet C	1	2	3	4	5	6	7	8	9	10	Final
Sarah Wark	2	0	0	2	0	2	0	1	0	X	7
Corryn Brown	0	1	0	0	0	0	1	0	2	X	4

2019 British Columbia Scotties Tournament of Hearts

Sarah Wark
1st British Columbia Provincial Championship title
