= 2020 British Columbia Scotties Tournament of Hearts =

Provincial women's curling championship

2020 Scotties BC Women's Curling Championship presented by Best Western
- Host city: Cranbrook, British Columbia
- Arena: Western Financial Place
- Dates: January 28 – February 2
- Winner: Team Brown
- Curling club: Kamloops CC, Kamloops & Royal City CC, New Westminster
- Skip: Corryn Brown
- Third: Erin Pincott
- Second: Dezaray Hawes
- Lead: Ashley Klymchuk
- Coach: Allison MacInnes
- Finalist: Sarah Wark

The 2020 Scotties BC Women's Curling Championship, the provincial women's curling championship for British Columbia, was held from January 28 – February 2 at Western Financial Place in Cranbrook, British Columbia. The winning Corryn Brown rink represented British Columbia at the 2020 Scotties Tournament of Hearts in Moose Jaw, Saskatchewan and finished with a 5–6 record. The event was held in conjunction with the 2020 BC Men's Curling Championship, the provincial men's championship.

Corryn Brown won her first British Columbia Scotties Tournament of Hearts with a steal in the extra end to defeat the Sarah Wark rink.

== Qualification process ==
Qualification	Berths	Qualifying team(s)
Defending champion	1	Sarah Wark
CTRS leader	1	Corryn Brown
BC Tour	2	Karla Thompson; Brette Richards
Open #1	2	Dailene Pewarchuk; Kim Slattery
Open #2	2	Sarah Daniels; Diane Gushulak

== Teams ==
The teams are listed as follows:

Skip	Third	Second	Lead	Club(s)
Corryn Brown	Erin Pincott	Dezaray Hawes	Ashley Klymchuk	Kamloops / Royal City
Sarah Daniels	Kayla MacMillan	Holly Horvat	Sarah Loken	Delta Thistle
Diane Gushulak	Grace MacInnes	Megan McGillivray	Sandra Comadina	Royal City / Kelowna / Vancouver
Dailene Pewarchuk	Taylor Reese-Hansen	Ashley Sanderson	Sydney Brilz	Victoria
Brette Richards	Blaine de Jager	Steph Jackson-Baier	Rachelle Kallechy	Kelowna / Prince George / Victoria
Alyssa Kylo (Fourth)	Shiella Cowan	Shaina McGivern	Kim Slattery (Skip)	Vernon
Karla Thompson	Jody Brennan	Amanda Guido	Lanette Nordick	Kamloops
Sarah Wark	Kristen Pilote	Carley Sandwith	Jen Rusnell	Abbotsford

== Round-robin standings ==
Final round-robin standings

Key
Teams to Playoffs

Skip	W	L
Sarah Wark	6	1
Corryn Brown	5	2
Sarah Daniels	4	3
Brette Richards	4	3
Kim Slattery	3	4
Karla Thompson	3	4
Diane Gushulak	2	5
Dailene Pewarchuk	1	6

== Round-robin results ==
All draws are listed in Mountain Time (UTC−07:00).

=== Draw 1 ===
Tuesday, January 28, 9:00 am

Sheet 4	1	2	3	4	5	6	7	8	9	10	Final
Dailene Pewarchuk	0	0	0	3	1	0	0	0	0	X	4
Corryn Brown	0	1	0	0	0	2	2	3	1	X	9

=== Draw 2 ===
Tuesday, January 28, 2:00 pm

Sheet 1	1	2	3	4	5	6	7	8	9	10	11	Final
Brette Richards	0	0	2	1	0	2	0	0	0	2	0	7
Sarah Daniels	0	1	0	0	2	0	1	1	2	0	2	9

Sheet 2	1	2	3	4	5	6	7	8	9	10	Final
Karla Thompson	0	0	2	0	1	3	0	1	0	0	7
Kim Slattery	0	1	0	2	0	0	2	0	2	2	9

Sheet 3	1	2	3	4	5	6	7	8	9	10	Final
Sarah Wark	0	0	2	0	0	1	1	2	0	1	7
Diane Gushulak	0	2	0	1	1	0	0	0	2	0	6

=== Draw 3 ===
Tuesday, January 28, 7:00 pm

Sheet 1	1	2	3	4	5	6	7	8	9	10	Final
Kim Slattery	0	0	1	0	1	0	1	0	1	0	4
Sarah Wark	1	1	0	2	0	1	0	1	0	1	7

Sheet 2	1	2	3	4	5	6	7	8	9	10	Final
Dailene Pewarchuk	0	0	2	0	1	0	0	1	0	0	4
Brette Richards	0	1	0	1	0	0	1	0	2	4	9

Sheet 3	1	2	3	4	5	6	7	8	9	10	Final
Sarah Daniels	0	1	0	2	0	3	1	2	0	2	11
Corryn Brown	1	0	2	0	2	0	0	0	2	0	7

=== Draw 5 ===
Wednesday, January 29, 12:00 pm

Sheet 1	1	2	3	4	5	6	7	8	9	10	Final
Diane Gushulak	0	2	0	1	0	0	1	0	1	0	5
Brette Richards	1	0	2	0	1	0	0	1	0	1	6

Sheet 2	1	2	3	4	5	6	7	8	9	10	Final
Sarah Daniels	0	0	0	2	0	0	1	2	0	0	5
Karla Thompson	0	2	1	0	1	1	0	0	2	1	8

Sheet 4	1	2	3	4	5	6	7	8	9	10	Final
Corryn Brown	3	3	1	3	1	X	X	X	X	X	11
Kim Slattery	0	0	0	0	0	X	X	X	X	X	0

Sheet 5	1	2	3	4	5	6	7	8	9	10	11	Final
Sarah Wark	1	0	0	2	0	0	3	0	1	0	1	8
Dailene Pewarchuk	0	1	0	0	2	2	0	2	0	0	0	7

=== Draw 7 ===
Wednesday, January 29, 8:00 pm

Sheet 1	1	2	3	4	5	6	7	8	9	10	Final
Dailene Pewarchuk	1	0	1	0	1	0	1	0	1	X	5
Kim Slattery	0	0	0	4	0	4	0	1	0	X	9

Sheet 2	1	2	3	4	5	6	7	8	9	10	Final
Corryn Brown	0	1	2	0	0	2	0	0	1	2	8
Sarah Wark	0	0	0	1	1	0	2	1	0	0	5

Sheet 3	1	2	3	4	5	6	7	8	9	10	Final
Karla Thompson	0	0	0	1	0	0	1	0	X	X	2
Brette Richards	1	0	1	0	1	4	0	2	X	X	9

Sheet 5	1	2	3	4	5	6	7	8	9	10	Final
Diane Gushulak	0	3	0	0	0	2	0	1	0	1	7
Sarah Daniels	0	0	1	1	1	0	2	0	1	0	6

=== Draw 9 ===
Thursday, January 30, 12:00 pm

Sheet 2	1	2	3	4	5	6	7	8	9	10	Final
Diane Gushulak	0	0	2	0	2	4	1	0	X	X	9
Dailene Pewarchuk	1	1	0	1	0	0	0	1	X	X	4

Sheet 3	1	2	3	4	5	6	7	8	9	10	Final
Kim Slattery	1	0	2	0	0	1	0	1	0	X	5
Sarah Daniels	0	2	0	2	2	0	1	0	3	X	10

Sheet 4	1	2	3	4	5	6	7	8	9	10	Final
Brette Richards	2	0	0	2	0	1	0	1	1	0	7
Sarah Wark	0	2	1	0	1	0	3	0	0	1	8

Sheet 5	1	2	3	4	5	6	7	8	9	10	Final
Corryn Brown	2	0	1	0	0	0	0	X	X	X	3
Karla Thompson	0	2	0	2	1	1	2	X	X	X	8

=== Draw 10 ===
Thursday, January 30, 4:00 pm

Sheet 1	1	2	3	4	5	6	7	8	9	10	Final
Corryn Brown	1	0	3	2	0	1	1	1	X	X	9
Diane Gushulak	0	3	0	0	1	0	0	0	X	X	4

Sheet 3	1	2	3	4	5	6	7	8	9	10	Final
Dailene Pewarchuk	0	1	0	0	1	3	1	4	X	X	10
Karla Thompson	2	0	1	1	0	0	0	0	X	X	4

=== Draw 11 ===
Thursday, January 30, 8:00 pm

Sheet 2	1	2	3	4	5	6	7	8	9	10	11	Final
Sarah Wark	3	0	0	0	0	4	0	2	0	0	1	10
Sarah Daniels	0	1	1	1	1	0	1	0	3	1	0	9

Sheet 5	1	2	3	4	5	6	7	8	9	10	Final
Kim Slattery	1	0	0	0	0	1	0	X	X	X	2
Brette Richards	0	2	1	2	3	0	1	X	X	X	9

=== Draw 12 ===
Friday, January 31, 9:00 am

Sheet 4	1	2	3	4	5	6	7	8	9	10	Final
Karla Thompson	1	0	0	1	0	0	1	1	0	0	4
Diane Gushulak	0	1	0	0	0	0	0	0	1	1	3

=== Draw 13 ===
Friday, January 31, 2:00 pm

Sheet 1	1	2	3	4	5	6	7	8	9	10	Final
Sarah Wark	1	1	0	2	0	2	0	0	2	X	8
Karla Thompson	0	0	0	0	3	0	1	0	0	X	4

Sheet 2	1	2	3	4	5	6	7	8	9	10	Final
Brette Richards	0	0	2	0	0	0	X	X	X	X	2
Corryn Brown	3	1	0	2	1	2	X	X	X	X	9

Sheet 3	1	2	3	4	5	6	7	8	9	10	Final
Diane Gushulak	3	0	2	0	1	0	1	0	0	0	7
Kim Slattery	0	1	0	2	0	2	0	2	0	1	8

Sheet 4	1	2	3	4	5	6	7	8	9	10	Final
Sarah Daniels	2	0	2	0	2	3	X	X	X	X	9
Dailene Pewarchuk	0	1	0	0	0	0	X	X	X	X	1

== Playoffs ==
Page playoff system
1	Sarah Wark	6
2	Corryn Brown	4
3	Sarah Daniels	10
4	Brette Richards	5

Semifinal
2	Corryn Brown	11
3	Sarah Daniels	5

Final
1	Sarah Wark	7
2	Corryn Brown	8

=== 1 vs. 2 ===
Saturday, February 1, 2:00 pm

Sheet 2	1	2	3	4	5	6	7	8	9	10	Final
Sarah Wark	0	1	0	1	2	0	2	0	0	X	6
Corryn Brown	0	0	1	0	0	1	0	1	1	X	4

=== 3 vs. 4 ===
Saturday, February 1, 2:00 pm

Sheet 4	1	2	3	4	5	6	7	8	9	10	Final
Sarah Daniels	2	0	1	0	0	1	4	0	2	X	10
Brette Richards	0	1	0	0	1	0	0	3	0	X	5

=== Semifinal ===
Saturday, February 1, 7:00 pm

Sheet 3	1	2	3	4	5	6	7	8	9	10	Final
Corryn Brown	3	0	3	0	4	0	1	0	X	X	11
Sarah Daniels	0	1	0	1	0	1	0	2	X	X	5

=== Final ===
Sunday, February 2, 10:00 am

Sheet 3	1	2	3	4	5	6	7	8	9	10	11	Final
Sarah Wark	1	0	0	1	0	1	0	3	1	0	0	7
Corryn Brown	0	2	1	0	1	0	1	0	0	2	1	8

2020 British Columbia Scotties Tournament of Hearts

Corryn Brown
1st British Columbia Provincial Championship title

== Qualification ==
=== Open #1 ===
December 13–15, Abbotsford Curling Club, Abbotsford

A Event		Semifinals		To Provincials
Lindsay Hudyma (Vancouver)	8
Layna Pohlad (Delta Thistle)	5	Lindsay Hudyma (Vancouver)	5
Morgayne Eby (Vernon)	4	Dailene Pewarchuk (Victoria)	7
Dailene Pewarchuk (Victoria)	12			Dailene Pewarchuk (Victoria)	9
Sarah Daniels (Delta Thistle)	7			Sarah Daniels (Delta Thistle)	6
Kayte Gyles (New Westminster)	6	Sarah Daniels (Delta Thistle)	10
Kim Slattery (Vernon)	8	Kim Slattery (Vernon)	5
Diane Gushulak (New Westminster)	6

B Event
Layna Pohlad (Delta Thistle)	12
Morgayne Eby (Vernon)	10
Kayte Gyles (New Westminster)	5
Diane Gushulak (New Westminster)	11

Quarterfinals
Kim Slattery (Vernon)	9
Layna Pohlad (Delta Thistle)	3
Lindsay Hudyma (Vancouver)	6
Diane Gushulak (New Westminster)	8

Semifinals
Kim Slattery (Vernon)	5
Diane Gushulak (New Westminster)	4

To Provincials
Kim Slattery (Vernon)	7
Sarah Daniels (Delta Thistle)	5

=== Open #2 ===
January 4–5, Enderby Curling Club, Enderby

A Event
Diane Gushulak (New Westminster)	8
Kayte Gyles (New Westminster)	9
Morgayne Eby (Vernon)	6
Kelsey Powell (Vernon)	2

Semifinals
Lindsay Hudyma (Vancouver)	6
Kayte Gyles (New Westminster)	3
Sarah Daniels (Delta Thistle)	11
Morgayne Eby (Vernon)	5

To Provincials
Lindsay Hudyma (Vancouver)	4
Sarah Daniels (Delta Thistle)	10

B Event		Semifinals		To Provincials
Diane Gushulak (New Westminster)	W
Morgayne Eby (Vernon)	L	Diane Gushulak (New Westminster)	7
Kelsey Powell (Vernon)	W	Kelsey Powell (Vernon)	6
Kayte Gyles (New Westminster)	L			Diane Gushulak (New Westminster)	10
				Lindsay Hudyma (Vancouver)	7
