= King Cash Spiel =

Curling competition

- Established: 1981
- Host city: Maple Ridge, British Columbia
- Arena: Golden Ears Curling Club
- Men's purse: $12,800
- Women's purse: $9,600

Current champions (2025)
- Men: (British Columbia) Matthew Blandford
- Women: (Japan) Ikue Kitazawa

The King Cash Spiel, formerly the Golden Ears Curling Classic and the Coronation Group Classic, is an annual cashspiel, or curling tournament, that takes place at the Golden Ears Curling Club in Maple Ridge, British Columbia. The event has been on and off again as part of the World Curling Tour, and has been held since 1981. The tournament is held in a round robin format.

== Past champions ==
=== Men ===
| Year | Winning team | Runner up team | Purse (CAD) |
|---|---|---|---|
| 1981 | (British Columbia) Glen Pierce, Wayne Matthewson, Bruce Davey, Fuji Miki | (British Columbia) Glen Hillson | $30,000 |
| 1982 | (Saskatchewan) Rick Folk | (British Columbia) Keith Switzer | $38,000 |
| 1988 | (British Columbia) Terry Owen | (British Columbia) Steve Skillings | |
| 1991 | (British Columbia) Al Moore | (British Columbia) Brent Pierce | $15,000 |
| 1992 | (British Columbia) Brian Gessner | (British Columbia) Milt Sinclair | $23,000 |
| 1994 | (British Columbia) Al Moore, Ross Graham, Peter VanLeeuwen, Kieron Hunt | (British Columbia) Ed Dezura | $22,000 |
| 2013 | (British Columbia) Sean Geall, Ken Maskiewich, Sebastien Robillard, Kent Bird | (British Columbia) Kevin MacKenzie, Grant Dezura (skip), Jamie Smith, Kevin Recksiedler | $7,500 |
| 2014 | (British Columbia) Neil Dangerfield, Denis Sutton, Darren Boden, Glen Allen | (British Columbia) Sebastien Robillard, Tyler Klymchuk, Dylan Somerton, Chris Brezina | $6,900 |
| 2017 (Jan.) | (British Columbia) Dean Joanisse, Paul Cseke, Jay Wakefield, John Cullen | (United States) Lyle Sieg, Tom Violette, Ken Trask, Steve Lundeen | $3,000 |
| 2017 (Sept.) | (British Columbia) Sean Geall, Jeff Richard, Andrew Nerpin, David Harper | (British Columbia) Dean Joanisse, Paul Cseke, Jay Wakefield, John Cullen | $12,000 |
| 2018 | (British Columbia) Tyler Tardi, Sterling Middleton, Matthew Hall, Alex Horvath | (British Columbia) Josh Barry, Sebastien Robillard, Jay Wakefield, John Cullen | $9,600 |
| 2019 | (British Columbia) Sean Geall, Jared Kolomaya, Sebastien Robillard, Nicholas Meister | (British Columbia) Jim Cotter, Steve Laycock, Andrew Nerpin, Rick Sawatsky | $11,500 |
| 2020 | Cancelled | | |
| 2021 | (British Columbia) Sébastien Robillard, Bowie Abbis-Mills, Cody Tanaka, Nathan Small | (British Columbia) Dean Joanisse, Daniel Wenzek, Cody Johnston, Jeff Guignard | $11,400 |
| 2022 | (Japan) Riku Yanagisawa, Tsuyoshi Yamaguchi, Takeru Yamamoto, Satoshi Koizumi | (British Columbia) Brent Pierce, Jeff Richard, Jared Kolomaya, Nicholas Meister | $11,400 |
| 2023 | (British Columbia) Jason Montgomery, Chris Baier, Miles Craig, Troy Cowan | (British Columbia) Jeff Richard, Richard Krell, Daniel Wenzek, Connor Deane | $12,800 |
| 2024 | (British Columbia) Jason Montgomery, Chris Baier, Miles Craig, Troy Cowan | (British Columbia) Cameron de Jong, Corey Chester, Alex Horvath, Brayden Carpenter | $12,800 |
| 2025 | (British Columbia) Matthew Blandford, Sébastien Robillard, Cody Johnston, Matthew Fenton | (British Columbia) Jay Wakefield, Matthew McCrady, Chris Parkinson, Daniel Deng | $12,800 |

=== Women ===
| Year | Winning team | Runner up team | Purse (CAD) |
|---|---|---|---|
| 2013 | (British Columbia) Roberta Kuhn, Karla Thompson, Brooklyn Leitch, Michelle Ramsay | (British Columbia) Kalia Van Osch, Marika Van Osch, Sarah Daniels, Ashley Sanderson | $11,400 |
| 2014 | (British Columbia) Corryn Brown, Erin Pincott, Samantha Fisher, Sydney Fraser | (British Columbia) Kelly Scott, Shannon Aleksic, Karla Thompson, Sarah Pyke | $9,600 |
| 2015 | (British Columbia) Diane Gushulak, Grace MacInnes, Jessie Sanderson, Sandra Comadina | (British Columbia) Sarah Wark, Simone Brosseau, Michelle Allen, Rachelle Kallechy | $8,100 |
| 2017 (Jan.) | (British Columbia) Karla Thompson, Kristen Recksiedler, Erin Pincott, Trysta Vandale | (Alberta) Shannon Kleibrink, Lisa Eyamie, Sarah Wilkes, Alison Thiessen | $8,000 |
| 2017 (Sept.) | (British Columbia) Sarah Wark, Kristen Pilote, Stephanie Prinse, Michelle Dunn | (British Columbia) Kesa Van Osch, Marika Van Osch, Kalia Van Osch, Amy Gibson | $8,000 |
| 2018 | (British Columbia) Corryn Brown, Erin Pincott, Dezaray Hawes, Ashley Klymchuk | (British Columbia) Diane Gushulak, Grace MacInnes, Jessie Sanderson, Ashley Sanderson | $8,000 |
| 2019 | (British Columbia) Kristen Ryan, Shannon Joanisse, Megan Daniels, Dawn Mesana | (British Columbia) Sarah Daniels, Kayla MacMillan, Holly Horvat, Sarah Loken | $7,000 |
| 2020 | Cancelled | | |
| 2021 | (British Columbia) Taylor Reese-Hansen, Megan McGillivray, Cierra Fisher, Sydney Brilz | (British Columbia) Kristen Ryan, Megan Daniels, Kirsten Fox, Dawn Mesana | $5,700 |
| 2022 | (British Columbia) Stephanie Jackson-Baier, Kayla Wilson, Elizabeth Bowles, Carley Sandwith-Craig | (British Columbia) Shawna Jensen, Layna Pohlod, Sarah Wong, Amanda Wong | $5,700 |
| 2023 | (British Columbia) Holly Hafeli, Jorja Kopytko, Ella Casparis, Natalie Hafeli | (British Columbia) Kim Dennis, Layna Pohlod, Jessie Sanderson, Ashley Sanderson | $9,600 |
| 2024 | (British Columbia) Kristen Ryan, Shannon Joanisse, Megan Yamamoto, Kirsten Fox | (British Columbia) Shiella Cowan, Jody Maskiewich, Stephanie Whittaker-Kask, Sandra Comadina | $9,600 |
| 2025 | (Japan) Ikue Kitazawa, Seina Nakajima, Minori Suzuki, Hasumi Ishigooka, Ami Enami | (British Columbia) Kayla Wilson, Jorja Kopytko, Sarah Wong, Amanda Wong | $9,600 |
