= 2015 CIS/CCA Curling Championships =

- Host city: Waterloo, Ontario
- Arena: Kitchener-Waterloo Granite Club
- Dates: March 18–21
- Men's winner: Alberta Golden Bears
- Skip: Thomas Scoffin
- Third: Evan Asmussen
- Second: Jason Ginter
- Lead: Andrew O'Dell
- Finalist: (Ontario) Wilfrid Laurier Golden Hawks (Squires)
- Women's winner: Alberta Pandas
- Skip: Kelsey Rocque
- Third: Taylor McDonald
- Second: Claire Tully
- Lead: Alison Kotylak
- Finalist: (British Columbia) Thompson Rivers WolfPack (Brown)

The 2015 CIS/CCA Curling Championships are held from March 18 to 21 at the Kitchener-Waterloo Granite Club in Waterloo, Ontario. The host university of the event is Wilfrid Laurier University.

== Men ==
=== Teams ===
The teams are listed as follows:

Team	Skip	Third	Second	Lead	Alternate(s)	Coach	University
Alberta Golden Bears	Thomas Scoffin	Evan Asmussen	Jason Ginter	Andrew O'Dell	Brayden Power	Rob Krepps	University of Alberta
Dalhousie Tigers	Marc Gordon	Matt Jackson	Joseph Raymond	Ryan Holowczak	Patrick MacIntyre	John Newhook	(Nova Scotia) Dalhousie University
Saint Mary's Huskies	Cameron MacKenzie	Scott Babin	Alex Rafuse	Greg Rafuse	Graham Scott	Bill Fletcher	(Nova Scotia) Saint Mary's University
Toronto Varsity Blues	Evan Lilly	Jack Lindsay	Richard Seto	Pedro Malvar	Connor Rooney	John Rudd	(Ontario) University of Toronto
UNB Varsity Reds	Josh Barry	Andrew Burgess	Alex Robichaud	Alex Sutherland		Damien Lahiton	University of New Brunswick
Western Mustangs	Brett DeKoning	Aaron Chapman	Nathan Gonsalves	Derreck Veitch	Steven Dawson	Nicole Westlund	(Ontario) Western University
Wilfrid Laurier Golden Hawks	Aaron Squires	Richard Krell	Spencer Nuttall	Fraser Reid	Robert Wright	Glenn Paulley	(Ontario) Sir Wilfrid Laurier University
Winnipeg Wesmen	Kyle Doering	Ty Dilello	Derek Oryniak	Rob Gordon		Calvin Edie	(Manitoba) University of Winnipeg

=== Round-robin standings ===
Final round-robin standings

Key
Teams to Playoffs

Team	Skip	W	L
Alberta Golden Bears	Thomas Scoffin	7	0
(Ontario) Wilfrid Laurier Golden Hawks	Aaron Squires	6	1
(Nova Scotia) Saint Mary's Huskies	Cameron MacKenzie	4	3
(Manitoba) Winnipeg Wesmen	Kyle Doering	4	3
(Ontario) Toronto Varsity Blues	Evan Lilly	3	4
(Ontario) Western Mustangs	Brett DeKoning	2	5
(New Brunswick) UNB Varsity Reds	Josh Barry	1	6
(Nova Scotia) Dalhousie Tigers	Marc Gordon	1	6

=== Playoffs ===
Semifinal
1	Alberta Golden Bears	7
4	(Manitoba) Winnipeg Wesmen	1
2	(Ontario) Wilfrid Laurier Golden Hawks	9
3	(Nova Scotia) Saint Mary's Huskies	2

Final
1	Alberta Golden Bears	6
2	(Ontario) Wilfrid Laurier Golden Hawks	4
Bronze-medal game
3	(Nova Scotia) Saint Mary's Huskies	4
4	(Manitoba) Winnipeg Wesmen	6

==== Semifinals ====
Saturday, March 21, 9:30

Team	1	2	3	4	5	6	7	8	9	10	Final
Alberta Golden Bears (Scoffin)	2	1	1	1	0	0	2	X	X	X	7
(Manitoba) Winnipeg Wesmen (Doering)	0	0	0	0	0	1	0	X	X	X	1

Team	1	2	3	4	5	6	7	8	9	10	Final
(Ontario) Wilfrid Laurier Golden Hawks (Squires)	1	0	2	5	1	0	X	X	X	X	9
(Nova Scotia) Saint Mary's Huskies (MacKenzie)	0	1	0	0	0	1	X	X	X	X	2

==== Bronze-medal game ====
Saturday, March 21, 14:30

Team	1	2	3	4	5	6	7	8	9	10	Final
(Nova Scotia) Saint Mary's Huskies (MacKenzie)	0	1	0	0	0	2	0	0	1	X	4
(Manitoba) Winnipeg Wesmen (Doering)	0	0	0	2	2	0	0	2	0	X	6

==== Final ====
Saturday, March 21, 14:30

Team	1	2	3	4	5	6	7	8	9	10	Final
Alberta Golden Bears (Scoffin)	0	1	0	0	0	2	0	2	0	1	6
(Ontario) Wilfrid Laurier Golden Hawks (Squires)	0	0	1	0	0	0	1	0	2	0	4

== Women ==
=== Teams ===
The teams are listed as follows:

Team	Skip	Third	Second	Lead	Alternate(s)	Coach	University
Alberta Pandas	Kelsey Rocque	Taylor McDonald	Claire Tully	Alison Kotylak	Taylore Theroux	Amanda Coderre	University of Alberta
Brock Badgers	Erin Macaulay	Terri Weeks	Danielle Robinson	Joanna Francolini	Samantha Morris; Lauren Calvert	Murray Etherington; Ken Sandham	(Ontario) Brock University
Guelph Gryphons	Katelyn Wasylkiw	Jestyn Murphy	Emily Walsh	Heather Cridland	Jacinda Schieck	Byron Scott	(Ontario) University of Guelph
Saint Mary's Huskies	Sara Spafford	Amanda Colter	Mackenzie Proctor	Laura Kennedy		Carole MacLean	(Nova Scotia) Saint Mary's University
St. Francis Xavier X-Women	Ashley Francis	Carolyn Rose	Bailey Lonergan	Brittany Black	Sarah MacPhee	Donalda Mattie	(Nova Scotia) St. Francis Xavier University
Thompson Rivers WolfPack	Corryn Brown	Erin Pincott	Samantha Fisher	Ashley Nordin	Sydney Fraser	Brenda Nordin	(British Columbia) Thompson Rivers University
UPEI Panthers	Veronica Smith	Jane DiCarlo	Emily Gray	Aleya Quilty		Paul Smith	(Prince Edward Island) UPEI
Wilfrid Laurier Golden Hawks	Carly Howard	Kerilynn Mathers	Evangeline Fortier	Chelsea Brandwood	Riley Sandham	Jason Rice	(Ontario) Sir Wilfrid Laurier University

=== Round-robin standings ===
Final round-robin standings

Key
Teams to Playoffs

Team	Skip	W	L
(British Columbia) Thompson Rivers WolfPack	Corryn Brown	7	0
Alberta Pandas	Kelsey Rocque	6	1
(Ontario) Wilfrid Laurier Golden Hawks	Carly Howard	5	2
(Prince Edward Island) UPEI Panthers	Veronica Smith	3	4
(Ontario) Brock Badgers	Erin Macaulay	3	4
(Ontario) Guelph Gryphons	Katelyn Wasylkiw	3	4
(Nova Scotia) Saint Mary's Huskies	Sara Spafford	1	6
(Nova Scotia) St. Francis Xavier X-Women	Ashley Francis	0	7

=== Playoffs ===
Semifinal
1	(British Columbia) Thompson Rivers WolfPack	10
4	(Prince Edward Island) UPEI Panthers	1
2	Alberta Pandas	6
3	(Ontario) Wilfrid Laurier Golden Hawks	2

Final
1	(British Columbia) Thompson Rivers WolfPack	6
2	Alberta Pandas	7
Bronze-medal game
3	(Ontario) Wilfrid Laurier Golden Hawks	8
4	(Prince Edward Island) UPEI Panthers	3

==== Semifinals ====
Saturday, March 21, 9:30

Team	1	2	3	4	5	6	7	8	9	10	Final
(British Columbia) Thompson Rivers WolfPack (Brown)	2	0	2	1	1	4	X	X	X	X	10
(Prince Edward Island) UPEI Panthers (Smith)	0	1	0	0	0	0	X	X	X	X	1

Team	1	2	3	4	5	6	7	8	9	10	Final
Alberta Pandas (Rocque)	0	2	1	1	0	0	1	0	1	X	6
(Ontario) Wilfrid Laurier Golden Hawks (Howard)	0	0	0	0	1	0	0	1	0	X	2

==== Bronze-medal game ====
Saturday, March 21, 14:30

Team	1	2	3	4	5	6	7	8	9	10	Final
(Ontario) Wilfrid Laurier Golden Hawks (Howard)	1	0	0	1	0	0	2	4	0	X	8
(Prince Edward Island) UPEI Panthers (Smith)	0	0	1	0	0	1	0	0	1	X	3

==== Final ====
Saturday, March 21, 14:30

Team	1	2	3	4	5	6	7	8	9	10	Final
(British Columbia) Thompson Rivers WolfPack (Brown)	0	2	0	1	0	2	0	0	1	X	6
Alberta Pandas (Rocque)	0	0	1	0	2	0	4	0	0	X	7
