= Erin Pincott =

Canadian curler

- Curler
- Born: Erin Pincott; April 17, 1995 (age 31); Richmond, British Columbia, Canada

Team
- Curling club: McArthur Island CC, Kamloops, BC
- Skip: Selena Njegovan
- Third: Erin Pincott
- Second: Margot Flemming
- Lead: Krysten Karwacki

Curling career
- Member Association: British Columbia (2010–2026); Manitoba (2026–present)
- Hearts: 5 (2020, 2021, 2024, 2025, 2026)
- World Junior Curling Championship: 1 (2013)
- Top CTRS ranking: 6th (2024–25)
Medal record
Women's Curling
Representing British Columbia
Canada Winter Games
Gold medal – first place	2011 Halifax
Representing Manitoba
Scotties Tournament of Hearts
Silver medal – second place	2026 Mississauga

Erin Pincott (born April 17, 1995, in Richmond, British Columbia) is a Canadian curler from Kamloops. She currently plays third on Team Selena Njegovan. She was the longtime third for Corryn Brown, having played together since they were six years old.

== Career ==
=== Junior career ===
Playing for Corryn Brown, Pincott won a gold medal at the 2011 Canada Winter Games for British Columbia after winning the 2010 provincial high school championships and the 2010 BC Winter games gold medal. They represented the province at the 2013 Canadian Junior Curling Championships, which they also won. This qualified the team to represent Canada at the 2013 World Junior Curling Championships, where they finished with a 3–6 record. The team lost in the finals of the BC Juniors the following year. The team began the 2014–15 season by winning the Coronation Business Group Classic event on the World Curling Tour. Later in the year, the team won the 2015 BC Juniors. At the 2015 Canadian Junior Curling Championships, the team finished in third place. The same year, the team won a silver medal at the 2015 CIS/CCA Curling Championships for Thompson Rivers University. In Pincotts final year of juniors, the team lost in the finals of the 2016 BC juniors. The team won another silver medal for Thompson Rivers at the 2016 CIS/CCA Curling Championships.

=== Women's career ===
After juniors, Pincott joined the Karla Thompson rink for the 2016–17 season instead of playing another year in juniors. The Thompson rink won the January 2017 King Cash Spiel Tour event and went 2–5 at the 2017 British Columbia Scotties Tournament of Hearts, Pincott's first provincial championship.

The Corryn Brown rink was re-united in 2017. The team played in the 2018 British Columbia Scotties Tournament of Hearts, where they coincidentally lost to Karla Thompson in the semifinal. The team represented Thompson Rivers once again at the 2018 National University championships, winning a third silver medal.

The next season, the Brown rink won two tour events, the King Cash Spiel and the Sunset Ranch Kelowna Double Cash. At the 2019 British Columbia Scotties Tournament of Hearts, the team made it to the finals where they lost to Sarah Wark.

In the 2019–20 season, the Brown rink won two more tour events, the Driving Force Decks Int'l Abbotsford Cashspiel and the Kamloops Crown of Curling. Later in the season, the team won the 2020 British Columbia Scotties Tournament of Hearts and went on to represent British Columbia at the 2020 Scotties Tournament of Hearts, Canada's national women's championships, Pincott's first. There, BC finished with a 5–6 record and they finished in sixth place. After the season, Ashley Klymchuk left the team due to her pregnancy and was replaced by Samantha Fisher who previously played on the team before deciding to focus on her studies. Pincott and Dezaray Hawes continued at third and second respectively.

Team Brown began the 2020–21 curling season by winning the 2020 Sunset Ranch Kelowna Double Cash. Due to the COVID-19 pandemic in British Columbia, the 2021 provincial championship was cancelled. As the reigning provincial champions, Team Brown was invited to represent British Columbia at the 2021 Scotties Tournament of Hearts, which they accepted. At the Hearts, they finished a 4–4 round robin record, failing to qualify for the championship round.

To begin the 2021–22 season, the Brown rink won the Alberta Curling Series: Leduc event. They then played in the 2021 Alberta Curling Series: Saville Shoot-Out where they went undefeated until the semifinals where they were defeated by Laura Walker. Due to the pandemic, the qualification process for the 2021 Canadian Olympic Curling Trials had to be modified to qualify enough teams for the championship. In these modifications, Curling Canada created the 2021 Canadian Curling Trials Direct-Entry Event, an event where five teams would compete to try to earn one of three spots into the 2021 Canadian Olympic Curling Trials. Team Brown qualified for the Trials Direct-Entry Event due to their CTRS ranking from the 2019–20 season. At the event, the team went 1–3 through the round robin, qualifying for the tiebreaker round where they faced Alberta's Walker rink. After winning the first game, Team Brown lost the second and final tiebreaker, not earning direct qualification into the Trials. The team had one final chance to advance to the Olympic Trials through the 2021 Canadian Olympic Curling Pre-Trials where they finished the round-robin with a 4–2 record. This qualified them for the double knockout round, where they beat both Mackenzie Zacharias and Sherry Anderson to advance to the final qualifier. There, they lost 9–2 to Jacqueline Harrison, ending their chances of reaching the Olympic Trials. Back on tour, the team played in their first Grand Slam of Curling event, the 2021 National, which they qualified for due to their successful results throughout the season. They finished 2–3 through the triple knockout event, just missing the playoffs. At the 2022 British Columbia Scotties Tournament of Hearts, Team Brown entered as the number one seeds, however, lost two qualifying games against Kayla MacMillan and Diane Gushulak, qualifying through the C side. They then lost the 3 vs. 4 game to Sarah Wark, eliminating them from provincials. They finished their season at the inaugural Best of the West championship where they won the title.

Team Brown struggled at the beginning of the 2022–23 season, failing to qualify for the playoffs in their first three events. They turned thing around at the Prestige Hotels & Resorts Curling Classic, losing just one game en route to capturing the event title. Later that month, they won their second title at the Kamloops Crown of Curling. Despite only entering the playoffs in two of their eight tour events, Team Brown found immediate success at the 2023 British Columbia Scotties Tournament of Hearts, defeating the number one ranked Clancy Grandy rink in both the A qualifier and the 1 vs. 2 page playoff. In the final, again facing Grandy, they fell 10–9 in an extra end, failing to qualify for the 2023 Scotties Tournament of Hearts which was held in their home city of Kamloops. At the end of the season, the team again won the Best of the West championship, defeating Manitoba's Kelsey Rocque 6–1 in the final. In March 2023, the team announced they would be parting ways with second Dezaray Hawes. They later announced Jennifer Armstrong would join them as their new second for the 2023–24 season.

== Personal life ==
Pincott works as a learning strategist in athletics at Thompson Rivers University. She is in a relationship with fellow curler Matt Dunstone. In addition to attending Thompson Rivers University, Pincott attended South Kamloops Secondary School. Pincott's grandfather Grant Young represented British Columbia twice at the Brier.
