= 2019 Curlers Corner Autumn Gold Curling Classic =

- Host city: Calgary, Alberta
- Arena: Calgary Curling Club
- Dates: October 11–14
- Winner: (Manitoba) Kerri Einarson
- Curling club: Gimli CC, Gimli
- Skip: Kerri Einarson
- Third: Val Sweeting
- Second: Shannon Birchard
- Lead: Briane Meilleur
- Finalist: (Alberta) Team Scheidegger

The 2019 Curlers Corner Autumn Gold Curling Classic was held from October 11 to 14 at the Calgary Curling Club in Calgary, Alberta as part of the World Curling Tour. The event was held in a triple-knockout format with a purse of $44,000.

In the final, Kerri Einarson of Gimli defeated Cheryl Bernard who was skipping Team Scheidegger 7–0 to claim the title.

== Teams ==
The teams are listed as follows:

Skip	Third	Second	Lead	Locale
Sherry Anderson	Nancy Martin	Meaghan Frerichs	Chaelynn Kitz	Saskatoon, Saskatchewan
Ryleigh Bakker	Ashton Skrlik	Lisa Parent	Julianna Mackenzie	Calgary, Alberta
Teryn Berlando	Geri-Lynn Ramsay	Shana Snell	Krista Shortridge	Calgary, Alberta
Chelsea Carey	Sarah Wilkes	Dana Ferguson	Rachelle Brown	Calgary, Alberta
Kerri Einarson	Val Sweeting	Shannon Birchard	Briane Meilleur	Gimli, Manitoba
Tracy Fleury	Selena Njegovan	Jill Officer	Kristin MacCuish	East St. Paul, Manitoba
Satsuki Fujisawa	Chinami Yoshida	Yumi Suzuki	Yurika Yoshida	Kitami, Japan
Gim Un-chi	Um Min-ji	Kim Su-ji	Seol Ye-eun	Uijeongbu, Gyeonggi-do, South Korea
Amber Holland	Cindy Ricci	Laura Strong	Debbie Lozinski	Regina, Saskatchewan
Lindsay Hudyma	Heather Hansen	Jenna Duncan	Patty Wallingham	Vancouver, British Columbia
Daniela Jentsch	Emira Abbes	Klara-Hermine Fomm	Analena Jentsch	Füssen, Germany
Jennifer Jones	Kaitlyn Lawes	Jocelyn Peterman	Dawn McEwen	Winnipeg, Manitoba
Kim Kyeong-ae (Fourth)	Kim Cho-hi	Kim Eun-jung (Skip)	Kim Seon-yeong	Uiseong, South Korea
Kim Min-ji	Ha Seung-youn	Kim Hye-rin	Yang Tae-i	Chuncheon, South Korea
Alina Kovaleva	Maria Komarova	Galina Arsenkina	Ekaterina Kuzmina	Saint Petersburg, Russia
Diana Margarian	Irina Nizovtseva	Arina Piantina	Nadezhda Beliakova	Saint Petersburg, Russia
Eve Muirhead	Lauren Gray	Jennifer Dodds	Vicky Wright	Stirling, Scotland
Ikue Kitazawa (Fourth)	Chiaki Matsumura	Seina Nakajima (Skip)	Hasumi Ishigooka	Nagano, Japan
Kelsey Rocque	Danielle Schmiemann	Becca Hebert	Jesse Marlow	Edmonton, Alberta
Tabitha Peterson	Aileen Geving	Nina Roth	Becca Hamilton	McFarland, United States
Cheryl Bernard	Cary-Anne McTaggart	Jessie Haughian	Kristie Moore	Lethbridge, Alberta
Robyn Silvernagle	Jessie Hunkin	Breanne Knapp	Kara Thevenot	North Battleford, Saskatchewan
Jamie Sinclair	Cory Christensen	Vicky Persinger	Sarah Anderson	Chaska, United States
Kayla Skrlik	Lindsay Makichuk	Brittany Tran	Hope Sunley	Calgary, Alberta
Kellie Stiksma	Rhonda Varnes	Ocean Pletz	Bailey Horte	Edmonton, Alberta
Kristen Streifel	Kelly Schafer	Dayna Demers	Kalynn Park	Swift Current, Saskatchewan
Kaitlin Stubbs	Cassie Savage	Lesley Pyne	Megan Johnson	Calgary, Alberta
Selena Sturmay	Chantele Broderson	Kate Goodhelpsen	Lauren Marks	Edmonton, Alberta
Jodi Vaughan	Jody McNabb	Nicole Larson	Valerie Ekelund	Calgary, Alberta
Laura Walker	Kate Cameron	Taylor McDonald	Nadine Scotland	Edmonton, Alberta
Wang Meini	Ding Yuexin	Liu Tong	Li Yingtong	Changchun, China
Jessica Wytrychowski	Olivia Jones	Micayla Kooistra	Emily Kiist	Calgary, Alberta

== Knockout brackets ==
=== A event ===
First Knockout
(Manitoba) Kerri Einarson	9
(Alberta) Jessica Wytrychowski	0
(South Korea) Gim Un-chi	3
(Alberta) Laura Walker	6
(Scotland) Eve Muirhead	8
(Alberta) Kayla Skrlik	7
(Alberta) Kelsey Rocque	2
(Alberta) Selena Sturmay	4
(Alberta) Chelsea Carey	6
(Alberta) Ryleigh Bakker	3
(United States) Team Roth	9
(Saskatchewan) Sherry Anderson	3
(Manitoba) Tracy Fleury	6
(Alberta) Kellie Stiksma	4
(South Korea) Kim Min-ji	5
(Saskatchewan) Kristen Streifel	4

Quarterfinals
(Manitoba) Kerri Einarson	5
(Alberta) Laura Walker	3
(Scotland) Eve Muirhead	4
(Alberta) Selena Sturmay	0
(Alberta) Chelsea Carey	4
(United States) Team Roth	6
(Manitoba) Tracy Fleury	9
(South Korea) Kim Min-ji	7

Semifinals
(Manitoba) Kerri Einarson	8
(Scotland) Eve Muirhead	3
(United States) Team Roth	4
(Manitoba) Tracy Fleury	5

Qualifier 1
(Manitoba) Kerri Einarson	7
(Manitoba) Tracy Fleury	5

First Knockout
(Manitoba) Jennifer Jones	8
(Russia) Diana Margarian	4
(Russia) Alina Kovaleva	10
(Saskatchewan) Amber Holland	2
(Saskatchewan) Robyn Silvernagle	6
(Alberta) Kaitlin Stubbs	7
(Japan) Seina Nakajima	9
(British Columbia) Lindsay Hudyma	5
(Japan) Satsuki Fujisawa	6
(Alberta) Teryn Berlando	5
(South Korea) Kim Eun-jung	6
(United States) Jamie Sinclair	5
(Alberta) Team Scheidegger	8
(China) Wang Meini	2
(Germany) Daniela Jentsch	6
(Alberta) Jodi Vaughan	5

Quarterfinals
(Manitoba) Jennifer Jones	8
(Russia) Alina Kovaleva	2
(Alberta) Kaitlin Stubbs	2
(Japan) Seina Nakajima	6
(Japan) Satsuki Fujisawa	6
(South Korea) Kim Eun-jung	4
(Alberta) Team Scheidegger	6
(Germany) Daniela Jentsch	1

Semifinals
(Manitoba) Jennifer Jones	6
(Japan) Seina Nakajima	5
(Japan) Satsuki Fujisawa	3
(Alberta) Team Scheidegger	4

Qualifier 2
(Manitoba) Jennifer Jones	3
(Alberta) Team Scheidegger	8

=== B event ===
Second Knockout
(Alberta) Jessica Wytrychowski	7
(South Korea) Gim Un-chi	5
(Alberta) Kayla Skrlik	5
(Alberta) Kelsey Rocque	4

Quarterfinals
(Germany) Daniela Jentsch	6
(Alberta) Jessica Wytrychowski	4
(South Korea) Kim Eun-jung	5
(Alberta) Kayla Skrlik	6

Semifinals
(Germany) Daniela Jentsch	3
(Japan) Seina Nakajima	8
(Alberta) Kayla Skrlik	4
(United States) Team Roth	3

To Qualifier 3
(Japan) Seina Nakajima	4
(Alberta) Kayla Skrlik	9
Qualifier 3
(Alberta) Kayla Skrlik	5
(Manitoba) Tracy Fleury	6

Second Knockout
(Alberta) Ryleigh Bakker	6
(Saskatchewan) Sherry Anderson	7
(Alberta) Kellie Stiksma	0
(Saskatchewan) Kristen Streifel	6

Quarterfinals
(Alberta) Kaitlin Stubbs	4
(Saskatchewan) Sherry Anderson	5
(Russia) Alina Kovaleva	6
(Saskatchewan) Kristen Streifel	4

Semifinals
(Saskatchewan) Sherry Anderson	4
(Russia) Alina Kovaleva	6

To Qualifier 3
(Russia) Alina Kovaleva	4
(Manitoba) Tracy Fleury	5

Second Knockout
(Russia) Diana Margarian	1
(Saskatchewan) Amber Holland	8
(Saskatchewan) Robyn Silvernagle	8
(British Columbia) Lindsay Hudyma	2

Quarterfinals
(South Korea) Kim Min-ji	2
(Saskatchewan) Amber Holland	11
(Alberta) Chelsea Carey	6
(Saskatchewan) Robyn Silvernagle	5

Semifinals
(Saskatchewan) Amber Holland	4
(Japan) Satsuki Fujisawa	6
(Alberta) Chelsea Carey	6
(Scotland) Eve Muirhead	7

To Qualifier 4
(Japan) Satsuki Fujisawa	8
(Scotland) Eve Muirhead	2
Qualifier 4
(Japan) Satsuki Fujisawa	6
(Manitoba) Jennifer Jones	3

Second Knockout
(Alberta) Teryn Berlando	4
(United States) Jamie Sinclair	7
(China) Wang Meini	6
(Alberta) Jodi Vaughan	1

Quarterfinals
(Alberta) Selena Sturmay	5
(United States) Jamie Sinclair	1
(Alberta) Laura Walker	7
(China) Wang Meini	2

Semifinals
(Alberta) Selena Sturmay	7
(Alberta) Laura Walker	6

To Qualifier 4
(Alberta) Selena Sturmay	5
(Manitoba) Jennifer Jones	6

=== C event ===
Third Knockout
(South Korea) Gim Un-chi	4
(Alberta) Kelsey Rocque	8
(Alberta) Ryleigh Bakker	6
(Alberta) Kellie Stiksma	5

Quarterfinals
(Saskatchewan) Amber Holland	7
(Alberta) Kelsey Rocque	3
(Alberta) Chelsea Carey	7
(Alberta) Ryleigh Bakker	2

Semifinals
(Saskatchewan) Amber Holland	6
(Alberta) Chelsea Carey	7

Qualifier 5
(Alberta) Chelsea Carey	6
(Alberta) Kayla Skrlik	5

Third Knockout
(Alberta) Kaitlin Stubbs	5
(Saskatchewan) Kristen Streifel	7

Quarterfinals
(Alberta) Jessica Wytrychowski	3
(South Korea) Kim Eun-jung	7
(Alberta) Laura Walker	4
(Saskatchewan) Kristen Streifel	5

Semifinals
(South Korea) Kim Eun-jung	6
(Alberta) Selena Sturmay	2
(Saskatchewan) Kristen Streifel	3
(Scotland) Eve Muirhead	9

Qualifier 6
(South Korea) Kim Eun-jung	7
(Scotland) Eve Muirhead	5

Third Knockout
(United States) Jamie Sinclair	11
(China) Wang Meini	1

Quarterfinals
(Saskatchewan) Sherry Anderson	2
(United States) Jamie Sinclair	7
(South Korea) Kim Min-ji	5
(Saskatchewan) Robyn Silvernagle	7

Semifinals
(United States) Jamie Sinclair	4
(Japan) Seina Nakajima	6
(Saskatchewan) Robyn Silvernagle	8
(Russia) Alina Kovaleva	2

Qualifier 7
(Japan) Seina Nakajima	5
(Saskatchewan) Robyn Silvernagle	4

Third Knockout
(Russia) Diana Margarian	6
(British Columbia) Lindsay Hudyma	7
(Alberta) Teryn Berlando	2
(Alberta) Jodi Vaughan	10

Quarterfinals
(Germany) Daniela Jentsch	6
(British Columbia) Lindsay Hudyma	2
(United States) Team Roth	6
(Alberta) Jodi Vaughan	5

Semifinals
(Germany) Daniela Jentsch	6
(United States) Team Roth	4

Qualifier 8
(Germany) Daniela Jentsch	5
(Manitoba) Jennifer Jones	7

== Knockout results ==
All draw times listed in Mountain Daylight Time.

=== Draw 1 ===
Friday, October 11, 9:30 am

Sheet 1	1	2	3	4	5	6	7	8	Final
(Alberta) Kelsey Rocque 🔨	1	0	0	1	0	0	0	0	2
(Alberta) Selena Sturmay	0	1	0	0	2	1	0	0	4

Sheet 2	1	2	3	4	5	6	7	8	Final
(Scotland) Eve Muirhead	1	0	3	0	1	2	0	1	8
(Alberta) Kayla Skrlik 🔨	0	4	0	2	0	0	1	0	7

Sheet 3	1	2	3	4	5	6	7	8	Final
(South Korea) Gim Un-chi	0	1	0	2	0	0	0	0	3
(Alberta) Laura Walker 🔨	1	0	2	0	0	1	1	1	6

Sheet 4	1	2	3	4	5	6	7	8	Final
(Manitoba) Kerri Einarson 🔨	2	2	1	1	3	X	X	X	9
(Alberta) Jessica Wytrychowski	0	0	0	0	0	X	X	X	0

Sheet 5	1	2	3	4	5	6	7	8	Final
(South Korea) Kim Min-ji 🔨	0	1	1	1	0	0	0	2	5
(Saskatchewan) Kristen Streifel	0	0	0	0	1	2	1	0	4

Sheet 6	1	2	3	4	5	6	7	8	Final
(Manitoba) Tracy Fleury 🔨	0	3	0	0	0	2	0	1	6
(Alberta) Kellie Stiksma	0	0	2	0	1	0	1	0	4

Sheet 7	1	2	3	4	5	6	7	8	Final
(United States) Team Roth	0	1	2	0	5	0	1	X	9
(Saskatchewan) Sherry Anderson 🔨	0	0	0	1	0	2	0	X	3

Sheet 8	1	2	3	4	5	6	7	8	Final
(Alberta) Chelsea Carey	0	2	0	0	2	0	0	2	6
(Alberta) Ryleigh Bakker 🔨	0	0	0	1	0	1	1	0	3

=== Draw 2 ===
Friday, October 11, 1:15 pm

Sheet 1	1	2	3	4	5	6	7	8	Final
(Japan) Satsuki Fujisawa	2	1	0	1	0	1	0	1	6
(Alberta) Teryn Berlando 🔨	0	0	2	0	2	0	1	0	5

Sheet 2	1	2	3	4	5	6	7	8	Final
(South Korea) Kim Eun-jung 🔨	1	0	1	0	0	2	0	2	6
(United States) Jamie Sinclair	0	1	0	1	2	0	1	0	5

Sheet 3	1	2	3	4	5	6	7	8	Final
(Alberta) Team Scheidegger 🔨	1	0	0	2	0	1	4	X	8
(China) Wang Meini	0	1	0	0	1	0	0	X	2

Sheet 4	1	2	3	4	5	6	7	8	Final
(Germany) Daniela Jentsch 🔨	1	0	2	0	1	1	1	0	6
(Alberta) Jodi Vaughan	0	2	0	2	0	0	0	1	5

Sheet 5	1	2	3	4	5	6	7	8	Final
(Manitoba) Jennifer Jones 🔨	2	0	2	0	0	1	2	1	8
(Russia) Diana Margarian	0	1	0	3	0	0	0	0	4

Sheet 6	1	2	3	4	5	6	7	8	Final
(Russia) Alina Kovaleva	3	0	1	2	4	X	X	X	10
(Saskatchewan) Amber Holland 🔨	0	2	0	0	0	X	X	X	2

Sheet 7	1	2	3	4	5	6	7	8	9	Final
(Saskatchewan) Robyn Silvernagle 🔨	0	2	1	0	1	0	2	0	0	6
(Alberta) Kaitlin Stubbs	1	0	0	2	0	2	0	1	1	7

Sheet 8	1	2	3	4	5	6	7	8	Final
(Japan) Seina Nakajima	0	0	1	4	4	0	0	X	9
(British Columbia) Lindsay Hudyma 🔨	0	1	0	0	0	3	1	X	5

=== Draw 3 ===
Friday, October 11, 5:15 pm

Sheet 1	1	2	3	4	5	6	7	8	Final
(Manitoba) Tracy Fleury 🔨	1	0	1	0	2	0	5	X	9
(South Korea) Kim Min-ji	0	2	0	2	0	3	0	X	7

Sheet 2	1	2	3	4	5	6	7	8	Final
(Alberta) Chelsea Carey	1	0	0	1	0	0	2	0	4
(United States) Team Roth 🔨	0	2	0	0	0	2	0	2	6

Sheet 3	1	2	3	4	5	6	7	8	Final
(Alberta) Kellie Stiksma 🔨	0	0	0	X	X	X	X	X	0
(Saskatchewan) Kristen Streifel	1	1	4	X	X	X	X	X	6

Sheet 4	1	2	3	4	5	6	7	8	Final
(Alberta) Ryleigh Bakker	0	2	0	1	0	0	2	1	6
(Saskatchewan) Sherry Anderson 🔨	2	0	2	0	1	2	0	0	7

Sheet 5	1	2	3	4	5	6	7	8	Final
(Alberta) Kayla Skrlik	0	0	2	0	1	0	2	0	5
(Alberta) Kelsey Rocque 🔨	0	1	0	1	0	1	0	1	4

Sheet 6	1	2	3	4	5	6	7	8	Final
(Alberta) Jessica Wytrychowski	0	0	2	0	1	3	0	1	7
(South Korea) Gim Un-chi 🔨	0	3	0	1	0	0	1	0	5

Sheet 7	1	2	3	4	5	6	7	8	Final
(Scotland) Eve Muirhead 🔨	0	3	1	X	X	X	X	X	4
(Alberta) Selena Sturmay	0	0	0	X	X	X	X	X	0

Sheet 8	1	2	3	4	5	6	7	8	Final
(Manitoba) Kerri Einarson	1	1	1	0	0	1	0	1	5
(Alberta) Laura Walker 🔨	0	0	0	1	0	0	2	0	3

=== Draw 4 ===
Friday, October 11, 9:00 pm

Sheet 1	1	2	3	4	5	6	7	8	Final
(Manitoba) Jennifer Jones	0	0	2	1	2	0	3	X	8
(Russia) Alina Kovaleva 🔨	1	0	0	0	0	1	0	X	2

Sheet 2	1	2	3	4	5	6	7	8	Final
(Alberta) Kaitlin Stubbs	0	0	1	0	1	X	X	X	2
(Japan) Seina Nakajima 🔨	0	3	0	3	0	X	X	X	6

Sheet 3	1	2	3	4	5	6	7	8	Final
(Russia) Diana Margarian	0	1	0	0	0	X	X	X	1
(Saskatchewan) Amber Holland 🔨	2	0	2	2	2	X	X	X	8

Sheet 4	1	2	3	4	5	6	7	8	Final
(Saskatchewan) Robyn Silvernagle	2	0	3	1	0	1	1	X	8
(British Columbia) Lindsay Hudyma 🔨	0	1	0	0	1	0	0	X	2

Sheet 5	1	2	3	4	5	6	7	8	Final
(Alberta) Teryn Berlando	0	0	2	0	2	0	0	0	4
(United States) Jamie Sinclair 🔨	0	2	0	2	0	1	1	1	7

Sheet 6	1	2	3	4	5	6	7	8	Final
(China) Wang Meini	0	1	0	1	3	1	X	X	6
(Alberta) Jodi Vaughan 🔨	0	0	1	0	0	0	X	X	1

Sheet 7	1	2	3	4	5	6	7	8	Final
(Japan) Satsuki Fujisawa	1	0	1	0	2	0	0	2	6
(South Korea) Kim Eun-jung 🔨	0	1	0	1	0	1	1	0	4

Sheet 8	1	2	3	4	5	6	7	8	Final
(Alberta) Team Scheidegger 🔨	1	0	2	3	X	X	X	X	6
(Germany) Daniela Jentsch	0	1	0	0	X	X	X	X	1

=== Draw 5 ===
Saturday, October 12, 9:00 am

Sheet 2	1	2	3	4	5	6	7	8	9	Final
(Germany) Daniela Jentsch 🔨	2	0	0	1	0	0	1	0	2	6
(Alberta) Jessica Wytrychowski	0	0	1	0	1	1	0	1	0	4

Sheet 3	1	2	3	4	5	6	7	8	Final
(United States) Team Roth	1	0	1	0	1	1	0	0	4
(Manitoba) Tracy Fleury 🔨	0	1	0	2	0	0	1	1	5

Sheet 4	1	2	3	4	5	6	7	8	Final
(Alberta) Kaitlin Stubbs 🔨	0	0	1	0	1	1	1	0	4
(Saskatchewan) Sherry Anderson	1	1	0	2	0	0	0	1	5

Sheet 5	1	2	3	4	5	6	7	8	Final
(Manitoba) Kerri Einarson 🔨	5	0	1	0	1	1	X	X	8
(Scotland) Eve Muirhead	0	1	0	2	0	0	X	X	3

Sheet 6	1	2	3	4	5	6	7	8	Final
(South Korea) Kim Eun-jung 🔨	0	2	0	1	1	0	1	0	5
(Alberta) Kayla Skrlik	0	0	2	0	0	3	0	1	6

Sheet 7	1	2	3	4	5	6	7	8	Final
(Russia) Alina Kovaleva	2	0	0	1	0	3	0	X	6
(Saskatchewan) Kristen Streifel 🔨	0	0	1	0	1	0	2	X	4

=== Draw 6 ===
Saturday, October 12, 12:45 pm

Sheet 2	1	2	3	4	5	6	7	8	Final
(South Korea) Kim Min-ji	0	2	0	0	X	X	X	X	2
(Saskatchewan) Amber Holland 🔨	3	0	5	3	X	X	X	X	11

Sheet 3	1	2	3	4	5	6	7	8	Final
(Alberta) Chelsea Carey 🔨	0	2	0	2	1	0	0	1	6
(Saskatchewan) Robyn Silvernagle	0	0	3	0	0	1	1	0	5

Sheet 4	1	2	3	4	5	6	7	8	Final
(Manitoba) Jennifer Jones	1	0	1	2	0	1	0	1	6
(Japan) Seina Nakajima 🔨	0	2	0	0	2	0	1	0	5

Sheet 6	1	2	3	4	5	6	7	8	Final
(Japan) Satsuki Fujisawa	0	0	1	0	0	0	2	0	3
(Alberta) Team Scheidegger 🔨	0	1	0	1	1	0	0	1	4

Sheet 7	1	2	3	4	5	6	7	8	Final
(Alberta) Laura Walker 🔨	0	1	1	0	1	0	4	X	7
(China) Wang Meini	0	0	0	1	0	1	0	X	2

Sheet 8	1	2	3	4	5	6	7	8	Final
(Alberta) Selena Sturmay 🔨	0	1	0	2	0	1	1	X	5
(United States) Jamie Sinclair	0	0	0	0	1	0	0	X	1

=== Draw 7 ===
Saturday, October 12, 4:30 pm

Sheet 1	1	2	3	4	5	6	7	8	9	Final
(Alberta) Kayla Skrlik 🔨	1	0	0	1	0	1	0	0	1	4
(United States) Team Roth	0	1	0	0	0	0	2	0	0	3

Sheet 2	1	2	3	4	5	6	7	8	9	Final
(Manitoba) Kerri Einarson 🔨	0	3	1	0	0	1	0	0	2	7
(Manitoba) Tracy Fleury	2	0	0	2	0	0	0	1	0	5

Sheet 3	1	2	3	4	5	6	7	8	Final
(Germany) Daniela Jentsch 🔨	2	0	0	1	0	0	0	X	3
(Japan) Seina Nakajima	0	2	1	0	2	0	3	X	8

Sheet 4	1	2	3	4	5	6	7	8	Final
(United States) Jamie Sinclair	3	1	0	2	1	4	X	X	11
(China) Wang Meini	0	0	1	0	0	0	X	X	1

Sheet 5	1	2	3	4	5	6	7	8	Final
(Saskatchewan) Sherry Anderson	1	0	0	2	0	1	0	X	4
(Russia) Alina Kovaleva	0	1	1	0	2	0	2	X	6

Sheet 6	1	2	3	4	5	6	7	8	Final
(Alberta) Kaitlin Stubbs	1	0	0	2	0	1	1	0	5
(Saskatchewan) Kristen Streifel	0	4	1	0	1	0	0	1	7

Sheet 7	1	2	3	4	5	6	7	8	Final
(Alberta) Teryn Berlando	0	1	0	0	1	0	X	X	2
(Alberta) Jodi Vaughan	0	0	2	2	0	6	X	X	10

=== Draw 8 ===
Saturday, October 12, 8:15 pm

Sheet 1	1	2	3	4	5	6	7	8	Final
(Alberta) Chelsea Carey	2	2	1	0	0	0	1	0	6
(Scotland) Eve Muirhead 🔨	0	0	0	3	2	1	0	1	7

Sheet 2	1	2	3	4	5	6	7	8	9	Final
(Alberta) Ryleigh Bakker	0	0	0	2	1	0	2	0	1	6
(Alberta) Kellie Stiksma	0	2	0	0	0	2	0	1	0	5

Sheet 4	1	2	3	4	5	6	7	8	Final
(South Korea) Gim Un-chi	2	0	1	0	1	0	0	0	4
(Alberta) Kelsey Rocque 🔨	0	2	0	1	0	2	0	3	8

Sheet 5	1	2	3	4	5	6	7	8	Final
(Alberta) Selena Sturmay 🔨	0	3	0	0	3	0	0	1	7
(Alberta) Laura Walker	1	0	1	0	0	2	2	0	6

Sheet 6	1	2	3	4	5	6	7	8	Final
(Russia) Diana Margarian	0	1	0	2	0	0	3	0	6
(British Columbia) Lindsay Hudyma 🔨	0	0	2	0	3	1	0	1	7

Sheet 7	1	2	3	4	5	6	7	8	Final
(Manitoba) Jennifer Jones 🔨	0	2	0	1	X	X	X	X	3
(Alberta) Team Scheidegger	3	0	5	0	X	X	X	X	8

Sheet 8	1	2	3	4	5	6	7	8	Final
(Saskatchewan) Amber Holland 🔨	2	0	1	0	0	0	1	0	4
(Japan) Satsuki Fujisawa	0	1	0	1	1	2	0	1	6

=== Draw 9 ===
Sunday, October 13, 9:00 am

Sheet 1	1	2	3	4	5	6	7	8	Final
(Alberta) Jessica Wytrychowski	0	1	0	1	0	1	0	0	3
(South Korea) Kim Eun-jung 🔨	2	0	1	0	2	0	1	1	7

Sheet 2	1	2	3	4	5	6	7	8	Final
(United States) Team Roth 🔨	0	0	3	1	1	1	0	X	6
(Alberta) Jodi Vaughan	1	1	0	0	0	0	3	X	5

Sheet 3	1	2	3	4	5	6	7	8	Final
(Saskatchewan) Sherry Anderson	0	0	0	0	0	2	0	X	2
(United States) Jamie Sinclair 🔨	0	2	0	1	1	0	3	X	7

Sheet 4	1	2	3	4	5	6	7	8	Final
(Alberta) Laura Walker	0	1	0	0	1	0	1	1	4
(Saskatchewan) Kristen Streifel 🔨	2	0	1	1	0	1	0	0	5

Sheet 6	1	2	3	4	5	6	7	8	Final
(Russia) Alina Kovaleva 🔨	0	0	0	1	0	0	2	1	4
(Manitoba) Tracy Fleury	1	1	1	0	1	1	0	0	5

Sheet 7	1	2	3	4	5	6	7	8	Final
(Japan) Seina Nakajima	0	0	1	1	0	2	0	X	4
(Alberta) Kayla Skrlik 🔨	2	1	0	0	3	0	3	X	9

Sheet 8	1	2	3	4	5	6	7	8	Final
(South Korea) Kim Min-ji 🔨	2	0	0	1	0	2	0	0	5
(Saskatchewan) Robyn Silvernagle	0	3	2	0	1	0	0	1	7

=== Draw 10 ===
Sunday, October 13, 12:45 pm

Sheet 1	1	2	3	4	5	6	7	8	Final
(Alberta) Selena Sturmay 🔨	0	2	0	1	0	0	2	0	5
(Manitoba) Jennifer Jones	1	0	2	0	0	2	0	1	6

Sheet 3	1	2	3	4	5	6	7	8	Final
(Saskatchewan) Amber Holland 🔨	2	0	2	0	1	0	2	X	7
(Alberta) Kelsey Rocque	0	1	0	1	0	1	0	X	3

Sheet 4	1	2	3	4	5	6	7	8	Final
(Alberta) Kayla Skrlik 🔨	0	1	2	0	1	0	1	0	5
(Manitoba) Tracy Fleury	1	0	0	1	0	3	0	1	6

Sheet 5	1	2	3	4	5	6	7	8	Final
(Germany) Daniela Jentsch	0	0	0	2	0	3	1	X	6
(British Columbia) Lindsay Hudyma 🔨	0	0	1	0	1	0	0	X	2

Sheet 6	1	2	3	4	5	6	7	8	Final
(Alberta) Chelsea Carey 🔨	0	0	3	2	1	1	X	X	7
(Alberta) Ryleigh Bakker	1	1	0	0	0	0	X	X	2

Sheet 7	1	2	3	4	5	6	7	8	Final
(Japan) Satsuki Fujisawa 🔨	0	2	0	3	1	2	X	X	8
(Scotland) Eve Muirhead	1	0	1	0	0	0	X	X	2

=== Draw 11 ===
Sunday, October 13, 4:30 pm

Sheet 2	1	2	3	4	5	6	7	8	Final
(South Korea) Kim Eun-jung	0	0	1	0	0	2	1	2	6
(Alberta) Selena Sturmay 🔨	0	1	0	1	0	0	0	0	2

Sheet 3	1	2	3	4	5	6	7	8	Final
(Saskatchewan) Kristen Streifel 🔨	0	1	0	1	0	1	0	X	3
(Scotland) Eve Muirhead	0	0	3	0	3	0	3	X	9

Sheet 4	1	2	3	4	5	6	7	8	Final
(Japan) Satsuki Fujisawa 🔨	1	0	1	1	0	1	2	X	6
(Manitoba) Jennifer Jones	0	1	0	0	2	0	0	X	3

Sheet 5	1	2	3	4	5	6	7	8	9	Final
(Saskatchewan) Amber Holland	1	0	0	3	0	0	0	2	0	6
(Alberta) Chelsea Carey 🔨	0	2	1	0	2	0	1	0	1	7

Sheet 6	1	2	3	4	5	6	7	8	Final
(United States) Jamie Sinclair	0	0	0	1	0	0	3	0	4
(Japan) Seina Nakajima 🔨	0	1	0	0	3	1	0	1	6

Sheet 7	1	2	3	4	5	6	7	8	Final
(Saskatchewan) Robyn Silvernagle 🔨	0	2	0	1	0	4	1	X	8
(Russia) Alina Kovaleva	1	0	0	0	1	0	0	X	2

Sheet 8	1	2	3	4	5	6	7	8	Final
(Germany) Daniela Jentsch 🔨	3	1	0	2	0	X	X	X	6
(United States) Team Roth	0	0	2	0	2	X	X	X	4

=== Draw 12 ===
Sunday, October 13, 8:15 pm

Sheet 2	1	2	3	4	5	6	7	8	Final
(Alberta) Chelsea Carey	0	3	1	0	1	0	0	1	6
(Alberta) Kayla Skrlik 🔨	1	0	0	2	0	1	1	0	5

Sheet 3	1	2	3	4	5	6	7	8	Final
(Germany) Daniela Jentsch	0	0	3	1	0	0	1	0	5
(Manitoba) Jennifer Jones 🔨	1	1	0	0	2	2	0	1	7

Sheet 5	1	2	3	4	5	6	7	8	Final
(Japan) Seina Nakajima	1	0	0	2	0	1	0	1	5
(Saskatchewan) Robyn Silvernagle 🔨	0	1	1	0	1	0	1	0	4

Sheet 6	1	2	3	4	5	6	7	8	Final
(South Korea) Kim Eun-jung 🔨	0	2	4	0	1	0	0	X	7
(Scotland) Eve Muirhead	1	0	0	2	0	1	1	X	5

== Playoffs ==
Quarterfinals
A1	(Manitoba) Kerri Einarson	5
C2	(South Korea) Kim Eun-jung	4
C1	(Alberta) Chelsea Carey	1
B2	(Japan) Satsuki Fujisawa	7
B1	(Manitoba) Tracy Fleury	6
C4	(Manitoba) Jennifer Jones	3
C3	(Japan) Seina Nakajima	5
A2	(Alberta) Team Scheidegger	6

Semifinals
A1	(Manitoba) Kerri Einarson	7
B2	(Japan) Satsuki Fujisawa	5
B1	(Manitoba) Tracy Fleury	5
A2	(Alberta) Team Scheidegger	8

Final
A1	(Manitoba) Kerri Einarson	7
A2	(Alberta) Team Scheidegger	0

=== Quarterfinals ===
Monday, October 14, 9:00 am

Sheet 2	1	2	3	4	5	6	7	8	Final
(Manitoba) Tracy Fleury 🔨	2	2	0	1	1	0	0	X	6
(Manitoba) Jennifer Jones	0	0	1	0	0	1	1	X	3

Sheet 3	1	2	3	4	5	6	7	8	Final
(Japan) Seina Nakajima	0	0	1	0	2	0	2	0	5
(Alberta) Team Scheidegger 🔨	0	1	0	1	0	1	0	3	6

Sheet 6	1	2	3	4	5	6	7	8	Final
(Alberta) Chelsea Carey	0	0	1	0	X	X	X	X	1
(Japan) Satsuki Fujisawa 🔨	3	2	0	2	X	X	X	X	7

Sheet 7	1	2	3	4	5	6	7	8	Final
(Manitoba) Kerri Einarson 🔨	1	0	1	0	1	1	0	1	5
(South Korea) Kim Eun-jung	0	1	0	2	0	0	1	0	4

=== Semifinals ===
Monday, October 14, 12:15 pm

Sheet 3	1	2	3	4	5	6	7	8	Final
(Manitoba) Kerri Einarson 🔨	3	0	0	0	0	0	4	X	7
(Japan) Satsuki Fujisawa	0	2	0	1	1	1	0	X	5

Sheet 5	1	2	3	4	5	6	7	8	Final
(Manitoba) Tracy Fleury	0	0	4	0	1	0	0	0	5
(Alberta) Team Scheidegger 🔨	0	1	0	1	0	2	2	2	8

=== Final ===
Monday, October 14, 3:30 pm

Sheet 4	1	2	3	4	5	6	7	8	Final
(Manitoba) Kerri Einarson 🔨	1	2	3	1	X	X	X	X	7
(Alberta) Team Scheidegger	0	0	0	0	X	X	X	X	0
