= Kelowna Double Cash =

World Curling Tour event

The Kelowna Double Cash is an annual tournament on the men's and women's World Curling Tour. It is held annually in November at the Kelowna Curling Club in Kelowna, British Columbia. The men's event is sponsored by Raymond James Financial and the women's event by the Sunset Ranch Golf & Country Club.

The purse for the event is $15,200.

The event has been held since 2018.

The 2020 event was the first BC event of the 2020–21 curling season, as other events had been cancelled due to the COVID-19 pandemic in British Columbia.

== Men's champions ==
Year	Winning team	Runner up team	Purse (CAD)	Winner's share (CAD)
2018	(British Columbia) Jim Cotter, Steve Laycock, Tyrel Griffith, Rick Sawatsky	(British Columbia) Tyler Tardi, Sterling Middleton, Matthew Hall, Alex Horvath	$13,000	$4,000
2019	(British Columbia) Daniel Wenzek, Cameron de Jong, Cody Tanaka, Nicholas Umbach	(British Columbia) Jeff Richard, Tyler Klymchuk, Corey Chester, Rhys Gamache	$14,200	$4,500
2020	(British Columbia) Tyler Tardi, Sterling Middleton, Jason Ginter, Jordan Tardi	(British Columbia) Sean Geall, Jeff Richard, Jared Kolomaya, Nicholas Meister	$15,200	$4,500
2021	(Japan) Yuta Matsumura, Tetsuro Shimizu, Yasumasa Tanida, Shinya Abe	(British Columbia) Cameron de Jong, Andrew Komlodi, Matt Tolley, John Slattery	$7,000	$3,000

== Women's champions ==
Year	Winning team	Runner up team	Purse (CAD)	Winner's share (CAD)
2018	(British Columbia) Corryn Brown, Erin Pincott, Dezaray Hawes, Ashley Klymchuk	(British Columbia) Alyssa Kyllo, Kelsi Jones, Morgayne Eby, Kim Slattery (skip)	$8,800	$3,400
2019	(Japan) Tori Koana, Yuna Kotani, Mao Ishigaki, Arisa Kotani	(Alberta) Nicky Kaufman, Pam Appelman, Kim Curtin, Stephanie Enright	$12,600	$4,000
2020	(British Columbia) Corryn Brown, Erin Pincott, Dezaray Hawes, Samantha Fisher	(British Columbia) Mary-Anne Arsenault, Jeanna Schraeder, Sasha Carter, Renee Simons	$15,200	$4,000
2021	(British Columbia) Kaila Buchy, Jaelyn Cotter, Katelyn McGillivray, Hannah Lindner	(British Columbia) Mary-Anne Arsenault, Jeanna Schraeder, Sasha Carter, Renee Simons	$8,400	$3,000
