= Ashley Klymchuk =

Canadian curler

- Curler
- Born: Ashley Nordin; May 4, 1993 (age 33); Kamloops, British Columbia

Team
- Curling club: Kamloops Curling Club, Kamloops, BC

Curling career
- Member Association: British Columbia
- Hearts: 1 (2020)
- Top CTRS ranking: 8th (2019–20)

Ashley Klymchuk (born May 4, 1993, as Ashley Nordin) is a Canadian curler from Kamloops, British Columbia.

== Career ==
Klymchuk competed in two U Sports/Curling Canada University Championships for the Thompson Rivers University WolfPack in 2015 and 2016. At the 2015 Championship, her team of Corryn Brown, Erin Pincott and Samantha Fisher made it all the way to the final where they lost to the Alberta Pandas skipped by Kelsey Rocque. In 2016, they once again lost the final to the Pandas.

She competed in her first British Columbia Scotties Tournament of Hearts in 2015 as second for a team which consisted of her three sisters, Courtney Karwandy, Crista Sanbrooks and skip Amanda Russett. They finished winless in the triple knockout bracket, going 0–3. The team returned the following year where they would finish in last with a 1–6 record.

Klymchuk took a season off curling before joining former teammates Corryn Brown and Erin Pincott who brought on Dezaray Hawes for the 2018–19 season. Team Brown played in seven tour events and qualified in six of the seven including winning the King Cash Spiel and the Sunset Ranch Kelowna Double Cash. It was Klymchuk's first tour event win. At the 2019 British Columbia Scotties Tournament of Hearts they lost the final to Sarah Wark.

In their first event of the 2019–20 season, they missed the playoffs at the Booster Juice Shoot-Out. They then missed the playoffs at the 2019 Colonial Square Ladies Classic. They then made the playoffs at six straight events starting with the Prestige Hotels & Resorts Curling Classic where they made it to the quarterfinals. The following week, they won the Driving Force Decks Int'l Abbotsford Cashspiel and two weeks after that they won the Kamloops Crown of Curling. Their next event was the Tour Challenge Tier 2 where they lost to Jestyn Murphy in the semifinal. They also made the semifinal at the Red Deer Curling Classic. They lost the final of the 2019 China Open in mid-December, their last event of 2019. Klymchuk won her first provincial title at the 2020 British Columbia Scotties Tournament of Hearts where this year they defeated Wark's rink by stealing the extra end. At the 2020 Scotties Tournament of Hearts, Team BC finished with a 5–6 record and they finished in sixth place.

== Personal life ==
Klymchuk works as a teacher. She is married to Tyler Klymchuk. Klymchuk had twins in September 2020, and as a result announced she would be leaving Team Brown.

== Teams ==
Season	Skip	Third	Second	Lead
2011–12	Brandi Tinkler	Ashley Nordin	Erin Bartlett	Emily Dagg
2012–13	Brandi Tinkler	Ashley Nordin	Alexandra Nash-McLeod	
2013–14	Brandi Tinkler	Ashley Nordin	Zetteh Gunner	Nicky Block
2014–15	Amanda Russett	Crista Sanbrooks	Ashley Nordin	Courtney Karwandy
2015–16	Amanda Russett	Crista Sanbrooks	Ashley Nordin	Courtney Karwandy
2016–17	Amanda Russett	Ashley Nordin	Tiffany Olsen	Kelsey Redan
2018–19	Corryn Brown	Erin Pincott	Dezaray Hawes	Ashley Klymchuk
2019–20	Corryn Brown	Erin Pincott	Dezaray Hawes	Ashley Klymchuk
