= Dezaray Hawes =

Canadian curler (born 1997)

- Curler
- Born: January 23, 1997 (age 29); New Westminster, British Columbia

Team
- Curling club: Kelowna CC, Kelowna, BC
- Skip: Selena Sturmay
- Third: Danielle Schmiemann
- Second: Dezaray Hawes
- Lead: Paige Papley
- Alternate: Brianna Cullen

Curling career
- Member Association: British Columbia (2012–2023); Alberta (2023–present)
- Hearts: 5 (2020, 2021, 2024, 2025, 2026)
- Top CTRS ranking: 5th (2023–24)
Medal record
Women's curling
Representing Alberta
Scotties Tournament of Hearts
Bronze medal – third place	2026 Mississauga

Dezaray Hawes (born January 23, 1997) is a Canadian curler from Calgary, Alberta. She currently plays second on Team Selena Sturmay.

== Career ==
=== Juniors ===
Hawes was the second on Team British Columbia skipped by Sarah Daniels at the 2016 Canadian Junior Curling Championships. The team won a silver medal after losing the final to Nova Scotia's Mary Fay. She returned the following year as second for Corryn Brown where the team went 5–5. Hawes also placed fifth with the Daniels rink in 2015 at the 2015 Canada Winter Games.

Hawes won her first World Curling Tour event in 2016 at the Qinghai China Ladies International. She also played in her first Grand Slam of Curling event when she was just 19, the Tour Challenge Tier 2 where her team went 1–3.

Team Brown had multiple playoff appearances in tour events during the 2017–18 season even though they were still a junior team. They lost in the semifinals of the Driving Force Abbotsford Cashspiel and the King Cash Spiel and lost in the quarterfinals of the Kamloops Crown of Curling. She played with Ciera Fischer at the junior provincials however they went 3–4 during the round robin and did not advance to the playoffs. Back with Team Brown, the team made it all the way to the semifinal of the 2018 British Columbia Scotties Tournament of Hearts, the provincial women's curling championship. The rink also won a silver medal at the 2018 U Sports/Curling Canada University Championships, losing the final to Kristen Streifel.

=== Women's ===
Out of juniors, Team Brown stayed together and played in seven tour events during the 2018–19 season and qualified in six of the seven including winning the King Cash Spiel once again and the Sunset Ranch Kelowna Double Cash. They improved by one spot at the 2019 British Columbia Scotties Tournament of Hearts where they lost the final to Sarah Wark's rink.

In their first event of the 2019–20 season, they missed the playoffs at the Booster Juice Shoot-Out. They then missed the playoffs at the 2019 Colonial Square Ladies Classic. They then made the playoffs at six straight events starting with the Prestige Hotels & Resorts Curling Classic where they made it to the quarterfinals. The following week, they won the Driving Force Decks Int'l Abbotsford Cashspiel and two weeks after that they won the Kamloops Crown of Curling. Their next event was the Tour Challenge Tier 2 where they lost to Jestyn Murphy in the semifinal. They also made the semifinal at the Red Deer Curling Classic. They lost the final of the 2019 China Open in mid-December, their last event of 2019. Hawes won her first provincial title at the 2020 British Columbia Scotties Tournament of Hearts where this year they defeated Wark's rink by stealing the extra end. At the 2020 Scotties Tournament of Hearts, Team BC finished with a 5–6 record and they finished in sixth place. After the season, Ashley Klymchuk left the team due to her pregnancy and was replaced by Samantha Fisher who previously played on the team before deciding to focus on her studies. Hawes and Erin Pincott continued at second and third respectively.

Team Brown began the 2020–21 curling season by winning the 2020 Sunset Ranch Kelowna Double Cash. Due to the COVID-19 pandemic in British Columbia, the 2021 provincial championship was cancelled. As the reigning provincial champions, Team Brown was invited to represent British Columbia at the 2021 Scotties Tournament of Hearts, which they accepted. At the Hearts, they finished a 4–4 round robin record, failing to qualify for the championship round.

To begin the 2021–22 season, the Brown rink won the Alberta Curling Series: Leduc event. They then played in the 2021 Alberta Curling Series: Saville Shoot-Out where they went undefeated until the semifinals where they were defeated by Laura Walker. Due to the pandemic, the qualification process for the 2021 Canadian Olympic Curling Trials had to be modified to qualify enough teams for the championship. In these modifications, Curling Canada created the 2021 Canadian Curling Trials Direct-Entry Event, an event where five teams would compete to try to earn one of three spots into the 2021 Canadian Olympic Curling Trials. Team Brown qualified for the Trials Direct-Entry Event due to their CTRS ranking from the 2019–20 season. At the event, the team went 1–3 through the round robin, qualifying for the tiebreaker round where they faced Alberta's Walker rink. After winning the first game, Team Brown lost the second and final tiebreaker, not earning direct qualification into the Trials. The team had one final chance to advance to the Olympic Trials through the 2021 Canadian Olympic Curling Pre-Trials where they finished the round-robin with a 4–2 record. This qualified them for the double knockout round, where they beat both Mackenzie Zacharias and Sherry Anderson to advance to the final qualifier. There, they lost 9–2 to Jacqueline Harrison, ending their chances of reaching the Olympic Trials. Back on tour, the team played in their first Grand Slam of Curling event, the 2021 National, which they qualified for due to their successful results throughout the season. They finished 2–3 through the triple knockout event, just missing the playoffs. At the 2022 British Columbia Scotties Tournament of Hearts, Team Brown entered as the number one seeds, however, lost two qualifying games against Kayla MacMillan and Diane Gushulak, qualifying through the C side. They then lost the 3 vs. 4 game to Sarah Wark, eliminating them from provincials.

Team Brown struggled at the beginning of the 2022–23 season, failing to qualify for the playoffs in their first three events. They turned thing around at the Prestige Hotels & Resorts Curling Classic, losing just one game en route to capturing the event title. Later that month, they won their second title at the Kamloops Crown of Curling. Despite only entering the playoffs in two of their eight tour events, Team Brown found immediate success at the 2023 British Columbia Scotties Tournament of Hearts, defeating the number one ranked Clancy Grandy rink in both the A qualifier and the 1 vs. 2 page playoff. In the final, again facing Grandy, they fell 10–9 in an extra end, failing to qualify for the 2023 Scotties Tournament of Hearts which was held in their home city of Kamloops. In March 2023, the team announced they would be parting ways with Hawes as she would be moving to Alberta. It was later announced that she would play second on the Selena Sturmay rink with third Danielle Schmiemann and lead Paige Papley for the 2023–24 season.

The new Sturmay team had mixed results to begin the season, qualifying for the playoffs in three of their first five events but never advancing past the quarterfinals. The team turned things around in October, however, beginning at the Saville Grand Prix where after an opening draw loss, they ran the table to claim the title. They continued their momentum into the Red Deer Curling Classic where they advanced all the way to the final before losing to the Rachel Homan rink. In their next two events, they reached the semifinals of the DeKalb Superspiel and the final of the MCT Championships, losing out to Xenia Schwaller and Beth Peterson respectively. In the new year, the team got a last-minute call to play in the 2024 Canadian Open after Stefania Constantini dropped out due to illness. There, they finished with a 1–3 record, defeating Jolene Campbell in their sole victory. Next was the 2024 Alberta Scotties Tournament of Hearts where Team Sturmay finished first through the round robin with a 6–1 record, earning them a bye to the final. There, they faced defending champions Team Skrlik. Down one without the hammer in the tenth, the team stole two after Kayla Skrlik's final draw went through the rings. This qualified the team for the 2024 Scotties Tournament of Hearts. The Alberta squad had a stellar performance through the round robin, finishing first through their pool with a 7–1 record. This included wins over Scotties veterans Kerri Einarson, Kaitlyn Lawes and Krista McCarville. After losing to Jennifer Jones in the first round of the championship, they again beat Lawes to advance to the playoffs. There, they fell 6–4 to Manitoba's Kate Cameron in the 3 vs. 4 game, finishing fourth. The following season, in a change to the qualification process, three teams in the field at the Scotties Tournament of Hearts pre-qualified for the 2025 Scotties based on their 2023–24 Canadian Team Ranking Standings, and Curling Canada announced Sturmay would be one of these teams, which meant they bypassed and did not have to play in the 2025 Alberta provincial championship. At the 2025 Scotties, Team Sturmay would finish 4–4 after round robin play, failing to qualify for the playoffs.

Team Sturmay's success over the 2023–25 seasons and Canadian Team Ranking Standings qualified Sturmay for the 2025 Canadian Olympic Curling Pre-Trials. At the 2025 Pre-Trials, the Sturmay rink would win the event, finishing first in the round robin with a 5–2 record and then beating Kayla MacMillan 2 games to 1 in the best-of-three final. This would qualify the rink for the 2025 Canadian Olympic Curling Trials, with a shot to represent Canada at the 2026 Winter Olympics. There, Sturmay would finish with a 4–3 record, finishing 4th and just missing out on the playoffs. Team Sturmay would continue their success, winning the 2026 Alberta Women's Curling Championship, beating Serena Gray-Withers 9–5 in the final, qualifying Sturmay to represent Alberta at the 2026 Scotties Tournament of Hearts. At the 2026 Scotties, Sturmay would improve on their previous performances, going 6–2 in the round-robin, and qualify for the playoffs. After beating Nova Scotia's Christina Black in the 3v4 game, Sturmay would then lose to Kerri Einarson 12–5 in the semifinal, winning the bronze medal.

=== Mixed doubles ===
Aside from team curling, Hawes plays mixed doubles with her partner Tyler Tardi. The duo has competed in three Canadian Mixed Doubles Curling Championship with their best finish in 2019 where they lost in the quarterfinals.

== Personal life ==
Hawes works as a senior administrator for the MNP LLP. She is married to fellow curler Tyler Tardi. She attended Heritage Woods Secondary School and Thompson Rivers University.

== Teams ==
Season	Skip	Third	Second	Lead
2012–13	Dezaray Hawes	Gabrielle Plonka	Ali Renwick	Caitlin Campbell
2013–14	Dezaray Hawes	Gabrielle Plonka	Ali Renwick	Casey Freeman
2014–15	Sarah Daniels	Marika Van Osch	Dezaray Hawes	Megan Daniels
2015–16	Sarah Daniels	Marika Van Osch	Dezaray Hawes	Megan Daniels
2016–17	Corryn Brown	Marika Van Osch	Dezaray Hawes	Samantha Fisher
2017–18	Corryn Brown	Erin Pincott	Dezaray Hawes	Samantha Fisher
2018–19	Corryn Brown	Erin Pincott	Dezaray Hawes	Ashley Klymchuk
2019–20	Corryn Brown	Erin Pincott	Dezaray Hawes	Ashley Klymchuk
2020–21	Corryn Brown	Erin Pincott	Dezaray Hawes	Samantha Fisher
2021–22	Corryn Brown	Erin Pincott	Dezaray Hawes	Samantha Fisher
2022–23	Corryn Brown	Erin Pincott	Dezaray Hawes	Samantha Fisher
2023–24	Selena Sturmay	Danielle Schmiemann	Dezaray Hawes	Paige Papley
2024–25	Selena Sturmay	Danielle Schmiemann	Dezaray Hawes	Paige Papley
2025–26	Selena Sturmay	Danielle Schmiemann	Dezaray Hawes	Paige Papley
2026–27	Selena Sturmay	Danielle Schmiemann	Dezaray Hawes	Paige Papley
