= 2020 Scotties Tournament of Hearts =

Canadian women's curling tournament

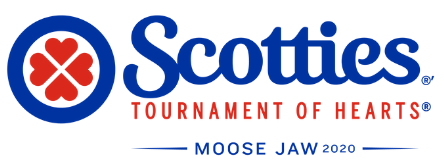
- Host city: Moose Jaw, Saskatchewan
- Arena: Mosaic Place
- Dates: February 15–23
- Attendance: 59,298
- Winner: Manitoba
- Curling club: Gimli CC, Gimli
- Skip: Kerri Einarson
- Third: Val Sweeting
- Second: Shannon Birchard
- Lead: Briane Meilleur
- Alternate: Jennifer Clark-Rouire
- Coach: Patti Wuthrich
- Finalist: Ontario (Rachel Homan)

The 2020 Scotties Tournament of Hearts, Canada's national women's curling championship, was held from February 15 to 23 at Mosaic Place in Moose Jaw, Saskatchewan. The winning team was scheduled to represent Canada at the 2020 World Women's Curling Championship at the CN Centre in Prince George, British Columbia.

Manitoba's Kerri Einarson defeated Ontario's Rachel Homan 8–7 in the final.

On February 18, New Brunswick's Andrea Crawford rink scored seven points in the seventh end to set a new Canadian women's national championship record for most points scored in a single end, going on to defeat Kerri Einarson's undefeated and top-ranked Manitoba rink 13–7 in Draw 10 of the tournament. In Draw 12 on February 19, Northern Ontario skip Krista McCarville curled a perfect 100% game in a 4–3 win over Alberta's Laura Walker.

This Tournament of Hearts marked the second time that Moose Jaw has hosted the Scotties; the first time that the Scotties was hosted in Moose Jaw was in 2015.

== Teams ==
Canada	Alberta	British Columbia	Manitoba
The Glencoe Club, Calgary Skip: Chelsea Carey; Third: Sarah Wilkes; Second: Dana Ferguson; Lead: Rachelle Brown	Saville SC, Edmonton Skip: Laura Walker; Third: Kate Cameron; Second: Taylor McDonald (Note: Team Alberta's alternate Kelsey Rocque threw second stones for the last two ends of Draws 2 and 5.); Lead: Nadine Scotland; Alternate: Kelsey Rocque	Kamloops CC, Kamloops Skip: Corryn Brown; Third: Erin Pincott; Second: Dezaray Hawes (Note: Team British Columbia's alternate Dailene Pewarchuk threw second stones during Draws 12 and 13.); Lead: Ashley Klymchuk; Alternate: Dailene Pewarchuk	Gimli CC, Gimli Skip: Kerri Einarson; Third: Val Sweeting (Note: Team Manitoba's alternate Jennifer Clark-Rouire threw third stones for the last two ends of Draw 18.); Second: Shannon Birchard; Lead: Briane Meilleur; Alternate: Jennifer Clark-Rouire
New Brunswick	Newfoundland and Labrador	Northern Ontario	Nova Scotia
Gage Golf & CC, Oromocto Skip: Andrea Crawford; Third: Jennifer Armstrong; Second: Jillian Babin; Lead: Katie Forward	St. John's CC, St. John's Skip: Erica Curtis; Third: Erin Porter; Second: Julie Devereaux; Lead: Beth Hamilton	Fort William CC, Thunder Bay Skip: Krista McCarville; Third: Kendra Lilly; Second: Ashley Sippala; Lead: Jen Gates	Mayflower CC, Halifax Skip: Mary-Anne Arsenault; Third: Christina Black; Second: Jenn Baxter; Lead: Emma Logan (Note: Team Nova Scotia's alternate Kristin Clarke threw lead stones for the last four ends of Draw 6.); Alternate: Kristin Clarke
Ontario	Prince Edward Island	Quebec	Saskatchewan
Ottawa CC, Ottawa Skip: Rachel Homan; Third: Emma Miskew; Second: Joanne Courtney (Note: Team Ontario's alternate Cheryl Kreviazuk threw lead stones for the first end of Draw 11 and second stones for the first end of Draw 13.); Lead: Lisa Weagle; Alternate: Cheryl Kreviazuk	Montague CC, Montague Skip: Suzanne Birt; Third: Marie Christianson; Second: Meaghan Hughes; Lead: Michelle McQuaid	CC Chicoutimi, Chicoutimi; Glenmore CC, Dollard-des-Ormeaux; CC Trois-Rivières, Trois-Rivières Skip: Noémie Verreault; Third: Alanna Routledge; Second: Marie-Pier Côté; Lead: Jill Routledge; Alternate: Joëlle St-Hilaire	Twin Rivers CC, North Battleford Skip: Robyn Silvernagle; Third: Stefanie Lawton; Second: Jessie Hunkin (Note: Team Saskatchewan's alternate Stephanie Schmidt threw second stones for the last four ends of Draw 11 and the last three ends of Draw 18.); Lead: Kara Thevenot; Alternate: Stephanie Schmidt
Northwest Territories	Nunavut	Yukon	(Manitoba) Wild Card
Yellowknife CC, Yellowknife Fourth: Jo-Ann Rizzo; Third: Sarah Koltun; Skip: Kerry Galusha; Lead: Shona Barbour; Alternate: Stacey Stabel	Iqaluit CC, Iqaluit Skip: Lori Eddy; Third: Sadie Pinksen; Second: Alison Griffin; Lead: Kaitlin MacDonald	Whitehorse CC, Whitehorse Skip: Hailey Birnie; Third: Chelsea Duncan; Second: Gabrielle Plonka; Lead: Kimberly Tuor; Alternate: Rhonda Horte	St. Vital CC, Winnipeg Skip: Jennifer Jones; Third: Kaitlyn Lawes; Second: Jocelyn Peterman; Lead: Dawn McEwen

=== CTRS ranking ===
Member Association (Skip)	Rank	Points
Manitoba (Einarson)	2	355.869
(Manitoba) Wild Card (Jones)	3	326.039
Ontario (Homan)	4	276.838
Canada (Carey)	5	216.495
Alberta (Walker)	7	170.044
British Columbia (Brown)	8	158.556
Prince Edward Island (Birt)	9	137.473
Saskatchewan (Silvernagle)	12	118.440
Northern Ontario (McCarville)	27	79.104
Northwest Territories (Galusha)	30	69.190
Nova Scotia (Arsenault)	31	67.961
New Brunswick (Crawford)	45	47.048
Nunavut (Eddy)	133	1.740
Newfoundland and Labrador (Curtis)	NR	0.000
Quebec (Verreault)	NR	0.000
Yukon (Birnie)	NR	0.000

== Wild card game ==
A wild card play-in game was played on February 14. It was contested between the top two teams on the Canadian Team Ranking System standings who did not win their provincial championship: the East St. Paul Curling Club's Tracy Fleury rink, and the St. Vital Curling Club's Jennifer Jones rink, both curling in the Winnipeg Metro Region. Team Wild Card entered the Scotties as the number 3 seed.

CTRS standings for wild card game
Rank	Team	Member Association	Eligibility
1	Tracy Fleury	Manitoba	Eliminated from provincials
2	~~Kerri Einarson~~	Manitoba	Won provincials
3	Jennifer Jones	Manitoba	Eliminated from provincials

Wild card Game

Friday, February 14, 7:30 pm

Sheet C	1	2	3	4	5	6	7	8	9	10	Final
(Manitoba) Jennifer Jones 🔨	0	0	2	0	3	0	0	2	0	1	8
(Manitoba) Tracy Fleury	0	1	0	2	0	1	0	0	3	0	7

Player percentages
(Manitoba) Team Jones		(Manitoba) Team Fleury	
Dawn McEwen	98%	Kristin MacCuish	88%
Jocelyn Peterman	80%	Liz Fyfe	74%
Kaitlyn Lawes	86%	Selena Njegovan	78%
Jennifer Jones	74%	Tracy Fleury	78%
Total	84%	Total	79%

== Map of teams ==
Team Canada Provincial Winners Wild-Card Team

== Round robin standings ==
Final Round Robin Standings

Key
Teams to Championship pool
Teams to Tiebreakers

Pool A	Skip	W	L	PF	PA	EW	EL	BE	SE	S%
Manitoba	Kerri Einarson	6	1	54	44	31	30	2	8	83%
Northern Ontario	Krista McCarville	5	2	46	33	31	25	8	12	80%
Canada	Chelsea Carey	4	3	44	44	36	28	2	9	82%
Saskatchewan	Robyn Silvernagle	4	3	44	43	26	29	8	7	81%
New Brunswick	Andrea Crawford	4	3	46	43	29	25	2	7	79%
Alberta	Laura Walker	3	4	42	35	30	26	2	7	82%
Nunavut	Lori Eddy	2	5	35	47	26	30	7	7	67%
Quebec	Noémie Verreault	0	7	36	58	21	37	1	1	71%

Pool B	Skip	W	L	PF	PA	EW	EL	BE	SE	S%
Ontario	Rachel Homan	6	1	64	42	33	28	3	7	83%
(Manitoba) Wild Card	Jennifer Jones	6	1	63	42	35	28	2	9	79%
Prince Edward Island	Suzanne Birt	5	2	57	42	35	29	2	10	80%
British Columbia	Corryn Brown	4	3	56	51	30	32	4	7	79%
Nova Scotia	Mary-Anne Arsenault	4	3	54	45	33	27	2	12	77%
Northwest Territories	Kerry Galusha	2	5	49	51	29	30	1	7	75%
Newfoundland and Labrador	Erica Curtis	1	6	31	60	24	33	1	5	71%
Yukon	Hailey Birnie	0	7	26	67	21	33	4	3	66%

== Round robin results ==
All draw times are listed in Central Time (UTC−06:00).

=== Draw 1 ===
Saturday, February 15, 1:30 pm

Sheet A	1	2	3	4	5	6	7	8	9	10	Final
Northern Ontario (McCarville) 🔨	0	1	0	2	0	1	0	3	1	X	8
Canada (Carey)	0	0	1	0	1	0	1	0	0	X	3

Sheet B	1	2	3	4	5	6	7	8	9	10	Final
Saskatchewan (Silvernagle)	0	0	0	1	2	1	0	0	2	X	6
New Brunswick (Crawford) 🔨	1	0	0	0	0	0	1	2	0	X	4

Sheet C	1	2	3	4	5	6	7	8	9	10	Final
Prince Edward Island (Birt) 🔨	0	1	0	2	0	0	1	0	0	1	5
British Columbia (Brown)	2	0	1	0	0	1	0	1	2	0	7

Sheet D	1	2	3	4	5	6	7	8	9	10	Final
Northwest Territories (Galusha) 🔨	0	1	0	0	0	1	0	2	1	1	6
Nova Scotia (Arsenault)	0	0	1	2	2	0	3	0	0	0	8

=== Draw 2 ===
Saturday, February 15, 6:30 pm

Sheet A	1	2	3	4	5	6	7	8	9	10	Final
(Manitoba) Wild Card (Jones) 🔨	2	0	1	0	0	0	2	0	1	X	6
Ontario (Homan)	0	2	0	2	3	1	0	1	0	X	9

Sheet B	1	2	3	4	5	6	7	8	9	10	Final
Newfoundland and Labrador (Curtis)	0	2	1	0	2	0	0	0	1	X	6
Yukon (Birnie) 🔨	1	0	0	1	0	0	0	1	0	X	3

Sheet C	1	2	3	4	5	6	7	8	9	10	Final
Quebec (Verreault) 🔨	2	0	0	0	0	1	0	1	X	X	4
Manitoba (Einarson)	0	1	2	2	2	0	2	0	X	X	9

Sheet D	1	2	3	4	5	6	7	8	9	10	Final
Nunavut (Eddy)	1	0	0	1	0	0	0	1	X	X	3
Alberta (Walker) 🔨	0	2	3	0	1	1	1	0	X	X	8

=== Draw 3 ===
Sunday, February 16, 8:30 am

Sheet A	1	2	3	4	5	6	7	8	9	10	Final
Manitoba (Einarson)	2	0	1	0	0	0	0	1	2	X	6
Nunavut (Eddy) 🔨	0	0	0	2	1	0	1	0	0	X	4

Sheet B	1	2	3	4	5	6	7	8	9	10	Final
Quebec (Verreault)	0	1	0	1	0	0	0	1	0	X	3
Alberta (Walker) 🔨	1	0	2	0	3	1	0	0	1	X	8

Sheet C	1	2	3	4	5	6	7	8	9	10	Final
Yukon (Birnie)	0	0	0	0	1	0	0	0	X	X	1
(Manitoba) Wild Card (Jones) 🔨	2	0	2	1	0	3	0	2	X	X	10

Sheet D	1	2	3	4	5	6	7	8	9	10	Final
Newfoundland and Labrador (Curtis) 🔨	1	0	0	1	0	2	0	1	0	X	5
Ontario (Homan)	0	5	1	0	1	0	1	0	2	X	10

=== Draw 4 ===
Sunday, February 16, 1:30 pm

Sheet A	1	2	3	4	5	6	7	8	9	10	Final
British Columbia (Brown) 🔨	0	1	1	0	2	0	4	0	0	X	8
Northwest Territories (Galusha)	0	0	0	1	0	1	0	2	1	X	5

Sheet B	1	2	3	4	5	6	7	8	9	10	Final
Prince Edward Island (Birt)	2	0	2	0	0	1	0	0	2	X	7
Nova Scotia (Arsenault) 🔨	0	1	0	1	0	0	1	0	0	X	3

Sheet C	1	2	3	4	5	6	7	8	9	10	Final
New Brunswick (Crawford) 🔨	0	0	1	0	1	0	0	1	X	X	3
Northern Ontario (McCarville)	2	2	0	1	0	1	3	0	X	X	9

Sheet D	1	2	3	4	5	6	7	8	9	10	Final
Saskatchewan (Silvernagle) 🔨	2	0	0	0	2	0	0	2	0	0	6
Canada (Carey)	0	1	1	1	0	1	1	0	2	2	9

=== Draw 5 ===
Sunday, February 16, 6:30 pm

Sheet A	1	2	3	4	5	6	7	8	9	10	Final
Alberta (Walker)	0	1	2	2	0	2	0	1	X	X	8
New Brunswick (Crawford) 🔨	1	0	0	0	1	0	1	0	X	X	3

Sheet B	1	2	3	4	5	6	7	8	9	10	Final
Nunavut (Eddy) 🔨	1	3	0	0	1	0	1	0	2	X	8
Saskatchewan (Silvernagle)	0	0	3	3	0	2	0	3	0	X	11

Sheet C	1	2	3	4	5	6	7	8	9	10	11	Final
Ontario (Homan) 🔨	0	2	0	1	0	2	0	2	0	1	0	8
Prince Edward Island (Birt)	1	0	1	0	2	0	2	0	2	0	1	9

Sheet D	1	2	3	4	5	6	7	8	9	10	Final
(Manitoba) Wild Card (Jones) 🔨	0	0	1	0	3	4	0	1	0	2	11
British Columbia (Brown)	3	1	0	2	0	0	2	0	2	0	10

=== Draw 6 ===
Monday, February 17, 8:30 am

Sheet A	1	2	3	4	5	6	7	8	9	10	Final
Nova Scotia (Arsenault) 🔨	0	2	1	2	2	0	2	0	1	X	10
Yukon (Birnie)	0	0	0	0	0	2	0	2	0	X	4

Sheet B	1	2	3	4	5	6	7	8	9	10	Final
Northwest Territories (Galusha) 🔨	2	2	3	1	0	2	4	0	X	X	14
Newfoundland and Labrador (Curtis)	0	0	0	0	1	0	0	1	X	X	2

Sheet C	1	2	3	4	5	6	7	8	9	10	11	Final
Canada (Carey)	0	2	1	0	1	0	1	1	1	0	2	9
Quebec (Verreault) 🔨	3	0	0	1	0	2	0	0	0	1	0	7

Sheet D	1	2	3	4	5	6	7	8	9	10	Final
Northern Ontario (McCarville)	0	2	0	1	0	1	1	0	2	0	7
Manitoba (Einarson) 🔨	1	0	2	0	1	0	0	2	0	2	8

=== Draw 7 ===
Monday, February 17, 1:30 pm

Sheet A	1	2	3	4	5	6	7	8	9	10	Final
Quebec (Verreault) 🔨	0	3	0	2	0	2	0	0	0	X	7
Northern Ontario (McCarville)	1	0	3	0	1	0	1	1	2	X	9

Sheet B	1	2	3	4	5	6	7	8	9	10	11	Final
Manitoba (Einarson) 🔨	0	1	0	1	0	0	1	0	2	0	1	6
Canada (Carey)	0	0	1	0	0	1	0	2	0	1	0	5

Sheet C	1	2	3	4	5	6	7	8	9	10	Final
Newfoundland and Labrador (Curtis)	0	2	1	0	0	0	0	2	0	0	5
Nova Scotia (Arsenault) 🔨	0	0	0	2	1	1	0	0	3	2	9

Sheet D	1	2	3	4	5	6	7	8	9	10	Final
Yukon (Birnie)	0	1	0	1	0	1	1	1	0	X	5
Northwest Territories (Galusha) 🔨	1	0	5	0	2	0	0	0	1	X	9

=== Draw 8 ===
Monday, February 17, 6:30 pm

Sheet A	1	2	3	4	5	6	7	8	9	10	11	Final
Prince Edward Island (Birt) 🔨	0	2	1	0	1	0	2	0	2	0	0	8
(Manitoba) Wild Card (Jones)	2	0	0	1	0	2	0	2	0	1	1	9

Sheet B	1	2	3	4	5	6	7	8	9	10	Final
British Columbia (Brown) 🔨	2	0	0	2	0	2	0	1	0	0	7
Ontario (Homan)	0	2	0	0	2	0	2	0	2	1	9

Sheet C	1	2	3	4	5	6	7	8	9	10	Final
Saskatchewan (Silvernagle)	0	2	0	0	3	0	1	1	0	X	7
Alberta (Walker) 🔨	1	0	0	2	0	1	0	0	1	X	5

Sheet D	1	2	3	4	5	6	7	8	9	10	Final
New Brunswick (Crawford) 🔨	1	2	0	1	0	0	0	0	1	X	5
Nunavut (Eddy)	0	0	1	0	0	0	0	1	0	X	2

=== Draw 9 ===
Tuesday, February 18, 8:30 am

Sheet A	1	2	3	4	5	6	7	8	9	10	Final
Canada (Carey) 🔨	2	0	1	0	2	0	1	0	1	X	7
Alberta (Walker)	0	1	0	1	0	2	0	1	0	X	5

Sheet B	1	2	3	4	5	6	7	8	9	10	Final
Northern Ontario (McCarville) 🔨	1	0	0	2	2	0	0	0	0	0	5
Nunavut (Eddy)	0	0	1	0	0	2	0	1	1	1	6

Sheet C	1	2	3	4	5	6	7	8	9	10	Final
British Columbia (Brown)	0	1	1	0	2	0	3	0	5	X	12
Yukon (Birnie) 🔨	1	0	0	1	0	1	0	2	0	X	5

Sheet D	1	2	3	4	5	6	7	8	9	10	Final
Prince Edward Island (Birt) 🔨	2	1	0	1	0	0	2	3	X	X	9
Newfoundland and Labrador (Curtis)	0	0	1	0	1	1	0	0	X	X	3

=== Draw 10 ===
Tuesday, February 18, 1:30 pm

Sheet A	1	2	3	4	5	6	7	8	9	10	Final
Ontario (Homan)	0	2	0	3	0	2	2	0	1	X	10
Nova Scotia (Arsenault) 🔨	2	0	2	0	1	0	0	2	0	X	7

Sheet B	1	2	3	4	5	6	7	8	9	10	Final
(Manitoba) Wild Card (Jones) 🔨	2	1	0	1	0	2	0	5	X	X	11
Northwest Territories (Galusha)	0	0	1	0	1	0	1	0	X	X	3

Sheet C	1	2	3	4	5	6	7	8	9	10	Final
Manitoba (Einarson)	0	2	0	0	0	2	0	3	0	X	7
New Brunswick (Crawford) 🔨	1	0	1	1	1	0	7	0	2	X	13

New Brunswick's seven-ender scored against Manitoba was the most points scored in a single end in Tournament of Hearts history.

Sheet D	1	2	3	4	5	6	7	8	9	10	Final
Quebec (Verreault)	0	0	0	0	2	0	0	1	0	0	3
Saskatchewan (Silvernagle) 🔨	0	0	0	3	0	0	1	0	0	1	5

=== Draw 11 ===
Tuesday, February 18, 6:30 pm

Sheet A	1	2	3	4	5	6	7	8	9	10	Final
Saskatchewan (Silvernagle)	0	0	2	0	1	1	1	0	1	X	6
Manitoba (Einarson) 🔨	1	3	0	5	0	0	0	1	0	X	10

Sheet B	1	2	3	4	5	6	7	8	9	10	Final
New Brunswick (Crawford) 🔨	0	1	0	2	2	0	2	3	1	X	11
Quebec (Verreault)	0	0	2	0	0	4	0	0	0	X	6

Sheet C	1	2	3	4	5	6	7	8	9	10	Final
Northwest Territories (Galusha)	0	0	1	0	2	0	0	2	X	X	5
Ontario (Homan) 🔨	0	2	0	3	0	2	2	0	X	X	9

Sheet D	1	2	3	4	5	6	7	8	9	10	11	Final
Nova Scotia (Arsenault) 🔨	1	0	1	0	1	0	0	2	0	2	0	7
(Manitoba) Wild Card (Jones)	0	1	0	0	0	2	1	0	3	0	2	9

=== Draw 12 ===
Wednesday, February 19, 8:30 am

Sheet A	1	2	3	4	5	6	7	8	9	10	Final
Newfoundland and Labrador (Curtis)	0	0	1	0	1	0	0	2	2	X	6
British Columbia (Brown) 🔨	0	1	0	4	0	1	2	0	0	X	8

Sheet B	1	2	3	4	5	6	7	8	9	10	Final
Yukon (Birnie) 🔨	0	2	0	1	0	0	0	2	X	X	5
Prince Edward Island (Birt)	1	0	1	0	5	3	1	0	X	X	11

Sheet C	1	2	3	4	5	6	7	8	9	10	Final
Nunavut (Eddy)	0	0	1	0	3	0	1	0	0	0	5
Canada (Carey) 🔨	1	0	0	1	0	1	0	1	1	1	6

Sheet D	1	2	3	4	5	6	7	8	9	10	Final
Alberta (Walker) 🔨	0	1	0	0	0	0	1	0	0	1	3
Northern Ontario (McCarville)	1	0	0	1	0	2	0	0	0	0	4

Northern Ontario skip Krista McCarville curled a perfect 100% game.

=== Draw 13 ===
Wednesday, February 19, 1:30 pm

Sheet A	1	2	3	4	5	6	7	8	9	10	Final
Northwest Territories (Galusha) 🔨	2	0	0	0	1	0	2	0	2	0	7
Prince Edward Island (Birt)	0	1	2	2	0	1	0	1	0	1	8

Sheet B	1	2	3	4	5	6	7	8	9	10	Final
Nova Scotia (Arsenault)	1	0	2	1	1	0	1	0	4	X	10
British Columbia (Brown) 🔨	0	1	0	0	0	2	0	1	0	X	4

Sheet C	1	2	3	4	5	6	7	8	9	10	Final
(Manitoba) Wild Card (Jones)	1	0	0	1	0	1	0	3	0	1	7
Newfoundland and Labrador (Curtis) 🔨	0	1	0	0	1	0	1	0	1	0	4

Sheet D	1	2	3	4	5	6	7	8	9	10	Final
Ontario (Homan) 🔨	0	1	0	0	0	3	2	0	3	X	9
Yukon (Birnie)	0	0	1	0	1	0	0	1	0	X	3

=== Draw 14 ===
Wednesday, February 19, 6:30 pm

Sheet A	1	2	3	4	5	6	7	8	9	10	Final
Nunavut (Eddy) 🔨	2	0	1	0	0	1	0	2	0	1	7
Quebec (Verreault)	0	2	0	1	0	0	2	0	1	0	6

Sheet B	1	2	3	4	5	6	7	8	9	10	Final
Alberta (Walker) 🔨	1	0	0	1	0	1	0	2	0	X	5
Manitoba (Einarson)	0	2	1	0	1	0	2	0	2	X	8

Sheet C	1	2	3	4	5	6	7	8	9	10	11	Final
Northern Ontario (McCarville) 🔨	0	0	1	1	0	0	0	1	0	0	1	4
Saskatchewan (Silvernagle)	0	0	0	0	1	1	0	0	0	1	0	3

Sheet D	1	2	3	4	5	6	7	8	9	10	Final
Canada (Carey) 🔨	0	1	0	0	2	0	1	0	1	0	5
New Brunswick (Crawford)	0	0	0	3	0	1	0	2	0	1	7

== Tiebreakers ==
Thursday, February 20, 8:00 am

Sheet B	1	2	3	4	5	6	7	8	9	10	Final
Nova Scotia (Arsenault) 🔨	0	1	0	1	0	0	0	0	1	1	4
British Columbia (Brown)	1	0	1	0	1	0	1	1	0	0	5

Player percentages
Nova Scotia		British Columbia	
Emma Logan	88%	Ashley Klymchuk	90%
Jenn Baxter	75%	Dezaray Hawes	70%
Christina Black	61%	Erin Pincott	89%
Mary-Anne Arsenault	61%	Corryn Brown	66%
Total	71%	Total	79%

Sheet C	1	2	3	4	5	6	7	8	9	10	11	Final
Saskatchewan (Silvernagle) 🔨	2	1	0	2	0	0	0	2	0	0	2	9
New Brunswick (Crawford)	0	0	2	0	1	1	0	0	2	1	0	7

Player percentages
Saskatchewan		New Brunswick	
Kara Thevenot	82%	Katie Forward	90%
Jessie Hunkin	77%	Jillian Babin	64%
Stefanie Lawton	75%	Jennifer Armstrong	72%
Robyn Silvernagle	79%	Andrea Crawford	75%
Total	78%	Total	75%

== Championship pool standings ==
The top four teams from each pool advance to the championship pool. All wins and losses earned in the round robin will be carried forward into the championship Pool. Wins in tiebreaker games are not carried forward.

Final Championship Pool Standings

Key
Teams to Playoffs

Team	Skip	W	L	PF	PA	EW	EL	BE	SE	S%
Manitoba	Kerri Einarson	9	2	87	70	49	46	4	8	85%
(Manitoba) Wild Card	Jennifer Jones	9	2	99	68	51	43	3	15	80%
Ontario	Rachel Homan	9	2	96	63	51	42	5	13	84%
Northern Ontario	Krista McCarville	8	3	74	59	49	41	8	17	80%
Saskatchewan	Robyn Silvernagle	6	5	66	73	40	46	12	8	79%
British Columbia	Corryn Brown	5	6	81	75	46	46	7	11	81%
Canada	Chelsea Carey	5	6	60	74	48	44	5	12	81%
Prince Edward Island	Suzanne Birt	5	6	77	69	50	48	5	11	81%

== Championship pool results ==
=== Draw 16 ===
Thursday, February 20, 12:30 pm

Sheet A	1	2	3	4	5	6	7	8	9	10	Final
Saskatchewan (Silvernagle) 🔨	0	0	1	0	4	0	1	0	1	1	8
Prince Edward Island (Birt)	0	1	0	1	0	2	0	3	0	0	7

Sheet B	1	2	3	4	5	6	7	8	9	10	Final
Ontario (Homan) 🔨	2	0	2	1	0	3	1	0	X	X	9
Northern Ontario (McCarville)	0	1	0	0	2	0	0	1	X	X	4

Sheet C	1	2	3	4	5	6	7	8	9	10	Final
Manitoba (Einarson) 🔨	3	0	0	0	2	0	1	0	2	X	8
British Columbia (Brown)	0	1	0	1	0	1	0	1	0	X	4

Sheet D	1	2	3	4	5	6	7	8	9	10	Final
(Manitoba) Wild Card (Jones)	4	1	3	0	1	1	0	0	X	X	10
Canada (Carey) 🔨	0	0	0	2	0	0	2	1	X	X	5

=== Draw 17 ===
Thursday, February 20, 6:30 pm

Sheet A	1	2	3	4	5	6	7	8	9	10	Final
Canada (Carey)	0	2	0	1	0	1	0	0	0	X	4
Ontario (Homan) 🔨	0	0	2	0	3	0	0	2	1	X	8

Sheet B	1	2	3	4	5	6	7	8	9	10	Final
Prince Edward Island (Birt)	0	1	0	1	0	1	0	1	0	X	4
Manitoba (Einarson) 🔨	3	0	1	0	2	0	1	0	2	X	9

Sheet C	1	2	3	4	5	6	7	8	9	10	Final
(Manitoba) Wild Card (Jones)	0	1	0	0	2	0	3	2	X	X	8
Saskatchewan (Silvernagle) 🔨	0	0	1	0	0	2	0	0	X	X	3

Sheet D	1	2	3	4	5	6	7	8	9	10	11	Final
Northern Ontario (McCarville)	0	2	0	1	0	0	1	0	2	0	1	7
British Columbia (Brown) 🔨	0	0	2	0	0	1	0	1	0	2	0	6

=== Draw 18 ===
Friday, February 21, 12:30 pm

Sheet A	1	2	3	4	5	6	7	8	9	10	Final
Manitoba (Einarson)	0	2	0	1	0	2	0	2	X	X	7
(Manitoba) Wild Card (Jones) 🔨	4	0	4	0	1	0	3	0	X	X	12

Sheet B	1	2	3	4	5	6	7	8	9	10	Final
British Columbia (Brown) 🔨	0	2	0	2	0	0	1	4	X	X	9
Canada (Carey)	0	0	2	0	0	0	0	0	X	X	2

Sheet C	1	2	3	4	5	6	7	8	9	10	Final
Prince Edward Island (Birt) 🔨	0	0	0	1	0	1	0	1	0	2	5
Northern Ontario (McCarville)	0	0	1	0	2	0	1	0	2	0	6

Sheet D	1	2	3	4	5	6	7	8	9	10	Final
Saskatchewan (Silvernagle) 🔨	1	0	0	0	0	1	0	2	X	X	4
Ontario (Homan)	0	2	3	1	1	0	2	0	X	X	9

=== Draw 19 ===
Friday, February 21, 6:30 pm

Sheet A	1	2	3	4	5	6	7	8	9	10	Final
British Columbia (Brown)	0	0	1	1	0	0	3	0	1	0	6
Saskatchewan (Silvernagle) 🔨	0	3	0	0	0	2	0	1	0	1	7

Sheet B	1	2	3	4	5	6	7	8	9	10	Final
Northern Ontario (McCarville)	2	0	2	1	2	0	3	0	1	X	11
(Manitoba) Wild Card (Jones) 🔨	0	2	0	0	0	3	0	1	0	X	6

Sheet C	1	2	3	4	5	6	7	8	9	10	Final
Ontario (Homan)	0	2	0	1	0	2	0	0	1	0	6
Manitoba (Einarson) 🔨	3	0	3	0	1	0	0	1	0	1	9

Sheet D	1	2	3	4	5	6	7	8	9	10	Final
Canada (Carey) 🔨	1	0	1	0	0	1	0	1	0	1	5
Prince Edward Island (Birt)	0	1	0	1	0	0	0	0	1	0	3

== Playoffs ==
Page playoff system
1	Manitoba	6
2	(Manitoba) Wild Card	4
3	Ontario	9
4	Northern Ontario	5

Semifinal
2	(Manitoba) Wild Card	3
3	Ontario	8

Final
1	Manitoba	8
3	Ontario	7

=== 1 vs. 2 ===
Saturday, February 22, 6:00 pm

Sheet C	1	2	3	4	5	6	7	8	9	10	Final
Manitoba (Einarson)	0	0	0	1	0	2	0	2	0	1	6
(Manitoba) Wild Card (Jones) 🔨	0	1	0	0	1	0	1	0	1	0	4

Player percentages
Manitoba		(Manitoba) Wild Card	
Briane Meilleur	96%	Dawn McEwen	91%
Shannon Birchard	71%	Jocelyn Peterman	80%
Val Sweeting	76%	Kaitlyn Lawes	84%
Kerri Einarson	94%	Jennifer Jones	81%
Total	84%	Total	84%

=== 3 vs. 4 ===
Saturday, February 22, 1:00 pm

Sheet C	1	2	3	4	5	6	7	8	9	10	Final
Ontario (Homan) 🔨	0	1	0	0	1	0	2	0	3	2	9
Northern Ontario (McCarville)	0	0	1	1	0	2	0	1	0	0	5

Player percentages
Ontario		Northern Ontario	
Lisa Weagle	88%	Jen Gates	88%
Joanne Courtney	71%	Ashley Sippala	76%
Emma Miskew	91%	Kendra Lilly	76%
Rachel Homan	76%	Krista McCarville	78%
Total	82%	Total	79%

=== Semifinal ===
Sunday, February 23, 11:00 am

Sheet C	1	2	3	4	5	6	7	8	9	10	Final
(Manitoba) Wild Card (Jones) 🔨	0	0	0	1	0	1	0	1	0	X	3
Ontario (Homan)	0	3	0	0	2	0	1	0	2	X	8

Player percentages
(Manitoba) Wild Card		Ontario	
Dawn McEwen	97%	Lisa Weagle	90%
Jocelyn Peterman	71%	Joanne Courtney	82%
Kaitlyn Lawes	76%	Emma Miskew	94%
Jennifer Jones	71%	Rachel Homan	93%
Total	79%	Total	90%

=== Final ===
Sunday, February 23, 6:00 pm

Sheet C	1	2	3	4	5	6	7	8	9	10	11	Final
Manitoba (Einarson) 🔨	1	1	0	2	0	2	0	1	0	0	1	8
Ontario (Homan)	0	0	1	0	1	0	1	0	2	2	0	7

Player percentages
Manitoba		Ontario	
Briane Meilleur	93%	Lisa Weagle	90%
Shannon Birchard	93%	Joanne Courtney	84%
Val Sweeting	83%	Emma Miskew	91%
Kerri Einarson	82%	Rachel Homan	84%
Total	88%	Total	87%

== Statistics ==
=== Top 5 player percentages ===
After Championship Pool; minimum 5 games

Key
First All-Star Team
Second All-Star Team

Leads	%
(British Columbia) Ashley Klymchuk	90
(Alberta) Nadine Scotland	89
(Canada) Rachelle Brown	89
(New Brunswick) Katie Forward	88
(Ontario) Lisa Weagle	86

Seconds	%
(Manitoba) Shannon Birchard	85
(Ontario) Joanne Courtney	83
(British Columbia) Dezaray Hawes	81
(Canada) Dana Ferguson	81
(Northern Ontario) Ashley Sippala	80

Thirds	%
(Manitoba) Val Sweeting	84
(Ontario) Emma Miskew	82
(Canada) Sarah Wilkes	82
WC Kaitlyn Lawes	80
(British Columbia) Erin Pincott	80

Skips	%
(Ontario) Rachel Homan	85
(Manitoba) Kerri Einarson	85
(Alberta) Laura Walker	82
(Prince Edward Island) Suzanne Birt	80
(Northern Ontario) Krista McCarville	78

=== Perfect games ===
Player	Team	Position	Shots	Opponent
Krista McCarville	Northern Ontario	Skip	20	Alberta

== Awards ==
The awards and all-star teams were as follows:

All-Star Teams

First Team

- Skip: Rachel Homan, Ontario
- Third: Val Sweeting, Manitoba
- Second: Shannon Birchard, Manitoba
- Lead: Lisa Weagle, Ontario

Second Team

- Skip: Kerri Einarson, Manitoba
- Third: Emma Miskew, Ontario
- Second: Joanne Courtney, Ontario
- Lead: Rachelle Brown, Team Canada

Marj Mitchell Sportsmanship Award

- Rachelle Brown, Team Canada

Joan Mead Builder Award

- Deanna Rindal, long-time curling umpire based in the Prince Albert area.

== Final standings ==
Team	Rank
Manitoba	1st place, gold medalist(s)
Ontario	2nd place, silver medalist(s)
(Manitoba) Wild Card	3rd place, bronze medalist(s)
Northern Ontario	4
Saskatchewan	5
British Columbia	6
Canada	7
Prince Edward Island	8
New Brunswick	T–9
Nova Scotia	T–9
Alberta	11
Northwest Territories	T–12
Nunavut	T–12
Newfoundland and Labrador	14
Quebec	T–15
Yukon	T–15

== Provincial and territorial playdowns ==
- 2020 Alberta Scotties Tournament of Hearts
- 2020 British Columbia Scotties Tournament of Hearts
- 2020 Manitoba Scotties Tournament of Hearts
- 2020 New Brunswick Scotties Tournament of Hearts
- 2020 Newfoundland and Labrador Scotties Tournament of Hearts
- 2020 Northern Ontario Scotties Tournament of Hearts
- 2020 Nova Scotia Scotties Tournament of Hearts
- 2020 Ontario Scotties Tournament of Hearts
- 2020 Prince Edward Island Scotties Tournament of Hearts
- 2020 Quebec Scotties Tournament of Hearts
- 2020 Saskatchewan Scotties Tournament of Hearts
- 2020 Northwest Territories Scotties Tournament of Hearts
- 2020 Yukon Scotties Tournament of Hearts
- 2020 Nunavut Scotties Tournament of Hearts
