= Corryn Brown =

Canadian curler (born 1995)

- Curler
- Born: Corryn Brown; July 19, 1995 (age 31); Kamloops, British Columbia

Team
- Curling club: Kamloops CC, Kamloops, BC
- Mixed doubles partner: Matt Whiteford

Curling career
- Member Association: British Columbia
- Hearts: 4 (2020, 2021, 2024, 2025)
- World Junior Curling Championship: 1 (2013)
- Top CTRS ranking: 6th (2024–25)
Medal record
Women's Curling
Representing British Columbia
Canada Winter Games
| Gold medal – first place | 2011 Halifax |
Representing Canada
Winter Youth Olympic Games
| Bronze medal – third place | 2012 Innsbruck |

Corryn Cecile Brown (born July 19, 1995) is a Canadian curler from British Columbia.

== Career ==
She was the skip of the winning team at the 2013 Canadian Junior Curling Championships, and represented Canada at the 2013 World Junior Curling Championships, where she placed 9th. Brown also represented Canada at the 2012 Winter Youth Olympics where she won a bronze medal. She also won a gold medal at the 2011 Canada Winter Games. Brown and her team competed once again at the 2015 Canadian Junior Curling Championships in Corner Brook, Newfoundland and Labrador, where they won the bronze medal after losing to Ontario in the semi-finals 9–4. In her last year of junior eligibility, Brown claimed the BC Junior Title and represented BC at the 2017 Canadian Junior Curling Championships in Victoria BC. Brown finished with a 5–5 record, failing to make the playoffs. On the World Curling Tour, Brown has won the 2014 Coronation Business Group Classic, the 2016 Qinghai China Women's International, the 2018 King Cash Spiel and the 2018 Sunset Ranch Kelowna Double Cash.

In their first event of the 2019–20 season, they missed the playoffs at the Booster Juice Shoot-Out. They then missed the playoffs at the 2019 Colonial Square Ladies Classic. They then made the playoffs at six straight events starting with the Prestige Hotels & Resorts Curling Classic where they made it to the quarterfinals. The following week, they won the Driving Force Decks Int'l Abbotsford Cashspiel and two weeks after that they won the Kamloops Crown of Curling. Their next event was the Tour Challenge Tier 2 where they lost to Jestyn Murphy in the semifinal. They also made the semifinal at the Red Deer Curling Classic. They lost the final of the 2019 China Open in mid-December, their last event of 2019. Brown won her first provincial title at the 2020 British Columbia Scotties Tournament of Hearts when they stole in the extra end to defeat defending champions Sarah Wark. At the 2020 Scotties Tournament of Hearts, Team BC finished with a 5–6 record and they finished in sixth place. After the season, Ashley Klymchuk left the team due to her pregnancy and was replaced by Samantha Fisher who previously played on the team before deciding to focus on her studies. Erin Pincott and Dezaray Hawes continued at third and second respectively.

Team Brown began the 2020–21 curling season by winning the 2020 Sunset Ranch Kelowna Double Cash. Due to the COVID-19 pandemic in British Columbia, the 2021 provincial championship was cancelled. As the reigning provincial champions, Team Brown was invited to represent British Columbia at the 2021 Scotties Tournament of Hearts, which they accepted. At the Hearts, Brown led her team to a 4–4 round robin record, failing to qualify for the championship round.

To begin the 2021–22 season, the Brown rink won the Alberta Curling Series: Leduc event. They then played in the 2021 Alberta Curling Series: Saville Shoot-Out where they went undefeated until the semifinals where they were defeated by Laura Walker. Due to the pandemic, the qualification process for the 2021 Canadian Olympic Curling Trials had to be modified to qualify enough teams for the championship. In these modifications, Curling Canada created the 2021 Canadian Curling Trials Direct-Entry Event, an event where five teams would compete to try to earn one of three spots into the 2021 Canadian Olympic Curling Trials. Team Brown qualified for the Trials Direct-Entry Event due to their CTRS ranking from the 2019–20 season. At the event, the team went 1–3 through the round robin, qualifying for the tiebreaker round where they faced Alberta's Walker rink. After winning the first game, Team Brown lost the second and final tiebreaker, not earning direct qualification into the Trials. The team had one final chance to advance to the Olympic Trials through the 2021 Canadian Olympic Curling Pre-Trials where they finished the round-robin with a 4–2 record. This qualified them for the double knockout round, where they beat both Mackenzie Zacharias and Sherry Anderson to advance to the final qualifier. There, they lost 9–2 to Jacqueline Harrison, ending their chances of reaching the Olympic Trials. Back on tour, the team played in their first Grand Slam of Curling event, the 2021 National, which they qualified for due to their successful results throughout the season. They finished 2–3 through the triple knockout event, just missing the playoffs. At the 2022 British Columbia Scotties Tournament of Hearts, Team Brown entered as the number one seeds, however, lost two qualifying games against Kayla MacMillan and Diane Gushulak, qualifying through the C side. They then lost the 3 vs. 4 game to Sarah Wark, eliminating them from provincials. They finished their season at the inaugural Best of the West championship where they won the title.

Team Brown struggled at the beginning of the 2022–23 season, failing to qualify for the playoffs in their first three events. They turned thing around at the Prestige Hotels & Resorts Curling Classic, losing just one game en route to capturing the event title. Later that month, they won their second title at the Kamloops Crown of Curling. Despite only entering the playoffs in two of their eight tour events, Team Brown found immediate success at the 2023 British Columbia Scotties Tournament of Hearts, defeating the number one ranked Clancy Grandy rink in both the A qualifier and the 1 vs. 2 page playoff. In the final, again facing Grandy, they fell 10–9 in an extra end, failing to qualify for the 2023 Scotties Tournament of Hearts which was held in their home city of Kamloops. At the end of the season, the team again won the Best of the West championship, defeating Manitoba's Kelsey Rocque 6–1 in the final. In March 2023, the team announced they would be parting ways with second Dezaray Hawes. They later announced Jennifer Armstrong would join them as their new second for the 2023–24 season.

== Personal life ==
Brown attended Thompson Rivers University and works a governance and strategy analyst for the Ministry of Education and Childcare. She is married to Matt Whiteford and has one son.

== Grand Slam record ==
Key
| C | Champion |
| F | Lost in Final |
| SF | Lost in Semifinal |
| QF | Lost in Quarterfinals |
| R16 | Lost in the round of 16 |
| Q | Did not advance to playoffs |
| T2 | Played in Tier 2 event |
| DNP | Did not participate in event |
| N/A | Not a Grand Slam event that season |

| Event | 2021–22 | 2022–23 | 2023–24 | 2024–25 | 2025–26 |
|---|---|---|---|---|---|
| Masters | DNP | DNP | DNP | DNP | T2 |
| Tour Challenge | N/A | DNP | DNP | T2 | DNP |
| The National | Q | DNP | DNP | DNP | DNP |
| Canadian Open | N/A | DNP | DNP | DNP | T2 |
