= Lindsay Hudyma =

Canadian curler

Lindsay Hudyma (born August 20, 1986 in Regina, Saskatchewan) is a Canadian curler from Vancouver, British Columbia. She currently skips a team on the World Curling Tour.

As a junior curler in Calgary, Hudyma competed in three (2004, 2005 and 2008) Alberta provincial junior curling championships, with her best finish coming in 2008 when her team (skipped by Maria Bushell) finished third.

Hudyma later moved to Vancouver and joined the Amy Gibson rink, throwing fourth stones on the team. Hudyma played in her first provincial championship, the 2016 British Columbia Scotties Tournament of Hearts, where the team finished tied for 5th place. In 2016, she left the Gibson team to form her own rink with Steph Jackson-Baier, Holly Donaldson and Carley St. Blaze. In their first event, the team lost in the finals of the Cloverdale Cash Spiel.

== Personal life ==
Hudyma attended Queen Elizabeth High School, Mount Royal University and Kwantlen Polytechnic University. She works as a designer for Lululemon Athletica. She is married.
