= Karla Thompson =

Canadian curler from British Columbia

- Curler
- Born: 1984 (age 41–42); Langley, British Columbia, Canada

Curling career
- Member Association: British Columbia
- Hearts: 2 (2008, 2016)

Karla Thompson (born Karla Sparkes in 1984) is a Canadian curler from Kamloops, British Columbia. She skipped the team that won the 2016 British Columbia Scotties Tournament of Hearts and represented the province at the national Scotties Tournament of Hearts in Grande Prairie, Alberta. Thompson has also competed in multiple provincial championships and the Canadian Olympic Curling Trials.

== Early life ==
Thompson was born in Langley, British Columbia. She attended Brookswood Secondary School and later studied at Thompson Rivers University. Outside of curling, she works as a teacher in School District 73 in Kamloops.

== Curling career ==
Thompson began competing in provincial-level curling in the early 2000s. She made her first national appearance at the 2008 Scotties Tournament of Hearts, playing third for Team British Columbia, finishing with a 4–7 record.

In 2016, Thompson skipped her team to victory at the British Columbia Scotties Tournament of Hearts held in Coquitlam. Her team included third Kristen Recksiedler, second Tracey Lavery, and lead Trysta Vandale. Following her provincial win, Thompson represented British Columbia at the 2016 Scotties Tournament of Hearts in Grande Prairie, Alberta. The team finished with a 2–9 record in the main draw after winning the pre-qualifying final against Kerry Galusha of the Northwest Territories.

Thompson was invited to the 2017 Road to the Roar Pre-Trials, which determined entries for the Canadian Olympic Curling Trials.

== Career statistics ==
Year	Team	Position	Event	Finish	Record	Pct.
2008	B.C. (MacInnes)	Third	2008 STOH	9th	4–7	72
2016	B.C. (Thompson)	Skip	2016 STOH	11th	2–9	67
2017	Thompson	Skip	Olympic Pre-Q	DNQ	1–5	73
Scotties Tournament of Hearts Totals					6–16	69
