= 2010 British Columbia Scotties Tournament of Hearts =

- Host city: Penticton, British Columbia
- Arena: Penticton Curling Club
- Dates: January 4–10
- Winner: Team Scott
- Curling club: Kelowna CC, Kelowna
- Skip: Kelly Scott
- Third: Jeanna Schraeder
- Second: Sasha Carter
- Lead: Jacquie Armstrong
- Finalist: Kelley Law

The 2010 British Columbia Scotties Tournament of Hearts, the provincial women's curling championship for British Columbia, was held January 4 to 10 at the Penticton Curling Club in Penticton. The winning Kelly Scott rink represented British Columbia at the 2010 Scotties Tournament of Hearts in Sault Ste. Marie, Ontario.

The round robin returned to ten teams for the first time since 2002. The playoff format was changed from a three-team playoff to a four-team page playoff.

== Teams ==
Skip	Third	Second	Lead	Club(s)
Jerry-Pat Armstrong-Smith	Tracey Amy	Susan Hicks	Lynn Lee	Cranbrook CC, Cranbrook
Nicole Backe	Gloria Palinkas	Shannon Gallaugher	Barbara Zbeetnoff	Nanaimo CC, Nanaimo
Kristen Fewster	Jennifer Fewster	Blaine Richards	Amber Cheveldale	Prince George CC, Prince George
Kelley Law	Jody Maskiewich	Shannon Aleksic	Darah Provencal	Royal City CC, New Westminster
Kristy Lewis	Marilou Richter	Michelle Ramsay	Sandra Comadina	Richmond CC, Richmond
Marla Mallett	Grace MacInnes	Diane Gushulak	Jacalyn Brown	Royal City CC, New Westminster
Lori Olsen	Tiffany Krausher	Christine Miller	Karla Crellin	McArthur Island CC, Kamloops
Kelly Scott	Jeanna Schraeder	Sasha Carter	Jacquie Armstrong	Kelowna CC, Kelowna
Adina Tasaka	Susan Allen	Heather Beatty	Jenn Armstrong	Royal City CC, New Westminster
Karla Thompson	Sandra Jenkins	Bridget Tansem	Lanette Nordick	Kamloops CC, Kamloops

== Round robin standings ==
Final Round Robin standings

Key
Teams to Playoffs

Skip	W	L	W–L	PF	PA	EW	EL	BE	SE
Kelly Scott	8	1	1–0	72	51	43	38	11	9
Kelley Law	8	1	0–1	74	46	45	35	17	14
Kristen Fewster	6	3	–	53	42	36	30	17	11
Marla Mallett	5	4	–	53	46	34	32	23	10
Jerry-Pat Armstrong-Smith	4	5	1–0	45	45	28	33	29	5
Nicole Backe	4	5	0–1	55	62	37	37	5	9
Adina Tasaka	3	6	1–0	46	60	34	34	13	8
Kristy Lewis	3	6	0–1	56	46	30	37	11	8
Karla Thompson	2	7	1–0	31	57	29	35	14	6
Lori Olsen	2	7	0–1	44	68	29	37	14	3

== Round robin results ==
All draw times listed in Pacific Time (UTC−08:00).

=== Draw 1 ===
Monday, January 4, 12:00 pm

Sheet A	1	2	3	4	5	6	7	8	9	10	Final
Marla Mallett	0	1	0	1	0	0	2	0	0	0	4
Karla Thompson	0	0	1	0	1	1	0	0	2	2	7

Sheet B	1	2	3	4	5	6	7	8	9	10	Final
Adina Tasaka	0	0	1	0	2	0	1	0	1	0	5
Lori Olsen	0	1	0	1	0	1	0	3	0	2	8

Sheet C	1	2	3	4	5	6	7	8	9	10	Final
Kristy Lewis	1	0	0	0	0	0	1	1	0	X	3
Kristen Fewster	0	2	0	3	1	1	0	0	1	X	8

Sheet D	1	2	3	4	5	6	7	8	9	10	11	Final
Kelley Law	0	1	0	0	2	0	0	0	0	1	3	7
Jerry-Pat Armstrong-Smith	0	0	0	2	0	2	0	0	0	0	0	4

Sheet E	1	2	3	4	5	6	7	8	9	10	Final
Nicole Backe	0	0	1	0	2	0	0	0	0	X	3
Kelly Scott	2	1	0	2	0	0	2	0	3	X	10

=== Draw 2 ===
Monday, January 4, 7:30 pm

Sheet A	1	2	3	4	5	6	7	8	9	10	Final
Kelley Law	0	0	2	0	2	0	2	0	2	3	11
Adina Tasaka	2	1	0	1	0	1	0	2	0	0	7

Sheet B	1	2	3	4	5	6	7	8	9	10	Final
Marla Mallett	0	2	1	0	0	1	0	0	0	2	6
Kristen Fewster	1	0	0	0	1	0	0	1	0	0	3

Sheet C	1	2	3	4	5	6	7	8	9	10	Final
Karla Thompson	0	0	2	1	0	0	0	1	0	X	4
Nicole Backe	1	0	0	0	3	0	2	0	1	X	7

Sheet D	1	2	3	4	5	6	7	8	9	10	Final
Kristy Lewis	0	1	1	0	2	0	1	0	2	X	7
Kelly Scott	0	0	0	1	0	1	0	1	0	X	3

Sheet E	1	2	3	4	5	6	7	8	9	10	Final
Jerry-Pat Armstrong-Smith	0	3	0	0	2	0	2	0	0	3	10
Lori Olsen	2	0	0	1	0	1	0	3	0	0	7

=== Draw 3 ===
Tuesday, January 5, 12:00 pm

Sheet A	1	2	3	4	5	6	7	8	9	10	Final
Lori Olsen	0	0	0	1	0	X	X	X	X	X	1
Kristy Lewis	3	2	2	0	2	X	X	X	X	X	9

Sheet B	1	2	3	4	5	6	7	8	9	10	Final
Nicole Backe	1	0	1	0	0	2	0	0	0	X	4
Jerry-Pat Armstrong-Smith	0	2	0	1	0	0	0	1	1	X	5

Sheet C	1	2	3	4	5	6	7	8	9	10	Final
Kelly Scott	0	2	0	2	0	0	0	2	0	2	8
Marla Mallett	1	0	2	0	0	1	0	0	2	0	6

Sheet D	1	2	3	4	5	6	7	8	9	10	Final
Adina Tasaka	0	0	2	0	1	1	2	3	X	X	9
Karla Thompson	0	1	0	1	0	0	0	0	X	X	2

Sheet E	1	2	3	4	5	6	7	8	9	10	Final
Kristen Fewster	0	0	1	0	1	0	0	1	X	X	3
Kelley Law	1	1	0	2	0	1	3	0	X	X	8

=== Draw 4 ===
Wednesday, January 5, 7:00 pm

Sheet A	1	2	3	4	5	6	7	8	9	10	Final
Nicole Backe	1	0	0	2	0	0	0	1	0	X	4
Marla Mallett	0	2	1	0	0	0	2	0	2	X	7

Sheet B	1	2	3	4	5	6	7	8	9	10	Final
Kristy Lewis	0	0	0	0	2	0	2	0	0	X	4
Adina Tasaka	0	1	1	0	0	2	0	0	2	X	6

Sheet C	1	2	3	4	5	6	7	8	9	10	Final
Lori Olsen	0	0	0	0	0	1	1	0	0	X	2
Kelley Law	1	0	0	2	0	0	0	1	1	X	5

Sheet D	1	2	3	4	5	6	7	8	9	10	Final
Jerry-Pat Armstrong-Smith	0	0	0	0	0	1	0	0	1	0	2
Kristen Fewster	0	0	0	2	0	0	1	1	0	0	4

Sheet E	1	2	3	4	5	6	7	8	9	10	Final
Kelly Scott	1	0	0	3	0	2	0	2	0	1	9
Karla Thompson	0	1	1	0	1	0	1	0	1	0	5

=== Draw 5 ===
Wednesday, January 6, 12:00 pm

Sheet A	1	2	3	4	5	6	7	8	9	10	11	Final
Kelly Scott	0	1	0	3	0	1	1	0	0	1	2	9
Kelley Law	1	0	2	0	1	0	0	2	1	0	0	7

Sheet B	1	2	3	4	5	6	7	8	9	10	Final
Kristen Fewster	0	5	1	0	0	0	0	1	0	X	7
Karla Thompson	1	0	0	1	0	1	1	0	0	X	4

Sheet C	1	2	3	4	5	6	7	8	9	10	Final
Adina Tasaka	0	0	1	0	1	0	1	0	0	X	3
Jerry-Pat Armstrong-Smith	0	1	0	0	0	4	0	1	0	X	6

Sheet D	1	2	3	4	5	6	7	8	9	10	11	Final
Lori Olsen	1	0	0	0	2	0	1	0	1	0	2	7
Marla Mallett	0	0	0	4	0	0	0	0	0	1	0	5

Sheet E	1	2	3	4	5	6	7	8	9	10	11	Final
Kristy Lewis	3	0	1	0	0	0	0	3	0	0	0	7
Nicole Backe	0	1	0	1	1	1	1	0	1	1	1	8

=== Draw 6 ===
Wednesday, January 6, 7:00 pm

Sheet A	1	2	3	4	5	6	7	8	9	10	Final
Kristy Lewis	0	0	1	2	0	0	1	1	0	0	5
Jerry-Pat Armstrong-Smith	0	1	0	0	0	3	0	0	1	1	6

Sheet B	1	2	3	4	5	6	7	8	9	10	Final
Lori Olsen	0	0	0	0	0	1	1	0	X	X	2
Kelly Scott	2	2	0	1	0	0	0	2	X	X	7

Sheet C	1	2	3	4	5	6	7	8	9	10	Final
Kelley Law	0	0	1	0	4	0	0	2	1	X	8
Karla Thompson	0	1	0	1	0	0	1	0	0	X	3

Sheet D	1	2	3	4	5	6	7	8	9	10	11	Final
Kristen Fewster	1	0	1	0	0	0	1	1	0	1	1	6
Nicole Backe	0	0	0	0	2	2	0	0	1	0	0	5

Sheet E	1	2	3	4	5	6	7	8	9	10	Final
Marla Mallett	0	3	0	0	3	1	0	2	X	X	9
Adina Tasaka	0	0	1	1	0	0	2	0	X	X	4

=== Draw 7 ===
Thursday, January 7, 12:00 pm

Sheet A	1	2	3	4	5	6	7	8	9	10	Final
Kristen Fewster	1	0	1	0	2	0	3	0	1	X	8
Lori Olsen	0	0	0	1	0	3	0	0	0	X	4

Sheet B	1	2	3	4	5	6	7	8	9	10	Final
Kelley Law	0	2	0	2	0	1	0	2	0	0	7
Nicole Backe	0	0	2	0	1	0	0	0	2	1	6

Sheet C	1	2	3	4	5	6	7	8	9	10	Final
Marla Mallett	0	0	1	0	1	1	2	2	0	X	7
Kristy Lewis	0	0	0	3	0	0	0	0	1	X	4

Sheet D	1	2	3	4	5	6	7	8	9	10	Final
Kelly Scott	0	0	1	0	2	1	4	X	X	X	8
Adina Tasaka	0	1	0	1	0	0	0	X	X	X	2

Sheet E	1	2	3	4	5	6	7	8	9	10	Final
Karla Thompson	0	0	0	1	0	0	0	0	0	0	1
Jerry-Pat Armstrong-Smith	0	1	0	0	0	0	0	1	0	2	4

=== Draw 8 ===
Thursday, January 7, 7:00 pm

Sheet A	1	2	3	4	5	6	7	8	9	10	Final
Adina Tasaka	2	0	1	0	0	1	0	2	0	1	7
Nicole Backe	0	1	0	1	0	0	1	0	1	0	4

Sheet B	1	2	3	4	5	6	7	8	9	10	11	Final
Jerry-Pat Armstrong-Smith	0	0	0	1	0	0	0	0	2	1	0	4
Marla Mallett	0	0	0	0	0	1	2	1	0	0	1	5

Sheet C	1	2	3	4	5	6	7	8	9	10	Final
Kristen Fewster	0	0	0	2	0	1	0	0	3	0	6
Kelly Scott	1	0	0	0	2	0	0	1	0	4	8

Sheet D	1	2	3	4	5	6	7	8	9	10	Final
Karla Thompson	0	0	1	0	4	1	0	1	0	X	7
Lori Olsen	0	1	0	1	0	0	1	0	1	X	4

Sheet E	1	2	3	4	5	6	7	8	9	10	Final
Kelley Law	1	0	1	0	0	3	0	0	1	1	7
Kristy Lewis	0	2	0	2	0	0	1	0	0	0	5

=== Draw 9 ===
Friday, January 8, 9:30 am

Sheet A	1	2	3	4	5	6	7	8	9	10	Final
Jerry-Pat Armstrong-Smith	1	0	2	0	0	0	0	1	0	X	4
Kelly Scott	0	1	0	2	1	0	1	0	2	X	7

Sheet B	1	2	3	4	5	6	7	8	9	10	Final
Karla Thompson	2	0	1	0	0	0	X	X	X	X	3
Kristy Lewis	0	2	0	4	1	2	X	X	X	X	9

Sheet C	1	2	3	4	5	6	7	8	9	10	Final
Nicole Backe	5	1	3	0	0	0	1	0	2	X	12
Lori Olsen	0	0	0	3	1	3	0	2	0	X	9

Sheet D	1	2	3	4	5	6	7	8	9	10	11	Final
Marla Mallett	0	0	1	0	0	0	1	1	0	1	0	4
Kelley Law	0	0	0	2	0	1	0	0	1	0	1	5

Sheet E	1	2	3	4	5	6	7	8	9	10	Final
Adina Tasaka	0	0	1	0	1	0	0	1	0	0	3
Kristen Fewster	0	0	0	1	0	2	3	0	1	1	8

== Playoffs ==
Page playoff system
1	Kelly Scott	3
2	Kelley Law	9
3	Kristen Fewster	3
4	Marla Mallett	7

Semifinal
1	Kelly Scott	6
4	Marla Mallett	5

Final
2	Kelley Law	4
1	Kelly Scott	8

=== 1 vs. 2 ===
Friday, January 8, 7:00 pm

Team	1	2	3	4	5	6	7	8	9	10	Final
Kelley Law	1	0	2	2	3	0	0	1	X	X	9
Scott	0	1	0	0	0	1	1	0	X	X	3

=== 3 vs. 4 ===
Saturday, January 9, 9:30 am

Team	1	2	3	4	5	6	7	8	9	10	Final
Kristen Fewster	0	2	0	0	0	1	0	0	0	X	3
Marla Mallett	0	0	3	0	0	0	2	1	1	X	7

=== Semifinal ===
Saturday, January 9, 5:00 pm

Team	1	2	3	4	5	6	7	8	9	10	Final
Kelly Scott	0	0	2	0	2	0	0	2	0	X	6
Marla Mallett	1	0	0	1	0	0	2	0	1	X	5

=== Final ===
Sunday, January 10, 2:00 pm

Team	1	2	3	4	5	6	7	8	9	10	Final
Kelley Law	0	2	0	0	0	1	1	0	0	X	4
Kelly Scott	0	0	3	2	1	0	0	1	1	X	8

2010 British Columbia Scott Tournament of Hearts

Kelly Scott
3rd British Columbia Provincial Championship title
