= 2012 British Columbia Scotties Tournament of Hearts =

- Host city: North Vancouver, British Columbia
- Arena: North Shore Winter Club
- Dates: January 23–29, 2012
- Winner: Team Scott
- Curling club: Kelowna CC, Kelowna
- Skip: Kelly Scott
- Third: Sasha Carter
- Second: Dailene Sivertson
- Lead: Jacquie Armstrong
- Finalist: Marla Mallett

The 2012 British Columbia Scotties Tournament of Hearts presented by Best Western, British Columbia's women's provincial curling championship, was held from January 23 to 29 at the North Shore Winter Club in North Vancouver, British Columbia. The winning team of Kelly Scott represented British Columbia at the 2012 Scotties Tournament of Hearts in Red Deer, Alberta where they finished round robin with an 8-3 record, which was enough to finish 2nd place and clinch a spot in the playoffs. They would win the 1-2 game advance to the final, where they would lose to Alberta.

== Qualification process ==
Ten teams qualified for the provincial tournament through several berths. The qualification process was as follows:

| Teams | Qualification method | Berths | Qualifying team |
|---|---|---|---|
| Team 1 | Defending Champion from 2011 B.C Scotties | 1 | Kelly Scott |
| Team 2 | CTRS points leader from December 1, 2010 to December 1, 2011 | 1 | Kelley Law |
| Teams 3 & 4 | Open Qualification Round 1 | 2 | Allison MacInnes; Kelly Thompson |
| Teams 5 & 6 | Open Qualification Round 2 | 2 | Roselyn Craig; Nicole Backe |
| Teams 7 & 8 | Open Qualification Round 3 | 2 | Jen Rusnell; Brenda Garvey |
| Teams 9 & 10 | Open Qualification Round 4 | 2 | Marilou Richter; Marla Mallett |

== Teams ==
| Skip | Third | Second | Lead | Club(s) |
|---|---|---|---|---|
| Nicole Backe | Rachelle Kallechy | Lindsae Page | Kelsi Jones | Royal City Curling Club, New Westminster |
| Sarah Wark (fourth) | Michelle Allen | Simone Brosseau | Roselyn Craig (skip) | Victoria Curling Club, Victoria |
| Patti Knezevic (fourth) | Brenda Garvey (skip) | Chelan Cotter | Rhonda Camozzi | Kamloops Curling Club, Kamloops |
| Kelley Law | Shannon Aleksic | Kirsten Fox | Dawn Suliak | Royal City Curling Club, New Westminster |
| Allison MacInnes | Grace MacInnes | Diane Gushulak | Amanda Guido | Kamloops Curling Club, Kamloops |
| Marla Mallett | Kelly Shimizu | Danielle Callens | Barbara Zbeetnoff | Royal City Curling Club, New Westminster |
| Marilou Richter | Darah Provencal | Michelle Ramsay | Sandra Comadina | Richmond Curling Club, Richmond |
| Jen Rusnell | Kristen Fewster | Blaine Richards | Amber Cheveldave | Prince George Curling Club, Prince George |
| Kelly Scott | Sasha Carter | Dailene Sivertson | Jacquie Armstrong | Kelowna Curling Club, Kelowna |
| Kelly Thompson | Kimberly Thompson | Pamela Lai | Janelle Sakamoto | Richmond Curling Club, Richmond |

== Standings ==
| Skip (Club) | W | L | PF | PA | Ends Won | Ends Lost | Blank Ends | Stolen Ends |
|---|---|---|---|---|---|---|---|---|
| Kelly Scott (Kelowna) | 7 | 2 | 61 | 46 | 41 | 38 | 8 | 9 |
| Marla Mallett (Royal City) | 6 | 3 | 66 | 55 | 41 | 33 | 10 | 10 |
| Roselyn Craig (Victoria) | 6 | 3 | 63 | 49 | 37 | 37 | 11 | 9 |
| Kelley Law (Royal City) | 5 | 4 | 65 | 57 | 38 | 48 | 13 | 9 |
| Jen Rusnell (Prince George) | 5 | 4 | 44 | 51 | 34 | 23 | 20 | 8 |
| Nicole Backe (Royal City) | 5 | 4 | 59 | 49 | 40 | 31 | 14 | 11 |
| Marilou Richter (Richmond) | 5 | 4 | 66 | 62 | 41 | 36 | 11 | 10 |
| Allison MacInnes (Kamloops) | 4 | 5 | 54 | 61 | 37 | 38 | 13 | 6 |
| Kelly Thompson (Richmond) | 2 | 7 | 48 | 58 | 30 | 39 | 14 | 6 |
| Brenda Garvey (Kamloops) | 0 | 9 | 37 | 67 | 30 | 42 | 7 | 5 |

== Results ==
=== Draw 1 ===
January 23, 10:30 AM PT

| Sheet A | 1 | 2 | 3 | 4 | 5 | 6 | 7 | 8 | 9 | 10 | Final |
|---|---|---|---|---|---|---|---|---|---|---|---|
| Scott | 3 | 0 | 0 | 1 | 0 | 3 | 0 | 0 | 2 | X | 9 |
| Backe | 0 | 0 | 1 | 0 | 2 | 0 | 1 | 1 | 0 | X | 5 |

| Sheet B | 1 | 2 | 3 | 4 | 5 | 6 | 7 | 8 | 9 | 10 | 11 | Final |
|---|---|---|---|---|---|---|---|---|---|---|---|---|
| Rusnell | 0 | 1 | 0 | 1 | 2 | 0 | 0 | 1 | 1 | 0 | 1 | 7 |
| Thompson | 0 | 0 | 3 | 0 | 0 | 0 | 2 | 0 | 0 | 1 | 0 | 6 |

| Sheet C | 1 | 2 | 3 | 4 | 5 | 6 | 7 | 8 | 9 | 10 | Final |
|---|---|---|---|---|---|---|---|---|---|---|---|
| Richter | 0 | 1 | 0 | 1 | 0 | 1 | 1 | 0 | X | X | 4 |
| Craig | 0 | 0 | 3 | 0 | 5 | 0 | 0 | 1 | X | X | 9 |

| Sheet D | 1 | 2 | 3 | 4 | 5 | 6 | 7 | 8 | 9 | 10 | Final |
|---|---|---|---|---|---|---|---|---|---|---|---|
| Garvey | 1 | 1 | 0 | 0 | 0 | 1 | 0 | 0 | 1 | 0 | 4 |
| MacInnes | 0 | 0 | 2 | 1 | 2 | 0 | 0 | 1 | 0 | 1 | 7 |

| Sheet E | 1 | 2 | 3 | 4 | 5 | 6 | 7 | 8 | 9 | 10 | Final |
|---|---|---|---|---|---|---|---|---|---|---|---|
| Mallett | 0 | 1 | 0 | 2 | 0 | 0 | 0 | 1 | 2 | 3 | 9 |
| Law | 0 | 0 | 1 | 0 | 3 | 0 | 4 | 0 | 0 | 0 | 8 |

=== Draw 2 ===
January 23, 6:30 PM PT

| Sheet A | 1 | 2 | 3 | 4 | 5 | 6 | 7 | 8 | 9 | 10 | Final |
|---|---|---|---|---|---|---|---|---|---|---|---|
| Garvey | 0 | 2 | 0 | 0 | 1 | 0 | 1 | 0 | 1 | 0 | 5 |
| Rusnell | 1 | 0 | 1 | 0 | 0 | 1 | 0 | 2 | 0 | 1 | 6 |

| Sheet B | 1 | 2 | 3 | 4 | 5 | 6 | 7 | 8 | 9 | 10 | Final |
|---|---|---|---|---|---|---|---|---|---|---|---|
| Scott | 0 | 0 | 0 | 2 | 1 | 1 | 0 | 1 | 0 | X | 5 |
| Craig | 0 | 0 | 1 | 0 | 0 | 0 | 1 | 0 | 1 | X | 3 |

| Sheet C | 1 | 2 | 3 | 4 | 5 | 6 | 7 | 8 | 9 | 10 | Final |
|---|---|---|---|---|---|---|---|---|---|---|---|
| Backe | 1 | 0 | 0 | 0 | 0 | 1 | 0 | 1 | 0 | X | 3 |
| Mallett | 0 | 0 | 0 | 2 | 0 | 0 | 2 | 0 | 2 | X | 6 |

| Sheet D | 1 | 2 | 3 | 4 | 5 | 6 | 7 | 8 | 9 | 10 | 11 | Final |
|---|---|---|---|---|---|---|---|---|---|---|---|---|
| Richter | 0 | 1 | 0 | 1 | 1 | 0 | 0 | 0 | 0 | 2 | 0 | 5 |
| Law | 0 | 0 | 2 | 0 | 0 | 1 | 1 | 0 | 1 | 0 | 2 | 7 |

| Sheet E | 1 | 2 | 3 | 4 | 5 | 6 | 7 | 8 | 9 | 10 | Final |
|---|---|---|---|---|---|---|---|---|---|---|---|
| MacInnes | 1 | 0 | 0 | 2 | 0 | 2 | 0 | 2 | 0 | 1 | 8 |
| Thompson | 0 | 2 | 2 | 0 | 2 | 0 | 0 | 0 | 0 | 0 | 6 |

=== Draw 3 ===
January 24, 10:30 AM PT

| Sheet A | 1 | 2 | 3 | 4 | 5 | 6 | 7 | 8 | 9 | 10 | Final |
|---|---|---|---|---|---|---|---|---|---|---|---|
| Thompson | 0 | 2 | 0 | 0 | 0 | 0 | 2 | 1 | 0 | 2 | 7 |
| Richter | 2 | 0 | 1 | 0 | 2 | 1 | 0 | 0 | 0 | 0 | 6 |

| Sheet B | 1 | 2 | 3 | 4 | 5 | 6 | 7 | 8 | 9 | 10 | Final |
|---|---|---|---|---|---|---|---|---|---|---|---|
| Mallett | 0 | 0 | 2 | 0 | 1 | 0 | 1 | 0 | 2 | 0 | 6 |
| MacInnes | 2 | 0 | 0 | 2 | 0 | 1 | 0 | 1 | 0 | 2 | 8 |

| Sheet C | 1 | 2 | 3 | 4 | 5 | 6 | 7 | 8 | 9 | 10 | Final |
|---|---|---|---|---|---|---|---|---|---|---|---|
| Law | 0 | 2 | 0 | 1 | 0 | 0 | 1 | 1 | 0 | X | 5 |
| Scott | 2 | 0 | 3 | 0 | 1 | 1 | 0 | 0 | 3 | X | 10 |

| Sheet D | 1 | 2 | 3 | 4 | 5 | 6 | 7 | 8 | 9 | 10 | Final |
|---|---|---|---|---|---|---|---|---|---|---|---|
| Rusnell | 0 | 0 | 1 | 0 | 0 | 2 | 0 | 0 | 1 | 0 | 4 |
| Backe | 0 | 0 | 0 | 0 | 1 | 0 | 2 | 0 | 0 | 4 | 8 |

| Sheet E | 1 | 2 | 3 | 4 | 5 | 6 | 7 | 8 | 9 | 10 | Final |
|---|---|---|---|---|---|---|---|---|---|---|---|
| Craig | 0 | 3 | 0 | 2 | 2 | 1 | 0 | X | X | X | 8 |
| Garvey | 1 | 0 | 1 | 0 | 0 | 0 | 1 | X | X | X | 3 |

=== Draw 4 ===
January 24, 6:30 PM PT

| Sheet A | 1 | 2 | 3 | 4 | 5 | 6 | 7 | 8 | 9 | 10 | Final |
|---|---|---|---|---|---|---|---|---|---|---|---|
| Mallett | 2 | 0 | 1 | 0 | 1 | 0 | 0 | 1 | 1 | 0 | 6 |
| Scott | 0 | 1 | 0 | 1 | 0 | 2 | 2 | 0 | 0 | 1 | 7 |

| Sheet B | 1 | 2 | 3 | 4 | 5 | 6 | 7 | 8 | 9 | 10 | Final |
|---|---|---|---|---|---|---|---|---|---|---|---|
| Richter | 0 | 0 | 1 | 0 | 0 | 0 | 1 | 0 | 1 | 0 | 3 |
| Rusnell | 1 | 1 | 0 | 0 | 0 | 0 | 0 | 1 | 0 | 1 | 4 |

| Sheet C | 1 | 2 | 3 | 4 | 5 | 6 | 7 | 8 | 9 | 10 | Final |
|---|---|---|---|---|---|---|---|---|---|---|---|
| Thompson | 2 | 0 | 3 | 2 | 1 | X | X | X | X | X | 8 |
| Garvey | 0 | 1 | 0 | 0 | 0 | X | X | X | X | X | 1 |

| Sheet D | 1 | 2 | 3 | 4 | 5 | 6 | 7 | 8 | 9 | 10 | Final |
|---|---|---|---|---|---|---|---|---|---|---|---|
| MacInnes | 1 | 0 | 0 | 0 | 1 | 0 | 1 | 0 | 2 | 0 | 5 |
| Craig | 0 | 1 | 0 | 2 | 0 | 1 | 0 | 1 | 0 | 1 | 6 |

| Sheet E | 1 | 2 | 3 | 4 | 5 | 6 | 7 | 8 | 9 | 10 | Final |
|---|---|---|---|---|---|---|---|---|---|---|---|
| Law | 2 | 0 | 0 | 1 | 0 | 2 | 1 | 0 | 1 | X | 7 |
| Backe | 0 | 1 | 0 | 0 | 2 | 0 | 0 | 1 | 0 | X | 4 |

=== Draw 5 ===
January 25, 10:30 AM PT

| Sheet A | 1 | 2 | 3 | 4 | 5 | 6 | 7 | 8 | 9 | 10 | Final |
|---|---|---|---|---|---|---|---|---|---|---|---|
| Law | 2 | 1 | 1 | 0 | 0 | 1 | 0 | 0 | 0 | 3 | 8 |
| Garvey | 0 | 0 | 0 | 1 | 1 | 0 | 0 | 2 | 0 | 0 | 4 |

| Sheet B | 1 | 2 | 3 | 4 | 5 | 6 | 7 | 8 | 9 | 10 | Final |
|---|---|---|---|---|---|---|---|---|---|---|---|
| Craig | 1 | 0 | 0 | 0 | 2 | 0 | 1 | 0 | 2 | 0 | 6 |
| Backe | 0 | 0 | 1 | 2 | 0 | 1 | 0 | 3 | 0 | 1 | 8 |

| Sheet C | 1 | 2 | 3 | 4 | 5 | 6 | 7 | 8 | 9 | 10 | Final |
|---|---|---|---|---|---|---|---|---|---|---|---|
| Rusnell | 0 | 0 | 0 | 0 | 2 | 0 | 0 | 2 | 0 | 2 | 6 |
| MacInnes | 0 | 0 | 0 | 1 | 0 | 2 | 0 | 0 | 1 | 0 | 4 |

| Sheet D | 1 | 2 | 3 | 4 | 5 | 6 | 7 | 8 | 9 | 10 | Final |
|---|---|---|---|---|---|---|---|---|---|---|---|
| Thompson | 0 | 0 | 1 | 0 | 0 | 2 | 1 | 0 | 1 | 0 | 5 |
| Scott | 1 | 1 | 0 | 1 | 1 | 0 | 0 | 1 | 0 | 1 | 6 |

| Sheet E | 1 | 2 | 3 | 4 | 5 | 6 | 7 | 8 | 9 | 10 | Final |
|---|---|---|---|---|---|---|---|---|---|---|---|
| Richter | 1 | 0 | 2 | 0 | 3 | 0 | 2 | 0 | 2 | 2 | 12 |
| Mallett | 0 | 1 | 0 | 1 | 0 | 3 | 0 | 3 | 0 | 0 | 8 |

=== Draw 6 ===
January 25, 6:30 PM PT

| Sheet A | 1 | 2 | 3 | 4 | 5 | 6 | 7 | 8 | 9 | 10 | Final |
|---|---|---|---|---|---|---|---|---|---|---|---|
| Richter | 1 | 0 | 3 | 0 | 2 | 3 | 0 | 2 | 0 | X | 11 |
| MacInnes | 0 | 1 | 0 | 3 | 0 | 0 | 2 | 0 | 3 | X | 9 |

| Sheet B | 1 | 2 | 3 | 4 | 5 | 6 | 7 | 8 | 9 | 10 | Final |
|---|---|---|---|---|---|---|---|---|---|---|---|
| Thompson | 0 | 0 | 1 | 0 | 1 | 0 | 3 | 0 | X | X | 5 |
| Law | 0 | 0 | 0 | 3 | 0 | 5 | 0 | 2 | X | X | 10 |

| Sheet C | 1 | 2 | 3 | 4 | 5 | 6 | 7 | 8 | 9 | 10 | Final |
|---|---|---|---|---|---|---|---|---|---|---|---|
| Garvey | 0 | 3 | 0 | 0 | 1 | 0 | 0 | 1 | 0 | X | 5 |
| Backe | 1 | 0 | 3 | 2 | 0 | 1 | 1 | 0 | 1 | X | 9 |

| Sheet D | 1 | 2 | 3 | 4 | 5 | 6 | 7 | 8 | 9 | 10 | Final |
|---|---|---|---|---|---|---|---|---|---|---|---|
| Craig | 1 | 0 | 0 | 0 | 2 | 0 | 0 | 3 | 0 | 0 | 6 |
| Mallett | 0 | 0 | 2 | 2 | 0 | 1 | 1 | 0 | 0 | 2 | 8 |

| Sheet E | 1 | 2 | 3 | 4 | 5 | 6 | 7 | 8 | 9 | 10 | Final |
|---|---|---|---|---|---|---|---|---|---|---|---|
| Scott | 0 | 0 | 0 | 2 | 1 | 0 | 0 | 1 | 0 | 1 | 5 |
| Rusnell | 0 | 1 | 1 | 0 | 0 | 0 | 1 | 0 | 0 | 0 | 3 |

=== Draw 7 ===
January 26, 10:30 AM PT

| Sheet A | 1 | 2 | 3 | 4 | 5 | 6 | 7 | 8 | 9 | 10 | Final |
|---|---|---|---|---|---|---|---|---|---|---|---|
| Craig | 0 | 1 | 0 | 1 | 0 | 2 | 0 | 2 | 0 | 0 | 6 |
| Thompson | 1 | 0 | 1 | 0 | 2 | 0 | 0 | 0 | 0 | 0 | 4 |

| Sheet B | 1 | 2 | 3 | 4 | 5 | 6 | 7 | 8 | 9 | 10 | Final |
|---|---|---|---|---|---|---|---|---|---|---|---|
| Garvey | 0 | 0 | 0 | 1 | 0 | 0 | 2 | 0 | 2 | 0 | 5 |
| Mallett | 1 | 0 | 0 | 0 | 2 | 1 | 0 | 1 | 0 | 1 | 6 |

| Sheet C | 1 | 2 | 3 | 4 | 5 | 6 | 7 | 8 | 9 | 10 | Final |
|---|---|---|---|---|---|---|---|---|---|---|---|
| Scott | 0 | 1 | 0 | 0 | 1 | 0 | 2 | 0 | 2 | 0 | 6 |
| Richter | 3 | 0 | 1 | 0 | 0 | 1 | 0 | 1 | 0 | 1 | 7 |

| Sheet D | 1 | 2 | 3 | 4 | 5 | 6 | 7 | 8 | 9 | 10 | Final |
|---|---|---|---|---|---|---|---|---|---|---|---|
| Law | 0 | 0 | 1 | 0 | 0 | 0 | 0 | 2 | 0 | 0 | 3 |
| Rusnell | 1 | 0 | 0 | 0 | 2 | 1 | 1 | 0 | 1 | 1 | 7 |

| Sheet E | 1 | 2 | 3 | 4 | 5 | 6 | 7 | 8 | 9 | 10 | Final |
|---|---|---|---|---|---|---|---|---|---|---|---|
| Backe | 0 | 0 | 1 | 0 | 3 | 1 | 1 | 0 | 3 | X | 9 |
| MacInnes | 0 | 0 | 0 | 1 | 0 | 0 | 0 | 1 | 0 | X | 2 |

=== Draw 8 ===
January 26, 6:30 PM PT

| Sheet A | 1 | 2 | 3 | 4 | 5 | 6 | 7 | 8 | 9 | 10 | Final |
|---|---|---|---|---|---|---|---|---|---|---|---|
| Rusnell | 0 | 1 | 0 | 1 | 0 | 0 | 0 | X | X | X | 2 |
| Mallett | 3 | 0 | 2 | 0 | 1 | 2 | 2 | X | X | X | 10 |

| Sheet B | 1 | 2 | 3 | 4 | 5 | 6 | 7 | 8 | 9 | 10 | Final |
|---|---|---|---|---|---|---|---|---|---|---|---|
| MacInnes | 0 | 1 | 0 | 1 | 0 | 1 | 0 | 2 | 1 | 2 | 8 |
| Scott | 2 | 0 | 2 | 0 | 1 | 0 | 1 | 0 | 0 | 0 | 6 |

| Sheet C | 1 | 2 | 3 | 4 | 5 | 6 | 7 | 8 | 9 | 10 | 11 | Final |
|---|---|---|---|---|---|---|---|---|---|---|---|---|
| Craig | 1 | 0 | 2 | 3 | 0 | 2 | 0 | 1 | 0 | 0 | 1 | 10 |
| Law | 0 | 2 | 0 | 0 | 1 | 0 | 4 | 0 | 1 | 1 | 0 | 9 |

| Sheet D | 1 | 2 | 3 | 4 | 5 | 6 | 7 | 8 | 9 | 10 | Final |
|---|---|---|---|---|---|---|---|---|---|---|---|
| Backe | 0 | 1 | 0 | 1 | 0 | 1 | 0 | 2 | 0 | 2 | 7 |
| Thompson | 0 | 0 | 1 | 0 | 1 | 0 | 1 | 0 | 0 | 0 | 3 |

| Sheet E | 1 | 2 | 3 | 4 | 5 | 6 | 7 | 8 | 9 | 10 | Final |
|---|---|---|---|---|---|---|---|---|---|---|---|
| Garvey | 0 | 1 | 0 | 1 | 0 | 2 | 0 | 1 | 0 | X | 5 |
| Richter | 1 | 0 | 2 | 0 | 2 | 0 | 1 | 0 | 2 | X | 8 |

=== Draw 9 ===
January 27, 9:30 AM PT

| Sheet A | 1 | 2 | 3 | 4 | 5 | 6 | 7 | 8 | 9 | 10 | Final |
|---|---|---|---|---|---|---|---|---|---|---|---|
| MacInnes | 0 | 1 | 0 | 0 | 1 | 0 | 0 | 1 | 0 | 0 | 3 |
| Law | 0 | 0 | 1 | 1 | 0 | 0 | 2 | 0 | 2 | 2 | 8 |

| Sheet B | 1 | 2 | 3 | 4 | 5 | 6 | 7 | 8 | 9 | 10 | Final |
|---|---|---|---|---|---|---|---|---|---|---|---|
| Backe | 0 | 1 | 0 | 2 | 1 | 0 | 0 | 0 | 1 | 1 | 6 |
| Richter | 2 | 0 | 1 | 0 | 0 | 0 | 2 | 2 | 0 | 0 | 7 |

| Sheet C | 1 | 2 | 3 | 4 | 5 | 6 | 7 | 8 | 9 | 10 | Final |
|---|---|---|---|---|---|---|---|---|---|---|---|
| Mallett | 1 | 0 | 1 | 0 | 0 | 1 | 1 | 0 | 3 | X | 7 |
| Thompson | 0 | 2 | 0 | 1 | 0 | 0 | 0 | 1 | 0 | X | 4 |

| Sheet D | 1 | 2 | 3 | 4 | 5 | 6 | 7 | 8 | 9 | 10 | Final |
|---|---|---|---|---|---|---|---|---|---|---|---|
| Scott | 0 | 1 | 0 | 0 | 2 | 2 | 0 | 1 | 0 | 1 | 7 |
| Garvey | 1 | 0 | 0 | 1 | 0 | 0 | 1 | 0 | 2 | 0 | 5 |

| Sheet E | 1 | 2 | 3 | 4 | 5 | 6 | 7 | 8 | 9 | 10 | Final |
|---|---|---|---|---|---|---|---|---|---|---|---|
| Rusnell | 0 | 0 | 0 | 0 | 0 | 3 | 0 | 0 | 2 | X | 5 |
| Craig | 1 | 0 | 0 | 1 | 1 | 0 | 2 | 2 | 0 | X | 7 |

=== Tie Breaker 1 ===
January 27, 2:30 PM PT

| Sheet A | 1 | 2 | 3 | 4 | 5 | 6 | 7 | 8 | 9 | 10 | Final |
|---|---|---|---|---|---|---|---|---|---|---|---|
| Rusnell | 1 | 0 | 2 | 0 | 1 | 1 | 0 | 2 | 1 | X | 8 |
| Backe | 0 | 0 | 0 | 1 | 0 | 0 | 2 | 0 | 0 | X | 3 |

| Sheet C | 1 | 2 | 3 | 4 | 5 | 6 | 7 | 8 | 9 | 10 | Final |
|---|---|---|---|---|---|---|---|---|---|---|---|
| Law | 0 | 2 | 0 | 2 | 0 | 0 | 0 | 2 | 0 | 1 | 7 |
| Richter | 0 | 0 | 2 | 0 | 1 | 1 | 1 | 0 | 1 | 0 | 6 |

=== Tie Breaker 2 ===
January 27, 7:00 PM PT

| Sheet B | 1 | 2 | 3 | 4 | 5 | 6 | 7 | 8 | 9 | 10 | Final |
|---|---|---|---|---|---|---|---|---|---|---|---|
| Rusnell | 0 | 0 | 1 | 0 | 0 | 1 | 0 | 0 | 0 | 0 | 2 |
| Law | 0 | 0 | 0 | 1 | 0 | 0 | 2 | 0 | 0 | 3 | 6 |

== Playoffs ==
Page playoff system
1 | Kelly Scott | 5
2 | Marla Mallett | 10
3 | Roselyn Craig | 5
4 | Kelley Law | 7

Semifinal
1 | Kelly Scott | 9
4 | Kelley Law | 7

Final
2 | Marla Mallett | 5
1 | Kelly Scott | 6

=== 1 vs. 2 ===
January 27, 7:00 PM PT

| Sheet A | 1 | 2 | 3 | 4 | 5 | 6 | 7 | 8 | 9 | 10 | 11 | Final |
|---|---|---|---|---|---|---|---|---|---|---|---|---|
| Scott | 1 | 0 | 0 | 1 | 0 | 0 | 1 | 0 | 1 | 1 | 0 | 5 |
| Mallett | 0 | 0 | 2 | 0 | 1 | 1 | 0 | 1 | 0 | 0 | 5 | 10 |

=== 3 vs. 4 ===
January 28, 10:00 AM PT

| Sheet A | 1 | 2 | 3 | 4 | 5 | 6 | 7 | 8 | 9 | 10 | Final |
|---|---|---|---|---|---|---|---|---|---|---|---|
| Craig | 2 | 0 | 1 | 0 | 0 | 1 | 1 | 0 | 0 | 0 | 5 |
| Law | 0 | 1 | 0 | 3 | 1 | 0 | 0 | 1 | 0 | 1 | 7 |

=== Semifinal ===
January 28, 6:00 PM PT

| Sheet A | 1 | 2 | 3 | 4 | 5 | 6 | 7 | 8 | 9 | 10 | Final |
|---|---|---|---|---|---|---|---|---|---|---|---|
| Scott | 2 | 0 | 1 | 0 | 3 | 0 | 2 | 1 | 0 | X | 9 |
| Law | 0 | 3 | 0 | 1 | 0 | 1 | 0 | 0 | 2 | X | 7 |

=== Final ===
January 29, 4:30 PM PT

| Sheet A | 1 | 2 | 3 | 4 | 5 | 6 | 7 | 8 | 9 | 10 | Final |
|---|---|---|---|---|---|---|---|---|---|---|---|
| Mallett | 1 | 0 | 0 | 1 | 0 | 1 | 0 | 2 | 0 | 0 | 5 |
| Scott | 0 | 0 | 2 | 0 | 1 | 0 | 2 | 0 | 0 | 1 | 6 |

2012 British Columbia Scotties Tournament of Hearts

Kelly Scott
British Columbia Provincial Championship title

== Qualification rounds ==
=== Round 1 ===
The first qualification round for the 2012 British Columbia Scotties took place from November 19 to 20, 2011 at the Creston Curling Club in Creston, British Columbia. The qualifier was held in a double knockout format, and qualified two teams for the provincial playdowns.

==== Teams ====
| Skip | Third | Second | Lead | Club(s) |
|---|---|---|---|---|
| Jill Andrews | Holly Jones | Theresa Wood | Stephanie Schroeder | Invermere Curling Club, Invermere |
| Jill Klapp | Jodi Borys | Julie Winter | Adele Borys | Elkford Curling Club, Elkfod |
| Allison MacInnes | Grace MacInnes | Diane Gushulak | Amanda Guido | Kamloops Curling Club, Kamloops |
| Desiree Schmidt | Brittany Palmer | Heather Nichol | Courtney Schmidt | Beaver Valley Curling Club, Fruitvale |
| Karla Thompson | Roberta Kuhn | Christen Wilson | Kristen Gentile | Kamloops Curling Club, Kamloops |
| Kelly Thompson | Kimberly Thompson | Pamela Lai | Janelle Sakamoto | Richmond Curling Club, Richmond |
| Carrie Will | Karla McKie | Melissa Creelman | Michelle Martin | Sparwood Curling Club, Sparwood |

==== A Qualifier ====
Quarterfinals
Allison MacInnes | 8
Jill Klapp | 7
Jill Andrews | 7
Carrie Will | 3
Desiree Schmidt | 3
Kelly Thompson | 5

Semifinals
Allison MacInnes | 6
Jill Andrews | 4
Kelly Thompson | 8
Karla Thompson | 5

A-Final
Allison MacInnes | 6
Kelly Thompson | 4

==== B Qualifier ====
Round of 16
Jill Klapp | 9
Carrie Will | 3

Quarterfinals
Karla Thompson | 12
Jill Klapp | 1
Desiree Schmidt | 8
Jill Andrews | 3

Semifinals
Karla Thompson | 4
Desiree Schmidt | 9

B-Final
Kelly Thompson | 6
Desiree Schmidt | 3

=== Round 2 ===
The second qualification round for the 2012 British Columbia Scotties took place from November 26 to 27, 2011, at the Juan de Fuca Curling Club in Victoria, British Columbia. The qualifier was held in a double knockout format, and qualified two teams for the provincial playdowns.

==== Teams ====
| Skip | Third | Second | Lead | Club(s) |
|---|---|---|---|---|
| Leanne Andrews | Donna Langlands | Andrea Smith | Victoria Murphy | Royal City Curling Club, New Westminster |
| Nicole Backe | Rachelle Kallechy | Lindsae Page | Kelsi Jones | Royal City Curling Club, New Westminster |
| Sarah Wark | Michelle Allen | Simone Brosseau | Roselyn Craig (skip) | Victoria Curling Club, Victoria |
| Kristy Lewis | Marilou Richter | Michelle Ramsay | Sandra Comadina | Richmond Curling Club, Richmond |
| Jen Rusnell | Kristen Fewster | Blaine Richards | Amber Cheveldave | Prince George Curling Club, Prince George |

==== A Qualifier ====
Quarterfinals
Jen Rusnell | 5
Leanne Andrews | 11

Semifinals
Leanne Andrews | 5
Roselyn Craig | 6
Kristy Lewis | 5
Nicole Backe | 8

A-Final
Roselyn Craig | 9
Nicole Backe | 7

==== B Qualifier ====
| Quarterfinals | | Semifinals | | B-Final |
| | | Kristy Lewis | 7 |
| Jen Rusnell | 2 | Leanne Andrews | 6 |
| Kristy Lewis | 10 | | | Kristy Lewis | 5 |
| | | | | Nicole Backe | 8 |

=== Round 3 ===
The third qualification round for the 2012 British Columbia Scotties took place from December 3 to 4, 2011 at the McArthur Island Curling Club in Kamloops, British Columbia. The qualifier was held in a double knockout format, and qualified two teams for the provincial playdowns.

==== Teams ====
| Skip | Third | Second | Lead | Club(s) |
|---|---|---|---|---|
| Leanne Andrews | Donna Langlands | Andrea Smith | Victoria Murphy | Royal City Curling Club, New Westminster |
| Simone Groundwater | Laura Ball | Mallory Geier | Marla Guldbransen | Williams Lake Curling Club, Williams Lake |
| Patti Knezevic | Brenda Garvey | Chelan Cotter | Rhonda Camozzi | Kamloops Curling Club, Kamloops |
| Kristy Lewis | Marilou Richter | Michelle Ramsay | Sandra Comadina | Richmond Curling Club, Richmond |
| Kristen Meersman | Kelsey Schwindt | Ashley Gray | Courtenay Nordin | Kamloops Curling Club, Kamloops |
| Jen Rusnell | Kristen Fewster | Blaine Richards | Amber Cheveldave | Prince George Curling Club, Prince George |
| Karla Thompson | Roberta Kuhn | Christen Wilson | Kristen Gentile | Kamloops Curling Club, Kamloops |
| Leanne Ursel | Heather Tyre | Judy Conway | Trishia Pink | Kelowna Curling Club, Kelowna |

==== A Qualifier ====
Quarterfinals
Kristy Lewis | 10
Kristen Meersman | 4
Patti Knezevic | 6
Leanne Ursel | 5
Karla Thompson | 8
Leanne Andrews | 7
Jen Rusnell | 11
Simone Groundwater | 3

Semifinals
Kristy Lewis | 3
Patti Knezevic | 7
Karla Thompson | 3
Jen Rusnell | 7

A-Final
Patti Knezevic | 4
Jen Rusnell | 6

==== B Qualifier ====
Round of 16
Kristen Meersman | 2
Leanne Ursel | 5
Leanne Andrews | 6
Simone Groundwater | 2

Quarterfinals
Leanne Ursel | 4
Karla Thompson | 5
Leanne Andrews | 8
Kristy Lewis | 5

Semifinals
Karla Thompson | 7
Leanne Andrews | 3

B-Final
Karla Thompson | 5
Patti Knezevic | 7

=== Round 4 ===
The fourth and final qualification round for the 2012 British Columbia Scotties took place from December 16 to 18, 2011 at the Chilliwack Curling Club in Chilliwack, British Columbia. The qualifier was held in a double knockout format, and qualified two teams for the provincial playdowns.

==== Teams ====
| Skip | Third | Second | Lead | Club(s) |
|---|---|---|---|---|
| Leanne Andrews | Donna Langlands | Andrea Smith | Victoria Murphy | Royal City Curling Club, New Westminster |
| Lisa Deputan | Brittany McAulay | Erin Light | Kayleigh Alendal | Chilliwack Curling Club, Chilliwack |
| Simone Groundwater | Laura Ball | Mallory Geier | Marla Guldbransen | Williams Lake Curling Club, Williams Lake |
| Marla Mallett | Kelly Shimizu | Danielle Callens | Barbara Zbeetnoff | Royal City Curling Club, New Westminster |
| Marilou Richter | Darah Provencal | Michelle Ramsay | Sandra Comadina | Richmond Curling Club, Richmond |

==== A Qualifier ====
Quarterfinals
Lisa Deputan | 1
Leanne Andrews | 10

Semifinals
Leanne Andrews | 7
Marla Mallett | 6
Marilou Richter | 7
Simone Groundwater | 5

A-Final
Leanne Andrews | 4
Marilou Richter | 9

==== B Qualifier ====
| Quarterfinals | | Semifinals | | B-Final |
| | | Simone Groundwater | 8 |
| Lisa Deputan | 2 | Marla Mallett | 10 |
| Simone Groundwater | 8 | | | Marla Mallett | 9 |
| | | | | Leanne Andrews | 8 |
