= BC Women's Curling Championship =

Curling competition

- Established: 1951
- 2026 host city: Esquimalt, British Columbia
- 2026 arena: Archie Browning Sports Centre
- 2026 champion: Taylor Reese-Hansen

Current edition
- 2026 BC Women's Curling Championship

The BC Women's Curling Championship, formerly the British Columbia Scotties Tournament of Hearts is the championship of women's curling in the Canadian province of British Columbia. The tournament is run by Curl BC, the provincial curling association. The winning team represents British Columbia at the Scotties Tournament of Hearts.

== Past winners ==
National champions in bold. Western Canada champions (1953–1960) in italics.

Year	Team	Curling club(s)
2026	Taylor Reese-Hansen, Megan McGillivray, Kim Bonneau, Julianna MacKenzie	Victoria Curling Club
2025	Corryn Brown, Erin Pincott, Sarah Koltun, Samantha Fisher	Kamloops Curling Club
2024	Clancy Grandy, Kayla MacMillan, Lindsay Dubue, Sarah Loken	Vancouver Curling Club
2023	Clancy Grandy, Kayla MacMillan, Lindsay Dubue, Sarah Loken	Vancouver Curling Club
2022	Mary-Anne Arsenault, Jeanna Schraeder, Sasha Carter, Renee Simons	Kelowna Curling Club
2021	Cancelled due to the COVID-19 pandemic in British Columbia. Team Brown (Corryn Brown, Erin Pincott, Dezaray Hawes, Samantha Fisher) represented B.C. at Scotties.	
2020	Corryn Brown, Erin Pincott, Dezaray Hawes, Ashley Klymchuk	Kamloops Curling Club; Royal City Curling Club
2019	Sarah Wark, Kristen Pilote, Carley Sandwith, Jen Rusnell	Abbotsford Curling Club
2018	Kesa Van Osch, Marika Van Osch, Kalia Van Osch, Amy Gibson	Nanaimo Curling Club
2017	Marla Mallett, Shannon Aleksic, Brette Richards, Blaine de Jager	Golden Ears Winter Club
2016	Karla Thompson, Kristen Recksiedler, Tracey Lavery, Trysta Vandale	Kamloops Curling Club
2015	Patti Knezevic, Kristen Fewster, Jen Rusnell, Rhonda Camozzi	Prince George Curling Club; Howe Sound Curling Club
2014	Kesa Van Osch, Stephanie Baier, Jessie Sanderson, Carley Sandwith	Victoria Curling Club
2013	Kelly Scott, Jeanna Schraeder, Sasha Carter, Sarah Wazney	Kelowna Curling Club
2012	Kelly Scott, Jeanna Schraeder, Dailene Sivertson, Jacquie Armstrong	Kelowna Curling Club
2011	Kelly Scott, Jeanna Schraeder, Sasha Carter, Jacquie Armstrong	Kelowna Curling Club
2010	Kelly Scott, Jeanna Schraeder, Sasha Carter, Jacquie Armstrong	Kelowna Curling Club
2009	Marla Mallett, Grace MacInnes, Diane Gushulak, Jacalyn Brown	Vancouver Curling Club
2008	Allison MacInnes, Karla Sparks, Janelle Yardley, Amanda Brennan	Kamloops Curling Club
2007	Kelley Law, Georgina Wheatcroft, Shannon Aleksic, Darah Provencal	Royal City Curling Club
2006	**Kelly Scott, Jeanna Schraeder, Sasha Carter, Renee Simons**	Kelowna Curling Club
2005	Kelly Scott, Michelle Allen, Sasha Carter, Renee Simons, Jeanna Schraeder	Kelowna Curling Club
2004	Georgina Wheatcroft, Diane McLean, Shellan Reed, Diane Dezura	Royal City Curling Club
2003	Toni Fister, Teri Fister, Denise Byers, Angela Strachan	Golden Ears Curling Club
2002	Kristy Lewis, Krista Bernard, Denise Blashko, Susan Allen	Richmond Curling Club
2001	Shelley MacDonald, Lisa Whitaker, Adina Tasaka, Jacalyn Brown	Richmond Curling Club
2000	**Kelley Law, Julie Skinner, Georgina Wheatcroft, Diane Nelson**	Richmond Curling Club
1999	Pat Sanders, Michelle Harding, Cindy Tucker, Denise Byers	Victoria Curling Club
1998	Sue Garvey, Jan Wiltzen, Allison MacInnes, Valerie Lahucik	Kamloops Curling Club
1997	Kelley Owen, Marla Geiger, Sherry Fraser, Christine Jurgenson	Richmond Curling Club
1996	Jodi Busche, Lorelei Garnett, Debra London, Bev Wieler	Fort St. John Curling Club
1995	Marla Geiger, Kelley Owen, Sherry Fraser, Christine Jurgenson	Richmond Curling Club
1994	Diane Dalio, Donna Gervais, Rae Ann Copeland, Lorraine Flannigan	Prince George Curling Club
1993	Julie Sutton, Jodie Sutton, Melissa Soligo, Karri Willms	Victoria Curling Club
1992	Lisa Walker, Kelley Owens, Cindy McArdle, Cathy Sauer	Richmond Curling Club
1991	**Julie Sutton, Jodie Sutton, Melissa Soligo, Karri Willms**	Victoria Curling Club
1990	Kelley Atkins, Donna Maitland, Karen Koyanagi, Terry Ridley	Golden Ears Curling Club; Hanley Curling Club
1989	Julie Sutton, Pat Sanders, Georgina Hawkes, Melissa Soligo	Victoria Curling Club
1988	Christine Stevenson, Cindy Tucker, Diane Nelson, Sandra Martin	Esquimalt Curling Club
1987	**Pat Sanders, Georgina Hawkes, Louise Herlinveaux, Deb Massullo**	Victoria Curling Club
1986	Heather Kerr, Bernice McCallan, Sherry Lethbridge, Rita Imai	Richmond Curling Club
1985	**Linda Moore, Lindsay Sparkes, Debbie Jones, Laurie Carney**	North Vancouver Curling Club
1984	Lindsay Sparkes, Linda Moore, Debbie Orr, Laurie Carney	North Vancouver Curling Club
1983	Heather Kerr, Bernice McCallan, Sherry Lethbridge, Sandy McCubbin	Richmond Curling Club
1982	Barbara Parker, Sharon Hastings, Donna Cunliffe, Sheila Mellis	Courtenay Curling Club
1981	Barbara Parker, Sharon Hastings, Donna Cunliffe, Sheila Mellis	Courtenay Curling Club
1980	Joan Dexter, Lou Logan, Nance Turney, Lynne Axford	New Westminster Curling Club
1979	**Lindsay Sparkes, Dawn Knowles, Robin Wilson, Lorraine Bowles**	North Vancouver Curling Club
1978	Heather Haywood, Bernice McCallan, Shirley Snihur, Una Goodyear	Richmond Curling Club
1977	Heather Kerr, Bernice McCallan, Shirley Snihur, Una Goodyear	Richmond Curling Club
1976	Lindsay Davie, Dawn Knowles, Robin Klassen, Lorraine Bowles	North Vancouver Curling Club
1975	Marion Radcliffe, Karen Lovdahl, Phyl McCrady, Marjorie Newton	Kelowna Curling Club
1974	Marion Radcliffe, Karen Lovdahl, Phyl McCrady, Darlene Tucker	Kelowna Curling Club
1973	Karin Kaese, Shannon Blackburn, Loretta Alhstrom, Donna Dun	Nanaimo Curling Club
1972	Sharon Bettesworth, Barbara Benton, Kae Minchin, Sheila Reeves	Kitimat Curling Club
1971	Ina Hansen, Ada Callas, Carol Klinck, Gilbert Bailey	Kimberley Curling Club
1970	Donna Clark, Mavis Gordon, Majorie Mitchell, Gladys Nord	Vancouver Curling Club
1969	May Shaw, Mary Yaschuk, Carol Klinck, Barbara Weir	Kimberley Curling Club
1968	Myrtle Fashoway, Anne McLay, Fern Hawkes, Eleanor Campbell	Cranbrook Curling Club
1967	Joy Mitchell, Polly Mitchell, Verle McKeown, Sheila Phillips	Kitimat Curling Club
1966	Margaret Cook, Ruth Hebert, Eva Glover, Marion Ellison	Vancouver Curling Club
1965	Lesley Cmolik, Joyce Smart, Janet Thompson, Marnie Robertson	Kelowna Curling Club
1964	**Ina Hansen, Ada Callas, Isabel Leith, May Shaw**	Kimberley Curling Club
1963	Ina Hansen, Ada Callas, Isabel Leith, May Shaw	Kimberley Curling Club
1962	**Ina Hansen, Ada Callas, Isabel Leith, May Shaw**	Kimberley Curling Club
1961	Margaret Fuller, Sylvie Koster, Edna Quinney, Fernande Smith	Nanaimo Curling Club
1960	Irene Fraser, Vivianne Chatenay, Connir Abbot, Siana Lawrence	Vancouver Curling Club
1959	Marge Tegart, Betty Dinning, Stella Thorarinson, Blanch Nore	Salmon Arm Curling Club
1958	Lois Haddon, Betty Tansley, Isabel Campbell, Ruth Ward	Vancouver Curling Club
1957	Margaret Fuller, Pat Good, Sylvia Koster, Edna Quinney	Nanaimo Curling Club
1956	Marie McAllister, Betty Tansley, Lois Haddon, Isabel Campbell	Vancouver Curling Club
1955	Mary DeGirolaimo, Laura Wallace, Vi Bush, Muriel Hesse	Nelson Curling Club
1954	Lil Lyon, Eileen McCanell, Isabel Morris, Marg Johnston	Trail Curling Club
1953	Lu Maartman, Ina Hansen, Isabel Leith, Rose Lilley	Kimberley Curling Club
1952	Lu Maartman, Isabel Leith, Edith Livingstone, Rose Lilley	Kimberley Curling Club
1951	Anne Allen, Mary Jefferson, Phylis Carpenter, Esther Miller	Vancouver Curling Club

== See also ==
- BC Men's Curling Championship
