= 2008 British Columbia Scotties Tournament of Hearts =

- Host city: Trail, British Columbia
- Arena: Trail Curling Club
- Dates: January 23–27
- Winner: Team MacInnes
- Curling club: Kamloops CC, Kamloops
- Skip: Allison MacInnes
- Third: Karla Sparks
- Second: Janelle Yardley
- Lead: Amanda Brennan
- Finalist: Jody Maskiewich

The 2008 British Columbia Scotties Tournament of Hearts, the provincial women's curling championship for British Columbia, was held January 23 to 27 at the Trail Curling Club in Trail, British Columbia. The winning Allison MacInnes rink represented British Columbia at the 2008 Scotties Tournament of Hearts in Regina, Saskatchewan, finishing round robin with a 4–7 record.

Having won the 2007 Scotties Tournament of Hearts, Team Kelly Scott earned an automatic berth to the national championship as Team Canada. This meant British Columbia qualified two teams for the Scotties.

== Teams ==
The teams were listed as follows:

Skip	Third	Second	Lead	Club(s)
Simone Groundwater	Laura Ball	Tina Chestnut	Debbie Rand	Williams Lake CC, Williams Lake
Sandra Jenkins	Brittany Rouck	Darah Provencal	Christine Miller	Vernon CC, Vernon
Allison MacInnes	Karla Sparks	Janelle Yardley	Amanda Brennan	Kamloops CC, Kamloops
Marla Mallett	Grace MacInnes	Diane McLean	Jacalyn Brown	Royal City CC, New Westminster
Jody Maskiewich	Shannon Aleksic	Jacquie Armstrong	Shannon Gallaugher	Royal City CC, New Westminster
Kristen Recksiedler	Kristen Fox	Trysta Vandale	Julie Provost	Richmond CC, Richmond
Shellan Reed	Susan Allen	Sarah Wark	Andrea Smith	Royal City CC, New Westminster
Jill Winters	Allison Hurley	Loreen Amonson	Lisa Nevakshonoff	Nelson CC, Nelson

== Round robin standings ==
Final Round Robin standings

Key
Teams to Playoffs

Skip	W	L	W–L	PF	PA	EW	EL	BE	SE
Jody Maskiewich	6	1	1–0	51	33	29	26	13	4
Allison MacInnes	6	1	0–1	53	33	30	24	8	6
Kristen Recksiedler	5	2	–	43	38	28	25	13	4
Marla Mallett	4	3	1–0	41	35	30	23	10	10
Shellan Reed	4	3	0–1	52	37	30	27	7	6
Jill Winters	2	5	–	38	46	26	25	5	6
Sandra Jenkins	1	6	–	29	50	22	31	9	1
Simone Groundwater	0	7	–	27	59	21	35	7	3

== Round robin results ==
All draw times listed in Pacific Time (UTC−08:00).

=== Draw 1 ===
Wednesday, January 23, 12:30 pm

Sheet A	1	2	3	4	5	6	7	8	9	10	Final
Marla Mallett	0	0	2	0	0	2	0	1	0	X	5
Allison MacInnes	1	4	0	2	1	0	1	0	2	X	11

Sheet B	1	2	3	4	5	6	7	8	9	10	Final
Simone Groundwater	0	0	0	2	1	0	1	0	0	X	4
Kristen Recksiedler	0	0	2	0	0	2	0	2	3	X	9

Sheet C	1	2	3	4	5	6	7	8	9	10	Final
Shellan Reed	0	1	3	2	0	3	0	0	X	X	9
Jill Winters	2	0	0	0	1	0	1	1	X	X	5

Sheet D	1	2	3	4	5	6	7	8	9	10	Final
Jody Maskiewich	1	0	1	0	1	1	0	0	2	X	6
Sandra Jenkins	0	0	0	2	0	0	1	0	0	X	3

=== Draw 2 ===
Wednesday, January 23, 7:30 pm

Sheet A	1	2	3	4	5	6	7	8	9	10	Final
Simone Groundwater	1	0	2	0	0	2	0	2	0	0	7
Jody Maskiewich	0	2	0	3	1	0	2	0	0	1	9

Sheet B	1	2	3	4	5	6	7	8	9	10	Final
Allison MacInnes	0	3	0	1	0	1	0	1	0	1	7
Shellan Reed	2	0	2	0	1	0	0	0	1	0	6

Sheet C	1	2	3	4	5	6	7	8	9	10	Final
Kristen Recksiedler	0	2	0	2	0	1	0	2	0	1	8
Sandra Jenkins	0	0	1	0	3	0	1	0	1	0	6

Sheet D	1	2	3	4	5	6	7	8	9	10	Final
Marla Mallett	2	1	0	0	4	0	3	X	X	X	10
Jill Winters	0	0	1	1	0	1	0	X	X	X	3

=== Draw 3 ===
Thursday, January 24, 12:30 pm

Sheet A	1	2	3	4	5	6	7	8	9	10	Final
Sandra Jenkins	2	0	1	0	1	0	0	2	0	X	6
Allison MacInnes	0	1	0	2	0	2	1	0	2	X	8

Sheet B	1	2	3	4	5	6	7	8	9	10	Final
Jill Winters	1	0	0	0	1	0	2	0	0	X	4
Kristen Recksiedler	0	0	1	0	0	3	0	1	1	X	6

Sheet C	1	2	3	4	5	6	7	8	9	10	Final
Jody Maskiewich	2	0	1	0	0	0	0	3	0	X	6
Marla Mallett	0	1	0	1	0	0	1	0	0	X	3

Sheet D	1	2	3	4	5	6	7	8	9	10	Final
Shellan Reed	1	0	2	0	3	1	5	X	X	X	12
Simone Groundwater	0	1	0	0	0	0	0	X	X	X	1

=== Draw 4 ===
Thursday, January 24, 7:30 pm

Sheet A	1	2	3	4	5	6	7	8	9	10	Final
Kristen Recksiedler	1	0	1	0	1	0	2	0	1	2	8
Shellan Reed	0	1	0	1	0	1	0	1	0	0	4

Sheet B	1	2	3	4	5	6	7	8	9	10	Final
Marla Mallett	0	1	0	1	1	0	1	0	1	X	5
Sandra Jenkins	0	0	0	0	0	1	0	1	0	X	2

Sheet C	1	2	3	4	5	6	7	8	9	10	Final
Simone Groundwater	0	2	0	1	0	2	0	0	0	X	5
Jill Winters	0	0	1	0	2	0	2	1	2	X	8

Sheet D	1	2	3	4	5	6	7	8	9	10	Final
Allison MacInnes	0	1	0	1	0	0	1	0	0	X	3
Jody Maskiewich	0	0	1	0	0	2	0	2	1	X	6

=== Draw 5 ===
Friday, January 25, 12:30 pm

Sheet A	1	2	3	4	5	6	7	8	9	10	Final
Marla Mallett	1	1	1	1	0	2	1	1	X	X	8
Simone Groundwater	0	0	0	0	1	0	0	0	X	X	1

Sheet B	1	2	3	4	5	6	7	8	9	10	Final
Jody Maskiewich	2	0	0	2	0	0	2	0	4	X	10
Jill Winters	0	1	2	0	0	1	0	1	0	X	5

Sheet C	1	2	3	4	5	6	7	8	9	10	Final
Allison MacInnes	0	0	0	2	2	0	4	X	X	X	8
Kristen Recksiedler	0	0	0	0	0	1	0	X	X	X	1

Sheet D	1	2	3	4	5	6	7	8	9	10	Final
Sandra Jenkins	0	1	0	0	2	0	1	0	X	X	4
Shellan Reed	0	0	0	5	0	2	0	3	X	X	10

=== Draw 6 ===
Friday, January 25, 7:30 pm

Sheet A	1	2	3	4	5	6	7	8	9	10	Final
Jill Winters	1	0	0	3	0	3	2	X	X	X	9
Sandra Jenkins	0	0	1	0	1	0	0	X	X	X	2

Sheet B	1	2	3	4	5	6	7	8	9	10	Final
Simone Groundwater	1	1	0	1	0	1	0	0	1	0	5
Allison MacInnes	0	0	2	0	2	0	0	2	0	1	7

Sheet C	1	2	3	4	5	6	7	8	9	10	11	Final
Shellan Reed	1	0	1	0	1	1	0	0	2	0	1	7
Jody Maskiewich	0	2	0	1	0	0	0	1	0	2	0	6

Sheet D	1	2	3	4	5	6	7	8	9	10	11	Final
Kristen Recksiedler	0	1	0	0	0	1	0	2	0	0	1	5
Marla Mallett	1	0	1	0	0	0	1	0	0	1	0	4

=== Draw 7 ===
Saturday, January 26, 9:30 am

Sheet A	1	2	3	4	5	6	7	8	9	10	11	Final
Jody Maskiewich	0	0	0	1	0	2	0	0	2	0	3	8
Kristen Recksiedler	0	1	0	0	1	0	1	0	0	2	0	5

Sheet B	1	2	3	4	5	6	7	8	9	10	Final
Shellan Reed	0	1	0	0	1	0	1	0	2	0	5
Marla Mallett	0	0	0	2	0	1	0	2	0	1	6

Sheet C	1	2	3	4	5	6	7	8	9	10	Final
Sandra Jenkins	0	1	0	1	0	0	2	1	0	1	6
Simone Groundwater	0	0	1	0	1	1	0	0	1	0	4

Sheet D	1	2	3	4	5	6	7	8	9	10	Final
Jill Winters	0	0	1	0	2	0	1	0	X	X	4
Allison MacInnes	0	1	0	3	0	2	0	3	X	X	9

== Playoffs ==
Semifinal			Final
			1	Jody Maskiewich	5
2	Allison MacInnes	6	2	Allison MacInnes	6
3	Kristen Recksiedler	4

=== Semifinal ===
Saturday, January 26, 7:30 pm

Sheet A	1	2	3	4	5	6	7	8	9	10	Final
Allison MacInnes	0	0	2	0	0	2	1	0	1	X	6
Kristen Recksiedler	0	1	0	0	2	0	0	1	0	X	4

=== Final ===
Sunday, January 27, 2:30 pm

Sheet A	1	2	3	4	5	6	7	8	9	10	Final
Jody Maskiewich	1	0	1	1	0	1	0	0	1	0	5
Allison MacInnes	0	0	0	0	2	0	1	2	0	1	6

2008 British Columbia Scotties Tournament of Hearts

Allison MacInnes
2nd British Columbia Provincial Championship title
