= 2003 British Columbia Scott Tournament of Hearts =

- Host city: North Vancouver, British Columbia
- Arena: North Shore Winter Club
- Dates: January 21–25
- Winner: Team Fister
- Curling club: Golden Ears WC, Maple Ridge
- Skip: Toni Fister
- Third: Teri Fister
- Second: Denise Byers
- Lead: Angela Strachan
- Finalist: Kelley Law

The 2003 British Columbia Scott Tournament of Hearts, the provincial women's curling championship for British Columbia, was held January 21 to 25 at the North Shore Winter Club in North Vancouver, British Columbia. The winning Toni Fister rink represented British Columbia at the 2003 Scott Tournament of Hearts in Kitchener, Ontario, finishing with a record of 4-7.

== Teams ==
The teams are listed as follows:

Skip	Third	Second	Lead	Alternate	Club(s)
Roselyn Craig	Pat Sanders	Tracey Newlands	Lorraine Gagnon	Cheryl Noble	Duncan CC, Duncan
Toni Fister	Teri Fister	Denise Byers	Angela Strachan		Golden Ears WC, Maple Ridge
Brenda Garvey	Lori Olsen	Valerie Lahucik	Kim Grimm		Kamloops CC, Kamloops
Tracey Jones	Patti Knezevic	Kay Thompson	Bridget Tansem	Barbara Boese	Prince George G&CC, Prince George
Kelley Law	Georgina Wheatcroft	Julie Skinner	Diane Dezura		Royal City CC, New Westminster
Shelley Macdonald	Lisa Jeffares	Adina Tasaka	Jacalyn Brown		Richmond CC, Richmond
Penny Shantz-Henderson	Kerrylyn Richard	Elizabeth Folk	Sandra Jenkins		Kelowna CC, Kelowna
Jan Wiltzen	Jerri-Pat Armstrong	Donna Stang	Patty Ward		Cranbrook CC, Cranbrook

== Round robin standings ==
Final Round Robin Standings

Key
Teams to Playoffs
Teams to Tiebreakers

Skip	W	L	W–L	PF	PA	EW	EL	BE	SE
Kelley Law	6	1	–	46	33	28	25	5	7
Toni Fister	4	3	2–1, 1–0	55	37	31	28	5	7
Brenda Garvey	4	3	2–1, 0–1	51	42	31	27	1	5
Roselyn Craig	4	3	1–2, 1–0	37	35	26	25	7	8
Jan Wiltzen	4	3	1–2, 0–1	47	54	32	27	5	7
Shelley Macdonald	3	4	1–0	37	37	28	28	4	11
Penny Shantz-Henderson	3	4	0–1	41	48	27	27	4	5
Tracey Jones	0	7	–	31	59	23	35	3	4

== Round robin results ==
All draw times listed in Pacific Time (UTC−08:00).

=== Draw 1 ===
Tuesday, January 21, 7:00 pm

Sheet A	1	2	3	4	5	6	7	8	9	10	Final
Jan Wiltzen	1	0	1	0	1	0	3	0	2	0	8
Kelley Law	0	2	0	1	0	5	0	1	0	0	9

Sheet B	1	2	3	4	5	6	7	8	9	10	Final
Penny Shantz-Henderson	0	0	1	0	1	0	1	0	1	0	4
Roselyn Craig	0	1	0	2	0	2	0	1	0	0	6

Sheet C	1	2	3	4	5	6	7	8	9	10	Final
Brenda Garvey	2	0	0	4	0	2	0	3	X	X	11
Tracey Jones	0	1	1	0	1	0	1	0	X	X	4

Sheet D	1	2	3	4	5	6	7	8	9	10	Final
Shelley Macdonald	0	0	1	0	0	0	1	0	X	X	2
Toni Fister	1	0	0	1	2	1	0	5	X	X	10

=== Draw 2 ===
Wednesday, January 22, 9:00 am

Sheet A	1	2	3	4	5	6	7	8	9	10	Final
Tracey Jones	2	0	0	0	1	0	1	0	X	X	4
Penny Shantz-Henderson	0	1	1	2	0	5	0	2	X	X	11

Sheet B	1	2	3	4	5	6	7	8	9	10	11	Final
Toni Fister	0	0	2	0	2	0	2	0	1	1	0	8
Jan Wiltzen	0	1	0	2	0	2	0	3	0	0	1	9

Sheet C	1	2	3	4	5	6	7	8	9	10	Final
Shelley Macdonald	0	0	1	1	1	3	1	1	X	X	8
Roselyn Craig	0	2	0	0	0	0	0	0	X	X	2

Sheet D	1	2	3	4	5	6	7	8	9	10	Final
Brenda Garvey	1	0	2	0	0	0	1	0	0	X	4
Kelley Law	0	3	0	1	1	1	0	0	1	X	7

=== Draw 3 ===
Wednesday, January 22, 2:00 pm

Sheet A	1	2	3	4	5	6	7	8	9	10	Final
Brenda Garvey	1	0	0	0	1	0	1	0	X	X	3
Toni Fister	0	2	1	1	0	3	0	1	X	X	8

Sheet B	1	2	3	4	5	6	7	8	9	10	Final
Shelley Macdonald	0	2	1	3	0	1	1	0	0	X	7
Tracey Jones	1	0	0	0	1	0	0	1	0	X	3

Sheet C	1	2	3	4	5	6	7	8	9	10	Final
Kelley Law	0	0	2	0	3	2	0	2	X	X	9
Penny Shantz-Henderson	0	0	0	1	0	0	1	0	X	X	2

Sheet D	1	2	3	4	5	6	7	8	9	10	Final
Roselyn Craig	1	0	3	1	0	2	0	4	X	X	11
Jan Wiltzen	0	1	0	0	1	0	1	0	X	X	3

=== Draw 4 ===
Wednesday, January 22, 7:30 pm

Sheet A	1	2	3	4	5	6	7	8	9	10	Final
Penny Shantz-Henderson	1	0	0	1	0	1	0	0	X	X	3
Shelley Macdonald	0	3	2	0	1	0	2	1	X	X	9

Sheet B	1	2	3	4	5	6	7	8	9	10	Final
Kelley Law	1	0	2	0	0	2	0	2	0	X	7
Toni Fister	0	1	0	0	2	0	0	0	1	X	4

Sheet C	1	2	3	4	5	6	7	8	9	10	Final
Brenda Garvey	0	2	0	3	0	0	1	3	3	X	12
Jan Wiltzen	0	0	2	0	3	1	0	0	0	X	6

Sheet D	1	2	3	4	5	6	7	8	9	10	Final
Tracey Jones	0	0	0	0	0	2	0	0	0	X	2
Roselyn Craig	1	0	0	1	1	0	1	2	0	X	6

=== Draw 5 ===
Thursday, January 23, 1:00 pm

Sheet A	1	2	3	4	5	6	7	8	9	10	Final
Jan Wiltzen	1	0	2	0	1	0	2	1	0	1	8
Tracey Jones	0	4	0	1	0	1	0	0	1	0	7

Sheet B	1	2	3	4	5	6	7	8	9	10	Final
Roselyn Craig	1	0	0	0	1	0	1	0	1	0	4
Brenda Garvey	0	1	0	1	0	2	0	2	0	1	7

Sheet C	1	2	3	4	5	6	7	8	9	10	Final
Penny Shantz-Henderson	1	1	0	1	0	1	0	2	0	1	7
Toni Fister	0	0	2	0	1	0	0	0	3	0	6

Sheet D	1	2	3	4	5	6	7	8	9	10	11	Final
Kelley Law	0	0	1	0	1	0	0	2	1	0	1	6
Shelley Macdonald	0	1	0	1	0	1	1	0	0	1	0	5

=== Draw 6 ===
Thursday, January 23, 7:00 pm

Sheet A	1	2	3	4	5	6	7	8	9	10	Final
Toni Fister	0	2	0	2	0	0	1	0	1	4	10
Roselyn Craig	1	0	1	0	1	0	0	1	0	0	4

Sheet B	1	2	3	4	5	6	7	8	9	10	Final
Tracey Jones	1	0	1	0	3	0	1	0	0	0	6
Kelley Law	0	0	0	1	0	2	0	1	1	2	7

Sheet C	1	2	3	4	5	6	7	8	9	10	Final
Jan Wiltzen	0	0	1	1	0	1	1	0	1	X	5
Shelley Macdonald	0	0	0	0	0	0	0	1	0	X	1

Sheet D	1	2	3	4	5	6	7	8	9	10	Final
Penny Shantz-Henderson	1	0	0	2	0	0	3	0	0	2	8
Brenda Garvey	0	0	1	0	4	0	0	1	0	0	6

=== Draw 7 ===
Friday, January 24, 9:00 am

Sheet A	1	2	3	4	5	6	7	8	9	10	Final
Shelley Macdonald	1	0	1	0	2	0	0	0	1	0	5
Brenda Garvey	0	1	0	1	0	2	1	2	0	1	8

Sheet B	1	2	3	4	5	6	7	8	9	10	11	Final
Jan Wiltzen	0	0	1	0	2	1	0	0	2	0	2	8
Penny Shantz-Henderson	0	0	0	0	0	0	3	2	0	1	0	6

Sheet C	1	2	3	4	5	6	7	8	9	10	Final
Roselyn Craig	1	0	0	0	0	0	0	2	1	X	4
Kelley Law	0	1	0	0	0	0	0	0	0	X	1

Sheet D	1	2	3	4	5	6	7	8	9	10	Final
Toni Fister	2	0	0	2	0	2	1	0	2	X	9
Tracey Jones	0	1	1	0	2	0	0	1	0	X	5

== Tiebreakers ==
Tiebreaker #1		Tiebreaker #2
		Brenda Garvey	7
Roselyn Craig	4	Jan Wiltzen	4
Jan Wiltzen	8

=== Tiebreaker #1 ===
Friday, January 24, 2:00 pm

Sheet A	1	2	3	4	5	6	7	8	9	10	Final
Jan Wiltzen	1	0	2	0	1	0	2	1	1	X	8
Roselyn Craig	0	1	0	2	0	1	0	0	0	X	4

=== Tiebreaker #2 ===
Friday, January 24, 7:30 pm

Sheet B	1	2	3	4	5	6	7	8	9	10	Final
Jan Wiltzen	0	1	0	1	1	0	0	1	0	0	4
Brenda Garvey	1	0	1	0	0	1	1	0	2	1	7

== Playoffs ==
Semifinal			Final
			1	Kelley Law
2	Toni Fister	9	2	Toni Fister
3	Brenda Garvey	6

=== Semifinal ===
Saturday, January 25, 9:00 am

Sheet C	1	2	3	4	5	6	7	8	9	10	Final
Brenda Garvey	0	0	2	1	1	0	2	0	0	0	6
Toni Fister	0	2	0	0	0	1	0	3	2	1	9

=== Final ===
Saturday, January 25, 2:00 pm

Sheet B	1	2	3	4	5	6	7	8	9	10	Final
Toni Fister	0	2	0	1	0	1	1	0	3	X	8
Kelley Law	1	0	2	0	1	0	0	2	0	X	6

2003 British Columbia Scott Tournament of Hearts

Toni Fister
1st British Columbia Provincial Championship title
