= List of curling clubs in British Columbia =

This is a list of curling clubs in the Canadian province of British Columbia. Curling in British Columbia is organized by the Curl BC. Curl BC divides the province into 8 zones:

== Zone 1 (Kootenays) ==
- Beaver Valley Curling Club – Fruitvale
- Castlegar Curling Club – Castlegar
- Cranbrook Curling Centre – Cranbrook
- Creston Curling Club – Creston
- Elkford Curling Club – Elkford
- Fernie Curling Club – Fernie
- Golden Curling Club – Golden
- Grand Forks Curling Club – Grand Forks
- Invermere Curling Club – Invermere
- Kimberley Curling Club – Kimberley
- Riondel Curling Club – Riondel
- Rossland Curling Club - Rossland
- Salmo Valley Curling Club – Salmo
- Sparwood Curling Club – Sparwood
- Trail Curling Association – Trail

== Zone 2 (Thompson-Okanagan) ==
- Armstrong Curling Club – Armstrong
- Ashcroft Curling Club – Ashcroft
- Barriere Curling Club – Barriere
- Clinton Curling Club - Clinton
- Enderby & District Curling Centre – Enderby
- Falkland Curling Club - Falkland
- Kamloops Curling Club – Kamloops
- Kelowna Curling Club – Kelowna
- Lillooet Curling Club – Lillooet
- Logan Lake Curling Club - Logan Lake
- Lumby Curling Club – Lumby
- Merritt Curling Centre – Merritt
- Oliver Curling Club – Oliver
- Osoyoos International Curling Club – Osoyoos
- Penticton Curling Club – Penticton
- Princeton Curling Club – Princeton
- Revelstoke Curling Club – Revelstoke
- Salmon Arm Curling Club – Salmon Arm
- Summerland Curling Club – Summerland
- Vernon Curling Club – Vernon
- Wells Gray Curling Club – Clearwater
- Winfield Curling Club – Winfield

== Zone 3 (Fraser Valley) ==
- Abbotsford Curling Club – Abbotsford
- Chilliwack Curling Club – Chilliwack
- Golden Ears Winter Club – Maple Ridge
- Hope Curling Club – Hope
- Langley Curling Centre – Langley
- Mission Granite Curling Club – Mission

== Zone 4 (Fraser River) ==
- Cloverdale Curling Club – Cloverdale
- Peace Arch Curling Centre – White Rock
- Port Moody Curling Club – Port Moody
- Royal City Curling Club – New Westminster

== Zone 5 (Vancouver Coastal) ==
- Delta Thistle Curling Club – Delta
- Gibsons Curling Club – Gibsons
- Howe Sound Curling Club – Squamish
- Marpole Curling Club – Vancouver
- Richmond Curling Centre – Richmond
- Tunnel Town Curling Club – Tsawwassen
- Vancouver Curling Club – Vancouver

== Zone 6 (Vancouver Island-Central Coast) ==
- Alberni Valley Curling Club – Port Alberni
- Campbell River Curling Club – Campbell River
- Comox Valley Curling Club – Courtenay
- Cowichan Rocks Club – Lake Cowichan
- Duncan Curling Club – Duncan
- Esquimalt Curling Club – Esquimalt
- Fort Rupert Curling Club – Port Hardy
- Kerry Park Curling Centre – Mill Bay
- Nanaimo Curling Centre – Nanaimo
- Parksville Curling Club – Parksville
- Powell River Curling Club – Powell River
- Qualicum & District Curling Club – Qualicum Beach
- Victoria Curling Centre – Victoria

== Zone 7 (Northwest) ==
- Atlin Curling Club - Atlin
- Fraser Lake Curling Club – Fraser Lake
- Hirsch Creek Golf and Winter Club – Kitimat
- Houston Curling Club – Houston
- Prince Rupert Curling Club – Prince Rupert
- Quesnel Curling Centre – Quesnel
- Smithers Curling Club – Smithers
- Terrace Curling Club – Terrace

== Zone 8 (Cariboo-North East) ==
- 100 Mile House Curling Club – 100 Mile House
- Bullhead Mountain Curling Club – Hudson's Hope
- Chetwynd Curling Club – Chetwynd
- Curl Mackenzie – Mackenzie
- Dawson Creek Curling Club – Dawson Creek
- Fort Nelson Curling Club – Fort Nelson
- Fort St. John Curling Club – Fort St. John
- Prince George Golf & Curling Club – Prince George
- Taylor Curling Club – Taylor
- Tumbler Ridge Curling Club – Tumbler Ridge
- Wells Curling Club – Wells
- Williams Lake Curling Club – Williams Lake
