= 2004 British Columbia Scott Tournament of Hearts =

- Host city: Maple Ridge, British Columbia
- Arena: Golden Ears Winter Club
- Dates: January 20–24
- Winner: Team Wheatcroft
- Curling club: Royal City CC, New Westminster
- Skip: Georgina Wheatcroft
- Third: Diane McLean
- Second: Shellan Reed
- Lead: Julie Skinner
- Finalist: Kelly Scott

The 2004 British Columbia Scott Tournament of Hearts, the provincial women's curling championship for British Columbia, was held January 20 to 24 at the Golden Ears Winter Club in Maple Ridge, British Columbia. The winning Georgina Wheatcroft rink represented British Columbia at the 2004 Scott Tournament of Hearts in Red Deer, Alberta, finishing with a record of 4–7.

== Teams ==
The teams were listed as follows:

Skip	Third	Second	Lead	Club(s)
Roselyn Craig	Pat Sanders	Tracey Newlands	Cheryl Noble	Duncan CC, Duncan
Toni Fister	Teri Fister	Denise Sellers	Angela Strachan	Golden Ears WC, Maple Ridge
Patti Knezevic	Tracey Jones	Kay Thompson	Melinda Kotsch	Prince George G&CC, Prince George
Cory McLaughlin	Renee Duplisse	Rhonda Stoner	Heather Osachoff	Richmond CC, Richmond
Kelly Scott	Jeanna Schraeder	Sasha Bergner	Renee Simons	Kelowna CC, Kelowna
LeeAnne Ursel	Deanna Tuokko	Alyson Thornson	Denise Reimer	Kelowna CC, Kelowna
Georgina Wheatcroft	Diane McLean	Shellan Reed	Julie Skinner	Royal City CC, New Westminster
Jan Wiltzen	Jerri-Pat Armstrong	Donna Stang	Patty Ward	Cranbrook CC, Cranbrook

== Round robin standings ==
Final Round Robin Standings

Key
Teams to Playoffs

Skip	W	L	W–L	PF	PA	EW	EL	BE	SE
Georgina Wheatcroft	5	2	2–0	54	29	31	20	8	11
Kelly Scott	5	2	1–1	47	35	32	28	9	4
Cory McLaughlin	5	2	0–2	36	38	30	26	9	6
Jan Wiltzen	4	3	–	42	42	27	25	9	6
Roselyn Craig	3	4	1–0	37	38	28	23	15	5
Toni Fister	3	4	0–1	40	45	21	29	7	1
LeeAnne Ursel	2	5	–	38	53	24	32	9	4
Patti Knezevic	1	6	–	33	52	26	32	5	4

== Round robin results ==
All draw times listed in Pacific Time (UTC−08:00).

=== Draw 1 ===
Tuesday, January 20, 7:00 pm

Sheet A	1	2	3	4	5	6	7	8	9	10	Final
Cory McLaughlin	0	1	0	1	0	1	0	0	2	1	6
Jan Wiltzen	0	0	1	0	1	0	1	1	0	0	4

Sheet B	1	2	3	4	5	6	7	8	9	10	Final
Toni Fister	1	0	1	0	1	0	0	0	0	X	3
Kelly Scott	0	1	0	2	0	1	1	2	0	X	7

Sheet C	1	2	3	4	5	6	7	8	9	10	Final
Georgina Wheatcroft	0	1	1	1	0	1	3	0	1	0	8
LeeAnne Ursel	3	0	0	0	3	0	0	1	0	2	9

Sheet D	1	2	3	4	5	6	7	8	9	10	Final
Roselyn Craig	0	1	0	0	0	0	2	0	2	0	5
Patti Knezevic	0	0	0	0	1	2	0	2	0	1	6

=== Draw 2 ===
Wednesday, January 21, 9:00 am

Sheet A	1	2	3	4	5	6	7	8	9	10	Final
Roselyn Craig	0	1	0	1	0	1	0	1	0	0	4
Kelly Scott	0	0	1	0	2	0	2	0	1	2	8

Sheet B	1	2	3	4	5	6	7	8	9	10	Final
Jan Wiltzen	0	0	0	0	1	0	1	0	0	X	2
Georgina Wheatcroft	0	0	0	1	0	1	0	3	1	X	6

Sheet C	1	2	3	4	5	6	7	8	9	10	Final
Patti Knezevic	0	0	2	0	2	0	1	1	0	X	6
Toni Fister	1	3	0	1	0	1	0	0	2	X	8

Sheet D	1	2	3	4	5	6	7	8	9	10	11	Final
Cory McLaughlin	1	0	1	0	1	0	0	3	0	0	1	7
LeeAnne Ursel	0	0	0	1	0	1	2	0	1	1	0	6

=== Draw 3 ===
Wednesday, January 21, 2:00 pm

Sheet A	1	2	3	4	5	6	7	8	9	10	Final
Jan Wiltzen	1	0	1	0	0	1	0	1	1	X	5
Patti Knezevic	0	0	0	1	1	0	1	0	0	X	3

Sheet B	1	2	3	4	5	6	7	8	9	10	Final
LeeAnne Ursel	2	0	1	0	1	0	0	2	0	0	6
Toni Fister	0	2	0	2	0	1	0	0	0	2	7

Sheet C	1	2	3	4	5	6	7	8	9	10	Final
Cory McLaughlin	0	1	0	0	0	0	1	1	0	1	4
Roselyn Craig	0	0	0	0	1	0	0	0	2	0	3

Sheet D	1	2	3	4	5	6	7	8	9	10	Final
Georgina Wheatcroft	0	2	0	1	0	2	0	2	0	1	8
Kelly Scott	1	0	0	0	2	0	1	0	2	0	6

=== Draw 4 ===
Wednesday, January 21, 7:30 pm

Sheet A	1	2	3	4	5	6	7	8	9	10	Final
Georgina Wheatcroft	2	2	5	1	X	X	X	X	X	X	10
Toni Fister	0	0	0	0	X	X	X	X	X	X	0

Sheet B	1	2	3	4	5	6	7	8	9	10	Final
Cory McLaughlin	2	0	1	0	1	0	5	1	X	X	10
Patti Knezevic	0	2	0	2	0	1	0	0	X	X	5

Sheet C	1	2	3	4	5	6	7	8	9	10	Final
LeeAnne Ursel	0	0	0	2	0	1	0	0	1	0	4
Kelly Scott	0	0	0	0	1	0	1	2	0	1	5

Sheet D	1	2	3	4	5	6	7	8	9	10	Final
Jan Wiltzen	2	0	1	0	0	0	1	1	3	X	8
Roselyn Craig	0	1	0	1	2	0	0	0	0	X	4

=== Draw 5 ===
Thursday, January 22, 1:00 pm

Sheet A	1	2	3	4	5	6	7	8	9	10	Final
Kelly Scott	1	0	2	0	3	0	1	0	0	1	8
Cory McLaughlin	0	1	0	1	0	1	0	0	1	0	4

Sheet B	1	2	3	4	5	6	7	8	9	10	Final
Roselyn Craig	1	1	0	4	1	2	X	X	X	X	9
LeeAnne Ursel	0	0	2	0	0	0	X	X	X	X	2

Sheet C	1	2	3	4	5	6	7	8	9	10	Final
Toni Fister	3	0	4	0	5	X	X	X	X	X	12
Jan Wiltzen	0	2	0	1	0	X	X	X	X	X	3

Sheet D	1	2	3	4	5	6	7	8	9	10	Final
Patti Knezevic	2	0	1	0	1	0	0	1	0	X	5
Georgina Wheatcroft	0	1	0	1	0	2	2	0	3	X	9

=== Draw 6 ===
Thursday, January 22, 7:00 pm

Sheet A	1	2	3	4	5	6	7	8	9	10	Final
Patti Knezevic	0	0	0	2	0	0	0	1	1	0	4
LeeAnne Ursel	1	0	0	0	3	1	1	0	0	0	6

Sheet B	1	2	3	4	5	6	7	8	9	10	Final
Kelly Scott	2	0	2	0	1	0	0	0	1	0	6
Jan Wiltzen	0	1	0	1	0	3	0	0	0	2	7

Sheet C	1	2	3	4	5	6	7	8	9	10	11	Final
Roselyn Craig	2	0	0	1	0	0	0	1	0	0	1	5
Georgina Wheatcroft	0	2	1	0	1	0	0	0	0	0	0	4

Sheet D	1	2	3	4	5	6	7	8	9	10	Final
Toni Fister	1	0	0	1	0	0	0	1	0	0	3
Cory McLaughlin	0	0	1	0	1	1	0	0	1	1	5

=== Draw 7 ===
Friday, January 23, 9:00 am

Sheet A	1	2	3	4	5	6	7	8	9	10	Final
Toni Fister	4	0	0	2	0	0	1	0	0	0	7
Roselyn Craig	0	0	1	0	2	1	0	0	1	3	8

Sheet B	1	2	3	4	5	6	7	8	9	10	Final
Georgina Wheatcroft	3	1	0	2	0	3	X	X	X	X	9
Cory McLaughlin	0	0	2	0	1	0	X	X	X	X	3

Sheet C	1	2	3	4	5	6	7	8	9	10	Final
Kelly Scott	1	0	2	0	2	0	2	0	1	0	8
Patti Knezevic	0	1	0	1	0	1	0	1	0	1	5

Sheet D	1	2	3	4	5	6	7	8	9	10	Final
LeeAnne Ursel	2	0	2	0	1	0	0	0	0	X	5
Jan Wiltzen	0	3	0	3	0	1	1	0	5	X	13

== Playoffs ==
Semifinal			Final
			1	Georgina Wheatcroft	7
2	Kelly Scott	7	2	Kelly Scott	5
3	Cory McLaughlin	4

=== Semifinal ===
Friday, January 23, 7:30 pm

Sheet A	1	2	3	4	5	6	7	8	9	10	Final
Kelly Scott	2	1	0	0	2	0	0	1	0	1	7
Cory McLaughlin	0	0	1	1	0	0	1	0	1	0	4

=== Final ===
Saturday, January 24, 2:00 pm

Sheet A	1	2	3	4	5	6	7	8	9	10	11	Final
Kelly Scott	0	0	0	2	0	1	0	0	0	2	0	5
Georgina Wheatcroft	0	0	1	0	1	0	0	1	2	0	2	7

2004 British Columbia Scott Tournament of Hearts

Georgina Wheatcroft
6th British Columbia Provincial Championship title
