= 2023 BC Men's Curling Championship =

- Host city: Chilliwack, British Columbia
- Arena: Chilliwack Curling Club
- Dates: January 11–15
- Winner: Team Gauthier
- Curling club: Victoria CC, Victoria
- Skip: Jacques Gauthier
- Third: Sterling Middleton
- Second: Jason Ginter
- Lead: Alex Horvath
- Coach: Bryan Miki
- Finalist: Brent Pierce

The 2023 BC Men's Curling Championship, the provincial men's curling championship for British Columbia, was held from January 11 to 15 at the Chilliwack Curling Club in Chilliwack, British Columbia. The event was held in conjunction with the 2023 British Columbia Scotties Tournament of Hearts, the provincial women's curling championship.

The winning Jacques Gauthier rink represented British Columbia at the 2023 Tim Hortons Brier in London, Ontario where they finished fifth in Pool B with a 3–5 record.

== Qualification process ==
Qualification method	Berths	Qualifying team(s)
Defending Champion	1	Brent Pierce
CTRS Leaders	3	Jacques Gauthier; Paul Cseke; Sébastien Robillard
BC Curling Tour	3	Cameron de Jong; Cody Tanaka; Sean Geall
Open Qualifier	5	Jason Montgomery; Chris Medford; Dean Joanisse; Jim Cotter; Adam Fenton

== Teams ==
The teams are listed as follows:

Skip	Third	Second	Lead	Alternate	Club(s)
Jim Cotter	Grant Olsen	Andrew Nerpin	Rick Sawatsky	Tyrel Griffith	Vernon CC / Kelowna CC / Kamloops CC
Paul Cseke	Corey Chester	Jay Wakefield	Ty Russell	John Cullen	Victoria CC
Cameron de Jong	Matt Tolley	Erik Colwell	John Slattery	Logan Miron	Victoria CC / Penticton CC / Vernon CC
Adam Fenton	Alex Duncan-Wu	Chris Parkinson	Matthew Fenton	Brad Fenton	Royal City CC / Comox Valley CC
Jacques Gauthier	Sterling Middleton	Jason Ginter	Alex Horvath		Victoria CC
Sean Geall	Brad Wood	Mitchell Kopytko	Darin Gerow		Salmon Arm CC / Penticton CC / Kamloops CC
Dean Joanisse	Brendan Willis	Neil Cursons	Grant Dezura		Golden Ears WC
Chris Medford	Steve Tersmette	Mitch Young	Blair Jarvis		Kimberley CC / Cranbrook CC
Jason Montgomery	Chris Baier	Miles Craig	William Duggan		Victoria CC
Brent Pierce	Jeff Richard	Jared Kolomaya	Nicholas Meister		Royal City CC
Sébastien Robillard	Daniel Wenzek	Richard Krell	Nathan Small		Royal City CC / Nelson CC
Cody Tanaka	Josh Miki	Nicholas Umbach	Connor Kent	Matthew McCrady	Royal City CC / Richmond CC

== Knockout brackets ==
=== A event ===
First Knockout	Qualifier 1
Brent Pierce	7
Jason Montgomery	7	Jason Montgomery	5
Dean Joanisse	4	Brent Pierce	10
Sébastien Robillard	5
Sébastien Robillard	8
Cameron de Jong	8	Cameron de Jong	5
Adam Fenton	6	Brent Pierce	8
Jacques Gauthier	9
Paul Cseke	4
Cody Tanaka	4	Jim Cotter	10
Jim Cotter	5	Jim Cotter	2
Jacques Gauthier	6
Jacques Gauthier	7
Sean Geall	7	Chris Medford	4
Chris Medford	8

=== B event ===
Second Knockout	Qualifier 2
Sébastien Robillard	7
Dean Joanisse	7	Dean Joanisse	3
Chris Medford	5	Sébastien Robillard	6
Jim Cotter	7
Jim Cotter	11
Adam Fenton	2	Paul Cseke	7
Paul Cseke	8	Jim Cotter	9
Brent Pierce	8
Brent Pierce	7
Cody Tanaka	7	Cody Tanaka	6
Cameron de Jong	2	Cody Tanaka	6
Sean Geall	7	Jason Montgomery	5
Jason Montgomery	8

=== C event ===
Second Knockout				Qualifier 3
		Cody Tanaka	10
Chris Medford	2	Sean Geall	7
Sean Geall	7			Cody Tanaka	9
				Sébastien Robillard	4
		Jason Montgomery	3
		Sébastien Robillard	10

Second Knockout				Qualifier 4
Adam Fenton	8
Paul Cseke	7	Adam Fenton	6
Cameron de Jong	7	Cameron de Jong	9
Dean Joanisse	6			Cameron de Jong	5
				Brent Pierce	10

== Knockout results ==
All draw times listed in Pacific Time (UTC−08:00).

=== Draw 2 ===
Wednesday, January 11, 2:00 pm

Sheet B	1	2	3	4	5	6	7	8	9	10	Final
Jason Montgomery	1	0	1	0	0	1	3	0	1	X	7
Dean Joanisse	0	1	0	0	1	0	0	2	0	X	4

Sheet C	1	2	3	4	5	6	7	8	9	10	Final
Cameron de Jong	0	0	3	0	1	3	0	0	0	1	8
Adam Fenton	0	0	0	2	0	0	0	3	1	0	6

Sheet D	1	2	3	4	5	6	7	8	9	10	Final
Cody Tanaka	0	2	0	0	1	1	0	0	0	0	4
Jim Cotter	0	0	1	1	0	0	1	0	1	1	5

Sheet F	1	2	3	4	5	6	7	8	9	10	11	Final
Sean Geall	2	2	0	1	0	2	0	0	0	0	0	7
Chris Medford	0	0	1	0	1	0	3	0	1	1	1	8

=== Draw 3 ===
Wednesday, January 11, 7:00 pm

Sheet B	1	2	3	4	5	6	7	8	9	10	Final
Sébastien Robillard	1	0	0	0	3	0	2	1	1	X	8
Cameron de Jong	0	2	1	1	0	1	0	0	0	X	5

Sheet C	1	2	3	4	5	6	7	8	9	10	11	Final
Brent Pierce	0	0	0	2	0	1	0	0	2	0	2	7
Jason Montgomery	1	0	1	0	1	0	0	1	0	1	0	5

Sheet D	1	2	3	4	5	6	7	8	9	10	Final
Jacques Gauthier	1	0	1	0	2	0	1	0	2	X	7
Chris Medford	0	1	0	1	0	1	0	1	0	X	4

Sheet F	1	2	3	4	5	6	7	8	9	10	Final
Paul Cseke	2	1	0	0	0	0	0	1	0	X	4
Jim Cotter	0	0	1	0	1	2	3	0	3	X	10

=== Draw 4 ===
Thursday, January 12, 9:00 am

Sheet A	1	2	3	4	5	6	7	8	9	10	Final
Dean Joanisse	0	0	2	0	2	0	0	2	0	1	7
Chris Medford	0	1	0	1	0	0	1	0	2	0	5

Sheet B	1	2	3	4	5	6	7	8	9	10	Final
Jim Cotter	0	0	0	1	0	0	0	1	X	X	2
Jacques Gauthier	0	1	0	0	2	1	2	0	X	X	6

Sheet E	1	2	3	4	5	6	7	8	9	10	Final
Brent Pierce	0	2	1	0	1	1	0	3	2	X	10
Sébastien Robillard	1	0	0	1	0	0	3	0	0	X	5

Sheet F	1	2	3	4	5	6	7	8	9	10	Final
Adam Fenton	0	0	0	1	0	0	1	0	X	X	2
Paul Cseke	0	2	1	0	1	1	0	3	X	X	8

=== Draw 5 ===
Thursday, January 12, 2:00 pm

Sheet A	1	2	3	4	5	6	7	8	9	10	Final
Jim Cotter	0	0	4	0	3	0	0	2	0	2	11
Paul Cseke	1	1	0	1	0	1	1	0	2	0	7

Sheet D	1	2	3	4	5	6	7	8	9	10	Final
Sean Geall	0	1	0	0	3	0	3	0	0	0	7
Jason Montgomery	1	0	1	0	0	1	0	1	2	2	8

Sheet E	1	2	3	4	5	6	7	8	9	10	Final
Cody Tanaka	0	2	0	2	0	1	0	2	X	X	7
Cameron de Jong	0	0	1	0	0	0	1	0	X	X	2

Sheet F	1	2	3	4	5	6	7	8	9	10	Final
Sébastien Robillard	0	2	0	0	3	2	0	X	X	X	7
Dean Joanisse	0	0	0	1	0	0	2	X	X	X	3

=== Draw 6 ===
Thursday, January 12, 7:00 pm

Sheet C	1	2	3	4	5	6	7	8	9	10	Final
Cody Tanaka	0	0	0	2	1	1	0	1	0	1	6
Jason Montgomery	2	0	2	0	0	0	1	0	0	0	5

Sheet D	1	2	3	4	5	6	7	8	9	10	11	Final
Brent Pierce	0	2	1	0	2	0	1	0	2	0	0	8
Jacques Gauthier	2	0	0	2	0	1	0	1	0	2	1	9

Sheet E	1	2	3	4	5	6	7	8	9	10	Final
Chris Medford	0	0	0	0	1	0	1	X	X	X	2
Sean Geall	1	0	2	2	0	2	0	X	X	X	7

=== Draw 7 ===
Friday, January 13, 9:00 am

Sheet B	1	2	3	4	5	6	7	8	9	10	11	Final
Brent Pierce	0	0	2	0	2	0	0	1	1	0	1	7
Cody Tanaka	1	1	0	1	0	1	0	0	0	2	0	6

Sheet C	1	2	3	4	5	6	7	8	9	10	11	Final
Cameron de Jong	0	0	2	0	2	0	2	0	0	0	1	7
Dean Joanisse	1	0	0	1	0	1	0	1	1	1	0	6

Sheet D	1	2	3	4	5	6	7	8	9	10	Final
Sébastien Robillard	0	0	1	1	0	2	0	0	1	1	6
Jim Cotter	2	2	0	0	1	0	0	2	0	0	7

Sheet F	1	2	3	4	5	6	7	8	9	10	11	Final
Adam Fenton	0	2	0	1	0	1	1	0	2	0	1	8
Paul Cseke	2	0	0	0	1	0	0	1	0	3	0	7

=== Draw 8 ===
Friday, January 13, 2:00 pm

Sheet A	1	2	3	4	5	6	7	8	9	10	Final
Jason Montgomery	1	0	0	0	1	1	0	0	0	X	3
Sébastien Robillard	0	0	0	3	0	0	3	2	2	X	10

Sheet B	1	2	3	4	5	6	7	8	9	10	Final
Sean Geall	2	0	1	0	3	0	0	1	0	0	7
Cody Tanaka	0	1	0	2	0	2	1	0	2	2	10

Sheet C	1	2	3	4	5	6	7	8	9	10	Final
Adam Fenton	0	1	1	0	1	0	2	1	0	X	6
Cameron de Jong	2	0	0	2	0	1	0	0	4	X	9

Sheet D	1	2	3	4	5	6	7	8	9	10	11	Final
Jim Cotter	0	2	1	1	0	1	0	3	0	0	1	9
Brent Pierce	3	0	0	0	1	0	1	0	2	1	0	8

=== Draw 9 ===
Friday, January 13, 7:00 pm

Sheet C	1	2	3	4	5	6	7	8	9	10	Final
Cody Tanaka	2	1	1	0	2	1	0	2	X	X	9
Sébastien Robillard	0	0	0	2	0	0	2	0	X	X	4

Sheet E	1	2	3	4	5	6	7	8	9	10	Final
Cameron de Jong	0	1	0	3	0	0	1	0	0	X	5
Brent Pierce	0	0	5	0	1	1	0	0	3	X	10

== Playoffs ==
Page playoff system
A	Jacques Gauthier	8
B	Jim Cotter	3
C1	Cody Tanaka	9
C2	Brent Pierce	11

Semifinal
B	Jim Cotter	8
C2	Brent Pierce	9

Final
A	Jacques Gauthier	8
C2	Brent Pierce	5

=== A vs. B ===
Saturday, January 14, 9:00 am

Sheet D	1	2	3	4	5	6	7	8	9	10	Final
Jacques Gauthier	1	0	1	0	1	1	0	3	1	X	8
Jim Cotter	0	1	0	1	0	0	1	0	0	X	3

=== C1 vs. C2 ===
Saturday, January 14, 9:00 am

Sheet F	1	2	3	4	5	6	7	8	9	10	11	Final
Cody Tanaka	0	0	2	0	2	0	2	0	3	0	0	9
Brent Pierce	2	1	0	2	0	1	0	1	0	2	2	11

=== Semifinal ===
Saturday, January 14, 7:00 pm

Sheet D	1	2	3	4	5	6	7	8	9	10	Final
Jim Cotter	2	0	1	0	2	0	1	0	2	0	8
Brent Pierce	0	1	0	2	0	2	0	1	0	3	9

=== Final ===
Sunday, January 15, 2:00 pm

Sheet D	1	2	3	4	5	6	7	8	9	10	Final
Jacques Gauthier	2	0	0	1	0	2	0	0	3	X	8
Brent Pierce	0	1	0	0	2	0	1	1	0	X	5

2023 BC Men's Curling Championship

Jacques Gauthier
1st British Columbia Provincial Championship title
