= Pacific International Cup =

- Established: 1999
- Host city: Richmond, British Columbia
- Arena: Richmond Curling Centre

Current champions (2019)
- Men: (British Columbia) Ron Schmidt, Comox Valley CC
- Women: Peggy Dorosz, Yukon

The Pacific International Cup (PIC) is an international bonspiel held annually in April at the Richmond Curling Club in Richmond, British Columbia. The objective of the PIC is to promote and develop curling at a grass-roots level both in British Columbia and internationally by providing club teams an opportunity to play in a premier international tournament. Over the years teams from 23 different countries and US states have participated in the bonspiel, including from China, Chinese Taipei, South Korea, Japan, Australia, New Zealand, Brazil, and Singapore.

The PIC invites 16 men's teams and 16 women's teams, 13 each from outside of British Columbia (Yukon and international) and the top 3 teams from the BC Club Challenge Championship.

== History ==
Originally called the Pacific Club Challenge, the inaugural event was held in 1999 at the Royal City Curling Club in New Westminster, British Columbia. At that time it was only open to the men's club champions from the Lower Mainlands division of the Pacific Coast Curling Association (one of the precursors to the current Curl BC association). Over time the club challenge was opened to all of the Pacific Coast Curling Association (and subsequently Curl BC) and acted as a provincial club championship. In 2019 the BC Club Challenge became a separate event where club champions from each curling club in the province have a chance to become provincial club champion and represent British Columbia at the national Travelers Curling Club Championship. The top 3 men's and women's teams in the BC Club Challenge Championship gain entry into the Pacific International Cup.

In 2000 the bonspiel expanded to include international and Yukon teams and in 2004 added a women's division. From 2012 to 2018 both men's and women's had two pools, the international pool and the British Columbia pool which acted as the provincial club challenge championship. The winners of each pool would then play each other to become the men's and women's overall PIC champions.

In March, 2019 Curling Canada honoured the organizers of the Pacific International Cup with the prestigious Award of Achievement in recognition of the event's impact on curling.

The 2020 PIC was cancelled due to the COVID-19 pandemic.

== Champions ==
Men's Champions
Year	Winning team	Winning team's Club/Locale
2000	Fred Puetz, Ian Turner, Marc Fillion, Dennis Robertson	(British Columbia) Salmon Arm CC, Salmon Arm, BC
2001	Cal Fister, Murray Day, Scott Gregory, Cary Blackburn	(British Columbia) Golden Ears CC, Maple Ridge, BC
2002	Jared Wannamaker, Kevan Penonzek, Ken Johnson, Cameron Johnston, Dwayne Clegg	(British Columbia) Gibsons CC, Gibsons, BC
2003	Brian Gessner, Tom Lutes, Lawrence Layton, Jim Graham	(British Columbia) Vancouver CC, Vancouver, BC
2004	Bob Chlan, Jeff MacPheat, Harold Levesque, Duke Lecuyer, Bert Levesque	(British Columbia) Nanaimo CC, Nanaimo, BC
2005	Gerald Poelman, Randy Thiessen, Craig Burton, Jim Machell, Stuart Procter	(British Columbia) Duncan CC, Duncan, BC
2006	Cal Fister, Cary Blackburn, Brent Kupser, Don Wakefield	(British Columbia) Golden Ears CC, Maple Ridge, BC
2007	Stu Harris, Dean Lunn, Don Nahnybida, Mario Pimentel	(British Columbia) Valley CC
2008	Cal Fister, Garth Moore, Murray Day, Brian Williams	(British Columbia) Golden Ears CC, Maple Ridge, BC
2009	Kevin Geistlinger, Darin Heath, Kevin Pickering, Dan Colton	(British Columbia) Vernon CC, Vernon, BC
2010	Stu Harris, Dean Lunn, Todd O'Dell, Bob Crocker	(British Columbia) Cloverdale CC, Cloverdale, BC
2011	Dwight Hodder, Paul Quesnel, Gary Farr, Cheyne Hodder	(British Columbia) Ashcroft CC, Ashcroft, BC
2012	Randie Shen, Brendon Liu, Nick Hsu, Steve Koo, Ken Chung	Chinese Taipei
2013	Blaine Black, Shaun Everest, Doug McCrae, Kim Dixon	(British Columbia) Penticton CC, Penticton, BC
2014	Darren Frycz, Steve Claxton, Don Monk, Bill Nickerson	(British Columbia) Langley CC, Langley, BC
2015	Kevin Britz, Ken Britz, James Crawford, Darren Jarvis	(British Columbia) Chilliwack CC, Chilliwack, BC
2016	Ron Schmidt, Norm Coté, Craig Bernes, Darren Richards	(British Columbia) Comox Valley CC, Courtenay, BC
2017	John Shoesmith, Andrew Ernst, Ed Strachan, John Harrison	(Washington (state)) Washington, USA
2018	Vic Shimizu, Cody Tanaka, Trevor Bakken, Mark Yodogawa	(British Columbia) Richmond CC, Richmond, BC
2019	Ron Schmidt, Norm Coté, Mike Meeres, Darren Richards	(British Columbia) Comox Valley CC, Courtenay, BC
2020	Cancelled	

Women's Champions
Year	Winning team	Winning team's Club/Locale
2004	Leanne Andrews, Jennifer Gay, Susan Milum, Carolyn Brand	(British Columbia) Valley CC
2005	Nancy Richard, Clare Cloutier, Leslie Frosch, Doreen Deaver, Miyo Konno	(Washington (state)) Washington, USA
2006	Bingyu Wang, Qingshuang Yue, Yin Liu, Yan Zhou, Yue Sun	China
2007	Shellan Reed, Dianne Gauthier, Cynthia Parton, Deanna Kersey	(British Columbia) Royal City CC, New Westminster, BC
2008	Marilou Richter, Marnie Jepsen, Debbie Jones-Walker, Dianne Gauthier, Sandra Comadina	(British Columbia) Royal City CC, New Westminster, BC
2009	Lil Blashko, Cindy Curtain, Sandy Heath, Tammy Brennan	(British Columbia) Penticton CC, Penticton, BC
2010	Cory McLaughlin, Corri Roberts, Danielle Callens, Crystal Murray	(British Columbia) Cloverdale CC, Cloverdale, BC
2011	Deb Goodwin, Lonnie Schopp, Kim Jonsson, Lori Ross	(British Columbia) Comox Valley CC, Courtenay, BC
2012	Deb Goodwin, Lonnie Schopp, Kim Jonsson, Lori Ross	(British Columbia) Comox Valley CC, Courtenay, BC
2013	Amy Gibson, Rebecca Turley, Carman Cheng, Michelle Dunn	(British Columbia) Vancouver CC, Vancouver, BC
2014	Cathy Shuttleworth, Vicky Persinger, Catharine Persinger, Adie Callahan	Alaska, USA
2015	Leanne Andrews, Jenn Gay, Kim Mclandress, Philippa Johnston	(British Columbia) Cloverdale CC, Cloverdale, BC
2016	Cora Farrell, Kelly Snider, Erica Blake, Karen Spaleta	Alaska, USA
2017	Kim Dennis, Heather Beatty, Dawn Mesana, Jenn Gauthier	(British Columbia) Richmond CC, Richmond, BC
2018	Lori Olsen, Kelsey Martin, Lisa Robitaille, Andrea Bourassa	(British Columbia) McArthur Island CC, Kamloops, BC
2019	Peggy Dorosz, Laini Klassen, Kandice Braga, Inge Brown	Yukon
2020	Cancelled	
