= Shannon Joanisse =

Canadian curler

- Curler
- Born: Shannon Wilson; September 28, 1976 (age 50); Wawota, Saskatchewan, Canada

Team
- Skip: Kristen Ryan
- Third: Shannon Joanisse
- Second: Megan Yamamoto
- Lead: Kirsten Fox

Curling career
- Member Association: Saskatchewan (1994–2003); Ontario (2003–2005); Alberta (2005–2006; 2012–2014); British Columbia (2006–2012; 2014–present)
- Hearts: 5 (1999, 2007, 2010, 2011, 2017)
- Top CTRS ranking: 9th (2006–07)

Shannon Joanisse, also known as Shannon Aleksic (born September 28, 1976) is a Canadian curler from Abbotsford, British Columbia. She currently plays third on Team Kristen Ryan.

== Curling career ==
=== Juniors ===
Joanisse participated in the Saskatchewan junior provincials as a skip from 1994 until 1998, and then lost her age eligibility, never making it to a Canadian Junior Curling Championships during her eligibility years.

=== 1999–2006 ===
In 1999, Joanisse participated in the Saskatchewan Scott Tournament of Hearts, playing lead for Cindy Street. The team finished second place in round robin, with a 5–2 record. They defeated Anita Ford in the semi-final, before going onto defeat Sandra Schmirler and claiming the Saskatchewan title. At the 1999 Scott Tournament of Hearts, the team finished round robin with a 7–4 record and a third-place finish. They competed against the defending champion's Team Canada and Cathy Borst in the 3–4 game, where they lost the game by a score of 4 to 12.

From 2001 to 2003, Joanisse participated in the Saskatchewan Scott Tournament of Hearts failing to return to the National championship. In 2004, she moved to Ontario, where she participated in the Ontario Scott Tournament of Hearts in 2004 and 2005, but failed to qualify for the nationals. Joanisse moved to Alberta for the 2005/06 curling season, where she participated in the 2006 Alberta Scott Tournament of Hearts, where she again failed to reach another national championship.

=== 2007–2012 ===
After one year living in Alberta, Joanisse moved to British Columbia, where she joined up with Olympic Bronze medallist Kelley Law throwing second stones. The team participated in the 2007 British Columbia Scotties Tournament of Hearts, where the team finished round robin with a 6–1 record. They received a bye to the final, where they defeated Patti Knezevic 10–4 and won the championship. At the 2007 Scotties Tournament of Hearts the team finished with a 5–6 round robin record, failing to reach the playoffs.

Joanisse returned to the 2008 British Columbia Scotties Tournament of Hearts, playing third stones for Jody Maskiewich. The team finished round robin with a 6–1 record. They received a bye to the final, where they lost 5–6 to Allison MacInnes.

Joanisse and the team returned to the 2009 British Columbia Scotties Tournament of Hearts, where they made the playoffs, having finished second with a 5–2 round robin record. They faced Marla Mallett in the semi-final, losing 5–9.

In 2010, Joanisse and Maskiewich joined with Kelley Law, and participated in the 2010 British Columbia Scotties Tournament of Hearts. The team finished round robin in second place with an 8–1 record. They competed against Kelly Scott in the 1–2 playoff game, where they defeating Scott 9–3 and receiving a bye to the final. They competed against Scott again in the final, but lost the game 4–8. Joanisse was chosen by Scott to be the team's fifth player. At the 2010 Scotties Tournament of Hearts the team finished in third place, with a 7–4 record, before going on to lose the 3–4 game to Ontario's Krista McCarville.

The following year, the team returned to the 2011 British Columbia Scotties Tournament of Hearts, where they again finished round robin with an 8–1 record. For a second year in a row the team competed against Scott in the 1–2 game, and like the previous year, defeated the team 9–2, before again losing to them in the final 3–5. Joanisse became the fifth player for Scott at the 2011 Scotties Tournament of Hearts, where the team finished round robin with a 7–4 record, taking them into a tiebreaker game. They faced Nova Scotia's Heather Smith-Dacey, but lost the tiebreaker and a shot at the playoffs.

The team returned to the 2012 British Columbia Scotties Tournament of Hearts, finishing in a four team tie, for fourth place, with a 5–4 record. The team won two tiebreakers and moved onto the playoffs. They defeated Roz Craig in the 3–4 game and for a third consecutive year, faced Kelly Scott in the playoffs. In the semi-final against Scott, the team lost the game 7–9 and ended their chances of reaching the national championships.

=== 2012 to 2014 ===
Following the 2011–12 curling season, Aleksic returned to Alberta, where she joined up with Olympic Silver Medallist, Cheryl Bernard. Joanisse replaced Jennifer Sadleir to play lead.

=== 2014 to present ===
In 2014, she moved to New Westminster, British Columbia to play for Kelly Scott.

== Personal life ==
Shannon Joanisse (née Wilson) was born in Wawota, Saskatchewan. As of 2017, she resides in Abbotsford, British Columbia. She is married to 1989 Canadian Junior Curling Champion skip Dean Joanisse and has two children, Brooklyn and Abbey. She works as the High Performance and Competitions Manager for Curl BC.
