= Victoria Murphy =

Victoria Anne Murphy
- Occupations: Linguist, academic and author

Academic background
- Education: BA., Linguistics and Psychology; MA., Educational Psychology; PhD., Second Language Education
- Alma mater: Queen's University; McGill University

Academic work
- Institutions: University of Oxford

Victoria Anne Murphy is a linguist, academic, and author. She is a professor of Applied Linguistics and Director of the Department of Education at the University of Oxford as well as a Fellow of St. Anne's College. Previously, she served as Chair of the National Association of Language Development in the Curriculum (NALDIC) from 2018 to 2021.

Murphy's research focuses on the connections between child second language learning, vocabulary acquisition, and literacy development. She has published journal articles and two books including Second Language Learning in the Early School Years: Trends and Contexts and Early Childhood Education in English for Speakers of Other Languages. Her work has been supported by grants from the Education Endowment Foundation, the Economic and Social Research Council (ESRC), The Nuffield Foundation, and The Leverhulme Trust.

== Education and early career ==
Murphy earned a Bachelor of Arts in Linguistics in 1989 and an equivalent Psychology Degree in 1990 from Queen's University. She enrolled at McGill University in 1991, obtaining a Master of Arts in Educational Psychology in 1993 and a Doctor of Philosophy in Second Language Education in 2000. Lydia White, Nick Ellis and Nina Spada were her doctoral advisors. During this time, she took on teaching positions at Bishop's University, McGill University, and the University of Hertfordshire.

== Career ==
Murphy continued her academic career as a Senior Lecturer at the University of Hertfordshire from 2000 to 2004. In 2004, she joined the University of Oxford as an associate professor in Applied Linguistics/Second Language Acquisition and became a Fellow of Kellogg College. She has been a professor of Applied Linguistics at Oxford since 2014 and a Fellow of St. Anne's College since 2016.

Murphy served as Chair of the National Association of Language Development in the Curriculum (NALDIC) from 2018 to 2021. She is an adjunct professor at UiT The Arctic University of Norway in Tromsø as part of her collaboration with the C-LaBL research centre hosted there.

== Research ==
Murphy's work examines the relationship between child second language learning, vocabulary acquisition, and literacy development, focusing on how foreign language education in primary school influences first language literacy and the relationship between vocabulary and literacy in emergent bilingual children. She published Second Language Learning in the Early School Years: Trends and Contexts in 2014, which explored research on child second language acquisition in educational settings and compared L2 outcomes across various contexts. The book was shortlisted for the British Association for Applied Linguistics Book Prize in 2015 and the American Association for Applied Linguistics Book Prize in 2016. Later, in 2016, she co-edited Early Childhood Education in English for Speakers of Other Languages with Maria Evangelou, analyzing issues and case studies on English language teaching in Early Childhood Education for non-English speakers, including parental roles, teacher qualifications, best practices, and first-language use. Simone E. Pfenninger remarked, "Early Childhood Education in English for Speakers of Other Languages is ground-breaking in the integrative approach taken to very early L2 teaching and learning, and in its timely focus on pre-school education across the world."

=== Language teaching approaches ===
Murphy's research on teaching has centered on effective foreign language teaching and children's linguistic development. In a report for the Education Endowment Fund, she found that effective foreign language teaching relies more on program characteristics and teacher skills rather than specific methods, highlighting the need for engaging input, noting the mixed findings on bilingualism's cognitive benefits, and variable effectiveness of non-native language instruction. Alongside Catherine Hamilton, she investigated teachers' beliefs about using songs in early education, concluding that they intuitively rely on songs to teach content, manage routines, and support linguistic and social development. Her work further assessed how child, wordform, and meaning factors influence children's understanding of homonyms, discovering that word frequency, dominance, and imageability significantly impact knowledge for both native and non-native English speakers.

Murphy demonstrated that not understanding multi-word expressions can hinder reading comprehension in both children learning English as an additional language (EAL) and monolingual children, with EAL learners facing greater challenges. Building upon this, she showed that both groups efficiently re-analyze inconsistent information when they have larger vocabularies, indicating successful comprehension monitoring. Additionally, in joint research, she validated a new measure of polysemy knowledge for children with EAL and EL1, revealing that polysemy knowledge significantly enhances reading comprehension and is influenced by age and language status.

=== Cognitive skills and language learning ===
Murphy has collaborated with Gaia Scerif in studying the link between cognitive skills and language learning among children. Looking into the relationship between executive functions and numeracy skills in early childhood. Their work revealed that executive functions predict symbolic math performance, while stronger early math skills are associated with later executive function growth. Moreover, she examined whether bilingual children show an advantage over monolingual children in divergent thinking, finding no evidence of such an advantage after controlling for relevant factors.

=== Technology in education ===
Murphy's recent work has focused on the implications of using technology in education. Collaborating with Rebecca Eynon and Sandra Mathers, she analyzed how features of mobile apps—such as narration and augmented reality—affect children's language learning, highlighting mixed results and a need for further research. Furthermore, she reviewed 77 studies on the ethics of digital trace data in education, identifying key concerns like privacy, validity, and ethical decision-making, while underlining research gaps, particularly regarding preschool and school-aged children.

As Principal Investigator of the Learning for Families through Technology LiFT project team at the University of Oxford, Murphy has received funding from Ferrero as part of their collaboration with Gameloft. The study has investigated children's learning through games within Applaydu focusing on vocabulary learning, creativity and joint media engagement.

== Bibliography ==
=== Books ===
- Second language learning in the early school years: Trends and Contexts (2014) ISBN 978-0-19-434885-0
- Early Childhood Education in English for Speakers of Other Languages (2016) ISBN 978-0-86355-782-8

=== Selected articles ===
- Murphy, V. A. (1997). The effect of modality on a grammaticality judgement task. Second Language Research, 13(1), 34–65.
- Murphy, R. A., Mondragón, E., & Murphy, V. A. (2008). Rule learning by rats. Science, 319(5871), 1849–1851.
- Martinez, R., & Murphy, V. A. (2011). Effect of frequency and idiomaticity on second language reading comprehension. TESOL Quarterly, 45(2), 267–290.
- Murphy, V. A., & Unthiah, A. (2015). A systematic review of intervention research examining English language and literacy development in children with English as an Additional Language (EAL). Education Endowment Foundation, 49(3), 1-57.
- Hakimi, L., Eynon, R., & Murphy, V. A. (2021). The ethics of using digital trace data in education: A thematic review of the research landscape. Review of educational research, 91(5), 671–717.
