= Nanaimo Curling Club =

The Nanaimo Curling Club is a curling club located in Nanaimo, British Columbia. The club plays out of the Nanaimo Curling Centre on Wall Street in Bowen Park.

The club was founded in 1947 at the Nanaimo Civic Arena, though the club began regular curling play in 1949 on one sheet of ice. A four sheet curling rink was built in 1951 located immediately north of the current club site. A fifth sheet was added in 1953, at the same time the Ladies club was incorporated. The club built an eight sheet club in 1969. In 2017, the club won the Travelers Curling Club Championship.

== Provincial champions ==
The club has won a number of provincial curling titles over the years:

=== Women's ===
The club has won the women's provincial championships four times:

- 1957: Margaret Fuller, Pat Good, Sylvia Koster, Edna Quinney
- 1961: Margaret Fuller, Sylvia Koster, Edna Quinney, Fernande Smith
- 1973: Karin Kaese, Shannon Blackburn, Loretta Ahlstrom, Donna Dunn
- 2018: Kesa Van Osch, Marika Van Osch, Kalia Van Osch, Amy Gibson

=== Junior Women's ===
- 2012: Kesa Van Osch, Kalia Van Osch, Marika Van Osch, Brooklyn Leitch
- 2014: Kalia Van Osch, Marika Van Osch, Sarah Daniels, Ashley Sanderson, Megan Daniels (shared with the Delta Curling Club)

=== Senior Women's ===
- 1988: Helen Elson, Mary Williams, Marj Tegart, Evelyn Provost
- 2012: Penny Shantz, Debbie Jones Walker, Deborah Pulak, Shirley Wong

=== Master Women's ===
- 2002: Jessie Whittam, Marj Fenske, Eileen Smith, Trudy Knelson

=== Junior Men's ===
- 1972: Rick Neff, Murray Norby, Brian Cann, Bob Smiley
- 1980: Stacey Coomber, Randy Thiessen, Jim Newlands, Mike Cameron
- 1983: Bob McIntosh, Alan Sutherland, Kevin Kelly, Greg Peachy

=== Senior Men's ===
- 1970: Don MacRae, Gene Koster, Bev Smiley, Doc Howden (Canadian Senior Champions)

=== Master Men's ===
- 1992: Archie McIntosh, Gene Klymchuk, Glen Anderson, Norrie Nishio

=== Mixed ===
- 2016: Wes Craig, Kesa Van Osch, Miles Craig, Marika Van Osch (shared with the Kerry Park Curling Club)
