= Marla Mallett =

Canadian curler

- Curler
- Born: December 19, 1970 (age 55); Nanaimo, British Columbia

Team
- Curling club: Golden Ears WC, Maple Ridge, BC

Curling career
- Hearts: 4 (1995, 1997, 2009, 2017)
- Top CTRS ranking: 12th (2008-09)
Medal record
Curling
Representing Canada
World Junior Championships
Gold medal – first place	1988 Chamonix
Representing British Columbia
Scotties Tournament of Hearts
Silver medal – second place	2009 Victoria
Canadian Olympic Curling Trials
Bronze medal – third place	1997 Brandon

Marla Mallett (born December 19, 1970, as Marla Geiger in Nanaimo, British Columbia) is a Canadian curler from Walnut Grove, British Columbia.

== Career ==
=== 1988–1997 ===
Mallett is a three time former Canadian and World Junior champion in 1988 playing with for Julie Sutton (Skinner).

In 1995 Mallett played in her first Tournament of Hearts. She played skip for the British Columbia team, and finished the round robin with a 6–5 record. She would then join up with Kelley Owen (Law), and played in the 1997 Scott Tournament of Hearts. The team finished in last place, with a 3–8 record that year.

=== 2009–current ===
Mallett would not return to the Hearts until the 2009 event, held in her home province. Her team consisting of Grace MacInnes, Diane Gushulak and Jacalyn Brown, defied many people's expectations by finishing the round robin in first place with an 8–3 record and lost in the final to the defending champion Jennifer Jones.

Mallett would return to the 2010 British Columbia Scotties Tournament of Hearts as the defending champion. Her team would finish round robin in fourth place with a 5–4 record. They would end up winning the 3–4 game against Kristen Fewster and would face Kelly Scott in the semi-final. After a close game, Mallett would lose 5–6 to Scott, ending her chances to return to the national championship.

At the end of the 2010 season Mallett would part ways with MacInnes, Gushulak and Brown. She would add Kelly Shimizu, Janelle Sakamoto and Colleen Hannah to her team, but it would not be a successful combination. The team failed to qualify for the 2011 Provincials.

Halfway through the 2011/2012 curling season Mallett and Shimizu would lose their front end. Mallett would reach out to her friend Barbara Zbeetnoff, but was still short a player, and after a recommendation would take on Danielle Callens, a player she had never heard of before. In the short time together, the line up would be successful and would qualify for the 2012 British Columbia Scotties Tournament of Hearts, out of the fourth and final qualifier. At the provincial event the team would have more success, finishing second in round robin with a 6–2 record. The team would face Kelly Scott in the 1–2 game, and after ten ends with the score tied 5–5, would take 5 points against Scott in the extra end, giving them a bye to the final. The team would again meet Scott in the final, with the score again tied 5–5 in the ninth end Mallett, in the tenth end, would fail to get her final rock into an empty house, allowing Scott the opportunity to throw her final stone anywhere into the rings, handing Mallett the loss.

== Personal life ==
Mallett is the Western Region Business Manager with the Public Health Agency of Canada. She graduated from Kelowna Secondary School.

== Grand Slam record ==
Key
C	Champion
F	Lost in Final
SF	Lost in Semifinal
QF	Lost in Quarterfinals
R16	Lost in the round of 16
Q	Did not advance to playoffs
T2	Played in Tier 2 event
DNP	Did not participate in event
N/A	Not a Grand Slam event that season

Event	2006–07	2007–08	2008–09	2009–10
Autumn Gold	DNP	DNP	DNP	Q
Manitoba Lotteries	DNP	DNP	DNP	Q
Players' Championships	DNP	DNP	Q	DNP
Wayden Transportation	SF	Q	Q	N/A
