= Curl BC =

- Sport: Curling
- Jurisdiction: Provincial
- Membership: 81 curling clubs
- Founded: 2004
- Affiliation: Curling Canada
- Headquarters: Burnaby

Official website
- www.curlbc.ca
- (Canada)

Curl BC is the provincial sport governing body responsible for the development, promotion and organization of curling in British Columbia, Canada. Curl BC is also responsible for the championship system that declares provincial representation at Curling Canada events.

The organization has a membership of 25,000 curlers spread over 81 clubs, which are organized into 11 regions. Curl BC was formed in June 2004 from the amalgamation of the Pacific Coast Curling Association, the British Columbia Interior Curling Association and the British Columbia Ladies’ Curling Association.

Curling clubs in the Northern Rockies Regional Municipality and Peace River Regional District are members of Curling Alberta, not Curl BC.

== Events ==
Curl BC runs nine championship events in the province:

- The Canadian Direct Insurance BC Men's Curling Championship
- The Scotties BC Women's Curling Championship
- The Tim Hortons BC Junior Curling Championships
- The Tim Hortons BC Juvenile Curling Championships (during non BC Winter Games years)
- The Tim Hortons BC Senior Curling Championships
- The AMJ Campbell Van Lines BC Mixed Curling Championship
- The BC Wheelchair Curling Championship
- The BC Masters Curling Championships
- The BC Mixed Doubles Curling Championship

Curl BC also runs an Annual Awards event to recognize athletes, volunteers and supporters of curling in British Columbia.

A Curling Centre of the Year Award is given out in recognition of a centre's service to the curling community. The Langley Curling Club topped its most successful season ever by winning the award for 2012/2013. In 2013/14, the Coquitlam Curling Club was the recipient of the Curling Centre of the Year Award.

== See also ==
- List of curling clubs in British Columbia
