= Jacquie Armstrong =

Canadian curler (born 1976)

- Curler
- Born: March 19, 1976 (age 50); Penticton, British Columbia, Canada

Team
- Curling club: Kelowna CC, Kelowna, BC

Curling career
- Hearts: 4 (2003, 2010, 2011, 2012)
- World Championship: 0
- Top CTRS ranking: 3rd (2009-10)
- Grand Slam victories: 1: Manitoba Lotteries, 2009
Medal record
Curling
Scotties Tournament of Hearts
| Silver medal – second place | 2012 Red Deer |

Jacquie Armstrong (born March 19, 1976) is a Canadian curler from Vancouver, British Columbia, Canada. She previously played lead for the Kelly Scott rink.

Armstrong joined the rink in 2009, replacing Renee Simons. Prior to 2009, Armstrong played second for Jody Maskiewich. In total, Armstrong has played in seven provincial championships (2000, 2001, 2002, 2008, 2009, 2010 and 2011) including two where she won with the Scott rink (2010 and 2011). At the 2010 Scotties Tournament of Hearts, the team finished in 4th place. At the 2003 Scott Tournament of Hearts she was an alternate for the Toni Fister B.C. rink, but did not play any games.

In 2009 as a member of the Scott rink, Armstrong won her lone Grand Slam of Curling event when they won the 2009 Manitoba Lotteries Women's Curling Classic.

Outside of curling, she is a software development manager.
