= Richmond Curling Centre =

Curling facility in Richmond, British Columbia

Richmond Curling Club
- Location: 5440 Hollybridge Way; Richmond, British Columbia
- Arena: Richmond Curling Centre

Information
- Established: 1958
- Club type: Dedicated Ice
- Curling Canada region: Curl BC Region 5
- Sheets of ice: Eight
- Rock colours: Blue and Red
- Website: Official website

The Richmond Curling Centre is an eight-sheet curling facility in Richmond, British Columbia that is the home of the Richmond Curling Club. The club is located on Hollybridge Way in the Richmond City Centre neighbourhood of the city.

The club was founded in 1958, with the first organizational meeting held on October 8 of that year. One week later a 3.4-acre plot of land was bought on Cambie Road for $200,000. The club was finally opened on January 1, 1961, as the Richmond Winter Club with plans to expand the facility to include skating and racket sports. Later that year the Richmond Ladies Curling Club was also founded. In 1963 a lounge was added to the building and in 1965 a parking lot was added.

After a deal with the City of Richmond, the club was moved from Cambie Road to its current location on Hollybridge.

Since 2000 the club has hosted the Pacific International Cup each April.

== Provincial champions ==
The club has won a number of provincial curling titles over the years: The club was home to the 2000 Scott Tournament of Hearts champion, 2000 World Women's Curling Championship gold medalist and 2002 Winter Olympics bronze medal champion Kelley Law rink. The club also won the men's 2018 Travelers Curling Club Championship with the team of Vic Shimizu, Cody Tanaka, Trevor Bakken and Mark Yodogawa.

=== Women's ===
The club has won the women's provincial championships ten times:

- 1977: Heather Kerr, Bernice McCallan, Shirley Snihur, Una Goodyear
- 1978: Heather Haywood, Bernice McCallan, Shirley Snihur, Una Goodyear
- 1983: Heather Kerr, Bernice McCallan, Sherry Lethbridge, Sandy McCubbin
- 1986: Heather Kerr, Bernice McCallan, Sherry Lethbridge, Rita Imai
- 1992: Lisa Anne Walker, Kelley Owen, Cindy McArdle, Cathy Sauer
- 1995: Marla Geiger, Kelley Owen, Sherry Fraser, Christine Jurgenson
- 1997: Kelley Owen, Marla Geiger, Sherry Fraser, Christine Jurgenson
- 2000: Kelley Law, Julie Skinner, Georgina Wheatcroft, Diane Nelson
- 2001: Shelley Macdonald, Lisa Whitaker, Adina Tasaka, Jacalyn Brown
- 2002: Kristy Lewis, Krista Bernard, Denise Blashko, Susan Allen

=== Junior Women's ===
- 1997: Julie Provost, Lindsay Kostenuik, Michelle Blacker, Nadine Favreau
- 2008: Kelly Thomson, Kelly Shimizu, Cynthia Lu, Jennifer Allen
- 2009: Kelly Shimizu, Kayte Gyles, Janelle Sakamoto, Julianna Tsang

=== Master Women's ===
- 2010: Karin Host, Lorraine Warn, Dianne Tasaka, Betty Dharmasetia
- 2011: Karin Host, Dianne Tasaka, Lorraine Warn, Betty Dharmasetia

=== Men's ===
The club has won the men's provincial championships four times:

- 1968: Bob McCubbin, Jack Tucker, Ted Trimble, Keith Isaac
- 1973: Jack Tucker, Bernie Sparkes, Jim Armstrong, Gerry Peckham
- 1974: Jim Armstrong, Bernie Sparkes, Gerry Peckham, Clark Winterton
- 2026: Cody Tanaka, Jared Kolomaya, Mitchell Kopytko, Coburn Fadden

=== Junior Men's ===
- 1986: Graham Franklin, Rob Robinson, Steve Stroup, Stan Rick
- 2008: Jay Wakefield, Chase Martyn, Paul Cseke, Jamie Danbrook

=== Senior Men's ===
- 1999: Ken Watson, Ed Dezura, John Himbury, Howard Grisack (1999 Canadian Senior Curling Championships winners)
- 2009: Brian Gessner, John Smiley, Bill Rafter, Craig McLeod
- 2011: Greg McAulay, Ken Watson, Dale Hockley, Dale Reibin

=== Master Men's ===
- 2016: Keith Switzer, Vic Shimizu, Ben Nishi, Wayne Saito

=== Mixed ===
- 1967: Chuck Kennedy, Betty Bacon, Bruce Bacon, Verna Lawer
- 1973: Jim Armstrong, Marion Chamberlin, Gerry Peckham, Leslie Clark
- 1980: Bob McCubbin, Heater Haywood, Ken Watson, Sandy McCubbin
- 2018: Cody Tanaka, Shawna Jensen, Travis Cameron, Catera Park (shared with the Tunnel Town Curling Club)
