= Cranbrook Curling Centre =

Curling facility in British Columbia, Canada

Cranbrook Curling Club Cranbrook Curling Centre
- Interactive map of Cranbrook Curling Club
- Location: 1777 2 St N Cranbrook, British Columbia, Canada

Information
- Established: 1906
- Club type: Dedicated Ice
- Curling Canada region: The Kootenays (Zone 1), Curl BC
- Sheets of ice: 6
- Rock colours: Red and Yellow
- Website: cranbrook.curling.io/en/pages/1862-home

The Cranbrook Curling Centre is a curling facility based in Cranbrook, British Columbia. It is home to the Cranbrook Curling Club.

== History ==
The club was admitted into the Kootenay Curling Association in 1906. That same year, the Kootenay Curling Association changed its name to the British Columbia Curling Association when it affiliated with the Royal Caledonian Curling Club, with the club hosting the association's bonspiel that season. The club's president at the time was Judge Peter E. Wilson. At the time, the club was the largest building in the city. After a fire in the city in 1908, it was used as a site to feed refugees. The club briefly joined the Alberta Curling Association before re-joining the BC Association in 1909.

In its early days, the club was based on Norbury Avenue, and played on natural ice, and had up to nine sheets of ice.

The Cranbrook Curling Rink Company, Limited was formally incorporated as a company with the province in 1924, when the club moved to a new rink. At the time there were over 100 members of the club.

In 1925, the club was one of the founding rinks in the Selkirk Curling Association, which covered clubs in the East Kootenay region. In the 1920s, the club was a member of the BC Curling Association, the Crows Nest Association and the Selkirk Association. During this time, its membership in those associations were fluid. In 1926, the Cranbrook Ladies' Curling Club was founded.

In 1933, the club obtained the Cranbrook Curling Rink Company at cost. In 1943, the club made memberships free for high school students. In 1945, the club made plans to convert the rink into a community centre rink.

In 1949, the club saw a record membership, and underwent extensive renovations, including weatherproofing, a new kitchen, a coffee bar and the modernization of the club's waiting room. At the time, the club had five sheets, and still played on natural ice. One of the five sheets was reserved for the Ladies' Curling Club.

Due to playing on natural ice, games were often delayed due to poor ice conditions, especially when a chinook would blow into the town. On November 3, 1953, the club finally installed an artificial ice plant operated by the city, and began the season with a public bonspiel open to anyone in the city. The ice plant also served the Memorial Arena. The total expenditure to the club for use of the plant was $20,000. Equipment installation charges were nearly paid off by the end of the season.

In 1962, the club opened new club quarters designed by the local firm of A. E. Jones Co. Ltd. The new quarters consisted of a two-storey cement block structure measuring 36 by 80 feet with a kitchen and washroom facility on each floor. The ground floor housed the gas heating equipment and a viewing area for all five sheets. The second storey also provided glass frontage of the arena, and had room for banquets, parties and receptions. Renovations also included new fluorescent lighting.

In 1972, city voters went to the polls to vote on approving $275,000 in debentures to construct a new facility for the club. In 1974, the club opened a new rink. By the 1990s, the club had over 600 members and eight sheets of ice.

In 1997, the club played host to the BC Men's Curling Championship, amidst controversy surrounding the residency of some members of the Pat Ryan rink, which resulted in someone breaking into the club's locker room and pouring beer and urinating on the lockers of Team Ryan. The club also hosted the TSN Skins Game that year, and the BC Women's Curling Championship in 1998.

In 2010, the club and the city signed an agreement that would allow the club to take over management of the rink.

When the city hosted the 2011 Canada Cup of Curling, the club was used as the "patch" for event, acting as the event's "social hub". In 2012, the centre hosted the BC Provincial Indoor Archery Championships.

In July 2013, Scottish rock band Nazareth were set to play at the centre, but 30 seconds into their first song, frontman Dan McCafferty collapsed on stage, forcing the cancellation of the concert. It was later revealed to be a stomach ulcer, and precipitated his departure from the band.

In 2014, the city renewed its funding deal with the club, with the announcement of an annual sum of $40,000 for five years. Previously, the club had a three-year agreement for $50,000 of annual funding.

In August 2017, the centre acted as an emergency reception centre during the Lamb Creek fire during the 2017 British Columbia wildfires.

During the COVID-19 pandemic in British Columbia, the club acted as an immunization site.

== Provincial champions ==
Teams from the Cranbrook Curling Club have won provincial championships several times:

Event	Year	Team	Record at natl. championship
Women's	1968	Myrtle Fashoway, Anne McLay, Fern Hawkes, Eleanor Campbell	(silver) 7–3
Men's	1991	Gerry Kent, Brian Collinson, Tom Shypitka, Ken McHargue	(bronze) 8–5
Master Men's	2003	Neil Dickson, Ron Schefield, Cal McKerracher, Toby Gripich	4th 3–4
Master Men's	2014	Ralph Will, Gerald Kent, Peter Sweetman, Fraser McKie	4th 6–4
Mixed	1994	Eric Wiltzen, Jan Wiltzen, David Toffolo, Sheril Becke	(silver) 7–5
Men's Club	2025	Mitch Young, Steve Tersmette, Matthew Reynolds, Kevin Hoglund (Note: The entire team are members of both the Cranbrook and Kimberley Curling Clubs, but live in Kimberley. Officially, the team competed for the Cranbrook Curling Club at Nationals)	(gold) 8–2
