= Kelley Law =

Canadian curler (born 1966)

- Curler
- Other names: Kelley Owen
- Born: Kelley Atkins; January 11, 1966 (age 60); Burnaby, British Columbia, Canada

Team
- Curling club: Royal City CC, New Westminster, British Columbia

Curling career
- Hearts: 7 (1990, 1992, 1995, 1997, 2000, 2001, 2007)
- World Championship: 1 (2000)
- Top CTRS ranking: 9th (2006-07)
Medal record
Women's curling
Representing Canada
Olympic Games
Bronze medal – third place	2002 Salt Lake City
World Championships
Gold medal – first place	2000 Glasgow
Representing British Columbia
Scotties Tournament of Hearts
Gold medal – first place	2000 Prince George
Silver medal – second place	2001 Sudbury
Bronze medal – third place	1992 Halifax
Canadian Olympic Curling Trials
Gold medal – first place	2001 Regina
Bronze medal – third place	1997 Brandon

Kelley Law (born January 11, 1966, in Burnaby, British Columbia), née Atkins, formerly Owen, is a Canadian curler from Coquitlam, British Columbia. She skipped her team to won a bronze medal at the 2002 Winter Olympics in Salt Lake City and gold medal at 2000 World Women's Curling Championship. She grew up in Maple Ridge, British Columbia.

== Career ==
Law is most notable for winning a bronze medal at the 2002 Winter Olympics in Salt Lake City, Utah, for Canada, with her team of Julie Skinner (Third), Georgina Wheatcroft (Second) and Diane Nelson (Lead). She had an 8–1 record going into the playoffs but lost the semi-final to Great Britain's Rhona Martin who would eventually claim gold. Kelley beat the United States' Kari Erickson for the bronze medal. Law also won the 2000 Scott Tournament of Hearts which qualified her for that year's World Championships, which she also won. The following year she was runner-up at the 2001 Scott Tournament of Hearts where she lost in the final to Nova Scotia's Colleen Jones. Law would take a few years off from curling, and her team split up, with Wheatcroft going on to skip her own team to the 2004 Scott Tournament of Hearts. Wheatcroft then went on to play with Jennifer Jones from the 2005–06 season before returning to play with Law in 2006.

Law returned in 2006 from a curling hiatus which involved having a baby and becoming a certified real estate agent for RE/MAX. In 2007, Law has made her way back to the national championship, now called the Scotties Tournament of Hearts after winning the B.C. Provincial championship on January 28, 2007, with her new team. At the 2007 Scotties Tournament of Hearts, Law finished with a 5–6 record.

Law has decided to take the 2007–2008 season off due to her work commitments. As a result, her team has separated. Her former third, Georgina Wheatcroft and lead, Darah Provençal have left to join Colleen Jones to form a new team.
