= Olympic trials =

Competitions held in certain sports

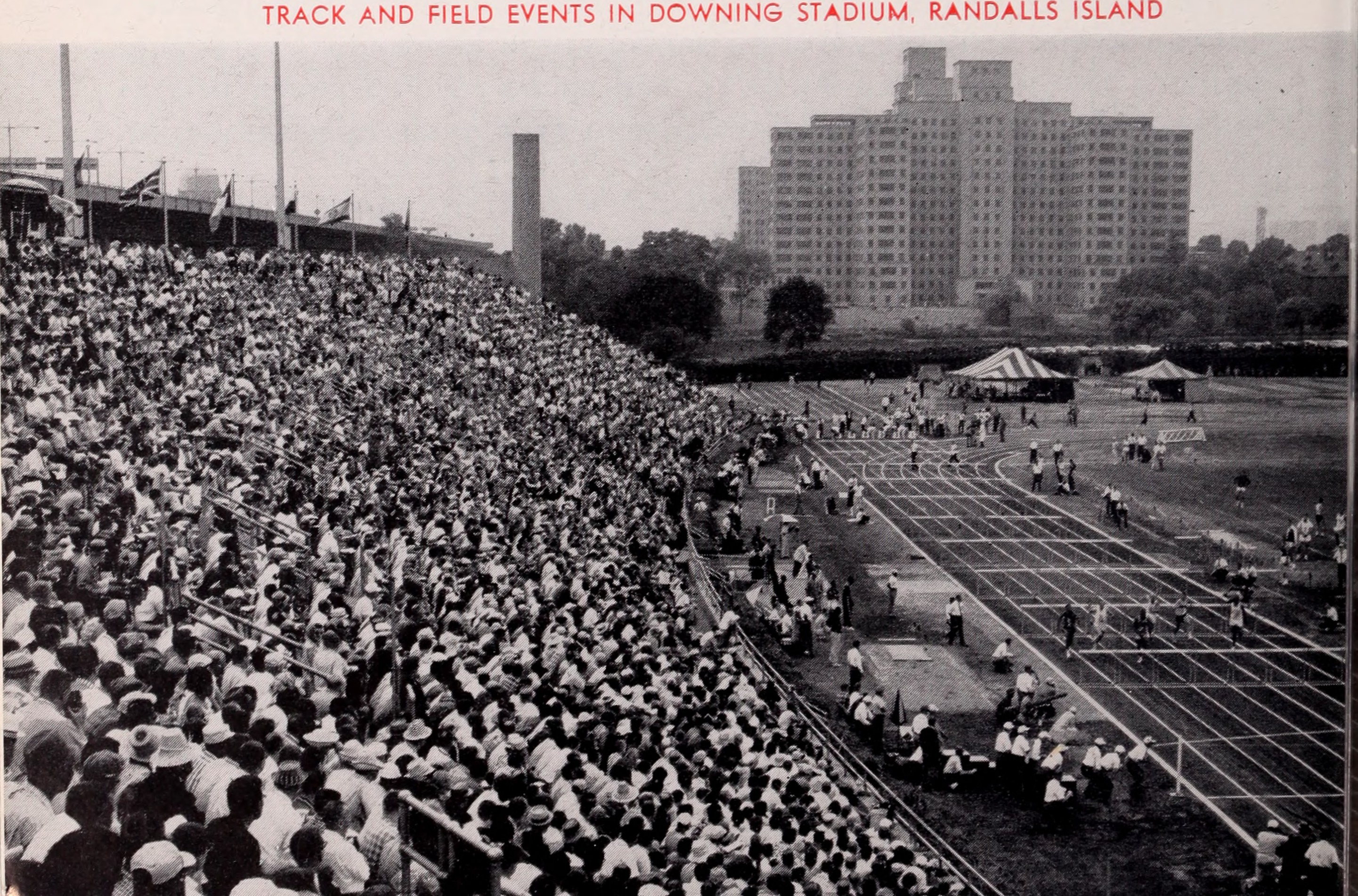
The 1964 United States Olympic trials for track and field at Downing Stadium in Randalls Island, New York City

Olympic trials are competitions held in certain sports to select teams' participants in those sports at the Olympic Games.

== History ==
Before 1908, members of United States Olympic teams were selected without trials. The 1908 and 1912 teams were selected based on regional trials, though the Eastern trials were favored. In the United States, no Olympic trials were held in 1916 due to World War I, nor in 1940 and 1944 due to World War II, though Olympic marathon team members were named in 1940.

== List ==
Olympic trials include:

- Australian Olympic trials
  - 2019 Australian World Swimming Trials
  - 2021 Australian Swimming Trials
  - 2024 Australian Swimming Trials
- British Olympic trials
  - 2000 AAA Championships
  - 2021 British Athletics Marathon and 20 km Walk Trial
- Canadian Olympic trials
  - Canadian Olympic Curling Trials
- Japanese Olympic trials
  - 2017 Japanese Olympic curling trials
  - 2021 Japanese Olympic mixed doubles curling trials
  - 2021 Japanese Olympic curling trials
- Kenyan Olympic trials
  - 2016 Athletics Kenya Olympic Trials
  - 2024 Athletics Kenya Olympic Trials
- Russian Olympic trials
  - 2017 Russian Olympic curling trials
  - 2021 Russian Olympic mixed doubles curling trials
- Swiss Olympic trials
  - 2009 Swiss Olympic curling trials
  - 2017 Swiss Olympic curling trials
  - 2021 Swiss Olympic curling trials
- United States Olympic trials
