= Curling at the 2022 Winter Olympics – Qualification =

A total of 10 teams in each tournament (5 athletes per team) will qualify for a quota of 100 athletes in curling at the 2022 Winter Olympics. A further 10 mixed doubles pairs will qualify for a total of 20 athletes. Therefore, a total of 120 athletes can qualify in total to compete in the curling competitions.

== Summary ==
=== Final summary ===
Six nations – Canada, Great Britain, Sweden, Switzerland and the United States, along with hosts China – achieved a maximum representation of 12 quota places across all three events, while, in total 14 NOCS are represented in the curling competition in Beijing. Although they competed in the 1992 demonstration event, this was Australia's debut in curling as a full Olympic event.

Nations	Men	Women	Mixed doubles	Athletes
Australia			Yes	2
Canada	Yes	Yes	Yes	12
China	Yes	Yes	Yes	12
Czech Republic			Yes	2
Denmark	Yes	Yes		10
Great Britain	Yes	Yes	Yes	12
Italy	Yes		Yes	7
Japan		Yes		5
Norway	Yes		Yes	7
ROC	Yes	Yes		10
South Korea		Yes		5
Sweden	Yes	Yes	Yes	12
Switzerland	Yes	Yes	Yes	12
United States	Yes	Yes	Yes	12
Total: 14 NOCs	10	10	10	120

=== Men ===
Means of qualification	Dates	Location	Quotas	Qualified
Host nation	—N/a		1	China
2021 World Men's Curling Championship	2–11 April 2021	Calgary, Canada	6	Sweden; Great Britain; Switzerland; ROC; Canada; United States
Olympic Qualification Event	11–18 December 2021	Leeuwarden, Netherlands	3	Norway; Italy; Denmark
Total			10	

=== Women ===
Means of qualification	Dates	Location	Quotas	Qualified
Host nation	—N/a		1	China
2021 World Women's Curling Championship	30 April–9 May 2021	Calgary, Canada	6	Switzerland; ROC; United States; Sweden; Denmark; Canada
Olympic Qualification Event	11–18 December 2021	Leeuwarden, Netherlands	3	Great Britain; Japan; South Korea
Total			10	

=== Mixed doubles ===
Means of qualification	Dates	Location	Quotas	Qualified
Host nation	—N/a		1	China
2021 World Mixed Doubles Curling Championship	17–23 May 2021	Aberdeen, United Kingdom	7	Great Britain; Norway; Sweden; Canada; Italy; Switzerland; Czech Republic
Olympic Qualification Event	5–9 December 2021	Leeuwarden, Netherlands	2	Australia; United States
Total			10	

== Qualification System ==
The 2022 Winter Olympics is scheduled to feature ten team fields for each of the three tournaments (men's, women's, and mixed doubles). This will be an increase from the eight-team mixed doubles field in 2018.

Prior to the COVID-19 pandemic, nations were to earn Olympic Qualification Points based on their performance in the 2020 and 2021 World Curling Championships. China (as the host nation) will receive an automatic berth in each discipline. The top seven other nations in the Olympic Qualification Point list for each discipline were also to receive positions in the Olympics. The remaining two positions in each tournament were to be awarded to the winners of an Olympic Qualification Event in late 2021.

This system was amended after the 2020 World Curling Championships were cancelled due to the pandemic. Now only the 2021 world championship results are used for automatic qualification. The top six nations in the 2021 men's and women's world championships qualified for the Olympics, and the top seven nations in the 2021 World Mixed Doubles Curling Championship also qualified. China qualified for all three Olympic tournaments as the host nation. The remaining positions in the Olympic tournament will be awarded to the top nations in Olympic Qualification Events to be held in late 2021. All nations that qualified for world championships in 2020 or 2021 but have not already qualified for the Olympics will be eligible to compete in the Olympic Qualification Events, in addition to the top two (men's and women's) or three (mixed doubles) qualifiers in a Pre-Qualifier Event that is open to all other nations.

== Qualification Timeline ==
Event	Date	Host city
2020 World Women's Curling Championship	Cancelled due to the COVID-19 pandemic	Prince George, Canada
2020 World Men's Curling Championship	Cancelled due to the COVID-19 pandemic	Glasgow, Scotland, United Kingdom
2020 World Mixed Doubles Curling Championship	Cancelled due to the COVID-19 pandemic	Kelowna, Canada
2021 World Men's Curling Championship	2–11 April 2021	Calgary, Canada
2021 World Women's Curling Championship	30 April–9 May 2021	Calgary, Canada
2021 World Mixed Doubles Curling Championship	17–23 May 2021	Aberdeen, Scotland, United Kingdom
2021 Pre-Olympic Qualification Event	5–15 October 2021	Erzurum, Turkey
2021 Olympic Qualification Event	5–18 December 2021	Leeuwarden, Netherlands

== Qualification Results ==
Key
	Olympic Host Nation
	Qualified for the Olympic Games via placement at the 2021 World Championships
	Qualified for the Olympic Games via the Olympic Qualification Event
	Qualified for the Olympic Qualification Event
	Nation Qualified for the 2022 Winter Olympics
✔	Nation Qualified Without Participating in the Pre-OQE or OQE
✖	Nation Didn't Qualify for the Event

=== Men ===
Q	Country	2021	Pre-OQE	OQE
	Sweden	1	✔	
	Great Britain	2	✔	
	Switzerland	3	✔	
	ROC	4	✔	
	Canada	5	✔	
	United States	5	✔	
	Italy	7	✔	2
	Norway	8	✔	1
	Japan	9	✔	6
	Germany	10	✔	9
	Denmark	11	✔	3
	Netherlands	12	✔	7
	South Korea	13	✔	8
	China	14	✔	
	Czech Republic	✖	1	4
	Finland	✖	1	5
	Spain	✖	3	✖
	Turkey	✖	3	✖
	Belgium	✖	5	✖
	Kyrgyzstan	✖	5	✖
	Austria	✖	7	✖
	Brazil	✖	7	✖
	Chinese Taipei	✖	7	✖
	Estonia	✖	7	✖
	Hungary	✖	7	✖
	Kazakhstan	✖	7	✖
	Latvia	✖	7	✖
	Nigeria	✖	7	✖
	Romania	✖	7	✖
	Slovakia	✖	7	✖
	Slovenia	✖	7	✖

=== Women ===
Q	Country	2021	Pre-OQE	OQE
	Switzerland	1	✔	
	ROC	2	✔	
	United States	3	✔	
	Sweden	4	✔	
	Denmark	5	✔	
	Canada	5	✔	
	South Korea	7	✔	3
	Great Britain	8	✔	1
	Germany	9	✔	6
	China	10	✔	
	Japan	11	✔	2
	Czech Republic	12	✔	9
	Italy	13	✔	5
	Estonia	14	✔	8
	Netherlands	✖	✔	DNA
	Latvia	✖	1	4
	Turkey	✖	2	7
	Slovakia	✖	3	✖
	Hungary	✖	4	✖
	Austria	✖	5	✖
	Brazil	✖	5	✖
	Kazakhstan	✖	5	✖
	Norway	✖	5	✖
	Slovenia	✖	5	✖
	Spain	✖	5	✖

=== Mixed doubles ===
Q	Country	2021	Pre-OQE	OQE
	Great Britain	1	✔	
	Norway	2	✔	
	Sweden	3	✔	
	Canada	4	✔	
	Italy	5	✔	
	Switzerland	5	✔	
	Czech Republic	7	✔	
	United States	8	✔	1
	China	9	✔	
	Germany	10	✔	7
	ROC	11	✔	3
	New Zealand	12	✔	7
	Australia	13	✔	1
	England	14	✖	
	Hungary	15	✔	5
	Japan	15	✔	7
	Finland	17	✔	5
	South Korea	17	✔	3
	Estonia	19	✔	7
	Spain	20	✔	7
	Netherlands	✖	✔	DNA
	Denmark	✖	1	7
	Latvia	✖	1	7
	Turkey	✖	1	7
	Belarus	✖	4	✖
	Kazakhstan	✖	4	✖
	Portugal	✖	4	✖
	Austria	✖	7	✖
	Brazil	✖	7	✖
	Chinese Taipei	✖	7	✖
	Belgium	✖	10	✖
	Kyrgyzstan	✖	10	✖
	Lithuania	✖	10	✖
	Mexico	✖	10	✖
	Nigeria	✖	10	✖
	Slovakia	✖	10	✖
	Slovenia	✖	10	✖

Note: Scotland, England and Wales all compete separately in international curling. By an agreement between the curling federations of those three home nations, only Scotland can qualify for the Olympics on behalf of Great Britain.

== National qualifying events ==
Some countries select their teams through trial qualification tournaments.

- (Canada) 2021 Canadian Olympic Curling Trials
- (Japan) 2021 Japanese Olympic Curling Trials
- (Japan) 2021 Japanese mixed doubles curling Olympic trials
- (South Korea) 2021 Korean Curling Championships
- (South Korea) 2021 Korean Mixed Doubles Curling Championship
- (Russia) 2021 Russian mixed doubles curling Olympic trials
- (Switzerland) 2021 Swiss Olympic Curling Trials
- 2021 United States Olympic Curling Trials
- 2021 United States mixed doubles curling Olympic trials
