= Chiaki Matsumura =

Japanese curler (born 1992)

- Curler
- Born: October 26, 1992 (age 34); Aomori, Aomori

Team
- Curling club: Karuizawa CC, Karuizawa
- Mixed doubles partner: Yasumasa Tanida

Curling career
- Member Association: Japan
- World Championship: 3 (2013, 2019, 2022)
- World Mixed Doubles Championship: 3 (2022, 2023, 2025)
- Pacific-Asia Championship: 3 (2011, 2012, 2019)
Medal record
Women's Curling
Representing Japan
World Mixed Doubles Championship
Silver medal – second place	2023 Gangneung
Pacific-Asia Championships
Silver medal – second place	2012 Naseby
Silver medal – second place	2019 Shenzhen
Representing Nagano
Japan Curling Championships
Gold medal – first place	2012 Aomori
Gold medal – first place	2013 Sapporo
Gold medal – first place	2014 Karuizawa
Gold medal – first place	2017 Karuizawa
Gold medal – first place	2019 Sapporo
Silver medal – second place	2020 Karuizawa
Silver medal – second place	2022 Tokoro
Bronze medal – third place	2018 Nayoro
Bronze medal – third place	2021 Wakkanai
Bronze medal – third place	2023 Tokoro

Chiaki Matsumura (松村 千秋, Chiaki Matsumura; born October 26, 1992 in Aomori) is a Japanese curler from Nagano. She was a longtime member of the Chubu Electric Power curling team from 2012 to 2023. With the team, she won five Japan Curling Championships in 2012, 2013, 2014, 2017 and 2019. At the international level, she has represented Japan three times at the World Women's Curling Championship (2013, 2019, 2022) and three times at the Pacific-Asia Curling Championships (2011, 2012, 2019), winning a silver medal in both 2012 and 2019.

== Career ==
Matsumura made her international debut at the 2011 Pacific-Asia Curling Championships as alternate on the Japanese team skipped by Satsuki Fujisawa. The team went 2–4 through the double round robin, placing them third in the preliminary round. They then lost to Korea in the semifinal and New Zealand in the bronze medal game, settling for fourth. The team returned the following season after winning the Japan Curling Championships and saw much better results. They went through the round robin of the 2012 Pacific-Asia Curling Championships with a 6–4 record, again placing third. They then defeated Korea's Kim Eun-jung in the semifinal before losing the final to China's Wang Bingyu. Their silver medal placement was enough to earn them a spot at the 2013 World Women's Curling Championship. There, the team just missed the tiebreakers with a 5–6 record. Chubu Electric Power defended their national title the following season, however would not represent Japan at the 2013 Pacific-Asia Curling Championships. In September 2013, Team Fujisawa, who had won the last three straight national championships, participated in the national trials for the 2013 Olympic Qualification Event. They lost the best-of-seven final of the trials to Ayumi Ogasawara's Sapporo-based rink in six games, which eliminated their chances of competing at the 2014 Winter Olympic Games. Team Fujisawa did participated in the 2014 Continental Cup of Curling as part of Team World, where they lost to the North Americans. In Grand Slam play, the team reached the semifinals of the 2014 Curlers Corner Autumn Gold Curling Classic, where they were eliminated by Jennifer Jones.

A few seasons later, Matsumura and her new team of Emi Shimizu, Ikue Kitazawa, Hasumi Ishigooka and Seina Nakajima won the 2017 Japan Curling Championships during the 2016–17 season. After suffering defeats to former teammate Satsuki Fujisawa's new Loco Solare rink in both the round robin and 1 vs. 2 page playoff games, the team edged Fujisawa by a score of 7–5 in the final game. Although they won the national championship, the team did not compete in the 2017 World Women's Curling Championship as Team Fujisawa failed to finish in the top two at the 2016 Pacific-Asia Curling Championships. Also during the 2016–17 season, Team Matsumura finished runner-up at the 2016 Canad Inns Women's Classic World Curling Tour event, falling in the final to Rachel Homan.

In September 2017, the 2017 Japanese Olympic Curling Trials were held between Japan's top two rinks, Loco Solare (Satsuki Fujisawa) and Chubu Electric Power (Matsumura) to determine Japan's representative in the women's event for the 2018 Winter Olympics. After splitting the first two games, Team Fujisawa won the next two games to secure a 3–1 victory in the best-of-five series. At the 2018 national championship, Team Matsumura could not defend their title as they fell in the semifinal game to Fujikyu (Tori Koana).

The following season, the team altered their lineup, moving Matsumura down to third and alternate Seina Nakajima to skip. On the tour, the team reached the final of the Hokkaido Bank Curling Classic and the semifinals of both the Red Deer Curling Classic and the Karuizawa International. At the 2019 Japan Championship, the team went undefeated through the round robin with a perfect 8–0 record. They then defeated Loco Solare again in the 1 vs. 2 game to advance to the final, where they again faced Fujisawa. In the final, Team Nakajima took four in the fifth end followed by a steal of three in the sixth, aiding them in securing their second Japanese championship. By winning the Japanese championship, Matsumura and teammates Seina Nakajima, Ikue Kitazawa, Hasumi Ishigooka and Emi Shimizu represented Japan at the 2019 World Women's Curling Championship. At the world championships, the team squeaked into the playoffs with a 6–6 record, before upsetting the third place Russian team in the quarterfinals. They then lost to Sweden in the semifinal, and lost to South Korea in the bronze medal game, settling for fourth place.

Matsumura and her team represented Japan at the 2019 Pacific-Asia Curling Championships in Shenzhen, China the following season. After going 6–1 in the round robin and defeating Hong Kong in the semifinal, they lost in the final to China's Han Yu. The team lost in the final of the Advics Cup at the start of the season, and reached the semifinals of the International Bernese Ladies Cup. At the 2020 Japan Curling Championships, Team Nakajima once again went undefeated through the round robin with an 8–0 record. They then lost in the 1 vs. 2 game to Fujisawa, before bouncing back with a semifinal victory over Hokkaido Bank Fortius (Sayaka Yoshimura). In a tight final game, Loco Solare scored a single in an extra end to win the national championship by a final score of 7–6.

Team Nakajima played in no World Curling Tour events during the abbreviated 2020–21 season as there were no events held in Japan or Asia. The team would compete in the 2021 Japan Curling Championships, held from February 8 to 14, 2021 in Wakkanai, Hokkaido. The team posted a 4–2 record through the round robin of the national championship, earning them a spot in the 3 vs. 4 page playoff game. After defeating Fujikyu in the 3 vs. 4, they lost in the semifinal to Hokkaido Bank Fortius, eliminating them from contention.

Back on tour for the 2021–22 season, Team Nakajima finished third at the 2021 Hokkaido Bank Curling Classic. Because Team Fujisawa won the 2021 Japanese Olympic Curling Trials and were representing Japan at the 2022 Winter Olympics, a world championship trial was held between Chubu Electric Power, Fujikyu and Hokkaido Bank Fortius to determine who would represent Japan at the 2022 World Women's Curling Championship. Chubu Electric posted a 3–1 record in the qualifying round, earning them a spot in the best-of-three final against Yoshimura. After splitting the first two games, the Nakajima rink took one in the tenth end of the final game to earn the berth as Team Japan at the World Championship. The team altered their lineup for the World Championship, moving Matsumura to alternate on the team. In Prince George, British Columbia, Canada for the Worlds, the Japanese team again went 6–6 through the round robin, however, it was not enough to qualify for the playoff round, and they placed seventh. The team wrapped up their season at the 2022 Japan Curling Championships. There, Chubu Electric finished 6–2 through the round robin and qualified for the playoffs as the third seed. They won the 3 vs. 4 game 12–2 over Fortius (Yoshimura) and then beat Hokkaido Bank (Tabata) 7–5 in the semifinal. In the final, they fell 7–3 to Fujisawa's Loco Solare rink.

Team Kitazawa began the 2022–23 season with a third-place finish at the 2022 Hokkaido Bank Curling Classic. While in Canada, the team had one of their most successful seasons to date, beginning with a quarterfinal finish at the 2022 Saville Shoot-Out. They then won back-to-back tour events at the 2022 Alberta Curling Series Major and the KW Fall Classic. They also reached the finals of the Prestige Hotels & Resorts Curling Classic, the Driving Force Decks Int'l Abbotsford Cashspiel and the fourth event of the 2022 Alberta Curling Series. In the new year, the team competed in the 2023 Japan Curling Championships for the chance to represent Japan at the 2023 World Women's Curling Championship. There, the team finished second through the round robin with a 6–2 record. They then lost the 1 vs. 2 game and the semifinal to Loco Solare and SC Karuizawa Club (Kanai) respectively, finishing third. Following the 2022–23 season, Matsumura left the Chubu Electric Power rink to focus on mixed doubles.

Aside from women's curling, Matsumura competes in mixed doubles curling as well with partner Yasumasa Tanida. In 2020, the pair won the Japan Mixed Doubles Curling Championship and were set to represent Japan at the 2020 World Mixed Doubles Curling Championship before it was cancelled due to COVID-19. The pair returned to the 2021 championship and reached the final, where they lost to Matsumura's brother Yuta Matsumura and his partner Yurika Yoshida. In September 2021, the 2021 Japanese mixed doubles curling Olympic trials were held to determine the team that would represent Japan at the 2021 Olympic Qualification Event for the chance to earn a berth into the 2022 Winter Olympics. After going 3–1 in the round robin stage, Matsumura and Tanida defeated Yoshida and Matsumura two games to zero in the best-of-three final to earn the right to represent Japan. At the Olympic Qualification Event, the pair just missed the playoffs after losing their final round robin game to Finland. Despite this, they were still named as the Japanese representatives for the 2022 World Mixed Doubles Curling Championship. At the Worlds, the team went 6–3 through the round robin, just missing the playoffs after losing their final round robin game to Sweden's Isabella Wranå and Rasmus Wranå. During the 2022–23 season, the team won the Madtown Doubledown on the tour, defeating Laura Walker and Kirk Muyres 7–2 in the final. Matsumura and Tanida were again chosen to represent Japan at the 2023 World Mixed Doubles Curling Championship, where they had their best showing to date. The pair finished first in their pool with an 8–1 record to qualify directly for the semifinals. They then beat Norway to reach the final where they lost to the United States' Cory Thiesse and Korey Dropkin, settling for silver.

== Personal life ==
Her brother Yuta Matsumura is also a curler. She is employed as an officer worker. She attended and graduated from Nagano Prefectural Komoro Business High School.

== Grand Slam record ==
Key
C	Champion
F	Lost in Final
SF	Lost in Semifinal
QF	Lost in Quarterfinals
R16	Lost in the round of 16
Q	Did not advance to playoffs
T2	Played in Tier 2 event
DNP	Did not participate in event
N/A	Not a Grand Slam event that season

Event	2013–14
Masters	Q

=== Former events ===
Event	2011–12	2012–13	2013–14	2014–15
Manitoba Lotteries	Q	DNP	Q	N/A
Autumn Gold	DNP	DNP	Q	SF

== Teams ==
=== Women's ===
Season	Skip	Third	Second	Lead	Alternate
2011–12	Satsuki Fujisawa	Miyo Ichikawa	Emi Shimizu	Miyuki Satoh	Chiaki Matsumura
2012–13	Satsuki Fujisawa	Miyo Ichikawa	Emi Shimizu	Chiaki Matsumura	Miyuki Satoh
2013–14	Satsuki Fujisawa	Miyo Ichikawa	Emi Shimizu	Miyuki Satoh	Chiaki Matsumura
2014–15	Satsuki Fujisawa	Emi Shimizu	Chiaki Matsumura	Ikue Kitazawa	Hasumi Ishigooka
2015–16	Emi Shimizu	Chiaki Matsumura	Hasumi Ishigooka	Ikue Kitazawa	
2016–17	Chiaki Matsumura	Emi Shimizu	Ikue Kitazawa	Hasumi Ishigooka	Seina Nakajima
2017–18	Chiaki Matsumura	Emi Shimizu	Ikue Kitazawa	Hasumi Ishigooka	Seina Nakajima
2018–19	Ikue Kitazawa (Fourth)	Chiaki Matsumura	Seina Nakajima (Skip)	Hasumi Ishigooka	Emi Shimizu
2019–20	Ikue Kitazawa (Fourth)	Chiaki Matsumura	Seina Nakajima (Skip)	Hasumi Ishigooka	Emi Shimizu
2020–21	Ikue Kitazawa (Fourth)	Chiaki Matsumura	Seina Nakajima (Skip)	Hasumi Ishigooka	Minori Suzuki
2021–22	Ikue Kitazawa	Seina Nakajima	Minori Suzuki	Hasumi Ishigooka	Chiaki Matsumura
2022–23	Ikue Kitazawa	Seina Nakajima	Minori Suzuki	Hasumi Ishigooka	Chiaki Matsumura

=== Mixed doubles ===
Season	Female	Male
2017–18	Chiaki Matsumura	Yoshiro Shimizu
2019–20	Chiaki Matsumura	Yasumasa Tanida
2020–21	Chiaki Matsumura	Yasumasa Tanida
2021–22	Chiaki Matsumura	Yasumasa Tanida
2022–23	Chiaki Matsumura	Yasumasa Tanida
2023–24	Chiaki Matsumura	Yasumasa Tanida
2024–25	Chiaki Matsumura	Yasumasa Tanida
2025–26	Chiaki Matsumura	Yasumasa Tanida
