= Minori Suzuki (curler) =

Japanese curler

- Curler
- Born: September 18, 2001 (age 25); Yokohama, Kanagawa

Team
- Curling club: Karuizawa CC, Karuizawa
- Skip: Ikue Kitazawa
- Third: Seina Nakajima
- Second: Minori Suzuki
- Lead: Hasumi Ishigooka
- Alternate: Ami Enami

Curling career
- Member Association: Japan
- World Championship: 1 (2022)
Medal record
Representing Nagano
Japan Curling Championships
Silver medal – second place	2022 Tokoro
Bronze medal – third place	2021 Wakkanai
Bronze medal – third place	2023 Tokoro
Bronze medal – third place	2024 Sapporo

Minori Suzuki (鈴木みのり, Suzuki Minori; born September 18, 2001) is a Japanese curler from Karuizawa, Nagano. She is the second on the Chubu Electric Power curling team, which is skipped by Ikue Kitazawa. At the international level, she has represented Japan twice at the World Junior Curling Championships (2019, 2020) as well as the 2022 World Women's Curling Championship.

== Career ==
At just twelve years old, Suzuki competed in her first Japan Curling Championships with her junior team of Ikue Kitazawa, Seina Nakajima, Eri Ogihara and Ayoko Tanimoto. Two years later, she returned to the championship, again with Nakajima, but with two new teammates in Ani Enami and Sae Yamamoto. At the national championship, Team Nakajima posted a 5–3 round robin record, qualifying them for the playoff round. They then lost the 3 vs. 4 game to Tori Koana and the bronze medal game to Ayumi Ogasawara, placing them fourth overall.

Nakajima aged out of juniors following the 2017–18 season and Ani Enami moved up to play skip for her team. The team was able to capture the 2018 Japan Junior Curling Championship title, qualifying them for the 2019 World Junior-B Curling Championships in January 2019 where they would need to place in the top three to secure a spot in the 2019 World Junior Curling Championships. At the event, the team went 7–2, winning the bronze medal game and securing their spot at the World Junior Championships. At the Worlds, the team struggled, finishing in ninth place overall with a 2–7 record. This finish meant that they would have to play in the B Championship in order to qualifying for the World Juniors the following year. During the 2019–20 season, her junior team, taken over by Sae Yamamoto, won the 2019 World Junior-B Curling Championships in December 2019, qualifying them once again for the 2020 World Junior Curling Championships. The team fared much better at the World Championship this time around, qualifying for the playoffs with a 5–4 record. They then lost in the semifinal to South Korea and in the bronze medal game to Russia, placing fourth at the event. Suzuki joined the Chubu Electric Power curling team, consisting of Seina Nakajima, Ikue Kitazawa, Chiaki Matsumura and Hasumi Ishigooka for the 2020–21 season.

Team Nakajima played in no World Curling Tour events during the abbreviated season as there were no events held in Japan or Asia. The team would compete in the 2021 Japan Curling Championships, held from February 8 to 14, 2021 in Wakkanai, Hokkaido. The team posted a 4–2 record through the round robin of the national championship, earning them a spot in the 3 vs. 4 page playoff game. After defeating Fujikyu in the 3 vs. 4, they lost in the semifinal to Hokkaido Bank Fortius, eliminating them from contention.

Team Nakajima finished third at the 2021 Hokkaido Bank Curling Classic. Because Team Fujisawa won the 2021 Japanese Olympic Curling Trials and were representing Japan at the 2022 Winter Olympics, a world championship trial was held between Chubu Electric Power, Fujikyu and Hokkaido Bank Fortius to determine who would represent Japan at the 2022 World Women's Curling Championship. Chubu Electric posted a 3–1 record in the qualifying round, earning them a spot in the best-of-three final against Yoshimura. After splitting the first two games, the Nakajima rink took one in the tenth end of the final game to earn the berth as Team Japan at the World Championship. The team altered their lineup for the World Championship, naming Ikue Kitazawa the new skip of the team. In Prince George, British Columbia, Canada for the Worlds, the Japanese team went 6–6 through the round robin, however, it was not enough to qualify for the playoff round, and they placed seventh. The team wrapped up their season at the 2022 Japan Curling Championships. There, Chubu Electric finished 6–2 through the round robin and qualified for the playoffs as the third seed. They won the 3 vs. 4 game 12–2 over Fortius (Yoshimura) and then beat Hokkaido Bank (Tabata) 7–5 in the semifinal. In the final, they fell 7–3 to Fujisawa's Loco Solare rink.

Team Kitazawa began the 2022–23 season with a third-place finish at the 2022 Hokkaido Bank Curling Classic. While in Canada, the team had one of their most successful seasons to date, beginning with a quarterfinal finish at the 2022 Saville Shoot-Out. They then won back-to-back tour events at the 2022 Alberta Curling Series Major and the KW Fall Classic. They also reached the finals of the Prestige Hotels & Resorts Curling Classic, the Driving Force Decks Int'l Abbotsford Cashspiel and the fourth event of the 2022 Alberta Curling Series. In the new year, the team competed in the 2023 Japan Curling Championships for the chance to represent Japan at the 2023 World Women's Curling Championship. There, the team finished second through the round robin with a 6–2 record. They then lost the 1 vs. 2 game and the semifinal to Loco Solare and SC Karuizawa Club (Kanai) respectively, finishing third.

== Personal life ==
Suzuki is employed as an office worker.

== Teams ==
Season	Skip	Third	Second	Lead	Alternate
2013–14	Ikue Kitazawa	Seina Nakajima	Minori Suzuki	Eri Ogihara	Ayoko Tanimoto
2015–16	Seina Nakajima	Minori Suzuki	Ami Enami	Sae Yamamoto	
2016–17	Ami Enami (Fourth)	Minori Suzuki	Sae Yamamoto (Skip)	Mone Ryokawa	
2017–18	Ami Enami (Fourth)	Minori Suzuki	Sae Yamamoto	Mone Ryokawa (Skip)	
2018–19	Ami Enami	Minori Suzuki	Sae Yamamoto	Mone Ryokawa	Asuka Kanai
2019–20	Minori Suzuki	Eri Ogihara	Yui Ueno	Sae Yamamoto	Miyu Ueno
2020–21	Ikue Kitazawa (Fourth)	Chiaki Matsumura	Seina Nakajima (Skip)	Hasumi Ishigooka	Minori Suzuki
2021–22	Ikue Kitazawa	Seina Nakajima	Minori Suzuki	Hasumi Ishigooka	Chiaki Matsumura
2022–23	Ikue Kitazawa	Seina Nakajima	Minori Suzuki	Hasumi Ishigooka	Chiaki Matsumura
2023–24	Ikue Kitazawa	Seina Nakajima	Ami Enami	Minori Suzuki	Hasumi Ishigooka
2024–25	Ikue Kitazawa	Seina Nakajima	Ami Enami	Minori Suzuki	Hasumi Ishigooka
2025–26	Ikue Kitazawa	Seina Nakajima	Minori Suzuki	Hasumi Ishigooka	Ami Enami
2026–27	Ikue Kitazawa	Seina Nakajima	Minori Suzuki	Hasumi Ishigooka	Ami Enami
