= Hasumi Ishigooka =

Japanese curler (born 1996)

- Curler
- Born: June 17, 1996 (age 30); Aomori, Aomori

Team
- Curling club: Karuizawa CC, Karuizawa
- Skip: Ikue Kitazawa
- Third: Seina Nakajima
- Second: Minori Suzuki
- Lead: Hasumi Ishigooka
- Alternate: Ami Enami

Curling career
- Member Association: Japan
- World Championship: 2 (2019, 2022)
- Pacific-Asia Championship: 1 (2019)
Medal record
Women's Curling
Representing Japan
Pacific-Asia Championships
| Silver medal – second place | 2019 Shenzhen |
Representing Nagano
Japan Curling Championships
| Gold medal – first place | 2017 Karuizawa |
| Gold medal – first place | 2019 Sapporo |
| Silver medal – second place | 2020 Karuizawa |
| Silver medal – second place | 2022 Tokoro |
| Bronze medal – third place | 2018 Nayoro |
| Bronze medal – third place | 2021 Wakkanai |
| Bronze medal – third place | 2023 Tokoro |
| Bronze medal – third place | 2024 Sapporo |

Hasumi Ishigooka (石郷岡 葉純, Ishigōoka Hasumi; born June 17, 1996 in Aomori) is a Japanese curler from Nagano. She currently plays lead on the Chubu Electric Power curling team, which won the Japan Curling Championships in both 2017 and 2019. At the international level, she has represented Japan twice at the World Women's Curling Championship (2019, 2022) and the 2019 Pacific-Asia Curling Championships, where she won a silver medal.

== Career ==
Ishigooka and her team of Chiaki Matsumura, Emi Shimizu, Ikue Kitazawa and Seina Nakajima broke onto the national stage during the 2016–17 season when the team won the 2017 Japan Curling Championships. After suffering defeats to the Satsuki Fujisawa rink in both the round robin and 1 vs. 2 page playoff games, the team, representing Chubu Electric Power, edged Fujisawa by a score of 7–5 in the final game. Although they won the national championship, the team did not compete in the 2017 World Women's Curling Championship as Team Fujisawa failed to finish in the top two at the 2016 Pacific-Asia Curling Championships. Also during the 2016–17 season, Team Matsumura finished runner-up at the 2016 Canad Inns Women's Classic World Curling Tour event, falling in the final to Rachel Homan.

In September 2017, the 2017 Japanese Olympic Curling Trials were held between Japan's top two rinks, Loco Solare (Satsuki Fujisawa) and Chubu Electric Power (Matsumura) to determine Japan's representative in the women's event for the 2018 Winter Olympics. After splitting the first two games, Team Fujisawa won the next two games to secure a 3–1 victory in the best-of-five series. At the 2018 national championship, Team Matsumura could not defend their title as they fell in the semifinal game to Fujikyu (Tori Koana).

The following season, the team altered their lineup, with Seina Nakajima becoming the new skip. On the tour, the team reached the final of the Hokkaido Bank Curling Classic and the semifinals of both the Red Deer Curling Classic and the Karuizawa International. At the 2019 Japan Championship, the team went undefeated through the round robin with a perfect 8–0 record. They then defeated Loco Solare again in the 1 vs. 2 game to advance to the final, where they again faced Fujisawa. In the final, Team Nakajima took four in the fifth end followed by a steal of three in the sixth, aiding them in securing their second Japanese championship. By winning the Japanese championship, Ishigooka and teammates Seina Nakajima, Ikue Kitazawa, Chiaki Matsumura and Emi Shimizu represented Japan at the 2019 World Women's Curling Championship. It was Ishigooka's first international curling event. At the world championships, the team squeaked into the playoffs with a 6–6 record, before upsetting the third place Russian team in the quarterfinals. They then lost to Sweden in the semifinal, and lost to South Korea in the bronze medal game, settling for fourth place.

Ishigooka and her team represented Japan at the 2019 Pacific-Asia Curling Championships in Shenzhen, China the following season. After going 6–1 in the round robin and defeating Hong Kong in the semifinal, they lost in the final to China's Han Yu. The team lost in the final of the Advics Cup at the start of the season, and reached the semifinals of the International Bernese Ladies Cup. At the 2020 Japan Curling Championships, Team Nakajima once again went undefeated through the round robin with an 8–0 record. They then lost in the 1 vs. 2 game to Fujisawa, before bouncing back with a semifinal victory over Hokkaido Bank Fortius (Sayaka Yoshimura). In a tight final game, Loco Solare scored a single in an extra end to win the national championship by a final score of 7–6.

Team Nakajima played in no World Curling Tour events during the abbreviated 2020–21 season as there were no events held in Japan or Asia. The team would compete in the 2021 Japan Curling Championships, held from February 8 to 14, 2021 in Wakkanai, Hokkaido. The team posted a 4–2 record through the round robin of the national championship, earning them a spot in the 3 vs. 4 page playoff game. After defeating Fujikyu in the 3 vs. 4, they lost in the semifinal to Hokkaido Bank Fortius, eliminating them from contention.

Back on tour for the 2021–22 season, Team Nakajima finished third at the 2021 Hokkaido Bank Curling Classic. Because Team Fujisawa won the 2021 Japanese Olympic Curling Trials and were representing Japan at the 2022 Winter Olympics, a world championship trial was held between Chubu Electric Power, Fujikyu and Hokkaido Bank Fortius to determine who would represent Japan at the 2022 World Women's Curling Championship. Chubu Electric posted a 3–1 record in the qualifying round, earning them a spot in the best-of-three final against Yoshimura. After splitting the first two games, the Nakajima rink took one in the tenth end of the final game to earn the berth as Team Japan at the World Championship. The team altered their lineup for the World Championship, naming Ikue Kitazawa the new skip of the team. In Prince George, British Columbia, Canada for the Worlds, the Japanese team again went 6–6 through the round robin, however, it was not enough to qualify for the playoff round, and they placed seventh. The team wrapped up their season at the 2022 Japan Curling Championships. There, Chubu Electric finished 6–2 through the round robin and qualified for the playoffs as the third seed. They won the 3 vs. 4 game 12–2 over Fortius (Yoshimura) and then beat Hokkaido Bank (Tabata) 7–5 in the semifinal. In the final, they fell 7–3 to Fujisawa's Loco Solare rink.

Team Kitazawa began the 2022–23 season with a third-place finish at the 2022 Hokkaido Bank Curling Classic. While in Canada, the team had one of their most successful seasons to date, beginning with a quarterfinal finish at the 2022 Saville Shoot-Out. They then won back-to-back tour events at the 2022 Alberta Curling Series Major and the KW Fall Classic. They also reached the finals of the Prestige Hotels & Resorts Curling Classic, the Driving Force Decks Int'l Abbotsford Cashspiel and the fourth event of the 2022 Alberta Curling Series. In the new year, the team competed in the 2023 Japan Curling Championships for the chance to represent Japan at the 2023 World Women's Curling Championship. There, the team finished second through the round robin with a 6–2 record. They then lost the 1 vs. 2 game and the semifinal to Loco Solare and SC Karuizawa Club (Kanai) respectively, finishing third.

== Personal life ==
Ishigooka is employed as an office worker.

== Teams ==
| Season | Skip | Third | Second | Lead | Alternate |
|---|---|---|---|---|---|
| 2014–15 | Satsuki Fujisawa | Emi Shimizu | Chiaki Matsumura | Ikue Kitazawa | Hasumi Ishigooka |
| 2015–16 | Emi Shimizu | Chiaki Matsumura | Hasumi Ishigooka | Ikue Kitazawa | |
| 2016–17 | Chiaki Matsumura | Emi Shimizu | Ikue Kitazawa | Hasumi Ishigooka | Seina Nakajima |
| 2017–18 | Chiaki Matsumura | Emi Shimizu | Ikue Kitazawa | Hasumi Ishigooka | Seina Nakajima |
| 2018–19 | Ikue Kitazawa (Fourth) | Chiaki Matsumura | Seina Nakajima (Skip) | Hasumi Ishigooka | Emi Shimizu |
| 2019–20 | Ikue Kitazawa (Fourth) | Chiaki Matsumura | Seina Nakajima (Skip) | Hasumi Ishigooka | Emi Shimizu |
| 2020–21 | Ikue Kitazawa (Fourth) | Chiaki Matsumura | Seina Nakajima (Skip) | Hasumi Ishigooka | Minori Suzuki |
| 2021–22 | Ikue Kitazawa | Seina Nakajima | Minori Suzuki | Hasumi Ishigooka | Chiaki Matsumura |
| 2022–23 | Ikue Kitazawa | Seina Nakajima | Minori Suzuki | Hasumi Ishigooka | Chiaki Matsumura |
| 2023–24 | Ikue Kitazawa | Seina Nakajima | Ami Enami | Minori Suzuki | Hasumi Ishigooka |
| 2024–25 | Ikue Kitazawa | Seina Nakajima | Ami Enami | Minori Suzuki | Hasumi Ishigooka |
| 2025–26 | Ikue Kitazawa | Seina Nakajima | Minori Suzuki | Hasumi Ishigooka | Ami Enami |
| 2026–27 | Ikue Kitazawa | Seina Nakajima | Minori Suzuki | Hasumi Ishigooka | Ami Enami |
