= 2021 Hokkaido Bank Curling Classic =

- Host city: Sapporo, Japan
- Arena: Hokkaido Bank Curling Stadium
- Dates: August 19–22
- Men's winner: Team Matsumura
- Curling club: Tokoro CC, Tokoro, Hokkaido
- Skip: Yuta Matsumura
- Third: Tetsuro Shimizu
- Second: Yasumasa Tanida
- Lead: Shinya Abe
- Alternate: Kosuke Aita
- Finalist: Yusuke Morozumi
- Women's winner: Team Koana
- Curling club: Curlplex Fuji, Fujiyoshida, Yamanashi
- Skip: Tori Koana
- Third: Yuna Kotani
- Second: Mao Ishigaki
- Lead: Arisa Kotani
- Finalist: Satsuki Fujisawa

The 2021 Hokkaido Bank Curling Classic was held from August 19 to 22 at the Hokkaido Bank Curling Stadium in Sapporo, Japan. It was one of the first events of the 2021–22 curling season. The total purse for the event is ¥ 1,700,000 on both the men's and women's sides.

In the men's final, the defending Japanese champions Team Consadole skipped by Yuta Matsumura defeated the Yusuke Morozumi rink TM Karuizawa 7–2. Matsumura and Morozumi also met in the final of the 2020 Japan Curling Championships, with Matsumura winning 6–4 after nine ends. Team Tsuyoshi Yamaguchi, also of Karuizawa and the junior team of Takumi Maeda also qualified for the playoffs, with Yamaguchi winning the third place game 7–4 in an extra end.

On the women's side, the Tori Koana rink, representing Fujikyu capped off a perfect 5–0 tournament by defeating Team Loco Solare skipped by Satsuki Fujisawa 5–4 in the final. Despite winning the event, Team Koana was not eligible to compete in the 2021 Japanese Olympic Curling Trials, as it was held in a best-of-five tournament between the Fujisawa rink and 2021 Japanese champions Team Sayaka Yoshimura, representing Hokkaido Bank. 2019 Japanese champions Team Seina Nakajima and Japanese junior champions Team Sae Yamamoto also qualified for the playoffs, with Nakajima taking the third place game by a score of 5–3.

== Men ==
=== Teams ===
The teams are listed as follows:

| Skip | Third | Second | Lead | Alternate | Locale |
|---|---|---|---|---|---|
| Kohsuke Hirata | Shingo Usui | Ryota Meguro | Yoshiya Miura | Syunta Kobayashi | Kitami |
| Kantaro Kawano | Takanori Hirano | Kenji Takamatsu | Yutaro Kasai | Tasuya Yokota | Sapporo |
| Takumi Maeda | Uryu Kamikawa | Hiroki Maeda | Asei Nakahara | | Kitami |
| Yuta Matsumura | Tetsuro Shimizu | Yasumasa Tanida | Shinya Abe | Kosuke Aita | Kitami |
| Yusuke Morozumi | Masaki Iwai | Ryotaro Shukuya | Kosuke Morozumi | | Karuizawa |
| Go Aoki (Fourth) | Hayato Sato (Skip) | Kei Kamada | Kazushi Nino | Ayato Sasaki | Sapporo |
| Sota Tsuruga | Haruto Ouchi | Takuto Ouchi | Naoki Kanazawa | Daishi Ikezaki | Sapporo |
| Tsuyoshi Yamaguchi | Riku Yanagisawa | Satoshi Koizumi | Takeru Yamamoto | | Karuizawa |

=== Round robin standings ===
Final Round Robin Standings

Key
| Teams to Playoffs |

| Pool A | W | L | PF | PA | DSC |
|---|---|---|---|---|---|
| Yuta Matsumura | 3 | 0 | 23 | 9 | 24.60 |
| Tsuyoshi Yamaguchi | 2 | 1 | 18 | 14 | 75.03 |
| Hayato Sato | 1 | 2 | 13 | 13 | 49.47 |
| Kantaro Kawano | 0 | 3 | 5 | 23 | 108.90 |

| Pool B | W | L | PF | PA | DSC |
|---|---|---|---|---|---|
| Yusuke Morozumi | 3 | 0 | 26 | 13 | 9.22 |
| Takumi Maeda | 2 | 1 | 18 | 15 | 58.58 |
| Sota Tsuruga | 1 | 2 | 15 | 19 | 77.28 |
| Kohsuke Hirata | 0 | 3 | 10 | 22 | 71.57 |

=== Round robin results ===
All draw times are listed in Japan Standard Time (UTC+09:00).

==== Draw 1 ====
Thursday, August 19, 3:30 pm

| Sheet B | 1 | 2 | 3 | 4 | 5 | 6 | 7 | 8 | Final |
| Yuta Matsumura | 2 | 0 | 2 | 0 | 3 | 0 | 0 | 1 | 8 |
| Tsuyoshi Yamaguchi 🔨 | 0 | 2 | 0 | 3 | 0 | 1 | 0 | 0 | 6 |

| Sheet C | 1 | 2 | 3 | 4 | 5 | 6 | 7 | 8 | Final |
| Hayato Sato 🔨 | 2 | 1 | 1 | 1 | 0 | 3 | X | X | 8 |
| Kantaro Kawano | 0 | 0 | 0 | 0 | 1 | 0 | X | X | 1 |

| Sheet D | 1 | 2 | 3 | 4 | 5 | 6 | 7 | 8 | Final |
| Takumi Maeda | 0 | 0 | 0 | 1 | 0 | 3 | 0 | 1 | 5 |
| Kohsuke Hirata 🔨 | 0 | 2 | 0 | 0 | 1 | 0 | 1 | 0 | 4 |

| Sheet E | 1 | 2 | 3 | 4 | 5 | 6 | 7 | 8 | Final |
| Sota Tsuruga | 0 | 2 | 0 | 2 | 0 | 0 | 0 | X | 4 |
| Yusuke Morozumi 🔨 | 1 | 0 | 3 | 0 | 1 | 2 | 2 | X | 9 |

==== Draw 3 ====
Friday, August 20, 10:00 am

| Sheet B | 1 | 2 | 3 | 4 | 5 | 6 | 7 | 8 | Final |
| Takumi Maeda | 0 | 1 | 0 | 1 | 0 | 3 | 1 | 0 | 6 |
| Yusuke Morozumi 🔨 | 2 | 0 | 2 | 0 | 2 | 0 | 0 | 1 | 7 |

| Sheet C | 1 | 2 | 3 | 4 | 5 | 6 | 7 | 8 | Final |
| Kohsuke Hirata | 1 | 0 | 0 | 2 | 0 | 0 | 0 | X | 3 |
| Sota Tsuruga 🔨 | 0 | 0 | 2 | 0 | 2 | 2 | 1 | X | 7 |

| Sheet D | 1 | 2 | 3 | 4 | 5 | 6 | 7 | 8 | Final |
| Yuta Matsumura | 2 | 0 | 0 | 2 | 1 | 3 | X | X | 8 |
| Kantaro Kawano 🔨 | 0 | 1 | 0 | 0 | 0 | 0 | X | X | 1 |

| Sheet E | 1 | 2 | 3 | 4 | 5 | 6 | 7 | 8 | Final |
| Tsuyoshi Yamaguchi | 0 | 1 | 0 | 0 | 3 | 0 | 0 | 1 | 5 |
| Hayato Sato 🔨 | 0 | 0 | 0 | 1 | 0 | 1 | 1 | 0 | 3 |

==== Draw 5 ====
Friday, August 20, 5:00 pm

| Sheet B | 1 | 2 | 3 | 4 | 5 | 6 | 7 | 8 | Final |
| Hayato Sato | 0 | 0 | 1 | 0 | 1 | 0 | X | X | 2 |
| Yuta Matsumura 🔨 | 3 | 0 | 0 | 3 | 0 | 1 | X | X | 7 |

| Sheet C | 1 | 2 | 3 | 4 | 5 | 6 | 7 | 8 | Final |
| Kantaro Kawano 🔨 | 1 | 0 | 1 | 0 | 0 | 1 | 0 | X | 3 |
| Tsuyoshi Yamaguchi | 0 | 2 | 0 | 2 | 1 | 0 | 2 | X | 7 |

| Sheet D | 1 | 2 | 3 | 4 | 5 | 6 | 7 | 8 | Final |
| Sota Tsuruga | 0 | 2 | 0 | 0 | 1 | 0 | 1 | X | 4 |
| Takumi Maeda 🔨 | 2 | 0 | 2 | 1 | 0 | 2 | 0 | X | 7 |

| Sheet E | 1 | 2 | 3 | 4 | 5 | 6 | 7 | 8 | Final |
| Yusuke Morozumi | 1 | 3 | 0 | 3 | 0 | 3 | X | X | 10 |
| Kohsuke Hirata 🔨 | 0 | 0 | 1 | 0 | 2 | 0 | X | X | 3 |

=== Playoffs ===
Semifinals
A1 | Yuta Matsumura | 6
B2 | Takumi Maeda | 0
B1 | Yusuke Morozumi | 10
A2 | Tsuyoshi Yamaguchi | 2

Final
A1 | Yuta Matsumura | 7
B1 | Yusuke Morozumi | 2

| Third place game |
| B2 | Takumi Maeda | 4 |
| A2 | Tsuyoshi Yamaguchi | 7 |

==== Semifinals ====
Saturday, August 21, 1:30 pm

| Sheet C | 1 | 2 | 3 | 4 | 5 | 6 | 7 | 8 | Final |
| Yuta Matsumura 🔨 | 0 | 1 | 1 | 1 | 2 | 1 | X | X | 6 |
| Takumi Maeda | 0 | 0 | 0 | 0 | 0 | 0 | X | X | 0 |

| Sheet E | 1 | 2 | 3 | 4 | 5 | 6 | 7 | 8 | Final |
| Yusuke Morozumi 🔨 | 3 | 1 | 2 | 2 | 1 | 0 | 1 | X | 10 |
| Tsuyoshi Yamaguchi | 0 | 0 | 0 | 0 | 0 | 2 | 0 | X | 2 |

==== Third place game ====
Sunday, August 22, 10:00 am

| Sheet B | 1 | 2 | 3 | 4 | 5 | 6 | 7 | 8 | 9 | Final |
| Takumi Maeda | 0 | 1 | 1 | 0 | 1 | 0 | 0 | 1 | 0 | 4 |
| Tsuyoshi Yamaguchi 🔨 | 0 | 0 | 0 | 1 | 0 | 2 | 1 | 0 | 3 | 7 |

==== Final ====
Sunday, August 22, 10:00 am

| Sheet D | 1 | 2 | 3 | 4 | 5 | 6 | 7 | 8 | Final |
| Yuta Matsumura 🔨 | 0 | 2 | 0 | 0 | 3 | 1 | 1 | X | 7 |
| Yusuke Morozumi | 0 | 0 | 2 | 0 | 0 | 0 | 0 | X | 2 |

== Women ==
=== Teams ===
The teams are listed as follows:

| Skip | Third | Second | Lead | Alternate | Locale |
|---|---|---|---|---|---|
| Satsuki Fujisawa | Chinami Yoshida | Yumi Suzuki | Yurika Yoshida | Kotomi Ishizaki | Kitami |
| Asuka Kanai | Ami Enami | Mone Ryokawa | Junko Nishimuro | | Karuizawa |
| Tori Koana | Yuna Kotani | Mao Ishigaki | Arisa Kotani | | Fujiyoshida |
| Mari Motohashi | Yako Matsuzawa | Miki Hayashi | Mayumi Saito | Ayumi Aoki | Kitami |
| Ikue Kitazawa (Fourth) | Chiaki Matsumura | Seina Nakajima (Skip) | Hasumi Ishigooka | Minori Suzuki | Karuizawa |
| Miku Nihira | Mina Kobayashi | Mikoto Nakajima | Honoka Sasaki | | Sapporo |
| Miyu Ueno (Fourth) | Eri Ogihara | Yui Ueno | Sae Yamamoto (Skip) | | Karuizawa |
| Sayaka Yoshimura | Kaho Onodera | Anna Ohmiya | Yumie Funayama | Momoha Tabata | Sapporo |

=== Round robin standings ===
Final Round Robin Standings

Key
| Teams to Playoffs |

| Pool A | W | L | PF | PA | DSC |
|---|---|---|---|---|---|
| Tori Koana | 3 | 0 | 18 | 13 | 37.83 |
| Sae Yamamoto | 2 | 1 | 18 | 13 | 32.37 |
| Sayaka Yoshimura | 1 | 2 | 16 | 15 | 93.23 |
| Mari Motohashi | 0 | 3 | 11 | 22 | 58.92 |

| Pool B | W | L | PF | PA | DSC |
|---|---|---|---|---|---|
| Satsuki Fujisawa | 3 | 0 | 26 | 8 | 21.20 |
| Seina Nakajima | 2 | 1 | 16 | 11 | 38.93 |
| Asuka Kanai | 1 | 2 | 11 | 24 | 31.18 |
| Miku Nihira | 0 | 3 | 15 | 25 | 92.53 |

=== Round robin results ===
All draw times are listed in Japan Standard Time (UTC+09:00).

==== Draw 2 ====
Thursday, August 19, 7:00 pm

| Sheet B | 1 | 2 | 3 | 4 | 5 | 6 | 7 | 8 | Final |
| Sayaka Yoshimura | 1 | 0 | 1 | 0 | 1 | 0 | 2 | 1 | 6 |
| Mari Motohashi 🔨 | 0 | 1 | 0 | 0 | 0 | 2 | 0 | 0 | 3 |

| Sheet C | 1 | 2 | 3 | 4 | 5 | 6 | 7 | 8 | Final |
| Sae Yamamoto | 1 | 0 | 0 | 1 | 0 | 0 | 1 | 0 | 3 |
| Tori Koana 🔨 | 0 | 1 | 2 | 0 | 0 | 1 | 0 | 1 | 5 |

| Sheet D | 1 | 2 | 3 | 4 | 5 | 6 | 7 | 8 | Final |
| Satsuki Fujisawa 🔨 | 1 | 1 | 0 | 1 | 4 | 3 | X | X | 10 |
| Asuka Kanai | 0 | 0 | 1 | 0 | 0 | 0 | X | X | 1 |

| Sheet E | 1 | 2 | 3 | 4 | 5 | 6 | 7 | 8 | Final |
| Miku Nihira | 1 | 0 | 0 | 1 | 0 | 1 | 1 | 0 | 4 |
| Seina Nakajima 🔨 | 0 | 1 | 1 | 0 | 1 | 0 | 0 | 3 | 6 |

==== Draw 4 ====
Friday, August 20, 1:30 pm

| Sheet B | 1 | 2 | 3 | 4 | 5 | 6 | 7 | 8 | Final |
| Satsuki Fujisawa 🔨 | 0 | 1 | 0 | 0 | 1 | 2 | 0 | 1 | 5 |
| Seina Nakajima | 0 | 0 | 0 | 1 | 0 | 0 | 2 | 0 | 3 |

| Sheet C | 1 | 2 | 3 | 4 | 5 | 6 | 7 | 8 | 9 | Final |
| Asuka Kanai 🔨 | 0 | 2 | 0 | 0 | 3 | 1 | 0 | 1 | 1 | 8 |
| Miku Nihira | 3 | 0 | 1 | 1 | 0 | 0 | 1 | 0 | 0 | 7 |

| Sheet D | 1 | 2 | 3 | 4 | 5 | 6 | 7 | 8 | 9 | Final |
| Sayaka Yoshimura | 0 | 1 | 0 | 0 | 2 | 1 | 1 | 0 | 0 | 5 |
| Sae Yamamoto 🔨 | 1 | 0 | 1 | 2 | 0 | 0 | 0 | 1 | 1 | 6 |

| Sheet E | 1 | 2 | 3 | 4 | 5 | 6 | 7 | 8 | Final |
| Mari Motohashi 🔨 | 0 | 1 | 0 | 0 | 2 | 0 | 2 | 0 | 5 |
| Tori Koana | 0 | 0 | 1 | 4 | 0 | 1 | 0 | 1 | 7 |

==== Draw 6 ====
Saturday, August 21, 10:00 am

| Sheet B | 1 | 2 | 3 | 4 | 5 | 6 | 7 | 8 | 9 | Final |
| Tori Koana 🔨 | 1 | 0 | 0 | 2 | 0 | 0 | 2 | 0 | 1 | 6 |
| Sayaka Yoshimura | 0 | 2 | 1 | 0 | 0 | 1 | 0 | 1 | 0 | 5 |

| Sheet C | 1 | 2 | 3 | 4 | 5 | 6 | 7 | 8 | Final |
| Mari Motohashi | 0 | 0 | 0 | 0 | 3 | 0 | X | X | 3 |
| Sae Yamamoto 🔨 | 0 | 3 | 1 | 3 | 0 | 2 | X | X | 9 |

| Sheet D | 1 | 2 | 3 | 4 | 5 | 6 | 7 | 8 | Final |
| Miku Nihira | 0 | 2 | 0 | 0 | 2 | 0 | 0 | X | 4 |
| Satsuki Fujisawa 🔨 | 4 | 0 | 2 | 0 | 0 | 2 | 3 | X | 11 |

| Sheet E | 1 | 2 | 3 | 4 | 5 | 6 | 7 | 8 | Final |
| Seina Nakajima | 0 | 0 | 2 | 1 | 1 | 1 | 2 | X | 7 |
| Asuka Kanai 🔨 | 0 | 2 | 0 | 0 | 0 | 0 | 0 | X | 2 |

=== Playoffs ===
Semifinals
A1 | Tori Koana | 6
B2 | Seina Nakajima | 4
B1 | Satsuki Fujisawa | 7
A2 | Sae Yamamoto | 4

Final
A1 | Tori Koana | 5
B1 | Satsuki Fujisawa | 4

| Third place game |
| B2 | Seina Nakajima | 5 |
| A2 | Sae Yamamoto | 3 |

==== Semifinals ====
Saturday, August 21, 5:00 pm

| Sheet B | 1 | 2 | 3 | 4 | 5 | 6 | 7 | 8 | Final |
| Tori Koana 🔨 | 1 | 0 | 0 | 2 | 2 | 0 | 0 | 1 | 6 |
| Seina Nakajima | 0 | 1 | 1 | 0 | 0 | 1 | 1 | 0 | 4 |

| Sheet D | 1 | 2 | 3 | 4 | 5 | 6 | 7 | 8 | Final |
| Satsuki Fujisawa 🔨 | 0 | 2 | 0 | 2 | 0 | 3 | 0 | X | 7 |
| Sae Yamamoto | 0 | 0 | 1 | 0 | 2 | 0 | 1 | X | 4 |

==== Third place game ====
Sunday, August 22, 4:00 pm

| Sheet B | 1 | 2 | 3 | 4 | 5 | 6 | 7 | 8 | Final |
| Seina Nakajima | 0 | 1 | 0 | 2 | 0 | 2 | 0 | X | 5 |
| Sae Yamamoto 🔨 | 0 | 0 | 1 | 0 | 1 | 0 | 1 | X | 3 |

==== Final ====
Sunday, August 22, 4:00 pm

| Sheet D | 1 | 2 | 3 | 4 | 5 | 6 | 7 | 8 | Final |
| Tori Koana | 0 | 0 | 1 | 1 | 2 | 0 | 0 | 1 | 5 |
| Satsuki Fujisawa 🔨 | 0 | 1 | 0 | 0 | 0 | 2 | 1 | 0 | 4 |
