= 2022 Alberta Curling Series Major =

Curling event in Canada

2022 Curling Stadium Alberta Curling Series Major
- Host city: Leduc, Alberta
- Arena: Leduc Recreation Centre
- Dates: September 9–12 (Men's); September 15–18 (Women's)
- Men's winner: (Switzerland) Team Schwaller
- Curling club: CC Genève, Geneva
- Skip: Yannick Schwaller
- Fourth: Benoît Schwarz
- Second: Sven Michel
- Lead: Pablo Lachat
- Finalist: (Manitoba) Reid Carruthers
- Women's winner: (Japan) Team Kitazawa
- Curling club: Karuizawa CC, Karuizawa
- Skip: Ikue Kitazawa
- Third: Seina Nakajima
- Second: Minori Suzuki
- Lead: Hasumi Ishigooka
- Alternate: Chiaki Matsumura
- Finalist: (Switzerland) Team Keiser

The 2022 Curling Stadium Alberta Curling Series Major was held from September 9 to 18 at the Leduc Recreation Centre in Leduc, Alberta. The men's event ran from September 9 to 12 and the women's event went from September 15 to 18. It was the major men's and women's event held as part of the Alberta Curling Series for the 2022–23 curling season. The total purse for the event was $27,000 on the men's side and $15,750 on the women's side.

The event was sponsored by Curling Stadium, a streaming service provided by CurlingZone. All of the games were streamed on CurlingZone and the Alberta Curling Series' YouTube page.

== Men ==
=== Teams ===
The teams are listed as follows:

Skip	Third	Second	Lead	Alternate	Locale
Cole Adams	Riley Helston	Benjamin Helston	Braden Pelech		Calgary, Alberta
Michael Brunner	Romano Meier	Anthony Petoud	Marcel Käufeler		Bern, Switzerland
Jason Camm	Ian Dickie	Zack Shurtleff	Punit Sthankiya		Cornwall, Ontario
Reid Carruthers	Jason Gunnlaugson	Derek Samagalski	Connor Njegovan		Winnipeg, Manitoba
Warren Cross	Tyler Pfiffer	Morgan Van Doesburg	Mike Lambert		Edmonton, Alberta
Korey Dropkin	Andrew Stopera	Mark Fenner	Thomas Howell		(United States) Duluth, Minnesota
Scott Dunnam	Cody Clouser	Lance Wheeler	Andrew Dunnam		(United States) Philadelphia, Pennsylvania
John Epping	Mat Camm	Pat Janssen	Scott Chadwick		Toronto, Ontario
Riley Fenson	Samuel Strouse	Connor Kauffman	Aidan Oldenburg	Jacob Zeman	(United States) Bemidji, Minnesota
Jacques Gauthier	Sterling Middleton	Jason Ginter	Alex Horvath		Victoria, British Columbia
Marco Hösli	Philipp Hösli	Marco Hefti	Justin Hausherr		Glarus, Switzerland
Tanner Horgan	Darren Moulding	Jacob Horgan	Colin Hodgson		Sudbury, Ontario
Kyler Kleibrink	Dustin Kalthoff	Chris Kennedy	Evan van Amsterdam		Calgary, Alberta
Rylan Kleiter	Joshua Mattern	Trevor Johnson	Matthieu Taillon		Saskatoon, Saskatchewan
Mike McEwen	Ryan Fry	Jonathan Beuk	Brent Laing		Toronto, Ontario
Dallan Muyres	Garret Springer	Jordan Tardi	Dustin Mikush		Saskatoon, Saskatchewan
Sébastien Robillard	Daniel Wenzek	Richard Krell	Nathan Small		Port Coquitlam, British Columbia
Benoît Schwarz (Fourth)	Yannick Schwaller (Skip)	Sven Michel	Pablo Lachat		Geneva, Switzerland
Aaron Sluchinski	Jeremy Harty	Kerr Drummond	Dylan Webster		Calgary, Alberta
Jan Hess (Fourth)	Yves Stocker (Skip)	Simon Gloor	Felix Eberhard		Zug, Switzerland
Karsten Sturmay	J. D. Lind	Kyle Doering	Glenn Venance	Kurtis Goller	Edmonton, Alberta
Johnson Tao	Jaedon Neuert	Benjamin Morin	Owen Fenske		Edmonton, Alberta
Ryan Wiebe	Ty Dilello	Sean Flatt	Adam Flatt		Winnipeg, Manitoba
Riku Yanagisawa	Tsuyoshi Yamaguchi	Takeru Yamamoto	Satoshi Koizumi		Karuizawa, Japan

=== Knockout brackets ===
==== A event ====
First Knockout				Qualifier 1
(Manitoba) Reid Carruthers	8
(United States) Riley Fenson	4	(Manitoba) Reid Carruthers	3
(Saskatchewan) Dallan Muyres	2	(British Columbia) Jacques Gauthier	7
(British Columbia) Jacques Gauthier	7			(British Columbia) Jacques Gauthier	4
(Ontario) Mike McEwen	4			(Ontario) John Epping	6
(United States) Scott Dunnam	5	(United States) Scott Dunnam	5
(Ontario) John Epping	5	(Ontario) John Epping	9
(Saskatchewan) Rylan Kleiter	3

First Knockout				Qualifier 2
(Switzerland) Michael Brunner	4
(Japan) Riku Yanagisawa	5	(Japan) Riku Yanagisawa	2
(Alberta) Kyler Kleibrink	4	(Manitoba) Ryan Wiebe	1
(Manitoba) Ryan Wiebe	5			(Japan) Riku Yanagisawa	5
(United States) Korey Dropkin	8			(Ontario) Tanner Horgan	3
(Ontario) Jason Camm	6	(United States) Korey Dropkin	4
(Ontario) Tanner Horgan	6	(Ontario) Tanner Horgan	7
(British Columbia) Sébastien Robillard	3

First Knockout				Qualifier 3
(Switzerland) Marco Hösli	11
(Alberta) Warren Cross	1	(Switzerland) Marco Hösli	6
(Alberta) Karsten Sturmay	7	(Alberta) Karsten Sturmay	4
(Alberta) Johnson Tao	2			(Switzerland) Marco Hösli	4
(Switzerland) Yves Stocker	3			(Alberta) Aaron Sluchinski	3
(Alberta) Aaron Sluchinski	7	(Alberta) Aaron Sluchinski	4
(Switzerland) Yannick Schwaller	8	(Switzerland) Yannick Schwaller	2
(Alberta) Cole Adams	2

==== B event ====
Second Knockout	Qualifier 4
(Alberta) Karsten Sturmay	8
(United States) Riley Fenson	7	(United States) Riley Fenson	2
(Saskatchewan) Dallan Muyres	6	(Alberta) Karsten Sturmay	2
(Switzerland) Yannick Schwaller	7
(Switzerland) Yannick Schwaller	6
(Ontario) Mike McEwen	7	(Ontario) Mike McEwen	0
(Saskatchewan) Rylan Kleiter	4	(Switzerland) Yannick Schwaller	7
(Ontario) Tanner Horgan	4

Second Knockout	Qualifier 5
(Manitoba) Reid Carruthers	8
(Switzerland) Michael Brunner	4	(Switzerland) Michael Brunner	3
(Alberta) Kyler Kleibrink	2	(Manitoba) Reid Carruthers	10
(United States) Scott Dunnam	5
(United States) Scott Dunnam	4
(Ontario) Jason Camm	9	(Ontario) Jason Camm	3
(British Columbia) Sébastien Robillard	6	(Manitoba) Reid Carruthers	2
(Alberta) Aaron Sluchinski	6

Second Knockout	Qualifier 6
(Manitoba) Ryan Wiebe	8
(Alberta) Warren Cross	0	(Alberta) Johnson Tao	1
(Alberta) Johnson Tao	7	(Manitoba) Ryan Wiebe	8
(United States) Korey Dropkin	6
(United States) Korey Dropkin	5
(Switzerland) Yves Stocker	1	(Alberta) Cole Adams	2
(Alberta) Cole Adams	7	(Manitoba) Ryan Wiebe	5
(British Columbia) Jacques Gauthier	2

==== C event ====
Third Knockout	Qualifier 7
(United States) Riley Fenson	1
(Ontario) Mike McEwen	8
(Ontario) Mike McEwen	2
(Switzerland) Michael Brunner	6	(United States) Korey Dropkin	4
(Ontario) Jason Camm	1	(Switzerland) Michael Brunner	5
(United States) Korey Dropkin	6
(United States) Korey Dropkin	4
(Manitoba) Reid Carruthers	5
(Alberta) Karsten Sturmay	8
(Alberta) Johnson Tao	6	(Alberta) Johnson Tao	4
(Alberta) Cole Adams	2	(Alberta) Karsten Sturmay	2
(Manitoba) Reid Carruthers	7

Third Knockout	Qualifier 8
(British Columbia) Jacques Gauthier	2
(Saskatchewan) Dallan Muyres	3	(Saskatchewan) Rylan Kleiter	8
(Saskatchewan) Rylan Kleiter	10	(Saskatchewan) Rylan Kleiter	5
(United States) Scott Dunnam	4
(Saskatchewan) Rylan Kleiter	3
(Ontario) Tanner Horgan	5
(Ontario) Tanner Horgan	8
(Alberta) Kyler Kleibrink	7	(Alberta) Kyler Kleibrink	4
(British Columbia) Sébastien Robillard	4	(Alberta) Kyler Kleibrink	7
(Alberta) Warren Cross	4	(Switzerland) Yves Stocker	4
(Switzerland) Yves Stocker	7

=== Knockout results ===
All draw times are listed in Mountain Time (UTC−06:00).

==== Draw 1 ====
Friday, September 9, 9:30 am

Sheet 3	1	2	3	4	5	6	7	8	Final
(Alberta) Karsten Sturmay	0	0	2	1	2	2	X	X	7
(Alberta) Johnson Tao 🔨	1	1	0	0	0	0	X	X	2

Sheet 4	1	2	3	4	5	6	7	8	Final
(Switzerland) Marco Hösli	0	3	4	4	X	X	X	X	11
(Alberta) Warren Cross 🔨	1	0	0	0	X	X	X	X	1

Sheet 5	1	2	3	4	5	6	7	8	Final
(Ontario) Tanner Horgan 🔨	0	1	3	0	0	0	2	X	6
(British Columbia) Sébastien Robillard	0	0	0	2	0	1	0	X	3

Sheet 6	1	2	3	4	5	6	7	8	Final
(United States) Korey Dropkin 🔨	1	0	2	0	2	0	2	1	8
(Ontario) Jason Camm	0	4	0	0	0	2	0	0	6

Sheet 7	1	2	3	4	5	6	7	8	Final
(Switzerland) Yannick Schwaller 🔨	1	0	2	2	0	3	X	X	8
(Alberta) Cole Adams	0	1	0	0	1	0	X	X	2

Sheet 8	1	2	3	4	5	6	7	8	Final
(Switzerland) Yves Stocker	1	0	0	2	0	0	X	X	3
(Alberta) Aaron Sluchinski 🔨	0	2	1	0	0	4	X	X	7

==== Draw 2 ====
Friday, September 9, 1:00 pm

Sheet 3	1	2	3	4	5	6	7	8	Final
(Manitoba) Reid Carruthers	0	3	0	4	0	1	X	X	8
(United States) Riley Fenson 🔨	2	0	1	0	1	0	X	X	4

Sheet 4	1	2	3	4	5	6	7	8	Final
(Saskatchewan) Dallan Muyres 🔨	0	1	0	0	1	0	0	X	2
(British Columbia) Jacques Gauthier	1	0	2	1	0	2	1	X	7

Sheet 5	1	2	3	4	5	6	7	8	Final
(Ontario) Mike McEwen 🔨	0	2	0	1	0	0	1	0	4
(United States) Scott Dunnam	1	0	1	0	1	1	0	1	5

Sheet 6	1	2	3	4	5	6	7	8	Final
(Ontario) John Epping	1	0	0	0	1	1	1	1	5
(Saskatchewan) Rylan Kleiter 🔨	0	1	1	1	0	0	0	0	3

Sheet 7	1	2	3	4	5	6	7	8	9	Final
(Switzerland) Michael Brunner 🔨	2	0	0	0	0	1	0	1	0	4
(Japan) Riku Yanagisawa	0	2	0	1	0	0	1	0	1	5

Sheet 8	1	2	3	4	5	6	7	8	Final
(Alberta) Kyler Kleibrink 🔨	0	1	0	1	0	0	2	0	4
(Manitoba) Ryan Wiebe	0	0	1	0	1	2	0	1	5

==== Draw 3 ====
Friday, September 9, 4:30 pm

Sheet 3	1	2	3	4	5	6	7	8	Final
(Alberta) Aaron Sluchinski 🔨	0	1	0	0	1	1	0	1	4
(Switzerland) Yannick Schwaller	0	0	1	0	0	0	1	0	2

Sheet 4	1	2	3	4	5	6	7	8	Final
(Switzerland) Yves Stocker	0	1	0	0	0	0	X	X	1
(Alberta) Cole Adams 🔨	0	0	2	0	3	2	X	X	7

Sheet 5	1	2	3	4	5	6	7	8	Final
(Switzerland) Marco Hösli 🔨	0	1	1	0	0	3	0	1	6
(Alberta) Karsten Sturmay	1	0	0	1	1	0	1	0	4

Sheet 6	1	2	3	4	5	6	7	8	Final
(Alberta) Warren Cross	0	0	0	0	0	0	X	X	0
(Alberta) Johnson Tao 🔨	0	2	0	1	2	2	X	X	7

Sheet 7	1	2	3	4	5	6	7	8	Final
(Ontario) Jason Camm	0	4	0	3	1	0	1	X	9
(British Columbia) Sébastien Robillard 🔨	2	0	2	0	0	2	0	X	6

Sheet 8	1	2	3	4	5	6	7	8	Final
(United States) Korey Dropkin	1	0	0	2	0	1	0	0	4
(Ontario) Tanner Horgan 🔨	0	2	0	0	2	0	2	1	7

==== Draw 4 ====
Friday, September 9, 8:00 pm

Sheet 3	1	2	3	4	5	6	7	8	Final
(Switzerland) Michael Brunner 🔨	0	0	0	0	3	0	1	X	4
(Alberta) Kyler Kleibrink	0	0	0	1	0	1	0	X	2

Sheet 4	1	2	3	4	5	6	7	8	Final
(United States) Scott Dunnam	0	1	0	0	1	3	0	0	5
(Ontario) John Epping 🔨	0	0	1	3	0	0	3	2	9

Sheet 5	1	2	3	4	5	6	7	8	Final
(Manitoba) Reid Carruthers 🔨	1	0	0	0	0	2	0	X	3
(British Columbia) Jacques Gauthier	0	2	0	1	1	0	3	X	7

Sheet 6	1	2	3	4	5	6	7	8	Final
(Japan) Riku Yanagisawa	0	0	0	1	0	0	0	1	2
(Manitoba) Ryan Wiebe 🔨	0	0	0	0	0	1	0	0	1

Sheet 7	1	2	3	4	5	6	7	8	Final
(Ontario) Mike McEwen	0	1	2	2	0	1	1	X	7
(Saskatchewan) Rylan Kleiter 🔨	3	0	0	0	1	0	0	X	4

Sheet 8	1	2	3	4	5	6	7	8	9	Final
(United States) Riley Fenson 🔨	0	2	0	0	0	0	3	1	1	7
(Saskatchewan) Dallan Muyres	1	0	2	1	1	1	0	0	0	6

==== Draw 5 ====
Saturday, September 10, 9:30 am

Sheet 3	1	2	3	4	5	6	7	8	Final
(United States) Korey Dropkin	0	0	1	1	0	2	0	1	5
(Alberta) Cole Adams 🔨	0	1	0	0	1	0	0	0	2

Sheet 4	1	2	3	4	5	6	7	8	Final
(Manitoba) Ryan Wiebe 🔨	0	1	0	1	3	3	X	X	8
(Alberta) Johnson Tao	0	0	1	0	0	0	X	X	1

Sheet 5	1	2	3	4	5	6	7	8	Final
(Switzerland) Yannick Schwaller 🔨	0	3	1	2	X	X	X	X	6
(Ontario) Mike McEwen	0	0	0	0	X	X	X	X	0

Sheet 6	1	2	3	4	5	6	7	8	Final
(Alberta) Karsten Sturmay	0	0	3	1	2	0	2	X	8
(United States) Riley Fenson 🔨	0	1	0	0	0	1	0	X	2

Sheet 7	1	2	3	4	5	6	7	8	Final
(Manitoba) Reid Carruthers	0	0	3	1	0	4	X	X	8
(Switzerland) Michael Brunner 🔨	0	1	0	0	2	0	X	X	3

Sheet 8	1	2	3	4	5	6	7	8	Final
(United States) Scott Dunnam 🔨	0	2	1	0	0	1	0	0	4
(Ontario) Jason Camm	0	0	0	0	1	0	1	1	3

==== Draw 6 ====
Saturday, September 10, 1:00 pm

Sheet 3	1	2	3	4	5	6	7	8	Final
(Manitoba) Reid Carruthers 🔨	2	0	2	0	2	0	4	X	10
(United States) Scott Dunnam	0	2	0	2	0	1	0	X	5

Sheet 4	1	2	3	4	5	6	7	8	Final
(Japan) Riku Yanagisawa 🔨	0	1	2	0	0	2	0	X	5
(Ontario) Tanner Horgan	0	0	0	2	0	0	1	X	3

Sheet 5	1	2	3	4	5	6	7	8	Final
(Manitoba) Ryan Wiebe	0	2	0	4	0	1	1	0	8
(United States) Korey Dropkin 🔨	2	0	2	0	1	0	0	1	6

Sheet 6	1	2	3	4	5	6	7	8	Final
(Switzerland) Marco Hösli 🔨	2	1	0	0	1	0	0	X	4
(Alberta) Aaron Sluchinski	0	0	1	0	0	1	1	X	3

Sheet 7	1	2	3	4	5	6	7	8	Final
(British Columbia) Jacques Gauthier	0	0	0	2	0	1	0	1	4
(Ontario) John Epping 🔨	0	2	0	0	1	0	3	0	6

Sheet 8	1	2	3	4	5	6	7	8	Final
(Alberta) Karsten Sturmay	0	2	0	0	X	X	X	X	2
(Switzerland) Yannick Schwaller 🔨	1	0	2	4	X	X	X	X	7

==== Draw 7 ====
Saturday, September 10, 4:30 pm

Sheet 3	1	2	3	4	5	6	7	8	Final
(Alberta) Warren Cross	0	0	1	0	1	0	2	0	4
(Switzerland) Yves Stocker 🔨	0	3	0	1	0	2	0	1	7

Sheet 4	1	2	3	4	5	6	7	8	Final
(Alberta) Kyler Kleibrink 🔨	2	1	0	1	0	1	0	2	7
(British Columbia) Sébastien Robillard	0	0	2	0	1	0	1	0	4

Sheet 5	1	2	3	4	5	6	7	8	Final
(Switzerland) Michael Brunner 🔨	2	0	0	3	1	X	X	X	6
(Ontario) Jason Camm	0	1	0	0	0	X	X	X	1

Sheet 6	1	2	3	4	5	6	7	8	Final
(Saskatchewan) Dallan Muyres	0	2	0	0	1	0	X	X	3
(Saskatchewan) Rylan Kleiter 🔨	2	0	3	1	0	4	X	X	10

Sheet 7	1	2	3	4	5	6	7	8	Final
(Alberta) Johnson Tao 🔨	2	0	0	3	0	0	1	X	6
(Alberta) Cole Adams	0	1	0	0	0	1	0	X	2

==== Draw 8 ====
Saturday, September 10, 8:00 pm

Sheet 1	1	2	3	4	5	6	7	8	9	Final
(Switzerland) Michael Brunner 🔨	0	0	0	1	0	2	0	2	0	5
(United States) Korey Dropkin	2	0	0	0	2	0	1	0	1	6

Sheet 2	1	2	3	4	5	6	7	8	9	Final
(Saskatchewan) Rylan Kleiter	0	0	2	1	0	0	1	0	1	5
(United States) Scott Dunnam 🔨	0	1	0	0	1	1	0	1	0	4

Sheet 3	1	2	3	4	5	6	7	8	Final
(Switzerland) Yannick Schwaller 🔨	0	2	0	3	0	0	2	X	7
(Ontario) Tanner Horgan	0	0	2	0	2	0	0	X	4

Sheet 4	1	2	3	4	5	6	7	8	Final
(Alberta) Karsten Sturmay 🔨	0	2	0	1	0	0	3	2	8
(Alberta) Johnson Tao	1	0	1	0	0	2	0	0	4

Sheet 5	1	2	3	4	5	6	7	8	Final
(Manitoba) Reid Carruthers	0	1	0	1	0	0	X	X	2
(Alberta) Aaron Sluchinski 🔨	1	0	2	0	2	1	X	X	6

Sheet 6	1	2	3	4	5	6	7	8	Final
(Manitoba) Ryan Wiebe 🔨	1	0	0	2	0	1	0	1	5
(British Columbia) Jacques Gauthier	0	0	2	0	0	0	0	0	2

Sheet 7	1	2	3	4	5	6	7	8	Final
(Alberta) Kyler Kleibrink 🔨	1	0	0	1	2	0	2	1	7
(Switzerland) Yves Stocker	0	1	1	0	0	2	0	0	4

Sheet 8	1	2	3	4	5	6	7	8	Final
(United States) Riley Fenson	0	0	1	0	0	X	X	X	1
(Ontario) Mike McEwen 🔨	0	3	0	4	1	X	X	X	8

==== Draw 9 ====
Sunday, September 11, 10:00 am

Sheet 4	1	2	3	4	5	6	7	8	Final
(British Columbia) Jacques Gauthier	0	0	0	1	0	1	X	X	2
(Saskatchewan) Rylan Kleiter 🔨	0	2	1	0	3	0	X	X	6

Sheet 6	1	2	3	4	5	6	7	8	Final
(Ontario) Tanner Horgan 🔨	2	0	0	0	1	0	5	X	8
(Alberta) Kyler Kleibrink	0	0	0	2	0	2	0	X	4

Sheet 7	1	2	3	4	5	6	7	8	Final
(Manitoba) Mike McEwen	0	0	0	1	0	0	1	0	2
(United States) Korey Dropkin 🔨	0	0	2	0	0	1	0	1	4

Sheet 8	1	2	3	4	5	6	7	8	Final
(Alberta) Karsten Sturmay 🔨	1	0	1	0	X	X	X	X	2
(Manitoba) Reid Carruthers	0	3	0	4	X	X	X	X	7

==== Draw 10 ====
Sunday, September 11, 2:00 pm

Sheet 3	1	2	3	4	5	6	7	8	Final
(Saskatchewan) Rylan Kleiter	0	1	0	0	0	1	1	0	3
(Ontario) Tanner Horgan 🔨	0	0	1	1	2	0	0	1	5

Sheet 5	1	2	3	4	5	6	7	8	9	Final
(United States) Korey Dropkin	0	0	1	0	1	0	0	2	0	4
(Manitoba) Reid Carruthers 🔨	2	0	0	1	0	1	0	0	1	5

=== Playoffs ===
Quarterfinals
1	(Ontario) John Epping	7
8	(Ontario) Tanner Horgan	3
4	(Switzerland) Yannick Schwaller	7
5	(Alberta) Aaron Sluchinski	2
3	(Switzerland) Marco Hösli	4
6	(Manitoba) Ryan Wiebe	5
7	(Manitoba) Reid Carruthers	6
2	(Japan) Riku Yanagisawa	2

Semifinals
1	(Ontario) John Epping	4
4	(Switzerland) Yannick Schwaller	5
6	(Manitoba) Ryan Wiebe	2
7	(Manitoba) Reid Carruthers	5

Final
4	(Switzerland) Yannick Schwaller	5
7	(Manitoba) Reid Carruthers	4

==== Quarterfinals ====
Sunday, September 11, 7:00 pm

Sheet 4	1	2	3	4	5	6	7	8	Final
(Switzerland) Marco Hösli 🔨	2	0	0	1	0	0	1	0	4
(Manitoba) Ryan Wiebe	0	1	1	0	2	0	0	1	5

Sheet 5	1	2	3	4	5	6	7	8	Final
(Ontario) John Epping 🔨	0	0	0	1	0	3	0	3	7
(Ontario) Tanner Horgan	0	1	0	0	1	0	1	0	3

Sheet 6	1	2	3	4	5	6	7	8	Final
(Manitoba) Reid Carruthers	4	0	0	2	0	X	X	X	6
(Japan) Riku Yanagisawa 🔨	0	1	0	0	1	X	X	X	2

Sheet 7	1	2	3	4	5	6	7	8	Final
(Switzerland) Yannick Schwaller	0	1	0	3	2	1	X	X	7
(Alberta) Aaron Sluchinski 🔨	1	0	1	0	0	0	X	X	2

==== Semifinals ====
Monday, September 12, 10:00 am

Sheet 4	1	2	3	4	5	6	7	8	9	Final
(Ontario) John Epping 🔨	0	2	0	0	1	0	1	0	0	4
(Switzerland) Yannick Schwaller	0	0	0	1	0	1	0	2	1	5

Sheet 5	1	2	3	4	5	6	7	8	Final
(Manitoba) Ryan Wiebe 🔨	0	0	1	0	0	1	0	X	2
(Manitoba) Reid Carruthers	2	0	0	0	2	0	1	X	5

==== Final ====
Monday, September 12, 1:30 pm

Sheet 6	1	2	3	4	5	6	7	8	Final
(Switzerland) Yannick Schwaller 🔨	0	2	1	0	1	0	0	1	5
(Manitoba) Reid Carruthers	0	0	0	2	0	2	0	0	4

== Women ==
=== Teams ===
The teams are listed as follows:

Skip	Third	Second	Lead	Alternate	Locale
Corryn Brown	Erin Pincott	Dezaray Hawes	Samantha Fisher		Kamloops, British Columbia
Elysa Crough	Quinn Prodaniuk	Kim Bonneau	Julianna Mackenzie		Edmonton, Alberta
Gim Eun-ji	Kim Min-ji	Kim Su-ji	Seol Ye-eun	Seol Ye-ji	Uijeongbu, South Korea
Clancy Grandy	Kayla MacMillan	Lindsay Dubue	Sarah Loken		Vancouver, British Columbia
Ha Seung-youn	Kim Hye-rin	Yang Tae-i	Kim Su-jin		Chuncheon, South Korea
Krysta Hilker	Kim Curtin	Sydney Steinke	Claire Murray		Edmonton, Alberta
Jessie Hunkin	Kristen Streifel	Becca Hebert	Dayna Demers		Spruce Grove, Alberta
Selina Witschonke	Elena Mathis	Marina Lörtscher (Note: Team Raphaela Keiser played with three players.)	–		St. Moritz, Switzerland
Ikue Kitazawa	Seina Nakajima	Minori Suzuki	Hasumi Ishigooka	Chiaki Matsumura	Nagano, Japan
Kristie Moore	Susan O'Connor	Janais DeJong	Valerie Ekelund		Sexsmith, Alberta
Lisa Parent	Sophie Brissette	Kaitlin Zeller	Megan Johnson		Calgary, Alberta
Casey Scheidegger	Kate Hogan	Jessie Haughian	Taylor McDonald		Lethbridge, Alberta
Kayla Skrlik	Geri-Lynn Ramsay	Brittany Tran	Ashton Skrlik		Calgary, Alberta
Kellie Stiksma	Nicole Larson	Jamie Scott	Bailey Horte		Edmonton, Alberta

=== Knockout brackets ===
==== A event ====
First Knockout	Qualifier 1
(South Korea) Gim Eun-ji	6
(Alberta) Kayla Skrlik	5	(South Korea) Ha Seung-youn	1
(South Korea) Ha Seung-youn	8	(South Korea) Gim Eun-ji	6
(British Columbia) Corryn Brown	10	(British Columbia) Corryn Brown	2
(Alberta) Kellie Stiksma	4	(British Columbia) Corryn Brown	8
(Alberta) Jessie Hunkin	7	(Alberta) Jessie Hunkin	5
(Alberta) Krysta Hilker	1

First Knockout	Qualifier 2
(Alberta) Casey Scheidegger	6
(British Columbia) Clancy Grandy	5	(British Columbia) Clancy Grandy	4
(Alberta) Kristie Moore	2	(Alberta) Casey Scheidegger	7
(Switzerland) Team Keiser	8	(Japan) Ikue Kitazawa	3
(Alberta) Lisa Parent	2	(Switzerland) Team Keiser	5
(Japan) Ikue Kitazawa	8	(Japan) Ikue Kitazawa	8
(Alberta) Elysa Crough	6

==== B event ====
Second Knockout	Qualifier 3
(Alberta) Kristie Moore	6
(Alberta) Lisa Parent	3	(Alberta) Kristie Moore	2
(South Korea) Ha Seung-youn	6
(South Korea) Ha Seung-youn	4
(Alberta) Jessie Hunkin	5	(Japan) Ikue Kitazawa	7
(Alberta) Elysa Crough	4	(Alberta) Jessie Hunkin	0
(Japan) Ikue Kitazawa	6

Second Knockout	Qualifier 4
(British Columbia) Clancy Grandy	8
(Alberta) Kayla Skrlik	7	(British Columbia) Clancy Grandy	2
(British Columbia) Corryn Brown	5
(British Columbia) Corryn Brown	3
(Alberta) Kellie Stiksma	4	(Switzerland) Team Keiser	7
(Alberta) Krysta Hilker	6	(Alberta) Krysta Hilker	2
(Switzerland) Team Keiser	7

==== C event ====
Third Knockout				Qualifier 5
(Alberta) Lisa Parent	2
(British Columbia) Clancy Grandy	8	(British Columbia) Clancy Grandy	4
(Alberta) Jessie Hunkin	6	(Alberta) Jessie Hunkin	6
(Alberta) Kellie Stiksma	4			(Alberta) Jessie Hunkin	5
				(South Korea) Ha Seung-youn	8

Third Knockout				Qualifier 6
(Alberta) Elysa Crough	8
(Alberta) Krysta Hilker	5	(Alberta) Elysa Crough	2
(Alberta) Kristie Moore	3	(Alberta) Kayla Skrlik	7
(Alberta) Kayla Skrlik	4			(Alberta) Kayla Skrlik	4
				(British Columbia) Corryn Brown	3

=== Knockout results ===
All draw times are listed in Mountain Time (UTC−06:00).

==== Draw 1 ====
Thursday, September 15, 7:00 pm

Sheet 3	1	2	3	4	5	6	7	8	Final
(Japan) Ikue Kitazawa 🔨	3	0	2	0	0	2	0	1	8
(Alberta) Elysa Crough	0	2	0	2	1	0	1	0	6

Sheet 4	1	2	3	4	5	6	7	8	Final
(Alberta) Kayla Skrlik	0	0	3	0	1	0	1	X	5
(South Korea) Ha Seung-youn 🔨	4	1	0	2	0	1	0	X	8

Sheet 5	1	2	3	4	5	6	7	8	Final
(Switzerland) Team Keiser	1	0	0	2	3	2	X	X	8
(Alberta) Lisa Parent 🔨	0	0	2	0	0	0	X	X	2

Sheet 6	1	2	3	4	5	6	7	8	Final
(British Columbia) Corryn Brown 🔨	2	0	0	1	0	4	3	X	10
(Alberta) Kellie Stiksma	0	2	1	0	1	0	0	X	4

Sheet 7	1	2	3	4	5	6	7	8	Final
(Alberta) Jessie Hunkin 🔨	1	1	2	0	1	2	X	X	7
(Alberta) Krysta Hilker	0	0	0	1	0	0	X	X	1

Sheet 8	1	2	3	4	5	6	7	8	Final
(British Columbia) Clancy Grandy 🔨	0	1	0	1	1	1	0	1	5
(Alberta) Kristie Moore	0	0	0	0	0	0	2	0	2

==== Draw 2 ====
Friday, September 16, 10:00 am

Sheet 4	1	2	3	4	5	6	7	8	Final
(British Columbia) Corryn Brown	0	3	0	0	1	0	0	4	8
(Alberta) Jessie Hunkin 🔨	1	0	1	1	0	2	0	0	5

Sheet 5	1	2	3	4	5	6	7	8	Final
(Alberta) Casey Scheidegger 🔨	1	0	2	0	2	1	0	X	6
(British Columbia) Clancy Grandy	0	1	0	1	0	0	2	X	4

Sheet 6	1	2	3	4	5	6	7	8	Final
(South Korea) Gim Eun-ji 🔨	1	1	0	0	3	1	X	X	6
(South Korea) Ha Seung-youn	0	0	0	1	0	0	X	X	1

Sheet 7	1	2	3	4	5	6	7	8	Final
(Switzerland) Team Keiser 🔨	1	0	3	0	0	0	1	0	5
(Japan) Ikue Kitazawa	0	2	0	1	2	1	0	2	8

==== Draw 3 ====
Friday, September 16, 1:00 pm

Sheet 3	1	2	3	4	5	6	7	8	Final
(Alberta) Kristie Moore 🔨	0	2	0	2	0	2	0	X	6
(Alberta) Lisa Parent	0	0	0	0	2	0	1	X	3

Sheet 5	1	2	3	4	5	6	7	8	Final
(Alberta) Kellie Stiksma	0	1	0	0	1	0	2	X	4
(Alberta) Krysta Hilker 🔨	0	0	2	2	0	2	0	X	6

Sheet 6	1	2	3	4	5	6	7	8	Final
(Alberta) Jessie Hunkin	0	0	1	1	1	1	0	1	5
(Alberta) Elysa Crough 🔨	0	2	0	0	0	0	2	0	4

Sheet 7	1	2	3	4	5	6	7	8	Final
(British Columbia) Clancy Grandy 🔨	3	0	3	0	0	2	0	0	8
(Alberta) Kayla Skrlik	0	1	0	1	3	0	1	1	7

==== Draw 4 ====
Friday, September 16, 4:00 pm

Sheet 5	1	2	3	4	5	6	7	8	Final
(South Korea) Gim Eun-ji 🔨	0	3	0	3	0	X	X	X	6
(British Columbia) Corryn Brown	0	0	1	0	1	X	X	X	2

Sheet 6	1	2	3	4	5	6	7	8	Final
(Alberta) Casey Scheidegger	0	0	2	0	2	0	1	2	7
(Japan) Ikue Kitazawa 🔨	0	1	0	1	0	1	0	0	3

==== Draw 5 ====
Friday, September 16, 7:00 pm

Sheet 3	1	2	3	4	5	6	7	8	Final
(British Columbia) Clancy Grandy 🔨	0	1	0	1	0	0	0	X	2
(British Columbia) Corryn Brown	0	0	0	0	3	1	1	X	5

Sheet 4	1	2	3	4	5	6	7	8	Final
(Alberta) Krysta Hilker	0	2	0	0	0	0	X	X	2
(Switzerland) Team Keiser 🔨	3	0	1	1	1	1	X	X	7

Sheet 5	1	2	3	4	5	6	7	8	Final
(Alberta) Jessie Hunkin	0	0	0	0	0	X	X	X	0
(Japan) Ikue Kitazawa 🔨	0	2	1	1	2	X	X	X	6

Sheet 7	1	2	3	4	5	6	7	8	Final
(Alberta) Kristie Moore	0	0	0	2	0	0	0	X	2
(South Korea) Ha Seung-youn 🔨	0	1	0	0	0	4	1	X	6

==== Draw 6 ====
Saturday, September 17, 10:00 am

Sheet 3	1	2	3	4	5	6	7	8	Final
(Alberta) Jessie Hunkin	0	0	1	0	1	1	2	1	6
(Alberta) Kellie Stiksma 🔨	0	3	0	1	0	0	0	0	4

Sheet 4	1	2	3	4	5	6	7	8	Final
(Alberta) Lisa Parent 🔨	0	0	1	0	1	0	X	X	2
(British Columbia) Clancy Grandy	0	1	0	3	0	4	X	X	8

Sheet 5	1	2	3	4	5	6	7	8	Final
(Alberta) Kristie Moore 🔨	1	0	1	0	0	1	0	0	3
(Alberta) Kayla Skrlik	0	1	0	1	0	0	0	2	4

Sheet 7	1	2	3	4	5	6	7	8	Final
(Alberta) Elysa Crough	0	2	0	2	0	3	1	X	8
(Alberta) Krysta Hilker 🔨	3	0	1	0	1	0	0	X	5

==== Draw 7 ====
Saturday, September 17, 1:00 pm

Sheet 3	1	2	3	4	5	6	7	8	Final
(South Korea) Ha Seung-youn 🔨	0	1	0	1	0	2	0	0	4
(Japan) Ikue Kitazawa	0	0	2	0	0	0	4	1	7

Sheet 4	1	2	3	4	5	6	7	8	Final
(Alberta) Elysa Crough	0	1	0	0	1	X	X	X	2
(Alberta) Kayla Skrlik 🔨	0	0	4	3	0	X	X	X	7

Sheet 5	1	2	3	4	5	6	7	8	Final
(British Columbia) Corryn Brown 🔨	3	0	0	0	0	0	0	X	3
(Switzerland) Team Keiser	0	1	0	1	0	0	5	X	7

Sheet 6	1	2	3	4	5	6	7	8	Final
(British Columbia) Clancy Grandy	1	0	1	0	1	0	1	0	4
(Alberta) Jessie Hunkin 🔨	0	1	0	3	0	1	0	1	6

==== Draw 8 ====
Saturday, September 17, 7:00 pm

Sheet 5	1	2	3	4	5	6	7	8	Final
(Alberta) Jessie Hunkin	0	0	0	3	1	1	0	0	5
(South Korea) Ha Seung-youn 🔨	2	1	2	0	0	0	1	2	8

Sheet 6	1	2	3	4	5	6	7	8	Final
(Alberta) Kayla Skrlik	0	1	0	0	0	1	0	2	4
(British Columbia) Corryn Brown 🔨	1	0	0	0	0	0	2	0	3

=== Playoffs ===
Quarterfinals
3	(Japan) Ikue Kitazawa	8
6	(Alberta) Kayla Skrlik	1
5	(South Korea) Ha Seung-youn	3
4	(Switzerland) Team Keiser	7

Semifinals
1	(South Korea) Gim Eun-ji	3
3	(Japan) Ikue Kitazawa	9
2	(Alberta) Casey Scheidegger	2
4	(Switzerland) Team Keiser	4

Final
3	(Japan) Ikue Kitazawa	8
4	(Switzerland) Team Keiser	3

==== Quarterfinals ====
Sunday, September 18, 9:00 am

Sheet 3	1	2	3	4	5	6	7	8	Final
(South Korea) Ha Seung-youn	0	0	2	1	0	0	0	0	3
(Switzerland) Team Keiser 🔨	1	2	0	0	0	2	1	1	7

Sheet 7	1	2	3	4	5	6	7	8	Final
(Japan) Ikue Kitazawa 🔨	3	1	0	4	X	X	X	X	8
(Alberta) Kayla Skrlik	0	0	1	0	X	X	X	X	1

==== Semifinals ====
Sunday, September 18, 12:00 pm

Sheet 4	1	2	3	4	5	6	7	8	Final
(Alberta) Casey Scheidegger 🔨	1	0	0	0	1	0	0	X	2
(Switzerland) Team Keiser	0	0	1	1	0	1	1	X	4

Sheet 5	1	2	3	4	5	6	7	8	Final
(South Korea) Gim Eun-ji 🔨	0	1	0	1	0	1	0	X	3
(Japan) Ikue Kitazawa	0	0	3	0	2	0	4	X	9

==== Final ====
Sunday, September 18, 3:00 pm

Sheet 6	1	2	3	4	5	6	7	8	Final
(Japan) Ikue Kitazawa 🔨	0	2	1	0	1	0	0	4	8
(Switzerland) Team Keiser	0	0	0	1	0	2	0	0	3
