= Madtown Doubledown =

World Curling Tour event

- Established: 2018
- Host city: McFarland, Wisconsin
- Arena: Madison Curling Club
- Purse: $25,000 (USD)
- 2026 champion: (Norway) Kjærland / Brænden

The Madtown Doubledown is an annual mixed doubles curling tournament that was on the ISS Mixed Doubles World Curling Tour from 2018 until 2023. It is held annually at the Madison Curling Club in McFarland, Wisconsin.

The purse for the event is $25,000, and its event categorization is 750 (highest calibre is 1000). It has one of the largest payouts on the mixed doubles tour.

The event has been held since 2018.

== Past champions ==
| Year | Winning pair | Runner up pair | Semifinalists | Purse ($US) |
|---|---|---|---|---|
| 2018 | (United States) Monica Walker / Alex Leichter | (Canada) Shannon Birchard / Catlin Schneider | (Canada) Chelsea Carey / John Morris & (United States) Jamie Sinclair / Sean Beighton | $20,000 |
| 2019 | (Sweden) Anna Hasselborg / Oskar Eriksson | (Norway) Kristin Moen Skaslien / Magnus Nedregotten | (Canada) Clancy Grandy / Patrick Janssen & (Canada) Jolene Campbell / John Morris | $24,000 |
| 2020 | Cancelled | | | |
| 2023 | (Japan) Chiaki Matsumura / Yasumasa Tanida | (Canada) Laura Walker / Kirk Muyres | (Canada) Nancy Martin / Steve Laycock & (United States) Aileen Geving / John Shuster | $20,500 |
| 2024 (Jan.) | (United States) Sarah Anderson / Andrew Stopera | (United States) Rebecca Hamilton / Matt Hamilton | (Canada) Laura Walker / Kirk Muyres & (Canada) Meghan Walter / Catlin Schneider | $26,000 |
| 2024 (Nov.) | (Estonia) Marie Kaldvee / Harri Lill | (Australia) Tahli Gill / Dean Hewitt | (Canada) Nancy Martin / Steve Laycock & (United States) Cory Thiesse / Korey Dropkin | $26,000 |
| 2025 | (Canada) Katie Ford / Oliver Campbell | (Sweden) Therese Westman / Robin Ahlberg | (Japan) Tori Koana / Go Aoki & (United States) Sara Olson / Korey Dropkin | $26,000 |
| 2026 | (Norway) Eilin Kjærland / Mathias Brænden | (Norway) Kristin Skaslien / Magnus Nedregotten | (Canada) Melissa Adams / Alex Robichaud & (South Korea) Kang Bo-bae / Kim Hak-jun | $25,000 |
