= 2016 Canad Inns Women's Classic =

World Curling Tour event

- Host city: Portage la Prairie, Manitoba
- Arena: Portage Curling Club
- Dates: October 21–24
- Winner: (Ontario) Team Homan
- Curling club: Ottawa CC, Ottawa
- Skip: Rachel Homan
- Third: Emma Miskew
- Second: Joanne Courtney
- Lead: Lisa Weagle
- Finalist: (Japan) Chiaki Matsumura

The 2016 Canad Inns Women's Classic was held from October 21 to 24 at the Portage Curling Club in Portage la Prairie, Manitoba as part of the World Curling Tour. The event was held in a triple-knockout format with a purse of $60,000.

In the final, Team Rachel Homan of Ottawa, Ontario topped Team Chiaki Matsumura of Japan 9–4 in six ends. Homan lost their first game of the event to China's Mei Jie before winning their next eight games to claim the championship.

== Teams ==
The teams are listed as follows:

Skip	Third	Second	Lead	Locale
Sherry Anderson	Jessica Lang	Krista Fesser	Brie Spilchen	Delisle, Saskatchewan
Brett Barber	Sherry Just	Robyn Despins	Rachel Fritzer	Biggar, Saskatchewan
Melanie Barbezat	Jenny Perret	Carole Howald	Daniela Rupp	Biel, Switzerland
Shannon Birchard	Nicole Sigvaldson	Sheyna Andries	Mariah Mondor	Winnipeg, Manitoba
Rachel Burtnyk	Jennifer Clark-Rouire	Sydney Arnal	Kylee Calvert	Winnipeg, Manitoba
Jolene Campbell	Ashley Howard	Callan Hamon	Ashley Williamson	Regina, Saskatchewan
Cory Christensen	Sarah Anderson	Taylor Anderson	Jenna Haag	(United States) Blaine, Minnesota
Chantelle Eberle	Kristie Moore	Larisa Murray	Debbie Lozinski	Regina, Saskatchewan
Kerri Einarson	Selena Kaatz	Liz Fyfe	Kristin MacCuish	Winnipeg, Manitoba
Michelle Englot	Kate Cameron	Leslie Wilson-Westcott	Raunora Westcott	Winnipeg, Manitoba
Tracy Fleury	Jennifer Wylie	Jenna Walsh	Amanda Gates	Sudbury, Ontario
Jacqueline Harrison	Janet Murphy	Stephanie Matheson	Melissa Foster	Mississauga, Ontario
Anna Hasselborg	Sara McManus	Agnes Knochenhauer	Sofia Mabergs	Sundbyberg, Sweden
Rachel Homan	Emma Miskew	Joanne Courtney	Lisa Weagle	Ottawa, Ontario
Jennifer Jones	Kaitlyn Lawes	Jill Officer	Dawn McEwen	Winnipeg, Manitoba
Mallory Kean	Carly Howard	Kerilynn Mathers	Megan Arnold	Kitchener, Ontario
Kim Eun-jung	Kim Kyeong-ae	Kim Seon-yeong	Kim Yeong-mi	Uiseong, South Korea
Junko Nishimuro (Fourth)	Tori Koana (Skip)	Yuna Kotani	Mao Ishigaki	Yamanashi, Japan
Stefanie Lawton	Beth Iskiw	Sherri Singler	Jessica Iles	Saskatoon, Saskatchewan
Chiaki Matsumura	Emi Shimizu	Ikue Kitazawa	Hasumi Ishigooka	Karuizawa, Japan
Krista McCarville	Kendra Lilly	Ashley Sippala	Sarah Potts	Thunder Bay, Ontario
Mei Jie	Dong Ziqi	Fan Suyuan	Gao Xuesong	Harbin, China
Sherry Middaugh	Jo-Ann Rizzo	Lee Merklinger	Kim Tuck	Coldwater, Ontario
Cathy Overton-Clapham	Jenna Loder	Katherine Doerksen	Sarah Pyke	Winnipeg, Manitoba
Darcy Robertson	Karen Klein	Vanessa Foster	Michelle Madden	Winnipeg, Manitoba
Nina Roth	Tabitha Peterson	Aileen Geving	Becca Hamilton	(United States) Blaine, Minnesota
Cissi Östlund (Fourth)	Christina Bertrup	Maria Wennerström	Margaretha Sigfridsson (Skip)	Skellefteå, Sweden
Jamie Sinclair	Alex Carlson	Vicky Persinger	Monica Walker	(United States) Blaine, Minnesota
Hazel Smith	Sarah Reid	Laura Ritchie	Claire Hamilton	Stirling, Scotland
Barb Spencer	Katie Spencer	Holly Spencer	Allyson Spencer	Winnipeg, Manitoba
Silvana Tirinzoni	Manuela Siegrist	Esther Neuenschwander	Marlene Albrecht	Zürich, Switzerland
Wang Bingyu	Zhou Yan	Liu Jinli	Yang Ying	Harbin, China

== Knockout brackets ==
=== A event ===
First Knockout
(Manitoba) Jennifer Jones	8
(Switzerland) Melanie Barbezat	4
(Saskatchewan) Chantelle Eberle	4
(Saskatchewan) Jolene Campbell	3
(Sweden) Anna Hasselborg	9
(Scotland) Hazel Smith	1
(Ontario) Sherry Middaugh	3
(Saskatchewan) Sherry Anderson	4
(Switzerland) Silvana Tirinzoni	7
(Japan) Tori Koana	5
(United States) Nina Roth	5
(Manitoba) Barb Spencer	7
(South Korea) Kim Eun-jung	6
(Manitoba) Cathy Overton-Clapham	8
(Sweden) Margaretha Sigfridsson	5
(Manitoba) Shannon Birchard	4

Quarterfinals
(Manitoba) Jennifer Jones	5
(Saskatchewan) Chantelle Eberle	0
(Sweden) Anna Hasselborg	6
(Saskatchewan) Sherry Anderson	4
(Switzerland) Silvana Tirinzoni	7
(Manitoba) Barb Spencer	3
(Manitoba) Cathy Overton-Clapham	3
(Sweden) Margaretha Sigfridsson	9

Semifinals
(Manitoba) Jennifer Jones	3
(Sweden) Anna Hasselborg	6
(Switzerland) Silvana Tirinzoni	4
(Sweden) Margaretha Sigfridsson	8

Qualifier 1
(Sweden) Anna Hasselborg	7
(Sweden) Margaretha Sigfridsson	4

First Knockout
(Ontario) Rachel Homan	5
(China) Mei Jie	6
(Manitoba) Darcy Robertson	7
(United States) Cory Christensen	6
(Manitoba) Michelle Englot	8
(Ontario) Mallory Kean	2
(Ontario) Krista McCarville	4
(Manitoba) Rachel Burtnyk	6
(Manitoba) Kerri Einarson	7
(Japan) Chiaki Matsumura	5
(Saskatchewan) Stefanie Lawton	5
(China) Wang Bingyu	4
(Ontario) Tracy Fleury	5
(Saskatchewan) Brett Barber	4
(Ontario) Jacqueline Harrison	8
(United States) Jamie Sinclair	3

Quarterfinals
(China) Mei Jie	2
(Manitoba) Darcy Robertson	5
(Manitoba) Michelle Englot	5
(Manitoba) Rachel Burtnyk	6
(Manitoba) Kerri Einarson	9
(Saskatchewan) Stefanie Lawton	7
(Ontario) Tracy Fleury	5
(Ontario) Jacqueline Harrison	4

Semifinals
(Manitoba) Darcy Robertson	2
(Manitoba) Rachel Burtnyk	10
(Manitoba) Kerri Einarson	4
(Ontario) Tracy Fleury	5

Qualifier 2
(Manitoba) Rachel Burtnyk	2
(Ontario) Tracy Fleury	5

=== B event ===
Second Knockout
(Switzerland) Melanie Barbezat	5
(Saskatchewan) Jolene Campbell	9
(Ontario) Sherry Middaugh	7
(Scotland) Hazel Smith	3

Quarterfinals
(Manitoba) Cathy Overton-Clapham	2
(Saskatchewan) Jolene Campbell	6
(Manitoba) Barb Spencer	3
(Ontario) Sherry Middaugh	6

Semifinals
(Saskatchewan) Jolene Campbell	4
(Manitoba) Darcy Robertson	8
(Ontario) Sherry Middaugh	8
(Manitoba) Kerri Einarson	4

To Qualifier 3
(Manitoba) Darcy Robertson	5
(Ontario) Sherry Middaugh	6
Qualifier 3
(Ontario) Sherry Middaugh	5
(Saskatchewan) Sherry Anderson	9

Second Knockout
(Japan) Tori Koana	5
(United States) Nina Roth	4
(South Korea) Kim Eun-jung	3
(Manitoba) Shannon Birchard	5

Quarterfinals
(Saskatchewan) Sherry Anderson	7
(Japan) Tori Koana	3
(Saskatchewan) Chantelle Eberle	6
(Manitoba) Shannon Birchard	3

Semifinals
(Saskatchewan) Sherry Anderson	10
(Saskatchewan) Chantelle Eberle	4

To Qualifier 3
(Saskatchewan) Sherry Anderson	8
(Manitoba) Rachel Burtnyk	7

Second Knockout
(Ontario) Rachel Homan	5
(United States) Cory Christensen	3
(Ontario) Mallory Kean	4
(Ontario) Krista McCarville	5

Quarterfinals
(Ontario) Jacqueline Harrison	7
(Ontario) Rachel Homan	9
(Saskatchewan) Stefanie Lawton	5
(Ontario) Krista McCarville	6

Semifinals
(Ontario) Rachel Homan	8
(Manitoba) Jennifer Jones	0
(Ontario) Krista McCarville	3
(Switzerland) Silvana Tirinzoni	8

To Qualifier 4
(Ontario) Rachel Homan	5
(Switzerland) Silvana Tirinzoni	4
Qualifier 4
(Ontario) Rachel Homan	7
(Sweden) Margaretha Sigfridsson	3

Second Knockout
(Japan) Chiaki Matsumura	6
(China) Wang Bingyu	2
(Saskatchewan) Brett Barber	6
(United States) Jamie Sinclair	7

Quarterfinals
(Manitoba) Michelle Englot	8
(Japan) Chiaki Matsumura	2
(China) Mei Jie	5
(United States) Jamie Sinclair	6

Semifinals
(Manitoba) Michelle Englot	4
(United States) Jamie Sinclair	3

To Qualifier 4
(Manitoba) Michelle Englot	1
(Sweden) Margaretha Sigfridsson	6

=== C event ===
Third Knockout
(Switzerland) Melanie Barbezat	5
(Scotland) Hazel Smith	2
(South Korea) Kim Eun-jung	8
(United States) Nina Roth	3

Quarterfinals
(Manitoba) Jennifer Jones	6
(Switzerland) Melanie Barbezat	5
(Ontario) Krista McCarville	7
(South Korea) Kim Eun-jung	6

Semifinals
(Manitoba) Jennifer Jones	8
(Ontario) Krista McCarville	4

Qualifier 5
(Manitoba) Jennifer Jones	7
(Ontario) Sherry Middaugh	4

Third Knockout
(Manitoba) Cathy Overton-Clapham	7
(Manitoba) Barb Spencer	6

Quarterfinals
(Japan) Tori Koana	5
(Manitoba) Shannon Birchard	7
(United States) Jamie Sinclair	9
(Manitoba) Cathy Overton-Clapham	5

Semifinals
(Manitoba) Shannon Birchard	7
(Manitoba) Darcy Robertson	5
(United States) Jamie Sinclair	8
(Switzerland) Silvana Tirinzoni	5

Qualifier 6
(Manitoba) Shannon Birchard	5
(United States) Jamie Sinclair	2

Third Knockout
(Ontario) Jacqueline Harrison	4
(Saskatchewan) Stefanie Lawton	6

Quarterfinals
(Saskatchewan) Jolene Campbell	5
(Saskatchewan) Stefanie Lawton	4
(Japan) Chiaki Matsumura	5
(China) Mei Jie	3

Semifinals
(Saskatchewan) Jolene Campbell	2
(Manitoba) Michelle Englot	8
(Japan) Chiaki Matsumura	6
(Manitoba) Rachel Burtnyk	0

Qualifier 7
(Manitoba) Michelle Englot	3
(Japan) Chiaki Matsumura	8

Third Knockout
(United States) Cory Christensen	2
(Ontario) Mallory Kean	7
(China) Wang Bingyu	7
(Saskatchewan) Brett Barber	2

Quarterfinals
(Manitoba) Kerri Einarson	7
(Ontario) Mallory Kean	5
(Saskatchewan) Chantelle Eberle	5
(China) Wang Bingyu	6

Semifinals
(Manitoba) Kerri Einarson	2
(China) Wang Bingyu	6

Qualifier 8
(China) Wang Bingyu	7
(Sweden) Margaretha Sigfridsson	6

== Knockout results ==
All draw times listed in Central Time (UTC−06:00).

=== Draw 1 ===
Friday, October 21, 10:00 am

Team	1	2	3	4	5	6	7	8	Final
(Manitoba) Jennifer Jones 🔨	2	0	0	4	1	0	1	X	8
(Switzerland) Melanie Barbezat	0	3	0	0	0	1	0	X	4

Team	1	2	3	4	5	6	7	8	Final
(Saskatchewan) Chantelle Eberle 🔨	1	0	0	0	0	1	2	0	4
(Saskatchewan) Jolene Campbell	0	1	1	0	0	0	0	1	3

Team	1	2	3	4	5	6	7	8	Final
(Sweden) Anna Hasselborg 🔨	0	1	2	0	3	3	X	X	9
(Scotland) Hazel Smith	0	0	0	1	0	0	X	X	1

Team	1	2	3	4	5	6	7	8	Final
(Ontario) Sherry Middaugh 🔨	2	0	0	0	0	1	0	0	3
(Saskatchewan) Sherry Anderson	0	1	0	1	0	0	1	1	4

Team	1	2	3	4	5	6	7	8	Final
(Switzerland) Silvana Tirinzoni 🔨	2	0	2	0	1	0	2	X	7
(Japan) Tori Koana	0	3	0	1	0	1	0	X	5

Team	1	2	3	4	5	6	7	8	Final
(United States) Nina Roth 🔨	2	0	0	1	0	1	1	0	5
(Manitoba) Barb Spencer	0	3	0	0	2	0	0	2	7

Team	1	2	3	4	5	6	7	8	Final
(South Korea) Kim Eun-jung 🔨	1	0	0	2	0	3	0	0	6
(Manitoba) Cathy Overton-Clapham	0	2	2	0	1	0	1	2	8

Team	1	2	3	4	5	6	7	8	Final
(Sweden) Margaretha Sigfridsson	0	0	1	1	0	2	0	1	5
(Manitoba) Shannon Birchard 🔨	0	0	0	0	2	0	2	0	4

=== Draw 2 ===
Friday, October 21, 1:30 pm

Team	1	2	3	4	5	6	7	8	Final
(Ontario) Rachel Homan	0	0	1	0	3	1	0	0	5
(China) Mei Jie 🔨	0	1	0	3	0	0	1	1	6

Team	1	2	3	4	5	6	7	8	9	Final
(Manitoba) Darcy Robertson 🔨	0	2	2	0	1	0	1	0	1	7
(United States) Cory Christensen	0	0	0	1	0	2	0	3	0	6

Team	1	2	3	4	5	6	7	8	Final
(Manitoba) Michelle Englot 🔨	2	0	5	1	X	X	X	X	8
(Ontario) Mallory Kean	0	2	0	0	X	X	X	X	2

Team	1	2	3	4	5	6	7	8	Final
(Ontario) Krista McCarville	0	0	1	1	0	2	0	X	4
(Manitoba) Rachel Burtnyk 🔨	2	2	0	0	1	0	1	X	6

Team	1	2	3	4	5	6	7	8	Final
(Manitoba) Kerri Einarson 🔨	0	3	2	0	1	1	0	X	7
(Japan) Chiaki Matsumura	2	0	0	1	0	0	2	X	5

Team	1	2	3	4	5	6	7	8	Final
(Saskatchewan) Stefanie Lawton	0	0	2	0	1	0	1	1	5
(China) Wang Bingyu 🔨	0	2	0	1	0	1	0	0	4

Team	1	2	3	4	5	6	7	8	9	Final
(Ontario) Tracy Fleury 🔨	0	1	0	0	1	1	0	1	1	5
(Saskatchewan) Brett Barber	1	0	0	1	0	0	2	0	0	4

Team	1	2	3	4	5	6	7	8	Final
(Ontario) Jacqueline Harrison	0	0	0	3	1	1	0	3	8
(United States) Jamie Sinclair 🔨	1	1	0	0	0	0	1	0	3

=== Draw 3 ===
Friday, October 21, 5:00 pm

Team	1	2	3	4	5	6	7	8	Final
(Manitoba) Jennifer Jones 🔨	1	0	1	1	1	1	X	X	5
(Saskatchewan) Chantelle Eberle	0	0	0	0	0	0	X	X	0

Team	1	2	3	4	5	6	7	8	Final
(Sweden) Anna Hasselborg 🔨	1	0	0	2	0	2	0	1	6
(Saskatchewan) Sherry Anderson	0	0	1	0	0	0	3	0	4

Team	1	2	3	4	5	6	7	8	Final
(Switzerland) Silvana Tirinzoni 🔨	1	0	0	3	2	0	1	X	7
(Manitoba) Barb Spencer	0	0	2	0	0	1	0	X	3

Team	1	2	3	4	5	6	7	8	Final
(Manitoba) Cathy Overton-Clapham 🔨	0	1	0	0	1	1	0	X	3
(Sweden) Margaretha Sigfridsson	1	0	4	1	0	0	3	X	9

Team	1	2	3	4	5	6	7	8	Final
(Switzerland) Melanie Barbezat 🔨	0	3	1	0	1	0	0	X	5
(Saskatchewan) Jolene Campbell	3	0	0	1	0	3	2	X	9

Team	1	2	3	4	5	6	7	8	Final
(Ontario) Sherry Middaugh	1	0	2	2	0	2	X	X	7
(Scotland) Hazel Smith 🔨	0	1	0	0	2	0	X	X	3

Team	1	2	3	4	5	6	7	8	Final
(Japan) Tori Koana 🔨	1	1	0	1	0	2	0	X	5
(United States) Nina Roth	0	0	2	0	1	0	1	X	4

Team	1	2	3	4	5	6	7	8	Final
(South Korea) Kim Eun-jung 🔨	1	1	0	0	0	1	0	X	3
(Manitoba) Shannon Birchard	0	0	2	0	1	0	2	X	5

=== Draw 4 ===
Friday, October 21, 8:30 pm

Team	1	2	3	4	5	6	7	8	Final
(China) Mei Jie 🔨	0	2	0	0	0	0	0	0	2
(Manitoba) Darcy Robertson	0	0	2	0	1	0	0	2	5

Team	1	2	3	4	5	6	7	8	Final
(Manitoba) Michelle Englot	0	0	1	0	2	0	2	0	5
(Manitoba) Rachel Burtnyk 🔨	0	1	0	2	0	2	0	1	6

Team	1	2	3	4	5	6	7	8	9	Final
(Manitoba) Kerri Einarson 🔨	1	0	2	0	2	0	2	0	2	9
(Saskatchewan) Stefanie Lawton	0	3	0	1	0	2	0	1	0	7

Team	1	2	3	4	5	6	7	8	Final
(Ontario) Tracy Fleury 🔨	2	0	2	0	0	0	0	1	5
(Ontario) Jacqueline Harrison	0	1	0	1	1	0	1	0	4

Team	1	2	3	4	5	6	7	8	Final
(Ontario) Rachel Homan 🔨	1	0	1	0	1	0	2	X	5
(United States) Cory Christensen	0	1	0	1	0	1	0	X	3

Team	1	2	3	4	5	6	7	8	Final
(Ontario) Mallory Kean 🔨	0	0	0	1	0	2	0	1	4
(Ontario) Krista McCarville	0	1	1	0	2	0	1	0	5

Team	1	2	3	4	5	6	7	8	Final
(Japan) Chiaki Matsumura 🔨	2	0	2	2	0	0	0	X	6
(China) Wang Bingyu	0	1	0	0	0	1	0	X	2

Team	1	2	3	4	5	6	7	8	9	Final
(Saskatchewan) Brett Barber 🔨	0	1	0	0	1	0	2	2	0	6
(United States) Jamie Sinclair	1	0	2	2	0	1	0	0	1	7

=== Draw 5 ===
Saturday, October 22, 10:00 am

Team	1	2	3	4	5	6	7	8	Final
(Manitoba) Cathy Overton-Clapham	0	0	1	0	0	1	0	X	2
(Saskatchewan) Jolene Campbell 🔨	0	1	0	2	1	0	2	X	6

Team	1	2	3	4	5	6	7	8	Final
(Manitoba) Barb Spencer	0	0	2	0	1	0	0	0	3
(Ontario) Sherry Middaugh 🔨	1	0	0	1	0	1	2	1	6

Team	1	2	3	4	5	6	7	8	Final
(Saskatchewan) Sherry Anderson	1	0	0	1	0	2	3	X	7
(Japan) Tori Koana 🔨	0	3	0	0	0	0	0	X	3

Team	1	2	3	4	5	6	7	8	Final
(Saskatchewan) Chantelle Eberle 🔨	3	0	1	0	0	1	1	X	6
(Manitoba) Shannon Birchard	0	1	0	1	1	0	0	X	3

Team	1	2	3	4	5	6	7	8	Final
(Ontario) Jacqueline Harrison	0	2	0	3	0	2	0	0	7
(Ontario) Rachel Homan 🔨	2	0	2	0	1	0	2	2	9

Team	1	2	3	4	5	6	7	8	9	Final
(Saskatchewan) Stefanie Lawton	0	1	0	0	1	0	2	1	0	5
(Ontario) Krista McCarville 🔨	0	0	2	2	0	1	0	0	1	6

Team	1	2	3	4	5	6	7	8	Final
(Manitoba) Michelle Englot 🔨	3	3	0	0	1	1	X	X	8
(Japan) Chiaki Matsumura	0	0	1	1	0	0	X	X	2

Team	1	2	3	4	5	6	7	8	9	Final
(China) Mei Jie 🔨	0	1	0	2	1	0	1	0	0	5
(United States) Jamie Sinclair	2	0	1	0	0	1	0	1	1	6

=== Draw 6 ===
Saturday, October 22, 1:30 pm

Team	1	2	3	4	5	6	7	8	Final
(Manitoba) Jennifer Jones	0	1	0	0	1	0	1	X	3
(Sweden) Anna Hasselborg 🔨	1	0	1	1	0	3	0	X	6

Team	1	2	3	4	5	6	7	8	Final
(Switzerland) Silvana Tirinzoni	0	0	2	0	1	1	0	0	4
(Sweden) Margaretha Sigfridsson 🔨	2	1	0	1	0	0	3	1	8

Team	1	2	3	4	5	6	7	8	Final
(Manitoba) Darcy Robertson 🔨	0	1	0	1	0	X	X	X	2
(Manitoba) Rachel Burtnyk	2	0	3	0	5	X	X	X	10

Team	1	2	3	4	5	6	7	8	Final
(Manitoba) Kerri Einarson	0	0	1	0	1	0	1	1	4
(Ontario) Tracy Fleury 🔨	0	2	0	2	0	1	0	0	5

Team	1	2	3	4	5	6	7	8	Final
(Switzerland) Melanie Barbezat 🔨	2	0	0	0	1	0	2	X	5
(Scotland) Hazel Smith	0	0	0	1	0	1	0	X	2

Team	1	2	3	4	5	6	7	8	Final
(South Korea) Kim Eun-jung 🔨	2	4	0	1	0	1	X	X	8
(United States) Nina Roth	0	0	2	0	1	0	X	X	3

Team	1	2	3	4	5	6	7	8	Final
(United States) Cory Christensen	0	2	0	0	0	0	X	X	2
(Ontario) Mallory Kean 🔨	2	0	0	3	1	1	X	X	7

Team	1	2	3	4	5	6	7	8	Final
(China) Wang Bingyu	0	2	0	3	0	2	X	X	7
(Saskatchewan) Brett Barber 🔨	1	0	0	0	1	0	X	X	2

=== Draw 7 ===
Saturday, October 22, 5:00 pm

Team	1	2	3	4	5	6	7	8	Final
(Saskatchewan) Sherry Anderson 🔨	2	0	4	0	4	X	X	X	10
(Saskatchewan) Chantelle Eberle	0	2	0	2	0	X	X	X	4

Team	1	2	3	4	5	6	7	8	Final
(Manitoba) Michelle Englot 🔨	0	0	2	0	1	0	0	1	4
(United States) Jamie Sinclair	0	0	0	1	0	2	0	0	3

Team	1	2	3	4	5	6	7	8	Final
(Manitoba) Cathy Overton-Clapham 🔨	0	2	0	0	0	2	2	1	7
(Manitoba) Barb Spencer	0	0	4	0	2	0	0	0	6

Team	1	2	3	4	5	6	7	8	Final
(Ontario) Jacqueline Harrison 🔨	2	0	0	0	0	1	1	0	4
(Saskatchewan) Stefanie Lawton	0	1	1	2	1	0	0	1	6

Team	1	2	3	4	5	6	7	8	Final
(Japan) Tori Koana	0	0	1	0	2	1	1	0	5
(Manitoba) Shannon Birchard 🔨	2	1	0	2	0	0	0	2	7

Team	1	2	3	4	5	6	7	8	Final
(Japan) Chiaki Matsumura	0	1	1	0	0	0	0	3	5
(China) Mei Jie 🔨	1	0	0	0	1	1	0	0	3

=== Draw 8 ===
Saturday, October 22, 8:30 pm

Team	1	2	3	4	5	6	7	8	Final
(Sweden) Anna Hasselborg	2	0	0	1	0	0	2	2	7
(Sweden) Margaretha Sigfridsson 🔨	0	2	1	0	0	1	0	0	4

Team	1	2	3	4	5	6	7	8	Final
(Manitoba) Rachel Burtnyk	0	0	1	0	1	0	0	X	2
(Ontario) Tracy Fleury 🔨	2	0	0	2	0	1	0	X	5

Team	1	2	3	4	5	6	7	8	Final
(Saskatchewan) Jolene Campbell	0	2	0	1	0	1	0	0	4
(Manitoba) Darcy Robertson 🔨	1	0	1	0	3	0	1	2	8

Team	1	2	3	4	5	6	7	8	Final
(Ontario) Sherry Middaugh 🔨	1	0	2	0	1	1	0	3	8
(Manitoba) Kerri Einarson	0	1	0	1	0	0	2	0	4

Team	1	2	3	4	5	6	7	8	Final
(Ontario) Rachel Homan 🔨	1	1	3	3	X	X	X	X	8
(Manitoba) Jennifer Jones	0	0	0	0	X	X	X	X	0

Team	1	2	3	4	5	6	7	8	Final
(Ontario) Krista McCarville	0	0	0	2	0	1	0	X	3
(Switzerland) Silvana Tirinzoni 🔨	2	0	1	0	1	0	4	X	8

Team	1	2	3	4	5	6	7	8	Final
(United States) Jamie Sinclair	0	4	0	2	0	0	3	X	9
(Manitoba) Cathy Overton-Clapham 🔨	0	0	1	0	2	2	0	X	5

Team	1	2	3	4	5	6	7	8	Final
(Saskatchewan) Chantelle Eberle 🔨	2	0	2	0	0	0	1	X	5
(China) Wang Bingyu	0	1	0	1	2	2	0	X	6

=== Draw 9 ===
Sunday, October 23, 10:00 am

Team	1	2	3	4	5	6	7	8	9	Final
(Manitoba) Darcy Robertson 🔨	1	0	2	0	0	0	2	0	0	5
(Ontario) Sherry Middaugh	0	1	0	1	1	1	0	1	1	6

Team	1	2	3	4	5	6	7	8	Final
(Saskatchewan) Sherry Anderson	0	0	2	0	0	4	0	2	8
(Manitoba) Rachel Burtnyk 🔨	1	1	0	2	1	0	2	0	7

Team	1	2	3	4	5	6	7	8	Final
(Ontario) Rachel Homan	0	2	1	0	0	1	0	1	5
(Switzerland) Silvana Tirinzoni 🔨	1	0	0	2	0	0	1	0	4

Team	1	2	3	4	5	6	7	8	Final
(Manitoba) Michelle Englot 🔨	0	0	1	0	X	X	X	X	1
(Sweden) Margaretha Sigfridsson	2	1	0	3	X	X	X	X	6

Team	1	2	3	4	5	6	7	8	9	Final
(Manitoba) Jennifer Jones	0	0	2	0	1	0	0	2	1	6
(Switzerland) Melanie Barbezat 🔨	2	0	0	2	0	0	1	0	0	5

Team	1	2	3	4	5	6	7	8	Final
(Ontario) Krista McCarville 🔨	2	0	2	0	2	0	0	1	7
(South Korea) Kim Eun-jung	0	2	0	2	0	2	0	0	6

Team	1	2	3	4	5	6	7	8	Final
(Saskatchewan) Jolene Campbell 🔨	2	0	1	0	2	0	0	0	5
(Saskatchewan) Stefanie Lawton	0	0	0	2	0	1	0	1	4

Team	1	2	3	4	5	6	7	8	Final
(Manitoba) Kerri Einarson 🔨	0	2	1	0	0	3	0	1	7
(Ontario) Mallory Kean	1	0	0	2	0	0	2	0	5

=== Draw 10 ===
Sunday, October 23, 1:30 pm

Team	1	2	3	4	5	6	7	8	Final
(Manitoba) Shannon Birchard	0	3	1	1	0	1	0	1	7
(Manitoba) Darcy Robertson 🔨	3	0	0	0	2	0	0	0	5

Team	1	2	3	4	5	6	7	8	Final
(United States) Jamie Sinclair 🔨	0	2	1	0	2	0	0	3	8
(Switzerland) Silvana Tirinzoni	0	0	0	2	0	2	1	0	5

Team	1	2	3	4	5	6	7	8	Final
(Saskatchewan) Jolene Campbell	0	0	1	1	0	X	X	X	2
(Manitoba) Michelle Englot 🔨	2	2	0	0	4	X	X	X	8

Team	1	2	3	4	5	6	7	8	Final
(Japan) Chiaki Matsumura 🔨	0	0	1	3	2	X	X	X	6
(Manitoba) Rachel Burtnyk	0	0	0	0	0	X	X	X	0

=== Draw 11 ===
Sunday, October 23, 5:00 pm

Team	1	2	3	4	5	6	7	8	Final
(Ontario) Sherry Middaugh 🔨	0	2	0	1	0	2	0	0	5
(Saskatchewan) Sherry Anderson	0	0	1	0	3	0	2	3	9

Team	1	2	3	4	5	6	7	8	Final
(Ontario) Rachel Homan 🔨	2	0	0	1	0	1	0	3	7
(Sweden) Margaretha Sigfridsson	0	1	1	0	0	0	1	0	3

Team	1	2	3	4	5	6	7	8	Final
(Manitoba) Jennifer Jones 🔨	1	0	0	3	0	1	0	3	8
(Ontario) Krista McCarville	0	0	1	0	2	0	1	0	4

Team	1	2	3	4	5	6	7	8	Final
(Manitoba) Kerri Einarson	0	1	0	0	0	1	0	X	2
(China) Wang Bingyu 🔨	1	0	0	2	1	0	2	X	6

=== Draw 12 ===
Sunday, October 23, 8:30 pm

Team	1	2	3	4	5	6	7	8	Final
(Manitoba) Jennifer Jones	0	0	1	4	0	0	2	X	7
(Ontario) Sherry Middaugh 🔨	0	2	0	0	2	0	0	X	4

Team	1	2	3	4	5	6	7	8	Final
(Manitoba) Shannon Birchard 🔨	0	2	0	1	0	1	0	1	5
(United States) Jamie Sinclair	0	0	0	0	1	0	1	0	2

Team	1	2	3	4	5	6	7	8	Final
(Manitoba) Michelle Englot 🔨	1	0	0	1	1	0	X	X	3
(Japan) Chiaki Matsumura	0	0	4	0	0	4	X	X	8

Team	1	2	3	4	5	6	7	8	Final
(China) Wang Bingyu	2	0	2	0	1	0	1	1	7
(Sweden) Margaretha Sigfridsson 🔨	0	1	0	4	0	1	0	0	6

== Playoffs ==
Quarterfinals
A1	(Sweden) Anna Hasselborg	7
C1	(Manitoba) Jennifer Jones	3
B2	(Ontario) Rachel Homan	7
C2	(Manitoba) Shannon Birchard	2
B1	(Saskatchewan) Sherry Anderson	5
C3	(Japan) Chiaki Matsumura	6
A2	(Ontario) Tracy Fleury	3
C4	(China) Wang Bingyu	5

Semifinals
A1	(Sweden) Anna Hasselborg	2
B2	(Ontario) Rachel Homan	4
C3	(Japan) Chiaki Matsumura	6
C4	(China) Wang Bingyu	5

Final
B2	(Ontario) Rachel Homan	9
C3	(Japan) Chiaki Matsumura	4

=== Quarterfinals ===
Monday, October 24, 10:00 am

Team	1	2	3	4	5	6	7	8	Final
(Sweden) Anna Hasselborg 🔨	1	1	0	1	0	0	4	X	7
(Manitoba) Jennifer Jones	0	0	1	0	1	1	0	X	3

Team	1	2	3	4	5	6	7	8	Final
(Ontario) Rachel Homan 🔨	0	2	0	0	3	2	X	X	7
(Manitoba) Shannon Birchard	0	0	1	1	0	0	X	X	2

Team	1	2	3	4	5	6	7	8	9	Final
(Saskatchewan) Sherry Anderson 🔨	1	0	2	1	0	1	0	0	0	5
(Japan) Chiaki Matsumura	0	4	0	0	0	0	0	1	1	6

Team	1	2	3	4	5	6	7	8	Final
(Ontario) Tracy Fleury 🔨	0	0	2	1	0	0	0	0	3
(China) Wang Bingyu	1	1	0	0	0	2	0	1	5

=== Semifinals ===
Monday, October 24, 2:00 pm

Team	1	2	3	4	5	6	7	8	Final
(Sweden) Anna Hasselborg 🔨	0	0	0	1	0	1	0	0	2
(Ontario) Rachel Homan	0	1	1	0	1	0	0	1	4

Team	1	2	3	4	5	6	7	8	9	Final
(Japan) Chiaki Matsumura	0	0	2	0	1	2	0	0	1	6
(China) Wang Bingyu 🔨	0	3	0	1	0	0	0	1	0	5

=== Final ===
Monday, October 24, 6:00 pm

Team	1	2	3	4	5	6	7	8	Final
(Ontario) Rachel Homan 🔨	2	0	4	0	3	0	X	X	9
(Japan) Chiaki Matsumura	0	1	0	2	0	1	X	X	4
