= 2020 World Mixed Doubles Curling Championship =

- Host city: Kelowna, Canada
- Arena: Kelowna Curling Club
- Dates: April 18–25, 2020 (cancelled)

The 2020 World Mixed Doubles Curling Championship was scheduled to be held from April 18 to 25, 2020 at the Kelowna Curling Club in Kelowna, Canada. On March 14, 2020, the event was cancelled due to the COVID-19 pandemic. The event was scheduled to be held in conjunction with the 2020 World Senior Curling Championships.

The event was supposed to score Olympic qualifying points for the participating nations. Upon cancellation, the qualifying process was left unclear. It was later announced that any country that was scheduled to compete in the event and did not qualify through the 2021 World Championships will take part in an expanded final Olympic Qualification tournament that will be held in December 2021.

== Teams ==
The teams were to be:

Australia	Canada	China	Czech Republic
Female: Tahli Gill; Male: Dean Hewitt	Female: Male:	Female: Yang Ying; Male: Ling Zhi	Female: Male:
England	Estonia	Finland	Germany
Female: Male:	Female: Marie Turmann; Male: Harri Lill	Female: Male:	Female: Male:
Hungary	Italy	Japan	New Zealand
Female: Dorottya Palancsa; Male: Zsolt Kiss	Female: Male:	Female: Chiaki Matsumura; Male: Yasumasa Tanida	Female: Male:
Norway	Russia	Scotland	South Korea
Female: Male:	Female: Anastasia Moskaleva; Male: Alexander Eremin	Female: Jennifer Dodds; Male: Bruce Mouat	Female: Jang Hye-ji; Male: Seong Yu-jin
Spain	Sweden	Switzerland	United States
Female: Male:	Female: Agnes Knochenhauer; Male: Rasmus Wranå	Female: Jenny Perret; Male: Martin Rios	Female: Tabitha Peterson; Male: Joe Polo
