= 2009 Swiss Olympic curling trials =

The 2009 Swiss Olympic curling trials were held October 12-14 in Arlesheim. The winning team represented Switzerland at the 2010 Winter Olympics.

Only a men's event was held. Mirjam Ott's women's team was the only team that entered for the women's event.

== Teams ==
Only two teams entered.

| Position | Basel | St. Moritz |
|---|---|---|
| Skip | Ralph Stöckli | Stefan Karnusian |
| Third | Jan Hauser | Christof Schwaller |
| Second | Markus Eggler | Robert Hürlimann |
| Lead | Simon Strübin | Rolf Iseli |

== Results ==
The event was a best of seven tournament.

| # | Stöckli | Karnusian | Rec. | Date |
|---|---|---|---|---|
| 1 | 7 | 6 | 1-0 | Oct. 12, 2009 |
| 2 | 9 | 4 | 2-0 | Oct. 12, 2009 |
| 3 | 3 | 5 | 2-1 | Oct. 13, 2009 |
| 4 | 8 | 7 | 3-1 | Oct. 13, 2009 |
| 5 | 7 | 4 | 4-1 | Oct. 14, 2009 |

Stöckli won best of 7, 4 games to 1.
