= 2021 Japanese Olympic mixed doubles curling trials =

2021 Japanese mixed doubles curling Olympic trials
- Host city: Wakkanai, Japan
- Arena: Wakkanai City Midori Sports Park
- Dates: September 18–20
- Winner: Matsumura / Tanida
- Female: Chiaki Matsumura
- Male: Yasumasa Tanida
- Finalist: Yoshida / Matsumura

The 2021 Japanese mixed doubles curling Olympic trials were held from September 18 to 20 at the Wakkanai City Midori Sports Park in Wakkanai, Japan. The winning pair of Chiaki Matsumura and Yasumasa Tanida earned the right to represent Japan at the Olympic Qualification Event where they finished with a 2–4 record, not advancing to the 2022 Winter Olympics in Beijing, China.

The event was held in a double round robin format between three teams: the 2020 Japanese Mixed Doubles champions Chiaki Matsumura and the Yasumasa Tanida, the 2021 Japanese Mixed Doubles champions Yurika Yoshida and Yuta Matsumura and the points leaders on the World Curling Tour as of January 1, 2021 Tomoko Takeda and Naomasa Takeda. After the round robin, the top two teams advanced to a best-of-three series to determine the champion.

== Teams ==
The teams are listed as follows:

Female	Male	Locale
Chiaki Matsumura	Yasumasa Tanida	Nagano / Sapporo
Tomoko Takeda	Naomasa Takeda	Nayoro
Yurika Yoshida	Yuta Matsumura	Kitami / Sapporo

== Round-robin standings ==
Final round-robin standings

Key
Teams to Championship Round

Team	W	L	W–L	DSC
Matsumura / Tanida	3	1	1–1	17.49
Yoshida / Matsumura	3	1	1–1	24.21
Takeda / Takeda	0	4	–	25.26

== Round-robin results ==
All draw times are listed in Japan Standard Time (UTC+09:00).

=== Draw 1 ===
Saturday, September 18, 8:00

Sheet C	1	2	3	4	5	6	7	8	Final
Yoshida / Matsumura	2	0	3	1	1	0	0	3	10
Takeda / Takeda	0	1	0	0	0	1	2	0	4

=== Draw 2 ===
Saturday, September 18, 12:00

Sheet C	1	2	3	4	5	6	7	8	Final
Takeda / Takeda	0	1	0	2	0	1	0	X	4
Matsumura / Tanida	1	0	2	0	2	0	2	X	7

=== Draw 3 ===
Saturday, September 18, 16:00

Sheet C	1	2	3	4	5	6	7	8	Final
Matsumura / Tanida	2	3	3	0	1	0	X	X	9
Yoshida / Matsumura	0	0	0	1	0	1	X	X	2

=== Draw 4 ===
Sunday, September 19, 8:00

Sheet C	1	2	3	4	5	6	7	8	Final
Takeda / Takeda	0	0	0	1	0	0	X	X	1
Yoshida / Matsumura	2	1	2	0	4	1	X	X	10

=== Draw 5 ===
Sunday, September 19, 12:00

Sheet C	1	2	3	4	5	6	7	8	Final
Matsumura / Tanida	0	2	2	0	0	2	0	1	7
Takeda / Takeda	1	0	0	1	2	0	2	0	6

=== Draw 6 ===
Sunday, September 19, 16:00

Sheet C	1	2	3	4	5	6	7	8	Final
Yoshida / Matsumura	3	0	0	2	0	1	1	X	7
Matsumura / Tanida	0	2	1	0	1	0	0	X	4

== Championship Round ==
Best-of-three
1	Matsumura / Tanida	7	8	X
2	Yoshida / Matsumura	5	7	X

=== Game 1 ===
Monday, September 20, 10:30

Sheet C	1	2	3	4	5	6	7	8	Final
Matsumura / Tanida	1	0	1	0	4	1	0	X	7
Yoshida / Matsumura	0	1	0	3	0	0	1	X	5

=== Game 2 ===
Monday, September 20, 15:30

Sheet C	1	2	3	4	5	6	7	8	Final
Matsumura / Tanida	0	1	0	2	0	4	0	1	8
Yoshida / Matsumura	1	0	2	0	3	0	1	0	7

== See also ==
- 2021 Japanese Olympic Curling Trials
