= 2021 Japanese Olympic curling trials =

- Host city: Wakkanai, Japan
- Arena: Wakkanai City Midori Sports Park
- Dates: September 10–12
- Winner: Loco Solare
- Curling club: Tokoro Curling Club, Kitami, Hokkaido
- Skip: Satsuki Fujisawa
- Third: Chinami Yoshida
- Second: Yumi Suzuki
- Lead: Yurika Yoshida
- Alternate: Kotomi Ishizaki
- Coach: Ryoji Onodera
- Finalist: Sayaka Yoshimura

The 2021 Japanese Olympic curling trials were held from September 10 to 12 at the Wakkanai City Midori Sports Park in Wakkanai, Japan. The winning Satsuki Fujisawa team earned the right to represent Japan at the Olympic Qualification Event where they finished in second place, qualifying for the 2022 Winter Olympics in Beijing, China. There was only a women's event, as the Yuta Matsumura rink had already been chosen to represent Japan in the men's event.

The event was held in a best-of-five series between the 2020 and 2021 Japanese champion rinks, Satsuki Fujisawa (Loco Solare) and Sayaka Yoshimura (Hokkaido Bank). Fujisawa could have secured her spot as the Olympic team by winning the 2021 championship, but fell short to Yoshimura 7–6 in the final. Team Yoshimura went on to represent Japan at the 2021 World Women's Curling Championship, where they finished with a disappointing 5–8 record. Prior to the playdown, both teams competed in one tour event, the 2021 Hokkaido Bank Curling Classic. There, Team Fujisawa qualified for the final and Team Yoshimura missed the playoffs. Team Fujisawa was also favored to win by the World Curling Federation's World Team Ranking System, as they ranked in fourth while Yoshimura ranked twelfth. All games were broadcast on NHK.

== Summary ==
Draw 1 was held Friday, September 10, at 3:00 pm local time. The game was tight all the way through, with Yoshimura taking a key two points in the eighth end and stealing one in the ninth to take the lead. After Fujisawa scored one in ten, Yoshimura took one in the extra end for the 7–6 victory. Saturday, September 11 featured two draws at 10:00 am and 3:00 pm. The first game was back-and-forth, with Yoshimura taking three in the sixth to lead 6–5. Fujisawa stole in the eighth before Yoshimura tied the score after nine ends. Fujisawa needed a draw to the four-foot on her final shot in the tenth, but came up light, resulting in another Yoshimura win. This meant Yoshimura only needed to win one more game to be the Olympic team. Fujisawa dominated the third game, taking an early 6–0 lead and retaining that for a 9–3 win. Draws 4 and 5 were held Sunday, September 12 at 10:00 am and 6:00 pm. Draw 4 was a close game, with teams trading singles and deuces up until the ninth end where Team Fujisawa stole a pivotal two points. This led to their 8–6 victory, meaning the series was tied at two games a piece. In the fifth and final draw, Fujisawa took the early lead, scoring deuces in the first and third ends to lead 4–2 after four. Yoshimura chipped the lead away with deuces in six and eight to trail 7–6 after nine ends. In the tenth end, up one with hammer, Fujisawa needed a draw to the four-foot for the win, which is exactly what she did. Fujisawa scored one, won the game 8–6 and became the Japanese team for the Olympic Qualification Event in December 2021. At the qualification event, Team Fujisawa finished second and secured Japan's berth to the Beijing Olympics.

== Teams ==
The teams are listed as follows:

Team	Skip	Third	Second	Lead	Alternate	Locale
Loco Solare	Satsuki Fujisawa	Chinami Yoshida	Yumi Suzuki	Yurika Yoshida	Kotomi Ishizaki	Kitami
Hokkaido Bank	Sayaka Yoshimura	Kaho Onodera	Anna Ohmiya	Yumie Funayama	Momoha Tabata	Sapporo

== Standings ==
Best-of-five
1	Satsuki Fujisawa	6	7	9	8	8
2	Sayaka Yoshimura	7	8	3	5	6

== Results ==
All draw times are listed in Japan Standard Time (UTC+09:00).

=== Draw 1 ===
Friday, September 10, 3:00 pm

Sheet B	1	2	3	4	5	6	7	8	9	10	11	Final
Satsuki Fujisawa 🔨	1	0	2	0	1	0	1	0	0	1	0	6
Sayaka Yoshimura	0	2	0	0	0	1	0	2	1	0	1	7

=== Draw 2 ===
Saturday, September 11, 10:00 am

Sheet B	1	2	3	4	5	6	7	8	9	10	Final
Sayaka Yoshimura	0	2	0	1	0	3	0	0	1	1	8
Satsuki Fujisawa 🔨	2	0	2	0	1	0	1	1	0	0	7

Player percentages
Team Yoshimura		Team Fujisawa	
Yumie Funayama	83%	Yurika Yoshida	91%
Anna Ohmiya	70%	Yumi Suzuki	90%
Kaho Onodera	75%	Chinami Yoshida	80%
Sayaka Yoshimura	71%	Satsuki Fujisawa	78%
Total	75%	Total	85%

=== Draw 3 ===
Saturday, September 11, 3:00 pm

Sheet B	1	2	3	4	5	6	7	8	9	10	Final
Satsuki Fujisawa 🔨	2	2	1	1	0	2	1	0	X	X	9
Sayaka Yoshimura	0	0	0	0	1	0	0	2	X	X	3

Player percentages
Team Fujisawa		Team Yoshimura	
Yurika Yoshida	95%	Yumie Funayama	95%
Yumi Suzuki	88%	Anna Ohmiya	80%
Chinami Yoshida	94%	Kaho Onodera	90%
Satsuki Fujisawa	98%	Sayaka Yoshimura	59%
Total	94%	Total	81%

=== Draw 4 ===
Sunday, September 12, 10:00 am

Sheet B	1	2	3	4	5	6	7	8	9	10	Final
Sayaka Yoshimura	0	2	0	2	0	0	1	0	0	X	5
Satsuki Fujisawa 🔨	2	0	1	0	0	1	0	2	2	X	8

Player percentages
Team Yoshimura		Team Fujisawa	
Yumie Funayama	93%	Yurika Yoshida	94%
Anna Ohmiya	81%	Yumi Suzuki	85%
Kaho Onodera	84%	Chinami Yoshida	95%
Sayaka Yoshimura	75%	Satsuki Fujisawa	88%
Total	83%	Total	90%

=== Draw 5 ===
Sunday, September 12, 6:00 pm

Sheet B	1	2	3	4	5	6	7	8	9	10	Final
Satsuki Fujisawa 🔨	2	0	2	0	1	0	2	0	0	1	8
Sayaka Yoshimura	0	1	0	1	0	2	0	2	0	0	6

== See also ==
- 2021 Japanese mixed doubles curling Olympic Trials
