= 2022–23 curling season =

- Sport: Curling

Seasons
- ← 2021–22 2023–24 →

The 2022–23 curling season began in June 2022 and ended in May 2023.

Note: In events with two genders, the men's tournament winners will be listed before the women's tournament winners.

== World Curling Federation events ==
=== Championships ===
Event			Gold	Silver	Bronze
World Mixed Curling Championship; Aberdeen, Scotland, Oct. 15–22			Canada (Ménard)	Scotland (Bryce)	Switzerland (Hegner)
Pan Continental Curling Championships; Calgary, Alberta, Canada, Oct. 31 – Nov. 6	A	M	Canada (Gushue)	South Korea (Jeong)	United States (Dropkin)
Pan Continental Curling Championships; Calgary, Alberta, Canada, Oct. 31 – Nov. 6	A	W	Japan (Fujisawa)	South Korea (Ha)	Canada (Einarson)
Pan Continental Curling Championships; Calgary, Alberta, Canada, Oct. 31 – Nov. 6	B	M	Guyana (Husain)	India (Raju)	Hong Kong (Chang)
Pan Continental Curling Championships; Calgary, Alberta, Canada, Oct. 31 – Nov. 6	B	W	Chinese Taipei (Lin)	Mexico (Camarena)	Kenya (Njuguna)
World Wheelchair-B Curling Championship; Lohja, Finland, Nov. 5–10			Czech Republic (Selnekovičová)	Denmark (Ørbæk)	Germany (Möller)
European Curling Championships; Östersund, Sweden, Nov. 18–26	A	M	Scotland (Mouat)	Switzerland (Schwaller)	Italy (Retornaz)
European Curling Championships; Östersund, Sweden, Nov. 18–26	A	W	Denmark (Dupont)	Switzerland (Tirinzoni)	Scotland (Morrison)
European Curling Championships; Östersund, Sweden, Nov. 18–26	B	M	Netherlands (Gösgens)	Finland (Kiiskinen)	France (Mercier)
European Curling Championships; Östersund, Sweden, Nov. 18–26	B	W	Estonia (Kaldvee)	Czech Republic (Zelingrová)	Lithuania (Paulauskaitė)
World Junior-B Curling Championships; Lohja, Finland, Dec. 8–19		M	China (Fei)	Italy (Colli)	Turkey (Karagöz)
World Junior-B Curling Championships; Lohja, Finland, Dec. 8–19		W	Canada (Deschenes)	Scotland (Henderson)	South Korea (Kang)
World University Games; Lake Placid, New York, United States, Jan. 13–21		M	Great Britain (Craik)	United States (Casper)	Canada (Purcell)
World University Games; Lake Placid, New York, United States, Jan. 13–21		W	China (Han)	South Korea (Ha)	United States (Strouse)
World Junior Curling Championships; Füssen, Germany, Feb. 25 – Mar. 4		M	China (Fei)	Germany (Kapp)	Scotland (Carson)
World Junior Curling Championships; Füssen, Germany, Feb. 25 – Mar. 4		W	Scotland (Henderson)	Japan (Miura)	Norway (Bjørnstad)
World Wheelchair Curling Championship; Richmond, British Columbia, Canada, Mar. 4–12			China (Wang)	Canada (Ideson)	Scotland (Nibloe)
World Wheelchair Mixed Doubles Curling Championship; Richmond, British Columbia, Canada, Mar. 4–12			Latvia (Rožkova / Lasmans)	United States (Wilson / Samsa)	Canada (Joseph / Thiessen)
World Women's Curling Championship; Sandviken, Sweden, Mar. 18–26			Switzerland (Tirinzoni)	Norway (Rørvik)	Canada (Einarson)
World Men's Curling Championship; Ottawa, Ontario, Canada, Apr. 1–9			Scotland (Mouat)	Canada (Gushue)	Switzerland (Schwaller)
World Senior Curling Championships; Gangneung, South Korea, Apr. 21–29		M	Canada (Rajala)	Scotland (Connal)	Switzerland (Schwaller)
World Senior Curling Championships; Gangneung, South Korea, Apr. 21–29		W	Canada (Anderson)	Scotland (Lockhart)	Japan (Kawamura)
World Mixed Doubles Curling Championship; Gangneung, South Korea, Apr. 22–29			United States (Thiesse / Dropkin)	Japan (Matsumura / Tanida)	Norway (Rønning / Brænden)
European Curling Championships; Dumfries, Scotland, Apr. 29 – May 6	C	M	Ukraine (Nikolov)	Liechtenstein (Matt)	Poland (Stych)
European Curling Championships; Dumfries, Scotland, Apr. 29 – May 6	C	W	Poland (Lipinska)	Slovakia (Kajanova)	Ireland (Barron)

=== Qualification events ===
Event	Qualifiers
World Mixed Doubles Qualification Event; Dumfries, Scotland, Dec. 2–7	Austria; Spain; Netherlands; Turkey

== Other events ==
Event		Winning skip	Runner-up skip
United States World University Games Playdowns; Fargo, North Dakota, Oct. 21–23	M	(Minnesota) Daniel Casper	(Minnesota) Ethan Sampson
United States World University Games Playdowns; Fargo, North Dakota, Oct. 21–23	W	(Minnesota) Delaney Strouse	(North Dakota) Christine McMakin
Chairman's Cup; Uiseong, South Korea, Nov. 15–18 (Team); Nov. 19–23 (Mixed Doubles)	M	Jeong Byeong-jin	Kim Soo-hyuk
Chairman's Cup; Uiseong, South Korea, Nov. 15–18 (Team); Nov. 19–23 (Mixed Doubles)	W	Kim Eun-jung	Gim Eun-ji
Chairman's Cup; Uiseong, South Korea, Nov. 15–18 (Team); Nov. 19–23 (Mixed Doubles)	MD	Kim Seon-yeong / Jeong Yeong-seok	Lee Eun-chae / Kim Min-woo

== Curling Canada events ==
=== Championships ===
Event		Gold	Silver	Bronze
World University Games Qualifier; Ottawa, Ontario, Sep. 22–25	M	(Nova Scotia) Dalhousie Tigers (Purcell)	(Ontario) Wilfrid Laurier Golden Hawks (Mooibroek)	Alberta Golden Bears (Jacques)
World University Games Qualifier; Ottawa, Ontario, Sep. 22–25	W	Alberta Pandas (Marks)	(Saskatchewan) Regina Rams (Englot)	(Ontario) Waterloo Warriors (Ford)
Canadian Mixed Curling Championship; Prince Albert, Saskatchewan, Nov. 6–12		Quebec (Asselin)	Northern Ontario (Bonot)	Northwest Territories (Koe)
Canadian Curling Club Championships; Edmonton, Alberta, Nov. 21–26	M	Ontario (Balsdon)	Quebec (Gibeau)	Alberta (Johnson)
Canadian Curling Club Championships; Edmonton, Alberta, Nov. 21–26	W	New Brunswick (Park)	Ontario (Cadorin)	Nova Scotia (Harrison)
Canadian Senior Curling Championships; Yarmouth, Nova Scotia, Dec. 4–10	M	Ontario (Rajala)	Alberta (Pahl)	Manitoba (Neufeld)
Canadian Senior Curling Championships; Yarmouth, Nova Scotia, Dec. 4–10	W	Saskatchewan (Anderson)	Quebec (Osborne)	Nova Scotia (Breen)
Subway AUS Curling Championships; Fredericton, New Brunswick, Feb. 2–5	M	(Nova Scotia) Dalhousie Tigers (McEachren)	(Nova Scotia) Saint Mary's Huskies (Kavanaugh)	(New Brunswick) UNB Reds (Stewart)
Subway AUS Curling Championships; Fredericton, New Brunswick, Feb. 2–5	W	(Nova Scotia) Dalhousie Tigers (Callaghan)	(Prince Edward Island) UPEI Panthers (MacLean)	(Newfoundland and Labrador) Memorial Sea-Hawks (Mitchell)
Canadian U18 Curling Championships; Timmins, Ontario, Feb. 5–11	M	Alberta 2 (Davies)	Nova Scotia 1 (Mosher)	Nova Scotia 2 (MacIsaac)
Canadian U18 Curling Championships; Timmins, Ontario, Feb. 5–11	W	Alberta 1 (Plett)	New Brunswick 2 (Forsythe)	Nova Scotia 2 (Blades)
Scotties Tournament of Hearts; Kamloops, British Columbia, Feb. 17–26		Canada (Einarson)	Manitoba (Jones)	Northern Ontario (McCarville)
Canada Winter Games; Summerside & Montague, Prince Edward Island, Feb. 19 – Mar. 5	M	Nova Scotia (MacIsaac)	British Columbia (Parkinson)	Ontario (Stratton)
Canada Winter Games; Summerside & Montague, Prince Edward Island, Feb. 19 – Mar. 5	W	Nova Scotia (Blades)	Alberta (Plett)	Quebec (Fortin)
Canada Winter Games; Summerside & Montague, Prince Edward Island, Feb. 19 – Mar. 5	MD	Alberta (Raniseth / Crough)	Ontario (Zemmelink / Mulima)	Quebec (Cheal / Maurice)
Tim Hortons Brier; London, Ontario, Mar. 3–12		Canada (Gushue)	Manitoba (Dunstone)	(Alberta) Wild Card #1 (Bottcher)
U Sports/Curling Canada University Curling Championships; Sudbury, Ontario, Mar. 15–19	M	(Ontario) Wilfrid Laurier Golden Hawks (Mooibroek)	(Nova Scotia) Dalhousie Tigers (McEachren)	(Ontario) Queen's Golden Gaels (Purdy)
U Sports/Curling Canada University Curling Championships; Sudbury, Ontario, Mar. 15–19	W	Alberta Pandas (Gray-Withers)	(Nova Scotia) Dalhousie Tigers (Callaghan)	(Ontario) Laurentian Voyageurs (Croisier)
CCAA/Curling Canada College Curling Championships; Sudbury, Ontario, Mar. 15–19	M	(Ontario) Humber Hawks (Dobson)	(Alberta) SAIT Trojans (Helston)	(Ontario) Mohawk Mountaineers (Jones)
CCAA/Curling Canada College Curling Championships; Sudbury, Ontario, Mar. 15–19	W	(Alberta) Augustana Vikings (Zimmerman)	(Ontario) Niagara Knights (Randell)	(Alberta) Concordia Thunder (Wood)
Canadian Wheelchair Curling Championship; Moose Jaw, Saskatchewan, Mar. 20–24		Saskatchewan 1 (Dash)	Northern Ontario (Dean)	Alberta 1 (Smart)
Canadian Mixed Doubles Curling Championship; Sudbury, Ontario, Mar. 21–26		(Ontario) Jones / Laing	(Alberta) Peterman / Gallant	(Alberta) (British Columbia) Homan / Tardi (Alberta) Tran / Sluchinski
Canadian Junior Curling Championships; Rouyn-Noranda, Quebec, Mar. 25 – Apr. 2	M	Alberta 2 (Tao)	Northern Ontario (Burgess)	Manitoba 1 (McDonald)
Canadian Junior Curling Championships; Rouyn-Noranda, Quebec, Mar. 25 – Apr. 2	W	Alberta 1 (Plett)	Newfoundland and Labrador (Mitchell)	Manitoba (Terrick)

=== Invitationals ===
Event		Winning skip	Runner-up skip
PointsBet Invitational; Fredericton, New Brunswick, Sep. 21–25	M	(Manitoba) Reid Carruthers	(Manitoba) Matt Dunstone
PointsBet Invitational; Fredericton, New Brunswick, Sep. 21–25	W	(Manitoba) Jennifer Jones	(Alberta) Kristie Moore

=== Provincial and territorial playdowns ===
Province/ territory	Women			Men		
Province/ territory	Event	Champion	Runner-up	Event	Champion	Runner-up
Alberta; Wetaskiwin, Jan. 18–22 (Women's); Edmonton, Feb. 8–12 (Men's)	Alberta Scotties	Kayla Skrlik	Casey Scheidegger	Boston Pizza Cup	Kevin Koe	Brendan Bottcher
British Columbia; Chilliwack, Jan. 11–15	British Columbia Scotties	Clancy Grandy	Corryn Brown	BC Men's Championship	Jacques Gauthier	Brent Pierce
Manitoba; East St. Paul, Jan. 25–29 (Women's); Neepawa, Feb. 9–12 (Men's)	Manitoba Scotties	Jennifer Jones	Meghan Walter	Viterra Championship	Matt Dunstone	Reid Carruthers
New Brunswick; Fredericton, Jan. 18–22 (Women's); Moncton, Feb. 8–12 (Men's)	New Brunswick Scotties	Andrea Kelly	Abby Burgess	New Brunswick Tankard	Scott Jones	Jason Roach
Newfoundland and Labrador; St. John's, Jan. 25–29	Newfoundland and Labrador Scotties	Stacie Curtis	Heather Strong	Newfoundland and Labrador Tankard	Nathan Young	Greg Smith
Northern Ontario; Kenora, Jan. 25–29	Northern Ontario Scotties	Krista McCarville	Krysta Burns	Northern Ontario Men's Provincial Championship	Tanner Horgan	Sandy MacEwan
Northwest Territories; Inuvik, Jan. 11–15 (Women's); Fort Smith, Feb. 1–6 (Men's)	Northwest Territories Scotties	Kerry Galusha	Reese Wainman	Northwest Territories Men's Championship	Jamie Koe	Greg Skauge
Nova Scotia; New Glasgow, Jan. 25–30	Nova Scotia Scotties	Christina Black	Tanya Hilliard	Nova Scotia Tankard	Matthew Manuel	Owen Purcell
Nunavut; Iqaluit, Dec. 16–18	Nunavut Scotties	Brigitte MacPhail	Angela Dale	Nunavut Brier Playdowns	Jake Higgs	Peter Mackey
Ontario; Port Elgin, Jan. 23–29	Ontario Scotties	Rachel Homan	Hollie Duncan	Ontario Tankard	Mike McEwen	Glenn Howard
Prince Edward Island; Crapaud, Jan. 25–29	Prince Edward Island Scotties	Suzanne Birt	Melissa Morrow	Prince Edward Island Tankard	Tyler Smith	Darren Higgins
Quebec; Alma, Jan. 10–15	Quebec Scotties	Laurie St-Georges	Lauren Horton	Hardline Tankard	Félix Asselin	Vincent Roberge
Saskatchewan; Estevan, Jan. 25–29 (Women's); Feb. 1–5 (Men's)	Saskatchewan Scotties	Robyn Silvernagle	Nancy Martin	SaskTel Tankard	Kelly Knapp	Steve Laycock
Yukon; Whitehorse, Jan. 13–16	Yukon Scotties	Hailey Birnie	–	Yukon Men's Championship	Thomas Scoffin	Andrew Komlodi

== National championships ==
=== Australia ===
Event	Gold	Silver	Bronze
Australian Men's Curling Championship; Naseby, New Zealand, Aug. 15–19	Jay Merchant	Hugh Millikin	Jonathan Imlah
Australian Women's Curling Championship; Naseby, New Zealand, Aug. 15–19	Jennifer Westhagen	Tahli Gill	Helen Williams
Australian Mixed Curling Championship; Naseby, New Zealand, Aug. 19–21	Amanda Hlushak	Dustin Armstrong	Matt Panoussi
Australian Mixed Doubles Curling Championship; Naseby, New Zealand, Dec. 15–18	Gill / Hewitt	Westhagen / Panoussi	Boersen / Francey

=== Brazil ===
Event	Gold	Silver	Bronze
Brazilian Men's Curling Championship; São Paulo, Aug. 7–10	Marcelo Mello	Felipe Pires	—
Brazilian Mixed Doubles Curling Championship; São Paulo, Aug. 7–10	Oliveira / Mello	Sumi / Losso	Tieme / Vilela; Souza / Alves

=== China ===
Chinese Curling League

Event		Gold	Silver	Bronze
Yichun; Yichun, Jilin, Nov. 13–19	Men's	National Training Team (Ma)	Heilongjiang (Ding/Li)	Jilin (Tian)
Yichun; Yichun, Jilin, Nov. 13–19	Women's	National Training Team (Zhang)	Harbin (Wang)	Jilin (Han)
Yichun; Yichun, Jilin, Nov. 13–19	Mixed Doubles	Beijing (Han/Ling)	Jilin (Ding/Li)	Harbin (Yin/Meng)
Jizhou; Jizhou, Tianjin, Dec. 1–7	Men's	National Training Team (Ma)	Heilongjiang (Zang)	Harbin (Zou)
Jizhou; Jizhou, Tianjin, Dec. 1–7	Women's	National Training Team (Zhang)	Heilongjiang (Han)	Harbin (Wang)
Jizhou; Jizhou, Tianjin, Dec. 1–7	Mixed Doubles	Beijing (Han/Ling)	Tianjin (Gao/Qian)	Harbin (Yin/Meng)
Zhangjiakou; Zhangjiakou, Hebei, Dec. 16–22	Men's	National Training Team (Ma)	Harbin (Zou)	Heilongjiang (Zang)
Zhangjiakou; Zhangjiakou, Hebei, Dec. 16–22	Women's	National Training team (Zhang)	Inner Mongolia (Guo)	Jilin (Han)
Zhangjiakou; Zhangjiakou, Hebei, Dec. 16–22	Mixed Doubles	Harbin (Yu/Wang)	Qianghai (Zhang/Qi)	Jilin (Ding/Li)
Xining; Xining, Qinghai, Jan. 6–12	Men's	Harbin (Zou)	Heilongjiang (Zang)	National Training Team (Ma)
Xining; Xining, Qinghai, Jan. 6–12	Women's	Harbin (Wang)	Heilongjiang (Han)	Jilin (Han)
Xining; Xining, Qinghai, Jan. 6–12	Mixed Double	Qinghai (Zhang/Meng)	National Training Team (Li/Xu)	Harbin (Yu/Wang)
Overall	Men's	National Training Team (Ma)	Harbin (Zou)	Heilongjiang (Zang)
Overall	Women's	National Training Team (Zhang)	Harbin (Wang)	Jilin (Han)
Overall	Mixed Doubles	Harbin (Yu/Wang)	Beijing (Han/Ling)	Jilin (Ding/Li)

Chinese Curling Championships

Event	Gold	Silver	Bronze
Chinese Men's Curling Championship; Jizhou, Tianjin, Feb. 12–17	Harbin 1 (Ma)	Harbin 2 (Zou)	Chinese National Youth Team (Fei)
Chinese Women's Curling Championship; Jizhou, Tianjin, Feb. 7–11	Harbin 1 (Mei)	Jilin (Liu)	Zhejiang (Yue)
Chinese Mixed Doubles Curling Championship; Jizhou, Tianjin, Feb. 7–14	Inner Mongolia 1 (He / Hao)	Jilin 1 (Li / Li)	Harbin 2 (Wang / Gong)

=== Czech Republic ===
Event	Gold	Silver	Bronze
Czech Mixed Doubles Curling Championship; Prague, Feb. 4–7	Julie Zelingrová / Vít Chabičovský	Kristýna Farková / David Jakl	Karolína Frederiksen / Tomáš Válek
Czech Men's Curling Championship; Prague, Feb. 16–20	Lukáš Klíma	David Šik	Tomáš Paul
Czech Women's Curling Championship; Prague, Feb. 16–20	Alžběta Anna Zelingrová	Hana Synáčková	Lenka Hronová

=== Denmark ===
Event	Gold	Silver	Bronze
Danish Mixed Doubles Curling Championship; Gentofte, Feb. 3–5	Lander / Holtermann	Clifford / Søe	K. Schmidt / J. Schmidt

=== England ===
Event	Gold	Silver	Bronze
English Men's Curling Championship; Dumfries, Scotland, Feb. 23–26	Rob Retchless	Fraser Clark	Andrew Woolston
English Women's Curling Championship; Dumfries, Scotland, Feb. 23–26	Anna Fowler	Lisa Farnell	—

=== Estonia ===
Event	Gold	Silver	Bronze
Estonian Men's Curling Championship; Tallinn, Jan. 12–15	Eduard Veltsman	Kaarel Holm	Andres Jakobson
Estonian Women's Curling Championship; TBD, TBD			
Estonian Mixed Doubles Curling Championship; Tallinn, Feb. 23–27	Marie Kaldvee / Harri Lill	Kaidi Elmik / Mihhail Vlassov	Ingrid Novikova / Andres Jakobson
Estonian Mixed Curling Championship; Tallinn, May 11–14	Harri Lill	Marie Kaldvee	Eduard Veltsman

(source:)

=== Finland ===
Event	Gold	Silver	Bronze
Finnish Women's Curling Championship; Joensuu, Feb. 17–19	Miia Ahrenberg	Emmi Lindroos	Elina Virtaala
Finnish Mixed Doubles Curling Championship; Joensuu, Jan. 6-8, Feb. 24–26	Lotta Immonen / Markus Sipilä	Elina Virtaala / Ville Forsström	Tiina Suuripää / Tomi Rantamäki
Finnish Men's Curling Championship; Harjavalta, Turku, Joensuu, Dec. 16 – Mar. 19	Kalle Kiiskinen	Matias Hänninen	Jermu Pöllänen

=== Italy ===
Event	Gold	Silver	Bronze
Italian Men's Curling Championship; Nov. 12 – Feb. 12, Mar. 5–6	Joël Retornaz	Giacomo Colli	Marco Onnis
Italian Women's Curling Championship; Nov. 12 – Feb. 12, Mar. 4–5	Stefania Constantini	Denise Pimpini	Giada Mosaner
Italian Mixed Doubles Curling Championship; Pinerolo, Mar. 11–12	Constantini / Arman	Zardini Lacedelli / De Zanna	Cobelli / Mosaner
Italian Mixed Curling Championship; Nov. 19 – Mar. 21, Apr. 1–2	Barbara Gentile	Emanuela Cavallo	Denise Pimpini

=== Japan ===
Event	Gold	Silver	Bronze
Japan Men's Curling Championship; Kitami, Jan. 29 – Feb. 5	Riku Yanagisawa	Kohsuke Hirata	Shinya Abe
Japan Women's Curling Championship; Kitami, Jan. 29 – Feb. 5	Satsuki Fujisawa	Asuka Kanai	Ikue Kitazawa
Japan Mixed Doubles Curling Championship; Wakkanai, Feb. 21–26	Matsumura/Tanida (Nagano / Hokkaido); M: Yasumasa Tanida; W: Chiaki Matsumura; C: Emi Shimizu	Koana/Aoki (Yamanashi / Hokkaido); M: Go Aoki; W: Tori Koana; C: Yoshinori Aoki	Yoshida/Matsumura (Hokkaido / Nagano); M: Yuta Matsumura; W: Yurika Yoshida; C: Yusuke Morozumi

=== Latvia ===
Event	Gold	Silver	Bronze
Latvian Mixed Curling Championship; Riga, Jan. 12–15	CC Rīga/Veidemanis (Arnis Veidemanis)	SK OB/Zass (Kristaps Zass)	SK OB/Regža (Ansis Regža)
Latvian Wheelchair Mixed Doubles Curling Championship; Riga, Jan. 16–19	Poļina Rožkova / Aleksandrs Dimbovskis	Diāna Ponaskova / Agris Lasmans	Ieva Melle / Ojārs Briedis
Latvian Mixed Doubles Curling Championship; Riga, Feb. 16–19	Ventspils Kērlinga klubs (Santa Blumberga-Bērziņa / Andris Bremanis)	Sporta klubs "OB" (Evita Regža / Renars Freidensons)	Klubs "A41" (Līga Avena / Aivars Avotiņš)
Latvian Junior Curling Championships; Riga, Mar. 13–17			
Latvian Women's Curling Championship; Riga, Apr. 20–23	JKK/Barone E. (Evelīna Barone)	VKK/Blumberga-Bērziņa (Santa Blumberga-Bērziņa)	KKR/Barone D. (Daina Barone)
Latvian Wheelchair Curling Championship; Riga, Apr. 25–27	KKR/Briedis (Ojārs Briedis)	Alliance/Rožkova (Poļina Rožkova)	-
Latvian Men's Curling Championship; Riga, May 4–7	CC Rīga/Trukšāns (Mārtiņš Trukšāns)	A41/Gulbis (Ritvars Gulbis)	CC Rīga/Veidemanis (Arnis Veidemanis)

(source:)

=== Netherlands ===
Event	Gold	Silver	Bronze
Dutch National Mixed Doubles Championship; Zoetermeer, Sep. 23–25	Bomas / Gösgens	Tonoli / Magan	—

=== New Zealand ===
Event	Gold	Silver	Bronze
New Zealand Men's Curling Championship; Naseby, Jun. 16–19	Sean Becker	Peter de Boer	Anton Hood
New Zealand Women's Curling Championship; Naseby, Jun. 16–19	Jessica Smith	Eleanor Adviento	Michelle Bong

=== Norway ===
Event	Gold	Silver	Bronze
Norwegian Mixed Doubles Curling Championship; Haugesund, Jan. 27–29	Martine Rønning / Mathias Brænden	Maia Ramsfjell / Magnus Ramsfjell	Ingvild Skaga / Nicolai Sommervold
Norwegian Men's Curling Championship; Oppdal, Mar. 9–12	Magnus Ramsfjell	Lukas Høstmælingen	Steffen Walstad
Norwegian Women's Curling Championship; Lillehammer, Mar. 9–12	Marianne Rørvik	Ingvild Skaga	Eirin Mesloe
Norwegian Mixed Curling Championship; Trondheim, Apr. 21–23	Steffen Walstad	Andreas Hårstad	Ingvild Skaga

(source:)

=== Russia ===
Event	Gold	Silver	Bronze
Russian Mixed Curling Cup; Irkutsk, Aug. 25–29	Alexey Timofeev	Oleg Krasikov	Ivan Kazachkov
Russian Mixed Doubles Curling Cup; Irkutsk, Sep. 1–4	Krasnoyarsk Krai 1 Christina Dudko / Vladislav Velichko	Irkutsk Oblast - Komsomoll 1 Elizaveta Trukhina / Nikolai Lysakov	Saint Petersburg 2 Nkeirouka Ezekh / Oleg Krasikov
Russian Men's Curling Cup; Samara, Dec. 4—8	Moscow Oblast 1 (Alexander Eremin)	Irkutsk Oblast - Komsomoll 1 (Mikhail Vlasenko)	Krasnodar Krai 1 (Sergey Glukhov)
Russian Women's Curling Cup; Samara, Dec. 10—14	Saint Petersburg 2 (Alina Kovaleva)	UOR 2 - Saint Petersburg 4 (Diana Margaryan)	Krasnodar Krai 2 (Anna Sidorova)
Russian Wheelchair Curling Cup; Novosibirsk, Dec. 17—22	Krasnodar Krai (Andrey Smirnov)	Moscow (Konstantin Kurokhtin)	Saint Petersburg 2 (Evgeny Sapetov)
Russian Mixed Doubles Curling Championship; Sochi, Jan. 19–26	Saint Petersburg 2 Nkeirouka Ezekh / Oleg Krasikov	Saint Petersburg 1 Alina Kovaleva / Alexey Timofeev	Irkutsk Oblast - Komsomoll 1 Elizaveta Trukhina / Nikolai Lysakov
Russian Women's Curling Championship; Sochi, Apr. 5–11	Krasnodar Krai 2 (Anna Sidorova)	Saint Petersburg 2 (Alina Kovaleva)	Moscow Oblast 1 (Vlada Rumiantseva)
Russian Men's Curling Championship; Sochi, Apr. 13–19	Saint Petersburg 1 (Alexey Timofeev)	Irkutsk Oblast - Komsomoll 1 (Mikhail Vlasenko)	Saint Petersburg 2 (Oleg Krasikov)
Russian Wheelchair Curling Championship; Novosibirsk, Apr. 20–28	Moscow; Konstantin Kurokhtin	Moscow Oblast; Valery Ulianov	Krasnoyarsk Krai 1 Evgeny Sapetov
Russian Mixed Curling Championship; Irkutsk, May 17–23	Moscow Oblast 1 (Mikhail Vaskov)	Irkutsk Oblast - Komsomoll 1 (Elizaveta Trukhina)	Novosibirsk Oblast 2 (Konstantin Kozich)

=== Scotland ===
Event	Gold	Silver	Bronze
Scottish Men's Curling Championship; Dumfries, Feb. 6–12	Bruce Mouat	James Craik	Ross Whyte
Scottish Women's Curling Championship; Dumfries, Feb. 6–12	Rebecca Morrison	Lesley Young	Lucy Blair
Scottish Mixed Doubles Curling Championship; Perth, Feb. 22–26	Dodds / Mouat	Jackson / McFadzean	MacDonald / Haswell; Aitken / Hardie

=== South Korea ===
Event	Gold	Silver	Bronze
Korean Men's Curling Championship; Jincheon, Jun. 11–17	Jeong Byeong-jin	Kim Chang-min	Jeong Yeong-seok
Korean Women's Curling Championship; Jincheon, Jun. 11–17	Ha Seung-youn	Gim Eun-ji	Shin Ga-yeong
Korean Mixed Doubles Curling Championship; Jincheon, Jul. 12–15	Kim J. / Jeong B.	Kim E. / Yoo	Kim S. / Jeong Y.

=== Sweden ===
Event	Gold	Silver	Bronze
Swedish Mixed Doubles Curling Championship; Norrköping, Dec. 16–18	Karlstads CK (Thunman / Magnusson)	Sundbybergs CK Team Ajiwa (Westman / Ahlberg)	Umeå CK/CK Granit (Wendel / Wingfors)
Swedish Men's Curling Championship; Karlstad, Feb. 2–5	Oskar Eriksson	Axel Landelius	Fredrik Nyman; Simon Granbom
Swedish Women's Curling Championship; Karlstad, Feb. 2–5	Anna Hasselborg	Isabella Wranå	Moa Dryburgh
Swedish Wheelchair Curling Championship; Karlstad, Feb. 1–5	Karlstads CK, Rullarnas 2 (Johanna Glennert)	Jönköping CC, Jönköping Energi 1 (Viljo Petersson-Dahl)	Härnösands CK, Lag Ulander (Kristina Ulander)
Swedish Mixed Curling Championship; Jönköping, Apr. 29 – May 1	Sundbybergs CK, Emoji Squad (Fanny Sjöberg)	Karlstads CK, Mabergs (Patric Mabergs)	Sundbybergs CK, Nygren (Johan Nygren)

=== Switzerland ===
Event		Gold	Silver	Bronze
Swiss Men's Curling Championship; Thônex, Feb. 11–18		Yannick Schwaller	Michael Brunner	Jan Hess
Swiss Women's Curling Championship; Thônex, Feb. 11–18		Silvana Tirinzoni	Corrie Hürlimann	Raphaela Keiser
Swiss Mixed Doubles Curling Championship; St. Gallen, Mar. 1–5		Schwaller-Hürlimann / Schwaller	Pätz / Michel	Rupp / Wunderlin
Swiss Mixed Curling Championship; Küssnacht am Rigi, Mar. 24–26		Ursula Hegner	Melanie Schnider	Simon Biedermann
Swiss Junior Curling Championships; St. Gallen, Mar. 17–19, 24–26	M	Manuel Jermann	Lars Brauchli	Kim Schwaller
Swiss Junior Curling Championships; St. Gallen, Mar. 17–19, 24–26	W	Xenia Schwaller	Isabel Einspieler	Ariane Oberson

=== United States ===
Event		Gold	Silver	Bronze
United States Wheelchair Mixed Doubles Curling Championship; Hartland, Wisconsin, Dec. 15–18		Pam Wilson / David Samsa	Laura Dwyer / Shawn Sadowski	Terri Meadows / David Box
United States U18 Curling Championships; Lafayette, Colorado, Jan. 12–15	M	Caden Hebert	Aiden Fitzgerald	Mason Guentzel
United States U18 Curling Championships; Lafayette, Colorado, Jan. 12–15	W	Sophia Ryhorchuk	Julia Pekowitz	Clare Viau
United States Men's Curling Championship; Denver, Colorado, Feb. 5–11		John Shuster	Daniel Casper	Korey Dropkin
United States Women's Curling Championship; Denver, Colorado, Feb. 6–11		Tabitha Peterson	Delaney Strouse	Sarah Anderson
United States Mixed Doubles Curling Championship; Kalamazoo, Michigan, Feb. 28. – Mar. 5		Cory Thiesse / Korey Dropkin	Sarah Anderson / Andrew Stopera	Vicky Persinger / Christopher Plys; Taylor Anderson / Ben Richardson
United States Senior Curling Championships; Seattle, Washington, Mar. 4–11	M	Joel Larway	Mike Farbelow	Paul Pustovar
United States Senior Curling Championships; Seattle, Washington, Mar. 4–11	W	Margie Smith	Tracy Lawless	Susan Dukes
United States Junior Curling Championships (U21); Wayland, Massachusetts, Apr. 3–8	M	Wesley Wendling	Caden Hebert	Nicholas Cenzalli
United States Junior Curling Championships (U21); Wayland, Massachusetts, Apr. 3–8	W	Miranda Scheel	Julia Pekowitz	Allory Johnson
United States Mixed Curling Championship; Golden, Colorado, Apr. 12–16		Jed Brundidge	Mike Siggins	Peter Stolt

(source for upcoming events:)

== Tour events ==
Grand Slam events in bold. Note: More events may be posted as time progresses.

=== Teams ===
See: List of teams in the 2022–23 curling season

=== World Curling Tour sanctioned events ===
==== Men's events ====
Week	Event	Winning skip	Runner-up skip	Purse (CAD)	Winner's share (CAD)	EC
9	Kudaka Erzurum WCT International Curling Cup; Erzurum, Turkey, Aug. 5–7	Cancelled				
11	Baden Masters; Baden, Switzerland, Aug. 19–21	(Norway) Steffen Walstad	(Netherlands) Wouter Gösgens	CHF 35,000	CHF 12,000	500
13	Adelboden International; Adelboden, Switzerland, Sep. 1–4	(Italy) Joël Retornaz	(Switzerland) Andrin Schnider	CHF 4,200	CHF 1,200	100
17	WCT Tallinn Mens International Challenger; Tallinn, Estonia, Sep. 29 – Oct. 2	(Scotland) Cameron Bryce	(Netherlands) Wouter Gösgens	€ 4,000	€ 1,200	100
19	Medicine Hat Charity Classic; Medicine Hat, Alberta, Oct. 13–16	Cancelled				
19	Curling Masters Champéry; Champéry, Switzerland, Oct. 13–16	(Norway) Magnus Ramsfjell	(Netherlands) Wouter Gösgens	CHF 28,000	CHF 8,000	500
20	WCT Latvian International Challenger; Tukums, Latvia, Oct. 21–23	(Latvia) Mārtiņš Trukšāns	(Estonia) Eduard Veltsman	€ 3,000	€ 1,000	100
21	Grand Prix Bern Inter; Bern, Switzerland, Oct. 28–31	(Italy) Joël Retornaz	(Netherlands) Wouter Gösgens	CHF 18,100	CHF 5,000	300
22	Raymond James Kelowna Double Cash; Kelowna, British Columbia, Nov. 3–6	Cancelled				
23	Prague Classic; Prague, Czech Republic, Nov. 10–13	(Sweden) Fredrik Nyman	(Czech Republic) Lukáš Klíma	€ 13,500	€ 4,500	300
23	Blazing Leaves; Bridgeport, Connecticut, Nov. 10–13	Cancelled				
33	St. Galler Elite Challenge; St. Gallen, Switzerland, Jan. 20–22	(Scotland) Cameron Bryce	(Switzerland) Michael Brunner	CHF 6,200	$5,856	100
34	Belgium Men's Challenger; Zemst, Belgium, Jan. 26–29	(Turkey) Uğurcan Karagöz	(South Korea) Jeong Byeong-jin	€ 2,800	€ 1,200	100
48	Obihiro ICE Gold Cup; Obihiro, Japan, May 3–7	(Japan) Takumi Maeda	(Japan) Fukuhiro Ohno	¥ 500,000	¥ 300,000	200

==== Women's events ====
Week	Event	Winning skip	Runner-up skip	Purse (CAD)	Winner's share (CAD)	EC
9	Kudaka Erzurum WCT International Curling Cup; Erzurum, Turkey, Aug. 5–7	Cancelled				
16	Women's Masters Basel; Arlesheim, Switzerland, Sep. 23–25	(Switzerland) Raphaela Keiser	(Switzerland) Michèle Jäggi	CHF 32,000	CHF 10,000	500
19	Medicine Hat Charity Classic; Medicine Hat, Alberta, Oct. 13–16	Cancelled				
20	WCT Latvian International Challenger; Tukums, Latvia, Oct. 21–23	(Switzerland) Corrie Hürlimann	(Scotland) Lucy Blair	€ 3,000	€ 1,000	100
22	WCT Tallinn Ladies International Challenger; Tallinn, Estonia, Nov. 3–6	(Estonia) Marie Kaldvee	(Germany) Sara Messenzehl	€ 4,000	€ 1,200	100
22	Sunset Ranch Kelowna Double Cash; Kelowna, British Columbia, Nov. 3–5	Cancelled				
23	Blazing Leaves; Bridgeport, Connecticut, Nov. 10–13	Cancelled				
30	New Year Medalist Curling; Miyota, Japan, Dec. 30 – Jan. 1	(Germany) Daniela Jentsch	(Japan) Asuka Kanai	¥ 2,000,000	¥ 1,000,000	300
33	St. Galler Elite Challenge; St. Gallen, Switzerland, Jan. 20–22	(Switzerland) Xenia Schwaller	(Scotland) Rebecca Morrison	CHF 4,600	$5,856	100
34	International Bernese Ladies Cup; Bern, Switzerland, Jan. 26–29	(Switzerland) Silvana Tirinzoni	(Sweden) Isabella Wranå	CHF 18,200	$8,782	300
35	Belgium Women's Challenger; Zemst, Belgium, Feb. 2–5	Cancelled				

==== Mixed doubles events ====
Week	Event	Winning pair	Runner-up pair	Purse (CAD)	Winner's share (CAD)	EC
7	Kazakhstan Curling Cup WCT Mixed Doubles; Almaty, Kazakhstan, Jul. 21–24	(Kazakhstan) Ebauyer / Zhumagozha	(Kazakhstan) Utochko / Garagul	$8,000 (US)	$2,500 (US)	500
10	WCT Argovia Mixed Doubles Masters; Aargau, Switzerland, Aug. 12–14	(Switzerland) Perret / Rios	(Switzerland) Rupp / Wunderlin	CHF 8,300	CHF 2,600	500
16	WCT Tallinn Mixed Doubles International; Tallinn, Estonia, Sep. 22–25	(Norway) Rønning / Brænden	(Latvia) Barone / Veidemanis	€ 3,325	€ 1,000	300
16	Nazarbayev Curling Cup; Almaty, Kazakhstan, Sep. 22–25	Cancelled				
18	Mixed Doubles Bern; Bern, Switzerland Oct. 7–9	(Switzerland) Rupp / Wunderlin	(Sweden) Westman / Ahlberg	CHF 7,500	CHF 3,000	500
19	WCT Austrian Mixed Doubles Cup; Kitzbühel, Austria Oct. 13–16	(Germany) Schöll / Harsch	(Austria) Augustin / Reichel	€ 3,200	€ 1,000	100
23	Mixed Doubles Łódź; Łódź, Poland, Nov. 10–13	(Switzerland) Hüppi / Weiss	(Czech Republic) Jelínková / Mihola	€ 3,500	$1,236	300
25	WCT Latvian Mixed Doubles Curling Cup I Riga, Latvia, Nov. 25–27	(Norway) Mesloe / Næss	(Latvia) Regža / Freidensons	€ 3,500	€ 1,000	300
26	WCT Heracles Mixed Doubles Slovakia Cup; Bratislava, Slovakia, Dec. 1–4	Cancelled				
30	Gothenburg Mixed Doubles Cup; Gothenburg, Sweden, Dec. 28–30	(Sweden) Westman / Ahlberg	(Norway) Skaslien / Nedregotten	SEK 95,000	$2,000	500
30	Southern Mixed Doubles Cashspiel; Charlotte, North Carolina, Dec. 28–31	(United States) Anderson / Richardson	(United States) Thiesse / Dropkin	$4,500 (US)	$1,500 (US)	300
31	MadTown DoubleDown; McFarland, Wisconsin, Jan. 6–8	(Japan) Matsumura / Tanida	(Canada) Walker / Muyres	$20,500 (US)	$9,384	750
32	Dutch Masters Mixed Doubles; Zoetermeer, Netherlands, Jan. 13–15	(Denmark) Clifford / Søe	(United States) Farrell / Thurston	€ 3,500	€ 1,000	300
33	AHSLOVAKIA Mixed Doubles Cup; Bratislava, Slovakia, Jan. 19–23	Cancelled				
33	Prague Mixed Doubles Open; Prague, Czech Republic, Jan. 19–23	Cancelled				
34	Gefle Mixed Doubles Cup; Gävle, Sweden, Jan. 26–29	(Norway) Skaslien / Nedregotten	(Denmark) Lander / Holtermann	€ 4,500	€ 2,300	300
36	Hvidovre Mixed Doubles Cup; Hvidovre, Denmark, Feb. 10–12	(Denmark) Clifford / Søe	(Denmark) Lander / Holtermann	€ 2,500	€ 1,000	100
37	WCT Tallinn Masters Mixed Doubles; Tallinn, Estonia, Feb. 16–19	(Norway) Rønning / Brænden	(Estonia) Kaldvee / Lill	€ 3,250	€ 1,200	300
37	Cincinnati Mixed Doubles Cup; West Chester, Ohio, Feb. 17–19	(United States) Dunphy / Sethi	(United States) F. Allison / M. Allison	$4,500 (US)	$1,500 (US)	300
38	Pinerolo Mixed Doubles Cup; Pinerolo, Italy, Feb. 23–26	(Germany) Schöll / Harsch	(Italy) D. Pimpini / A. Pimpini	€ 2,950	€ 1,000	100
43	Mixed Doubles Prague Trophy; Prague, Czech Republic, Mar. 31 – Apr. 2	(Finland) Immonen / Sipilä	(Estonia) Kaldvee / Lill	€ 3,350	€ 1,450	300
44	WCT Latvian Mixed Doubles Curling Cup II; Riga, Latvia, Apr. 6–9	(Hungary) Joó / Tatár	(Estonia) Kaldvee / Lill	€ 1,000	$500	100
49	WCT Serbian Curling Jubilee Bonspiel; Belgrade, Serbia, May 11–14	Galkina / Timofeev	Riazanova / Vaskov	€ 10,000	€ 3,500	500

=== Other events ===
==== Men's events ====
Week	Event	Winning skip	Runner-up skip	Purse (CAD)	Winner's share (CAD)	SFM
1	Hokkaido Bank Curling Classic; Sapporo, Japan, Aug. 4–7	(South Korea) Jeong Byeong-jin	(Japan) Yusuke Morozumi	¥ 1,700,000	¥ 1,000,000	2.0000
1	Morris Men's Summer SunSpiel; Morris, Manitoba, Aug. 5–7	Cancelled				
2	Summer Series; Saint-Félicien, Quebec, Aug. 12–15	(Quebec) Vincent Roberge	(Quebec) Robert Desjardins	$20,000	$10,000	2.0000
3	Wakkanai Midori Challenge Cup; Hokkaido, Japan, Aug. 18–21	(Japan) Takumi Maeda	(Japan) Yusuke Morozumi	¥ 1,720,000	¥ 1,000,000	2.0000
4	Euro Super Series; Stirling, Scotland, Aug. 25–28	(Italy) Joël Retornaz	(United States) Korey Dropkin	£ 20,000	£ 6,000	5.5000
4	Curling Stadium Alberta Curling Series: Event 1 Leduc, Alberta, Aug. 26–28	(Alberta) Aaron Sluchinski	(Alberta) Karsten Sturmay	$6,500	$2,650	3.0000
5	Oslo Cup; Oslo, Norway, Sep. 2–4	(Sweden) Niklas Edin	(Norway) Steffen Walstad	NOK 112,000	$5,259	5.0000
5	Curling Stadium Martensville International; Martensville, Saskatchewan, Sep. 1–5	(Switzerland) Yannick Schwaller	(Japan) Riku Yanagisawa	$22,250	$10,000	4.5000
5	U25 NextGen Classic; Edmonton, Alberta, Aug. 30 – Sep. 3	(Ontario) Sam Mooibroek	(Nova Scotia) Owen Purcell	$16,000	$6,000	3.0000
6	Curling Stadium Alberta Curling Series Major; Leduc, Alberta, Sep. 9–12	(Switzerland) Yannick Schwaller	(Manitoba) Reid Carruthers	$27,000	$8,500	6.5000
6	ADVICS Cup; Kitami, Japan, Sep. 8–11	(Japan) Hayato Sato	(Japan) Shinya Abe	¥ 1,700,000	¥ 1,000,000	1.5000
7	ATB Okotoks Classic; Okotoks, Alberta, Sep. 15–18	(Alberta) Brendan Bottcher	(Alberta) Kevin Koe	$50,000	$14,000	7.0000
7	Mother Club Fall Curling Classic; Winnipeg, Manitoba, Sep. 15–18	(Manitoba) Ryan Wiebe	(Manitoba) Jordon McDonald	$7,600	$1,600	3.0000
7	Gord Carroll Curling Classic; Whitby, Ontario, Sep. 16–18	(United States) Luc Violette	(Ontario) Sam Mooibroek	$13,600	$3,250	2.5000
7	Curve US Open of Curling – Contender Round; Blaine, Minnesota, Sep. 15–18	Cancelled				
8	PointsBet Capital Winter Club Repechage; Fredericton, New Brunswick, Sep. 23–25	(Alberta) Karsten Sturmay	(New Brunswick) Scott Jones	$10,000	$5,000	3.0000
8	KW Fall Classic; Kitchener–Waterloo, Ontario, Sep. 22–25	(Ontario) Mike Fournier	(Ontario) Sam Steep	$9,750	$2,600	3.0000
8	Curve US Open of Curling – Championships; Blaine, Minnesota, Sep. 23–25	(United States) Korey Dropkin	(United States) Daniel Casper	$14,000 (US)	$2,000 (US)	2.5000
8	Capital Curling Fall Open; Ottawa, Ontario, Sep. 22–25	(Ontario) Jason Camm	(Ontario) Ted Butler	$10,400	$2,000	2.0000
8	Prairie Wheel Nutana SCT Spiel; Saskatoon, Saskatchewan, Sep. 23–25	(Saskatchewan) Kelly Knapp	(Saskatchewan) Michael Carss	$5,350	$1,400	2.0000
8	St. Vital U25 Bonspiel; Winnipeg, Manitoba, Sep. 22–25	Cancelled				
9	Stu Sells Toronto Tankard; Toronto, Ontario, Sep. 29 – Oct. 2	(Sweden) Niklas Edin	(Norway) Magnus Ramsfjell	$40,000	$10,000	5.5000
9	Prestige Hotels & Resorts Curling Classic; Vernon, British Columbia, Sep. 29 – Oct. 2	(Japan) Riku Yanagisawa	(Japan) Kohsuke Hirata	$18,000	$4,000	2.5000
9	Atkins Curling Supplies Classic; Winnipeg, Manitoba, Sep. 30 – Oct. 2	(Manitoba) Zachary Wasylik	(Manitoba) Corey Chambers	$8,000	$2,000	2.5000
9	Invitation Valleyfield; Valleyfield, Quebec, Sep. 29 – Oct. 2	(Quebec) Félix Asselin	(Quebec) Jean-Michel Ménard	$9,500	$2,450	2.0000
9	Rick Rowsell Classic; St. John's, Newfoundland and Labrador, Sep. 29 – Oct. 2	(Newfoundland and Labrador) Nathan Young	(Newfoundland and Labrador) Andrew Symonds	$16,000	$2,000	2.0000
9	Curling Stadium Alberta Curling Series; Leduc, Alberta, Sep. 30 – Oct. 2	(Saskatchewan) Kody Hartung	(Alberta) Scott Webb	$5,000	$2,000	2.0000
9	Alliston Curling Club Cash Spiel; Alliston, Ontario, Sep. 30 – Oct. 2	(Ontario) Carter Bryant	(Ontario) Cory Heggestad	$3,500	$1,000	0.5000
10	**BOOST National**; North Bay, Ontario, Oct. 4–9	(Newfoundland and Labrador) Brad Gushue	(Sweden) Niklas Edin	$150,000	$33,000	10.0000
10	S3 Group Curling Stadium Series; Swift Current, Saskatchewan, Oct. 7–10	(Saskatchewan) Steve Laycock	(Japan) Riku Yanagisawa	$9,000	$2,300	3.0000
10	McKee Homes Fall Curling Classic; Airdrie, Alberta, Oct. 7–10	(Alberta) Karsten Sturmay	(Alberta) Ryan Parent	$9,600	$3,200	3.0000
10	Capital Curling Classic; Ottawa, Ontario, Oct. 7–10	(Ontario) Jason Camm	(Quebec) Vincent Roberge	$15,000	$1,700	2.5000
10	Match Town Trophy; Jönköping, Sweden, Oct. 7–9	(Sweden) Fredrik Nyman	(Scotland) Cameron Bryce	SEK 48,000	$3,000	2.0000
10	Charleswood U25 Bonspiel; Winnipeg, Manitoba, Oct. 7–10	Cancelled				
11	Stroud Sleeman Cash Spiel; Stroud, Ontario, Oct. 14–16	(Switzerland) Yannick Schwaller	(Ontario) Pat Ferris	$11,200	$3,800	4.0000
11	Driving Force Decks Int'l Abbotsford Cashspiel; Abbotsford, British Columbia, Oct. 14–16	(Japan) Shinya Abe	(British Columbia) Brent Pierce	$19,200	$5,800	2.5000
11	New Scotland Brewing Mens Cash Spiel; Halifax, Nova Scotia, Oct. 14–16	(Nova Scotia) Owen Purcell	(Nova Scotia) Matthew Manuel	$7,500	$2,000	2.0000
11	Curling Stadium Contender Series; Blaine, Minnesota, Oct. 14–16	Cancelled				
12	**HearingLife Tour Challenge Tier 1** Grande Prairie, Alberta, Oct. 18–23	(Sweden) Niklas Edin	(Manitoba) Matt Dunstone	$120,000	$30,000	9.0000
12	**HearingLife Tour Challenge Tier 2** Grande Prairie, Alberta, Oct. 18–23	(United States) Korey Dropkin	(Alberta) Aaron Sluchinski	$50,000	$10,000	5.0000
12	St. Thomas Curling Classic; St. Thomas, Ontario, Oct. 21–23	(Ontario) John Willsey	(New Brunswick) James Grattan	$11,000	$3,000	2.5000
12	Curling Stadium Regina Highland SCT Spiel; Regina, Saskatchewan, Oct. 21–23	(Saskatchewan) Michael Carss	(Saskatchewan) Daymond Bernath	$8,415	$2,220	2.5000
12	Curling Stadium Alberta Curling Series: Event 3 Leduc, Alberta, Oct. 21–23	(Alberta) Daylan Vavrek	(Japan) Shinya Abe	$5,000	$2,000	1.5000
13	IG Wealth Management Western Showdown; Swift Current, Saskatchewan, Oct. 28–31	(Sweden) Oskar Eriksson	(Alberta) Kevin Koe	$36,000	$12,000	5.0000
13	Kamloops Crown of Curling; Kamloops, British Columbia, Oct. 28–30	(Japan) Hayato Sato	(British Columbia) Brent Pierce	$15,000	$5,000	2.0000
13	Challenge Nord-Ouest Air Creebec/Agnico Eagle; Val-d'Or, Quebec, Oct. 27–30	(Quebec) Steven Munroe	(Quebec) Jasmin Gibeau	$15,000	$3,100	2.0000
13	Sundbyberg Open; Sundbyberg, Sweden, Oct. 28–30	(Norway) Andreas Hårstad	(Sweden) Simon Granbom	SEK 29,000	$4,000	1.5000
13	Pomeroy Grande Prairie Cash Spiel (Note: Open to both genders.); Grande Prairie, Alberta, Oct. 28–30	(Alberta) Scott Webb	(Alberta) Krysta Hilker	$5,700	$2,000	1.0000
14	Nufloors Penticton Curling Classic; Penticton, British Columbia, Nov. 4–7	(United States) John Shuster	(Manitoba) Matt Dunstone	$100,000	$20,000	7.0000
14	Swiss Cup Basel; Basel, Switzerland, Nov. 4–6	(Scotland) Ross Whyte	(Norway) Magnus Ramsfjell	CHF 24,000	CHF 9,000	6.0000
14	Dave Jones Stanhope Simpson Insurance Mayflower Cashspiel; Halifax, Nova Scotia, Nov. 3–6	(Prince Edward Island) Adam Casey	(New Brunswick) James Grattan	$14,000	$4,700	2.0000
14	Bally Haly Cash Spiel; St. John's, Newfoundland and Labrador, Nov. 3–6	(Newfoundland and Labrador) Andrew Symonds	(Newfoundland and Labrador) Jeff Thomas	$10,080	$2,100	1.5000
14	Curling Stadium Alberta Curling Series: Event 4 Leduc, Alberta, Nov. 4–6	(Alberta) Jacob Libbus	(Alberta) Daylan Vavrek	$5,000	$2,000	1.5000
14	1000 Islands Gananoque Cash Spiel; Gananoque, Ontario, Nov. 4–6	Cancelled				
15	Original 16 Mens Cash Spiel; Calgary, Alberta, Nov. 11–13	(Scotland) Ross Whyte	(Alberta) Aaron Sluchinski	$24,000	$6,000	4.0000
15	Stu Sells 1824 Halifax Classic; Halifax, Nova Scotia, Nov. 9–13	(Ontario) John Epping	(Ontario) Jason Camm	$24,000	$7,500	3.5000
15	COMCO Cash Spiel; Stroud, Ontario, Nov. 11–13	(Ontario) Pat Ferris	(Ontario) Dayna Deruelle	$11,000	$2,400	2.5000
15	Curling Stadium Contender Series; Blaine, Minnesota, Nov. 11–13	(United States) John Shuster	(United States) Daniel Casper	$5,000 (US)	$2,658	2.0000
15	Twin Anchors Houseboats Classic; Salmon Arm, British Columbia, Nov. 11–13	Cancelled				
16	Prism Flow Red Deer Curling Classic; Red Deer, Alberta, Nov. 18–21	(Manitoba) Matt Dunstone	(Alberta) Kevin Koe	$35,000	$10,000	7.0000
16	Stu Sells Port Elgin Superspiel; Port Elgin, Ontario, Nov. 18–20	(Ontario) Alex Champ	(Newfoundland and Labrador) Greg Smith	$11,100	$3,000	3.0000
16	Mid-Canada Fasteners Classic; Winnipeg, Manitoba, Nov. 18–20	(Manitoba) Corey Chambers	(Manitoba) Ryan Wiebe	$2,800	$1,000	2.0000
16	Curling Stadium SaskTour Series; Martensville, Saskatchewan, Nov. 18–20	(Saskatchewan) Kelly Knapp	(Saskatchewan) Daymond Bernath	$5,255	$1,365	2.0000
16	Capital Curling Rideau Open; Ottawa, Ontario, Nov. 18–20	(Ontario) Howard Rajala	(Ontario) Mark Kean	$9,200	$2,000	2.0000
17	Challenge de Curling Desjardins; Clermont, Quebec, Nov. 24–27	(Ontario) John Epping	(Quebec) Félix Asselin	$27,000	$8,000	3.5000
17	50th Mile Zero Cash Spiel; Dawson Creek, British Columbia, Nov. 25–28	(Japan) Yusuke Morozumi	(Japan) Riku Yanagisawa	$40,000	$10,000	2.5000
17	Stu Sells Cookstown Classic; Cookstown, Ontario, Nov. 25–27	(Ontario) Alex Champ	(Ontario) Pat Ferris	$14,000	$3,000	2.0000
17	Jim Sullivan Curling Classic; Fredericton, New Brunswick, Nov. 24–27	(Nova Scotia) Stuart Thompson	(New Brunswick) Mike Kennedy	$15,300	$5,000	1.0000
18	DEKALB Superspiel; Morris, Manitoba, Dec. 2–5	(Manitoba) Matt Dunstone	(Manitoba) Reid Carruthers	$36,000	$11,000	4.5000
18	Stu Sells Brantford NISSAN Classic; Brantford, Ontario, Dec. 2–5	(Ontario) Pat Ferris	(Quebec) Félix Asselin	$15,000	$5,000	4.5000
18	King Cash Spiel; Maple Ridge, British Columbia, Dec. 2–4	(Japan) Riku Yanagisawa	(British Columbia) Brent Pierce	$11,400	$4,000	2.5000
18	Curling Stadium Alberta Curling Series; Leduc, Alberta, Dec. 2–4	(Alberta) Ryan Parent	(Alberta) Glen Hansen	$7,500	$3,000	2.0000
18	Scott Comfort RE/MAX Blue Chip Realty SCT; Wadena, Saskatchewan, Dec. 2–4	(Saskatchewan) Kelly Knapp	(Saskatchewan) Michael Carss	$8,025	$1,925	2.5000
19	**WFG Masters**; Oakville, Ontario, Dec. 6–11	(Italy) Joël Retornaz	(Scotland) Bruce Mouat	$150,000	$35,000	10.0000
19	Sask Curling Tour Moose Jaw; Moose Jaw, Saskatchewan, Dec. 9–11	(Sweden) Fredrik Nyman	(Saskatchewan) Scott Manners	$6,590	$1,720	2.5000
19	Superstore Monctonian Challenge; Moncton, New Brunswick, Dec. 9–11	(Prince Edward Island) Tyler Smith	(Nova Scotia) Stuart Thompson	$12,400	$2,000	2.0000
19	MCT Championships; Carberry, Manitoba, Dec. 9–11	(Manitoba) Steve Irwin	(Manitoba) Ryan Wiebe	$6,000	$1,600	2.0000
20	Curl Mesabi Classic; Eveleth, Minnesota, Dec. 16–18	(United States) Korey Dropkin	(United States) Daniel Casper	$21,000 (US)	$8,160	3.0000
20	Karuizawa International; Karuizawa, Japan, Dec. 16–18	(Japan) Riku Yanagisawa	(Japan) Yusuke Morozumi	¥ 1,500,000	¥ 800,000	2.5000
23	Mercure Perth Masters; Perth, Scotland, Jan. 4–7	(Scotland) Bruce Mouat	(Italy) Joël Retornaz	£ 17,000	£ 7,000	6.0000
24	**Co-op Canadian Open**; Camrose, Alberta, Jan. 10–15	(Alberta) Brendan Bottcher	(Sweden) Niklas Edin	$100,000	$35,000	10.0000
24	SCT Players Championship; Yorkton, Saskatchewan, Jan. 13–15	(Saskatchewan) Kelly Knapp	(Saskatchewan) Michael Carss	$12,600	$2,600	2.5000
25	Curling Stadium LA Open; Vernon, California, Jan. 19–22	Cancelled				
26	Ed Werenich Golden Wrench Classic; Tempe, Arizona, Jan. 26–29	(Alberta) Karsten Sturmay	(Manitoba) Reid Carruthers	$22,000 (US)	$7,968	3.5000
30	Sun City Cup; Karlstad, Sweden, Feb. 23–26	(Sweden) Niklas Edin	(Netherlands) Wouter Gösgens	SEK 55,000	$3,913	4.0000
31	Tournoi Hommes Circuit Provincial; Maniwaki, Quebec, Mar. 3–5	(Quebec) Mathieu Paquet	(Quebec) Yannick Martel	$10,000		1.0000
33	Aberdeen International Curling Championship; Aberdeen, Scotland, Mar. 24–26	(Scotland) Ross Whyte	(Italy) Joël Retornaz	£ 6,000	£ 2,500	5.0000
34	St. Catharines Golf & CC Cash Spiel; St. Catharines, Ontario, Mar. 24–26	(Ontario) Sam Mooibroek	(Turkey) Uğurcan Karagöz	$12,000	$2,800	2.5000
37	**Princess Auto Players' Championship**; Toronto, Ontario, Apr. 11–16	(Alberta) Kevin Koe	(Switzerland) Yannick Schwaller	$175,000	$40,000	10.0000
38	SGI Canada Best of the West; Saskatoon, Saskatchewan, Apr. 20–23	(Alberta) Karsten Sturmay	(Manitoba) Ryan Wiebe	$20,000	$10,000	3.0000
40	**KIOTI Tractor Champions Cup**; Olds, Alberta, May 2–7	(Alberta) Brendan Bottcher	(Newfoundland and Labrador) Brad Gushue	$150,000	$30,000	9.0000

==== Women's events ====
Week	Event	Winning skip	Runner-up skip	Purse (CAD)	Winner's share (CAD)	SFM
1	Hokkaido Bank Curling Classic; Sapporo, Japan, Aug. 4–7	(Japan) Sayaka Yoshimura	(Japan) Mayu Minami	¥ 1,700,000	¥ 1,000,000	2.5000
1	Morris Women's Summer SunSpiel; Morris, Manitoba, Aug. 5–7	Cancelled				
3	Euro Super Series; Stirling, Scotland, Aug. 18–21	(Germany) Daniela Jentsch	(Norway) Maia Ramsfjell	£ 20,000	£ 6,000	4.0000
3	Wakkanai Midori Challenge Cup; Hokkaido, Japan, Aug. 18–21	(Japan) Sayaka Yoshimura	(Japan) Asuka Kanai	¥ 1,720,000	¥ 1,000,000	2.5000
4	Summer Series; Saint-Félicien, Quebec, Aug. 26–29	(Switzerland) Silvana Tirinzoni	(British Columbia) Clancy Grandy	$14,000	$6,500	4.5000
4	Curling Stadium Alberta Curling Series: Event 1 Leduc, Alberta, Aug. 26–28	(South Korea) Gim Eun-ji	(Alberta) Selena Sturmay	$5,000	$2,000	3.5000
4	Curling Stadium Dumfries Ice Bowl Cup; Dumfries, Scotland, Aug. 24–27	Cancelled				
5	Curling Stadium Martensville International; Martensville, Saskatchewan, Sep. 1–5	(British Columbia) Clancy Grandy	(Switzerland) Silvana Tirinzoni	$25,000	$10,000	5.5000
5	Oslo Cup; Oslo, Norway, Sep. 2–4	(Sweden) Anna Hasselborg	(Manitoba) Kaitlyn Lawes	NOK 88,000	$5,259	5.0000
5	U25 NextGen Classic; Edmonton, Alberta, Aug. 31 – Sep. 3	(Alberta) Serena Gray-Withers	(Saskatchewan) Skylar Ackerman	$16,000	$6,000	2.5000
5	ARGO GRAPHICS Cup; Kitami, Japan, Sep. 1–4	(Japan) Sae Yamamoto	(Japan) Sayaka Yoshimura	¥ 1,700,000	¥ 1,000,000	2.0000
6	Saville Shoot-Out; Edmonton, Alberta, Sep. 9–11	(Manitoba) Jennifer Jones	(Ontario) Tracy Fleury	$24,000	$6,000	6.5000
6	ADVICS Cup; Kitami, Japan, Sep. 8–11	(Japan) Satsuki Fujisawa	(Japan) Sayaka Yoshimura	¥ 1,700,000	¥ 1,000,000	3.0000
6	Gord Carroll Curling Classic; Whitby, Ontario, Sep. 9–11	(Ontario) Isabelle Ladouceur	(Ontario) Lauren Mann	$13,600	$3,000	3.0000
7	Curling Stadium Alberta Curling Series Major; Leduc, Alberta, Sep. 15–18	(Japan) Ikue Kitazawa	(Switzerland) Selina Witschonke	$15,750	$5,500	4.5000
7	Mother Club Fall Curling Classic; Winnipeg, Manitoba, Sep. 15–18	(Manitoba) Kaitlyn Lawes	(United States) Sarah Anderson	$7,600	$1,800	3.5000
7	Curve US Open of Curling – Contender Round; Blaine, Minnesota, Sep. 15–18	Cancelled				
8	Curve US Open of Curling – Championships; Blaine, Minnesota, Sep. 23–25	(South Korea) Ha Seung-youn	(United States) Delaney Strouse	$14,000 (US)	$2,000 (US)	3.0000
8	KW Fall Classic; Kitchener–Waterloo, Ontario, Sep. 22–25	(Japan) Ikue Kitazawa	(Ontario) Carly Howard	$9,750	$2,600	3.0000
8	Sealcorp Nutana Women's Sask Curling Tour; Saskatoon, Saskatchewan, Sep. 23–25	(Saskatchewan) Lorraine Schneider	(Saskatchewan) Skylar Ackerman	$6,900	$1,800	3.0000
8	PointsBet Capital Winter Club Repechage; Fredericton, New Brunswick, Sep. 23–25	Cancelled				
8	St. Vital U25 Bonspiel; Winnipeg, Manitoba, Sep. 22–25	Cancelled				
9	Stu Sells Toronto Tankard; Toronto, Ontario, Sep. 29 – Oct. 2	(Switzerland) Silvana Tirinzoni	(Ontario) Isabelle Ladouceur	$20,000	$5,000	5.0000
9	Prestige Hotels & Resorts Curling Classic; Vernon, British Columbia, Sep. 29 – Oct. 2	(British Columbia) Corryn Brown	(Japan) Ikue Kitazawa	$31,500	$5,000	3.5000
9	Curling Stadium Alberta Curling Series; Leduc, Alberta, Sep. 30 – Oct. 2	(Alberta) Serena Gray-Withers	(Alberta) Gracelyn Richards	$6,250	$2,400	2.5000
9	Atkins Curling Supplies Classic; Winnipeg, Manitoba, Sep. 30 – Oct. 2	(Manitoba) Beth Peterson	(Manitoba) Abby Ackland	$5,000		
9	Rick Rowsell Classic; St. John's, Newfoundland and Labrador, Sep. 29 – Oct. 2	(Newfoundland and Labrador) Stacie Curtis	(Newfoundland and Labrador) Sarah Hill	$5,200	$3,400	
9	Alliston Curling Club Cash Spiel; Alliston, Ontario, Sep. 30 – Oct. 2	Cancelled				
10	**BOOST National**; North Bay, Ontario, Oct. 4–9	(Switzerland) Silvana Tirinzoni	(Manitoba) Kerri Einarson	$150,000	$33,000	10.0000
10	S3 Group Curling Stadium Series; Swift Current, Saskatchewan, Oct. 7–10	(Italy) Stefania Constantini	(South Korea) Ha Seung-youn	$9,200	$2,400	3.5000
10	Match Town Trophy; Jönköping, Sweden, Oct. 7–9	(Switzerland) Xenia Schwaller	(Norway) Eirin Mesloe	SEK 48,000	$3,000	3.0000
10	Charleswood U25 Bonspiel; Winnipeg, Manitoba, Oct. 7–10	Cancelled				
11	RBC Dominion Securities Western Showdown; Swift Current, Saskatchewan, Oct. 13–16	(Switzerland) Silvana Tirinzoni	(Manitoba) Abby Ackland	$45,000	$12,000	7.0000
11	Stroud Sleeman Cash Spiel; Stroud, Ontario, Oct. 14–16	(Ontario) Isabelle Ladouceur	(Ontario) Krysta Burns	$11,200	$3,800	3.5000
11	New Scotland Clothing Womens Cashspiel; Halifax, Nova Scotia, Oct. 14–16	(Nova Scotia) Christina Black	(Nova Scotia) Tanya Hilliard	$5,000	$2,000	2.5000
11	Driving Force Decks Int'l Abbotsford Cashspiel; Abbotsford, British Columbia, Oct. 14–16	(British Columbia) Kirsten Ryan	(Japan) Ikue Kitazawa	$10,800	$4,600	2.0000
11	Curling Stadium Contender Series; Blaine, Minnesota, Oct. 14–16	Cancelled				
12	**HearingLife Tour Challenge Tier 1** Grande Prairie, Alberta, Oct. 18–23	(Ontario) Tracy Fleury	(Manitoba) Kerri Einarson	$120,000	$30,000	9.0000
12	**HearingLife Tour Challenge Tier 2** Grande Prairie, Alberta, Oct. 18–23	(British Columbia) Clancy Grandy	(Alberta) Jessie Hunkin	$50,000	$10,000	5.0000
12	Curling Stadium Alberta Curling Series: Event 3 Leduc, Alberta, Oct. 21–23	(Scotland) Rebecca Morrison	(Switzerland) Michèle Jäggi	$8,900	$2,800	3.0000
13	Curlers Corner Autumn Gold Curling Classic; Calgary, Alberta, Oct. 28–31	(South Korea) Gim Eun-ji	(Switzerland) Michèle Jäggi	$44,000	$12,000	7.0000
13	Sundbyberg Open; Sundbyberg, Sweden, Oct. 28–30	(Sweden) Anna Hasselborg	(Sweden) Isabella Wranå	SEK 29,000	$4,000	4.0000
13	North Grenville Women's Fall Curling Classic; Kemptville, Ontario, Oct. 27–30	(Ontario) Isabelle Ladouceur	(Ontario) Danielle Inglis	$25,000	$6,500	4.0000
13	Superstore Lady Monctonian; Moncton, New Brunswick, Oct. 28–30	(Prince Edward Island) Suzanne Birt	(Nova Scotia) Sarah Murphy	$6,000	$2,000	3.0000
13	Kamloops Crown of Curling; Kamloops, British Columbia, Oct. 28–30	(British Columbia) Corryn Brown	(British Columbia) Diane Gushulak	$11,000	$3,000	2.0000
14	Curling Stadium Alberta Curling Series: Event 4 Leduc, Alberta, Nov. 4–6	(Alberta) Nicky Kaufman	(Japan) Ikue Kitazawa	$6,250	$2,400	2.5000
14	Dave Jones Stanhope Simpson Insurance Mayflower Cashspiel; Halifax, Nova Scotia, Nov. 3–6	(Nova Scotia) Sarah Murphy	(Nova Scotia) Taylour Stevens	$3,900	$1,950	
14	Bally Haly Cash Spiel; St. John's, Newfoundland and Labrador, Nov. 3–6	(Newfoundland and Labrador) Heather Strong	(Newfoundland and Labrador) Mackenzie Mitchell	$4,320		
15	Stu Sells 1824 Halifax Classic; Halifax, Nova Scotia, Nov. 9–13	(Manitoba) Selena Njegovan	(Nova Scotia) Christina Black	$24,000	$7,500	4.0000
15	Ladies Alberta Open; Okotoks, Alberta, Nov. 11–13	(Alberta) Kayla Skrlik	(Alberta) Casey Scheidegger	$6,000	$2,400	3.0000
15	Curling Stadium Contender Series; Blaine, Minnesota, Nov. 11–13	(United States) Madison Bear	(United States) Sarah Anderson	$5,000 (US)	$2,658	2.0000
15	Guelph Womens Superspiel; Guelph, Ontario, Nov. 11–13	(Ontario) Lauren Mann	(Ontario) Mackenzie Kiemele	$2,400	$1,000	2.0000
15	Twin Anchors Houseboats Classic; Salmon Arm, British Columbia, Nov. 11–13	Cancelled				
16	Prism Flow Red Deer Curling Classic; Red Deer, Alberta, Nov. 18–21	(Ontario) Tracy Fleury	(Alberta) Casey Scheidegger	$35,000	$10,000	7.0000
16	Tim Hortons Spitfire Arms Cash Spiel; Windsor, Nova Scotia, Nov. 18–20	(Nova Scotia) Christina Black	(Nova Scotia) Jennifer Crouse	$9,000	$3,000	2.5000
16	Mid-Canada Fasteners Classic; Winnipeg, Manitoba, Nov. 18–20	(Manitoba) Jennifer Clark-Rouire	(Manitoba) Jennifer Briscoe	$4,800		
17	Regina Highland SWCT Event; Regina, Saskatchewan, Nov. 25–27	(Saskatchewan) Penny Barker	(Saskatchewan) Sherry Anderson	$9,000	$3,000	3.5000
17	Home Again Curling Classic; Listowel, Ontario, Nov. 26–28	(Ontario) Chelsea Brandwood	(Ontario) Breanna Rozon	$11,200	$3,500	3.0000
17	Jim Sullivan Curling Classic; Fredericton, New Brunswick, Nov. 24–27	(Prince Edward Island) Marie Christianson	(New Brunswick) Andrea Kelly	$8,250	$2,000	2.0000
17	Boundary Ford Curling Classic; Lloydminster, Saskatchewan, Nov. 25–27	Cancelled				
17	Part II Bistro Ladies Classic; Wingham, Ontario, Nov. 25–27	Cancelled				
18	DEKALB Superspiel; Morris, Manitoba, Dec. 2–5	(Manitoba) Abby Ackland	(Saskatchewan) Nancy Martin	$24,000	$7,500	5.5000
18	Stu Sells Brantford NISSAN Classic; Brantford, Ontario, Dec. 2–5	(South Korea) Gim Eun-ji	(Ontario) Danielle Inglis	$15,000	$5,000	4.5000
18	Curling Stadium Alberta Curling Series; Leduc, Alberta, Dec. 2–4	(Japan) Sae Yamamoto	(Alberta) Michelle Hartwell	$10,000	$3,500	3.0000
18	King Cash Spiel; Maple Ridge, British Columbia, Dec. 2–4	(British Columbia) Stephanie Jackson-Baier	(British Columbia) Shawna Jensen	$5,700	$2,800	1.5000
19	**WFG Masters**; Oakville, Ontario, Dec. 6–11	(Manitoba) Kerri Einarson	(Ontario) Tracy Fleury	$150,000	$35,000	10.0000
19	Bogside Cup; Montague, Prince Edward Island, Dec. 9–11	(Nova Scotia) Christina Black	(Nova Scotia) Marlee Powers	$7,000	$2,600	2.5000
19	MCT Championships; Carberry, Manitoba, Dec. 9–11	(Manitoba) Lisa McLeod	(Manitoba) Alyssa Calvert	$6,000	$1,600	
19	Curling Stadium SaskTour Series; Swift Current, Saskatchewan, Dec. 9–11	Cancelled				
20	Karuizawa International; Karuizawa, Japan, Dec. 16–18	(South Korea) Kim Eun-jung	(Manitoba) Kerri Einarson	¥ 1,500,000	¥ 800,000	4.5000
20	Curl Mesabi Classic; Eveleth, Minnesota, Dec. 16–18	(United States) Tabitha Peterson	(Ontario) Krista McCarville	$20,000 (US)	$8,160	3.0000
23	Mercure Perth Masters; Perth, Scotland, Jan. 4–7	(Germany) Daniela Jentsch	(Norway) Marianne Rørvik	£ 7,200	£ 3,200	3.0000
24	**Co-op Canadian Open**; Camrose, Alberta, Jan. 10–15	(Japan) Satsuki Fujisawa	(Manitoba) Kerri Einarson	$150,000	$35,000	10.0000
24	SWCT Players Championship; Yorkton, Saskatchewan, Jan. 13–15	(Saskatchewan) Penny Barker	(Saskatchewan) Skylar Ackerman	$5,500	$2,000	3.0000
25	Curling Stadium LA Open; Vernon, California, Jan. 19–22	Cancelled				
30	Sun City Cup; Karlstad, Sweden, Feb. 23–26	(Norway) Marianne Rørvik	(Sweden) Anna Hasselborg	SEK 55,000	$3,913	4.0000
36	Boston Pizza Alberta Curling Tour Championship; Lacombe, Alberta, Apr. 7–10	Cancelled				
37	**Princess Auto Players' Championship**; Toronto, Ontario, Apr. 11–16	(Sweden) Isabella Wranå	(Switzerland) Silvana Tirinzoni	$175,000	$40,000	10.0000
38	SGI Canada Best of the West; Saskatoon, Saskatchewan, Apr. 20–23	(British Columbia) Corryn Brown	(Manitoba) Kelsey Rocque	$20,000	$10,000	3.0000
40	**KIOTI Tractor Champions Cup**; Olds, Alberta, May 2–7	(Ontario) Rachel Homan	(Manitoba) Kerri Einarson	$105,000	$30,000	9.0000
40	Obihiro ICE Gold Cup; Obihiro, Japan, May 3–7	Cancelled				

==== Mixed doubles events ====
Week	Event	Winning skip	Runner-up skip	Purse (CAD)	Winner's share (CAD)	SFM
3	Summer Series; Saint-Félicien, Quebec, Aug. 19–22	(Quebec) L. Cheal / G. Cheal	(Quebec) St-Georges / Asselin	$30,000	$5,000	5.5000
5	U25 NextGen Classic; Edmonton, Alberta, Sep. 3–5	(Ontario) Zheng / Pietrangelo	(Alberta) Papley / van Amsterdam	$10,000	$3,000	3.0000
6	GOLDLINE Boucherville Mixed Doubles; Boucherville, Quebec, Sep. 9–11	(Quebec) Jean / Wise	(Quebec) Sanscartier / Caron	$4,000	$800	4.0000
6	Mixed Doubles Mid-Week Kick-Off; Martensville, Saskatchewan, Sep. 6–8	(Saskatchewan) Just / Grindheim	(Saskatchewan) Hersikorn / Laycock	$2,000	$1,000	2.5000
7	Curling Stadium SaskTour Series; Martensville, Saskatchewan, Sep. 16–18	(Saskatchewan) Martin / Laycock	(Saskatchewan) J. Springer / G. Springer	$5,000	$1,000	2.5000
8	Curling Stadium Alberta Curling Series Doubles; Leduc, Alberta, Sep. 23–25	(Alberta) Walker / (Ontario) Muyres	(Japan) Matsumura / Tanida	$2,500	$1,000	3.0000
8	WCT Victoria Mixed Doubles Cashspiel; Victoria, British Columbia, Sep. 23–25	(British Columbia) Bowles / Middleton	(British Columbia) Wilson / Horvath	$3,500	$1,500	2.0000
9	Hardline Open; Carleton Place, Ontario, Sep. 29 – Oct. 2	(Scotland) Dodds / Mouat	(Alberta) Walker / (Ontario) Muyres	$33,000	$10,000	7.0000
9	Qualico Mixed Doubles Classic; Banff & Canmore, Alberta, Sep. 29 – Oct. 2	(Switzerland) Albrecht / (Manitoba) Wozniak	(Alberta) Peterman / Gallant	$30,000	$8,000	5.0000
9	Greater Toronto Mixed Doubles Curling Cup; Mississauga, Ontario, Oct. 1–2	(Ontario) Mallett / Jackson	(Ontario) Randell / Lemieux	$3,000	$1,000	2.0000
11	GOLDLINE Valleyfield Mixed Doubles; Valleyfield, Quebec, Oct. 14–16	(Ontario) Jones / Laing	(Quebec) St-Georges / Asselin	$4,000	$845	4.5000
11	Colorado Curling Cup; Lafayette, Colorado, Oct. 13–16	(United States) Farrell / Thurston	(United States) Strouse / Casper	$12,000 (US)	$3,000	3.0000
11	Norway Open Mixed Doubles; Hedmarken, Norway, Oct. 14–16	(Denmark) Jensen / Berger	(Norway) T. Aspeli / L. Aspeli	NOK 10,000	NOK 5,000	1.5000
11	Stu Sells Mixed Doubles Championship; Barrie, Ontario, Oct. 13–16	Cancelled				
12	Fredericton Mixed Doubles; Fredericton, New Brunswick, Oct. 21–23	(New Brunswick) Adams / Robichaud	(New Brunswick) Park / Forestell	$2,450	$600	2.0000
12	Nufloors Vernon MD Curling Classic; Vernon, British Columbia, Oct. 21–23	(British Columbia) Kyllo / Griffith	(British Columbia) Ja. Cotter / Jim Cotter	$6,000	$2,000	2.0000
13	Curling Stadium Alberta Curling Series Doubles; Leduc, Alberta, Oct. 28–30	Cancelled				
14	Aly Jenkins Mixed Doubles Memorial; Saskatoon, Saskatchewan, Nov. 3–6	(Saskatchewan) Martin / (British Columbia) Griffith	(Alberta) Walker / (Ontario) Muyres	$26,000	$7,000	6.0000
14	Palmerston Mixed Doubles Spiel; Palmerston, Ontario, Nov. 4–6	(Ontario) Sandham / Craig	(Ontario) Holyoke / Ryan	$4,000	$1,000	3.0000
14	GOLDLINE Clermont Mixed Doubles; Clermont, Quebec, Nov. 4–6	Cancelled				
15	Ilderton Mixed Doubles Spiel; Ilderton, Ontario, Nov. 12–13	(Ontario) Ca. Liscumb / Ch. Liscumb	(Ontario) K. Cottrill / S. Cottrill	$3,200	$1,000	2.0000
15	Nanaimo Double Doubles Spiel; Nanaimo, British Columbia, Nov. 11–13	(British Columbia) Reese-Hansen / Chester	(British Columbia) King-Simpson / Croteau	$5,000	$1,000	1.5000
16	Service Experts Shootout; Leduc, Alberta, Nov. 17–20	(Saskatchewan) Martin / (British Columbia) Griffith	(Manitoba) Einarson / (Ontario) Jacobs	$23,000	$7,000	7.0000
16	NexusBioAg Dauphin Mixed Doubles; Dauphin, Manitoba, Nov. 19–20	(Saskatchewan) Kitz / Stewart	(Manitoba) Sta. Irwin / Ste. Irwin	$3,500	$1,000	1.5000
16	GOLDLINE Sherbrooke Mixed Doubles; Sherbrooke, Quebec, Nov. 18–20	Cancelled				
17	Curling Stadium Alberta Curling Series Doubles; Leduc, Alberta, Nov. 25–27	(Alberta) Papley / van Amsterdam	(Alberta) Carey / (Ontario) Hodgson	$5,000	$1,750	2.5000
18	Winnipeg Open; Winnipeg, Manitoba, Dec. 1–4	(Alberta) Peterman / Gallant	(Saskatchewan) Kitz / Stewart	$25,000	$7,000	7.0000
18	Arborg Curling Club Mixed Doubles; Arborg, Manitoba, Dec. 3–4	Cancelled				
19	GOLDLINE Victoria Mixed Doubles; Quebec City, Quebec, Dec. 9–11	(South Korea) Kim / Jeong	(Quebec) É. Desjardins / R. Desjardins	$3,080	$840	3.5000
20	Eppic Ale Players' Championship; Brantford, Ontario, Dec. 16–18	(Estonia) Kaldvee / Lill	(Switzerland) Perret / Rios	$20,500	$7,500	7.0000
20	St. Thomas Mixed Doubles Classic; St. Thomas, Ontario, Dec. 16–18	(Quebec) St-Georges / Asselin	(Ontario) Neil / McDonald	$7,000	$1,800	3.0000
20	British Curling Mixed Doubles Super Series; Stirling, Scotland, Dec. 15–17	(Scotland) Duff / Lammie	(Scotland) Sinclair / Whyte	£ 5,600	$2,168	2.5000
20	Great Western Mixed Doubles Tour Challenge; Martensville, Saskatchewan, Dec. 16–18	(Saskatchewan) Hersikorn / Laycock	(Saskatchewan) Thevenot / Kalthoff	$5,500	$1,500	2.5000
20	Curling Stadium Alberta Curling Series Doubles; Leduc, Alberta, Dec. 16–18	(Ontario) Homan / (British Columbia) Tardi	(Alberta) Sturmay / Kleibrink	$3,750	$1,500	2.0000
22	Goldline Christmas Madness; Chicoutimi, Quebec, Dec. 27–29	(Quebec) Lafrance / Desjardins	(Quebec) Ouellet / Rousseau	$3,000	$320	1.5000
23	Walker Industries Mixed Doubles Spiel; Arthur, Ontario, Jan. 6–8	(Ontario) Neil / McDonald	(South Korea) Kim / Jeong	$5,600	$1,000	2.0000
24	Ontario Mixed Doubles Tour Championship; Wingham, Ontario, Jan. 13–15	(Ontario) Zheng / Pietrangelo	(Ontario) K. Tuck / W. Tuck	$5,200	$2,000	3.5000
26	Curling Stadium Alberta Curling Series Doubles; Leduc, Alberta, Jan. 27–29	Cancelled				
26	Heather Curling Club Mixed Doubles; Winnipeg, Manitoba, Jan. 28–29	Cancelled				
27	Stadler European Mixed Doubles Invitational; Biel, Switzerland, Feb. 3–5	(Norway) Mai. Ramsfjell / Mag. Ramsfjell	(Switzerland) Perret / Rios	CHF 5,600	$3,198	5.0000
27	Curling Stadium Junior Slam Series; Martensville, Saskatchewan, Feb. 3–5	Cancelled				
27	GOLDLINE Mixed Doubles Trois-Rivières; Trois-Rivières, Quebec, Feb. 3–5	(Quebec) St-Georges / Asselin	(New Brunswick) Adams / Robichaud	$4,000	$2,000	3.0000
27	PhysiGO Mobile Services East St. Paul Mixed Doubles; East St. Paul, Manitoba, Feb. 4–5	(Manitoba) M. Walter / B. Walter	(Manitoba) McKenzie / Dunlop	$3,500	$1,000	1.0000
29	GOLDLINE Mixed Doubles Rivière-du-Loup; Rivière-du-Loup, Quebec, Feb. 17–19	(New Brunswick) Adams / Robichaud	(Quebec) Cheal / Maurice	$4,000	$860	2.5000
32	GOLDLINE Tour Finals; Chicoutimi, Quebec, Mar. 10–12	(Quebec) Bouchard / Charest	(Quebec) Lafrance / Mullen	$6,000	$1,000	3.0000
36	Manitoba Mixed Doubles Tour Championship; Morris, Manitoba, Apr. 7–9	(Australia) Gill / Hewitt	(Nova Scotia) Powers / Saunders	$3,800	$1,000	2.0000

== WCF rankings ==
Men

After Week 40
#	Skip	YTD	OOM
1	(Newfoundland and Labrador) Brad Gushue	417.0	417.0
2	(Scotland) Bruce Mouat	366.3	366.3
3	(Sweden) Niklas Edin	365.0	365.0
4	(Alberta) Brendan Bottcher	362.0	362.0
5	(Italy) Joël Retornaz	351.8	351.8
6	(Manitoba) Matt Dunstone	341.0	341.0
7	(Switzerland) Yannick Schwaller	332.3	332.3
8	(Alberta) Kevin Koe	306.3	306.3
9	(Scotland) Ross Whyte	234.9	234.9
10	(United States) Korey Dropkin	234.4	234.4
11	(Norway) Magnus Ramsfjell	231.8	231.8
12	(Manitoba) Reid Carruthers	201.5	201.5
13	(United States) John Shuster	188.3	188.3
14	(Netherlands) Wouter Gösgens	184.5	184.5
15	(Norway) Steffen Walstad	181.3	181.3

Women

After Week 40
#	Skip	YTD	OOM
1	(Manitoba) Kerri Einarson	451.0	451.0
2	(Switzerland) Silvana Tirinzoni	415.0	415.0
3	(Ontario) Tracy Fleury	368.3	368.3
4	(Japan) Satsuki Fujisawa	327.3	327.3
5	(South Korea) Gim Eun-ji	309.6	309.6
6	(Manitoba) Jennifer Jones	288.0	288.0
7	(Sweden) Isabella Wranå	266.8	266.8
8	(Sweden) Anna Hasselborg	247.5	247.5
9	(United States) Tabitha Peterson	243.3	243.3
10	(Manitoba) Kaitlyn Lawes	225.5	225.5
11	(British Columbia) Clancy Grandy	217.9	217.9
12	(Alberta) Casey Scheidegger	194.8	194.8
13	(Norway) Marianne Rørvik	177.8	177.8
14	(Manitoba) Meghan Walter	177.3	177.3
15	(Switzerland) Raphaela Keiser	173.3	173.3

Mixed Doubles

After Week 40
#	Team	YTD	OOM
1	(Ontario) Jones / Laing	218.1	218.1
2	(Switzerland) Perret / Rios	184.8	184.8
3	(Estonia) Kaldvee / Lill	179.9	179.9
4	(Scotland) Dodds / Mouat	174.5	174.5
5	(Alberta) Walker / (Saskatchewan) Muyres	167.0	167.0
6	(Saskatchewan) Martin / (British Columbia) Griffith	160.1	160.1
7	(United States) Thiesse / Dropkin	159.8	159.8
8	(Japan) Matsumura / Tanida	158.0	158.0
9	(Saskatchewan) Kitz / Stewart	155.2	155.2
10	(Norway) Rønning / Brænden	147.8	147.8
11	(Alberta) Peterman / Gallant	135.0	135.0
12	(Denmark) Lander / Holtermann	124.0	124.0
13	(Quebec) St-Georges / Asselin	122.5	122.5
14	(Ontario) Weagle / Epping	122.4	122.4
15	(Sweden) Westman / Ahlberg	119.8	119.8

== Notes ==
Preceded by 2021–22	2022–23 curling season June 2022 – May 2023	Succeeded by 2023–24
