= 2022 Alberta Curling Series: Event 4 =

Curling event in Canada

2022 Curling Stadium Alberta Curling Series: Event 4
- Host city: Leduc, Alberta
- Arena: Leduc Recreation Centre
- Dates: November 4–6
- Men's winner: (Alberta) Team Libbus
- Curling club: Okotoks CC, Okotoks
- Skip: Jacob Libbus
- Third: Nathan Molberg
- Second: Steven Leong
- Lead: Michael Henricks
- Alternate: Tyler Gritten
- Finalist: (Alberta) Daylan Vavrek
- Women's winner: (Alberta) Team Kaufman
- Curling club: Crestwood CC, Edmonton
- Skip: Nicky Kaufman
- Third: Jennifer Van Wieren
- Second: Megan Anderson
- Lead: Holly Baird
- Alternate: Pam Appelman
- Finalist: (Japan) Ikue Kitazawa

The fourth event of the 2022 Curling Stadium Alberta Curling Series was held from November 4 to 6 at the Leduc Recreation Centre in Leduc, Alberta. It was the fourth of five men's and women's events held as part of the Alberta Curling Series for the 2022–23 curling season. The total purse for the event was $5,000 on the men's side and $6,250 on the women's side.

The event was sponsored by Curling Stadium, a streaming service provided by CurlingZone. All of the games were streamed on CurlingZone and the Alberta Curling Series' YouTube page.

== Men ==
=== Teams ===
The teams are listed as follows:

Skip	Third	Second	Lead	Alternate	Locale
Giacomo Colli	Alberto Zisa	Francesco De Zanna	Edoardo Alfonsi		Cortina d'Ampezzo, Italy
Brandt Holt	Joel MacDonald	Lane Missel	Jordon Geiger	Gryffen Algot	Sherwood Park, Alberta
Jacob Libbus	Nathan Molberg	Steven Leong	Michael Henricks	Tyler Gritten	Okotoks, Alberta
Jaedon Miller	James Owens	Jared Day	Riley Lloyd		Saskatoon, Saskatchewan
Cody Sutherland	James Hom	Cole Macknak	Landon Field		North Battleford, Saskatchewan
Johnson Tao	Jaedon Neuert	Benjamin Morin	Adam Naugler		Edmonton, Alberta
Daylan Vavrek	Roland Robinson	Tyler Lautner	Evan Asmussen	Carter Lautner	Calgary, Alberta
Matt Yeo					Leduc, Alberta

=== Round robin standings ===
Final Round Robin Standings

Key
Teams to Playoffs

Pool A	W	L	PF	PA	DSC
(Italy) Giocomo Colli	3	0	22	8	100.00
(Alberta) Johnson Tao	2	1	15	16	78.00
(Saskatchewan) Cody Sutherland	1	2	15	19	396.50
(Saskatchewan) Jaedon Miller	0	3	10	19	345.00

Pool B	W	L	PF	PA	DSC
(Alberta) Daylan Vavrek	3	0	19	1	117.00
(Alberta) Jacob Libbus	2	1	11	12	306.25
(Alberta) Brandt Holt	1	2	9	17	208.00
(Alberta) Matt Yeo	0	3	9	18	262.00

=== Round robin results ===
All draw times are listed in Mountain Time (UTC−06:00).

==== Draw 1 ====
Friday, November 4, 4:00 pm

Sheet 3	1	2	3	4	5	6	7	8	Final
(Saskatchewan) Jaedon Miller	0	0	0	2	0	0	0	X	2
(Italy) Giocomo Colli	2	0	0	0	3	1	1	X	7

Sheet 4	1	2	3	4	5	6	7	8	Final
(Alberta) Daylan Vavrek	2	0	1	1	1	2	X	X	7
(Alberta) Brandt Holt	0	0	0	0	0	0	X	X	0

Sheet 5	1	2	3	4	5	6	7	8	Final
(Alberta) Johnson Tao	2	0	3	0	0	0	2	X	7
(Saskatchewan) Cody Sutherland	0	2	0	1	0	2	0	X	5

Sheet 6	1	2	3	4	5	6	7	8	Final
(Alberta) Jacob Libbus	1	0	0	0	1	0	3	0	5
(Alberta) Matt Yeo	0	2	0	0	0	1	0	1	4

==== Draw 3 ====
Saturday, November 5, 10:00 am

Sheet 1	1	2	3	4	5	6	7	8	Final
(Saskatchewan) Jaedon Miller	0	0	3	0	0	0	1	X	4
(Saskatchewan) Cody Sutherland	1	1	0	1	1	3	0	X	7

Sheet 2	1	2	3	4	5	6	7	8	Final
(Alberta) Johnson Tao	0	1	1	0	1	0	0	0	3
(Italy) Giocomo Colli	0	0	0	1	0	3	1	2	7

Sheet 7	1	2	3	4	5	6	7	8	Final
(Alberta) Jacob Libbus	0	1	0	0	1	1	1	1	5
(Alberta) Brandt Holt	1	0	1	1	0	0	0	0	3

Sheet 8	1	2	3	4	5	6	7	8	Final
(Alberta) Daylan Vavrek	2	1	1	3	X	X	X	X	7
(Alberta) Matt Yeo	0	0	0	0	X	X	X	X	0

==== Draw 4 ====
Saturday, November 5, 4:00 pm

Sheet 3	1	2	3	4	5	6	7	8	Final
(Alberta) Daylan Vavrek	0	0	0	0	1	2	2	X	5
(Alberta) Jacob Libbus	0	0	1	0	0	0	0	X	1

Sheet 5	1	2	3	4	5	6	7	8	Final
(Alberta) Matt Yeo	1	0	0	2	0	0	2	0	5
(Alberta) Brandt Holt	0	0	3	0	0	2	0	1	6

Sheet 7	1	2	3	4	5	6	7	8	Final
(Italy) Giocomo Colli	0	1	0	2	0	3	2	X	8
(Saskatchewan) Cody Sutherland	0	0	2	0	1	0	0	X	3

Sheet 8	1	2	3	4	5	6	7	8	Final
(Alberta) Johnson Tao	0	0	0	2	0	2	0	1	5
(Saskatchewan) Jaedon Miller	0	0	2	0	2	0	0	0	4

=== Playoffs ===
Semifinals
1	(Italy) Giocomo Colli	3
4	(Alberta) Jacob Libbus	10
2	(Alberta) Daylan Vavrek	5
3	(Alberta) Johnson Tao	4

Final
4	(Alberta) Jacob Libbus	7
2	(Alberta) Daylan Vavrek	6

==== Semifinals ====
Sunday, November 6, 12:00 pm

Sheet 3	1	2	3	4	5	6	7	8	Final
(Italy) Giocomo Colli	0	0	2	0	1	0	0	X	3
(Alberta) Jacob Libbus	0	1	0	2	0	2	5	X	10

Sheet 4	1	2	3	4	5	6	7	8	9	Final
(Alberta) Daylan Vavrek	0	0	2	0	1	0	0	1	1	5
(Alberta) Johnson Tao	0	1	0	2	0	1	0	0	0	4

==== Final ====
Sunday, November 6, 3:00 pm

Sheet 5	1	2	3	4	5	6	7	8	9	Final
(Alberta) Jacob Libbus	0	0	0	2	0	1	0	3	1	7
(Alberta) Daylan Vavrek	0	2	0	0	2	0	2	0	0	6

== Women ==
=== Teams ===
The teams are listed as follows:

Skip	Third	Second	Lead	Alternate	Locale
Skylar Ackerman	Kya Kennedy	Taylor Stremick	Kaylin Skinner		Saskatoon, Saskatchewan
Claire Booth	Kaylee Raniseth	Raelyn Helston	Lauren Miller		Calgary, Alberta
Shiella Cowan	Sandra Comadina	Stephanie Whittaker-Kask	Christine Matthews		New Westminster, British Columbia
Michelle Hartwell	Jessica Monk	Erica Wiese	Ashley Kalk	Sharla Warwa	Edmonton, Alberta
Krysta Hilker	Kim Curtin	Karryn Flory (Note: Karryn Flory spared for Sydney Steinke.)	Claire Murray		Edmonton, Alberta
Nicky Kaufman	Jennifer Van Wieren	Megan Anderson	Holly Baird	Pam Appelman	Edmonton, Alberta
Ikue Kitazawa	Seina Nakajima	Minori Suzuki	Hasumi Ishigooka	Chiaki Matsumura	Nagano, Japan
Adele Purcell	Deanne Nichol	Meghan Chateauvert	Heather Steele		St. Albert, Alberta
Kim Rhyme	Libby Brundage	Cait Flannery	Katie Rhyme		(United States) Saint Paul, Minnesota
Gracelyn Richards	Rachel Jacques	Amy Wheatcroft	Anna Munroe		Edmonton, Alberta

=== Round robin standings ===
Final Round Robin Standings

Key
Teams to Playoffs
Teams to Tiebreaker

Pool A	W	L	PF	PA	DSC
(Japan) Ikue Kitazawa	4	0	33	7	161.00
(Alberta) Nicky Kaufman	3	1	23	12	402.00
(Alberta) Claire Booth	2	2	13	26	111.00
(Alberta) Michelle Hartwell	1	3	15	25	226.00
(Alberta) Adele Purcell	0	4	11	25	224.50

Pool B	W	L	PF	PA	DSC
(Alberta) Gracelyn Richards	3	1	17	19	351.00
(United States) Kim Rhyme	2	2	20	16	117.50
(Alberta) Krysta Hilker	2	2	20	20	146.50
(Saskatchewan) Skylar Ackerman	2	2	20	20	419.50
(British Columbia) Shiella Cowan	1	3	16	18	149.00

=== Round robin results ===
All draw times are listed in Mountain Time (UTC−06:00).

==== Draw 1 ====
Friday, November 4, 4:00 pm

Sheet 1	1	2	3	4	5	6	7	8	Final
(Alberta) Nicky Kaufman	0	0	1	1	1	2	X	X	5
(Alberta) Claire Booth	0	0	0	0	0	0	X	X	0

Sheet 2	1	2	3	4	5	6	7	8	Final
(Alberta) Adele Purcell	0	0	1	0	0	X	X	X	1
(Alberta) Michelle Hartwell	1	3	0	2	1	X	X	X	7

Sheet 7	1	2	3	4	5	6	7	8	Final
(British Columbia) Shiella Cowan	2	0	2	1	0	1	0	X	6
(United States) Kim Rhyme	0	2	0	0	1	0	1	X	4

Sheet 8	1	2	3	4	5	6	7	8	Final
(Alberta) Krysta Hilker	0	0	1	0	2	2	1	0	6
(Alberta) Gracelyn Richards	1	1	0	2	0	0	0	3	7

==== Draw 2 ====
Friday, November 4, 7:30 pm

Sheet 5	1	2	3	4	5	6	7	8	Final
(Saskatchewan) Skylar Ackerman	0	0	1	2	0	1	0	1	5
(United States) Kim Rhyme	0	1	0	0	0	0	3	0	4

Sheet 6	1	2	3	4	5	6	7	8	Final
(Alberta) Krysta Hilker	0	0	2	0	1	0	0	1	4
(British Columbia) Shiella Cowan	0	2	0	0	0	1	0	0	3

Sheet 7	1	2	3	4	5	6	7	8	9	Final
(Alberta) Adele Purcell	1	0	1	0	0	0	0	2	0	4
(Alberta) Nicky Kaufman	0	1	0	0	1	1	1	0	1	5

Sheet 8	1	2	3	4	5	6	7	8	Final
(Japan) Ikue Kitazawa	1	3	2	5	X	X	X	X	11
(Alberta) Claire Booth	0	0	0	0	X	X	X	X	0

==== Draw 3 ====
Saturday, November 5, 10:00 am

Sheet 3	1	2	3	4	5	6	7	8	9	Final
(Saskatchewan) Skylar Ackerman	0	2	0	1	0	1	0	1	1	6
(British Columbia) Shiella Cowan	1	0	2	0	1	0	1	0	0	5

Sheet 4	1	2	3	4	5	6	7	8	Final
(Alberta) Gracelyn Richards	0	0	1	0	0	0	X	X	1
(United States) Kim Rhyme	1	1	0	2	2	1	X	X	7

Sheet 5	1	2	3	4	5	6	7	8	Final
(Japan) Ikue Kitazawa	2	0	1	3	0	1	0	X	7
(Alberta) Nicky Kaufman	0	2	0	0	2	0	0	X	4

Sheet 6	1	2	3	4	5	6	7	8	Final
(Alberta) Claire Booth	0	0	0	0	2	0	2	3	7
(Alberta) Michelle Hartwell	0	1	1	1	0	2	0	0	5

==== Draw 4 ====
Saturday, November 5, 4:00 pm

Sheet 1	1	2	3	4	5	6	7	8	Final
(British Columbia) Shiella Cowan	0	0	1	0	1	0	0	0	2
(Alberta) Gracelyn Richards	0	0	0	2	0	1	0	1	4

Sheet 2	1	2	3	4	5	6	7	8	Final
(Saskatchewan) Skylar Ackerman	0	0	0	0	2	0	3	0	5
(Alberta) Krysta Hilker	1	1	0	1	0	1	0	2	6

Sheet 4	1	2	3	4	5	6	7	8	Final
(Alberta) Nicky Kaufman	1	1	0	5	2	X	X	X	9
(Alberta) Michelle Hartwell	0	0	1	0	0	X	X	X	1

Sheet 6	1	2	3	4	5	6	7	8	Final
(Japan) Ikue Kitazawa	0	0	2	2	3	X	X	X	7
(Alberta) Adele Purcell	0	1	0	0	0	X	X	X	1

==== Draw 5 ====
Saturday, November 5, 7:30 pm

Sheet 3	1	2	3	4	5	6	7	8	Final
(Alberta) Krysta Hilker	0	1	0	1	0	2	0	0	4
(United States) Kim Rhyme	0	0	2	0	2	0	1	0	5

Sheet 4	1	2	3	4	5	6	7	8	Final
(Alberta) Adele Purcell	0	1	1	0	0	1	2	0	5
(Alberta) Claire Booth	1	0	0	2	1	0	0	2	6

Sheet 6	1	2	3	4	5	6	7	8	Final
(Saskatchewan) Skylar Ackerman	0	1	0	0	2	0	0	1	4
(Alberta) Gracelyn Richards	1	0	2	0	0	2	0	0	5

Sheet 7	1	2	3	4	5	6	7	8	Final
(Japan) Ikue Kitazawa	1	1	0	0	3	3	X	X	8
(Alberta) Michelle Hartwell	0	0	1	1	0	0	X	X	2

=== Tiebreaker ===
Sunday, November 6, 9:00 am

Sheet 7	1	2	3	4	5	6	7	8	Final
(Alberta) Claire Booth	0	0	0	2	0	0	X	X	2
(United States) Kim Rhyme	1	2	1	0	3	3	X	X	10

=== Playoffs ===
Semifinals
1	(Japan) Ikue Kitazawa	8
4	(United States) Kim Rhyme	5
2	(Alberta) Gracelyn Richards	5
3	(Alberta) Nicky Kaufman	7

Final
1	(Japan) Ikue Kitazawa	5
3	(Alberta) Nicky Kaufman	6

==== Semifinals ====
Sunday, November 6, 12:00 pm

Sheet 5	1	2	3	4	5	6	7	8	Final
(Japan) Ikue Kitazawa	2	0	2	0	3	1	0	X	8
(United States) Kim Rhyme	0	2	0	2	0	0	1	X	5

Sheet 6	1	2	3	4	5	6	7	8	Final
(Alberta) Gracelyn Richards	2	0	1	0	0	2	0	0	5
(Alberta) Nicky Kaufman	0	1	0	2	3	0	0	1	7

==== Final ====
Sunday, November 6, 3:00 pm

Sheet 4	1	2	3	4	5	6	7	8	Final
(Japan) Ikue Kitazawa	0	1	1	0	0	1	0	2	5
(Alberta) Nicky Kaufman	0	0	0	2	1	0	3	0	6
