= 2022 Alberta Curling Series: Event 3 =

Curling event in Canada

2022 Curling Stadium Alberta Curling Series: Event 3
- Host city: Leduc, Alberta
- Arena: Leduc Recreation Centre
- Dates: October 21–23
- Men's winner: (Alberta) Team Vavrek
- Curling club: Calgary CC, Calgary
- Skip: Daylan Vavrek
- Third: Roland Robinson
- Second: Tyler Lautner
- Lead: Evan Asmussen
- Finalist: (Japan) Shinya Abe
- Women's winner: (Scotland) Team Morrison
- Curling club: National CA, Stirling
- Skip: Rebecca Morrison
- Third: Gina Aitken
- Second: Sophie Sinclair
- Lead: Sophie Jackson
- Finalist: (Switzerland) Michèle Jäggi

The third event of the 2022 Curling Stadium Alberta Curling Series was held from October 21 to 23 at the Leduc Recreation Centre in Leduc, Alberta. It was the third of five men's and women's events held as part of the Alberta Curling Series for the 2022–23 curling season. The total purse for the event was $5,000 on the men's side and $8,900 on the women's side.

The event was sponsored by Curling Stadium, a streaming service provided by CurlingZone. All of the games were streamed on CurlingZone and the Alberta Curling Series' YouTube page.

== Men ==
=== Teams ===
The teams are listed as follows:

Skip	Third	Second	Lead	Alternate	Locale
Tetsuro Shimizu (Fourth)	Haruto Ouchi	Shinya Abe (Skip)	Minori Suzuki	Sota Tsuruga	Sapporo, Japan
Cole Adams	Riley Helston	Benjamin Helston	Braden Pelech		Calgary, Alberta
Owen Fenske (Fourth)	Beau Cornelson (Skip)	Hunter Reese	Nathan Kelba		Camrose, Alberta
Brandt Holt	Joel MacDonald	Lane Missel	Jordon Geiger		Sherwood Park, Alberta
Anton Hood	Ben Smith	Brett Sargon	Hunter Walker	Peter de Boer	Naseby, New Zealand
Jeong Yeong-seok	Park Jong-duk	Oh Seung-hoon	Seong Ji-hoon		Gangwon, South Korea
Ryan Parent	Zachary Pawliuk	Tyler Powell	John Ritchie		Calgary, Alberta
Daylan Vavrek	Roland Robinson	Tyler Lautner	Evan Asmussen		Calgary, Alberta

=== Round-robin standings ===
Final round-robin standings

Key
Teams to Playoffs
Teams to Tiebreaker

Pool A	W	L	PF	PA	DSC
(Alberta) Daylan Vavrek	3	0	21	10	179.5
(South Korea) Jeong Yeong-seok	2	1	19	6	126.5
(Alberta) Ryan Parent	1	2	12	14	115.0
(Alberta) Beau Cornelson	0	3	5	27	400.5

Pool B	W	L	PF	PA	DSC
(Japan) Shinya Abe	2	1	25	10	92.0
(Alberta) Cole Adams	2	1	17	15	96.0
(New Zealand) Anton Hood	2	1	19	15	177.0
(Alberta) Brandt Holt	0	3	4	25	469.0

=== Round-robin results ===
All draw times are listed in Mountain Time (UTC−06:00).

==== Draw 2 ====
Friday, October 21, 7:00 pm

Sheet 3	1	2	3	4	5	6	7	8	Final
(Alberta) Daylan Vavrek	1	1	0	2	1	0	1	X	6
(Alberta) Ryan Parent	0	0	1	0	0	2	0	X	3

Sheet 4	1	2	3	4	5	6	7	8	Final
(South Korea) Jeong Yeong-seok	2	3	3	1	X	X	X	X	9
(Alberta) Beau Cornelson	0	0	0	0	X	X	X	X	0

Sheet 5	1	2	3	4	5	6	7	8	Final
(Japan) Shinya Abe	0	0	2	1	0	0	1	2	6
(New Zealand) Anton Hood	3	2	0	0	1	1	0	0	7

Sheet 6	1	2	3	4	5	6	7	8	Final
(Alberta) Cole Adams	0	4	1	1	0	2	X	X	8
(Alberta) Brandt Holt	0	0	0	0	1	0	X	X	1

==== Draw 4 ====
Saturday, October 22, 9:00 am

Sheet 3	1	2	3	4	5	6	7	8	Final
(Alberta) Cole Adams	3	0	0	1	0	0	0	3	7
(New Zealand) Anton Hood	0	1	1	0	2	1	0	0	5

Sheet 4	1	2	3	4	5	6	7	8	Final
(Japan) Shinya Abe	2	2	0	2	1	3	X	X	10
(Alberta) Brandt Holt	0	0	1	0	0	0	X	X	1

Sheet 7	1	2	3	4	5	6	7	8	Final
(South Korea) Jeong Yeong-seok	0	0	0	1	2	0	0	0	3
(Alberta) Daylan Vavrek	0	2	1	0	0	1	0	1	5

Sheet 8	1	2	3	4	5	6	7	8	Final
(Alberta) Ryan Parent	1	0	3	1	2	1	X	X	8
(Alberta) Beau Cornelson	0	1	0	0	0	0	X	X	1

==== Draw 7 ====
Saturday, October 22, 7:00 pm

Sheet 1	1	2	3	4	5	6	7	8	Final
(Alberta) Daylan Vavrek	0	5	0	2	0	3	X	X	10
(Alberta) Beau Cornelson	1	0	2	0	1	0	X	X	4

Sheet 2	1	2	3	4	5	6	7	8	Final
(Alberta) Brandt Holt	0	2	0	0	0	0	X	X	2
(New Zealand) Anton Hood	2	0	2	0	2	1	X	X	7

Sheet 4	1	2	3	4	5	6	7	8	Final
(South Korea) Jeong Yeong-seok	2	3	0	1	1	X	X	X	7
(Alberta) Ryan Parent	0	0	1	0	0	X	X	X	2

Sheet 5	1	2	3	4	5	6	7	8	Final
(Japan) Shinya Abe	0	3	0	2	4	X	X	X	9
(Alberta) Cole Adams	0	0	2	0	0	X	X	X	2

=== Tiebreaker ===
Sunday, October 23, 9:00 am

Sheet 8	1	2	3	4	5	6	7	8	9	Final
(New Zealand) Anton Hood	0	0	0	1	0	0	0	0	1	2
(South Korea) Jeong Yeong-seok	0	0	0	0	0	0	0	1	0	1

=== Playoffs ===
Semifinals
1	(Alberta) Daylan Vavrek	6
4	(New Zealand) Anton Hood	3
2	(Japan) Shinya Abe	8
3	(Alberta) Cole Adams	1

Final
1	(Alberta) Daylan Vavrek	6
2	(Japan) Shinya Abe	4

==== Semifinals ====
Sunday, October 23, 12:00 pm

Sheet 3	1	2	3	4	5	6	7	8	Final
(Alberta) Daylan Vavrek	1	1	0	2	0	2	0	X	6
(New Zealand) Anton Hood	0	0	1	0	2	0	0	X	3

Sheet 8	1	2	3	4	5	6	7	8	Final
(Japan) Shinya Abe	1	1	3	0	3	X	X	X	8
(Alberta) Cole Adams	0	0	0	1	0	X	X	X	1

==== Final ====
Sunday, October 23, 3:00 pm

Sheet 5	1	2	3	4	5	6	7	8	Final
(Alberta) Daylan Vavrek	0	2	0	0	1	0	0	3	6
(Japan) Shinya Abe	0	0	1	0	0	2	1	0	4

== Women ==
=== Teams ===
The teams are listed as follows:

Skip	Third	Second	Lead	Alternate	Locale
Trina Ball	Candace Reed	Deborah Hawkshaw	Sarah Mazoleski		Edmonton, Alberta
Emily Clark	Emily Deibert	Rachel Clark	Leslie Hammond		Westlock, Alberta
Ha Seung-youn	Kim Hye-rin	Yang Tae-i	Kim Su-jin		Chuncheon, South Korea
Michelle Hartwell	Jessica Monk	Erica Wiese	Ashley Kalk		Edmonton, Alberta
Michèle Jäggi	Irene Schori	Stefanie Berset	Sarah Müller	Lara Stocker	Bern, Switzerland
Nicky Kaufman	Jennifer Van Wieren	Megan Anderson	Holly Baird	Pam Appelman	Edmonton, Alberta
Rebecca Morrison	Gina Aitken	Sophie Sinclair	Sophie Jackson		Stirling, Scotland
Lisa Parent	Sophie Brissette	Kaitlin Zeller	Megan Johnson		Calgary, Alberta
Adele Purcell	Deanne Nichol	Meghan Chateauvert	Heather Steele		St. Albert, Alberta
Deb Santos	Lorna Alfrey	Lil Grabinsky	Pauline Erickson	Sandy Tougas	Edmonton, Alberta
Marla Sherrer	Chantele Broderson	Julie Selvais	Sarah Drummond		Lacombe, Alberta
Kellie Stiksma	Nicole Larson	Jamie Scott	Bailey Horte		Edmonton, Alberta
Jennifer Westhagen	Sara Westman	Kristen Tsourlenes	Carlee Millikin	Nicole Hewett	Australia
Jessica Wytrychowski	Jessica Koch	Emily Neufeld	Cheryl Damen		Calgary, Alberta

=== Round-robin standings ===
Final round-robin standings

Key
Teams to Playoffs

Pool A	W	L	PF	PA	DSC
(Switzerland) Michèle Jäggi	3	1	29	12	88.5
(Alberta) Nicky Kaufman	2	2	19	23	271.5
(Alberta) Jessica Wytrychowski	2	2	25	21	311.5
(Alberta) Emily Clark	2	2	25	27	451.5
(Alberta) Trina Ball	1	3	13	28	306.5

Pool B	W	L	PF	PA	DSC
(Alberta) Michelle Hartwell	4	0	28	19	400.0
(South Korea) Ha Seung-youn	3	1	35	12	171.0
(Alberta) Marla Sherrer	2	2	19	23	126.5
(Alberta) Kellie Stiksma	1	3	14	24	276.0
(Australia) Jennifer Westhagen	0	4	11	29	525.0

Pool C	W	L	PF	PA	DSC
(Scotland) Rebecca Morrison	4	0	24	7	149.5
(Alberta) Lisa Parent	2	2	21	23	360.0
(Alberta) Deb Santos	2	2	19	22	462.0
(Alberta) Adele Purcell	0	4	12	24	251.0

=== Round-robin results ===
All draw times are listed in Mountain Time (UTC−06:00).

==== Draw 1 ====
Friday, October 21, 4:00 pm

Sheet 3	1	2	3	4	5	6	7	8	Final
(Switzerland) Michèle Jäggi	0	1	0	1	3	3	X	X	8
(Alberta) Emily Clark	1	0	2	0	0	0	X	X	3

Sheet 4	1	2	3	4	5	6	7	8	9	Final
(Alberta) Jessica Wytrychowski	0	2	1	0	1	0	0	1	0	5
(Alberta) Nicky Kaufman	1	0	0	2	0	1	1	0	1	6

Sheet 5	1	2	3	4	5	6	7	8	Final
(South Korea) Ha Seung-youn	0	0	2	1	1	0	2	0	6
(Alberta) Michelle Hartwell	0	2	0	0	0	3	0	2	7

Sheet 6	1	2	3	4	5	6	7	8	Final
(Alberta) Marla Sherrer	2	1	1	0	0	1	0	1	6
(Alberta) Kellie Stiksma	0	0	0	2	0	0	1	0	3

Sheet 7	1	2	3	4	5	6	7	8	Final
(Scotland) Rebecca Morrison	1	1	1	2	2	X	X	X	7
(Alberta) Deb Santos	0	0	0	0	0	X	X	X	0

Sheet 8	1	2	3	4	5	6	7	8	Final
(Alberta) Lisa Parent	1	0	0	3	3	1	X	X	8
(Alberta) Adele Purcell	0	1	1	0	0	0	X	X	2

==== Draw 3 ====
Friday, October 21, 9:30 pm

Sheet 3	1	2	3	4	5	6	7	8	Final
(Scotland) Rebecca Morrison	0	3	0	X	X	X	X	X	3
(Alberta) Adele Purcell	0	0	1	X	X	X	X	X	1

Sheet 4	1	2	3	4	5	6	7	8	Final
(Alberta) Deb Santos	4	0	2	3	1	X	X	X	10
(Alberta) Lisa Parent	0	3	0	0	0	X	X	X	3

Sheet 5	1	2	3	4	5	6	7	8	Final
(Switzerland) Michèle Jäggi	1	3	0	3	X	X	X	X	7
(Alberta) Nicky Kaufman	0	0	1	0	X	X	X	X	1

Sheet 6	1	2	3	4	5	6	7	8	Final
(Alberta) Emily Clark	2	1	0	2	1	0	0	0	6
(Alberta) Trina Ball	0	0	2	0	0	2	1	3	8

Sheet 7	1	2	3	4	5	6	7	8	Final
(South Korea) Ha Seung-youn	4	0	2	3	X	X	X	X	9
(Alberta) Kellie Stiksma	0	1	0	0	X	X	X	X	1

Sheet 8	1	2	3	4	5	6	7	8	Final
(Alberta) Michelle Hartwell	0	0	1	0	0	2	1	2	6
(Australia) Jennifer Westhagen	1	2	0	1	1	0	0	0	5

==== Draw 5 ====
Saturday, October 22, 12:00 pm

Sheet 3	1	2	3	4	5	6	7	8	Final
(Alberta) Marla Sherrer	2	0	1	1	0	0	0	X	4
(Alberta) Michelle Hartwell	0	4	0	0	2	1	2	X	9

Sheet 4	1	2	3	4	5	6	7	8	Final
(South Korea) Ha Seung-youn	2	0	0	1	3	4	X	X	10
(Australia) Jennifer Westhagen	0	2	0	0	0	0	X	X	2

Sheet 5	1	2	3	4	5	6	7	8	Final
(Scotland) Rebecca Morrison	0	3	0	1	0	2	0	X	6
(Alberta) Lisa Parent	0	0	1	0	2	0	1	X	4

Sheet 6	1	2	3	4	5	6	7	8	Final
(Alberta) Adele Purcell	0	1	0	1	2	0	0	0	4
(Alberta) Deb Santos	0	0	0	0	0	2	2	3	7

Sheet 7	1	2	3	4	5	6	7	8	Final
(Alberta) Jessica Wytrychowski	0	4	0	0	1	0	0	1	6
(Alberta) Emily Clark	1	0	1	3	0	1	1	0	7

Sheet 8	1	2	3	4	5	6	7	8	Final
(Switzerland) Michèle Jäggi	2	3	0	3	X	X	X	X	8
(Alberta) Trina Ball	0	0	1	0	X	X	X	X	1

==== Draw 6 ====
Saturday, October 22, 4:00 pm

Sheet 3	1	2	3	4	5	6	7	8	Final
(Switzerland) Michèle Jäggi	0	2	0	0	3	0	1	0	6
(Alberta) Jessica Wytrychowski	2	0	0	2	0	0	0	3	7

Sheet 4	1	2	3	4	5	6	7	8	Final
(Alberta) Nicky Kaufman	1	1	0	0	1	2	2	X	7
(Alberta) Trina Ball	0	0	1	1	0	0	0	X	2

Sheet 5	1	2	3	4	5	6	7	8	Final
(South Korea) Ha Seung-youn	1	1	0	2	2	1	3	X	10
(Alberta) Marla Sherrer	0	0	2	0	0	0	0	X	2

Sheet 6	1	2	3	4	5	6	7	8	Final
(Alberta) Kellie Stiksma	2	0	3	0	1	0	0	X	6
(Australia) Jennifer Westhagen	0	0	0	1	0	1	1	X	3

Sheet 7	1	2	3	4	5	6	7	8	Final
(Alberta) Lisa Parent	0	1	3	0	1	1	0	X	6
(Alberta) Adele Purcell	2	0	0	1	0	0	2	X	5

Sheet 8	1	2	3	4	5	6	7	8	Final
(Scotland) Rebecca Morrison	0	2	0	2	2	2	X	X	8
(Alberta) Deb Santos	1	0	1	0	0	0	X	X	2

==== Draw 8 ====
Saturday, October 22, 9:30 pm

Sheet 3	1	2	3	4	5	6	7	8	Final
(Alberta) Nicky Kaufman	1	0	0	2	1	1	0	0	5
(Alberta) Emily Clark	0	3	3	0	0	0	2	1	9

Sheet 6	1	2	3	4	5	6	7	8	Final
(Alberta) Jessica Wytrychowski	0	0	2	1	2	0	2	X	7
(Alberta) Trina Ball	0	1	0	0	0	1	0	X	2

Sheet 7	1	2	3	4	5	6	7	8	Final
(Alberta) Marla Sherrer	1	3	0	1	1	1	X	X	7
(Australia) Jennifer Westhagen	0	0	1	0	0	0	X	X	1

Sheet 8	1	2	3	4	5	6	7	8	Final
(Alberta) Kellie Stiksma	1	0	2	0	0	1	0	X	4
(Alberta) Michelle Hartwell	0	3	0	1	1	0	1	X	6

=== Playoffs ===
Quarterfinals
1	(Scotland) Rebecca Morrison	7
8	(Alberta) Lisa Parent	1
4	(South Korea) Ha Seung-youn	7
5	(Alberta) Marla Sherrer	1
2	(Alberta) Michelle Hartwell	4
7	(Alberta) Jessica Wytrychowski	3
3	(Switzerland) Michèle Jäggi	6
6	(Alberta) Nicky Kaufman	2

Semifinals
1	(Scotland) Rebecca Morrison	7
4	(South Korea) Ha Seung-youn	2
2	(Alberta) Michelle Hartwell	4
3	(Switzerland) Michèle Jäggi	9

Final
1	(Scotland) Rebecca Morrison	6
3	(Switzerland) Michèle Jäggi	4

==== Quarterfinals ====
Sunday, October 23, 9:00 am

Sheet 4	1	2	3	4	5	6	7	8	Final
(Scotland) Rebecca Morrison	0	2	1	2	0	2	X	X	7
(Alberta) Lisa Parent	0	0	0	0	1	0	X	X	1

Sheet 5	1	2	3	4	5	6	7	8	Final
(South Korea) Ha Seung-youn	0	4	1	0	2	X	X	X	7
(Alberta) Marla Sherrer	0	0	0	1	0	X	X	X	1

Sheet 6	1	2	3	4	5	6	7	8	Final
(Alberta) Michelle Hartwell	0	0	1	1	1	0	0	1	4
(Alberta) Jessica Wytrychowski	0	1	0	0	0	1	1	0	3

Sheet 7	1	2	3	4	5	6	7	8	Final
(Switzerland) Michèle Jäggi	0	0	2	0	2	1	1	X	6
(Alberta) Nicky Kaufman	1	0	0	1	0	0	0	X	2

==== Semifinals ====
Sunday, October 23, 12:00 pm

Sheet 5	1	2	3	4	5	6	7	8	Final
(Alberta) Michelle Hartwell	1	0	1	0	0	2	0	X	4
(Switzerland) Michèle Jäggi	0	3	0	2	2	0	2	X	9

Sheet 6	1	2	3	4	5	6	7	8	Final
(Scotland) Rebecca Morrison	0	2	0	1	3	0	1	X	7
(South Korea) Ha Seung-youn	0	0	0	0	0	2	0	X	2

==== Final ====
Sunday, October 23, 3:00 pm

Sheet 3	1	2	3	4	5	6	7	8	Final
(Scotland) Rebecca Morrison	1	0	1	2	0	2	0	X	6
(Switzerland) Michèle Jäggi	0	2	0	0	1	0	1	X	4
