= Ikue Kitazawa =

Japanese curler (born 1996)

- Curler
- Born: October 12, 1996 (age 30); Karuizawa, Nagano

Team
- Curling club: Karuizawa CC, Karuizawa
- Skip: Ikue Kitazawa
- Third: Seina Nakajima
- Second: Minori Suzuki
- Lead: Hasumi Ishigooka
- Alternate: Ami Enami
- Mixed doubles partner: Shingo Usui

Curling career
- Member Association: Japan
- World Championship: 2 (2019, 2022)
- Pacific-Asia Championship: 1 (2019)
Medal record
Women's Curling
Representing Japan
Pacific-Asia Championships
Silver medal – second place	2019 Shenzhen
Representing Nagano
Japan Curling Championships
Gold medal – first place	2017 Karuizawa
Gold medal – first place	2019 Sapporo
Silver medal – second place	2020 Karuizawa
Silver medal – second place	2022 Tokoro
Bronze medal – third place	2018 Nayoro
Bronze medal – third place	2021 Wakkanai
Bronze medal – third place	2023 Tokoro
Bronze medal – third place	2024 Sapporo

Ikue Kitazawa (北澤 育恵, Kitazawa Ikue; born October 12, 1996 in Karuizawa) is a Japanese curler from Saku, Nagano. She is the skip of the Chubu Electric Power curling team, which won the Japan Curling Championships in both 2017 and 2019. At the international level, she has represented Japan twice at the World Women's Curling Championship (2019, 2022) and the 2019 Pacific-Asia Curling Championships, where she won a silver medal.

== Career ==
Kitazawa and her team of Chiaki Matsumura, Emi Shimizu, Hasumi Ishigooka and Seina Nakajima broke onto the national stage during the 2016–17 season when the team won the 2017 Japan Curling Championships. After suffering defeats to the Satsuki Fujisawa rink in both the round robin and 1 vs. 2 page playoff games, the team, representing Chubu Electric Power, edged Fujisawa by a score of 7–5 in the final game. Although they won the national championship, the team did not compete in the 2017 World Women's Curling Championship as Team Fujisawa failed to finish in the top two at the 2016 Pacific-Asia Curling Championships. Also during the 2016–17 season, Team Matsumura finished runner-up at the 2016 Canad Inns Women's Classic World Curling Tour event, falling in the final to Rachel Homan.

In September 2017, the 2017 Japanese Olympic Curling Trials were held between Japan's top two rinks, Loco Solare (Satsuki Fujisawa) and Chubu Electric Power (Matsumura) to determine Japan's representative in the women's event for the 2018 Winter Olympics. After splitting the first two games, Team Fujisawa won the next two games to secure a 3–1 victory in the best-of-five series. At the 2018 national championship, Team Matsumura could not defend their title as they fell in the semifinal game to Fujikyu (Tori Koana).

The following season, Kitazawa was promoted to fourth on the team, with alternate Seina Nakajima moving up to throw second stones but skip the team. On the tour, the team reached the final of the Hokkaido Bank Curling Classic and the semifinals of both the Red Deer Curling Classic and the Karuizawa International. At the 2019 Japan Championship, the team went undefeated through the round robin with a perfect 8–0 record. They then defeated Loco Solare again in the 1 vs. 2 game to advance to the final, where they again faced Fujisawa. In the final, Team Nakajima took four in the fifth end followed by a steal of three in the sixth, aiding them in securing their second Japanese championship. By winning the Japanese championship, Kitazawa and teammates Seina Nakajima, Chiaki Matsumura, Hasumi Ishigooka and Emi Shimizu represented Japan at the 2019 World Women's Curling Championship. It was Kitazawa's first international curling event. At the world championships, the team squeaked into the playoffs with a 6–6 record, before upsetting the third place Russian team in the quarterfinals. They then lost to Sweden in the semifinal, and lost to South Korea in the bronze medal game, settling for fourth place.

Kitazawa and her team represented Japan at the 2019 Pacific-Asia Curling Championships in Shenzhen, China the following season. After going 6–1 in the round robin and defeating Hong Kong in the semifinal, they lost in the final to China's Han Yu. The team lost in the final of the Advics Cup at the start of the season, and reached the semifinals of the International Bernese Ladies Cup. At the 2020 Japan Curling Championships, Team Nakajima once again went undefeated through the round robin with an 8–0 record. They then lost in the 1 vs. 2 game to Fujisawa, before bouncing back with a semifinal victory over Hokkaido Bank Fortius (Sayaka Yoshimura). In a tight final game, Loco Solare scored a single in an extra end to win the national championship by a final score of 7–6.

Team Nakajima played in no World Curling Tour events during the abbreviated 2020–21 season as there were no events held in Japan or Asia. The team would compete in the 2021 Japan Curling Championships, held from February 8 to 14, 2021 in Wakkanai, Hokkaido. The team posted a 4–2 record through the round robin of the national championship, earning them a spot in the 3 vs. 4 page playoff game. After defeating Fujikyu in the 3 vs. 4, they lost in the semifinal to Hokkaido Bank Fortius, eliminating them from contention.

Back on tour for the 2021–22 season, Team Nakajima finished third at the 2021 Hokkaido Bank Curling Classic. Because Team Fujisawa won the 2021 Japanese Olympic Curling Trials and were representing Japan at the 2022 Winter Olympics, a world championship trial was held between Chubu Electric Power, Fujikyu and Hokkaido Bank Fortius to determine who would represent Japan at the 2022 World Women's Curling Championship. Chubu Electric posted a 3–1 record in the qualifying round, earning them a spot in the best-of-three final against Yoshimura. After splitting the first two games, the Nakajima rink took one in the tenth end of the final game to earn the berth as Team Japan at the World Championship. The team altered their lineup for the World Championship, with Kitazawa being named as the official skip of the team. In Prince George, British Columbia, Canada for the Worlds, the Japanese team again went 6–6 through the round robin, however, it was not enough to qualify for the playoff round, and they placed seventh. The team wrapped up their season at the 2022 Japan Curling Championships. There, Chubu Electric finished 6–2 through the round robin and qualified for the playoffs as the third seed. They won the 3 vs. 4 game 12–2 over Fortius (Yoshimura) and then beat Hokkaido Bank (Tabata) 7–5 in the semifinal. In the final, they fell 7–3 to Fujisawa's Loco Solare rink.

Team Kitazawa began the 2022–23 season with a third-place finish at the 2022 Hokkaido Bank Curling Classic. While in Canada, the team had one of their most successful seasons to date, beginning with a quarterfinal finish at the 2022 Saville Shoot-Out. They then won back-to-back tour events at the 2022 Alberta Curling Series Major and the KW Fall Classic. They also reached the finals of the Prestige Hotels & Resorts Curling Classic, the Driving Force Decks Int'l Abbotsford Cashspiel and the fourth event of the 2022 Alberta Curling Series. In the new year, the team competed in the 2023 Japan Curling Championships for the chance to represent Japan at the 2023 World Women's Curling Championship. There, the team finished second through the round robin with a 6–2 record. They then lost the 1 vs. 2 game and the semifinal to Loco Solare and SC Karuizawa Club (Kanai) respectively, finishing third.

== Personal life ==
Kitazawa is employed as an office worker.

== Grand Slam record ==
Key
C	Champion
F	Lost in Final
SF	Lost in Semifinal
QF	Lost in Quarterfinals
R16	Lost in the round of 16
Q	Did not advance to playoffs
T2	Played in Tier 2 event
DNP	Did not participate in event
N/A	Not a Grand Slam event that season

Event	2023–24	2024–25	2025–26	2026–27
Invitational	T2	T2	DNP	DNP
Masters	DNP	Q	T2	SF
National	DNP	DNP	Q	QF
Open	DNP	Q	Q	
Players'	DNP	DNP	Q	

== Teams ==
Season	Skip	Third	Second	Lead	Alternate
2013–14	Ikue Kitazawa	Seina Nakajima	Minori Suzuki	Eri Ogihara	Ayoko Tanimoto
2014–15	Satsuki Fujisawa	Emi Shimizu	Chiaki Matsumura	Ikue Kitazawa	Hasumi Ishigooka
2015–16	Emi Shimizu	Chiaki Matsumura	Hasumi Ishigooka	Ikue Kitazawa	
2016–17	Chiaki Matsumura	Emi Shimizu	Ikue Kitazawa	Hasumi Ishigooka	Seina Nakajima
2017–18	Chiaki Matsumura	Emi Shimizu	Ikue Kitazawa	Hasumi Ishigooka	Seina Nakajima
2018–19	Ikue Kitazawa (Fourth)	Chiaki Matsumura	Seina Nakajima (Skip)	Hasumi Ishigooka	Emi Shimizu
2019–20	Ikue Kitazawa (Fourth)	Chiaki Matsumura	Seina Nakajima (Skip)	Hasumi Ishigooka	Emi Shimizu
2020–21	Ikue Kitazawa (Fourth)	Chiaki Matsumura	Seina Nakajima (Skip)	Hasumi Ishigooka	Minori Suzuki
2021–22	Ikue Kitazawa	Seina Nakajima	Minori Suzuki	Hasumi Ishigooka	Chiaki Matsumura
2022–23	Ikue Kitazawa	Seina Nakajima	Minori Suzuki	Hasumi Ishigooka	Chiaki Matsumura
2023–24	Ikue Kitazawa	Seina Nakajima	Ami Enami	Minori Suzuki	Hasumi Ishigooka
2024–25	Ikue Kitazawa	Seina Nakajima	Ami Enami	Minori Suzuki	Hasumi Ishigooka
2025–26	Ikue Kitazawa	Seina Nakajima	Minori Suzuki	Hasumi Ishigooka	Ami Enami
2026–27	Ikue Kitazawa	Seina Nakajima	Minori Suzuki	Hasumi Ishigooka	Ami Enami
