= Tournoi Hommes Circuit Provincial =

- Established: 2022
- Host city: Maniwaki, Quebec
- Arena: Club de curling Vallée-de-la-Gatineau
- Purse: $10,000
- 2024 champion: Yannick Martel

The Tournoi Hommes Circuit Provincial (English: Men's Provincial Circuit Tournament) also known as the Open de Maniwaki, Invitation Vallée de la Gatineau, the Tournoi Homme de Maniwaki or the Tournoi de curling circuit provincial is an annual men's curling tournament of the Quebec Curling Circuit, a curling tour organized by Curling Québec. The event is worth points toward the World Curling Team Rankings.

The event began in 2022. Its purse is $10,000. It is usually held annually in February or March at the Club de curling Vallée-de-la-Gatineau in Maniwaki, Quebec.

== Winners ==
Year	Champion team	Runner-up team	Purse
2022	Robert Desjardins, François Gionest, Pierre-Luc Morissette, Marco Fortier	Yannick Martel, Jean-François Charest, Philippe Brassard, René Dubois	$10,000
2023	Pierre Lajoie, Benoît Gagné, Maxime Bilodeau, Mathieu Paquet (skip)	Yannick Martel, Jean-François Charest, Jean-Pierre Larouche, Martin Asselin	$10,000
2024	Yannick Martel, François Gionest, Jean-François Charest, Éric Savard	Normand Bornais, Samuel Bornais, David Jutras, François Bornais	$10,000
