= 2023 Canadian Wheelchair Curling Championship =

- Host city: Moose Jaw, Saskatchewan
- Arena: Moose Jaw Ford Curling Centre
- Dates: March 20–24
- Winner: Saskatchewan 1
- Curling club: Moose Jaw Ford CC, Moose Jaw
- Skip: Gil Dash
- Third: Marie Wright
- Second: Darwin Bender
- Lead: Moose Gibson
- Coach: Lorraine Arguin
- Finalist: Northern Ontario (Dean)

The 2023 Canadian Wheelchair Curling Championship was held from March 20 to 24 at the Moose Jaw Ford Curling Centre in Moose Jaw, Saskatchewan. This was the first time the championship was held since 2019 as it was cancelled due to the COVID-19 pandemic in 2020, 2021 and 2022.

== Teams ==
The teams are listed as follows:

Province / Territory	Skip	Third	Second	Lead	Alternate	Locale
Alberta 1	Jack Smart	Martin Purvis	Terry Fowler	Wendy Frazier	Kendra Ohama	Garrison CC, Calgary
Alberta 2	Don Kuchelyma	Stephan Vindis	Emma Nagel	Marie Laframboise		Avonair CC, Edmonton
British Columbia	Gerry Austgarden	Ina Forrest	Rick Robinson	Glen McDonald		Kelowna/Vernon/Richmond
New Brunswick	Michael Fitzgerald	Sarah Benevides	James O'Hara	Elaine Mazerolle		Thistle-St. Andrews CC, Saint John
Newfoundland and Labrador	Cecilia Carroll	Felix Green	Katie Hubbard	–		St. John's CC, St. John's
Northern Ontario	Douglas Dean	Gino Sonego	Rick Bell	Lola Graham		Fort William CC, Thunder Bay
Nova Scotia	Laughie Rutt	Stephan Parfitt	Rose Pearle	Edie Lloyd	Ann White	Lakeshore CC, Lower Sackville
Ontario 1	Jon Thurston	Collinda Joseph	Karl Allen	Chrissy Molnar		King CC, Schomberg
Ontario 2	Paul Grose	Tony Reynen	Jim Law	Shannon Wilcox	Jillian Hopkins	Ilderton CC, Ilderton
Quebec	Benoît Lessard	Carl Marquis	Johanne Mathieu	François Lacourse		CC Magog, Magog
Saskatchewan 1	Gil Dash	Marie Wright	Darwin Bender	Moose Gibson		Moose Jaw Ford CC, Moose Jaw
Saskatchewan 2	Rodney Pederson	Stewart McKeown	Sheryl Pederson	Russell Whitsitt		Moose Jaw Ford CC, Moose Jaw

== Round robin standings ==
Final Round Robin Standings

Key
Teams to Championship Pool

Pool A	Skip	W	L	PF	PA	EW	EL	BE	SE
Northern Ontario	Douglas Dean	5	0	40	22	20	16	0	9
Saskatchewan 1	Gil Dash	4	1	45	17	21	13	2	10
British Columbia	Gerry Austgarden	3	2	39	22	21	15	1	9
Ontario 2	Paul Grose	2	3	33	29	21	15	1	13
New Brunswick	Michael Fitzgerald	1	4	21	28	15	20	0	6
Alberta 2	Don Kuchelyma	0	5	10	70	8	27	0	1

Pool B	Skip	W	L	PF	PA	EW	EL	BE	SE
Alberta 1	Jack Smart	4	1	34	21	23	15	0	13
Quebec	Benoît Lessard	4	1	31	26	19	18	0	9
Ontario 1	Jon Thurston	3	2	35	23	17	17	0	6
Saskatchewan 2	Rodney Pederson	3	2	36	28	20	18	0	11
Newfoundland and Labrador	Cecilia Carroll	1	4	28	38	19	20	0	8
Nova Scotia	Laughie Rutt	0	5	21	49	13	23	0	2

== Round robin results ==
All draws are listed in Central Time (UTC−05:00).

=== Draw 1 ===
Monday, March 20, 2:00 pm

Sheet 2	1	2	3	4	5	6	7	8	Final
Nova Scotia (Rutt)	1	3	0	0	1	0	0	X	5
Ontario 1 (Thurston)	0	0	3	1	0	4	1	X	9

Sheet 3	1	2	3	4	5	6	7	8	Final
Quebec (Lessard)	2	0	0	0	0	1	1	2	6
Saskatchewan 2 (Pederson)	0	1	1	2	1	0	0	0	5

Sheet 4	1	2	3	4	5	6	7	8	Final
Ontario 2 (Grose)	2	1	0	0	1	2	1	0	7
New Brunswick (Fitzgerald)	0	0	1	1	0	0	0	1	3

Sheet 5	1	2	3	4	5	6	7	8	EE	Final
Newfoundland and Labrador (Carroll)	0	2	1	0	0	2	1	0	0	6
Alberta 1 (Smart)	1	0	0	1	1	0	0	3	1	7

Sheet 6	1	2	3	4	5	6	7	8	EE	Final
Northern Ontario (Dean)	1	0	2	0	0	1	0	3	1	8
Saskatchewan 1 (Dash)	0	2	0	1	1	0	3	0	0	7

Sheet 7	1	2	3	4	5	6	7	8	Final
Alberta 2 (Kuchelyma)	0	0	1	0	1	0	0	0	2
British Columbia (Austgarden)	5	2	0	3	0	1	2	5	18

=== Draw 2 ===
Monday, March 20, 7:00 pm

Sheet 2	1	2	3	4	5	6	7	8	Final
Saskatchewan 2 (Pederson)	1	3	1	0	0	0	0	1	6
Newfoundland and Labrador (Carroll)	0	0	0	1	1	1	2	0	5

Sheet 3	1	2	3	4	5	6	7	8	Final
British Columbia (Austgarden)	0	1	1	1	0	1	2	X	6
New Brunswick (Fitzgerald)	1	0	0	0	1	0	0	X	2

Sheet 4	1	2	3	4	5	6	7	8	Final
Ontario 1 (Thurston)	2	0	0	0	2	0	0	X	4
Quebec (Lessard)	0	1	1	3	0	2	1	X	8

Sheet 5	1	2	3	4	5	6	7	8	Final
Saskatchewan 1 (Dash)	4	4	5	1	3	0	X	X	17
Alberta 2 (Kuchelyma)	0	0	0	0	0	1	X	X	1

Sheet 6	1	2	3	4	5	6	7	8	Final
Alberta 1 (Smart)	3	2	1	0	1	0	1	X	8
Nova Scotia (Rutt)	0	0	0	1	0	2	0	X	3

Sheet 7	1	2	3	4	5	6	7	8	Final
Ontario 2 (Grose)	1	1	0	0	2	1	0	X	5
Northern Ontario (Dean)	0	0	4	0	0	0	4	X	8

=== Draw 3 ===
Tuesday, March 21, 2:00 pm

Sheet 2	1	2	3	4	5	6	7	8	Final
Quebec (Lessard)	1	0	0	0	0	0	1	X	2
Alberta 1 (Smart)	0	1	2	1	2	2	0	X	8

Sheet 3	1	2	3	4	5	6	7	8	Final
Northern Ontario (Dean)	3	3	3	0	0	1	0	X	10
Alberta 2 (Kuchelyma)	0	0	0	1	2	0	2	X	5

Sheet 4	1	2	3	4	5	6	7	8	Final
Newfoundland and Labrador (Carroll)	0	1	1	1	0	2	0	4	9
Nova Scotia (Rutt)	2	0	0	0	2	0	2	0	6

Sheet 5	1	2	3	4	5	6	7	8	Final
Ontario 1 (Thurston)	2	2	2	0	1	0	1	X	8
Saskatchewan 2 (Pederson)	0	0	0	1	0	1	0	X	2

Sheet 6	1	2	3	4	5	6	7	8	Final
British Columbia (Austgarden)	2	0	1	0	5	0	0	1	9
Ontario 2 (Grose)	0	1	0	1	0	2	1	0	5

Sheet 7	1	2	3	4	5	6	7	8	Final
New Brunswick (Fitzgerald)	1	0	0	1	0	1	0	X	3
Saskatchewan 1 (Dash)	0	0	3	0	3	0	1	X	7

=== Draw 4 ===
Tuesday, March 21, 7:00 pm

Sheet 2	1	2	3	4	5	6	7	8	Final
Northern Ontario (Dean)	0	0	1	0	0	3	3	X	7
British Columbia (Austgarden)	1	1	0	1	1	0	0	X	4

Sheet 3	1	2	3	4	5	6	7	8	Final
Saskatchewan 1 (Dash)	0	1	2	2	1	0	2	X	8
Ontario 2 (Grose)	2	0	0	0	0	1	0	X	3

Sheet 4	1	2	3	4	5	6	7	8	Final
Alberta 1 (Smart)	0	1	1	0	3	0	0	0	5
Saskatchewan 2 (Pederson)	1	0	0	1	0	1	4	1	8

Sheet 5	1	2	3	4	5	6	7	8	Final
Nova Scotia (Rutt)	0	0	1	0	0	1	1	X	3
Quebec (Lessard)	1	3	0	3	1	0	0	X	8

Sheet 6	1	2	3	4	5	6	7	8	Final
Alberta 2 (Kuchelyma)	0	0	0	1	0	0	0	X	1
New Brunswick (Fitzgerald)	2	2	1	0	2	3	2	X	12

Sheet 7	1	2	3	4	5	6	7	8	Final
Newfoundland and Labrador (Carroll)	0	1	0	1	0	0	X	X	2
Ontario 1 (Thurston)	2	0	3	0	2	5	X	X	12

=== Draw 5 ===
Wednesday, March 22, 2:00 pm

Sheet 2	1	2	3	4	5	6	7	8	Final
Ontario 2 (Grose)	4	1	2	1	0	4	1	X	13
Alberta 2 (Kuchelyma)	0	0	0	0	1	0	0	X	1

Sheet 3	1	2	3	4	5	6	7	8	Final
Alberta 1 (Smart)	2	1	0	1	1	1	0	X	6
Ontario 1 (Thurston)	0	0	1	0	0	0	1	X	2

Sheet 4	1	2	3	4	5	6	7	8	Final
British Columbia (Austgarden)	1	0	0	0	0	1	0	0	2
Saskatchewan 1 (Dash)	0	0	1	3	0	0	1	1	6

Sheet 5	1	2	3	4	5	6	7	8	Final
New Brunswick (Fitzgerald)	0	1	0	0	0	0	0	X	1
Northern Ontario (Dean)	2	0	1	1	1	1	1	X	7

Sheet 6	1	2	3	4	5	6	7	8	Final
Quebec (Lessard)	0	1	0	0	1	1	0	4	7
Newfoundland and Labrador (Carroll)	1	0	1	3	0	0	1	0	6

Sheet 7	1	2	3	4	5	6	7	8	Final
Saskatchewan 2 (Pederson)	0	4	2	1	0	3	5	X	15
Nova Scotia (Rutt)	1	0	0	0	3	0	0	X	4

== Seeding pool ==
=== Standings ===
Final Seeding Pool Standings

Team	Skip	W	L	PF	PA	EW	EL	BE	SE
Ontario 2	Paul Grose	5	3	63	40	35	21	1	21
Saskatchewan 2	Rodney Pederson	5	3	54	49	31	27	0	17
Newfoundland and Labrador	Cecilia Carroll	3	5	48	51	32	28	0	12
New Brunswick	Michael Fitzgerald	1	7	27	54	19	35	0	6
Nova Scotia	Laughie Rutt	1	7	36	69	21	34	0	6
Alberta 2	Don Kuchelyma	1	7	28	86	18	38	1	7

=== Results ===
==== Draw 6 ====
Wednesday, March 22, 7:00 pm

Sheet 3	1	2	3	4	5	6	7	8	Final
Saskatchewan 2 (Pederson)	0	0	1	1	2	0	0	3	7
Alberta 2 (Kuchelyma)	1	1	0	0	0	0	4	0	6

Sheet 4	1	2	3	4	5	6	7	8	Final
Newfoundland and Labrador (Carroll)	0	0	2	0	0	2	0	X	4
Ontario 2 (Grose)	2	1	0	1	2	0	3	X	9

Sheet 5	1	2	3	4	5	6	7	8	Final
Nova Scotia (Rutt)	2	2	4	2	0	1	X	X	11
New Brunswick (Fitzgerald)	0	0	0	0	2	0	X	X	2

==== Draw 7 ====
Thursday, March 23, 2:00 pm

Sheet 3	1	2	3	4	5	6	7	8	Final
Ontario 2 (Grose)	0	3	3	1	1	0	1	X	9
Nova Scotia (Rutt)	2	0	0	0	0	1	0	X	3

Sheet 5	1	2	3	4	5	6	7	8	Final
Alberta 2 (Kuchelyma)	0	1	0	0	0	0	2	0	3
Newfoundland and Labrador (Carroll)	1	0	1	3	1	1	0	1	8

Sheet 6	1	2	3	4	5	6	7	8	Final
New Brunswick (Fitzgerald)	1	0	2	0	0	0	0	X	3
Saskatchewan 2 (Pederson)	0	1	0	1	1	2	2	X	7

==== Draw 8 ====
Thursday, March 23, 7:00 pm

Sheet 2	1	2	3	4	5	6	7	8	Final
Newfoundland and Labrador (Carroll)	2	1	2	0	2	1	X	X	8
New Brunswick (Fitzgerald)	0	0	0	1	0	0	X	X	1

Sheet 4	1	2	3	4	5	6	7	8	Final
Nova Scotia (Rutt)	0	0	0	0	0	1	X	X	1
Alberta 2 (Kuchelyma)	2	3	1	1	2	0	X	X	9

Sheet 5	1	2	3	4	5	6	7	8	Final
Saskatchewan 2 (Pederson)	0	0	0	2	2	0	X	X	4
Ontario 2 (Grose)	2	3	5	0	0	2	X	X	12

== Championship pool ==
=== Standings ===
Final Championship Pool Standings

Key
Teams to Playoffs

Team	Skip	W	L	PF	PA	EW	EL	BE	SE
Northern Ontario	Douglas Dean	7	1	61	40	31	28	0	13
Saskatchewan 1	Gil Dash	6	2	71	33	32	24	2	12
Alberta 1	Jack Smart	5	3	49	42	34	25	0	17
British Columbia	Gerry Austgarden	5	3	59	36	34	23	1	19
Ontario 1	Jon Thurston	5	3	57	45	28	29	0	10
Quebec	Benoît Lessard	4	4	42	50	28	31	0	13

=== Results ===
==== Draw 6 ====
Wednesday, March 22, 7:00 pm

Sheet 2	1	2	3	4	5	6	7	8	Final
Northern Ontario (Dean)	1	4	0	1	0	0	3	X	9
Ontario 1 (Thurston)	0	0	1	0	1	2	0	X	4

Sheet 6	1	2	3	4	5	6	7	8	Final
Saskatchewan 1 (Dash)	2	0	5	0	0	2	0	X	9
Alberta 1 (Smart)	0	1	0	1	1	0	1	X	4

Sheet 7	1	2	3	4	5	6	7	8	Final
British Columbia (Austgarden)	4	0	1	1	1	1	0	X	8
Quebec (Lessard)	0	1	0	0	0	0	1	X	2

==== Draw 7 ====
Thursday, March 23, 2:00 pm

Sheet 2	1	2	3	4	5	6	7	8	Final
Alberta 1 (Smart)	0	1	0	0	0	2	1	X	4
British Columbia (Austgarden)	1	0	3	3	1	0	0	X	8

Sheet 4	1	2	3	4	5	6	7	8	EE	Final
Quebec (Lessard)	2	2	0	0	1	1	1	0	0	7
Northern Ontario (Dean)	0	0	3	3	0	0	0	1	1	8

Sheet 7	1	2	3	4	5	6	7	8	EE	Final
Ontario 1 (Thurston)	2	0	0	1	5	0	1	0	1	10
Saskatchewan 1 (Dash)	0	1	2	0	0	2	0	4	0	9

==== Draw 8 ====
Thursday, March 23, 7:00 pm

Sheet 3	1	2	3	4	5	6	7	8	Final
Saskatchewan 1 (Dash)	3	0	1	0	3	1	X	X	8
Quebec (Lessard)	0	1	0	1	0	0	X	X	2

Sheet 6	1	2	3	4	5	6	7	8	Final
British Columbia (Austgarden)	0	1	1	1	1	0	0	X	4
Ontario 1 (Thurston)	3	0	0	0	0	3	2	X	8

Sheet 7	1	2	3	4	5	6	7	8	Final
Northern Ontario (Dean)	0	1	0	0	1	0	2	X	4
Alberta 1 (Smart)	3	0	2	1	0	1	0	X	7

== Playoffs ==
Semifinal			Final
			1	Northern Ontario	2
2	Saskatchewan 1	8	2	Saskatchewan 1	6
3	Alberta 1	2

=== Semifinal ===
Friday, March 24, 9:00 am

Sheet 7	1	2	3	4	5	6	7	8	Final
Saskatchewan 1 (Dash)	1	1	0	2	0	1	3	X	8
Alberta 1 (Smart)	0	0	1	0	1	0	0	X	2

=== Final ===
Friday, March 24, 1:30 pm

Sheet 7	1	2	3	4	5	6	7	8	Final
Northern Ontario (Dean)	0	0	0	1	0	0	1	X	2
Saskatchewan 1 (Dash)	2	1	1	0	1	1	0	X	6

== Final standings ==
Place	Team
1st place, gold medalist(s)	Saskatchewan 1
2nd place, silver medalist(s)	Northern Ontario
3rd place, bronze medalist(s)	Alberta 1
4	British Columbia
5	Ontario 1
6	Quebec
7	Ontario 2
8	Saskatchewan 2
9	Newfoundland and Labrador
10	New Brunswick
11	Nova Scotia
12	Alberta 2
