= 2026 Bunge Prairie Pinnacle =

Canadian provincial women's curling championship

- Host city: Melville, Saskatchewan
- Arena: CN Community Centre
- Dates: January 5–11
- Winner: Team Campbell
- Curling club: Highland CC, Regina
- Skip: Jolene Campbell
- Third: Robyn Silvernagle
- Second: Rachel Big Eagle
- Lead: Dayna Demmans
- Coach: Ben Gamble
- Finalist: Jana Tisdale

The 2026 Bunge Prairie Pinnacle, the provincial women's curling championship for Saskatchewan, was held from January 5 to 11 at the CN Community Centre in Melville, Saskatchewan. The winning Jolene Campbell rink represented Saskatchewan at the 2026 Scotties Tournament of Hearts in Mississauga, Ontario. The event was held in conjunction with the 2026 SaskTel Tankard, the provincial men's championship.

== Qualification process ==
Qualification method	Berths	Qualifying teams
SaskCTRS Leaders	3	Sara Miller; Penny Barker; Jolene Campbell
CTRS Leaders	3	Nancy Martin; Ashley Thevenot; Jenna Enge
Last Chance Qualifier	3	Mandy Selzer; Jana Tisdale; Sherrilee Orsted

== Teams ==
The teams are listed as follows:

Skip	Third	Second	Lead	Alternate	Coach	Club
Penny Barker	Lindsay Bertsch	Taryn Schachtel	Danielle Sicinski		Sherry Anderson	Moose Jaw CC, Moose Jaw
Jolene Campbell	Robyn Silvernagle	Rachel Big Eagle	Dayna Demmans		Ben Gamble	Highland CC, Regina
Jenna Enge	Tanille Williamson	Jade Kerr	Jasmine Kerr		Trevor Kerr	Esterhazy CC, Esterhazy
Nancy Martin	Kadriana Lott	Christie Gamble	Colleen Ackerman (Note: Alternate Colleen Ackerman played lead, replacing Chaelynn Stewart who was on maternity leave.)	Chaelynn Stewart	Mark Lang	Martensville CC, Martensville
Sara Miller	Ashley Williamson	Callan Hamon	Hannah Rugg		Shannon England	Highland CC, Regina
Sherrilee Orsted	Candace Newkirk	Shalon Fleming	Nancy Inglis		Wayne Kiel	Callie CC, Regina
Mandy Selzer	Erin Barnhart	Megan Selzer	Sarah Slywka			Balgonie CC, Balgonie
Ashley Thevenot	Stephanie Schmidt	Taylor Stremick	Kaylin Skinner		Susan O'Connor	Martensville CC, Martensville
Jana Tisdale	Stephanie Bukurak	Chantel Martin	Carla Anaka	Jill Springer	Marcia Gudereit	Highland CC, Regina

== Round robin standings ==
Final Round Robin Standings

Key
Teams to Playoffs

Skip	W	L	W–L	PF	PA	EW	EL	BE	SE
Ashley Thevenot	8	0	–	71	45	43	28	2	16
Jolene Campbell	6	2	1–0	62	49	35	32	3	11
Penny Barker	6	2	0–1	70	55	40	31	2	13
Jana Tisdale	5	3	–	58	50	36	32	2	15
Sara Miller	3	5	1–0	49	51	33	35	5	12
Jenna Enge	3	5	0–1	55	65	37	37	3	16
Mandy Selzer	2	6	1–0	45	58	31	39	6	9
Nancy Martin	2	6	0–1	51	63	30	40	5	10
Sherrilee Orsted	1	7	–	35	60	26	37	4	7

== Round robin results ==
All draw times listed in Central Time (UTC−06:00).

=== Draw 1 ===
Monday, January 5, 9:00 am

Sheet 1	1	2	3	4	5	6	7	8	9	10	Final
Jolene Campbell	0	0	0	0	0	1	0	X	X	X	1
Jana Tisdale 🔨	2	2	1	1	0	0	3	X	X	X	9

Sheet 2	1	2	3	4	5	6	7	8	9	10	Final
Penny Barker 🔨	2	0	0	2	1	0	1	2	0	3	11
Nancy Martin	0	1	4	0	0	3	0	0	1	0	9

Sheet 3	1	2	3	4	5	6	7	8	9	10	Final
Sara Miller	0	0	0	0	2	0	1	1	1	X	5
Sherrilee Orsted 🔨	0	0	1	0	0	1	0	0	0	X	2

Sheet 4	1	2	3	4	5	6	7	8	9	10	Final
Jenna Enge	0	3	1	2	0	0	0	0	2	0	8
Ashley Thevenot 🔨	2	0	0	0	1	1	2	2	0	1	9

=== Draw 2 ===
Monday, January 5, 7:00 pm

Sheet 1	1	2	3	4	5	6	7	8	9	10	Final
Ashley Thevenot 🔨	1	0	0	1	1	0	1	0	5	X	9
Mandy Selzer	0	2	0	0	0	1	0	2	0	X	5

Sheet 2	1	2	3	4	5	6	7	8	9	10	Final
Sara Miller	0	2	0	0	4	0	0	0	1	2	9
Jenna Enge 🔨	0	0	1	1	0	1	1	2	0	0	6

Sheet 3	1	2	3	4	5	6	7	8	9	10	Final
Penny Barker 🔨	0	1	0	0	2	1	4	0	0	X	8
Jana Tisdale	0	0	2	1	0	0	0	1	2	X	6

Sheet 4	1	2	3	4	5	6	7	8	9	10	Final
Nancy Martin 🔨	0	0	1	1	0	0	1	0	1	X	4
Jolene Campbell	1	1	0	0	2	2	0	1	0	X	7

=== Draw 3 ===
Tuesday, January 6, 12:00 pm

Sheet 1	1	2	3	4	5	6	7	8	9	10	Final
Penny Barker 🔨	3	0	2	0	2	0	1	0	2	X	10
Sara Miller	0	1	0	2	0	2	0	1	0	X	6

Sheet 2	1	2	3	4	5	6	7	8	9	10	Final
Jana Tisdale	0	0	1	1	0	2	0	0	0	0	4
Ashley Thevenot 🔨	0	1	0	0	2	0	1	1	1	1	7

Sheet 3	1	2	3	4	5	6	7	8	9	10	Final
Jenna Enge	2	0	2	0	1	0	0	1	0	0	6
Jolene Campbell 🔨	0	3	0	2	0	0	2	0	1	2	10

Sheet 4	1	2	3	4	5	6	7	8	9	10	Final
Sherrilee Orsted 🔨	0	2	0	0	1	0	2	0	3	1	9
Mandy Selzer	1	0	2	2	0	1	0	2	0	0	8

=== Draw 4 ===
Tuesday, January 6, 8:00 pm

Sheet 1	1	2	3	4	5	6	7	8	9	10	11	Final
Jana Tisdale 🔨	1	0	0	2	1	3	0	1	0	0	1	9
Jenna Enge	0	3	1	0	0	0	1	0	1	2	0	8

Sheet 2	1	2	3	4	5	6	7	8	9	10	Final
Jolene Campbell 🔨	2	2	1	0	1	3	X	X	X	X	9
Sherrilee Orsted	0	0	0	2	0	0	X	X	X	X	2

Sheet 3	1	2	3	4	5	6	7	8	9	10	Final
Mandy Selzer	0	0	0	1	0	1	0	2	1	1	6
Nancy Martin 🔨	0	0	3	0	1	0	1	0	0	0	5

Sheet 4	1	2	3	4	5	6	7	8	9	10	Final
Ashley Thevenot 🔨	0	3	0	1	1	0	0	2	0	0	7
Sara Miller	1	0	2	0	0	0	1	0	1	1	6

=== Draw 5 ===
Wednesday, January 7, 2:00 pm

Sheet 1	1	2	3	4	5	6	7	8	9	10	Final
Nancy Martin	0	0	2	2	0	2	0	0	0	0	6
Sherrilee Orsted 🔨	1	1	0	0	1	0	1	0	0	1	5

Sheet 2	1	2	3	4	5	6	7	8	9	10	11	Final
Jenna Enge	0	1	0	0	2	0	0	0	1	1	1	6
Mandy Selzer 🔨	0	0	3	1	0	0	0	1	0	0	0	5

Sheet 3	1	2	3	4	5	6	7	8	9	10	Final
Jana Tisdale	0	2	1	0	1	0	0	1	1	0	6
Sara Miller 🔨	1	0	0	4	0	1	2	0	0	1	9

Sheet 4	1	2	3	4	5	6	7	8	9	10	Final
Jolene Campbell 🔨	3	0	1	0	3	0	3	0	2	X	12
Penny Barker	0	1	0	2	0	3	0	1	0	X	7

=== Draw 6 ===
Thursday, January 8, 8:00 am

Sheet 1	1	2	3	4	5	6	7	8	9	10	Final
Sara Miller 🔨	1	0	0	3	0	0	0	1	1	0	6
Jolene Campbell	0	2	3	0	0	1	1	0	0	2	9

Sheet 2	1	2	3	4	5	6	7	8	9	10	Final
Sherrilee Orsted 🔨	0	0	0	1	1	0	1	0	X	X	3
Penny Barker	2	1	1	0	0	2	0	2	X	X	8

Sheet 3	1	2	3	4	5	6	7	8	9	10	Final
Nancy Martin	0	0	1	0	0	3	0	0	3	0	7
Ashley Thevenot 🔨	1	2	0	1	1	0	1	2	0	3	11

Sheet 4	1	2	3	4	5	6	7	8	9	10	Final
Mandy Selzer 🔨	0	1	1	0	3	0	0	0	0	0	5
Jana Tisdale	0	0	0	1	0	1	2	1	0	2	7

=== Draw 7 ===
Thursday, January 8, 4:00 pm

Sheet 1	1	2	3	4	5	6	7	8	9	10	Final
Sherrilee Orsted	0	1	0	0	0	0	1	0	X	X	2
Ashley Thevenot 🔨	2	0	2	0	1	1	0	3	X	X	9

Sheet 2	1	2	3	4	5	6	7	8	9	10	Final
Nancy Martin	2	0	0	4	0	0	1	1	0	X	8
Jana Tisdale 🔨	0	2	0	0	2	3	0	0	5	X	12

Sheet 3	1	2	3	4	5	6	7	8	9	10	Final
Jolene Campbell 🔨	1	0	1	2	0	2	0	2	0	2	10
Mandy Selzer	0	1	0	0	2	0	1	0	2	0	6

Sheet 4	1	2	3	4	5	6	7	8	9	10	Final
Penny Barker 🔨	0	1	0	3	1	3	0	1	0	X	9
Jenna Enge	1	0	2	0	0	0	1	0	0	X	4

=== Draw 8 ===
Friday, January 9, 9:00 am

Sheet 1	1	2	3	4	5	6	7	8	9	10	Final
Mandy Selzer 🔨	0	0	2	1	0	0	1	0	1	0	5
Penny Barker	2	1	0	0	1	1	0	2	0	1	8

Sheet 2	1	2	3	4	5	6	7	8	9	10	Final
Ashley Thevenot 🔨	3	0	1	1	1	0	0	1	2	X	9
Jolene Campbell	0	1	0	0	0	1	2	0	0	X	4

Sheet 3	1	2	3	4	5	6	7	8	9	10	11	Final
Sherrilee Orsted	0	3	1	0	0	0	1	0	0	3	0	8
Jenna Enge 🔨	1	0	0	1	0	4	0	1	1	0	2	10

Sheet 4	1	2	3	4	5	6	7	8	9	10	Final
Sara Miller 🔨	0	0	0	0	0	1	0	2	1	0	4
Nancy Martin	0	1	2	1	0	0	1	0	0	1	6

=== Draw 9 ===
Friday, January 9, 7:00 pm

Sheet 1	1	2	3	4	5	6	7	8	9	10	Final
Jenna Enge 🔨	0	0	2	0	0	2	1	0	1	1	7
Nancy Martin	0	1	0	3	1	0	0	1	0	0	6

Sheet 2	1	2	3	4	5	6	7	8	9	10	Final
Mandy Selzer 🔨	0	1	1	0	0	0	0	1	0	2	5
Sara Miller	0	0	0	1	1	1	1	0	0	0	4

Sheet 3	1	2	3	4	5	6	7	8	9	10	Final
Ashley Thevenot	0	2	0	3	0	2	0	0	0	3	10
Penny Barker 🔨	2	0	1	0	2	0	0	2	2	0	9

Sheet 4	1	2	3	4	5	6	7	8	9	10	Final
Jana Tisdale 🔨	0	0	0	2	1	0	1	0	0	1	5
Sherrilee Orsted	1	0	0	0	0	1	0	1	1	0	4

== Playoffs ==
Page playoff system
1	Ashley Thevenot	7
2	Jolene Campbell	10
3	Penny Barker	6
4	Jana Tisdale	10

Semifinal
1	Ashley Thevenot	7
4	Jana Tisdale	8

Final
2	Jolene Campbell	4
4	Jana Tisdale	3

=== 1 vs. 2 ===
Saturday, January 10, 2:00 pm

Sheet B	1	2	3	4	5	6	7	8	9	10	Final
Ashley Thevenot 🔨	1	0	0	0	1	0	3	0	2	X	7
Jolene Campbell	0	0	2	3	0	2	0	3	0	X	10

=== 3 vs. 4 ===
Saturday, January 10, 2:00 pm

Sheet A	1	2	3	4	5	6	7	8	9	10	Final
Penny Barker 🔨	2	0	0	2	0	1	0	1	0	X	6
Jana Tisdale	0	1	1	0	2	0	4	0	2	X	10

=== Semifinal ===
Sunday, January 11, 9:00 am

Sheet B	1	2	3	4	5	6	7	8	9	10	11	Final
Ashley Thevenot 🔨	1	0	2	0	1	0	0	1	0	2	0	7
Jana Tisdale	0	2	0	3	0	0	1	0	1	0	1	8

=== Final ===
Sunday, January 11, 3:00 pm

Sheet C	1	2	3	4	5	6	7	8	9	10	Final
Jolene Campbell 🔨	0	1	0	0	2	0	0	0	0	1	4
Jana Tisdale	0	0	0	2	0	0	0	0	1	0	3

2026 Bunge Prairie Pinnacle

Jolene Campbell
2nd Saskatchewan Provincial Championship title
