= 2019 Colonial Square Ladies Classic =

World Curling Tour event

- Host city: Saskatoon, Saskatchewan
- Arena: Nutana Curling Club
- Dates: September 27–30
- Winner: (Ontario) Rachel Homan
- Curling club: Ottawa CC, Ottawa
- Skip: Rachel Homan
- Third: Emma Miskew
- Second: Joanne Courtney
- Lead: Lisa Weagle
- Finalist: (Manitoba) Tracy Fleury

The 2019 Colonial Square Ladies Classic was held from September 27 to 30 at the Nutana Curling Club in Saskatoon, Saskatchewan as part of the World Curling Tour. The event was held in a triple-knockout format with a purse of $30,000.

In the final, Rachel Homan of Ontario defeated Tracy Fleury of Manitoba to win her first tour event of the 2019–20 season. It was a third straight appearance in a final for Fleury, having won the 2019 Cargill Curling Training Centre Icebreaker and finishing runner-up at the 2019 AMJ Campbell Shorty Jenkins Classic.

== Teams ==
The teams are listed as follows:

| Skip | Third | Second | Lead | Locale |
|---|---|---|---|---|
| Skylar Ackerman | Emily Haupstein | Taylor Stremick | Abbey Johnson | Saskatoon, Saskatchewan |
| Sherry Anderson | Nancy Martin | Meaghan Frerichs | Chaelynn Kitz | Saskatoon, Saskatchewan |
| Brett Barber | Samantha Yachiw | Alyssa Kostyk | Kristin Ochitwa | Biggar, Saskatchewan |
| Penny Barker | Deanna Doig | Christie Gamble | Danielle Sicinski | Moose Jaw, Saskatchewan |
| Corryn Brown | Erin Pincott | Dezaray Hawes | Ashley Klymchuk | Kamloops, British Columbia |
| Michelle Englot | Sara England | Shelby Brandt | Stasia Wisniewski | Regina, Saskatchewan |
| Tracy Fleury | Selena Njegovan | Liz Fyfe | Kristin MacCuish | East St. Paul, Manitoba |
| Satsuki Fujisawa | Chinami Yoshida | Yumi Suzuki | Yurika Yoshida | Kitami, Japan |
| Amber Holland | Cindy Ricci | Laura Strong | Debbie Lozinski | Regina, Saskatchewan |
| Rachel Homan | Emma Miskew | Joanne Courtney | Lisa Weagle | Ottawa, Ontario |
| Ashley Howard | Kourtney Fesser | Krista Fesser | Kaylin Skinner | Saskatoon, Saskatchewan |
| Jennifer Jones | Kaitlyn Lawes | Jocelyn Peterman | Dawn McEwen | Winnipeg, Manitoba |
| Sherry Just | Deborah Hawkshaw | Ellen Redlick | Dallas Gould | Saskatoon, Saskatchewan |
| Tori Koana | Yuna Kotani | Mao Ishigaki | Arisa Kotani | Yamanashi, Japan |
| Beth Peterson | Jenna Loder | Katherine Doerksen | Melissa Gordon | Winnipeg, Manitoba |
| Darcy Robertson | Laura Burtnyk | Gaetanne Gauthier | Krysten Karwacki | Winnipeg, Manitoba |
| Robyn Silvernagle | Stefanie Lawton | Jessie Hunkin | Kara Thevenot | North Battleford, Saskatchewan |
| Kayla Skrlik | Lindsay Makichuk | Brittany Tran | Hope Sunley | Calgary, Alberta |
| Kellie Stiksma | Rhonda Varnes | Ocean Pletz | Bailey Horte | Edmonton, Alberta |
| Kristen Streifel | Kelly Schafer | Kalynn Park | Dayna Demers | Swift Current, Saskatchewan |
| Selena Sturmay | Chantele Broderson | Kate Goodhelpsen | Lauren Marks | Edmonton, Alberta |
| Ashley Thevenot | Rachel Erikson | Paige Engel | Mary Engel | Saskatoon, Saskatchewan |
| Jodi Vaughan | Jody McNabb | Nicole Larson | Valerie Ekelund | Calgary, Alberta |
| Laura Walker | Kate Cameron | Taylor McDonald | Nadine Scotland | Edmonton, Alberta |

== Knockout brackets ==
=== A event ===
First Knockout
(Saskatchewan) Ashley Howard | 6
(Alberta) Selena Sturmay | 5
(Japan) Tori Koana | 6
(Saskatchewan) Ashley Thevenot | 2
(Saskatchewan) Kristen Streifel | 4
(Saskatchewan) Michelle Englot | 8
(Manitoba) Darcy Robertson | 8
(Saskatchewan) Brett Barber | 3

Quarterfinals
(Ontario) Rachel Homan | 7
(Saskatchewan) Ashley Howard | 2
(Alberta) Laura Walker | 3
(Japan) Tori Koana | 10
(Japan) Satsuki Fujisawa | 7
(Saskatchewan) Michelle Englot | 4
(Saskatchewan) Robyn Silvernagle | 6
(Manitoba) Darcy Robertson | 4

Semifinals
(Ontario) Rachel Homan | 9
(Japan) Tori Koana | 3
(Japan) Satsuki Fujisawa | 8
(Saskatchewan) Robyn Silvernagle | 3

Qualifier 1
(Ontario) Rachel Homan | 4
(Japan) Satsuki Fujisawa | 3

First Knockout
(Alberta) Jodi Vaughan | 1
(Alberta) Kayla Skrlik | 7
(Saskatchewan) Amber Holland | 7
(Saskatchewan) Skylar Ackerman | 1
(Saskatchewan) Penny Barker | 3
(Saskatchewan) Sherry Just | 6
(Saskatchewan) Sherry Anderson | 7
(Alberta) Kellie Stiksma | 3

Quarterfinals
(Manitoba) Jennifer Jones | 4
(Alberta) Kayla Skrlik | 10
(British Columbia) Corryn Brown | 8
(Saskatchewan) Amber Holland | 4
(Manitoba) Tracy Fleury | 6
(Saskatchewan) Sherry Just | 3
(Manitoba) Beth Peterson | 5
(Saskatchewan) Sherry Anderson | 6

Semifinals
(Alberta) Kayla Skrlik | 7
(British Columbia) Corryn Brown | 6
(Manitoba) Tracy Fleury | 6
(Saskatchewan) Sherry Anderson | 4

Qualifier 2
(Alberta) Kayla Skrlik | 2
(Manitoba) Tracy Fleury | 3

=== B event ===
Second Knockout
(Alberta) Selena Sturmay | 7
(Saskatchewan) Michelle Englot | 8
(Saskatchewan) Ashley Thevenot | 7
(Manitoba) Darcy Robertson | 8
(Saskatchewan) Kristen Streifel | 3
(Saskatchewan) Ashley Howard | 5
(Saskatchewan) Brett Barber | 4
(Alberta) Laura Walker | 5

Round of 16
(Saskatchewan) Michelle Englot | 5
(Manitoba) Darcy Robertson | 7
(Saskatchewan) Ashley Howard | 5
(Alberta) Laura Walker | 3

Quarterfinals
(Manitoba) Darcy Robertson | 4
(British Columbia) Corryn Brown | 5
(Saskatchewan) Ashley Howard | 2
(Saskatchewan) Sherry Anderson | 7

Semifinals
(British Columbia) Corryn Brown | 5
(Saskatchewan) Sherry Anderson | 3

Qualifier 3
(British Columbia) Corryn Brown | 2
(Japan) Satsuki Fujisawa | 4

Second Knockout
(Alberta) Jodi Vaughan | 7
(Saskatchewan) Sherry Just | 0
(Saskatchewan) Skylar Ackerman | 7
(Manitoba) Beth Peterson | 6
(Saskatchewan) Penny Barker | 4
(Manitoba) Jennifer Jones | 5
(Alberta) Kellie Stiksma | 2
(Saskatchewan) Amber Holland | 7

Round of 16
(Alberta) Jodi Vaughan | 7
(Saskatchewan) Skylar Ackerman | 4
(Manitoba) Jennifer Jones | 8
(Saskatchewan) Amber Holland | 7

Quarterfinals
(Alberta) Jodi Vaughan | 7
(Japan) Tori Koana | 8
(Manitoba) Jennifer Jones | 8
(Saskatchewan) Robyn Silvernagle | 0

Semifinals
(Japan) Tori Koana | 6
(Manitoba) Jennifer Jones | 8

Qualifier 4
(Manitoba) Jennifer Jones | 8
(Alberta) Kayla Skrlik | 4

=== C event ===
Third Knockout
(Alberta) Selena Sturmay | 5
(Saskatchewan) Ashley Thevenot | 1

Quarterfinals
(Saskatchewan) Skylar Ackerman | 4
(Alberta) Selena Sturmay | 6

Semifinals
(Alberta) Selena Sturmay | 5
(Saskatchewan) Robyn Silvernagle | 6

Qualifier 5
(Saskatchewan) Robyn Silvernagle | 1
(Saskatchewan) Sherry Anderson | 4

Third Knockout
(Saskatchewan) Kristen Streifel | 10
(Saskatchewan) Brett Barber | 3

Quarterfinals
(Saskatchewan) Amber Holland | 7
(Saskatchewan) Kristen Streifel | 4

Semifinals
(Saskatchewan) Amber Holland | 7
(Alberta) Jodi Vaughan | 5

Qualifier 6
(Saskatchewan) Amber Holland | 6
(British Columbia) Corryn Brown | 5

Third Knockout
(Saskatchewan) Sherry Just | 2
(Manitoba) Beth Peterson | 6

Quarterfinals
(Saskatchewan) Michelle Englot | 3
(Manitoba) Beth Peterson | 4

Semifinals
(Manitoba) Beth Peterson | 5
(Saskatchewan) Ashley Howard | 4

Qualifier 7
(Manitoba) Beth Peterson | 7
(Alberta) Kayla Skrlik | 4

Third Knockout
(Saskatchewan) Penny Barker | 11
(Alberta) Kellie Stiksma | 2

Quarterfinals
(Alberta) Laura Walker | 2
(Saskatchewan) Penny Barker | 8

Semifinals
(Saskatchewan) Penny Barker | 8
(Manitoba) Darcy Robertson | 7

Qualifier 8
(Saskatchewan) Penny Barker | 3
(Japan) Tori Koana | 7

== Knockout results ==
All draw times listed in Central Standard Time.

=== Draw 1 ===
Friday, September 27, 3:00 pm

| Sheet 1 | 1 | 2 | 3 | 4 | 5 | 6 | 7 | 8 | Final |
| (Saskatchewan) Ashley Howard 🔨 | 0 | 4 | 0 | 1 | 0 | 0 | 1 | 0 | 6 |
| (Alberta) Selena Sturmay | 0 | 0 | 1 | 0 | 2 | 1 | 0 | 1 | 5 |

| Sheet 2 | 1 | 2 | 3 | 4 | 5 | 6 | 7 | 8 | Final |
| (Japan) Tori Koana | 1 | 3 | 0 | 0 | 1 | 0 | 1 | X | 6 |
| (Saskatchewan) Ashley Thevenot 🔨 | 0 | 0 | 0 | 1 | 0 | 1 | 0 | X | 2 |

| Sheet 3 | 1 | 2 | 3 | 4 | 5 | 6 | 7 | 8 | Final |
| (Saskatchewan) Kristen Streifel | 0 | 0 | 3 | 0 | 1 | X | X | X | 4 |
| (Saskatchewan) Michelle Englot 🔨 | 1 | 6 | 0 | 1 | 0 | X | X | X | 8 |

| Sheet 4 | 1 | 2 | 3 | 4 | 5 | 6 | 7 | 8 | Final |
| (Manitoba) Darcy Robertson | 2 | 2 | 0 | 1 | 0 | 3 | X | X | 8 |
| (Saskatchewan) Brett Barber 🔨 | 0 | 0 | 1 | 0 | 2 | 0 | X | X | 3 |

| Sheet 5 | 1 | 2 | 3 | 4 | 5 | 6 | 7 | 8 | Final |
| (Alberta) Jodi Vaughan | 0 | 1 | 0 | 0 | 0 | X | X | X | 1 |
| (Alberta) Kayla Skrlik 🔨 | 1 | 0 | 1 | 3 | 2 | X | X | X | 7 |

| Sheet 6 | 1 | 2 | 3 | 4 | 5 | 6 | 7 | 8 | Final |
| (Saskatchewan) Amber Holland 🔨 | 1 | 2 | 1 | 1 | 0 | 2 | X | X | 7 |
| (Saskatchewan) Skylar Ackerman | 0 | 0 | 0 | 0 | 1 | 0 | X | X | 1 |

| Sheet 7 | 1 | 2 | 3 | 4 | 5 | 6 | 7 | 8 | Final |
| (Saskatchewan) Penny Barker 🔨 | 0 | 0 | 1 | 1 | 0 | 1 | 0 | 0 | 3 |
| (Saskatchewan) Sherry Just | 0 | 0 | 0 | 0 | 1 | 0 | 4 | 1 | 6 |

| Sheet 8 | 1 | 2 | 3 | 4 | 5 | 6 | 7 | 8 | Final |
| (Saskatchewan) Sherry Anderson 🔨 | 0 | 1 | 2 | 0 | 2 | 0 | 2 | X | 7 |
| (Alberta) Kellie Stiksma | 0 | 0 | 0 | 2 | 0 | 1 | 0 | X | 3 |

=== Draw 2 ===
Friday, September 27, 9:15 pm

| Sheet 1 | 1 | 2 | 3 | 4 | 5 | 6 | 7 | 8 | Final |
| (Japan) Satsuki Fujisawa | 2 | 0 | 0 | 0 | 2 | 0 | 2 | 1 | 7 |
| (Saskatchewan) Michelle Englot 🔨 | 0 | 1 | 1 | 0 | 0 | 2 | 0 | 0 | 4 |

| Sheet 2 | 1 | 2 | 3 | 4 | 5 | 6 | 7 | 8 | Final |
| (Saskatchewan) Robyn Silvernagle | 0 | 0 | 2 | 1 | 0 | 0 | 2 | 1 | 6 |
| (Manitoba) Darcy Robertson 🔨 | 2 | 0 | 0 | 0 | 0 | 2 | 0 | 0 | 4 |

| Sheet 3 | 1 | 2 | 3 | 4 | 5 | 6 | 7 | 8 | Final |
| (Ontario) Rachel Homan | 1 | 0 | 0 | 0 | 2 | 3 | 1 | X | 7 |
| (Saskatchewan) Ashley Howard 🔨 | 0 | 1 | 1 | 0 | 0 | 0 | 0 | X | 2 |

| Sheet 4 | 1 | 2 | 3 | 4 | 5 | 6 | 7 | 8 | Final |
| (Alberta) Laura Walker 🔨 | 1 | 0 | 0 | 0 | 2 | 0 | 0 | X | 3 |
| (Japan) Tori Koana | 0 | 2 | 1 | 1 | 0 | 1 | 5 | X | 10 |

| Sheet 5 | 1 | 2 | 3 | 4 | 5 | 6 | 7 | 8 | Final |
| (Manitoba) Tracy Fleury 🔨 | 1 | 0 | 0 | 2 | 0 | 2 | 1 | X | 6 |
| (Saskatchewan) Sherry Just | 0 | 1 | 1 | 0 | 1 | 0 | 0 | X | 3 |

| Sheet 6 | 1 | 2 | 3 | 4 | 5 | 6 | 7 | 8 | 9 | Final |
| (Manitoba) Beth Peterson | 0 | 2 | 0 | 1 | 0 | 1 | 0 | 1 | 0 | 5 |
| (Saskatchewan) Sherry Anderson 🔨 | 1 | 0 | 2 | 0 | 2 | 0 | 0 | 0 | 1 | 6 |

| Sheet 7 | 1 | 2 | 3 | 4 | 5 | 6 | 7 | 8 | Final |
| (Manitoba) Jennifer Jones 🔨 | 2 | 0 | 1 | 1 | 0 | 0 | 0 | X | 4 |
| (Alberta) Kayla Skrlik | 0 | 3 | 0 | 0 | 3 | 2 | 2 | X | 10 |

| Sheet 8 | 1 | 2 | 3 | 4 | 5 | 6 | 7 | 8 | Final |
| (British Columbia) Corryn Brown | 1 | 1 | 0 | 2 | 0 | 0 | 4 | X | 8 |
| (Saskatchewan) Amber Holland 🔨 | 0 | 0 | 2 | 0 | 1 | 1 | 0 | X | 4 |

=== Draw 3 ===
Saturday, September 28, 11:00 am

| Sheet 1 | 1 | 2 | 3 | 4 | 5 | 6 | 7 | 8 | Final |
| (Saskatchewan) Brett Barber 🔨 | 0 | 0 | 1 | 1 | 0 | 0 | 2 | X | 4 |
| (Alberta) Laura Walker | 3 | 1 | 0 | 0 | 0 | 1 | 0 | X | 5 |

| Sheet 2 | 1 | 2 | 3 | 4 | 5 | 6 | 7 | 8 | Final |
| (Saskatchewan) Kristen Streifel | 0 | 1 | 0 | 0 | 1 | 1 | 0 | 0 | 3 |
| (Saskatchewan) Ashley Howard 🔨 | 0 | 0 | 1 | 1 | 0 | 0 | 2 | 1 | 5 |

| Sheet 3 | 1 | 2 | 3 | 4 | 5 | 6 | 7 | 8 | 9 | Final |
| (Saskatchewan) Ashley Thevenot 🔨 | 0 | 3 | 0 | 3 | 0 | 1 | 0 | 0 | 0 | 7 |
| (Manitoba) Darcy Robertson | 1 | 0 | 2 | 0 | 1 | 0 | 2 | 1 | 1 | 8 |

| Sheet 4 | 1 | 2 | 3 | 4 | 5 | 6 | 7 | 8 | 9 | Final |
| (Alberta) Selena Sturmay | 1 | 0 | 0 | 1 | 0 | 3 | 0 | 2 | 0 | 7 |
| (Saskatchewan) Michelle Englot 🔨 | 0 | 0 | 3 | 0 | 2 | 0 | 2 | 0 | 1 | 8 |

| Sheet 5 | 1 | 2 | 3 | 4 | 5 | 6 | 7 | 8 | Final |
| (Alberta) Kellie Stiksma | 1 | 0 | 0 | 0 | 0 | 1 | 0 | X | 2 |
| (Saskatchewan) Amber Holland 🔨 | 0 | 0 | 0 | 4 | 1 | 0 | 2 | X | 7 |

| Sheet 6 | 1 | 2 | 3 | 4 | 5 | 6 | 7 | 8 | 9 | Final |
| (Saskatchewan) Penny Barker | 1 | 0 | 0 | 0 | 1 | 0 | 1 | 1 | 0 | 4 |
| (Manitoba) Jennifer Jones 🔨 | 0 | 2 | 0 | 1 | 0 | 1 | 0 | 0 | 1 | 5 |

| Sheet 7 | 1 | 2 | 3 | 4 | 5 | 6 | 7 | 8 | Final |
| (Saskatchewan) Skylar Ackerman | 0 | 1 | 0 | 2 | 0 | 0 | 3 | 1 | 7 |
| (Manitoba) Beth Peterson 🔨 | 2 | 0 | 2 | 0 | 1 | 1 | 0 | 0 | 6 |

| Sheet 8 | 1 | 2 | 3 | 4 | 5 | 6 | 7 | 8 | Final |
| (Alberta) Jodi Vaughan 🔨 | 3 | 3 | 1 | X | X | X | X | X | 7 |
| (Saskatchewan) Sherry Just | 0 | 0 | 0 | X | X | X | X | X | 0 |

=== Draw 4 ===
Saturday, September 28, 3:00 pm

| Sheet 1 | 1 | 2 | 3 | 4 | 5 | 6 | 7 | 8 | Final |
| (Alberta) Jodi Vaughan 🔨 | 1 | 2 | 1 | 0 | 1 | 2 | 0 | X | 7 |
| (Saskatchewan) Skylar Ackerman | 0 | 0 | 0 | 3 | 0 | 0 | 1 | X | 4 |

| Sheet 2 | 1 | 2 | 3 | 4 | 5 | 6 | 7 | 8 | 9 | Final |
| (Manitoba) Jennifer Jones | 0 | 4 | 0 | 0 | 2 | 0 | 0 | 1 | 1 | 8 |
| (Saskatchewan) Amber Holland 🔨 | 1 | 0 | 1 | 2 | 0 | 2 | 1 | 0 | 0 | 7 |

| Sheet 3 | 1 | 2 | 3 | 4 | 5 | 6 | 7 | 8 | 9 | Final |
| (Alberta) Kayla Skrlik 🔨 | 0 | 2 | 0 | 2 | 0 | 2 | 0 | 0 | 1 | 7 |
| (British Columbia) Corryn Brown | 0 | 0 | 1 | 0 | 1 | 0 | 3 | 1 | 0 | 6 |

| Sheet 4 | 1 | 2 | 3 | 4 | 5 | 6 | 7 | 8 | Final |
| (Manitoba) Tracy Fleury | 0 | 1 | 3 | 1 | 1 | 0 | X | X | 6 |
| (Saskatchewan) Sherry Anderson 🔨 | 2 | 0 | 0 | 0 | 0 | 2 | X | X | 4 |

| Sheet 5 | 1 | 2 | 3 | 4 | 5 | 6 | 7 | 8 | Final |
| (Ontario) Rachel Homan 🔨 | 4 | 0 | 3 | 0 | 2 | X | X | X | 9 |
| (Japan) Tori Koana | 0 | 2 | 0 | 1 | 0 | X | X | X | 3 |

| Sheet 6 | 1 | 2 | 3 | 4 | 5 | 6 | 7 | 8 | Final |
| (Japan) Satsuki Fujisawa | 0 | 0 | 2 | 5 | 0 | 1 | X | X | 8 |
| (Saskatchewan) Robyn Silvernagle 🔨 | 1 | 1 | 0 | 0 | 1 | 0 | X | X | 3 |

| Sheet 7 | 1 | 2 | 3 | 4 | 5 | 6 | 7 | 8 | Final |
| (Saskatchewan) Michelle Englot 🔨 | 0 | 0 | 0 | 3 | 0 | 1 | 0 | 1 | 5 |
| (Manitoba) Darcy Robertson | 0 | 0 | 3 | 0 | 3 | 0 | 1 | 0 | 7 |

| Sheet 8 | 1 | 2 | 3 | 4 | 5 | 6 | 7 | 8 | Final |
| (Saskatchewan) Ashley Howard | 0 | 2 | 0 | 1 | 1 | 0 | 0 | 1 | 5 |
| (Alberta) Laura Walker 🔨 | 0 | 0 | 2 | 0 | 0 | 1 | 0 | 0 | 3 |

=== Draw 5 ===
Saturday, September 28, 7:00 pm

| Sheet 1 | 1 | 2 | 3 | 4 | 5 | 6 | 7 | 8 | Final |
| (Saskatchewan) Sherry Just 🔨 | 1 | 0 | 0 | 0 | 1 | 0 | X | X | 2 |
| (Manitoba) Beth Peterson | 0 | 2 | 1 | 2 | 0 | 1 | X | X | 6 |

| Sheet 2 | 1 | 2 | 3 | 4 | 5 | 6 | 7 | 8 | 9 | Final |
| (Alberta) Jodi Vaughan 🔨 | 2 | 0 | 1 | 0 | 3 | 0 | 0 | 1 | 0 | 7 |
| (Japan) Tori Koana | 0 | 3 | 0 | 1 | 0 | 2 | 1 | 0 | 1 | 8 |

| Sheet 3 | 1 | 2 | 3 | 4 | 5 | 6 | 7 | 8 | Final |
| (Manitoba) Jennifer Jones 🔨 | 0 | 1 | 1 | 3 | 3 | X | X | X | 8 |
| (Saskatchewan) Robyn Silvernagle | 0 | 0 | 0 | 0 | 0 | X | X | X | 0 |

| Sheet 4 | 1 | 2 | 3 | 4 | 5 | 6 | 7 | 8 | Final |
| (Alberta) Selena Sturmay | 1 | 1 | 0 | 2 | 0 | 1 | X | X | 5 |
| (Saskatchewan) Ashley Thevenot 🔨 | 0 | 0 | 0 | 0 | 1 | 0 | X | X | 1 |

| Sheet 5 | 1 | 2 | 3 | 4 | 5 | 6 | 7 | 8 | Final |
| (Manitoba) Darcy Robertson 🔨 | 0 | 0 | 2 | 0 | 1 | 0 | 0 | 1 | 4 |
| (British Columbia) Corryn Brown | 0 | 1 | 0 | 1 | 0 | 3 | 0 | 0 | 5 |

| Sheet 6 | 1 | 2 | 3 | 4 | 5 | 6 | 7 | 8 | Final |
| (Saskatchewan) Penny Barker | 1 | 2 | 0 | 1 | 0 | 2 | 5 | X | 11 |
| (Alberta) Kellie Stiksma 🔨 | 0 | 0 | 2 | 0 | 0 | 0 | 0 | X | 2 |

| Sheet 7 | 1 | 2 | 3 | 4 | 5 | 6 | 7 | 8 | Final |
| (Saskatchewan) Ashley Howard | 0 | 0 | 2 | 0 | 0 | X | X | X | 2 |
| (Saskatchewan) Sherry Anderson 🔨 | 0 | 2 | 0 | 3 | 2 | X | X | X | 7 |

| Sheet 8 | 1 | 2 | 3 | 4 | 5 | 6 | 7 | 8 | Final |
| (Saskatchewan) Kristen Streifel 🔨 | 2 | 0 | 4 | 1 | 0 | 3 | X | X | 10 |
| (Saskatchewan) Brett Barber | 0 | 1 | 0 | 0 | 2 | 0 | X | X | 3 |

=== Draw 6 ===
Sunday, September 29, 10:00 am

| Sheet 1 | 1 | 2 | 3 | 4 | 5 | 6 | 7 | 8 | 9 | Final |
| (British Columbia) Corryn Brown | 0 | 0 | 0 | 1 | 1 | 0 | 0 | 1 | 2 | 5 |
| (Saskatchewan) Sherry Anderson 🔨 | 0 | 1 | 0 | 0 | 0 | 1 | 1 | 0 | 0 | 3 |

| Sheet 2 | 1 | 2 | 3 | 4 | 5 | 6 | 7 | 8 | Final |
| (Alberta) Kayla Skrlik 🔨 | 0 | 1 | 0 | 0 | 0 | 0 | 1 | X | 2 |
| (Manitoba) Tracy Fleury | 2 | 0 | 0 | 0 | 0 | 1 | 0 | X | 3 |

| Sheet 3 | 1 | 2 | 3 | 4 | 5 | 6 | 7 | 8 | Final |
| (Alberta) Laura Walker | 0 | 0 | 0 | 2 | 0 | 0 | X | X | 2 |
| (Saskatchewan) Penny Barker 🔨 | 1 | 2 | 1 | 0 | 2 | 2 | X | X | 8 |

| Sheet 4 | 1 | 2 | 3 | 4 | 5 | 6 | 7 | 8 | Final |
| (Saskatchewan) Amber Holland | 1 | 0 | 1 | 0 | 4 | 0 | 1 | X | 7 |
| (Saskatchewan) Kristen Streifel 🔨 | 0 | 1 | 0 | 2 | 0 | 1 | 0 | X | 4 |

| Sheet 5 | 1 | 2 | 3 | 4 | 5 | 6 | 7 | 8 | Final |
| (Saskatchewan) Michelle Englot | 0 | 1 | 0 | 1 | 0 | 0 | 1 | 0 | 3 |
| (Manitoba) Beth Peterson 🔨 | 1 | 0 | 1 | 0 | 0 | 1 | 0 | 1 | 4 |

| Sheet 6 | 1 | 2 | 3 | 4 | 5 | 6 | 7 | 8 | Final |
| (Saskatchewan) Skylar Ackerman 🔨 | 0 | 1 | 1 | 1 | 0 | 1 | 0 | 0 | 4 |
| (Alberta) Selena Sturmay | 0 | 0 | 0 | 0 | 1 | 0 | 1 | 4 | 6 |

| Sheet 7 | 1 | 2 | 3 | 4 | 5 | 6 | 7 | 8 | 9 | Final |
| (Ontario) Rachel Homan | 0 | 1 | 1 | 0 | 0 | 1 | 0 | 0 | 1 | 4 |
| (Japan) Satsuki Fujisawa 🔨 | 1 | 0 | 0 | 1 | 0 | 0 | 0 | 1 | 0 | 3 |

| Sheet 8 | 1 | 2 | 3 | 4 | 5 | 6 | 7 | 8 | Final |
| (Japan) Tori Koana | 0 | 3 | 0 | 1 | 1 | 0 | 1 | 0 | 6 |
| (Manitoba) Jennifer Jones 🔨 | 2 | 0 | 1 | 0 | 0 | 2 | 0 | 3 | 8 |

=== Draw 7 ===
Sunday, September 29, 2:00 pm

| Sheet 2 | 1 | 2 | 3 | 4 | 5 | 6 | 7 | 8 | Final |
| (Manitoba) Beth Peterson 🔨 | 0 | 1 | 0 | 1 | 0 | 2 | 0 | 1 | 5 |
| (Saskatchewan) Ashley Howard | 0 | 0 | 1 | 0 | 2 | 0 | 1 | 0 | 4 |

| Sheet 3 | 1 | 2 | 3 | 4 | 5 | 6 | 7 | 8 | Final |
| (British Columbia) Corryn Brown 🔨 | 0 | 0 | 0 | 1 | 0 | 0 | 1 | X | 2 |
| (Japan) Satsuki Fujisawa | 0 | 1 | 1 | 0 | 1 | 1 | 0 | X | 4 |

| Sheet 4 | 1 | 2 | 3 | 4 | 5 | 6 | 7 | 8 | Final |
| (Alberta) Selena Sturmay 🔨 | 0 | 3 | 0 | 1 | 0 | 1 | 0 | 0 | 5 |
| (Saskatchewan) Robyn Silvernagle | 0 | 0 | 3 | 0 | 0 | 0 | 2 | 1 | 6 |

| Sheet 5 | 1 | 2 | 3 | 4 | 5 | 6 | 7 | 8 | Final |
| (Manitoba) Jennifer Jones 🔨 | 1 | 0 | 3 | 0 | 1 | 0 | 2 | 1 | 8 |
| (Alberta) Kayla Skrlik | 0 | 1 | 0 | 1 | 0 | 2 | 0 | 0 | 4 |

| Sheet 6 | 1 | 2 | 3 | 4 | 5 | 6 | 7 | 8 | Final |
| (Saskatchewan) Amber Holland | 0 | 2 | 0 | 0 | 2 | 0 | 2 | 1 | 7 |
| (Alberta) Jodi Vaughan 🔨 | 2 | 0 | 2 | 0 | 0 | 1 | 0 | 0 | 5 |

| Sheet 7 | 1 | 2 | 3 | 4 | 5 | 6 | 7 | 8 | Final |
| (Saskatchewan) Penny Barker | 0 | 1 | 1 | 0 | 3 | 2 | 0 | 1 | 8 |
| (Manitoba) Darcy Robertson 🔨 | 4 | 0 | 0 | 1 | 0 | 0 | 2 | 0 | 7 |

=== Draw 8 ===
Sunday, September 29, 6:00 pm

| Sheet 2 | 1 | 2 | 3 | 4 | 5 | 6 | 7 | 8 | Final |
| (Saskatchewan) Robyn Silvernagle | 0 | 0 | 0 | 0 | 1 | 0 | 0 | 0 | 1 |
| (Saskatchewan) Sherry Anderson 🔨 | 0 | 0 | 1 | 0 | 0 | 0 | 2 | 1 | 4 |

| Sheet 3 | 1 | 2 | 3 | 4 | 5 | 6 | 7 | 8 | Final |
| (Manitoba) Beth Peterson | 2 | 0 | 0 | 1 | 3 | 0 | 0 | 1 | 7 |
| (Alberta) Kayla Skrlik 🔨 | 0 | 1 | 1 | 0 | 0 | 1 | 1 | 0 | 4 |

| Sheet 4 | 1 | 2 | 3 | 4 | 5 | 6 | 7 | 8 | Final |
| (Saskatchewan) Penny Barker 🔨 | 1 | 0 | 0 | 0 | 0 | 2 | 0 | X | 3 |
| (Japan) Tori Koana | 0 | 2 | 0 | 3 | 1 | 0 | 1 | X | 7 |

| Sheet 5 | 1 | 2 | 3 | 4 | 5 | 6 | 7 | 8 | 9 | Final |
| (Saskatchewan) Amber Holland 🔨 | 0 | 1 | 3 | 0 | 1 | 0 | 0 | 0 | 1 | 6 |
| (British Columbia) Corryn Brown | 0 | 0 | 0 | 1 | 0 | 2 | 1 | 1 | 0 | 5 |

== Playoffs ==
Quarterfinals
A1 | (Ontario) Rachel Homan | 3
C4 | (Japan) Tori Koana | 2
B1 | (Japan) Satsuki Fujisawa | 6
C1 | (Saskatchewan) Sherry Anderson | 9
A2 | (Manitoba) Tracy Fleury | 5
C2 | (Saskatchewan) Amber Holland | 4
B2 | (Manitoba) Jennifer Jones | 6
C3 | (Manitoba) Beth Peterson | 5

Semifinals
A1 | (Ontario) Rachel Homan | 6
C1 | (Saskatchewan) Sherry Anderson | 4
A2 | (Manitoba) Tracy Fleury | 3
B1 | (Manitoba) Jennifer Jones | 2

Final
A1 | (Ontario) Rachel Homan | 8
A2 | (Manitoba) Tracy Fleury | 3

=== Quarterfinals ===
Monday, September 30, 9:00 am

| Sheet 2 | 1 | 2 | 3 | 4 | 5 | 6 | 7 | 8 | Final |
| (Ontario) Rachel Homan 🔨 | 0 | 0 | 0 | 1 | 1 | 0 | 0 | 1 | 3 |
| (Japan) Tori Koana | 0 | 1 | 0 | 0 | 0 | 1 | 0 | 0 | 2 |

| Sheet 3 | 1 | 2 | 3 | 4 | 5 | 6 | 7 | 8 | Final |
| (Manitoba) Tracy Fleury 🔨 | 0 | 0 | 2 | 0 | 2 | 0 | 0 | 1 | 5 |
| (Saskatchewan) Amber Holland | 0 | 1 | 0 | 1 | 0 | 2 | 0 | 0 | 4 |

| Sheet 6 | 1 | 2 | 3 | 4 | 5 | 6 | 7 | 8 | Final |
| (Manitoba) Jennifer Jones 🔨 | 3 | 1 | 0 | 1 | 0 | 0 | 0 | 1 | 6 |
| (Manitoba) Beth Peterson | 0 | 0 | 1 | 0 | 3 | 1 | 0 | 0 | 5 |

| Sheet 7 | 1 | 2 | 3 | 4 | 5 | 6 | 7 | 8 | Final |
| (Japan) Satsuki Fujisawa 🔨 | 2 | 0 | 3 | 0 | 0 | 0 | 1 | X | 6 |
| (Saskatchewan) Sherry Anderson | 0 | 1 | 0 | 3 | 3 | 2 | 0 | X | 9 |

=== Semifinals ===
Monday, September 30, 12:00 pm

| Sheet 3 | 1 | 2 | 3 | 4 | 5 | 6 | 7 | 8 | Final |
| (Ontario) Rachel Homan 🔨 | 0 | 0 | 1 | 0 | 2 | 2 | 1 | X | 6 |
| (Saskatchewan) Sherry Anderson | 0 | 1 | 0 | 3 | 0 | 0 | 0 | X | 4 |

| Sheet 5 | 1 | 2 | 3 | 4 | 5 | 6 | 7 | 8 | Final |
| (Manitoba) Tracy Fleury 🔨 | 0 | 0 | 0 | 1 | 0 | 1 | 0 | 1 | 3 |
| (Manitoba) Jennifer Jones | 0 | 0 | 0 | 0 | 1 | 0 | 1 | 0 | 2 |

=== Final ===
Monday, September 30, 3:00 pm

| Sheet 4 | 1 | 2 | 3 | 4 | 5 | 6 | 7 | 8 | Final |
| (Ontario) Rachel Homan 🔨 | 0 | 4 | 0 | 0 | 2 | 2 | X | X | 8 |
| (Manitoba) Tracy Fleury | 0 | 0 | 2 | 1 | 0 | 0 | X | X | 3 |
