= 2024 Curlers Corner Autumn Gold Curling Classic =

- Host city: Calgary, Alberta
- Arena: Calgary Curling Club
- Dates: October 11–14
- Winner: (South Korea) Team Gim
- Curling club: Uijeongbu CC, Uijeongbu
- Skip: Gim Eun-ji
- Third: Kim Min-ji
- Second: Kim Su-ji
- Lead: Seol Ye-eun
- Alternate: Seol Ye-ji
- Coach: Shin Dong-ho
- Finalist: (China) Wang Rui

The 2024 Curlers Corner Autumn Gold Curling Classic was held from October 11 to 14 at the Calgary Curling Club in Calgary, Alberta. The event was held in a triple-knockout format with a purse of $45,000.

== Teams ==
The teams are listed as follows:

Skip	Third	Second	Lead	Alternate	Locale
Ryleigh Bakker	Stephanie Todd	Sara Therrien	Renee Michaud		Calgary, Alberta
Claire Booth	Jamie Scott	Sydney Libbus	Sophie Brissette		Edmonton, Alberta
Corryn Brown	Erin Pincott	Sarah Koltun	Samantha Fisher		Kamloops, British Columbia
Stefania Constantini	Elena Mathis	Angela Romei	Giulia Zardini Lacedelli	Marta Lo Deserto	Cortina d'Ampezzo, Italy
Betti Delorey	Halli-Rai Delorey	Makayla Cook	Tyanna Bain		Hay River, Northwest Territories
Keelie Duncan	Ava Koe	Elizabeth Morgan	Carley Hardie		Calgary, Alberta
Satsuki Fujisawa	Chinami Yoshida	Yumi Suzuki	Yurika Yoshida		Kitami, Japan
Gim Eun-ji	Kim Min-ji	Kim Su-ji	Seol Ye-eun	Seol Ye-ji	Uijeongbu, South Korea
Serena Gray-Withers	Catherine Clifford	Lindsey Burgess	Zoe Cinnamon		Edmonton, Alberta
Ha Seung-youn	Kim Hye-rin	Yang Tae-i	Kim Su-jin	Park Seo-jin	Chuncheon, South Korea
Kang Bo-bae	Jeong Jae-hee	Kim Min-seo	Kim Ji-soo		Jeonbuk, South Korea
Selena Njegovan	Jocelyn Peterman	Becca Hebert (Note: Alternate Becca Hebert spared for Kaitlyn Lawes who was on maternity leave. She played second while Jocelyn Peterman and Selena Njegovan moved up to third and skip respectively.)	Kristin Gordon		Winnipeg, Manitoba
Kaylee McNamee	Sarah McKinnon	Emily Hoggard	Sarah Guina		Calgary, Alberta
Misaki Tanaka (Fourth)	Miori Nakamura (Skip)	Haruka Kihara	Hiyori Ichinohe	Yuuna Harada	Aomori, Japan
Park You-been	Lee Eun-chae	Kim Ji-yoon	Yang Seung-hee		Seoul, South Korea
Beth Peterson	Kelsey Calvert	Katherine Remillard	Allie Iskiw (Note: Allie Iskiw spared for Melissa Gordon-Kurz.)		Winnipeg, Manitoba
Hannah Phillips	Kate Goodhelpsen	Anna Munroe	Sasha Tran		Edmonton, Alberta
Kayleigh Shannon	Shianna Lind	Madison Milot	Irelande McMahon		Calgary, Alberta
Robyn Silvernagle	Jessie Hunkin	Jessie Haughian	Kristie Moore		Sexsmith, Alberta
Kayla Skrlik	Margot Flemming	Ashton Skrlik	Geri-Lynn Ramsay		Calgary, Alberta
Kellie Stiksma	Nicole Mattson	Joanne Tarvit	Payton Sonnenberg		Sherwood Park, Alberta
Selena Sturmay	Danielle Schmiemann	Dezaray Hawes	Paige Papley		Edmonton, Alberta
Momoha Tabata (Fourth)	Sae Yamamoto (Skip) (Note: Sae Yamamoto skipped Team Tabata.)	Miku Nihira	Mikoto Nakajima	Ayami Ito	Sapporo, Japan
Ashley Thevenot	Brittany Tran	Taylor Stremick	Kaylin Skinner		Saskatoon, Saskatchewan
Miyu Ueno	Asuka Kanai	Junko Nishimuro	Yui Ueno	Mone Ryokawa	Karuizawa, Japan
Wang Rui	Han Yu	Dong Ziqi	Jiang Jiayi	Su Tingyu	Beijing, China
Kristy Watling	Laura Burtnyk	Emily Deschenes	Sarah Pyke		Winnipeg, Manitoba
Sayaka Yoshimura	Yuna Kotani	Kaho Onodera	Anna Ohmiya	Mina Kobayashi	Sapporo, Japan

== Knockout Brackets ==
=== A Event ===
First Knockout	Qualifier 1
(Italy) Stefania Constantini	3
(Manitoba) Kristy Watling	4	(British Columbia) Corryn Brown	5
(British Columbia) Corryn Brown	7	(British Columbia) Corryn Brown	4
(Japan) Miyu Ueno	9	(Japan) Miyu Ueno	7
(Alberta) Keelie Duncan	3	(Japan) Miyu Ueno	8
(Japan) Sayaka Yoshimura	6	(Japan) Sayaka Yoshimura	4
(Alberta) Kaylee McNamee	3	(Japan) Miyu Ueno	10
(Alberta) Kayla Skrlik	3
(Japan) Satsuki Fujisawa	6
(China) Wang Rui	8	(China) Wang Rui	5
(South Korea) Park You-been	7	(Japan) Satsuki Fujisawa	2
(Japan) Team Tabata	10	(Alberta) Kayla Skrlik	8
(Alberta) Kellie Stiksma	3	(Japan) Team Tabata	4
(Alberta) Kayla Skrlik	8	(Alberta) Kayla Skrlik	7
(Alberta) Kayleigh Shannon	3

First Knockout	Qualifier 2
(South Korea) Gim Eun-ji	10
(Japan) Miori Nakamura	5	(Alberta) Claire Booth	2
(Alberta) Claire Booth	6	(South Korea) Gim Eun-ji	6
(Manitoba) Beth Peterson	6	(Manitoba) Beth Peterson	7
(Alberta) Robyn Silvernagle	2	(Manitoba) Beth Peterson	4
(South Korea) Ha Seung-youn	7	(Alberta) Ryleigh Bakker	1
(Alberta) Ryleigh Bakker	8	(Manitoba) Beth Peterson	6
(South Korea) Kang Bo-bae	2
(Manitoba) Team Lawes	8
(Saskatchewan) Ashley Thevenot	8	(Saskatchewan) Ashley Thevenot	5
(Alberta) Hannah Phillips	2	(Manitoba) Team Lawes	4
(Alberta) Serena Gray-Withers	3	(South Korea) Kang Bo-bae	5
(South Korea) Kang Bo-bae	8	(South Korea) Kang Bo-bae	5
(Alberta) Selena Sturmay	10	(Alberta) Selena Sturmay	3
(Northwest Territories) Betti Delorey	1

=== B Event ===
Second Knockout	To Qualifier 3
(Manitoba) Kristy Watling	2
(China) Wang Rui	6
(China) Wang Rui	4
(South Korea) Gim Eun-ji	3
(China) Wang Rui	7
(Manitoba) Team Lawes	1
(Japan) Team Tabata	5
(Alberta) Keelie Duncan	11	(Alberta) Keelie Duncan	3
(Alberta) Kaylee McNamee	5	(Japan) Team Tabata	5	Qualifier 3
(Manitoba) Team Lawes	6
(China) Wang Rui	2
(Alberta) Kayla Skrlik	7

Second Knockout	To Qualifier 3
(South Korea) Park You-been	9
(Italy) Stefania Constantini	3
(South Korea) Park You-been	6
(Japan) Sayaka Yoshimura	4
(Japan) Sayaka Yoshimura	7
(Alberta) Kellie Stiksma	5	(Alberta) Kayleigh Shannon	3
(Alberta) Kayleigh Shannon	7	(South Korea) Park You-been	6
(Alberta) Kayla Skrlik	8

Second Knockout	To Qualifier 4
(Japan) Miori Nakamura	3
(Saskatchewan) Ashley Thevenot	8
(Saskatchewan) Ashley Thevenot	4
(British Columbia) Corryn Brown	6
(British Columbia) Corryn Brown	4
(Japan) Satsuki Fujisawa	7
(Alberta) Selena Sturmay	10
(Alberta) Robyn Silvernagle	8	(Alberta) Robyn Silvernagle	3
(South Korea) Ha Seung-youn	4	(Alberta) Selena Sturmay	4	Qualifier 4
(Japan) Satsuki Fujisawa	6
(Japan) Satsuki Fujisawa	7
(South Korea) Kang Bo-bae	5

Second Knockout	To Qualifier 4
(Alberta) Hannah Phillips	7
(Alberta) Claire Booth	6
(Alberta) Hannah Phillips	6
(Alberta) Ryleigh Bakker	5
(Alberta) Ryleigh Bakker	5
(Alberta) Serena Gray-Withers	6	(Alberta) Serena Gray-Withers	4
(Northwest Territories) Betti Delorey	3	(Alberta) Hannah Phillips	3
(South Korea) Kang Bo-bae	7

=== C Event ===
Third Knockout	Qualifier 5
(Saskatchewan) Ashley Thevenot	2
(Alberta) Selena Sturmay	8
(Alberta) Selena Sturmay	12
(Alberta) Ryleigh Bakker	1
(Alberta) Ryleigh Bakker	6
(Alberta) Kaylee McNamee	4	(Alberta) Kellie Stiksma	5
(Alberta) Kellie Stiksma	6	(Alberta) Selena Sturmay	5
(China) Wang Rui	6

Third Knockout	Qualifier 6
(Alberta) Claire Booth	4
(Alberta) Serena Gray-Withers	7	(Alberta) Serena Gray-Withers	7
(South Korea) Park You-been	6
(Alberta) Serena Gray-Withers	2
(Japan) Miori Nakamura	3	(Alberta) Robyn Silvernagle	8
(Alberta) Robyn Silvernagle	6	(Alberta) Robyn Silvernagle	3
(Manitoba) Team Lawes	2

Third Knockout	Qualifier 7
(Italy) Stefania Constantini	9
(Alberta) Kayleigh Shannon	2	(Italy) Stefania Constantini	8
(Alberta) Hannah Phillips	0
(Italy) Stefania Constantini	0
(Manitoba) Kristy Watling	4	(British Columbia) Corryn Brown	8
(Alberta) Keelie Duncan	6	(Alberta) Keelie Duncan	2
(British Columbia) Corryn Brown	9

Third Knockout	Qualifier 8
(Japan) Sayaka Yoshimura	5
(South Korea) Ha Seung-youn	11	(South Korea) Ha Seung-youn	3
(Northwest Territories) Betti Delorey	5	(Japan) Sayaka Yoshimura	3
(South Korea) Gim Eun-ji	4
(South Korea) Gim Eun-ji	7
(Japan) Team Tabata	2
(South Korea) Gim Eun-ji	6
(South Korea) Kang Bo-bae	3

== Knockout Results ==
All draw times listed in Mountain Daylight Time (UTC-06:00).

=== Draw 1 ===
Friday, October 11, 9:00 am

Sheet 1	1	2	3	4	5	6	7	8	Final
(China) Wang Rui	0	0	3	0	2	0	3	0	8
(South Korea) Park You-been 🔨	0	2	0	2	0	2	0	1	7

Sheet 2	1	2	3	4	5	6	7	8	Final
(Japan) Sayaka Yoshimura	0	2	2	1	0	1	0	X	6
(Alberta) Kaylee McNamee 🔨	1	0	0	0	1	0	1	X	3

Sheet 4	1	2	3	4	5	6	7	8	Final
(Japan) Miyu Ueno 🔨	2	3	0	2	0	2	X	X	9
(Alberta) Keelie Duncan	0	0	2	0	1	0	X	X	3

Sheet 5	1	2	3	4	5	6	7	8	Final
(Manitoba) Kristy Watling	0	1	0	2	0	0	1	X	4
(British Columbia) Corryn Brown 🔨	3	0	2	0	1	1	0	X	7

Sheet 6	1	2	3	4	5	6	7	8	Final
(Alberta) Kayla Skrlik 🔨	2	3	0	0	2	1	X	X	8
(Alberta) Kayleigh Shannon	0	0	2	1	0	0	X	X	3

Sheet 7	1	2	3	4	5	6	7	8	Final
(Japan) Team Tabata 🔨	0	2	0	4	0	4	X	X	10
(Alberta) Kellie Stiksma	0	0	1	0	2	0	X	X	3

=== Draw 2 ===
Friday, October 11, 12:45 pm

Sheet 1	1	2	3	4	5	6	7	8	Final
(Alberta) Selena Sturmay 🔨	4	2	0	0	3	0	1	X	10
(Northwest Territories) Betti Delorey	0	0	0	0	0	1	0	X	1

Sheet 2	1	2	3	4	5	6	7	8	Final
(Alberta) Serena Gray-Withers	0	0	0	3	0	0	0	X	3
(South Korea) Kang Bo-bae 🔨	0	2	2	0	0	3	1	X	8

Sheet 3	1	2	3	4	5	6	7	8	Final
(Saskatchewan) Ashley Thevenot 🔨	0	3	1	0	3	1	X	X	8
(Alberta) Hannah Phillips	1	0	0	1	0	0	X	X	2

Sheet 4	1	2	3	4	5	6	7	8	Final
(South Korea) Ha Seung-youn 🔨	0	0	2	0	4	1	0	0	7
(Alberta) Ryleigh Bakker	0	2	0	3	0	0	2	1	8

Sheet 5	1	2	3	4	5	6	7	8	Final
(Manitoba) Beth Peterson	0	1	0	1	1	2	1	X	6
(Alberta) Robyn Silvernagle 🔨	1	0	1	0	0	0	0	X	2

Sheet 6	1	2	3	4	5	6	7	8	9	Final
(Japan) Miori Nakamura	0	0	2	0	2	0	1	0	0	5
(Alberta) Claire Booth 🔨	0	1	0	1	0	2	0	1	1	6

=== Draw 3 ===
Friday, October 11, 4:30 pm

Sheet 2	1	2	3	4	5	6	7	8	Final
(Japan) Team Tabata	0	0	2	0	1	1	0	X	4
(Alberta) Kayla Skrlik 🔨	0	4	0	1	0	0	2	X	7

Sheet 3	1	2	3	4	5	6	7	8	Final
(Alberta) Keelie Duncan	0	1	0	2	1	3	4	X	11
(Alberta) Kaylee McNamee 🔨	2	0	3	0	0	0	0	X	5

Sheet 4	1	2	3	4	5	6	7	8	Final
(Alberta) Kellie Stiksma	2	0	1	0	0	0	2	0	5
(Alberta) Kayleigh Shannon 🔨	0	1	0	1	1	2	0	2	7

Sheet 5	1	2	3	4	5	6	7	8	Final
(Japan) Satsuki Fujisawa 🔨	0	0	3	0	1	1	0	1	6
(China) Wang Rui	1	0	0	2	0	0	2	0	5

Sheet 6	1	2	3	4	5	6	7	8	Final
(Japan) Miyu Ueno 🔨	1	0	0	2	0	0	3	2	8
(Japan) Sayaka Yoshimura	0	0	2	0	0	2	0	0	4

Sheet 7	1	2	3	4	5	6	7	8	Final
(Italy) Stefania Constantini 🔨	0	0	1	0	2	0	0	0	3
(British Columbia) Corryn Brown	1	0	0	1	0	1	1	1	5

=== Draw 4 ===
Friday, October 11, 8:15 pm

Sheet 2	1	2	3	4	5	6	7	8	Final
(South Korea) Gim Eun-ji 🔨	3	4	3	0	X	X	X	X	10
(Alberta) Claire Booth	0	0	0	2	X	X	X	X	2

Sheet 3	1	2	3	4	5	6	7	8	Final
(South Korea) Kang Bo-bae	0	1	2	0	2	0	0	X	5
(Alberta) Selena Sturmay 🔨	0	0	0	1	0	1	1	X	3

Sheet 4	1	2	3	4	5	6	7	8	Final
(Alberta) Serena Gray-Withers	1	1	0	2	2	0	0	X	6
(Northwest Territories) Betti Delorey 🔨	0	0	1	0	0	1	1	X	3

Sheet 5	1	2	3	4	5	6	7	8	Final
(Manitoba) Team Lawes	0	0	1	2	1	1	0	3	8
(Saskatchewan) Ashley Thevenot 🔨	1	1	0	0	0	0	3	0	5

Sheet 6	1	2	3	4	5	6	7	8	Final
(Manitoba) Beth Peterson 🔨	2	0	1	1	0	0	0	X	4
(Alberta) Ryleigh Bakker	0	0	0	0	1	0	0	X	1

Sheet 7	1	2	3	4	5	6	7	8	Final
(Alberta) Robyn Silvernagle	0	1	3	0	1	0	3	X	8
(South Korea) Ha Seung-youn 🔨	1	0	0	1	0	2	0	X	4

=== Draw 5 ===
Saturday, October 12, 9:00 am

Sheet 1	1	2	3	4	5	6	7	8	Final
(Japan) Sayaka Yoshimura 🔨	2	0	2	1	0	0	2	X	7
(Alberta) Kayleigh Shannon	0	2	0	0	1	0	0	X	3

Sheet 2	1	2	3	4	5	6	7	8	Final
(Manitoba) Kristy Watling 🔨	0	1	0	0	0	1	0	0	2
(China) Wang Rui	0	0	0	3	1	0	1	1	6

Sheet 3	1	2	3	4	5	6	7	8	Final
(British Columbia) Corryn Brown	0	1	1	0	1	0	1	0	4
(Japan) Miyu Ueno 🔨	3	0	0	1	0	2	0	1	7

Sheet 5	1	2	3	4	5	6	7	8	Final
(South Korea) Park You-been 🔨	0	3	0	0	3	0	3	X	9
(Italy) Stefania Constantini	0	0	1	1	0	1	0	X	3

Sheet 6	1	2	3	4	5	6	7	8	Final
(Japan) Team Tabata	0	0	0	3	1	1	0	X	5
(Alberta) Keelie Duncan 🔨	0	1	0	0	0	0	2	X	3

Sheet 7	1	2	3	4	5	6	7	8	Final
(Japan) Satsuki Fujisawa	0	1	0	1	0	0	X	X	2
(Alberta) Kayla Skrlik 🔨	2	0	1	0	2	3	X	X	8

=== Draw 6 ===
Saturday, October 12, 12:45 pm

Sheet 1	1	2	3	4	5	6	7	8	Final
(Japan) Miori Nakamura	0	1	0	1	0	0	1	X	3
(Saskatchewan) Ashley Thevenot 🔨	2	0	1	0	4	1	0	X	8

Sheet 3	1	2	3	4	5	6	7	8	Final
(South Korea) Gim Eun-ji	0	1	2	0	3	0	0	0	6
(Manitoba) Beth Peterson 🔨	1	0	0	3	0	1	1	1	7

Sheet 4	1	2	3	4	5	6	7	8	Final
(Manitoba) Team Lawes	0	2	1	0	0	1	0	0	4
(South Korea) Kang Bo-bae 🔨	2	0	0	1	0	0	0	2	5

Sheet 5	1	2	3	4	5	6	7	8	Final
(Alberta) Hannah Phillips	0	2	1	2	0	0	2	0	7
(Alberta) Claire Booth 🔨	1	0	0	0	4	0	0	1	6

Sheet 6	1	2	3	4	5	6	7	8	Final
(Alberta) Selena Sturmay 🔨	0	1	0	3	1	0	5	X	10
(Alberta) Robyn Silvernagle	0	0	2	0	0	1	0	X	3

Sheet 7	1	2	3	4	5	6	7	8	Final
(Alberta) Ryleigh Bakker 🔨	0	1	0	1	0	1	0	2	5
(Alberta) Serena Gray-Withers	0	0	1	0	2	0	1	0	4

=== Draw 7 ===
Saturday, October 12, 4:30 pm

Sheet 1	1	2	3	4	5	6	7	8	9	Final
(Japan) Team Tabata 🔨	0	0	2	2	0	0	1	0	0	5
(Manitoba) Team Lawes	1	0	0	0	1	1	0	2	1	6

Sheet 3	1	2	3	4	5	6	7	8	Final
(South Korea) Park You-been 🔨	0	1	0	2	0	0	2	1	6
(Japan) Sayaka Yoshimura	1	0	1	0	1	1	0	0	4

Sheet 5	1	2	3	4	5	6	7	8	Final
(Japan) Miyu Ueno 🔨	1	1	0	1	1	0	6	X	10
(Alberta) Kayla Skrlik	0	0	2	0	0	1	0	X	3

Sheet 7	1	2	3	4	5	6	7	8	Final
(China) Wang Rui 🔨	0	0	0	2	0	1	0	1	4
(South Korea) Gim Eun-ji	0	0	1	0	1	0	1	0	3

=== Draw 8 ===
Saturday, October 12, 8:15 pm

Sheet 1	1	2	3	4	5	6	7	8	Final
(Alberta) Hannah Phillips	0	2	0	1	0	1	0	2	6
(Alberta) Ryleigh Bakker 🔨	2	0	1	0	1	0	1	0	5

Sheet 2	1	2	3	4	5	6	7	8	Final
(Alberta) Selena Sturmay	1	0	0	0	2	0	1	0	4
(Japan) Satsuki Fujisawa 🔨	0	2	1	1	0	1	0	1	6

Sheet 3	1	2	3	4	5	6	7	8	Final
(South Korea) Ha Seung-youn 🔨	2	3	0	4	2	0	X	X	11
(Northwest Territories) Betti Delorey	0	0	4	0	0	1	X	X	5

Sheet 4	1	2	3	4	5	6	7	8	Final
(Saskatchewan) Ashley Thevenot 🔨	0	0	0	2	1	0	1	0	4
(British Columbia) Corryn Brown	1	1	0	0	0	3	0	1	6

Sheet 5	1	2	3	4	5	6	7	8	Final
(Manitoba) Beth Peterson 🔨	0	2	1	1	0	1	1	X	6
(South Korea) Kang Bo-bae	1	0	0	0	1	0	0	X	2

Sheet 6	1	2	3	4	5	6	7	8	Final
(Alberta) Kaylee McNamee 🔨	0	0	1	1	0	0	2	0	4
(Alberta) Kellie Stiksma	0	1	0	0	1	1	0	3	6

=== Draw 9 ===
Sunday, October 13, 9:00 am

Sheet 1	1	2	3	4	5	6	7	8	Final
(Manitoba) Kristy Watling	0	1	0	2	0	0	1	0	4
(Alberta) Keelie Duncan 🔨	1	0	1	0	2	1	0	1	6

Sheet 2	1	2	3	4	5	6	7	8	Final
(Japan) Miori Nakamura	0	0	0	0	2	0	1	X	3
(Alberta) Robyn Silvernagle 🔨	0	0	0	1	0	5	0	X	6

Sheet 3	1	2	3	4	5	6	7	8	Final
(Italy) Stefania Constantini 🔨	0	2	3	0	2	2	X	X	9
(Alberta) Kayleigh Shannon	0	0	0	2	0	0	X	X	2

Sheet 4	1	2	3	4	5	6	7	8	Final
(South Korea) Park You-been 🔨	0	3	0	2	0	1	0	X	6
(Alberta) Kayla Skrlik	0	0	2	0	2	0	4	X	8

Sheet 5	1	2	3	4	5	6	7	8	Final
(South Korea) Gim Eun-ji	1	0	1	2	0	0	3	X	7
(Japan) Team Tabata 🔨	0	0	0	0	1	1	0	X	2

Sheet 6	1	2	3	4	5	6	7	8	Final
(China) Wang Rui	0	0	0	4	3	X	X	X	7
(Manitoba) Team Lawes 🔨	0	1	0	0	0	X	X	X	1

Sheet 7	1	2	3	4	5	6	7	8	Final
(Japan) Sayaka Yoshimura 🔨	0	1	0	1	0	2	0	1	5
(South Korea) Ha Seung-youn	0	0	1	0	1	0	1	0	3

=== Draw 10 ===
Sunday, October 13, 12:45 pm

Sheet 1	1	2	3	4	5	6	7	8	Final
(Alberta) Claire Booth	1	0	2	1	0	0	0	0	4
(Alberta) Serena Gray-Withers 🔨	0	1	0	0	1	1	2	2	7

Sheet 2	1	2	3	4	5	6	7	8	Final
(Alberta) Hannah Phillips	0	1	0	2	0	0	X	X	3
(South Korea) Kang Bo-bae 🔨	3	0	1	0	2	1	X	X	7

Sheet 3	1	2	3	4	5	6	7	8	Final
(Saskatchewan) Ashley Thevenot	0	1	1	0	0	X	X	X	2
(Alberta) Selena Sturmay 🔨	2	0	0	5	1	X	X	X	8

Sheet 4	1	2	3	4	5	6	7	8	Final
(Alberta) Ryleigh Bakker 🔨	0	0	1	4	0	0	0	1	6
(Alberta) Kellie Stiksma	0	0	0	0	2	2	1	0	5

Sheet 5	1	2	3	4	5	6	7	8	Final
(China) Wang Rui	0	0	2	0	0	0	X	X	2
(Alberta) Kayla Skrlik 🔨	2	0	0	3	1	1	X	X	7

Sheet 6	1	2	3	4	5	6	7	8	Final
(British Columbia) Corryn Brown 🔨	1	0	3	0	0	0	0	X	4
(Japan) Satsuki Fujisawa	0	1	0	2	1	1	2	X	7

=== Draw 11 ===
Sunday, October 13, 5:00 pm

Sheet 1	1	2	3	4	5	6	7	8	9	Final
(Japan) Sayaka Yoshimura 🔨	1	0	1	0	0	0	0	1	0	3
(South Korea) Gim Eun-ji	0	1	0	1	1	0	0	0	1	4

Sheet 2	1	2	3	4	5	6	7	8	Final
(Alberta) Selena Sturmay 🔨	0	2	1	1	0	1	7	X	12
(Alberta) Ryleigh Bakker	0	0	0	0	1	0	0	X	1

Sheet 3	1	2	3	4	5	6	7	8	Final
(Alberta) Robyn Silvernagle 🔨	0	1	0	1	0	0	0	1	3
(Manitoba) Team Lawes	0	0	1	0	0	1	0	0	2

Sheet 4	1	2	3	4	5	6	7	8	Final
(Alberta) Keelie Duncan 🔨	1	0	0	0	1	0	X	X	2
(British Columbia) Corryn Brown	0	2	2	3	0	2	X	X	9

Sheet 5	1	2	3	4	5	6	7	8	Final
(Japan) Satsuki Fujisawa	0	1	0	2	0	1	1	2	7
(South Korea) Kang Bo-bae 🔨	2	0	1	0	2	0	0	0	5

Sheet 6	1	2	3	4	5	6	7	8	9	Final
(Alberta) Serena Gray-Withers	0	2	0	2	0	2	0	0	1	7
(South Korea) Park You-been 🔨	1	0	1	0	2	0	1	1	0	6

Sheet 7	1	2	3	4	5	6	7	8	Final
(Italy) Stefania Constantini 🔨	0	2	1	2	3	X	X	X	8
(Alberta) Hannah Phillips	0	0	0	0	0	X	X	X	0

=== Draw 12 ===
Sunday, October 13, 8:30 pm

Sheet 3	1	2	3	4	5	6	7	8	Final
(Italy) Stefania Constantini 🔨	0	0	0	X	X	X	X	X	0
(British Columbia) Corryn Brown	3	3	2	X	X	X	X	X	8

Sheet 4	1	2	3	4	5	6	7	8	Final
(South Korea) Gim Eun-ji 🔨	0	0	2	0	0	4	0	X	6
(South Korea) Kang Bo-bae	0	1	0	1	0	0	1	X	3

Sheet 5	1	2	3	4	5	6	7	8	Final
(Alberta) Serena Gray-Withers	1	0	0	1	0	X	X	X	2
(Alberta) Robyn Silvernagle 🔨	0	4	2	0	2	X	X	X	8

Sheet 6	1	2	3	4	5	6	7	8	Final
(Alberta) Selena Sturmay	1	0	1	1	0	0	0	2	5
(China) Wang Rui 🔨	0	3	0	0	0	2	1	0	6

== Playoffs ==
Quarterfinals
A1	(Japan) Miyu Ueno	3
C2	(Alberta) Robyn Silvernagle	4
B2	(Japan) Satsuki Fujisawa	2
C4	(South Korea) Gim Eun-ji	6
C1	(China) Wang Rui	4
B1	(Alberta) Kayla Skrlik	2
C3	(British Columbia) Corryn Brown	7
A2	(Manitoba) Beth Peterson	8

Semifinals
C2	(Alberta) Robyn Silvernagle	5
C4	(South Korea) Gim Eun-ji	8
C1	(China) Wang Rui	7
A2	(Manitoba) Beth Peterson	3

Final
C4	(South Korea) Gim Eun-ji	7
C1	(China) Wang Rui	1

=== Quarterfinals ===
Monday, October 14, 9:00 am

Sheet 3	1	2	3	4	5	6	7	8	Final
(Japan) Satsuki Fujisawa 🔨	0	1	0	1	0	0	0	X	2
(South Korea) Gim Eun-ji	0	0	2	0	0	3	1	X	6

Sheet 4	1	2	3	4	5	6	7	8	Final
(China) Wang Rui	0	1	1	0	1	0	0	1	4
(Alberta) Kayla Skrlik 🔨	0	0	0	1	0	1	0	0	2

Sheet 5	1	2	3	4	5	6	7	8	Final
(British Columbia) Corryn Brown	0	2	1	0	2	0	1	1	7
(Manitoba) Beth Peterson 🔨	1	0	0	3	0	4	0	0	8

Sheet 6	1	2	3	4	5	6	7	8	9	Final
(Japan) Miyu Ueno 🔨	1	0	0	0	1	0	0	1	0	3
(Alberta) Robyn Silvernagle	0	0	2	0	0	1	0	0	1	4

=== Semifinals ===
Monday, October 14, 12:15 pm

Sheet 3	1	2	3	4	5	6	7	8	Final
(China) Wang Rui	0	0	2	1	2	0	2	X	7
(Manitoba) Beth Peterson 🔨	1	1	0	0	0	1	0	X	3

Sheet 5	1	2	3	4	5	6	7	8	Final
(Alberta) Robyn Silvernagle	0	2	0	1	0	2	0	0	5
(South Korea) Gim Eun-ji 🔨	2	0	1	0	3	0	0	2	8

=== Final ===
Monday, October 14, 3:30 pm

Sheet 5	1	2	3	4	5	6	7	8	Final
(South Korea) Gim Eun-ji	1	1	2	0	3	X	X	X	7
(China) Wang Rui 🔨	0	0	0	1	0	X	X	X	1
