= 2024 Saskatchewan Scotties Tournament of Hearts =

Women's curling championship

2024 Viterra Scotties Women's Provincial Championship
- Host city: Tisdale, Saskatchewan
- Arena: Recplex
- Dates: January 17–21
- Winner: Team Ackerman
- Curling club: Nutana CC, Saskatoon
- Skip: Skylar Ackerman
- Third: Ashley Thevenot
- Second: Taylor Stremick
- Lead: Kaylin Skinner
- Coach: Patrick Ackerman
- Finalist: Nancy Martin

The 2024 Viterra Saskatchewan Scotties Tournament of Hearts, the provincial women's curling championship for Saskatchewan, was held from January 17 to 21 at the Recplex in Tisdale, Saskatchewan. The winning Skylar Ackerman rink represented Saskatchewan at the 2024 Scotties Tournament of Hearts in Calgary, Alberta.

== Qualification process ==
Teams

Qualification method	Berths	Qualifying team(s)
CTRS Leaders	4	Skylar Ackerman; Michelle Englot; Nancy Martin; Sherrilee Orsted
SWCT Leaders	4	Sherry Anderson; Penny Barker; Jessica Mitchell; Robyn Silvernagle
Last Chance Qualifier	4	Amber Holland; Mandy Selzer; Brooklyn Stevenson; Jana Tisdale

== Teams ==
The teams are listed as follows:

Skip	Third	Second	Lead	Alternate	Coach	Club
Skylar Ackerman	Ashley Thevenot	Taylor Stremick	Kaylin Skinner		Patrick Ackerman	Nutana CC, Saskatoon
Sherry Anderson	Patty Hersikorn	Denise Hersikorn	Anita Silvernagle			Nutana CC, Saskatoon
Penny Barker	Christie Gamble	Jenna Enge	Danielle Sicinski		Mark Lang	Moose Jaw CC, Moose Jaw
Stephanie Schmidt (Fourth)	Sara England	Ashley Williamson	Michelle Englot (Skip)		Joan McCusker	Highland CC, Regina
Amber Holland	Kim Schneider	Jill Springer	Deb Lozinski		Travis Brown	Kronau CC, Kronau
Nancy Martin	Lindsay Bertsch	Madison Kleiter	Krysten Karwacki		Gerry Adam	Martensville CC, Martensville
Jessica Mitchell	Jenna Hope	Meaghan Frerichs	Michelle Johnson		Jim Wilson	Nutana CC, Saskatoon
Sherrilee Orsted	Candace Newkirk	Shalon Fleming	Jasmine Kerr	Jade Kerr	Trevor Kerr	Moose Jaw CC, Moose Jaw
Mandy Selzer	Erin Barnhart	Megan Selzer	Sarah Slywka		Ken Bakken	Balgonie CC, Balgonie
Robyn Silvernagle	Kelly Schafer	Chaelynn Kitz	Kara Thevenot			Twin Rivers CC, North Battleford
Brooklyn Stevenson	Breanne Knapp	Callan Hamon	Nicole Bender	Chelsey Emberley		Highland CC, Regina
Jana Tisdale	Jade Bloor	Chantel Martin	Carla Anaka		James Malainey	Highland CC, Regina

== Round robin standings ==
Final Round Robin Standings

Key
Teams to Playoffs
Teams to Tiebreaker

Pool A
Skip	W	L	PF	PA	EW	EL	BE	SE
Nancy Martin	5	0	41	30	29	18	2	12
Penny Barker	3	2	38	26	23	18	1	13
Sherrilee Orsted	2	3	25	36	19	21	3	7
Brooklyn Stevenson	2	3	31	32	20	22	5	7
Amber Holland	2	3	32	31	18	22	2	5
Sherry Anderson	1	4	27	39	16	24	1	2

Pool B
Skip	W	L	PF	PA	EW	EL	BE	SE
Skylar Ackerman	4	1	42	29	21	20	2	5
Jessica Mitchell	3	2	38	32	25	15	2	13
Michelle Englot	3	2	31	29	19	21	7	4
Robyn Silvernagle	3	2	30	32	19	20	2	6
Jana Tisdale	1	4	26	33	17	23	2	8
Mandy Selzer	1	4	19	31	17	19	3	7

== Round robin results ==
All draw times listed in Central Time (UTC−06:00).

=== Draw 1 ===
Wednesday, January 17, 7:30 pm

Sheet 1	1	2	3	4	5	6	7	8	9	10	Final
Jessica Mitchell 🔨	1	1	0	2	1	0	2	2	X	X	9
Robyn Silvernagle	0	0	2	0	0	1	0	0	X	X	3

Sheet 2	1	2	3	4	5	6	7	8	9	10	Final
Nancy Martin 🔨	0	2	0	1	0	3	0	1	0	0	7
Sherrilee Orsted	0	0	1	0	2	0	0	0	2	1	6

Sheet 3	1	2	3	4	5	6	7	8	9	10	Final
Skylar Ackerman 🔨	0	1	0	1	0	1	2	1	0	1	7
Michelle Englot	0	0	1	0	1	0	0	0	2	0	4

Sheet 4	1	2	3	4	5	6	7	8	9	10	Final
Sherry Anderson 🔨	0	2	0	2	0	0	0	1	X	X	5
Penny Barker	2	0	3	0	2	1	2	0	X	X	10

=== Draw 2 ===
Thursday, January 18, 9:00 am

Sheet 1	1	2	3	4	5	6	7	8	9	10	11	Final
Penny Barker	0	3	0	0	0	1	0	1	0	1	0	6
Amber Holland 🔨	2	0	0	2	1	0	0	0	1	0	1	7

Sheet 2	1	2	3	4	5	6	7	8	9	10	Final
Skylar Ackerman 🔨	0	2	0	2	0	0	0	3	0	X	7
Mandy Selzer	0	0	1	0	1	1	1	0	0	X	4

Sheet 3	1	2	3	4	5	6	7	8	9	10	Final
Robyn Silvernagle 🔨	0	1	2	1	0	2	0	1	0	X	7
Jana Tisdale	1	0	0	0	1	0	2	0	1	X	5

Sheet 4	1	2	3	4	5	6	7	8	9	10	Final
Nancy Martin 🔨	2	0	1	0	2	1	0	1	0	1	8
Brooklyn Stevenson	0	2	0	2	0	0	2	0	1	0	7

=== Draw 3 ===
Thursday, January 18, 3:00 pm

Sheet 1	1	2	3	4	5	6	7	8	9	10	Final
Sherrilee Orsted	1	0	1	0	0	1	0	1	0	X	4
Sherry Anderson 🔨	0	1	0	2	1	0	2	0	4	X	10

Sheet 2	1	2	3	4	5	6	7	8	9	10	Final
Michelle Englot 🔨	0	1	1	0	0	0	3	0	0	0	5
Jessica Mitchell	0	0	0	0	2	3	0	1	0	2	8

Sheet 3	1	2	3	4	5	6	7	8	9	10	Final
Nancy Martin 🔨	1	1	1	0	1	1	0	0	2	2	9
Amber Holland	0	0	0	3	0	0	1	1	0	0	5

Sheet 4	1	2	3	4	5	6	7	8	9	10	Final
Skylar Ackerman 🔨	0	1	0	0	2	0	2	1	3	X	9
Jana Tisdale	1	0	1	1	0	2	0	0	0	X	5

=== Draw 4 ===
Thursday, January 18, 7:30 pm

Sheet 1	1	2	3	4	5	6	7	8	9	10	Final
Michelle Englot 🔨	0	3	0	3	1	0	1	0	3	X	11
Robyn Silvernagle	0	0	2	0	0	2	0	1	0	X	5

Sheet 2	1	2	3	4	5	6	7	8	9	10	Final
Sherrilee Orsted 🔨	0	0	0	2	0	0	0	X	X	X	2
Penny Barker	1	1	2	0	1	3	1	X	X	X	9

Sheet 3	1	2	3	4	5	6	7	8	9	10	Final
Sherry Anderson 🔨	1	0	1	0	0	0	1	0	2	0	5
Brooklyn Stevenson	0	0	0	2	0	1	0	2	0	2	7

Sheet 4	1	2	3	4	5	6	7	8	9	10	Final
Jessica Mitchell 🔨	0	1	0	0	0	1	0	1	2	0	5
Mandy Selzer	0	0	1	1	1	0	1	0	0	2	6

=== Draw 5 ===
Friday, January 19, 10:00 am

Sheet 1	1	2	3	4	5	6	7	8	9	10	11	Final
Nancy Martin	0	0	0	0	1	0	2	0	2	1	1	7
Penny Barker 🔨	0	1	0	2	0	2	0	1	0	0	0	6

Sheet 2	1	2	3	4	5	6	7	8	9	10	Final
Skylar Ackerman	1	0	1	0	0	0	3	0	X	X	5
Robyn Silvernagle 🔨	0	2	0	2	1	3	0	2	X	X	10

Sheet 3	1	2	3	4	5	6	7	8	9	10	Final
Michelle Englot 🔨	2	1	0	0	0	0	1	0	0	1	5
Jana Tisdale	0	0	1	0	1	0	0	1	1	0	4

Sheet 4	1	2	3	4	5	6	7	8	9	10	Final
Sherrilee Orsted 🔨	0	1	2	0	1	1	0	0	0	2	7
Amber Holland	0	0	0	2	0	0	2	2	0	0	6

=== Draw 6 ===
Friday, January 19, 3:00 pm

Sheet 1	1	2	3	4	5	6	7	8	9	10	Final
Skylar Ackerman 🔨	3	0	0	3	0	2	0	6	X	X	14
Jessica Mitchell	0	1	1	0	2	0	2	0	X	X	6

Sheet 2	1	2	3	4	5	6	7	8	9	10	Final
Nancy Martin	0	2	0	3	1	0	1	1	1	1	10
Sherry Anderson 🔨	1	0	2	0	0	3	0	0	0	0	6

Sheet 3	1	2	3	4	5	6	7	8	9	10	Final
Robyn Silvernagle 🔨	0	0	1	0	0	2	0	1	0	1	5
Mandy Selzer	0	0	0	1	1	0	0	0	0	0	2

Sheet 4	1	2	3	4	5	6	7	8	9	10	Final
Penny Barker	0	2	1	3	0	0	0	0	1	X	7
Brooklyn Stevenson 🔨	0	0	0	0	2	1	1	1	0	X	5

=== Draw 7 ===
Friday, January 19, 7:30 pm

Sheet 1	1	2	3	4	5	6	7	8	9	10	Final
Sherry Anderson	0	0	0	1	0	X	X	X	X	X	1
Amber Holland 🔨	2	3	2	0	1	X	X	X	X	X	8

Sheet 2	1	2	3	4	5	6	7	8	9	10	Final
Jessica Mitchell 🔨	0	2	1	1	1	3	1	1	X	X	10
Jana Tisdale	4	0	0	0	0	0	0	0	X	X	4

Sheet 3	1	2	3	4	5	6	7	8	9	10	Final
Sherrilee Orsted	0	0	2	0	0	1	1	1	0	1	6
Brooklyn Stevenson 🔨	0	1	0	2	1	0	0	0	0	0	4

Sheet 4	1	2	3	4	5	6	7	8	9	10	Final
Michelle Englot 🔨	0	0	0	1	0	2	2	0	0	1	6
Mandy Selzer	1	0	1	0	1	0	0	2	0	0	5

=== Draw 8 ===
Saturday, January 20, 10:00 am

Sheet 1	1	2	3	4	5	6	7	8	9	10	Final
Jana Tisdale 🔨	0	0	2	2	2	0	2	0	X	X	8
Mandy Selzer	0	0	0	0	0	1	0	1	X	X	2

Sheet 3	1	2	3	4	5	6	7	8	9	10	Final
Amber Holland 🔨	0	0	2	0	0	3	0	1	0	X	6
Brooklyn Stevenson	1	2	0	0	2	0	2	0	1	X	8

== Tiebreaker ==
Saturday, January 20, 3:00 pm

Sheet 2	1	2	3	4	5	6	7	8	9	10	Final
Jessica Mitchell 🔨	1	0	0	0	1	0	1	0	1	X	4
Michelle Englot	0	2	1	1	0	1	0	3	0	X	8

== Playoffs ==
Page playoff system
A1	Nancy Martin	6
B1	Skylar Ackerman	7
A2	Penny Barker	6
B2	Michelle Englot	9

Semifinal
A1	Nancy Martin	10
B2	Michelle Englot	8

Final
B1	Skylar Ackerman	10
A1	Nancy Martin	9

=== A1 vs. B1 ===
Saturday, January 20, 7:30 pm

Sheet 2	1	2	3	4	5	6	7	8	9	10	Final
Nancy Martin 🔨	0	0	2	1	0	1	0	1	1	0	6
Skylar Ackerman	0	2	0	0	1	0	2	0	0	2	7

=== A2 vs. B2 ===
Saturday, January 20, 7:30 pm

Sheet 4	1	2	3	4	5	6	7	8	9	10	Final
Penny Barker	0	2	1	0	0	2	0	1	0	X	6
Michelle Englot 🔨	1	0	0	1	2	0	3	0	2	X	9

=== Semifinal ===
Sunday, January 21, 10:00 am

Sheet 3	1	2	3	4	5	6	7	8	9	10	11	Final
Nancy Martin 🔨	1	0	0	3	0	0	1	0	1	2	2	10
Michelle Englot	0	1	0	0	2	1	0	4	0	0	0	8

=== Final ===
Sunday, January 21, 3:00 pm

Sheet 2	1	2	3	4	5	6	7	8	9	10	11	Final
Skylar Ackerman 🔨	0	0	3	0	0	3	0	0	3	0	1	10
Nancy Martin	1	1	0	1	1	0	1	3	0	1	0	9

2024 Saskatchewan Scotties Tournament of Hearts

Skylar Ackerman
1st Saskatchewan Provincial Championship title
