= 2023 Saskatchewan Scotties Tournament of Hearts =

Women's curling championship

2023 Viterra Scotties Women's Provincial Championship
- Host city: Estevan, Saskatchewan
- Arena: Affinity Place
- Dates: January 25–29
- Winner: Team Silvernagle
- Curling club: Twin Rivers CC, North Battleford
- Skip: Robyn Silvernagle
- Third: Kelly Schafer
- Second: Sherry Just
- Lead: Kara Thevenot
- Finalist: Nancy Martin

The 2023 Viterra Saskatchewan Scotties Tournament of Hearts, the provincial women's curling championship for Saskatchewan, was held from January 25 to 29 at the Affinity Place in Estevan, Saskatchewan. The winning Robyn Silvernagle rink represented Saskatchewan at the 2023 Scotties Tournament of Hearts in Kamloops, British Columbia, and finished eighth in Pool A with a 2–6 record.

Silvernagle's title was improbable as the team was put together at the last minute and they only had one practice together prior to the last chance qualifier. Additionally, the title was emotional for Silvernagle as she was out of competitive curling after giving birth to her son, Kolt in 2021, who spent almost a year in the hospital and endured multiple surgeries.

== Qualification process ==
Qualification method	Berths	Qualifying team(s)
CTRS Leaders	4	Skylar Ackerman; Penny Barker; Amber Holland; Nancy Martin
SCT Leaders	4	Sherry Anderson; Jessica Mitchell; Lorraine Schneider; Brooklyn Stevenson
Last Chance Qualifier	4	Ashley Howard; Madison Kleiter; Cindy Ricci; Robyn Silvernagle

== Teams ==
The teams are listed as follows:

Skip	Third	Second	Lead	Alternate	Club
Skylar Ackerman	Kya Kennedy	Taylor Stremick	Kaylin Skinner		Sutherland CC, Saskatoon
Sherry Anderson	Patty Hersikorn	Brenda Goertzen	Anita Silvernagle		Nutana CC, Saskatoon
Penny Barker	Christie Gamble	Jenna Enge	Danielle Sicinski		Moose Jaw CC, Moose Jaw
Amber Holland	Kim Schneider	Karlee Kendel	Debbie Lozinski		Kronau CC, Kronau
Cary-Anne McTaggart (Fourth)	Ashley Howard (Skip)	Shelby Lamontagne	Jill Springer		Highland CC, Regina
Madison Kleiter	Chantel Hoag	Rianna Kish	Hanna Johnson		Sutherland CC, Saskatoon
Nancy Martin	Lindsay Bertsch	Jennifer Armstrong	Krysten Karwacki		Martensville CC, Martensville
Jessica Mitchell	Jenna Hope	Meaghan Frerichs	Teresa Waterfield		Sutherland CC, Saskatoon
Cindy Ricci	Kristy Johnson	Tamara Kapell	Natalie Bloomfield		Estevan CC, Estevan
Larisa Murray (Fourth)	Lorraine Schneider (Skip)	Ashley Williamson	Amanda Kuzyk		Highland CC, Regina
Robyn Silvernagle	Kelly Schafer	Sherry Just	Kara Thevenot		Twin Rivers CC, North Battleford
Brooklyn Stevenson	Candace Chisholm	Michelle Englot	Nicole Bender	Sara England	Highland CC, Regina

== Knockout brackets ==
=== A event ===
First Knockout	Qualifier 1
Penny Barker	7
Jessica Mitchell	4	Ashley Howard	8
Ashley Howard	7	Ashley Howard	6
Sherry Anderson	8
Amber Holland	3
Sherry Anderson	8	Sherry Anderson	10
Madison Kleiter	7	Sherry Anderson	6
Nancy Martin	7
Nancy Martin	11
Lorraine Schneider	8	Lorraine Schneider	9
Cindy Ricci	4	Nancy Martin	9
Robyn Silvernagle	2
Skylar Ackerman	4
Brooklyn Stevenson	2	Robyn Silvernagle	9
Robyn Silvernagle	6

=== B event ===
Second Knockout	Qualifier 2
Jessica Mitchell	3
Amber Holland	8	Amber Holland	3
Robyn Silvernagle	10
Robyn Silvernagle	8
Madison Kleiter	3	Lorraine Schneider	4
Lorraine Schneider	8	Lorraine Schneider	9
Ashley Howard	3
Robyn Silvernagle	8
Cindy Ricci	7	Sherry Anderson	2
Skylar Ackerman	9	Skylar Ackerman	5
Brooklyn Stevenson	7	Brooklyn Stevenson	10
Penny Barker	5	Brooklyn Stevenson	2
Sherry Anderson	7

=== C event ===
Third Knockout	Qualifier 3
Jessica Mitchell	8
Madison Kleiter	7	Jessica Mitchell	2
Brooklyn Stevenson	10
Brooklyn Stevenson	8
Skylar Ackerman	15
Skylar Ackerman	11
Lorraine Schneider	3

Third Knockout				Qualifier 4
Cindy Ricci	6
Amber Holland	5	Cindy Ricci	3
Penny Barker	8	Penny Barker	9
Ashley Howard	5			Penny Barker	5
				Sherry Anderson	7

== Knockout results ==
All draw times listed in Central Time (UTC−06:00).

=== Draw 1 ===
Wednesday, January 25, 7:30 pm

Sheet 1	1	2	3	4	5	6	7	8	9	10	Final
Sherry Anderson 🔨	1	2	0	0	2	0	1	2	0	0	8
Madison Kleiter	0	0	3	1	0	1	0	0	1	1	7

Sheet 2	1	2	3	4	5	6	7	8	9	10	Final
Lorraine Schneider 🔨	2	1	0	2	0	1	1	1	0	X	8
Cindy Ricci	0	0	1	0	1	0	0	0	2	X	4

Sheet 3	1	2	3	4	5	6	7	8	9	10	Final
Jessica Mitchell	0	0	0	1	2	0	1	0	0	X	4
Ashley Howard 🔨	0	2	1	0	0	1	0	1	2	X	7

Sheet 4	1	2	3	4	5	6	7	8	9	10	Final
Brooklyn Stevenson 🔨	0	1	0	1	0	0	0	0	0	X	2
Robyn Silvernagle	0	0	2	0	0	1	0	2	1	X	6

=== Draw 2 ===
Thursday, January 26, 9:00 am

Sheet 1	1	2	3	4	5	6	7	8	9	10	Final
Penny Barker	0	1	0	1	0	2	0	2	0	1	7
Ashley Howard 🔨	2	0	0	0	4	0	1	0	1	0	8

Sheet 2	1	2	3	4	5	6	7	8	9	10	Final
Skylar Ackerman	0	1	1	0	1	0	1	0	0	X	4
Robyn Silvernagle 🔨	3	0	0	1	0	2	0	2	1	X	9

Sheet 3	1	2	3	4	5	6	7	8	9	10	Final
Amber Holland	0	0	2	0	1	0	X	X	X	X	3
Sherry Anderson 🔨	2	4	0	2	0	2	X	X	X	X	10

Sheet 4	1	2	3	4	5	6	7	8	9	10	Final
Nancy Martin	0	0	0	2	1	0	3	0	3	2	11
Lorraine Schneider 🔨	2	4	1	0	0	1	0	1	0	0	9

=== Draw 3 ===
Thursday, January 26, 3:00 pm

Sheet 2	1	2	3	4	5	6	7	8	9	10	Final
Madison Kleiter	0	0	1	0	0	2	0	0	0	X	3
Lorraine Schneider 🔨	2	0	0	0	1	0	2	0	3	X	8

Sheet 4	1	2	3	4	5	6	7	8	9	10	Final
Jessica Mitchell	0	0	0	0	0	0	3	X	X	X	3
Amber Holland 🔨	0	0	1	1	2	1	0	3	X	X	8

=== Draw 4 ===
Thursday, January 26, 7:30 pm

Sheet 1	1	2	3	4	5	6	7	8	9	10	11	Final
Cindy Ricci	0	0	2	1	0	2	0	0	1	1	0	7
Skylar Ackerman 🔨	0	3	0	0	2	0	1	1	0	0	2	9

Sheet 2	1	2	3	4	5	6	7	8	9	10	Final
Brooklyn Stevenson 🔨	2	1	0	0	2	1	0	0	0	1	7
Penny Barker	0	0	1	1	0	0	1	1	1	0	5

Sheet 3	1	2	3	4	5	6	7	8	9	10	Final
Nancy Martin 🔨	1	2	3	0	0	3	X	X	X	X	9
Robyn Silvernagle	0	0	0	1	1	0	X	X	X	X	2

Sheet 4	1	2	3	4	5	6	7	8	9	10	Final
Ashley Howard	0	3	0	2	0	1	0	0	0	X	6
Sherry Anderson 🔨	2	0	1	0	2	0	2	1	0	X	8

=== Draw 5 ===
Friday, January 28, 10:00 am

Sheet 1	1	2	3	4	5	6	7	8	9	10	Final
Amber Holland	0	1	0	0	2	0	0	0	X	X	3
Robyn Silvernagle 🔨	1	0	2	1	0	4	0	2	X	X	10

Sheet 3	1	2	3	4	5	6	7	8	9	10	Final
Lorraine Schneider 🔨	0	2	0	0	2	1	0	0	4	X	9
Ashley Howard	0	0	0	1	0	0	1	1	0	X	3

=== Draw 6 ===
Friday, January 27, 3:00 pm

Sheet 1	1	2	3	4	5	6	7	8	9	10	Final
Jessica Mitchell 🔨	1	0	1	0	1	0	4	0	0	1	8
Madison Kleiter	0	1	0	3	0	1	0	0	2	0	7

Sheet 2	1	2	3	4	5	6	7	8	9	10	Final
Sherry Anderson	0	0	1	0	2	0	2	0	1	0	6
Nancy Martin 🔨	1	2	0	0	0	2	0	1	0	1	7

Sheet 3	1	2	3	4	5	6	7	8	9	10	Final
Skylar Ackerman	0	0	2	1	1	0	1	0	0	X	5
Brooklyn Stevenson 🔨	1	1	0	0	0	4	0	2	2	X	10

=== Draw 7 ===
Friday, January 27, 7:30 pm

Sheet 1	1	2	3	4	5	6	7	8	9	10	Final
Penny Barker 🔨	2	0	3	1	1	1	0	0	0	X	8
Ashley Howard	0	2	0	0	0	0	2	0	1	X	5

Sheet 2	1	2	3	4	5	6	7	8	9	10	Final
Robyn Silvernagle	0	0	3	1	0	2	1	0	1	X	8
Lorraine Schneider 🔨	1	1	0	0	0	0	0	2	0	X	4

Sheet 3	1	2	3	4	5	6	7	8	9	10	Final
Cindy Ricci 🔨	0	2	1	0	1	0	0	0	0	2	6
Amber Holland	0	0	0	2	0	0	1	1	1	0	5

Sheet 4	1	2	3	4	5	6	7	8	9	10	Final
Brooklyn Stevenson	0	0	1	0	1	0	0	0	X	X	2
Sherry Anderson 🔨	1	2	0	2	0	0	1	1	X	X	7

=== Draw 8 ===
Saturday, January 28, 10:00 am

Sheet 1	1	2	3	4	5	6	7	8	9	10	Final
Skylar Ackerman 🔨	0	3	0	2	1	1	0	0	4	X	11
Lorraine Schneider	0	0	1	0	0	0	1	1	0	X	3

Sheet 2	1	2	3	4	5	6	7	8	9	10	Final
Jessica Mitchell	0	1	0	1	0	0	X	X	X	X	2
Brooklyn Stevenson 🔨	2	0	2	0	3	3	X	X	X	X	10

Sheet 3	1	2	3	4	5	6	7	8	9	10	Final
Robyn Silvernagle 🔨	0	0	1	3	0	0	4	X	X	X	8
Sherry Anderson	0	0	0	0	1	1	0	X	X	X	2

Sheet 4	1	2	3	4	5	6	7	8	9	10	Final
Cindy Ricci 🔨	1	0	1	0	0	1	0	0	0	X	3
Penny Barker	0	2	0	2	1	0	2	0	2	X	9

=== Draw 9 ===
Saturday, January 28, 3:00 pm

Sheet 2	1	2	3	4	5	6	7	8	9	10	Final
Penny Barker	0	0	1	0	0	1	0	3	0	X	5
Sherry Anderson 🔨	1	1	0	1	1	0	2	0	1	X	7

Sheet 3	1	2	3	4	5	6	7	8	9	10	Final
Brooklyn Stevenson	0	0	4	0	2	2	0	0	0	X	8
Skylar Ackerman 🔨	0	3	0	2	0	0	5	2	3	X	15

== Playoffs ==
Page playoff system
A	Nancy Martin	9
B	Robyn Silvernagle	8
C1	Skylar Ackerman	7
C2	Sherry Anderson	8

Semifinal
B	Robyn Silvernagle	12
C2	Sherry Anderson	7

Final
A	Nancy Martin	4
B	Robyn Silvernagle	8

=== A vs. B ===
Saturday, January 28, 7:30 pm

Sheet 2	1	2	3	4	5	6	7	8	9	10	Final
Nancy Martin 🔨	2	1	0	3	0	1	0	0	2	0	9
Robyn Silvernagle	0	0	4	0	2	0	0	1	0	1	8

=== C1 vs. C2 ===
Saturday, January 28, 7:30 pm

Sheet 4	1	2	3	4	5	6	7	8	9	10	11	Final
Skylar Ackerman	0	2	0	1	0	1	0	0	3	0	0	7
Sherry Anderson 🔨	1	0	0	0	1	0	2	1	0	2	1	8

=== Semifinal ===
Sunday, January 29, 10:00 am

Sheet 3	1	2	3	4	5	6	7	8	9	10	Final
Robyn Silvernagle 🔨	3	0	3	0	4	0	2	0	X	X	12
Sherry Anderson	0	2	0	1	0	2	0	2	X	X	7

=== Final ===
Sunday, January 29, 3:00 pm

Sheet 2	1	2	3	4	5	6	7	8	9	10	Final
Nancy Martin 🔨	1	0	0	1	0	1	0	1	0	X	4
Robyn Silvernagle	0	2	1	0	2	0	1	0	2	X	8

2023 Saskatchewan Scotties Tournament of Hearts

Robyn Silvernagle
3rd Saskatchewan Provincial Championship title
