= Rachel Big Eagle =

Canadian curler

- Curler
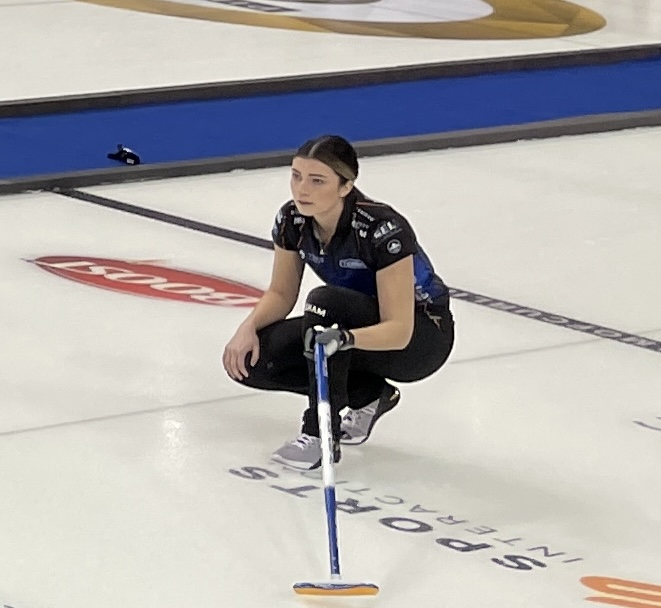
- Big Eagle at the 2022 Players' Championship
- Born: January 9, 1999 (age 27); Brandon, Manitoba

Team
- Curling club: Maryfield CC, Maryfield, SK
- Skip: Skylar Ackerman
- Third: Robyn Silvernagle
- Second: Rachel Big Eagle
- Lead: Mary Little

Curling career
- Member Association: Saskatchewan (2013–2022; 2024–present); Manitoba (2021; 2022–2024)
- Hearts: 3 (2021, 2022, 2026)
- Top CTRS ranking: 6th (2021–22)
Medal record
Women's curling
Representing Canada
World Junior Curling Championships
Gold medal – first place	2020 Krasnoyarsk

Rachel Big Eagle (born Rachel Erickson on January 9, 1999) is a Canadian curler from Maryfield, Saskatchewan. She is currently the second on Team Skylar Ackerman. She was the alternate for the Mackenzie Zacharias rink that won the 2020 World Junior Curling Championships.

== Career ==
=== Juniors ===
Big Eagle's first national championships was in 2016 at the 2016 U18 International Curling Championships where she skipped Saskatchewan to a 3–2 record. She won the provincial championship again the following year and finished 3–5 at the 2017 Canadian U18 Curling Championships. Two years later, she won her first provincial junior title and finished in seventh place with a 5–5 record at the 2019 Canadian Junior Curling Championships in her home province. She joined the Ashley Thevenot rink at third the following season and the team won the provincial junior championship. Big Eagle would once again settle for a seventh-place finish at the 2020 Canadian Junior Curling Championships, once again with a 5–5 record. She was then asked by the winners of the event, Manitoba's Mackenzie Zacharias if she would join them at the 2020 World Junior Curling Championships in Krasnoyarsk, Russia. After finishing the round robin in second place, they would defeat Russia in the semifinal and South Korea in the final to claim the gold medal. Big Eagle played in one game at the championship, where Canada defeated Latvia 13–2.

=== Women's ===
Big Eagle aged out of juniors after the season. On March 19, 2020, it was announced that she would be joining the new team of Stephanie Schmidt, Brooklyn Stevenson, and Jennifer Armstrong for the 2020–21 season. The team played in three local events during the abbreviated season, qualifying in one of them. After the season, Brooklyn Stevenson left the team. Big Eagle, Schmidt and Armstrong then added Chelsea Carey and Jolene Campbell for the 2021–22 season, shifting Big Eagle to alternate. Also during the 2020–21 season, Big Eagle made her first appearance at the Scotties as the alternate for Team Zacharias, who represented Wild Card #2. At the 2021 Scotties Tournament of Hearts in Calgary, Alberta, the team finished with a 3–5 round robin record, failing to qualify for the championship round.

The new Team Carey found success in just their second event together, going undefeated to claim the Craven SPORTS Services Curling Classic tour event title. They then made the semifinals of the 2021 Curlers Corner Autumn Gold Curling Classic where they were eliminated by Tabitha Peterson. At the event, however, they were able to defeat the likes of Rachel Homan, Jennifer Jones and Jamie Sinclair en route to the semifinals. They also qualified for the playoffs at the Boundary Ford Curling Classic, SaskTour Women's Moose Jaw, Red Deer Curling Classic and the DeKalb Superspiel, however, were not able to reach the final in any of the four events. Their next event was the 2022 Saskatchewan Scotties Tournament of Hearts, which they entered as the top ranked team. Team Carey qualified through the A-side of the tournament with a perfect 3–0 record. This earned them a spot in the 1 vs. 2 page playoff game where they defeated Penny Barker. In the final, they once again faced the Barker rink. This time, Team Barker would win the match 7–5, despite Team Carey beating them in both the A Final and 1 vs. 2 page playoff game. Despite this, they still qualified for the 2022 Scotties Tournament of Hearts as Wild Card #2 after Curling Canada used the same format from the 2021 event. At the championship, the team finished with a 4–4 round robin record, not advancing to the playoff round. Team Carey wrapped up their season at the 2022 Players' Championship where they missed the playoffs.

On April 3, 2022, the team announced that they would be disbanding at the end of the 2021–22 season. Big Eagle, Carey and Campbell later announced that they would be staying together and adding Liz Fyfe to the team for the 2022–23 season.

Big Eagle would start to notably find success again with her new team during the 2024-25 curling season, skipped by former teammate Jolene Campbell, alongside Abby Ackland and Dayna Demmans. The team began at the 2024 PointsBet Invitational which they qualified for through CTRS points. In the opening round, they lost 8–5 to Kate Cameron. On tour, they only reached the playoffs once at the Martensville International where they made the semifinals. They also played in the 2024 Tour Challenge Tier 2, however, finished 1–3. Although they struggled throughout the tour season, Team Campbell turned things around at the 2025 Viterra Prairie Pinnacle, going 7–1 through the round robin and earning a spot in the 1 vs. 2 game where they beat Nancy Martin. Facing Martin again in the final, the team was unable to overcome an early four-point deficit, losing 8–7 and finishing second. Ackland then left the rink and was replaced by Robyn Silvernagle for the 2025–26 season. On tour, the team made one final in Moose Jaw and qualified in four other events. At provincials, they finished second through the round robin with a 6–2 record but then knocked off the previously undefeated Ashley Thevenot 10–7 to qualify for the championship game. There, after losing the final in 2022 and 2025, Big Eagle won her first provincial championship when her team beat Jana Tisdale 4–3 in the final.

== Personal life ==
Big Eagle was an Agronomy student at the University of Saskatchewan. She currently works as an agronomist with Erickson Farms and lives in Maryfield, Saskatchewan. She is married to Jett Big Eagle.

== Teams ==
Season	Skip	Third	Second	Lead	Alternate
2013–14	Chaelynn Kitz	Rikki Schick	Taylor Marcotte	Rachel Erickson	
2014–15	Chaelynn Kitz	Rikki Schick	Taylor Marcotte	Rachel Erickson	
2015–16	Chaelynn Kitz	Rikki Schick	Taylor Marcotte	Rachel Erickson	
2016–17	Chaelynn Kitz	Rikki Schick	Rachel Erickson	Sarah Hoag	
2017–18	Rachel Erickson	Sarah Hoag	Taylor Marcotte	Jade Goebel	
2018–19	Sara England	Rachel Erickson	Sarah Hoag	Jade Goebel	
2019–20	Ashley Thevenot	Rachel Erickson	Paige Engel	Mary Engel	
2020–21	Stephanie Schmidt	Brooklyn Stevenson	Jennifer Armstrong	Rachel Erickson	
2021–22	Chelsea Carey	Jolene Campbell	Stephanie Schmidt	Jennifer Armstrong	Rachel Erickson
2022–23	Chelsea Carey	Jolene Campbell	Liz Fyfe	Rachel Erickson	Jamie Sinclair
2023–24	Jolene Campbell	Abby Ackland	Rachel Erickson	Sara Oliver	Liz Fyfe
2024–25	Jolene Campbell	Rachel Erickson	Abby Ackland	Dayna Demmans	
2025–26	Jolene Campbell	Robyn Silvernagle	Rachel Big Eagle	Dayna Demmans	
2026–27	Skylar Ackerman	Robyn Silvernagle	Rachel Big Eagle	Mary Little	
