= Skylar Ackerman =

Canadian curler

- Curler
- Born: August 20, 2001 (age 25); Chamberlain, Saskatchewan

Team
- Curling club: Moose Jaw Ford CC, Moose Jaw, SK
- Skip: Skylar Ackerman
- Third: Robyn Silvernagle
- Second: Rachel Big Eagle
- Lead: Mary Little

Curling career
- Member Association: Saskatchewan
- Hearts: 2 (2023, 2024)
- Top CTRS ranking: 12th (2023–24)

Skylar Ackerman (born August 20, 2001) is a Canadian curler from Saskatoon, Saskatchewan.

== Career ==
Ackerman made her first appearance at the national level at the 2018 Canadian U18 Curling Championships. There, she skipped her Saskatchewan rink of Madison Johnson, Chantel Hoag and Samantha McLaren to a 4–2 round robin record, qualifying for the championship pool. The team then won both of their championship round games to earn a berth in the playoffs. After defeating Alberta's Ryleigh Bakker 6–5 in the semifinal, they lost 6–3 in the championship game to Nova Scotia's Isabelle Ladouceur, settling for silver.

The following season, Team Ackerman lost the provincial final of the Saskatchewan junior championship to the Rachel Erickson rink. However, because Prince Albert, Saskatchewan was hosting the 2019 Canadian Junior Curling Championships, Saskatchewan got two berths into the national championship. Team Ackerman qualified as the Saskatchewan Host Team. Through the round robin, the team posted a 1–5 record, eventually finishing in thirteenth place with a 2–7 record. Also during the 2018–19 season, Team Ackerman represented Saskatchewan at the 2019 Canada Winter Games in Red Deer, Alberta. Through the round robin, the team finished in fifth place with a 6–4 record, qualifying for the playoffs. They then lost to Nova Scotia's Cally Moore 6–3 in the quarterfinals, finishing sixth overall.

With the rest of her team aging out of juniors, Ackerman formed a new rink with Emily Haupstein, Taylor Stremick and Abbey Johnson to try to capture the 2020 provincial junior title. Through the round robin, the team finished in first with a 6–1 record, earning a spot in the 1 vs. 2 game. There, they lost to Ashley Thevenot 6–4 but bounced back with an 11–6 victory over Krystal Englot in the semifinal game. In the provincial final, they were defeated once again by the Thevenot rink in a 7–5 decision.

During the abbreviated 2020–21 season, Team Ackerman played in three events. After failing to reach the playoffs twice, they made the semifinals of the SWCT South Moose Jaw event where they were defeated by Amber Holland. The following season, the team altered their lineup, moving Haupstein to skip and Ackerman to third. The team did not find much success, failing to qualify in any of their four events. At the provincial junior championship, they failed to reach the playoffs.

Aged out of juniors, Ackerman created a new team with Kya Kennedy, Stremick and Kaylin Skinner for the 2022–23 season. In their first event together, the team reached the final of the U25 NextGen Classic where they came up short to Serena Gray-Withers. They also reached the final of their next event, the Nutana Women's Cashspiel where they were defeated by Lorraine Schneider. In the new year, Team Ackerman reached their third final of the season at the SaskTour Women's Players Championship, dropping an 8–7 decision to Penny Barker. Next for the team was the 2023 Saskatchewan Scotties Tournament of Hearts, which they qualified for as one of the CTRS points leaders throughout the season. After starting the event 1–2, the team won consecutive sudden-death games to qualify for the playoffs. In the 3 vs. 4 game, they gave up a steal to Sherry Anderson in an extra end to lose 8–7, eliminating them from contention. Despite her team not winning the event, Ackerman still got to represent Saskatchewan at the 2023 Scotties Tournament of Hearts as alternate for the Robyn Silvernagle rink, her first appearance at the national women's championship. At the event, the team struggled, finishing 2–6 through the round robin with wins over Alberta's Kayla Skrlik and Nunavut's Brigitte MacPhail. Team Ackerman rounded out the season at the Best of the West U30 event where they lost in the semifinals to Corryn Brown. After the season, Kya Kennedy left the team and was replaced by Ashley Thevenot at the third position.

Coming off a successful season, Team Ackerman struggled early into the 2023–24 season, failing to qualify in their first three events. Things turned around for the team in November, however, as they went undefeated to claim the Moose Jaw SaskTour Spiel and also won the Nutana SaskTour Women's Spiel later that month. In January, they won the SaskTour Players Championship to take their third tour win of the season. Having again qualified for the 2024 Saskatchewan Scotties Tournament of Hearts through CTRS points, Team Ackerman qualified as the top seeds from their pool with a 4–1 record, securing a place in the 1 vs. 2 game. There, they came from behind to defeat Nancy Martin 7–6 and qualify for the championship final. Once again facing Martin, Ackerman ensured victory for her rink with a takeout in an extra end to win the game 10–9, becoming the youngest skip to capture the Saskatchewan provincial women's title. With the win, the team earned the right to represent Saskatchewan at the 2024 Scotties Tournament of Hearts in Calgary, Alberta. Immediately, the team proved themselves to be contenders, upsetting the veteran rinks of Kaitlyn Lawes and Krista McCarville to begin the tournament with three straight wins. They then lost four of their next five games, however, finishing the event with a 4–4 record. This created a five-way tie for third with Manitoba, Northern Ontario, British Columbia and Quebec. With tiebreaker games abolished and the first tiebreaker (which was head-to-head between all tied teams) tied as well at 2–2, cumulative last stone draw distance between all the teams was used to decide who would make the playoffs. The Ackerman rink finished with a total of 575.5 but would miss the playoffs as the Lawes rink finished first with a 231.6. A month following the Scotties, Ackerman announced she was taking a break from competitive curling to pursue further education in the healthcare field.

After a two-year break, Ackerman returned to competitive play for the 2026–27 season skipping a new team of Robyn Silvernagle, Rachel Big Eagle and Mary Little.

== Personal life ==
Ackerman is currently a kinesiology student at the University of Saskatchewan.

== Teams ==
| Season | Skip | Third | Second | Lead |
|---|---|---|---|---|
| 2016–17 | Skylar Ackerman | Madison Johnson | Chantel Hoag | Samantha McLaren |
| 2017–18 | Skylar Ackerman | Madison Johnson | Chantel Hoag | Samantha McLaren |
| 2018–19 | Skylar Ackerman | Madison Johnson | Chantel Hoag | Samantha McLaren |
| 2019–20 | Skylar Ackerman | Emily Haupstein | Taylor Stremick | Abbey Johnson |
| 2020–21 | Skylar Ackerman | Emily Haupstein | Taylor Stremick | Abbey Johnson |
| 2021–22 | Emily Haupstein | Skylar Ackerman | Taylor Stremick | Abbey Johnson |
| 2022–23 | Skylar Ackerman | Kya Kennedy | Taylor Stremick | Kaylin Skinner |
| 2023–24 | Skylar Ackerman | Ashley Thevenot | Taylor Stremick | Kaylin Skinner |
| 2026–27 | Skylar Ackerman | Robyn Silvernagle | Rachel Big Eagle | Mary Little |
