= Stephanie Schmidt =

Canadian curler

- Curler
- Born: Stephanie McVicar; November 1, 1989 (age 37); Saskatoon, Saskatchewan

Team
- Curling club: Highland CC, Regina, SK
- Skip: Ashley Thevenot
- Third: Stephanie Schmidt
- Second: Taylor Stremick
- Lead: Kaylin Skinner

Curling career
- Member Association: Saskatchewan (2007–2010; 2014–present); Nova Scotia (2010–2014)
- Hearts: 3 (2015, 2020, 2022)
- Top CTRS ranking: 6th (2021–22)

Stephanie Marguerite Schmidt (born November 1, 1989, as Stephanie McVicar in Saskatoon, Saskatchewan) is a Canadian curler, artist, and designer from Regina, Saskatchewan. She currently plays third on Team Ashley Thevenot.

== Design career ==
Schmidt received a bachelor's degree in Design at Nova Scotia College of Art and Design and a minor in Illustration, completed at Rhode Island School of Design 2013.

In 2013, Schmidt would intern for the Saskatchewan Roughriders and assist in designing the 101st Grey Cup and the set of Sasktel's Rider Coaches Show.

== Curling career ==
=== Juniors ===
Schmidt made her first national curling debut skipping at the 2007 Canada Winter Games. Schmidt and team would finish 4th overall. The following year she would skip her team to another provincial title, representing Saskatchewan at the 2008 Canadian Junior Curling Championships women's event. Her team would have success at the event finishing with a round-robin record of 8–4. This was good enough to get the team into a tiebreaker situation. They would win two tiebreakers, before meeting Nova Scotia in the semi-final. After an 8–7 win, the team would move onto the final where they would meet Manitoba's Kaitlyn Lawes. After a well played game the team would claim a silver medal in the event, losing by a single point.

Schmidt would be part of the 2nd all-star team at the championship.

=== 2010–current ===
Schmidt would move to Nova Scotia for the 2010–11 curling season, where she would join Mary-Anne Arsenault's squad. The team would compete in the 2011 Nova Scotia Scotties Tournament of Hearts. They would go through round-robin with a 5–2 record, which was enough to secure second place. They would lose the semi-final to Heather Smith-Dacey who would go on to win a bronze medal at the National championship. A year later at the 2012 Nova Scotia Scotties Tournament of Hearts, the team would finish round-robin with a 4–3 record, which was enough to secure a tiebreaker. The team would end up losing the tiebreaker to Colleen Pinkney.

At the end of the 2011–12 season, Schmidt was dropped by Arsenault who teamed up with former teammate Colleen Jones. Schmidt was expected to join the team as the alternate player, but instead joined Heather Smith-Dacey as her new third.

Schmidt returned to Saskatchewan to join the Stefanie Lawton rink for the 2014–15 season. The rink won the 2015 Saskatchewan Scotties Tournament of Hearts and went on to finish fourth at the 2015 Scotties Tournament of Hearts. Schmidt left the team after the season and joined the Michelle Englot rink at second. Schmidt would not return to the Scotties Tournament of Hearts after the team lost the 3 vs. 4 page playoff game to eventual champions Jolene Campbell. Schmidt would once again chance rinks the following season and join the Breanne Knapp team at third. The rink didn't even qualify for the 2017 Saskatchewan Scotties Tournament of Hearts. Schmidt once again joined the Lawton rink the following season. They lost the tiebreaker at the 2018 Saskatchewan Scotties Tournament of Hearts and got to play in the 2017 Tour Challenge Tier 2 Grand Slam of Curling event where they lost in the quarterfinal to Jamie Sinclair. Schmidt took time off from competitive curling after the season.

After the Robyn Silvernagle rink won the 2020 Saskatchewan Scotties Tournament of Hearts, Schmidt was asked if she would be their alternate at the 2020 Scotties Tournament of Hearts. The team finished in fifth with a 6–5 record.

On March 19, 2020, it was announced that Schmidt would be forming her own team for the 2020–21 season which consisted of Brooklyn Stevenson, Jennifer Armstrong and Rachel Erickson. The team played in three local events during the abbreviated season, qualifying in one of them. After the season, Brooklyn Stevenson left the team. Schmidt, Armstrong and Erickson then added Chelsea Carey and Jolene Campbell for the 2021–22 season, shifting Schmidt to second.

The new Team Carey found success in just their second event together, going undefeated to claim the Craven SPORTS Services Curling Classic tour event title. They then made the semifinals of the 2021 Curlers Corner Autumn Gold Curling Classic where they were eliminated by Tabitha Peterson. At the event, however, they were able to defeat the likes of Rachel Homan, Jennifer Jones and Jamie Sinclair en route to the semifinals. They also qualified for the playoffs at the Boundary Ford Curling Classic, SaskTour Women's Moose Jaw, Red Deer Curling Classic and the DeKalb Superspiel, however, were not able to reach the final in any of the four events. Their next event was the 2022 Saskatchewan Scotties Tournament of Hearts, which they entered as the top ranked team. Team Carey qualified through the A-side of the tournament with a perfect 3–0 record. This earned them a spot in the 1 vs. 2 page playoff game where they defeated Penny Barker. In the final, they once again faced the Barker rink. This time, Team Barker would win the match 7–5, despite Team Carey beating them in both the A Final and 1 vs. 2 page playoff game. Despite this, they still qualified for the 2022 Scotties Tournament of Hearts as Wild Card #2 after Curling Canada used the same format from the 2021 event due to the pandemic. At the championship, the team finished with a 4–4 round-robin record, not advancing to the playoff round. Team Carey wrapped up their season at the 2022 Players' Championship where they missed the playoffs.

On April 3, 2022, the team announced that they would be disbanding at the end of the 2021–22 season. Schmidt and Armstrong later announced that they would be joining Nancy Martin and Krysten Karwacki on a newly formed team for the 2022–23 season. Martin would skip the team, with Schmidt playing third, Armstrong at second and Karwacki at lead.

== Personal life ==
Schmidt currently lives in Regina, Saskatchewan. She is married to Canadian curler Aryn Schmidt, and has two children. She is employed as a designer/small business owner.

== Teams ==
Season	Skip	Third	Second	Lead	Alternate
2007–08	Stephanie McVicar	Kari Kennedy	Ashley Gregoire	Cori Debert	
2009–10	Stephanie McVicar	Kari Kennedy	Kelsey Waker	Cori Debert	
2010–11	Mary-Anne Arsenault	Stephanie McVicar	Jenn Baxter	Kelly Backman	
2011–12	Mary-Anne Arsenault	Stephanie McVicar	Kim Kelly	Jenn Baxter	
2012–13	Heather Smith-Dacey	Stephanie McVicar	Blisse Joyce	Teri Udle	
2014–15	Stefanie Lawton	Sherry Anderson	Stephanie Schmidt	Marliese Kasner	
2015–16	Michelle Englot	Candace Chisholm	Stephanie Schmidt	Brooklyn Lemon	
2016–17	Breanne Knapp	Stephanie Schmidt	Brooklyn Lemon	Cori Debert	
2017–18	Stefanie Lawton	Stephanie Schmidt	Cristina Goertzen	Brooklyn Lemon	
2020–21	Stephanie Schmidt	Brooklyn Stevenson	Jennifer Armstrong	Rachel Erickson	
2021–22	Chelsea Carey	Jolene Campbell	Stephanie Schmidt	Jennifer Armstrong	Rachel Erickson
2023–24	Stephanie Schmidt (Fourth)	Sara England	Ashley Williamson	Michelle Englot (Skip)	
2024–25	Stephanie Schmidt (Fourth)	Sara England	Ashley Williamson	Michelle Englot (Skip)	
2025–26	Ashley Thevenot	Stephanie Schmidt	Taylor Stremick	Kaylin Skinner	
2026–27	Ashley Thevenot	Stephanie Schmidt	Taylor Stremick	Kaylin Skinner	
