= Ashley Thevenot =

Canadian curler (born 1998)

- Curler
- Born: December 8, 1998 (age 27); Saskatoon, Saskatchewan

Team
- Curling club: Nutana CC, Saskatoon, SK
- Skip: Ashley Thevenot
- Third: Stephanie Schmidt
- Second: Taylor Stremick
- Lead: Kaylin Skinner

Curling career
- Member Association: Saskatchewan
- Hearts: 1 (2024)
- Top CTRS ranking: 12th (2023–24)

Ashley Thevenot (English: /ˈtɛvənoʊ/, French: [tevəno]; born December 8, 1998, in Saskatoon) is a Canadian curler from Warman, Saskatchewan. She currently skips her own team out of the Nutana Curling Club.

== Career ==
Thevenot skipped her own team throughout the entirety of her junior career. During the 2018–19 season, her team of Paige Engel, Kaylin Skinner and Mary Engel had a breakthrough performance at the Regina Callie Rockoberfest women's event, going undefeated to win the event title. They later had their best performance at the Saskatchewan junior championship, advancing through a tiebreaker before losing to Skylar Ackerman in a page play-in game. The next season, her team, now with third Rachel Erickson in place of Skinner, won the Saskatchewan junior women's championship, defeating Ackerman in both the 1 vs. 2 and championship games. This qualified the rink for the 2020 Canadian Junior Curling Championships in Langley, British Columbia. Through the round robin and championship pools, the team finished in seventh place with a 5–5 record, just one game short of reaching a tiebreaker.

Following the conclusion of her junior career, Thevenot did not play competitively in the women's ranks until the 2023–24 season when she joined the Skylar Ackerman rink at third. The team also included second Taylor Stremick and lead Kaylin Skinner. After failing to qualify in their first three events, the team turned things around in November as they went undefeated to claim the Moose Jaw SaskTour Spiel and also won the Nutana SaskTour Women's Spiel later that month. In January, they won the SaskTour Players Championship to take their third tour win of the season. Having qualified for the 2024 Saskatchewan Scotties Tournament of Hearts through CTRS points, Team Ackerman qualified as the top seeds from their pool with a 4–1 record, securing a place in the 1 vs. 2 game. There, they came from behind to defeat Nancy Martin 7–6 and qualify for the championship final. Once again facing Martin, Ackerman made a takeout in an extra end to win the game 10–9 and capture the Saskatchewan provincial women's title for the team. With the win, the team earned the right to represent Saskatchewan at the 2024 Scotties Tournament of Hearts in Calgary, Alberta, Thevenot's first appearance at the national women's championship. Immediately, the team proved themselves to be contenders, upsetting the veteran rinks of Kaitlyn Lawes and Krista McCarville to begin the tournament with three straight wins. They then lost four of their next five games, however, finishing the event with a 4–4 record. This created a five-way tie for third with Manitoba, Northern Ontario, British Columbia and Quebec. With tiebreaker games abolished and the first tiebreaker (which was head-to-head between all tied teams) tied as well at 2–2, cumulative last stone draw distance between all the teams was used to decide who would make the playoffs. The Ackerman rink finished with a total of 575.5 but would miss the playoffs as the Lawes rink finished first with a 231.6. A month following the Scotties, Ackerman announced she was taking a break from competitive curling to pursue further education in the healthcare field. Thevenot then moved up to skip with Brittany Tran joining at third for the 2024–25 season.

== Personal life ==
Thevenot is currently a registered veterinary technologist at the Warman Small Animal Hospital. She previously attended the University of Saskatchewan studying animal bioscience.

== Teams ==
Season	Skip	Third	Second	Lead
2015–16	Ashley Thevenot	Paige Engel	Layne Engel	Mary Engel
2016–17	Ashley Thevenot	Paige Engel	Layne Engel	Mary Engel
2017–18	Ashley Thevenot	Paige Engel	Layne Engel	Mary Engel
2018–19	Ashley Thevenot	Paige Engel	Kaylin Skinner	Mary Engel
2019–20	Ashley Thevenot	Rachel Erickson	Paige Engel	Mary Engel
2023–24	Skylar Ackerman	Ashley Thevenot	Taylor Stremick	Kaylin Skinner
2024–25	Ashley Thevenot	Brittany Tran	Taylor Stremick	Kaylin Skinner
2025–26	Ashley Thevenot	Stephanie Schmidt	Taylor Stremick	Kaylin Skinner
2026–27	Ashley Thevenot	Stephanie Schmidt	Taylor Stremick	Kaylin Skinner
