= Kaylin Skinner =

Canadian curler

- Curler
- Born: January 7, 1998 (age 28); Saskatoon, Saskatchewan

Team
- Curling club: Nutana CC, Saskatoon, SK
- Skip: Ashley Thevenot
- Third: Stephanie Schmidt
- Second: Taylor Stremick
- Lead: Kaylin Skinner

Curling career
- Member Association: Saskatchewan
- Hearts: 1 (2024)
- Top CTRS ranking: 12th (2023–24)

Kaylin Mattern (née Skinner; born January 7, 1998) is a Canadian curler from Saskatoon, Saskatchewan. She currently plays lead on Team Ashley Thevenot.

== Career ==
Skinner played second during her junior career on a team skipped by Hanna Anderson. During the 2017–18 season, the team had a deep run at the Saskatchewan provincial junior championship, going 4–1 through the round robin and winning a tiebreaker to advance. The team then won the 3 vs. 4 game before losing to Chaelynn Kitz in the semifinal, ending their run. For her final year of juniors, Skinner joined the Ashley Thevenot rink which also included Paige and Mary Engel. At the Regina Callie Rockoberfest women's event, the team had a breakthrough performance, going undefeated to win the event title. They later qualified for the playoffs at the junior provincials before losing to Skylar Ackerman in a page play-in game.

Out of juniors, Skinner joined the Ashley Howard rink as their lead for the 2019–20 season with sisters Kourtney and Krista Fesser playing third and second respectively. On tour, the team found success at the Medicine Hat Charity Classic and the Moose Jaw SWCT Event, advancing to the semifinals in both. In December, they finished second at the Saskatchewan Women's Challenge, the qualifying event for the 2020 Saskatchewan Scotties Tournament of Hearts. This earned them a spot in the provincial championship where after losing their first game, they rattled off four straight wins to advance to the playoffs. They then lost consecutive games to Robyn Silvernagle and Sherry Anderson, settling for third.

Despite the COVID-19 pandemic cancelling most of the 2020–21 season, Team Howard was able to play in three domestic events on the Saskatchewan tour. In all three, the team went undefeated, winning all thirteen games they played. Due to the COVID-19 pandemic in Saskatchewan, the 2021 Saskatchewan Scotties Tournament of Hearts was cancelled. Team Sherry Anderson was then invited to represent Saskatchewan at the 2021 Scotties Tournament of Hearts, as they had the most points from the 2019–20 and 2020–21 seasons combined, which they accepted.

Back full-time for the 2021–22 season, Team Howard reached the playoffs three consecutive times to begin the season, losing in the final of the Craven Sports Services Icebreaker to Sherry Anderson. Due to the COVID-19 pandemic in Canada, the qualification process for the 2021 Canadian Olympic Curling Trials had to be modified to qualify enough teams for the championship. In these modifications, Curling Canada created the 2021 Canadian Curling Pre-Trials Direct-Entry Event, an event where eight teams would compete to try to earn one of two spots into the 2021 Canadian Olympic Curling Pre-Trials. Team Howard qualified for the Pre-Trials Direct-Entry Event as the eighth seed. The team finished 2–3 at the event, not advancing to the playoff round. Back on tour, the team won the last chance qualifier for the 2022 Saskatchewan Scotties Tournament of Hearts. In the new year, they finished 3–3 at the provincial championship, being eliminated by Robyn Silvernagle in the C qualifier game. Skinner ended her season at the 2022 Best of the West where her team, now led by Kourtney Fesser, failed to qualify. Team Howard disbanded following the season.

Now a free agent, Skinner joined the Skylar Ackerman rink for the 2022–23 season. The team also included Kya Kennedy at third and Taylor Stremick at second. In their first event together, the team reached the final of the U25 NextGen Classic where they came up short to Serena Gray-Withers. They also reached the final of their next event, the Nutana Women's Cashspiel where they were defeated by Lorraine Schneider. In the new year, Team Ackerman reached their third final of the season at the SaskTour Women's Players Championship, dropping an 8–7 decision to Penny Barker. Next for the team was the 2023 Saskatchewan Scotties Tournament of Hearts, which they qualified for as one of the CTRS points leaders throughout the season. After starting the event 1–2, the team won consecutive sudden-death games to qualify for the playoffs. In the 3 vs. 4 game, they gave up a steal to Sherry Anderson in an extra end to lose 8–7, eliminating them from contention. They rounded out the season at the Best of the West where they lost in the semifinals to Corryn Brown. After the season, Kya Kennedy left the team and was replaced by Ashley Thevenot at the third position.

Coming off a successful season, Team Ackerman struggled early into the 2023–24 season, failing to qualify in their first three events. Things turned around for the team in November, however, as they went undefeated to claim the Moose Jaw SaskTour Spiel and also won the Nutana SaskTour Women's Spiel later that month. In January, they won the SaskTour Players Championship to take their third tour win of the season. Having again qualified for the 2024 Saskatchewan Scotties Tournament of Hearts through CTRS points, Team Ackerman qualified as the top seeds from their pool with a 4–1 record, securing a place in the 1 vs. 2 game. There, they came from behind to defeat Nancy Martin 7–6 and qualify for the championship final. Once again facing Martin, Ackerman made a takeout in an extra end to win the game 10–9 and capture the Saskatchewan provincial women's title for the team. With the win, the team earned the right to represent Saskatchewan at the 2024 Scotties Tournament of Hearts in Calgary, Alberta, Skinner's first appearance at the national women's championship. Immediately, the team proved themselves to be contenders, upsetting the veteran rinks of Kaitlyn Lawes and Krista McCarville to begin the tournament with three straight wins. They then lost four of their next five games, however, finishing the event with a 4–4 record. This created a five-way tie for third with Manitoba, Northern Ontario, British Columbia and Quebec. With tiebreaker games abolished and the first tiebreaker (which was head-to-head between all tied teams) tied as well at 2–2, cumulative last stone draw distance between all the teams was used to decide who would make the playoffs. The Ackerman rink finished with a total of 575.5 but would miss the playoffs as the Lawes rink finished first with a 231.6. A month following the Scotties, Ackerman announced she was taking a break from competitive curling to pursue further education in the healthcare field. The team's third Ashley Thevenot then moved up to skip with Brittany Tran joining at third for the 2024–25 season.

== Personal life ==
Skinner is employed as an auditor at KPMG Saskatoon. She previously attended the University of Saskatchewan. She is married to fellow curler Joshua Mattern.

== Teams ==
Season	Skip	Third	Second	Lead
2015–16	Hanna Anderson	Amanda Waterfield	Kaylin Skinner	Jenna Golanowski
2016–17	Hanna Anderson	Stephanie Thompson	Kaylin Skinner	Jenna Golanowski
2017–18	Hanna Anderson	Stephanie Thompson	Kaylin Skinner	Jessica Thompson
2018–19	Ashley Thevenot	Paige Engel	Kaylin Skinner	Mary Engel
2019–20	Ashley Howard	Kourtney Fesser	Krista Fesser	Kaylin Skinner
2020–21	Ashley Howard	Kourtney Fesser	Krista Fesser	Kaylin Skinner
2021–22	Ashley Howard	Kourtney Fesser	Krista Fesser	Kaylin Skinner
2022–23	Skylar Ackerman	Kya Kennedy	Taylor Stremick	Kaylin Skinner
2023–24	Skylar Ackerman	Ashley Thevenot	Taylor Stremick	Kaylin Skinner
2024–25	Ashley Thevenot	Brittany Tran	Taylor Stremick	Kaylin Skinner
2025–26	Ashley Thevenot	Stephanie Schmidt	Taylor Stremick	Kaylin Skinner
2026–27	Ashley Thevenot	Stephanie Schmidt	Taylor Stremick	Kaylin Skinner
