= Taylor Stremick =

Canadian curler

- Curler
- Born: November 13, 2000 (age 26); Regina, Saskatchewan

Team
- Curling club: Highland CC, Regina, SK
- Skip: Ashley Thevenot
- Third: Stephanie Schmidt
- Second: Taylor Stremick
- Lead: Kaylin Skinner

Curling career
- Member Association: Saskatchewan
- Hearts: 1 (2024)
- Top CTRS ranking: 12th (2023–24)

Taylor Stremick (born November 13, 2000) is a Canadian curler from Regina, Saskatchewan. She currently plays second on Team Ashley Thevenot.

== Career ==
While in juniors, Stremick played for several different skips but never managed to find success at the provincial level. In 2020, she had her best run at the event while playing second for the Skylar Ackerman rink. Through the round robin, the team finished in first with a 6–1 record, earning a spot in the 1 vs. 2 game. There, they lost to Ashley Thevenot 6–4 but bounced back with an 11–6 victory over Krystal Englot in the semifinal game. In the provincial final, they were defeated once again by the Thevenot rink in a 7–5 decision. Despite not qualifying for the 2020 Canadian Junior Curling Championships, Stremick did find success at the U Sport level as her Regina Cougars team qualified for the 2020 U Sports/Curling Canada University Curling Championships. Playing lead on the team skipped by Stasia Wisniewski, the Regina squad finished in seventh place at the championship with a 2–5 record, defeating the McMaster Marauders and the Brandon Bobcats.

During the abbreviated 2020–21 season, Team Ackerman played in three events. After failing to reach the playoffs twice, they made the semifinals of the SWCT South Moose Jaw event where they were defeated by Amber Holland. The following season, the team altered their lineup, moving third Emily Haupstein to skip and Ackerman to third. The team did not find much success, failing to qualify in any of their four events. At the provincial junior championship, they failed to reach the playoffs.

Aged out of juniors, Stremick and Ackerman formed a new team with Kya Kennedy and Kaylin Skinner for the 2022–23 season. In their first event together, the team reached the final of the U25 NextGen Classic where they came up short to Serena Gray-Withers. They also reached the final of their next event, the Nutana Women's Cashspiel where they were defeated by Lorraine Schneider. In the new year, Team Ackerman reached their third final of the season at the SaskTour Women's Players Championship, dropping an 8–7 decision to Penny Barker. Next for the team was the 2023 Saskatchewan Scotties Tournament of Hearts, which they qualified for as one of the CTRS points leaders throughout the season. After starting the event 1–2, the team won consecutive sudden-death games to qualify for the playoffs. In the 3 vs. 4 game, they gave up a steal to Sherry Anderson in an extra end to lose 8–7, eliminating them from contention. They rounded out the season at the Best of the West U30 event where they lost in the semifinals to Corryn Brown. After the season, Kya Kennedy left the team and was replaced by Ashley Thevenot at the third position. Also during the 2022–23 season, Stremick's Regina Cougars rink led by Krystal Englot reached the final of the 2022 World University Games Qualifier where they lost to the Alberta Pandas Abby Marks.

Coming off a successful season, Team Ackerman struggled early into the 2023–24 season, failing to qualify in their first three events. Things turned around for the team in November, however, as they went undefeated to claim the Moose Jaw SaskTour Spiel and also won the Nutana SaskTour Women's Spiel later that month. In January, they won the SaskTour Players Championship to take their third tour win of the season. Having again qualified for the 2024 Saskatchewan Scotties Tournament of Hearts through CTRS points, Team Ackerman qualified as the top seeds from their pool with a 4–1 record, securing a place in the 1 vs. 2 game. There, they came from behind to defeat Nancy Martin 7–6 and qualify for the championship final. Once again facing Martin, Ackerman made a takeout in an extra end to win the game 10–9 and capture the Saskatchewan provincial women's title for the team. With the win, the team earned the right to represent Saskatchewan at the 2024 Scotties Tournament of Hearts in Calgary, Alberta, Stremick's first appearance at the national women's championship. Immediately, the team proved themselves to be contenders, upsetting the veteran rinks of Kaitlyn Lawes and Krista McCarville to begin the tournament with three straight wins. They then lost four of their next five games, however, finishing the event with a 4–4 record. This created a five-way tie for third with Manitoba, Northern Ontario, British Columbia and Quebec. With tiebreaker games abolished and the first tiebreaker (which was head-to-head between all tied teams) tied as well at 2–2, cumulative last stone draw distance between all the teams was used to decide who would make the playoffs. The Ackerman rink finished with a total of 575.5 but would miss the playoffs as the Lawes rink finished first with a 231.6. A month following the Scotties, Ackerman announced she was taking a break from competitive curling to pursue further education in the healthcare field. The team's third Ashley Thevenot then moved up to skip with Brittany Tran joining at third for the 2024–25 season.

== Personal life ==
Stremick is currently a master's student in school and counselling psychology at the University of Saskatchewan. She is also an administrative assistant at Wildflowers Therapy. She previously attended the University of Regina and Miller Comprehensive High School.

== Teams ==
Season	Skip	Third	Second	Lead
2015–16	Eva Grabarczyk	Tegan Zanki	Taylor Stremick	Stephanie Bukurak
2016–17	Tegan Zanki	Taylor Stremick	Jillian Schneider	Stephanie Bukurak
2017–18	Tegan Zanki	Taylor Stremick	Cassidy Regush	Stephanie Bukurak
2018–19	Cassidy Regush	Taylor Stremick	Kelly Kay	Stephanie Bukurak
2019–20	Skylar Ackerman	Emily Haupstein	Taylor Stremick	Abbey Johnson
2020–21	Skylar Ackerman	Emily Haupstein	Taylor Stremick	Abbey Johnson
2021–22	Emily Haupstein	Skylar Ackerman	Taylor Stremick	Abbey Johnson
2022–23	Skylar Ackerman	Kya Kennedy	Taylor Stremick	Kaylin Skinner
2023–24	Skylar Ackerman	Ashley Thevenot	Taylor Stremick	Kaylin Skinner
2024–25	Ashley Thevenot	Brittany Tran	Taylor Stremick	Kaylin Skinner
2025–26	Ashley Thevenot	Stephanie Schmidt	Taylor Stremick	Kaylin Skinner
2026–27	Ashley Thevenot	Stephanie Schmidt	Taylor Stremick	Kaylin Skinner
