= List of teams in the 2022–23 curling season =

Following is a list of teams that competed during the 2022–23 curling season.

== Men ==
As of May 7, 2023

Skip	Third	Second	Lead	Alternate	Locale
Tetsuro Shimizu (Fourth)	Haruto Ouchi	Shinya Abe (Skip)	Minori Suzuki	Sota Tsuruga	Sapporo, Japan
Cole Adams	Riley Helston	Benjamin Helston	Braden Pelech		Calgary, Alberta
Brian Adams Jr.	Mark Koivula	Colin Koivula	Joel Adams		Thunder Bay, Ontario
Rob Ainsley	Dave Ellis	Graeme Robson	Darren Karn		Toronto, Ontario
Rhogan Aitken	Keswick Pearson	Hal Jenkins	Gregory Gendron		Australia
Guy Algot	Rodney Ouellette	Gryffen Algot	Justin Runciman		Sherwood Park, Alberta
Ryo Aoki	Rio Hayashi	Takuto Ouchi	Naoki Kanazawa		Tokoro, Japan
Alexandros Arampatzis	Dionysios Karakostas	Efstrantios Kokkinellis	Georgios Vakirtzis	Nikolaos Zacharias	Athens, Greece
Lars Aspeli	Njal Kongsund	Harald Dæhlin	Heine Buraas	Jakob Moen Bekken	Lillehammer, Norway
Félix Asselin	Martin Crête	Émile Asselin	Jean-François Trépanier		Montreal, Quebec
Alain Aumont	Rene Roy	Eric Houle	Denis Thibault		Val-d'Or, Quebec
Ray Baker	Jason Yates	Dwight Bottrell	Robbie Fisher		Dauphin, Manitoba
James Ballance	Lowell Whittmire	Ethan Drysdale	Neil Donovan		Okotoks, Alberta
Greg Balsdon	Jordan Keon	Curtis Samoy	Trevor Talbott	Michael Keon	Richmond Hill, Ontario
Christian Bangerter	Daniel Inversini	Kim-Lloyd Sciboz	Antoine Liaudet		Bern, Switzerland
Zane Bartlett	Kyle Habkirk	Derek Chandler	Connor Croteau		Victoria, British Columbia
Mathieu Beaufort	Maxime Benoit	Pier-Olivier Blain	Patrick Doyon	Alexandre Comeau	Sorel-Tracy, Quebec
Nolan Blaeser (Fourth)	Kaiden Beck (Skip)	Nolan Beck	Koen Hampshire		New Westminster, British Columbia
Adam Bédard	Mathis Arsenault	Zakary Rose	Nathan Gendron	Gabriel Audette	Rouyn-Noranda, Quebec
Patrick Bédard	Sylvain Lelievre	Solange Desjardins	Patrick Charron		Val-d'Or, Quebec
David Beesley	Jamie Rankin	Callum McLain	Kyle McLain		Edinburgh, Scotland
Martin Begin	Mathieu Tremblay	Thierry Marcotte-Naud	Pierre Gadbois		Laval, Quebec
Sylvain Bellavance	Andre Bellavance	Stephane Laforge	Dan Gilbert		Boucherville, Quebec
Arild Berdal	Sigmund Ellingson	Svein Nordlomme	Sverre Heimdal	Frode Østerlie	Trondheim, Norway
Daymond Bernath	Bryden Tessier	David Baum	Jack Reid		Saskatoon, Saskatchewan
Roger Bertrand	Martin Patry	Cedric LaBonte	Luc Ouellette		Buckingham, Quebec
Paulo Bienvenue	Yan Morissette	Pierre Bienvenue	–		Val-d'Or, Quebec
Daniel Birchard	Kelly Fordyce	Brody Moore	Andrew Peck	Paola Aquila	Winnipeg, Manitoba
Richard Faguy (Fourth)	Louis Biron (Skip)	Dan Gilbert	Andre Gagné		Buckingham, Quebec
Kjetil Bjørke	Tor Fredriksen	Håvard Lundhaug	Johan Lindström		Bygdøy, Norway
Blaine Black	Jason Larence	Barrie Johnstone	Al Pratt		Penticton, British Columbia
Pierre Blanchard	Mario Dion	Jocelyn Lavoie	Kurtis Hanna		Noranda, Quebec
Matthew Blandford	Corey Leach	Cody Leach	Kyle Leach		Slave Lake, Alberta
Nolan Blasser	Kaden Beck	Nolan Beck	Koen Hampshire		New Westminster, British Columbia
Sean Blythe	John Blythe	Wade O'Reilly	Elliott Davis		Ottawa, Ontario
Trevor Bonot	Mike McCarville	Jordan Potts	Kurtis Byrd		Thunder Bay, Ontario
Gregory Bornais	Normand Bornais	Samuel Bornais	François Bornais	David Jutras	Trois-Rivières, Quebec
Brendan Bottcher	Marc Kennedy	Brett Gallant	Ben Hebert		Calgary, Alberta
Jim Brackett	Joe Griffore	Bob Devolder	Brad Way		Chatham, Ontario
Lars Brauchli	Leon Wittich	Kenjo Von Allmen	Livio Ernst		Wildhaus, Switzerland
Zachary Brenden	Kyan Ponzio	Kjell Olmanson	Owen Nelson		(United States) Bismarck, North Dakota
Ethan Brewster	Sam Lynch	Marc Lyon	Luke Perras	Fraser Riddoch	Aberdeen, Scotland
Chris Bridges	Shane Freeman	Derwyn Hammond	Brian English	Gerald Gourley	Rivers, Manitoba
Greg Bridges	Korey Donnelly	Derek Picketts	Richard Cooper		Russell, Ontario
Jed Brundidge	Timothy Hodek	Cameron Rittenour	Kyle Richards		(United States) Saint Paul, Minnesota
Michael Brunner	Romano Meier	Anthony Petoud	Marcel Käufeler		Bern, Switzerland
Carter Bryant	Samuel Guilbeault	Dylan Byrne	Matthew Abrams		Guelph, Ontario
Cameron Bryce	Duncan Menzies	Luke Carson	Robin McCall		Stirling, Scotland
Josh Bryden	Brecklin Gervais	Carter Williamson	Adam Bukurak		Regina, Saskatchewan
Randy Bryden	Troy Robinson	Russ Bryden	Chris Semenchuck		Regina, Saskatchewan
Bryan Burgess	Mike Vale	Tristan Vale	Bill Peloza		Thunder Bay, Ontario
Dallas Burgess	Jackson Dubinsky	Matt Duizer	Owen Riches	Adam Wiersema	Thunder Bay, Ontario
Peter Burgess	Andrew Burgess	Todd Burgess	Kelly Mittelstadt		Truro, Nova Scotia
Kinley Burton	Justice Jacques	Colby Yacey	Adam Eisenheimer		Edmonton, Alberta
Ted Butler	Richard Faguy	Jean Pierre Croteau	Michel Laroche		Buckingham, Quebec
Loris Caccivio	Timo Traub	Timon Biehle	Nevio Caccivio		Basel, Switzerland
Braden Calvert	Kyle Kurz	Ian McMillan	Rob Gordon		Winnipeg, Manitoba
Mac Calwell	Kurt Armstrong	Morgan Calwell	Riley Calwell		Ottawa, Ontario
Gavin Cameron	Cameron Harkins	Jonathan Buchanan	Lewis Logan		Moray, Scotland
Jason Camm	Ian Dickie	Zack Shurtleff	Punit Sthankiya		Cornwall, Ontario
Evan Carlson	Ben Peters	Evan Dauernheim	William Mountfield	Henrik Carlson	(United States) Laurel, Maryland
Kody Carr	Tyler Stewart	Travis Potter	James Childs		Thunder Bay, Ontario
Reid Carruthers	Jason Gunnlaugson (2022); Brad Jacobs (2023)	Derek Samagalski	Connor Njegovan		Winnipeg, Manitoba
Orrin Carson	Logan Carson	Archie Hyslop	Charlie Gibb		Dumfries, Scotland
Michael Carss	Sam Wills	Aaron Shutra	Mat Ring		Saskatoon, Saskatchewan
Adam Casey	Craig Savill	Steve Burgess	Robbie Doherty		Charlottetown, Prince Edward Island
Daniel Casper	Luc Violette	Ben Richardson	Chase Sinnett		(United States) Chaska, Minnesota
Nicholas Cenzalli	Daniel Laufer	Shaheen Bassiri	Dylan Ciapka	Connor Hardin	(United States) Wayland, Massachusetts
Corey Chambers	Daley Peters	Julien Leduc	Brendan Bilawka		Winnipeg, Manitoba
Alex Champ	Charlie Richard	Terry Arnold	Scott Clinton		Kitchener–Waterloo, Ontario
Jordan Chandler	Matt Dumontelle	Kyle Chandler	Tom Cull		Little Current, Ontario
Jason Chang	Justin Chen	Martin Yan	Woody Cheng		Hong Kong
Pierre Chayer	Stephen Ratte	Patrice Boucher	–		Quebec
Ethan Chisamore-Johnston	Zachary Huffman	Shae Simonson	Abraham Wan		Ottawa, Ontario
Eddie Chow	Damian Pile	Samuelle Masse	Kevin Garand		Montreal, Quebec
Fraser Clark	Cameron Clark	Martin Gregory	Daniel Arrandale		Kent, England
Mark Clarke	Roger Hogle	Arlen Hall	Amos Hogle	Dustin Phillips	Dalmeny, Saskatchewan
Bryan Cochrane	Ian MacAulay	Eddie MacKenzie	Jeremy MacAulay		Cornwall, Prince Edward Island
Giacomo Colli	Alberto Zisa	Francesco De Zanna	Simone Piffer		Cortina d'Ampezzo, Italy
Dave Collyer	Scott Ray	Mike Collyer	Cody Harder		Belleville, Ontario
Cameron MacKenzie (Fourth)	Travis Colter (Skip)	Ian Juurlink	Robby McLean		Halifax, Nova Scotia
Scott Comfort	Brennen Jones	Byron Moffatt	Malcolm Vanstone		Wadena, Saskatchewan
Nicholas Connolly	Evan Workin	Chris Bond	Nathan Parry		(United States) Seattle, Washington
Al Corbeil	Willie MacPherson	John Glass	Tom Cunningham		Stroud, Ontario
Owen Fenske (Fourth)	Beau Cornelson (Skip)	Hunter Reese	Nathan Kelba		Camrose, Alberta
Jim Cotter	Grant Olsen	Andrew Nerpin	Rick Sawatsky		Vernon, British Columbia
Vincent Courteau	Denis St-Amour	Dany Beaudoin	–		Outaouais, Quebec
Wes Craig	Steve Waatainen	Keith Clarke	Craig Burton		Nanaimo, British Columbia
James Craik	Mark Watt	Angus Bryce	Blair Haswell		Stirling, Scotland
Ross Craik	Scott Hyslop	Struan Carson	Jack Carrick		Stirling, Scotland
Bruno Crepeault	Pascal Fradette	Serge Boulanger	Yannick Letourneau		Val-d'Or, Quebec
Warren Cross	Tyler Pfiffer	Morgan Van Doesburg	Mike Lambert		Edmonton, Alberta
Evan Crough	Garrett Johnston	Ky Macaulay	Reece Brigley		Okotoks, Alberta
Dan Crouse	Kevin Lunney	David DeAdder	Mike Allain		Moncton, New Brunswick
Paul Cseke	Corey Chester	Jay Wakefield	Ty Russell		Victoria, British Columbia
Zsolt Kiss (Fourth)	Kristóf Czermann (Skip)	Dávid Balázs	Callum MacFarlane	Ottó Kalocsay	Budapest, Hungary
Brecht Bertels (Fourth)	Sebastián Dalle (Skip)	Thomas Bertels	Kevin Meuldermans		Zemst, Belgium
Colton Daly	David Jones	Brendan Craig	Ryan Brown		Georgetown, Ontario
Claude DaPrato	Sylvain Poirier	Gabriel Fleurent	Ted Decontie		Outaouais, Quebec
Flemming Davanger	Bent Ånund Ramsfjell	Ole Davanger	Lars Vågberg	Espen de Lange	Jar, Norway
Cameron de Jong	Matt Tolley	Erik Colwell	John Slattery		Penticton, British Columbia
Vitor de Melo	Nuno Rodrigues	Kyron Suhan	Arthur Camelo		São Paulo, Brazil
Nick Deagle	Jason vanVonderen	Rob Phillips	Ryan Sperry		Bridgewater, Nova Scotia
Tetsuya Degawa	Yusaku Nara	Hiroki Oka	Hideta Ohtake		Kantō, Japan
D'arcy Delorey	Pat Cove	Alexander Brodeur	Dallas Weaver		Hay River, Northwest Territories
Dylan Derksen	Logan Sawicki	Tyler Derksen	Gavin Martens		Martensville, Saskatchewan
Dayna Deruelle	Brent Ross	Ryan Werenich	Shawn Kaufman		Harriston, Ontario
Andre Desgagnes	Stéphane Roy	Dan Gilbert	Jacques Simard		Saguenay, Quebec
Robert Desjardins	François Gionest	Pierre-Luc Morissette	René Dubois		Quebec, Quebec
Pierre Desrochers	Preston Stobbe	John Hirsch	David Reid		Sherwood Park, Alberta
Daniel Desrosiers	Reginald Bouchard	Peter Prevost	Benoit Pauze		Outaouais, Quebec
Richard Dick	Billy-Joe Dick	Jess Franklin	Don Henry		Winnipeg, Manitoba
Sonny DiFranco	Hunter Leclair	Jacob Pierunek	Joe Stachon		Manotick, Ontario
Jacob Dobson	Noah Garner	Daniel Del Conte	Nolan Galardo		Burlington, Ontario
Jonathon Doust	Brad Scott	Wayne Griffiths	Philip Collins		Australia
Ghislain Doyon	Jean-Yves Lemay	Sylvain Dicaire	Sylvain Allard		Val-d'Or, Quebec
Matthew Drewitz	Adam Drewitz	Caden Snow	Jared Tessier		Saskatoon, Saskatchewan
Korey Dropkin	Andrew Stopera	Mark Fenner	Thomas Howell		(United States) Duluth, Minnesota
Robin Duguay	Terry Weatherton	Olivier Blanchard-Pelletier	Eric Periard		Buckingham, Quebec
Cale Dunbar	Shayne MacGranachan	Kyle Sambrook	Chris Campbell		Brandon, Manitoba
Hunter Dundas	Ethan Marshall	Mike Marshall	Kieran Baron		Brandon, Manitoba
Scott Dunnam	Cody Clouser	Lance Wheeler	Andrew Dunnam		(United States) Philadelphia, Pennsylvania
Matt Dunstone	B. J. Neufeld	Colton Lott	Ryan Harnden		Winnipeg, Manitoba
Matt Dupuis	Charles Wert	Jon King	Sam Mainville		Cornwall, Ontario
Denis Duval	Guy Grignon	Yvan Desrochers	Danny Burbridge		Val-d'Or, Quebec
Oliver Echenje	Haggai Ogak	Simon Karanja	Victor Obiero	Stanley Mukuba	Nairobi, Kenya
Logan Ede	Brayden Grindheim	Michael Hom	Austin Krupski		Martensville, Saskatchewan
Jonas Eden	Mats Bernhardsson	Håkan Westin	Henrik Alstersjo	Olof Magnusson	Gothenburg, Sweden
Niklas Edin	Oskar Eriksson	Rasmus Wranå	Christoffer Sundgren		Karlstad, Sweden
Zach Eldridge	Chris Jeffrey	Ronnie Burgess	Brody Hanson		Fredericton, New Brunswick
John Epping	Mat Camm	Pat Janssen	Scott Chadwick		Toronto, Ontario
Eskild Eriksen	Haakon Horvli	Hogne Lyngvold	Matias Eggen		Trondheim, Norway
Johnny Eriksson	Markus Sund	Mats Svedberg	Pea Andersson		Sala, Sweden
Bryce Everist	Paul Dexter	Chris MacRae	Taylor Ardiel		Halifax, Nova Scotia
Wayne Ewasko	Doug May	Lorne Ryall	Gordon Stelmack		Beausejour, Manitoba
Balázs Fóti (Fourth)	György Deák	Gábor Észöl (Skip)	Támas Szabad		Budapest, Hungary
Calder Fadden	Coburn Fadden	Christian Klein-Beekman	Maguire Williams		Kamloops, British Columbia
Richard Faguy	Robin Duguay	Eric Periard	William Boisvert		Buckingham, Quebec
Alf Kristian Fahle	Christian Claussen	Marcus Wolan	Brage Fagervoll	Nils Utness	Trondheim, Norway
Travis Fanset	Aaron Squires	Craig Van Ymeren	Scott Brandon	Chad Allen	St. Thomas, Ontario
Paul Fantie	Geoff Reid	David Fleury	Martin Hamm		Quebec
Garret Fedak	Kaden Fedak	Nathan Zuchkan	Darcy McLean	Chad Subulsky	Foam Lake, Saskatchewan
Fei Xueqing	Guan Tianqi	Li Zhichao	Xie Xingyin	Ye Jianjun	Beijing, China
Rod Feltham	Scott Davidge	Kris MacLeod	Keith Clarke		St. John's, Newfoundland and Labrador
Riley Fenson	Samuel Strouse	Connor Kauffman	Aidan Oldenburg	Jacob Zeman	(United States) Bemidji, Minnesota
Adam Fenton	Alex Duncan-Wu	Chris Parkinson	Matthew Fenton		New Westminster, British Columbia
Pat Ferris	Connor Lawes	Connor Duhaime	Robert Currie	Evan Lilly	Grimsby, Ontario
Ian Fitzner-Leblanc	Christopher McDonah	Mark Robar	Alex McDonah		Nova Scotia
Mike Flannery	Scott Archibald	Kevin Keefe	Steve Christie		Fredericton, New Brunswick
Colton Flasch	Catlin Schneider	Kevin Marsh	Dan Marsh		Saskatoon, Saskatchewan
Wayne Fleming	Jason Hallack	Kevin Maloney	Brian Onken		(United States) Phoenix, Arizona
Paul Flemming	Scott Saccary	Ryan Abraham	Phil Crowell		Halifax, Nova Scotia
Alex Forrest	Taylor McIntyre	Daniel Gagne	Derek Blanchard	Joey Witherspoon	Winnipeg, Manitoba
Hayden Forrester	Brennan Sampson	Cyrus Brandt	Alexandre Fontaine		Winnipeg, Manitoba
Mike Foster	Carson Walsh	Mike Walsh	Chris Lovell		Penetanguishene, Ontario
Mike Fournier	Kevin Flewwelling	Sean Harrison	Zander Elmes		Toronto, Ontario
Mark Franklin	Jamie Hay	Barry Campbell	Greg Ziemanski		Winnipeg, Manitoba
Luke Saretsky (Fourth)	John Fraser (Skip)	Arthur Cradock	Mitchell Wrishko	Jay Pierce	Saskatoon, Saskatchewan
Graham Freeman	Brooks Freeman	Kevin Barkley	Dwayne Barkley		Virden, Manitoba
Jace Freeman	Thomas McGillivray	Ryan Ostrowsky	Aaron Macdonell		Virden, Manitoba
Anthony Friesen	Bill Thiessen	Bradley McLeod	Keaton Bachalo		Pilot Mound, Manitoba
Rhett Friesz	Chadd McKenzie	Andre Fagnan	Byron Wickerson		Airdrie, Alberta
Shunichi Fujita	Kazuhito Okazaki	Kouki Kinoshita	Shun Sakai	Kou Tanaka	Hokkaido, Japan
Alastair Fyfe	Hussain Hagawi	Mohammed Aldaraan	Munir Albeelbisi	Suleiman Alaqel	Riyadh, Saudi Arabia
Ian Gagnon	Clive Webster	Bruce Freshwater	Ash Wood		Australia
Nolan Galardo	Cameron Fraser	Finn Meakins	Michael Duffy	Ben Potter	Peterborough, Ontario
Patrik Kapralik (Fourth)	Jakub Polak	Juraj Gallo (Skip)	Jakub Červenka	Jan Horáček	Bratislava, Slovakia
Ben Gamble	Mitch Heidt	Braydan Mohns	Blake Hoffman		Regina, Saskatchewan
Josep Garcia	César Mialdea	–	Valentín Ortiz		Andorra
Chris Gardner	Brad Kidd	Nicholas Cattizone	Greg Gardner		Ottawa, Ontario
Jacques Gauthier	Sterling Middleton	Jason Ginter	Alex Horvath		Victoria, British Columbia
Sean Geall	Brad Wood	Mitchell Kopytko	Darin Gerow		New Westminster, British Columbia
Christian Gebert	Fabian Sager	Zhang Tianyi	Ivo Colombo		Aarau, Switzerland
Brent Gedak	Derek Owens	Kyle Morrison	Curtis Horwath		Estevan, Saskatchewan
Mathias Genner	Jonas Backofen	Martin Reichel	Florian Mavec		Kitzbühel, Austria
Tony Germsheid	Dale Sperle	Jessi Wilkinson	Neal Woloschuk		Edmonton, Alberta
Jasmin Gibeau	Dan deWaard	Marc-Antoine Biron-Paquette	Kevin Ménard		Buckingham, Quebec
Andrew Gibson	Mike Flemming	Mike Bardsley	Kris Granchelli		Halifax, Nova Scotia
Jeff Ginter	Graham Powell	Steve Byrne	Dean Darwent		(Alberta) Dawson Creek, British Columbia
Léandre Girard	James Trahan	Robert Richard	Xavier Guevin		Quebec, Quebec
Pascal Girard	Mathieu Hamel	Mario Gagnon	Remi Savard		Chicoutimi, Quebec
Chris Glibota	Dan Mick	Eric Gelinas	Marc Barrette	Matt Mann	Sault Ste. Marie, Ontario
Francis Godin	Guillaume Rousseau	Jacob Thériault	Janick Thériault		Rivière-du-Loup, Quebec
Dale Goehring	Tim Krassman	Greg Hill	Roy Martin		Calgary, Alberta
Colton Goller	Michael Roy	Nicholas Rabl	Brady Gillies		Calgary, Alberta
Chris Gomes	Patrick Prade	Martin Perry	Brian Cole	Bobby Dubeau	Maple Ridge, British Columbia
Philip Gorveatt	Kevin Champion	Sean Ledgerwood	Mike Dillon		Montague, Prince Edward Island
Phil Goschnick	Jim Hansen	Alex Latyshev	Matt Heskett		Australia
Wouter Gösgens	Jaap van Dorp	Laurens Hoekman	Tobias van den Hurk	Alexander Magan	Zoetermeer, Netherlands
Connor Grabow	Miles Grabow	Jaime Christopher Vidaurrazaga	Elijah DeRomanis	Ethan Macomber	(United States) Blaine, Minnesota
Simon Granbom	Axel Sjöberg	Fabian Wingfors	Jacob Hanna	Olle Moberg	Gävle, Sweden
Sean Grassie	Jordon Johnson	Daryl Evans	Rodney Legault		Winnipeg, Manitoba
James Grattan	Scott McDonald	Paul Dobson	Andy McCann		Oromocto, New Brunswick
Mathieu Gravel	Sonny Melancon	Alexandre Michaud	Mathieu Cole		Val-d'Or, Quebec
Colin Griffith	Vernon Boyd	John Inkster	–		Grande Prairie, Alberta
Mason Guentzel	Stuart Stack	Will Podhradsky	Leighton Hines		(United States) Saint Paul, Minnesota
Ritvars Gulbis	Artis Zentelis	Aivars Avotiņš	Anrijs Mikuss Briezkalns		Riga, Latvia
Brad Gushue	Mark Nichols	E. J. Harnden	Geoff Walker		St. John's, Newfoundland and Labrador
Al Hackner	Frank Morissette	Rob Sinclair	Gary Champagne		Thunder Bay, Ontario
Johan Håkansson	Rickard Högström	Thomas Wallentinsson	Tomas Arnas	Patric Håkansson	Karlstad, Sweden
Matthew Hall	Curtis Easter	Nathan Gonsalves	–		St. Thomas, Ontario
David Hamblin	Kris Mazinke	Ron Vermette	Devin Vermette		Morris, Manitoba
Glen Hansen	Warren Cross	Douglas Marks	George Parsons		Edmonton, Alberta
Jacob Bekken (Fourth)	Rune Steen Hansen (Skip)	Vidar Hansen	Trond Erik Standerholen	Tor Egil Strømeng	Hedmarken, Norway
Trevor Hanson	Adam MacDonald	Scott Archibald	Matt Munro		Oromocto, New Brunswick
Hiroki Hara	Fujii Kaito	Miharu Kubota	Ryouga Sakurai		Chūbu, Japan
Tyler Harris	Tyler MacKenzie	Daniel MacFadyen	Nathan Hardy		Crapaud, Prince Edward Island
Andreas Hårstad	Michael Mellemseter	Willhelm Næss	Emil M. Kvål		Oppdal, Norway
Jeff Hartung	Gerry Adam	Jason Krupski	Claire DeCock		Langenburg, Saskatchewan
Kody Hartung	Tyler Hartung	Brady Scharback	Brady Kendel		Saskatoon, Saskatchewan
Francis Hawco	Michel Ladouceur	Peter Wright	Chris Pratt		Ottawa, Ontario
Richard Hawkins	Kerry Kingsland	Brian Rempel	Dave Brown		East St. Paul, Manitoba
Kevin Hawkshaw	Sawer Kaeser	Jim Lockhart	Jeff O'Keefe	Rob Rinas	Fort Smith, Northwest Territories
Caden Hebert	Jack Bestland	Benji Paral	Jack Wendtland		(United States) Eau Claire, Wisconsin
Simon Hebert	Frank Holliday	Denis Carter	Stephane Leger		Cornwall, Ontario
Pete Heck	Josh Kroker	Simon Maltby	Simon Labine		Truro, Nova Scotia
Cory Heggestad	Andrew Thompson	Kelly Schuh	James Freeman		Stroud, Ontario
Josh Heidt	Drew Heidt	Matt Lang	Tyler Gamble		Kerrobert, Saskatchewan
Brayden Heistad	Ethan Desilets	Chase Ulriksen	Brayden Sinclair		Saskatoon, Saskatchewan
Ben Helston	Michael Sharp	Christopher Collings	Jarrett Kress		Calgary, Alberta
Jordan Henry	Matt Mann	Jody Ritthaler	Patrick Schwartz		Prince Albert, Saskatchewan
Johan Herfjord	Eskild Eriksen	Sondre Elvevold	Hogne Lyngvold	Håkon Lien	Trondheim, Norway
Paweł Hertman	Paweł Frynia	Piotr Święszek	Marcin Senderski		Gliwice, Poland
Tim Hockin (Fourth)	Darren Higgins (Skip)	Mike Spencer	Jonathan Greenan		Summerside, Prince Edward Island
Jake Higgs	Sheldon Wettig	Brady St. Louis	Christian Smitheram	Terry Lichty	Iqaluit, Nunavut
Richard Hills	Ruaraidh Whyte	Matthew Bailey	Peter Walton	Mick Fletcher	Kent, England
Kohsuke Hirata	Shingo Usui	Ryota Meguro	Yoshiya Miura	Kosuke Aita	Kitami, Japan
Daniel Hocevar	Matthew Prenevost	Quinn Heffron	Nelson Wang		Toronto, Ontario
Andrew Hodgson	Jared Palanuik	Blake Johnson	Dale McMillan		Calgary, Alberta
Marco Hösli	Philipp Hösli	Marco Hefti	Justin Hausherr		Glarus, Switzerland
Erik Hoff	Kent Terje Stegavik	Tor Olav Haugen	Geir Morten Fjaeran	Sebastian Varmdal	Trondheim, Norway
Brandt Holt	Joel MacDonald	Lane Missel	Jordon Geiger		Sherwood Park, Alberta
Hiroyuki Honda	Ryu Yamamura	Ryuta Numabe	Koana Kazuyomi	Tomohiro Akita	Kitami, Japan
Anton Hood	Ben Smith	Brett Sargon	Hunter Walker	Peter de Boer	Naseby, New Zealand
Jake Horgan	Olivier Bonin-Ducharme	Derek Leung	Samuel Branconnier	Owen Allard	Sudbury, Ontario
Tanner Horgan	Darren Moulding	Jake Horgan	Colin Hodgson		Sudbury, Ontario
Darryl Horsman	Skyler Slusar	Matt Merkle	Tyler Caldwell		(United States) Phoenix, Arizona
Grunde Buraas (Fourth)	Lukas Høstmælingen (Skip)	Magnus Lillebø	Tinius Haslev Nordbye		Oslo, Norway
Andy Hovland	Steve Cerkvenik	Kevin Glad	–		(United States) Saint Paul, Minnesota
Glenn Howard	Scott Howard	David Mathers	Tim March		Penetanguishene, Ontario
Steven Howard	Kris Keating	Austin Williamson	Scott Deck		Regina, Saskatchewan
Karel Hradec	Michal Zdenka	Václav Pořt	Martin Štěpánek		Prague, Czech Republic
Dean Hürlimann	Matthieu Fague	Nicolas Romang	Jan Tanner		Zug, Switzerland
Rayad Husain	Jason Perreira	Baul Persaud	Khemraj Goberdhan		Georgetown, Guyana
Al Hutchinson	Kevin Daniel	Bruce Cox	Dave Hailburton		Owen Sound, Ontario
Ryan Hyde	Kenneth Keeler	Hartley Vanstone	Trevor Munro	George Brooks	Portage la Prairie, Manitoba
Takanori Ichimura	Daisuke Sonoyama	Seiji Yamamoto	Miki Yamamoto		Nagano, Japan
Kishiro Kyo	Takuo Saokawa	Shun Ichitsubo	Ryohei Maruyama	Kentaro Hashimoto	Kantō, Japan
Koto Inaba (Fourth)	Toshiya Iida (Skip)	Yuta Fuse	Kento Nishida		Wakkanai, Japan
Jonathan Imlah	Jordan Ensinger	Zach Boland	Emil Cooper		Australia
Steve Irwin	Travis Taylor	Travis Brooks	Travis Saban		Brandon, Manitoba
Jan Iseli	Max Winz	Andreas Gerlach	Sandro Fanchini		Solothurn, Switzerland
Masaki Ishikawa	Yutaro Kasai	Takanori Hirano	Tatsuya Yokota	Kenji Takamatsu	Sapporo, Japan
Takuma Shimoji	Akihito Sasajoma	Hirotaka Ishikuro	Takuma Harada		Karuizawa, Japan
Juon Ishimura	Sota Kon	Youn Ishimura	Shunaki Kudo		Aomori, Japan
Brad Jacobs	Jordan Chandler	Kyle Chandler	Jamie Broad		Sault Ste. Marie, Ontario
Jason Jacobson	Jason Ackerman	Jacob Hersikorn	Quinn Hersikorn		Saskatoon, Saskatchewan
Ryan Jacques	Desmond Young	Andrew Gittis	Gabriel Dyck		Edmonton, Alberta
Gian Fadri Jaecklin	Nicola Brand	Siro Schmid	Simon Rauchenstein	Gian Loritz	Baden, Switzerland
David Jákl	Marek Bříza	David Škácha	Aleš Hercok	David Verner	Prague, Czech Republic
Anders Jakobson	Siim Sein	Erkki Lill	Aleksander Andre		Tallinn, Estonia
Jesse Janz	Darrick Jones	Scott Crayston	Charles Tweed		Baldur, Manitoba
Blair Jay	Chuck Jay	Corey Montgomery	Glenn Rogers		Summerside, Prince Edward Island
Giorgi Jeiranashvili	Davit Minasiani	Kakha Ambrolava	Gocha Jeiranashvili		(Georgia (country)) Tbilisi, Georgia
Jared Jenkins	David Thompson	Ben Savage	Mike McIntyre		Airdrie, Alberta
Evan Jensen	Derek Corbett	Aaron Carlson	Andrew Dudt		(United States) Raleigh, North Carolina
Jeong Byeong-jin	Lee Jeong-jae	Kim Min-woo	Kim Tae-hwan	Lee Dong-hyeon	Seoul, South Korea
Jeong Yeong-seok	Park Jong-duk	Oh Seung-hoon	Seong Ji-hoon		Gangwon, South Korea
Manuel Jermann	Yannick Jermann	Simon Hanhart	Wowa Sakaliuk		Arlesheim, Switzerland
Dean Joanisse	Grant Dezura	Brendan Willis	Dave Stephenson		Maple Ridge, British Columbia
Rob Johnson	Lyle Kent	Steve Thomas	Nathan Relitz		Calgary, Alberta
Dylan Johnston	Brennan Wark	Chris Briand	Jordan Potter		Thunder Bay, Ontario
Denis Jolin	Ghislain East	Robert Gaudet	Pierre Pilon		Noranda, Quebec
Jacob Jones	Eric Just	Joel Matthews	Liam Little	Elias Whittington	Hamilton, Ontario
Jeremy Mallais (Fourth)	Scott Jones (Skip)	Brian King	Jared Bezanson		Moncton, New Brunswick
Shawn Joyce	Greg Harcourt	Richard Choquette	Jeff Slade		Saskatoon, Saskatchewan
Andy Jukich	Ryan Mellinger	Daniel Plys	John Muller		(United States) Duluth, Minnesota
Fredrik Julius	Micke Andersson	Martin Vallee	Johan Bergman	Johan Solberg	Sundbyberg, Sweden
Björn Jungen	Marc Pfister	Tim Jungen	Simon Gempeler		Zürich, Switzerland
Dustin Kalthoff	Braden Fleishhacker	Jayden Bindig	Nathan Pomedli		Saskatoon, Saskatchewan
Ken Kanai	Ryo Yoshihara	Tatsuya Sumino	Asano Tsutomu	Hideki Yoshii	Kanagawa, Japan
Junpei Kanda	Shinya Kiyofuji	Shotara Hashimoto	–		Tokyo, Japan
Kang Min-jun	Lee Ji-hoon	Lee Hee-song	Song Ye-song		Seoul, South Korea
Benny Kapp	Felix Messenzehl	Johannes Scheuerl	Mario Trevisiol		Füssen / Oberstdorf, Germany
Serkan Karagöz	Selahattin Eser	Mehmet Bayramoğlu	Bilal Nerse	Muhammed Zenit	Erzurum, Turkey
Uğurcan Karagöz	Muhammet Haydar Demirel	Muhammed Zeki Uçan	Orhun Yüce	Faruk Kavaz	Erzurum, Turkey
Arihito Kasahara	Kazuhisa Unoura	Yuuki Fukatsu	Shotaro Shimada	Norio Teramoto	Kantō, Japan
Nobuyuki Kato	Junichi Ishida	Keiji Tsunoda	Masaki Takimoto		Tōhoku, Japan
David Kaun	Marc Bourguignon	Evangeline Fortier	Minh Nguyen		Ottawa, Ontario
Aden Kavanaugh	Benjamin Currie	Christopher Churchill	Caelan McPherson		Halifax, Nova Scotia
Harunobu Kawahira	Yuuki Ookawa	Tomoya Shibasaki	Ryouta Watanabe	Satoshi Onodera	Obihiro, Japan
Kantaro Kawano	Kazaki Matsuoka	Shun Takahaski	Keita Nishizawa		Sapporo, Japan
Mark Kean	Cameron Goodkey	Wesley Forget	Ed Cyr		Ottawa, Ontario
Andrew Kempthorne	Galen McCallum	Ryan Martens	Nathan Jansens		Brandon, Manitoba
Mike Kennedy	Grant Odishaw	Marc LeCocq	Vance LeCocq	Robert Daley	Fredericton, New Brunswick
Kalle Kiiskinen	Teemu Salo	Jermu Pöllänen	Paavo Kuosmanen	Jouni Mikkonen	Hyvinkää, Finland
Kim Soo-hyuk (Fourth)	Kim Chang-min (Skip)	Seong Se-hyeon	Kim Hak-kyun	Jeon Jae-ik	Uiseong, South Korea
Kim Jeong-min	Kim San	Choi Chi-won	Park Se-won	Kwon Dong-keun	Gyeonggi-do, South Korea
Jamie King	Mike Jantzen	Sean Morris	Wade Johnston	Todd Brick	St. Albert, Alberta
Jayden King	Jack Ragan	Owen Henry	Jacob Clarke		Ottawa, Ontario
Jay Kinnaird	James Hay	Kris Kinnaird	Sean Mckean		Virden, Manitoba
Max Kirkpatrick	Scott Rumpel	Mitch Minken	Jeff Chambers		Swift Current, Saskatchewan
Kyler Kleibrink	Joshua Kiist	Chris Kennedy	Evan van Amsterdam		Calgary, Alberta
Rylan Kleiter	Joshua Mattern	Trevor Johnson	Matthieu Taillon		Saskatoon, Saskatchewan
Lukáš Klíma	Marek Černovský	Radek Boháč	Martin Jurík	Lukáš Klípa	Prague, Czech Republic
Kelly Knapp	Brennen Jones	Mike Armstrong	Trent Knapp		Regina, Saskatchewan
Ichiei Koana	Ryoichiro Kinoshita	Shunya Mizunai	Kaito Yamada	Ryu Yamamura	Hokkaido, Japan
Daisuke Kobayashi	Hiromasa Yonehara	Naoki Tazawa	Yohji Satoh		Karuizawa, Japan
Craig Kochan	Brent Pierce	Darryl Prebble	Jon Solberg	Chad Allen	(United States) Scottsdale, Arizona
Takahiro Kodama	Ryu Sasaki	Yuki Kanzaki	Hiroaki Sumi		Tōhoku, Japan
Jamie Koe	Glen Kennedy	Cole Parsons	Shadrach McLeod		Yellowknife, Northwest Territories
Kevin Koe	Tyler Tardi	Brad Thiessen	Karrick Martin		Calgary, Alberta
Chris Kolody	Garth Andruchow	Aiden Procter	Rick Salt		Leduc, Alberta
Kazuhiro Takada (Fourth)	Takayuki Kawano	Takeshi Yamauchi	Toshiaki Komiya (Skip)		Kantō, Japan
Kenji Komoda	Hideyuki Sato	Keigo Ishii	Takashi Koyanagi		Kantō, Japan
Parker Konschuh	Craig Bourgonje	Landon Bucholz	Bryce Bucholz		Edmonton, Alberta
Jonathan Kostna	Peter Albig	Josh Evans	Colin Desaulniers		St. Adolphe, Manitoba
Warren Kozak	Dwayne Romanchuk	J. R. Falzetta	Kris Gira		Calgary, Alberta
Cayden Kraft	Trey Gehrke	Caysen Hemstad	Sawyer Heger		(United States) Bismarck, North Dakota
Anders Kraupp	Michael Vilenius	Rolf Wikström	Peter Tedenback	Mats Jansson	Danderyd, Sweden
Mikkel Krause	Mads Nørgaard	Tobias Thune	Henrik Holtermann	Oliver Rosenkrands Søe	Hvidovre, Denmark
Takumi Tanabe (Fourth)	Daiki Maruyama	Shunto Tsuchiya	Hiromitsu Kuriyama (Skip)	Shungo Nomizo	Kantō, Japan
Sigurd Svorkmo-Lundberg (Fourth)	Tor-Erling Kvarner (Skip)	Sondre Svorkmo-Lundberg	Isak Herfjord		Oppdal, Norway
Patrick Kverkild	Bjørn Tore Elvevold	Svein Østgård	Kare Brandso		Trondheim, Norway
Stewart Kyle	Jack Halliday	Edward Hanna	Owen Kennedy		Dumfries, Scotland
J. P. Lachance	John Wilson	Ken Ellis	Mike Johansen		Ottawa, Ontario
Mario Lafrenière	Jocelyn Fillon	Serge Belanger	Claude Villeneuve		Val-d'Or, Quebec
Jason LaMontagne	Colin Palmer	Alex Sprague	Paul Martin		Ottawa, Ontario
Axel Landelius	Alfons Johansson	Alexander Palm	Johan Engqvist		Mjölby, Sweden
Bernard Larouche	Martin Blanchette	Pierre Parent	Jean Noël Luneau		Val-d'Or, Quebec
Frederic Lawton	Matthew Kennerknecht	David Miles	Charles Gagnon		Montreal, Quebec
Steve Laycock	Shaun Meachem	Chris Haichert	Brayden Stewart		Saskatoon, Saskatchewan
Bob Leclair	Fred Maxie	Jeff Baird	Tom Danielson		(United States) Scottsdale, Arizona
Alexandre Leduc	François Halle	Nick Dumaresq	Martin Trépanier	David-Lee Amos	Valleyfield, Quebec
Lee Jae-beom	Kim Eun-bin	Kim Hyo-jun	Pyo Jeong-min	Kim Jin-hoon	Daegu, South Korea
Lee Jun-hwa	Kim Dae-hyeon	Kwon Jun-seo	Kim Min-je	Park Seong-min	Uiseong, South Korea
Nicholas Lemieux	John McCutcheon	Charlie Randell	Dylan Sipura		Oakville, Ontario
Benjamin Levy	Shawn King	John Gaul	Jeff Peplinski		(United States) Detroit, Michigan
Jacob Libbus	Nathan Molberg	Steven Leong	Michael Henricks		Okotoks, Alberta
Lin Ting-li	Brendon Liu	Nelson Wang	Martin Shen		Taiwan, Chinese Taipei
Alexander Lindström	Kristian Lindström	Christoffer Svae	Ole Davanger	Lasse Vinje	Oslo, Norway
Rob Lister	Chris Sears	Troy Thibideau	Ada Marshall		Fredericton, New Brunswick
Rob Lobel	Steven Lobel	Steven Oldford	Wyllie Allan		Whitby, Ontario
Mark Longworth	Dean Mackney	Greg Hamilton	Shane Longworth	Michael Longworth	Vernon, British Columbia
Mark Lukowich	Sheldon Oshanyk	Chris Chimuk	Chad Barkman		Winnipeg, Manitoba
Ma Xiuyue	Cheng Kuo	Yuan Mingjie	Nan Jiawen		Beijing, China
Mats Mabergs	Joakim Mabergs	Mathias Mabergs	Andreas Rangedal	Lars Göthberg	Malung, Sweden
Craig MacAlpine	Jeremy Hodges	Brian Shackel	Chris Evernden		Edmonton, Alberta
Sandy MacEwan	Dustin Montpellier	Lee Toner	Luc Ouimet		Sudbury, Ontario
Calan MacIsaac	Nathan Gray	Owain Fisher	Christopher McCurdy		Truro, Nova Scotia
Glen MacLeod	Craig Burgess	Kevin Ouellette	Peter Nelly		Truro, Nova Scotia
Takumi Maeda	Uryu Kamikawa	Hiroki Maeda	Asei Nakahara		Kitami, Japan
Daniel Magnusson	Robin Ahlberg	Anton Regosa	Axel Yseus		Karlstad, Sweden
Takuma Makanae	Yuki Yamamoto	Takaaki Minami	Masaki Kudou	Nihira Taiki	Hokkaido, Japan
Denis Malette	Mike Pozihun	Rob Shubat	Kent Maarup		Thunder Bay, Ontario
Scott Manners	Ryan Deis	Kalin Deis	Carter Babij		Lloydminster, Saskatchewan
Elliott Mansell	Aaron Johnston	Simon Jarrett	Cameron Cabrera		(United States) Denver, Colorado
Matthew Manuel	Luke Saunders	Jeffrey Meagher	Nick Zachernuk		Halifax, Nova Scotia
Liam Marin	Spencer Watts	Felipe Marin	Matt Magee		Saint John, New Brunswick
Timothy Marin	Rajan Dalrymple	Emmett Knee	Cameron Sallaj		Saint John, New Brunswick
Emil Markusson	Fredrik Ljungberg	Mikael Ljungberg	Rickard Hallström		Östersund, Sweden
Bart Witherspoon (Fourth)	Kelly Marnoch (Skip)	Branden Jorgensen	Dean Smith		Carberry, Manitoba
Ethan Marshall	Mike Marshall	Kieran Baron	Ryder Chetrybuk	Colten Gawryluik	Brandon, Manitoba
Yannick Martel	Jean-François Charest	Jean-Pierre Larouche	Martin Asselin		Saguenay, Quebec
Tomonori Matsuzawa	Takumi Ozawa	Syunsuke Hamayose	Shun Aizawa	Tatsuya Kaneko	Hokkaido, Japan
Lukas Matt	Harald Sprenger	Johannes Zimmermann	Peter Prasch	Mauro Liesch	Liechtenstein
Justin McBride	Erik Jensen	Cameron Ross	Joel Calhoun		(United States) Anaheim, California
Kyle McCannell	Curtis McCannell	Rhilynd Peters	Jeff MacMillan	Jace Guilford	Pilot Mound, Manitoba
Matthew McCrady	Thomas Love	Breyden Carpenter	Daniel Dabiri		New Westminster, British Columbia
John McCutcheon	Mike McCutcheon	Mike Walsh	Dylan Sipura		Toronto, Ontario
Jordon McDonald	Reece Hamm	Elias Huminicki	Cameron Olafson		Winnipeg, Manitoba
Adam McEachren	Ethan Young	David McCurdy	Caelan McPherson		Halifax, Nova Scotia
Mike McEwen	Ryan Fry	Jonathan Beuk	Brent Laing		Toronto, Ontario
Jordan McNamara	Wil Robertson	Ryan Godfrey	Brendan Laframboise		Ottawa, Ontario
Ryan McNeil Lamswood	Daniel Bruce	Nathan King	Aaron Feltham		St. John's, Newfoundland and Labrador
Ryan Meadows	Jon Ranger	Cameron Longe	Taylor Schottroff	Kevin Brown	Kenora, Ontario
Chris Medford	Steve Tersmette	Mitch Young	Blair Jarvis		Kimberley, British Columbia
Michael Mellemseter	Kristian Rolvsjord	Eirik Mjøen	Truls Rolvsjord	Sondre Snøve Høiberg	Oppdal, Norway
Marcelo Mello	Ricardo Losso	Alain d'Ambroise	Filipe Nunes		São Paulo, Brazil
Dean Hewitt (Fourth)	Jay Merchant (Skip)	Tanner Davis	Justin Grundy		Melbourne, Australia
Quentin Morard (Fourth)	Eddy Mercier (Skip)	Yannick Valvassori	Killian Gaudin	Leo Tuaz-Torchon	Megève, France
Dave Merklinger	Darren Heath	Jamie Austin	Al Shepard		Vernon, British Columbia
Stéphane Michaud	Sylvain Proulx	–	Rejean Marcouiller		Trois-Rivières, Quebec
Ben Mikkelsen	Greg Doran	Mark Blanchard	Devin Doran		Thunder Bay, Ontario
Jaedon Miller	James Owens	Jared Day	Riley Lloyd		Saskatoon, Saskatchewan
Hugh Millikin	Matt Panoussi	Sean Hall	Derek Smith		Sydney, Australia
Markus Dale (Fourth)	Anders Mjøen (Skip)	Emil Sæther	Erland Loe	Jonathan Got	Oppdal, Norway
Paul Moffatt	Ben Shane	D. J. Ronaldson	Kyle Forster		Waterloo, Ontario
Abdulrahman Mohsen	Salem Ali	Mouaaz Mlis	Mohammed Al-Keldi		Doha, Qatar
Jason Montgomery	Chris Baier	Miles Craig	William Duggan		Victoria, British Columbia
Sam Mooibroek	Scott Mitchell	Nathan Steele	Colin Schnurr		Whitby, Ontario
Alain Moreau	Xavier Roy	Eric Villeneuve	Alain Bédard		Val-d'Or, Quebec
Dennis Moretto	Paul Attard	Brian Alexander	Scott Clarke		Woodbridge, Ontario
Yusuke Morozumi	Yuta Matsumura	Ryotaro Shukuya	Kosuke Morozumi	Masaki Iwai	Karuizawa, Japan
Jonathan Morrison	Donald Lapointe	Alain Perras	Trevor Findlay		Russell, Ontario
David Morton	–	Ryan McGuire	Samuel Rousseau		Ottawa, Ontario
Nick Mosher	Sean Beland	Evan Hennigar	Aidan MacDonald	Owen McPherson	Halifax, Nova Scotia
Bruce Mouat	Grant Hardie	Bobby Lammie	Hammy McMillan Jr.		Stirling, Scotland
Glen Muirhead	Thomas Muirhead	Callum Kinnear	Scott Andrews		Perth, Scotland
Steven Munroe	Yannick Martel	Philippe Brassard	Jean-François Charest		Saguenay, Quebec
Richard Muntain	Dean Dunstone	Alan Purdy	Bruce Wyche		Winnipeg, Manitoba
Dallan Muyres	Garret Springer	Jordan Tardi	Dustin Mikush		Saskatoon, Saskatchewan
Junto Nagatani	Akitomo Tamura	Hiromasa Higashimoto	Hirotomo Takahashi	Isao Murakami	Tōhoku, Japan
Tsubasa Nakagawa	Ouji Maeda	Ryota Hanada	Eishiro Yoshida	Kagetora Kawahira	Hokkaido, Japan
Tao Nakahara	Hinata Michitani	Riku Takemura	Yuuta Kimura		Hokkaido, Japan
Yoshito Nakamura	Makanae Shinichi	Takehiro Suzuki	Naoki Asaki	Takeshi Endo	Aomori, Japan
Masayuki Namioka	Makoto Sato	Kiyonao Sasaki	Yuya Yamada		Tōhoku, Japan
Randy Neufeld	Dean Moxham	Peter Nicholls	Dale Fust	Dean Clayton	La Salle, Manitoba
Jamie Newson	Dennis Watts	Corey Miller	Andrew MacDougall	Terry Arsenault	Summerside, Prince Edward Island
Dylan Niepage	Kibo Mulima	Gavin Lydiate	Riley Fung-Ernst		Waterloo, Ontario
Eduard Nikolov	Yaroslav Shchur	Artem Suhak	Vladyslav Koval	Artem Hasynets	Kyiv, Ukraine
Rob Nobert	Adam Cseke	Logan Miron	Cam Weir		Vernon, British Columbia
Kotaro Noguchi	Yuto Kamada	Hiroshi Kato	Yuuki Yoshimura	Hayato Fujimura	Sendai, Japan
Thomas Nordgren	Jonas Olsson	Johan Ceder	Niclas Svenman	Anders Haglund	Falun, Sweden
Ryan Norman	Carl McRee	Steve Gladue	Wayne Dastou		Slave Lake, Alberta
Dean North	Wayne Nussey	Mike Hutton	Darren Peckover	Darcy Hayward	Carman, Manitoba
Mats Nyberg	Björn Rosendahl	Per Södergren	Hans Söderström	Thomas Andersson	Danderyd, Sweden
Johan Nygren	Daniel Berggren	Johan Jaervenson	Victor Martinsson	Sebastian Lundgren	Umeå, Sweden
Fredrik Nyman	Patric Mabergs	Simon Olofsson	Johannes Patz		Sollefteå, Sweden
Frank O'Driscoll	Murray Nicholson	Dave Taite	Gene Kwan		St. John's, Newfoundland and Labrador
Sean O'Leary	Andrew Trickett	Dylan Hancock	Jake Young	Jack Furlong	St. John's, Newfoundland and Labrador
Nicolas Oake	Sean Borkovic	Anthony Ogg	Tyler Brodt	Matt Hannah	Edmonton, Alberta
Giovanni Gottardi	Nicola Gottardi	Alessandro Odorizzi	Gabriele Holler		Trento, Italy
Eirik Øy	Johan Herfjord	Sondre Elvevold	Martin Bruseth		Oppdal, Norway
Ryo Ogihara	Satoru Tsukamoto	Wataru Henmi	Nobuhito Kasahara	Haruki Watanabe	Tokyo, Japan
Katsuyuki Ohara	Yoshinari Suzuki	Seiji Asano	Yusuke Shimizu		Karuizawa, Japan
Fukuhiro Ohno	Terry Uyeda	Eito Nakagawa	Asami Ootake	Takahiro Hashimoto	Hokkaido, Japan
Weston Oryniak	Eric Fenech	Matt Duizer	Mattias Cheung	Eoghan Drumm	Toronto, Ontario
Camil Palin	Simon Jeanson	Alexis Vezeau	Pierre-Luc Jeanson		Val-d'Or, Quebec
Benoit Gagné (Fourth)	Pierre Lajoie	Samuel Roberge	Mathieu Paquet (Skip)		Saguenay, Quebec
Ryan Parent	Zachary Pawliuk	Tyler Powell	John Ritchie		Calgary, Alberta
Raphaël Patry	Anthony Pedneault	Zachary Pedneault	Jacob Labrecque	Léandre Girard	Saguenay, Quebec
Mark Patterson	Ryan Laidlaw	Aiden Poole	Owen Tester		Sarnia, Ontario
Tomáš Paul	Karel Klíma	Jan Sedlár	Jakub Skála		Prague, Czech Republic
Steve Pauls	Clare Reimer	Bernie Hildebrand	Russell Pauls	Matthew Pauls	Pilot Mound, Manitoba
Ben Pearce	Sean McCloskey	Connor Lund	Evan Mott		Alliston, Ontario
Ken Peddigrew	David Noftall	Andrew Manuel	Craig Dowden		St. John's, Newfoundland and Labrador
Braden Pelech	Matthew Wasylenko	Joshua Buchholtz	James McCabe		Edmonton, Alberta
Darren Perche	Jason Perche	Shane Perche	Bryce Perche	Clint Stuart	Charleswood, Manitoba
Niclas Perem	Dan-Ola Eriksson	Torbjörn Harnesk	Bo Andersson	Dag Michaelsen	Gothenburg, Sweden
Simon Perry	Nicholas Codner	William Butler	Evan Scott		St. John's, Newfoundland and Labrador
Jordan Peters	Andrew Clapham	Zack Bilawka	Cole Chandler		Winnipeg, Manitoba
Jean-Christophe Pichon	Richard Kochan	Gerald Breton	Felicia St-Pierre		Val-d'Or, Quebec
Brent Pierce	Jeff Richard	Jared Kolomaya	Nicholas Meister		New Westminster, British Columbia
Victor Pietrangelo	Daniel Krowchuk	Patrick Sipura	Ben Harbridge		St. Catharines, Ontario
Mykhailo Pleskanka	Hennadii Stasiuk	Oleksandr Hats	Yasyl Yatseviuk		Kyiv, Ukraine
Nathan Pomedli	Braden Fleishhacker	Jayden Bindig	Ethan Nygaard		Wadena, Saskatchewan
Aiden Poole	Ryan Laidlaw	Owen Tester	Nicholas Robinson		Sarnia, Ontario
James Pougher	Rhys Phillips	Gary Coombs	Simon Pougher	Martin Lloyd	Hawarden, Wales
Greg Power	Tony Moore	Ryan MacIver	Jamie Turnbull		Halifax, Nova Scotia
Gert Precenth	Olle Nabo	Rolf Svensson	Per Persson		Mjölby, Sweden
Owen Purcell	Joel Krats	Adam McEachren	Scott Weagle		Halifax, Nova Scotia
Owen Purdy	Colin Schnurr	Grant Schnurr	Connor Massey	Kaamraan Islam	Kingston, Ontario
Liam Quinlan	Caleb Tibbs	Luke Wilson	Jack Furlong		St. John's, Newfoundland and Labrador
Howard Rajala	Rich Moffatt	Chris Fulton	Paul Madden		Ottawa, Ontario
P. N. Raju	Giri Suthakaran	Vinay Goenka	Kishan Vasant		Hyderabad, India
Magnus Ramsfjell	Martin Sesaker	Bendik Ramsfjell	Gaute Nepstad		Trondheim, Norway
Sam Rankin	Eric Cox	Ryan Hazlitt-Black	Tim Weeks	Jacob Lackenby	Australia
Thomas Reed	Neil Imada	Preston Ballard	Miles Reed		Maple Ridge, British Columbia
Owen Rees	Jamie White	Stephen Lea	Ben Everly		Kent, England
Ansis Regža	Jānis Rudzītis	Aivars Purmalis	Ainārs Gulbis		Riga, Latvia
Fraser Reid	Shane Konings	Spencer Nuttall	Matt Pretty		Waterloo, Ontario
Rob Retchless	Jotham Sugden	Jonathan Havercroft	Harry Pinnell		Preston, England
Joël Retornaz	Amos Mosaner	Sebastiano Arman	Mattia Giovanella		Trentino, Italy
Justin Reynolds	Nick Weshnoweski	Josh Maisey	Sean Giesbrecht	Dan LeBlanc	Winnipeg Beach, Manitoba
Fabio Ribotta	Alberto Pimpini	Fabrizio Gallo	Francesco Vigliani	Stefano Gilli	Pinerolo, Italy
Justin Richter	Kyle Einarson	Jared Litke	Mitch Einarson		Beausejour, Manitoba
Patrick Prade (Fourth)	Trevor Ritchie (Skip)	Kevin Jeffers	Zachary Umbach		Vancouver, British Columbia
Jason Roach	Darren Roach	Spencer Mawhinney	Josh Vaughan		Fredericton, New Brunswick
François Roberge	Maxime Elmaleh	Éric Sylvain	Jean Gagnon		Lévis, Quebec
Vincent Roberge	Jean-Michel Arsenault	Jesse Mullen	Julien Tremblay		Lévis, Quebec
Alex Robichaud	Rene Comeau	Chris Wagner	Alex Kyle		Fredericton, New Brunswick
Ken Robichaud	Charles Courtland	Jason Smith	Dave Lajeunesse		Carleton Place, Ontario
Luke Robichaud	James Carr	Austen Matheson	Aiden Matheson		Fredericton, New Brunswick
Sébastien Robillard	Daniel Wenzek	Richard Krell	Nathan Small		Port Coquitlam, British Columbia
Adam Rocheleau	Maxime Mailloux	Joel Charbonneau	Jonathan Martel		Val-d'Or, Quebec
Landan Rooney	Connor Deane	Jacob Jones	Austin Snyder	Christopher Inglis	Whitby, Ontario
Landan Rooney	Daniel Hocevar	Joel Matthews	Christopher Oka		Mississauga, Ontario
Axel Rosander	Niclas Johansson	Vincent Stenberg	Albin Eriksson	Kristofer Blom	Norrköping, Sweden
Caiden Rose	Avery Wilson	Brock Sando	Tate Reeder-Holman		(United States) Denver, Colorado
Ron Rosengren	Gary Maunula	Dale Wiersema	Dave Sholtz		Thunder Bay, Ontario
Brendan Ross	Reagan Hadden	Dusty Cherpin	Chad Cyrenne	Daniel Mutlow	Swift Current, Saskatchewan
Nicholas Rowe	Jonathan Biemans	Tyler Biemans	Liam Rowe		Ottawa, Ontario
Pontus Persson (Fourth)	Johan Sundberg	Michael Roxin (Skip)	Stefan Englund	Niclas Silfverduk	Linköping, Sweden
Justin Runciman	Ethan Chung	Marcus Sawiak	Carter Elder		Edmonton, Alberta
Mike Farbelow (Fourth)	Rich Ruohonen (Skip)	Tim Solin	–		(United States) Saint Paul, Minnesota
JT Ryan	Colin Kurz	Austin Pearson	Brandon Radford		Winnipeg, Manitoba
Konstantin Rykov	Paulius Rymeikis	Vytis Kulakauskas	Donatas Kiudys	Matas Junevičius	Vilnius, Lithuania
Manabu Saito	Takao Harada	Ryouta Iwasaki	–		Kantō, Japan
Ethan Sampson	Kevin Tuma	Coleman Thurston	Marius Kleinas	Jacob Zeman	(United States) Chaska, Minnesota
Johnny Sandaker	Karsten Sandaker	Frank Humlekjær	Jan Aabel		Kristiansand, Norway
Yasuhiro Sano	Kazushi Shiraishi	Yoshiyuki Sai	Hideyuki Miyata		Tōhoku, Japan
Go Aoki (Fourth)	Hayato Sato (Skip)	Kouki Ogiwara	Kazushi Nino	Ayato Sasaki	Sapporo, Japan
Shigeaki Sato	Akihiko Yamazak	Takayuki Yamaguchi	–		Kantō, Japan
Christian Savard	Marc Tremblay	Marc-Andre Guenard	Marc Bergeron		Sageunay, Quebec
Andrin Schnider	Nicola Stoll	Noé Traub	Tom Winklehausen		Schaffhausen, Switzerland
Felix Schulze	Christopher Bartsch	Sven Goldemann	Peter Rickmers		Hamburg, Germany
Chase MacMillan (Fourth)	Mitchell Schut (Skip)	Cruz Pineau	Liam Kelly		Cornwall, Prince Edward Island
Martin Rios	Christof Schwaller	Kevin Spychiger	Peju Hartmann	Heinrich Huegli	Glarus, Switzerland
Dean Hürlimann (Fourth)	Kim Schwaller (Skip)	Matthieu Fague	Jan Tanner	Nicolas Romang	Zug, Switzerland
Benoît Schwarz (Fourth)	Yannick Schwaller (Skip)	Sven Michel	Pablo Lachat		Geneva, Switzerland
Thomas Scoffin	Trygg Jensen	Joe Wallingham	Evan Latos		Whitehorse, Yukon
Tom Scott	Tony Wilson	Ben Wilson	John Scott		(United States) Hibbing, Minnesota
Theophile Seguin	Matthew Violot	Sean McKenzie	Jack Bauer		Thompson, Manitoba
Steve Seixeiro	Chris Ribau	José Ribau	Vitor Santos	Ramiro Santos	Lisbon, Portugal
Štefan Sever	Marko Harb	Simon Langus	Žiga Babič	Martin Razinger	Ljubljana, Slovenia
Darryl Shane	Darryl MacKenzie	Don Shane	Steve Foster		Kitchener, Ontario
Randie Shen	Nicholas Hsu	Ken Hsu	Henry Cheng		(Chinese Taipei) Taipei, Taiwan
Grant Shewfelt	Michael Johnson	Rob Van Deynze	Mike Orchard	Travis Johnson	Baldur, Manitoba
Ryuji Shibaya	Fukuhiro Ohno	Masayuki Fujii	Syuji Nagasaki	Yasumo Nakamura	Hokkaido, Japan
John Shuster	Chris Plys	Matt Hamilton	John Landsteiner	Colin Hufman	(United States) Duluth, Minnesota
Mike Siggins	Erik Jensen	Sean Franey	Joel Calhoun		(United States) Tempe, Arizona
Steen Sigurdson	Josh Claeys	Scott Bruce	Emerson Klimpke		Winnipeg, Manitoba
David Šik	Jakub Hanák	Jakub Rychlý	Kryštof Tabery		Prague, Czech Republic
Connor Simms	Evan Bowman	Charles Darling	Avery Berry		Sault Ste. Marie, Ontario
Cory Schuh (Fourth)	Trent Skanes (Skip)	Spencer Wicks	Mike Mosher		St. John's, Newfoundland and Labrador
Greg Skauge	Tom Naugler	Brad Patzer	Robert Borden		Yellowknife, Northwest Territories
Alberto Skendrović	Bojan Gabrić	Davor Džepina	Sasa Vidmar	Hrvoje Tolić	Dugo Selo, Croatia
Markus Skogvold	Rune Steen Hansen	Trond Erik Standerholden	Dan Cato Roe		Hedmarken, Norway
Aaron Sluchinski	Jeremy Harty	Kerr Drummond	Dylan Webster		Calgary, Alberta
Doug Small	Harley Jones	Dale Bawol	Murray Sears		Peace River, Alberta
Jack Smeltzer	Michael Donovan	Trevor Crouse	Mitchell Small		Fredericton, New Brunswick
Mark Noseworthy (Fourth)	Alex Smith (Skip)	Mark Healy	Steve Bragg		St. John's, Newfoundland and Labrador
Calvin Smith	Alan Inman	Adam Arsenault	Tyson Smith		Crapaud, Prince Edward Island
Greg Smith	Adam Boland	Chris Ford	Zach Young		St. John's, Newfoundland and Labrador
Jason Smith	Dominik Märki	Jared Allen	Hunter Clawson		(United States) Nashville, Tennessee
Riley Smith	Nick Curtis	Jared Hancox	Justin Twiss		Winnipeg, Manitoba
Tyler Smith	Adam Cocks	Alex MacFadyen	Edward White		Crapaud, Prince Edward Island
Darryl Sobering	Nick Myers	D. J. Johnson	Josh Chetwynd	Alec Celecki	(United States) Denver, Colorado
Nicklas Soderberg	Arvid Stenberg	Jesper Johansson	Gustav Eskilsson	Oskar Sjöström	Östersund, Sweden
Nicolai Sommervold	Eirik Øy	Ådne Birketveit	Elias Høstmælingen		Lillehammer, Norway
Floris Ros (Fourth)	Hessel Janssens	Simon Spits (Skip)	Bart Klomp		Zoetermeer, Netherlands
Milan Spotti	Gian Wildhaber	Boas Fankhauser	Jonas Dietker		Aarau, Switzerland
Serge St-Germain	Philippe Simard	Claude St-Germain	Glen Holmstead		Val-d'Or, Quebec
Jesse St. John	Jared St. John	Carl deConinck Smith	Tyler Ritchie		Swift Current, Saskatchewan
Sam Steep	Thomas Ryan	Oliver Campbell	Adam Vincent		Seaforth, Ontario
Emerson Steffler	Bilal Islam	Kaamraan Islan	Timothy Clark	Cameron Mark	Unionville, Ontario
Tracy Steinke	Stefan Pavlis	Brett Winfield	Bruce Frederickson		Dawson Creek, British Columbia
Bill Adams (Fourth)	Jim Adams	Jeff Henderson	John Stetski (Skip)		Ottawa, Ontario
Jamie Stewart	Dylan MacDonald	Sean Beland	James Larlee	Loris Elliot	Fredericton, New Brunswick
Jeff Stewart	Eric Zamrykut	Austin Mustard	Geoff Trimble		Gladstone, Manitoba
Jan Hess (Fourth)	Yves Stocker (Skip)	Simon Gloor	Felix Eberhard		Zug, Switzerland
Steve Strathdee	Ian Trip	Don Davis	Chris Ware		Penticton, British Columbia
Kyle Stratton	Liam Tardif	Matthew Pouget	Owen Nicholls	Dylan Stockton	London, Ontario
Jack Strawhorn	Hamish Gallacher	Kaleb Johnston	Rory Macnair		Dumfries, Scotland
Karsten Sturmay	Kyle Doering	Kurtis Goller	Glenn Venance	J. D. Lind	Edmonton, Alberta
Konrad Stych	Krzysztof Domin	Marcin Ciemiński	Bartosz Łobaza		Łódź, Poland
Tsuyoshi Sukekawa	Atsuho Takahashi	Masahiro Tamura	Masahiro Takada		Morioka, Japan
Tom Sullivan	Brent MacDougall	Kirk MacDiarmid	Martin Gavin		Halifax, Nova Scotia
Cody Sutherland	James Hom	Cole Macknak	Landon Field		North Battleford, Saskatchewan
Dennis Sutton	Neil Dangerfield	Bob Coulombe	Derek Chandler		Victoria, British Columbia
Fraser Swanston	Jake MacDonald	Ewan Jackson	Jonathan Blair		Forfar, Scotland
Andrew Symonds	Colin Thomas	Chris Ford	Keith Jewer		St. John's, Newfoundland and Labrador
Josh Szajewski	Chris Lock	Wade Shasky	Matt Schottroff	Michael Szajewski	Keewatin, Ontario
Toshiaki Takahashi	Wataru Takahashi	Noriaki Abe	Minoru Kitagawa		Tōhoku, Japan
Naomasa Takeda (Fourth)	Kenji Takamatsu (Skip)	Yutaro Kasai	Keisuke Akutagawa		Hokkaido, Japan
Naomasa Takeda	Hiroshi Nisato	Fukuhiro Ohno	Kagetora Kawahira		Hokkaido, Japan
Yuya Takigahira	Kazuki Yoshikawa	Tatsuya Ogawa	Itsuki Sasaki	Kanya Shimizuno	Hokkaido, Japan
Wayne Tallon	Steve Soles	Dave McCafferty	Steve Kelly		Fredericton, New Brunswick
Cody Tanaka	Josh Miki	Nicholas Umbach	Connor Kent		New Westminster, British Columbia
Yusuke Tanaka	Ryohei Takahashi	Yusuke Kondo	Koki Yamaguchi	Kotaro Tasaka	Kantō, Japan
Ryutaro Tani	Kohei Okamura	Takuya Ishikawa	Daiki Yamazaki	Shunta Mizukami	Kantō, Japan
Johnson Tao	Jaedon Neuert	Benjamin Morin	Adam Naugler		Edmonton, Alberta
Shawn Taylor	Sheldon Wettig	Geordie Hargreaves	Dale Guils		Brandon, Manitoba
Dave Thomas	Travis Cormier	Floyd Francis	Murray Hupman		Port aux Basques, Newfoundland and Labrador
Stuart Thompson	Kendal Thompson	Colten Steele	Michael Brophy		Halifax, Nova Scotia
Arran Thomson	Lewis McCabe	Jamie Gorton	Sam McConnachie	William Gorton	Perth, Scotland
Ryan Thomson	Marcus Titchkosky	Thomas Titchkosky	Evan Gillis		Winnipeg, Manitoba
Brandon Tippin	Dylan Tippin	Jackson Cox	Jess Bechard		Bala, Ontario
Parker Tipple	Spencer Tipple	Jack Kinsella	Isaac Manuel		St. John's, Newfoundland and Labrador
Greg Todoruk	Peter Prokopowich	Darcy Todoruk	Terron Stykalo		Dauphin, Manitoba
Takahito Tomiyasu (Fourth)	Shinichi Tokuyama (Skip)	Hitoshi Ishihara	Masao Yogo		Chūbu, Japan
Jian Toru	Kikuchi Atsushi	Tabei Atsushi	Okitsu Tadashige		Kantō, Japan
Sixten Totzek	Klaudius Harsch	Magnus Sutor	Dominik Greindl		Munich, Germany
Gjermund Troan	Tim Nicholai Aspeli	Marius Aspeli	Tobias Bekken		Hedmarken, Norway
Mārtiņš Trukšāns	Jānis Klīve	Arnis Veidemanis	Sandris Buholcs		Riga, Latvia
Margus Tubalkain	Valvo Vooremaa	Tilt Kaart	Tonis Turmann		Tallinn, Estonia
Kevin Tym	Mike Hutchings	Brian McPherson	Travis Cooper	Derek Skarban	Edmonton, Alberta
Kazuya Uehara	Takashi Kawahara	Mamoru Sakashita	Tomoya Saga		Karuizawa, Japan
Rob Van Kommer	Jefferey Steen	Seth White	Lucas Pedersen		Brandon, Manitoba
Steve vanOuwerkerk	Sam Ramsay	Nick vanOuwerkerk	Patrick Ramsay		Summerside, Prince Edward Island
Aaron Van Ryssel	Riel Dufault	Jonah Peterson	Andrew McKay		Winnipeg, Manitoba
Daylan Vavrek	Roland Robinson	Tyler Lautner	Evan Asmussen		Edmonton, Alberta
Jaroslav Vedral	Martin Blahovec	Oliver Kobian	Daniel Peter		Prague, Czech Republic
Darrel Veiner	Ken Powell	Mark Heartt	Darrel Gunderson		Dawson Creek, British Columbia
Mihhail Vlassov (Fourth)	Eduard Veltsman (Skip)	Janis Kiziridi	Igor Dzendzeljuk	Konstantin Dotsenko	Tallinn, Estonia
Jeroen Spruyt (Fourth)	Timo Verreycken (Skip)	Daan Yskout	Bram van Looy		Zemst, Belgium
Sergio Vez	Mikel Unanue	Eduardo De Paz	Nicholas Shaw		San Sebastián, Spain
Jaime Christopher Vidaurrazaga	Connor Grabow	Ethan Macomber	Miles Grabow	Elijah DeRomanis	(United States) Cambridge, Massachusetts
Jonathan Vilandt	Jacob Schmidt	Alexander Qvist	Kasper Boge Jurlander		Hvidovre, Denmark
Shane Vollman	Kevin Fetsch	Garry Janz	Bob Sonder		Regina, Saskatchewan
Kyle Waddell	Craig Waddell	Mark Taylor	Gavin Barr		Glasgow, Scotland
Aaron Wagstaff	Glenn Wight	Steve Lang	Shel Cohen		Baie-D'Urfé, Quebec
Terry Walker	Steve Gilbert	Kirk Massey	Jay Larocque		St. Thomas, Ontario
Steffen Walstad	Magnus Nedregotten	Mathias Brænden	Magnus Vågberg		Oppdal, Norway
Brett Walter	Graham McFarlane	Devon Wiebe	Hugh McFarlane		Winnipeg, Manitoba
Zachary Wasylik	Jack Hykaway	Joshua Harding	Graham Normand		Winnipeg, Manitoba
Daiki Shikano (Fourth)	Kato Onodera	Tomoya Watanabe (Skip)	Takanobu Yamaura		Kantō, Japan
Scott Webb	Tristan Steinke	Jordan Steinke	Andrew Dunbar		Sexsmith, Alberta
Austin Weber	Mike Johnson	James Bald	Dan Overby		(United States) Sioux Falls, South Dakota
Gary Weiss	Deron Surkan	Aaron Rogalski	Mark Beazley		Thunder Bay, Ontario
Wesley Wendling	John Wilkerson	Chris Kirsch	Jackson Armstrong		(United States) Wausau, Wisconsin
Anders Westerberg	Peter Larsson	Lars Ahlberg	Mikael Guslin		Sundbyberg, Sweden
Carl-Oscar Pihl (Fourth)	Joel Westerberg (Skip)	Måns Winge	Kim Svedelid		Sundbyberg, Sweden
Tom Wharry	Brad Fitzherbert	Kevin Bleau	Charles Gagnon		Baie-D'Urfé, Quebec
Ross Whyte	Robin Brydone	Duncan McFadzean	Euan Kyle		Stirling, Scotland
Clayton Wicks	Wayne Oakman	Darwin Seidler	Greg Moffat		Swift Current, Saskatchewan
Ryan Wiebe	Ty Dilello	Sean Flatt	Adam Flatt		Winnipeg, Manitoba
John Willsey	Brady Lumley	Matthew Garner	Spencer Dunlop		Oakville, Ontario
John Wilson	Kyle Paradis	James Russell	Craig Whyte	Eoin McCrossan	Ireland
Kenan Wipf	Chase Lozinsky	Michael Keenan	Max Cinnamon	Kyle Fukami	Cochrane, Alberta
Zackary Wise	Michael Solomon	Stewart Yaxley	Tyler Lachance	Adam Cartwright	Montreal, Quebec
Joey Witherspoon	Taylor McIntyre	Derek Blanchard	Trevor Calvert		Winnipeg, Manitoba
Dustin Woloschuk	Lyndon Graff	Tyler Krupski	Spencer Ellis	Jordan Gottinger	Regina, Saskatchewan
Mike Wood	Troy Ziegler	Glen Allen	Ryan Landa		Victoria, British Columbia
Billy Woods	Don Chasse	Bill Carr	Nick Chasse		Lanark Highlands, Ontario
Harold Woods	Tijani Cole	Fabian Contreras	Robert Brianne		Lagos, Nigeria
Andrew Woolston	Andrew Reed	Scott Gibson	James Whittle	Martin Gregory	Kent, England
Mats Wranå	Mikael Hasselborg	Gerry Wåhlin	Mathias Hasselborg		Sundbyberg, Sweden
Takuro Yamada	Yuto Minegishi	Shun Yamamoto	Toru Kihara		Chūbu, Japan
Riku Yanagisawa	Tsuyoshi Yamaguchi	Takeru Yamamoto	Satoshi Koizumi		Karuizawa, Japan
Yang Woo-jin	Jeong Hyun-wook	Kim Min-sang	Kim Hong-geon	Kim Ye-chan	Uijeongbu, South Korea
Masanaga Yonetani	Masayuki Hosoda	Shiraishi Koichi	Takanori Fujiwara		Kantō, Japan
Hiroki Yoshioka	Hiromitsu Fujinaka	Yusuke Nonomura	Makoto Kouhashi	Atsushi Kamigaito	Okayama, Japan
Nathan Young	Sam Follett	Nathan Locke	Ben Stringer		St. John's, Newfoundland and Labrador
Kristaps Zass	Eduards Seļiverstovs	Krišjānis Java	Deniss Smirnovs		Riga, Latvia
Gaber Bor Zelinka	Simon Langus	Tomas Tišler	Jakob Omerzel	Noel Gregori	Ljubljana, Slovenia
Adil Zhumagozha	Aidos Alliyar	Dmitriy Garagul	Abragim Tastemir	Arman Irjanov	Almaty, Kazakhstan
Brandon Zuravloff	Brett Behm	Rob Zuravloff	Jonathan Nagy		Canora, Saskatchewan

== Women ==
As of April 7, 2023

Skip	Third	Second	Lead	Alternate	Locale
Skylar Ackerman	Kya Kennedy	Taylor Stremick	Kaylin Skinner		Saskatoon, Saskatchewan
Ava Acres	Aila Thompson	Liana Flanagan	Mya Sharpe		Ottawa, Ontario
Emma Acres	Kate Phillips	Emily Parkinson	Makayla McMullin	Ava Acres	Ottawa, Ontario
Miia Ahrenberg	Minna Karvinen	Tiina Suuripää	Tuuli Rissanen	Bonnie Nilhamn-Kuosmanen	Hyvinkää, Finland
Jennifer Allan	Sarah Picton	Corrie Wimmer	Carol O'Brien		Innisfil, Ontario
Sarah Anderson	Taylor Anderson	Lexi Lanigan	Leah Yavarow		(United States) Chaska, Minnesota
Sherry Anderson	Patty Hersikorn	Brenda Goertzen	Anita Silvernagle		Saskatoon, Saskatchewan
LeAnne Andrews	Jenn Routliffe	Tracy Strecker	Cathy Chapman		Kamloops, British Columbia
Hailey Armstrong	Megan Smith	Jessica Humphries	Terri Weeks		Waterloo, Ontario
Cathy Auld	Chrissy Cadorin	Cayla Auld	Courtney Auld		Thornhill, Ontario
Courtney Auld	Cayla Auld	Emilie Lovitt	Jessica Filipcic	Claire Anderson	Toronto, Ontario
Tyanna Bain	Carina McKay-Saturnino	Tyra Bain	Tannis Bain		Inuvik, Northwest Territories
Julia Bakos	Mikaela Cheslock	Erin Tester	Lauren Massey	Amelia Dolsen	London, Ontario
Trina Ball	Candace Reed	Deborah Hawkshaw	Sarah Mazoleski		Edmonton, Alberta
Bang Yu-jin	Oh Ji-hyeon	Kim Hae-jeong	Kim Chae-rin	Park Ye-rin	Uiseong, South Korea
Brett Barber	Krystal Englot	Kristin Ochitwa	Mackenzie Schwartz	Alyssa Kostyk	Biggar, Saskatchewan
Penny Barker	Christie Gamble	Jenna Enge	Danielle Sicinski		Moose Jaw, Saskatchewan
Evelīna Barone	Rēzija Ieviņa	Veronika Apse	Ērika Patrīcija Bitmete	Letīcija Ieviņa	Riga, Latvia
Emma Barr	Nicola Joinder	Rachael Dakers	Shannon Whatley		Stirling, Scotland
Jodi Bass	Jenny Jahn	Hannah Green	Holly Burke		Dumfries, Scotland
Kaye Bassett	Lacy Simko	Liz Odell Howe	Sarah Smith		(United States) Fairbanks, Alaska
Madison Bear	Annmarie Dubberstein	Elizabeth Cousins	Allison Howell		(United States) Chaska, Minnesota
Emily Ogg (Fourth)	Grace Beaudry (Skip)	Maddy Hollins	Mackenzie Arbuckle		Winnipeg, Manitoba
Hailey Beaudry	Erin Tomalty	Victoria Beaudry	Hilary Smith		Fort Frances, Ontario
Shae Bevan	Kyla Grabowski	Paige Beaudry	Jessica Hancox	Lauren Beaudry	Winnipeg, Manitoba
Lisa Birchard	Kelsey Meger	Breanne Yozenko	Ciara Okumura	Jenessa Rutter	Winnipeg, Manitoba
Hailey Birnie	Chelsea Jarvis	Kerry Campbell	Kimberley Tuor	Jenna Duncan	Whitehorse, Yukon
Suzanne Birt (Fourth)	Marie Christianson (Skip)	Michelle Shea	Meaghan Hughes		Charlottetown, Prince Edward Island
Christina Black	Jenn Baxter	Karlee Everist	Shelley Barker		Halifax, Nova Scotia
Kathrine Blackham	Jana Hoffmann	Johanna Blackham	Selina Studer	Anika Meier	Basel, Switzerland
Sophie Blades	Kate Weissent	Stephanie Atherton	Alexis Cluney		Chester, Nova Scotia
Lucy Blair	Alexandra MacKintosh	Holly Hamilton	Susie Smith		Stirling, Scotland
Amélie Blais	Cathlia Ward	Paige Engel	Alison Ingram		Saskatoon, Saskatchewan
Santa Blumberga-Bērziņa	Ieva Rudzīte	Katrīna Gaidule	Tīna Siliņa		Riga, Latvia
Claire Booth	Kaylee Raniseth	Raelyn Helston	Lauren Miller		Calgary, Alberta
Beata Bowes	Anne Powell	Katherine Hayes	Stephanie Barr		Australia
Emily Bowles	Meredith Cole	Mahra Harris	Sasha Wilson		Victoria, British Columbia
Shelly Bradley	Susan McInnis	Julie Scales	Tricia MacGregor		Charlottetown, Prince Edward Island
Chelsea Brandwood	Brenda Holloway	Riley Sandham	Hilary Nuhn	Jordan Brandwood	Listowel, Ontario
Theresa Breen	Mary Sue Radford	Julie McMullin	Helen Radford	Heather Smith	Halifax, Nova Scotia
Paige Brewer	Kirsten Donovan	Rice Carruthers	Amelia Mercer		Saint John, New Brunswick
Jennifer Briscoe	Shana Marchessault	Corie Adamson	Carly Perras		Thunder Bay, Ontario
Corryn Brown	Erin Pincott	Dezaray Hawes	Samantha Fisher		Kamloops, British Columbia
Dacey Brown	Morgan Zinck	Kassidy Turcotte	–		Edmonton, Alberta
Kaila Buchy	Katelyn McGillivray	Jaelyn Cotter	Hannah Lindner		Kelowna, British Columbia
Abby Burgess	Brooke Tracy	Tyler Parmiter	Taryn Abernethy	Katherine Stirling	Oromocto, New Brunswick
Krysta Burns	Katie Ford	Sara Guy	Laura Masters		Sudbury, Ontario
Marin Callaghan	Maria Fitzgerald	Grace McCusker	Peyton Bowser		Halifax, Nova Scotia
Alyssa Calvert	Stacey Irwin	Pam Robins	Roz Taylor		Carberry, Manitoba
Adriana Camarena	Estefana Quintero	Veronica Huerta	Karla Martínez	Paulina Olivares	Mexico City, Mexico
Jenna Campbell	Olivia Wynter	Izzy Paterson	Rebecca Watson		Fredericton, New Brunswick
Chelsea Carey	Jolene Campbell	Liz Fyfe	Rachel Erickson	Jamie Sinclair	Winnipeg, Manitoba
Emily Clark	Emily Deibert	Rachel Clark	Leslie Hammond		Westlock, Alberta
Sandy Comeau	Shelley Thomas	Carol Justason	Allison Chisholm		Moncton, New Brunswick
Stefania Constantini	Marta Lo Deserto	Angela Romei	Giulia Zardini Lacedelli		Cortina d'Ampezzo, Italy
Shiella Cowan	Sandra Comadina	Stephanie Whittaker-Kask	Christine Matthews		New Westminster, British Columbia
Jaclyn Crandall	Kendra Lister	Molli Ward	Kayla Russell	Melissa Adams	Fredericton, New Brunswick
Bella Croisier	Piper Croisier	Dominique Vivier	Celeste Gauthier		Sudbury, Ontario
Samantha Crook	Amy Butts	Katy Fox	Sarah Duah		Oromocto, New Brunswick
Elysa Crough	Quinn Prodaniuk	Kim Bonneau	Julianna Mackenzie		Edmonton, Alberta
Jennifer Crouse	Julie McEvoy	Sheena Moore	Kaitlin Fralic		Halifax, Nova Scotia
Stacie Curtis	Erica Curtis	Julie Hynes	Camille Burt		St. John's, Newfoundland and Labrador
Jessica Daigle	Kirsten Lind	Lindsey Burgess	Emma Logan	Colleen Jones	Halifax, Nova Scotia
Abby Deschene	Keira McLaughlin	Melanie Ebach	Shannon Clifford		Acton, Ontario
Emily Deschenes	Emma Artichuk	Grace Lloyd	Adrienne Belliveau		Ottawa, Ontario
Ashley Dezura	Brook Aleksic	Savannah Miley	Hannah Smeed		New Westminster, British Columbia
Laurie Donaher	Michelle Majeau	Anne Beaumont	Paula Graves	Amanda Skiffington	Moncton, New Brunswick
Moa Dryburgh	Thea Orefjord	Moa Tjärnlund	Moa Nilsson		Sundbyberg, Sweden
Hollie Duncan	Megan Balsdon	Rachelle Strybosch	Tess Guyatt		Woodstock, Ontario
Karen Dundore	Nicole Brinkman	Anna Johnson	Jessica Margan		(United States) Rice Lake, Wisconsin
Madeleine Dupont	Mathilde Halse	Denise Dupont	My Larsen		Hvidovre, Denmark
Yekaterina Kolykhalova (Fourth)	Angelina Ebauyer (Skip)	Tilsimay Alliyarova	Regina Ebauyer	Merey Tastemir	Almaty, Kazakhstan
Kerri Einarson	Val Sweeting	Shannon Birchard	Briane Harris		Gimli, Manitoba
Isabell Einspieler	Alissa Rudolf	Lynn Haupt	Renée Frigo		St. Gallen / Wetzikon, Switzerland
Krista Ellingson	Ellen Redlick	Brett Day	Leigh Dick		Regina, Saskatchewan
Chelsey Emberley	Chantel Martin	Sheri Martin	Teejay Haichert		Saskatoon, Saskatchewan
Beth Farmer	Hailey Duff	Kirstin Bousie	Katie McMillan	Amy MacDonald	Stirling, Scotland
Lisa Farnell	Kitty Conlin	Vikki Brannigan	Jessica Skelton	Kathryn Spain	Kent, England
Melodie Forsythe	Carly Smith	Deanna MacDonald	Caylee Smith		Moncton, New Brunswick
Anna Fowler	Hetty Garnier	Angharad Ward	Naomi Robinson		Kent, England
Susan Froud	Kaitlin Jewer	Kristina Brauch	Audrey Wallbank		Alliston, Ontario
Satsuki Fujisawa	Chinami Yoshida	Yumi Suzuki	Yurika Yoshida		Kitami, Japan
Sarah Gaines	Leah Cluff	Carly Smith	Ashley Coughlan	Sierra Tracy	Oromocto, New Brunswick
Jo-Ann Rizzo (Fourth)	Sarah Koltun	Margot Flemming	Kerry Galusha (Skip)		Yellowknife, Northwest Territories
Jaimee Gardner	Rhiannon Beckstad	Jaclyn Peters	Alexis Riordan		Ottawa, Ontario
Amanda Gebhardt	Dianne Dykstra	Erin Cook	Allison Singh		Guelph, Ontario
Tahli Gill	Kirby Gill	Oh Sun-yun	Lucy Militano	Ivy Militano	Australia
Gim Eun-ji	Kim Min-ji	Kim Su-ji	Seol Ye-eun	Seol Ye-ji	Uijeongbu, South Korea
Shelly Graham	Sharon Levesque	Robyn Witherell	Shelley Murray		Fredericton, New Brunswick
Clancy Grandy	Kayla MacMillan	Lindsay Dubue	Sarah Loken		Vancouver, British Columbia
Serena Gray-Withers	Catherine Clifford	Brianna Cullen	Zoe Cinnamon		Edmonton, Alberta
Brea Grueneich	Sarah Linneman	Jennifer Anglin	Morgan Weber		(United States) Sioux Falls, South Dakota
Brette Richards (Fourth)	Blaine de Jager	Alyssa Kyllo	Diane Gushulak (Skip)	Grace MacInnes	Vernon, British Columbia
Ha Seung-youn	Kim Hye-rin	Yang Tae-i	Kim Su-jin		Chuncheon, South Korea
Holly Hafeli	Jorja Kopytko	Hannah O'Neil	Natalie Hafeli	Eryn Czirfusz	Kamloops, British Columbia
Bella Hagenbuch	Rilee Kraft	Mae Hagenbuch	Lauren Hein		(United States) Utica, Illinois
Bernadett Biró (Fourth)	Csilla Halász (Skip)	Blanka Biró	Tímea Schrotter-Nagy	Zsanett Gunzinám	Budapest, Hungary
Callan Hamon	Kourtney Fesser	Krista Fesser	Haylee Jameson		Regina, Saskatchewan
Han Yu	Dong Ziqi	Zhu Zihui	Jiang Jiayi	Ren Haining	Beijing, China
Jacqueline Harrison	Allison Flaxey	Lynn Kreviazuk	Laura Hickey		Dundas, Ontario
Meredith Harrison	Courtney Smith	Gilda Chisholm	Shauna Colter	Heather Kennedy	Halifax, Nova Scotia
Michelle Hartwell	Jessica Monk	Erica Wiese	Ashley Kalk		Edmonton, Alberta
Anna Hasselborg	Sara McManus	Agnes Knochenhauer	Sofia Mabergs		Sundbyberg, Sweden
Heather Heggestad	Ginger Van Ymeren	Michelle Butler	Lauren Harrison		Stroud, Ontario
Johanna Heldin	Sofie Bergman	Emma Landelius	Mikaela Altebro		Stockholm, Sweden
Fay Henderson	Holly Wilkie-Milne	Robyn Munro	Laura Watt		Dumfries, Scotland
Krysta Hilker	Kim Curtin	Sydney Steinke	Claire Murray		Edmonton, Alberta
Sarah Hill	Kelli Sharpe	Beth Hamilton	Adrienne Mercer		St. John's, Newfoundland and Labrador
Tanya Hilliard	Taylor Clarke	Mackenzie Feindel	Heather MacPhee	Liz Garnett	Dartmouth, Nova Scotia
Amber Holland	Kim Schneider	Karlee Korchinski	Debbie Lozinski		Kronau, Saskatchewan
Natalie Hollands	Megan Stopera	Jersey Hollands	Lillian Molitor		(United States) Bowling Green, Ohio
Rachel Homan (Fourth)	Tracy Fleury (Skip)	Emma Miskew	Sarah Wilkes		Ottawa, Ontario
Lauren Horton	Hannah Gargul	Brittany O'Rourke	Pamela Nugent		Montreal, Quebec
Ashley Howard	Cary-Anne McTaggart	Sara England	Shelby Brandt		Regina, Saskatchewan
Carly Howard	Stephanie Matheson	Grace Holyoke	Jestyn Murphy		Mississauga, Ontario
Corrie Hürlimann	Melina Bezzola	Nadine Bärtschiger	Anna Gut	Celine Schwizgebel	Zug, Switzerland
Kaye Hufman	Lacy Simko	Liz Odell Howe	Sarah Smith		(United States) Fairbanks, Alaska
Ling-Yue Hung	Ada Shang	Pianpian Hu	Yuen-Ting Wong		Hong Kong
Jessie Hunkin	Kristen Streifel	Becca Hebert	Dayna Demers		Spruce Grove, Alberta
Atsuko Ichinaka	Kaho Kato	Haruka Tanaka	Akira Kamihira	Moe Nomoto	Kitami, Japan
Leah Ieraci	Carolyn Swan	Delaney Hyde	Tanja Aitken	Stefania Bertazzoni	Australia
Danielle Inglis	Kira Brunton	Cheryl Kreviazuk	Cassandra de Groot		Whitby, Ontario
Stephanie Jackson-Baier	Kayla Wilson	Elizabeth Bowles	Carley Sandwith-Craig		Victoria, British Columbia
Michèle Jäggi	Irene Schori	Stefanie Berset	Sarah Müller	Lara Stocker	Bern, Switzerland
Dominique Jean	Lauren Cheal	Valerie Tanguay	Laura Girard-Côté		Dollard-des-Ormeaux, Quebec
Emma Jensen	Lane Prokopowich	Rebecca Friesen	Julia Millan		Winnipeg, Manitoba
Shawna Jensen	Layna Pohlod	Sarah Wong	Amanda Wong		Greater Vancouver, British Columbia
Daniela Jentsch	Emira Abbes	Mia Höhne	Analena Jentsch	Pia-Lisa Schöll / Lena Kapp	Füssen, Germany
Allory Johnson	Gianna Johnson	Bailey Vaydich	Lily Olson		(United States) Blaine, Minnesota
Christina Johnson	Amanda Duff	Randine Baker	Roxie Trembath		Winnipeg, Manitoba
Atina Johnston	Shannon Morris	Cori Morris	Sheri Pickering		Okotoks, Alberta
Jennifer Jones	Karlee Burgess	Mackenzie Zacharias	Emily Zacharias	Lauren Lenentine	Winnipeg, Manitoba
Jodi Judd	Shana Marchessault	Corie Adamson	Carly Perras		Thunder Bay, Ontario
Gabriela Kajanová	Silvia Sýkorová	Linda Haferová	Nina Mayerová	Daniela Matulová	Bratislava, Slovakia
Marie Kaldvee	Liisa Turmann	Kerli Laidsalu	Erika Tuvike		Tallinn, Estonia
Asuka Kanai	Ami Enami	Junko Nishimuro	Mone Ryokawa		Karuizawa, Japan
Kang Bo-bae	Choi Ye-jin	Park Han-byul	Jo Ju-hee	Kim Na-yeon	Uijeongbu, South Korea
Nicky Kaufman	Jennifer Van Wieren	Megan Anderson	Holly Baird	Pam Appelman	Edmonton, Alberta
Selina Witschonke (Fourth)	Elena Mathis	Raphaela Keiser (Skip)	Marina Lörtscher		St. Moritz, Switzerland
Andrea Kelly	Sylvie Quillian	Jill Brothers	Katie Forward		Fredericton, New Brunswick
Elizabeth Kessel	Tesa Silversides	Mya Silversides	Hannah Rugg	Claudia Lacell	Moose Jaw, Saskatchewan
Cara Kesslering	Kaydence Lalonde	Aryn Thibault	Kaylee Rosenfelt		Yorkton, Saskatchewan
Mackenzie Kiemele	Jillian Uniacke	Cassie Barnard	Emma McKenzie		Toronto, Ontario
Kim Eun-jung	Kim Kyeong-ae	Kim Cho-hi	Kim Seon-yeong	Kim Yeong-mi	Gangneung, South Korea
Kim Min-seo	Park Seo-jin	Shim Yu-jeong	Song Da-bin	Jeong Anah	Cheongju, South Korea
Ikue Kitazawa	Seina Nakajima	Minori Suzuki	Hasumi Ishigooka	Chiaki Matsumura	Nagano, Japan
Madison Kleiter	Chantel Hoag	Rianna Kish	Hanna Johnson		Saskatoon, Saskatchewan
Arisa Kotani	Eri Ogihara	Kotoka Segawa	Ai Kawada		Miyota, Japan
Marcella Tammes (Fourth)	Triin Kukk (Skip)	Kaisa Aatonen	Kadri Erit		Tallinn, Estonia
Isabelle Ladouceur	Jamie Smith	Grace Lloyd	Rachel Steele		Waterloo, Ontario
Tracey Larocque	Samantha Morris	Corie Adamson	Rebecca Carr		Thunder Bay, Ontario
Kaitlyn Lawes	Selena Njegovan	Jocelyn Peterman	Kristin MacCuish		Winnipeg, Manitoba
Ashley Lennie	Natasha Nasogaluak	Alison Lennie	Kate Jarvis	Melba Mitchell	Inuvik, Northwest Territories
Heidi Lin	Amanda Chou	Stephanie Lee	I-Ling Liu	Shar-Yin Huang	Chinese Taipei
Emily Lindsay	Sarah Dufault	Jessica Thorne	Chloe Bourguignon		Orleans, Ontario
Aneta Lipińska	Ewa Nogły	Marta Leszczyńska	Magdalena Kołodziej		Łódź, Poland
Cailey Locke	Katie Peddigrew	Sitaye Penney	Kate Young		St. John's, Newfoundland and Labrador
Darlene London	Robyn MacDonald	Shelly Rice	Gail Greene		Montague, Prince Edward Island
Katy Lukowich	Lauren Rajala	Mikaylah Lyburn	Makenna Hadway		Winnipeg, Manitoba
Kristen MacDiarmid	Kelly Backman	Liz Woodworth	Julia Colter		Halifax, Nova Scotia
Rachel MacLean	Sydney Howatt	Lexie Murray	Beth Stokes		Cornwall, Prince Edward Island
Brigitte MacPhail	Sadie Pinksen	Kaitlin MacDonald	Alison Taylor		Iqaluit, Nunavut
Meaghan Mallett	Daniela Aucoin	Jessica Byers	Emma Rebel		Toronto, Ontario
Lauren Mann	Shelley Hardy	Stephanie LeDrew	Marteen Jones		Ottawa, Ontario
Nancy Martin	Lindsay Bertsch	Jennifer Armstrong	Krysten Karwacki		Saskatoon, Saskatchewan
Krista McCarville	Kendra Lilly	Ashley Sippala	Sarah Potts		Thunder Bay, Ontario
Jackie McCormick	Crystal Taylor	Jen Gates	Amanda Gates		Stratton, Ontario
Kristy McDonald	Lisa Blixhavn	Leslie Wilson-Westcott	Raunora Westcott		Winnipeg, Manitoba
Jane McGinn	Joan Thompson	Cheryl Thibioud	Jenn Sears		Fredericton, New Brunswick
Christine McMakin	Cora Farrell	Jenna Burchesky	Clare Moores		(United States) Fargo, North Dakota
Kaylee McNamee	Kelsie Cygan	Rebecca Fradette	Sarah Guina		Calgary, Alberta
Eirin Mesloe	Torild Bjørnstad	Nora Østgård	Ingeborg Forbregd		Lillehammer, Norway
Mayu Minami	Kana Ogawa	Momo Kaneta	Nao Kyoto		Sapporo, Japan
Shellan Miskiman	Abi Reed	Amy Settee	Arizona LaClare		Tisdale, Saskatchewan
Amy Mitchell	Robyn Mitchell	Hannah Farries	Kristy Gallacher		Greenacres, Scotland
Jessica Mitchell	Jenna Hope	Meaghan Frerichs	Teresa Waterfield		Saskatoon, Saskatchewan
Yuina Miura	Ai Matsunaga	Yui Ueno	Eri Ogihara	Yuna Sakuma	Nayoro, Japan
Emma Moberg	Sofie Bergman	Emma Landelius	Mikaela Altebro		Stockholm, Sweden
Kristie Moore	Susan O'Connor	Janais DeJong	Valerie Ekelund		Sexsmith, Alberta
Rebecca Morrison	Gina Aitken	Sophie Sinclair	Sophie Jackson		Stirling, Scotland
Erin Morrissey	Erica Hopson	Alicia Krolak	Kim Brown		Ottawa, Ontario
Melissa Morrow	Darcy Birch	Lindsay Spencer	Miranda Ellis		Summerside, Prince Edward Island
Sarah Murphy	Erin Carmody	Kate Callaghan	Jenn Mitchell	Taylour Stevens	Halifax, Nova Scotia
Donna Mychaluk	Victoria Murphy	Shirley Wong	Janet Suter		Langley, British Columbia
Megumi Kanai (Fourth)	Maki Yamada	Akane Suzuki	Yuri Nakajima (Skip)		Miyota, Japan
Misaki Tanaka (Fourth)	Miori Nakamura (Skip)	Haruka Kihira	Hiyori Ichinohe	Yuuna Harada	Aomori, Japan
Isabelle Néron	Ginette Simard	Edith Cottenoir	Veronique Bouchard	Karine Tremblay	Chicoutimi, Quebec
Lynn Anne Brousseau (Fourth)	Cara Eastman	Erinn Chappell	Gaylene Nicholson (Skip)		Montague, Prince Edward Island
Jocelyn Nix	Jill Alcoe-Holland	Andrea Saulnier	Kim Garby		Halifax, Nova Scotia
Purity Njuguna	Rose Obilo	Mercy Ngovi	Laventer Oguto	Tinisga Wanjiru	Nairobi, Kenya
Lisa Muhmenthaler (Fourth)	Ariane Oberson (Skip)	Noa Kusano	Jana Hahlen	Nina Rufer	Bern, Switzerland
Isis Oliveira	Luciana Barrella	Marcélia Melo	Sarah Lippi	Giullia Rodriguez	São Paulo, Brazil
Sherilee Orsted	Candace Newkirk	Shalon Fleming	Jasmine Kerr		Regina, Saskatchewan
Toni Paisley	Kelsey Ostrowski	Nicole Brinkmann Reeves	Laura Yee		(United States) Onalaska, Wisconsin
Lisa Parent	Sophie Brissette	Kaitlin Zeller	Megan Johnson		Calgary, Alberta
Shaelyn Park	Nicole Arsenault Bishop	Krista Flanagan	Lynn LeBlanc		Moncton, New Brunswick
Park You-been	Kim Ji-yoon	Lee Eun-chae	Yang Seung-hee	Ahn Jin-hee	Seoul, South Korea
Virginija Paulauskaitė	Olga Dvojeglazova	Dovilė Aukštuolytė	Rūta Blažienė	Justina Zalieckienė	Vilnius, Lithuania
Margit Peebo	Cathy Vivien Vahl	Ingrid Novikova	Evelyn Karro		Tallinn, Estonia
Carmen Pérez	María Gómez	Daniela García	Leire Carasa	Ana Vázquez	San Sebastián, Spain
Roxane Perron	Kelly Tremblay	Miriam Perron	Sonia Delisle		Montreal, Quebec
Beth Peterson	Jenna Loder	Katherine Doerksen	Melissa Gordon		Winnipeg, Manitoba
Tabitha Peterson	Cory Thiesse	Becca Hamilton	Tara Peterson		(United States) Chaska, Minnesota
Jenna Pomedli	Melissa Remeshylo	Kelsey Noyes	Kylie Willms		Saskatoon, Saskatchewan
Kenna Ponzio	Christine Whear	Teagan Thurston	Carly Setter		(United States) Chaska, Minnesota
Marlee Powers	Mary Myketyn-Driscoll	Jocelyn Adams	Amanda Simpson		Halifax, Nova Scotia
Lauren Price	Marlise Carter	Summer Merrithew	Morgan Finley		Fredericton, New Brunswick
Adele Purcell	Deanne Nichol	Meghan Chateauvert	Heather Steele		St. Albert, Alberta
Polina Putintseva	Yaroslava Kalinichenko	Anastasiia Kotova	Oleksandra Kononenko	Diana Moskalenko	Kyiv, Ukraine
Maia Ramsfjell	Mili Smith	Pia Trulsen	Leeanne McKenzie		Lillehammer, Norway
Taylor Reese-Hansen	Megan McGillivray	Cierra Fisher	Sydney Brilz	Dailene Pewarchuk	Victoria, British Columbia
Hannah Augustin (Fourth)	Marijke Reitsma (Skip)	Sara Haidinger	Johanna Hoess	Verena Pfluegler	Kitzbühel, Austria
Alyssa Resch	Madison Ross	Talia Bertrand-Meadows	Amelia Kreis		Moose Jaw, Saskatchewan
Kim Rhyme	Libby Brundage	Cait Flannery	Katie Rhyme		(United States) Saint Paul, Minnesota
Cindy Ricci	Tamara Kapell	Natalie Bloomfield	Kristy Johnson		Regina, Saskatchewan
Gracelyn Richards	Rachel Jacques	Amy Wheatcroft	Anna Munroe		Edmonton, Alberta
Jo-Ann Rizzo	Janet Murphy	Lori Eddy	–		Mississauga, Ontario
Darcy Robertson	Gaetanne Gauthier	Rachel Kaatz	Kadriana Lott		Winnipeg, Manitoba
Elaine Robson	Sandi Gray	Haley Spenser	Sheri Logan		Saskatchewan
Kelsey Rocque	Danielle Schmiemann	Dana Ferguson	Rachelle Brown		Edmonton, Alberta
Kristin Skaslien (Fourth)	Marianne Rørvik (Skip)	Mille Haslev Nordbye	Martine Rønning		Lillehammer, Norway
Ava Roessler	Natasha Swatzina	Savannah Koch	Mika Haessly		(United States) Galesville, Wisconsin
Judy Ross	Connie Nichol	Beverly Janes Colpitts	–		Fredericton, New Brunswick
Breanna Rozon	Calissa Daly	Michaela Robert	Alice Holyoke		Mississauga, Ontario
Kristen Ryan	Megan Daniels	Kirsten Fox	Dawn Mesana		Maple Ridge, British Columbia
Sophia Ryhorchuk	Morgan Zacher	Allie Giroux	Brooke Giroux		(United States) Saint Paul, Minnesota
Deb Santos	Lorna Alfrey	Lil Grabinsky	Pauline Erickson	Sandy Tougas	Edmonton, Alberta
Honoka Sasaki	Mari Motohashi	Miki Hayashi	Ayuna Aoki	Mayumi Saito	Kitami, Japan
Miranda Scheel	Jordan Hein	Tessa Thurlow	Amelia Hintz	Anna Tamboli	(United States) Eau Claire, Wisconsin
Casey Scheidegger	Kate Hogan	Jessie Haughian	Taylor McDonald		Lethbridge, Alberta
Raechel Schechter	Samantha Carnie	Brylee Jeffries	Demareece Mackenzie		Swift Current, Saskatchewan
Lorraine Schneider	Larisa Murray	Ashley Williamson	Amanda Kuzyk		Regina, Saskatchewan
Xenia Schwaller	Fabienne Rieder	Marion Wüest	Selina Gafner	Selina Rychiger	Zürich, Switzerland
Mandy Selzer	Erin Barnhart	Megan Selzer	Sarah Slywka	Deanna Doig	Regina, Saskatchewan
Stephanie Senneker	Maya Willertz	Abigail Page	Anna Cenzalli	Nicole Prohaska	(United States) Kalamazoo, Michigan
Marla Sherrer	Chantele Broderson	Julie Selvais	Sarah Drummond		Lacombe, Alberta
Shin Ga-yeong	Lee Ji-yeong	Song Yu-jin	Shin Eun-jin		Jeonbuk, South Korea
Momono Shirahata	Youka Ishida	Sara Fujita	Maika Sawamukai	Honoka Ohara	Tokoro, Japan
Robyn Silvernagle	Kelly Schafer	Sherry Just	Kara Thevenot		North Battleford, Saskatchewan
Kayla Skrlik	Brittany Tran	Geri-Lynn Ramsay	Ashton Skrlik		Calgary, Alberta
Jessica Smith	Holly Thompson	Natalie Thurlow	Bridget Becker	Ruby Kinney	Naseby, New Zealand
Veronica Smith	Julia Hunter	Emily Best	Sabrina Smith		Charlottetown, Prince Edward Island
Laurie St-Georges	Emily Riley	Alanna Routledge	Kelly Middaugh		Laval, Quebec
Taylour Stevens	Lauren Ferguson	Alison Umlah	Cate Fitzgerald		Chester, Nova Scotia
Brooklyn Stevenson	Candace Chisholm	Michelle Englot	Nicole Bender		Regina, Saskatchewan
Kellie Stiksma	Nicole Larson	Jamie Scott	Bailey Horte		Edmonton, Alberta
Heather Strong	Jessica Wiseman	Brooke Godsland	Katie Follett	Laura Strong	St. John's, Newfoundland and Labrador
Delaney Strouse	Anne O'Hara	Sydney Mullaney	Rebecca Rodgers	Susan Dudt	(United States) Minneapolis, Minnesota
Selena Sturmay	Abby Marks	Kate Goodhelpsen	Paige Papley		Edmonton, Alberta
Tova Sundberg	Alva Sundberg	Emma Sjödin	Nilla Hallström		Karlstad, Sweden
Sierra Sutherland	Krysten Elson	Chelsea Ferrier	Julie Breton		Ottawa, Ontario
Kim Sutor	Lena Kapp	Elisa Scheuerl	Anne Kapp		Füssen, Germany
Rin Suzuki	Natsuki Saito	Juuna Nagaya	Miyu Matsuyama	Sora Aizawa	Aomori, Japan
Yumi Suzuki	Kyoka Kuramitsu	Aki Goto	Miho Fujimori	Tori Koana	Tokyo, Japan
Momoha Tabata	Miku Nihira	Mikoto Nakajima	Ayami Ito		Sapporo, Japan
Anna Tamboli	Ava Schapman	Clare Schapman	Heidi Holt		(United States) Duluth, Minnesota
Savanna Taylor	Annika Steckler	Ava Beausoleil	Leah Beausoleil	Nicole Beausoleil	Saskatoon, Saskatchewan
Stephanie Thompson	Cassidy Regush	Sarah Hoag	Kelly Kay		Regina, Saskatchewan
Lindsay Thorne	Jenny Madden	Emily Kelly	Rebecca Perry		Ottawa, Ontario
Alina Pätz (Fourth)	Silvana Tirinzoni (Skip)	Carole Howald	Briar Schwaller-Hürlimann		Aarau, Switzerland
Jana Tisdale	Jade Bloor	Renee Michaud	Carla Anaka		Regina, Saskatchewan
Tansy Tober	Stephanie Feeleus	Bryn Zamzow	Erika Campbell		Winnipeg, Manitoba
Andra Todd	Tessa Todd	Ashlee Waldner	Brooklyn Schell		Hazlet, Saskatchewan
Mia Toner	Valerie Ouimet	Justine Toner	Clara Dissanayake		Sudbury, Ontario
Terry Ursel	Wanda Rainka	Brenda Walker	Tracy Igonia		Neepawa, Manitoba
Lydia Vallés Rodríguez	Leire Carasa Lázaro	Oihane Ruiz Díaz	Lucía Majuelo Gandarias	María Olarizu Sedano Parra	San Sebastián, Spain
Danielle Berus (Fourth)	Veerle Geerinckx	Kim Catteceur	Caro van Oosterwyck (Skip)	Annemiek Huiskamp	Zemst, Belgium
Rhonda Varnes	Janelle Lach	Hallie McCannell	Jolene Callum	Sarah-Jane Sass	Portage la Prairie, Manitoba
Noémie Verreault	Nathalie Gagnon	Geneviève Frappier	Marie-Claude Comeau		Quebec, Quebec
Claire Viau	Megan McPhee	Ella Wendling	Ellery Bazley	Ella Fleming	(United States) Stevens Point, Wisconsin
Lauren Wagner	Samantha Bertram	Brianna Wood	Jillian Burkett		Australia
Reese Wainman	Alex Testart-Campbell	Brooke Smith	Tamara Bain		Inuvik, Northwest Territories
Quinn Walsh	Anneka Burghout	McKenna McGovern	Rachel Dobbs	Melissa Retz	Cambridge, Ontario
Meghan Walter	Abby Ackland	Sara Oliver	Mackenzie Elias		Winnipeg, Manitoba
Wang Meini	Zhang Lijun	Yang Ying	Ding Xuexin		Beijing, China
Sarah Wark	Kristen Pilote	Karla Thompson	Amanda Brennan		Abbotsford, British Columbia
Maddy Warriner	Sarah Bailey	Madison Fisher	Shannon Warriner	Kaelyn Gregory	Dundas, Ontario
Anteequa Washington	Njideka Harris-Eze	Jane Eruchalu	Phina Brooks		Accra, Nigeria
Katelyn Wasylkiw	Lauren Wasylkiw	Stephanie Thompson	Erin Way		Whitby, Ontario
Kristy Watling	Hailey McFarlane	Emilie Rafsnon	Sarah Pyke	Laura Burtnyk	Winnipeg, Manitoba
Jennifer Westhagen	Sara Westman	Kristen Tsourlenes	Carlee Millikin	Nicole Hewett	Australia
Nicole Westlund Stewart	Megan Carr	Samantha Morris	Rebecca Carr		Thunder Bay, Ontario
Helen Williams	Karen Titheridge	Adrienne Kennedy	Michelle Fredericks-Armstrong	Kim Irvine	Australia
Bryelle Wong	Morgan Bowles	Alexis Nguyen	Erin Fizgibbon		New Westminster, British Columbia
Rachel Workin	Anya Normandeau	Ann Podoll	Christina Lammers		(United States) Fargo, North Dakota
Isabella Wranå	Almida de Val	Maria Larsson	Linda Stenlund		Sundbyberg, Sweden
Anna Stern (Fourth)	Flurina Kobler	Nora Wüest (Skip)	Karin Winter		Wallisellen, Switzerland
Jessica Wytrychowski	Jessica Koch	Emily Neufeld	Cheryl Damen		Calgary, Alberta
Kateryna Yakymets	Tetiana Hlyvka	Marharyta Opria	Olena Zubarieva		Kyiv, Ukraine
Miyu Ueno (Fourth)	Sae Yamamoto (Skip)	Suzune Yasui	Mizuki Hara	Momoka Iwase	Karuizawa, Japan
Dilşat Yıldız	Öznur Polat	İfayet Şafak Çalıkuşu	Mihriban Polat	Berfin Şengül	Erzurum, Turkey
Sayaka Yoshimura	Kaho Onodera	Anna Ohmiya	Yumie Funayama	Mina Kobayashi	Sapporo, Japan
Lesley Young	Jennifer Marshall	Eilidh Yeats	Rachael Dakers	Maggie Wilson	Stirling, Scotland
Riho Zaikan	Akari Iwatani	Karuna Yamauchi	Ai Kawata	Sachiko Zaikan	Hiroshima, Japan
Maruša Gorišek (Fourth)	Nadja Pipan	Ajda Zavrtanik Drglin (Skip)	Liza Gregori		Ljubljana, Slovenia
Alžběta Zelingrová	Aneta Müllerová	Michaela Baudyšová	Klára Svatoňová		Prague, Czech Republic
Tori Zemmelink	Paige Bown	Kailee Delaney	Scotia Maltman		Navan, Ontario
Zhang Jiaqi	Tan Siting	Tian Linyuan	Li Yongjie		Beijing, China

== Mixed doubles ==
As of December 1, 2022

Female	Male	Locale
Skylar Ackerman	James Gordon	Saskatoon, Saskatchewan
Melissa Adams	Alex Robichaud	Fredericton, New Brunswick
Marlene Albrecht	Matt Wozniak	Zürich, Switzerland / Winnipeg, Manitoba
Flannery Allison	Michael Allison	(United States) Saint Louis, Missouri
Sitora Alliyarova	Viktor Kim	Almaty, Kazakhstan
Sarah Anderson	Andrew Stopera	(United States) Minneapolis, Minnesota
Taylor Anderson	Ben Richardson	(United States) Chaska, Minnesota
Jennifer Armstrong	Brayden Stewart	Regina, Saskatchewan
Tilsimay Alliyarova	Ondasyn Artikbaev	Almaty, Kazakhstan / Tashkent, Uzbekistan
Emma Artichuk	Scott Mitchell	Whitby, Ontario
Tone Aspeli	Lars Aspeli	Hedmarken, Norway
Hannah Augustin	Martin Reichel	Kitzbühel, Austria
Sarah Bailey	Dylan Sipura	St. Catharines, Ontario
Brett Barber	Mitch Heidt	Kerrobert, Saskatchewan
Daina Barone	Arnis Veidemanis	Riga, Latvia
Chantale Barrette	Raphael Beaulieu	Boucherville, Quebec
Olivia Beirnes	Kyle Forster	Elmira, Ontario
Adrienne Belliveau	Connor Deane	Whitby, Ontario
Maia Belway	Cam Weir	Salmon Arm, British Columbia
Julie Benson	Bret Jackson	(United States) Brighton, Michigan
Danae Binette-Lavoie	Jocelyn Lavoie	Abitibi, Quebec
Shannon Birchard	John Morris	Winnipeg, Manitoba / Canmore, Alberta
Regan Birr	Todd Birr	(United States) Ham Lake, Minnesota
Marianne Bisson	Anthony Trudel	Boucherville, Quebec
Florence Boivin	Dmitri Audibert	Chicoutimi, Quebec
Lisenka Bomas	Wouter Gösgens	Zoetermeer, Netherlands
Veronique Bouchard	Jean-François Charest	Saguenay, Quebec
Emily Bowles	Sterling Middleton	Victoria, British Columbia
Lucy Bradshaw	Darrick Kizlyk	(United States) Arvada, Colorado
Shelby Brandt	Grady LaMontagne	Saskatoon, Saskatchewan
Chantele Broderson	Kyler Kleibrink	Edmonton, Alberta
Dacey Brown	Andrew Hodgson	Edmonton, Alberta
Anneka Burghout	Marty Thompson	Toronto, Ontario
Erin Butler	Jordan McNamara	Ottawa, Ontario
Michelle Butler	Jerry Butler	Cambridge, Ontario
Chrissy Cadorin	Rob Ainsley	Toronto, Ontario
Chelsea Carey	Colin Hodgson	Calgary, Alberta / Red Lake, Ontario
Sarah Carlson	Ryan Carlson	(United States) Pewaukee, Wisconsin
Marlise Carter	John Siddall	Sackville, New Brunswick
Carsyn Cassidy	Conor Cassidy	London, Ontario
Gloria Chao	Anthony Fowler	(United States) Chicago, Illinois
Lauren Cheal	Greg Cheal	Lennoxville, Quebec
Stephanie Chen	Ian Robertson	Kingston, Jamaica
Amanda Chou	Brendon Liu	Taipei, Chinese Taipei
Catherine Clifford	Desmond Young	Edmonton, Alberta
Sarah Clifford	Oliver Rosenkrands Søe	Hvidovre, Denmark
Susana Cole	Tijani Cole	Accra, Nigeria
Marie-Claude Comeau	Daniel Bédard	Valleyfield, Quebec
Edith Cottenoir	Yannick Martel	Saguenay, Quebec
Jaelyn Cotter	Jim Cotter	Vernon, British Columbia
Katie Cottrill	Shawn Cottrill	Belgrave, Ontario
Cheryl Damen	Tyler van Amsterdam	Edmonton, Alberta
Hanna Davis	Steve Davis	Mississauga, Ontario
Émilie Desjardins	Robert Desjardins	Saguenay, Quebec
Jennifer Dodds	Bruce Mouat	Stirling, Scotland
Taylor Drees	Joe Heiden	(United States) Saint Paul, Minnesota
Hannah Durrant	Zane Bartlett	Victoria, British Columbia
Angelina Ebauyer	Adil Zhumagozha	Almaty, Kazakhstan
Regina Ebauyer	Muzdybay Kudaibergenov	Almaty, Kazakhstan
Kerri Einarson	Brad Jacobs	Gimli, Manitoba / Sault Ste. Marie, Ontario
Kaidi Elmik	Mihhaik Vlassov	Tallinn, Estonia
Michelle Englot	Derek Schneider	Regina, Saskatchewan
Cora Farrell	Coleman Thurston	(United States) Chaska, Minnesota
Lila Farwell	Seth Taylor	(United States) Golden, Colorado
Aline Fellmann	Chris Kovalchuk	Montreal, Quebec
Melissa Foster	Scott Foster	Burlington, Ontario
Geneviève Frappier	Michel Briand	Montreal, Quebec
Satsuki Fujisawa	Tsuyoshi Yamaguchi	Karuizawa, Japan
Émilia Gagné	Pierre-Luc Morissette	Quebec, Quebec
Nathalie Gagnon	François Gionest	Alma, Quebec
April Gale-Seixeiro	Steve Seixeiro	Lisbon, Portugal
Christie Gamble	Tyler Gamble	Regina, Saskatchewan
Amber Gargul	Leandre Girard	Pointe-Claire, Quebec
Amanda Gebhardt	Andrew Fairfull	Listowel, Ontario
Francoise Gerbaulet	Michel Caie	Montreal, Quebec
Aileen Geving	John Shuster	(United States) Duluth, Minnesota
Kirby Gill	Hunter Clawson	Brisbane, Australia / (United States) Philadelphia, Pennsylvania
Tahli Gill	Dean Hewitt	Brisbane, Australia
Kimberly Glasbergen-Honders	Carlo Glasbergen	Zoetermeer, Netherlands
Lana Gosselin	Dan deWaard	Gatineau, Quebec
Lucrezia Grande	Fabio Ribotta	Pinerolo, Italy
Clancy Grandy	Pat Janssen	Pickering, Ontario
Serena Gray-Withers	Andrew Gittis	Edmonton, Alberta
Sheri Greenman	Michael Zullani	Unionville, Ontario
Diane Gushulak	Patrick Prade	New Westminster, British Columbia
Molly Hackett	Alec Hackett	(United States) Ogden, Utah
Paulina Hajduk	Ján Horáček	Bratislava, Slovakia
Becca Hamilton	Matt Hamilton	(United States) McFarland, Wisconsin
Louise Harkinn	Jakob Moen Bekken	Hedmarken, Norway
Lauren Harrison	Chris Gardner	Toronto, Ontario
Patty Hersikorn	Steve Laycock	Saskatoon, Saskatchewan
Krysta Hilker	Mike Lambert	Edmonton, Alberta
Chantel Hoag	Josh Bryden	Saskatoon, Saskatchewan
Abigail Holmes	Jacob Elsinga	Florenceville, New Brunswick
Grace Holyoke	Thomas Ryan	Toronto, Ontario
Rachel Homan	Tyler Tardi	Ottawa, Ontario / Langley, British Columbia
Erica Hopson	Kevin Tippett	Ottawa, Ontario
Lauren Horton	Pierre-Luc Morissette	Quebec, Quebec
Ashley Howard	Dustin Mikush	Regina, Saskatchewan
Lea Hueppi	Jonas Weiss	Dübendorf, Switzerland
Kaye Hufman	Colin Hufman	(United States) Fairbanks, Alaska
Ling-Yue Hung	Jason Chang	Hong Kong
Keara Hunnisett	Owen Brackpool	Kent, England
Farzana Hussain	Rayad Husain	Leonara, Guyana
Dilyar Ibragimov	Ayazhan Zhumabek	Almaty, Kazakhstan
Lotta Immonen	Markus Sipilä	Hyvinkää, Finland
Alison Ingram	Cole Tenetuik	North Battleford, Saskatchewan
Elin Ingvaldsen	Christer Wibe	Oslo, Norway
Dominique Jean	Pierre-Luc Morissette	Quebec, Quebec
Mona Jensen	Morten Berger	Hvidovre, Denmark
Flippa Jillehed	Pontus Persson	Norrköping, Sweden
Leah Johnston	Andrew Johnston	Victoria, British Columbia
Colleen Jones	Luke Saunders	Halifax, Nova Scotia
Jennifer Jones	Brent Laing	Barrie, Ontario
Mintautė Jurkutė	Paulius Rymeikis	Vilnius, Lithuania
Sherry Just	Ryan Deis	Prince Albert, Saskatchewan
Marie Kaldvee	Harri Lill	Tallinn, Estonia
Ashley Kalk	Craig MacAlpine	Edmonton, Alberta
Vera Kalocsai	Otto Kalocsay	Budapest, Hungary
Svetlana Kan	Abdukarim Zhumabek	Jeonbuk, South Korea / Almaty, Kazakhstan
Casey Kidd	Brad Kidd	Bridgenorth, Ontario
Mackenzie Kiemele	Graham Singer	Guelph, Ontario
Kim Ji-yoon	Jeong Byeong-jin	Seoul, South Korea
Madison Kleiter	Rylan Kleiter	Saskatoon, Saskatchewan
Tori Koana	Go Aoki	Yamanashi, Japan
Yekaterina Kolykhalova	Arman Irjanov	Almaty, Kazakhstan
Akgul Kumar	Georgiy Skupnevskiy	Almaty, Kazakhstan
Stephanie Küpper	Thomas Küpper	Baden, Switzerland
Amanda Kuzyk	Ben Gamble	Regina, Saskatchewan
Audrey Laplante	Jasmin Gibeau	Outaouais, Quebec
Anne Lebrun	Pierre Chartrand	Boucherville, Quebec
Sydney Libbus	Jacob Libbus	Okotoks, Alberta
Aneta Lipińska	Bartosz Dzikowski	Łódź / Warsaw, Poland
Catherine Liscumb	Chris Liscumb	Ilderton, Ontario
Kendra Lister	Daniel Lister	Fredericton, New Brunswick
Grace Lloyd	Landan Rooney	Mississauga, Ontario
Kadriana Lott	Colton Lott	Gimli, Manitoba
Mikaylah Lyburn	William Lyburn	Winnipeg, Manitoba
Amy MacDonald	Adam MacDonald	Woodstock, New Brunswick
Triin Madisson	Karl Kukner	Tallinn, Estonia
Amelie Maheux	Raphael Charbonneau	Saint-Bruno-de-Montarville, Quebec
Meaghan Mallett	Brendan Jackson	Mississauga, Ontario
Nancy Martin	Tyrel Griffith	Saskatoon, Saskatchewan / Kelowna, British Columbia
Chiaki Matsumura	Yasumasa Tanida	Nagano / Hokkaido, Japan
Joyce McLaren	Kevin Mechenbier	(United States) Denver, Colorado
Kelsey Meger	Andrew Peck	Winnipeg, Manitoba
Clare Moores	Lance Wheeler	(United States) Golden, Colorado
Sydney Mullaney	Chase Sinnett	(United States) Chaska, Minnesota
Alyssa Nedohin	Jaxon Hiebert	Sherwood Park, Alberta
Laura Neil	Scott McDonald	St. Thomas, Ontario
Isabelle Néron	Alexandre Ferland	Quebec City, Quebec
Kirstin Nickel	Gabriel Nickel	(United States) Hudson, Wisconsin
Ann Nilsson	Bengt Nilsson	Gothenburg, Sweden
Junko Nishimuro	Saturo Tsukamoto	Yamanashi, Japan
Lisianne Ouellet	Guillaume Rousseau	Rivière-du-Loup, Quebec
Siri Pajasmaa	Sebastian Keiser	Zug, Switzerland
Zuzana Paulová	Tomáš Paul	Prague, Czech Republic
Monique Penney	Jon Penney	(United States) Cincinnati, Ohio
Jenny Perret	Martin Rios	Glarus, Switzerland
Alexia Perron	Simon Laroche	Lennoxville, Quebec
Vicky Persinger	Chris Plys	(United States) Fairbanks, Alaska / Chaska, Minnesota
Cyntia Plouffe	Stéphane Paquette	L'Ange-Gardien, Quebec
Ann Podoll	Nathan Parry	(United States) Fargo, North Dakota
Marlee Powers	Luke Saunders	Halifax, Nova Scotia
Maia Ramsfjell	Magnus Ramsfjell	Trondheim, Norway
Taylor Reese-Hansen	Corey Chester	Victoria, British Columbia
Evita Regža	Ansis Regža	Riga, Latvia
Melissa Remeshylo	Dylan Derksen	Martensville, Saskatchewan
Emily Riley	Jesse Mullen	Montreal, Quebec
Carrie Robertson	Alex Robertson	Palmerston, Ontario
Martine Rønning	Mathias Brænden	Lillehammer, Norway
Harley Rohrbacher	Vincent Scebbi	(United States) Cleveland, Ohio
Dany Roy	Bruno Sonier	Sherbrooke, Quebec
Daniela Rupp	Kevin Wunderlin	Zug, Switzerland
Riley Sandham	Brendan Craig	Guelph, Ontario
Sophie Sanscartier	Maxandre Caron	Boucherville, Quebec
Susanna Säntti	Iikko Säntti	Hyvinkää, Finland
Gulkhan Sarbasbay	Ramazan Sahhiyev	Almaty, Kazakhstan
Cindy Schmid	Martin Risi	Engelberg, Switzerland
Pia-Lisa Schöll	Klaudius Harsch	Füssen / Oberstdorf, Germany
Kristin Skaslien	Magnus Nedregotten	Oslo, Norway
Jill Springer	Garret Springer	Regina, Saskatchewan
Laurie St-Georges	Félix Asselin	Montreal, Quebec
Taylor Stremick	Cody Sutherland	Saskatoon, Saskatchewan
Delaney Strouse	Daniel Casper	(United States) Minneapolis, Minnesota
Arina Tabarina	Ibragim Tastemir	Almaty, Kazakhstan
Valerie Tanguay	Denis Robichaud	Quebec City, Quebec
Merey Tastemir	Aidos Alliyar	Almaty, Kazakhstan
Cory Thiesse	Korey Dropkin	(United States) Duluth, Minnesota
Kelly Tremblay	Pierre Lanoue	Saguenay, Quebec
Kim Tuck	Wayne Tuck Jr.	Strathroy, Ontario
Oihane Unanue	Mikel Unanue	San Sebastián, Spain
Yelizaveta Utochko	Dimitriy Gargul	Almaty, Kazakhstan
Laura Walker	Kirk Muyres	Edmonton, Alberta / Regina, Saskatchewan
Sarah Wark	Andrew Nerpin	Kelowna, British Columbia
Lisa Weagle	John Epping	Ottawa / Toronto, Ontario
Terri Weeks	Sam Steep	Waterloo, Ontario
Therese Westman	Robin Ahlberg	Stockholm, Sweden
Nathalie Wiksten	Kasper Wiksten	Tårnby, Denmark
Courtney Woo	Daniel Wenzek	New Westminster, British Columbia
Olivia Wynter	Cameron Sallaj	Moncton, New Brunswick
Jessica Wytrychowski	Michael Dumont	Calgary, Alberta
Samantha Yachiw	Jordan Raymond	Saskatoon, Saskatchewan
Dilşat Yıldız	Bilal Ömer Çakır	Erzurum, Turkey
Jessica Zheng	Victor Pietrangelo	Niagara Falls, Ontario
Isabelle Zollinger	Stefan Fäh	Baden, Switzerland
Lydia Zukewich	Tanner Kinaschuk	Martensville, Saskatchewan
