= 2020 Quebec Scotties Tournament of Hearts =

- Host city: Salaberry-de-Valleyfield
- Arena: Aréna de Salaberry
- Dates: January 21–26
- Winner: Team Verreault
- Curling club: Club de curling Chicoutimi, Chicoutimi; Glenmore Curling Club, Dollard-des-Ormeaux; Club de curling Trois-Rivières, Trois-Rivières
- Skip: Noémie Verreault
- Third: Alanna Routledge
- Second: Marie-Pier Côté
- Lead: Jill Routledge
- Alternate: Joëlle St-Hilaire
- Finalist: Laurie St-Georges

The 2020 Quebec Scotties Tournament of Hearts, the provincial women's curling championship of Quebec, was held from January 20 to 26 at the Arèna de Salaberry in Salaberry-de-Valleyfield. The winning Noémie Verreault rink represented Quebec at the 2020 Scotties Tournament of Hearts in Moose Jaw, Saskatchewan, and finished with a 0–7 record. The event was held in conjunction with the 2020 Quebec Tankard, the provincial men's curling championship.

== Teams ==
The teams are listed as follows:

Skip	Third	Second	Lead	Alternate	Club(s)
Camille Boisvert	Roxane Perron	Brenda Nicholls	Miriam Perron	Laura Guénard	Etchemin
Lisa Davies	Genevieve Laurier	Alison Davies	Kelly Tremblay		Glenmore/Etchemin
Marianne Girard	Marie-Ève Boudreault	Mélanie Poirier	Roxane Poirier		Victoria
Caroline Hains	Josée Bédard	Nancy Mathieu	Michelle Conway	Guylaine Sauvageau	Belvédère
Émilia Gagné (Fourth)	Gabrielle Lavoie (Skip)	Patricia Boudreault	Julie Daigle	Émilie Desjardins	Victoria/Etchemin/Jacques-Cartier
Laurie St-Georges	Hailey Armstrong	Emily Riley	Cynthia St-Georges	Isabelle Thiboutot	Laval/Glenmore
Julie Tippin	Lauren Mann	Brittany O'Rourke	Pamela Nugent	Trish Shantz	Glenmore
Noémie Verreault	Alanna Routledge	Marie-Pier Côté	Jill Routledge	Joëlle St-Hilaire	Chicoutimi/Glenmore/Trois-Rivières

== Round-robin standings ==
Final round-robin standings

Key
Teams to Playoffs
Teams to Tiebreaker

Skip	W	L
Laurie St-Georges	5	2
Noémie Verreault	5	2
Marianne Girard	4	3
Gabrielle Lavoie	4	3
Camille Boisvert	4	3
Julie Tippin	4	3
Lisa Davies	2	5
Caroline Hains	0	7

== Round-robin results ==
All draws are listed in Eastern Time (UTC−05:00).

=== Draw 5 ===
Tuesday, January 21, 8:15 am

Sheet A	1	2	3	4	5	6	7	8	9	10	Final
Marianne Girard	0	0	3	0	0	1	0	0	0	4	8
Julie Tippin	1	0	0	1	2	0	2	1	0	0	7

Sheet E	1	2	3	4	5	6	7	8	9	10	Final
Laurie St-Georges	0	4	1	1	0	0	2	2	X	X	10
Lisa Davies	0	0	0	0	2	1	0	0	X	X	3

=== Draw 6 ===
Tuesday, January 21, 12:00 pm

Sheet C	1	2	3	4	5	6	7	8	9	10	Final
Gabrielle Lavoie	0	0	0	0	0	1	0	3	X	X	4
Noémie Verreault	0	0	4	1	3	0	2	0	X	X	10

Sheet E	1	2	3	4	5	6	7	8	9	10	11	Final
Caroline Hains	1	0	3	0	3	0	1	0	0	1	0	9
Camille Boisvert	0	2	0	3	0	3	0	1	0	0	1	10

=== Draw 7 ===
Tuesday, January 21, 3:45 pm

Sheet B	1	2	3	4	5	6	7	8	9	10	Final
Marianne Girard	0	1	0	2	0	2	0	0	3	0	8
Laurie St-Georges	2	0	1	0	2	0	2	1	0	1	9

Sheet C	1	2	3	4	5	6	7	8	9	10	Final
Lisa Davies	0	3	0	0	0	X	X	X	X	X	3
Julie Tippin	3	0	3	4	1	X	X	X	X	X	11

=== Draw 8 ===
Tuesday, January 21, 7:30 pm

Sheet D	1	2	3	4	5	6	7	8	9	10	Final
Camille Boisvert	2	0	2	1	0	0	1	0	0	1	7
Noémie Verreault	0	2	0	0	1	0	0	2	1	0	6

Sheet E	1	2	3	4	5	6	7	8	9	10	Final
Gabrielle Lavoie	1	0	2	0	1	0	1	0	4	X	9
Caroline Hains	0	1	0	1	0	0	0	1	0	X	3

=== Draw 9 ===
Wednesday, January 22, 8:15 am

Sheet B	1	2	3	4	5	6	7	8	9	10	Final
Caroline Hains	2	0	1	1	0	0	1	0	0	X	5
Julie Tippin	0	5	0	0	1	1	0	1	1	X	9

Sheet E	1	2	3	4	5	6	7	8	9	10	Final
Noémie Verreault	0	1	0	1	0	2	0	0	1	0	5
Laurie St-Georges	1	0	3	0	0	0	0	1	0	1	6

=== Draw 10 ===
Wednesday, January 22, 12:00 pm

Sheet B	1	2	3	4	5	6	7	8	9	10	Final
Camille Boisvert	0	1	0	0	2	0	3	0	0	X	6
Lisa Davies	1	0	1	2	0	1	0	0	3	X	8

Sheet C	1	2	3	4	5	6	7	8	9	10	Final
Marianne Girard	0	1	0	3	0	1	0	0	0	X	5
Gabrielle Lavoie	0	0	1	0	2	0	1	2	2	X	8

=== Draw 11 ===
Wednesday, January 22, 3:45 pm

Sheet A	1	2	3	4	5	6	7	8	9	10	Final
Julie Tippin	0	0	2	0	1	0	1	0	0	X	4
Noémie Verreault	0	1	0	1	0	1	0	2	2	X	7

Sheet D	1	2	3	4	5	6	7	8	9	10	Final
Caroline Hains	0	0	1	0	1	0	0	2	0	0	4
Laurie St-Georges	0	0	0	2	0	2	0	0	0	1	5

=== Draw 12 ===
Wednesday, January 22, 7:30 pm

Sheet A	1	2	3	4	5	6	7	8	9	10	Final
Camille Boisvert	0	2	0	0	2	0	1	0	X	X	5
Marianne Girard	3	0	1	3	0	1	0	4	X	X	12

Sheet D	1	2	3	4	5	6	7	8	9	10	Final
Gabrielle Lavoie	0	0	0	3	1	0	0	1	0	1	6
Lisa Davies	0	0	0	0	0	1	0	0	1	0	2

=== Draw 13 ===
Thursday, January 23, 9:30 am

Sheet A	1	2	3	4	5	6	7	8	9	10	Final
Laurie St-Georges	0	1	0	0	2	0	0	1	0	3	7
Gabrielle Lavoie	1	0	1	1	0	1	0	0	2	0	6

Sheet C	1	2	3	4	5	6	7	8	9	10	Final
Noémie Verreault	0	3	0	1	2	0	3	0	2	X	11
Caroline Hains	0	0	2	0	0	3	0	2	0	X	7

=== Draw 15 ===
Thursday, January 23, 7:30 pm

Sheet D	1	2	3	4	5	6	7	8	9	10	Final
Julie Tippin	0	2	0	0	1	0	1	0	1	0	5
Camille Boisvert	1	0	1	1	0	1	0	1	0	1	6

Sheet E	1	2	3	4	5	6	7	8	9	10	Final
Lisa Davies	0	0	1	0	0	2	0	0	0	X	3
Marianne Girard	0	1	0	0	2	0	1	1	2	X	7

=== Draw 16 ===
Friday, January 24, 9:30 am

Sheet A	1	2	3	4	5	6	7	8	9	10	Final
Lisa Davies	0	0	1	1	1	0	1	0	0	1	5
Caroline Hains	0	0	0	0	0	1	0	2	1	0	4

Sheet C	1	2	3	4	5	6	7	8	9	10	Final
Laurie St-Georges	0	1	0	0	0	2	0	X	X	X	3
Camille Boisvert	2	0	2	1	2	0	2	X	X	X	9

Sheet D	1	2	3	4	5	6	7	8	9	10	Final
Noémie Verreault	0	1	0	0	3	0	0	2	3	2	11
Marianne Girard	1	0	0	1	0	3	3	0	0	0	8

Sheet E	1	2	3	4	5	6	7	8	9	10	Final
Julie Tippin	0	0	1	0	3	0	2	0	2	2	10
Gabrielle Lavoie	0	1	0	2	0	2	0	2	0	0	7

=== Draw 17 ===
Friday, January 24, 2:30 pm

Sheet B	1	2	3	4	5	6	7	8	9	10	Final
Lisa Davies	0	1	0	1	0	0	1	0	X	X	3
Noémie Verreault	1	0	2	0	3	2	0	1	X	X	9

Sheet C	1	2	3	4	5	6	7	8	9	10	Final
Caroline Hains	0	1	0	1	0	2	0	1	0	X	5
Marianne Girard	3	0	1	0	1	0	1	0	2	X	8

=== Draw 18 ===
Friday, January 24, 7:30 pm

Sheet B	1	2	3	4	5	6	7	8	9	10	Final
Gabrielle Lavoie	0	2	1	0	0	2	0	1	0	0	6
Camille Boisvert	1	0	0	1	1	0	0	0	1	1	5

Sheet C	1	2	3	4	5	6	7	8	9	10	Final
Julie Tippin	0	0	1	1	0	0	5	3	X	X	10
Laurie St-Georges	0	1	0	0	0	2	0	0	X	X	3

== Tiebreaker ==
Saturday, January 25, 10:00 am

Sheet A	1	2	3	4	5	6	7	8	9	10	Final
Marianne Girard	1	1	3	0	3	1	X	X	X	X	9
Gabrielle Lavoie	0	0	0	3	0	0	X	X	X	X	3

== Playoffs ==
Semifinal			Final
			1	Laurie St-Georges	1
2	Noémie Verreault	11	2	Noémie Verreault	3
3	Marianne Girard	5

=== Semifinal ===
Saturday, January 25, 8:00 pm

Sheet B	1	2	3	4	5	6	7	8	9	10	Final
Noémie Verreault	1	0	2	0	1	0	3	2	2	X	11
Marianne Girard	0	1	0	3	0	1	0	0	0	X	5

=== Final ===
Sunday, January 26, 12:00 pm

Sheet B	1	2	3	4	5	6	7	8	9	10	Final
Laurie St-Georges	0	0	0	1	0	0	0	0	0	0	1
Noemie Verreault	0	0	0	0	1	0	0	1	0	1	3

2020 Québec Scotties Tournament of Hearts
(Quebec)
Noemie Verreault
1st Québec Provincial Championship title
