= Alanna Routledge =

Canadian curler

- Curler
- Born: June 25, 1990 (age 36); Montreal, Quebec

Team
- Curling club: Glenmore CC, Dollard-des-Ormeaux, QC

Curling career
- Member Association: Quebec
- Hearts: 3 (2020, 2022, 2023)
- Top CTRS ranking: 176th (2018–19)

Alanna Routledge (born June 25, 1990) is a Canadian curler from Montreal, Quebec.

== Career ==
Routledge represented Quebec in four Canadian Junior Curling Championships during her junior career in 2007, 2008, 2010 and 2011. Her best finish came at the 2008 Canadian Junior Curling Championships where her team skipped by Kristen Richard finished in seventh with a 7–5 record.

As third for the Mike Fournier, Routledge competed in back-to-back Canadian Mixed Curling Championship's in 2013 and 2014. At the 2013 Canadian Mixed Curling Championship, the team won the bronze medal after dropping the semifinal to Ontario's Cory Heggestad.

Out of juniors, Routledge began competing on the women's tour, skipping her own team. After playing in seven straight Quebec Scotties Tournament of Hearts, Routledge won her first women's provincial title at the 2020 Quebec Scotties Tournament of Hearts as third for Noémie Verreault. The team finished the round robin in second place with a 5–2 record and then won the semifinal and championship final to claim the title. At the 2020 Scotties Tournament of Hearts, the team struggled throughout the week and ultimately finished tied for last with a winless 0–7 record. Routledge competed in her second national championship as the alternate for Team Laurie St-Georges in 2022. The team won their opening two matches against Alberta's Laura Walker and the Yukon's Hailey Birnie and their last game against Nova Scotia's Christina Black, ultimately finishing the 2022 Scotties Tournament of Hearts with a 3–5 record.

== Personal life ==
Routledge is employed as the executive director of Curling Québec. She is in a relationship with Dee Rich. She lives in the Lachine borough of Montreal.

== Teams ==
Season	Skip	Third	Second	Lead
2006–07	Alanna Routledge	Kristen Richard	Brittany O'Rourke	Sasha Beauchamp
2007–08	Kristen Richard	Alanna Routledge	Brittany O'Rourke	Sasha Beauchamp
2009–10	Camille-Marie Lapierre	Alanna Routledge	Melanie Maclean	Kelly-Ann Gazdewich
2010–11	Alanna Routledge	Kelly-Ann Gazdewich	Melanie Maclean	Joëlle St-Hilaire
2011–12	Allison Ross	Kristen Richards	Alanna Routledge	Brittany O'Rourke
2012–13	Julie Hamel	Alanna Routledge	Marie-Pier Côté	Joëlle St-Hilaire
2013–14	Alanna Routledge	Sian Canavan	Laura Wood	Joëlle St-Hilaire
2014–15	Lisa Davies	Alanna Routledge	Alison Davies	Joëlle St-Hilaire
2015–16	Camille-Marie Lapierre	Alanna Routledge	Alison Davies	Joëlle St-Hilaire
2016–17	Camille Lapierre	Alanna Routledge	Vicky Tremblay	Jill Routledge
2018–19	Noémie Verreault	Alanna Routledge	Émilie Desjardins	Jill Routledge
2019–20	Noémie Verreault	Alanna Routledge	Marie-Pier Côté	Jill Routledge
2022–23	Laurie St-Georges	Emily Riley	Alanna Routledge	Kelly Middaugh
