= Noémie Verreault =

Canadian curler (born 1988)

- Curler
- Other names: Noémie Audet-Verreault
- Born: May 25, 1988 (age 38); Alma, Quebec

Team
- Curling club: CC Chicoutimi, Chucoutimi, QC
- Skip: Noémie Verreault
- Third: Nathalie Gagnon
- Second: Geneviève Frappier
- Lead: Marie-Claude Comeau
- Mixed doubles partner: Remi Savard

Curling career
- Member Association: Quebec
- Hearts: 1 (2020)
- Top CTRS ranking: 106th (2023–24)

Noémie Audet-Verreault (born May 25, 1988) is a Canadian curler from Alma, Quebec. She currently skips her own team out of Chicoutimi.

== Career ==
Verreault represented Quebec at back to back Canadian Mixed Curling Championships in 2009 and 2010 as third for Simon Hébert. In both years, the team finished with a 4–7 record, missing the playoffs.

Ten years later, Verreault won the 2020 Quebec Scotties Tournament of Hearts where her rink of Alanna Routledge, Marie-Pier Côté and Jill Routledge upset the Laurie St-Georges team in the provincial final. At the 2020 Scotties Tournament of Hearts, the team struggled throughout the week and ultimately finished tied for last with a winless 0–7 record.

== Personal life ==
Verrault works as a research nurse for Ecogène-21. She is married to Matthieu Tremblay and has one daughter, Éva-Rose.

== Teams ==
Season	Skip	Third	Second	Lead
2010–11	Julie Hamel	Noémie Verreault	Marie-Pier Côté	Joëlle St-Hilaire
2016–17	Isabelle Néron	Noémie Verreault	Marie-Pier Côté	Laurie Verreault
2017–18	Isabelle Néron	Noémie Verreault	Marie-Pier Côté	Émilie Desjardins
2018–19	Noémie Verreault	Alanna Routledge	Émilie Desjardins	Jill Routledge
2019–20	Noémie Verreault	Alanna Routledge	Marie-Pier Côté	Jill Routledge
2020–21	Noémie Verreault	Nathalie Gagnon	Geneviève Frappier	Marie-Claude Comeau
2022–23	Noémie Verreault	Nathalie Gagnon	Geneviève Frappier	Marie-Claude Comeau
2023–24	Noémie Verreault	Nathalie Gagnon	Anne-Sophie Gionest	Sarah Bergeron
