= 2016 Canadian Direct Insurance BC Men's Curling Championship =

- Host city: Nelson, British Columbia
- Arena: Nelson Curling Club
- Dates: February 10–14
- Winner: Jim Cotter
- Curling club: Vernon Curling Club & Kelowna Curling Club
- Skip: Jim Cotter
- Third: Ryan Kuhn
- Second: Tyrel Griffith
- Lead: Rick Sawatsky
- Finalist: Sean Geall

The 2016 Canadian Direct Insurance BC Men's Curling Championship were held from February 10 to 14 at the Nelson Curling Club in Nelson, British Columbia. The winning Jim Cotter rink represented British Columbia at the 2016 Tim Hortons Brier in Ottawa.

== Qualification process ==
Sixteen teams qualified for the provincial tournament through several methods. The qualification process is as follows:

Qualification method	Berths	Qualifying team
Defending champion from previous year	1	Jim Cotter
CTRS points leaders (December 1, 2014 – December 1, 2015)	2	Dean Joanisse; Sean Geall
Island Playdown qualifier (Dec. 11–13)	2	Wes Craig; Neil Dangerfield
Lower Mainland Playdown qualifier (Dec. 11–13)	4	Michael Johnson; Chase Martyn; Stephen Schneider; Tyler Tardi
Okanagan Playdown qualifier (Dec. 12–13)	2	Jeff Richard; Mark Longworth
Kootenay Playdown qualifier (Dec. 12–13)	2	Tom Buchy; Chris Ducharme
Open Qualification Round (Jan. 8–10)	3	Jason Montgomery; Glen Jackson; Will House

== Teams ==
The teams are listed as follows:

Skip	Third	Second	Lead	Alternate	Locale(s)
Tom Buchy	Deane Horning	Dave Toffolo	Darren Will		Kimberley Curling Club, Kimberley
Wes Craig	Scott MacDonald	Tony Anslow	Victor Gamble		Victoria Curling Club, Victoria
Jim Cotter	Ryan Kuhn	Tyrel Griffith	Rick Sawatsky		Vernon Curling Club, Vernon; Kelowna Curling Club, Kelowna
Neil Dangerfield	Dennis Sutton	Darren Boden	Glen Allen		Victoria Curling Club, Victoria
Chris Ducharme	Josh Firman	Jim Stewart	Jim Macaulay	Brendan Stead	Creston Curling Club, Creston
Sean Geall	Andrew Bilesky	Steve Kopf	Mark Olson		Royal City Curling Club, New Westminster
Will House	Kelly McQuiggan	Greg Davis	Thomas Sayer		Richmond Curling Club, Richmond
Glen Jackson	Andrew Komlodi	Corey Chester	Joel Cave		Victoria Curling Club, Victoria
Dean Joanisse	Paul Cseke	Jay Wakefield	John Cullen		Royal City Curling Club, New Westminster
Michael Johnson	Ty Dilello	Chris Baier	Mitch Young		Royal City Curling Club, New Westminster
Mark Longworth	Michael Longworth	Jonathan Gardner	John Slattery		Vernon Curling Club, Vernon
Chase Martyn	Cody Johnston	Jeff Guignard	Will Sutton	Jeff Sargent	Royal City Curling Club, New Westminster
Jason Montgomery	Miles Craig	Cameron Dejong	Dave McGarry		Victoria Curling Club, Victoria
Jeff Richard	Ted Appelman	Bryan Kedziora	David Harper		Kelowna Curling Club, Kelowna
Stephen Schneider	Jamie Sexton	Shawn Eklund	Brant Amos		Vancouver Curling Club, Victoria
Daniel Wenzek*	Jordan Tardi	Nicholas Meister			Langley Curling Club, Langley; Royal City Curling Club, New Westminster

*Regular skip Tyler Tardi could not play due to his participation at the 2016 Winter Youth Olympics. Records indicate they only had a three player team.

== Knockout Draw Brackets ==
The draw is listed as follows:

=== A Event ===
First Knockout
Jim Cotter	6
Will House	3
Jason Montgomery	4
Chase Martyn	9
Jeff Richard	5
Glen Jackson	6
Tom Buchy	8
Mark Longworth	3
Dean Joanisse	5
Chris Ducharme	2
Michael Johnson	4
Stephen Schneider	3
Sean Geall	11
Daniel Wenzek	10
Neil Dangerfield	7
Wes Craig	10

Quarterfinals
Jim Cotter	9
Chase Martyn	2
Glen Jackson	4
Tom Buchy	2
Dean Joanisse	3
Michael Johnson	6
Sean Geall	6
Wes Craig	7

Semifinals
Jim Cotter	7
Glen Jackson	4
Michael Johnson	6
Wes Craig	4

Qualifier 1
Jim Cotter	5
Michael Johnson	4

=== B Event ===
Second Knockout
Jeff Richard	11
Mark Longworth	10
Neil Dangerfield	3
Daniel Wenzek	9

Quarterfinals
Chase Martyn	5
Jeff Richard	10
Dean Joanisse	7
Daniel Wenzek	8

Semifinals
Jeff Richard	6
Wes Craig	3
Daniel Wenzek	4
Glen Jackson	6

To Qualifier 2
Jeff Richard	6
Glen Jackson	7
Qualifier 2
Glen Jackson	1
Sean Geall	5

Second Knockout
Will House	6
Jason Montgomery	8
Stephen Schneider	6
Chris Ducharme	7

Quarterfinals
Tom Buchy	8
Jason Montgomery	6
Sean Geall	9
Chris Ducharme	3

Semifinals
Tom Buchy	3
Sean Geall	10

To Qualifier 2
Michael Johnson	2
Sean Geall	6

=== C Event ===
Third Knockout
Neil Dangerfield	6
Chase Martyn	5
Dean Joanisse	8
Stephen Schneider	2

Quarterfinals
Neil Dangerfield	9
Tom Buchy	8
Dean Joanisse	9
Wes Craig	0

Semifinals
Neil Dangerfield	8
Jeff Richard	2
Dean Joanisse	8
Michael Johnson	4

Qualifier 3
Neil Dangerfield	4
Dean Joanisse	5

Third Knockout
Will House	6
Mark Longworth	4

Quarterfinals
Chris Ducharme	7
Will House	4
Jason Montgomery	9
Daniel Wenzek	8

Semifinals
Chris Ducharme	1
Jason Montgomery	8

Qualifier 4
Glen Jackson	7
Jason Montgomery	4

== Playoffs ==
Page playoff system
A	Jim Cotter	5
B	Sean Geall	1
C1	Dean Joanisse	5
C2	Glen Jackson	2

Semifinal
B	Sean Geall	4
C1	Dean Joanisse	2

Final
A	Jim Cotter	7
B	Sean Geall	6

=== A vs. B ===
Saturday, February 13, 2:00 pm

Team	1	2	3	4	5	6	7	8	9	10	Final
Jim Cotter 🔨	0	1	0	0	1	0	0	0	3	X	5
Sean Geall	0	0	0	0	0	1	0	0	0	X	1

=== C1 vs. C2 ===
Saturday, February 13, 7:00 pm

Team	1	2	3	4	5	6	7	8	9	10	Final
Dean Joanisse 🔨	0	0	1	0	0	2	0	2	0	X	5
Glen Jackson	0	1	0	1	0	0	0	0	0	X	2

=== Semifinal ===
Sunday, February 14, 11:00 am

Team	1	2	3	4	5	6	7	8	9	10	Final
Sean Geall 🔨	0	1	0	2	0	1	0	0	0	X	4
Dean Joanisse	0	0	0	0	1	0	1	0	0	X	2

=== Final ===
Sunday, February 14, 4:00 pm

Team	1	2	3	4	5	6	7	8	9	10	Final
Jim Cotter 🔨	0	1	1	1	0	1	0	3	0	0	7
Sean Geall	0	0	0	0	1	0	2	0	2	1	6

2016 Canadian Direct Insurance BC Men's Championship

Jim Cotter
6th British Columbia Provincial Championship title
