= 2013 Canadian Direct Insurance BC Men's Curling Championship – Qualification =

Qualification for the 2013 Canadian Direct Insurance BC Men's Curling Championship consisted of both direct and indirect qualification. The defending champion and the highest-ranked team on the Canadian Team Ranking System qualified directly. Fourteen more teams qualified through playdown events and qualification events.

== Summary ==
| Qualification method | Berths | Qualifying team |
|---|---|---|
| Defending champion from previous year | 1 | Jim Cotter |
| CTRS points leader (December 1, 2011 – December 1, 2012) | 1 | Brent Pierce |
| Kootenay Inter-regional qualifier (Dec. 7–9) | 2 | Deane Horning; Tom Buchy |
| Thompson/Okanagan Inter-regional qualifier (Dec. 7–9) | 2 | Trevor Perepolkin; Jamie Sexton |
| Island Playdown qualifier (Dec. 7–9) | 2 | Jason Montgomery; Jay Tuson |
| Lower Mainland Playdown qualifier (Dec. 14–16) | 3 | Sean Geall; Jay Wakefield; Ken McArdle |
| Open Qualification Round (Jan. 4–6) | 5 | Neil Dangerfield; Dean Joanisse; Brent Yamada; Richard Brower; Andrew Bilesky |

== Qualification events ==
=== Kootenay Inter-regional qualifier ===
The Kootenay Inter-regional qualifier was held from December 7 to 9, 2012 at the Trail Curling Club in Trail.

==== Teams ====
The teams are listed as follows:

| Skip | Third | Second | Lead | Alternate | Locale(s) |
|---|---|---|---|---|---|
| Tom Buchy | Dave Stephenson | Dave Toffolo | Darren Will | | Kimberley Curling Club, Kimberley |
| Doug Hannah | Laddie Pavlis | Doug Thompson | Bryan Smithson | | Creston Curling Club, Creston |
| Deane Horning | Don Freschi | Rob Nobert | Brad Wood | Kevin Nesbitt | Trail Curling Club, Trail |
| Brian LeMoel | Joe Ferguson | Marcus Partridge | Jack Beard | Rob Ferguson | Trail Curling Club, Trail |
| Myron Nichol | Garry Beaudry | Stew Higgins | Rob Babiarz | | Castlegar Curling Club, Castlegar |
| Brent Pihowich | Barry Marsh | Roger May | Jamie Tedesco | Rod MacCabe | Nelson Curling Club, Nelson |
| Nando Salviulo | Rick Cutler | Grant Davidson | Chris Haynes | Doug Bothamley | Nelson Curling Club, Nelson |
| Tom Shypitka | Josh Firman | Steve Tersmette | Greg Terrill | | Creston Curling Club, Creston |

==== Results ====
===== A Event =====
| First Knockout | | Semifinals | | To Playoffs |
| Deane Horning | 11 |
| Brian LeMoel | 3 | Deane Horning | 10 |
| Doug Hannah | 4 | Myron Nichol | 8 |
| Myron Nichol | 11 | | | Deane Horning | 4 |
| Tom Buchy | 9 | | | Tom Buchy | 5 |
| Nando Salviulo | 3 | Tom Buchy | 9 |
| Brent Pihowich | 4 | Tom Shypitka | 3 |
| Tom Shypitka | 9 |

===== B Event =====
Second Knockout
Brian LeMoel | 4
Doug Hannah | 8
Nando Salviulo | 9
Brent Pihowich | 11

Quarterfinals
Doug Hannah | 2
Tom Shypitka | 8
Brent Pihowich | 3
Myron Nichol | 10

Semifinals
Tom Shypitka | 8
Myron Nichol | 5

To Playoffs
Tom Shypitka | 7
Deane Horning | 9

===== C Event =====
| Third Knockout | | To Playoffs |
| Brian LeMoel | 9 |
| Nando Salviulo | 7 | Brian LeMoel | 7 |
| | | Myron Nichol | 9 |

| Third Knockout | | To Playoffs |
| Doug Hannah | 8 |
| Brent Pihowich | 9 | Brent Pihowich | 4 |
| | | Tom Shypitka | 6 |

===== Playoffs =====
| Qualifier 1 |
| 1 | Tom Buchy | 5 |
| 2 | Deane Horning | 7 |

| Semifinals | | Qualifier 2 |
| | | Tom Buchy | 7 |
| Myron Nichol | 9 | Myron Nichol | 2 |
| Tom Shypitka | 7 |

=== Thompson/Okanagan Inter-regional qualifier ===
The Thompson/Okanagan Inter-regional qualifier was held from December 7 to 9, 2012 at the Kelowna Curling Club in Kelowna.

==== Teams ====
The teams are listed as follows:

| Skip | Third | Second | Lead | Alternate | Locale(s) |
|---|---|---|---|---|---|
| Scott DeCap | Ron Douglas | John Maskiewich | Grant Olsen | Russell Koffski | Kamloops Curling Club, Kamloops |
| Darren Heath | Dave Merklinger | John Slattery | David Harper | | Vernon Curling Club, Vernon |
| Aron Herrick | Tobin Senum | Marc Fillion | Jason Wizniak | | Vernon Curling Club, Vernon |
| Darrell Houston | Sean Matheson | Kurt Roberts | Tyler Jaegar | | Kelowna Curling Club, Kelowna |
| David Mellof | Keith Anderson | Mark Thomsen | Larry Kozachenko | | Kelowna Curling Club, Kelowna |
| Justin Nillson | Mitchell Ursel | Cam Weir | Dean Jones | | Kelowna Curling Club, Kelowna |
| Trevor Perepolkin | Tyler Orme | James McKenzie | Chris Anderson | | Vernon Curling Club, Vernon |
| Jamie Sexton | Michael Longworth | Hugh Bennet | Jonathan Gardner | Mark Longworth | Vernon Curling Club, Vernon |
| Brad Thompson (fourth) | Michael Smith (skip) | Brent Thompson | Derek Simpson | | Kamloops Curling Club, Kamloops |
| Brent Yamada | Corey Sauer | Doug Murdoch | Lance Yamada | | Kamloops Curling Club, Kamloops |

==== Results ====
===== A Event =====
First Knockout
David Mellof | 7
Justin Nillson | 6
Michael Smith | 5
Jamie Sexton | 4

Quarterfinals
David Mellof | 5
Trevor Perepolkin | 7
Brent Yamada | 8
Darrell Houston | 7
Michael Smith | 2
Darren Heath | 7
Scott DeCap | 9
Aron Herrick | 5

Semifinals
Trevor Perepolkin | 7
Brent Yamada | 2
Darren Heath | 4
Scott DeCap | 7

To Playoffs
Trevor Perepolkin | 9
Scott DeCap | 4

===== B Event =====
Second Knockout
Justin Nillson | 6
Darrell Houston | 10
Jamie Sexton | 9
Aron Herrick | 2

Quarterfinals
Darrell Houston | 5
Michael Smith | 6
Jamie Sexton | 1
David Mellof | 8
Darren Heath
Brent Yamada

Semifinals
Scott DeCap | 6
Michael Smith | 7
David Mellof | 8
Darren Heath | 4

To Playoffs
Michael Smith | 7
David Mellof | 5

===== C Event =====
| Third Knockout | | To Playoffs |
| | | David Mellof | 4 |
| Jamie Sexton | 7 | Jamie Sexton | 9 |
| Brent Yamada | 6 |

Third Knockout
Justin Nillson | 2
Aron Herrick | 9

Semifinals
Aron Herrick | 7
Scott DeCap | 11
Darrell Houston | 5
Darren Heath | 8

To Playoffs
Scott DeCap | 6
Darren Heath | 1

===== Playoffs =====
| Qualifier 1 |
| 1 | Trevor Perepolkin | 9 |
| 2 | Michael Smith | 6 |

| Semifinals | | Qualifier 2 |
| Scott DeCap | 6 |
| Jamie Sexton | 7 | Jamie Sexton | 8 |
| | | Michael Smith | 7 |

=== Island Playdown qualifier ===
The Island Playdown qualifier was held from December 7 to 9, 2012 at the Alberni Valley Curling Club in Port Alberni.

==== Teams ====
The teams are listed as follows:

| Skip | Third | Second | Lead | Locale(s) |
|---|---|---|---|---|
| Cliff Carr-Hilton | Benjamin Ruginis | Ross Thomson | Craig Bernes | Comox Valley Curling Club, Courtenay |
| Jason Clarke | Ken Miscovitch | Will Sutton | Zachary Capron | Victoria Curling Club, Victoria |
| Wes Craig | Murray Walker | Tony Anslow | Kevin Britt | Victoria Curling Club, Victoria |
| Neil Dangerfield | Denis Sutton | Darren Boden | Glen Allen | Victoria Curling Club, Victoria |
| Jody Epp | Blair Cusack | Brad Kocurek | James York | Victoria Curling Club, Victoria |
| Greg Hawkes | Mike Wood | Sean Cromarty | Paul Awalt | Victoria Curling Club, Victoria |
| Owen Hayward | Chris Brown | Adam McPherson | Steve Eng | Alberni Valley Curling Club, Port Alberni |
| Jason Montgomery | Miles Craig | Will Duggan | Josh Hozack | Victoria Curling Club, Victoria |
| Jay Tuson | Colin Mantik | Glen Jackson | Ken Tucker | Victoria Curling Club, Victoria |
| Steve Waatainen | Kevin Weinreich | Sean Krepps | Keith Clarke | Nanaimo Curling Club, Nanaimo |

==== Results ====
===== A Event =====
First Knockout
Wes Craig | 10
Cliff Carr-Hilton | 3
Jason Clarke | 11
Owen Hayward | 2

Quarterfinals
Wes Craig | 6
Neil Dangerfield | 7
Jay Tuson | 8
Jody Epp | 6
Jason Clarke | 4
Greg Hawkes | 3
Jason Montgomery | 6
Steve Waatainen | 7

Semifinals
Neil Dangerfield | 6
Jay Tuson | 9
Jason Clarke | 6
Steve Waatainen | 5

To Playoffs
Jay Tuson | 8
Jason Clarke | 5

===== B Event =====
Second Knockout
Cliff Carr-Hilton | 2
Jody Epp | 9
Owen Hayward | 3
Jason Montgomery | 5

Quarterfinals
Jody Epp | 9
Greg Hawkes | 8
Jason Montgomery | 8
Wes Craig | 6
Steve Waatainen | 4
Neil Dangerfield | 7

Semifinals
Jason Clarke | 2
Jody Epp | 9
Jason Montgomery | 7
Neil Dangerfield | 6

To Playoffs
Jody Epp | 5
Jason Montgomery | 7

===== C Event =====
| Third Knockout | | To Playoffs |
| | | Jody Epp | 11 |
| Wes Craig | 7 | Wes Craig | 4 |
| Steve Waatainen | 0 |

Third Knockout
Cliff Carr-Hilton | 9
Owen Hayward | 8

Semifinals
Cliff Carr-Hilton | 1
Jason Clarke | 8
Greg Hawkes | 10
Neil Dangerfield | 7

To Playoffs
Jason Clarke | 4
Greg Hawkes | 8

===== Playoffs =====
| Qualifier 1 |
| 1 | Jay Tuson | 3 |
| 2 | Jason Montgomery | 7 |

| Semifinals | | Qualifier 2 |
| Jody Epp | 0 |
| Greg Hawkes | 7 | Greg Hawkes | 3 |
| | | Jay Tuson | 8 |

=== Lower Mainland Playdown qualifier ===
The Lower Mainland Playdown qualifier was held from December 14 to 16, 2012 at the Chilliwack Curling Club in Chilliwack.

==== Teams ====
The teams are listed as follows:

| Skip | Third | Second | Lead | Alternate | Locale |
|---|---|---|---|---|---|
| Andrew Bilesky | Steve Kopf | Derek Errington | Aaron Watson | | Royal City Curling Club, New Westminster |
| Shane Bourdage | Aaron Thompson | Aaron Brice | Chris Hall | | Vancouver Curling Club, Vancouver |
| Sean Geall | Jay Peachey | Sebastien Robillard | Mark Olson | | Royal City Curling Club, New Westminster |
| George Hall | Christopher Ordog | Greg Ohashi | Logan Chinski | | Vancouver Curling Club, Vancouver |
| Dale Hockley | Rick Jones | Kevin Jones | Robert Hockley | Matt Prinse | Chilliwack Curling Club, Chilliwack |
| Todd Leighton | Ken Britz | Darren Jarvis | Adam Dyck | Glen Ford | Chilliwack Curling Club, Chilliwack |
| Ken McArdle | Dylan Somerton | Jared Bowles | Michael Horita | | Royal City Curling Club, New Westminster |
| Bryan Miki | Jay Batch | Ernie Daniels | Curtis Tateyama | Dwayne Uyede | Delta Thistle Curling Club, Delta |
| John Molendyk | Tom Sayer | Greg Davis | Eric Cessford | | Marpole Curling Club, Vancouver |
| Stephen Schneider | Brant Amos | Shawn Eklund | Chris Faa | | Vancouver Curling Club, Vancouver |
| Allan Vanderveen | Bobby Neid | Adam Dyble | Rob Hornsby | | Chilliwack Curling Club, Chilliwack |
| Michael Johnson (fourth) | Paul Cseke | Jay Wakefield (skip) | John Cullen | | Royal City Curling Club, New Westminster |

==== Results ====
===== A Event =====
First Knockout
John Molendyk | 6
George Hall | 10
Allan Vanderveen | 5
Bryan Miki | 8
Shane Bourdage | 5
Stephen Schneider | 7
Dale Hockley | 7
Todd Leighton | 6

Quarterfinals
George Hall | 5
Sean Geall | 7
Bryan Miki | 4
Ken McArdle | 9
Stephen Schneider | 0
Jay Wakefield | 5
Dale Hockley | 7
Andrew Bilesky | 8

Semifinals
Sean Geall | 8
Ken McArdle | 2
Jay Wakefield | 8
Andrew Bilesky | 4

Qualifier 1
Sean Geall | 6
Jay Wakefield | 2

===== B Event =====
Second Knockout
John Molendyk | 6
Allan Vanderveen | 1
Shane Bourdage | 7
Todd Leighton | 3
George Hall | 7
Bryan Miki | 3
Stephen Schneider | 2
Dale Hockley | 9

Quarterfinals
John Molendyk | 8
Shane Bourdage | 4
George Hall | 3
Andrew Bilesky | 6
Ken McArdle | 4
Dale Hockley | 5

Semifinals
John Molendyk | 5
Jay Wakefield | 6
Andrew Bilesky | 5
Dale Hockley | 1

Qualifier 2
Jay Wakefield | 7
Andrew Bilesky | 1

===== C Event =====
First Knockout
Stephen Schneider | 7
Bryan Miki | 8
Todd Leighton | 10
Allan Vanderveen | 4
Ken McArdle | 7
George Hall | 5

Quarterfinals
Shane Bourdage | 4
Bryan Miki | 9
Todd Leighton | 2
Dale Hockley | 7
John Molendyk | 6
Ken McArdle | 8

Semifinals
Bryan Miki | 3
Andrew Bilesky | 8
Dale Hockley | 3
Ken McArdle | 6

Qualifier 1
Andrew Bilesky | 8
Ken McArdle | 9

=== Open Qualification Round ===
The Open Qualification Round was held from January 4 to 6 at the Golden Ears Winter Club in Maple Ridge.

==== Teams ====
The teams are listed as follows:

| Skip | Third | Second | Lead | Alternate | Locale(s) |
|---|---|---|---|---|---|
| Andrew Bilesky | Steve Kopf | Derek Errington | Aaron Watson | | Royal City Curling Club, New Westminster |
| Richard Brower | Jan Bos | Ted Stanyer | Deryk Brower | | Peace Arch Curling Club, White Rock |
| Wes Craig | Murray Walker | Tony Anslow | Kevin Britt | | Victoria Curling Club, Victoria |
| Neil Dangerfield | Denis Sutton | Darren Boden | Glen Allen | | Victoria Curling Club, Victoria |
| Andrew Forrest | Christopher Chute | Nigel McInnis | Kris Davis | Norm Richard | Vancouver Curling Club, Vancouver |
| Dale Hockley | Rick Jones | Kevin Jones | Robert Hockley | Matt Prinse | Chilliwack Curling Club, Chilliwack |
| Will House | Adam Pankratz | David Pankratz | Jason Beatch | | Royal City Curling Club, New Westminster |
| Dean Joanisse | Bryan Kedziora | Mike Goerz | Randie Shen | | Abbotsford Curling Club, Abbotsford |
| Patrick McEachran | Glen McEachran | Austin Sweeney | Trevor Halvorson | | North Shore Curling Club, North Vancouver |
| Bryan Miki | Jay Batch | Ernie Daniels | Curtis Tateyama | Dwayne Uyede | Delta Thistle Curling Club, Delta |
| John Molendyk | Tom Sayer | Greg Davis | Eric Cessford | | Marpole Curling Club, Vancouver |
| Garth Moore | Fred Fox | Murray Day | Alan Schmelzel | Doug Turner | Golden Ears Winter Club, Maple Ridge; Coquitlam Curling Club, Coquitlam |
| Peter Nielson | Evan Branter | Kyle Duncan | David MacDonald | | Golden Ears Winter Club, Maple Ridge |
| Stephen Schneider | Brant Amos | Shawn Eklund | Chris Faa | | Vancouver Curling Club, Vancouver |
| Brad Thompson | Michael Smith | Brent Thompson | Derek Simpson | | Kamloops Curling Club, Kamloops |
| Steve Waatainen | Kevin Weinreich | Sean Krepps | Keith Clarke | | Nanaimo Curling Club, Nanaimo |
| Brent Yamada | Corey Sauer | Doug Murdoch | Lance Yamada | | Kamloops Curling Club, Kamloops |

==== Results ====
===== A Event =====
First Knockout
Stephen Schneider | 3
Peter Nielson | 7

Quarterfinals
Peter Nielson | 6
Andrew Bilesky | 10
Dale Hockley | 9
Andrew Forrest | 6
Bryan Miki | 6
Brad Thompson | 7
Dean Joanisse | 4
Garth Moore | 7

Semifinals
Andrew Bilesky | 8
Dale Hockley | 6
Brad Thompson | 7
Garth Moore | 4

To Qualifier 1
Andrew Bilesky | 8
Brad Thompson | 2
Qualifier 1
Andrew Bilesky | 5
Neil Dangerfield | 8

| First Knockout | | Semifinals | | To Qualifier 1 |
| Brent Yamada | 9 |
| Richard Brower | 8 | Brent Yamada | 5 |
| Steve Waatainen | 9 | Steve Waatainen | 8 |
| John Molendyk | 2 | | | Steve Waatainen | 3 |
| Wes Craig | 8 | | | Neil Dangerfield | 11 |
| Will House | 3 | Wes Craig | 6 |
| Neil Dangerfield | 8 | Neil Dangerfield | 11 |
| Patrick McEachran | 2 |

===== B Event =====
Second Knockout
Bryan Miki | 7
Dean Joanisse | 8

Quarterfinals
Dean Joanisse | 8
Peter Nielson | 4
Richard Brower | 9
John Molendyk | 8

Semifinals
Wes Craig | 6
Dean Joanisse | 9
Richard Brower | 6
Dale Hockley | 2

To Qualifier 2
Dean Joanisse | 6
Richard Brower | 3
Qualifier 2
Dean Joanisse | 7
Andrew Bilesky | 6

Second Knockout
Stephen Schneider | 8
Andrew Forrest | 3
Will House | 5
Patrick McEachran | 10

Quarterfinals
Stephen Schneider | 8
Garth Moore | 4
Patrick McEachran | 2
Brent Yamada | 5

Semifinals
Stephen Schneider | 10
Steve Waatainen | 1
Brent Yamada | 10
Brad Thompson | 9

Qualifier 3
Stephen Schneider | 5
Brent Yamada | 6

===== C Event =====
Third Knockout
Peter Nielson | 5
Dale Hockley | 9
Andrew Forrest | 2
Will House | 9

Semifinals
Dale Hockley | 10
Stephen Schneider | 6
Will House | 4
Richard Brower | 8

Qualifier 4
Dale Hockley | 6
Richard Brower | 7

Third Knockout
Garth Moore | 9
Patrick McEachran | 2
Bryan Miki | 8
John Molendyk | 3

Quarterfinals
Garth Moore | 4
Wes Craig | 8
Bryan Miki | 7
Steve Waatainen | 6

Semifinals
Brad Thompson | 10
Wes Craig | 7
Bryan Miki | 4
Andrew Bilesky | 7

Qualifier 4
Brad Thompson | 5
Andrew Bilesky | 6
