= 2014 Canadian Direct Insurance BC Men's Curling Championship =

- Host city: Vancouver, British Columbia
- Arena: Vancouver Curling Club
- Dates: February 4–9
- Winner: John Morris
- Curling club: Kelowna Curling Club, Kelowna
- Skip: John Morris
- Fourth: Jim Cotter
- Second: Tyrel Griffith
- Lead: Rick Sawatsky
- Finalist: Jason Montgomery

The 2014 Canadian Direct Insurance BC Men's Curling Championship, the provincial men's curling championship for British Columbia, was held from February 4 to 9 at the Vancouver Curling Club in Vancouver, British Columbia. The winning team of John Morris represented the home province of British Columbia at the 2014 Tim Hortons Brier in Kamloops.

== Qualification process ==
Sixteen teams will qualify for the provincial tournament through several methods. The qualification process is as follows:

| Qualification method | Berths | Qualifying team |
|---|---|---|
| Defending champion from previous year | 1 | Andrew Bilesky |
| CTRS points leader (December 1, 2012 – December 1, 2013) | 1 | John Morris |
| Okanagan Playdown qualifier (Dec. 14–15) | 2 | Jeff Richard; Scott Decap |
| Island Playdown qualifier (Dec. 13–15) | 2 | Neil Dangerfield; Jason Montgomery |
| Northern Playdown qualifier (Dec. 7–8) | 1 | Bill Cameron |
| Lower Mainland Playdown qualifier (Dec. 6–8) | 3 | Dean Joanisse; Grant Dezura; Brent Pierce |
| Kootenay Playdown qualifier (Dec. 6–8) | 2 | Tom Buchy; Trevor Perepolkin |
| Open Qualification Round (Jan. 10–12) | 4 | Chris Baier; Ken McArdle; Mark Longworth; Brent Yamada |

== Teams ==
The teams are listed as follows:

| Skip | Third | Second | Lead | Alternate | Locale(s) |
|---|---|---|---|---|---|
| Andrew Bilesky | Steve Kopf | Derek Errington | Aaron Watson | | Royal City Curling Club, New Westminster |
| Jim Cotter (fourth) | John Morris (skip) | Tyrel Griffith | Rick Sawatsky | | Kelowna Curling Club, Kelowna |
| Jeff Richard | Tom Shypitka | Jay Wakefield | David Harper | | Kelowna Curling Club, Kelowna |
| Scott Decap | Ron Douglas | Pat Decap | Grant Olsen | John Maskiewich | Kamloops Curling Club, Kamloops |
| Neil Dangerfield | Denis Sutton | Darren Boden | Glen Allen | Will Sutton | Victoria Curling Club, Victoria |
| Jody Epp (fourth) | Jason Montgomery (skip) | Miles Craig | Will Duggan | | Victoria Curling Club, Victoria |
| Bill Cameron | Cale Rusnell | Mike Hansen | London Blundell | | Prince George Curling Club, Prince George |
| Michael Johnson (fourth) | Dean Joanisse (skip) | Paul Cseke | John Cullen | | Royal City Curling Club, New Westminster |
| Grant Dezura | Kevin MacKenzie | Jamie Smith | Kevin Recksiedler | Jay Peachey | Golden Ears Curling Club, Maple Ridge |
| Sean Geall (fourth) | Brent Pierce (skip) | Sebastien Robillard | Mark Olson | Ken Maskiewich | Royal City Curling Club, New Westminster |
| Tom Buchy | Fred Thomson | Dave Toffolo | Darren Will | | Kimberley Curling Club, Kimberley |
| Trevor Perepolkin | Deane Horning | Tyler Orme | Don Freschi | Kevin Nesbitt | Castlegar Curling Club, Castlegar |
| Chris Baier | Josh Hozack | Corey Chester | Andrew Komlodi | Glen Jackson | Victoria Curling Club, Victoria |
| Ken McArdle | Chase Martyn | Dylan Somerton | Cody Johnston | | Royal City Curling Club, New Westminster |
| Mark Longworth | Jamie Sexton | Hugh Bennett | Michael Longworth | | Vernon Curling Club, Vernon; Salmon Arm Curling Club, Salmon Arm |
| Brent Yamada | Corey Sauer | Tyler Klymchuk | Lance Yamada | | Kamloops Curling Club, Kamloops |

== Knockout Draw Brackets ==
The draw is listed as follows:

=== A Event ===
First Knockout
Andrew Bilesky | 8
Bill Cameron | 2
Neil Dangerfield | 10
Tom Buchy | 4
Jeff Richard | 3
Scott DeCap | 7
Dean Joanisse | 7
Ken McArdle | 2
John Morris | 9
Mark Longworth | 3
Trevor Perepolkin | 2
Jason Montgomery | 7
Brent Pierce | 7
Brent Yamada | 6
Grant Dezura | 8
Chris Baier | 5

Quarterfinals
Andrew Bilesky | 6
Neil Dangerfield | 11
Scott DeCap | 6
Dean Joanisse | 4
John Morris | 8
Jason Montgomery | 1
Brent Pierce | 6
Grant Dezura | 5

Semifinals
Neil Dangerfield | 9
Scott DeCap | 1
John Morris | 7
Brent Pierce | 2

Qualifier 1
Neil Dangerfield | 5
John Morris | 6

=== B Event ===
Second Knockout
Jeff Richard | 8
Ken McArdle | 4
Trevor Perepolkin | 8
Chris Baier | 5

Quarterfinals
Jeff Richard | 10
Jason Montgomery | 6
Trevor Perepolkin | 6
Andrew Bilesky | 5

Semifinals
Jeff Richard | 7
Scott DeCap | 4
Trevor Perepolkin | 3
Brent Pierce | 10

To Qualifier 2
Jeff Richard | 3
Brent Pierce | 6
Qualifier 2
Brent Pierce | 6
Brent Yamada | 4

Second Knockout
Bill Cameron | 4
Tom Buchy | 10
Mark Longworth | 7
Brent Yamada | 9

Quarterfinals
Tom Buchy | 2
Grant Dezura | 8
Brent Yamada | 6
Dean Joanisse | 3

Semifinals
Grant Dezura | 4
Brent Yamada | 5

To Qualifier 2
Neil Dangerfield | 4
Brent Yamada | 8

=== C Event ===
Third Knockout
Ken McArdle | 7
Andrew Bilesky | 5
Jason Montgomery | 10
Mark Longworth | 2

Quarterfinals
Ken McArdle | 8
Grant Dezura | 5
Jason Montgomery | 8
Trevor Perepolkin | 6

Semifinals
Ken McArdle | 4
Jeff Richard | 5
Jason Montgomery | 9
Neil Dangerfield | 8

Qualifier 3
Jeff Richard | 6
Jason Montgomery | 12

Third Knockout
Chris Baier | 8
Bill Cameron | 2

Quarterfinals
Chris Baier | 4
Dean Joanisse | 8
Tom Buchy | 8
Scott DeCap | 5

Semifinals
Dean Joanisse | 6
Tom Buchy | 8

Qualifier 4
Brent Yamada | 4
Tom Buchy | 10

== Playoffs ==
Page playoff system
A | John Morris | 9
B | Brent Pierce | 8
C1 | Jason Montgomery | 9
C2 | Tom Buchy | 1

Semifinal
B | Brent Pierce | 7
C1 | Jason Montgomery | 8

Final
A | John Morris | 11
C1 | Jason Montgomery | 2

=== A vs. B ===
Saturday, February 8, 11:00 am

| Sheet B | 1 | 2 | 3 | 4 | 5 | 6 | 7 | 8 | 9 | 10 | Final |
|---|---|---|---|---|---|---|---|---|---|---|---|
| John Morris 🔨 | 2 | 0 | 0 | 1 | 0 | 0 | 2 | 0 | 0 | 4 | 9 |
| Brent Pierce | 0 | 2 | 0 | 0 | 0 | 3 | 0 | 2 | 1 | 0 | 8 |

=== C1 vs. C2 ===
Saturday, February 8, 11:00 am

| Team | 1 | 2 | 3 | 4 | 5 | 6 | 7 | 8 | 9 | 10 | Final |
|---|---|---|---|---|---|---|---|---|---|---|---|
| Jason Montgomery 🔨 | 3 | 1 | 3 | 0 | 2 | X | X | X | X | X | 9 |
| Tom Buchy | 0 | 0 | 0 | 1 | 0 | X | X | X | X | X | 1 |

=== Semifinal ===
Saturday, February 8, 7:00 pm

| Sheet B | 1 | 2 | 3 | 4 | 5 | 6 | 7 | 8 | 9 | 10 | 11 | Final |
|---|---|---|---|---|---|---|---|---|---|---|---|---|
| Brent Pierce 🔨 | 0 | 1 | 0 | 3 | 0 | 0 | 0 | 1 | 1 | 1 | 0 | 7 |
| Jason Montgomery | 0 | 0 | 1 | 0 | 3 | 2 | 1 | 0 | 0 | 0 | 1 | 8 |

=== Final ===
Sunday, February 9, 4:00 pm

| Sheet B | 1 | 2 | 3 | 4 | 5 | 6 | 7 | 8 | 9 | 10 | Final |
|---|---|---|---|---|---|---|---|---|---|---|---|
| John Morris 🔨 | 3 | 0 | 2 | 1 | 0 | 0 | 4 | 1 | X | X | 11 |
| Jason Montgomery | 0 | 1 | 0 | 0 | 0 | 1 | 0 | 0 | X | X | 2 |

2014 Canadian Direct Insurance BC Men's Curling Championship

John Morris
1st British Columbia Provincial Championship title
