= 2015 Canadian Direct Insurance BC Men's Curling Championship =

- Host city: Vernon, British Columbia
- Arena: Vernon Curling Club
- Dates: February 3–8
- Winner: Jim Cotter
- Curling club: Vernon CC, Vernon; Kelowna CC, Kelowna
- Skip: Jim Cotter
- Third: Ryan Kuhn
- Second: Tyrel Griffith
- Lead: Rick Sawatsky
- Finalist: Dean Joanisse

The 2015 Canadian Direct Insurance BC Men's Curling Championship was held from February 3 to 8 at the Vernon Curling Club in Vernon, British Columbia. The winning Jim Cotter team represented British Columbia at the 2015 Tim Hortons Brier in Calgary.

== Qualification process ==
Sixteen teams will qualify for the provincial tournament through several methods. The qualification process is as follows:

Qualification method	Berths	Qualifying team
Defending champion from previous year	1	Jim Cotter
CTRS points leader (December 1, 2013 – December 1, 2014)	1	Brent Pierce
Okanagan Playdown qualifier (Dec. 12–14)	2	Scott DeCap; Darren Nelson
Island Playdown qualifier (Dec. 12–14)	3	Neil Dangerfield; Chris Baier; Jason Montgomery
Lower Mainland Playdown qualifier (Dec. 12–14)	4	Sean Geall; Ken McArdle; Stephen Schneider; Grant Dezura
Kootenay Playdown qualifier (Dec. 5–7)	1	Tom Buchy
Open Qualification Round (Jan. 9–11)	4	Dean Joanisse; Daniel Wenzek; Mark Longworth; Wes Craig

== Teams ==
The teams are listed as follows:

Skip	Third	Second	Lead	Alternate	Locale(s)
Chris Baier	Michael Johnson	Corey Chester	Sanjay Bowry		Victoria Curling Club, Victoria
Tom Buchy	Dave Stephenson	Dave Toffolo	Darren Will		Kimberley Curling Club, Kimberley
Wes Craig	Scott MacDonald	Tony Anslow	Victor Gamble		Victoria Curling Club, Victoria
Jim Cotter	Ryan Kuhn	Tyrel Griffith	Rick Sawatsky		Vernon Curling Club, Vernon; Kelowna Curling Club, Kelowna
Neil Dangerfield	Denis Sutton	Darren Boden	Glen Allen		Victoria Curling Club, Victoria
Scott DeCap	Ron Douglas	Pat DeCap	Grant Olsen		Kamloops Curling Club, Kamloops
Grant Dezura	Kevin MacKenzie	Kevin Recksiedler	Jamie Smith		Golden Ears Curling Club, Maple Ridge
Sean Geall	Andrew Bilesky	Steve Kopf	Mark Olson		Royal City Curling Club, New Westminster
Dean Joanisse	Paul Cseke	Jay Wakefield	John Cullen		Royal City Curling Club, New Westminster
Mark Longworth	Michael Longworth	Jonathan Gardner	John Slattery		Vernon Curling Club, Vernon
Ken McArdle	Chase Martyn	Cody Johnston	Will Sutton		Royal City Curling Club, New Westminster
Jason Montgomery	Jody Epp	Miles Craig	Will Duggan		Duncan Curling Club, North Cowichan
Darren Nelson	Russ Koffski	Jared Jenkins	Adam Windsor		Kamloops Curling Club, Kamloops
Brent Pierce	Jeff Richard	Tyler Orme	David Harper		Kelowna Curling Club, Kelowna
Stephen Schneider	Jeff Guignard	Shawn Eklund	Brant Amos	Jamie Sexton	Vancouver Curling Club, Vancouver
Daniel Wenzek	Nicholas Meister	Calvin Heels	Byron Heels		Royal City Curling Club, New Westminster; Langley Curling Club, Langley

== Knockout Draw Brackets ==
The draw is listed as follows:

=== A Event ===
First Knockout
Jim Cotter	8
Daniel Wenzek	5
Ken McArdle	7
Chris Baier	1
Grant Dezura	4
Stephen Schneider	3
Dean Joanisse	7
Darren Nelson	4
Brent Pierce	7
Mark Longworth	4
Jason Montgomery	7
Tom Buchy	8
Sean Geall	10
Wes Craig	2
Neil Dangerfield	5
Scott DeCap	6

Quarterfinals
Jim Cotter	5
Ken McArdle	4
Grant Dezura	7
Dean Joanisse	11
Brent Pierce	6
Tom Buchy	8
Sean Geall	8
Scott DeCap	1

Semifinals
Jim Cotter	10
Dean Joanisse	9
Tom Buchy	8
Sean Geall	3

A Qualifier
Jim Cotter	5
Tom Buchy	3

=== B Event ===
Second Knockout
Stephen Schneider	3
Darren Nelson	9
Jason Montgomery	4
Neil Dangerfield	9

Quarterfinals
Darren Nelson	0
Brent Pierce	7
Neil Dangerfield	10
Ken McArdle	5

Semifinals
Brent Pierce	5
Dean Joanisse	6
Neil Dangerfield	1
Sean Geall	8

To B Qualifier
Dean Joanisse	7
Sean Geall	6
B Qualifier
Dean Joanisse	8
Tom Buchy	6

Second Knockout
Daniel Wenzek	8
Chris Baier	6
Mark Longworth	8
Wes Craig	7

Quarterfinals
Daniel Wenzek	13
Scott DeCap	2
Mark Longworth	9
Grant Dezura	8

Semifinals
Daniel Wenzek	5
Mark Longworth	6

To B Qualifier
Tom Buchy	8
Mark Longworth	6

=== C Event ===
Third Knockout
Stephen Schneider	7
Ken McArdle	8
Darren Nelson	7
Wes Craig	5

Quarterfinals
Ken McArdle	9
Daniel Wenzek	5
Darren Nelson	7
Neil Dangerfield	4

Semifinals
Ken McArdle	6
Mark Longworth	8
Darren Nelson	7
Sean Geall	6

C Qualifier 1
Mark Longworth	6
Darren Nelson	5

Third Knockout
Jason Montgomery	7
Chris Baier	6

Quarterfinals
Jason Montgomery	8
Grant Dezura	6
Scott DeCap	3
Brent Pierce	8

Semifinals
Jason Montgomery	4
Brent Pierce	8

C Qualifier 2
Tom Buchy	3
Brent Pierce	8

== Playoffs ==
Page playoff system
A	Jim Cotter	5
B	Dean Joanisse	8
C1	Mark Longworth	6
C2	Brent Pierce	9

Semifinal
A	Jim Cotter	7
C2	Brent Pierce	6

Final
B	Dean Joanisse	6
A	Jim Cotter	7

=== A vs. B ===
Saturday, February 7, 11:00 am

Team	1	2	3	4	5	6	7	8	9	10	Final
Jim Cotter 🔨	3	0	0	0	1	0	1	0	0	X	5
Dean Joanisse	0	2	1	1	0	2	0	1	1	X	8

=== C1 vs. C2 ===
Saturday, February 7, 11:00 am

Team	1	2	3	4	5	6	7	8	9	10	Final
Mark Longworth	0	0	0	2	0	0	2	0	2	X	6
Brent Pierce 🔨	0	1	2	0	2	2	0	2	0	X	9

=== Semifinal ===
Saturday, February 7, 7:00 pm

Team	1	2	3	4	5	6	7	8	9	10	11	Final
Jim Cotter 🔨	0	2	0	0	0	2	0	2	0	0	1	7
Brent Pierce	1	0	1	0	1	0	2	0	0	1	0	6

=== Final ===
Sunday, February 8, 12:30 pm

Team	1	2	3	4	5	6	7	8	9	10	11	Final
Dean Joanisse 🔨	0	1	0	2	0	0	0	2	0	1	0	6
Jim Cotter	0	0	2	0	2	1	0	0	1	0	1	7

2015 Canadian Direct Insurance BC Men's Championship

Jim Cotter
5th British Columbia Provincial Championship title
