= 2011 Westcoast Curling Classic =

World Curling Tour event

- Host city: New Westminster, British Columbia
- Arena: Royal City Curling Club
- Dates: October 7–10
- Winner: (Alberta) Kevin Martin
- Curling club: Saville SC, Edmonton
- Skip: Kevin Martin
- Third: John Morris
- Second: Marc Kennedy
- Lead: Ben Hebert
- Finalist: (Manitoba) Mike McEwen

The 2011 Westcoast Curling Classic was held from October 7 to 10 at the Royal City Curling Club in New Westminster, British Columbia as part of the 2011–12 World Curling Tour. The purse for the event was CAD$80,000. The event was played in a triple knockout format.

== Teams ==
Skip	Third	Second	Lead	Locale
Brent Bawel	Mike Jantzen	Sean O'Connor	Hardi Sulimma	Calgary, Alberta
Sean Beighton	Andrew Ernst	Sam Galey	Mac Guy	(Washington (state)) Seattle, Washington
Andrew Bilesky	Stephen Kopf	Derek Errington	Aaron Watson	New Westminster, British Columbia
Jim Cotter	Kevin Folk	Tyrel Griffith	Rick Sawatsky	Kelowna/Vernon, British Columbia
Carl deConinck Smith	Jeff Sharp	Chris Haichert	Jesse St. John	Rosetown, Saskatchewan
David Nedohin (fourth)	Randy Ferbey (skip)	Ted Appelman	Brendan Melnyk	Edmonton, Alberta
Bryan Kedziora	Ron Leech	Mike Goerz	Dwayne Uyede	Maple Ridge, British Columbia
Kevin Koe	Pat Simmons	Carter Rycroft	Nolan Thiessen	Edmonton, Alberta
Steve Laycock	Joel Jordison	Brennen Jones	Dallan Muyres	Saskatoon, Saskatchewan
Kevin Martin	John Morris	Marc Kennedy	Ben Hebert	Edmonton, Alberta
Mike McEwen	B. J. Neufeld	Matt Wozniak	Denni Neufeld	Winnipeg, Manitoba
Dave Merklinger				Vernon, British Columbia
Dean Joanisse (fourth)	Tyler Klitch	Bryan Miki (skip)	Jay Batch	New Westminster, British Columbia
Jason Montgomery	Mike Wood	Miles Craig	William Duggan	Duncan, British Columbia
Yusuke Morozumi	Tsuyoshi Yamaguchi	Tetsuro Shimizu	Kosuke Morozumi	Karuizawa, Japan
Dan Petryk (fourth)	Steve Petryk (skip)	Colin Hodgson	Brad Chyz	Calgary, Alberta
Jeff Richard (fourth)	Brent Pierce (skip)	Kevin Recksiedler	Grant Dezura	New Westminster, British Columbia
Robert Schlender	Chris Lemishka	Darcy Hafso	Don Bartlett	Edmonton, Alberta
Randie Shen	Brendon Liu	Nicolas Hsu	Jan-Quinn Yu	Taipei City, Chinese Taipei
Alexey Tselousov	Andrey Drozdov	Alexey Stukalsky	Aleksey Kamnev	Moscow, Russia
Markku Uusipaavalniemi	Toni Anttila	Kasper Hakunti	Joni Ikonen	Helsinki, Finland
Brock Virtue	J. D. Lind	Dominic Daemen	Matthew Ng	Calgary, Alberta
Mike Johnson (fourth)	Chris Baier	Jay Wakefield (skip)	John Cullen	New Westminster, British Columbia
Darren Nelson (fourth)	Brad Wood (skip)	Darin Gerow	Cal Jackson	Vernon, British Columbia

== Knockout results ==
=== A event ===
First Knockout		Semifinals		Qualifier 1
(Alberta) Kevin Martin	7
(British Columbia) Dave Merklinger	3	(Alberta) Kevin Martin	7
(Saskatchewan) Carl deConinck Smith	5	(Saskatchewan) Carl deConinck Smith	6
(Finland) Markku Uusipaavalniemi	4			(Alberta) Kevin Martin	7
(Alberta) Robert Schlender	5			(Alberta) Randy Ferbey	2
(British Columbia) Jay Wakefield	7	(British Columbia) Jay Wakefield	0
(Alberta) Randy Ferbey	6	(Alberta) Randy Ferbey	7
(British Columbia) Brad Wood	3

First Knockout		Semifinals		Qualifier 2
(Alberta) Kevin Koe	6
(British Columbia) Andrew Bilesky	5	(Alberta) Kevin Koe	8
(Alberta) Steve Petryk	5	(Alberta) Steve Petryk	4
(British Columbia) Bryan Miki	1			(Alberta) Kevin Koe	10
(Saskatchewan) Steve Laycock	7			(Saskatchewan) Steve Laycock	3
(Washington (state)) Sean Beighton	3	(Saskatchewan) Steve Laycock	5
(Alberta) Brent Bawel	8	(Alberta) Brent Bawel	3
(Japan) Yusuke Morozumi	7

First Knockout		Semifinals		Qualifier 3
(Manitoba) Mike McEwen	8
(British Columbia) Bryan Kedziora	6	(Manitoba) Mike McEwen	2
(British Columbia) Jason Montgomery	5	(British Columbia) Brent Pierce	8
(British Columbia) Brent Pierce	6			(British Columbia) Brent Pierce	6
(British Columbia) Jim Cotter	7			(Alberta) Brock Virtue	3
(Chinese Taipei) Randie Shen	2	(British Columbia) Jim Cotter	4
(Alberta) Brock Virtue	7	(Alberta) Brock Virtue	8
(Russia) Alexey Tselousov	3

=== B event ===
Second Knockout
(British Columbia) Dave Merklinger	2
(Finland) Markku Uusipaavalniemi	4
(Alberta) Robert Schlender	9
(British Columbia) Brad Wood	6

Quarterfinals
(Manitoba) Mike McEwen	8
(Finland) Markku Uusipaavalniemi	4
(British Columbia) Jim Cotter	6
(Alberta) Robert Schlender	5

Semifinals
(Manitoba) Mike McEwen	3
(British Columbia) Jim Cotter	6

Qualifier 4
(British Columbia) Jim Cotter	7
(Saskatchewan) Steve Laycock	3

Second Knockout
(British Columbia) Andrew Bilesky	5
(British Columbia) Bryan Miki	6
(Washington (state)) Sean Beighton	0
(Japan) Yusuke Morozumi	11

Quarterfinals
(Saskatchewan) Carl deConinck Smith	7
(British Columbia) Bryan Miki	1
(British Columbia) Jay Wakefield	6
(Japan) Yusuke Morozumi	4

Semifinals
(Saskatchewan) Carl deConinck Smith	7
(British Columbia) Jay Wakefield	6

Qualifier 5
(Saskatchewan) Carl deConinck Smith	7
(Alberta) Brock Virtue	1

Second Knockout
(British Columbia) Bryan Kedziora	3
(British Columbia) Jason Montgomery	7
(Chinese Taipei) Randie Shen	2
(Russia) Alexey Tselousov	5

Quarterfinals
(Alberta) Steve Petryk	5
(British Columbia) Jason Montgomery	4
(Alberta) Brent Bawel	9
(Russia) Alexey Tselousov	4

Semifinals
(Alberta) Steve Petryk	4
(Alberta) Brent Bawel	5

Qualifier 6
(Alberta) Brent Bawel	4
(Alberta) Randy Ferbey	5

=== C event ===
Third Knockout
(British Columbia) Bryan Miki	6
(Japan) Yusuke Morozumi	5
(British Columbia) Jason Montgomery	8
(Russia) Alexey Tselousov	5

Quarterfinals
(Finland) Markku Uusipaavalniemi	7
(Alberta) Robert Schlender	4
(British Columbia) Bryan Miki	4
(Alberta) Steve Petryk	8
(Manitoba) Mike McEwen	7
(British Columbia) Jason Montgomery	1

Semifinals
(Finland) Markku Uusipaavalniemi	6
(Alberta) Steve Petryk	7
(Manitoba) Mike McEwen	6
(Alberta) Brock Virtue	5

Qualifier 7
(Alberta) Steve Petryk	5
(Manitoba) Mike McEwen	6

Third Knockout
(British Columbia) Dave Merklinger	5
(British Columbia) Brad Wood	6
(British Columbia) Andrew Bilesky	8
(Washington (state)) Sean Beighton	3
(British Columbia) Bryan Kedziora	7
(Chinese Taipei) Randie Shen	2

Quarterfinals
(British Columbia) Brad Wood	3
(British Columbia) Jay Wakefield	6
(British Columbia) Andrew Bilesky	5
(British Columbia) Bryan Kedziora	4

Semifinals
(Alberta) Brent Bawel	7
(British Columbia) Jay Wakefield	8
(Saskatchewan) Steve Laycock	5
(British Columbia) Andrew Bilesky	2

Qualifier 8
(British Columbia) Jay Wakefield	5
(Saskatchewan) Steve Laycock	6

== Playoffs ==
Quarterfinals
(Alberta) Kevin Martin	9
(Saskatchewan) Steve Laycock	1
(Alberta) Randy Ferbey	7
(British Columbia) Jim Cotter	4
(Alberta) Kevin Koe	0
(Manitoba) Mike McEwen	6
(British Columbia) Brent Pierce	4
(Saskatchewan) Cark deConinck Smith	5

Semifinals
(Alberta) Kevin Martin	6
(Alberta) Randy Ferbey	4
(Manitoba) Mike McEwen	6
(Saskatchewan) Cark deConinck Smith	4

Final
(Alberta) Kevin Martin	5
(Manitoba) Mike McEwen	2
