= 2013 Canadian Direct Insurance BC Men's Curling Championship =

- Host city: Parksville, British Columbia
- Arena: Parksville Curling Club
- Dates: February 6–10
- Winner: Andrew Bilesky
- Curling club: Royal City CC, New Westminster
- Skip: Andrew Bilesky
- Third: Steve Kopf
- Second: Derek Errington
- Lead: Aaron Watson
- Finalist: Brent Pierce

The 2013 Canadian Direct Insurance BC Men's Curling Championship was held from February 6 to 10 at the Parksville Curling Club in Parksville, British Columbia. The winner of the BC Men's Curling Championship will represent British Columbia at the 2013 Tim Hortons Brier in Edmonton.

== Qualification process ==
Sixteen teams will qualify for the provincial tournament through several methods. The qualification process is as follows:

Qualification method	Berths	Qualifying team
Defending champion from previous year	1	Jim Cotter
CTRS points leader (December 1, 2011 – December 1, 2012)	1	Brent Pierce
Kootenay Inter-regional qualifier (Dec. 7–9)	2	Deane Horning; Tom Buchy
Thompson/Okanagan Inter-regional qualifier (Dec. 7–9)	2	Trevor Perepolkin; Jamie Sexton
Island Playdown qualifier (Dec. 7–9)	2	Jason Montgomery; Jay Tuson
Lower Mainland Playdown qualifier (Dec. 14–16)	3	Sean Geall; Jay Wakefield; Ken McArdle
Open Qualification Round (Jan. 4–6)	5	Neil Dangerfield; Dean Joanisse; Brent Yamada; Richard Brower; Andrew Bilesky

== Teams ==
The teams are listed as follows:

Skip	Third	Second	Lead	Alternate	Locale(s)
Jim Cotter	Jason Gunnlaugson	Tyrel Griffith	Rick Sawatsky		Kelowna Curling Club, Kelowna
Brent Pierce	Jeff Richard	Kevin Recksiedler	Grant Dezura		Royal City Curling Club, New Westminster
Deane Horning	Don Freschi	Rob Nobert	Brad Wood	Kevin Nesbitt	Trail Curling Club, Trail
Tom Buchy	Dave Stephenson	Dave Toffolo	Darren Will		Kimberley Curling Club, Kimberley
Trevor Perepolkin	Tyler Orme	James McKenzie	Chris Anderson		Vernon Curling Club, Vernon
Mark Longworth	Jamie Sexton	Hugh Bennet	Michael Longworth		Vernon Curling Club, Vernon
Jason Montgomery	Miles Craig	Will Duggan	Josh Hozack		Victoria Curling Club, Victoria
Jay Tuson	Colin Mantik	Glen Jackson	Ken Tucker		Victoria Curling Club, Victoria
Sean Geall	Jay Peachey	Sebastien Robillard	Mark Olson		Royal City Curling Club, New Westminster
Michael Johnson (fourth)	Paul Cseke	Jay Wakefield (skip)	John Cullen		Royal City Curling Club, New Westminster
Ken McArdle	Dylan Somerton	Jared Bowles	Michael Horita		Royal City Curling Club, New Westminster
Neil Dangerfield	Denis Sutton	Darren Boden	Glen Allen		Victoria Curling Club, Victoria
Dean Joanisse	Bryan Kedziora	Mike Goerz	Randie Shen		Abbotsford Curling Club, Abbotsford
Brent Yamada	Corey Sauer	Doug Murdoch	Lance Yamada		Kamloops Curling Club, Kamloops
Richard Brower	Jan Bos	Ted Stanyer	Deryk Brower		Peace Arch Curling Club, White Rock
Andrew Bilesky	Steve Kopf	Derek Errington	Aaron Watson		Royal City Curling Club, New Westminster

== Knockout Draw Brackets ==
The draw is listed as follows:

=== A event ===
First Knockout
Jim Cotter	12
Richard Brower	3
Deane Horning	2
Andrew Bilesky	7
Neil Dangerfield	12
Jay Tuson	3
Jay Wakefield	4
Ken McArdle	8
Sean Geall	11
Brent Yamada	5
Jason Montgomery	8
Tom Buchy	2
Trevor Perepolkin	6
Dean Joanisse	5
Brent Pierce	7
Mark Longworth	5

Quarterfinals
Jim Cotter	5
Andrew Bilesky	8
Neil Dangerfield	7
Ken McArdle	4
Sean Geall	7
Jason Montgomery	6
Trevor Perepolkin	6
Brent Pierce	8

Semifinals
Andrew Bilesky	10
Neil Dangerfield	9
Sean Geall	6
Brent Pierce	5

Qualifier 1
Andrew Bilesky	4
Sean Geall	9

=== B event ===
Second Knockout
Richard Brower	4
Deane Horning	5
Brent Yamada	4
Tom Buchy	10

Quarterfinals
Deane Horning	6
Ken McArdle	5
Tom Buchy	9
Trevor Perepolkin	4

Semifinals
Deane Horning	5
Brent Pierce	9
Tom Buchy	6
Neil Dangerfield	8

To Qualifier 2
Brent Pierce	10
Neil Dangerfield	6
Qualifier 2
Brent Pierce	7
Andrew Bilesky	6

Second Knockout
Jay Tuson	1
Jay Wakefield	10
Dean Joanisse	6
Mark Longworth	10

Quarterfinals
Jay Wakefield	1
Jim Cotter	6
Mark Longworth	9
Jason Montgomery	5

Semifinals
Jim Cotter	8
Mark Longworth	3

To Qualifier 2
Andrew Bilesky	7
Jim Cotter	6

=== C event ===
Third Knockout
Richard Brower	8
Jay Tuson	5
Ken McArdle	3
Trevor Perepolkin	9

Quarterfinals
Richard Brower	4
Tom Buchy	10
Trevor Perepolkin	6
Mark Longworth	5

Semifinals
Tom Buchy	9
Jim Cotter	5
Trevor Perepolkin	8
Neil Dangerfield	5

Qualifier 3
Tom Buchy	7
Trevor Perepolkin	6

Third Knockout
Brent Yamada	5
Dean Joanisse	6

Quarterfinals
Dean Joanisse	2
Deane Horning	10
Jason Montgomery	4
Jay Wakefield	5

Semifinals
Deane Horning	4
Jay Wakefield	5

Qualifier 4
Andrew Bilesky	9
Jay Wakefield	8

== Knockout results ==
=== Draw 1 ===
Wednesday, February 6, 9:00 am

Sheet 1	1	2	3	4	5	6	7	8	9	10	Final
Jim Cotter	2	0	0	1	2	0	1	0	6	X	12
Richard Brower	0	1	1	0	0	0	0	1	0	X	3

Sheet 2	1	2	3	4	5	6	7	8	9	10	Final
Deane Horning	0	0	0	0	1	0	1	0	0	0	2
Andrew Bilesky	1	0	0	0	0	2	0	1	1	2	7

Sheet 3	1	2	3	4	5	6	7	8	9	10	Final
Neil Dangerfield	0	2	3	2	1	1	0	3	X	X	12
Jay Tuson	1	0	0	0	0	0	2	0	X	X	3

Sheet 4	1	2	3	4	5	6	7	8	9	10	Final
Jay Wakefield	0	2	0	1	0	0	1	0	X	X	4
Ken McArdle	0	0	3	0	1	0	0	4	X	X	8

Sheet 5	1	2	3	4	5	6	7	8	9	10	Final
Sean Geall	0	2	3	1	1	1	0	0	3	X	11
Brent Yamada	2	0	0	0	0	0	2	1	0	X	5

=== Draw 2 ===
Wednesday, February 6, 2:00 pm

Sheet 1	1	2	3	4	5	6	7	8	9	10	Final
Neil Dangerfield	0	3	1	1	1	1	0	0	0	X	7
Ken McArdle	0	0	0	0	0	0	1	2	1	X	4

Sheet 2	1	2	3	4	5	6	7	8	9	10	Final
Brent Pierce	0	0	2	1	0	2	0	1	0	1	7
Mark Longworth	0	0	0	0	2	0	1	0	2	0	5

Sheet 3	1	2	3	4	5	6	7	8	9	10	Final
Trevor Perepolkin	2	0	1	0	1	0	1	1	0	0	6
Dean Joanisse	0	2	0	1	0	0	0	0	2	0	5

Sheet 4	1	2	3	4	5	6	7	8	9	10	Final
Andrew Bilesky	1	0	0	0	0	3	0	1	0	3	8
Jim Cotter	0	3	0	2	0	0	0	0	0	0	5

Sheet 5	1	2	3	4	5	6	7	8	9	10	Final
Jason Montgomery	2	2	0	1	0	3	X	X	X	X	8
Tom Buchy	0	0	1	0	1	0	X	X	X	X	2

=== Draw 3 ===
Wednesday, February 6, 7:30 pm

Sheet 1	1	2	3	4	5	6	7	8	9	10	Final
Neil Dangerfield	0	3	1	1	1	1	0	0	0	X	7
Ken McArdle	0	0	0	0	0	0	1	2	1	X	4

Sheet 2	1	2	3	4	5	6	7	8	9	10	Final
Brent Pierce	0	0	2	1	0	2	0	1	0	1	7
Mark Longworth	0	0	0	0	2	0	1	0	2	0	5

Sheet 3	1	2	3	4	5	6	7	8	9	10	Final
Trevor Perepolkin	2	0	1	0	1	0	1	1	0	0	6
Dean Joanisse	0	2	0	1	0	0	0	0	2	0	5

Sheet 4	1	2	3	4	5	6	7	8	9	10	Final
Andrew Bilesky	1	0	0	0	0	3	0	1	0	3	8
Jim Cotter	0	3	0	2	0	0	0	0	0	0	5

Sheet 5	1	2	3	4	5	6	7	8	9	10	Final
Jason Montgomery	2	2	0	1	0	3	X	X	X	X	8
Tom Buchy	0	0	1	0	1	0	X	X	X	X	2

=== Draw 4 ===
Thursday, February 7, 9:00 am

Sheet 1	1	2	3	4	5	6	7	8	9	10	11	Final
Brent Pierce	1	0	1	0	0	1	0	1	1	0	0	5
Sean Geall	0	0	0	1	1	0	1	0	0	2	1	6

Sheet 2	1	2	3	4	5	6	7	8	9	10	Final
Ken McArdle	0	0	1	0	1	0	0	0	2	1	5
Deane Horning	0	2	0	1	0	0	2	1	0	0	6

Sheet 3	1	2	3	4	5	6	7	8	9	10	Final
Trevor Perepolkin	1	0	0	0	2	1	0	X	X	X	4
Tom Buchy	0	3	1	1	0	0	4	X	X	X	9

Sheet 4	1	2	3	4	5	6	7	8	9	10	Final
Mark Longworth	1	0	3	1	0	2	0	0	3	X	10
Dean Joanisse	0	3	0	0	1	0	1	1	0	X	6

Sheet 5	1	2	3	4	5	6	7	8	9	10	Final
Neil Dangerfield	1	1	0	3	0	1	0	2	1	0	9
Andrew Bilesky	0	0	4	0	2	0	1	0	0	3	10

=== Draw 5 ===
Thursday, February 7, 2:00 pm

Sheet 1	1	2	3	4	5	6	7	8	9	10	Final
Mark Longworth	0	0	2	0	1	0	2	0	2	2	9
Jason Montgomery	1	1	0	1	0	1	0	1	0	0	5

Sheet 2	1	2	3	4	5	6	7	8	9	10	Final
Richard Brower	0	0	0	3	1	0	1	0	2	1	8
Jay Tuson	1	0	0	0	0	1	0	3	0	0	5

Sheet 3	1	2	3	4	5	6	7	8	9	10	Final
Jim Cotter	3	0	1	2	X	X	X	X	X	X	6
Jay Wakefield	0	1	0	0	X	X	X	X	X	X	1

Sheet 4	1	2	3	4	5	6	7	8	9	10	Final
Ken McArdle	1	1	0	0	1	0	0	X	X	X	3
Trevor Perepolkin	0	0	2	1	0	3	3	X	X	X	9

Sheet 5	1	2	3	4	5	6	7	8	9	10	Final
Brent Yamada	1	0	0	0	1	0	1	0	2	0	5
Dean Joanisse	0	0	0	2	0	1	0	2	0	1	6

=== Draw 6 ===
Thursday, February 7, 7:00 pm

Sheet 1	1	2	3	4	5	6	7	8	9	10	Final
Neil Dangerfield	0	2	0	2	0	2	0	1	0	1	8
Tom Buchy	0	0	1	0	3	0	1	0	1	0	6

Sheet 2	1	2	3	4	5	6	7	8	9	10	Final
Mark Longworth	1	0	0	1	0	1	X	X	X	X	3
Jim Cotter	0	4	1	0	3	0	X	X	X	X	8

Sheet 3	1	2	3	4	5	6	7	8	9	10	Final
Andrew Bilesky	0	1	0	2	0	1	0	0	X	X	4
Sean Geall	1	0	1	0	3	0	0	4	X	X	9

Sheet 4	1	2	3	4	5	6	7	8	9	10	Final
Deane Horning	0	0	1	1	1	0	1	0	1	X	5
Brent Pierce	2	1	0	0	0	3	0	3	0	X	9

Sheet 5	1	2	3	4	5	6	7	8	9	10	Final
Jason Montgomery	1	1	0	0	2	0	0	0	0	0	4
Jay Wakefield	0	0	1	1	0	0	1	1	0	1	5

=== Draw 7 ===
Friday, February 8, 9:00 am

Sheet 1	1	2	3	4	5	6	7	8	9	10	Final
Dean Joanisse	0	1	0	0	1	0	X	X	X	X	2
Deane Horning	2	0	3	3	0	2	X	X	X	X	10

Sheet 2	1	2	3	4	5	6	7	8	9	10	Final
Neil Dangerfield	0	3	0	1	0	1	0	1	X	X	6
Brent Pierce	2	0	2	0	2	0	4	0	X	X	10

Sheet 3	1	2	3	4	5	6	7	8	9	10	Final
Richard Brower	0	0	1	0	0	3	0	0	0	X	4
Tom Buchy	0	2	0	0	2	0	1	1	4	X	10

Sheet 4	1	2	3	4	5	6	7	8	9	10	Final
Andrew Bilesky	2	1	0	1	1	0	0	1	0	1	7
Jim Cotter	0	0	1	0	0	0	2	0	1	0	4

Sheet 5	1	2	3	4	5	6	7	8	9	10	Final
Mark Longworth	0	0	0	0	1	0	1	0	2	1	5
Trevor Perepolkin	0	1	1	1	0	2	0	1	0	0	6

=== Draw 8 ===
Friday, February 8, 2:00 pm

Sheet 1	1	2	3	4	5	6	7	8	9	10	Final
Neil Dangerfield	1	0	0	1	0	0	2	1	0	X	5
Trevor Perepolkin	0	3	1	0	3	0	0	0	1	X	8

Sheet 2	1	2	3	4	5	6	7	8	9	10	Final
Jay Wakefield	1	0	1	0	0	0	1	1	0	1	5
Deane Horning	0	1	0	2	0	0	0	0	1	0	4

Sheet 3	1	2	3	4	5	6	7	8	9	10	Final
Brent Pierce	1	0	0	0	3	0	0	0	0	3	7
Andrew Bilesky	0	2	0	1	0	1	0	1	1	0	6

Sheet 5	1	2	3	4	5	6	7	8	9	10	Final
Jim Cotter	1	0	1	0	2	0	1	0	X	X	5
Tom Buchy	0	3	0	1	0	3	0	2	X	X	9

=== Draw 9 ===
Friday, February 8, 7:00 pm

Sheet 2	1	2	3	4	5	6	7	8	9	10	Final
Trevor Perepolkin	0	1	0	2	0	0	1	0	2	0	6
Tom Buchy	1	0	1	0	1	1	0	2	0	1	7

Sheet 4	1	2	3	4	5	6	7	8	9	10	Final
Jay Wakefield	0	2	0	2	0	1	1	0	1	1	8
Andrew Bilesky	1	0	4	0	3	0	0	1	0	0	9

== Playoffs ==
Page playoff system
1	Sean Geall	4
2	Brent Pierce	8
3	Tom Buchy	3
4	Andrew Bilesky	8

Semifinal
1	Sean Geall	4
4	Andrew Bilesky	7

Final
2	Brent Pierce	4
4	Andrew Bilesky	7

=== 1 vs. 2 ===
Saturday, February 9, 11:00 am

Sheet 1	1	2	3	4	5	6	7	8	9	10	Final
Sean Geall	1	0	0	1	0	1	1	0	X	X	4
Brent Pierce	0	1	1	0	4	0	0	2	X	X	8

Player percentages
Team Geall		Team Pierce	
Mark Olson	88%	Grant Dezura	92%
Sebastien Robillard	64%	Kevin Recksiedler	67%
Jay Peachey	68%	Jeff Richard	78%
Sean Geall	61%	Brent Pierce	85%
Total	70%	Total	80%

=== 3 vs. 4 ===
Saturday, February 9, 11:00 am

Sheet 2	1	2	3	4	5	6	7	8	9	10	Final
Tom Buchy	0	0	0	2	1	0	0	0	X	X	3
Andrew Bilesky	2	1	1	0	0	0	3	1	X	X	8

Player percentages
Team Buchy		Team Bilesky	
Darren Will	89%	Aaron Watson	92%
Dave Toffolo	82%	Derek Errington	88%
Dave Stephenson	76%	Steve Kopf	94%
Tom Buchy	65%	Andrew Bilesky	89%
Total	78%	Total	91%

=== Semifinal ===
Saturday, February 9, 7:30 pm

Sheet 2	1	2	3	4	5	6	7	8	9	10	Final
Sean Geall	1	0	0	1	0	0	1	1	0	X	4
Andrew Bilesky	0	4	0	0	0	1	0	0	2	X	7

Player percentages
Team Geall		Team Bilesky	
Mark Olson	90%	Aaron Watson	89%
Sebastien Robillard	80%	Derek Errington	74%
Jay Peachey	74%	Steve Kopf	81%
Sean Geall	81%	Andrew Bilesky	89%
Total	81%	Total	83%

=== Final ===
Sunday, February 10, 5:00 pm

Sheet 5	1	2	3	4	5	6	7	8	9	10	Final
Brent Pierce	0	0	0	1	0	0	2	0	1	0	4
Andrew Bilesky	0	1	2	0	1	1	0	1	0	1	7

Player percentages
Team Pierce		Team Bilesky	
Grant Dezura	91%	Aaron Watson	94%
Kevin Recksiedler	79%	Derek Errington	84%
Jeff Richard	73%	Steve Kopf	88%
Brent Pierce	74%	Andrew Bilesky	89%
Total	79%	Total	88%
