= 2013 Prestige Hotels & Resorts Curling Classic =

- Host city: Vernon, British Columbia
- Arena: Vernon Curling Club
- Dates: October 4–7
- Men's winner: (Alberta) Kevin Koe
- Curling club: Glencoe CC, Calgary
- Skip: Kevin Koe
- Third: Pat Simmons
- Second: Carter Rycroft
- Lead: Nolan Thiessen
- Finalist: (Washington (state)) Brady Clark
- Women's winner: (China) Wang Bingyu
- Curling club: Harbin CC, Harbin
- Skip: Wang Bingyu
- Third: Liu Yin
- Second: Yue Qingshuang
- Lead: Zhou Yan
- Finalist: (Switzerland) Mirjam Ott

The 2013 Prestige Hotels & Resorts Curling Classic was held from October 4 to 7 at the Vernon Curling Club in Vernon, British Columbia as part of the 2013–14 World Curling Tour. Both the men's and women's events was held in a triple-knockout format. The purse for the men's event was CAD$26,000, while the purse for the women's event was CAD$39,500.

== Men ==
=== Teams ===
The teams are listed as follows:

Skip	Third	Second	Lead	Locale
Tom Appelman	Nathan Connolly	Brandon Klassen	Parker Konschuh	Edmonton, Alberta
Andrew Bilesky	Stephen Kopf	Derek Errington	Aaron Watson	New Westminster, British Columbia
Brendan Bottcher	Micky Lizmore	Bradley Thiessen	Karrick Martin	Edmonton, Alberta
Brady Clark	Sean Beighton	Darren Lehto	Phil Tilker	(Washington (state)) Lynnwood, Washington
Jamie King	Blake MacDonald	Scott Pfeifer	Jeff Erickson	Edmonton, Alberta
Kevin Koe	Pat Simmons	Carter Rycroft	Nolan Thiessen	Calgary, Alberta
Liu Rui	Zang Jialiang	Xu Xiaoming	Ba Dexin	Harbin, China
Mark Longworth	Jamie Sexton	Hugh Bennett	Michael Longworth	Kelowna, British Columbia
Ken McArdle	Dylan Somerton	Chase Martyn	Michael Horita	Port Coquitlam, British Columbia
Yusuke Morozumi	Tsuyoshi Yamaguchi	Tetsuro Shimizu	Kosuke Morozumi	Karuizawa, Japan
Jim Cotter (fourth)	John Morris (skip)	Tyrel Griffith	Rick Sawatsky	Vernon, British Columbia
Trevor Perepolkin	Deane Horning	Tyler Orme	Chris Anderson	Vernon, British Columbia
Sean Geall (fourth)	Brent Pierce (skip)	Sebastien Robillard	Mark Olson	New Westminster, British Columbia
Jeff Richard	Tom Shypitka	Jay Wakefield	David Harper	Kelowna, British Columbia
Randie Shen	Brendon Liu	Nicolas Hsu	Justin Hsu	Taipei, Chinese Taipei
Brent Yamada	Corey Sauer	Tyler Klymchuk	Lance Yamada	Kamloops, British Columbia

=== Knockout results ===
The draw is listed as follows:

==== A event ====
First Knockout		Semifinals		Qualifier 1
(Alberta) Kevin Koe	9
(British Columbia) Ken McArdle	2	(Alberta) Kevin Koe	6
(British Columbia) Andrew Bilesky	6	(Washington (state)) Brady Clark	3
(Washington (state)) Brady Clark	7			(Alberta) Kevin Koe	6
(Alberta) Brendan Bottcher	9			(Alberta) Brendan Bottcher	4
(Chinese Taipei) Randie Shen	0	(Alberta) Brendan Bottcher	6
(British Columbia) Trevor Perepolkin	9	(British Columbia) Trevor Perepolkin	4
(Alberta) Jamie King	5

First Knockout		Semifinals		Qualifier 2
(British Columbia) John Morris	5
(British Columbia) Brent Yamada	2	(British Columbia) John Morris	7
(British Columbia) Jeff Richard	8	(British Columbia) Jeff Richard	5
(British Columbia) Brent Pierce	7			(British Columbia) John Morris	3
(China) Liu Rui	7			(Alberta) Tom Appelman	1
(British Columbia) Mark Longworth	1	(China) Liu Rui	4
(Alberta) Tom Appelman	5	(Alberta) Tom Appelman	10
(Japan) Yusuke Morozumi	3

==== B event ====
Second Knockout
(British Columbia) Ken McArdle	4
(British Columbia) Andrew Bilesky	5
(Chinese Taipei) Randie Shen	2
(Alberta) Jamie King	7

Quarterfinals
(China) Liu Rui	7
(British Columbia) Andrew Bilesky	2
(British Columbia) Jeff Richard	3
(Alberta) Jamie King	7

Semifinals
(China) Liu Rui	5
(Alberta) Jamie King	4

Qualifier 3
(China) Liu Rui	7
(Alberta) Tom Appelman	4

Second Knockout
(British Columbia) Brent Yamada	2
(British Columbia) Brent Pierce	6
(British Columbia) Mark Longworth	4
(Japan) Yusuke Morozumi	8

Quarterfinals
(British Columbia) Trevor Perepolkin	6
(British Columbia) Brent Pierce	5
(Washington (state)) Brady Clark	5
(Japan) Yusuke Morozumi	3

Semifinals
(British Columbia) Trevor Perepolkin	7
(Washington (state)) Brady Clark	1

Qualifier 4
(British Columbia) Trevor Perepolkin	5
(Alberta) Brendan Bottcher	4

=== C event ===
Third Knockout
(British Columbia) Ken McArdle	9
(Chinese Taipei) Randie Shen	5
(British Columbia) Brent Pierce	5
(Japan) Yusuke Morozumi	4

Semifinals
(British Columbia) Ken McArdle	3
(Washington (state)) Brady Clark	7
(British Columbia) Brent Pierce	4
(Alberta) Tom Appelman	5

Qualifier 5
(Washington (state)) Brady Clark	6
(Alberta) Tom Appelman	5

Third Knockout
(British Columbia) Brent Yamada	4
(British Columbia) Mark Longworth	7
(British Columbia) Andrew Bilesky	3
(British Columbia) Jeff Richard	5

Semifinals
(British Columbia) Mark Longworth	3
(Alberta) Jamie King	7
(British Columbia) Jeff Richard	6
(Alberta) Brendan Bottcher	5

Qualifier 6
(Alberta) Jamie King	6
(British Columbia) Jeff Richard	7

=== Playoffs ===
Quarterfinals
(China) Liu Rui	8
(British Columbia) Jeff Richard	7
(British Columbia) Trevor Perepolkin	4
(Washington (state)) Brady Clark	8

Semifinals
(Alberta) Kevin Koe	5
(China) Liu Rui	4
(British Columbia) John Morris	8
(Washington (state)) Brady Clark	9

Final
(Alberta) Kevin Koe	6
(Washington (state)) Brady Clark	5

== Women ==
=== Teams ===
The teams are listed as follows:

Skip	Third	Second	Lead	Locale
Cheryl Bernard	Susan O'Connor	Lori Olson-Johns	Shannon Aleksic	Calgary, Alberta
Laura Crocker	Erin Carmody	Rebecca Pattinson	Jen Gates	Edmonton, Alberta
Satsuki Fujisawa	Miyo Ichikawa	Emi Shimizu	Miyuki Satoh	Karuizawa, Japan
Kerry Galusha	Ashley Green	Megan Cormier	Wendy Miller	Yellowknife, Northwest Territories
Colleen Hannah	Simone Groundwater	Laura Ball	Cynthia Parton	Maple Ridge, British Columbia
Janet Harvey	Cherie-Ann Loder	Kristin Loder	Carey Kirby	Winnipeg, Manitoba
Amber Holland	Jolene Campbell	Dailene Sivertson	Brooklyn Lemon	Regina, Saskatchewan
Michèle Jäggi	Marisa Winkelhausen	Stéphanie Jäggi	Melanie Barbezat	Bern, Switzerland
Kim Ji-sun	Gim Un-chi	Shin Mi-sung	Lee Seul-bee	Gyeonggi-do, South Korea
Shannon Kleibrink	Bronwen Webster	Kalynn Park	Chelsey Matson	Calgary, Alberta
Patti Knezevic	Jen Rusnell	Kristen Fewster	Rhonda Camozzi	Prince George, British Columbia
Roberta Kuhn	Karla Thompson	Brooklyn Leitch	Michelle Ramsay	Kamloops, British Columbia
Kelley Law	Kirsten Fox	Kristen Recksiedler	Trysta Vandale	New Westminster, British Columbia
Stefanie Lawton	Sherry Anderson	Sherri Singler	Marliese Kasner	Saskatoon, Saskatchewan
Allison MacInnes	Grace MacInnes	Diane Gushulak	Amanda Tipper	Kamloops, British Columbia
Marla Mallett	Kelly Shimizu	Adina Tasaka	Shannon Ward	Cloverdale, British Columbia
Eve Muirhead	Anna Sloan	Vicki Adams	Claire Hamilton	Stirling, Scotland
Heather Nedohin	Beth Iskiw	Jessica Mair	Laine Peters	Edmonton, Alberta
Amy Nixon	Nadine Chyz	Whitney Eckstrand	Heather Rogers	Calgary, Alberta
Ayumi Ogasawara	Yumie Funayama	Kaho Onodera	Chinami Yoshida	Sapporo, Japan
Mirjam Ott	Carmen Schäfer	Carmen Küng	Janine Greiner	Davos, Switzerland
Cassie Potter	Jamie Haskell	Jackie Lemke	Steph Sambor	St. Paul, Minnesota
Allison Pottinger	Nicole Joraanstad	Natalie Nicholson	Tabitha Peterson	Bemidji, Minnesota
Darcy Robertson	Tracey Lavery	Vanessa Foster	Michelle Kruk	Elora, Ontario
Kelly Scott	Jeanna Schraeder	Sasha Carter	Sarah Wazney	Kelowna, British Columbia
Anna Sidorova	Liudmila Privivkova	Margarita Fomina	Ekaterina Galkina	Moscow, Russia
Renée Sonnenberg	Lawnie McDonald	Cary-Anne McTaggart	Rona Pasika	Grande Prairie, Alberta
Barb Spencer	Katie Spencer	Ainsley Champagne	Raunora Westcott	Winnipeg, Manitoba
Valerie Sweeting	Dana Ferguson	Joanne Taylor	Rachelle Pidherny	Edmonton, Alberta
Jill Thurston	Brette Richards	Brandi Oliver	Blaine de Jager	Winnipeg, Manitoba
Wang Bingyu	Liu Yin	Yue Qingshuang	Zhou Yan	Harbin, China
Crystal Webster	Cathy Overton-Clapham	Geri-Lynn Ramsay	Samantha Preston	Calgary, Alberta

=== Knockout results ===
The draw is listed as follows:

==== A event ====
First Knockout
(Saskatchewan) Stefanie Lawton	6
(British Columbia) Allison MacInnes	3
(Japan) Satsuki Fujisawa	4
(Manitoba) Barb Spencer	5
(Alberta) Cheryl Bernard	4
(Minnesota) Cassie Potter	5
(Alberta) Laura Crocker	8
(Northwest Territories) Kerry Galusha	3
(Alberta) Heather Nedohin	3
(British Columbia) Kelley Law	2
(British Columbia) Kelly Scott	3
(Japan) Ayumi Ogasawara	5
(Alberta) Valerie Sweeting	7
(Ontario) Darcy Robertson	4
(Alberta) Shannon Kleibrink	3
(South Korea) Kim Ji-sun	5

Quarterfinals
(Saskatchewan) Stefanie Lawton	9
(Manitoba) Barb Spencer	5
(Minnesota) Cassie Potter	4
(Alberta) Laura Crocker	3
(Alberta) Heather Nedohin	6
(Japan) Ayumi Ogasawara	5
(Alberta) Valerie Sweeting	4
(South Korea) Kim Ji-sun	5

Semifinals
(Saskatchewan) Stefanie Lawton	8
(Minnesota) Cassie Potter	1
(Alberta) Heather Nedohin	4
(South Korea) Kim Ji-sun	3

Qualifier 1
(Saskatchewan) Stefanie Lawton	6
(Alberta) Heather Nedohin	5

First Knockout
(Scotland) Eve Muirhead	5
(British Columbia) Roberta Kuhn	3
(China) Wang Bingyu	9
(Minnesota) Allison Pottinger	4
(Switzerland) Michèle Jäggi	6
(Manitoba) Janet Harvey	3
(Alberta) Renée Sonnenberg	6
(British Columbia) Marla Mallett	7
(Russia) Anna Sidorova	5
(British Columbia) Colleen Hannah	4
(Alberta) Crystal Webster	6
(Alberta) Amy Nixon	7
(Saskatchewan) Amber Holland	8
(Ontario) Jill Thurston	3
(Switzerland) Mirjam Ott	8
(British Columbia) Patti Knezevic	3

Quarterfinals
(Scotland) Eve Muirhead	4
(China) Wang Bingyu	8
(Switzerland) Michèle Jäggi	4
(British Columbia) Marla Mallett	5
(Russia) Anna Sidorova	5
(Alberta) Amy Nixon	6
(Saskatchewan) Amber Holland	4
(Switzerland) Mirjam Ott	8'

Semifinals
(China) Wang Bingyu	8
(British Columbia) Marla Mallett	3
(Alberta) Amy Nixon	8
(Switzerland) Mirjam Ott	5

Qualifier 2
(China) Wang Bingyu	6
(Alberta) Amy Nixon	5

==== B event ====
Second Knockout
(British Columbia) Allison MacInnes	6
(Japan) Satsuki Fujisawa	8
(Alberta) Cheryl Bernard	6
(Northwest Territories) Kerry Galusha	3

Quarterfinals
(Japan) Ayumi Ogasawara	7
(Japan) Satsuki Fujisawa	3
(Alberta) Valerie Sweeting	2
(Alberta) Cheryl Bernard	3

Semifinals
(Japan) Ayumi Ogasawara	6
(British Columbia) Marla Mallett	2
(Alberta) Cheryl Bernard	5
(Switzerland) Mirjam Ott	8

To Qualifier 3
(Japan) Ayumi Ogasawara	0
(Switzerland) Mirjam Ott	7
Qualifier 3
(Switzerland) Mirjam Ott	8
(British Columbia) Kelly Scott	2

Second Knockout
(British Columbia) Kelley Law	2
(British Columbia) Kelly Scott	5
(Ontario) Darcy Robertson	3
(Alberta) Shannon Kleibrink	8

Quarterfinals
(Manitoba) Barb Spencer	5
(British Columbia) Kelly Scott	7
(Alberta) Laura Crocker	5
(Alberta) Shannon Kleibrink	4

Semifinals
(British Columbia) Kelly Scott	5
(Alberta) Laura Crocker	4

To Qualifier 3
(British Columbia) Kelly Scott	5
(Alberta) Heather Nedohin	4

Second Knockout
(British Columbia) Roberta Kuhn	7
(Minnesota) Allison Pottinger	5
(Manitoba) Janet Harvey	0
(Alberta) Renée Sonnenberg	5

Quarterfinals
(Russia) Anna Sidorova	6
(British Columbia) Roberta Kuhn	2
(Saskatchewan) Amber Holland	2
(Alberta) Renée Sonnenberg	6

Semifinals
(Russia) Anna Sidorova	6
(Minnesota) Cassie Potter	1
(Alberta) Renée Sonnenberg	8
(South Korea) Kim Ji-sun	5

To Qualifier 4
(Russia) Anna Sidorova	5
(Alberta) Renée Sonnenberg	6
Qualifier 4
(Alberta) Renée Sonnenberg	6
(Switzerland) Michèle Jäggi	3

Second Knockout
(British Columbia) Colleen Hannah	2
(Alberta) Crystal Webster	8
(Ontario) Jill Thurston	2
(British Columbia) Patti Knezevic	7

Quarterfinals
(Scotland) Eve Muirhead	6
(Alberta) Crystal Webster	8
(Switzerland) Michèle Jäggi	9
(British Columbia) Patti Knezevic	3

Semifinals
(Alberta) Crystal Webster	3
(Switzerland) Michèle Jäggi	7

To Qualifier 4
(Switzerland) Michèle Jäggi	7
(Alberta) Amy Nixon	5

==== C event ====
Third Knockout
(British Columbia) Allison MacInnes	7
(Northwest Territories) Kerry Galusha	5
(British Columbia) Roberta Kuhn	3
(Saskatchewan) Amber Holland	7

Quarterfinals
(Minnesota) Cassie Potter	3
(British Columbia) Allison MacInnes	7
(Alberta) Crystal Webster	7
(Saskatchewan) Amber Holland	6

Semifinals
(British Columbia) Allison MacInnes	6
(Alberta) Crystal Webster	4

Qualifier 5
(British Columbia) Allison MacInnes	5
(British Columbia) Kelly Scott	7

Third Knockout
(British Columbia) Kelley Law	4
(Ontario) Darcy Robertson	6

Quarterfinals
(Scotland) Eve Muirhead	7
(British Columbia) Patti Knezevic	6
(South Korea) Kim Ji-sun	5
(Ontario) Darcy Robertson	7

Semifinals
(Scotland) Eve Muirhead	6
(Alberta) Heather Nedohin	5
(Ontario) Darcy Robertson	1
(Japan) Ayumi Ogasawara	7

Qualifier 6
(Scotland) Eve Muirhead	8
(Japan) Ayumi Ogasawara	7

Third Knockout
(Minnesota) Allison Pottinger	6
(Manitoba) Janet Harvey	2

Quarterfinals
(Alberta) Cheryl Bernard	5
(Minnesota) Allison Pottinger	6
(Manitoba) Barb Spencer	7
(Alberta) Shannon Kleibrink	3

Semifinals
(Minnesota) Allison Pottinger	9
(Alberta) Amy Nixon	5
(Manitoba) Barb Spencer	5
(Russia) Anna Sidorova	7

Qualifier 7
(Minnesota) Allison Pottinger	10
(Russia) Anna Sidorova	5

Third Knockout
(Japan) Satsuki Fujisawa	4
(Alberta) Valerie Sweeting	8
(British Columbia) Colleen Hannah	2
(Ontario) Jill Thurston	7

Quarterfinals
(Alberta) Laura Crocker	2
(Alberta) Valerie Sweeting	6
(British Columbia) Marla Mallett	4
(Ontario) Jill Thurston	5

Semifinals
(Alberta) Valerie Sweeting	6
(Ontario) Jill Thurston	2

Qualifier 8
(Alberta) Valerie Sweeting	6
(Switzerland) Michèle Jäggi	8

=== Playoffs ===
Quarterfinals
(Saskatchewan) Stefanie Lawton	7
(Minnesota) Allison Pottinger	4
(Switzerland) Mirjam Ott	7
(British Columbia) Kelly Scott	6
(China) Wang Bingyu	7
(Scotland) Eve Muirhead	3
(Alberta) Renée Sonnenberg	5
(Switzerland) Michèle Jäggi	8

Semifinals
(Saskatchewan) Stefanie Lawton	4
(Switzerland) Mirjam Ott	5
(China) Wang Bingyu	6
(Switzerland) Michèle Jäggi	5

Final
(Switzerland) Mirjam Ott	4
(China) Wang Bingyu	5
