= 2012 Prestige Hotels & Resorts Curling Classic =

- Host city: Vernon, British Columbia
- Arena: Vernon Curling Club
- Dates: September 27 – October 1
- Men's winner: (British Columbia) Jim Cotter
- Curling club: Vernon Curling Club, Vernon
- Skip: Jim Cotter
- Third: Jason Gunnlaugson
- Second: Tyrel Griffith
- Lead: Rick Sawatsky
- Finalist: (Alberta) Jamie King
- Women's winner: (Alberta) Heather Nedohin
- Curling club: Saville Sports Centre, Edmonton
- Skip: Heather Nedohin
- Third: Beth Iskiw
- Second: Jessica Mair
- Lead: Laine Peters
- Finalist: (Russia) Anna Sidorova

The 2012 Prestige Hotels & Resorts Curling Classic was held from September 27 to October 1 at the Vernon Curling Club in Vernon, British Columbia as part of the 2012–13 World Curling Tour. The women's event, was held in a round robin format, and the men's event, held in a triple-knockout format. The purses for the men's and women's were CAD$26,000 and CAD $35,000, respectively.

== Men ==
=== Teams ===
Skip	Third	Second	Lead	Locale
Steve Birklid	Chris Bond	Matt Birklid	Atticus Wallace	(Washington (state)) Seattle, Washington
Andrew Bilesky	Stephen Kopf	Derek Errington	Aaron Watson	Vancouver, British Columbia
Matthew Blandford	Evan Asmussen	Brent Hamilton	Brad Chyz	Calgary, Alberta
Jim Cotter	Jason Gunnlaugson	Tyrel Griffith	Rick Sawatsky	Kelowna/Vernon, British Columbia
Pete Fenson	Shawn Rojeski	Joe Polo	Ryan Brunt	Bemidji, Minnesota
Sean Geall	Jay Peachey	Sebastien Robillard	Mark Olson	New Westminster, British Columbia
Deane Horning	Brad Wood	Rob Nobert	Don Freschi	Vernon, British Columbia
Kim Chang-min	Kim Min-chan	Sung Se-hyun	Seo Young-seon	Gyeongbuk, South Korea
Jamie King	Blake MacDonald	Scott Pfeifer	Jeff Erickson	Edmonton, Alberta
Ken McArdle	Jared Bowles	Dylan Somerton	Michael Horita	New Westminster, British Columbia
Yusuke Morozumi	Tsuyoshi Yamaguchi	Tetsuro Shimizu	Kosuke Morozumi	Karuizawa, Japan
Trevor Perepolkin	Tyler Orme	James Mackenzie	Chris Anderson	Vernon, British Columbia
Dan Petryk (fourth)	Steve Petryk (skip)	Roland Robinson	Thomas Usselman	Calgary, Alberta
Brent Pierce	Jeff Richard	Kevin Recksiedler	Grant Dezura	New Westminster, British Columbia
Michael Johnson (fourth)	Paul Cseke	Jay Wakefield (skip)	John Cullen	New Westminster, British Columbia
Brent Yamada	Corey Sauer	Doug Murdoch	Lance Yamada	Vernon, British Columbia

=== Knockout results ===
==== A event ====
First Knockout		Semifinals		Qualifier 1
(Alberta) Steve Petryk	7
(Washington (state)) Steve Birklid	6	(Alberta) Steve Petryk	9
(Japan) Yusuke Morozumi	7	(Japan) Yusuke Morozumi	5
(British Columbia) Brent Yamada	6			(Alberta) Steve Petryk	W
(British Columbia) Trevor Perepolkin	4			(British Columbia) Brent Pierce	L
(British Columbia) Andrew Bilesky	5	(British Columbia) Andrew Bilesky	3
(British Columbia) Brent Pierce	6	(British Columbia) Brent Pierce	5
(South Korea) Kim Chang-min	3

First Knockout		Semifinals		Qualifier 2
(British Columbia) Jim Cotter	5
(Alberta) Matthew Blanford	6	(Alberta) Matthew Blanford	7
(British Columbia) Jay Wakefield	9	(British Columbia) Jay Wakefield	8
(British Columbia) Sean Geall	4			(British Columbia) Jay Wakefield	7
(Alberta) Jamie King	6			(Alberta) Jamie King	5
(British Columbia) Ken McArdle	1	(Alberta) Jamie King	7
(Minnesota) Pete Fenson	5	(Minnesota) Pete Fenson	5
(British Columbia) Deane Horning	4

==== B event ====
Second Knockout
(Washington (state)) Steve Birklid	0
(British Columbia) Brent Yamada	7
(British Columbia) Trevor Perepolkin	6
(South Korea) Kim Chang-min	7

Quarterfinals
(Minnesota) Pete Fenson	6
(British Columbia) Brent Yamada	3
(Alberta) Matthew Blanford	3
(South Korea) Kim Chang-min	7

Semifinals
(Minnesota) Pete Fenson	7
(South Korea) Kim Chang-min	4

Qualifier 3
(Minnesota) Pete Fenson	9
(Alberta) Jamie King	4

Second Knockout
(British Columbia) Jim Cotter	5
(British Columbia) Sean Geall	6
(British Columbia) Ken McArdle	7
(British Columbia) Deane Horning	3

Quarterfinals
(British Columbia) Andrew Bilesky	4
(British Columbia) Sean Geall	9
(Japan) Yusuke Morozumi	4
(British Columbia) Ken McArdle	5

Semifinals
(British Columbia) Sean Geall	5
(British Columbia) Ken McArdle	2

Qualifier 4
(British Columbia) Sean Geall	7
(British Columbia) Brent Pierce	3

==== C event ====
Third Knockout
(Washington (state)) Steve Birklid	0
(British Columbia) Trevor Perepolkin	7
(British Columbia) Andrew Bilesky	3
(Japan) Yusuke Morozumi	8

Semifinals
(British Columbia) Trevor Perepolkin	7
(British Columbia) Ken McArdle	2
(Japan) Yusuke Morozumi	6
(Alberta) Jamie King	7

Qualifier 5
(British Columbia) Trevor Perepolkin	4
(Alberta) Jamie King	7

Third Knockout
(British Columbia) Jim Cotter	8
(British Columbia) Deane Horning	4
(British Columbia) Brent Yamada	6
(Alberta) Matthew Blandford	5

Semifinals
(British Columbia) Jim Cotter	7
(South Korea) Kim Chang-min	6
(British Columbia) Brent Yamada	2
(British Columbia) Brent Pierce	8

Qualifier 6
(British Columbia) Jim Cotter	7
(British Columbia) Brent Pierce	3

=== Playoffs ===
Quarterfinals
(Minnesota) Pete Fenson	2
(British Columbia) Jim Cotter	6
(British Columbia) Sean Geall	4
(Alberta) Jamie King	5

Semifinals
(Alberta) Steve Petryk	3
(British Columbia) Jim Cotter	6
(British Columbia) Jay Wakefield	2
(Alberta) Jamie King	6

Final
(British Columbia) Jim Cotter	7
(Alberta) Jamie King	3

== Women ==
=== Teams ===
Skip	Third	Second	Lead	Locale
Cheryl Bernard	Susan O'Connor	Lori Olson-Johns	Shannon Aleksic	Calgary, Alberta
Chelsea Carey	Kristy McDonald	Kristen Foster	Lindsay Titheridge	Winnipeg, Manitoba
Laura Crocker	Sarah Wilkes	Rebecca Pattison	Jenn Gates	Edmonton, Alberta
Lisa Eyamie	Maria Bushell	Jodi Marthaller	Valerie Hamende	High River, Alberta
Satsuki Fujisawa	Miyo Ichikawa	Emi Shimizu	Miyuki Satoh	Karuizawa, Japan
Amber Holland	Jolene Campbell	Brooklyn Lemon	Dailene Sivertson	Regina, Saskatchewan
Michèle Jäggi	Marisa Winkelhausen	Stéphanie Jäggi	Melanie Barbezat	Bern, Switzerland
Penny Schantz (fourth)	Sandra Jenkins (skip)	Kate Horne	Sherry Heath	Vernon, British Columbia
Heather Jensen	Shana Snell	Heather Rogers	Carly Quigley	Airdrie, Alberta
Jiang Yilun	Yu Xinna	Liu Jinli	Liu Sijia	Harbin, China
Jessie Kaufman	Nicky Kaufman	Kelly Erickson	Cori Morris	Edmonton, Alberta
Kim Eun-jung	Kim Gyeong-ae	Kim Seon-yeong	Kim Yeong-mi	South Korea
Shannon Kleibrink	Bronwen Webster	Kalynn Park	Chelsey Matson	Calgary, Alberta
Roberta Kuhn	Karla Thompson	Michelle Ramsay	Christen Wilson	Vernon, British Columbia
Allison MacInnes	Grace MacInnes	Diane Gushulak	Amanda Brennan	Kamloops, British Columbia
Marla Mallett	Kelly Shimizu	Shannon Ward	Barb Zbeetnoff	Cloverdale, British Columbia
Kristie Moore	Blaine Richards	Michelle Dykstra	Amber Cheveldave	Grande Prairie, Alberta
Heather Nedohin	Beth Iskiw	Jessica Mair	Laine Peters	Edmonton, Alberta
Ayumi Ogasawara	Yumie Funayama	Kaho Onodera	Michiko Tomabechi	Sapporo, Japan
Mirjam Ott	Carmen Schäfer	Carmen Küng	Janine Greiner	Davos, Switzerland
Cathy Overton-Clapham	Jenna Loder	Ashley Howard	Breanne Meakin	Winnipeg, Manitoba
Marilou Richter	Darah Provencal	Jessie Sanderson	Sandra Comadina	New Westminster, British Columbia
Kristen Fewster (fourth)	Jennifer Rusnell (skip)	Patti Knezevic	Rhonda Camozzi	Kamloops, British Columbia
Jennifer Schab	Sheri Pickering	Jody Kiem	Heather Hansen	Calgary, Alberta
Kelly Scott	Jeanna Schraeder	Sasha Carter	Sarah Wazney	Kelowna, British Columbia
Anna Sidorova	Liudmila Privivkova	Margarita Fomina	Ekaterina Galkina	Moscow, Russia
Renée Sonnenberg	Lawnie MacDonald	Cary-Anne Sallows	Rona Pasika	Edmonton, Alberta
Valerie Sweeting	Dana Ferguson	Joanne Taylor	Rachelle Pidherny	Edmonton, Alberta
Kelly Thompson	Susan Hicks	Lisa Robitaille	Kimberly Hall	Vernon, British Columbia
Jill Thurston	Kristen Phillips	Brette Richards	Kendra Georges	Winnipeg, Manitoba
Wang Bingyu	Liu Yin	Yue Qingshuang	Zhou Yan	Harbin, China
Crystal Webster	Erin Carmody	Geri-Lynn Ramsay	Samantha Preston	Calgary, Alberta

=== Knockout brackets ===
==== A event ====
First Knockout
(Alberta) Heather Nedohin	8
(British Columbia) Sandra Jenkins	2
(Alberta) Laura Crocker	8
(Alberta) Kristie Moore	9
(Switzerland) Michèle Jäggi	6
(British Columbia) Roberta Kuhn	5
(Russia) Anna Sidorova	4
(Japan) Ayumi Ogasawara	3
(Manitoba) Chelsea Carey	5
(Alberta) Jennifer Schab	2
(British Columbia) Kelly Scott	11
(Alberta) Lisa Eyamie	4
(Alberta) Valerie Sweeting	5
(Japan) Satsuki Fujisawa	6
(Alberta) Crystal Webster	9
(China) Jiang Yilun	3

Quarterfinals
(Alberta) Heather Nedohin	6
(Alberta) Kristie Moore	8
(Switzerland) Michèle Jäggi	3
(Russia) Anna Sidorova	10
(Manitoba) Chelsea Carey	4
(British Columbia) Kelly Scott	6
(Japan) Satsuki Fujisawa	6
(Alberta) Crystal Webster	5

Semifinals
(Alberta) Kristie Moore	3
(Russia) Anna Sidorova	7
(British Columbia) Kelly Scott	7
(Japan) Satsuki Fujisawa	3

Qualifier 1
(Russia) Anna Sidorova	8
(British Columbia) Kelly Scott	2

First Knockout
(Manitoba) Cathy Overton-Clapham	5
(British Columbia) Marilou Richter	2
(Alberta) Jessie Kaufman	7
(British Columbia) Marla Mallett	6
(China) Wang Bingyu	6
(South Korea) Kim Eun-jung	5
(Alberta) Cheryl Bernard	7
(British Columbia) Jen Rusnell	4
(Switzerland) Mirjam Ott	11
(British Columbia) Kelly Thompson	1
(Saskatchewan) Amber Holland	5
(Manitoba) Jill Thurston	6
(Alberta) Shannon Kleibrink	6
(British Columbia) Allison MacInnes	3
(Alberta) Renée Sonnenberg	6
(Alberta) Heather Jensen	3

Quarterfinals
(Manitoba) Cathy Overton-Clapham	4
(Alberta) Jessie Kaufman	9
(China) Wang Bingyu	4
(Alberta) Cheryl Bernard	5
(Switzerland) Mirjam Ott	7
(Manitoba) Jill Thurston	2
(Alberta) Shannon Kleibrink	6
(Alberta) Renée Sonnenberg	2

Semifinals
(Alberta) Jessie Kaufman	4
(Alberta) Cheryl Bernard	5
(Switzerland) Mirjam Ott	4
(Alberta) Shannon Kleibrink	3

Qualifier 2
(Alberta) Cheryl Bernard	6
(Switzerland) Mirjam Ott	7

==== B event ====
Second Knockout
(British Columbia) Sandra Jenkins	3
(Alberta) Laura Crocker	9
(British Columbia) Roberta Kuhn	4
(Japan) Ayumi Ogasawara	5

Quarterfinals
(Manitoba) Chelsea Carey	6
(Alberta) Laura Crocker	5
(Alberta) Crystal Webster	5
(Japan) Ayumi Ogasawara	3

Semifinals
(Alberta) Jessie Kaufman	4
(Manitoba) Chelsea Carey	3
(Alberta) Shannon Kleibrink	9
(Alberta) Crystal Webster	6

To Qualifier 3
(Alberta) Jessie Kaufman	4
(Alberta) Shannon Kleibrink	5

Second Knockout
(Alberta) Jennifer Schab	6
(Alberta) Lisa Eyamie	5
(Alberta) Valerie Sweeting	7
(China) Jiang Yilun	1

Quarterfinals
(Alberta) Heather Nedohin	8
(Alberta) Jennifer Schab	2
(Switzerland) Michèle Jäggi	5
(Alberta) Valerie Sweeting	11

Semifinals
(Alberta) Heather Nedohin	4
(Alberta) Valerie Sweeting	6

To Qualifier 3
(Alberta) Valerie Sweeting	6
(British Columbia) Kelly Scott	4
Qualifier 3
(Alberta) Shannon Kleibrink	5
(Alberta) Valerie Sweeting	6

Second Knockout
(British Columbia) Marilou Richter	4
(British Columbia) Marla Mallett	7
(South Korea) Kim Eun-jung	8
(British Columbia) Jen Rusnell	3

Quarterfinals
(Manitoba) Jill Thurston	7
(British Columbia) Marla Mallett	0
(Alberta) Renée Sonnenberg	7
(South Korea) Kim Eun-jung	5

Semifinals
(Alberta) Kristie Moore	7
(Manitoba) Jill Thurston	4
(Japan) Satsuki Fujisawa	7
(Alberta) Renée Sonnenberg	4

To Qualifier 4
(Alberta) Kristie Moore	3
(Japan) Satsuki Fujisawa	5

Second Knockout
(British Columbia) Kelly Thompson	3
(Saskatchewan) Amber Holland	9
(British Columbia) Allison MacInnes	9
(Alberta) Heather Jensen	8

Quarterfinals
(Manitoba) Cathy Overton-Clapham	7
(Saskatchewan) Amber Holland	5
(China) Wang Bingyu	7
(British Columbia) Allison MacInnes	1

Semifinals
(Manitoba) Cathy Overton-Clapham	8
(China) Wang Bingyu	3

To Qualifier 4
(Manitoba) Cathy Overton-Clapham	7
(Alberta) Cheryl Bernard	2
Qualifier 4
(Japan) Satsuki Fujisawa	6
(Manitoba) Cathy Overton-Clapham	4

==== C event ====
Third Knockout
(British Columbia) Sandra Jenkins	7
(British Columbia) Roberta Kuhn	6
(British Columbia) Marla Mallett	8
(South Korea) Kim Eun-jung	4

Quarterfinals
(Manitoba) Jill Thurston	9
(British Columbia) Sandra Jenkins	2
(China) Wang Bingyu	8
(British Columbia) Marla Mallett	2

Semifinals
(Manitoba) Jill Thurston	7
(China) Wang Bingyu	3

Qualifier 5
(Alberta) Shannon Kleibrink	7
(Manitoba) Jill Thurston	1

Third Knockout
(Alberta) Lisa Eyamie	6
(China) Jiang Yilun	9

Quarterfinals
(Saskatchewan) Amber Holland	6
(British Columbia) Allison MacInnes	9
(Alberta) Renée Sonnenberg	4
(China) Jiang Yilun	2

Semifinals
(British Columbia) Kelly Scott	6
(British Columbia) Allison MacInnes	3
(Alberta) Jessie Kaufman	5
(Alberta) Renée Sonnenberg	7

Qualifier 6
(British Columbia) Kelly Scott	4
(Alberta) Renée Sonnenberg	9

Third Knockout
(British Columbia) Marilou Richter	7
(British Columbia) Jen Rusnell	0

Quarterfinals
(Alberta) Crystal Webster	8
(British Columbia) Marilou Richter	0
(Alberta) Jennifer Schab	3
(Switzerland) Michèle Jäggi	10

Semifinals
(Alberta) Cheryl Bernard	3
(Alberta) Crystal Webster	4
(Alberta) Kristie Moore	5
(Switzerland) Michèle Jäggi	7

Qualifier 7
(Alberta) Crystal Webster	4
(Switzerland) Michèle Jäggi	3

Third Knockout
(Alberta) Laura Crocker	6
(Japan) Ayumi Ogasawara	7
(British Columbia) Kelly Thompson	3
(Alberta) Heather Jensen	10

Quarterfinals
(Alberta) Heather Nedohin	7
(Japan) Ayumi Ogasawara	4
(Manitoba) Chelsea Carey	7
(Alberta) Heather Jensen	3

Semifinals
(Alberta) Heather Nedohin	6
(Manitoba) Chelsea Carey	5

Qualifier 8
(Alberta) Heather Nedohin	7
(Manitoba) Cathy Overton-Clapham	1

=== Playoffs ===
Quarterfinals
(Russia) Anna Sidorova	8
(Alberta) Crystal Webster	2
(Japan) Satsuki Fujisawa	2
(Alberta) Shannon Kleibrink	8
(Switzerland) Mirjam Ott	5
(Alberta) Renée Sonnenberg	7
(Alberta) Valerie Sweeting	1
(Alberta) Heather Nedohin	7

Semifinals
(Russia) Anna Sidorova	6
(Alberta) Shannon Kleibrink	4
(Alberta) Renée Sonnenberg	4
(Alberta) Heather Nedohin	6

Finals
(Russia) Anna Sidorova	2
(Alberta) Heather Nedohin	8
