= 2012 Canadian Direct Insurance BC Men's Curling Championship =

Canada new update on the men's curling championship

- Host city: Parksville, British Columbia
- Arena: Parksville Curling Club
- Dates: February 8–12
- Winner: Jim Cotter
- Curling club: Kelowna CC, Kelowna, BC
- Skip: Jim Cotter
- Third: Kevin Folk
- Second: Tyrel Griffith
- Lead: Rick Sawatsky
- Finalist: Brent Pierce

The 2012 Canadian Direct Insurance BC Men's Curling Championship (British Columbia's men's provincial curling championship) was held from February 8 to 12 at the Parksville Curling Club in Parksville, British Columbia. The winning team of Jim Cotter, represented British Columbia at the 2012 Tim Hortons Brier in Saskatoon, Saskatchewan.

== Changes to championship format ==
For the 2011–12 season, the British Columbia Curling Association made changes to the men's championship format. The tournament will be held in a triple knockout format with sixteen teams, and the qualifiers will play in a four team page playoff. This will allow an additional six teams to compete, compared to the ten team round-robin system used in the 2010–11 season. Teams will qualify for the championship through the following berth allocations:

- Defending Champion
- Top C.T.R.S Men's Team as of December 1, 2011
- 4 Qualifications from Open Event Qualification #1
- 4 Qualifications from Open Event Qualification #2
- 3 Qualifications from Open Event Qualification #3
- 3 Qualifications from Open Event Qualification #4

== Teams ==
Skip	Third	Second	Lead	Club(s)
Chris Baier	Mike Johnson	Jay Wakefield	John Cullen	Royal City Curling Club, New Westminster
Tom Buchy	Ken McHargue	Dave Toffolo	Darren Will	Kimberley Curling Club, Kimberley
Jim Cotter	Kevin Folk	Tyrel Griffith	Rick Sawatsky	Kelowna Curling Club, Kelowna, British Columbia
Neil Dangerfield	Denis Sutton	Darren Boden	Glen Allen	Victoria Curling Club, Victoria
Wylie Eden	Sean Matheson	Kurt Roberts	Tyler Jaeger	Penticton Curling Club, Penticton
Jody Epp	Blair Cusack	James York	Brad Kocurek	Victoria Curling Club, Victoria
Sean Geall	Ken Maskiewich	Bill Fisher	Mark Olson	Delta Thistle Curling Club, Delta
Darren Heath	Dave Belway	Darin Laface	Darryl Houston	Vernon Curling Club, Vernon
Ken McArdle	Doug Wilcock	Jared Bowles	Kyle Jackson	Royal City Curling Club, New Westminster
Jay Peachey	Ron Leech	Bryan Kedziora	Dwayne Uyede	Royal City Curling Club, New Westminster
Brent Pierce	Jeff Richard	Kevin Recksiedler	Grant Dezura	Royal City Curling Club, New Westminster
Tom Shypitka	Josh Firman	Steve Tersmette	Greg Terrill	Creston Curling Club, Creston
Jay Tuson	Ken Tucker	Glen Jackson	Colin Mantic	Victoria Curling Club, Victoria
Ron Vanderstar	Wade Eberle	Lyle Hensrud	Len Vanderstar	Smithers Curling Club, Smithers
Steve Waatainen	Kevin Weinreich	Sean Krepps	Keith Clarke	Nanaimo Curling Club, Nanaimo
Brian Windsor	Brad Thompson	Mike Smith	Adam Windsor	Kamloops Curling Club, Kamloops

== Results ==
=== A Event ===
First Knockout
Jim Cotter	4
Jay Peachey	8
Ron Vanderstar	2
Chris Baier	5
Steve Waatainen	10
Tom Shypitka	5
Brian Windsor	4
Jay Tuson	5
Neil Dangerfield	5
Sean Geall	7
Ken McArdle	7
Darren Heath	2
Tom Buchy	6
Jody Epp	5
Wylie Eden	3
Brent Pierce	9

Quarterfinals
Jay Peachey	3
Chris Baier	4
Steve Waatainen	3
Jay Tuson	8
Sean Geall	6
Ken McArdle	7
Tom Buchy	7
Brent Pierce	8

Semifinals
Chris Baier	2
Jay Tuson	5
Ken McArdle	5
Brent Pierce	8

Qualifier A
Jay Tuson	6
Brent Pierce	12

=== B Event ===
Second Knockout
Jim Cotter	6
Ron Vanderstar	4
Neil Dangerfield	3
Darren Heath	8

Quarterfinals
Jim Cotter	9
Steve Waatainen	4
Darren Heath	10
Tom Buchy	9

Semifinals
Jim Cotter	6
Ken McArdle	4
Darren Heath	2
Chris Baier	8

To Qualifier B
Jim Cotter	8
Chris Baier	7

Second Knockout
Tom Shypitka	7
Brian Windsor	6
Jody Epp	7
Wylie Eden	2

Quarterfinals
Tom Shypitka	6
Jay Peachey	10
Jody Epp	9
Sean Geall	3

Semifinals
Jay Peachey	6
Jody Epp	3

To Qualifier B
Jay Tuson	5
Jay Peachey	6
Qualifier B
Jim Cotter	7
Jay Peachey	2

=== C Event ===
Third Knockout
Ron Vanderstar	2
Brian Windsor	9
Steve Waatainen	6
Tom Buchy	8

Quarterfinals
Brian Windsor	6
Darren Heath	3
Tom Buchy	7
Jody Epp	8

Semifinals
Brian Windsor	7
Jay Tuson	8
Jody Epp	8
Chris Baier	10

Qualifier C1
Jay Tuson	4
Chris Baier	9

Third Knockout
Neil Dangerfield	9
Wylie Eden	2

Quarterfinals
Neil Dangerfield	8
Ken McArdle	7
Sean Geall	9
Tom Shypitka	6

Semifinals
Neil Dangerfield	5
Sean Geall	6

Qualifier C2
Jay Peachey	5
Sean Geall	6

== Playoffs ==
Page playoff system
1	Brent Pierce	9
2	Jim Cotter	2
3	Chris Baier	9
4	Sean Geall	8

Semifinal
2	Jim Cotter	7
3	Chris Baier	6

Final
1	Brent Pierce	5
2	Jim Cotter	7

=== 1 vs. 2 ===
February 11, 11:00 AM PT

Sheet A	1	2	3	4	5	6	7	8	9	10	Final
Pierce	2	0	1	3	0	2	1	X	X	X	9
Cotter	0	1	0	0	1	0	0	X	X	X	2

=== 3 vs. 4 ===
February 11, 11:00 AM PT

Sheet A	1	2	3	4	5	6	7	8	9	10	11	Final
Baier	1	0	0	1	0	2	2	0	2	0	1	9
Geall	0	2	2	0	1	0	0	2	0	1	0	8

=== Semifinal ===
February 11, 7:30 PM PT

Sheet A	1	2	3	4	5	6	7	8	9	10	11	Final
Cotter	0	0	0	3	0	0	2	0	1	0	1	7
Baier	0	0	1	0	0	1	0	2	0	2	0	6

=== Final ===
February 12, 5:00 PM PT

Sheet A	1	2	3	4	5	6	7	8	9	10	Final
Pierce	1	0	0	0	1	0	2	1	0	0	5
Cotter	0	0	1	1	0	2	0	0	2	1	7

2012 Canadian Direct Insurance BC Men's Championship

Jim Cotter
3rd British Columbia Provincial Championship title
