= BC Men's Curling Championship =

- Established: 1936
- 2026 host city: Esquimalt, British Columbia
- 2026 arena: Archie Browning Sports Centre
- 2026 champion: Cody Tanaka

Current edition
- 2026 BC Men's Curling Championship

The BC Men's Curling Championship (formerly the belairdirect BC Men's Provincial Curling Championship and the Canadian Direct Insurance BC Men's Provincials) is the British Columbia provincial championship for men's curling. It was known as the Safeway Select up to 2003. The tournament is run by Curl BC, the provincial curling association. The winner represents Team British Columbia at the Tim Hortons Brier.

== Qualification ==
The event features ten teams. The defending champions and the top team on the Canadian Team Ranking System from B.C. are invited to play. Two teams from the British Columbia coastal region and from the British Columbia interior earn berths, while and additional two teams from each of those two regions come out of a second round of qualifying.

== Winners ==
Listed below are the provincial champion skips for each year. BC did not participate in the Brier until 1936. Brier champions are denoted in bold

Year	Team	Curling Club
1936	Bill Whalen, Sr., Bill Whalen, Jr., Dap Nation, W. R. Broatch	Vancouver Curling Club
1937	Rollie David, Frank Avery, Fred Tinling, George Norgan	Vancouver Curling Club
1938	Bill Finlay, Fred Tinling, Lionel Tinling, William Lesage	Vancouver Curling Club
1939	Rollie David, Frank Avery, Rollie Wickstrom, George Law	Hastings Curling Club
1940	Bill Finlay, Fred Tinling, Norm Williams, William Lesage	Vancouver Curling Club
1941	Bill Finlay, Fred Tinling, Lionel Tinling, William Lesage	Vancouver Curling Club
1942	Donnie Campbell, Fred Tinling, Lionel Tinling, William Lesage	Vancouver Curling Club
1943	Frank Avery, D. Garnham, F. Steacy, R. Dickson	Vancouver Curling Club
1944	Scotty Marr, Nick Sardich, John Thom, Ole Olsen	Nelson Curling Club
1945	Reg Stone, Pete McIntyre, Roy Stone, Scotty Ross, Art Simonson	Trail Curling Club
1946	Frank Avery, Bob Brown, Bob Henderson, Ned Wiginton	Vancouver Curling Club
1947	Frenchy D'Amour, Bob McGhie, Fred Wendell, Jim Mark	Trail Curling Club
**1948**	**Frenchy D'Amour, Bob McGhie, Fred Wendell, Jim Mark**	**Trail Curling Club**
1949	Reg Stone, Scotty Ross, Roy Stone, Hugh Miller	Trail Curling Club
1950	Elwyn Cartmell, Ty Cobb, Charlie Cook, David Garnham	Vancouver Curling Club
1951	Chess Chesser, Johnny Cameron, Max Gordon, Harry Rothery	Trail Curling Club
1952	Reg Stone, Scotty Ross, Roy Stone, Buzz McGibney	Trail Curling Club
1953	Reg Stone, Roy Stone, Buzz McGibney, Harvey McKay	Trail Curling Club
1954	Elwyn Cartmell, Les Kitson, Jimmy Dickson, Reg Fry	Vancouver Curling Club
1955	Reg Stone, Roy Stone, Buzz McGibney, Hunt McKay	Trail Curling Club
1956	Harold Jordan, Jim Livingstone, Bill Moscovitz, Don Beattie	Kimberley Curling Club
1957	Reg Stone, Roy Stone, Buzz McGibney, Ernie Gordon	Trail Curling Club
1958	Tony Gutoski, Bill Dunstan, Gary Leibel, Dale Dalziel	Victoria Curling Club
1959	Barry Naimark, Fred Langen, Ev Wolfe, Dick Beddoes	Vancouver Curling Club
1960	Glen Harper, Harvey Hodge, Fred Duncan, Vern Kaspick	Duncan Curling Club
1961	Tony Folk, Jim Killburn, George Klotz, Neil Eyben	Peace Arch Curling Club
1962	Reg Stone, Roy Stone, Frenchy D'Amour, Harvey McKay	Trail Curling Club
1963	Glen Harper, Harvey Hodge, Gary Merrett, Vern Kaspick	Duncan Curling Club
**1964**	**Lyall Dagg, Leo Hebert, Fred Britton, Barry Naimark**	**Vancouver Curling Club**
1965	Jack Arnet, Terry Miller, Glen Walker, Soren Jensen	Thunderbird Curling Club
1966	Lynn Mason, Les McCabe, Oren Eberg, Al Thun	Burnaby Winter Club
1967	Buzz McGibney, John Cameron, Tom Feeney, Doug Feeney	Trail Curling Club
1968	Bob McCubbin, Jack Tucker, Ted Trimble, Keith Isaac	Richmond Winter Club
1969	Kevin Smale, Pete Sherba, Pat Carr, Bob McDonald	Prince George Curling Club
1970	Lyall Dagg, Barry Naimark, Leo Hebert, Terry Paulsen	Vancouver Curling Club
1971	Kevin Smale, Pete Sherba, Pat Carr, Bob McDonald	Prince George Curling Club
1972	Bernie Sparkes, Brock Giles, Brent Giles, Brad Giles	North Vancouver Recreation Centre Curling Club
1973	Jack Tucker, Bernie Sparkes, Jim Armstrong, Gerry Peckham	Richmond Winter Club
1974	Jim Armstrong, Bernie Sparkes, Gerry Peckham, Clark Winterton	Richmond Winter Club
1975	Frank Beutle, Ray Jones, Don Wood, Bob Partridge	Granite Curling Club
1976	Bernie Sparkes, Bert Gretzinger, Keiven Bauer, Al Cook	Burnaby Winter Club
1977	Roy Vinthers, Leo Hebert, Greg Pruden, Barry Naimark	Vancouver Curling Club
1978	Bernie Sparkes, Ron Thomson, Al Cook, Keiven Bauer	Vancouver Curling Club
1979	Glen Pierce, Wayne Matthewson, Bruce Davey, Fuji Miki	Vancouver Curling Club
1980	Tim Horrigan, Lowell Goulden, Kelly Horrigan, Dave Smith	Victoria Curling Club
1981	Barry McPhee, Rob Kuroyama, Brian Eden, Grant Young	Kamloops Curling Club
1982	Brent Giles, Greg Monkman, Al Roemer, Brad Giles	Vancouver Curling Club
1983	Bernie Sparkes, Jim Armstrong, Al Cook, Keiven Bauer	Vancouver Curling Club
1984	Bernie Sparkes, Jim Armstrong, Ron Thompson, Jim Heitz	Vancouver Curling Club
1985	Paul Devlin, Doug Meger, Ken Watson, Dale Reiben	Vancouver Curling Club
1986	Barry McPhee, Rob Kuroyama, Brian Eden, Dave Schleppe	Kamloops Curling Club
1987	Bernie Sparkes, Jim Armstrong, Monte Ziola, Jamie Sexton	Vancouver Curling Club
1988	Ron Thompson, Glen Hillson, Graeme Franklin, Rob Robinson	Vancouver Curling Club
1989	Rick Folk, Bert Gretzinger, Rob Koffski, Doug Smith	Kelowna Curling Club
1990	Craig Lepine, Ross Graham, Mike Bradley, Glen McEachran	Vancouver Curling Club
1991	Gerry Kent, Brian Collinson, Tom Shypitka, Ken McHargue	Cranbrook Curling Club
1992	Jim Armstrong, Ron Thompson, Greg Monkman, Ed Fowler	Royal City Curling Club
1993	Rick Folk, Pat Ryan, Bert Gretzinger, Gerry Richard	Kelowna Curling Club
**1994**	**Rick Folk, Pat Ryan, Bert Gretzinger, Gerry Richard**	**Kelowna Curling Club**
1995	Rick Folk, Pat Ryan, Bert Gretzinger, Gerry Richard	Kelowna Curling Club
1996	Barry McPhee, Tony Ebert, Ken Brown, Bert Hinch	Kamloops Curling Club
1997	Barry McPhee, Dave Schleppe, Ken Brown, Bert Hinc	Kamloops Curling Club
1998	Greg McAulay, Brent Pierce, Bryan Miki, Darin Fenton	Royal City Curling Club
1999	Bert Gretzinger, Bob Ursel, Mark Whittle, Dave Mellof	Kelowna Curling Club
**2000**	**Greg McAulay, Brent Pierce, Bryan Miki, Jody Sveistrup**	**Royal City Curling Club**
2001	Dean Joanisse, Jay Tuson, Glen Jackson, Randy Tervo	Victoria Curling Club
2002	Pat Ryan, Deane Horning, Kevin MacKenzie, Rob Koffski	Kelowna Curling Club
2003	Pat Ryan, Bob Ursel, Deane Horning, Kevin MacKenzie	Kelowna Curling Club
2004	Jay Peachey, Ron Leech, Kevin Recksiedler, Brad Fenton	Royal City Curling Club
2005	Deane Horning, Fred Thomson, Don Freschi, Rob Nobert, Grant Fines	Trail Curling Club
2006	Brian Windsor, Dennis Graber, Randy Nelson, Bill Johnson	Kamloops Curling Club
2007	Dean Joanisse, Mike Wood, Dave Nantes, Chris Atchison	Victoria Curling Club
2008	Bob Ursel, Jim Cotter, Kevin Folk, Rick Sawatsky	Kelowna Curling Club
2009	Sean Geall, Brent Pierce, Kevin Recksiedler, Mark Olson	Royal City Curling Club
2010	Jeff Richard, Tom Shypitka, Tyler Orme, Chris Anderson	Kelowna Curling Club
2011	Jim Cotter, Ken Maskiewich, Kevin Folk, Rick Sawatsky	Kelowna Curling Club
2012	Jim Cotter, Kevin Folk, Tyrel Griffith, Rick Sawatsky	Kelowna Curling Club
2013	Andrew Bilesky, Steve Kopf, Derek Errington, Aaron Watson	Royal City Curling Club
2014	John Morris, Jim Cotter, Tyrel Griffith, Rick Sawatsky	Kelowna Curling Club
2015	Jim Cotter, Ryan Kuhn, Tyrel Griffith, Rick Sawatsky	Vernon Curling Club & Kelowna Curling Club
2016	Jim Cotter, Ryan Kuhn, Tyrel Griffith, Rick Sawatsky	Vernon Curling Club & Kelowna Curling Club
2017	John Morris Jim Cotter, Tyrel Griffith, Rick Sawatsky	Vernon Curling Club & Kelowna Curling Club
2018	Sean Geall, Jeffrey Richard, Andrew Nerpin, David Harper	Kelowna Curling Club
2019	Jim Cotter, Steve Laycock, Tyrel Griffith, Rick Sawatsky	Vernon Curling Club & Kelowna Curling Club
2020	Jim Cotter, Steve Laycock, Andrew Nerpin, Rick Sawatsky	Vernon Curling Club & Kelowna Curling Club
2021	Cancelled due to the COVID-19 pandemic in British Columbia. Team Laycock (Steve Laycock, Jim Cotter, Andrew Nerpin, Rick Sawatsky) represented B.C. at Brier.	
2022	Brent Pierce, Jeff Richard, Jared Kolomaya, Nicholas Meister	Royal City CC, Langley CC, Kelowna CC & Kamloops CC
2023	Jacques Gauthier, Sterling Middleton, Jason Ginter, Alex Horvath	Victoria Curling Club
2024	Catlin Schneider, Jason Ginter, Sterling Middleton, Alex Horvath	Victoria Curling Club
2025	Cameron de Jong, Alex Horvath, Corey Chester, Brayden Carpenter	Victoria Curling Club
2026	Cody Tanaka, Jared Kolomaya, Mitchell Kopytko, Coburn Fadden	Kamloops Curling Club & Richmond Curling Club

== See also ==
- BC Women's Curling Championship
