= Westcoast Curling Classic =

Former World Curling Tour event

The Westcoast Curling Classic (formerly the Key West Ford Westcoast Curling Classic, the Allied Windows Westcoast Curling Classic and the PriceWaterhouseCoopers Westcoast Curling Classic) was an annual curling tournament, held on Thanksgiving weekend in New Westminster, British Columbia. It was one of the early curling tournaments of the World Curling Tour season. It was cancelled after 12 years on the tour.

== Past champions ==
Year	Winning skip	Runner-up skip	Purse (CAD)
2001	(British Columbia) Greg McAulay	(British Columbia) Jay Peachey	$20,000
2002	(Alberta) Kevin Martin	(Alberta) Kevin Koe	$46,500
2003	(Manitoba) Jeff Stoughton	(British Columbia) Bob Ursel	$50,000
2004	(Manitoba) David Hamblin	(Alberta) Kevin Martin	$60,000
2005	(Alberta) Kevin Martin	(Ontario) Mike Harris	$60,000
2006	(Alberta) Kevin Martin	(Saskatchewan) Pat Simmons	$64,000
2007	(Alberta) Kevin Koe	(British Columbia) Bob Ursel	$64,000
2008	(Alberta) Kevin Martin	(Alberta) Randy Ferbey	$64,000
2009	(British Columbia) Bob Ursel	(British Columbia) Sean Geall	$80,000
2010	(Alberta) Kevin Martin	(Alberta) Kevin Koe	$80,000
2011	(Alberta) Kevin Martin	(Manitoba) Mike McEwen	$80,000
2012	(Alberta) Kevin Martin	(British Columbia) Andrew Bilesky	$52,000
