= Sébastien Robillard =

Canadian curler

- Curler
- Born: October 19, 1981 (age 45); Sussex, New Brunswick

Team
- Curling club: Royal City CC, New Westminster
- Skip: Matthew Blandford
- Third: Cameron de Jong
- Second: Sébastien Robillard
- Lead: Cody Johnston

Curling career
- Member Association: Ontario (1998–2006; 2014–2018); Quebec (2006–2010); British Columbia (2010–2014; 2018–present)
- Top CTRS ranking: 16th (2025–26)

Sébastien Jean Joseph Robillard (born October 19, 1981, in Sussex, New Brunswick) is a Canadian curler from Port Coquitlam, British Columbia. He currently plays second on Team Matthew Blandford. He has played competitively in three provinces in his career, Ontario, Quebec and British Columbia.

== Career ==
=== Juniors ===
Robillard won the first ever Ontario provincial Bantam boys championship in 1998. In 2002 he won the now defunct provincial junior mixed championship skipping a team of Julie Reddick, Kevin Flewwelling and Leigh Armstrong.

=== Men's ===
After a few seasons of skipping teams out of Ontario and one season playing second for Heath McCormick, Robillard played lead on the Quebec-based Dwayne Fowler rink for the 2006-07 curling season. The team won the Tim Hortons Invitational Classic that season and played in the 2007 Quebec Men's Provincial Championship. After one season with Fowler, Robillard played third for Guy Hemmings in 2007-08 and for Michael Fournier in 2008–09.

Robillard then moved to British Columbia, playing third for Andrew Bilesky for the 2010–11 season before forming his own rink in 2011. After skipping for one season, Robillard joined the Sean Geall rink, playing second in 2012. In their first season together, they played in the 2013 Canadian Direct Insurance BC Men's Curling Championship, losing in the semifinal. The next season, the team won the Coronation Business Group Men's Classic and finished third at the 2014 Canadian Direct Insurance BC Men's Curling Championship, with Brent Pierce skipping the team. Robillard left the team in 2014 to form his own rink for one last season in British Columbia.

In 2015, Robillard moved back to Ontario, and joined the Chris Gardner rink for the 2015–16 season, playing third for the team. After one season with Gardner, Robillard formed his own rink in 2016. Robillard won the 2018 Ontario Colts Championship, qualifying his rink for the 2018 Ontario Tankard. There, he led his rink of Ryan McCrady, Bowie Abbis-Mills and Andrew Denny-Petch to the playoffs, where they lost to Team Codey Maus.

Robillard joined the Glenn Venance out of BC as third in 2024, where they qualified for the 2025 BC Men's Curling Championship, losing in the final to Cameron de Jong 10–8 in the final. At the beginning of the 2025–26 season, Robillard announced he was joining the Matthew Blandford rink. The team would start off strong, finishing second at the 2025 Saville Shootout, losing to Cameron de Jong in the final.

== Personal life ==
Robillard attended the University of Ottawa and currently works as a regional director for RBC. His sister is also a world class curler Melanie Robillard who lives in Europe and was an Olympic curling athlete playing for Germany at the Vancouver Winter Olympics in 2010 and subsequently winning the Women World Curling Championships in 2010.
