= Ryan Kuhn =

Canadian curler

- Curler
- Born: Vernon, British Columbia

Team
- Curling club: Vernon CC, Vernon, BC

Curling career
- Brier: 2 (2015, 2016)
- Grand Slam victories: 0
Medal record
Curling
World Junior Championships
Gold medal – first place	2000 Geising
Canada Winter Games
Silver medal – second place	1999 Corner Brook

Ryan Kuhn (born December 26, 1982) is a Canadian curler from Vernon, British Columbia.

== Career ==
Kuhn won the 2000 Canadian Junior Curling Championships playing second on a rink skipped by his brother Brad. The team then went on to win the 2000 World Junior Curling Championships. After having won the 2000 British Columbia Junior Championships, Kuhn won again in 2002 as a skip. He led his team of Steve Bauer, Tyrel Griffith and Cameron Watt to an 8–4 record at the 2002 Canadian Juniors, missing the playoffs in 4th place.

Kuhn played in one season on the World Curling Tour with his brother in 2005–06. He returned to the tour in 2014 as a member of the Jim Cotter rink, replacing John Morris. Over the course of the season, he played in two Grand Slams, the 2014 Masters of Curling and the 2014 Canadian Open of Curling, losing in the quarter-finals in the latter. The team also played in the 2014 Canada Cup of Curling. In 2015, Kuhn won his first provincial championship and played in his first Brier at the 2015 Tim Hortons Brier as a member of team British Columbia.

== Personal life ==
Kuhn is employed as a pilot for WestJet. He is married to Robbi Kuhn and has three children.
