= Jason Montgomery =

Canadian curler

- Curler

Team
- Curling club: Victoria CC, Victoria, BC
- Skip: Jason Montgomery
- Third: Chris Baier
- Second: Miles Craig
- Lead: Troy Cowan

Curling career
- Member Association: British Columbia
- Top CTRS ranking: 49th (2023–24)

Jason Montgomery is a Canadian curler from Shawnigan Lake, British Columbia.

Montgomery is a former provincial junior champion. He skipped British Columbia at the 2003 Canadian Junior Curling Championships. His team of Cliff Carr-Hilton, Miles Craig and Will Duggan placed 4th (8-4), and they lost in the tiebreaker game to Alberta.

Montgomery skipped the British Columbia team at the 2010 Canadian Mixed Curling Championship. His team which included Sarah Wark, Will Duggan and Nicole Montgomery finished with an 8-3 round robin record, losing in the semi-final to Ontario.

Montgomery won his first World Curling Tour event at the 2010 Red Deer Curling Classic.
