= Jay Wakefield =

Canadian curler

- Curler
- Born: Newmarket, Ontario

Team
- Curling club: Golden Ears CC, Maple Ridge, BC

Jay Wakefield is a Canadian curler from Maple Ridge, British Columbia.

== Career ==
Wakefield's lone provincial junior championship came in 2008 when his team of lead Jamie Danbrook, second Paul Cseke and fourth Chase Martyn won the event. The team thus qualified to represent British Columbia at the 2008 Canadian Junior Curling Championships. At the Juniors, the rink finished the round robin with a 5-7 record, missing the playoffs.

After juniors, Wakefield quickly joined the men's curling scene. He qualified for his first provincial championship in 2010 as a skip, with teammates Cseke (throwing fourth stones), third Derek Errington and lead John Cullen. The rink went 4-5 at the event, missing the playoffs. The following season, Wakefield, Cseke and Cullen joined the Brent Pierce rink. Wakefield would throw second stones for the team. That team qualified for the 2011 Canadian Direct Insurance BC Men's Championship, but finished 3-6 in the event, missing the playoffs. The following season, Wakefield and Cullen joined forces with Chris Baier. Wakefield would continue to throw second stones. That team made the 2012 Canadian Direct Insurance BC Men's Championship, which would have a new format. That team did qualify for the playoffs, but lost in the provincial semi-final to Jim Cotter.

On the World Curling Tour, Wakefield has two event wins to his credit. He won the 2011 Seattle Cash Spiel over Jody Epp and he won the 2012 Vancouver Island Shootout over Neil Dangerfield.
