= Tom Buchy =

Canadian curler

Thomas Buchy (born April 11, 1967) is a Canadian curler and coach from Marysville, British Columbia. At the 2008 Tim Hortons Brier, Buchy was the alternate for the Bob Ursel team out of the Kelowna Curling Club. Buchy has also been to four Canadian Mixed Curling Championships and one Canadian Senior Curling Championships as skip.

Buchy was born in Kimberley, British Columbia.
