= Sean Geall =

Canadian curler

- Curler

Team
- Curling club: Abbotsford CC; Abbotsford, BC
- Skip: Sean Geall
- Third: Brad Wood
- Second: Mitchell Kopytko
- Lead: Darin Gerow

Curling career
- Brier: 3 (2009, 2013, 2018)

Sean Geall (/ˈɡiːl/ GEEL); (born January 29, 1975, in Surrey, British Columbia) is a Canadian curler from Tappen, British Columbia.

== Curling career ==
To date, Geall has two provincial championships to his credit, and thus two Brier appearances. Geall and his Royal City Curling Club rink of Brent Pierce, Kevin Recksiedler and Mark Olson won the 2009 Canadian Direct Insurance BC Men's Provincials by defeating Jay Peachey 8-7 in the final. This qualified the team to represent British Columbia at the 2009 Tim Hortons Brier. At the Brier, Geall's team finished the round robin with a 6–5 record, missing the playoffs.

Geall would play with the same team for the following season, but formed a new rink in 2010 with Grant Dezura, Scott Meechan and Kevin MacKenzie. Geall formed a new rink once again in 2011 with Ken Maskiewich, Bill Fisher and bringing Olson back at lead. In 2012, Geall kept Olson at lead, but brought in Jay Peachey as third and Sebastien Robillard at second. In 2013, Peachey was replaced by Brent Pierce who would skip the team, playing third position. That season, the team won the 2013 Coronation Business Group Men's Classic.

In 2014, Pierce and Robillard left the rink, and were replaced with Andrew Bilesky and Steve Kopf respectively, with Pierce resuming skipping duty. In 2015, the team would win the 2015 Hub International Crown of Curling.

In 2016, Geall formed a new team with Jeff Richard, Brendan Willis and David Harper. In 2017, Willis was replaced by Andrew Nerpin. The team would go on to win the September 2017 King Cash Spiel. In 2018, Geall would win his second provincial championship, defeating Jim Cotter in the final in an extra end.

== Personal life ==
Geall works as a utility equipment sales and rental manager for Commercial Truck Equipment Co. He is married and has three children.
