= Dean Joanisse =

Canadian curler (born 1971)

- Curler
- Born: December 8, 1971 (age 54); Victoria, British Columbia, Canada

Team
- Curling club: Royal City CC, New Westminster, BC
- Skip: Dean Joanisse
- Third: Grant Dezura
- Second: Brendan Willis
- Lead: Neil Cursons

Curling career
- Brier: 2 (2001, 2007)
- Top CTRS ranking: 23rd (2015-16)

Dean A. "Skippy" Joanisse (born December 8, 1971) is a Canadian curler from Maple Ridge, British Columbia.

== Career ==
Joanisse is most notable for skipping his British Columbia team to the 1989 Canadian Junior Curling Championships title, qualifying him to represent Canada at the 1990 World Junior Curling Championships. At the World Juniors, he lost to Peja Lindholm's team from Sweden in the bronze medal final.

Joanisse also skipped two teams to the Brier. At the 2001 Nokia Brier his team finished with a 4-7 record. He would make the Brier again in 2007, where he would also finish at a 4-7 record. He qualified for the 2007 Brier by defeating Greg McAulay 8–6 in the BC final.

Joanisse's profession is a curling artist.
