= Andrew Bilesky =

Canadian curler

- Curler

Team
- Curling club: Royal City CC, New Westminster, BC
- Skip: Dean Joanisse
- Third: Andrew Bilesky
- Second: Steve Kopf
- Lead: Aaron Watson
- Alternate: Steve Petryk

Curling career
- Brier: 1 (2013)

Andrew Bilesky is a Canadian curler from New Westminster, British Columbia.

== Career ==
Bilesky has skipped teams on the World Curling Tour since the 2009–10 curling season. His best finish to date is as champion at the 2011 Kamloops Crown of Curling.

Bilesky won his first Men’s provincial curling championship in 2013 after defeating Brent Pierce in the final. He went on to represent British Columbia at the Brier for the first time, finishing tied for last place with a 1–10 win–loss record.

Bilesky also won the 2001 BC Junior curling championship to represent British Columbia at the Canadian Juniors finishing with a 5-7 record.
