= Jeff Richard =

Canadian curler (born 1979)

- Curler
- Born: March 24, 1979 (age 47); Kelowna, British Columbia

Team
- Curling club: Kelowna CC; Kelowna, British Columbia
- Skip: Jeff Richard
- Third: Richard Krell
- Second: Daniel Wenzek
- Lead: Connor Deane
- Mixed doubles partner: Sarah Wark

Curling career
- Member Association: British Columbia
- Brier: 3 (2010, 2018, 2022)
- Top CTRS ranking: 25th (2022–23)

Jeffrey Richard (born March 24, 1979) is a Canadian curler from Lake Country, British Columbia. He currently skips his own team out of Kelowna.

== Career ==
To date, Richard has won two provincial championships and has made two Brier appearances. In 2010, Richard won the 2010 BC Men's provincial as skip.

In 2016, Richard joined Team Geall.

In 2017, Richard played in the Canadian Mixed Doubles with Sarah Wark

In 2018, Richard would win his second provincial title, defeating Team Cotter in the final in an extra end.

== Personal life ==
Jeff Richard grew up in a family of curlers. His father is World and Canadian champion curler and coach Gerry Richard. His sister Jeanna Schraeder played third for the World and Canadian champion team Kelly Scott.

Richard is the manager at Sunset Ranch Golf & Country Club in Kelowna. He is married to Brooklyn Leitch and has one son.
