= Tyrel Griffith =

Canadian curler (born 1985)

- Curler
- Born: December 22, 1985 (age 40); Calgary, Alberta, Canada

Team
- Curling club: Kelowna CC, Kelowna, BC
- Mixed doubles partner: Jennifer Armstrong

Curling career
- Brier: 6 (2012, 2014, 2015, 2016, 2017, 2019)
- Top CTRS ranking: 8th (2013–14 & 2016–17)
- Grand Slam victories: 1 (2017 Elite 10)
Medal record
Curling
Representing British Columbia
Canadian Olympic Curling Trials
Silver medal – second place	2013 Winnipeg
Tim Hortons Brier
Silver medal – second place	2014 Kamloops
Canadian Mixed Doubles Championship
Silver medal – second place	2019 Fredericton

Tyrel James "Ty" Griffith (born December 22, 1985) is a Canadian curler from Kelowna, British Columbia.

== Personal life ==
Griffith was born in Calgary. He is employed as a Canada golf operations manager/PGA of Canada Golf professional at the Black Mountain Golf Club. He is married.

== Teams ==
Season	Skip	Third	Second	Lead
2009–10	Tyrel Griffith	Darren Nelson	Brad Wood	Darin Gerow
2010–11	Tyrel Griffith	Darren Nelson	Brad Wood	Darin Gerow
2011–12	Jim Cotter	Kevin Folk	Tyrel Griffith	Rick Sawatsky
2012–13	Jim Cotter	Jason Gunnlaugson	Tyrel Griffith	Rick Sawatsky
2013–14	Jim Cotter (Fourth)	John Morris (Skip)	Tyrel Griffith	Rick Sawatsky
2014–15	Jim Cotter	Ryan Kuhn	Tyrel Griffith	Rick Sawatsky
2015–16	Jim Cotter	Ryan Kuhn	Tyrel Griffith	Rick Sawatsky
2016–17	Jim Cotter (Fourth)	John Morris (Skip)	Tyrel Griffith	Rick Sawatsky
2017–18	Jim Cotter (Fourth)	John Morris (Skip)	Catlin Schneider	Tyrel Griffith
2018–19	Jim Cotter	Steve Laycock	Tyrel Griffith	Rick Sawatsky
2021–22	Jim Cotter	Tyrel Griffith	Andrew Nerpin	Rick Sawatsky
