= Brent Pierce =

Canadian curler

- Curler
- Born: July 7, 1969 (age 57); New Westminster, British Columbia, Canada

Team
- Curling club: Royal City CC; New Westminster
- Skip: Brent Pierce
- Fourth: Dustin Kalthoff
- Second: Josh Heidt
- Lead: Logan Ede
- Alternate: Jason Jacobson

Curling career
- Member Association: British Columbia (1987–2025); Saskatchewan (2025–present)
- Brier: 4 (1998, 2000, 2009, 2022)
- World Championship: 1 (2000)
- Top CTRS ranking: 13th (2008–09)
Medal record
Men's curling
Representing Canada
World Curling Championships
Gold medal – first place	2000 Glasgow
Representing British Columbia
Labatt Brier
Gold medal – first place	2000 Saskatoon

Brent Pierce (born July 7, 1969) is a Canadian curler and coach from New Westminster, British Columbia. He currently plays third and skips Team Dustin Kalthoff.

== Career ==
Pierce is a 1987 provincial junior champion skip, and a four-time provincial champion, former national and world champion playing third for Greg McAulay. Pierce last represented BC at the Brier in 2009 with the Sean Geall team.

Pierce's 1987 Vancouver team of Darin Fenton, Bryan Miki, and Ross Graham won the provincial championships, qualifying them for the 1987 Canadian Junior Curling Championships in Prince Albert, Saskatchewan. They finished the round-robin with a 7–4 record. This qualified them for the playoffs, where the lost in the semifinals to Team Ontario, skipped by Wayne Middaugh.

Pierce didn't make it back to a national tournament until 1998 when he had joined forces with Greg McAulay as his third. That year, they won the B.C. provincial championship, qualifying them for the 1998 Labatt Brier. At the Brier, they finished with a 7–4 record. This forced them into a tiebreaker, which they ended up losing to Team Saskatchewan, skipped by Rod Montgomery.

Two years later, Team McAulay won the BC championships once again, and this time also won the 2000 Labatt Brier. They defeated Russ Howard's New Brunswick team in the final. This qualified the team to the World Curling Championships, where they represented Canada. They claimed the gold medal at the event, defeating Sweden's Peja Lindholm.

Pierce also appeared in the Brier again in 2009 as third for the Sean Geall team, placing 5th with a 6–5 record. On the team were Kevin Recksiedler at second and lead Mark Olson. After that season Pierce began skipping his own team. Pierce won the BC Men's Championship in 2022, going on to represent BC at the Brier.

== Awards ==
- British Columbia Sports Hall of Fame: inducted in 2002 with all of 2000 Greg McAulay team, Canadian and World champions

== Personal life ==
Pierce works as a senior sales representative. He is married and has two children.
