= Royal City Curling Club =

Construction of the Royal City Curling Club in New Westminster, British Columbia, Canada, began in August 1965, and was completed in January 1966. The club's first president was George Reid, and its first ice maker was Don Bowman. Since its completion, renovations have been done on it twice, once in 1987 and again in 1994.

== National Representatives From Royal City CC ==
- 1972 - BC & Canadian Mixed Champion - Trev Fisher
- 1974 - BC Mixed Champion - Bill Kennedy
- 1980 - BC Ladies Champion - Joan Dexter
- 1985 - Senior Women's Champion - Lou Logan
- 1987 - BC Junior Men's Champion - Brent Pierce
- 1992 - BC Men's Champion - Jim Armstrong
- 1995 - BC Ladies Champion - Marla Geiger
- 1995 - BC Senior Men's Champion - Wayne Matthewson
- 1996 - Men's & Ladies' Deaf Curling Champions
- 1996 - BC Senior Men's Champion - Ed Dezura
- 1997 - BC Senior Men's Champion - Wayne Matthewson
- 1998 - BC Men's Champion - Greg McAulay
- 2000 - BC, Canadian & World Men's Champion - Greg McAulay
- 2000 - BC Master Men's Champion - Trev Fisher
- 2001 - BC Junior Men's Champion - Andrew Bilesky
- 2001 - Canadian Olympic Trials Champion - Kelley Law
- 2002 - BC Senior Men's Champion - Jamie McTavish
- 2002 - Olympic Bronze Medalists - Kelley Law Team
- 2004 - BC Juvenile Women's Champion - Kayla Chandler
- 2004 - BC Senior Ladies / Canadian Runner-up - Kathy Smiley
- 2004 - BC Ladies Champions - Georgina Wheatcroft
- 2004 - BC Men's Champions / Brier Semifinalist - Jay Peachey
- 2005 - BC Senior Ladies/Canadian Runner-up - Kathy Smiley
- 2005 - BC Senior Men's Champions - Jamie McTavish
- 2006 - Canadian Deaf Curling Champions - Bob Collins
- 2007 - Canadian Deaf Curling Champions - Bob Collins
- 2007 - BC Master Men's Champions - Hank Enns
- 2007 - BC Master Women's Champions - Eleanor Pierce
- 2007 - BC Senior Women's Champions / Canadian Runner-up - Kathy Smiley
- 2007 - BC Ladies Champions - Kelley Law
- 2008 - BC Mixed Champions - Bryan Miki
- 2008 - BC Junior Men's Champions - Jay Wakefield
- 2008 - BC & Canadian Master Men's Champions - Rick Pughe
- 2009 - BC Mixed Champions - Greg Monkman
- 2009 - BC Men's Champions - Sean Geall
- 2009 - BC Senior Women's Champions / Canadian Runner-up - Kathy Smiley
- 2009 - BC Masters Men's Champions / Canadian Runner-up - Rick Pughe
- 2009 - BC Master Women's Champions - Carol McFadden
- 2012 - BC Master Men's Champions - Rick Pughe
- 2013 - BC Mixed Doubles Champions - Tyler Tardi / Dezaray Hawes
- 2013 - BC Men's Champions - Andrew Bilesky
- 2014 - BC Junior Women's Champions / Canadian Runner-up - Kalia Van Osch
- 2014 - BC Juvenile Women's Champions - Dezaray Hawes
- 2014 - BC Juvenile Men's Champions - Brayden Carpenter
- 2015 - BC Juvenile Men's Champions / Optimist International Semi-Finalists - Matthew McCrady
- 2015 - BC Mixed Doubles Champions - Tyler Tardi / Dezaray Hawes
- 2015 - BC Mixed Champions - Dean Joanisse
- 2016 - BC Junior Men's Champions / Canadian Bronze Medalists - Tyler Tardi
- 2016 - BC Junior Women's Champions / Canadian Runner-up - Sarah Daniels
- 2016 - BC Juvenile Men's Champions / Optimist International Bronze Medalists - Matthew McCrady

== Major Events Hosted at Royal City CC ==
- 1997 - Canadian Police National Championship
- 2000 - B.C. Safeway Select
- 2001 - JVC Women's Skins Game
