= 2020 BC Men's Curling Championship =

- Host city: Cranbrook, British Columbia
- Arena: Western Financial Place
- Dates: January 28 – February 2
- Winner: Team Cotter
- Curling club: Kelowna Curling Club, Kelowna; Vernon Curling Club, Vernon
- Skip: Jim Cotter
- Third: Steve Laycock
- Second: Andrew Nerpin
- Lead: Rick Sawatsky
- Finalist: Tyler Tardi

The 2020 BC Men's Curling Championship, the provincial men's curling championship for British Columbia, was held from January 28 to February 2, 2020, at the Western Financial Place in Cranbrook. The winning Jim Cotter rink represented British Columbia at the 2020 Tim Hortons Brier in Kingston, Ontario and finished with a 2–5 record. The event was held in conjunction with the 2020 British Columbia Scotties Tournament of Hearts.

Jim Cotter won his ninth BC Men's Curling Championship when he defeated former world junior champion Tyler Tardi 10–6 in the final.

== Teams ==
The teams are listed as follows:

Skip	Third	Second	Lead	Alternate	Club(s)
Jim Cotter	Steve Laycock	Andrew Nerpin	Rick Sawatsky		Kelowna/Vernon
Neil Dangerfield	Denis Sutton	Darren Boden	Glen Allen		Victoria
Rob Dennis	Doug Kilborn	Brad Blackwell	Rick Miller		Royal City/Salmon Arm
Sean Geall	Jared Kolomaya	Sébastien Robillard	Nicholas Meister		Abbotsford/Kamloops/Royal City/Langley
Glen Jackson	Andrew Komlodi	Jason Clarke	Joel Cave		Victoria
Dean Joanisse	Andrew Bilesky	Steve Kopf	Aaron Watson	Steve Petryk	Golden Ears/Royal City
Mark Longworth	Michael Longworth	Rob Nobert	Cam Weir		Vernon
Chris Medford	Steve Tersmette	Mitch Young	Jeff Langin	Josh Kennelly	Cranbrook
Jason Montgomery	Chris Baier	Miles Craig	Will Duggan		Victoria
Brad Thompson (Fourth)	Grant Olsen (Skip)	Trevor Miyahara	Brent Yamada		Kamloops
Jeffrey Richard	Tyler Klymchuk	Corey Cheste	Rhys Gamache		Kelowna
Nando Salviulo	Jamie Ingram	Cody Bartlett	Kevin Maffioli		Castlegar
Tyler Tardi	Sterling Middleton	Jordan Tardi	Alex Horvath		Langley/Victoria
Aaron Thompson	Jack Holmes	Derek Smith	Scott Robertson		Vancouver
Daniel Wenzek	Cameron de Jong	Cody Tanaka	Nicholas Umbach	Jeff Guignard	Royal City, Tunnel Town/Victoria
Brad Wood	Matt Tolley	Nathan Small	John Slattery		Vernon/Penticton

== Knockout brackets ==
The draw is listed as follows:

=== A Event ===
First knockout
Jim Cotter	7
Nando Salviulo	4
Neil Dangerfield	8
Glen Jackson	3
Jason Montgomery	9
Rob Dennis	6
Sean Geall	11
Grant Olsen	2
Tyler Tardi	10
Aaron Thompson	1
Dean Joanisse	4
Mark Longworth	3
Jeffrey Richard	9
Brad Wood	5
Daniel Wenzek	6
Chris Medford	7

Quarterfinals
Jim Cotter	5
Neil Dangerfield	4
Jason Montgomery	9
Sean Geall	3
Tyler Tardi	7
Dean Joanisse	8
Jeffrey Richard	6
Chris Medford	4

Semifinals
Jim Cotter	10
Jason Montgomery	7
Dean Joanisse	7
Jeffrey Richard	3

Qualifier 1
Jim Cotter	10
Dean Joanisse	3

=== B Event ===
Second knockout
Nando Salviulo	7
Glen Jackson	4
Rob Dennis	5
Grant Olsen	6
Aaron Thompson	1
Mark Longworth	9
Brad Wood	9
Daniel Wenzek	2

Round of 16
Nando Salviulo	3
Tyler Tardi	7
Chris Medford	8
Grant Olsen	6
Mark Longworth	9
Neil Dangerfield	5
Brad Wood	8
Sean Geall	6

Quarterfinals
Jeffrey Richard	4
Tyler Tardi	11
Chris Medford	6
Jason Montgomery	9
Mark Longworth	7
Brad Wood	4

Semifinals
Tyler Tardi	5
Jason Montgomery	7
Dean Joanisse	5
Mark Longworth	9

Qualifier 2
Jason Montgomery	3
Mark Longworth	8

=== C Event ===
Third knockout
Glen Jackson	5
Grant Olsen	4
Daniel Wenzek	10
Aaron Thompson	5

Quarterfinals
Glen Jackson	5
Neil Dangerfield	9
Jeffrey Richard	3
Daniel Wenzek	9

Semifinals
Neil Dangerfield	5
Tyler Tardi	12
Dean Joanisse	2
Daniel Wenzek	6

Qualifier 3
Tyler Tardi	8
Daniel Wenzek	2

Third knockout
Rob Dennis	8
Nando Salviulo	2

Quarterfinals
Rob Dennis	4
Sean Geall	9
Chris Medford	8
Brad Wood	5

Semifinals
Sean Geall	6
Chris Medford	3

Qualifier 4
Sean Geall	2
Jason Montgomery	6

== Playoffs ==
Page playoff system
A	Jim Cotter	8
B	Mark Longworth	3
C1	Tyler Tardi	7
C2	Jason Montgomery	2

Semifinal
B	Mark Longworth	4
C1	Tyler Tardi	9

Final
A	Jim Cotter	10
C1	Tyler Tardi	6

=== A vs. B ===
Saturday, February 1, 2:00 pm

Sheet 2	1	2	3	4	5	6	7	8	9	10	Final
Jim Cotter 🔨	0	2	0	0	0	0	2	2	2	X	8
Mark Longworth	2	0	1	0	0	0	0	0	0	X	3

=== C1 vs. C2 ===
Saturday, February 1, 2:00 pm

Sheet 1	1	2	3	4	5	6	7	8	9	10	Final
Tyler Tardi 🔨	0	1	1	0	0	3	0	2	X	X	7
Jason Montgomery	0	0	0	0	1	0	1	0	X	X	2

=== Semifinal ===
Saturday, February 1, 7:00 pm

Sheet 2	1	2	3	4	5	6	7	8	9	10	Final
Mark Longworth 🔨	0	0	2	0	1	0	0	1	0	X	4
Tyler Tardi	1	1	0	2	0	2	2	0	1	X	9

=== Final ===
Sunday, February 2, 2:00 pm

Sheet 2	1	2	3	4	5	6	7	8	9	10	Final
Jim Cotter 🔨	1	0	2	0	1	0	2	1	1	2	10
Tyler Tardi	0	2	0	2	0	2	0	0	0	0	6

2020 BC Men's Curling Championship

Jim Cotter
9th British Columbia Provincial Championship title
