= 2022 BC Men's Curling Championship =

- Host city: Kamloops, British Columbia
- Arena: Kamloops Curling Club
- Dates: January 4–9
- Winner: Team Richard
- Curling club: Royal City CC, New Westminster, Langley CC, Langley, Kelowna CC, Kelowna; Kamloops CC, Kamloops
- Skip: Brent Pierce
- Third: Jeff Richard
- Second: Jared Kolomaya
- Lead: Nicholas Meister
- Finalist: Paul Cseke

The 2022 BC Men's Curling Championship, the provincial men's curling championship for British Columbia, was held from January 4 to 9 at the Kamloops Curling Club in Kamloops, British Columbia. The winning Jeff Richard team represented British Columbia at the 2022 Tim Hortons Brier in Lethbridge, Alberta. The event was held in conjunction with the 2022 British Columbia Scotties Tournament of Hearts, the provincial women's curling championship.

The event was originally intended to be played at the McArthur Island Event Centre, but was moved behind closed-doors to the Kamloops Curling Club due to COVID-19 precautions.

== Teams ==
The teams are listed as follows:

Skip	Third	Second	Lead	Alternate	Club(s)
Jim Cotter	Grant Olsen	Andrew Nerpin	Rick Sawatsky		Vernon CC / Kelowna CC / Kamloops CC
Paul Cseke	Corey Chester	Jay Wakefield	Ryan Cassidy	Ty Russell	Victoria CC
Neil Dangerfield	Dennis Sutton	Darren Boden	Connar Croteau		Victoria CC
Cameron de Jong	Andrew Komlodi	Matt Tolley	John Slattery		Victoria CC / Penticton CC / Vernon CC
Sean Geall	Brad Wood	Steve Kopf	Andrew Bilesky		Salmon Arm CC / Penticton CC / Royal City CC
Dean Joanisse	Daniel Wenzek	Cody Johnston	Jeff Guignard		Golden Ears WC
Josh Kennelly	Steven Tersmette	Mitchell Young	Jeffrey Langin		Cranbrook CC / Kimberley CC
Mitchell Kopytko	Calder Fadden	Coburn Fadden	Cooper Fadden		Kamloops CC
Rob Nobert	Kelly McQuiggan	Jesse Monette	Cam Weir	Logan Miron	Vernon CC
Brent Pierce (Note: Brent Pierce skips the team and throws fourth stones, however, they are called Team Jeff Richard.)	Jeff Richard	Jared Kolomaya	Nicholas Meister		Royal City CC / Langley CC / Kelowna CC / Kamloops CC
Sébastien Robillard	Bowie Abbis-Mills	Cody Tanaka	Nathan Small	Matthew McCrady	Royal City CC / Nelson CC
Tyler Tardi	Sterling Middleton	Jason Ginter	Jordan Tardi		Langley CC

== Knockout brackets ==
=== A event ===
First knockout	Qualifier 1
Tyler Tardi	7
Cameron de Jong	5	Sean Geall	6
Sean Geall	6	Tyler Tardi	6
Paul Cseke	10
Jim Cotter	8
Paul Cseke	10	Paul Cseke	9
Mitchell Kopytko	3	Paul Cseke	8
Jeff Richard	2
Rob Nobert	1
Jeff Richard	8	Jeff Richard	7
Josh Kennelly	6	Jeff Richard	9
Sébastien Robillard	2
Sébastien Robillard	10
Dean Joanisse	10	Dean Joanisse	4
Neil Dangerfield	7

=== B event ===
Second knockout	Qualifier 2
Jeff Richard	7
Jim Cotter	6
Sébastien Robillard	4
Josh Kennelly	2	Jim Cotter	8
Jim Cotter	11	Jim Cotter	8
Neil Dangerfield	7	Neil Dangerfield	1
Sean Geall	6	Jim Cotter	7
Tyler Tardi	3
Tyler Tardi	8
Cameron de Jong	10	Cameron de Jong	6
Dean Joanisse	7	Cameron de Jong	9
Mitchell Kopytko	4	Rob Nobert	3
Rob Nobert	10

=== C event ===
Third knockout	Qualifier 3
Neil Dangerfield	6
Dean Joanisse	18	Dean Joanisse	4
Mitchell Kopytko	0	Neil Dangerfield	5
Cameron de Jong	8
Cameron de Jong	3
Tyler Tardi	8

Third knockout	Qualifier 4
Rob Nobert	9
Josh Kennelly	4	Sean Geall	2
Sean Geall	9	Rob Nobert	3
Sébastien Robillard	8
Sébastien Robillard	3
Jim Cotter	7

== Knockout results ==
All draw times listed in Pacific Time (UTC−08:00).

=== Draw 1 ===
Tuesday, January 4, 2:00 pm

Sheet A	1	2	3	4	5	6	7	8	9	10	Final
Paul Cseke 🔨	3	0	2	2	0	1	2	X	X	X	10
Mitchell Kopytko	0	2	0	0	1	0	0	X	X	X	3

Sheet C	1	2	3	4	5	6	7	8	9	10	Final
Jeff Richard 🔨	0	2	0	0	1	1	0	1	0	3	8
Josh Kennelly	1	0	0	3	0	0	1	0	1	0	6

Sheet D	1	2	3	4	5	6	7	8	9	10	11	Final
Cameron de Jong	0	0	0	1	0	0	1	1	0	2	0	5
Sean Geall 🔨	0	0	2	0	2	0	0	0	1	0	1	6

Sheet E	1	2	3	4	5	6	7	8	9	10	Final
Dean Joanisse	0	2	3	0	0	0	0	2	0	3	10
Neil Dangerfield 🔨	0	0	0	2	1	1	2	0	1	0	7

=== Draw 2 ===
Tuesday, January 4, 7:00 pm

Sheet B	1	2	3	4	5	6	7	8	9	10	Final
Rob Nobert 🔨	0	0	0	0	0	1	0	0	X	X	1
Jeff Richard	1	0	1	1	2	0	0	2	X	X	7

Sheet D	1	2	3	4	5	6	7	8	9	10	Final
Sébastien Robillard 🔨	4	2	0	2	0	2	X	X	X	X	10
Dean Joanisse	0	0	3	0	1	0	X	X	X	X	4

Sheet E	1	2	3	4	5	6	7	8	9	10	Final
Tyler Tardi	0	2	1	0	0	3	0	0	0	1	7
Sean Geall 🔨	1	0	0	2	0	0	1	1	1	0	6

Sheet F	1	2	3	4	5	6	7	8	9	10	Final
Jim Cotter 🔨	0	3	0	1	1	0	0	1	0	2	8
Paul Cseke	3	0	1	0	0	1	1	0	3	0	9

=== Draw 4 ===
Wednesday, January 5, 2:00 pm

Sheet A	1	2	3	4	5	6	7	8	9	10	Final
Josh Kennelly 🔨	1	1	0	0	0	X	X	X	X	X	2
Jim Cotter	0	0	2	4	5	X	X	X	X	X	11

Sheet B	1	2	3	4	5	6	7	8	9	10	Final
Cameron de Jong 🔨	2	0	0	1	0	3	0	4	0	X	10
Dean Joanisse	0	1	0	0	2	0	2	0	2	X	7

Sheet C	1	2	3	4	5	6	7	8	9	10	11	Final
Neil Dangerfield	1	0	1	0	1	1	1	1	0	0	1	7
Sean Geall 🔨	0	3	0	2	0	0	0	0	0	1	0	6

Sheet F	1	2	3	4	5	6	7	8	9	10	Final
Mitchell Kopytko	1	0	1	0	1	0	1	0	0	X	4
Rob Nobert 🔨	0	3	0	2	0	1	0	2	2	X	10

=== Draw 5 ===
Wednesday, January 5, 7:00 pm

Sheet A	1	2	3	4	5	6	7	8	9	10	Final
Cameron de Jong	3	0	2	0	3	1	X	X	X	X	9
Rob Nobert 🔨	0	2	0	1	0	0	X	X	X	X	3

Sheet B	1	2	3	4	5	6	7	8	9	10	Final
Jim Cotter 🔨	3	1	0	2	2	X	X	X	X	X	8
Neil Dangerfield	0	0	1	0	0	X	X	X	X	X	1

Sheet C	1	2	3	4	5	6	7	8	9	10	Final
Tyler Tardi	0	1	0	1	0	2	0	2	0	X	6
Paul Cseke 🔨	2	0	2	0	2	0	1	0	3	X	10

Sheet F	1	2	3	4	5	6	7	8	9	10	Final
Jeff Richard	1	0	2	4	2	X	X	X	X	X	9
Sébastien Robillard 🔨	0	2	0	0	0	X	X	X	X	X	2

=== Draw 6 ===
Thursday, January 6, 9:00 am

Sheet B	1	2	3	4	5	6	7	8	9	10	Final
Josh Kennelly 🔨	0	1	0	1	0	0	2	0	0	X	4
Sean Geall	1	0	1	0	2	2	0	2	1	X	9

Sheet E	1	2	3	4	5	6	7	8	9	10	Final
Dean Joanisse 🔨	5	2	6	1	4	X	X	X	X	X	18
Mitchell Kopytko	0	0	0	0	0	X	X	X	X	X	0

=== Draw 7 ===
Thursday, January 6, 2:00 pm

Sheet A	1	2	3	4	5	6	7	8	9	10	Final
Neil Dangerfield	1	0	0	0	2	1	1	0	1	X	6
Dean Joanisse 🔨	0	0	2	1	0	0	0	1	0	X	4

Sheet C	1	2	3	4	5	6	7	8	9	10	Final
Sébastien Robillard	0	2	0	0	2	0	0	0	0	0	4
Jim Cotter 🔨	1	0	2	0	0	0	1	1	0	3	8

Sheet D	1	2	3	4	5	6	7	8	9	10	Final
Paul Cseke 🔨	1	1	0	1	2	3	X	X	X	X	8
Jeff Richard	0	0	2	0	0	0	X	X	X	X	2

Sheet E	1	2	3	4	5	6	7	8	9	10	Final
Tyler Tardi	2	0	0	0	2	0	1	3	0	X	8
Cameron de Jong 🔨	0	2	0	1	0	2	0	0	1	X	6

Sheet F	1	2	3	4	5	6	7	8	9	10	Final
Rob Nobert	2	0	3	1	2	1	X	X	X	X	9
Sean Geall 🔨	0	2	0	0	0	0	X	X	X	X	2

=== Draw 8 ===
Thursday, January 6, 7:00 pm

Sheet B	1	2	3	4	5	6	7	8	9	10	Final
Neil Dangerfield	2	0	2	0	1	0	0	0	0	0	5
Cameron de Jong 🔨	0	1	0	3	0	1	0	1	0	2	8

Sheet D	1	2	3	4	5	6	7	8	9	10	Final
Jim Cotter 🔨	1	0	4	0	2	0	0	X	X	X	7
Tyler Tardi	0	0	0	1	0	2	0	X	X	X	3

=== Draw 9 ===
Friday, January 7, 9:00 am

Sheet B	1	2	3	4	5	6	7	8	9	10	Final
Jeff Richard 🔨	1	0	2	1	0	1	0	1	0	1	7
Jim Cotter	0	2	0	0	1	0	2	0	1	0	6

Sheet D	1	2	3	4	5	6	7	8	9	10	Final
Rob Nobert	0	1	0	0	0	0	2	0	X	X	3
Sébastien Robillard 🔨	2	0	2	0	1	1	0	2	X	X	8

Sheet F	1	2	3	4	5	6	7	8	9	10	Final
Cameron de Jong	0	0	1	0	0	1	1	0	0	X	3
Tyler Tardi 🔨	0	1	0	3	0	0	0	3	1	X	8

=== Draw 10 ===
Friday, January 7, 2:00 pm

Sheet E	1	2	3	4	5	6	7	8	9	10	Final
Sébastien Robillard	0	0	0	2	0	1	0	0	X	X	3
Jim Cotter 🔨	2	0	1	0	2	0	1	1	X	X	7

== Playoffs ==
Page playoff system
A	Paul Cseke	7
B	Jeff Richard	6
C1	Tyler Tardi	3
C2	Jim Cotter	9

Semifinal
B	Jeff Richard	7
C2	Jim Cotter	5

Final
A	Paul Cseke	8
B	Jeff Richard	11

=== A vs. B ===
Saturday, January 8, 9:00 am

Sheet E	1	2	3	4	5	6	7	8	9	10	Final
Paul Cseke	0	1	0	2	0	1	0	2	0	1	7
Jeff Richard 🔨	1	0	1	0	0	0	2	0	2	0	6

=== C1 vs. C2 ===
Saturday, January 8, 9:00 am

Sheet D	1	2	3	4	5	6	7	8	9	10	Final
Tyler Tardi	0	0	0	2	0	1	0	0	X	X	3
Jim Cotter 🔨	1	3	1	0	1	0	2	1	X	X	9

=== Semifinal ===
Saturday, January 8, 7:00 pm

Sheet E	1	2	3	4	5	6	7	8	9	10	Final
Jeff Richard 🔨	1	0	0	3	0	0	0	2	0	1	7
Jim Cotter	0	2	1	0	0	0	0	0	2	0	5

=== Final ===
Sunday, January 9, 2:00 pm

Sheet E	1	2	3	4	5	6	7	8	9	10	11	Final
Paul Cseke 🔨	1	0	2	0	0	1	1	2	0	1	0	8
Jeff Richard	0	3	0	2	1	0	0	0	2	0	3	11

2022 BC Men's Curling Championship

Jeff Richard
3rd British Columbia Provincial Championship title
