= 2018 belairdirect BC Men's Curling Championship =

- Host city: Parksville, British Columbia
- Arena: Parksville Curling Club
- Dates: January 30-February 4
- Winner: Sean Geall
- Curling club: Kelowna Curling Club
- Skip: Sean Geall
- Third: Jeff Richard
- Second: Andrew Nerpin
- Lead: David Harper
- Finalist: Jim Cotter

The 2018 belairdirect BC Men's Curling Championship was held from January 30 to February 4 at the Parksville Curling Club in Parksville, British Columbia. The winning Sean Geall rink represented British Columbia at the 2018 Tim Hortons Brier in Regina, Saskatchewan.

== Teams ==
The teams are listed as follows:

Skip	Third	Second	Lead	Alternate	Locale(s)
Chris Baier	Adam Cseke	Matt Tolley	Cal Jackson	Will Sutton	Kelowna Curling Club, Kelowna
Jim Cotter	Catlin Schneider	Tyrel Griffith	Rick Sawatsky		Vernon Curling Club, Vernon
Wes Craig	Gerald Poelman	Tony Anslow	Victor Gamble		Victoria Curling Club, Victoria
Grant Dezura	Brendan Willis	Bryan Kedziora	Mitch Young		Golden Ears Curling Club, Maple Ridge
Wylie Eden	Sean Matheson	Jason Larence	Tyler Jaeger		Penticton Curling Club, Penticton
Sean Geall	Jeff Richard	Andrew Nerpin	David Harper		Kelowna Curling Club, Kelowna
Glen Jackson	Andrew Komlodi	Corey Chester	Joel Cave	Alex Horvath	Victoria Curling Club, Victoria
Dean Joanisse	Paul Cseke	Jay Wakefield	John Cullen	Steve Petryk	Golden Ears Curling Club, Maple Ridge
Mark Longworth	Michael Longworth	Rob Nobert	John Slattery	Aron Herrick	Vernon Curling Club, Vernon
Chris Medford	Steve Tersmette	Josh Firman	Jeff Langin		Cranbrook Curling Centre, Cranbrook
Jason Montgomery	Cam de Jong	Miles Craig	Will Duggan	Paul Henderson	Victoria Curling Club, Victoria
Brent Pierce	Andrew Bilesky	Steve Kopf	Rhys Gamache	Matthew McCrady	Royal City Curling Club, New Westminster

== Knockout Draw Brackets ==
The draw is listed as follows:

=== A Event ===
First Knockout
Mark Longworth	7
Grant Dezura	9
Jason Montgomery	6
Chris Medford	5
Chris Baier	2
Wes Craig	10
Glen Jackson	5
Wylie Eden	4

Quarterfinals
Jim Cotter	6
Grant Dezura	2
Brent Pierce	5
Jason Montgomery	7
Sean Geall	7
Wes Craig	3
Dean Joanisse	8
Glen Jackson	7

Semifinals
Jim Cotter	9
Jason Montgomery	7
Sean Geall	7
Dean Joanisse	5

Qualifier 1
Jim Cotter	7
Sean Geall	6

=== B Event ===
Second Knockout
Brent Pierce	9
Chris Baier	5
Grant Dezura	7
Wylie Eden	4
Glen Jackson	6
Mark Longworth	5
Wes Craig	6
Chris Medford	2

Quarterfinals
Brent Pierce	8
Jason Montgomery	6
Grant Dezura	8
Dean Joanisse	10
Glen Jackson	6
Wes Craig	1

Semifinals
Brent Pierce	8
Dean Joanisse	7
Glen Jackson	2
Sean Geall	4

Qualifier 2
Brent Pierce	3
Sean Geall	8

=== C Event ===
C1 knockout		Semifinals		Finals
		Chris Baier	4
Mark Longworth	3	Glen Jackson	5
Chris Baier	7			Glen Jackson	7
				Dean Joanisse	10
		Dean Joanisse	11
		Wes Craig	7

C2 knockout
Wylie Eden	9
Chris Medford	1

Quarterfinals
Wylie Eden	5
Jason Montgomery	8

Semifinals
Jason Montgomery	9
Grant Dezura	7

Finals
Jason Montgomery	7
Brent Pierce	6

== Playoffs ==
Page playoff system
A	Jim Cotter	6
B	Sean Geall	2
C1	Dean Joanisse	4
C2	Jason Montgomery	7

Semifinal
B	Sean Geall	6
C2	Jason Montgomery	5

Final
A	Jim Cotter	7
B	Sean Geall	9

=== A vs. B ===
Saturday, February 3, 2:00 pm

Team	1	2	3	4	5	6	7	8	9	10	Final
Jim Cotter	3	1	0	0	0	0	2	0	X	X	6
Sean Geall	0	0	0	0	1	0	0	1	X	X	2

=== C1 vs. C2 ===
Saturday, February 3, 7:00 pm

Team	1	2	3	4	5	6	7	8	9	10	Final
Dean Joanisse	0	0	1	0	0	1	0	2	0	X	4
Jason Montgomery	1	0	0	1	2	0	2	0	1	X	7

=== Semifinal ===
Sunday, February 4, 11:00 am

Team	1	2	3	4	5	6	7	8	9	10	Final
Sean Geall	0	2	0	1	0	0	1	2	0	0	6
Jason Montgomery	0	0	3	0	1	0	0	0	1	0	5

=== Final ===
Sunday, February 4, 4:00 pm

Team	1	2	3	4	5	6	7	8	9	10	11	Final
Jim Cotter	0	1	0	2	0	1	0	2	0	1	0	7
Sean Geall	0	0	1	0	2	0	1	0	3	0	2	9

2018 BelairDirect BC Men's Championship

Sean Geall
2nd British Columbia Provincial Championship title
