= 2019 BC Men's Curling Championship =

2019 BC Men's Curling Championship presented by Barkerville Historic Town & Park and Nufloors
- Host city: Quesnel, British Columbia
- Arena: West Fraser Centre
- Dates: January 29–February 3
- Winner: Team Cotter
- Curling club: Kelowna CC & Vernon CC
- Skip: Jim Cotter
- Third: Steve Laycock
- Second: Tyrel Griffith
- Lead: Rick Sawatsky
- Finalist: Jason Montgomery

The 2019 BC Men's Curling Championship presented by Barkerville Historic Town & Park and Nufloors the provincial men's curling championship for British Columbia, was held January 29 to February 3 at the West Fraser Centre in Quesnel. The winning Jim Cotter team represented British Columbia at the 2019 Tim Hortons Brier in Brandon, Manitoba.

== Qualification ==
| Qualification method | Berths | Qualifying team(s) |
|---|---|---|
| Defending champion | 1 | Sean Geall |
| CTRS leader | 1 | Jim Cotter |
| BC Tour | 2 | Josh Barry; Tyler Tardi |
| Kootenays playdown | 1 | Deane Horning |
| Lower Mainland playdown | 3 | Daniel Wenzek; Dean Joanisse; Tyler Klymchuk |
| Okanagan playdown | 1 | Wylie Eden |
| Island playdown | 1 | Matthew Blandford |
| Northern playdown | 1 | Brady Waffle |
| Open playdown | 1 | Jason Montgomery |

== Teams ==
The teams are listed as follows:

| Skip | Third | Second | Lead | Club(s) |
|---|---|---|---|---|
| Josh Barry | Sebastien Robillard | Jay Wakefield | John Cullen | Golden Ears |
| Matthew Blandford | Chris Baier | Derek Ryan | Cal Jackson | Victoria |
| Jim Cotter | Steve Laycock | Tyrel Griffith | Rick Sawatsky | Kelowna/Vernon |
| Wylie Eden | Sean Matheson | Justin Hillson | Tyler Jaeger | Kelowna |
| Sean Geall | Jeff Richard | Andrew Nerpin | David Harper | Abbotsford |
| Deane Horning | Travis Cameron | Dave Toffolo | James McKenzie | Castlegar |
| Dean Joanisse | Andrew Bilesky | Steve Kopf | Paul Cseke | Golden Ears/Royal City/Victoria |
| Tyler Klymchuk | Corey Chester | Kyle Habkirk | Rhys Gamache | Royal City/Kamloops/Victoria |
| Jason Montgomery | Cameron de Jong | Miles Craig | Will Duggan | Victoria |
| Tyler Tardi | Sterling Middleton | Matthew Hall | Alex Horvath | Langley/Victoria |
| Brady Waffle | Eric Eriksson | Mike Pagurut | Dave Vatamaniuck | Quesnel |
| Daniel Wenzek | Jared Kolomaya | Jordan Tardi | Nicholas Meister | Langley/Royal City/Kamloops |

== Knockout brackets ==
The draw is listed as follows:

=== A Event ===
First knockout
Jason Montgomery | 12
Tyler Klymchuk | 5
Daniel Wenzek | 12
Brady Waffle | 2
Matthew Blandford | 5
Deane Horning | 4
Dean Joanisse | 10
Wylie Eden | 5

Quarterfinals
Sean Geall | 2
Jason Montgomery | 9
Tyler Tardi | 8
Daniel Wenzek | 5
Jim Cotter | 9
Matthew Blandford | 2
Josh Barry | 2
Dean Joanisse | 9

Semifinals
Jason Montgomery | 7
Tyler Tardi | 4
Jim Cotter | 4
Dean Joanisse | 2

Qualifier A
Jason Montgomery | 5
Jim Cotter | 7

=== B Event ===
Second knockout
Tyler Klymchuk | 6
Josh Barry | 8
Brady Waffle | 4
Matthew Blandford | 9
Deane Horning | 2
Daniel Wenzek | 8
Wylie Eden | 1
Sean Geall | 7

Quarterfinals
Josh Barry | 3
Matthew Blandford | 5
Dean Joanisse | 7
Daniel Wenzek | 5
Tyler Tardi | 7
Sean Geall | 1

Semifinals
Matthew Blandford | 3
Jason Montgomery | 8
Dean Joanisse | 8
Tyler Tardi | 7

Qualifier B
Jason Montgomery | 10
Dean Joanisse | 5

=== C Event ===
| Third knockout | | Semifinals | | Qualifier C1 |
| | | | | Dean Joanisse | 7 |
| Wylie Eden | 7 | | | Daniel Wenzek | 10 |
| Deane Horning | 4 | Wylie Eden | 5 |
| Tyler Klymchuk | 3 | Daniel Wenzek | 9 |
| Daniel Wenzek | 9 |

| Third knockout | | Semifinals | | Qualifier C2 |
| | | Sean Geall | 2 |
| Sean Geall | 9 | Matthew Blandford | 7 |
| Brady Waffle | 3 | | | Matthew Blandford | 3 |
| | | | | Josh Barry | 9 |
| | | Tyler Tardi | 4 |
| | | Josh Barry | 7 |

== Playoffs ==
Page playoff system
A | Jim Cotter | 9
B | Jason Montgomery | 3
C1 | Daniel Wenzek | 5
C2 | Josh Barry | 8

Semifinal
B | Jason Montgomery | 11
C2 | Josh Barry | 5

Final
A | Jim Cotter | 9
B | Jason Montgomery | 4

=== 1 vs. 2 ===
February 2, 9:00am

| Sheet D | 1 | 2 | 3 | 4 | 5 | 6 | 7 | 8 | 9 | 10 | Final |
|---|---|---|---|---|---|---|---|---|---|---|---|
| Jim Cotter | 2 | 0 | 2 | 0 | 2 | 1 | 0 | 2 | X | X | 9 |
| Jason Montgomery | 0 | 1 | 0 | 1 | 0 | 0 | 1 | 0 | X | X | 3 |

=== 3 vs. 4 ===
February 2, 2:00pm

| Sheet B | 1 | 2 | 3 | 4 | 5 | 6 | 7 | 8 | 9 | 10 | Final |
|---|---|---|---|---|---|---|---|---|---|---|---|
| Daniel Wenzek | 0 | 2 | 0 | 2 | 0 | 0 | 1 | 0 | 0 | X | 5 |
| Josh Barry | 1 | 0 | 0 | 0 | 3 | 0 | 0 | 2 | 2 | X | 8 |

=== Semifinal ===
February 2, 7:00pm

| Sheet D | 1 | 2 | 3 | 4 | 5 | 6 | 7 | 8 | 9 | 10 | Final |
|---|---|---|---|---|---|---|---|---|---|---|---|
| Jason Montgomery | 3 | 0 | 1 | 1 | 0 | 4 | 2 | 0 | X | X | 11 |
| Josh Barry | 0 | 2 | 0 | 0 | 1 | 0 | 0 | 2 | X | X | 5 |

=== Final ===
February 3, 10:00am

| Sheet D | 1 | 2 | 3 | 4 | 5 | 6 | 7 | 8 | 9 | 10 | Final |
|---|---|---|---|---|---|---|---|---|---|---|---|
| Jim Cotter | 2 | 0 | 2 | 2 | 0 | 0 | 0 | 0 | 3 | X | 9 |
| Jason Montgomery | 0 | 1 | 0 | 0 | 0 | 1 | 1 | 1 | 0 | X | 4 |

2019 BC Men's Championship

Jim Cotter
8th British Columbia Provincial Championship title
