= 2014 Canadian Open of Curling =

Grand Slam of Curling event

- Host city: Yorkton, Saskatchewan
- Arena: Gallagher Centre
- Dates: December 9–14
- Men's winner: (Newfoundland and Labrador) Brad Gushue
- Curling club: Bally Haly G&CC, St. John's
- Skip: Brad Gushue
- Third: Mark Nichols
- Second: Brett Gallant
- Lead: Geoff Walker
- Finalist: (Saskatchewan) Steve Laycock
- Women's winner: (Scotland) Eve Muirhead
- Curling club: Dunkeld CC, Pitlochry
- Skip: Eve Muirhead
- Third: Anna Sloan
- Second: Vicki Adams
- Lead: Sarah Reid
- Finalist: (Ontario) Rachel Homan

The 2014 Canadian Open of Curling was held from December 9 to 14 at the Gallagher Centre in Yorkton, Saskatchewan. The Canadian Open was the third men's Grand Slam and the fourth women's Grand Slam of the 2014–15 curling season.

== Men ==
=== Teams ===
The teams are listed as follows:

Skip	Third	Second	Lead	Locale
Brendan Bottcher	Tom Appelman	Bradley Thiessen	Karrick Martin	Edmonton, Alberta
Reid Carruthers	Braeden Moskowy	Derek Samagalski	Colin Hodgson	Winnipeg, Manitoba
Adam Casey	Josh Barry	Anson Carmody	Robbie Doherty	Charlottetown, Prince Edward Island
Jim Cotter	Ryan Kuhn	Tyrel Griffith	Rick Sawatsky	Kelowna/Vernon, British Columbia
Niklas Edin	Oskar Eriksson	Kristian Lindström	Christoffer Sundgren	Karlstad, Sweden
John Epping	Travis Fanset	Patrick Janssen	Tim March	Toronto, Ontario
Brad Gushue	Mark Nichols	Brett Gallant	Geoff Walker	St. John's, Newfoundland and Labrador
Glenn Howard	Richard Hart	Jon Mead	Craig Savill	Penetanguishene, Ontario
Brad Jacobs	Ryan Fry	E. J. Harnden	Ryan Harnden	Sault Ste. Marie, Ontario
Kevin Koe	Marc Kennedy	Brent Laing	Ben Hebert	Calgary, Alberta
Steve Laycock	Kirk Muyres	Colton Flasch	Dallan Muyres	Saskatoon, Saskatchewan
Mike McEwen	B. J. Neufeld	Matt Wozniak	Denni Neufeld	Winnipeg, Manitoba
Sven Michel	Florian Meister	Simon Gempeler	Stefan Meienberg	Adelboden, Switzerland
John Morris	Pat Simmons	Scott Bailey	Nolan Thiessen	Calgary, Alberta
David Murdoch	Greg Drummond	Scott Andrews	Michael Goodfellow	Stirling, Scotland
Jeff Stoughton	Rob Fowler	Alex Forrest	Connor Njegovan	Winnipeg, Manitoba

=== Knockout results ===
The draw is listed as follows:

==== A event ====
First Knockout		Semifinals		Qualifier 1
(Ontario) Brad Jacobs	3
(Alberta) Brendan Bottcher	8	(Alberta) Brendan Bottcher	7
(Ontario) John Epping	8	(Ontario) John Epping	1
(Scotland) David Murdoch	4			(Alberta) Brendan Bottcher	3
(Alberta) Kevin Koe	7			(Alberta) Kevin Koe	7
(Manitoba) Reid Carruthers	6	(Alberta) Kevin Koe	5
(Alberta) John Morris	7	(Alberta) John Morris	4
(Manitoba) Jeff Stoughton	3

First Knockout		Semifinals		Qualifier 2
(Manitoba) Mike McEwen	7
(Prince Edward Island) Adam Casey	6	(Manitoba) Mike McEwen	8
(Sweden) Niklas Edin	5	(Saskatchewan) Steve Laycock	3
(Saskatchewan) Steve Laycock	8			(Manitoba) Mike McEwen	7
(Newfoundland and Labrador) Brad Gushue	7			(Newfoundland and Labrador) Brad Gushue	3
(British Columbia) Jim Cotter	6	(Newfoundland and Labrador) Brad Gushue	6
(Ontario) Glenn Howard	6	(Ontario) Glenn Howard	3
(Switzerland) Sven Michel	3

==== B event ====
Second Knockout		Semifinals		Qualifier 3
(Ontario) Brad Jacobs	5
(Scotland) David Murdoch	3	(Ontario) Brad Jacobs	12
(Manitoba) Reid Carruthers	6	(Manitoba) Reid Carruthers	7
(Manitoba) Jeff Stoughton	5			(Ontario) Brad Jacobs	7
				(Newfoundland and Labrador) Brad Gushue	3

Second Knockout		Semifinals		Qualifier 4
(Prince Edward Island) Adam Casey	6
(Sweden) Niklas Edin	7	(Sweden) Niklas Edin	6
(British Columbia) Jim Cotter	8	(British Columbia) Jim Cotter	7
(Switzerland) Sven Michel	3			(British Columbia) Jim Cotter	8
				(Alberta) Brendan Bottcher	3

Second Knockout		Qualifier 5
(Ontario) John Epping	8
(Alberta) John Morris	4	(Ontario) John Epping	4
(Saskatchewan) Steve Laycock	6	(Saskatchewan) Steve Laycock	6
(Ontario) Glenn Howard	4

==== C event ====
Third Knockout		Semifinals		Qualifier 6
(Scotland) David Murdoch	8
(Manitoba) Jeff Stoughton	3	(Scotland) David Murdoch	5
		(Ontario) Glenn Howard	6
				(Ontario) Glenn Howard	2
				(Alberta) Brendan Bottcher	8

Third Knockout		Semifinals		Qualifier 7
(Prince Edward Island) Adam Casey	7
(Switzerland) Sven Michel	3	(Prince Edward Island) Adam Casey	5
		(Alberta) John Morris	7
				(Alberta) John Morris	4
				(Newfoundland and Labrador) Brad Gushue	6

Third Knockout		Qualifier 8
(Manitoba) Reid Carruthers	8
(Sweden) Niklas Edin	7	(Manitoba) Reid Carruthers	6
		(Ontario) John Epping	5

=== Knockout results ===
All times listed in Central Standard Time (UTC−6).

==== Draw 1 ====
Tuesday, December 9, 7:00 pm

Team	1	2	3	4	5	6	7	8	Final
(Ontario) John Epping	0	3	0	2	0	1	2	X	8
(Scotland) David Murdoch 🔨	1	0	1	0	2	0	0	X	4

Team	1	2	3	4	5	6	7	8	Final
(Sweden) Niklas Edin	0	2	0	2	0	0	1	X	5
(Saskatchewan) Steve Laycock 🔨	3	0	3	0	1	1	0	X	8

==== Draw 3 ====
Wednesday, December 10, 1:00 pm

Team	1	2	3	4	5	6	7	8	Final
(Ontario) Brad Jacobs 🔨	2	0	0	0	0	1	0	X	3
(Alberta) Brendan Bottcher	0	1	1	1	1	0	4	X	8

Team	1	2	3	4	5	6	7	8	Final
(Alberta) Kevin Koe	1	0	0	0	1	3	0	2	7
(Manitoba) Reid Carruthers 🔨	0	2	1	1	0	0	2	0	6

Team	1	2	3	4	5	6	7	8	Final
(Alberta) John Morris	0	2	0	1	0	4	X	X	7
(Manitoba) Jeff Stoughton 🔨	0	0	2	0	1	0	X	X	3

Team	1	2	3	4	5	6	7	8	Final
(Manitoba) Mike McEwen	0	0	2	0	2	1	0	2	7
(Prince Edward Island) Adam Casey 🔨	0	3	0	1	0	0	2	0	6

Team	1	2	3	4	5	6	7	8	Final
(Ontario) Glenn Howard 🔨	1	0	0	3	1	0	0	1	6
(Switzerland) Sven Michel	0	0	2	0	0	1	0	0	3

==== Draw 4 ====
Wednesday, December 10, 5:00 pm

Team	1	2	3	4	5	6	7	8	Final
(Newfoundland and Labrador) Brad Gushue 🔨	2	0	3	0	0	2	0	0	7
(British Columbia) Jim Cotter	0	2	0	1	0	0	2	1	6

==== Draw 5 ====
Wednesday, December 10, 8:30 pm

Team	1	2	3	4	5	6	7	8	Final
(Alberta) Brendan Bottcher 🔨	3	1	0	3	X	X	X	X	7
(Ontario) John Epping	0	0	1	0	X	X	X	X	1

Team	1	2	3	4	5	6	7	8	9	Final
(Alberta) Kevin Koe	0	1	1	0	0	1	0	1	1	5
(Alberta) John Morris 🔨	0	0	0	0	1	0	3	0	0	4

Team	1	2	3	4	5	6	7	8	Final
(Manitoba) Mike McEwen 🔨	2	0	2	0	3	1	X	X	8
(Saskatchewan) Steve Laycock	0	1	0	2	0	0	X	X	3

Team	1	2	3	4	5	6	7	8	Final
(Ontario) Brad Jacobs 🔨	0	2	0	1	0	1	0	1	5
(Scotland) David Murdoch	0	0	1	0	1	0	1	0	3

Team	1	2	3	4	5	6	7	8	Final
(Prince Edward Island) Adam Casey	0	3	0	1	0	0	2	0	6
(Sweden) Niklas Edin 🔨	1	0	2	0	2	1	0	1	7

==== Draw 7 ====
Thursday, December 11, 11:00 am

Team	1	2	3	4	5	6	7	8	Final
(Newfoundland and Labrador) Brad Gushue 🔨	0	1	0	2	0	2	0	1	6
(Ontario) Glenn Howard	0	0	1	0	1	0	1	0	3

Team	1	2	3	4	5	6	7	8	Final
(Alberta) Brendan Bottcher	0	0	0	2	0	1	0	X	3
(Alberta) Kevin Koe 🔨	1	1	1	0	2	0	2	X	7

Team	1	2	3	4	5	6	7	8	9	Final
(Manitoba) Reid Carruthers	1	0	0	2	0	1	1	0	1	6
(Manitoba) Jeff Stoughton 🔨	0	1	0	0	1	0	0	3	0	5

Team	1	2	3	4	5	6	7	8	Final
(British Columbia) Jim Cotter 🔨	1	0	2	0	0	5	X	X	8
(Switzerland) Sven Michel	0	1	0	2	0	0	X	X	3

Team	1	2	3	4	5	6	7	8	Final
(Ontario) John Epping	0	1	0	0	2	1	3	1	8
(Alberta) John Morris 🔨	1	0	1	2	0	0	0	0	4

==== Draw 9 ====
Thursday, December 11, 6:30 pm

Team	1	2	3	4	5	6	7	8	Final
(Manitoba) Mike McEwen	3	1	0	2	0	0	1	X	7
(Newfoundland and Labrador) Brad Gushue 🔨	0	0	2	0	0	1	0	X	3

Team	1	2	3	4	5	6	7	8	Final
(Ontario) Brad Jacobs 🔨	1	0	4	0	3	0	4	X	12
(Manitoba) Reid Carruthers	0	3	0	2	0	2	0	X	7

Team	1	2	3	4	5	6	7	8	Final
(Sweden) Niklas Edin 🔨	1	0	2	0	1	0	2	0	6
(British Columbia) Jim Cotter	0	1	0	1	0	3	0	2	7

Team	1	2	3	4	5	6	7	8	Final
(Saskatchewan) Steve Laycock 🔨	0	0	0	0	4	2	0	X	6
(Ontario) Glenn Howard	0	1	0	1	0	0	2	X	4

==== Draw 10 ====
Friday, December 12, 8:00 am

Team	1	2	3	4	5	6	7	8	Final
(Scotland) David Murdoch 🔨	1	0	2	2	0	3	X	X	8
(Manitoba) Jeff Stoughton	0	2	0	0	1	0	X	X	3

Team	1	2	3	4	5	6	7	8	Final
(Prince Edward Island) Adam Casey 🔨	0	1	0	3	0	2	1	X	7
(Switzerland) Sven Michel	0	0	2	0	1	0	0	X	3

==== Draw 11 ====
Friday, December 12, 11:00 am

Team	1	2	3	4	5	6	7	8	Final
(Ontario) John Epping 🔨	0	1	0	2	0	0	1	X	4
(Saskatchewan) Steve Laycock	0	0	2	0	2	2	0	X	6

Team	1	2	3	4	5	6	7	8	9	Final
(Manitoba) Reid Carruthers 🔨	1	0	2	0	1	0	3	0	1	8
(Sweden) Niklas Edin	0	1	0	3	0	1	0	2	0	7

==== Draw 12 ====
Friday, December 12, 2:30 pm

Team	1	2	3	4	5	6	7	8	Final
(Ontario) Brad Jacobs 🔨	1	0	2	0	1	2	1	X	7
(Newfoundland and Labrador) Brad Gushue	0	1	0	2	0	0	0	X	3

Team	1	2	3	4	5	6	7	8	Final
(British Columbia) Jim Cotter	0	0	1	1	1	0	5	X	8
(Alberta) Brendan Bottcher 🔨	0	2	0	0	0	1	0	X	3

==== Draw 13 ====
Friday, December 12, 6:30 pm

Team	1	2	3	4	5	6	7	8	Final
(Scotland) David Murdoch	0	1	1	0	2	0	0	1	5
(Ontario) Glenn Howard 🔨	3	0	0	1	0	1	1	0	6

Team	1	2	3	4	5	6	7	8	Final
(Prince Edward Island) Adam Casey 🔨	1	0	1	0	2	0	1	0	5
(Alberta) John Morris	0	1	0	2	0	3	0	1	7

==== Draw 14 ====
Saturday, December 13, 8:30 am

Team	1	2	3	4	5	6	7	8	Final
(Ontario) Glenn Howard	0	1	0	1	0	0	X	X	2
(Alberta) Brendan Bottcher 🔨	4	0	1	0	2	1	X	X	8

Team	1	2	3	4	5	6	7	8	Final
(Alberta) John Morris 🔨	0	2	1	0	0	1	0	X	4
(Newfoundland and Labrador) Brad Gushue	1	0	0	2	1	0	2	X	6

Team	1	2	3	4	5	6	7	8	Final
(Manitoba) Reid Carruthers 🔨	2	0	0	2	0	1	0	1	6
(Ontario) John Epping	0	0	1	0	1	0	3	0	5

=== Playoffs ===
Quarterfinals
(Manitoba) Mike McEwen	3
(Alberta) Brendan Bottcher	6
(Saskatchewan) Steve Laycock	6
(British Columbia) Jim Cotter	5
(Alberta) Kevin Koe	7
(Manitoba) Reid Carruthers	2
(Ontario) Brad Jacobs	5
(Newfoundland and Labrador) Brad Gushue	7

Semifinals
(Alberta) Brendan Bottcher	5
(Saskatchewan) Steve Laycock	6
(Alberta) Kevin Koe	4
(Newfoundland and Labrador) Brad Gushue	5

Final
(Saskatchewan) Steve Laycock	5
(Newfoundland and Labrador) Brad Gushue	6

==== Quarterfinals ====
Saturday, December 6, 12:00 pm

Team	1	2	3	4	5	6	7	8	Final
(Manitoba) Mike McEwen 🔨	0	0	2	0	1	0	0	X	3
(Alberta) Brendan Bottcher	0	0	0	2	0	4	0	X	6

Player percentages
(Manitoba) Team McEwen		(Alberta) Team Bottcher	
Denni Neufeld	95%	Karrick Martin	84%
Matt Wozniak	85%	Bradley Thiessen	87%
B. J. Neufeld	80%	Tom Appelman	85%
Mike McEwen	94%	Brendan Bottcher	90%
Total	88%	Total	86%

Team	1	2	3	4	5	6	7	8	Final
(Saskatchewan) Steve Laycock 🔨	2	0	0	2	0	1	0	1	6
(British Columbia) Jim Cotter	0	0	1	0	2	0	2	0	5

Player percentages
(Saskatchewan) Team Laycock		(British Columbia) Team Cotter	
Dallan Muyres	95%	Rick Sawatsky	92%
Colton Flasch	91%	Tyrel Griffith	80%
Kirk Muyres	85%	Ryan Kuhn	91%
Steve Laycock	93%	Jim Cotter	93%
Total	91%	Total	89%

Team	1	2	3	4	5	6	7	8	Final
(Alberta) Kevin Koe 🔨	0	0	2	0	0	0	5	X	7
(Manitoba) Reid Carruthers	0	0	0	1	0	1	0	X	2

Player percentages
(Alberta) Team Koe		(Manitoba) Team Carruthers	
Ben Hebert	98%	Colin Hodgson	90%
Brent Laing	95%	Derek Samagalski	93%
Marc Kennedy	100%	Braeden Moskowy	86%
Kevin Koe	91%	Reid Carruthers	94%
Total	96%	Total	91%

Team	1	2	3	4	5	6	7	8	Final
(Ontario) Brad Jacobs 🔨	2	0	2	0	0	1	0	0	5
(Newfoundland and Labrador) Brad Gushue	0	2	0	2	0	0	0	3	7

Player percentages
(Ontario) Team Jacobs		(Newfoundland and Labrador) Team Gushue	
Ryan Harnden	96%	Geoff Walker	95%
E. J. Harnden	83%	Brett Gallant	77%
Ryan Fry	89%	Mark Nichols	76%
Brad Jacobs	65%	Brad Gushue	84%
Total	83%	Total	83%

==== Semifinals ====
Saturday, December 6, 8:30 pm

Team	1	2	3	4	5	6	7	8	Final
(Alberta) Brendan Bottcher	0	0	2	0	0	2	1	0	5
(Saskatchewan) Steve Laycock 🔨	0	2	0	0	3	0	0	1	6

Player percentages
(Alberta) Team Bottcher		(Saskatchewan) Team Laycock	
Karrick Martin	93%	Dallan Muyres	93%
Bradley Thiessen	86%	Colton Flasch	87%
Tom Appelman	92%	Kirk Muyres	80%
Brendan Bottcher	80%	Steve Laycock	88%
Total	88%	Total	87%

Team	1	2	3	4	5	6	7	8	Final
(Alberta) Kevin Koe 🔨	0	2	1	0	0	1	0	0	4
(Newfoundland and Labrador) Brad Gushue	0	0	0	2	0	0	2	1	5

Player percentages
(Alberta) Team Koe		(Newfoundland and Labrador) Team Gushue	
Ben Hebert	88%	Geoff Walker	100%
Brent Laing	85%	Brett Gallant	78%
Marc Kennedy	76%	Mark Nichols	74%
Kevin Koe	81%	Brad Gushue	94%
Total	82%	Total	86%

==== Final ====
Sunday, December 7, 12:00 pm

Team	1	2	3	4	5	6	7	8	Final
(Saskatchewan) Steve Laycock 🔨	2	0	1	1	0	0	1	0	5
(Newfoundland and Labrador) Brad Gushue	0	2	0	0	2	0	0	2	6

Player percentages
(Saskatchewan) Team Laycock		(Newfoundland and Labrador) Team Gushue	
Dallan Muyres	85%	Geoff Walker	86%
Colton Flasch	81%	Brett Gallant	89%
Kirk Muyres	73%	Mark Nichols	61%
Steve Laycock	77%	Brad Gushue	82%
Total	79%	Total	80%

== Women ==
=== Teams ===
The teams are listed as follows:

Skip	Third	Second	Lead	Locale
Chelsea Carey	Laura Crocker	Taylor McDonald	Jen Gates	Edmonton, Alberta
Chantelle Eberle	Cindy Ricci	Larisa Murray	Debbie Lozinski	Regina, Saskatchewan
Binia Feltscher	Irene Schori	Franziska Kaufmann	Christine Urech	Flims, Switzerland
Allison Flaxey	Katie Cottrill	Kristen Foster	Morgan Court	Listowel, Ontario
Julie Hastings	Christy Trombley	Stacey Smith	Katrina Collins	Thornhill, Ontario
Amber Holland	Cathy Overton-Clapham	Sasha Carter	Chelsey Matson	Regina, Saskatchewan
Rachel Homan	Emma Miskew	Joanne Courtney	Lisa Weagle	Ottawa, Ontario
Jennifer Jones	Kaitlyn Lawes	Jill Officer	Dawn McEwen	Winnipeg, Manitoba
Kristy McDonald	Kate Cameron	Leslie Wilson-Westcott	Raunora Westcott	Winnipeg, Manitoba
Sherry Middaugh	Jo-Ann Rizzo	Lee Merklinger	Leigh Armstrong	Coldwater, Ontario
Eve Muirhead	Anna Sloan	Vicki Adams	Sarah Reid	Stirling, Scotland
Heather Nedohin	Amy Nixon	Jessica Mair	Laine Peters	Edmonton, Alberta
Nina Roth	Jamie Sinclair	Becca Hamilton	Tabitha Peterson	(United States) Blaine, Minnesota
Valerie Sweeting	Lori Olson-Johns	Dana Ferguson	Rachelle Brown	Edmonton, Alberta
Jill Thurston	Brette Richards	Briane Meilleur	Blaine de Jager	Winnipeg, Manitoba
Silvana Tirinzoni	Manuela Siegrist	Esther Neuenschwander	Marlene Albrecht	Aarau, Switzerland

=== Knockout results ===
The draw is listed as follows:

==== A event ====
First Knockout		Semifinals		Qualifier 1
(Manitoba) Jennifer Jones	6
(United States) Nina Roth	4	(Manitoba) Jennifer Jones	6
(Alberta) Heather Nedohin	7	(Alberta) Heather Nedohin	7
(Manitoba) Jill Thurston	6			(Alberta) Heather Nedohin	3
(Switzerland) Silvana Tirinzoni	8			(Alberta) Valerie Sweeting	5
(Alberta) Chelsea Carey	4	(Switzerland) Silvana Tirinzoni	4
(Alberta) Valerie Sweeting	7	(Alberta) Valerie Sweeting	6
(Ontario) Allison Flaxey	6

First Knockout		Semifinals		Qualifier 2
(Ontario) Rachel Homan	9
(Saskatchewan) Amber Holland	2	(Ontario) Rachel Homan	8
(Ontario) Sherry Middaugh	2	(Ontario) Julie Hastings	1
(Ontario) Julie Hastings	5			(Ontario) Rachel Homan	8
(Scotland) Eve Muirhead	7			(Manitoba) Kristy McDonald	7
(Saskatchewan) Chantelle Eberle	2	(Scotland) Eve Muirhead	2
(Switzerland) Binia Feltscher	5	(Manitoba) Kristy McDonald	7
(Manitoba) Kristy McDonald	6

==== B event ====
Second Knockout		Semifinals		Qualifier 3
(United States) Nina Roth	6
(Manitoba) Jill Thurston	10	(Manitoba) Jill Thurston	2
(Alberta) Chelsea Carey	7	(Alberta) Chelsea Carey	7
(Ontario) Allison Flaxey	6			(Alberta) Chelsea Carey	9
				(Manitoba) Kristy McDonald	7

Second Knockout		Semifinals		Qualifier 4
(Saskatchewan) Amber Holland	7
(Ontario) Sherry Middaugh	3	(Saskatchewan) Amber Holland	4
(Saskatchewan) Chantelle Eberle	4	(Switzerland) Binia Feltscher	5
(Switzerland) Binia Feltscher	8			(Switzerland) Binia Feltscher	3
				(Alberta) Heather Nedohin	5

Second Knockout		Qualifier 5
(Manitoba) Jennifer Jones	10
(Switzerland) Silvana Tirinzoni	8	(Manitoba) Jennifer Jones	2
(Ontario) Julie Hastings	4	(Scotland) Eve Muirhead	8
(Scotland) Eve Muirhead	6

==== C event ====
Third Knockout		Semifinals		Qualifier 6
(United States) Nina Roth	10
(Ontario) Allison Flaxey	6	(United States) Nina Roth	10
		(Ontario) Julie Hastings	6
				(United States) Nina Roth	4
				(Switzerland) Binia Feltscher	5

Third Knockout		Semifinals		Qualifier 7
(Ontario) Sherry Middaugh	7
(Saskatchewan) Chantelle Eberle	5	(Ontario) Sherry Middaugh	8
		(Switzerland) Silvana Tirinzoni	1
				(Ontario) Sherry Middaugh	6
				(Ontario) Kristy McDonald	3

Third Knockout		Qualifier 8
(Manitoba) Jill Thurston	9
(Saskatchewan) Amber Holland	6	(Manitoba) Jill Thurston	2
		(Manitoba) Jennifer Jones	6

=== Knockout results ===
All times listed in Central Standard Time (UTC−6).

==== Draw 1 ====
Tuesday, December 9, 7:00 pm

Team	1	2	3	4	5	6	7	8	Final
(Switzerland) Silvana Tirinzoni	0	2	0	2	0	3	1	X	8
(Alberta) Chelsea Carey 🔨	2	0	1	0	1	0	0	X	4

Team	1	2	3	4	5	6	7	8	Final
(Scotland) Eve Muirhead	2	0	0	1	0	0	1	3	7
(Saskatchewan) Chantelle Eberle 🔨	0	0	1	0	1	0	0	0	2

Team	1	2	3	4	5	6	7	8	9	Final
(Switzerland) Binia Feltscher 🔨	2	0	0	1	0	0	1	1	0	5
(Manitoba) Kristy McDonald	0	2	1	0	1	1	0	0	1	6

==== Draw 2 ====
Wednesday, December 10, 9:30 am

Team	1	2	3	4	5	6	7	8	Final
(Manitoba) Jennifer Jones	1	1	0	2	0	1	1	0	6
(United States) Nina Roth 🔨	0	0	2	0	1	0	0	1	4

Team	1	2	3	4	5	6	7	8	Final
(Alberta) Heather Nedohin	0	2	0	1	0	2	0	2	7
(Manitoba) Jill Thurston 🔨	2	0	1	0	1	0	2	0	6

Team	1	2	3	4	5	6	7	8	Final
(Alberta) Valerie Sweeting 🔨	0	2	3	1	0	1	0	0	7
(Ontario) Allison Flaxey	0	0	0	0	3	0	1	2	6

Team	1	2	3	4	5	6	7	8	Final
(Ontario) Rachel Homan 🔨	0	1	0	4	1	1	2	X	9
(Saskatchewan) Amber Holland	0	0	2	0	0	0	0	X	2

Team	1	2	3	4	5	6	7	8	Final
(Ontario) Sherry Middaugh 🔨	0	1	1	0	0	0	0	X	2
(Ontario) Julie Hastings	1	0	0	1	2	0	1	X	5

==== Draw 4 ====
Wednesday, December 10, 5:00 pm

Team	1	2	3	4	5	6	7	8	9	Final
(Switzerland) Silvana Tirinzoni 🔨	2	1	0	0	0	0	0	1	0	4
(Alberta) Valerie Sweeting	0	0	1	1	1	0	1	0	2	6

Team	1	2	3	4	5	6	7	8	Final
(Scotland) Eve Muirhead	0	0	0	2	0	0	X	X	2
(Manitoba) Kristy McDonald 🔨	0	3	2	0	1	1	X	X	7

Team	1	2	3	4	5	6	7	8	Final
(Alberta) Chelsea Carey 🔨	0	2	0	2	0	1	0	2	7
(Ontario) Allison Flaxey	0	0	2	0	2	0	2	0	6

Team	1	2	3	4	5	6	7	8	Final
(Saskatchewan) Chantelle Eberle	0	2	0	1	0	1	0	X	4
(Switzerland) Binia Feltscher 🔨	2	0	1	0	1	0	4	X	8

==== Draw 6 ====
Thursday, December 11, 8:00 am

Team	1	2	3	4	5	6	7	8	Final
(Manitoba) Jennifer Jones	0	1	1	0	2	0	2	0	6
(Alberta) Heather Nedohin 🔨	1	0	0	2	0	3	0	1	7

Team	1	2	3	4	5	6	7	8	Final
(Ontario) Rachel Homan 🔨	2	0	0	4	2	X	X	X	8
(Ontario) Julie Hastings	0	0	1	0	0	X	X	X	1

Team	1	2	3	4	5	6	7	8	Final
(United States) Nina Roth 🔨	1	0	0	4	0	1	0	0	6
(Manitoba) Jill Thurston	0	1	3	0	2	0	2	2	10

Team	1	2	3	4	5	6	7	8	Final
(Saskatchewan) Amber Holland	0	1	1	1	0	1	2	1	7
(Ontario) Sherry Middaugh 🔨	2	0	0	0	1	0	0	0	3

==== Draw 8 ====
Thursday, December 11, 2:30 pm

Team	1	2	3	4	5	6	7	8	Final
(Alberta) Heather Nedohin	0	0	0	2	0	0	1	X	3
(Alberta) Valerie Sweeting 🔨	1	2	0	0	1	1	0	X	5

Team	1	2	3	4	5	6	7	8	Final
(Ontario) Rachel Homan 🔨	0	1	0	2	0	1	0	4	8
(Manitoba) Kristy McDonald	0	0	4	0	2	0	1	0	7

Team	1	2	3	4	5	6	7	8	Final
(Manitoba) Jill Thurston	0	1	0	1	0	0	X	X	2
(Alberta) Chelsea Carey 🔨	1	0	2	0	3	1	X	X	7

Team	1	2	3	4	5	6	7	8	Final
(Saskatchewan) Amber Holland	0	1	0	0	1	2	0	X	4
(Switzerland) Binia Feltscher 🔨	3	0	0	1	0	0	1	X	5

Team	1	2	3	4	5	6	7	8	9	Final
(Manitoba) Jennifer Jones	0	0	3	0	2	0	2	1	2	10
(Switzerland) Silvana Tirinzoni 🔨	3	1	0	2	0	2	0	0	0	8

==== Draw 9 ====
Thursday, December 11, 6:30 pm

Team	1	2	3	4	5	6	7	8	Final
(Ontario) Julie Hastings	0	2	0	1	0	1	0	X	4
(Scotland) Eve Muirhead 🔨	1	0	1	0	1	0	3	X	6

==== Draw 10 ====
Friday, December 12, 8:00 am

Team	1	2	3	4	5	6	7	8	Final
(United States) Nina Roth	2	0	2	0	2	1	3	X	10
(Ontario) Allison Flaxey	0	3	0	3	0	0	0	X	6

Team	1	2	3	4	5	6	7	8	Final
(Ontario) Sherry Middaugh 🔨	2	0	0	2	1	0	2	X	7
(Saskatchewan) Chantelle Eberle	0	2	1	0	0	2	0	X	5

==== Draw 11 ====
Friday, December 12, 11:00 am

Team	1	2	3	4	5	6	7	8	Final
(Alberta) Chelsea Carey	0	1	0	2	0	3	0	3	9
(Manitoba) Kristy McDonald 🔨	1	0	1	0	2	0	3	0	7

Team	1	2	3	4	5	6	7	8	Final
(Switzerland) Binia Feltscher	0	0	1	0	1	0	1	0	3
(Alberta) Heather Nedohin 🔨	1	1	0	1	0	1	0	1	5

Team	1	2	3	4	5	6	7	8	Final
(Manitoba) Jill Thurston	0	3	0	2	1	2	0	1	9
(Saskatchewan) Amber Holland 🔨	2	0	3	0	0	0	1	0	6

==== Draw 12 ====
Friday, December 12, 2:30 pm

Team	1	2	3	4	5	6	7	8	Final
(Manitoba) Jennifer Jones 🔨	0	2	0	0	0	0	X	X	2
(Scotland) Eve Muirhead	1	0	2	2	2	1	X	X	8

Team	1	2	3	4	5	6	7	8	Final
(United States) Nina Roth	0	2	1	0	1	0	2	4	10
(Ontario) Julie Hastings 🔨	1	0	0	2	0	3	0	0	6

Team	1	2	3	4	5	6	7	8	Final
(Ontario) Sherry Middaugh 🔨	1	1	0	0	1	2	2	1	8
(Switzerland) Silvana Tirinzoni	0	0	0	1	0	0	0	0	1

==== Draw 13 ====
Friday, December 12, 6:30 pm

Team	1	2	3	4	5	6	7	8	Final
(United States) Nina Roth 🔨	0	1	0	1	0	1	1	0	4
(Switzerland) Binia Feltscher	0	0	2	0	2	0	0	1	5

Team	1	2	3	4	5	6	7	8	Final
(Ontario) Sherry Middaugh 🔨	1	1	0	0	2	1	0	1	6
(Ontario) Kristy McDonald	0	0	2	0	0	0	1	0	3

Team	1	2	3	4	5	6	7	8	Final
(Manitoba) Jill Thurston 🔨	1	0	1	0	0	0	0	X	2
(Manitoba) Jennifer Jones	0	2	0	1	1	1	1	X	6

=== Playoffs ===
Quarterfinals
(Ontario) Rachel Homan	7
(Switzerland) Binia Feltscher	3
(Alberta) Heather Nedohin	9
(Alberta) Chelsea Carey	3
(Alberta) Val Sweeting	5
(Ontario) Sherry Middaugh	4
(Scotland) Eve Muirhead	8
(Manitoba) Jennifer Jones	5

Semifinals
(Ontario) Rachel Homan	4
(Alberta) Heather Nedohin	3
(Alberta) Val Sweeting	3
(Scotland) Eve Muirhead	6

Final
(Ontario) Rachel Homan	3
(Scotland) Eve Muirhead	5

==== Quarterfinals ====
Saturday, December 6, 5:00 pm

Team	1	2	3	4	5	6	7	8	Final
(Ontario) Rachel Homan 🔨	0	2	0	2	3	0	0	X	7
(Switzerland) Binia Feltscher	0	0	1	0	0	1	1	X	3

Player percentages
(Ontario) Team Homan		(Switzerland) Team Feltscher	
Lisa Weagle	86%	Christine Urech	90%
Joanne Courtney	89%	Franziska Kaufmann	72%
Emma Miskew	85%	Irene Schori	80%
Rachel Homan	98%	Binia Feltscher	71%
Total	90%	Total	78%

Team	1	2	3	4	5	6	7	8	Final
(Alberta) Heather Nedohin 🔨	3	0	3	0	3	X	X	X	9
(Alberta) Chelsea Carey	0	1	0	2	0	X	X	X	3

Player percentages
(Alberta) Team Nedohin		(Alberta) Team Carey	
Laine Peters	95%	Jen Gates	94%
Jocelyn Peterman	75%	Taylor McDonald	80%
Amy Nixon	85%	Laura Crocker	82%
Heather Nedohin	84%	Chelsea Carey	54%
Total	85%	Total	77%

Team	1	2	3	4	5	6	7	8	Final
(Alberta) Val Sweeting 🔨	2	0	0	1	0	2	0	0	5
(Ontario) Sherry Middaugh	0	1	0	0	1	0	1	1	4

Player percentages
(Alberta) Team Sweeting		(Ontario) Team Middaugh	
Rachelle Brown	73%	Leigh Armstrong	97%
Dana Ferguson	75%	Lee Merklinger	70%
Lori Olson-Johns	71%	Jo-Ann Rizzo	71%
Val Sweeting	93%	Sherry Middaugh	75%
Total	78%	Total	79%

Team	1	2	3	4	5	6	7	8	Final
(Scotland) Eve Muirhead 🔨	2	0	2	0	1	0	3	X	8
(Manitoba) Jennifer Jones	0	3	0	1	0	1	0	X	5

Player percentages
(Scotland) Team Muirhead		(Manitoba) Team Jones	
Sarah Reid	75%	Dawn McEwen	88%
Vicki Adams	84%	Jill Officer	88%
Anna Sloan	71%	Kaitlyn Lawes	85%
Eve Muirhead	97%	Jennifer Jones	74%
Total	82%	Total	84%

==== Semifinals ====
Saturday, December 6, 8:30 pm

Team	1	2	3	4	5	6	7	8	Final
(Ontario) Rachel Homan 🔨	0	0	1	1	1	0	0	1	4
(Alberta) Heather Nedohin	0	1	0	0	0	1	1	0	3

Player percentages
(Ontario) Team Homan		(Alberta) Team Nedohin	
Lisa Weagle	80%	Laine Peters	80%
Joanne Courtney	79%	Jessica Mair	69%
Emma Miskew	93%	Amy Nixon	91%
Rachel Homan	94%	Heather Nedohin	76%
Total	87%	Total	79%

Team	1	2	3	4	5	6	7	8	Final
(Alberta) Val Sweeting 🔨	0	0	1	0	1	0	1	X	3
(Scotland) Eve Muirhead	0	1	0	1	0	4	0	X	6

Player percentages
(Alberta) Team Sweeting		(Scotland) Team Muirhead	
Rachelle Brown	87%	Sarah Reid	82%
Dana Ferguson	73%	Vicki Adams	75%
Lori Olson-Johns	76%	Anna Sloan	81%
Val Sweeting	86%	Eve Muirhead	97%
Total	80%	Total	84%

==== Final ====
Sunday, December 7, 5:00 pm

Team	1	2	3	4	5	6	7	8	Final
(Ontario) Rachel Homan 🔨	0	0	1	0	1	0	1	0	3
(Scotland) Eve Muirhead	0	2	0	1	0	1	0	1	5

Player percentages
(Ontario) Team Homan		(Scotland) Team Muirhead	
Lisa Weagle	84%	Sarah Reid	82%
Joanne Courtney	78%	Vicki Adams	90%
Emma Miskew	90%	Anna Sloan	79%
Rachel Homan	76%	Eve Muirhead	90%
Total	82%	Total	85%
