= 2019 Deloitte Tankard =

- Host city: Dartmouth, Nova Scotia
- Arena: Dartmouth Curling Club
- Dates: January 21–27
- Winner: Team Thompson
- Curling club: Dartmouth Curling Club
- Skip: Stuart Thompson
- Third: Colten Steele
- Second: Travis Colter
- Lead: Taylor Ardiel
- Finalist: Jamie Murphy

The 2019 Deloitte Tankard, the provincial men's curling championship of Nova Scotia, was held from January 21 to 27 at the Dartmouth Curling Club in Dartmouth. The winning Stuart Thompson team represented Nova Scotia at the 2019 Tim Hortons Brier in Brandon, Manitoba, Canada's national men's curling championship. It was held in conjunction with the 2019 Nova Scotia Scotties Tournament of Hearts, the provincial women's curling championship.

== Teams ==
Teams are as follows:

Skip	Third	Second	Lead	Alternate	Club(s)
Ian Fitzner-Leblanc	Cameron MacKenzie	Mark Robar	Jeff Wilson		Halifax Curling Club, Halifax
Brent MacDougall	Martin Gavin	Paul Dexter	Kirk MacDiarmid		Mayflower Curling Club, Halifax
Doug MacKenzie	Shea Steele	Richard Barker	Jared Brown		Windsor Curling Club, Windsor
Jamie Murphy	Paul Flemming	Scott Saccary	Philip Crowell	Andrew Gibson	Halifax Curling Club, Halifax
Kevin Ouellette	Mike Flemming	Kris Granchelli	Logan Ward		Mayflower Curling Club, Halifax
Chad Stevens	Peter Burgess	Graham Breckon	Kelly Mittelstadt		Chester Curling Club, Chester
Kendal Thompson	Bryce Everist	Chris MacRae	Michael Brophy	Matthew Manuel	Halifax Curling Club, Halifax
Stuart Thompson	Colten Steele	Travis Colter	Taylor Ardiel		Dartmouth Curling Club, Dartmouth

== Round-robin standings ==
Key
Teams to Playoffs

Skip	W	L
Murphy	7	0
Stevens	5	2
S. Thompson	5	2
MacDougall	3	4
K. Thompson	3	4
Fitzner-Leblanc	2	5
Ouellette	2	5
MacKenzie	1	6

== Scores ==
=== January 21 ===
Draw 1

- S. Thompson 8-2 Fitzner-Leblanc
- Murphy 9-3 Ouellette
- K. Thompson 9-6 MacKenzie
- Stevens 8-3 MacDougall

=== January 22 ===
Draw 2

- K. Thompson 10-4 Ouellette
- S. Thompson 7-5 MacDougall
- Stevens 9-6 Fitzner-Leblanc
- Murphy 7-3 MacKenzie

=== January 23 ===
Draw 3

- Stevens 8-4 MacKenzie
- Fitzner-Leblanc 8-7 K. Thompson
- Murphy 8-4 MacDougall
- S. Thompson 9-6 Ouellette

Draw 4

- MacDougall 9-7 Fitzner-Leblanc
- Ouellette 5-4 MacKenzie
- Stevens 8-5 S. Thompson
- Murphy 8-7 K. Thompson

=== January 24 ===
Draw 5

- S. Thompson 9-4 MacKenzie
- Murphy 10-3 Fitzner-Leblanc
- MacDougall 8-7 K. Thompson
- Stevens 9-0 Ouellette

=== January 25 ===
Draw 6

- Murphy 9-8 Stevens
- MacDougall 6-2 MacKenzie
- Fitzner-Leblanc 9-3 Ouellette
- S. Thompson 8-7 K. Thompson

Draw 7

- Ouellette 8-4 MacDougall
- K. Thompson 10-7 Stevens
- Murphy 8-4 S. Thompson
- MacKenzie 9-1 Fitzner-Leblanc

== Playoffs ==
Semifinal			Final
			1	Jamie Murphy	4
2	Chad Stevens	4	3	Stuart Thompson	6
3	Stuart Thompson	7

=== Semifinal ===
Saturday, January 26, 7:00 pm

Sheet D	1	2	3	4	5	6	7	8	9	10	Final
Chad Stevens	0	0	1	0	0	1	0	1	1	0	4
Stuart Thompson	0	2	0	0	1	0	2	0	0	2	7

=== Final ===
Sunday, January 27, 2:00pm

Sheet D	1	2	3	4	5	6	7	8	9	10	Final
Jamie Murphy	2	0	0	0	0	0	1	0	1	0	4
Stuart Thompson	0	0	1	2	0	0	0	2	0	1	6

2019 Nova Scotia Tankard

Stuart Thompson
1st Nova Scotia Provincial Championship title
