= 2019 Tim Hortons Brier =

Canadian curling tournament in Brandon, Manitoba

- Host city: Brandon, Manitoba
- Arena: Westoba Place
- Dates: March 2–10
- Attendance: 75,617
- Winner: Alberta
- Curling club: The Glencoe Club, Calgary
- Skip: Kevin Koe
- Third: B.J. Neufeld
- Second: Colton Flasch
- Lead: Ben Hebert
- Alternate: Ted Appelman
- Coach: John Dunn
- Finalist: (Alberta) Wildcard (Brendan Bottcher)

The 2019 Tim Hortons Brier, Canada's national men's curling championship, was held from March 2 to 10 at Westoba Place in Brandon, Manitoba. In the final, Kevin Koe of Alberta defeated Team Wildcard skipped by Brendan Bottcher 4–3 by scoring two in the tenth end to win. It was the lowest scoring Brier final since 1992, which was held before the adoption of any free guard zone rule.

The Koe rink represented Canada at the 2019 World Men's Curling Championship held from March 30 to April 7 at the ENMAX Centre in Lethbridge, Alberta.

This marked the third time the Brier has been held in Brandon, the first time since 1982.

This year's Brier was notable for a total team shot percentage efficiency for Northern Ontario of 97% during Draw 3 on March 3, tying a Brier record.

== Teams ==
The teams are as follows:

Canada	Alberta	British Columbia	Manitoba
Bally Haly G&CC & Re/Max Centre, St. John's Skip: Brad Gushue; Third: Mark Nichols; Second: Brett Gallant; Lead: Geoff Walker; Alternate: Tom Sallows	The Glencoe Club, Calgary Skip: Kevin Koe; Third: B.J. Neufeld; Second: Colton Flasch; Lead: Ben Hebert (Note: Team Alberta alternate Ted Appelman threw lead rocks during Draw 12.); Alternate: Ted Appelman	Kelowna CC, Kelowna & Vernon CC, Vernon Skip: Jim Cotter; Third: Steve Laycock; Second: Tyrel Griffith; Lead: Rick Sawatsky (Note: During Draw 6, Team British Columbia alternate Brad Wood threw lead stones in the last end.); Alternate: Brad Wood	West St. Paul CC, West St. Paul Skip: Mike McEwen; Third: Reid Carruthers; Second: Derek Samagalski; Lead: Colin Hodgson; Alternate: Matt Wozniak
New Brunswick	Newfoundland and Labrador	Northern Ontario	Nova Scotia
Curl Moncton, Moncton Skip: Terry Odishaw; Third: Jordan Pinder; Second: Marc LeCocq (Note: Team New Brunswick alternate Jamie Brannen threw second rocks during Draw 8.); Lead: Grant Odishaw; Alternate: Jamie Brannen	Re/Max Centre, St. John's Skip: Andrew Symonds; Third: Chris Ford; Second: Adam Boland; Lead: Keith Jewer (Note: During Draw 3, Team Newfoundland and Labrador alternate Rick Rowsell threw lead stones in the last 2 ends.); Alternate: Rick Rowsell	Community First CC, Sault Ste. Marie Skip: Brad Jacobs; Third: Ryan Fry; Second: E.J. Harnden; Lead: Ryan Harnden; Alternate: Lee Toner	Dartmouth CC, Dartmouth Skip: Stuart Thompson; Third: Colten Steele; Second: Travis Colter; Lead: Taylor Ardiel (Note: Team Nova Scotia alternate Bill MacPhee threw lead rocks for half of Draw 8.); Alternate: Bill MacPhee
Ontario	Prince Edward Island	Quebec	Saskatchewan
Cataraqui G&CC, Kingston Skip: Scott McDonald; Third: Jonathan Beuk; Second: Wes Forget (Note: Team Ontario alternate Jeff Grant threw second stones in the last end of Draw 6, and lead stones in the last end of Draw 8.); Lead: Scott Chadwick; Alternate: Jeff Grant	Charlottetown CC, Charlottetown & Western Community CC, Alberton Skip: John Likely; Third: Anson Carmody; Second: Steve Burgess (Note: Team Prince Edward Island alternate Matt Nabuurs threw lead stones during the last 2 ends of Draw 3, and second stones after the 5th end in Draw 5.); Lead: Robbie Doherty; Alternate: Matt Nabuurs	CC Etchemin, Saint-Romuald, CC Grand-Mère, Grand-Mère & Mt. Bruno CC, Saint-Bruno Skip: Martin Crête; Third: Philippe Lemay; Second: Éric Sylvain; Lead: Philippe Ménard; Alternate: Philippe Brassard	Nutana CC, Saskatoon Skip: Kirk Muyres; Third: Kevin Marsh; Second: Dan Marsh; Lead: Dallan Muyres
Northwest Territories	Nunavut	Yukon	(Alberta) Wildcard
(Note: In the last 3 ends of Draw 10, Team Northwest Territories skip Jamie Koe removed himself from the game, and each player moved up one position. During Draw 8, alternate Shadrach Mcleod threw second stones in the last 2 ends.)Yellowknife CC, Yellowknife Skip: Jamie Koe; Third: David Aho; Second: Matthew Ng; Lead: Cole Parsons; Alternate: Shadrach Mcleod	Iqaluit CC, Iqaluit Skip: Dave St. Louis; Third: Peter Mackey; Second: Jeff Nadeau; Lead: Lloyd Kendall	Whitehorse CC, Whitehorse Skip: Jon Solberg; Third: Bob Smallwood; Second: Clint Abel; Lead: Scott Odian (Note: Team Yukon lead Scott Odian suffered a knee injury in the 7th end of Draw 7. Alternate Dave Rach threw lead rocks for the rest of the tournament.); Alternate: Dave Rach	Saville SC, Edmonton Skip: Brendan Bottcher; Third: Darren Moulding; Second: Brad Thiessen; Lead: Karrick Martin

=== CTRS ranking ===
Member Association (Skip)	Rank	Points
Alberta (K. Koe)	1	385.263
Northern Ontario (Jacobs)	2	381.859
(Alberta) Wildcard (Bottcher)	4	333.694
Canada (Gushue)	5	321.422
Manitoba (McEwen)	8	242.301
Ontario (McDonald)	9	223.262
Saskatchewan (Muyres)	11	184.170
Nova Scotia (Thompson)	23	98.535
British Columbia (Cotter)	30	88.196
Quebec (Crête)	36	71.713
Newfoundland and Labrador (Symonds)	137	6.999
New Brunswick (Odishaw)	NR	0.000
Northwest Territories (J. Koe)	NR	0.000
Nunavut (St. Louis)	NR	0.000
Prince Edward Island (Likely)	NR	0.000
Yukon (Solberg)	NR	0.000

== Wildcard game ==
A play-in game was held on Friday, March 1 to determine the wildcard team to round out the tournament field. It was played between the top two teams in the Canadian Team Ranking System standings who lost in their provincial championships: the Leaside Curling Club's John Epping rink from Toronto and the Saville Community Sports Centre's Brendan Bottcher rink from Edmonton. Team Wildcard entered the Brier as the number 3 seed.

CTRS standings for wildcard game

Rank	Team	Member Association	Eligibility
1	~~Kevin Koe~~	Alberta	Won Alberta provincials
2	~~Brad Jacobs~~	Northern Ontario	Won Northern Ontario provincials
3	John Epping	Ontario	Eliminated from provincials
4	Brendan Bottcher	Alberta	Eliminated from provincials

Wildcard Game

Friday, March 1, 19:00

Sheet C	1	2	3	4	5	6	7	8	9	10	Final
(Ontario) John Epping	0	1	0	0	1	0	2	0	0	X	4
(Alberta) Brendan Bottcher 🔨	0	0	2	1	0	2	0	2	1	X	8

Player percentages
(Ontario) Team Epping		(Alberta) Team Bottcher	
Craig Savill	100%	Karrick Martin	94%
Brent Laing	86%	Brad Thiessen	95%
Matt Camm	80%	Darren Moulding	90%
John Epping	72%	Brendan Bottcher	85%
Total	85%	Total	91%

== Map of teams ==
Team Canada Provincial Winners Wild-Card Team

== Round robin standings ==
Key
Teams to championship round

Pool A	Skip	W	L	PF	PA	EW	EL	BE	SE	S%
Northern Ontario	Brad Jacobs	7	0	61	26	30	21	6	5	92%
(Alberta) Wildcard	Brendan Bottcher	6	1	63	36	29	23	4	8	86%
Manitoba	Mike McEwen	4	3	54	44	31	29	2	9	85%
Saskatchewan	Kirk Muyres	4	3	40	33	24	19	7	9	86%
Quebec	Martin Crête	3	4	49	44	27	27	3	7	76%
Yukon	Jon Solberg	3	4	38	54	26	30	3	6	75%
Prince Edward Island	John Likely	1	6	33	60	22	31	6	3	73%
Newfoundland and Labrador	Andrew Symonds	0	7	28	67	22	31	4	1	72%

Pool B	Skip	W	L	PF	PA	EW	EL	BE	SE	S%
Alberta	Kevin Koe	7	0	65	34	35	23	4	9	86%
Canada	Brad Gushue	6	1	58	33	33	24	3	7	88%
Ontario	Scott McDonald	4	3	53	41	29	23	2	11	86%
British Columbia	Jim Cotter	4	3	52	51	33	31	1	5	81%
Nova Scotia	Stuart Thompson	3	4	42	39	25	26	3	7	80%
New Brunswick	Terry Odishaw	3	4	50	46	33	30	1	11	80%
Northwest Territories	Jamie Koe	1	6	32	53	23	35	1	3	78%
Nunavut	Dave St. Louis	0	7	18	73	16	34	4	0	65%

== Round robin results ==
All draw times are listed in Central Standard Time (UTC−06:00).

=== Draw 1 ===
Saturday, March 2, 14:00

Sheet A	1	2	3	4	5	6	7	8	9	10	Final
Newfoundland and Labrador (Symonds) 🔨	0	0	0	1	0	1	0	0	2	0	4
Prince Edward Island (Likely)	0	0	0	0	2	0	0	1	0	2	5

Sheet B	1	2	3	4	5	6	7	8	9	10	Final
Yukon (Solberg)	0	0	0	1	0	0	1	0	X	X	2
Quebec (Crête) 🔨	4	1	1	0	2	2	0	1	X	X	11

Sheet C	1	2	3	4	5	6	7	8	9	10	Final
Manitoba (McEwen)	0	0	0	2	0	2	0	1	0	2	7
Saskatchewan (Muyres) 🔨	0	1	2	0	1	0	1	0	1	0	6

Sheet D	1	2	3	4	5	6	7	8	9	10	Final
(Alberta) Wildcard (Bottcher)	0	0	0	1	0	1	0	0	X	X	2
Northern Ontario (Jacobs) 🔨	0	3	0	0	3	0	1	3	X	X	10

=== Draw 2 ===
Saturday, March 2, 19:00

Sheet A	1	2	3	4	5	6	7	8	9	10	11	Final
British Columbia (Cotter) 🔨	2	0	1	0	1	0	1	0	2	0	1	8
Nova Scotia (Thompson)	0	1	0	1	0	2	0	2	0	1	0	7

Sheet B	1	2	3	4	5	6	7	8	9	10	Final
Canada (Gushue) 🔨	1	0	1	1	0	2	0	1	0	1	7
Ontario (McDonald)	0	3	0	0	1	0	1	0	1	0	6

Sheet C	1	2	3	4	5	6	7	8	9	10	Final
Alberta (K. Koe) 🔨	1	0	2	0	1	0	1	2	2	X	9
Northwest Territories (J. Koe)	0	1	0	2	0	1	0	0	0	X	4

Sheet D	1	2	3	4	5	6	7	8	9	10	Final
New Brunswick (Odishaw) 🔨	0	2	4	2	1	0	1	0	X	X	10
Nunavut (St. Louis)	0	0	0	0	0	1	0	1	X	X	2

=== Draw 3 ===
Sunday, March 3, 09:00

Sheet A	1	2	3	4	5	6	7	8	9	10	Final
Yukon (Solberg)	0	1	0	2	0	0	2	0	0	0	5
Saskatchewan (Muyres) 🔨	2	0	3	0	1	0	0	0	0	0	6

Sheet B	1	2	3	4	5	6	7	8	9	10	Final
Newfoundland and Labrador (Symonds)	0	0	0	1	0	1	0	0	X	X	2
Northern Ontario (Jacobs) 🔨	2	1	0	0	3	0	0	2	X	X	8

Sheet C	1	2	3	4	5	6	7	8	9	10	Final
(Alberta) Wildcard (Bottcher) 🔨	0	2	0	4	4	0	4	X	X	X	14
Prince Edward Island (Likely)	0	0	3	0	0	1	0	X	X	X	4

Sheet D	1	2	3	4	5	6	7	8	9	10	Final
Manitoba (McEwen)	1	1	0	1	0	2	2	0	1	X	8
Quebec (Crête) 🔨	0	0	1	0	0	0	0	2	0	X	3

=== Draw 4 ===
Sunday, March 3, 14:00

Sheet A	1	2	3	4	5	6	7	8	9	10	Final
Canada (Gushue) 🔨	2	0	1	0	0	1	0	3	0	X	7
Northwest Territories (J. Koe)	0	1	0	2	0	0	1	0	1	X	5

Sheet B	1	2	3	4	5	6	7	8	9	10	Final
British Columbia (Cotter) 🔨	0	1	0	4	0	2	0	3	X	X	10
Nunavut (St. Louis)	0	0	2	0	2	0	1	0	X	X	4

Sheet C	1	2	3	4	5	6	7	8	9	10	Final
New Brunswick (Odishaw) 🔨	0	1	1	0	1	0	0	0	0	X	3
Nova Scotia (Thompson)	1	0	0	2	0	1	1	1	1	X	7

Sheet D	1	2	3	4	5	6	7	8	9	10	Final
Alberta (K. Koe) 🔨	0	2	2	0	2	0	0	2	X	X	8
Ontario (McDonald)	0	0	0	2	0	1	0	0	X	X	3

=== Draw 5 ===
Sunday, March 3, 19:00

Sheet A	1	2	3	4	5	6	7	8	9	10	11	Final
(Alberta) Wildcard (Bottcher)	0	0	0	0	3	3	0	1	1	0	1	9
Manitoba (McEwen) 🔨	0	2	2	1	0	0	2	0	0	1	0	8

Sheet B	1	2	3	4	5	6	7	8	9	10	Final
Prince Edward Island (Likely)	0	0	0	0	0	2	0	0	X	X	2
Saskatchewan (Muyres) 🔨	1	2	2	3	0	0	0	1	X	X	9

Sheet C	1	2	3	4	5	6	7	8	9	10	Final
Northern Ontario (Jacobs) 🔨	0	2	0	1	0	0	4	0	X	X	7
Quebec (Crête)	0	0	1	0	1	0	0	1	X	X	3

Sheet D	1	2	3	4	5	6	7	8	9	10	Final
Newfoundland and Labrador (Symonds)	0	1	0	1	0	0	1	1	0	X	4
Yukon (Solberg) 🔨	1	0	2	0	3	1	0	0	1	X	8

=== Draw 6 ===
Monday, March 4, 09:00

Sheet A	1	2	3	4	5	6	7	8	9	10	Final
New Brunswick (Odishaw)	0	0	2	3	0	1	0	1	0	0	7
Alberta (K. Koe) 🔨	0	2	0	0	1	0	3	0	2	4	12

Sheet B	1	2	3	4	5	6	7	8	9	10	Final
Nova Scotia (Thompson)	0	1	0	0	2	0	0	2	0	1	6
Northwest Territories (J. Koe) 🔨	0	0	1	0	0	1	1	0	2	0	5

Sheet C	1	2	3	4	5	6	7	8	9	10	Final
Nunavut (St. Louis) 🔨	0	1	0	1	0	0	0	0	X	X	2
Ontario (McDonald)	1	0	3	0	1	3	0	1	X	X	9

Sheet D	1	2	3	4	5	6	7	8	9	10	Final
British Columbia (Cotter)	0	0	2	0	1	0	1	0	X	X	4
Canada (Gushue) 🔨	2	1	0	3	0	3	0	1	X	X	10

=== Draw 7 ===
Monday, March 4, 14:00

Sheet A	1	2	3	4	5	6	7	8	9	10	Final
Saskatchewan (Muyres)	0	0	4	0	1	0	0	1	1	1	8
Quebec (Crête) 🔨	0	2	0	3	0	1	0	0	0	0	6

Sheet B	1	2	3	4	5	6	7	8	9	10	Final
(Alberta) Wildcard (Bottcher) 🔨	3	0	1	0	2	0	2	0	2	X	10
Newfoundland and Labrador (Symonds)	0	1	0	1	0	2	0	1	0	X	5

Sheet C	1	2	3	4	5	6	7	8	9	10	Final
Yukon (Solberg)	0	0	3	0	2	0	0	0	1	1	7
Manitoba (McEwen) 🔨	0	2	0	1	0	2	1	0	0	0	6

Sheet D	1	2	3	4	5	6	7	8	9	10	Final
Northern Ontario (Jacobs) 🔨	2	1	0	2	0	1	0	4	X	X	10
Prince Edward Island (Likely)	0	0	1	0	1	0	2	0	X	X	4

=== Draw 8 ===
Monday, March 4, 19:00

Sheet A	1	2	3	4	5	6	7	8	9	10	Final
Northwest Territories (J. Koe)	0	0	0	2	0	0	0	0	X	X	2
Ontario (McDonald) 🔨	1	2	1	0	0	3	2	1	X	X	10

Sheet B	1	2	3	4	5	6	7	8	9	10	Final
New Brunswick (Odishaw) 🔨	0	1	0	1	0	2	0	1	1	0	6
British Columbia (Cotter)	1	0	1	0	2	0	2	0	0	1	7

Sheet C	1	2	3	4	5	6	7	8	9	10	Final
Canada (Gushue)	2	0	1	0	2	0	0	1	0	0	6
Alberta (K. Koe) 🔨	0	2	0	2	0	1	0	0	0	2	7

Sheet D	1	2	3	4	5	6	7	8	9	10	Final
Nunavut (St. Louis)	0	0	1	0	1	0	0	0	X	X	2
Nova Scotia (Thompson) 🔨	0	2	0	3	0	3	0	3	X	X	11

=== Draw 9 ===
Tuesday, March 5, 09:00

Sheet A	1	2	3	4	5	6	7	8	9	10	Final
Manitoba (McEwen) 🔨	1	0	2	3	0	3	0	4	X	X	13
Newfoundland and Labrador (Symonds)	0	1	0	0	2	0	1	0	X	X	4

Sheet B	1	2	3	4	5	6	7	8	9	10	Final
Quebec (Crête) 🔨	3	0	1	0	2	0	1	1	0	X	8
Prince Edward Island (Likely)	0	1	0	1	0	2	0	0	1	X	5

Sheet C	1	2	3	4	5	6	7	8	9	10	Final
Saskatchewan (Muyres)	0	1	0	0	2	0	0	1	1	X	5
Northern Ontario (Jacobs) 🔨	2	0	1	1	0	0	3	0	0	X	7

Sheet D	1	2	3	4	5	6	7	8	9	10	Final
Yukon (Solberg)	0	0	1	0	0	1	1	0	X	X	3
(Alberta) Wildcard (Bottcher) 🔨	1	1	0	6	0	0	0	2	X	X	10

=== Draw 10 ===
Tuesday, March 5, 14:00

Sheet A	1	2	3	4	5	6	7	8	9	10	Final
Alberta (K. Koe) 🔨	1	0	1	0	2	0	3	0	2	X	9
British Columbia (Cotter)	0	1	0	2	0	1	0	1	0	X	5

Sheet B	1	2	3	4	5	6	7	8	9	10	Final
Ontario (McDonald)	0	1	1	1	0	1	1	0	0	0	5
Nova Scotia (Thompson) 🔨	1	0	0	0	1	0	0	1	1	0	4

Sheet C	1	2	3	4	5	6	7	8	9	10	Final
Northwest Territories (J. Koe) 🔨	2	1	0	2	0	2	0	1	1	X	9
Nunavut (St. Louis)	0	0	1	0	1	0	2	0	0	X	4

Sheet D	1	2	3	4	5	6	7	8	9	10	Final
Canada (Gushue) 🔨	1	0	0	3	0	2	0	0	0	2	8
New Brunswick (Odishaw)	0	1	1	0	2	0	2	1	0	0	7

=== Draw 11 ===
Tuesday, March 5, 19:00

Sheet A	1	2	3	4	5	6	7	8	9	10	Final
Quebec (Crête) 🔨	0	1	0	0	0	1	0	2	0	X	4
(Alberta) Wildcard (Bottcher)	1	0	0	4	0	0	3	0	2	X	10

Sheet B	1	2	3	4	5	6	7	8	9	10	Final
Northern Ontario (Jacobs) 🔨	2	0	2	0	2	0	1	0	2	X	9
Manitoba (McEwen)	0	2	0	1	0	1	0	1	0	X	5

Sheet C	1	2	3	4	5	6	7	8	9	10	11	Final
Prince Edward Island (Likely) 🔨	0	0	2	1	0	3	0	0	0	1	0	7
Yukon (Solberg)	1	1	0	0	3	0	1	1	0	0	1	8

Sheet D	1	2	3	4	5	6	7	8	9	10	Final
Saskatchewan (Muyres) 🔨	0	4	0	1	0	3	1	0	X	X	9
Newfoundland and Labrador (Symonds)	0	0	1	0	3	0	0	1	X	X	5

=== Draw 12 ===
Wednesday, March 6, 09:00

Sheet A	1	2	3	4	5	6	7	8	9	10	11	Final
Ontario (McDonald) 🔨	2	0	1	0	2	0	1	0	1	1	0	8
New Brunswick (Odishaw)	0	3	0	1	0	2	0	2	0	0	1	9

Sheet B	1	2	3	4	5	6	7	8	9	10	Final
Nunavut (St. Louis) 🔨	0	1	0	0	0	0	1	0	X	X	2
Alberta (K. Koe)	1	0	2	2	2	2	0	4	X	X	13

Sheet C	1	2	3	4	5	6	7	8	9	10	Final
Nova Scotia (Thompson)	0	0	1	0	0	0	1	0	X	X	2
Canada (Gushue) 🔨	2	1	0	2	1	1	0	2	X	X	9

Sheet D	1	2	3	4	5	6	7	8	9	10	Final
Northwest Territories (J. Koe) 🔨	0	0	2	0	0	1	0	2	0	X	5
British Columbia (Cotter)	1	1	0	1	1	0	3	0	2	X	9

=== Draw 13 ===
Wednesday, March 6, 14:00

Sheet A	1	2	3	4	5	6	7	8	9	10	Final
Northern Ontario (Jacobs) 🔨	2	0	0	2	0	2	1	0	3	X	10
Yukon (Solberg)	0	2	0	0	2	0	0	1	0	X	5

Sheet B	1	2	3	4	5	6	7	8	9	10	Final
Saskatchewan (Muyres)	0	0	0	0	0	1	1	0	X	X	2
(Alberta) Wildcard (Bottcher) 🔨	0	2	1	2	1	0	0	2	X	X	8

Sheet C	1	2	3	4	5	6	7	8	9	10	Final
Quebec (Crête)	0	4	0	4	4	1	1	0	X	X	14
Newfoundland and Labrador (Symonds) 🔨	2	0	1	0	0	0	0	1	X	X	4

Sheet D	1	2	3	4	5	6	7	8	9	10	Final
Prince Edward Island (Likely) 🔨	0	0	2	0	0	1	1	0	1	1	6
Manitoba (McEwen)	0	2	0	2	0	0	0	3	0	0	7

=== Draw 14 ===
Wednesday, March 6, 19:00

Sheet A	1	2	3	4	5	6	7	8	9	10	Final
Nunavut (St. Louis)	0	0	0	1	0	0	1	0	X	X	2
Canada (Gushue) 🔨	7	1	0	0	2	0	0	1	X	X	11

Sheet B	1	2	3	4	5	6	7	8	9	10	Final
Northwest Territories (J. Koe)	0	0	0	0	1	0	1	0	X	X	2
New Brunswick (Odishaw) 🔨	3	1	1	1	0	1	0	1	X	X	8

Sheet C	1	2	3	4	5	6	7	8	9	10	Final
Ontario (McDonald) 🔨	2	0	4	0	1	0	0	1	0	2	10
British Columbia (Cotter)	0	2	0	1	0	3	1	0	2	0	9

Sheet D	1	2	3	4	5	6	7	8	9	10	Final
Nova Scotia (Thompson)	0	0	2	0	0	1	0	1	0	1	5
Alberta (K. Koe) 🔨	2	0	0	1	1	0	1	0	2	0	7

== Championship pool standings ==
All wins and losses earned in the round robin (including results against teams that failed to advance) were carried forward into the championship pool.

Key
Teams to playoffs

Team	Skip	W	L	PF	PA	EW	EL	BE	SE	S%
Alberta	Kevin Koe	11	0	94	53	51	38	9	11	87%
Northern Ontario	Brad Jacobs	9	2	90	51	46	38	8	8	91%
Canada	Brad Gushue	9	2	86	52	50	39	7	10	88%
(Alberta) Wildcard	Brendan Bottcher	8	3	88	58	45	37	8	12	86%
Manitoba	Mike McEwen	6	5	79	67	48	44	3	13	85%
Ontario	Scott McDonald	6	5	75	65	50	44	3	16	85%
Saskatchewan	Kirk Muyres	5	6	62	69	43	40	11	12	83%
British Columbia	Jim Cotter	4	7	72	85	47	49	2	6	81%

== Championship pool results ==
All draw times are listed in Central Standard Time (UTC−6:00).

=== Draw 15 ===
Thursday, March 7, 14:00

Sheet A	1	2	3	4	5	6	7	8	9	10	Final
Saskatchewan (Muyres)	1	0	0	2	0	0	0	0	1	0	4
Ontario (McDonald) 🔨	0	2	0	0	1	0	0	1	0	3	7

Sheet B	1	2	3	4	5	6	7	8	9	10	Final
Alberta (K. Koe) 🔨	0	2	0	1	0	1	0	0	0	3	7
(Alberta) Wildcard (Bottcher)	0	0	2	0	1	0	0	2	1	0	6

Sheet C	1	2	3	4	5	6	7	8	9	10	Final
Northern Ontario (Jacobs) 🔨	2	0	5	0	2	0	2	0	X	X	11
British Columbia (Cotter)	0	2	0	1	0	1	0	1	X	X	5

Sheet D	1	2	3	4	5	6	7	8	9	10	Final
Canada (Gushue) 🔨	1	0	0	0	2	0	1	0	2	X	6
Manitoba (McEwen)	0	1	0	0	0	1	0	1	0	X	3

=== Draw 16 ===
Thursday, March 7, 19:00

Sheet A	1	2	3	4	5	6	7	8	9	10	Final
Manitoba (McEwen) 🔨	1	0	0	1	0	0	2	0	1	0	5
Alberta (K. Koe)	0	1	0	0	0	1	0	2	0	2	6

Sheet B	1	2	3	4	5	6	7	8	9	10	11	Final
Ontario (McDonald)	2	1	0	1	1	0	0	0	1	0	1	7
Northern Ontario (Jacobs) 🔨	0	0	1	0	0	1	1	1	0	2	0	6

Sheet C	1	2	3	4	5	6	7	8	9	10	Final
Canada (Gushue)	0	2	0	1	0	1	2	0	2	X	8
Saskatchewan (Muyres) 🔨	1	0	1	0	1	0	0	1	0	X	4

Sheet D	1	2	3	4	5	6	7	8	9	10	Final
(Alberta) Wildcard (Bottcher) 🔨	1	0	0	2	3	0	2	0	X	X	8
British Columbia (Cotter)	0	1	0	0	0	1	0	1	X	X	3

=== Draw 17 ===
Friday, March 8, 14:00

Sheet A	1	2	3	4	5	6	7	8	9	10	11	Final
Northern Ontario (Jacobs)	0	1	0	0	0	2	0	3	0	0	1	7
Canada (Gushue) 🔨	2	0	0	2	0	0	1	0	0	1	0	6

Sheet B	1	2	3	4	5	6	7	8	9	10	Final
British Columbia (Cotter) 🔨	1	0	2	0	2	0	2	0	0	X	7
Manitoba (McEwen)	0	2	0	1	0	2	0	2	2	X	9

Sheet C	1	2	3	4	5	6	7	8	9	10	Final
Ontario (McDonald)	0	1	0	0	0	1	0	0	2	X	4
(Alberta) Wildcard (Bottcher) 🔨	3	0	0	0	1	0	1	1	0	X	6

Sheet D	1	2	3	4	5	6	7	8	9	10	Final
Alberta (K. Koe) 🔨	2	2	1	0	2	0	2	0	X	X	9
Saskatchewan (Muyres)	0	0	0	1	0	1	0	1	X	X	3

=== Draw 18 ===
Friday, March 8, 19:00

Sheet A	1	2	3	4	5	6	7	8	9	10	Final
British Columbia (Cotter)	1	0	3	0	0	0	0	1	0	0	5
Saskatchewan (Muyres) 🔨	0	1	0	2	1	0	1	0	0	1	6

Sheet B	1	2	3	4	5	6	7	8	9	10	Final
(Alberta) Wildcard (Bottcher) 🔨	1	1	0	0	0	2	0	1	X	X	5
Canada (Gushue)	0	0	2	2	1	0	3	0	X	X	8

Sheet C	1	2	3	4	5	6	7	8	9	10	Final
Alberta (K. Koe) 🔨	0	0	0	3	0	0	0	2	0	2	7
Northern Ontario (Jacobs)	0	0	1	0	0	2	0	0	2	0	5

Sheet D	1	2	3	4	5	6	7	8	9	10	Final
Manitoba (McEwen)	1	0	1	0	0	3	0	1	2	X	8
Ontario (McDonald) 🔨	0	2	0	1	1	0	0	0	0	X	4

== Playoffs ==
Page playoff system
1	Alberta	9
2	Northern Ontario	4
3	Canada	2
4	(Alberta) Wildcard	7

Semifinal
2	Northern Ontario	4
4	(Alberta) Wildcard	5

Final
1	Alberta	4
4	(Alberta) Wildcard	3

=== 1 vs. 2 ===
Saturday, March 9, 19:00

Sheet C	1	2	3	4	5	6	7	8	9	10	Final
Alberta (K. Koe) 🔨	2	3	0	2	0	0	2	0	X	X	9
Northern Ontario (Jacobs)	0	0	1	0	1	0	0	2	X	X	4

Player percentages
Alberta		Northern Ontario	
Ben Hebert	80%	Ryan Harnden	92%
Colton Flasch	78%	E.J. Harnden	89%
B.J. Neufeld	88%	Ryan Fry	92%
Kevin Koe	94%	Brad Jacobs	56%
Total	85%	Total	82%

=== 3 vs. 4 ===
Saturday, March 9, 14:00

Sheet C	1	2	3	4	5	6	7	8	9	10	Final
Canada (Gushue) 🔨	0	0	1	0	0	1	0	0	0	X	2
(Alberta) Wildcard (Bottcher)	0	1	0	0	1	0	0	4	1	X	7

Player percentages
Canada		(Alberta) Wildcard	
Geoff Walker	89%	Karrick Martin	86%
Brett Gallant	90%	Brad Thiessen	89%
Mark Nichols	93%	Darren Moulding	92%
Brad Gushue	81%	Brendan Bottcher	93%
Total	88%	Total	90%

=== Semifinal ===
Sunday, March 10, 13:00

Sheet C	1	2	3	4	5	6	7	8	9	10	Final
Northern Ontario (Jacobs) 🔨	1	1	0	1	0	0	1	0	0	0	4
(Alberta) Wildcard (Bottcher)	0	0	2	0	1	0	0	0	0	2	5

Player percentages
Northern Ontario		(Alberta) Wildcard	
Ryan Harnden	99%	Karrick Martin	94%
E.J. Harnden	86%	Brad Thiessen	85%
Ryan Fry	99%	Darren Moulding	93%
Brad Jacobs	86%	Brendan Bottcher	93%
Total	93%	Total	91%

=== Final ===
Sunday, March 10, 19:00

Sheet C	1	2	3	4	5	6	7	8	9	10	Final
Alberta (K. Koe) 🔨	0	1	0	1	0	0	0	0	0	2	4
(Alberta) Wildcard (Bottcher)	0	0	0	0	0	0	0	2	1	0	3

Player percentages
Alberta		(Alberta) Wildcard	
Ben Hebert	95%	Karrick Martin	93%
Colton Flasch	94%	Brad Thiessen	85%
B.J. Neufeld	89%	Darren Moulding	80%
Kevin Koe	93%	Brendan Bottcher	86%
Total	93%	Total	86%

== Statistics ==
=== Top 5 player percentages ===
Final round robin percentages; minimum 6 games

Key
First All-Star Team
Second All-Star Team

Leads	%
(Saskatchewan) Dallan Muyres	92
(Manitoba) Colin Hodgson	92
(Alberta) Ben Hebert	92
(Northern Ontario) Ryan Harnden	92
(Northwest Territories) Cole Parsons	91
WC Karrick Martin	91

Seconds	%
(Northern Ontario) E.J. Harnden	91
(Canada) Brett Gallant	90
WC Brad Thiessen	88
(Ontario) Wes Forget	88
(Manitoba) Derek Samagalski	86

Thirds	%
(Northern Ontario) Ryan Fry	90
(Alberta) B.J. Neufeld	88
(Canada) Mark Nichols	88
WC Darren Moulding	84
(Ontario) Jonathan Beuk	84

Skips	%
(Northern Ontario) Brad Jacobs	91
(Canada) Brad Gushue	88
(Alberta) Kevin Koe	85
(Ontario) Scott McDonald	82
WC Brendan Bottcher	81
(Manitoba) Mike McEwen	81

=== Perfect games ===
Round robin and championship pool only

Player	Team	Position	Shots	Opponent
E.J. Harnden	Northern Ontario	Second	16	Prince Edward Island
Wes Forget	Ontario	Second	16	Northwest Territories

== Awards ==
The awards and all-star teams are listed as follows:

All-Star Teams

First Team

- Skip: Brad Jacobs, Northern Ontario
- Third: Ryan Fry, Northern Ontario
- Second: E.J. Harnden, Northern Ontario
- Lead: Dallan Muyres, Saskatchewan

Second Team

- Skip: Brad Gushue, Team Canada
- Third: B.J. Neufeld, Alberta
- Second: Brett Gallant, Team Canada
- Lead: Colin Hodgson, Manitoba

Ross Harstone Sportsmanship Award

- (Alberta) Darren Moulding, Team Wildcard Third

Hec Gervais Most Valuable Player Award

- Kevin Koe, Alberta Skip

== Provincial and territorial playdowns ==
- 2019 Boston Pizza Cup (Alberta)
- (British Columbia) 2019 BC Men's Curling Championship
- 2019 Viterra Championship (Manitoba)
- (New Brunswick) 2019 NB Tankard
- 2019 Newfoundland and Labrador Tankard
- 2019 NOCA Men's Provincial Championship (Northern Ontario)
- 2019 Deloitte Tankard (Nova Scotia)
- 2019 Ontario Tankard
- (Prince Edward Island) 2019 PEI Tankard
- 2019 WFG Tankard (Quebec)
- 2019 SaskTel Tankard (Saskatchewan)
- 2019 Northwest Territories Men's Curling Championship
- 2019 Yukon Men's Curling Championship
- 2019 Nunavut Brier Playdowns
