= Darren Moulding =

Canadian curler (born 1982)

- Curler
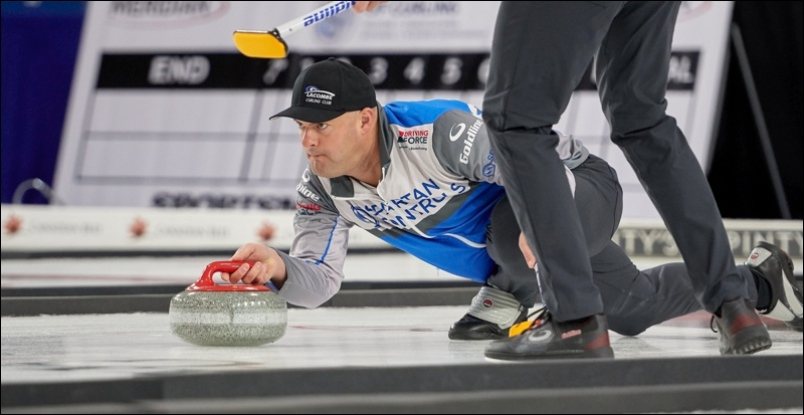
- Moulding at the 2019 Canadian Open
- Born: December 2, 1982 (age 43); Calgary, Alberta, Canada

Team
- Curling club: Calgary Curling Club, Calgary
- Skip: Darren Moulding
- Third: Kyler Kleibrink
- Second: Andrew Nerpin
- Lead: Evan Crough

Curling career
- Member Association: Alberta (2000–2022; 2024–present); New Brunswick (2022); Northern Ontario (2022–2024)
- Brier: 7 (2017, 2018, 2019, 2020, 2021, 2022, 2023)
- World Championship: 1 (2021)
- Top CTRS ranking: 1st (2018–19)
- Grand Slam victories: 3 (2019 Canadian Open, 2019 Players', 2019 Champions Cup)
Medal record
Men's curling
Representing Alberta
Tim Hortons Brier
Gold medal – first place	2021 Calgary
Silver medal – second place	2018 Regina
Silver medal – second place	2020 Kingston
Representing (Alberta) Team Wild Card
Tim Hortons Brier
Silver medal – second place	2019 Brandon

Darren Moulding (born December 2, 1982) is a Canadian curler from Langdon, Alberta. He currently coaches Team Thomas Scoffin. He is a former Canadian Junior Silver Medallist, a Canadian Mixed Champion, and represented Alberta in the 2017, 2018, 2020 and Team Wild Card in the 2019 Brier Canadian men's championship.

== Career ==
=== Junior ===
Moulding skipped the Alberta team at both the 2000 and 2003 Canadian Junior Curling Championships. At the 2000 Juniors, he led his team of Thomas Usselman, Ryan Inaba and Matt Taylor to a 5-7 record, missing the playoffs. At the 2003 Juniors, he led his rink of Brock Virtue, Taylor and Nicolas Virtue to a silver medal finish. The team finished the round robin with an 8-4 record, the proceeded to win the tiebreaker match and the semifinal before losing to Saskatchewan (skipped by Steve Laycock) in the final.

=== Men's ===
After juniors, Moulding formed his own team to play on the World Curling Tour. He played in his first Grand Slam of Curling event when he was invited to play third for Steve Laycock at the 2006 Masters of Curling, where they failed to qualify for the playoffs. Moulding found little success skipping on the tour, failing to win a single event before he joined the Steve Petryk rink in 2009. He played one full season with Petryk, finding little success with him either. Moulding began skipping his own team again in 2010, but did not play in many events for the next few seasons.

In 2013, Moulding joined the Matthew Blandford rink has his third. That season, Moulding won his first career tour event, when the rink won the McKee Homes Fall Curling Classic. The next season, the team played in Moulding's second career Slam event, the 2014 National, where they won two games. Later in the season, Moulding was invited to play for his former junior teammate Brock Virtue's team at the Black Diamond / High River Cash event, which they won. For the 2015-16 season, Virtue joined the Blandford rink as skip, moving Moulding to play second. The team would not win any events. Virtue left the rink at the end of the season.

Over the 2016 Christmas break, Moulding joined the Brendan Bottcher rink at third following the departure of Pat Simmons from the team. In their first event together, the team made it to the quarterfinals at the 2017 Canadian Open. In February 2017 Moulding, Bottcher, Brad Thiessen and Karrick Martin won the 2017 Boston Pizza Cup. After a 3–0 record through the preliminary round, they won both the 1 vs. 2 page playoff game and the championship final, defeating the Ted Appelman rink 6–5 in the final game. The win earned Team Bottcher the right to represent Alberta at the 2017 Tim Hortons Brier, Moulding's first appearance at the Canadian national men's championship. There, the team finished with a 3–8 round robin record, however, was able to defeat the defending champions Team Kevin Koe in one of those victories. They went 1–4 in their final event of the season, the 2017 Players' Championship.

During the 2017–18 season, the Bottcher rink won two tour events, the Medicine Hat Charity Classic and the Red Deer Curling Classic. They also reached the semifinals of the 2017 GSOC Tour Challenge Tier 2, losing their semifinal game to William Lyburn. In November 2017, the team competed in the Canadian Olympic Curling Pre-Trials in attempts to qualify for the 2017 Canadian Olympic Curling Trials. After a slow start, they managed to qualify for the playoffs with a 3–3 record. They then beat Glenn Howard in one of the semifinal games before losing to the John Morris rink in the first qualification final. They were, however, able to again defeat Howard in the second final, earning the ninth and final spot at the Olympic Trials. At the Trials, held December 2 to 10 in Ottawa, Ontario, the team posted a 4–4 round robin record, finishing in fourth place and just out of the playoffs. In the new year, they reached the quarterfinals of the 2018 Canadian Open where they lost to the eventual champions Team Peter de Cruz. Team Bottcher posted a perfect 5–0 record en route to defend their title at the 2018 Boston Pizza Cup, earning the right to represent Alberta at the 2018 Tim Hortons Brier. There, the team finished with an 8–3 record, earning a spot in the 3 vs. 4 page playoff game. They beat Northern Ontario's Brad Jacobs in the 3 vs. 4 game and then defeated Ontario's John Epping in the semifinal to reach the Brier final. In the championship game, against Team Canada's Brad Gushue, the team settled for silver after a 6–4 defeat. They ended their season at the 2018 Players' Championship and the 2018 Humpty's Champions Cup Slams. After missing the playoffs at the Players', they made the quarterfinals at the Champions Cup.

Team Bottcher had a strong start to the 2018–19 season, winning their second event, the Canad Inns Men's Classic, by defeating Team Kevin Koe in the final. They later played in the 2018 Tour Challenge where they made it all the way to the final where they were defeated by the Brad Jacobs rink. They also made the final of the Red Deer Curling Classic and reached the tiebreaker stage of the 2018 Canada Cup where they were beaten by the Koe rink. In January 2019, Team Bottcher would win their first Grand Slam event at the 2019 Canadian Open, capping off an undefeated week by defeating Team John Epping 6–3 in the final. They then competed in and won the 2019 TSN All-Star Curling Skins Game, earning $54,500 for their win. Despite losing the semifinal of the 2019 Boston Pizza Cup, Team Bottcher still competed in the 2019 Tim Hortons Brier as the Wildcard entry after beating the Epping rink in the wildcard game. After an 8–3 record through the round robin and championship pools, they qualified for the playoffs for the second straight year. They then secured wins over Canada's Brad Gushue and Northern Ontario's Brad Jacobs in the 3 vs. 4 page playoff and semifinal games respectively, qualifying for their second straight Brier final where they faced the Koe rink in the final. After a close game all the way through, Team Koe would score two in the tenth end to win the game 4–3, handing Team Bottcher another silver medal. They ended their season at the 2019 Players' Championship and 2019 Champions Cup Grand Slam events. At the Players', they went 3–2 through the round robin before winning all three of their playoff games to win the title. They also found success at the Champions Cup, going an undefeated 7–0 to claim their third straight Slam title.

Team Bottcher began their 2019–20 season at the 2019 AMJ Campbell Shorty Jenkins Classic where they lost the tiebreaker to Yannick Schwaller. They then played in the first two Slams of the season, reaching the quarterfinals of the 2019 Masters and the semifinals of the 2019 Tour Challenge. Team Bottcher won their first event of the season at the Ashley HomeStore Curling Classic, defeating the Mike McEwen rink in the final. They then lost in the semifinal of the 2019 Canada Cup to eventual winners Team John Epping. At the next two Slams, the team made the quarterfinals of the 2019 National and missed the playoffs at the 2020 Canadian Open. After losing the semifinal to Kevin Koe at provincials the previous season, Team Bottcher would win the 2020 Boston Pizza Cup with a draw to the button to defeat Karsten Sturmay 7–6. At the 2020 Tim Hortons Brier, the team went undefeated through the round robin with a 7–0 record. They then went 3–1 in the championship pool, and then beat Saskatchewan's Matt Dunstone in the 1 vs. 2 page playoff game. For the third year in a row, they would finish runner-up at the Brier, losing to Newfoundland and Labrador's Brad Gushue 7–3 in the championship final. It would be the team's last event of the season as both the Players' Championship and the Champions Cup Grand Slam events were cancelled due to the COVID-19 pandemic.

Team Bottcher played in three tour events during the 2020–21 season, winning the ATB Okotoks Classic and reaching the semifinals at both the ATB Banff Classic and the Ashley HomeStore Curling Classic. Due to the COVID-19 pandemic in Alberta, the 2021 provincial championship was cancelled. As the reigning provincial champions, Team Bottcher was chosen to represent Alberta at the 2021 Tim Hortons Brier. At the Brier, they finished second in their pool during round-robin play, with a 6–2 record. In the championship pool they improved their record to 9–3, earning the third seed in the playoffs where they defeated Matt Dunstone's Team Saskatchewan in the semifinals to make it to their fourth Brier finals in a row. Team Bottcher defeated four-time Brier champion Kevin Koe in the finals, with a score of 4–2, to win their first Brier championship. With the Brier win, Team Bottcher earned the right to represent Canada at the 2021 World Men's Curling Championship. There, the team led Canada to a 9–4 round robin record, in fourth place. This put them into the playoffs in a game against Scotland, skipped by Bruce Mouat, which they lost, eliminating the team. The team wrapped up the season in the bubble by playing in the season's only two slams. They lost to Mouat again in the final of the 2022 Champions Cup and missed the playoffs in the 2022 Players' Championship.

The next season, the team's first major tournament was the 2021 Masters, where they the lost to Mouat in the semifinals. The following week, the team represented Canada at the 2021 Americas Challenge, easily beating Brazil and Mexico to qualify Canada for a spot at the 2022 World Men's Curling Championship. The following week, they played in the 2021 National being eliminated once again by Team Mouat, this time in the quarterfinals. The team wrapped up the month of November at the 2021 Canadian Olympic Curling Trials, held November 20 to 28 in Saskatoon, Saskatchewan. There, they posted a disappointing 3–5 record. Following the Trials, Moulding was cut from the team. His cut caused controversy, as the team stated on social media that he was leaving the team for "personal reasons", in which Moulding replied was "complete BS". Moulding stated that a rift with his teammates began the previous season while in the Calgary curling bubble, when he "challenged Bottcher on issues that he felt were important (to the team)". This included a "better business structure", suggesting that he wanted an equal share of the team's winnings. Moulding was replaced by the team's alternate, Patrick Janssen. Despite this cut halfway through the season, Moulding was still determined to compete in the 2022 Tim Hortons Brier, which was being held in his hometown of Lethbridge, Alberta. He joined the James Grattan rink prior to the 2022 New Brunswick Tankard in attempts to qualify for the national championship. Team Grattan was successful in winning the provincial title, qualifying Moulding and new teammates Grattan, Paul Dobson, Andy McCann and Jamie Brannen for the Brier. In the third draw of the championship, New Brunswick faced Team Canada, which was being represented by the Bottcher rink. Despite Team Bottcher being from Alberta, fans were more supportive of the New Brunswick rink due to how Moulding's cut was handled. Team Grattan ultimately lost the match 6–4, and went on to finish the event with a 3–5 record.

=== Mixed ===
Moulding won the 2014 Canadian Mixed Curling Championship skipping Team Alberta, which also consisted of his sister Heather Jensen, Brent Hamilton and his then wife Anna-Marie Moulding. The team finished the round robin tied for first with a 9–2 record. They then went on to defeat Ontario (skipped by Cory Heggestad) in the final.

=== Mixed doubles ===
Moulding competed at his first major mixed doubles tournament in 2021, joining Joanne Courtney to compete in the 2021 Canadian Mixed Doubles Curling Championship. They started the tournament with a win over two-time champions Jocelyn Peterman and Brett Gallant. Unfortunately, after starting with a 3–0 record, Moulding experienced back spasms during the night of March 21, which forced him and Courtney to forfeit their match the next morning. Later that day the duo announced their withdrawal from the remainder of the competition.

== Personal life ==
Moulding has one son, and one stepdaughter. He is the Owner of 15&5 Curling Ice Services.

== Teams ==
Season	Skip	Third	Second	Lead	Alternate
2013–14	Matthew Blandford	Darren Moulding			
2014–15	Matthew Blandford	Darren Moulding			
2015–16	Brock Virtue	Matthew Blandford	Darren Moulding		
2016–17	Brendan Bottcher	Pat Simmons; Darren Moulding	Brad Thiessen	Karrick Martin	
2017–18	Brendan Bottcher	Darren Moulding	Brad Thiessen	Karrick Martin	
2018–19	Brendan Bottcher	Darren Moulding	Brad Thiessen	Karrick Martin	
2019–20	Brendan Bottcher	Darren Moulding	Brad Thiessen	Karrick Martin	
2020–21	Brendan Bottcher	Darren Moulding	Brad Thiessen	Karrick Martin	
2021	Brendan Bottcher	Darren Moulding	Brad Thiessen	Karrick Martin	
2022	James Grattan	Darren Moulding	Paul Dobson	Andy McCann / Jamie Brannen	
2022–23	Tanner Horgan (Fourth)	Darren Moulding (Skip)	Jacob Horgan	Colin Hodgson	
2023–24	Darren Moulding	Tanner Horgan	Jacob Horgan	Ian McMillan	
2024–25	Evan van Amsterdam	Jason Ginter	Sterling Middleton	Parker Konschuh	Darren Moulding
2025–26	Darren Moulding	Kyler Kleibrink	Andrew Nerpin	Evan Crough	
