= Nick Meister =

Canadian curler (born 1995)

Nicholas Meister
- Curler
- Born: December 25, 1995 (age 30); Winnipeg, Manitoba, Canada

Team
- Curling club: Langley CC, Langley, BC
- Skip: Richard Krell
- Third: Daniel Wenzek
- Second: Jordan Tardi
- Lead: Nick Meister
- Mixed doubles partner: Shawna Jensen

Curling career
- Member Association: British Columbia
- Brier: 1 (2022)

Nicholas Meister (born December 25, 1995) is a Canadian curler from Langley, British Columbia. He currently plays lead on Team Richard Krell. He is a former Canadian Junior Champion.

== Career ==
=== Juniors ===
After skipping his own team in juniors, Meister played lead for the Tyler Tardi junior rink from 2013 to 2017. As a member of the Tardi rink, Meister won the British Columbia men's junior championship in 2016 and 2017. The team represented the province at the 2016 and 2017 Canadian Junior Curling Championships. In 2016, they finished the tournament with a 7-3 round robin record, and won a bronze medal after losing to Manitoba's Matt Dunstone in the semi-final. The next year, the team went 11–1 at the Canadian Juniors, and ultimately won the event, defeating Ontario's Matthew Hall rink in the final. The team then represented Canada at the 2017 World Junior Curling Championships. There, they finished the round robin with a 6–3 record, but missed the playoffs after losing a tiebreaker match against Norway's Magnus Ramsfjell. That season, the team also won the 2016 Prestige Hotels & Resorts Curling Classic on the World Curling Tour. After the 2016–17 season, Meister aged out of juniors.

While a junior, Meister played in his first men's provincial championship in 2015, playing third for the Daniel Wenzek team. The team went 2–3, before being eliminated. Meister played on Team Tardi's junior team at the 2016 and 2017 BC provincial championships. In 2016, Tardi could not play as he was playing at the 2016 Winter Youth Olympics, so the played with just three players, and was skipped by Wenzek. At the 2016 provincials, they went 2–3 before being eliminated. In 2017, the team with Tardi skipping went 3–3, losing in both the B and C finals.

=== Men's ===
After juniors, Meister joined the Jeff Guignard rink, playing lead on the team. As a member of Team Guignard, Meister won the 2017 Prestige Hotels & Resorts Curling Classic. In 2018, Meister and Wenzek formed a new team, with Meister continuing to play lead. The team made it to the 2019 BC Men's Curling Championship, where they made it to the playoffs, where they lost to Josh Barry in the C1 vs. C2 game. In 2019, Meister joined the Sean Geall rink at lead. With Geall, he won the 2019 King Cash Spiel World Curling Tour event. They played at the 2020 BC Men's Curling Championship, going 3–3, losing in the C Final.

Meister joined the Brent Pierce rink in 2021 as lead. The team won the 2022 BC Men's Curling Championship, and represented British Columbia at the 2022 Tim Hortons Brier, Meister's first. The team finished with a 4-4 record.

Meister then joined the Jared Kolomaya rink in 2024. The team qualified for the 2025 BC Men's Curling Championship.

=== Mixed doubles ===
Meister won the 2018 BC Mixed Doubles Championship with Megan Daniels, and represented the province at the 2018 Canadian Mixed Doubles Curling Championship. There, they finished with a 3–4 record in pool play.

== Personal life ==
Meister works as an ice technician with the Merklinger Icemaking Co. He was a member of the ice crew at the 2018 BC Men's Junior Championship, a year after he aged out of juniors.
