= Brad Wood (curler) =

Canadian curler

- Curler
- Born: August 2, 1971 (age 55); Nelson, British Columbia

Team
- Curling club: Penticton CC, Penticton, BC
- Skip: Jim Cotter
- Third: Jared Kolomaya
- Second: Connor Deane
- Lead: Erik Colwell
- Alternate: Brad Wood

Curling career
- Member Association: British Columbia
- Brier: 4 (2011, 2018, 2019, 2020)
- Top CTRS ranking: 58th (2009–10)

Brad Wood (born August 2, 1971) is a Canadian curler from Penticton, British Columbia. He is currently the alternate on Team Jim Cotter.

== Career ==
Wood has made four trips to the Tim Hortons Brier, all as alternate for Team British Columbia. His first appearance was in 2011 as alternate for Jim Cotter where BC finished in seventh place with a 4–7 record. His next trip was seven years later when he spared for the Sean Geall rink at the 2018 Tim Hortons Brier. Despite being listed as alternate, Wood played in every game for the team as lead David Harper and third Jeff Richard both had to leave the tournament at different points due to their wives expecting babies. The team finished in twelfth place with a 2–6 record. Wood was back the following year at the 2019 event once again sparing for Cotter. The team qualified for the championship pool with a 4–3 record before losing all four of their next matches, finishing in eighth place; once again with a 4–7 record. He made his fourth trip to the Brier in 2020 where Steve Laycock skipped the BC team but Jim Cotter threw fourth rocks. The team finished round robin play with a 2–5 record, missing the championship pool.

== Personal life ==
Wood is the co-owner of Nufloors Penticton with his wife Annette Wood.

== Teams ==
Season	Skip	Third	Second	Lead	Alternate
2009–10	Tyrel Griffith	Darren Nelson	Brad Wood	Darin Gerow	
2010–11	Tyrel Griffith	Darren Nelson	Brad Wood	Darin Gerow	
2011–12	Darren Nelson (Fourth)	Brad Wood (Skip)	Darin Gerow	Cal Jackson	
2012–13	Deane Horning	Don Freschi	Rob Nobert	Brad Wood	Kevin Nesbitt
2018–19	Jim Cotter	Steve Laycock	Tyrel Griffith	Rick Sawatsky	Brad Wood
2019–20	Brad Wood	Matt Tolley	Nathan Small	John Slattery	
2020–21	Brad Wood	Matt Tolley	Cam Watt	John Slattery	
2021–22	Sean Geall	Brad Wood	Steve Kopf	Andrew Bilesky	
2022–23	Sean Geall	Brad Wood	Mitchell Kopytko	Darin Gerow	
2023–24	Dave Belway	Brad Wood	Michael Longworth	Darin Gerow	
2025–26	Jim Cotter (Fourth)	Connor Deane	Tim March	Brad Wood (Skip)	
2026–27	Jim Cotter	Jared Kolomaya	Connor Deane	Erik Colwell	Brad Wood
