= Jim Cotter (curler) =

Canadian curler

- Curler
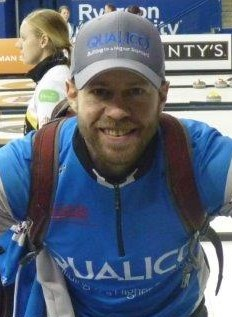
- Cotter at the 2017 Players' Championship
- Born: October 15, 1974 (age 52); Kamloops, British Columbia, Canada

Team
- Curling club: Vernon CC, Vernon, BC
- Skip: Jim Cotter
- Third: Jared Kolomaya
- Second: Connor Deane
- Lead: Erik Colwell
- Alternate: Brad Wood
- Mixed doubles partner: Jaelyn Cotter

Curling career
- Member Association: British Columbia
- Brier: 10 (2008, 2011, 2012, 2014, 2015, 2016, 2017, 2019, 2020, 2021)
- Pan Continental Championship: 1 (2023)
- Top CTRS ranking: 8th (2013–14; 2016–17)
- Grand Slam victories: 1 (2017 Elite 10)
Medal record
Men's curling
Representing Canada
Pan Continental Championships
Gold medal – first place	2023 Kelowna
Representing British Columbia
Canadian Olympic Curling Trials
Silver medal – second place	2013 Winnipeg
Tim Hortons Brier
Silver medal – second place	2014 Kamloops

James H. Cotter (born October 15, 1974 in Kamloops, British Columbia) is a Canadian curler from Vernon, British Columbia. He currently skips his own team.

== Career ==
Cotter grew up in Kamloops, playing both curling and baseball as a youth. As a high school student, he won three provincial high school championships (1990, 1991, 1993). He won two provincial junior crowns, in 1990 and in 1995. At the 1990 Canadian Junior Curling Championships, he skipped the B.C. team to a 6-5 round robin record. This put them in a five-way tie for third place. They would be eliminated from the playoffs however, when they lost their first tie-breaker match to Nova Scotia's Brian Fowlie. Five years later in his last year of eligibility, Cotter was back, skipping the B.C. team at the 1995 Canadian Junior Curling Championships. This time, he would finish with a better, 7-4 record, but it was only good enough for fourth place, and they missed the playoffs.

After juniors, Cotter would team up with two-time world champion Pat Ryan. Cotter would throw fourth stones for the team, while Ryan called the shots. The team qualified for the 2005 Canadian Olympic Curling Trials, where they went 5-4, missing the playoffs.

After playing with Ryan, Cotter joined up with Bob Ursel. Just like for the Ryan rink, Cotter would throw fourth stones, but let Ursel call the games. This rink won the provincial championship in 2008, qualifying them for the 2008 Tim Hortons Brier in Winnipeg. The team finished with a 7-4 round robin record, but lost to Ontario's Glenn Howard in the 3 vs. 4 playoff match.

Cotter would move up to the skip position for much of the 2010-11 season, while Ursel was nursing a knee injury. The team qualified for the 2011 Tim Hortons Brier without Ursel. They finished with a 4-7 record.

Ursel decided to not play for the following season (and has not played competitively since), and Cotter took control as skip for the full 2011–12 season. Cotter once again skipped Team British Columbia at the Brier in 2012, leading the team to a 4–7 record.

On May 1, 2013, Cotter announced that Olympic champion John Morris would join the team for the 2013–14 season, with Morris as skip, and Cotter throwing last stones. The team managed to win the 2013 Canadian Olympic Curling Pre-Trials, defeating Brad Jacobs in the final, qualifying the rink for the 2013 Canadian Olympic Curling Trials. There, they went on a run, finishing with a 4–3 record, and qualifying for the playoffs. In the playoffs, they defeated 2010 Olympic gold medallist Kevin Martin in the semifinal, facing them off against Team Jacobs once again, who had also qualified through the pre-trials. This time, they could not beat Jacobs, and Jacobs went on to win a gold medal for Canada at the 2014 Winter Olympics. The team had success at the 2014 Tim Hortons Brier, finishing the round robin in a three-way tie for first place with a 9–2 record. In the playoffs, the team won the 1 vs. 2 game against Alberta, skipped by Kevin Koe. This put them in the final where they would play Koe again. They could not beat Koe a second time, and had to settle for second place.

In 2014, Morris left the team, and Cotter resumed skipping responsibilities. Cotter led British Columbia to a 5–6 record at the 2015 Brier and a 3–8 record at the 2016 Brier. In 2016, Morris re-joined the team as their import player, and once again skipped the rink, while Cotter threw fourth stones. The team made it to the 2017 Brier, where they finished with a 7–4 record, but this was not enough to make it to the playoffs. A week later, the team won the 2017 Elite 10 Grand Slam event, Cotter's only career Grand Slam championship to-date. The next season, Morris and Cotter switched positions, with Morris remaining as skip. The team was one of the two qualifiers out of the 2017 Canadian Olympic Curling Pre-Trials. This qualified the team to play in the 2017 Canadian Olympic Curling Trials, where they went 3–5. Morris left the team mid-season.

Cotter coached the South Korean mixed doubles team at the 2018 Winter Olympics.

In 2018, Saskatchewan native Steve Laycock joined the team at third, with Cotter skipping. The team represented B.C. at the 2019 Tim Hortons Brier, where after going 4–3 in the preliminary round, the team lost all of their championship round games, settling for a 4–7 record (8th place). The next season, Laycock took over as skip, be remained at third. At the 2020 Tim Hortons Brier, the team went 2–5 in the preliminary round, and did not qualify for the championship round.

Due to the COVID-19 pandemic in British Columbia, the 2021 provincial championship was cancelled. As the reigning provincial champions, Team Laycock was invited to represent British Columbia at the 2021 Tim Hortons Brier, which they accepted. At the Brier, the team finished with a 3–5 record.

=== Mixed doubles ===
Cotter played mixed doubles with his daughter Jaelyn for the first time at the 2016 BC Mixed Doubles Championship. Only entering the event as a warmup for the BC Winter Games, the pair got on a roll, eventually winning the provincial title. Representing British Columbia at the 2016 Canadian Mixed Doubles Curling Trials, the father and daughter pair finished with a respectable 4–3 record, just one game short of the playoff round. The following year, the duo were given an open entry spot to the 2017 Canadian Mixed Doubles Curling Championship. After again finishing 4–3 in the preliminary round, they lost in a tiebreaker to Kim and Wayne Tuck and were eliminated.

The Cotter's continued playing doubles together for the next few years. In 2022, they reached their first final at the Nufloors Vernon MD Curling Classic where they lost to Alyssa Kyllo and Cotter's longtime teammate Tyrel Griffith. They followed this up with a semifinal finish at the Aly Jenkins Memorial, losing out once again to Griffith and Nancy Martin. The next season, the pair made it to another final at the Chilliwack Championship, dropping an 8–3 decision to Estonia's Marie Kaldvee and Harri Lill. Despite again failing to win the provincial championship, the pairs consistent playoff appearances in seven of their nine events earned them enough points to qualify for their third Canadian Mixed Doubles Championship. In Fredericton, the Cotter's reached the playoffs for the first time with a 4–3 record, going on to lose 7–3 in the round of 12 to Madison and Rylan Kleiter. Still, their strong tour season ranked them fifteenth in the world at the conclusion of the 2023–24 season.

During the 2024–25 season, Jaelyn and Jim played in all three qualifiers for the 2025 Canadian Mixed Doubles Curling Olympic Trials, however, were unsuccessful in earning a direct berth. However, thanks to the points they accumulated from the previous two seasons, they earned the sixteenth and final spot into the Olympic Trials.

== Personal life ==
Cotter is a graduate of the University College of the Cariboo, and attended Norkam Secondary School in Kamloops. He currently owns Healthcare Advanced Reporting. He is married to Bobbi Cotter and has three children.

== Teams ==
Season	Skip	Third	Second	Lead	Events
1996–97	Robert Kuroyama	Jim Cotter	Kevin Miles	Neal Dustin	
1998–99	Jim Cotter	Robert Kuroyama	Kevin Miles	Neal Dustin	
1999–00	Cory Heggestad	Jim Cotter	Aron Herrick	Trevor Miyahara	
2000–01	Cory Heggestad	Jim Cotter	Aron Herrick	Trevor Miyahara	
2004–05	Jim Cotter (Fourth)	Pat Ryan (Skip)	Kevin MacKenzie	Rick Sawatsky	2005 CC
2005–06	Jim Cotter	Kevin MacKenzie	Jeff Richard	Rick Sawatsky	2006 CC
2007–08	Jim Cotter (Fourth)	Bob Ursel (Skip)	Kevin Folk	Rick Sawatsky	2008 Brier
2008–09	Jim Cotter (Fourth)	Bob Ursel (Skip)	Kevin Folk	Rick Sawatsky	2009 BC
2009–10	Jim Cotter (Fourth)	Bob Ursel (Skip)	Kevin Folk	Rick Sawatsky	2010 BC
2010–11	Jim Cotter	Ken Maskiewich	Kevin Folk	Rick Sawatsky	2011 BC, Brier
2011–12	Jim Cotter	Kevin Folk	Tyrel Griffith	Rick Sawatsky	2012 BC, Brier
2012–13	Jim Cotter	Jason Gunnlaugson	Tyrel Griffith	Rick Sawatsky	2013 BC
2013–14	Jim Cotter (Fourth)	John Morris (Skip)	Tyrel Griffith	Rick Sawatsky	2013 RTTR, COCT, 2014 BC, Brier
2014–15	Jim Cotter	Ryan Kuhn	Tyrel Griffith	Rick Sawatsky	2014 CC, 2015 BC, Brier
2015–16	Jim Cotter	Ryan Kuhn	Tyrel Griffith	Rick Sawatsky	2016 BC, Brier
2016–17	Jim Cotter (Fourth)	John Morris (Skip)	Tyrel Griffith	Rick Sawatsky	2017 BC, Brier
2017–18	Jim Cotter (Fourth/Skip)	John Morris (Skip); Catlin Schneider	Catlin Schneider; Tyrel Griffith	Tyrel Griffith; Rick Sawatsky	2017 RTTR, COCT, 2018 BC
2018–19	Jim Cotter	Steve Laycock	Tyrel Griffith	Rick Sawatsky	2019 BC, Brier
2019–20	Jim Cotter (Fourth)	Steve Laycock (Skip)	Andrew Nerpin	Rick Sawatsky	2020 BC, Brier
2020–21	Jim Cotter	Steve Laycock	Andrew Nerpin	Rick Sawatsky	2021 Brier
2021–22	Jim Cotter	Tyrel Griffith	Andrew Nerpin	Rick Sawatsky	2022 BC
2022–23	Jim Cotter	Grant Olsen	Andrew Nerpin	Rick Sawatsky	2023 BC
2025–26	Jim Cotter (Fourth)	Connor Deane	Tim March	Brad Wood	2026 BC
2026–27	Jim Cotter	Jared Kolomaya	Connor Deane	Erik Colwell	

== Grand Slam record ==
Key
C	Champion
F	Lost in Final
SF	Lost in Semifinal
QF	Lost in Quarterfinals
R16	Lost in the round of 16
Q	Did not advance to playoffs
T2	Played in Tier 2 event
DNP	Did not participate in event
N/A	Not a Grand Slam event that season

Event	2004–05	2005–06	2006–07	2007–08	2008–09	2009–10	2010–11	2011–12	2012–13	2013–14	2014–15	2015–16	2016–17	2017–18	2018–19
Masters	DNP	DNP	Q	DNP	Q	DNP	Q	Q	F	DNP	Q	F	Q	Q	DNP
Tour Challenge	—N/a											T2	QF	Q	DNP
The National	DNP	DNP	DNP	DNP	Q	Q	Q	DNP	Q	DNP	DNP	DNP	QF	Q	DNP
Canadian Open	DNP	QF	DNP	Q	Q	QF	Q	Q	QF	Q	QF	Q	SF	DNP	DNP
Elite 10	—N/a										DNP	DNP	C	DNP	DNP
Players'	Q	Q	DNP	DNP	DNP	Q	DNP	DNP	QF	DNP	DNP	DNP	Q	DNP	DNP
Champions Cup	—N/a											DNP	QF	DNP	SF
