= Andrew Nerpin =

Canadian curler (born 1986)

- Curler
- Born: November 17, 1986 (age 39); Marathon, Ontario

Team
- Curling club: Calgary Curling Club, Calgary
- Skip: Darren Moulding
- Third: Kyler Kleibrink
- Second: Andrew Nerpin
- Lead: Evan Crough

Curling career
- Member Association: Northern Ontario (2010–2011); British Columbia (2014–2025); Alberta (2025–present)
- Brier: 3 (2018, 2020, 2021)
- Top CTRS ranking: 23rd (2019–20)

Andrew Nerpin (born November 17, 1986, in Marathon, Ontario) is a Canadian curler curling out of the Calgary Curling Club, in Calgary, Alberta.

== Career ==
In 2017, Nerpin joined Sean Geall's team as a second, supporting Geall, Jeff Richard and David Harper. The team won the September 2017 King Cash Spiel. In 2018, Team Geall won the provincial championship, defeating Jim Cotter in the final in an extra end.

In 2019, Nerpin joined Steve Laycock's team out of British Columbia as second, alongside Cotter, and Rick Sawatsky. They would go on to win the provincial championship in 2020 and 2021, representing British Columbia at the 2020 and 2021 Tim Hortons Brier, where they would go on to finish 2–5 and 3–5 respectively. Nerpin then announced in 2025 that he would be joining the Darren Moulding rink in Alberta, alongside Moulding, Kyler Kleibrink, and Evan Crough.

== Personal life ==
Nerpin works as a power engineer for Imperial Oil. He is currently engaged to Erika Underhill.
