= Rick Sawatsky =

Canadian curler (born 1976)

- Curler
- Born: February 26, 1976 (age 50); Sioux Lookout, Ontario, Canada

Team
- Curling club: Kelowna CC, Kelowna, BC
- Skip: Jim Cotter
- Third: Grant Olsen
- Second: Andrew Nerpin
- Lead: Rick Sawatsky

Curling career
- Member Association: British Columbia
- Brier: 10 (2008, 2011, 2012, 2014, 2015, 2016, 2017, 2019, 2020, 2021, 2023)
- Top CTRS ranking: 8th (2013–14; 2016–17)
- Grand Slam victories: 1 (2017 Elite 10)
Medal record
Men's curling
Representing British Columbia
Canadian Olympic Curling Trials
Silver medal – second place	2013 Winnipeg
Tim Hortons Brier
Silver medal – second place	2014 Kamloops

Richard Sawatsky (born February 26, 1976) is a Canadian curler from Kelowna, British Columbia. He currently plays lead on Team Jim Cotter that curls out of the Kelowna Curling Club.

== Personal life ==
Sawatsky is employed as a water meter technician with the city of Kelowna.

== Teams ==
Season	Skip	Third	Second	Lead
2003–04	Pat Ryan	Jim Cotter	Kevin MacKenzie	Rick Sawatsky
2004–05	Pat Ryan	Jim Cotter	Kevin MacKenzie	Rick Sawatsky
2005–06	Jim Cotter (Fourth)	Pat Ryan (Skip)	Kevin MacKenzie	Rick Sawatsky
2006–07	Jim Cotter (Fourth)	Pat Ryan (Skip)	Kevin MacKenzie	Rick Sawatsky
2007–08	Jim Cotter (Fourth)	Bob Ursel (Skip)	Kevin Folk	Rick Sawatsky
2008–09	Jim Cotter (Fourth)	Bob Ursel (Skip)	Kevin Folk	Rick Sawatsky
2009–10	Jim Cotter (Fourth)	Bob Ursel (Skip)	Kevin Folk	Rick Sawatsky
2010–11	Jim Cotter	Ken Maskiewich	Kevin Folk	Rick Sawatsky
2011–12	Jim Cotter	Kevin Folk	Tyrel Griffith	Rick Sawatsky
2012–13	Jim Cotter	Jason Gunnlaugson	Tyrel Griffith	Rick Sawatsky
2013–14	Jim Cotter (Fourth)	John Morris (Skip)	Tyrel Griffith	Rick Sawatsky
2014–15	Jim Cotter	Ryan Kuhn	Tyrel Griffith	Rick Sawatsky
2015–16	Jim Cotter	Ryan Kuhn	Tyrel Griffith	Rick Sawatsky
2016–17	Jim Cotter (Fourth)	John Morris (Skip)	Tyrel Griffith	Rick Sawatsky
2017–18	Jim Cotter	Catlin Schneider	Tyrel Griffith	Rick Sawatsky
2018–19	Jim Cotter	Steve Laycock	Tyrel Griffith	Rick Sawatsky
2019–20	Jim Cotter (Fourth)	Steve Laycock (Skip)	Andrew Nerpin	Rick Sawatsky
2020–21	Jim Cotter (Fourth)	Steve Laycock (Skip)	Andrew Nerpin	Rick Sawatsky
2021–22	Jim Cotter	Tyrel Griffith	Andrew Nerpin	Rick Sawatsky
2022–23	Jim Cotter	Grant Olsen	Andrew Nerpin	Rick Sawatsky
