= Bob Nicol =

Canadian male curler

- Curler ♂

Team
- Curling club: Fort William CC, Thunder Bay, ON

Curling career
- Member Association: Northern Ontario
- Brier: 3: (1980, 1981, 1982)
- World Championship: 1 (1982)
Medal record
Curling
Representing Canada
World Championships
Gold medal – first place	1982 Garmisch-Partenkirchen
Labatt Brier
Representing Northern Ontario
Gold medal – first place	1982 Brandon
Silver medal – second place	1980 Calgary
Silver medal – second place	1981 Halifax

Robert B. Nicol is a Canadian curler from Thunder Bay, Ontario. He is a 1982 World Men's champion and a 1982 Brier champion.

== Awards ==
- Canadian Curling Hall of Fame: 1988
- Northwestern Ontario Sports Hall of Fame: 1988

== Teams ==
Season	Skip	Third	Second	Lead	Alternate	Events
1975–76	Rick Lang	Bob Nicol	Al Fiskar, Jr.	Warren Butters		Brier 1976 (7th)
1979–80	Al Hackner	Rick Lang	Bob Nicol	Bruce Kennedy		Brier 1980 (silver)
1980–81	Al Hackner	Rick Lang	Bob Nicol	Bruce Kennedy		Brier 1981 (silver)
1981–82	Al Hackner	Rick Lang	Bob Nicol	Bruce Kennedy	Al Fiskar (WCC)	Brier 1982 (gold); WCC 1982 (gold)
