= Al Fiskar =

Canadian curler and coach

- Curler ♂
- Born: April 4, 1928; Port Arthur, Ontario
- Died: December 16, 2013 (aged 85); Thunder Bay, Ontario

Team
- Curling club: Fort William CC, Thunder Bay, ON

Curling career
- Member Association: Northern Ontario
- World Championship: 1 (1982)
Medal record
Curling
Representing Canada
World Championships
Gold medal – first place	1982 Garmisch-Partenkirchen

Allan Wilho "Al" Fiskar (April 4, 1928 – December 16, 2013) was a Canadian curler and coach from Thunder Bay, Ontario. He was a 1982 World Men's champion.

== Teams ==
Season	Skip	Third	Second	Lead	Alternate	Coach	Events
1981–82	Al Hackner	Rick Lang	Bob Nicol	Bruce Kennedy	Al Fiskar	Al Fiskar	WCC 1982 (gold)

== Record as a coach of national teams ==
Year	Tournament, event	National team	Place
1982	1982 World Men's Curling Championship	Canada (men)	1st place, gold medalist(s)

== Personal life ==
Fiskar grew up in Kaministiquia and Fort William (now Thunder Bay), and was the son of Emil and Mary Fiskar. He attended Selkirk High School. He worked as a journeyman electrician. He was married to Marion and had three children. His son Al Fiskar Jr. (Allan "Al" Fiskar Jr.) is also a curler, played second with Rick Lang on Brier 1976.
