= 1993 Seagram's VO Cup =

- Host city: Calgary, Alberta
- Arena: Calgary Curling Club
- Dates: February 17–21
- Winner: (Ontario) Team Howard
- Curling club: Penetanguishene CC, Penetanguishene
- Skip: Russ Howard
- Third: Glenn Howard
- Second: Wayne Middaugh
- Lead: Peter Corner
- Finalist: (Ontario) Paul Savage

The 1993 Seagram's VO Cup, was the first edition of the Players' Championship, the championship tournament for the inaugural season of the World Curling Tour. It was held February 17–21, 1993 at the Calgary Curling Club in Calgary, Alberta. The total purse for the event was $120,000, with the winning team receiving $40,000.

The semifinals and finals were broadcast on TSN.

The event featured the "free guard zone", wherein the first three rocks of an end couldn't be removed if they were in the guard zone. This rule would later be adopted into the official rules of curling.

In an all-Ontario final, Russ Howard of Penetanguishene won his first of two Players' Championships, defeating Paul Savage of Toronto, 8–2.

== Qualification ==
The top 30 men's teams on the "V.O. Cup standings" as of December 31, 1992 qualified for the event based on results from Tour events that season, along with the winner of a qualifying event and a sponsor's exemption. Adrian Bakker of Calgary qualified through winning the preliminary event and Tormod Andreassen of Norway was the sponsor's exemption.

=== V.O. Cup standings ===
Top 30 teams on the V.O. Cup standings, as of January 6, 1993. Struck out teams declined their invitation or were not registered. Teams ranked "x" were substitutes.

Rank	Skip	Locale	Points
1	Ed Werenich	Toronto, Ontario	323
2	Vic Peters	Winnipeg, Manitoba	241
3	Ed Lukowich	Calgary, Alberta	233
4	Russ Howard	Penetanguishene, Ontario	220
5	Kevin Martin	Edmonton, Alberta	170
6	Mark Dacey	Saskatoon, Saskatchewan	156
7	~~Rick Folk~~	Kelowna, British Columbia	123
8	Bryan Derbowka	Yorkton, Saskatchewan	122
9	Eugene Hritzuk	Saskatoon, Saskatchewan	121
10	John Bubbs	Winnipeg, Manitoba	116
10	Markus Eggler	Basel, Switzerland	116
12	Al Hackner	Thunder Bay, Ontario	111
13	Harold Breckenridge	Calgary, Alberta	95
14	~~David Smith~~	Scotland	90
15	Kerry Burtnyk	Winnipeg, Manitoba	86
15	~~Eigil Ramsfjell~~	Norway	86
17	Lorne Campbell	Peace River, Alberta	84
18	Ron Gauthier	Winnipeg, Manitoba	81
19	Rob Ewen	Jansen, Saskatchewan	77
20	Jeff Ryan	Winnipeg, Manitoba	75
20	Arnold Anderson	Shellbrook, Saskatchewan	75
22	Brent Giles	Vancouver, British Columbia	67
22	Mike Harris	Toronto, Ontario	67
24	~~Jim Armstrong~~	Vancouver, British Columbia	58
24	Rob Schlender	Leduc, Alberta	58
26	~~Jim Sharples~~	Toronto, Ontario	57
27	Paul Savage	Toronto, Ontario	56
27	Brad Heidt	Kerrobert, Saskatchewan	56
29	~~Mike Vavrek~~	Grande Prairie, Alberta	53
29	Rick Lang	Thunder Bay, Ontario	53
X	Mickey Pendergast	Calgary, Alberta	49
X	John Base	Oakville, Ontario	45
X	Don Walchuk	Edmonton, Alberta	45

After further drop outs, Doran Johnson of Lethbridge, Alberta, Bill Adams of Thunder Bay and Ron Mills of Saskatoon were invited to play, replacing Folk, Armstrong and Vavrek.

== Qualifying event ==
One team qualified by winning the Acadia Recreational Complex cash bonspiel. The event was held at the Acadia Recreational Complex from January 29-31, in Calgary, and came with a purse of $10,500, and a top prize of $3,000. The winning team of Adrian Bakker, Jim Lautner, Ron Riggall and Scott Rankin of Calgary won the event, defeating Ken McLean of Regina, Saskatchewan in the final.

== Knockout rounds ==
The scores were as follows:

=== A event ===
First Knockout
(Alberta) Harold Breckenridge	7
(Norway) Tormod Andreassen	6
(Alberta) Kevin Martin	7
(Alberta) Don Walchuk	6
(Ontario) Russ Howard	7
(Ontario) Mike Harris	2
(Manitoba) Kerry Burtnyk	6
(Alberta) Doran Johnson	3
(Saskatchewan) Rob Ewen	7
(Saskatchewan) Ronald Anderson	4
(Ontario) Ed Werenich	9
(Saskatchewan) Brad Heidt	7
(Saskatchewan) Eugene Hritzuk	7
(Ontario) John Base	6
(Alberta) Rob Schlender	7
(Switzerland) Markus Eggler	6

Quarterfinals
(Alberta) Harold Breckenridge	8
(Alberta) Kevin Martin	7
(Ontario) Russ Howard	8
(Manitoba) Kerry Burtnyk	7
(Saskatchewan) Rob Ewen	8
(Ontario) Ed Werenich	6
(Saskatchewan) Eugene Hritzuk	7
(Alberta) Rob Schlender	4

Semifinals
(Alberta) Harold Breckenridge	6
(Ontario) Russ Howard	5
(Saskatchewan) Rob Ewen	11
(Saskatchewan) Eugene Hritzuk	4

Qualifier 1
(Alberta) Harold Breckenridge	6
(Saskatchewan) Rob Ewen	3

First Knockout
(Saskatchewan) Mark Dacey	7
(Alberta) Adrian Bakker	3
(Ontario) Al Hackner	7
(Ontario) Rick Lang	5
(Alberta) Mickey Pendergast	8
(Alberta) Ed Lukowich	2
(Ontario) Bill Adams	8
(Alberta) Lorne Campbell	5
(Saskatchewan) Bryan Derbowka	5
(Ontario) Paul Savage	4
(British Columbia) Brent Giles	8
(Manitoba) John Bubbs	1
(Manitoba) Vic Peters	9
(Manitoba) Jeff Ryan	7
(Saskatchewan) Ron Mills	9
(Manitoba) Ron Gauthier	7

Quarterfinals
(Saskatchewan) Mark Dacey	10
(Ontario) Al Hackner	4
(Alberta) Mickey Pendergast	8
(Ontario) Bill Adams	4
(Saskatchewan) Bryan Derbowka	6
(British Columbia) Brent Giles	4
(Manitoba) Vic Peters	7
(Saskatchewan) Ron Mills	4

Semifinals
(Saskatchewan) Mark Dacey	5
(Alberta) Mickey Pendergast	2
(Saskatchewan) Bryan Derbowka	5
(Manitoba) Vic Peters	4

Qualifier 2
(Saskatchewan) Mark Dacey	7
(Saskatchewan) Bryan Derbowka	5

=== B Event ===
Second Knockout
(Saskatchewan) Brad Heidt	10
(Saskatchewan) Ronald Anderson	9
(Ontario) John Base	11
(Switzerland) Markus Eggler	8
(Norway) Tormod Andreassen	5
(Alberta) Don Walchuk	4
(Alberta) Doran Johnson	7
(Ontario) Mike Harris	3

Round 2
(Alberta) Kevin Martin	6
(Saskatchewan) Brad Heidt	5
(Manitoba) Kerry Burtnyk	6
(Ontario) John Base	5
(Ontario) Ed Werenich	10
(Norway) Tormod Andreassen	3
(Alberta) Doran Johnson	8
(Alberta) Rob Schlender	4

Quarterfinals
(Alberta) Kevin Martin	6
(Manitoba) Kerry Burtnyk	2
(Ontario) Ed Werenich	7
(Alberta) Mickey Pendergast	6
(Alberta) Doran Johnson	8
(Manitoba) Vic Peters	6

Semifinals
(Saskatchewan) Rob Ewen	7
(Alberta) Kevin Martin	5
(Ontario) Ed Werenich	7
(Alberta) Doran Johnson	6

Qualifier 3
(Saskatchewan) Rob Ewen	6
(Ontario) Ed Werenich	5

Second Knockout
(Alberta) Ed Lukowich	6
(Alberta) Lorne Campbell	4
(Alberta) Adrian Bakker	10
(Ontario) Rick Lang	6
(Ontario) Paul Savage	8
(Manitoba) John Bubbs	3
(Manitoba) Ron Gauthier	6
(Manitoba) Jeff Ryan	5

Round 2
(Alberta) Ed Lukowich	9
(British Columbia) Brent Giles	5
(Saskatchewan) Ron Mills	6
(Alberta) Adrian Bakker	4
(Ontario) Bill Adams	6
(Ontario) Paul Savage	5
(Ontario) Al Hackner	10
(Manitoba) Ron Gauthier	2

Quarterfinals
(Alberta) Ed Lukowich	8
(Ontario) Russ Howard	6
(Saskatchewan) Ron Mills	8
(Saskatchewan) Eugene Hritzuk	6
(Ontario) Bill Adams	9
(Ontario) Al Hackner	0

Semifinals
(Alberta) Ed Lukowich	10
(Saskatchewan) Ron Mills	2
(Ontario) Bill Adams	8
(Saskatchewan) Bryan Derbowka	3

Qualifier 4
(Alberta) Ed Lukowich	7
(Ontario) Bill Adams	6

=== C Event ===
Third Knockout
(Manitoba) John Bubbs	7
(Manitoba) Jeff Ryan	5
(Norway) Tormod Andreassen	9
(Alberta) Rob Schlender	5

Quarterfinals
(Manitoba) Kerry Burtnyk	7
(Norway) Tormod Andreassen	4
(Alberta) Mickey Pendergast	6
(Manitoba) John Bubbs	5

Semifinals
(Manitoba) Kerry Burtnyk	9
(Saskatchewan) Ron Mills	8
(Alberta) Mickey Pendergast	9
(Alberta) Kevin Martin	5

Qualifier 5
(Manitoba) Kerry Burtnyk	7
(Alberta) Mickey Pendergast	4

Third Knockout
(Alberta) Lorne Campbell	8
(Ontario) Rick Lang	4

Quarterfinals
(Ontario) John Base	7
(Saskatchewan) Brad Heidt	6
(Manitoba) Vic Peters	10
(Alberta) Lorne Campbell	4

Semifinals
(Ontario) John Base	10
(Manitoba) Vic Peters	8

Qualifier 6
(Ontario) John Base	6
(Ontario) Bill Adams	5

Third Knockout
(Switzerland) Markus Eggler	9
(Saskatchewan) Ronald Anderson	2
(Alberta) Adrian Bakker	9
(British Columbia) Brent Giles	6

Quarterfinals
(Ontario) Russ Howard	8
(Switzerland) Markus Eggler	1
(Ontario) Al Hackner	8
(Alberta) Adrian Bakker	6

Semifinals
(Ontario) Russ Howard	8
(Ontario) Al Hackner	0

Qualifier 7
(Ontario) Russ Howard	8
(Ontario) Ed Werenich	7

Third Knockout
(Ontario) Mike Harris	7
(Alberta) Don Walchuk	4

Quarterfinals
(Ontario) Paul Savage	9
(Manitoba) Ron Gauthier	8
(Saskatchewan) Eugene Hritzuk	8
(Ontario) Mike Harris	3

Semifinals
(Ontario) Paul Savage	10
(Alberta) Doran Johnson	7
(Saskatchewan) Eugene Hritzuk	7
(Saskatchewan) Bryan Derbowka	2

Qualifier 8
(Ontario) Paul Savage	5
(Saskatchewan) Eugene Hritzuk	4

== Playoffs ==
Quarterfinals
(Alberta) Harold Breckenridge	6
(Ontario) Russ Howard	10
(Saskatchewan) Rob Ewen	11
(Manitoba) Kerry Burtnyk	5
(Saskatchewan) Mark Dacey	8
(Ontario) John Base	3
(Alberta) Ed Lukowich	6
(Ontario) Paul Savage	7

Semifinals
(Ontario) Russ Howard	9
(Saskatchewan) Rob Ewen	7
(Saskatchewan) Mark Dacey	5
(Ontario) Paul Savage	7

Finals
(Ontario) Russ Howard	8
(Ontario) Paul Savage	2

=== Quarter-finals ===
Team	1	2	3	4	5	6	7	8	9	10	Final
(Alberta) Harold Breckenridge	1	0	0	3	0	1	0	1	0	X	6
(Ontario) Russ Howard	0	1	2	0	3	0	1	0	3	X	10

Team	1	2	3	4	5	6	7	8	9	10	Final
(Alberta) Ed Lukowich	1	0	1	0	0	2	1	0	1	0	6
(Ontario) Paul Savage	0	2	0	1	1	0	0	1	0	2	7

Team	1	2	3	4	5	6	7	8	9	10	Final
(Ontario) John Base	1	0	1	0	0	0	0	1	0	X	3
(Saskatchewan) Mark Dacey	0	2	0	0	2	1	1	0	2	X	8

Team	1	2	3	4	5	6	7	8	9	10	Final
(Saskatchewan) Rob Ewen	1	0	0	5	0	2	0	3	X	X	11
(Manitoba) Kerry Burtnyk	0	1	0	0	2	0	2	0	X	X	5

=== Semifinals ===
Team	1	2	3	4	5	6	7	8	9	10	Final
(Saskatchewan) Mark Dacey	0	0	0	0	2	0	2	0	1	0	5
(Ontario) Paul Savage	0	0	0	3	0	1	0	2	0	1	7

Team	1	2	3	4	5	6	7	8	9	10	Final
(Ontario) Russ Howard	1	0	0	3	0	2	0	0	3	X	9
(Saskatchewan) Rob Ewen	0	0	1	0	2	0	0	1	0	X	7

=== Final ===
Team	1	2	3	4	5	6	7	8	9	10	Final
(Ontario) Russ Howard	1	0	1	0	3	1	1	1	X	X	8
(Ontario) Paul Savage	0	1	0	1	0	0	0	0	X	X	2
