= Bruce Kennedy (curler) =

Canadian male curler

- Curler ♂
- Born: 1948 or 1949 (age 77–78)

Team
- Curling club: Fort William CC, Thunder Bay, ON

Curling career
- Member Association: Northern Ontario
- Brier: 6: (1980, 1981, 1982, 1985, 1987, 1995)
- World Championship: 1 (1982)
Medal record
Curling
Representing Canada
World Championships
Gold medal – first place	1982 Garmisch-Partenkirchen
Labatt Brier
Representing Northern Ontario
Gold medal – first place	1982 Brandon
Gold medal – first place	1985 Moncton
Silver medal – second place	1980 Calgary
Silver medal – second place	1981 Halifax

Bruce Kennedy is a Canadian curler from Thunder Bay, Ontario. He is a 1982 World Men's champion and a two-time Brier champion (1982, 1985).

== Awards ==
- Canadian Curling Hall of Fame: 1988
- Northwestern Ontario Sports Hall of Fame: 1988

== Teams ==
Season	Skip	Third	Second	Lead	Alternate	Events
1979–80	Al Hackner	Rick Lang	Bob Nicol	Bruce Kennedy		Brier 1980 (silver)
1980–81	Al Hackner	Rick Lang	Bob Nicol	Bruce Kennedy		Brier 1981 (silver)
1981–82	Al Hackner	Rick Lang	Bob Nicol	Bruce Kennedy	Al Fiskar (WCC)	Brier 1982 (gold); WCC 1982 (gold)
1984–85	Al Hackner	Rick Lang	Ian Tetley	Pat Perroud	Bruce Kennedy	Brier 1985 (gold)
1986–87	Larry Pineau	Jack Kallos	Brian Snell	Bruce Kennedy	Ray Skillen	Brier 1987 (8th)
1994–95	Al Hackner	Rick Lang	Aaron Skillen	Art Lappalainen	Bruce Kennedy	Brier 1995 (7th)
1998–99	Al Hackner	Rick Lang	Bryan Burgess	Bruce Kennedy		
1999–00	Al Hackner	Dave Merklinger	Bryan Burgess	Bruce Kennedy		
2003–04	Rick Lang	Alan Laine	Bruce Kennedy	Brian Adams		CSCC 2004 (10th)

== Personal life ==
He is married with Tracy Kennedy, Canadian and World curling champion. He was employed as a locomotive engineer.
