= 1982 Labatt Brier =

- Host city: Brandon, Manitoba
- Arena: Keystone Centre
- Dates: March 7–14
- Attendance: 106,394
- Winner: Northern Ontario
- Curling club: Fort William CC, Thunder Bay
- Skip: Al Hackner
- Third: Rick Lang
- Second: Bob Nicol
- Lead: Bruce Kennedy
- Finalist: British Columbia (Brent Giles)

The 1982 Labatt Brier, the Canadian men's curling championship was held from March 7 to 14, 1982 at the Keystone Centre in Brandon, Manitoba. The total attendance for the week was 106,394, which was the first Brier to be attended by over 100,000 spectators.

After losing in the Brier final the previous two years, Al Hackner, who skipped Team Northern Ontario finally captured the Brier tankard in the third straight final appearance after defeating British Columbia, skipped by Brent Giles in the final 7–3. Northern Ontario advanced to the final after defeating Manitoba 8–5 in the semifinal. This was Northern Ontario's third Brier championship and the first of two titles skipped by Hackner.

The Hackner rink would go onto represent Canada in the 1982 Air Canada Silver Broom, the men's world curling championship held in Garmisch-Partenkirchen, Germany which they captured the world championship as well.

Manitoba's 6–5 victory over New Brunswick in Draw 2 and British Columbia's 7–6 victory over Northern Ontario in Draw 12 were the sixth and seventh instances in which a game went into a second extra end in the Brier. This was also only the second Brier to feature multiple double extra end games, with the other occurring in 1965.

== Teams ==
The teams were listed as follows:

Alberta	British Columbia	Manitoba
Grande Prairie CC, Grande Prairie Skip: Gary Morken; Third: Dennis Graber; Second: Richard Maksymetz; Lead: Murray Gummer	Vancouver CC, Vancouver Skip: Brent Giles; Third: Greg Monkman; Second: Al Roemer; Lead: Brad Giles	Souris CC, Souris Skip: Mel Logan; Third: Doug Armour; Second: Lloyd Lang; Lead: Allan Granger
New Brunswick	Newfoundland	Northern Ontario
Capital WC, Fredericton Skip: Charlie Sullivan; Third: Dave Sullivan; Second: Shelly Palk; Lead: Robert Cormier	St. John's CC, St. John's Skip: Mark Noseworthy; Third: Randy Perry; Second: Eugene Trickett; Lead: John Wheeler	Fort William CC, Thunder Bay Skip: Al Hackner; Third: Rick Lang; Second: Bob Nicol; Lead: Bruce Kennedy
Nova Scotia	Ontario	Prince Edward Island
Dartmouth CC, Dartmouth Skip: Lowell Goulden; Third: Peter MacPhee; Second: Bruce MacArthur; Lead: David Wallace	Forest City CC, London Skip: Bruce Munro; Third: Bob Laidlaw; Second: Clive Bowden; Lead: Bruce Paterson	Charlottetown CC, Charlottetown Skip: Peter Jenkins; Third: Doug Weeks; Second: Peter Gallant; Lead: Roy Rodd
Quebec	Saskatchewan	Yukon/Northwest Territories
CFB St-Jean CC, Saint-Jean-sur-Richelieu Skip: Don Aitken; Third: Earle Morris; Second: Lawren Steventon; Lead: Malcolm Turner	Kerrobert CC, Kerrobert Skip: Brad Heidt; Third: Wayne Charteris; Second: John Whetter; Lead: Warren Rechenmacher	Takhini CC, Whitehorse Skip: Paul Hunter; Third: John Yeulet; Second: Gabriel Aucoin; Lead: Ross Birnie

== Map of teams ==
Provincial Winners

== Round-robin standings ==
Final Round Robin standings

Key
Teams to Playoffs
Teams to Tiebreakers

Province	Skip	W	L	PF	PA	EW	EL	BE	SE
British Columbia	Brent Giles	9	2	68	51	42	38	8	14
Northern Ontario	Al Hackner	8	3	82	51	50	40	6	22
Manitoba	Mel Logan	6	5	71	64	44	41	8	16
New Brunswick	Charlie Sullivan	6	5	64	59	45	44	7	11
Newfoundland	Mark Noseworthy	6	5	60	57	42	45	9	6
Ontario	Bruce Munro	5	6	65	61	41	46	4	12
Alberta	Gary Morken	5	6	64	75	45	45	9	10
Nova Scotia	Lowell Goulden	5	6	71	73	47	40	5	19
Saskatchewan	Brad Heidt	5	6	58	65	38	42	19	10
Quebec	Don Aitken	5	6	63	67	44	45	5	14
Yukon/Northwest Territories	Paul Hunter	3	8	55	72	40	43	11	10
Prince Edward Island	Peter Jenkins	3	8	47	73	37	46	12	6

== Round-robin results ==
All draw times are listed in Central Standard Time (UTC-06:00).

=== Draw 1 ===
Sunday, March 7, 1:00 pm

Sheet A	1	2	3	4	5	6	7	8	9	10	Final
Manitoba (Logan)	0	3	1	0	0	0	2	0	0	0	6
Northern Ontario (Hackner) 🔨	2	0	0	0	1	1	0	1	1	1	7

Sheet B	1	2	3	4	5	6	7	8	9	10	11	Final
Saskatchewan (Heidt)	1	1	0	1	1	1	0	0	1	0	3	9
Quebec (Aitken) 🔨	0	0	2	0	0	0	2	0	0	2	0	6

Sheet C	1	2	3	4	5	6	7	8	9	10	Final
New Brunswick (Sullivan)	0	1	0	1	1	0	2	0	3	X	8
Alberta (Morken) 🔨	2	0	0	0	0	1	0	2	0	X	5

Sheet D	1	2	3	4	5	6	7	8	9	10	Final
Nova Scotia (Goulden)	1	0	1	0	0	0	3	1	0	X	6
Ontario (Munro) 🔨	0	3	0	3	2	3	0	0	3	X	14

Sheet E	1	2	3	4	5	6	7	8	9	10	Final
Yukon/Northwest Territories (Hunter)	0	0	1	0	1	0	1	0	0	X	3
Newfoundland (Noseworthy) 🔨	0	1	0	2	0	3	0	2	1	X	9

=== Draw 2 ===
Sunday, March 7, 7:30 pm

Sheet A	1	2	3	4	5	6	7	8	9	10	Final
Yukon/Northwest Territories (Hunter)	0	0	0	0	0	1	0	1	0	X	2
Ontario (Munro) 🔨	2	0	0	0	1	0	1	0	2	X	6

Sheet B	1	2	3	4	5	6	7	8	9	10	Final
Alberta (Morken) 🔨	0	2	0	1	0	2	2	1	0	X	8
Nova Scotia (Goulden)	2	0	1	0	3	0	0	0	1	X	7

Sheet C	1	2	3	4	5	6	7	8	9	10	Final
Northern Ontario (Hackner) 🔨	4	0	0	1	0	1	1	0	0	X	7
Newfoundland (Noseworthy)	0	1	0	0	0	0	0	0	2	X	3

Sheet D	1	2	3	4	5	6	7	8	9	10	11	12	Final
Manitoba (Logan)	0	1	0	0	0	1	1	1	1	0	0	1	6
New Brunswick (Sullivan) 🔨	1	0	1	1	0	0	0	0	0	2	0	0	5

Sheet E	1	2	3	4	5	6	7	8	9	10	Final
British Columbia (Giles)	0	1	1	0	0	2	0	3	0	X	7
Prince Edward Island (Jenkins) 🔨	0	0	0	0	0	0	1	0	1	X	2

=== Draw 3 ===
Monday, March 8, 9:00 am

Sheet C	1	2	3	4	5	6	7	8	9	10	Final
Alberta (Morken) 🔨	2	0	0	0	0	0	0	3	2	0	7
Manitoba (Logan)	0	0	2	2	3	0	0	0	0	1	8

Sheet D	1	2	3	4	5	6	7	8	9	10	Final
New Brunswick (Sullivan) 🔨	0	1	0	0	1	0	0	0	2	X	4
Northern Ontario (Hackner)	0	0	2	1	0	2	0	1	0	X	6

=== Draw 4 ===
Monday, March 8, 1:30 pm

Sheet A	1	2	3	4	5	6	7	8	9	10	Final
New Brunswick (Sullivan)	0	1	0	0	0	0	2	0	0	X	3
Nova Scotia (Goulden) 🔨	2	0	0	1	2	0	0	1	1	X	7

Sheet B	1	2	3	4	5	6	7	8	9	10	Final
Newfoundland (Noseworthy)	0	2	0	1	0	0	1	0	1	0	5
British Columbia (Giles) 🔨	0	0	2	0	0	2	0	1	0	1	6

Sheet C	1	2	3	4	5	6	7	8	9	10	Final
Ontario (Munro)	0	0	0	0	3	0	1	0	1	X	5
Quebec (Aitken) 🔨	1	1	2	0	0	1	0	1	0	X	6

Sheet D	1	2	3	4	5	6	7	8	9	10	Final
Yukon/Northwest Territories (Hunter)	1	1	0	2	0	1	0	0	0	1	6
Prince Edward Island (Jenkins) 🔨	0	0	2	0	1	0	1	1	0	0	5

Sheet E	1	2	3	4	5	6	7	8	9	10	Final
Alberta (Morken)	0	0	0	1	0	2	0	1	0	X	4
Saskatchewan (Heidt) 🔨	0	0	1	0	3	0	1	0	2	X	7

=== Draw 5 ===
Monday, March 8, 7:30 pm

Sheet A	1	2	3	4	5	6	7	8	9	10	Final
Quebec (Aitken)	0	0	1	0	1	0	0	1	1	0	4
Newfoundland (Noseworthy) 🔨	0	1	0	1	0	2	0	0	0	2	6

Sheet B	1	2	3	4	5	6	7	8	9	10	Final
Prince Edward Island (Jenkins) 🔨	1	0	0	0	0	1	0	0	1	1	4
Ontario (Munro)	0	1	0	0	1	0	1	0	0	0	3

Sheet C	1	2	3	4	5	6	7	8	9	10	Final
British Columbia (Giles)	0	0	0	1	1	0	4	0	0	2	8
Yukon/Northwest Territories (Hunter) 🔨	0	3	2	0	0	1	0	0	1	0	7

Sheet D	1	2	3	4	5	6	7	8	9	10	Final
Northern Ontario (Hackner)	1	1	0	4	1	2	3	0	X	X	12
Saskatchewan (Heidt) 🔨	0	0	1	0	0	0	0	1	X	X	2

Sheet E	1	2	3	4	5	6	7	8	9	10	Final
Nova Scotia (Goulden)	0	1	0	0	1	1	0	0	X	X	3
Manitoba (Logan) 🔨	1	0	2	3	0	0	5	1	X	X	12

=== Draw 6 ===
Tuesday, March 9, 9:00 am

Sheet B	1	2	3	4	5	6	7	8	9	10	Final
Nova Scotia (Goulden)	1	1	1	0	0	2	0	4	X	X	9
Yukon/Northwest Territories (Hunter) 🔨	0	0	0	0	2	0	1	0	X	X	3

Sheet C	1	2	3	4	5	6	7	8	9	10	Final
Newfoundland (Noseworthy) 🔨	1	0	1	0	1	1	0	1	0	X	5
Ontario (Munro)	0	1	0	1	0	0	1	0	1	X	4

=== Draw 7 ===
Tuesday, March 9, 1:30 pm

Sheet A	1	2	3	4	5	6	7	8	9	10	Final
Alberta (Morken)	0	1	0	2	0	0	0	1	0	2	6
Prince Edward Island (Jenkins) 🔨	2	0	1	0	1	0	0	0	1	0	5

Sheet B	1	2	3	4	5	6	7	8	9	10	Final
New Brunswick (Sullivan) 🔨	1	1	1	0	0	2	1	0	1	X	7
Newfoundland (Noseworthy)	0	0	0	1	1	0	0	1	0	X	3

Sheet C	1	2	3	4	5	6	7	8	9	10	Final
Saskatchewan (Heidt)	2	0	0	0	0	0	1	0	0	X	3
Nova Scotia (Goulden) 🔨	0	1	0	1	1	1	0	1	2	X	7

Sheet D	1	2	3	4	5	6	7	8	9	10	Final
British Columbia (Giles) 🔨	2	0	0	0	0	0	1	0	2	1	6
Manitoba (Logan)	0	0	0	1	1	0	0	3	0	0	5

Sheet E	1	2	3	4	5	6	7	8	9	10	Final
Quebec (Aitken) 🔨	0	1	0	0	2	0	0	1	X	X	4
Northern Ontario (Hackner)	2	0	1	3	0	2	2	0	X	X	10

=== Draw 8 ===
Tuesday, March 9, 7:30 pm

Sheet A	1	2	3	4	5	6	7	8	9	10	Final
Saskatchewan (Heidt)	0	0	0	0	2	1	0	0	0	1	4
British Columbia (Giles) 🔨	0	1	0	0	0	0	1	0	0	0	2

Sheet B	1	2	3	4	5	6	7	8	9	10	Final
Northern Ontario (Hackner) 🔨	1	1	2	2	0	1	0	0	0	X	7
Prince Edward Island (Jenkins)	0	0	0	0	1	0	1	0	1	X	3

Sheet C	1	2	3	4	5	6	7	8	9	10	Final
Quebec (Aitken) 🔨	3	3	0	0	0	1	0	2	1	X	10
Manitoba (Logan)	0	0	2	0	1	0	2	0	0	X	5

Sheet D	1	2	3	4	5	6	7	8	9	10	Final
Yukon/Northwest Territories (Hunter) 🔨	2	0	0	0	3	0	0	2	0	X	7
Alberta (Morken)	0	1	2	2	0	2	1	0	1	X	9

Sheet E	1	2	3	4	5	6	7	8	9	10	Final
New Brunswick (Sullivan)	0	0	1	1	0	2	0	1	1	X	6
Ontario (Munro) 🔨	0	1	0	0	1	0	1	0	0	X	3

=== Draw 9 ===
Wednesday, March 10, 9:00 am

Sheet C	1	2	3	4	5	6	7	8	9	10	Final
Saskatchewan (Heidt) 🔨	1	0	0	0	0	1	0	0	0	X	2
Prince Edward Island (Jenkins)	0	0	1	1	0	0	0	0	3	X	5

Sheet D	1	2	3	4	5	6	7	8	9	10	Final
Quebec (Aitken) 🔨	0	0	0	2	0	1	2	1	1	X	7
British Columbia (Giles)	0	0	1	0	2	0	0	0	0	X	3

=== Draw 10 ===
Wednesday, March 10, 1:30 pm

Sheet A	1	2	3	4	5	6	7	8	9	10	Final
Northern Ontario (Hackner)	0	4	0	2	0	0	0	2	0	X	8
Yukon/Northwest Territories (Hunter) 🔨	1	0	1	0	1	0	1	0	1	X	5

Sheet B	1	2	3	4	5	6	7	8	9	10	Final
Ontario (Munro)	0	0	0	0	1	0	3	0	0	X	4
Manitoba (Logan) 🔨	0	1	1	3	0	1	0	2	1	X	9

Sheet C	1	2	3	4	5	6	7	8	9	10	Final
Nova Scotia (Goulden) 🔨	0	0	1	0	1	0	2	0	0	X	4
British Columbia (Giles)	1	1	0	1	0	2	0	3	0	X	8

Sheet D	1	2	3	4	5	6	7	8	9	10	Final
New Brunswick (Sullivan) 🔨	0	1	0	2	0	3	0	0	2	X	8
Prince Edward Island (Jenkins)	1	0	1	0	2	0	0	1	0	X	5

Sheet E	1	2	3	4	5	6	7	8	9	10	Final
Newfoundland (Noseworthy) 🔨	2	0	3	0	0	1	0	0	0	1	7
Alberta (Morken)	0	2	0	1	0	0	1	0	1	0	5

=== Draw 11 ===
Wednesday, March 10, 7:30 pm

Sheet A	1	2	3	4	5	6	7	8	9	10	Final
Ontario (Munro)	0	2	1	1	0	0	5	0	1	X	10
Alberta (Morken) 🔨	1	0	0	0	2	1	0	0	0	X	4

Sheet B	1	2	3	4	5	6	7	8	9	10	Final
Quebec (Aitken)	0	1	0	0	2	0	0	0	1	X	4
New Brunswick (Sullivan) 🔨	1	0	0	1	0	0	2	1	0	X	5

Sheet C	1	2	3	4	5	6	7	8	9	10	Final
Manitoba (Logan) 🔨	1	0	0	0	0	0	1	1	0	1	4
Newfoundland (Noseworthy)	0	0	0	2	0	0	0	0	1	0	3

Sheet D	1	2	3	4	5	6	7	8	9	10	Final
Saskatchewan (Heidt)	1	0	0	5	0	0	0	0	2	X	8
Yukon/Northwest Territories (Hunter) 🔨	0	3	1	0	1	0	0	0	0	X	5

Sheet E	1	2	3	4	5	6	7	8	9	10	Final
Northern Ontario (Hackner)	0	2	2	1	0	0	1	0	3	X	9
Nova Scotia (Goulden) 🔨	2	0	0	0	0	1	0	1	0	X	4

=== Draw 12 ===
Thursday, March 11, 1:30 pm

Sheet A	1	2	3	4	5	6	7	8	9	10	Final
Nova Scotia (Goulden) 🔨	0	1	0	3	2	1	3	0	X	X	10
Quebec (Aitken)	1	0	1	0	0	0	0	2	X	X	4

Sheet B	1	2	3	4	5	6	7	8	9	10	11	12	Final
British Columbia (Giles)	0	0	1	0	2	0	0	0	3	0	0	1	7
Northern Ontario (Hackner) 🔨	2	0	0	1	0	1	1	0	0	1	0	0	6

Sheet C	1	2	3	4	5	6	7	8	9	10	Final
Ontario (Munro) 🔨	0	0	2	1	0	0	2	0	0	X	5
Saskatchewan (Heidt)	1	0	0	0	0	1	0	1	1	X	4

Sheet D	1	2	3	4	5	6	7	8	9	10	Final
Prince Edward Island (Jenkins)	0	0	2	0	0	2	0	1	0	2	7
Newfoundland (Noseworthy) 🔨	0	2	0	1	0	0	1	0	1	0	6

Sheet E	1	2	3	4	5	6	7	8	9	10	Final
Manitoba (Logan)	0	0	1	0	0	1	0	0	X	X	2
Yukon/Northwest Territories (Hunter) 🔨	1	1	0	3	1	0	1	2	X	X	9

=== Draw 13 ===
Thursday, March 11, 7:30 pm

Sheet A	1	2	3	4	5	6	7	8	9	10	Final
Newfoundland (Noseworthy) 🔨	2	0	1	1	0	0	1	0	0	1	6
Saskatchewan (Heidt)	0	2	0	0	0	1	0	1	1	0	5

Sheet B	1	2	3	4	5	6	7	8	9	10	Final
Yukon/Northwest Territories (Hunter) 🔨	0	1	0	0	2	1	0	1	0	X	5
New Brunswick (Sullivan)	0	0	1	0	0	0	1	0	2	X	4

Sheet C	1	2	3	4	5	6	7	8	9	10	Final
Prince Edward Island (Jenkins)	0	1	0	0	0	1	0	0	X	X	2
Nova Scotia (Goulden) 🔨	2	0	0	1	1	0	1	4	X	X	9

Sheet D	1	2	3	4	5	6	7	8	9	10	Final
Alberta (Morken) 🔨	1	0	2	0	1	0	2	0	0	1	7
Quebec (Aitken)	0	1	0	1	0	2	0	1	1	0	6

Sheet E	1	2	3	4	5	6	7	8	9	10	Final
Ontario (Munro) 🔨	0	0	0	0	1	2	0	1	0	X	4
British Columbia (Giles)	1	2	0	2	0	0	2	0	3	X	10

=== Draw 14 ===
Friday, March 12, 9:00 am

Sheet A	1	2	3	4	5	6	7	8	9	10	Final
Prince Edward Island (Jenkins)	0	0	0	2	0	2	0	1	0	X	5
Manitoba (Logan) 🔨	2	2	2	0	3	0	1	0	1	X	11

Sheet B	1	2	3	4	5	6	7	8	9	10	Final
British Columbia (Giles)	0	1	0	0	0	2	0	2	0	X	5
Alberta (Morken) 🔨	1	0	0	0	1	0	0	0	1	X	3

Sheet C	1	2	3	4	5	6	7	8	9	10	Final
Yukon/Northwest Territories (Hunter) 🔨	0	0	1	1	0	0	0	1	0	0	3
Quebec (Aitken)	1	1	0	0	1	0	0	0	0	1	4

Sheet D	1	2	3	4	5	6	7	8	9	10	Final
Ontario (Munro)	0	1	0	1	1	0	2	1	0	1	7
Northern Ontario (Hackner) 🔨	3	0	1	0	0	1	0	0	0	0	5

Sheet E	1	2	3	4	5	6	7	8	9	10	11	Final
Saskatchewan (Heidt)	0	0	2	0	1	0	0	3	0	3	0	9
New Brunswick (Sullivan) 🔨	1	3	0	2	0	0	2	0	1	0	1	10

=== Draw 15 ===
Friday, March 12, 1:30 pm

Sheet A	1	2	3	4	5	6	7	8	9	10	Final
British Columbia (Giles) 🔨	1	0	0	0	1	1	0	0	1	2	6
New Brunswick (Sullivan)	0	0	1	0	0	0	2	1	0	0	4

Sheet B	1	2	3	4	5	6	7	8	9	10	Final
Manitoba (Logan)	0	0	0	0	0	2	0	0	1	0	3
Saskatchewan (Heidt) 🔨	0	0	0	0	2	0	0	1	0	2	5

Sheet C	1	2	3	4	5	6	7	8	9	10	11	Final
Alberta (Morken) 🔨	1	1	0	0	1	0	1	0	1	0	1	6
Northern Ontario (Hackner)	0	0	1	1	0	0	0	1	0	2	0	5

Sheet D	1	2	3	4	5	6	7	8	9	10	Final
Newfoundland (Noseworthy)	0	2	0	1	3	0	0	1	0	X	7
Nova Scotia (Goulden) 🔨	1	0	1	0	0	2	1	0	0	X	5

Sheet E	1	2	3	4	5	6	7	8	9	10	Final
Prince Edward Island (Jenkins) 🔨	0	1	1	0	0	1	0	0	1	X	4
Quebec (Aitken)	1	0	0	2	0	0	2	3	0	X	8

== Tiebreakers ==
Manitoba was awarded the bye into the second tiebreaker round based on head-to-head victories over both New Brunswick and Newfoundland in the round robin.

			To Semifinal
			1	Manitoba	4
2	Newfoundland	7		New Brunswick	3
3	New Brunswick	8

=== Round 1 ===
Friday, March 12, 7:30 pm

Sheet D	1	2	3	4	5	6	7	8	9	10	11	Final
Newfoundland (Noseworthy) 🔨	1	0	0	3	0	0	2	1	0	0	0	7
New Brunswick (Sullivan)	0	2	1	0	1	1	0	0	1	1	1	8

=== Round 2 ===
Saturday, March 13, 9:00 am

Sheet B	1	2	3	4	5	6	7	8	9	10	Final
Manitoba (Logan) 🔨	2	0	0	0	0	0	1	1	0	X	4
New Brunswick (Sullivan)	0	0	1	0	0	1	0	0	1	X	3

== Playoffs ==
Semifinal			Final
			1	British Columbia	3
2	Northern Ontario	8	2	Northern Ontario	7
3	Manitoba	5

=== Semifinal ===
Saturday, March 13, 1:45 pm

Sheet C	1	2	3	4	5	6	7	8	9	10	Final
Northern Ontario (Hackner) 🔨	2	0	1	1	1	1	0	2	0	X	8
Manitoba (Logan)	0	1	0	0	0	0	1	0	3	X	5

=== Final ===
Sunday, March 14, 12:45 pm

Sheet C	1	2	3	4	5	6	7	8	9	10	Final
British Columbia (Giles)	0	1	0	1	0	0	0	0	1	X	3
Northern Ontario (Hackner) 🔨	1	0	2	0	1	1	1	1	0	X	7

== Awards ==
=== All-Star Team ===
The media selected the following curlers as All-Stars.

Position	Name	Team
Skip	Al Hackner (2)	Northern Ontario
Third	Doug Armour	Manitoba
Second	Al Roemer	British Columbia
Lead	Warren Rechenmacher	Saskatchewan

=== Ross G.L. Harstone Award ===
The Ross Harstone Award was presented to the player chosen by their fellow peers as the curler who best represented Harstone's high ideals of good sportsmanship, observance of the rules, exemplary conduct and curling ability.

Name	Team	Position
Mark Noseworthy	Newfoundland	Skip
