= Natter =

Natter may refer to:

- Natter (surname)
- Bachem Ba 349, a German manned rocket interceptor from World War II
- Natter (social network), a defunct social network
