= 2006 Canadian Senior Curling Championships =

- Host city: Summerside, Prince Edward Island
- Arena: Silver Fox Curling Club
- Dates: March 25-April 1
- Men's winner: Northern Ontario
- Skip: Al Hackner
- Third: Rick Lang
- Second: Al Laine
- Lead: Brian Adams
- Finalist: Alberta
- Women's winner: Ontario
- Skip: Anne Dunn
- Third: Lindy Marchuk
- Second: Gloria Campbell
- Lead: Carol Thompson
- Finalist: British Columbia

The 2006 Canadian Senior Curling Championships were held March 25-April 1 at the Silver Fox Curling Club in Summerside, Prince Edward Island. The winning teams represented Canada at the 2007 World Senior Curling Championships.

== Men's ==
=== Teams ===
Province / Territory	Skip	Third	Second	Lead
Newfoundland and Labrador	Bas Buckle	Bob Freeman	Gerry Young	Harvey Holloway
Nova Scotia	Don MacIntosh	Peter MacPhee	Mike Currie	Peter Neily
Prince Edward Island	Ted MacFadyen	Mel Bernard	Sandy Foy	Mike Coady
New Brunswick	Mike Flannery	Bryan MacPherson	Chuck Kingston	Marty Mockler
Quebec	Roland Paquin	Kal Murovic	Lawren Steventon	Mac Baines
Ontario	Bruce Delaney	Rick Bachand	Duncan Jamieson	George Mitchell
Northern Ontario	Al Hackner	Rick Lang	Al Laine	Brian Adams
Manitoba	Doug Harrison	Howie Restall (skip)	Doug Holmes	Bill Hodgson
Saskatchewan	Eugene Hritzuk	Larry Ruf	Jim Wilson	Dave Folk
Alberta	Les Rogers	Marv Wirth	Ken McLean	Millard Evans
British Columbia	Bert Gretzinger	Rob Koffski	Brent Giles	Doug Smith
Yukon/Northwest Territories	Paul Hunter	Craig Tuton	John Yeulet	Pat Molloy

=== Standings ===
Locale	Skip	W	L
Alberta	Les Rogers	8	3
Saskatchewan	Eugene Hritzuk	8	3
British Columbia	Bert Gretzinger	8	3
Northern Ontario	Al Hackner	8	3
Manitoba	Doug Harrison	6	5
Nova Scotia	Don MacIntosh	6	5
Prince Edward Island	Ted MacFadyen	6	5
Ontario	Bruce Delaney	5	6
Newfoundland and Labrador	Bas Buckle	4	7
Yukon/Northwest Territories	Paul Hunter	3	8
Quebec	Roland Paquin	3	8
New Brunswick	Mike Flannery	1	10

=== Results ===
==== Draw 1 ====
Sheet B	1	2	3	4	5	6	7	8	9	10	Final
Prince Edward Island (MacFadyen)	1	0	0	0	2	1	0	5	X	X	9
Nova Scotia (MacIntosh)	0	2	0	0	0	0	1	0	X	X	3

Sheet D	1	2	3	4	5	6	7	8	9	10	Final
Ontario (Delaney)	2	0	1	0	0	2	0	2	1	X	8
Quebec (Paquin)	0	1	0	1	1	0	2	0	0	X	5

Sheet F	1	2	3	4	5	6	7	8	9	10	Final
Alberta (Rogers)	0	1	0	3	1	0	1	1	0	X	7
Saskatchewan (Hritzuk)	0	0	0	0	0	2	0	0	0	X	2

==== Draw 2 ====
Sheet B	1	2	3	4	5	6	7	8	9	10	Final
Yukon/Northwest Territories (Hunter)	0	1	1	0	1	1	0	1	1	X	6
Manitoba (Harrison)	0	0	0	1	0	0	2	0	0	X	3

Sheet D	1	2	3	4	5	6	7	8	9	10	Final
British Columbia (Gretzinger)	0	1	0	3	1	0	2	0	3	X	10
Northern Ontario (Hackner)	2	0	1	0	0	3	0	1	0	X	7

Sheet F	1	2	3	4	5	6	7	8	9	10	Final
Newfoundland and Labrador (Buckle)	1	0	0	0	1	0	2	0	0	X	4
New Brunswick (Flannery)	0	2	0	0	0	1	0	2	1	X	6

==== Draw 3 ====
Sheet A	1	2	3	4	5	6	7	8	9	10	Final
Nova Scotia (MacIntosh)	1	0	1	0	3	1	0	0	1	X	7
Saskatchewan (Hritzuk)	0	0	0	1	0	0	2	1	0	X	4

Sheet C	1	2	3	4	5	6	7	8	9	10	Final
Ontario (Delaney)	0	2	0	2	0	0	0	1	0	X	5
Alberta (Rogers)	3	0	2	0	0	0	2	0	1	X	8

Sheet E	1	2	3	4	5	6	7	8	9	10	Final
Quebec (Paquin)	0	0	1	0	0	1	0	1	0	0	3
Prince Edward Island (MacFadyen)	0	1	0	0	1	0	1	0	0	1	4

==== Draw 4 ====
Sheet A	1	2	3	4	5	6	7	8	9	10	11	Final
Northern Ontario (Hackner)	3	0	0	1	0	1	0	1	0	0	1	7
New Brunswick (Flannery)	0	0	1	0	1	0	1	0	2	1	0	6

Sheet C	1	2	3	4	5	6	7	8	9	10	Final
Yukon/Northwest Territories (Hunter)	1	0	1	0	0	0	0	2	0	X	4
Newfoundland and Labrador (Buckle)	0	1	0	2	0	1	3	0	1	X	8

Sheet E	1	2	3	4	5	6	7	8	9	10	Final
Manitoba (Harrison)	0	0	1	0	2	0	1	0	0	1	5
British Columbia (Gretzinger)	0	0	0	1	0	1	0	1	1	0	4

==== Draw 5 ====
Sheet B	1	2	3	4	5	6	7	8	9	10	11	Final
New Brunswick (Flannery)	0	2	0	0	3	0	1	0	1	0	0	7
Yukon/Northwest Territories (Hunter)	1	0	1	1	0	2	0	1	0	1	1	8

Sheet D	1	2	3	4	5	6	7	8	9	10	Final
Newfoundland and Labrador (Buckle)	0	1	0	1	0	0	1	0	X	X	3
British Columbia (Gretzinger)	0	0	0	0	0	4	0	5	X	X	9

Sheet F	1	2	3	4	5	6	7	8	9	10	Final
Northern Ontario (Hackner)	0	1	1	0	3	0	5	X	X	X	10
Manitoba (Harrison)	0	0	0	1	0	1	0	X	X	X	2

==== Draw 6 ====
Sheet B	1	2	3	4	5	6	7	8	9	10	Final
Saskatchewan (Hritzuk)	0	0	3	1	0	4	X	X	X	X	8
Ontario (Delaney)	0	0	0	0	1	0	X	X	X	X	1

Sheet D	1	2	3	4	5	6	7	8	9	10	Final
Nova Scotia (MacIntosh)	1	0	0	1	0	0	1	X	X	X	3
Quebec (Paquin)	0	2	1	0	4	2	0	X	X	X	9

Sheet F	1	2	3	4	5	6	7	8	9	10	Final
Alberta (Rogers)	1	0	1	1	0	1	0	0	2	0	6
Prince Edward Island (MacFadyen)	0	1	0	0	2	0	0	1	0	3	7

==== Draw 7 ====
Sheet A	1	2	3	4	5	6	7	8	9	10	11	12	Final
Manitoba (Harrison)	0	0	1	0	1	0	0	2	1	2	0	1	8
Newfoundland and Labrador (Buckle)	1	2	0	2	0	1	1	0	0	0	0	0	7

Sheet C	1	2	3	4	5	6	7	8	9	10	Final
British Columbia (Gretzinger)	0	1	0	0	5	3	0	3	0	0	12
New Brunswick (Flannery)	3	0	4	1	0	0	1	0	1	0	10

Sheet E	1	2	3	4	5	6	7	8	9	10	Final
Yukon/Northwest Territories (Hunter)	0	1	1	0	0	0	1	0	0	X	3
Northern Ontario (Hackner)	0	0	0	1	1	1	0	3	1	X	7

==== Draw 8 ====
Sheet A	1	2	3	4	5	6	7	8	9	10	Final
Quebec (Paquin)	0	1	0	0	1	1	1	0	0	X	4
Alberta (Rogers)	0	0	0	3	0	0	0	2	1	X	6

Sheet C	1	2	3	4	5	6	7	8	9	10	Final
Ontario (Delaney)	1	0	1	0	1	0	0	3	0	2	8
Nova Scotia (MacIntosh)	0	1	0	1	0	1	3	0	1	0	7

Sheet E	1	2	3	4	5	6	7	8	9	10	Final
Prince Edward Island (MacFadyen)	1	0	1	0	3	0	0	0	1	0	6
Saskatchewan (Hritzuk)	0	1	0	2	0	2	1	1	0	1	8

==== Draw 9 ====
Sheet A	1	2	3	4	5	6	7	8	9	10	Final
Prince Edward Island (MacFadyen)	0	0	0	0	0	0	1	X	X	X	1
Ontario (Delaney)	0	1	1	3	1	2	0	X	X	X	8

Sheet C	1	2	3	4	5	6	7	8	9	10	Final
Saskatchewan (Hritzuk)	0	1	0	0	2	0	0	2	0	1	6
Quebec (Paquin)	0	0	1	0	0	1	0	0	2	0	4

Sheet E	1	2	3	4	5	6	7	8	9	10	Final
Alberta (Rogers)	2	0	0	1	0	0	0	0	X	X	3
Nova Scotia (MacIntosh)	0	1	1	0	2	1	2	1	X	X	8

==== Draw 10 ====
Sheet B	1	2	3	4	5	6	7	8	9	10	Final
British Columbia (Gretzinger)	0	2	2	1	0	2	2	X	X	X	9
Yukon/Northwest Territories (Hunter)	1	0	0	0	1	0	0	X	X	X	2

Sheet C	1	2	3	4	5	6	7	8	9	10	Final
New Brunswick (Flannery)	0	0	0	0	0	0	0	0	0	0	0
Manitoba (Harrison)	0	0	1	0	0	0	0	0	0	2	3

Sheet E	1	2	3	4	5	6	7	8	9	10	Final
Newfoundland and Labrador (Buckle)	0	1	0	1	0	0	2	0	1	5	10
Northern Ontario (Hackner)	0	0	2	0	1	0	0	1	0	0	4

==== Draw 11 ====
Sheet A	1	2	3	4	5	6	7	8	9	10	Final
Prince Edward Island (MacFadyen)	3	0	2	0	3	0	X	X	X	X	8
Yukon/Northwest Territories (Hunter)	0	1	0	1	0	1	X	X	X	X	3

Sheet B	1	2	3	4	5	6	7	8	9	10	Final
Nova Scotia (MacIntosh)	3	0	1	1	0	3	0	0	0	X	8
Newfoundland and Labrador (Buckle)	0	1	0	0	1	0	2	1	1	X	6

Sheet C	1	2	3	4	5	6	7	8	9	10	11	Final
Quebec (Paquin)	0	0	2	0	1	0	0	1	0	1	0	5
Northern Ontario (Hackner)	1	0	0	1	0	1	0	0	2	0	1	6

Sheet D	1	2	3	4	5	6	7	8	9	10	Final
Alberta (Rogers)	0	1	0	0	0	1	1	3	0	X	6
New Brunswick (Flannery)	0	0	1	0	0	0	0	0	2	X	3

Sheet E	1	2	3	4	5	6	7	8	9	10	11	Final
Ontario (Delaney)	1	0	0	1	0	0	0	2	1	0	0	5
Manitoba (Harrison)	0	0	0	0	2	1	1	0	0	1	1	6

Sheet F	1	2	3	4	5	6	7	8	9	10	Final
Saskatchewan (Hritzuk)	0	0	0	0	2	0	0	2	0	1	5
British Columbia (Gretzinger)	0	0	0	0	0	0	2	0	2	0	4

==== Draw 13 ====
Sheet A	1	2	3	4	5	6	7	8	9	10	Final
Newfoundland and Labrador (Buckle)	0	0	0	1	0	1	1	1	0	1	5
Alberta (Rogers)	0	0	1	0	0	0	0	0	1	0	2

Sheet B	1	2	3	4	5	6	7	8	9	10	Final
Yukon/Northwest Territories (Hunter)	1	0	2	0	1	0	0	0	0	X	4
Ontario (Delaney)	0	2	0	2	0	3	1	0	2	X	10

Sheet C	1	2	3	4	5	6	7	8	9	10	Final
British Columbia (Gretzinger)	1	0	0	2	0	0	0	1	0	2	6
Prince Edward Island (MacFadyen)	0	1	1	0	0	0	1	0	2	0	5

Sheet D	1	2	3	4	5	6	7	8	9	10	Final
Northern Ontario (Hackner)	1	0	0	1	1	2	0	2	0	0	7
Nova Scotia (MacIntosh)	0	1	0	0	0	0	2	0	1	1	5

Sheet E	1	2	3	4	5	6	7	8	9	10	Final
New Brunswick (Flannery)	1	0	1	0	2	0	1	0	1	0	6
Saskatchewan (Hritzuk)	0	1	0	2	0	1	0	2	0	1	7

Sheet F	1	2	3	4	5	6	7	8	9	10	Final
Manitoba (Harrison)	0	0	0	0	1	0	1	0	2	3	7
Quebec (Paquin)	0	0	0	2	0	3	0	1	0	0	6

==== Draw 15 ====
Sheet A	1	2	3	4	5	6	7	8	9	10	Final
Manitoba (Harrison)	0	1	0	0	0	0	1	0	2	0	4
Saskatchewan (Hritzuk)	0	0	0	0	0	2	0	2	0	1	5

Sheet B	1	2	3	4	5	6	7	8	9	10	Final
New Brunswick (Flannery)	0	0	1	1	1	1	0	0	0	1	5
Quebec (Paquin)	0	0	0	0	0	0	2	1	3	0	6

Sheet C	1	2	3	4	5	6	7	8	9	10	Final
Yukon/Northwest Territories (Hunter)	1	0	0	1	0	0	1	0	X	X	3
Alberta (Rogers)	0	2	1	0	4	1	0	1	X	X	9

Sheet D	1	2	3	4	5	6	7	8	9	10	Final
Northern Ontario (Hackner)	2	0	1	0	1	0	0	1	0	2	7
Prince Edward Island (MacFadyen)	0	1	0	1	0	0	1	0	3	0	6

Sheet E	1	2	3	4	5	6	7	8	9	10	Final
British Columbia (Gretzinger)	0	1	2	1	0	2	0	1	X	X	7
Nova Scotia (MacIntosh)	0	0	0	0	1	0	1	0	X	X	2

Sheet F	1	2	3	4	5	6	7	8	9	10	Final
Newfoundland and Labrador (Buckle)	2	0	0	0	3	0	3	0	1	X	9
Ontario (Delaney)	0	1	1	0	0	2	0	1	0	X	5

==== Draw 17 ====
Sheet A	1	2	3	4	5	6	7	8	9	10	Final
Quebec (Paquin)	0	2	0	2	1	0	0	2	0	0	7
British Columbia (Gretzinger)	1	0	2	0	0	2	2	0	0	1	8

Sheet B	1	2	3	4	5	6	7	8	9	10	Final
Prince Edward Island (MacFadyen)	1	1	0	2	0	2	0	2	X	X	8
Newfoundland and Labrador (Buckle)	0	0	1	0	1	0	1	0	X	X	3

Sheet C	1	2	3	4	5	6	7	8	9	10	11	Final
Saskatchewan (Hritzuk)	0	1	0	0	2	0	0	1	0	0	0	4
Northern Ontario (Hackner)	0	0	1	1	0	0	1	0	0	1	1	5

Sheet D	1	2	3	4	5	6	7	8	9	10	Final
Alberta (Rogers)	0	0	0	0	2	0	5	2	X	X	9
Manitoba (Harrison)	0	0	1	0	0	1	0	0	X	X	2

Sheet E	1	2	3	4	5	6	7	8	9	10	Final
Ontario (Delaney)	1	0	0	0	2	0	1	0	1	2	7
New Brunswick (Flannery)	0	0	1	1	0	2	0	0	0	0	4

Sheet F	1	2	3	4	5	6	7	8	9	10	Final
Nova Scotia (MacIntosh)	1	0	1	0	2	0	1	0	0	1	6
Yukon/Northwest Territories (Hunter)	0	0	0	1	0	1	0	1	1	0	4

==== Draw 19 ====
Sheet A	1	2	3	4	5	6	7	8	9	10	Final
Ontario (Delaney)	1	3	0	0	0	0	X	X	X	X	4
Northern Ontario (Hackner)	0	0	2	2	4	1	X	X	X	X	9

Sheet B	1	2	3	4	5	6	7	8	9	10	Final
Alberta (Rogers)	2	0	0	2	0	1	0	0	0	2	7
British Columbia (Gretzinger)	0	1	1	0	1	0	2	1	0	0	6

Sheet C	1	2	3	4	5	6	7	8	9	10	Final
Nova Scotia (MacIntosh)	4	1	3	1	0	0	X	X	X	X	9
Manitoba (Harrison)	0	0	0	0	0	1	X	X	X	X	1

Sheet D	1	2	3	4	5	6	7	8	9	10	Final
Saskatchewan (Hritzuk)	2	0	0	0	3	2	0	4	X	X	11
Yukon/Northwest Territories (Hunter)	0	0	2	1	0	0	1	0	X	X	4

Sheet E	1	2	3	4	5	6	7	8	9	10	Final
Quebec (Paquin)	0	1	0	1	0	0	1	0	4	X	7
Newfoundland and Labrador (Buckle)	0	0	1	0	0	1	0	1	0	X	3

Sheet F	1	2	3	4	5	6	7	8	9	10	Final
Prince Edward Island (MacFadyen)	4	0	0	1	1	1	5	X	X	X	12
New Brunswick (Flannery)	0	2	3	0	0	0	0	X	X	X	5

==== Draw 21 ====
Sheet A	1	2	3	4	5	6	7	8	9	10	Final
New Brunswick (Flannery)	0	1	0	0	1	0	X	X	X	X	2
Nova Scotia (MacIntosh)	0	0	3	2	0	6	X	X	X	X	11

Sheet B	1	2	3	4	5	6	7	8	9	10	Final
Northern Ontario (Hackner)	0	1	0	0	0	1	0	0	2	0	4
Alberta (Rogers)	0	0	0	0	1	0	0	3	0	1	5

Sheet C	1	2	3	4	5	6	7	8	9	10	11	Final
Manitoba (Harrison)	0	1	0	1	1	0	0	0	1	0	1	5
Prince Edward Island (MacFadyen)	0	0	1	0	0	1	1	0	0	1	0	4

Sheet D	1	2	3	4	5	6	7	8	9	10	Final
Newfoundland and Labrador (Buckle)	1	0	0	1	0	2	0	1	0	X	5
Saskatchewan (Hritzuk)	0	1	1	0	3	0	3	0	1	X	9

Sheet E	1	2	3	4	5	6	7	8	9	10	11	Final
Yukon/Northwest Territories (Hunter)	1	0	1	0	2	0	2	3	0	0	1	10
Quebec (Paquin)	0	2	0	2	0	3	0	0	1	1	0	9

Sheet F	1	2	3	4	5	6	7	8	9	10	11	Final
British Columbia (Gretzinger)	2	0	1	0	1	0	2	0	0	0	1	7
Ontario (Delaney)	0	1	0	1	0	1	0	1	1	1	0	6

=== Playoffs ===
Tiebreaker		Semifinal		Final
British Columbia	4
Saskatchewan	6	Northern Ontario	6
		Saskatchewan	5
				Alberta	4
				Northern Ontario	7

==== Tiebreaker ====
Sheet C	1	2	3	4	5	6	7	8	9	10	Final
British Columbia (Gretzinger)	0	0	0	0	1	0	3	0	0	X	4
Saskatchewan (Hritzuk)	1	0	0	1	0	1	0	2	1	X	6

Player percentages
British Columbia		Saskatchewan	
Doug Smith	91%	Dave Folk	84%
Brent Giles	85%	Jim Wilson	83%
Rob Koffski	75%	Larry Ruf	89%
Bert Gretzinger	71%	Eugene Hritzuk	84%
Total	81%	Total	85%

==== Semifinal ====
Sheet B	1	2	3	4	5	6	7	8	9	10	11	Final
Northern Ontario (Hackner)	1	0	1	0	0	0	1	0	2	0	1	6
Saskatchewan (Hritzuk)	0	1	0	0	0	1	0	2	0	1	0	5

Player percentages
Northern Ontario		Saskatchewan	
Brian Adams	89%	Dave Folk	88%
Al Laine	81%	Jim Wilson	78%
Rick Lang	80%	Larry Ruf	88%
Al Hackner	90%	Eugene Hritzuk	81%
Total	85%	Total	84%

==== Final ====
Sheet D	1	2	3	4	5	6	7	8	9	10	Final
Northern Ontario (Hackner)	0	0	2	1	0	2	1	0	1	X	7
Alberta (Rogers)	1	0	0	0	2	0	0	1	0	X	4

Player percentages
Northern Ontario		Alberta	
Brian Adams	72%	Millard Evans	84%
Al Laine	78%	Ken McLean	83%
Rick Lang	93%	Marv Wirth	70%
Al Hackner	84%	Les Rogers	82%
Total	82%	Total	79%

== Women's ==
=== Teams ===
Province / Territory	Skip	Third	Second	Lead
Newfoundland and Labrador	Diane Graff	Debra Baggs	Mary Bryne	Cheryl Stagg
Nova Scotia	Marg Cutcliffe	Penny LaRocque (skip)	Jane Arseneau	Jill Linquist
Prince Edward Island	Barb Currie	Karen MacDonald	Helen MacDonald	Dawn MacFadyen
New Brunswick	Karen McDermott	Debbi Dickeson	Judy Dougan	Shawn Stubbert
Quebec	Agnes Charette	Diane Harris	Lois Baines	Mary Anne Robertson
Ontario	Anne Dunn	Lindy Marchuk	Gloria Campbell	Carol Thompson
Northern Ontario	Pat Dayes	Doreen McLuhan	Diane Sauve	Paulette Brown
Manitoba	Joyce McDougall	Helen Fenwick	Pam Horn	Karen Dunbar
Saskatchewan	Crystal Frisk	Diane Baumung	Roberta Fonger	Wendy Leach
Alberta	Shirley McPherson	Diane Foster	Shirley Kohuch	Chris Wilson
British Columbia	Jane Adam	Janet Klebe	Debbie Cranfield	Wendy Whitlam
Northwest Territories/Yukon	Sandy Penkala	Margaret Begg	Gail Daniels	Marie Coe

=== Standings ===
Locale	Skip	W	L
Ontario	Anne Dunn	10	1
British Columbia	Jane Adam	9	2
Nova Scotia	Penny LaRocque	8	3
Quebec	Agnes Charette	6	5
Manitoba	Joyce McDougall	6	5
Alberta	Shirley McPherson	5	6
Northern Ontario	Pat Dayes	5	6
New Brunswick	Karen McDermott	4	7
Prince Edward Island	Barb Currie	4	7
Northwest Territories/Yukon	Sandy Penkala	4	7
Saskatchewan	Crystal Frisk	3	8
Newfoundland and Labrador	Diane Graff	2	9

=== Results ===
==== Draw 1 ====
Sheet A	1	2	3	4	5	6	7	8	9	10	Final
Northern Ontario (Dayes)	0	2	0	1	0	2	1	1	2	X	9
Saskatchewan (Frisk)	2	0	1	0	1	0	0	0	0	X	4

Sheet C	1	2	3	4	5	6	7	8	9	10	Final
Northwest Territories/Yukon (Penkala)	0	0	2	0	1	0	0	0	X	X	3
Manitoba (McDougall)	1	3	0	1	0	1	2	2	X	X	10

Sheet E	1	2	3	4	5	6	7	8	9	10	Final
Quebec (Charette)	3	1	0	1	0	1	0	0	0	1	7
Nova Scotia (LaRocque)	0	0	3	0	1	0	2	0	0	0	6

==== Draw 2 ====
Sheet A	1	2	3	4	5	6	7	8	9	10	Final
New Brunswick (McDermott)	0	1	1	0	0	1	0	1	0	1	5
British Columbia (Adam)	2	0	0	1	2	0	1	0	1	0	7

Sheet C	1	2	3	4	5	6	7	8	9	10	Final
Newfoundland and Labrador (Graff)	2	0	1	0	0	0	2	0	0	0	5
Alberta (McPherson)	0	1	0	3	1	0	0	1	0	4	10

Sheet E	1	2	3	4	5	6	7	8	9	10	Final
Prince Edward Island (Currie)	0	1	0	1	0	0	1	0	X	X	3
Ontario (Dunn)	1	0	3	0	1	2	0	2	X	X	9

==== Draw 3 ====
Sheet B	1	2	3	4	5	6	7	8	9	10	Final
Northwest Territories/Yukon (Penkala)	1	0	0	0	3	0	1	0	X	X	5
Quebec (Charette)	0	2	1	2	0	2	0	4	X	X	11

Sheet D	1	2	3	4	5	6	7	8	9	10	Final
Manitoba (McDougall)	3	0	0	2	0	1	0	1	0	X	7
Northern Ontario (Dayes)	0	1	1	0	1	0	2	0	0	X	5

Sheet F	1	2	3	4	5	6	7	8	9	10	Final
Saskatchewan (Frisk)	2	0	0	2	0	1	0	1	0	X	6
Nova Scotia (LaRocque)	0	1	1	0	3	0	2	0	1	X	8

==== Draw 4 ====
Sheet B	1	2	3	4	5	6	7	8	9	10	Final
Newfoundland and Labrador (Graff)	0	1	0	0	3	0	X	X	X	X	4
Ontario (Dunn)	1	0	3	6	0	3	X	X	X	X	13

Sheet D	1	2	3	4	5	6	7	8	9	10	Final
New Brunswick (McDermott)	1	0	2	0	1	0	0	2	0	2	8
Alberta (McPherson)	0	1	0	1	0	0	1	0	1	0	4

Sheet F	1	2	3	4	5	6	7	8	9	10	Final
British Columbia (Adam)	0	0	0	1	0	0	1	0	0	4	6
Prince Edward Island (Currie)	0	0	1	0	1	0	0	0	1	0	3

==== Draw 5 ====
Sheet A	1	2	3	4	5	6	7	8	9	10	Final
Ontario (Dunn)	1	3	0	0	2	0	1	0	1	X	8
New Brunswick (McDermott)	0	0	2	0	0	1	0	1	0	X	4

Sheet C	1	2	3	4	5	6	7	8	9	10	Final
Prince Edward Island (Currie)	0	0	1	1	0	3	0	2	0	1	8
Newfoundland and Labrador (Graff)	1	1	0	0	2	0	2	0	1	0	7

Sheet E	1	2	3	4	5	6	7	8	9	10	Final
Alberta (McPherson)	0	2	1	0	2	0	1	0	2	X	8
British Columbia (Adam)	1	0	0	4	0	3	0	3	0	X	11

==== Draw 6 ====
Sheet A	1	2	3	4	5	6	7	8	9	10	11	Final
Nova Scotia (LaRocque)	0	1	0	1	0	0	0	3	0	0	1	6
Manitoba (McDougall)	0	0	1	0	0	0	1	0	2	1	0	5

Sheet C	1	2	3	4	5	6	7	8	9	10	11	Final
Quebec (Charette)	1	0	0	0	3	1	0	0	1	0	1	7
Saskatchewan (Frisk)	0	1	0	1	0	0	1	1	0	2	0	6

Sheet E	1	2	3	4	5	6	7	8	9	10	Final
Northern Ontario (Dayes)	1	0	0	1	2	1	0	1	0	X	6
Northwest Territories/Yukon (Penkala)	0	1	1	0	0	0	0	0	1	X	3

==== Draw 7 ====
Sheet B	1	2	3	4	5	6	7	8	9	10	Final
New Brunswick (McDermott)	2	0	1	1	0	2	2	X	X	X	8
Prince Edward Island (Currie)	0	1	0	0	1	0	0	X	X	X	2

Sheet D	1	2	3	4	5	6	7	8	9	10	Final
British Columbia (Adam)	0	1	0	1	1	0	3	0	2	2	10
Newfoundland and Labrador (Graff)	0	0	1	0	0	1	0	2	0	0	4

Sheet F	1	2	3	4	5	6	7	8	9	10	Final
Alberta (McPherson)	1	0	0	0	0	2	0	3	0	0	6
Ontario (Dunn)	0	0	1	1	2	0	1	0	2	1	8

==== Draw 8 ====
Sheet B	1	2	3	4	5	6	7	8	9	10	Final
Northwest Territories/Yukon (Penkala)	1	0	4	3	0	1	0	0	0	X	9
Saskatchewan (Frisk)	0	1	0	0	1	0	2	1	2	X	7

Sheet D	1	2	3	4	5	6	7	8	9	10	Final
Northern Ontario (Dayes)	0	0	1	0	1	0	0	1	1	2	6
Nova Scotia (LaRocque)	0	0	0	2	0	2	1	0	0	0	5

Sheet F	1	2	3	4	5	6	7	8	9	10	Final
Manitoba (McDougall)	1	0	0	1	1	1	0	0	1	0	5
Quebec (Charette)	0	1	2	0	0	0	0	3	0	1	7

==== Draw 9 ====
Sheet B	1	2	3	4	5	6	7	8	9	10	Final
Nova Scotia (LaRocque)	0	2	0	0	1	0	1	0	4	0	8
Northwest Territories/Yukon (Penkala)	0	0	0	1	0	4	0	2	0	2	9

Sheet D	1	2	3	4	5	6	7	8	9	10	Final
Saskatchewan (Frisk)	0	1	0	0	0	0	0	X	X	X	1
Manitoba (McDougall)	0	0	1	3	1	3	1	X	X	X	9

Sheet F	1	2	3	4	5	6	7	8	9	10	Final
Quebec (Charette)	2	0	0	1	0	0	0	1	0	X	4
Northern Ontario (Dayes)	0	2	3	0	1	1	1	0	1	X	9

==== Draw 10 ====
Sheet A	1	2	3	4	5	6	7	8	9	10	Final
Ontario (Dunn)	3	0	1	1	0	3	1	X	X	X	9
British Columbia (Adam)	0	1	0	0	2	0	0	X	X	X	3

Sheet D	1	2	3	4	5	6	7	8	9	10	Final
Prince Edward Island (Currie)	2	0	0	2	0	3	0	0	0	X	7
Alberta (McPherson)	0	1	2	0	4	0	2	1	2	X	12

Sheet F	1	2	3	4	5	6	7	8	9	10	Final
Newfoundland and Labrador (Graff)	2	0	1	0	0	1	0	0	0	X	4
New Brunswick (McDermott)	0	1	0	2	0	0	0	3	4	X	10

==== Draw 12 ====
Sheet A	1	2	3	4	5	6	7	8	9	10	Final
Saskatchewan (Frisk)	0	1	0	4	1	0	3	2	X	X	11
Prince Edward Island (Currie)	0	0	3	0	0	3	0	0	X	X	6

Sheet B	1	2	3	4	5	6	7	8	9	10	Final
Manitoba (McDougall)	0	0	1	0	0	2	0	2	0	0	5
Alberta (McPherson)	1	0	0	1	1	0	2	0	0	1	6

Sheet C	1	2	3	4	5	6	7	8	9	10	Final
Quebec (Charette)	1	0	0	1	1	1	1	0	0	X	5
Ontario (Dunn)	0	2	3	0	0	0	0	2	1	X	8

Sheet D	1	2	3	4	5	6	7	8	9	10	Final
Northwest Territories/Yukon (Penkala)	1	0	2	0	0	1	0	1	0	0	5
British Columbia (Adam)	0	2	0	1	1	0	1	0	2	1	8

Sheet E	1	2	3	4	5	6	7	8	9	10	Final
Nova Scotia (LaRocque)	0	0	2	4	0	1	0	0	2	X	9
Newfoundland and Labrador (Graff)	2	0	0	0	1	0	1	1	0	X	5

Sheet F	1	2	3	4	5	6	7	8	9	10	Final
Northern Ontario (Dayes)	1	0	0	1	1	0	0	1	0	X	4
New Brunswick (McDermott)	0	2	2	0	0	2	0	0	1	X	7

==== Draw 14 ====
Sheet A	1	2	3	4	5	6	7	8	9	10	Final
New Brunswick (McDermott)	0	0	0	2	2	0	2	0	0	X	6
Northwest Territories/Yukon (Penkala)	1	1	1	0	0	3	0	2	2	X	10

Sheet B	1	2	3	4	5	6	7	8	9	10	Final
Newfoundland and Labrador (Graff)	1	1	0	1	0	1	1	0	X	X	5
Northern Ontario (Dayes)	0	0	2	0	4	0	0	4	X	X	10

Sheet C	1	2	3	4	5	6	7	8	9	10	Final
Alberta (McPherson)	0	4	0	1	0	0	1	0	2	X	8
Saskatchewan (Frisk)	1	0	2	0	3	1	0	2	0	X	9

Sheet D	1	2	3	4	5	6	7	8	9	10	Final
Ontario (Dunn)	1	1	0	0	0	2	0	0	0	X	4
Nova Scotia (LaRocque)	0	0	1	1	1	0	1	2	1	X	7

Sheet E	1	2	3	4	5	6	7	8	9	10	Final
British Columbia (Adam)	2	1	1	2	0	0	3	0	1	X	10
Manitoba (McDougall)	0	0	0	0	1	2	0	2	0	X	6

Sheet F	1	2	3	4	5	6	7	8	9	10	Final
Prince Edward Island (Currie)	1	0	1	2	0	2	0	0	1	1	8
Quebec (Charette)	0	1	0	0	3	0	1	2	0	0	7

==== Draw 16 ====
Sheet A	1	2	3	4	5	6	7	8	9	10	Final
Northern Ontario (Dayes)	1	0	1	1	0	0	1	0	2	0	6
Prince Edward Island (Currie)	0	3	0	0	1	1	0	1	0	1	7

Sheet B	1	2	3	4	5	6	7	8	9	10	Final
Nova Scotia (LaRocque)	1	0	1	0	4	2	0	0	0	X	8
Alberta (McPherson)	0	1	0	1	0	0	1	1	1	X	5

Sheet C	1	2	3	4	5	6	7	8	9	10	Final
Quebec (Charette)	1	0	1	0	1	0	0	1	0	X	4
British Columbia (Adam)	0	3	0	2	0	1	1	0	2	X	9

Sheet D	1	2	3	4	5	6	7	8	9	10	Final
Northwest Territories/Yukon (Penkala)	1	0	1	0	0	1	0	0	1	0	4
Ontario (Dunn)	0	1	0	1	1	0	1	1	0	1	6

Sheet E	1	2	3	4	5	6	7	8	9	10	11	Final
Saskatchewan (Frisk)	1	0	2	0	3	0	1	0	1	0	2	10
New Brunswick (McDermott)	0	2	0	1	0	2	0	1	0	2	0	8

Sheet F	1	2	3	4	5	6	7	8	9	10	Final
Manitoba (McDougall)	1	0	2	0	2	0	0	1	1	X	7
Newfoundland and Labrador (Graff)	0	1	0	1	0	1	1	0	0	X	4

==== Draw 18 ====
Sheet A	1	2	3	4	5	6	7	8	9	10	Final
Quebec (Charette)	3	0	0	0	2	0	1	0	2	0	8
Newfoundland and Labrador (Graff)	0	0	1	1	0	2	0	3	0	2	9

Sheet B	1	2	3	4	5	6	7	8	9	10	Final
Saskatchewan (Frisk)	0	1	0	1	0	0	0	X	X	X	2
British Columbia (Adam)	1	0	2	0	4	1	2	X	X	X	10

Sheet C	1	2	3	4	5	6	7	8	9	10	Final
Nova Scotia (LaRocque)	2	0	1	1	3	0	0	3	X	X	10
New Brunswick (McDermott)	0	1	0	0	0	1	1	0	X	X	3

Sheet D	1	2	3	4	5	6	7	8	9	10	Final
Manitoba (McDougall)	1	0	0	1	2	0	3	3	X	X	10
Prince Edward Island (Currie)	0	1	1	0	0	1	0	0	X	X	3

Sheet E	1	2	3	4	5	6	7	8	9	10	Final
Northern Ontario (Dayes)	0	2	0	1	0	1	0	1	0	X	5
Ontario (Dunn)	0	0	1	0	1	0	3	0	4	X	9

Sheet F	1	2	3	4	5	6	7	8	9	10	Final
Northwest Territories/Yukon (Penkala)	5	0	1	0	0	0	2	0	1	0	9
Alberta (McPherson)	0	1	0	3	1	1	0	3	0	1	10

==== Draw 20 ====
Sheet A	1	2	3	4	5	6	7	8	9	10	Final
Ontario (Dunn)	3	2	0	1	1	1	0	1	X	X	9
Manitoba (McDougall)	0	0	1	0	0	0	2	0	X	X	3

Sheet B	1	2	3	4	5	6	7	8	9	10	Final
New Brunswick (McDermott)	0	0	0	1	0	2	0	1	0	X	4
Quebec (Charette)	1	1	1	0	2	0	1	0	1	X	7

Sheet C	1	2	3	4	5	6	7	8	9	10	Final
Alberta (McPherson)	0	1	0	3	2	0	1	0	3	X	10
Northern Ontario (Dayes)	1	0	1	0	0	1	0	2	0	X	5

Sheet D	1	2	3	4	5	6	7	8	9	10	Final
Newfoundland and Labrador (Graff)	2	0	2	0	0	0	1	3	0	1	9
Saskatchewan (Frisk)	0	1	0	1	3	1	0	0	2	0	8

Sheet E	1	2	3	4	5	6	7	8	9	10	Final
Prince Edward Island (Currie)	2	1	0	1	2	0	2	0	1	X	9
Northwest Territories/Yukon (Penkala)	0	0	1	0	0	1	0	2	0	X	4

Sheet F	1	2	3	4	5	6	7	8	9	10	Final
British Columbia (Adam)	1	0	0	0	1	0	0	2	1	0	5
Nova Scotia (LaRocque)	0	0	1	2	0	2	2	0	0	1	8

==== Draw 22 ====
Sheet A	1	2	3	4	5	6	7	8	9	10	11	Final
Alberta (McPherson)	1	0	2	0	1	0	1	0	0	1	0	6
Quebec (Charette)	0	2	0	1	0	1	0	1	1	0	2	8

Sheet B	1	2	3	4	5	6	7	8	9	10	Final
British Columbia (Adam)	2	1	0	1	0	1	0	0	5	X	10
Northern Ontario (Dayes)	0	0	1	0	1	0	2	1	0	X	5

Sheet C	1	2	3	4	5	6	7	8	9	10	Final
Prince Edward Island (Currie)	1	0	0	0	0	1	0	0	1	X	3
Nova Scotia (LaRocque)	0	1	1	1	1	0	1	1	0	X	6

Sheet D	1	2	3	4	5	6	7	8	9	10	11	Final
New Brunswick (McDermott)	3	0	1	0	0	3	0	0	0	1	0	8
Manitoba (McDougall)	0	1	0	1	3	0	0	2	1	0	1	9

Sheet E	1	2	3	4	5	6	7	8	9	10	Final
Newfoundland and Labrador (Graff)	1	0	2	0	1	0	0	3	0	0	7
Northwest Territories/Yukon (Penkala)	0	1	0	3	0	2	0	0	1	1	8

Sheet F	1	2	3	4	5	6	7	8	9	10	Final
Ontario (Dunn)	1	0	2	0	2	0	1	1	1	X	8
Saskatchewan (Frisk)	0	1	0	1	0	2	0	0	0	X	4

=== Playoffs ===
Semifinal		Final
British Columbia	7
Nova Scotia	5	Ontario	13
		British Columbia	2

==== Semifinal ====
Sheet D	1	2	3	4	5	6	7	8	9	10	Final
British Columbia (Adam)	0	0	2	1	0	2	0	1	0	1	7
Nova Scotia (LaRocque)	0	1	0	0	2	0	1	0	1	0	5

Player percentages
British Columbia		Nova Scotia	
Wendy Whitlam	89%	Jill Linquist	78%
Debbie Cranfield	74%	Jane Arseneau	84%
Janet Klebe	78%	Penny LaRocque	69%
Jane Adam	68%	Marg Cutcliffe	73%
Total	77%	Total	76%

==== Final ====
Sheet B	1	2	3	4	5	6	7	8	9	10	Final
Ontario (Dunn)	1	0	5	1	1	5	X	X	X	X	13
British Columbia (Adam)	0	2	0	0	0	0	X	X	X	X	2

Player percentages
Ontario		British Columbia	
Carol Thompson	71%	Wendy Whitlam	52%
Gloria Campbell	75%	Debbie Cranfield	58%
Lindy Marchuk	81%	Janet Klebe	60%
Anne Dunn	85%	Jane Adam	35%
Total	78%	Total	52%
