= Kamloops Crown of Curling =

Canadian curling tournament

- Established: 1974
- Host city: Kamloops, British Columbia
- Arena: Kamloops Curling Club
- Men's purse: $9,000
- Women's purse: $9,000

Current champions (2025)
- Men: (British Columbia) Richard Krell
- Women: (Japan) Miyu Ueno

Location in Canada

The Kamloops Crown of Curling (formerly the Hub International Crown of Curling, Valley First Crown of Curling, Strauss Crown of Curling, Labatt's Crown of Curling, Labatt Crown of Curling, Thompson Crown of Curling, Thompson Hotel Crown of Curling, and Barton Insurance Crown of Curling) is an annual bonspiel, or curling tournament, held in October at the Kamloops Curling Club in Kamloops. The purse for the event is CAD $15,000 for the men's event and $11,000 for the women's event.

The event has been held since 1974.

== Past champions ==
=== Men ===
Year	Winning skip	Runner-up skip	Purse (CAD)
1974	(British Columbia) Brent Giles	(Alberta) Tom Kroeger	$10,500
1975	(British Columbia) Bernie Sparkes	(Alberta) Tom Kroeger	
1976	(Saskatchewan) Bob Pickering	(British Columbia) Bernie Sparkes	$15,500
1977	(British Columbia) Roy Vinthers	(British Columbia) Glen Hillson	$18,500
1978	(British Columbia) Tony Eberts	(British Columbia) Steve Skillings	$25,000
1979	(British Columbia) Jack Hockey	(British Columbia) Brent Giles	
1980	(Manitoba) Kerry Burtnyk	(Alberta) Ed Lukowich	$30,000
1981	(Alberta) Frank Bailey	(British Columbia) Bert Gretzinger	$35,000
1982	(Alberta) Wayne Sokolosky	(British Columbia) Dave Simpson	$35,000
1983	(British Columbia) Paul Gowsell	(British Columbia) Bert Gretzinger	$35,000
1984	(Alberta) Dennis Graber	(British Columbia) Gary Sigurdson	
1986	(British Columbia) Craig Lepine	(Alberta) Kurt Balderston	
1987	(British Columbia) Mike Chernoff		
1988	(British Columbia) Dan Cleutinx	(British Columbia) Eric Wiltzen	$55,000
1989	(British Columbia) Earl Blom	(British Columbia) Jim Armstrong	
1990	(British Columbia) Al Moore	(British Columbia) Eric Wiltzen	
1991	(British Columbia) Michael Vavrek	(Saskatchewan) Al Lind	
1992	(Alberta) Mickey Pendergast	(Alberta) Adrian Bakker	$33,250
1993	(British Columbia) Al Moore	(British Columbia) Rob Kuroyama	
1994	(Ontario) Al Hackner	(British Columbia) Sandy MacDonald	$36,000
1995	(British Columbia) Ed Dezura	(British Columbia) Brad Clark	
1996	(Sweden) Peja Lindholm	(Alberta) Terry Meek	$34,400
1997	(British Columbia) Bert Gretzinger	(Alberta) Mickey Pendergast	
1998	(Alberta) Randy Ferbey	(British Columbia) Greg McAulay	
1999	(British Columbia) Greg McAulay	(British Columbia) Brent Giles	
2000	(Alberta) Dennis Graber	(British Columbia) Barry McPhee	
2001	(Alberta) Adrian Bakker	(British Columbia) Bert Gretzinger	$57,700
2002	(British Columbia) Mike Wood	(British Columbia) Bert Gretzinger	$35,800
2003	(British Columbia) Bert Gretzinger	(British Columbia) Rick Folk	$40,700
2004	(British Columbia) Bob Ursel	(British Columbia) Brian Windsor	$40,700
2005	(British Columbia) Bert Gretzinger	(United States) Pete Fenson	$48,000
2006	(Manitoba) Kerry Burtnyk	(British Columbia) Bob Ursel	$50,000
2007	(British Columbia) Bryan Miki	(British Columbia) Greg McAulay	$50,000
2008	(British Columbia) Rick Folk	(Alberta) Kevin Koe	$50,000
2009	(Alberta) Ted Appelman	(Alberta) Chris Schille	$34,000
2010	(British Columbia) Jim Cotter	(Alberta) Steve Petryk	$34,000
2011	(British Columbia) Andrew Bilesky	(British Columbia) Grant Olsen	$32,000
2012	(British Columbia) Brent Pierce	(Alberta) Jamie King	$32,000
2013	(British Columbia) Grant Dezura	(British Columbia) Dean Joanisse	$25,000
2014	(British Columbia) Brent Pierce	(British Columbia) Sean Geall	$30,000
2015	(British Columbia) Sean Geall	(British Columbia) Dean Joanisse	$26,000
2016	(British Columbia) Dean Joanisse	(South Korea) Kim Soo-hyuk	$26,000
2017	Event cancelled		
2018	(British Columbia) Sean Geall	(British Columbia) Josh Barry	$16,000
2019	(Japan) Yuta Matsumura	(British Columbia) Tyler Tardi	$16,000
2020	Cancelled due to the COVID-19 pandemic in British Columbia		
2021	(South Korea) Kim Soo-hyuk	(British Columbia) Jeff Richard	$12,200
2022	(Japan) Hayato Sato	(British Columbia) Brent Pierce	$15,000
2023	(British Columbia) Brent Pierce	(British Columbia) Kyler Kleibrink	$16,000
2024	(British Columbia) Jeff Richard	(British Columbia) Rob Nobert	$9,000
2025	(British Columbia) Richard Krell	(British Columbia) Mitch Young	$9,000

=== Women ===
Year	Winning skip	Runner-up skip	Purse (CAD)
1986	(Alberta) Phyl Raymond	(Alberta) Judy Pendergast	
1987	(Alberta) Carol Davis	(Alberta) Sandra Risebrough	
1988	(British Columbia) Julie Sutton	(British Columbia) Sheril Becker	
1989	(Alberta) Wendy Conn	(Alberta) Susan Seitz	
1990	(Manitoba) Connie Laliberte	(British Columbia) Sue Garvey	
1991	(British Columbia) Julie Sutton	(British Columbia) Cyndra McKinnon	
1992	(British Columbia) Kelley Owen		
1993	(British Columbia) Sheril Becker	(British Columbia) Allison MacInnes	
1994	(British Columbia) Sherry Heath	(British Columbia) Kelley Owen	
1995	(British Columbia) Sue Garvey	(British Columbia) Linda Kirton	
1996	(British Columbia) Pat Sanders	(British Columbia) Kelly MacKenzie	$20,000
1997	(British Columbia) Sue Garvey	(British Columbia) Georgina Wheatcroft	
1998	(Alberta) Sheila Heath	(British Columbia) Sherry Heath	
1999	(British Columbia) Allison MacInnes	(British Columbia) Chris Makarowski	
2000	(Alberta) Shannon Kleibrink	(British Columbia) Sherry Heath	
2001	(British Columbia) Shelley MacDonald		
2002	(British Columbia) Kelly Scott	(British Columbia) Marla Mallett	
2003	(British Columbia) Kelly Scott	(British Columbia) Tracey Jones	
2004	(Japan) Moe Meguro	(British Columbia) Colleen Hannah	
2005	(British Columbia) Toni Wells	(Japan) Ayumi Onodera	$24,000
2006	(British Columbia) Pat Sanders	(China) Wang Bingyu	$34,000
2007	(British Columbia) Kelly Scott	(British Columbia) Marla Mallett	$34,000
2008	(South Korea) Kim Mi-Yeon	(British Columbia) Marla Mallett	$34,000
2009	(British Columbia) Colleen Hannah	(Alberta) Faye White	$34,000
2010	(British Columbia) Allison MacInnes	(British Columbia) Marla Mallett	$34,000
2011	(Switzerland) Michèle Jäggi	(Russia) Olga Zyablikova	$34,000
2012	(China) Wang Bingyu	(Denmark) Lene Nielsen	$34,000
2013	(United States) Allison Pottinger	(Japan) Ayumi Ogasawara	$35,000
2014	(Japan) Ayumi Ogasawara	(British Columbia) Kelly Scott	$30,000
2015	(South Korea) Gim Un-chi	(Japan) Satsuki Fujisawa	$26,000
2016	(South Korea) Kim Min-ji	(Japan) Satsuki Fujisawa	$26,000
2017	(British Columbia) Dailene Pewarchuk	(British Columbia) Patti Knezevic	$12,000
2018	(British Columbia) Sarah Wark	(British Columbia) Kim Slattery	$9,950
2019	(British Columbia) Corryn Brown	(China) Han Siyu	$9,950
2020	Cancelled due to the COVID-19 pandemic in British Columbia		
2021	Event cancelled		
2022	(British Columbia) Corryn Brown	(British Columbia) Diane Gushulak	$11,000
2023	(British Columbia) Corryn Brown	(British Columbia) Kim Dennis	$10,000
2024	(British Columbia) Steph Jackson-Baier	(Japan) Yuina Miura	$8,000
2025	(Japan) Miyu Ueno	(British Columbia) Kelsey Powell	$9,000
