= 2017 Kamloops Crown of Curling =

- Host city: Kamloops, British Columbia
- Arena: Kamloops Curling Club
- Dates: October 20–23
- Winner: (British Columbia) Dailene Pewarchuk
- Curling club: Victoria
- Skip: Dailene Pewarchuk
- Third: Rachelle Kallechy
- Second: Adina Tasaka
- Lead: Patty Wallingham
- Finalist: (British Columbia) Patti Knezevic

The 2017 Kamloops Crown of Curling was held from October 20 to 23 at the Kamloops Curling Club in Kamloops, British Columbia as part of the 2017–18 World Curling Tour.

== Teams ==
The teams are listed as follows

Skip	Third	Second	Lead	Locale
Corryn Brown	Erin Pincott	Dezaray Hawes	Samantha Fisher	Kamloops, British Columbia
Shiela Cowan	Donna Langlands	Crystal Murray	Victoria Murphy	Cloverdale, British Columbia
Holly Donaldson	Lindsay Hudyma	Steph Jackson-Baier	Carley Sandwith	Victoria / Vancouver, British Columbia
Kerry Galusha	Sarah Koltun	Megan Koehler	Shona Barbour	Yellowknife, Northwest Territories
Diane Gushulak	Grace MacInnes	Jessie Sanderson	Sandra Comadina	New Westminster, British Columbia
Kayte Gyles	Shawna Jensen	Caitlin Campbell	Amanda Tipper	Cloverdale, British Columbia
Patti Knezevic	Brette Richards	Heather Tyre	Blaine DeJager	Lake Country, British Columbia
Mei Jie	Cao Ying	Fu Yi Wei	Yang Ying	Harbin, China
Lori Olsen	Kelsey Martin	Lisa Robitaille	Theresa Tourand	Kamloops, British Columbia
Dailene Pewarchuk	Rachelle Kallechy	Adina Tasaka	Patty Wallingham	Victoria, British Columbia
Kelly Shimizu	Rebecca Stevenson	Michelle MacLeod	Mariah Coulombe	Richmond, British Columbia
Alyssa Kyllo	Kelsi Jones	Morgayne Eby	Kim Slattery (skip)	Vernon, British Columbia
Karla Thompson	Kristen Recksiedler	Shannon Joanisse	Trysta Vandale	Kamloops, British Columbia
Kesa Van Osch	Marika Van Osch	Kalia Van Osch	Amy Gibson	Nanaimo, British Columbia
Sarah Wark	Kristen Pilote	Jen Rusnell	Michelle Dunn	Chilliwack, British Columbia

== Round-robin standings ==
Key
Teams to Playoffs
Teams to Tiebreaker

Pool A	W	L
(British Columbia) Kim Slattery	3	1
(British Columbia) Karla Thompson	3	1
(British Columbia) Patti Knezevic	3	1
(China) Mei Jie	1	3
(British Columbia) Shelia Cowan	0	4

Pool B	W	L
(British Columbia) Dailene Pewarchuk	4	0
(British Columbia) Kesa Van Osch	3	1
(British Columbia) Diane Gushulak	1	3
(British Columbia) Kelly Shimizu	1	3
(Northwest Territories) Kerry Galusha	1	3

Pool C	W	L
(British Columbia) Lori Olson	3	1
(British Columbia) Corryn Brown	3	1
(British Columbia) Sarah Wark	2	2
(British Columbia) Holly Donaldson	2	2
(British Columbia) Kayte Gyles	0	4

== Scores ==
=== Draw 1 ===
Galusha 5-8 Shimzu

Pewarchuk 6-5 Van Osch

Wark 2-6 Donaldson

Gyles 7-12 Olson

Slattery 7-4 Cowan

Knezivic 11-5 Mei

=== Draw 2 ===
Mei 9-4 Cowan

Pewarchuk 8-5 Gushulak

Wark 9-6 Gyles

Thompson 7-3 Knesivic

Van Osch 5-3 Shimizu

=== Draw 3 ===
Knesivic 10-3 Cowan

Galusha 6-3 Gushulak

Pewarchuk 8-2 Shimizu

Brown 7-3 Gyles

Olson 7-5 Donaldson

Slattery 4-3 Thompson

=== Draw 4 ===
Van Osch 7-5 Galusha

Wark 8-7 Olson

Thompson 6-3 Cowan

Gushulak 7-2 Shimzu

Mei 3-6 Slattery

Brown 7-0 Donaldson

=== Draw 5 ===
Donaldson 7-0 Gyles

Thompson 5-2 Mei

Brown 6-5 Wark

Gushulak 3-6 Van Osch

Kneszivic 6-4 Slattery

=== Tiebreaker ===
- (British Columbia) Patti Knezevic 6-4 (British Columbia) Karla Thompson

== Playoffs ==
Quarterfinals
(British Columbia) Corryn Brown	5
(British Columbia) Kesa Van Osch	8
(British Columbia) Lori Olson	6
(British Columbia) Patti Knezevic	7

Semifinals
(British Columbia) Dailene Pewarchuk	9
(British Columbia) Kesa Van Osch	1
(British Columbia) Kim Slattery	5
(British Columbia) Patti Knezevic	6

Final
(British Columbia) Dailene Pewarchuk	8
(British Columbia) Patti Knezevic	5
