= Brent Giles =

Canadian curler

Medal record

Curling

Labatt Brier
Silver medal – second place	1982 Brandon	

Brent Marshall Giles (born November 11, 1953, in North Vancouver, British Columbia) is a Canadian curler from the Vancouver area. He is a two-time provincial men's champion and 1982 Brier runner up.

== Career ==
=== Juniors ===
Giles and his Carson Graham Secondary School rink of Mike Gardiner, Graham King and Garth Moore won the British Columbia Boy's High School Championships in 1971. This earned the North Vancouver team the right to represent British Columbia at the 1971 Canadian high school boys' curling championships (today known as the Canadian Junior Curling Championships). The team finished with a 6–4 record at nationals, in a three-way tie for third.

=== Early career (1971–1978) ===
After high school, Giles would join the Bernie Sparkes rink at second. The team, which includes Giles' brothers Brock and Brad begun the 1971-72 season by winning the $14,000 B.C. Centennial Totem Bonspiel, with Brad skipping while Sparkes was away due to business. Later that season the team won the BC Men's Curling Championship defeating the Kevin Smale rink 2 games to 0 in the best of three final. The team then represented British Columbia at the 1972 Macdonald Brier, finishing with a 5–5 record, tied for sixth.

Giles left the Sparkes rink after the season, forming his own team for the 1972-73 season with Max Gordon, Craig Rampton and brother Brad. The team began the season by winning the $5,500 Evergreen Tournament of Champions, taking home $2,400 for the win. The team did not make it to provincials that year, being eliminated in the Pacific Coast Curling Association playdowns. The team was eliminated from the Greater Vancouver playdowns the following season in 1974.

Giles with his brothers Brock and Brad plus Clark Winterton won the $10,500 Kamloops Crown of Curling bonspiel to begin the 1974-75 season. The team again failed to make it to provincials, being eliminated in their zone playdowns.

In February 1977 Pierce and his rink of brother Brock, Bryon Bettesworth and Bob Ward were one of the three BC teams to participate in the unique Western Canada Provincial Team Championship, where he led his team to a 2–4 record, missing the championship round.

=== Brier runner-up team (1978–1989) ===
In 1978 Giles formed a new team with Greg Monkman, Al Roemer and brother Brad after having played for his other brother Brock the previous season. In 1980, the tean won the $30,000 "Tournament of Champions" bonspiel in Prince George over Calgary's Frank Morisette. The next season, the team won the 1982 BC Labatt Tankard, the men's provincial championship over Bert Gretzinger in a triple knockout. The team represented British Columbia at the 1982 Labatt Brier, where Giles led his rink to a 9-2 round robin record in first place. This put them into the final against Northern Ontario's Al Hackner, whom they lost to 7-3. The following season, the team could not even make it to the provincial championship, being eliminated from the 1983 Pacific Coast Curling Association's last chance qualifier event, losing all four of their games in playdown play (including zones).

The Giles rink did make it to the 1984 BC Championships, where they were ousted by Bernie Sparkes in the B Final. Sparkes, who went on to win the BC Championships picked Giles to be the team's alternate at the 1984 Labatt Brier. When third Jim Armstrong was unable to play in a game due to back spasms, Giles stepped in.

The next season, the Giles rink won the $37,300 Labatt's Abbotsford-Clearbrook Curling Classic. The team didn't make it to provincials that season, but returned in 1986 where they were eliminated after losing a game to Allister Frame.

In the Fall of 1986 Giles and his rink were invited to a training camp which was held to help determine Canada's representative at the 1988 Winter Olympics, where curling was a demonstration event. They did not play in the 1987 Canadian Olympic Curling Trials. Later that season the team played in the 1987 BC Men's Championship where they were eliminated by the Brian Gessner rink.

The 1987 Olympic Trials were won by the Ed Lukowich rink, which played a series of exhibition games in the Fall to prepare themselves for the Olympics, including a game against Giles. Giles upset Lukowich by a 9-5 score on October 11, 1987. Later that season the team played in the 1988 BC Championships, making it all the way to the semifinal where they lost to eventual winner Ron Thompson.

The Giles rink began the 1988-89 curling season by winning the $60,000 Vernon Carspiel, with each member of the team winning Chevrolet Sprints. The team failed to make it to provincials that year, and after nearly a dozen seasons together they broke up in 1989, with Giles being replaced as skip by Jim Armstrong. Giles formed a new team with Ron Thompson, Al Moore and Rob Robinson.

=== Later men's career (1989–2004) ===
After failing to qualify for the BC provincial with his new team, Giles attended his fourth Brier in 1990 as the alternate for Team BC, skipped by Craig Lepine. He would not play in any games. For the 1990-91 season, Giles got a new front end of Ken McArdle and Ed Fowler. The team made it to the 1991 BC Provincial championships, where they were eliminated by the eventual winners Gerry Kent.

In February 1991, Giles was transferred to Kelowna and began skipping a team of Rob Koffski, Greg McCune and Dave Stephenson for the 1991-92 season. Giles moved back to Surrey in the Greater Vancouver Area in November 1991 but the team stuck together for the remainder of the season. The team, curling out of the Kelowna Curling Club lost in the 1992 BC Men's Final to Jim Armstrong.

In 1992 Giles formed a new team with brother Brad and twins Dan and Fred Cleutinx. The new look rink did not make it to provincials that season, losing out in the Pacific playdowns. The team played in the $120,000 1993 V.O. Cup, the inaugural edition of what is now the Players' Championship to cap the very first World Curling Tour season. They were eliminated in the triple knockout event with just win.

In December 1993, Dan Cleutinx took over as skip of the Giles rink. The Cleutinx led-team went 4–3 at the 1994 BC Labatt Tankard provincial championship, just missing out at a playoff spot.

In 1994, Giles joined forces with rival Jim Armstrong as skip and Tony Stevens and brother Brad playing front end. The team began the season by winning the Vernon Double Cash event with Bryan Miki playing second. They also won the Labatt's Abbotsford-Clearbook Curling Classic with Bill Fisher at second. The team went on to lose the final of the 1995 BC men's championship to Rick Folk. In 1995 the team added new second Dean Koyanagi but failed to even make it out of their zone in playdown play.

In 1996 Giles joined the Ken Maskiewich rink at third. The team were eliminated from playdown play that season in the Pacific Coast championship.

Giles began skipping his own rink again in 1997 with teammates Ron Thompson, Bill Rafter and brother Brad. He won the $10,00 Qualcomm cashspiel that season.

Giles did not return to the BC Men's provincial championships until 2001, whose team consisted of Ron Thompson, Ken Maskiewich and Bill Fisher. At provincials Giles led his rink to a 3–4 record.

=== Seniors and a return to men's (2004–2010) ===
In his first run in Seniors (50+) curling, Giles and teammates John Smiley, brother Brad and Brad Burton lost the 2005 provincial final to Jamie McTavish. Giles won the BC Senior Men's Curling Championship in 2006 playing second for Bert Gretzinger. The team, which also consisted of Rob Koffski and Doug Smith represented British Columbia at the 2006 Canadian Senior Curling Championships, where they lost in a tiebreaker.

Giles returned to copetetive men's curling in 2008, joining the Rick Folk rink at third. The team started the season off strong, winning the Kamloops Crown of Curling. The team played at the 2009 BC Men's Championship, finishing in fourth place. Giles made it to the men's provincials again in 2010 throwing second stones for Bert Gretzinger. This team would also finish fourth.

== Coaching ==
Giles coached the Jay Peachey rink at the 2005 Canadian Olympic Curling Trials. The following season he coached the Kelley Law rink at the 2007 Scotties Tournament of Hearts. In 2013, he coached the Kelly Scott rink at the 2013 Scotties Tournament of Hearts. In 2015, Giles coached the winning team at the mixed provincial championship.

== Personal life ==
At the time of the 1982 Brier, Giles worked for Crown Zellerbach and lived in Surrey. In his youth he worked at the Capilano Golf and Country Club, and also played hockey. He received a degree in commerce from the University of British Columbia. Giles married Agnes Hunter in 1985 in Reno. At the time they were living in North Delta, British Columbia.
