= 2012 Valley First Crown of Curling =

World Curling Tour event

- Host city: Kamloops, British Columbia
- Arena: Kamloops Curling Club
- Dates: October 19–22
- Men's winner: (British Columbia) Brent Pierce
- Skip: Brent Pierce
- Third: Jeff Richard
- Second: Kevin Recksiedler
- Lead: Grant Dezura
- Finalist: (Alberta) Jamie King
- Women's winner: (China) Wang Bingyu
- Skip: Wang Bingyu
- Third: Liu Yin
- Second: Yue Qingshuang
- Lead: Zhou Yan
- Finalist: (Denmark) Lene Nielsen

The 2012 Valley First Crown of Curling was held from October 19 to 22 at the Kamloops Curling Club in Kamloops, British Columbia as part of the 2012–13 World Curling Tour. For both the men's and women's events, the event was held in a triple knockout format, and the purses for the men's and women's events were CAD$34,000 each, of which the winners, Brent Pierce and Wang Bingyu, received CAD$8,000 each.

In the men's final, Pierce defeated Jamie King in the final in an extra end with a score of 7–6, while in the women's final, Wang defeated Lene Nielsen with a score of 6–4.

== Men ==
=== Teams ===
The teams are listed as follows:

Skip	Third	Second	Lead	Locale
Andrew Bilesky	Stephen Kopf	Derek Errington	Aaron Watson	Vancouver, British Columbia
Steve Birklid	Chris Bond	Matt Birklid	Atticus Wallace	(Washington (state)) Seattle, Washington
Brady Clark	Sean Beighton	Darren Lehto	Steve Lundeen	(Washington (state)) Seattle, Washington
Neil Dangerfield	Dennis Sutton	Darren Boden	Glen Allen	Victoria, British Columbia
Scott DeCap	Ron Douglas	John Maskiewich	Grant Olsen	Kamloops, British Columbia
Sean Geall	Jay Peachey	Sebastien Robillard	Mark Olson	New Westminster, British Columbia
Darrell Houston	Sean Matheson	Joe Dirt	Tyler Jaeger	Kamloops, British Columbia
Kim Chang-min	Kim Min-chan	Seong Se-hyeon	Seon Se-young	Uiseong, Gyeongbuk, South Korea
Mark Johnson	Jason Larway	Joel Larway	Christopher Rimple	(Washington (state)) Seattle, Washington
Jamie King	Blake MacDonald	Scott Pfeifer	Jeff Erickson	Edmonton, Alberta
Tyler Klymchuk	Corey Chester	Sanjay Bowry	Rhys Gamache	Vancouver, British Columbia
Ken McArdle	Jared Bowles	Dylan Somerton	Michael Horita	New Westminster, British Columbia
Jason Montgomery	Miles Craig	William Duggan	Josh Hozack	Duncan, British Columbia
Trevor Perepolkin	Tyler Orme	James Mackenzie	Chris Anderson	Vernon, British Columbia
Dan Petryk (fourth)	Steve Petryk (skip)	Roland Robinson	Thomas Usselman	Calgary, Alberta
Brent Pierce	Jeff Richard	Kevin Recksiedler	Grant Dezura	New Westminster, British Columbia
Graham Powell	Kelsey Dusseault	Ken Powell	Chris Wall	Grande Prairie, Alberta
Randie Shen	Brendon Liu	Nicolas Hsu	Justin Hsu	Taipei, Chinese Taipei
Mike Smith	Brad Thompson	Darren Nelson		Kamloops, British Columbia
Steve Waatainen	Kevin Weinrich	Sean Krepps	Keith Clarke	Nanaimo, British Columbia
Ken Watson	Dale Hockley	Randy Nelson	Dale Reibin	Surrey, British Columbia
Brent Yamada	Corey Sauer	Doug Murdoch	Lance Yamada	Kamloops, British Columbia

=== Knockout results ===
The draw is listed as follows:

==== A event ====
First Knockout		Semifinals		Qualifier 1
		(British Columbia) Brent Pierce	7
(British Columbia) Jason Montgomery	5	(British Columbia) Ken Watson	1
(British Columbia) Ken Watson	6			(British Columbia) Brent Pierce	7
(British Columbia) Neil Dangerfield	3			(British Columbia) Steve Waatainen	3
(British Columbia) Steve Waatainen	6	(British Columbia) Steve Waatainen	9
(British Columbia) Andrew Bilesky	2	(Washington (state)) Steve Birkild	4
(Washington (state)) Steve Birkild	7

First Knockout		Semifinals		Qualifier 2
		(Alberta) Steve Petryk	6
(Alberta) Graham Powell	3	(South Korea) Kim Chang-min	5
(South Korea) Kim Chang-min	5			(Alberta) Steve Petryk	5
(British Columbia) Trevor Perepolkin	6			(British Columbia) Trevor Perepolkin	4
(British Columbia) Mike Smith	5	(British Columbia) Trevor Perepolkin	7
(Washington (state)) Mark Johnson	4	(Chinese Taipei) Randie Shen	3
(Chinese Taipei) Randie Shen	5

First Knockout		Semifinals		Qualifier 3
(Alberta) Jamie King	5
(British Columbia) Tyler Klymchuk	6	(British Columbia) Tyler Klymchuk	2
(British Columbia) Ken McArdle	4	(British Columbia) Ken McArdle	6
(British Columbia) Brent Yamada	3			(British Columbia) Ken McArdle	6
(British Columbia) Sean Geall	7			(British Columbia) Scott DeCap	7
(British Columbia) Darrell Houston	4	(British Columbia) Sean Geall	4
(British Columbia) Scott DeCap	6	(British Columbia) Scott DeCap	8
(Washington (state)) Brady Clark	5

==== B event ====
Second Knockout
(British Columbia) Neil Dangerfield	6
(British Columbia) Andrew Bilesky	8

Quarterfinals
(British Columbia) Tyler Klymchuk	4
(British Columbia) Jason Montgomery	7
(British Columbia) Sean Geall	7
(British Columbia) Andrew Bilesky	4

Semifinals
(British Columbia) Jason Montgomery	1
(British Columbia) Sean Geall	7

Qualifier 4
(British Columbia) Sean Geall	5
(British Columbia) Trevor Perepolkin	3

Second Knockout
(British Columbia) Mike Smith	8
(Washington (state)) Mark Johnson	6

Quarterfinals
(British Columbia) Ken Watson	8
(Alberta) Graham Powell	3
(Washington (state)) Steve Birkild	4
(British Columbia) Mike Smith	6

Semifinals
(British Columbia) Ken Watson	3
(British Columbia) Mike Smith	5

Qualifier 5
(British Columbia) Mike Smith	7
(British Columbia) Ken McArdle	5

Second Knockout
(Alberta) Jamie King	8
(British Columbia) Brent Yamada	2
(British Columbia) Darrell Houston	2
(Washington (state)) Brady Clark	7

Quarterfinals
(South Korea) Kim Chang-min	3
(Alberta) Jamie King	7
(Chinese Taipei) Randie Shen	8
(Washington (state)) Brady Clark	4

Semifinals
(Alberta) Jamie King	7
(Chinese Taipei) Randie Shen	2

Qualifier 6
(Alberta) Jamie King	7
(British Columbia) Steve Waatainen	0

==== C event ====
Third Knockout
(British Columbia) Neil Dangerfield	9
(British Columbia) Darrell Houston	3
(Washington (state)) Mark Johnson	5
(British Columbia) Brent Yamada	3

Quarterfinals
(British Columbia) Tyler Klymchuk	5
(British Columbia) Andrew Bilesky	2
(British Columbia) Neil Dangerfield	8
(Chinese Taipei) Randie Shen	2
(Washington (state)) Brady Clark	5
(Washington (state)) Mark Johnson	4

Semifinals
(British Columbia) Tyler Klymchuk	3
(British Columbia) Neil Dangerfield	6
(Washington (state)) Mark Johnson	3
(British Columbia) Ken McArdle	5

Qualifier 7
(British Columbia) Neil Dangerfield	5
(British Columbia) Ken McArdle	3

Third Knockout
(Alberta) Graham Powell	3
(South Korea) Kim Chang-min	9

Quarterfinals
(British Columbia) Jason Montgomery	6
(British Columbia) Ken Watson	4
(Washington (state)) Steve Birkild	8
(South Korea) Kim Chang-min	2

Semifinals
(British Columbia) Steve Waatanien	8
(British Columbia) Jason Montgomery	2
(British Columbia) Trevor Perepolkin	5
(Washington (state)) Steve Birkild	4

Qualifier 8
(British Columbia) Steve Waatanien	2
(British Columbia) Trevor Perepolkin	6

=== Playoffs ===
Quarterfinals
(British Columbia) Brent Pierce	6
(British Columbia) Trevor Perepolkin	5
(British Columbia) Scott DeCap	6
(British Columbia) Mike Smith	3
(Alberta) Steve Petryk	5
(British Columbia) Neil Dangerfield	9
(British Columbia) Sean Geall	4
(Alberta) Jamie King	7

Semifinals
(British Columbia) Brent Pierce	7
(British Columbia) Scott DeCap	3
(British Columbia) Neil Dangerfield	2
(Alberta) Jamie King	8

Final
(British Columbia) Brent Pierce	7
(Alberta) Jamie King	6

== Women ==
=== Teams ===
The teams are listed as follows:

Skip	Third	Second	Lead	Locale
Corryn Brown	Erin Pincott	Samantha Fisher	Sydney Fraser	Kamloops, British Columbia
Kerri Einarson	Sara Van Walleghem	Liz Fyfe	Krysten Karwacki	Winnipeg, Manitoba
Lisa Eyamie	Maria Bushell	Jodi Marthaller	Valerie Hamende	High River, Alberta
Kirsten Fox	Kristen Recksiedler	Trysta Vandale	Dawn Suliak	New Westminster, British Columbia
Simone Groundwater				Williams Lake, British Columbia
Jiang Yilun	Wang Rui	Yaoi Mingyue	She Quitong	Harbin, China
Kim Eun-jung	Kim Gyeong-ae	Kim Seon-yeong	Kim Yeong-mi	Gyeongbuk, South Korea
Sarah Koltun	Chelsea Duncan	Patty Wallingham	Jenna Duncan	Whitehorse, Yukon
Roberta Kuhn	Karla Thompson	Michelle Ramsay	Christen Wilson	Vernon, British Columbia
Allison MacInnes	Grace MacInnes	Diane Gushulak	Jacalyn Brown	Kamloops, British Columbia
Marla Mallett	Kelly Shimizu	Shannon Ward	Barb Zbeetnoff	Cloverdale, British Columbia
Ekaterina Antonova (fourth)	Victorya Moiseeva (skip)	Galina Arsenkina	Aleksandra Saitova	Moscow, Russia
Kristie Moore	Blaine Richards	Michelle Dykstra	Amber Cheveldave	Grande Prairie, Alberta
Lene Nielsen	Helle Simonsen	Jeanne Ellegaard	Maria Poulsen	Hvidovre, Denmark
Ayumi Ogasawara	Yumie Funayama	Kaho Onodera	Michiko Tomabechi	Sapporo, Japan
Lori Olsen	Heather Tyre	Christine Ledrew		Kamloops, British Columbia
Marilou Richter	Darah Provencal	Jessie Sanderson	Sandra Comadina	New Westminster, British Columbia
Kristen Fewster (fourth)	Jen Rusnell (skip)	Patti Knezevic	Rhonda Camozzi	Prince George, British Columbia
Desiree Schmidt	Brittany Palmer	Courtney Schmidt	Heather Nichol	Castlegar, British Columbia
Adina Tasaka	Rachelle Kallechy	Lindsae Page	Kelsi Jones	New Westminster, British Columbia
Kelly Thompson	Susan Hicks	Lisa Robitaille	Kimberly Hall	Castlegar, British Columbia
Brandi Tinkler	Ashley Nordin	Alexandra Nash-McLeod		Victoria, British Columbia
Wang Bingyu	Liu Yin	Yue Qingshuang	Zhou Yan	Harbin, China
Sayaka Yoshimura	Rina Ida	Risa Ujihara	Mao Ishigaki	Sapporo, Japan

=== Knockout results ===
The draw is listed as follows:

==== A event ====
First Knockout		Semifinals		Qualifier 1
(China) Wang Bingyu	4
(British Columbia) Kirsten Fox	6	(British Columbia) Kirsten Fox	7
(Japan) Ayumi Ogasawara	2	(British Columbia) Lori Olsen	4
(British Columbia) Lori Olsen	8			(British Columbia) Kirsten Fox	2
(British Columbia) Adina Tasaka	6			(British Columbia) Allison MacInnes	8
(British Columbia) Brandi Tinkler	8	(British Columbia) Brandi Tinkler	2
(British Columbia) Allison MacInnes	8	(British Columbia) Allison MacInnes	8
(British Columbia) Desiree Schmidt	4

First Knockout		Semifinals		Qualifier 2
(Russia) Victorya Moiseeva	7
(Yukon) Sarah Koltun	2	(Russia) Victorya Moiseeva	2
(South Korea) Kim Eun-jung	8	(South Korea) Kim Eun-jung	9
(British Columbia) Jen Rusnell	2			(South Korea) Kim Eun-jung	L
(Alberta) Lisa Eyamie	2			(British Columbia) Marla Mallett	W
(China) Jiang Yilun	6	(China) Jiang Yilun	0
(British Columbia) Marla Mallett	4	(British Columbia) Marla Mallett	8
(British Columbia) Kelly Thompson	2

First Knockout		Semifinals		Qualifier 3
(British Columbia) Kristie Moore	7
(British Columbia) Corryn Brown	5	(British Columbia) Kristie Moore	4
(British Columbia) Marilou Richter	9	(British Columbia) Marilou Richter	7
(Japan) Sayaka Yoshimura	2			(British Columbia) Marilou Richter	5
(British Columbia) Roberta Kuhn	2			(Manitoba) Kerri Einarson	6
(Manitoba) Kerri Einarson	4	(Manitoba) Kerri Einarson	7
(Denmark) Lene Nielsen	8	(Denmark) Lene Nielsen	4
(British Columbia) Simone Groundwater	4

==== B event ====
Second Knockout
(China) Wang Bingyu	4
(Japan) Ayumi Ogasawara	7
(British Columbia) Adina Tasaka	5
(British Columbia) Desiree Schmidt	6

Quarterfinals
(British Columbia) Kristie Moore	5
(Japan) Ayumi Ogasawara	6
(Denmark) Lene Nielsen	1
(British Columbia) Desiree Schmidt	8

Semifinals
(Japan) Ayumi Ogasawara	6
(British Columbia) Desiree Schmidt	7

Qualifier 4
(British Columbia) Desiree Schmidt	3
(South Korea) Kim Eun-jung	6

Second Knockout
(Yukon) Sarah Koltun	6
(British Columbia) Jen Rusnell	4
(Alberta) Lisa Eyamie	7
(British Columbia) Kelly Thompson	1

Quarterfinals
(British Columbia) Lori Olsen	1
(Yukon) Sarah Koltun	8
(British Columbia) Brandi Tinkler	2
(Alberta) Lisa Eyamie	10

Semifinals
(Yukon) Sarah Koltun	4
(Alberta) Lisa Eyamie	2

Qualifier 5
(Yukon) Sarah Koltun	7
(British Columbia) Marilou Richter	4

Second Knockout
(British Columbia) Corryn Brown	3
(Japan) Sayaka Yoshimura	10
(British Columbia) Roberta Kuhn	9
(British Columbia) Simone Groundwater	6

Quarterfinals
(Russia) Victorya Moiseeva	7
(Japan) Sayaka Yoshimura	2
(China) Jiang Yilun	3
(British Columbia) Roberta Kuhn	9

Semifinals
(Russia) Victorya Moiseeva	8
(British Columbia) Roberta Kuhn	2

Qualifier 6
(Russia) Victorya Moiseeva	7
(British Columbia) Kirsten Fox	6

==== C event ====
Third Knockout
(British Columbia) Lori Olsen	7
(British Columbia) Brandi Tinkler	3
(Japan) Sayaka Yoshimura	6
(China) Jiang Yilun	7

Quarterfinals
(British Columbia) Kristen Moore	6
(Denmark) Lene Nielsen	7
(British Columbia) Lori Olsen	4
(British Columbia) Roberta Kuhn	5
(Japan) Ayumi Ogasawara	2
(China) Jiang Yilun	7

Semifinals
(Denmark) Lene Nielsen	5
(British Columbia) Roberta Kuhn	2
(China) Jiang Yilun	7
(British Columbia) Marilou Richter	3

Qualifier 7
(Denmark) Lene Nielsen	8
(China) Jiang Yilun	1

Third Knockout
(China) Wang Bingyu	7
(British Columbia) Adina Tasaka	3
(British Columbia) Jen Rusnell	7
(British Columbia) Kelly Thompson	1
(British Columbia) Corryn Brown	3
(British Columbia) Simone Groundwater	8

Quarterfinals
(China) Wang Bingyu	10
(Alberta) Lisa Eyamie	4
(British Columbia) Jen Rusnell	5
(British Columbia) Simone Groundwater	8

Semifinals
(British Columbia) Kirsten Fox	3
(China) Wang Bingyu	4
(British Columbia) Desiree Schmidt	5
(British Columbia) Simone Groundwater	2

Qualifier 8
(China) Wang Bingyu	9
(British Columbia) Desiree Schmidt	3

=== Playoffs ===
Quarterfinals
(British Columbia) Allison MacInnes	1
(China) Wang Bingyu	7
(Manitoba) Kerri Einarson	5
(Yukon) Sarah Koltun	8
(British Columbia) Marla Mallett	3
(Denmark) Lene Nielsen	8
(South Korea) Kim Eun-jung	5
(Russia) Victorya Moiseeva	4

Semifinals
(China) Wang Bingyu	8
(Yukon) Sarah Koltun	2
(Denmark) Lene Nielsen	6
(South Korea) Kim Eun-jung	4

Final
(China) Wang Bingyu	6
(Denmark) Lene Nielsen	4
