= Natter (surname) =

Natter is a surname. Notable people with the surname include:

- Boniface Natter, first post-Reformation abbot of Buckfast Abbey
- Gérard Natter, French curler
- Lorenz Natter (1705–1763), German engraver and medallist
- Robert J. Natter, United States Navy admiral
- Tobias G. Natter, Austrian art historian and museum director
