= 1982 Air Canada Silver Broom =

- Host city: Garmisch-Partenkirchen, Germany
- Arena: Olympic Eisstadion
- Dates: March 29 – April 4, 1982
- Winner: Canada
- Curling club: Fort William CC, Thunder Bay, Ontario
- Skip: Al Hackner
- Third: Rick Lang
- Second: Bob Nicol
- Lead: Bruce Kennedy
- Finalist: Switzerland (Jürg Tanner)

The 1982 Air Canada Silver Broom, the men's world curling championship, was held from March 29 to April 4 at the Olympic Eisstadion in Garmisch-Partenkirchen, Germany.

== Teams ==
Canada	Denmark	France	Germany	Italy
Fort William CC, Thunder Bay, Ontario Skip: Al Hackner; Third: Rick Lang; Second: Bob Nicol; Lead: Bruce Kennedy; Alternate: Al Fiskar	Hvidovre CC, Hvidovre Skip: Per Berg; Third: Gert Larsen; Second: Jan Hansen; Lead: Michael Harry	Beifort CC Fourth: André Tronc; Third: Roger Jacobs; Second: Bob Lehn; Skip: Gérard Natter	CC Schwenningen Skip: Keith Wendorf; Third: Hans Dieter Kiesel; Second: Sven Saile; Lead: Heiner Martin	Tofane CC, Cortina d'Ampezzo Skip: Andrea Pavani; Third: Giancarlo Valt; Second: Enrico Alberti; Lead: Enea Pavani
Norway	Scotland	Sweden	Switzerland	United States
Brumunddal CC, Oslo Skip: Sjur Loen; Third: Morten Søgaard; Second: Morten Skaug; Lead: Dagfinn Loen	Carrington CC, Edinburgh Skip: Colin Hamilton; Third: David Ramsay; Second: W. Michael Dick; Lead: Richard Pretsel	Karlstads CK Skip: Sören Grahn; Third: Connie Östlund; Second: Niclas Järund; Lead: Tony Eng	Lausanne-Riviera CC Skip: Jürg Tanner; Third: Jürg Hornisberger; Second: Patrik Lörtscher; Lead: Franz Tanner	Madison CC, Madison, Wisconsin Skip: Steve Brown; Third: Ed Sheffield; Second: Huns Gustrowsky; Lead: George Godfrey

== Round-robin standings ==
Key
Teams to playoffs
Teams to tiebreaker

Country	Skip	W	L
Canada	Al Hackner	7	2
Germany	Keith Wendorf	5	4
Switzerland	Jürg Tanner	5	4
Sweden	Sören Grahn	5	4
Italy	Andrea Pavani	5	4
Norway	Sjur Loen	5	4
Scotland	Colin Hamilton	4	5
Denmark	Per Berg	4	5
United States	Steve Brown	4	5
France	Gérard Natter	1	8

== Round-robin results ==
=== Draw 1 ===
Team	Final
Switzerland (Tanner)	2
Scotland (Hamilton)	8

Team	Final
Norway (Loen)	8
Denmark (Berg)	5

Team	Final
Canada (Hackner)	10
Germany (Wendorf)	3

Team	Final
France (Natter)	5
Sweden (Grahn)	8

Team	Final
Italy (Pavani)	6
United States (Brown)	10

=== Draw 2 ===
Team	Final
Denmark (Berg)	4
France (Natter)	5

Team	Final
Germany (Wendorf)	4
Italy (Pavani)	5

Team	Final
Sweden (Grahn)	2
Switzerland (Tanner)	9

Team	Final
United States (Brown)	8
Norway (Loen)	5

Team	Final
Canada (Hackner)	6
Scotland (Hamilton)	5

=== Draw 3 ===
Team	Final
Norway (Loen)	7
Germany (Wendorf)	9

Team	Final
Canada (Hackner)	11
Sweden (Grahn)	4

Team	Final
France (Natter)	2
United States (Brown)	4

Team	Final
Scotland (Hamilton)	4
Italy (Pavani)	5

Team	Final
Denmark (Berg)	5
Switzerland (Tanner)	8

=== Draw 4 ===
Team	Final
United States (Brown)	4
Canada (Hackner)	8

Team	Final
Scotland (Hamilton)	11
France (Natter)	3

Team	Final
Italy (Pavani)	6
Denmark (Berg)	8

Team	Final
Switzerland (Tanner)	6
Germany (Wendorf)	7

Team	Final
Norway (Loen)	5
Sweden (Grahn)	7

=== Draw 5 ===
Team	Final
Germany (Wendorf)	6
Sweden (Grahn)	5

Team	Final
United States (Brown)	5
Switzerland (Tanner)	6

Team	Final
Norway (Loen)	5
Canada (Hackner)	4

Team	Final
Italy (Pavani)	8
France (Natter)	2

Team	Final
Scotland (Hamilton)	5
Denmark (Berg)	4

=== Draw 6 ===
Team	Final
Canada (Hackner)	8
Denmark (Berg)	6

Team	Final
Italy (Pavani)	5
Norway (Loen)	6

Team	Final
Switzerland (Tanner)	10
France (Natter)	3

Team	Final
Sweden (Grahn)	8
Scotland (Hamilton)	6

Team	Final
United States (Brown)	5
Germany (Wendorf)	4

=== Draw 7 ===
Team	Final
France (Natter)	4
Norway (Loen)	5

Team	Final
Switzerland (Tanner)	3
Canada (Hackner)	7

Team	Final
Germany (Wendorf)	8
Scotland (Hamilton)	2

Team	Final
Denmark (Berg)	7
United States (Brown)	4

Team	Final
Sweden (Grahn)	9
Italy (Pavani)	3

=== Draw 8 ===
Team	Final
Scotland (Hamilton)	6
United States (Brown)	5

Team	Final
France (Natter)	3
Germany (Wendorf)	8

Team	Final
Denmark (Berg)	7
Sweden (Grahn)	6

Team	Final
Italy (Pavani)	5
Canada (Hackner)	4

Team	Final
Switzerland (Tanner)	5
Norway (Loen)	3

=== Draw 9 ===
Team	Final
Italy (Pavani)	6
Switzerland (Tanner)	5

Team	Final
Sweden (Grahn)	5
United States (Brown)	3

Team	Final
Scotland (Hamilton)	4
Norway (Loen)	6

Team	Final
Germany (Wendorf)	6
Denmark (Berg)	7

Team	Final
France (Natter)	2
Canada (Hackner)	9

== Tiebreakers ==
Sheet D	1	2	3	4	5	6	7	8	9	10	11	Final
Norway (Loen) 🔨	1	0	0	0	0	1	0	1	0	0	0	3
Sweden (Grahn)	0	0	0	2	1	0	0	0	0	0	1	4

Sheet E	1	2	3	4	5	6	7	8	9	10	Final
Italy (Pavani) 🔨	0	0	0	1	0	1	0	1	X	X	3
Switzerland (Tanner)	2	2	1	0	1	0	2	0	X	X	8

== Playoffs ==
Semifinals
1	Canada	5
4	Sweden	3
2	Germany	4
3	Switzerland	7

Final
1	Canada	9
3	Switzerland	7

=== Semifinals ===
Sheet B	1	2	3	4	5	6	7	8	9	10	Final
Germany (Wendorf)	0	0	0	1	0	0	2	0	1	0	4
Switzerland (Tanner) 🔨	1	1	1	0	1	0	0	1	0	2	7

Sheet D	1	2	3	4	5	6	7	8	9	10	Final
Canada (Hackner)	0	0	0	1	0	2	0	0	2	0	5
Sweden (Grahn) 🔨	0	0	0	0	1	0	1	1	0	0	3

=== Final ===
Sheet C	1	2	3	4	5	6	7	8	9	10	Final
Canada (Hackner)	2	0	2	1	0	1	0	2	0	1	9
Switzerland (Tanner) 🔨	0	1	0	0	1	0	2	0	3	0	7

1982 Air Canada Silver Broom
(Canada)
Canada
14th title
