= Crystal Murray =

French R&B singer-songwriter

- Born: December 8, 2001 (age 24); Paris, France
- Occupation: Singer-songwriter
- Years active: 2019-present
- Parents: David Murray (father); Valérie Malot (mother)
- Website: https://crystal-murray.com/

Crystal Murray (born 8 December 2001 in Paris, France), is a Franco-American singer-songwriter. Starting her musical career in 2018 by signing to the British label Because Music, her songs are inspired by a mix of R&B, neo-soul, jazz, funk and house.

== Early life ==
Crystal Murray was born and raised in Paris. She is the daughter of American jazz saxophonist David Murray and Valérie Malot, music producer who runs 3D FAMILY, a jazz and world music production company, representing artists like Amadou et Mariam, Les Amazones d'Afriques, Theo Croker, Lakecia Benjamin or Nneka.

In 2016, she and a group of friends created the Gucci Gang, a crew of influencers associated with the Parisian art and fashion scene. It's alongside this group that she posed for the cover of Jalouse Magazine (March 2017), or appeared in magazines like Vogue, Love or Miaou, through which the group shot a video campaign with Travis Scott.

She also modeled for several advertising campaigns, such as Forever Chuck campaign by Converse (2017) or the Commuter Campaign for Beats by Dre (2019). In 2019, with French association Safe Place, the group has used their platform to give survivors of sexual harassment a way to speak out about their experiences.

In 2020, Crystal Murray launched Spin Desire with 3D FAMILY, a label focused on the nightclub scene through the creation of DJ sets and parties. With this label, Crystal Murray collaborates with artists from the night scene such as Elheist or Thee Dian with the Hotel Room Drama series. Inspiring itself from alternative forms of art, Spin Desires performs in European capitals such as London, Barcelona or Berlin. In an interview for Dazed, Crystal Murray affirms: “People love to put labels on young people and artists, my generation is not agreeing with the boxes people want to put us in. We want to break the rules and boundaries.”

== Collaborations ==
Since 2019, Crystal Murray has been the face of the Converse brand and is currently in collaboration with Adidas.

In 2019, her single Princess was used as music in a Dior ad. Similarly, in 2024, Payback was used to promote the National Women's Soccer League by the American sports network ESPN.

== Musical career ==
Crystal Murray starts off her career through the release of the single After Ten in 2018, a song taking inspirations from R&B and soul. The track ended up at the top of talent playlists of Spotify and Deezer and made her one of the most promising artists of 2019. Her debut EP I Was Wrong was released in 2020 through the label Because Music and cemented her rising-star status.

In 2020, she released "Princess" and "August Knows". The tracks are featured on the soundtrack of Cédric Klapisch's 2019 film Deux moi. Klapisch later directed the video clip for "August Knows".

In 2021, she started her HOTEL ROOM DRAMA Concept, featuring a series of music video clips and collaborations such as GGGB with Thee Diane and CREEPS with Elheist.

On February 11, 2022, Murray released an EP titled Twisted Bases, composed of singles such as BOSS which has been revealed through a COLORS show, Other Men with Le Diouck and Thee Diane, Masterclass with Le Diouck and Thee Diane, and Break in collaboration with Detroit-based rapper Zelooperz.

Murray is set to release her first album, Sad Lovers & Giants on May 31, 2024, with several singles such as STARMANIAK or Air with producer Kyu Steed known for his work with Amaarae, Eddy de Pretto and Booba. This album sees her music gliding from soul to alternative. The album will also feature British producers such as Benji Flow, COLTRANE or KZDidIt, known for his work with Babyface.

== Artistry and influences ==
Crystal Murray cites African-American music as her main influence, jazz being a major influence, as she frequented jazz clubs and often accompanied her father on tours. Growing up, she listened to Macy Gray, John Coltrane, Marvin Gaye, Minnie Ripperton and Beyoncé. Crystal Murray's releases take inspirations from soul and R&B, having cited Kelis, Macy Gray or Betty Davis as her major musical influences, as well as artists like Björk or Tame Impala. As for more recent artists, Crystal Murray cites artists like Serpentwithfeet, Amaarae, Santigold, Kid Cudi, Shygirl, Nathy Peluso, Arca, Laylow.

For her second EP, Twisted Basses in 2022, Crystal Murray confessed in an interview wishing to allow herself more artistic liberties, taking inspirations from more dry and energetic music genres like rock with Betty Davis as a source of inspiration.

For the release of Sad Lovers & Giants, Murray claims wishing to experiment further with her music by looking into her own hybridity and going beyond limits, blending genres together such as shoegaze and RnB.

== Discography ==
=== Album ===
Sad Lovers and Giants (LP)	To be released: May 31, 2024; Label: Because Music; Formats: LP, digital download

=== EP ===
I Was Wrong (EP)	Released: 2020; Label: Because Music; Formats: LP, CD, digital download
Twisted Bases (EP)	Released: 2022; Label: Because Music; Formats: LP, CD, digital download

=== Singles ===
==== As primary artist ====
- "Princess" (2018)
- "After Ten" (2019)
- "GGGB (Hotel Room Drama)" (2020)
- "August Knows" (2020)
- "Creeps" (Hotel Room Drama) [feat. Elheist] (2020)
- "Boss" (2021)
- "Like It Nasty" (2021)
- "Too Much to Taste" (2021)
- "Other Men" (2022)
- "EGO REMIX" (with Hook & Modulaw) (2023)
- "PAYBACK" (2024)
- "STARMANIAK" (2024)
- "Air" (2024)

==== As featured artist ====
- "Diamond Man" (Bamao Yendé ft Crystal Murray)
- “BODIES” (99GINGER, Tommy Gold, Crystal Murray) (2022)

== Performances ==
Crystal Murray has performed in several private events for brands, such as Swedish-based luxury brand Acne Studios.

In Avril 2020, she performed “Princess” on the French music program Taratata.

In June 2021, she performed the neo-soul track "Boss" on the German music performance platform COLORS.

In February 2022, Crystal Murray performed at Radio Nova's Chambre Noire.

On May 4, 2024, Crystal Murray announced a European Summer Tour, the "Sad Lovers N Giants Tour" comprising 12 dates, coinciding with the release of her latest album.

In November 2024, Crystal Murray performed at two shows in the UK supporting Lava La Rue at Bristol Strange Brew and London Bush Hall.
