= Gérard Natter =

French curler

- Curler

Team
- Curling club: Belfort CC

Curling career
- Member Association: France
- World Championship: 1 (1982)
Medal record
Curling
French Men's Championship
Gold medal – first place	1982

Gérard Natter is a French curler.

At the national level, he is a 1982 French men's champion curler.

He competed for Team France on 1982 World Men's Championship.

== Teams ==
Season	Skip	Third	Second	Lead	Coach	Events
1981–82	André Tronc (fourth)	Roger Jacobs	Bob Lehn	Gérard Natter (skip)	Pierre Catella	FMCC 1982 (gold); WCC 1982 (10th)
