= Rick Lang =

Canadian curler

- Curler
- Born: December 12, 1953 (age 72); Fort William, Ontario

Curling career
- Brier: 11 (1975, 1976, 1980, 1981, 1982, 1985, 1988, 1991, 1993, 1995, 2003)
- World Championship: 3 (1975, 1982, 1985)
Medal record
Representing Canada
World Curling Championships
Gold medal – first place	1982 Garmisch-Partenkirchen
Gold medal – first place	1985 Glasgow
Bronze medal – third place	1975 Perth
World Senior Curling Championships
Silver medal – second place	2007 Edmonton
Representing Northern Ontario
Labatt Brier
Gold medal – first place	1975 Fredericton
Gold medal – first place	1982 Brandon
Gold medal – first place	1985 Moncton
Silver medal – second place	1980 Calgary
Silver medal – second place	1981 Halifax
Bronze medal – third place	1993 Ottawa

Richard P. "Rick" Lang (born December 12, 1953) is a Canadian curler from Thunder Bay, Ontario. He is a two-time World champion and three-time Brier champion representing Northern Ontario. He currently serves as a performance consultant for Curling Canada.

== Playing career ==
Lang was runner up at the 1971 Canadian Junior Curling Championships as Doug Smith's team lead. He later played third with Brier champions Bill Tetley (1975), and Al Hackner (1982, 1985), winning two World championships with Hackner and a bronze medal at the Worlds with Tetley. He also skipped Northern Ontario to a gold medal at the 1981 Canadian Mixed Curling Championship. Lang later skipped Northern Ontario at the 1991 and 1993 Briers. He also played third on Al Hackner's Canadian Senior Men's championship team in 2006, and won a silver medal on the team at the 2007 World Senior Curling Championships. He later became a Head Coach for the Northern Ontario curling team on both the men's and women's side, appearing in both the 2020 Brier and Scotties Tournament of Hearts.

== Personal life ==
He is married to Lorraine Lang and has two children, Adam and Sarah. In February 2020, Lang survived a plane crash while returning home from the Scotties invitation with the team he had been coaching.
