= Al Hackner =

Canadian curler

- Curler
- Born: July 18, 1954 (age 72); Nipigon, Ontario

Team
- Curling club: Fort William CC; Thunder Bay, ON
- Skip: Al Hackner
- Third: Joe Scharf
- Second: Jamie Childs
- Lead: Gary Champagne

Curling career
- Member Association: Alberta (1976–1977); Northern Ontario (1979–present)
- Brier: 9 (1980, 1981, 1982, 1985, 1988, 1989, 1992, 1995, 2001)
- World Championship: 2 (1982, 1985)
Medal record
Representing Canada
Men's curling
World Championships
Gold medal – first place	1982 Garmisch-Partenkirchen	Team
Gold medal – first place	1985 Glasgow	Team
World Senior Championships
Silver medal – second place	2007 Edmonton	Team
Representing Northern Ontario
Labatt Brier
Gold medal – first place	1982 Brandon	Team
Gold medal – first place	1985 Moncton	Team
Silver medal – second place	1980 Calgary	Team
Silver medal – second place	1981 Halifax	Team

Allan A. Hackner (born July 18, 1954), nicknamed "the Iceman", is a retired Canadian Hall of Fame curler from Thunder Bay, Ontario. He was born in Nipigon, Ontario. He is a two-time Brier and World Champion skip. He is of Ojibwa descent and is a member of the Red Rock Indian Band. He is currently a member of USA Curling's High Performance Program Coaching staff.

== Career ==
Hackner has skipped the Northern Ontario team at nine Briers. He won the Brier in 1982 and again in 1985.

In 1982, he defeated Brent Giles of British Columbia to win his first Brier.

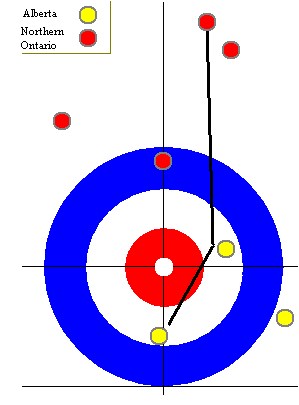
The "Hackner Double", one of the most difficult shots in curling. Hackner made this shot at the 1985 Labatt Brier final in order to tie the game, putting it into an extra end, in which his team stole, winning the game.

In 1985, he defeated Pat Ryan of Alberta to win his second Brier. To tie the game with last rock in the 10th end Hackner had to make a near impossible double-take out, coming around a guard to hit two stones some 6 feet apart, which would later go down in curling history as the "Al Hackner double". Hackner's team then stole a single point in the extra end for the win. The shot was named the greatest moment in Northern Ontario curling history by the Northern Ontario Curling Association.

In addition to playing for Northern Ontario, Hackner also represented Alberta at the 1977 Canadian Mixed Curling Championship, playing second for Don Sutton.

In 2004, Al Hackner was inducted into the Ontario Sports Hall of Fame.

Hackner won the 2006 Canadian Senior Curling Championships which he followed up with a silver medal at the World Senior Curling Championships in 2007.

In 2013, Hackner announced he would be playing in his final provincial championship, literally saying he was "too old for this shite". However that was a short lived retirement. He lost the men's provincial final to Brad Jacobs in 2015.

Hackner skipped Northern Ontario to the 2017 Canadian Masters Curling Championships. He won the event again in 2022.

Hackner was part of the staff for the Team USA women's team from 2012 to 2014, and rejoined to become the coach in 2017. He led the team to the 2018 Winter Olympics, where they finished eighth.

Following the 2022 Canadian Senior Curling Championships, Hackner announced he was retiring from competitive curling.

== Personal life ==
Hackner is a retired transportation conductor with CN Rail. He is married and has one son.
