= 2009 Canadian Direct Insurance BC Men's Curling Championship =

- Host city: Maple Ridge, British Columbia
- Arena: Golden Ears Winter Club
- Dates: February 9–15
- Winner: Team Geall
- Curling club: Royal City CC, New Westminster
- Skip: Sean Geall
- Third: Brent Pierce
- Second: Kevin Recksiedler
- Lead: Mark Olson
- Finalist: Jay Peachey

The 2009 Canadian Direct Insurance BC Men's Curling Championship, the provincial men's curling championship for British Columbia, was held February 9 to 15 at the Golden Ears Winter Club in Maple Ridge, British Columbia. The winning Sean Geall rink represented British Columbia at the 2009 Tim Hortons Brier in Calgary, Alberta.

== Teams ==
The teams are listed as follows:

Skip	Third	Second	Lead	Alternate	Club
Rick Folk	Brent Giles	Jamie Smith	Aron Herrick		Kelowna CC, Kelowna
Sean Geall	Brent Pierce	Kevin Recksiedler	Mark Olson		Royal City CC, New Westminster
Brian Windsor (Fourth)	Dennis Graber (Skip)	Kelly Row	Bill Johnson		Kamloops CC, Kamloops
Tyrel Griffith	Darren Nelson	Brad Wood	Darin Gerow		Vernon CC, Vernon
Greg McAulay	Ken Maskiewich	Deane Horning	Aaron Watson		Richmond CC, Richmond
Bryan Miki	Tyler Klitch	Jay Batch	Chad Hoffman	Terry Miller	Royal City CC, New Westminster
Jason Montgomery	Miles Craig	Gregg Danderfer	Will Duggan		Victoria CC, Victoria
Jay Peachey	Grant Dezura	Garry VanDenBerghe	Robbie Gallaugher	Kevin MacKenzie	Royal City CC, New Westminster
Jeff Richard	Tom Shypitka	Tyler Orme	Chris Anderson		Kelowna CC, Kelowna
Jim Cotter (Fourth)	Bob Ursel (Skip)	Kevin Folk	Rick Sawatsky		Kelowna CC, Kelowna

== Round robin standings ==
Final Round Robin Standings

Key
Teams to Playoffs
Teams to Tiebreaker

Skip	W	L	W–L	PF	PA	EW	EL	BE	SE
Sean Geall	7	2	–	58	43	35	30	7	9
Dennis Graber	6	3	1–0	58	45	36	33	11	7
Rick Folk	6	3	0–1	64	58	39	34	3	12
Jay Peachey	5	4	1–0	53	51	35	35	4	9
Jeff Richard	5	4	0–1	64	50	34	36	6	5
Bryan Miki	4	5	1–0	55	60	35	38	10	6
Bob Ursel	4	5	0–1	55	55	33	30	8	9
Jason Montgomery	3	6	1–0	52	63	35	36	5	10
Greg McAulay	3	6	0–1	51	54	38	36	13	12
Tyrel Griffith	2	7	–	28	59	24	38	4	3

== Round robin results ==
All draw times listed in Pacific Time (UTC−08:00).

=== Draw 1 ===
Monday, February 9, 12:00 pm

Sheet A	1	2	3	4	5	6	7	8	9	10	Final
Bob Ursel	0	0	4	0	0	0	2	0	2	0	8
Rick Folk	1	2	0	1	0	1	0	4	0	1	10

Sheet B	1	2	3	4	5	6	7	8	9	10	Final
Jay Peachey	0	2	0	1	0	1	1	0	2	X	7
Jeff Richard	1	0	1	0	1	0	0	2	0	X	5

Sheet C	1	2	3	4	5	6	7	8	9	10	Final
Bryan Miki	0	2	1	0	1	0	1	0	2	X	7
Tyrel Griffith	0	0	0	0	0	2	0	1	0	X	3

Sheet D	1	2	3	4	5	6	7	8	9	10	Final
Sean Geall	0	1	0	0	1	0	1	0	0	X	3
Dennis Graber	0	0	2	1	0	2	0	1	1	X	7

Sheet E	1	2	3	4	5	6	7	8	9	10	Final
Jason Montgomery	0	0	0	2	1	1	1	0	0	1	6
Greg McAulay	0	1	0	0	0	0	0	2	1	0	4

=== Draw 2 ===
Monday, February 9, 7:00 pm

Sheet A	1	2	3	4	5	6	7	8	9	10	Final
Sean Geall	0	2	0	0	1	2	0	1	0	2	8
Jay Peachey	0	0	1	1	0	0	1	0	2	0	5

Sheet B	1	2	3	4	5	6	7	8	9	10	Final
Bob Ursel	1	1	0	2	1	0	4	X	X	X	9
Tyrel Griffith	0	0	1	0	0	1	0	X	X	X	2

Sheet C	1	2	3	4	5	6	7	8	9	10	Final
Rick Folk	0	2	2	0	1	0	3	0	4	X	12
Jason Montgomery	2	0	0	1	0	1	0	2	0	X	6

Sheet D	1	2	3	4	5	6	7	8	9	10	11	Final
Bryan Miki	0	0	2	0	3	0	3	0	0	0	1	9
Greg McAulay	0	0	0	2	0	2	0	1	2	1	0	8

Sheet E	1	2	3	4	5	6	7	8	9	10	Final
Dennis Graber	0	0	1	0	2	1	0	0	1	0	5
Jeff Richard	1	2	0	2	0	0	1	0	0	1	7

=== Draw 3 ===
Tuesday, February 10, 12:00 pm

Sheet A	1	2	3	4	5	6	7	8	9	10	Final
Jeff Richard	0	0	0	2	0	2	2	0	0	0	6
Bryan Miki	0	1	0	0	2	0	0	0	1	1	5

Sheet B	1	2	3	4	5	6	7	8	9	10	11	Final
Jason Montgomery	0	0	1	0	0	2	0	0	1	1	0	5
Dennis Graber	0	1	0	2	0	0	1	1	0	0	1	6

Sheet C	1	2	3	4	5	6	7	8	9	10	Final
Greg McAulay	0	2	0	1	0	0	1	1	0	1	6
Bob Ursel	0	0	1	0	1	0	0	0	1	0	3

Sheet D	1	2	3	4	5	6	7	8	9	10	11	Final
Jay Peachey	0	0	1	0	2	0	2	0	0	2	0	7
Rick Folk	1	1	0	2	0	1	0	1	1	0	1	8

Sheet E	1	2	3	4	5	6	7	8	9	10	Final
Tyrel Griffith	0	0	1	0	0	0	0	X	X	X	1
Sean Geall	0	2	0	0	1	1	3	X	X	X	7

=== Draw 4 ===
Tuesday, February 10, 7:00 pm

Sheet A	1	2	3	4	5	6	7	8	9	10	Final
Jason Montgomery	0	2	1	0	0	0	3	0	0	X	6
Bob Ursel	2	0	0	2	1	1	0	2	1	X	9

Sheet B	1	2	3	4	5	6	7	8	9	10	Final
Bryan Miki	0	0	0	0	3	0	2	0	0	2	7
Jay Peachey	0	0	0	1	0	2	0	1	0	0	4

Sheet C	1	2	3	4	5	6	7	8	9	10	11	Final
Jeff Richard	0	2	0	0	3	0	1	0	0	2	0	8
Sean Geall	1	0	0	4	0	2	0	0	1	0	1	9

Sheet D	1	2	3	4	5	6	7	8	9	10	Final
Dennis Graber	0	1	0	0	0	1	0	0	3	X	5
Tyrel Griffith	0	0	1	0	0	0	1	0	0	X	2

Sheet E	1	2	3	4	5	6	7	8	9	10	Final
Greg McAulay	0	1	0	1	2	0	0	1	0	0	5
Rick Folk	1	0	1	0	0	1	2	0	1	1	7

=== Draw 5 ===
Wednesday, February 11, 12:00 pm

Sheet A	1	2	3	4	5	6	7	8	9	10	Final
Greg McAulay	0	0	0	2	2	1	0	1	1	X	7
Sean Geall	1	0	0	0	0	0	2	0	0	X	3

Sheet B	1	2	3	4	5	6	7	8	9	10	11	Final
Tyrel Griffith	0	0	1	0	0	2	0	1	1	0	1	6
Rick Folk	0	2	0	0	1	0	1	0	0	1	0	5

Sheet C	1	2	3	4	5	6	7	8	9	10	Final
Jay Peachey	0	1	1	2	1	0	1	0	1	X	7
Dennis Graber	2	0	0	0	0	1	0	1	0	X	4

Sheet D	1	2	3	4	5	6	7	8	9	10	Final
Jeff Richard	1	0	0	4	0	0	6	X	X	X	11
Bob Ursel	0	0	1	0	0	1	0	X	X	X	2

Sheet E	1	2	3	4	5	6	7	8	9	10	11	Final
Bryan Miki	0	0	2	0	2	1	0	1	0	2	0	8
Jason Montgomery	0	2	0	1	0	0	2	0	3	0	1	9

=== Draw 6 ===
Wednesday, February 11, 7:00 pm

Sheet A	1	2	3	4	5	6	7	8	9	10	11	Final
Bryan Miki	0	2	1	0	0	2	0	0	0	1	0	6
Dennis Graber	2	0	0	1	1	0	0	1	1	0	3	9

Sheet B	1	2	3	4	5	6	7	8	9	10	Final
Jeff Richard	0	2	0	0	1	0	0	2	0	0	5
Greg McAulay	0	0	0	0	0	2	1	0	2	1	6

Sheet C	1	2	3	4	5	6	7	8	9	10	Final
Sean Geall	0	1	0	0	1	2	0	4	X	X	8
Rick Folk	1	0	0	1	0	0	2	0	X	X	4

Sheet D	1	2	3	4	5	6	7	8	9	10	Final
Tyrel Griffith	0	0	0	0	1	0	X	X	X	X	1
Jason Montgomery	1	1	2	2	0	3	X	X	X	X	9

Sheet E	1	2	3	4	5	6	7	8	9	10	Final
Bob Ursel	2	0	0	4	0	1	0	1	X	X	8
Jay Peachey	0	2	0	0	1	0	0	0	X	X	3

=== Draw 7 ===
Thursday, February 12, 12:00 pm

Sheet A	1	2	3	4	5	6	7	8	9	10	Final
Tyrel Griffith	1	0	0	1	0	1	0	1	X	X	4
Jeff Richard	0	0	1	0	5	0	2	0	X	X	8

Sheet B	1	2	3	4	5	6	7	8	9	10	Final
Sean Geall	0	0	1	3	0	1	0	3	X	X	8
Jason Montgomery	0	0	0	0	1	0	2	0	X	X	3

Sheet C	1	2	3	4	5	6	7	8	9	10	Final
Bob Ursel	0	1	0	1	0	2	0	1	1	0	6
Bryan Miki	0	0	2	0	2	0	2	0	0	1	7

Sheet D	1	2	3	4	5	6	7	8	9	10	11	Final
Greg McAulay	0	1	0	0	1	0	0	1	0	2	0	5
Jay Peachey	0	0	1	0	0	1	0	0	3	0	2	7

Sheet E	1	2	3	4	5	6	7	8	9	10	Final
Rick Folk	0	0	0	2	0	0	X	X	X	X	2
Dennis Graber	0	0	4	0	4	2	X	X	X	X	10

=== Draw 8 ===
Thursday, February 12, 7:00 pm

Sheet A	1	2	3	4	5	6	7	8	9	10	Final
Jay Peachey	0	0	2	0	0	3	0	0	2	X	7
Jason Montgomery	0	1	0	1	0	0	1	0	0	X	3

Sheet B	1	2	3	4	5	6	7	8	9	10	Final
Dennis Graber	0	2	0	1	0	0	0	0	1	X	4
Bob Ursel	0	0	3	0	0	2	0	1	0	X	6

Sheet C	1	2	3	4	5	6	7	8	9	10	Final
Tyrel Griffith	0	0	0	2	1	0	1	0	1	1	6
Greg McAulay	0	0	1	0	0	1	0	1	0	0	3

Sheet D	1	2	3	4	5	6	7	8	9	10	Final
Rick Folk	0	2	0	2	0	2	0	0	0	1	7
Jeff Richard	1	0	0	0	1	0	1	1	2	0	6

Sheet E	1	2	3	4	5	6	7	8	9	10	Final
Sean Geall	3	0	0	1	0	1	0	1	0	X	6
Bryan Miki	0	0	1	0	1	0	1	0	1	X	4

=== Draw 9 ===
Friday, February 13, 9:00 am

Sheet A	1	2	3	4	5	6	7	8	9	10	11	Final
Dennis Graber	0	0	1	0	2	0	0	4	0	0	1	8
Greg McAulay	0	2	0	1	0	1	1	0	0	2	0	7

Sheet B	1	2	3	4	5	6	7	8	9	10	Final
Rick Folk	0	1	0	2	2	0	2	2	X	X	9
Bryan Miki	0	0	1	0	0	1	0	0	X	X	2

Sheet C	1	2	3	4	5	6	7	8	9	10	Final
Jason Montgomery	0	1	0	1	0	0	0	2	1	0	5
Jeff Richard	2	0	1	0	0	0	4	0	0	1	8

Sheet D	1	2	3	4	5	6	7	8	9	10	Final
Bob Ursel	0	0	0	0	1	3	0	0	0	X	4
Sean Geall	1	0	0	0	0	0	2	2	1	X	6

Sheet E	1	2	3	4	5	6	7	8	9	10	Final
Jay Peachey	1	0	1	0	0	1	1	1	1	X	6
Tyrel Griffith	0	1	0	2	0	0	0	0	0	X	3

== Tiebreaker ==
Friday, February 13, 2:30 pm

Sheet D	1	2	3	4	5	6	7	8	9	10	Final
Jay Peachey	2	0	3	0	0	1	0	2	1	X	9
Jeff Richard	0	1	0	2	0	0	1	0	0	X	4

== Playoffs ==
Page playoff system
1	Sean Geall	6
2	Dennis Graber	5
3	Rick Folk	4
4	Jay Peachey	7

Semifinal
2	Dennis Graber	7
4	Jay Peachey	8

Final
1	Sean Geall	8
4	Jay Peachey	7

=== 1 vs. 2 ===
Friday, February 13, 7:00 pm

Sheet D	1	2	3	4	5	6	7	8	9	10	Final
Sean Geall	0	1	0	2	2	0	0	0	0	1	6
Dennis Graber	0	0	4	0	0	1	0	0	0	0	5

=== 3 vs. 4 ===
Saturday, February 14, 1:00 pm

Team	1	2	3	4	5	6	7	8	9	10	Final
Jay Peachey	0	0	1	3	0	1	1	0	1	X	7
Rick Folk	0	1	0	0	1	0	0	2	0	X	4

=== Semi-final ===
Saturday, February 14, 8:00 pm

Team	1	2	3	4	5	6	7	8	9	10	11	Final
Dennis Graber	2	0	0	2	0	0	1	0	0	2	0	7
Jay Peachey	0	2	1	0	0	2	0	0	2	0	1	8

=== Final ===
Sunday, February 15, 4:00 pm

Team	1	2	3	4	5	6	7	8	9	10	11	Final
Jay Peachey	1	0	0	0	2	0	2	0	0	2	0	7
Sean Geall	0	1	0	1	0	2	0	2	1	0	1	8

2009 BC Men's Curling Championship

Sean Geall
1st British Columbia Provincial Championship title
