= 2010 Canadian Direct Insurance BC Men's Curling Championship =

- Host city: Vernon, British Columbia
- Arena: Vernon Curling Club
- Dates: February 1–7
- Winner: Jeff Richard
- Curling club: Kelowna CC, Kelowna, BC
- Skip: Jeff Richard
- Third: Tom Shypitka
- Second: Tyler Orme
- Lead: Chris Anderson
- Finalist: Sean Geall

The 2010 Canadian Direct Insurance BC Men's Curling Championship (British Columbia's men's provincial curling championship) was held February 1–7 at the Vernon Curling Club in Vernon, British Columbia. The winning Jeff Richard team represented British Columbia at the 2010 Tim Hortons Brier in Halifax, Nova Scotia.

The teams that advanced to compete in the championships competed in either a coastal or interior championships, as part of the British Columbia Men's Curling Championship. These competitions hosted 16 regionally qualified teams in the hopes that they would make it into the Canadian Direct Insurance BC Men's Curling Championship. Only 4 berths advance to the next competition.

The 2010 championship was hosted by Kal-Tire.

== Teams ==
Skip	Vice	Second	Lead	Club
Tom Buchy	Ken McHargue	Dave Toffolo	Darren Will	Kimberley Curling Club, Kimberley
Sean Geall	Brent Pierce	Kevin Recksiedler	Mark Olson	Royal City Curling Club, New Westminster
Bert Gretzinger	Bob Koffski	Brent Giles	Russell Koffski	Kelowna Curling Club, Kelowna
Greg McAulay	Ken Maskiewich	Dean Joanisse	Aaron Watson	Richmond Curling Club, Richmond
Jeff Richard	Tom Shypitka	Tyler Orme	Chris Anderson	Kelowna Curling Club, Kelowna
Fred Thomson	Don Freschi	Brendan Willis	Barry Marsh	Nelson Curling Club, Nelson
Jay Tuson	Ken Tucker	Glen Jackson	Colin Mantik	Victoria Curling Club, Victoria
Bob Ursel	Jim Cotter	Kevin Folk	Rick Sawatsky	Kelowna Curling Club, Kelowna
Steven Waatainen	Jeff Pilon	Keith Clarke	Ian Cook	Nanaimo Curling Club, Nanaimo
Paul Cseske	Derek Errington	Jay Wakefield (skip)	John Cullen	Royal City Curling Club, New Westminster

== Standings ==
Skip	W	L
Ursel	9	0
Geall	8	1
Richard	6	3
Gretzinger	5	4
Tuson	4	5
Wakefield	4	5
Thomson	3	6
Buchy	2	7
McAulay	2	7
Waatainen	2	7

== Scores ==
=== February 1 ===
- Geall 6-3 Richard
- Wakefield 6-4 Buchy
- Tuson 6-4 Thomson
- Gretzinger 8-6 Waatainen
- Ursel 5-2 McAulay
- Wakefield 8-5 Waatainen
- Geall 9-3 Thomson
- McAulay 9-7 Richard
- Ursel 8-3 Tuson
- Gretzinger 8-6 Buchy

=== February 2 ===
- Bushy 5-4 Tuson
- Gretzinger 11-5 McAulay
- Ursel 10-4 Geall
- Richard 6-5 Wakefield
- Thomson 8-6 Waatainen
- Geall 9-5 McAulay
- Wakefield 9-8 Tuson (11)
- Waatainen 11-6 Buchy
- Gretzinger 7-2 Thomson
- Ursel 7-4 Richard

=== February 3 ===
- Ursel 6-2 Waatainen
- Richard 9-1 Thomson
- Gretzinger 6-3 Wakefield
- Geall 10-8 Buchy (11)
- Tuson 7-5 McAulay
- Tuson 11-6 Gretzinger
- Ursel 8-1 Buchy
- Richard 7-6 Waatainen
- McAulay 8-7 Thomson
- Geall 11-3 Wakefield

=== February 4 ===
- Thomson 9-3 Buchy
- Waatainen 7-5 McAulay
- Geall 11-1 Tuson
- Richard 5-2 Gretzinger
- Wakefield 7-6 McAulay
- Geall 7-3 Gretzinger
- Ursel 9-3 Thomson
- Richard 8-2 Buchy
- Tuson 7-6 Waatainen

=== February 5 ===
- Ursel 7-4 Gretzinger
- Richard 9-6 Tuson
- Buchy 7-3 McAulay
- Geall 8-7 Waatainen
- Thomson 9-7 Wakefield

== Playoffs ==
Page playoff system
1	Bob Ursel	7
2	Sean Geall	8
3	Jeff Richard	5
4	Bert Gretzinger	3

Semifinal
1	Bob Ursel	6
3	Jeff Richard	8

Final
2	Sean Geall	8
3	Jeff Richard	9
