= Ron Steinhauer =

Canadian male curler

- Curler ♂

Team
- Curling club: Kelowna CC, Kelowna, BC

Curling career
- Member Association: British Columbia
- Brier: 3: (1993, 1994, 1995)
- World Championship: 1 (1994)
Medal record
Curling
Representing Canada
World Championships
Gold medal – first place	1994 Oberstdorf
Representing British Columbia
Tim Hortons Brier
Gold medal – first place	1994 Red Deer
Silver medal – second place	1993 Ottawa

Ronald Steinhauer is a Canadian curler.

He is a 1994 World Men's champion and a 1994 Labatt Brier champion.

== Awards ==
- British Columbia Sports Hall of Fame: inducted in 1995 with all of 1994 Rick Folk team, Canadian and World champions

== Teams ==
Season	Skip	Third	Second	Lead	Alternate	Events
1992–93	Rick Folk	Pat Ryan	Bert Gretzinger	Gerry Richard	Ron Steinhauer	Brier 1993 (silver)
1993–94	Rick Folk	Pat Ryan	Bert Gretzinger	Gerry Richard	Ron Steinhauer	Brier 1994 (gold); WCC 1994 (gold)
1994–95	Rick Folk	Pat Ryan	Bert Gretzinger	Gerry Richard	Ron Steinhauer	Brier 1995 (6th)
