= Gerry Richard =

Canadian male curler and coach

- Curler ♂
- Born: February 26, 1956 (age 70); Kelowna, British Columbia

Team
- Curling club: Kelowna CC, Kelowna, BC

Curling career
- Member Association: British Columbia
- Brier: 4: (1993, 1994, 1995, 2002)
- World Championship: 1 (1994)
Medal record
Curling
Representing Canada
World Championships
Gold medal – first place	1994 Oberstdorf
Representing British Columbia
Labatt Brier
Gold medal – first place	1994 Red Deer
Silver medal – second place	1993 Ottawa

Gerry P. Richard (born February 26, 1956) is a Canadian curler and curling coach from Kelowna, British Columbia.

He is a 1994 World Men's champion and a 1994 Labatt Brier champion.

== Awards ==
- British Columbia Sports Hall of Fame: inducted in 1995 with all of 1994 Rick Folk team, Canadian and World champions

== Teams ==
Season	Skip	Third	Second	Lead	Alternate	Coach	Events
1992–93	Rick Folk	Pat Ryan	Bert Gretzinger	Gerry Richard	Ron Steinhauer		Brier 1993 (silver)
1993–94	Rick Folk	Pat Ryan	Bert Gretzinger	Gerry Richard	Ron Steinhauer		Brier 1994 (gold); WCC 1994 (gold)
1994–95	Rick Folk	Pat Ryan	Bert Gretzinger	Gerry Richard	Ron Steinhauer		Brier 1995 (6th)
1996–97	Rick Folk	Bert Gretzinger	Gerry Richard	Dave Stephenson			
1999–00	Rick Folk	Jeff Richard	Tyler Orme	Gerry Richard			
2000–01	Rick Folk	Kevin Folk	Jeff Richard	Gerry Richard			
2001–02	Pat Ryan	Deane Horning	Kevin MacKenzie	Rob Koffski	Gerry Richard	Bill MacKenzie	Brier 2002 (6th)
2003–04	Rick Folk	Kevin Folk	Jeff Richard	Gerry Richard			
2004–05	Rick Folk	Kevin Folk	Jeff Richard	Gerry Richard			
2006–07	Grant Dezura (fourth)	Rick Folk (skip)	Jeff Richard	Gerry Richard			

== Record as a coach of national teams ==
Year	Tournament, event	National team	Place
2006	2006 World Women's Curling Championship	Canada (women)	3rd place, bronze medalist(s)
2007	2007 World Women's Curling Championship	Canada (women)	1st place, gold medalist(s)

== Personal life ==
Richard's children are known curlers as well. His daughter Jeanna Schraeder played third on the World and Canadian champion Kelly Scott rink. His son Jeff played in two Briers. He is formerly married to Kerrylyn Richard, and is currently married to Martina.
