= 2011 BDO Canadian Open of Curling (January) =

Grand Slam of Curling event

- Host city: Oshawa, Ontario
- Arena: General Motors Centre
- Dates: January 26–30
- Winner: (Manitoba) Mike McEwen
- Curling club: Assiniboine Memorial CC, Winnipeg, Manitoba
- Skip: Mike McEwen
- Third: B.J. Neufeld
- Second: Matt Wozniak
- Lead: Denni Neufeld
- Finalist: (Ontario) Glenn Howard

The 2011 BDO Canadian Open of Curling was held from January 26–30 at the General Motors Centre in Oshawa, Ontario. This event was the third men's Grand Slam event in the 2010-11 curling season. The purse for this event was CAD$100,000. 18 men's teams will be playing for eight quarterfinal spots in a round-robin competition.

The competition was marked by an interesting turn of events when the Thomas Ulsrud rink failed to win a game against Peter Corner. Team Ulsrud's loss created an eight-way tie in 2–3 win–loss records, prompting a draw shot challenge and the scheduling of two tiebreakers. Team Ulsrud, as well as Team Corner, Team Middaugh, and Team Higgs, failed to advance in the draw shot challenge, leaving Team Epping, Team Fowler, Team Bice and Team Walchuk to participate in the tiebreakers. If Thomas Ulsrud's rink had won the game against Peter Corner, there would be no tiebreakers. This marks the first time in Grand Slam history that a 2–3 win–loss record could qualify a team to a tiebreaker. The four remaining teams fought for the eighth qualifying spot, and Rob Fowler won the qualifying game.

Mike McEwen won his second Grand Slam of the season in an extra-end win over Glenn Howard in the final.

== Teams ==
Pool	Skip	Third	Second	Lead	Locale
Pool A	Peter Corner	Graeme McCarrel	Phil Lovenmark	Paul Madgett	Ontario
Pool A	John Epping	Scott Bailey	Darryl Prebble	Trevor Wall	(Ontario) Toronto
Pool A	Rob Fowler	Allan Lyburn	Richard Daneault	Derek Samagalski	(Manitoba) Brandon
Pool A	Kevin Martin	John Morris	Marc Kennedy	Ben Hebert	(Alberta) Edmonton
Pool A	Jeff Stoughton	Jon Mead	Reid Carruthers	Steve Gould	(Manitoba) Winnipeg
Pool A	Thomas Ulsrud	Torger Nergård	Christoffer Svae	Håvard Vad Petersson	(Norway) Oslo
Pool B	Mark Bice	Codey Maus	Steve Bice	John Grant	(Ontario) Tara
Pool B	Jim Cotter	Ken Maskiewich	Kevin Folk	Rick Sawatsky	(British Columbia) Kelowna
Pool B	Brad Gushue (fourth)	Randy Ferbey (skip)	Mark Nichols	Ryan Fry	(Newfoundland and Labrador) St. John's
Pool B	Glenn Howard	Richard Hart	Brent Laing	Craig Savill	(Ontario) Coldwater
Pool B	Pat Simmons	Steve Laycock	Brennen Jones	Dallan Muyres	(Saskatchewan) Regina
Pool B	Don Walchuk	Chris Schille	D. J. Kidby	Don Bartlett	(Alberta) Edmonton
Pool C	Brent Ross (fourth)	Jake Higgs (skip)	Andrew Clayton	Bill Buchanan	(Ontario) Harriston
Pool C	Mark Kean	Chris Van Huyse	Patrick Janssen	Tim March	(Ontario) Woodstock
Pool C	Kevin Koe	Blake MacDonald	Carter Rycroft	Nolan Thiessen	(Alberta) Edmonton
Pool C	Dale Matchett	Ryan Werenich	Jeff Gorda	Shawn Kaufman	(Ontario) Bradford
Pool C	Mike McEwen	B.J. Neufeld	Matt Wozniak	Denni Neufeld	(Manitoba) Winnipeg
Pool C	Wayne Middaugh	Joe Frans	Adam Spencer	Scott Foster	(Ontario) Toronto

== Round robin ==
=== Standings ===
Key
Teams to Playoffs
Teams to Tiebreakers (Note: Only four teams out of the eight teams with 2-3 records qualify for the tiebreakers because the other four teams were eliminated based on a draw shot distance score.)

Pool A	W	L	PF	PA
(Manitoba) Jeff Stoughton	4	1	27	19
(Alberta) Kevin Martin	3	2	29	22
(Ontario) John Epping	2	3	25	35
(Manitoba) Rob Fowler	2	3	23	25
(Norway) Thomas Ulsrud	2	3	24	23
(Ontario) Peter Corner	2	3	22	28

Pool B	W	L	PF	PA
(Ontario) Glenn Howard	5	0	36	12
(Saskatchewan) Pat Simmons	4	1	30	26
(Ontario) Mark Bice	2	3	25	30
(Alberta) Don Walchuk	2	3	28	28
(British Columbia) Jim Cotter	1	4	21	28
(Newfoundland and Labrador) Randy Ferbey	1	4	22	27

Pool C	W	L	PF	PA
(Manitoba) Mike McEwen	5	0	36	16
(Alberta) Kevin Koe	3	2	28	21
(Ontario) Dale Matchett	3	2	25	26
(Ontario) Jake Higgs	2	3	26	33
(Ontario) Wayne Middaugh	2	3	22	31
(Ontario) Mark Kean	0	5	24	34

=== Results ===
All times shown are in Eastern Standard Time.

==== Draw 1 ====
Wednesday, January 26, 7:30 pm

Sheet A	1	2	3	4	5	6	7	8	9	Final
(Alberta) Kevin Martin 🔨	0	1	0	2	0	2	0	1	0	6
(Ontario) John Epping	1	0	2	0	1	0	2	0	1	7

Sheet B	1	2	3	4	5	6	7	8	Final
(Saskatchewan) Pat Simmons	0	0	2	0	1	1	0	2	6
(Newfoundland and Labrador) Randy Ferbey 🔨	2	1	0	1	0	0	1	0	5

Sheet C	1	2	3	4	5	6	7	8	9	Final
(Norway) Thomas Ulsrud 🔨	0	0	0	1	0	0	1	2	2	6
(Manitoba) Rob Fowler	0	0	1	0	3	0	0	0	0	4

Sheet D	1	2	3	4	5	6	7	8	Final
(Alberta) Kevin Koe	2	0	1	1	0	1	0	1	6
(Ontario) Dale Matchett 🔨	0	2	0	0	0	0	1	0	3

Sheet E	1	2	3	4	5	6	7	8	Final
(Ontario) Glenn Howard 🔨	5	0	2	1	0	X	X	X	8
(Ontario) Mark Bice	0	0	0	0	2	X	X	X	2

==== Draw 2 ====
Thursday, January 27, 10:00 am

Sheet A	1	2	3	4	5	6	7	8	Final
(Ontario) Jake Higgs	0	0	0	2	0	2	0	3	7
(Ontario) Wayne Middaugh 🔨	0	1	0	0	2	0	2	0	5

Sheet B	1	2	3	4	5	6	7	8	Final
(British Columbia) Jim Cotter 🔨	1	0	0	0	2	0	0	X	3
(Alberta) Don Walchuk	0	1	3	1	0	1	1	X	7

Sheet C	1	2	3	4	5	6	7	8	9	Final
(Saskatchewan) Pat Simmons	2	0	0	2	0	1	0	0	1	6
(Ontario) Mark Bice 🔨	0	1	1	0	1	0	1	1	0	5

Sheet D	1	2	3	4	5	6	7	8	Final
(Manitoba) Jeff Stoughton 🔨	0	2	1	0	1	2	0	X	6
(Ontario) Peter Corner	0	0	0	1	0	0	1	X	2

Sheet E	1	2	3	4	5	6	7	8	Final
(Manitoba) Mike McEwen	1	0	0	0	3	0	2	X	6
(Ontario) Mark Kean 🔨	0	0	1	0	0	2	0	X	3

==== Draw 3 ====
Thursday, January 27, 1:30 pm

Sheet A	1	2	3	4	5	6	7	8	Final
(Ontario) Glenn Howard 🔨	1	0	1	0	3	1	X	X	6
(Newfoundland and Labrador) Randy Ferbey	0	1	0	1	0	0	X	X	2

Sheet B	1	2	3	4	5	6	7	8	Final
(Ontario) Wayne Middaugh	0	0	1	0	1	0	1	0	3
(Ontario) Dale Matchett 🔨	1	1	0	1	0	2	0	1	6

Sheet C	1	2	3	4	5	6	7	8	Final
(Alberta) Kevin Koe 🔨	1	2	1	0	0	2	2	X	8
(Ontario) Jake Higgs	0	0	0	1	1	0	0	X	2

Sheet D	1	2	3	4	5	6	7	8	Final
(Ontario) John Epping	0	2	0	0	1	0	X	X	3
(Norway) Thomas Ulsrud 🔨	3	0	0	4	0	1	X	X	8

Sheet E	1	2	3	4	5	6	7	8	9	Final
(Alberta) Kevin Martin 🔨	2	0	0	0	1	0	0	1	2	6
(Manitoba) Rob Fowler	0	2	1	0	0	1	0	0	0	4

==== Draw 4 ====
Thursday, January 27, 5:00 pm

Sheet A	1	2	3	4	5	6	7	8	Final
(Alberta) Don Walchuk 🔨	0	5	0	0	0	0	0	0	5
(Ontario) Mark Bice	0	0	2	1	1	1	1	3	9

Sheet B	1	2	3	4	5	6	7	8	Final
(Manitoba) Rob Fowler 🔨	1	0	1	0	0	1	0	X	3
(Manitoba) Jeff Stoughton	0	1	0	2	0	0	2	X	5

Sheet C	1	2	3	4	5	6	7	8	Final
(Manitoba) Mike McEwen	0	4	0	2	0	3	X	X	9
(Ontario) Dale Matchett 🔨	2	0	1	0	1	0	X	X	4

Sheet D	1	2	3	4	5	6	7	8	9	Final
(British Columbia) Jim Cotter	0	0	2	2	0	3	0	0	0	7
(Saskatchewan) Pat Simmons 🔨	0	2	0	0	1	0	2	2	1	8

Sheet E	1	2	3	4	5	6	7	8	Final
(Ontario) John Epping	0	0	1	1	0	3	1	0	6
(Ontario) Peter Corner 🔨	1	2	0	0	1	0	0	1	5

==== Draw 5 ====
Thursday, January 27, 8:30pm

Sheet A	1	2	3	4	5	6	7	8	Final
(Alberta) Kevin Koe	0	2	1	1	0	1	1	X	6
(Ontario) Mark Kean 🔨	2	0	0	0	1	0	0	X	3

Sheet B	1	2	3	4	5	6	7	8	Final
(Alberta) Kevin Martin 🔨	1	0	2	0	2	0	1	X	6
(Norway) Thomas Ulsrud	0	1	0	1	0	2	0	X	4

Sheet C	1	2	3	4	5	6	7	8	Final
(Alberta) Don Walchuk	0	1	0	1	0	0	X	X	2
(Ontario) Glenn Howard 🔨	2	0	3	0	1	3	X	X	9

Sheet D	1	2	3	4	5	6	7	8	Final
(Ontario) Wayne Middaugh	0	0	0	0	0	X	X	X	0
(Manitoba) Mike McEwen 🔨	0	0	0	4	3	X	X	X	7

Sheet E	1	2	3	4	5	6	7	8	Final
(British Columbia) Jim Cotter	1	0	1	0	4	0	X	X	6
(Newfoundland and Labrador) Randy Ferbey 🔨	0	1	0	1	0	1	X	X	3

==== Draw 6 ====
Friday, January 28, 10:00 am

Sheet A	1	2	3	4	5	6	7	8	Final
(Manitoba) Rob Fowler 🔨	2	0	1	1	1	1	0	0	6
(Ontario) Peter Corner	0	2	0	0	0	0	2	0	4

Sheet B	1	2	3	4	5	6	7	8	Final
(Ontario) Wayne Middaugh 🔨	1	0	2	1	0	3	0	1	8
(Ontario) Mark Kean	0	2	0	0	2	0	2	0	6

Sheet C	1	2	3	4	5	6	7	8	Final
(Manitoba) Jeff Stoughton 🔨	0	0	3	0	4	0	3	X	10
(Ontario) John Epping	1	0	0	2	0	2	0	X	5

Sheet D	1	2	3	4	5	6	7	8	Final
(Alberta) Don Walchuk	3	1	0	1	0	0	3	X	8
(Newfoundland and Labrador) Randy Ferbey 🔨	0	0	2	0	1	1	0	X	4

Sheet E	1	2	3	4	5	6	7	8	Final
(Ontario) Jake Higgs 🔨	0	1	1	0	1	0	0	0	3
(Ontario) Dale Matchett	1	0	0	1	0	2	0	2	6

==== Draw 7 ====
Friday, January 28, 1:30 pm

Sheet A	1	2	3	4	5	6	7	8	Final
(Ontario) Mark Bice	0	2	0	3	0	1	0	X	6
(Ontario) Jim Cotter 🔨	0	0	1	0	1	0	1	X	3

Sheet B	1	2	3	4	5	6	7	8	Final
(Manitoba) Mike McEwen 🔨	2	0	1	1	3	0	X	X	7
(Alberta) Kevin Koe	0	2	0	0	0	1	X	X	3

Sheet C	1	2	3	4	5	6	7	8	Final
(Alberta) Kevin Martin 🔨	0	2	0	1	0	0	1	1	5
(Ontario) Peter Corner	1	0	2	0	1	2	0	0	6

Sheet D	1	2	3	4	5	6	7	8	Final
(Ontario) Glenn Howard 🔨	2	0	2	0	0	1	1	0	6
(Saskatchewan) Pat Simmons	0	2	0	0	1	0	0	1	4

Sheet E	1	2	3	4	5	6	7	8	Final
(Manitoba) Jeff Stoughton	0	2	0	0	0	0	2	1	5
(Norway) Thomas Ulsrud 🔨	1	0	0	0	0	2	0	0	3

==== Draw 8 ====
Friday, January 28, 5:00 pm

Sheet A	1	2	3	4	5	6	7	8	Final
(Alberta) Don Walchuk 🔨	0	0	1	0	1	0	1	0	3
(Saskatchewan) Pat Simmons	0	0	0	1	0	2	0	3	6

Sheet B	1	2	3	4	5	6	7	8	Final
(Ontario) John Epping 🔨	0	2	0	1	0	1	0	X	4
(Manitoba) Rob Fowler	0	0	1	0	2	0	3	X	6

Sheet C	1	2	3	4	5	6	7	8	Final
(Newfoundland and Labrador) Randy Ferbey 🔨	2	1	1	2	0	2	X	X	8
(Ontario) Mark Bice	0	0	0	0	1	0	X	X	1

Sheet D	1	2	3	4	5	6	7	8	9	Final
(Ontario) Mark Kean 🔨	2	0	0	3	0	0	2	0	0	7
(Ontario) Jake Higgs	0	2	1	0	1	1	0	2	1	8

Sheet E	1	2	3	4	5	6	7	8	Final
(Ontario) Wayne Middaugh	0	1	1	0	0	2	0	2	6
(Alberta) Kevin Koe 🔨	1	0	0	3	0	0	1	0	5

==== Draw 9 ====
Friday, January 28, 8:30 pm

Sheet A	1	2	3	4	5	6	7	8	Final
(Ontario) Dale Matchett	0	2	1	1	0	2	0	0	6
(Ontario) Mark Kean 🔨	2	0	0	0	1	0	2	0	5

Sheet B	1	2	3	4	5	6	7	8	Final
(Norway) Thomas Ulsrud	0	0	1	0	0	2	0	0	3
(Ontario) Peter Corner 🔨	1	0	0	0	1	0	1	2	5

Sheet C	1	2	3	4	5	6	7	8	Final
(Ontario) Jake Higgs	0	2	1	0	1	0	1	1	6
(Manitoba) Mike McEwen 🔨	3	0	0	3	0	1	0	0	7

Sheet D	1	2	3	4	5	6	7	8	Final
(Alberta) Kevin Martin 🔨	1	2	3	0	0	X	X	X	6
(Manitoba) Jeff Stoughton	0	0	0	0	1	X	X	X	1

Sheet E	1	2	3	4	5	6	7	8	Final
(Ontario) Glenn Howard	1	0	3	0	3	X	X	X	7
(British Columbia) Jim Cotter 🔨	0	1	0	1	0	X	X	X	2

== Tiebreakers ==
Semifinals
1	(Ontario) John Epping	1
4	(Manitoba) Rob Fowler	3
3	(Ontario) Mark Bice	5
2	(Alberta) Don Walchuk	3

Qualifier to QF
(Manitoba) Rob Fowler	4
(Ontario) Mark Bice	2

=== Tiebreakers Draw ===
Saturday, January 29, 9:00

Team	1	2	3	4	5	6	7	8	Final
(Ontario) John Epping 🔨	0	0	0	1	0	X	X	X	1
(Manitoba) Rob Fowler	0	1	1	0	1	X	X	X	3

Team	1	2	3	4	5	6	7	8	Final
(Ontario) Mark Bice 🔨	0	2	2	0	1	X	X	X	5
(Alberta) Don Walchuk	1	0	0	2	0	X	X	X	3

=== Qualifier ===
Saturday, January 29, 11:30

Team	1	2	3	4	5	6	7	8	Final
(Manitoba) Rob Fowler	1	0	0	3	0	X	X	X	4
(Ontario) Mark Bice 🔨	0	0	1	0	1	X	X	X	2

== Playoffs ==
Quarterfinals; Saturday, 3:00 pm
(Ontario) Glenn Howard	5
(Manitoba) Rob Fowler	2
(Saskatchewan) Pat Simmons	1
(Alberta) Kevin Koe	8
(Manitoba) Mike McEwen	7
(Ontario) Dale Matchett	3
(Manitoba) Jeff Stoughton	5
(Alberta) Kevin Martin	3

Semifinals; Saturday, 7:00 pm
(Ontario) Glenn Howard	7
(Alberta) Kevin Koe	3
(Manitoba) Mike McEwen	6
(Manitoba) Jeff Stoughton	4

Finals; Sunday, 1:00 pm
(Ontario) Glenn Howard	4
(Manitoba) Mike McEwen	5

=== Quarterfinals ===
Saturday, January 29, 3:00 pm

Team	1	2	3	4	5	6	7	8	Final
(Ontario) Glenn Howard 🔨	2	0	0	0	0	3	0	X	5
(Manitoba) Rob Fowler	0	0	0	1	0	0	1	X	2

Team	1	2	3	4	5	6	7	8	Final
(Saskatchewan) Pat Simmons 🔨	0	0	1	0	0	0	X	X	1
(Alberta) Kevin Koe	1	4	0	1	1	1	X	X	8

Team	1	2	3	4	5	6	7	8	Final
(Manitoba) Mike McEwen 🔨	0	2	1	0	2	0	2	X	7
(Ontario) Dale Matchett	0	0	0	1	0	2	0	X	3

Team	1	2	3	4	5	6	7	8	Final
(Manitoba) Jeff Stoughton 🔨	2	0	0	0	0	0	3	0	5
(Alberta) Kevin Martin	0	0	0	1	1	0	0	1	3

=== Semifinals ===
Saturday, January 29, 7:00 pm

Sheet B	1	2	3	4	5	6	7	8	Final
(Ontario) Glenn Howard 🔨	2	0	2	0	1	0	2	X	7
(Alberta) Kevin Koe	0	1	0	1	0	1	0	X	3

Sheet D	1	2	3	4	5	6	7	8	Final
(Manitoba) Mike McEwen 🔨	0	0	2	0	0	1	0	3	6
(Manitoba) Jeff Stoughton	1	0	0	2	0	0	1	0	4

=== Final ===
Sunday, January 30, 1:00 pm

Sheet C	1	2	3	4	5	6	7	8	9	Final
(Manitoba) Mike McEwen 🔨	0	2	1	0	0	1	0	0	1	5
(Ontario) Glenn Howard	0	0	0	0	1	0	2	1	0	4
