= Bert Gretzinger =

Canadian curler

Bert M. Gretzinger (born April 7, 1951) is a Canadian curler. He was a member of the gold medal winning Canadian team at the 1994 World Men's Curling Championship.

He also won a bronze medal at the 2001 Canadian Olympic Curling Trials, where he lost to Kerry Burtnyk in the semifinal 7-5.

He was known for his ability to make big shots which overcame his inconsistency to some extent. He has played skip, third, and second at various points in his career.

== Awards ==
- British Columbia Sports Hall of Fame: inducted in 1995 with all of 1994 Rick Folk team, Canadian and World champions

== Teams ==
Season	Skip	Third	Second	Lead	Alternate	Events
1975–76	Bernie Sparkes	Bert Gretzinger	Al Cook	Keiven Bauer		Brier 1976 (bronze)
1988–89	Rick Folk	Bert Gretzinger	Rob Koffski	Doug Smith	Fred Trussell	Brier 1989 (silver)
1992–93	Rick Folk	Pat Ryan	Bert Gretzinger	Gerry Richard	Ron Steinhauer	Brier 1993 (silver)
1993–94	Rick Folk	Pat Ryan	Bert Gretzinger	Gerry Richard	Ron Steinhauer	Brier 1994 (gold); WCC 1994 (gold)
1994–95	Rick Folk	Pat Ryan	Bert Gretzinger	Gerry Richard	Ron Steinhauer	Brier 1995 (6th)
1996–97	Rick Folk	Bert Gretzinger	Gerry Richard	Dave Stephenson		
1998–99	Bert Gretzinger	Bob Ursel	Mark Whittle	Dave Mellof	David Stephenson	Brier 1999 (8th)
1999–00	Bert Gretzinger	Bob Ursel	Mark Whittle	Dave Mellof		
2000–01	Bert Gretzinger	Bob Ursel	Mark Whittle	Dave Mellof		
2001–02	Bert Gretzinger	Bob Ursel	Mark Whittle	Dave Mellof	Deane Horning	2001 COCT (bronze)
2005–06	Jim Cotter (fourth)	Pat Ryan (skip)	Kevin MacKenzie	Rick Sawatsky	Bert Gretzinger	2005 COCT (5th)
2005–06	Bert Gretzinger	Rob Koffski	Brent Giles	Doug Smith		2006 CSCC (4th)
2006–07	Bert Gretzinger	Kevin Folk	Mark Whittle	Dave Mellof		
2009–10	Bert Gretzinger	Bob Koffski	Brent Giles	Russell Koffski		2010 BC MCC (4th)
