= 1994 Labatt Brier =

- Host city: Red Deer, Alberta
- Arena: Centrium
- Dates: March 5–13
- Attendance: 130,625
- Winner: British Columbia
- Curling club: Kelowna CC, Kelowna
- Skip: Rick Folk
- Third: Pat Ryan
- Second: Bert Gretzinger
- Lead: Gerry Richard
- Alternate: Ron Steinhauer
- Finalist: Ontario (Russ Howard)

The 1994 Labatt Brier, Canada's national men's curling championship, was held from March 5 to 13 at the Centrium in Red Deer, Alberta.

In the final, former Brier champion Rick Folk of British Columbia, who won the Brier in 1980 representing Saskatchewan, defeated Russ Howard of Ontario to win his second Brier title, by a score of 8–5. The game was a re-match of the 1993 Labatt Brier, which saw Howard defeat Folk. In the game, the two teams traded singles in the first two ends. Ontario took a 2–1 lead in the third, after when B.C.'s third Bert Gretzinger missed his shots, leading to a steal of one for Ontario. However, B.C. rebounded with a three-ender in the fourth when Howard wrecked on a guard with his final shot, and Folk made an open draw to score three. In the fifth, Folk make a come-around raise to lie three on his last. Howard's final shot came up a bit short, giving up a steal of two. Ontario tried in vain to come back, scoring two in the sixth, but it was too little too late, with Folk eventually claiming victory. After the game, Howard called the Folk rink "uptight", as Folk did not engage with him for much of the game. There was also some controversy before the game, as the Folk rink chose to pick the same set of rocks that the Howard rink had already carefully chosen for their semifinal match, and had intended to use for the final. After finishing first in the round robin, Folk's team had the privilege of having first selection of rocks. Team Folk countered that the Howard team had broken a rule by selecting rocks of different colours (and changing their handles).

With the win, Folk became the first person to have won the Brier for two different provinces, and it was the longest time between two Brier victories (14 years) for a skip since Ab Gowanlock's 15 year gap between 1938 and 1953. It was the first Brier title for B.C. in 30 years. With the win, Folk and his rink would go on to represent Canada at the 1994 World Men's Curling Championship.

The 1994 Brier is remembered primarily for the antagonistic relationship between the mostly Albertan crowd and the Ontario team. This led it to be dubbed the "redneck brier" by some media commentators.

== Teams ==
Alberta	British Columbia	Manitoba
Glencoe CC, Calgary Skip: Ed Lukowich; Third: Fred Maxie; Second: Dan Petryk; Lead: Steve Petryk; Fifth: John Ferguson	Kelowna CC, Kelowna Skip: Rick Folk; Third: Pat Ryan; Second: Bert Gretzinger; Lead: Gerry Richard; Fifth: Ron Steinhauer	St. Vital CC, Winnipeg Skip: Dave Smith; Third: Peter Nicholls; Second: Scott Grant; Lead: Charlie Salina; Fifth: Dave Nicholls
New Brunswick	Newfoundland	Northern Ontario
Thistle-St. Andrews CC, Saint John Skip: Brian Dobson; Third: Charlie Sullivan Jr. Second: Andrew Buckle; Lead: Dan Philip; Fifth: Gary Dobson	St. John's CC, St. John's Skip: Mark Noseworthy; Third: Frank O'Driscoll; Second: Rob Thomas; Lead: Eugene Trickett; Fifth: Peter Hollett	Granite CC, North Bay Skip: Scott Patterson; Third: Phil Loevenmark; Second: John McClelland; Lead: Wayne Lowe; Fifth: Rob Abrams
Nova Scotia	Ontario	Prince Edward Island
Dartmouth CC, Dartmouth Skip: Alan O'Leary; Third: Jim Walsh; Second: Steve Johnston; Lead: Steve Piggott; Fifth: Stuart MacLean	Penetanguishene CC, Penetanguishene Skip: Russ Howard; Third: Glenn Howard; Second: Wayne Middaugh; Lead: Peter Corner; Fifth: Larry Merkley	Charlottetown CC, Charlottetown Skip: Mike Gaudet; Third: Eddie MacKenzie; Second: Tyler Harris; Lead: Craig Arsenault; Fifth: Daryell Nowlan
Quebec	Saskatchewan	Yukon/Northwest Territories
CC Amos, Amos Skip: Ghislain Doyon; Third: Jean-Yves Lemay; Second: Jean Maurice; Lead: Martin Gervais; Fifth: Serge Rocheleau	Quill Lake CC, Quill Lake Skip: Doug Harcourt; Third: Kevin Kalthoff; Second: Greg Harcourt; Lead: Brian Wempe; Fifth: Lyle Muyres	Atlin CC, Atlin Skip: Robert Andrews; Third: Clinton Abel; Second: Alfred Feldman; Lead: Wayne Lewis; Fifth: Gordon Moffatt

== Map of teams ==
Provincial Winners

== Round-robin standings ==
Key
Teams to Playoffs

Province	Skip	W	L
British Columbia	Rick Folk	10	1
Manitoba	Dave Smith	9	2
Ontario	Russ Howard	8	3
Northern Ontario	Scott Patterson	7	4
Newfoundland	Mark Noseworthy	7	4
Alberta	Ed Lukowich	5	6
New Brunswick	Brian Dobson	5	6
Quebec	Ghislain Doyon	5	6
Saskatchewan	Doug Harcourt	3	8
Nova Scotia	Alan O'Leary	3	8
Yukon/Northwest Territories	Robert Andrews	2	9
Prince Edward Island	Mike Gaudet	2	9

== Round-robin results ==
=== Draw 1 ===
Sheet A	1	2	3	4	5	6	7	8	9	10	Final
New Brunswick (Dobson) 🔨	1	0	0	1	0	0	1	1	1	X	5
Saskatchewan (Harcourt)	0	0	0	0	1	0	0	0	0	X	1

Sheet B	1	2	3	4	5	6	7	8	9	10	11	Final
Northern Ontario (Patterson) 🔨	0	0	0	0	0	1	1	1	0	1	0	4
Alberta (Lukowich)	0	0	1	0	1	0	0	0	2	0	1	5

Sheet C	1	2	3	4	5	6	7	8	9	10	Final
Newfoundland (Noseworthy) 🔨	1	0	1	0	2	0	0	2	0	X	6
Prince Edward Island (Gaudet)	0	1	0	0	0	1	0	0	1	X	3

Sheet D	1	2	3	4	5	6	7	8	9	10	Final
Manitoba (Smith) 🔨	1	1	0	1	0	0	0	2	2	X	7
Yukon/Northwest Territories (Andrews)	0	0	1	0	1	1	0	0	0	X	3

=== Draw 2 ===
Sheet B	1	2	3	4	5	6	7	8	9	10	Final
Quebec (Doyon) 🔨	1	0	0	0	2	0	0	1	0	X	4
Ontario (Howard)	0	2	1	0	0	2	2	0	1	X	8

Sheet C	1	2	3	4	5	6	7	8	9	10	Final
Nova Scotia (O'Leary) 🔨	0	0	1	0	0	0	0	0	X	X	1
British Columbia (Folk)	1	0	0	1	0	3	1	1	X	X	7

=== Draw 3 ===
Sheet A	1	2	3	4	5	6	7	8	9	10	Final
Alberta (Lukowich) 🔨	2	1	1	0	0	1	0	0	1	1	7
Prince Edward Island (Gaudet)	0	0	0	0	3	0	0	2	0	0	5

Sheet B	1	2	3	4	5	6	7	8	9	10	Final
Saskatchewan (Harcourt) 🔨	1	1	0	1	0	0	1	0	0	0	4
Quebec (Doyon)	0	0	2	0	0	1	0	0	0	2	5

Sheet C	1	2	3	4	5	6	7	8	9	10	Final
Northern Ontario (Patterson) 🔨	2	1	0	1	0	2	1	0	1	X	8
Newfoundland (Noseworthy)	0	0	2	0	1	0	0	1	0	X	4

Sheet D	1	2	3	4	5	6	7	8	9	10	Final
Manitoba (Smith) 🔨	0	2	0	0	1	0	0	3	1	X	7
New Brunswick (Dobson)	1	0	0	1	0	0	1	0	0	X	3

=== Draw 4 ===
Sheet A	1	2	3	4	5	6	7	8	9	10	Final
British Columbia (Folk) 🔨	0	2	0	0	1	0	3	0	1	X	7
Northern Ontario (Patterson)	0	0	0	0	0	1	0	1	0	X	2

Sheet B	1	2	3	4	5	6	7	8	9	10	Final
Prince Edward Island (Gaudet) 🔨	1	0	1	0	0	2	0	1	0	X	5
Yukon/Northwest Territories (Andrews)	0	1	0	0	5	0	0	0	1	X	7

Sheet C	1	2	3	4	5	6	7	8	9	10	Final
Ontario (Howard) 🔨	1	0	2	0	0	1	0	0	0	X	4
New Brunswick (Dobson)	0	1	0	0	1	0	0	1	0	X	3

Sheet D	1	2	3	4	5	6	7	8	9	10	Final
Nova Scotia (O'Leary) 🔨	1	0	0	1	1	1	0	1	1	X	6
Alberta (Lukowich)	0	0	1	0	0	0	1	0	0	X	2

=== Draw 5 ===
Sheet A	1	2	3	4	5	6	7	8	9	10	Final
New Brunswick (Dobson) 🔨	0	1	1	0	0	2	1	0	0	X	5
Alberta (Lukowich)	1	0	0	2	1	0	0	3	2	X	9

Sheet B	1	2	3	4	5	6	7	8	9	10	Final
Saskatchewan (Harcourt) 🔨	1	0	0	0	1	2	0	1	0	X	5
Northern Ontario (Patterson)	0	1	1	1	0	0	2	0	3	X	8

Sheet C	1	2	3	4	5	6	7	8	9	10	Final
Quebec (Doyon) 🔨	1	0	2	0	0	2	0	1	0	X	6
Newfoundland (Noseworthy)	0	4	0	1	1	0	1	0	3	X	10

Sheet D	1	2	3	4	5	6	7	8	9	10	Final
British Columbia (Folk) 🔨	0	0	1	0	0	1	3	0	0	0	5
Manitoba (Smith)	0	0	0	0	1	0	0	2	0	1	4

=== Draw 6 ===
Sheet A	1	2	3	4	5	6	7	8	9	10	Final
Yukon/Northwest Territories (Andrews) 🔨	0	1	1	0	0	0	2	0	0	0	4
British Columbia (Folk)	1	0	0	1	1	0	0	2	0	4	9

Sheet B	1	2	3	4	5	6	7	8	9	10	Final
Manitoba (Smith) 🔨	2	0	0	0	2	0	2	2	0	X	8
Nova Scotia (O'Leary)	0	1	0	1	0	2	0	0	0	X	4

Sheet C	1	2	3	4	5	6	7	8	9	10	Final
Ontario (Howard) 🔨	2	0	0	1	0	1	2	1	0	X	7
Prince Edward Island (Gaudet)	0	1	1	0	1	0	0	0	1	X	4

Sheet D	1	2	3	4	5	6	7	8	9	10	Final
Northern Ontario (Patterson) 🔨	1	1	0	0	0	0	3	0	1	X	6
New Brunswick (Dobson)	0	0	2	0	0	0	0	1	0	X	3

=== Draw 7 ===
Sheet A	1	2	3	4	5	6	7	8	9	10	Final
Newfoundland (Noseworthy) 🔨	1	0	2	0	0	0	0	X	X	X	3
Ontario (Howard)	0	2	0	2	2	1	4	X	X	X	11

Sheet B	1	2	3	4	5	6	7	8	9	10	11	Final
Alberta (Lukowich) 🔨	1	0	0	0	1	0	0	3	0	1	1	7
Saskatchewan (Harcourt)	0	0	1	2	0	1	1	0	1	0	0	6

Sheet C	1	2	3	4	5	6	7	8	9	10	Final
Nova Scotia (O'Leary) 🔨	0	1	3	0	1	1	0	1	0	X	7
Yukon/Northwest Territories (Andrews)	0	0	0	1	0	0	2	0	1	X	4

Sheet D	1	2	3	4	5	6	7	8	9	10	Final
Prince Edward Island (Gaudet) 🔨	0	1	0	0	1	0	3	1	0	0	6
Quebec (Doyon)	2	0	2	0	0	2	0	0	0	1	7

=== Draw 8 ===
Sheet A	1	2	3	4	5	6	7	8	9	10	Final
Prince Edward Island (Gaudet) 🔨	2	0	1	0	0	1	0	5	0	0	9
New Brunswick (Dobson)	0	2	0	0	1	0	1	0	2	2	8

Sheet B	1	2	3	4	5	6	7	8	9	10	Final
Yukon/Northwest Territories (Andrews) 🔨	0	0	1	0	1	0	1	0	1	X	4
Ontario (Howard)	0	1	0	2	0	1	0	3	0	X	7

Sheet C	1	2	3	4	5	6	7	8	9	10	Final
Quebec (Doyon) 🔨	0	1	1	1	0	1	0	3	0	X	7
Alberta (Lukowich)	0	0	0	0	3	0	1	0	0	X	4

Sheet D	1	2	3	4	5	6	7	8	9	10	Final
Newfoundland (Noseworthy) 🔨	1	0	2	0	2	1	0	1	0	1	8
Saskatchewan (Harcourt)	0	2	0	2	0	0	1	0	1	0	6

=== Draw 9 ===
Sheet A	1	2	3	4	5	6	7	8	9	10	11	Final
Alberta (Lukowich) 🔨	0	1	0	1	0	0	1	1	0	2	0	6
Manitoba (Smith)	0	0	1	0	1	1	0	0	3	0	1	7

Sheet B	1	2	3	4	5	6	7	8	9	10	Final
Northern Ontario (Patterson) 🔨	0	0	2	0	0	1	2	0	0	X	5
Yukon/Northwest Territories (Andrews)	0	0	0	1	0	0	0	1	0	X	2

Sheet C	1	2	3	4	5	6	7	8	9	10	Final
New Brunswick (Dobson) 🔨	0	0	1	0	2	0	1	0	1	X	5
British Columbia (Folk)	0	0	0	1	0	1	0	1	0	X	3

Sheet D	1	2	3	4	5	6	7	8	9	10	Final
Saskatchewan (Harcourt) 🔨	1	0	1	2	0	1	0	0	2	X	7
Nova Scotia (O'Leary)	0	3	0	0	1	0	0	1	0	X	5

=== Draw 10 ===
Sheet A	1	2	3	4	5	6	7	8	9	10	Final
Nova Scotia (O'Leary) 🔨	1	0	1	0	2	2	0	0	2	X	8
Newfoundland (Noseworthy)	0	1	0	3	0	0	3	4	0	X	11

Sheet B	1	2	3	4	5	6	7	8	9	10	Final
British Columbia (Folk) 🔨	1	0	2	3	0	0	2	0	2	X	10
Prince Edward Island (Gaudet)	0	2	0	0	1	0	0	2	0	X	5

Sheet C	1	2	3	4	5	6	7	8	9	10	Final
Manitoba (Smith) 🔨	0	2	0	0	0	2	1	0	3	X	8
Quebec (Doyon)	0	0	1	1	0	0	0	1	0	X	3

Sheet D	1	2	3	4	5	6	7	8	9	10	Final
Ontario (Howard) 🔨	2	0	0	2	0	1	1	0	0	2	8
Northern Ontario (Patterson)	0	1	1	0	2	0	0	0	1	0	5

=== Draw 11 ===
Sheet A	1	2	3	4	5	6	7	8	9	10	Final
Manitoba (Smith) 🔨	2	0	3	0	1	0	2	2	X	X	10
Northern Ontario (Patterson)	0	1	0	2	0	1	0	0	X	X	4

Sheet B	1	2	3	4	5	6	7	8	9	10	11	Final
Nova Scotia (O'Leary) 🔨	1	1	0	0	0	0	0	1	0	0	0	3
New Brunswick (Dobson)	0	0	0	0	1	0	0	0	1	1	1	4

Sheet C	1	2	3	4	5	6	7	8	9	10	Final
Yukon/Northwest Territories (Andrews) 🔨	2	0	3	0	1	0	1	0	1	X	8
Alberta (Lukowich)	0	1	0	1	0	1	0	1	0	X	4

Sheet D	1	2	3	4	5	6	7	8	9	10	Final
Saskatchewan (Harcourt) 🔨	1	1	0	0	0	2	0	1	0	X	5
Prince Edward Island (Gaudet)	0	0	0	2	2	0	1	0	3	X	8

=== Draw 12 ===
Sheet A	1	2	3	4	5	6	7	8	9	10	Final
Prince Edward Island (Gaudet) 🔨	2	0	2	0	1	0	0	1	0	X	6
Nova Scotia (O'Leary)	0	2	0	3	0	2	1	0	2	X	10

Sheet B	1	2	3	4	5	6	7	8	9	10	Final
Newfoundland (Noseworthy) 🔨	1	0	0	1	0	1	0	1	0	X	4
British Columbia (Folk)	0	1	1	0	2	0	2	0	0	X	6

Sheet C	1	2	3	4	5	6	7	8	9	10	Final
Alberta (Lukowich) 🔨	0	1	0	1	0	0	2	0	4	X	8
Ontario (Howard)	0	0	2	0	0	2	0	2	0	X	6

Sheet D	1	2	3	4	5	6	7	8	9	10	Final
Northern Ontario (Patterson) 🔨	2	0	2	0	2	0	X	X	X	X	6
Quebec (Doyon)	0	1	0	1	0	1	X	X	X	X	3

=== Draw 13 ===
Sheet A	1	2	3	4	5	6	7	8	9	10	Final
Quebec (Doyon) 🔨	3	0	1	0	1	0	0	1	0	X	6
Yukon/Northwest Territories (Andrews)	0	1	0	1	0	1	0	0	2	X	5

Sheet B	1	2	3	4	5	6	7	8	9	10	Final
New Brunswick (Dobson) 🔨	1	0	0	0	0	0	2	0	0	0	3
Newfoundland (Noseworthy)	0	0	0	1	0	0	0	1	1	1	4

Sheet C	1	2	3	4	5	6	7	8	9	10	Final
British Columbia (Folk) 🔨	1	2	0	1	0	2	0	2	0	0	8
Saskatchewan (Harcourt)	0	0	1	0	1	0	2	0	2	1	7

Sheet D	1	2	3	4	5	6	7	8	9	10	Final
Ontario (Howard) 🔨	0	2	1	2	1	2	X	X	X	X	8
Manitoba (Smith)	1	0	0	0	0	0	X	X	X	X	1

=== Draw 14 ===
Sheet A	1	2	3	4	5	6	7	8	9	10	11	Final
British Columbia (Folk) 🔨	0	1	0	1	0	2	0	1	0	0	1	6
Ontario (Howard)	1	0	1	0	1	0	1	0	0	1	0	5

Sheet B	1	2	3	4	5	6	7	8	9	10	Final
Manitoba (Smith) 🔨	2	2	0	2	0	0	1	0	1	X	8
Prince Edward Island (Gaudet)	0	0	1	0	1	1	0	2	0	X	5

Sheet C	1	2	3	4	5	6	7	8	9	10	11	Final
Northern Ontario (Patterson) 🔨	1	0	1	0	0	0	3	0	2	0	1	8
Nova Scotia (O'Leary)	0	1	0	1	1	2	0	1	0	1	0	7

Sheet D	1	2	3	4	5	6	7	8	9	10	Final
Yukon/Northwest Territories (Andrews) 🔨	0	2	0	0	0	2	0	0	0	0	4
Newfoundland (Noseworthy)	0	0	1	1	1	0	1	0	1	3	8

=== Draw 15 ===
Sheet A	1	2	3	4	5	6	7	8	9	10	Final
Nova Scotia (O'Leary) 🔨	0	1	0	0	1	0	0	2	0	1	5
Quebec (Doyon)	1	0	0	1	0	2	1	0	1	0	6

Sheet B	1	2	3	4	5	6	7	8	9	10	Final
Ontario (Howard) 🔨	2	0	1	0	0	2	0	0	0	0	5
Saskatchewan (Harcourt)	0	2	0	0	2	0	1	0	0	1	6

Sheet C	1	2	3	4	5	6	7	8	9	10	Final
New Brunswick (Dobson) 🔨	2	0	3	0	2	0	0	0	0	2	9
Yukon/Northwest Territories (Andrews)	0	1	0	4	0	0	0	1	0	0	6

Sheet D	1	2	3	4	5	6	7	8	9	10	Final
Newfoundland (Noseworthy) 🔨	2	2	0	2	0	2	0	2	X	X	10
Alberta (Lukowich)	0	0	1	0	1	0	1	0	X	X	3

=== Draw 16 ===
Sheet A	1	2	3	4	5	6	7	8	9	10	Final
Quebec (Doyon) 🔨	1	0	0	0	0	1	1	0	0	0	3
New Brunswick (Dobson)	0	1	0	0	0	0	0	2	0	1	4

Sheet B	1	2	3	4	5	6	7	8	9	10	11	Final
Alberta (Lukowich) 🔨	0	2	0	0	1	0	0	1	0	2	0	6
British Columbia (Folk)	0	0	0	3	0	1	1	0	1	0	1	7

Sheet C	1	2	3	4	5	6	7	8	9	10	Final
Saskatchewan (Harcourt) 🔨	2	0	0	1	0	2	0	1	0	X	6
Manitoba (Smith)	0	0	2	0	3	0	2	0	2	X	9

Sheet D	1	2	3	4	5	6	7	8	9	10	Final
Prince Edward Island (Gaudet) 🔨	1	0	2	0	2	0	2	1	0	0	8
Northern Ontario (Patterson)	0	2	0	3	0	1	0	0	2	1	9

=== Draw 17 ===
Sheet A	1	2	3	4	5	6	7	8	9	10	Final
Yukon/Northwest Territories (Andrews) 🔨	0	0	0	1	0	0	0	0	X	X	1
Saskatchewan (Harcourt)	2	1	1	0	2	1	1	1	X	X	9

Sheet B	1	2	3	4	5	6	7	8	9	10	Final
Newfoundland (Noseworthy) 🔨	0	0	0	1	0	2	0	1	1	X	5
Manitoba (Smith)	0	1	2	0	3	0	1	0	0	X	7

Sheet C	1	2	3	4	5	6	7	8	9	10	Final
Ontario (Howard) 🔨	1	0	2	0	3	1	2	0	2	X	11
Nova Scotia (O'Leary)	0	1	0	3	0	0	0	2	0	X	6

Sheet D	1	2	3	4	5	6	7	8	9	10	Final
Quebec (Doyon) 🔨	0	2	0	0	0	0	1	0	0	X	3
British Columbia (Folk)	1	0	0	1	0	1	0	4	2	X	9

== Playoffs ==
Semifinal			Final
			1	British Columbia	8
2	Manitoba	3	3	Ontario	5
3	Ontario	6

=== Semifinal ===
Sheet C	1	2	3	4	5	6	7	8	9	10	Final
Manitoba (Smith) 🔨	0	0	0	0	1	0	2	0	0	X	3
Ontario (Howard)	0	1	0	0	0	2	0	2	1	X	6

Player percentages
Manitoba		Ontario	
Charlie Salina	88%	Peter Corner	94%
Scott Grant	75%	Wayne Middaugh	94%
Peter Nicholls	91%	Glenn Howard	80%
Dave Smith	79%	Russ Howard	91%
Total	83%	Total	90%

=== Final ===
Sheet C	1	2	3	4	5	6	7	8	9	10	Final
British Columbia (Folk) 🔨	1	0	0	3	2	0	1	0	1	X	8
Ontario (Howard)	0	1	1	0	0	2	0	1	0	X	5

Player percentages
British Columbia		Ontario	
Gerry Richard	86%	Peter Corner	95%
Bert Gretzinger	81%	Wayne Middaugh	95%
Pat Ryan	86%	Glenn Howard	88%
Rick Folk	87%	Russ Howard	79%
Total	85%	Total	89%

== Statistics ==
=== Top 5 player percentages ===
Round Robin only

Leads	%
(Ontario) Peter Corner	88
(British Columbia) Gerry Richard	85
(Alberta) Steve Petryk	82
(Newfoundland and Labrador) Eugene Trickett	82
(Saskatchewan) Brian Wempe	82

Seconds	%
(Ontario) Wayne Middaugh	84
(British Columbia) Bert Gretzinger	82
(Manitoba) Scott Grant	80
(Alberta) Dan Petryk	80
(New Brunswick) Andrew Buckle	78

Thirds	%
(British Columbia) Pat Ryan	82
(Ontario) Glenn Howard	81
(Manitoba) Peter Nicholls	81
(Saskatchewan) Kevin Kalthoff	77
(New Brunswick) Charlie Sullivan Jr.	77

Skips	%
(Ontario) Russ Howard	85
(British Columbia) Rick Folk	81
(Manitoba) Dave Smith	78
(New Brunswick) Brian Dobson	76
(Newfoundland and Labrador) Mark Noseworthy	75

=== Team percentages ===
Round Robin only

Province	Skip	%
Ontario	Russ Howard	85
British Columbia	Rick Folk	82
Manitoba	Dave Smith	79
New Brunswick	Brian Dobson	78
Saskatchewan	Doug Harcourt	76
Northern Ontario	Scott Patterson	76
Newfoundland	Mark Noseworthy	75
Alberta	Ed Lukowich	75
Quebec	Ghislain Doyon	74
Nova Scotia	Alan O'Leary	73
Yukon/Northwest Territories	Robert Andrews	70
Prince Edward Island	Mike Gaudet	67
