= 2007 Canadian Senior Curling Championships =

- Host city: Trois-Rivières, Quebec
- Arena: Colisée de Trois-Rivières
- Dates: March 18–25
- Men's winner: Alberta
- Skip: Pat Ryan
- Third: Marv Wirth
- Second: Ken McLean
- Lead: Millard Evans
- Finalist: Ontario
- Women's winner: Alberta
- Skip: Diane Foster
- Third: Shirley McPherson
- Second: Chris Wilson
- Lead: Shirley Kohuch
- Finalist: British Columbia

The 2007 Canadian Senior Curling Championships were held March 18–25 at the Colisée de Trois-Rivières in Trois-Rivières, Quebec.

Alberta won both the men's and women's events. In the men's final, Edmonton's Pat Ryan rink defeated Ontario's Bob Turcotte, while on the women's side, Lethbridge's Diane Foster team beat British Columbia's Kathy Smiley. The winning teams represented Canada at the 2008 World Senior Curling Championships.

== Men's standings ==
Locale	Skip	W	L
Alberta	Pat Ryan	9	2
British Columbia	Rick Folk	8	3
Ontario	Bob Turcotte	8	3
Nova Scotia	Brian Rafuse	7	4
Manitoba	Lionel Walz	6	5
New Brunswick	Robert MacDiarmid	5	6
Saskatchewan	Bill Weppler	5	6
Prince Edward Island	Mel Bernard	5	6
Newfoundland and Labrador	Bas Buckle	4	7
Quebec	John Stewart	4	7
Yukon/Northwest Territories	George Hilderman	3	8
Northern Ontario	Bud O'Donnell	2	9

=== Playoffs ===
Semi final		Final
British Columbia	5
Ontario	6	Alberta	8
		Ontario	5

== Women's standings ==
Locale	Skip	W	L
Alberta	Diane Foster	9	2
British Columbia	Kathy Smiley	9	2
Saskatchewan	Debbie Thierman	8	3
Nova Scotia	Penny LaRocque	8	3
Manitoba	Joyce McDougall	7	4
Ontario	Jan Carwardine	7	4
Northern Ontario	Vickey Barrett	5	6
Newfoundland and Labrador	Barb Pinsent	4	7
New Brunswick	Sharon Levesque	4	7
Northwest Territories/Yukon	Wendy Ondrack	3	8
Quebec	Sylvye Turgeon	2	9
Prince Edward Island	Diane MacKay	0	11

=== Tie breaker ===
- Saskatchewan 7-6 Nova Scotia

=== Playoffs ===
Semi final		Final
British Columbia	7
Saskatchewan	5	Alberta	5
		British Columbia	4
