= 1984 Canadian Junior Men's Curling Championship =

- Host city: Winnipeg, Manitoba
- Arena: Assiniboine Memorial Curling Club
- Dates: February 19–25
- Winner: Manitoba
- Skip: Bob Ursel
- Third: Brent Mendella
- Second: Gerald Chick
- Lead: Mike Ursel
- Finalist: British Columbia (Rob Houston)

The 1984 Pepsi Canadian Junior Men's Curling Championship was held February 19 to 25, 1984 at the Assiniboine Memorial Curling Club in Winnipeg, Manitoba. The host Manitoba team, skipped by Bob Ursel (of Winnipeg) won the event, defeating British Columbia (skipped by Rob Houston) in the finals. For winning the event, Ursel and his team of Brent Mendella, Gerald Chick and brother Mike Ursel earned a spot representing Canada at the 1985 World Junior Curling Championships, where they won a gold medal.

== Round robin standings ==
Final standings

Key
Teams to Playoffs

Team	Skip	Locale	W	L
British Columbia	Rob Houston	Vernon	10	1
Manitoba	Bob Ursel	Winnipeg	9	2
Saskatchewan	Jamie Schneider	Kronau	8	3
Ontario	Steve Hartley	Thornhill	7	4
Alberta	Kevin Park	Edmonton	6	5
Quebec	Jean-Pierre Croteau	Gatineau	5	6
Nova Scotia	Danny Bentley	Truro	5	6
Newfoundland	Frank O'Driscoll	St. John's	5	6
Northern Ontario	Rob Shalla	Copper Cliff	4	7
Prince Edward Island	Alan Brown	Charlottetown	3	8
New Brunswick	Andrew Buckle	Saint John	2	9
Northwest Territories / Yukon	Derek Elkin	Yellowknife	2	9

== Playoffs ==
Semifinal			Final
			1	British Columbia	4
2	Manitoba	7	2	Manitoba	7
3	Saskatchewan	6

=== Semifinal ===
February 24, 1984

Team	1	2	3	4	5	6	7	8	9	10	11	Final
Manitoba (Ursel)	1	0	0	2	0	2	1	0	0	0	1	7
Saskatchewan (Schneider)	0	0	1	0	2	0	0	1	1	1	0	6

=== Final ===
Team	1	2	3	4	5	6	7	8	9	10	Final
British Columbia (Houston)	0	0	0	2	0	1	0	1	0	0	4
Manitoba (Ursel)	2	0	0	0	1	0	2	0	0	2	7
