= 2000 Ontario Nokia Cup =

Canadian regional curling championship

- Host city: Nepean, Ontario
- Arena: Nepean Sportsplex
- Dates: February 7-13
- Winner: Team Corner
- Curling club: Glendale Golf & Country Club, Hamilton, Ontario
- Skip: Peter Corner
- Third: Todd Brandwood
- Second: Drew Macklin
- Lead: Dwayne Pyper
- Finalist: Wayne Middaugh

The 2000 Nokia Cup, southern Ontario men's provincial curling championship was held February 7-13 at the Steve Yzerman Arena at the Nepean Sportsplex in Nepean, Ontario. The winning rink of Peter Corner, Todd Brandwood, Drew Macklin and Dwayne Pyper from Hamilton would go on to represent Ontario at the 2000 Labatt Brier in Saskatoon.

In the final, Peter Corner and his Hamilton rink defeated his cousin and former teammate, Wayne Middaugh's Toronto rink, 6–4. The game began on a bad note for Middaugh who was heavy on his draw attempt in the first end, giving up a steal of one to Corner. Middaugh gave up another steal in the eighth end after coming up light on a draw, to go down 5–3. The teams traded singles in the next two ends for a 6 to 4 final score.

Corner's new rink of Todd Brandwood, Drew Macklin and Dwayne Pyper had played in just eight games before playdowns that season. It marked Corner's fifth trip to the Brier, but the first as a skip. The four previous times had been playing lead for Team Russ Howard which also included Middaugh at second.

== Teams ==
Skip	Third	Second	Lead	Club
Kevin Breivik	Jim Lyle	Wayne Tuck Jr.	Ted Smith	St. Thomas Curling Club, St. Thomas
Bryan Cochrane	Bill Gamble	Ian MacAulay	Mike Pastuch	RCMP Curling Club, Ottawa
Peter Corner	Todd Brandwood	Drew Macklin	Dwayne Pyper	Glendale Golf & Country Club, Hamilton
Mike Harris	Richard Hart	Collin Mitchell	George Karrys	Tam Heather Country Club, Scarborough
Jeff McCrady	Jim Hunker	Morgan Currie	Mike Stachon	Rideau Curling Club, Ottawa
Peter Mellor	Jeff Thompson	James Bromiley	Brian Scott	Chesley Curling Club, Chesley
Wayne Middaugh	Graeme McCarrel	Ian Tetley	Scott Bailey	St. George's Golf and Country Club, Etobicoke
Rich Moffatt	Howard Rajala	Chris Fulton	Paul Madden	Rideau Curling Club, Ottawa
Rob Rumfeldt	Greg Robinson	Jeff Robinson	Nolan Sims	Guelph Curling Club, Guelph
Kirk Ziola	Peter Van Ymeren	Darcy Tomchick	Terry Van Ymeren	Highland Country Club, London

== Standings ==
Key
Teams to Playoffs

Skip	Wins	Losses
Wayne Middaugh	8	1
Kirk Ziola	7	2
Peter Corner	7	2
Jeff McCrady	6	3
Rich Moffatt	6	3
Bryan Cochrane	3	6
Mike Harris	3	6
Rob Rumfeldt	3	6
Peter Mellor	2	7
Kevin Breivik	0	9

== Round-robin results ==
=== Draw 1 ===
February 7

Team	1	2	3	4	5	6	7	8	9	10	Final
Bryan Cochrane	0	0	0	1	0	0	1	0	0	X	2
Jeff McCrady	0	0	3	0	0	0	0	2	2	X	7

Team	1	2	3	4	5	6	7	8	9	10	Final
Peter Mellor	0	1	0	1	0	0	0	0	1	X	3
Peter Corner	1	0	1	0	1	0	1	4	0	X	8

Team	1	2	3	4	5	6	7	8	9	10	Final
Rich Moffatt	0	1	0	4	1	0	1	0	2	X	9
Mike Harris	0	0	1	0	0	3	0	1	0	X	5

Team	1	2	3	4	5	6	7	8	9	10	Final
Wayne Middaugh	1	0	0	2	1	0	0	4	1	X	9
Kevin Breivik	0	1	1	0	0	0	2	0	0	X	4

Team	1	2	3	4	5	6	7	8	9	10	Final
Rob Rumfeldt	1	0	0	0	0	2	0	3	0	X	6
Kirk Ziola	0	2	3	1	1	0	1	0	1	X	9

=== Draw 2 ===
February 8

Team	1	2	3	4	5	6	7	8	9	10	Final
Peter Mellor	2	2	0	1	0	2	1	0	X	X	8
Rob Rumfeldt	0	0	2	0	1	0	0	1	X	X	4

Team	1	2	3	4	5	6	7	8	9	10	Final
Jeff McCrady	1	0	2	0	2	0	0	1	0	X	6
Mike Harris	0	1	0	1	0	0	1	0	0	X	3

Team	1	2	3	4	5	6	7	8	9	10	Final
Bryan Cochrane	1	0	0	4	0	2	2	0	2	X	11
Kevin Breivik	0	0	2	0	1	0	0	2	0	X	5

Team	1	2	3	4	5	6	7	8	9	10	Final
Peter Corner	0	1	0	1	0	0	1	0	1	X	4
Kirk Ziola	1	0	1	0	2	1	0	1	0	X	6

Team	1	2	3	4	5	6	7	8	9	10	Final
Rich Moffatt	0	2	0	0	1	1	1	0	2	0	7
Wayne Middaugh	1	0	4	1	0	0	0	1	0	1	8

=== Draw 3 ===
February 8

Team	1	2	3	4	5	6	7	8	9	10	Final
Rich Moffatt	1	0	0	1	0	2	0	1	0	X	5
Peter Corner	0	1	2	0	1	0	2	0	2	X	8

Team	1	2	3	4	5	6	7	8	9	10	Final
Kevin Breivik	1	0	2	0	0	1	1	0	1	X	6
Kirk Ziola	0	3	0	2	1	0	0	2	0	X	8

Team	1	2	3	4	5	6	7	8	9	10	Final
Wayne Middaugh	5	1	0	0	0	2	X	X	X	X	8
Jeff McCrady	0	0	0	2	0	0	X	X	X	X	2

Team	1	2	3	4	5	6	7	8	9	10	11	Final
Rob Rumfeldt	1	0	0	1	0	2	0	1	0	1	0	6
Mike Harris	0	0	2	0	3	0	1	0	0	0	1	7

Team	1	2	3	4	5	6	7	8	9	10	Final
Peter Mellor	1	0	3	0	1	0	0	1	0	X	6
Bryan Cochrane	0	2	0	3	0	2	1	0	0	X	8

=== Draw 4 ===
February 9

Team	1	2	3	4	5	6	7	8	9	10	Final
Jeff McCrady	1	0	0	0	1	0	1	1	0	2	6
Kevin Breivik	0	1	2	0	0	1	0	0	1	0	5

Team	1	2	3	4	5	6	7	8	9	10	Final
Rich Moffatt	0	0	4	0	2	2	X	X	X	X	8
Peter Mellor	0	1	0	1	0	0	X	X	X	X	2

Team	1	2	3	4	5	6	7	8	9	10	Final
Peter Corner	3	0	2	0	2	0	1	2	X	X	10
Rob Rumfeldt	0	0	0	2	0	1	0	0	X	X	3

Team	1	2	3	4	5	6	7	8	9	10	Final
Bryan Cochrane	1	0	1	0	0	0	0	0	2	X	4
Wayne Middaugh	0	1	0	0	3	0	1	2	0	X	7

Team	1	2	3	4	5	6	7	8	9	10	Final
Kirk Ziola	0	1	0	1	0	1	0	1	2	1	7
Mike Harris	0	0	1	0	2	0	3	0	0	0	6

=== Draw 5 ===
February 9

Team	1	2	3	4	5	6	7	8	9	10	Final
Mike Harris	0	0	0	0	0	2	0	3	0	0	5
Bryan Cochrane	0	1	0	0	2	0	1	0	0	2	6

Team	1	2	3	4	5	6	7	8	9	10	Final
Wayne Middaugh	2	1	0	1	2	1	3	X	X	X	10
Rob Rumfeldt	0	0	1	0	0	0	0	X	X	X	1

Team	1	2	3	4	5	6	7	8	9	10	Final
Peter Mellor	1	0	2	0	0	0	3	0	0	X	6
Kirk Ziola	0	1	0	3	0	1	0	2	1	X	8

Team	1	2	3	4	5	6	7	8	9	10	Final
Jeff McCrady	1	1	0	0	1	0	2	0	0	1	6
Peter Corner	0	0	2	1	0	1	0	1	0	0	5

Team	1	2	3	4	5	6	7	8	9	10	Final
Kevin Breivik	1	0	2	0	0	2	0	0	1	0	6
Rich Moffatt	0	4	0	2	1	0	0	1	0	1	9

=== Draw 6 ===
February 10

Team	1	2	3	4	5	6	7	8	9	10	11	Final
Wayne Middaugh	1	0	1	1	0	0	0	0	0	1	1	5
Kirk Ziola	0	0	0	0	0	3	1	0	0	0	0	4

Team	1	2	3	4	5	6	7	8	9	10	Final
Bryan Cochrane	0	1	0	1	0	1	0	2	0	X	5
Rich Moffatt	0	0	1	0	3	0	2	0	2	X	8

Team	1	2	3	4	5	6	7	8	9	10	Final
Kevin Breivik	1	0	1	0	0	1	0	0	0	X	3
Peter Corner	0	1	0	1	3	0	0	1	0	X	6

Team	1	2	3	4	5	6	7	8	9	10	Final
Mike Harris	2	0	1	0	5	0	3	X	X	X	11
Peter Mellor	0	2	0	2	0	1	0	X	X	X	5

Team	1	2	3	4	5	6	7	8	9	10	Final
Rob Rumfeldt	2	0	3	0	1	0	1	0	3	X	10
Jeff McCrady	0	1	0	2	0	1	0	2	0	X	6

=== Draw 7 ===
February 10

Team	1	2	3	4	5	6	7	8	9	10	11	Final
Kevin Breivik	0	0	0	1	0	2	0	2	0	1	0	6
Peter Mellor	1	1	1	0	1	0	1	0	1	0	1	7

Team	1	2	3	4	5	6	7	8	9	10	Final
Kirk Ziola	1	1	0	0	1	0	2	1	0	1	7
Jeff McCrady	0	0	2	2	0	1	0	0	1	0	6

Team	1	2	3	4	5	6	7	8	9	10	Final
Mike Harris	2	2	0	1	0	2	0	1	0	0	8
Wayne Middaugh	0	0	2	0	1	0	2	0	4	1	10

Team	1	2	3	4	5	6	7	8	9	10	Final
Rich Moffatt	2	0	1	0	0	1	0	1	0	1	6
Rob Rumfeldt	0	0	0	1	0	0	1	0	1	0	3

Team	1	2	3	4	5	6	7	8	9	10	Final
Bryan Cochrane	2	0	1	0	0	1	0	0	2	0	6
Peter Corner	0	2	0	1	2	0	1	1	0	1	8

=== Draw 8 ===
February 11

Team	1	2	3	4	5	6	7	8	9	10	Final
Peter Corner	2	0	3	0	1	0	3	0	0	X	9
Mike Harris	0	1	0	3	0	1	0	2	1	X	8

Team	1	2	3	4	5	6	7	8	9	10	Final
Rob Rumfeldt	0	0	3	0	1	0	1	0	1	1	7
Kevin Breivik	0	1	0	1	0	1	0	3	0	0	6

Team	1	2	3	4	5	6	7	8	9	10	Final
Jeff McCrady	0	2	0	1	0	1	0	2	0	2	8
Rich Moffatt	0	0	2	0	1	0	1	0	2	0	6

Team	1	2	3	4	5	6	7	8	9	10	Final
Kirk Ziola	2	0	4	0	2	0	2	2	X	X	12
Bryan Cochrane	0	2	0	2	0	2	0	0	X	X	6

Team	1	2	3	4	5	6	7	8	9	10	Final
Wayne Middaugh	1	3	1	3	X	X	X	X	X	X	8
Peter Mellor	0	0	0	0	X	X	X	X	X	X	0

=== Draw 9 ===
February 11

Team	1	2	3	4	5	6	7	8	9	10	Final
Kirk Ziola	0	0	1	0	0	0	3	0	X	X	4
Rich Moffatt	0	3	0	1	1	3	0	2	X	X	10

Team	1	2	3	4	5	6	7	8	9	10	Final
Peter Corner	1	0	0	0	0	2	0	2	0	1	6
Wayne Middaugh	0	0	1	0	2	0	1	0	0	0	4

Team	1	2	3	4	5	6	7	8	9	10	11	Final
Rob Rumfeldt	2	1	0	3	0	1	0	1	0	0	2	10
Bryan Cochrane	0	0	2	0	2	0	2	0	1	1	0	8

Team	1	2	3	4	5	6	7	8	9	10	Final
Peter Mellor	1	1	0	1	0	0	2	0	2	X	7
Jeff McCrady	0	0	1	0	2	4	0	1	0	X	8

Team	1	2	3	4	5	6	7	8	9	10	Final
Mike Harris	0	0	1	1	3	3	X	X	X	X	8
Kevin Breivik	0	0	0	0	0	0	X	X	X	X	0

== Playoffs ==
Semifinal			Final
			1	Wayne Middaugh	4
2	Kirk Ziola	4	3	Peter Corner	6
3	Peter Corner	6

=== Semifinal ===
February 12, 3:00pm

Team	1	2	3	4	5	6	7	8	9	10	Final
Peter Corner	0	0	2	0	2	0	0	0	1	1	6
Kirk Ziola	0	1	0	1	0	1	0	1	0	0	4

=== Final ===
February 13, 1:00pm

Team	1	2	3	4	5	6	7	8	9	10	Final
Wayne Middaugh 🔨	0	0	2	0	1	0	0	0	1	0	4
Peter Corner	1	0	0	2	0	1	0	1	0	1	6

== Qualification ==
Qualification method	Berths	Qualifying team(s)
Region 1	2	Rich Moffatt; Jeff McCrady
Region 2	2	Mike Harris; Wayne Middaugh
Region 3	2	Peter Mellor; Rob Rumfeldt
Region 4	2	Peter Corner; Kirk Ziola
Challenge Round East	1	Bryan Cochrane
Challenge Round West	1	Kevin Breivik

=== Zone Winners ===
Regional winners in bold.

Zone	Skip	Club
1A	Bryan Cochrane	RCMP
1B	Ron Diguer	Ottawa
2A	**Rich Moffatt**	Rideau
2B	**Jeff McCrady**	Rideau
3A	Doug Johnston	Renfrew
3B	Peter Steski	Granite (West Ottawa)
4A	Alex Tosh	Royal Kingston
4B	Bill Hope	Trenton
5A	Gary Davis	Keene
5B	Glen Garneys	Peterborough
6A	Gary Grant	Uxbridge
6B	**Mike Harris**	Tam Heather
7A	Scott McPherson	Bayview
7B	Dennis Elgie	East York
8A	John Base	Oakville
8B	**Wayne Middaugh**	St. George's
9A	John Morris	Stayner
9B	Steve Oldford	Orangeville
10A	Ed Werenich	MacTier
10B	Brian Ross	Cookstown
11A	Pat Johnston	Allenford
11B	**Peter Mellor**	Chesley
12A	Ron Mooibroek	K-W Granite
12B	**Rob Rumfeldt**	Guelph
13A	**Peter Corner**	Glendale
13B	Scott Brown	Glendale
14A	Murray Shannon	Hanover
14B	Brent Ross	Harriston
15A	Nick Rizzo	Brant
15B	Jim Lyle	St. Thomas
16A	**Kirk Ziola**	Highland
16B	Phil Daniel	Tilbury

=== Challenge Round ===
Bryan Cochrane won the East Challenge Round and Kevin Breivik won the West Challenge Round.

== Sources ==
- Ontario Curling Association 1999-00 Annual Report
- - Coverage on curlingzone.com
