= 1983 Canadian Junior Men's Curling Championship =

- Host city: Halifax, Nova Scotia
- Arena: Mayflower Curling Club
- Dates: March 27–April 2
- Winner: Saskatchewan
- Skip: Jamie Schneider
- Third: Danny Ferner
- Second: Steven Leippi
- Lead: Kelly Vollman
- Coach: Mike Schneider
- Finalist: Newfoundland (Frank O'Driscoll)

The 1983 Pepsi Canadian Junior Men's Curling Championship was held March 27–April 2, 1983 at the Mayflower Curling Club in Halifax, Nova Scotia.

After the round robin, Saskatchewan's Jamie Schneider rink from Kronau led the field with a 9–2 record. In a five-way tie for second place with 7–4 records were Newfoundland, Alberta, British Columbia, Quebec and Prince Edward Island. This forced a tiebreaker between the five teams to determine the semifinalists.

In the final, Saskatchewan defeated the Frank O'Driscoll rink, representing Newfoundland, 6–5. The game came down to the last shot, with the teams tied at 5 in the tenth end. Newfoundland attempted to junk up the front of the house, but Saskatchewan played the takeout game, giving skip Jamie Schneider an open house to draw for his single point and the championship. The turning point however came in the eighth end, when Saskatchewan stole two after O'Driscoll missed his last shot. Schneider's performance under pressure at the championship earned him the nickname "Cool Hand Luke".

== Round robin standings ==
Final standings

Key
Teams to Playoffs
Teams to Tiebreakers

Team	Skip	Locale	W	L
Saskatchewan	Jamie Schneider	Kronau	9	2
Prince Edward Island	Wade MacRae	Charlottetown	7	4
Newfoundland	Frank O'Driscoll	Corner Brook	7	4
Quebec	Jim Stewart	Howick	7	4
Alberta	Kevin Park	Lacombe	7	4
British Columbia	Bob McIntosh	Nanaimo	7	4
Ontario	Daniel Lachance	Ottawa	6	5
Manitoba	Bob Ursel	Winnipeg	6	5
Northern Ontario	Roger Sauvé	Sudbury	4	7
Nova Scotia	Bill Hecimovich	Dartmouth	3	8
Northwest Territories/Yukon	Derek Elkin	Yellowknife	2	9
New Brunswick	Danny LeBlanc	Grand Falls	2	9

=== Tiebreakers ===
April 1

Team	1	2	3	4	5	6	7	8	9	10	Final
Alberta (Park)	0	2	0	1	0	0	2	0	2	2	9
British Columbia (McIntosh)	2	0	1	0	1	1	0	3	0	0	8

Team	1	2	3	4	5	6	7	8	9	10	Final
Alberta (Park)	0	0	0	2	0	0	1	0	0	1	4
Prince Edward Island (MacRae)	1	0	1	0	0	2	0	1	1	0	6

Team	1	2	3	4	5	6	7	8	9	10	Final
Newfoundland (O'Driscoll)	0	0	1	0	0	0	0	0	2	0	3
Quebec (Stewart)	1	0	0	0	0	0	1	0	0	0	2

== Playoffs ==
Semifinal		Final
		Saskatchewan	6
Prince Edward Island	3	Newfoundland	5
Newfoundland	5

=== Semifinal ===
April 2

Team	1	2	3	4	5	6	7	8	9	10	Final
Newfoundland (O'Driscoll)	1	0	0	0	0	0	3	1	0	0	5
Prince Edward Island (MacRae)	0	0	1	0	1	1	0	0	0	0	3

=== Final ===
April 2

Team	1	2	3	4	5	6	7	8	9	10	Final
Saskatchewan (Schneider)	0	0	0	1	0	0	2	2	0	1	6
Newfoundland (O'Driscoll)	1	0	1	0	1	0	0	0	2	0	5
