= Pat Ryan (curler) =

Canadian curler (born 1955)

Patrick Ryan
- Curler
- Born: September 28, 1955 (age 71); Winnipeg, Manitoba

Curling career
- Brier: 11 (1979, 1985, 1987, 1988, 1989, 1993, 1994, 1995, 2002, 2003, 2016)
- World Championship: 3 (1988, 1989, 1994)
Medal record
Men's curling
Representing Canada
World Curling Championships
Gold medal – first place	1989 Milwaukee
Gold medal – first place	1994 Oberstdorf
Silver medal – second place	1988 Lausanne
World Senior Curling Championships
Gold medal – first place	2008 Vierumäki
Representing Alberta
Labatt Brier
Gold medal – first place	1988 Chicoutimi-Jonquière
Gold medal – first place	1989 Saskatoon
Silver medal – second place	1985 Moncton
Canadian Olympic Curling Trials
Silver medal – second place	1987 Calgary
Representing British Columbia
Nokia Brier
Gold medal – first place	1994 Red Deer
Silver medal – second place	1993 Ottawa
Bronze medal – third place	2003 Halifax

Patrick J. C. Ryan (born September 28, 1955 in Winnipeg, Manitoba) is a Canadian curler originally from Edmonton, Alberta. Ryan is a former World Champion skip, and three time Brier champion.

== Career ==
Ryan appeared in his first Brier in 1979 when he was the second for Paul Devlin's Alberta team. They finished 6-5. In 1985, Ryan returned to the Brier, as a skip of Team Alberta. His team of Gord Trenchie, Don McKenzie, and Don Walchuk had an impressive 11-1 performance, their only loss coming in the final against Al Hackner of Northern Ontario. Two years later, Ryan would return to the Brier. His new team, which included Randy Ferbey (whom he played with at the 1986 Canadian Mixed Championship) and Roy Herbert along with Walchuk finished with a disappointing 6-5 record. At the 1988 Labatt Brier however, Ryan's Alberta foursome (now with Don McKenzie as lead instead of Herbert) would win the championship defeating Eugene Hritzuk of Saskatchewan in the final. Ryan's team had a perfect 12-0 record. At the World Championships however, Ryan's team would be undefeated all the way to the final against Eigil Ramsfjell of Norway which he lost. Ryan returned to the 1989 Labatt Brier, which he won again, albeit with three losses along the way. Ryan would this time be able to win the 1989 World Championships, again with three losses. He defeated Patrick Hürlimann of Switzerland in the final. Ryan was nicknamed the Ryan Express for his team's ability to peel rocks which led to many low scoring games, but gave the team two straight Brier championships. This strategy was perceived as boring, and elicited jeering from crowds, and forced the rules of curling to be changed with the implementation of the free guard zone.

1993 would be Ryan's next Brier appearance. This time Ryan had moved from Edmonton, Alberta to Kelowna, British Columbia. In 1993, Ryan played third for Rick Folk which lost the final to Russ Howard from Ontario. Ryan and Folk would return to the 1994 Labatt Brier where they won, getting their revenge against Howard in the final. At the 1994 World Championships, Ryan would win his second World Championships, as their team defeated Jan-Olov Nässén of Sweden in the final. Ryan and Folk would return to the Brier again in 1995, however they finished 6-5.

Ryan wouldn't return to the Brier until 2002. By now, Ryan was the skip of team British Columbia, and his team of Deane Horning, Kevin MacKenzie, and Rob Koffski would finish 6-5 at the 2002 Nokia Brier. Ryan's last Brier to date was the 2003 Nokia Brier, where his team of Horning, MacKenzie and Bob Ursel finished 7-6

Ryan moved back to Alberta, and won his first Canadian Senior Curling Championship (for curlers over 50 years old) in 2007 as the skip for Team Alberta. In 2008, Ryan skipped Canada to a World Senior Curling Championship. He moved to Toronto in 2008, and played alternate for Peter Corner's team at the 2009 TSC Stores Tankard.

== Personal life ==
Ryan is currently employed as a chartered professional accountant. He is married and has two children.

Ryan also writes and performs country music solo and performing with his daughter Lynsay. He has released two CDs, Old Dog - New Tricks and Little Bit of Trouble.
