= 1993 Labatt Brier =

- Host city: Ottawa, Ontario
- Arena: Ottawa Civic Centre
- Dates: March 6–14
- Attendance: 130,076
- Winner: Ontario
- Curling club: Penetanguishene CC, Penetanguishene
- Skip: Russ Howard
- Third: Glenn Howard
- Second: Wayne Middaugh
- Lead: Peter Corner
- Alternate: Larry Merkley
- Finalist: British Columbia (Rick Folk)

The 1993 Labatt Brier, Canada's national men's curling championship, was held from March 6 to 14 at the Ottawa Civic Centre in Ottawa, Ontario. The finals featured the all star Team Ontario, consisting of skip Russ Howard, his brother Glenn at third, second Wayne Middaugh and lead Peter Corner against a British Columbia team made up of two expatriate Brier winners in skip Rick Folk (1980 Brier champion for Saskatchewan) and third Pat Ryan (1988 & 1989 Brier champion for Alberta).

The final was won by Ontario. Thanks to steals in the third and fourth ends, they were able to hold on to a victory by a score of 5–3 in the last Brier before the adoption of the free guard zone.

Glenn Howard, Middaugh and Corner would all later compete for Ontario as skips, and both Howard and Middaugh won Briers and World championships as skips.

== Teams ==
The 1993 Brier featured first time skips Greg Ferster of Alberta and Alan O'Leary of Nova Scotia, 1980 Brier champion Rick Folk of British Columbia, the defending 1992 Brier champion Manitoba rink skipped by Vic Peters, 2nd time Brier skips Mike Kennedy of New Brunswick and Pierre Charette of Quebec, 3rd time Brier skips Gary Oke of Newfoundland and Trevor Alexander of the Territories, 3 time Brier champion Rick Lang of Northern Ontario, 1987 Brier champion Russ Howard of Ontario, 1989 Mixed champion Robert Campbell of Prince Edward Island and 1991 Brier runners up Randy Woytowich of Saskatchewan.

Alberta	British Columbia	Manitoba
Leduc Curling Club, Leduc Skip: Greg Ferster; Third: Kelly Kijewski; Second: Calvin Schiewe; Lead: Rich Hipkin; Alternate: Randy Olson	Kelowna Curling Club, Kelowna Skip: Rick Folk; Third: Pat Ryan; Second: Bert Gretzinger; Lead: Gerry Richard; Alternate: Ron Steinhauer	Granite Curling Club, Winnipeg Skip: Vic Peters; Third: Dan Carey; Second: Chris Neufeld; Lead: Don Rudd; Alternate: John Loxton
New Brunswick	Newfoundland	Northern Ontario
Edmundston Curling Club, Edmundston Skip: Mike Kennedy; Third: Brad Fitzherbert; Second: Marc Lecocq; Lead: Dave Coster; Alternate: Gordie McGugan	Rec Plex, Corner Brook Skip: Gary Oke; Third: Don Ryan; Second: Rob Thomas; Lead: Gary Rowe; Alternate: Terry Oke	Fort William Curling Club, Thunder Bay Skip: Rick Lang; Third: Scott Henderson; Second: Ross Tetley; Lead: Art Lappalainen; Alternate: Charles Salina
Nova Scotia	Ontario	Prince Edward Island
Dartmouth Curling Club, Dartmouth Skip: Alan O'Leary; Third: Bob LeClair; Second: Steve Johnston; Lead: Steve Piggott; Alternate: Stuart MacLean	Penetanguishene Curling Club, Penetanguishene Skip: Russ Howard; Third: Glenn Howard; Second: Wayne Middaugh; Lead: Peter Corner; Alternate: Larry Merkley	Charlottetown Curling Club, Charlottetown Skip: Robert Campbell; Third: Peter Gallant; Second: Mark O'Rourke; Lead: Mark Butler; Alternate: Peter MacDonald
Quebec	Saskatchewan	Yukon/Northwest Territories
Buckingham Curling Club, Buckingham Skip: Pierre Charette; Third: Daniel Lemery; Second: Don Westphal; Lead: Louis Biron; Alternate: Eric Carriere	Tartan Curling Club, Regina Skip: Randy Woytowich; Third: Brian McCusker; Second: Wyatt Buck; Lead: John Grundy; Alternate: Dale Graham	Yellowknife Curling Club, Yellowknife Skip: Trevor Alexander; Third: Richard Robertson; Second: Steve Moss; Lead: Scott Alexander; Alternate: Al Delmage

== Map of teams ==
Provincial Winners

== Round-robin standings ==
Key
Teams to Tiebreakers (Note: Since the top four teams finished with the same win–loss record, all four teams had to play in the tiebreakers in order to determine the three teams that would advance to the playoffs.)

Locale	Skip	W	L	Shot Pct.
Manitoba	Vic Peters	8	3	84
British Columbia	Rick Folk	8	3	85
Northern Ontario	Rick Lang	8	3	81
Ontario	Russ Howard	8	3	87
Saskatchewan	Randy Woytowich	6	5	82
Quebec	Pierre Charette	5	6	78
New Brunswick	Mike Kennedy	5	6	79
Newfoundland	Gary Oke	5	6	74
Alberta	Greg Ferster	4	7	77
Prince Edward Island	Robert Campbell	4	7	81
Northwest Territories/Yukon	Trevor Alexander	3	8	72
Nova Scotia	Alan O'Leary	2	9	76

== Round-robin results ==
=== Draw 1 ===
Sheet A	1	2	3	4	5	6	7	8	9	10	Final
Quebec (Charette) 🔨	2	0	0	0	4	1	0	1	0	X	8
New Brunswick (Kennedy)	0	0	1	1	0	0	1	0	1	X	4

Sheet B	1	2	3	4	5	6	7	8	9	10	Final
Ontario (Howard) 🔨	0	0	1	0	0	0	2	0	1	0	4
Manitoba (Peters)	0	1	0	1	0	1	0	1	0	1	5

Sheet C	1	2	3	4	5	6	7	8	9	10	Final
Prince Edward Island (Campbell) 🔨	0	0	3	1	0	0	0	1	0	X	5
Northwest Territories/Yukon (Alexander)	0	2	0	0	1	2	1	0	2	X	8

Sheet D	1	2	3	4	5	6	7	8	9	10	Final
Newfoundland (Oke) 🔨	1	0	0	1	1	0	0	0	1	0	4
Northern Ontario (Lang)	0	2	1	0	0	1	0	1	0	1	6

=== Draw 2 ===
Sheet B	1	2	3	4	5	6	7	8	9	10	Final
Saskatchewan (Woytowich) 🔨	0	0	1	0	2	0	1	0	0	1	5
Nova Scotia (O'Leary)	0	1	0	1	0	0	0	2	0	0	4

Sheet C	1	2	3	4	5	6	7	8	9	10	11	Final
Alberta (Ferster) 🔨	0	0	1	0	0	0	2	0	0	1	0	4
British Columbia (Folk)	0	0	0	2	0	0	0	2	0	0	1	5

=== Draw 3 ===
Sheet A	1	2	3	4	5	6	7	8	9	10	Final
Northwest Territories/Yukon (Alexander) 🔨	2	0	0	0	2	0	0	0	1	X	5
Northern Ontario (Lang)	0	1	1	1	0	3	1	0	0	X	7

Sheet B	1	2	3	4	5	6	7	8	9	10	Final
Prince Edward Island (Campbell) 🔨	2	0	1	0	0	0	1	0	2	0	6
Newfoundland (Oke)	0	1	0	1	2	1	0	1	0	1	7

Sheet C	1	2	3	4	5	6	7	8	9	10	Final
British Columbia (Folk) 🔨	1	0	0	1	0	1	0	0	1	0	4
Ontario (Howard)	0	1	1	0	2	0	0	1	0	1	6

Sheet D	1	2	3	4	5	6	7	8	9	10	Final
Manitoba (Peters) 🔨	0	2	0	2	0	1	1	0	0	0	6
New Brunswick (Kennedy)	0	0	1	0	1	0	0	1	1	1	5

=== Draw 4 ===
Sheet A	1	2	3	4	5	6	7	8	9	10	Final
Saskatchewan (Woytowich) 🔨	0	2	1	2	0	3	0	1	X	X	9
Alberta (Ferster)	0	0	0	0	1	0	1	0	X	X	2

Sheet B	1	2	3	4	5	6	7	8	9	10	Final
New Brunswick (Kennedy) 🔨	0	2	1	0	0	0	1	0	0	0	4
Northwest Territories/Yukon (Alexander)	0	0	0	2	1	1	0	1	1	1	7

Sheet C	1	2	3	4	5	6	7	8	9	10	Final
Northern Ontario (Lang) 🔨	2	0	3	1	0	0	1	0	0	X	7
Nova Scotia (O'Leary)	0	1	0	0	1	0	0	2	0	X	4

Sheet D	1	2	3	4	5	6	7	8	9	10	Final
Ontario (Howard) 🔨	2	0	1	0	3	0	1	0	X	X	7
Quebec (Charette)	0	0	0	1	0	1	0	0	X	X	2

=== Draw 5 ===
Sheet A	1	2	3	4	5	6	7	8	9	10	Final
Manitoba (Peters) 🔨	0	0	1	0	0	0	0	0	3	1	5
Northwest Territories/Yukon (Alexander)	0	0	0	1	0	0	1	1	0	0	3

Sheet B	1	2	3	4	5	6	7	8	9	10	11	Final
Ontario (Howard) 🔨	1	0	0	0	0	0	0	0	0	0	1	2
Prince Edward Island (Campbell)	0	0	0	0	0	1	0	0	0	0	0	1

Sheet C	1	2	3	4	5	6	7	8	9	10	Final
Quebec (Charette) 🔨	1	0	0	0	3	0	2	0	2	2	10
Newfoundland (Oke)	0	2	1	1	0	1	0	2	0	0	7

Sheet D	1	2	3	4	5	6	7	8	9	10	Final
New Brunswick (Kennedy) 🔨	1	0	1	0	0	1	0	1	0	X	4
Northern Ontario (Lang)	0	2	0	3	0	0	1	0	1	X	7

=== Draw 6 ===
Sheet A	1	2	3	4	5	6	7	8	9	10	Final
Nova Scotia (O'Leary) 🔨	1	0	0	2	0	0	0	0	1	0	4
Ontario (Howard)	0	0	1	0	2	2	0	0	0	1	6

Sheet B	1	2	3	4	5	6	7	8	9	10	Final
Northern Ontario (Lang) 🔨	0	1	0	0	2	0	1	0	0	X	4
British Columbia (Folk)	0	0	1	3	0	0	0	2	0	X	6

Sheet C	1	2	3	4	5	6	7	8	9	10	Final
Alberta (Ferster) 🔨	0	0	1	0	0	2	0	1	0	1	5
New Brunswick (Kennedy)	0	0	0	1	0	0	1	0	1	0	3

Sheet D	1	2	3	4	5	6	7	8	9	10	Final
Prince Edward Island (Campbell) 🔨	1	0	2	0	2	1	0	0	0	X	6
Saskatchewan (Woytowich)	0	1	0	1	0	0	1	0	1	X	4

=== Draw 7 ===
Sheet A	1	2	3	4	5	6	7	8	9	10	Final
British Columbia (Folk) 🔨	1	0	0	0	0	0	0	2	0	X	3
Quebec (Charette)	0	0	0	1	0	0	0	0	1	X	2

Sheet B	1	2	3	4	5	6	7	8	9	10	Final
Northwest Territories/Yukon (Alexander) 🔨	1	0	1	0	0	0	3	1	0	X	6
Nova Scotia (O'Leary)	0	1	0	1	0	0	0	0	0	X	2

Sheet C	1	2	3	4	5	6	7	8	9	10	Final
Saskatchewan (Woytowich) 🔨	0	0	0	2	2	1	0	0	1	X	6
Manitoba (Peters)	0	0	0	0	0	0	2	0	X	X	2

Sheet D	1	2	3	4	5	6	7	8	9	10	Final
Newfoundland (Oke) 🔨	0	2	0	0	0	1	0	3	0	X	6
Alberta (Ferster)	0	0	1	1	0	0	1	0	0	X	3

=== Draw 8 ===
Sheet A	1	2	3	4	5	6	7	8	9	10	Final
Prince Edward Island (Campbell) 🔨	0	0	1	0	0	0	0	0	0	X	1
Alberta (Ferster)	1	1	0	0	0	1	1	1	0	X	5

Sheet B	1	2	3	4	5	6	7	8	9	10	11	Final
Saskatchewan (Woytowich) 🔨	1	0	0	0	0	1	0	0	0	1	0	3
New Brunswick (Kennedy)	0	0	0	1	0	0	0	2	0	0	1	4

Sheet C	1	2	3	4	5	6	7	8	9	10	Final
Manitoba (Peters) 🔨	0	1	0	1	2	0	1	0	2	X	7
Northern Ontario (Lang)	0	0	1	0	0	1	0	1	0	X	3

Sheet D	1	2	3	4	5	6	7	8	9	10	Final
Northwest Territories/Yukon (Alexander) 🔨	0	1	0	0	0	1	X	X	X	X	2
British Columbia (Folk)	0	0	1	2	4	0	X	X	X	X	7

=== Draw 9 ===
Sheet A	1	2	3	4	5	6	7	8	9	10	Final
Alberta (Ferster) 🔨	2	0	0	0	1	0	3	0	0	X	6
Northwest Territories/Yukon (Alexander)	0	1	0	0	0	1	0	1	0	X	3

Sheet B	1	2	3	4	5	6	7	8	9	10	11	Final
Quebec (Charette) 🔨	0	0	1	0	1	0	1	0	0	1	0	4
Saskatchewan (Woytowich)	0	0	0	1	0	1	0	1	1	0	1	5

Sheet C	1	2	3	4	5	6	7	8	9	10	Final
New Brunswick (Kennedy) 🔨	0	0	1	0	0	4	0	0	3	X	8
Nova Scotia (O'Leary)	0	0	0	0	1	0	2	0	0	X	3

Sheet D	1	2	3	4	5	6	7	8	9	10	Final
Ontario (Howard) 🔨	0	0	2	0	2	0	0	0	1	X	5
Newfoundland (Oke)	0	0	0	1	0	1	0	0	0	X	2

=== Draw 10 ===
Sheet A	1	2	3	4	5	6	7	8	9	10	Final
Northern Ontario (Lang) 🔨	0	2	0	1	0	1	0	2	0	X	6
Ontario (Howard)	0	0	1	0	1	0	1	0	1	X	4

Sheet B	1	2	3	4	5	6	7	8	9	10	Final
Newfoundland (Oke) 🔨	0	1	0	0	1	0	0	0	1	X	3
Manitoba (Peters)	0	0	3	0	0	2	0	0	0	X	5

Sheet C	1	2	3	4	5	6	7	8	9	10	Final
British Columbia (Folk) 🔨	0	2	0	0	2	0	0	0	0	1	5
Prince Edward Island (Campbell)	0	0	0	1	0	2	0	0	0	0	3

Sheet D	1	2	3	4	5	6	7	8	9	10	Final
Nova Scotia (O'Leary) 🔨	0	2	0	2	0	1	0	0	1	1	7
Quebec (Charette)	1	0	1	0	1	0	1	1	0	0	5

=== Draw 11 ===
Sheet A	1	2	3	4	5	6	7	8	9	10	11	Final
British Columbia (Folk) 🔨	1	1	0	1	0	0	1	0	2	0	1	7
Newfoundland (Oke)	0	0	2	0	0	2	0	1	0	1	0	6

Sheet B	1	2	3	4	5	6	7	8	9	10	Final
Nova Scotia (O'Leary) 🔨	1	0	0	2	1	0	2	0	0	0	6
Prince Edward Island (Campbell)	0	2	2	0	0	0	0	2	0	1	7

Sheet C	1	2	3	4	5	6	7	8	9	10	Final
Northwest Territories/Yukon (Alexander) 🔨	0	1	0	1	0	1	0	0	0	X	3
Ontario (Howard)	0	0	2	0	2	0	0	1	0	X	5

Sheet D	1	2	3	4	5	6	7	8	9	10	Final
Quebec (Charette) 🔨	0	0	0	2	0	1	X	X	X	X	3
Alberta (Ferster)	0	3	2	0	3	0	X	X	X	X	8

=== Draw 12 ===
Sheet A	1	2	3	4	5	6	7	8	9	10	Final
Newfoundland (Oke) 🔨	0	0	1	0	2	0	1	0	0	1	5
New Brunswick (Kennedy)	1	0	0	2	0	1	0	2	0	0	6

Sheet B	1	2	3	4	5	6	7	8	9	10	Final
Northern Ontario (Lang) 🔨	0	0	3	1	0	2	0	1	0	X	7
Quebec (Charette)	0	1	0	0	2	0	1	0	0	X	4

Sheet C	1	2	3	4	5	6	7	8	9	10	Final
Prince Edward Island (Campbell) 🔨	1	0	0	2	0	0	0	1	0	X	4
Manitoba (Peters)	0	0	1	0	0	0	1	0	0	X	2

Sheet D	1	2	3	4	5	6	7	8	9	10	11	Final
Saskatchewan (Woytowich) 🔨	0	1	1	0	0	0	0	0	2	0	1	5
Northwest Territories/Yukon (Alexander)	1	0	0	0	0	0	0	2	0	1	0	4

=== Draw 13 ===
Sheet A	1	2	3	4	5	6	7	8	9	10	Final
Ontario (Howard) 🔨	1	0	0	1	0	0	0	2	0	X	4
Saskatchewan (Woytowich)	0	1	0	0	0	1	0	0	0	X	2

Sheet B	1	2	3	4	5	6	7	8	9	10	11	Final
Alberta (Ferster) 🔨	0	0	0	2	0	0	0	0	0	2	0	4
Northern Ontario (Lang)	0	1	0	0	0	0	1	0	2	0	1	5

Sheet C	1	2	3	4	5	6	7	8	9	10	Final
Manitoba (Peters) 🔨	0	2	0	2	0	1	3	0	X	X	8
Nova Scotia (O'Leary)	0	0	2	0	0	0	0	1	X	X	3

Sheet D	1	2	3	4	5	6	7	8	9	10	Final
New Brunswick (Kennedy) 🔨	2	0	1	0	0	0	2	0	1	X	6
British Columbia (Folk)	0	1	0	0	1	1	0	0	0	X	3

=== Draw 14 ===
Sheet A	1	2	3	4	5	6	7	8	9	10	Final
Nova Scotia (O'Leary) 🔨	0	1	0	0	1	0	2	0	1	0	5
Newfoundland (Oke)	1	0	1	0	0	1	0	1	0	2	6

Sheet B	1	2	3	4	5	6	7	8	9	10	Final
New Brunswick (Kennedy) 🔨	2	2	0	0	3	0	0	4	0	X	11
Ontario (Howard)	0	0	2	2	0	2	0	0	3	X	9

Sheet C	1	2	3	4	5	6	7	8	9	10	Final
Saskatchewan (Woytowich) 🔨	0	0	1	0	4	0	1	0	1	X	7
Northern Ontario (Lang)	0	0	0	2	0	0	0	2	0	X	4

Sheet D	1	2	3	4	5	6	7	8	9	10	Final
Quebec (Charette) 🔨	3	0	0	4	0	0	2	X	X	X	9
Manitoba (Peters)	0	0	1	0	2	0	0	X	X	X	3

=== Draw 15 ===
Sheet A	1	2	3	4	5	6	7	8	9	10	Final
Manitoba (Peters) 🔨	0	1	0	0	1	0	2	0	0	0	4
British Columbia (Folk)	0	0	1	0	0	0	0	1	0	1	3

Sheet B	1	2	3	4	5	6	7	8	9	10	Final
Alberta (Ferster) 🔨	1	0	1	0	0	2	0	0	1	0	5
Nova Scotia (O'Leary)	0	1	0	2	2	0	1	1	0	1	8

Sheet C	1	2	3	4	5	6	7	8	9	10	Final
Northwest Territories/Yukon (Alexander) 🔨	0	0	0	2	0	1	0	1	1	0	5
Quebec (Charette)	1	0	1	0	2	0	1	0	0	1	6

Sheet D	1	2	3	4	5	6	7	8	9	10	Final
Northern Ontario (Lang) 🔨	1	2	1	0	0	2	0	0	0	0	6
Prince Edward Island (Campbell)	0	0	0	1	1	0	3	0	0	0	5

=== Draw 16 ===
Sheet A	1	2	3	4	5	6	7	8	9	10	Final
Prince Edward Island (Campbell) 🔨	0	0	0	2	0	1	0	2	0	X	5
New Brunswick (Kennedy)	0	0	0	0	1	0	1	0	0	X	2

Sheet B	1	2	3	4	5	6	7	8	9	10	Final
British Columbia (Folk) 🔨	2	0	0	2	0	2	2	0	0	1	9
Saskatchewan (Woytowich)	0	1	2	0	1	0	0	1	2	0	7

Sheet C	1	2	3	4	5	6	7	8	9	10	Final
Ontario (Howard) 🔨	2	2	0	1	0	1	0	0	3	X	9
Alberta (Ferster)	0	0	0	0	1	0	2	1	0	X	4

Sheet D	1	2	3	4	5	6	7	8	9	10	Final
Newfoundland (Oke) 🔨	2	0	2	1	0	2	0	1	0	2	10
Northwest Territories/Yukon (Alexander)	0	1	0	0	3	0	2	0	1	0	7

=== Draw 17 ===
Sheet A	1	2	3	4	5	6	7	8	9	10	11	Final
Alberta (Ferster) 🔨	1	0	0	0	0	2	0	0	1	0	0	4
Manitoba (Peters)	0	0	2	0	0	0	0	1	0	1	1	5

Sheet B	1	2	3	4	5	6	7	8	9	10	Final
Quebec (Charette) 🔨	3	1	0	1	0	0	1	0	0	1	7
Prince Edward Island (Campbell)	0	0	3	0	1	0	0	1	0	0	5

Sheet C	1	2	3	4	5	6	7	8	9	10	Final
Newfoundland (Oke)	2	0	0	0	1	0	3	0	2	X	8
Saskatchewan (Woytowich)	0	2	0	1	0	1	0	1	0	X	5

Sheet D	1	2	3	4	5	6	7	8	9	10	Final
Nova Scotia (O'Leary) 🔨	0	1	0	1	0	0	0	0	1	X	3
British Columbia (Folk)	0	0	3	0	1	0	2	1	0	X	7

== Tiebreakers ==
A series of tiebreakers were played between the four teams tied at first with an 8–3 record. Manitoba, who had beaten all three teams in the round-robin, was seeded first, but lost both of their tiebreaker games, eliminating them from the three-team playoffs.

Semifinals
Ontario	6
Manitoba	4
Northern Ontario	3
British Columbia	5

Final
Ontario	3
British Columbia	1
To Playoffs
Manitoba	5
Northern Ontario	6

=== Round 1 ===
Sheet B	1	2	3	4	5	6	7	8	9	10	Final
Ontario (Howard)	0	0	2	0	3	0	0	0	1	X	6
Manitoba (Peters) 🔨	0	1	0	1	0	2	0	0	0	X	4

Player percentages
Ontario		Manitoba	
Peter Corner	76%	Don Rudd	94%
Wayne Middaugh	88%	Chris Neufeld	85%
Glenn Howard	93%	Dan Carey	86%
Russ Howard	80%	Vic Peters	83%
Total	84%	Total	87%

Sheet C	1	2	3	4	5	6	7	8	9	10	Final
Northern Ontario (Lang) 🔨	0	1	0	0	1	0	1	0	0	0	3
British Columbia (Folk)	0	0	2	0	0	2	0	0	0	1	5

Player percentages
Northern Ontario		British Columbia	
Art Lappalainen	90%	Gerry Richard	93%
Ross Tetley	75%	Bert Gretzinger	92%
Scott Henderson	75%	Pat Ryan	86%
Rick Lang	72%	Rick Folk	89%
Total	78%	Total	90%

=== Round 2 ===
Sheet B	1	2	3	4	5	6	7	8	9	10	Final
Northern Ontario (Lang)	1	0	0	1	0	1	0	1	1	1	6
Manitoba (Peters) 🔨	0	2	1	0	1	0	1	0	0	0	5

Player percentages
Northern Ontario		Manitoba	
Art Lappalainen	94%	Don Rudd	78%
Ross Tetley	84%	Chris Neufeld	90%
Scott Henderson	78%	Dan Carey	78%
Rick Lang	69%	Vic Peters	81%
Total	81%	Total	82%

Sheet C	1	2	3	4	5	6	7	8	9	10	Final
British Columbia (Folk)	0	0	0	0	1	0	0	0	0	X	1
Ontario (Howard) 🔨	1	0	1	0	0	1	0	0	0	X	3

Player percentages
British Columbia		Ontario	
Gerry Richard	98%	Peter Corner	94%
Bert Gretzinger	95%	Wayne Middaugh	98%
Pat Ryan	95%	Glenn Howard	100%
Rick Folk	79%	Russ Howard	84%
Total	92%	Total	94%

== Playoffs ==
Semifinal			Final
			1	Ontario	5
2	British Columbia	5	2	British Columbia	3
3	Northern Ontario	3

=== Semifinal ===
Sheet C	1	2	3	4	5	6	7	8	9	10	Final
Northern Ontario (Lang)	0	0	0	1	0	1	0	0	1	0	3
British Columbia (Folk) 🔨	0	0	1	0	1	0	2	0	0	1	5

Player percentages
Northern Ontario		British Columbia	
Art Lappalainen	96%	Gerry Richard	85%
Ross Tetley	86%	Bert Gretzinger	76%
Scott Henderson	71%	Pat Ryan	80%
Rick Lang	85%	Rick Folk	86%
Total	85%	Total	82%

=== Final ===
Sheet C	1	2	3	4	5	6	7	8	9	10	Final
British Columbia (Folk)	0	0	0	0	1	0	0	2	0	0	3
Ontario (Howard) 🔨	0	1	1	1	0	1	0	0	0	1	5

Player percentages
British Columbia		Ontario	
Gerry Richard	86%	Peter Corner	95%
Bert Gretzinger	90%	Wayne Middaugh	93%
Pat Ryan	95%	Glenn Howard	81%
Rick Folk	82%	Russ Howard	86%
Total	88%	Total	89%

== Statistics ==
=== Top 5 player percentages ===
Round Robin only

Leads	%
(Ontario) Peter Corner	93
(Quebec) Louis Biron	89
(Prince Edward Island) Mark Butler	88
(British Columbia) Gerry Richard	87
(Alberta) Rich Hipkin	87

Seconds	%
(Ontario) Wayne Middaugh	87
(British Columbia) Bert Gretzinger	85
(Manitoba) Chris Neufeld	85
(Saskatchewan) Wyatt Buck	84
(Prince Edward Island) Mark O'Rourke	83

Thirds	%
(British Columbia) Pat Ryan	88
(Ontario) Glenn Howard	86
(Manitoba) Dan Carey	84
(Saskatchewan) Brian McCusker	81
(Prince Edward Island) Peter Gallant	80

Skips	%
(Ontario) Russ Howard	83
(Manitoba) Vic Peters	81
(British Columbia) Rick Folk	81
(Northern Ontario) Rick Lang	77
(Quebec) Pierre Charette	77

=== Team percentages ===
Round Robin only

Province	Skip	%
Ontario	Russ Howard	87
British Columbia	Rick Folk	85
Manitoba	Vic Peters	84
Saskatchewan	Randy Woytowich	82
Prince Edward Island	Robert Campbell	81
Northern Ontario	Rick Lang	81
New Brunswick	Mike Kennedy	79
Quebec	Pierre Charette	78
Alberta	Greg Ferster	77
Nova Scotia	Alan O'Leary	76
Newfoundland	Gary Oke	74
Northwest Territories/Yukon	Trevor Alexander	72
