= Peter Corner =

Canadian curler

- Curler
- Born: May 20, 1968 (age 58); Brampton, Ontario, Canada

Team
- Curling club: St. George's G&CC, Toronto, ON

Curling career
- Member Association: Ontario
- Brier: 5 (1991, 1992, 1993, 1994, 2000)
- Top CTRS ranking: 14th (2007-08)
Medal record
Men's Curling
World Curling Championships
Gold medal – first place	1993 Geneva

Peter J. Corner (born May 20, 1968 in Brampton, Ontario) is a Canadian curler from Burlington, Ontario.

== Career ==
Corner was a member of the 1993 "dream team" of his cousin Wayne Middaugh and the brothers of Glenn and Russ Howard. Corner played lead for the team. All four players would skip teams to provincial championships in the future. In 1993, the team won the Brier and World Championship.

Corner played in his first national championships at the 1987 Canadian Junior Curling Championships playing third for Middaugh. The team lost in the final to New Brunswick's Jim Sullivan.

Corner joined forces with the Howards in 1990, and qualified for their first Brier in 1991. However, at the 1991 Labatt Brier, the team missed the playoffs with a 6-5 record. The 1992 Labatt Brier was more successful for the team, which lost the final to Manitoba's Vic Peters. They improved on this at the 1993 Labatt Brier where they defeated Rick Folk of British Columbia in the final. At the 1993 World Curling Championships, they defeated David Smith of Scotland in the final.

The 1994 Labatt Brier would be their last as a team. They went to their third straight Brier finals, but this time they lost to Folk. After that, Corner went on to form his own team. This won him the 2000 provincial championships, earning him the right to represent Ontario at the 2000 Labatt Brier. Corner lost to Jeff Stoughton of Manitoba in the tie-breaker game, despite finishing with an impressive 8-3 record. Corner would not return to the Brier.

Corner moved back to play with Middaugh as his third for the 2006 and 2007 seasons, but has since left the team to skip his own again.
