= Kelowna Curling Club =

Curling club in Kelowna, British Columbia

- Location: 551 Recreation Avenue; Kelowna, British Columbia; V1Y 7V5
- Arena: Kelowna Curling Club

Information
- Club type: Dedicated ice
- Sheets of ice: 12
- Rock colours: Red and Yellow
- Website: https://www.kelownacurling.com/

The Kelowna Curling Club, located in Kelowna, British Columbia, Canada, is one of the largest and most active curling clubs in the world. The Club has 12 sheets and can seat over 1,000 spectators.

The Club has hosted several World Curling competitions, including the 2002 World Junior Curling Championships, the 2018 World Mixed Curling Championship, and the 2023 Pan Continental Curling Championships. The Club also hosted the Olympic Qualification Event for Curling at the 2026 Winter Olympics in December 2025.

== Alumni ==
Name	Notable Events
Mary-Anne Arsenault	2022 Scotties Tournament of Hearts
Sasha Carter	2007 Scotties Tournament of Hearts, 2005 ROTR, 2022 Scotties Tournament of Hearts
Kevin Folk	2000 World Junior Curling Championships, 2012 Tim Hortons Brier
Rick Folk	1993 Labatt Brier, 1994 Labatt Brier
Sean Geall	2018 Tim Hortons Brier
Tyrel Griffith	2014 Tim Hortons Brier, 2013 ROTR, 2025 Canadian Mixed Doubles Olympic Trials
Gerry Richard	1993 Labatt Brier, 1994 Labatt Brier
Jeff Richard	2018 Tim Hortons Brier
Rick Sawatsky	2014 Tim Hortons Brier, 2013 ROTR
Jeanna Schraeder	2007 Scotties Tournament of Hearts, 2005 ROTR, 2022 Scotties Tournament of Hearts
Kelly Scott	2007 Scotties Tournament of Hearts, 2005 ROTR
Renee Simons	2007 Scotties Tournament of Hearts, 2005 ROTR, 2022 Scotties Tournament of Hearts
Bob Ursel	2003 Nokia Brier, 2008 Tim Hortons Brier
Sarah Wazney	2013 Scotties Tournament of Hearts, 2008 World Junior Curling Championships
