= Bob Ursel =

Canadian curler and curling coach (born 1965)

- Curler
- Born: February 12, 1965 (age 61); Winnipeg, Manitoba, Canada

Team
- Curling club: Kelowna CC, Kelowna

Curling career
- Brier: 3 (1999, 2003, 2008)
- Top CTRS ranking: 10th (2007-08, 2009-10)
- Grand Slam victories: 0
Medal record
Curling
World Junior Championships
Gold medal – first place	1985 Perth
Nokia Brier
Bronze medal – third place	2003 Halifax

Robert (Bob) "Bobby" Ursel (born February 12, 1965) is a Canadian curler and curling coach. Born in Winnipeg, Manitoba, Ursel lives of Kelowna, British Columbia.

== Curling career ==
After finishing 6–5 at the 1983 Canadian Junior Men's Curling Championship, Ursel skipped his native Manitoba to a Canadian Junior Curling Championship In 1984. The following year, he skipped the Canadian Junior Team to a World Junior Curling Championship title. That team was inducted into the Manitoba Sports Hall of Fame in 2016.

It would be 15 years out of junior that Ursel would finally make it to the Brier. He played third for Bert Gretzinger's 1999 British Columbia team. They finished 5-6. In 2002 Ursel moved to play third for Pat Ryan where he made the 2003 Nokia Brier. At the 2003 Brier, the team lost in the semi-final to Nova Scotia (skipped by Mark Dacey).

After the 2003 Brier, Ursel left the Ryan team to form his own team. Ursel won his third and final BC provincial championship, and only one as skip in 2008, when he defeated former World Champion Greg McAulay 8–7 in the final an extra end. He played in his third Brier in 2008 where he lost in the 3-4 game to Ontario's Glenn Howard.

Ursel sat out most of the 2010-11 season with a knee injury. His team continued to be referred to as "Team Ursel" on the World Curling Tour, but he was replaced by Ken Maskiewich at the third position while regular fourth Jim Cotter took over the reins as skip.

He is the coach of Japanese men's team, who won gold at the 2018 Pacific-Asia Curling Championships.

== Personal life ==
Ursel's father, Jim, won the 1977 Brier as skip of the Quebec team. Ursel is currently married, and has four children. Prior to becoming the Japanese national team coach, he was employed as a police officer.

== Grand Slam record ==
Key
C	Champion
F	Lost in Final
SF	Lost in Semifinal
QF	Lost in Quarterfinals
R16	Lost in the round of 16
Q	Did not advance to playoffs
T2	Played in Tier 2 event
DNP	Did not participate in event
N/A	Not a Grand Slam event that season

Event	2004–05	2005–06	2006–07	2007–08	2008–09	2009–10
Masters	Q	DNP	Q	DNP	Q	DNP
Canadian Open	DNP	DNP	DNP	Q	Q	QF
The National	DNP	DNP	DNP	DNP	Q	Q
Players' Championships	DNP	DNP	DNP	DNP	DNP	Q
