= Kevin Folk =

Canadian curler (born 1980)

- Curler
- Born: July 26, 1980 (age 46); Saskatoon, Saskatchewan

Curling career
- Brier: 3 (2008, 2011, 2012)
- Top CTRS ranking: 10th (2007–08, 2009–10)
- Grand Slam victories: 0
Medal record
Curling
World Junior Championships
Gold medal – first place	2000 Geising

Kevin Folk (born July 26, 1980 in Saskatoon, Saskatchewan) is a Canadian curler originally from Kelowna, British Columbia. He previously played third for Jim Cotter.

== Career ==
Folk won the 2000 Canadian Junior Curling Championships playing third for Brad Kuhn. The team then went on to win the 2000 World Junior Curling Championships.

After juniors, Folk joined with his father, two-time Brier and World Champion, Rick Folk's team. He left the team in 2005 to join up with Bob Ursel. Folk qualified for his first Brier in 2008 with Ursel, and the team finished in fourth place, losing the 3–4 game to Glenn Howard of Ontario. Cotter took over the reins as skip of the rink in 2011.

Folk left the team after the 2011–12 season, when he took a job in Calgary.

== Personal life ==
As of 2012, Folk is a senior account manager at RBC Royal Bank. He studied at Okanagan University College.

Folk's parents are former Canadian Mixed champions. Folk's father, Rick Folk, is a two-time Brier and World champion and a former politician, holding a seat in the Legislative Assembly of Saskatchewan.

== Teams ==
Season	Skip	Third	Second	Lead
2003–04	Rick Folk	Kevin Folk	Jeff Richard	Gerry Richard
2004–05	Rick Folk	Kevin Folk	Jeff Richard	Gerry Richard
2005–06	Brad Kuhn (fourth)	Kevin Folk	Ryan Kuhn	Rick Folk (skip)
2006–07	Bert Gretzinger	Kevin Folk	Mark Whittle	Dave Mellof
2007–08	Jim Cotter (fourth)	Bob Ursel (skip)	Kevin Folk	Rick Sawatsky
2008–09	Jim Cotter (fourth)	Bob Ursel (skip)	Kevin Folk	Rick Sawatsky
2009–10	Jim Cotter (fourth)	Bob Ursel (skip)	Kevin Folk	Rick Sawatsky
2010–11	Jim Cotter	Ken Maskiewich	Kevin Folk	Rick Sawatsky
2011–12	Jim Cotter	Kevin Folk	Tyrel Griffith	Rick Sawatsky
