= Rick Folk =

Canadian politician and curler

The Honourable Rick Folk ECS

Member of the Saskatchewan Legislative Assembly for Saskatoon University
- In office April 26, 1982 – October 20, 1986
- Preceded by: Riding Established
- Succeeded by: Peter Prebble

Personal details
- Born: March 5, 1950 (age 76) Saskatoon, Saskatchewan, Canada
- Party: Progressive Conservative

Richard Dale “Rick” Folk (born March 5, 1950, in Saskatoon, Saskatchewan) is a Canadian curler and former Member of the Legislative Assembly of Saskatchewan, where he represented the Progressive Conservative Party for one term from 1982 until 1986. He is a two-time world curling champion, representing Canada. When curling in Canada, Folk represented both Saskatchewan and British Columbia.

== Curling career ==
Richard Dale Folk
- Curler
- Born: March 5, 1950 (age 76); Saskatoon, Saskatchewan

Team
- Curling club: Kelowna CC, Kelowna, British Columbia

Curling career
- Brier: 7 (1978, 1979, 1980, 1989, 1993, 1994, 1995)
- World Championship: 2 (1980, 1994)
Medal record
Men's Curling
Representing Canada
World Curling Championships
Gold medal – first place	1980 Moncton
Gold medal – first place	1994 Oberstdorf
Representing Saskatchewan
Macdonald Brier
Silver medal – second place	1978 Vancouver
Silver medal – second place	1979 Ottawa
Labatt Brier
Gold medal – first place	1980 Calgary
Representing British Columbia
Labatt Brier
Gold medal – first place	1994 Red Deer
Silver medal – second place	1989 Saskatoon
Silver medal – second place	1993 Ottawa

In 1974, Folk skipped the Saskatchewan team to the Canadian Mixed Curling Championship that year. Four years later, he attended his first Brier, skipping the Saskatchewan team. In 1980, he won his first Brier and went on to win the World Curling Championships, posting an undefeated record and defeating Norway in the final. In 1983, Folk won another Canadian Mixed Championship.

After serving in government, Folk moved to Kelowna, British Columbia. He represented British Columbia at the Brier for the first time in 1989, and won his second Brier in 1994, this time skipping the B.C. team. He lost just one game at the Worlds that year, and beat Sweden in the final to claim gold in a low scoring 3-2 decision. In 1995, Folk played in his last Brier. Folk and his rink from the 1994 World Championships were inducted into the BC Sports Hall of Fame in 1995. Folk has also been honoured by the Saskatchewan Sports Hall of Fame as well as the Canadian Curling Hall of Fame.

== Political career ==
Folk ran in the riding of Saskatoon University in the 1982 Saskatchewan provincial election for the Saskatchewan Progressive Conservative Party. Folk won the seat, and served as Minister for Culture and Recreation from 1983 to 1986. Folk was not re-elected in the 1986 election, losing to Peter Prebble of the Saskatchewan New Democratic Party.

== Personal life ==
Folk was born in Saskatoon at the Saskatoon City Hospital, the son of Alex and Jen Folk. At the time of the 1994 Brier, Folk owned a curling and golf supply store in Kelowna. His son, Kevin is also a curler.

As of 2023, he was living in the Comox Valley of British Columbia, and is the head referee of BC Pickleball.
