= Nunavut at the Scotties Tournament of Hearts =

The Canadian territory of Nunavut, which was created in 1999, was first given representation at the Scotties Tournament of Hearts, Canada's national women's curling championship in 2015, following a decision to allow each of Canada's three territories to have their own teams. The Nunavut Curling Association declined their spot, but began competing in 2016.

== 2016 ==
The territory had a playdown in 2016 featuring two teams from the Iqaluit Curling Club, which was won by the Geneva Chislett rink. They were supposed to play a team from Rankin Inlet for the territorial championship, but that team pulled out at the last minute.

At the 2016 Scotties Tournament of Hearts, the Chislett team played in a pre-qualifying event, where they scored an historic win in their first ever game, against British Columbia's Karla Thompson team. The team lost their next two matches however, and did not qualify for the main tournament.

== 2017 ==
Team Chislett again represented Nunavut at the 2017 Scotties Tournament of Hearts. The team lost all three of their games in the pre-qualifying tournament.

== 2018 ==
After they had already qualified for the 2018 Scotties Tournament of Hearts, Team Chislett member Sadie Pinksen had to pullout due to a scheduling conflict, so the team asked St. Mary's, Ontario, resident Amie Shackleton to skip the team. Shackleton had never played for the team before, and met them at a practice session on the Thursday before the Hearts began. Curling Canada allows each team to have one player from outside their jurisdiction to play for the team.

The 2018 Scotties eliminated the controversial pre-qualifying event, instead grouped 16 teams into two pools of eight. The Shackleton-led rink lost all seven of their group games, and then lost the 15th place game to Team Yukon, skipped by Chelsea Duncan.

== 2019 ==
The 2019 Nunavut playdowns for the 2019 Scotties Tournament of Hearts consisted of three rinks, and was played in December 2018. The Iqaluit Curling Club's Jenine Bodner won the event, which also included the Robyn Mackey and Sadie Pinksen rinks. The Bodner rink included recreational curler Jennifer Blaney from Ottawa as their fourth stone thrower, who joined the team for the season. At the 2019 Scotties Tournament of Hearts, the team won their first game against Quebec (skipped by Gabrielle Lavoie), but lost their remaining six matches, finishing seventh in their pool, ahead of Quebec.

== 2020 ==
Only one team entered the playdowns for the 2020 Scotties Tournament of Hearts, so no playdown was held. Dundas, Ontario, curler (and 1997 Hearts runner-up) Lori Eddy skipped a team consisting of Sadie Pinksen, Alison Griffin and Kaitlin MacDonald at the 2020 Hearts. Eddy was approached by the team in June 2019 to see if she'd be interested. The team improved upon their previous record, winning 2 of their 7 games, defeating Northern Ontario's Krista McCarville rink in a surprise victory, and also Quebec.

== 2021 ==
Dundas, Ontario's Lori Eddy and her rink of Pinksen, Griffin and MacDonald were the only teams to enter the 2021 Nunavut playdowns again. The 2021 Scotties Tournament of Hearts was expanded to 18 teams, adding two Wild Card teams, giving Nunavut an extra game. Unlike in 2020 they were unable to win any games, with the team going 0–8. They finished tied for last place, as Yukon which was playing in a different pool also finished 0–8.

== 2022 ==
Team Nunavut at the 2022 Scotties Tournament of Hearts was skipped by Halifax, Nova Scotia, chiropractor Brigitte MacPhail, who joined the team following the advice of coach Donalda Mattie. The team in 2022 also included Pinksen, MacDonald and Alison Taylor. Only Taylor was living in Nunavut at the time, as Pinksen was attending Dalhousie University in Nova Scotia and MacDonald was attending the University of Prince Edward Island. The Iqaluit Curling Club was closed for much of the season due to the COVID-19 pandemic in Nunavut and the local water crisis. At the Hearts that year, the team once again went winless, finishing 0–8, tied with the Yukon which was playing in the other pool.

== 2023 ==
Brigitte MacPhail defeated Angela Dale in the territorial championship, which was held in December 2022. For the third straight year, the team did not win any games in Pool A at the Scotties, finishing 0–8, which was last among the 18 teams in the field.

== 2024 ==
On January 8, 2024, Curling Canada announced that Nunavut withdrew from the 2024 Scotties Tournament of Hearts as no teams registered for the territorial playdowns. The Nunavut Curling Association stated a smaller pool of competitive players and the early season closure of the Iqaluit Curling Club due to the filming of the CBC/Netflix/APTN show North of North at the club were factors into the decision.

== 2025–26 ==
On December 23, 2024, Nunavut Curling Association announced that team a skipped by Ottawa's Julia Weagle (sister of Olympic curler Lisa Weagle) represented Nunavut at the 2025 Scotties Tournament of Hearts as they were the only team to enter the Playdowns. In 2024, the father of the team's second Leigh Gustafson spoke to Weagle's father about joining the team. The team played together for the first time at the Stroud Sleeman Cash Spiel, winning one game. At the Scotties, the team went 0–8, finishing last in Group A, and last place overall.

For the 2026 Championships, Team Weagle was again the only team to enter the playdowns, qualifying them to represent Nunavut at the 2026 Scotties.

== Results ==
Year	Team	Club	Record (placement)
2026	Julia Weagle, Sadie Pinksen, Leigh Gustafson, Alison Taylor	Iqaluit	TBD
2025	Julia Weagle, Sadie Pinksen, Leigh Gustafson, Alison Taylor	Iqaluit	0–8 (18th of 18)
2024	Declined Invite		
2023	Brigitte MacPhail, Sadie Pinksen, Kaitlin MacDonald, Alison Taylor	Iqaluit	0–8 (18th of 18)
2022	Brigitte MacPhail, Sadie Pinksen, Kaitlin MacDonald, Alison Taylor	Iqaluit	0–8 (T17th of 18)
2021	Lori Eddy, Sadie Pinksen, Alison Griffin, Kaitlin MacDonald	Iqaluit	0–8 (T17th of 18)
2020	Lori Eddy, Sadie Pinksen, Alison Griffin, Kaitlin MacDonald	Iqaluit	2–5 (13th of 16)
2019	Jennifer Blaney, Alison Griffin, Jenine Bodner (Skip), Megan Ingram, Sadie Pinksen	Iqaluit	1–6 (13th of 16)
2018	Amie Shackleton, Geneva Chislett, Christianne West, Denise Hutchings, Robyn Mackey	Iqaluit	0–8 (16th of 16)
2017	Geneva Chislett, Denise Hutchings, Robyn Mackey, Jenine Bodner, Sadie Pinksen	Iqaluit	0–3 (15th of 15)
2016	Geneva Chislett, Denise Hutchings, Robyn Mackey, Jenine Bodner, Sadie Pinksen	Iqaluit	1–2 (15th of 15)
