= 2015 Canadian Junior Curling Championships – Women's tournament =

2015 Canadian Junior Curling Championships Women's tournament
- Host city: Corner Brook, Newfoundland and Labrador
- Arena: Corner Brook Civic Centre; Corner Brook Curling Club
- Dates: January 24–February 1
- Winner: Alberta
- Curling club: Saville SC, Edmonton
- Skip: Kelsey Rocque
- Third: Danielle Schmiemann
- Second: Holly Jamieson
- Lead: Jessica Iles
- Finalist: Ontario (Chelsea Brandwood)

The women's tournament of the 2015 M&M Meat Shops Canadian Junior Curling Championships will be held from January 24 to February 1 at the Corner Brook Civic Centre and the Corner Brook Curling Club.

== Teams ==
The teams are listed as follows:

Province	Skip	Third	Second	Lead	Club(s)
Alberta	Kelsey Rocque	Danielle Schmiemann	Holly Jamieson	Jessica Iles	Saville SC, Edmonton
British Columbia	Corryn Brown	Erin Pincott	Samantha Fisher	Sydney Fraser	Kamloops CC, Kamloops
Manitoba	Beth Peterson	Robyn Njegovan	Melissa Gordon	Breanne Yozenko	Fort Rouge CC, Winnipeg
New Brunswick	Justine Comeau	Emma Le Blanc	Brigitte Comeau	Keira McLaughlin	Capital WC, Fredericton
Newfoundland and Labrador	Sarah Hill	Danielle Wiseman	Sarah Ford	Heidi Trickett	Re/Max CC, St. John's
Northwest Territories	Carina McKay-Saturnino	Karly King Simpson	Rayna Vittrekwa	Hilary Charlie	Inuvik CC, Inuvik
Northern Ontario	Krysta Burns	Leah Hodgson	Sara Guy	Laura Masters	Idylwylde G&CC, Sudbury
Nova Scotia	Mary Fay	Jenn Smith	Karlee Burgess	Janique LeBlanc	Chester CC, Chester
Nunavut	Sadie Pinksen	Christianne West	Katie Chislett Manning	Kaitlin MacDonald	Iqaluit CC, Iqaluit
Ontario	Chelsea Brandwood	Claire Greenlees	Brenda Holloway	Danielle Greenlees	Glendale CC, Hamilton
Prince Edward Island	Veronica Smith	Chloé McCloskey	Sabrina Smith	Katie Fullerton	Cornwall CC, Charlottetown
Quebec	Émilia Gagné	Claudie Gobeil-Tremblay	Julie Fortin	Marie-Pier Harvey	CC Riverbend, Alma; CC Kénogami, Jonquière
Saskatchewan	Kristen Streifel	Karlee Korchinski	Hayley Unrau	Haylee Jameson	Nutana CC, Saskatoon
Yukon	Bailey Horte	Kelsey Meger	Kelly Mahoney	Sian Molloy	Whitehorse CC, Whitehorse

== Round-robin standings ==
Final round-robin standings

Key
Teams to Championship Pool

Pool A	Skip	W	L
Alberta	Kelsey Rocque	6	0
Ontario	Chelsea Brandwood	5	1
Quebec	Émilia Gagné	4	2
Manitoba	Beth Peterson	3	3
Northern Ontario	Krysta Burns	2	4
Yukon	Bailey Horte	1	5
Nunavut	Sadie Pinksen	0	6

Pool B	Skip	W	L
British Columbia	Corryn Brown	6	0
Nova Scotia	Mary Fay	4	2
Saskatchewan	Kristen Streifel	4	2
New Brunswick	Justine Comeau	3	3
Prince Edward Island	Veronica Smith	2	4
Newfoundland and Labrador	Sarah Hill	1	5
Northwest Territories	Carina McKay-Saturnino	1	5

== Round-robin results ==
All draw times are listed in Newfoundland Standard Time (UTC−3:30).

=== Pool A ===
==== Draw 1 ====
Saturday, January 24, 10:00 am

Sheet A	1	2	3	4	5	6	7	8	9	10	Final
Northern Ontario (Burns)	0	2	0	1	0	1	1	1	0	1	7
Manitoba (Peterson) 🔨	2	0	2	0	1	0	0	0	3	0	8

Sheet B	1	2	3	4	5	6	7	8	9	10	Final
Yukon (Horte)	0	1	0	1	0	1	0	2	0	0	5
Alberta (Rocque) 🔨	4	0	1	0	3	0	3	0	1	2	14

Sheet C	1	2	3	4	5	6	7	8	9	10	Final
Nunavut (Pinksen)	0	0	0	1	0	1	0	1	X	X	3
Ontario (Brandwood) 🔨	0	2	3	0	3	0	3	0	X	X	11

==== Draw 2 ====
Saturday, January 24, 2:30 pm

Sheet A	1	2	3	4	5	6	7	8	9	10	Final
Yukon (Horte) 🔨	1	3	1	1	0	0	2	0	X	X	8
Nunavut (Pinksen)	0	0	0	0	1	1	0	1	X	X	3

Sheet B	1	2	3	4	5	6	7	8	9	10	Final
Ontario (Brandwood) 🔨	2	0	3	0	2	0	0	1	0	2	10
Quebec (Gagné)	0	1	0	1	0	1	1	0	2	0	6

==== Draw 3 ====
Saturday, January 24, 7:30 pm

Sheet H	1	2	3	4	5	6	7	8	9	10	11	Final
Manitoba (Peterson) 🔨	1	0	0	1	0	0	1	0	0	1	0	4
Alberta (Rocque)	0	0	1	0	2	0	0	1	0	0	1	5

==== Draw 4 ====
Sunday, January 25, 10:00 am

Sheet D	1	2	3	4	5	6	7	8	9	10	Final
Quebec (Gagné) 🔨	2	1	0	1	1	3	2	0	X	X	10
Yukon (Horte)	0	0	0	0	0	0	0	2	X	X	2

Sheet E	1	2	3	4	5	6	7	8	9	10	Final
Nunavut (Pinksen) 🔨	1	0	0	0	2	0	0	0	X	X	3
Manitoba (Peterson)	0	1	4	2	0	4	2	1	X	X	14

Sheet H	1	2	3	4	5	6	7	8	9	10	Final
Northern Ontario (Burns)	0	0	0	2	1	1	0	1	0	X	5
Ontario (Brandwood) 🔨	0	0	3	0	0	0	1	0	3	X	7

==== Draw 5 ====
Sunday, January 25, 2:30 pm

Sheet C	1	2	3	4	5	6	7	8	9	10	Final
Manitoba (Peterson)	0	2	0	1	0	2	1	0	1	0	7
Quebec (Gagné) 🔨	1	0	1	0	4	0	0	2	0	4	12

Sheet E	1	2	3	4	5	6	7	8	9	10	Final
Alberta (Rocque) 🔨	2	0	0	1	0	3	2	2	X	X	10
Ontario (Brandwood)	0	0	1	0	2	0	0	0	X	X	3

==== Draw 6 ====
Sunday, January 25, 7:00 pm

Sheet G	1	2	3	4	5	6	7	8	9	10	Final
Yukon (Horte) 🔨	0	1	0	0	0	1	1	0	0	X	3
Northern Ontario (Burns)	0	0	3	1	2	0	0	1	2	X	9

==== Draw 7 ====
Monday, January 26, 10:00 am

Sheet D	1	2	3	4	5	6	7	8	9	10	Final
Nunavut (Pinksen)	0	1	0	1	1	0	0	0	X	X	3
Alberta (Rocque) 🔨	5	0	5	0	0	3	1	1	X	X	15

Sheet E	1	2	3	4	5	6	7	8	9	10	Final
Quebec (Gagné)	0	1	2	0	0	0	1	0	3	X	7
Northern Ontario (Burns) 🔨	1	0	0	0	1	0	0	1	0	X	3

==== Draw 8 ====
Monday, January 26, 2:30 pm

Sheet B	1	2	3	4	5	6	7	8	9	10	Final
Nunavut (Pinksen)	0	1	0	1	0	0	0	1	X	X	3
Northern Ontario (Burns) 🔨	3	0	2	0	5	1	1	0	X	X	12

Sheet F	1	2	3	4	5	6	7	8	9	10	Final
Ontario (Brandwood)	5	0	1	0	0	1	0	2	0	1	10
Yukon (Horte) 🔨	0	1	0	3	1	0	1	0	1	0	7

Sheet G	1	2	3	4	5	6	7	8	9	10	Final
Alberta (Rocque)	0	0	2	0	2	0	1	0	0	2	7
Quebec (Gagné) 🔨	0	1	0	1	0	1	0	2	1	0	6

==== Draw 9 ====
Monday, January 26, 7:00 pm

Sheet D	1	2	3	4	5	6	7	8	9	10	Final
Ontario (Brandwood)	0	0	2	0	2	2	0	0	2	X	8
Manitoba (Peterson) 🔨	0	0	0	1	0	0	1	1	0	X	3

==== Draw 10 ====
Tuesday, January 27, 10:00 am

Sheet B	1	2	3	4	5	6	7	8	9	10	Final
Manitoba (Peterson)	0	0	1	1	0	3	3	3	1	X	12
Yukon (Horte) 🔨	2	1	0	0	2	0	0	0	0	X	5

==== Draw 11 ====
Tuesday, January 27, 2:30 pm

Sheet C	1	2	3	4	5	6	7	8	9	10	Final
Alberta (Rocque)	0	0	2	0	2	0	4	0	1	X	9
Northern Ontario (Burns) 🔨	1	1	0	1	0	2	0	1	0	X	6

Sheet H	1	2	3	4	5	6	7	8	9	10	Final
Quebec (Gagné)	0	1	0	4	0	1	3	1	0	X	10
Nunavut (Pinksen) 🔨	1	0	2	0	2	0	0	0	1	X	6

=== Pool B ===
==== Draw 1 ====
Saturday, January 24, 10:00 am

Sheet G	1	2	3	4	5	6	7	8	9	10	11	Final
Prince Edward Island (Smith)	2	0	2	0	1	0	2	0	0	1	0	8
British Columbia (Brown) 🔨	0	2	0	3	0	1	0	1	1	0	1	9

Sheet H	1	2	3	4	5	6	7	8	9	10	Final
Northwest Territories (McKay-Saturnino)	0	0	1	0	0	1	0	1	X	X	3
Nova Scotia (Fay) 🔨	2	1	0	1	2	0	2	0	X	X	8

==== Draw 2 ====
Saturday, January 24, 2:30 pm

Sheet C	1	2	3	4	5	6	7	8	9	10	Final
Saskatchewan (Streifel) 🔨	0	0	1	0	3	1	1	0	3	X	9
Newfoundland and Labrador (Hill)	1	2	0	3	0	0	0	1	0	X	7

==== Draw 3 ====
Saturday, January 24, 7:30 pm

Sheet D	1	2	3	4	5	6	7	8	9	10	Final
Prince Edward Island (Smith)	0	0	4	0	0	0	3	0	2	1	10
Newfoundland and Labrador (Hill) 🔨	0	3	0	2	2	0	0	1	0	0	8

Sheet E	1	2	3	4	5	6	7	8	9	10	Final
Nova Scotia (Fay) 🔨	0	0	3	0	1	0	1	0	1	0	6
British Columbia (Brown)	2	3	0	1	0	1	0	0	0	1	8

Sheet G	1	2	3	4	5	6	7	8	9	10	Final
Saskatchewan (Streifel)	0	1	1	2	0	1	0	1	0	2	8
New Brunswick (Comeau) 🔨	2	0	0	0	2	0	1	0	1	0	6

==== Draw 4 ====
Sunday, January 25, 10:00 am

Sheet F	1	2	3	4	5	6	7	8	9	10	11	Final
New Brunswick (Comeau) 🔨	0	1	0	2	1	0	0	0	1	1	0	6
Northwest Territories (McKay-Saturnino)	0	0	1	0	0	3	0	2	0	0	1	7

==== Draw 5 ====
Sunday, January 25, 2:30 pm

Sheet A	1	2	3	4	5	6	7	8	9	10	Final
Newfoundland and Labrador (Hill)	0	0	1	0	0	0	2	0	X	X	3
British Columbia (Brown)🔨	2	1	0	3	2	3	0	1	X	X	12

Sheet B	1	2	3	4	5	6	7	8	9	10	Final
Saskatchewan (Streifel)	0	1	0	1	0	0	0	1	1	1	5
Prince Edward Island (Smith) 🔨	1	0	1	0	0	1	1	0	0	0	4

==== Draw 6 ====
Sunday, January 25, 7:00 pm

Sheet C	1	2	3	4	5	6	7	8	9	10	Final
Prince Edward Island (Smith) 🔨	2	0	0	3	0	0	0	2	0	X	7
Northwest Territories (McKay-Saturnino)	0	0	1	0	2	0	0	0	0	X	3

Sheet D	1	2	3	4	5	6	7	8	9	10	Final
Nova Scotia (Fay)	0	1	1	0	2	0	1	1	0	0	6
New Brunswick (Comeau) 🔨	3	0	0	2	0	1	0	0	1	1	8

Sheet F	1	2	3	4	5	6	7	8	9	10	Final
British Columbia (Brown)	0	1	0	0	3	2	0	3	X	X	9
Saskatchewan (Streifel) 🔨	0	0	1	1	0	0	1	0	X	X	3

==== Draw 7 ====
Monday, January 26, 10:00 am

Sheet G	1	2	3	4	5	6	7	8	9	10	Final
Newfoundland and Labrador (Hill)	0	1	0	0	1	0	1	0	X	X	3
Nova Scotia (Fay) 🔨	2	0	4	1	0	2	0	2	X	X	11

==== Draw 8 ====
Monday, January 26, 2:30 pm

Sheet D	1	2	3	4	5	6	7	8	9	10	Final
Northwest Territories (McKay-Saturnino) 🔨	1	0	0	0	0	1	0	1	X	X	3
Saskatchewan (Streifel)	0	0	2	6	2	0	2	0	X	X	12

Sheet E	1	2	3	4	5	6	7	8	9	10	Final
New Brunswick (Comeau) 🔨	0	1	3	0	0	2	0	2	0	0	8
Prince Edward Island (Smith)	0	0	0	1	1	0	1	0	3	1	7

==== Draw 9 ====
Monday, January 26, 7:00 pm

Sheet A	1	2	3	4	5	6	7	8	9	10	Final
Prince Edward Island (Smith) 🔨	0	0	0	0	1	0	0	2	1	X	4
Nova Scotia (Fay)	0	1	1	2	0	1	1	0	0	X	6

Sheet B	1	2	3	4	5	6	7	8	9	10	Final
British Columbia (Brown)	0	1	1	2	0	3	1	0	0	X	8
Northwest Territories (McKay-Saturnino) 🔨	1	0	0	0	1	0	0	1	0	X	3

Sheet G	1	2	3	4	5	6	7	8	9	10	Final
New Brunswick (Comeau) 🔨	1	0	0	0	1	0	2	0	1	3	8
Newfoundland and Labrador (Hill)	0	0	0	2	0	1	0	3	0	0	6

==== Draw 10 ====
Tuesday, January 21, 10:00 pm

Sheet A	1	2	3	4	5	6	7	8	9	10	Final
British Columbia (Brown) 🔨	2	0	0	2	0	2	0	1	1	X	8
New Brunswick (Comeau)	0	1	0	0	2	0	1	0	0	X	4

==== Draw 11 ====
Tuesday, January 27, 2:30 pm

Sheet A	1	2	3	4	5	6	7	8	9	10	Final
Nova Scotia (Fay) 🔨	1	0	1	0	0	1	0	0	0	2	5
Saskatchewan (Streifel)	0	2	0	1	0	0	0	1	0	0	4

Sheet D	1	2	3	4	5	6	7	8	9	10	Final
Newfoundland and Labrador (Hill)	0	2	1	0	3	1	2	0	X	X	9
Northwest Territories (McKay-Saturnino) 🔨	2	0	0	1	0	0	0	2	X	X	5

== Placement Round ==
=== Seeding Pool ===
==== Standings ====
Final round-robin standings

Province	Skip	W	L
Prince Edward Island	Veronica Smith	5	4
Northern Ontario	Krysta Burns	3	6
Yukon	Bailey Horte	3	6
Northwest Territories	Carina McKay-Saturnino	3	6
Newfoundland and Labrador	Sarah Hill	2	7
Nunavut	Sadie Pinksen	0	9

===== Draw 1 =====
Tuesday, January 27, 7:00 pm

Sheet D	1	2	3	4	5	6	7	8	9	10	Final
Yukon (Horte)	0	0	0	1	0	1	1	0	2	X	5
Northwest Territories (McKay-Saturnino) 🔨	0	1	0	0	1	0	0	1	0	X	3

Sheet E	1	2	3	4	5	6	7	8	9	10	Final
Prince Edward Island (Smith) 🔨	1	1	1	4	0	1	0	2	X	X	10
Nunavut (Pinksen)	0	0	0	0	2	0	2	0	X	X	4

===== Draw 2 =====
Wednesday, January 28, 2:30 pm

Sheet B	1	2	3	4	5	6	7	8	9	10	Final
Northwest Territories (McKay-Saturnino) 🔨	1	1	0	5	1	0	4	0	X	X	12
Nunavut (Pinksen)	0	0	2	0	0	2	0	1	X	X	5

Sheet H	1	2	3	4	5	6	7	8	9	10	Final
Northern Ontario (Burns)	0	4	0	1	0	1	0	4	0	1	11
Newfoundland and Labrador (Hill) 🔨	1	0	2	0	2	0	1	0	2	0	8

===== Draw 3 =====
Wednesday, January 28, 7:00 pm

Sheet D	1	2	3	4	5	6	7	8	9	10	11	Final
Prince Edward Island (Smith) 🔨	0	0	1	0	0	0	1	1	2	0	1	6
Northern Ontario (Burns)	0	1	0	1	0	2	0	0	0	1	0	5

Sheet E	1	2	3	4	5	6	7	8	9	10	Final
Newfoundland and Labrador (Hill)	2	0	4	0	0	0	0	1	0	0	7
Yukon (Horte) 🔨	0	1	0	1	2	1	1	0	2	1	9

===== Draw 4 =====
Friday, January 30, 12:30 pm

Sheet A	1	2	3	4	5	6	7	8	9	10	11	Final
Northern Ontario (Burns)	1	0	1	0	1	0	2	0	0	2	0	7
Northwest Territories (McKay-Saturnino) 🔨	0	1	0	1	0	1	0	2	2	0	1	8

Sheet B	1	2	3	4	5	6	7	8	9	10	Final
Yukon (Horte)	0	1	0	0	0	2	0	1	1	0	5
Prince Edward Island (Smith) 🔨	1	0	0	3	1	0	1	0	0	1	7

Sheet C	1	2	3	4	5	6	7	8	9	10	Final
Nunavut (Pinksen)	0	0	1	1	0	0	1	0	X	X	3
Newfoundland and Labrador (Hill) 🔨	3	1	0	0	1	1	0	3	X	X	9

=== Championship Pool Standings ===
Final round-robin standings

Key
Teams to Playoffs

Province	Skip	W	L
Alberta	Kelsey Rocque	9	1
Ontario	Chelsea Brandwood	7	3
British Columbia	Corryn Brown	7	3
Nova Scotia	Mary Fay	6	4
Manitoba	Beth Peterson	6	4
New Brunswick	Justine Comeau	6	4
Saskatchewan	Kristen Streifel	6	4
Quebec	Émilia Gagné	4	6

=== Draw 1 ===
Wednesday, January 28, 10:00am

Sheet B	1	2	3	4	5	6	7	8	9	10	Final
New Brunswick (Comeau) 🔨	1	0	2	3	0	1	0	0	0	0	7
Manitoba (Peterson)	0	2	0	0	1	0	3	1	2	1	10

Sheet C	1	2	3	4	5	6	7	8	9	10	Final
Alberta (Rocque) 🔨	0	1	2	0	2	0	0	1	3	X	9
Saskatchewan (Streifel)	1	0	0	1	0	1	1	0	0	X	4

Sheet D	1	2	3	4	5	6	7	8	9	10	Final
British Columbia (Brown)	0	0	1	0	1	0	2	0	0	1	5
Quebec (Gagné) 🔨	0	1	0	1	0	1	0	1	0	0	4

=== Draw 2 ===
Wednesday, January 28, 2:30pm

Sheet D	1	2	3	4	5	6	7	8	9	10	Final
Ontario (Brandwood) 🔨	1	2	0	1	2	0	1	0	1	0	8
Saskatchewan (Streifel)	0	0	2	0	0	2	0	2	0	4	10

Sheet F	1	2	3	4	5	6	7	8	9	10	Final
British Columbia (Brown)	0	0	0	1	0	1	1	0	0	X	3
Manitoba (Peterson) 🔨	0	1	1	0	2	0	0	1	2	X	7

=== Draw 3 ===
Wednesday, January 28, 7:00pm

Sheet H	1	2	3	4	5	6	7	8	9	10	Final
Nova Scotia (Fay) 🔨	0	2	0	1	2	0	3	0	0	1	9
Quebec (Gagné)	1	0	2	0	0	1	0	1	1	0	6

=== Draw 4 ===
Thursday, January 29, 10:00am

Sheet A	1	2	3	4	5	6	7	8	9	10	Final
Quebec (Gagné) 🔨	1	0	2	0	0	1	0	1	X	X	5
New Brunswick (Comeau)	0	4	0	1	2	0	3	0	X	X	10

Sheet C	1	2	3	4	5	6	7	8	9	10	Final
Ontario (Brandwood)	0	0	2	0	3	0	0	2	0	2	9
British Columbia (Brown) 🔨	0	1	0	3	0	0	1	0	1	0	6

Sheet E	1	2	3	4	5	6	7	8	9	10	11	Final
Manitoba (Peterson)	0	0	1	0	1	0	1	2	0	0	1	6
Saskatchewan (Streifel) 🔨	0	1	0	1	0	2	0	0	0	1	0	5

=== Draw 5 ===
Thursday, January 29, 2:30pm

Sheet A	1	2	3	4	5	6	7	8	9	10	Final
Nova Scotia (Fay) 🔨	1	0	1	0	3	0	1	1	1	X	8
Manitoba (Peterson)	0	0	0	1	0	2	0	0	0	X	3

Sheet B	1	2	3	4	5	6	7	8	9	10	Final
Alberta (Rocque) 🔨	0	1	0	2	0	1	0	0	0	1	5
British Columbia (Brown)	0	0	1	0	1	0	1	1	0	0	4

=== Draw 6 ===
Thursday, January 29, 7:00pm

Sheet C	1	2	3	4	5	6	7	8	9	10	Final
Saskatchewan (Streifel)	1	0	1	0	1	0	0	2	0	3	8
Quebec (Gagné) 🔨	0	1	0	2	0	2	1	0	1	0	7

Sheet D	1	2	3	4	5	6	7	8	9	10	Final
Alberta (Rocque) 🔨	3	0	0	1	1	0	0	3	X	X	8
Nova Scotia (Fay)	0	1	0	0	0	0	2	0	X	X	3

Sheet E	1	2	3	4	5	6	7	8	9	10	11	Final
New Brunswick (Comeau) 🔨	0	3	0	1	0	3	0	0	0	0	2	9
Ontario (Brandwood)	2	0	0	0	1	0	0	2	1	1	0	7

=== Draw 7 ===
Friday, January 30, 8:30am

Sheet B	1	2	3	4	5	6	7	8	9	10	11	Final
Nova Scotia (Fay) 🔨	0	1	0	1	0	1	0	1	1	1	0	6
Ontario (Brandwood)	0	0	2	0	1	0	3	0	0	0	1	7

Sheet D	1	2	3	4	5	6	7	8	9	10	11	Final
Alberta (Rocque)	0	1	0	1	0	0	1	1	0	3	0	7
New Brunswick (Comeau) 🔨	1	0	2	0	1	1	0	0	2	0	1	8

=== Playoffs ===
Semifinal			Final
			1	Alberta	8
2	Ontario	9	2	Ontario	2
3	British Columbia	4

==== Semifinal ====
Saturday, January 31, 1:30 pm

Team	1	2	3	4	5	6	7	8	9	10	Final
Ontario (Brandwood) 🔨	0	1	0	1	0	1	0	3	3	X	9
British Columbia (Brown)	0	0	1	0	2	0	1	0	0	X	4

==== Final ====
Saturday, January 31, 8:00 pm

Team	1	2	3	4	5	6	7	8	9	10	Final
Alberta (Rocque) 🔨	0	1	0	2	0	1	0	2	2	X	8
Ontario (Brandwood)	0	0	1	0	0	0	1	0	0	X	2

2015 Canadian Junior Women's Curling Champions
(Alberta)
Alberta
8th Junior Women's National Championship title
