= 2026 Scotties Tournament of Hearts =

Canada's women's curling championship

- Host city: Mississauga, Ontario
- Arena: Paramount Fine Foods Centre
- Dates: January 23 – February 1
- Attendance: 63,580
- Winner: Canada
- Curling club: Gimli CC, Gimli
- Skip: Kerri Einarson
- Third: Val Sweeting
- Second: Shannon Birchard
- Lead: Karlee Burgess
- Alternate: Krysten Karwacki
- Coach: Reid Carruthers
- Finalist: Manitoba (Kaitlyn Lawes)

The 2026 Scotties Tournament of Hearts, Canada's national women's curling championship, was held from January 23 to February 1 at the Paramount Fine Foods Centre in Mississauga, Ontario. The winning Kerri Einarson team will represent Canada at the 2026 World Women's Curling Championship at the Markin MacPhail Centre at Canada Olympic Park in Calgary, Alberta.

Defending champion Rachel Homan was not allowed to participate by Curling Canada due to qualifying for the 2026 Winter Olympics and scheduling of the 2026 Scotties. As a result, Kerri Einarson, who finished as runner-up in the 2025 tournament, became Team Canada for the event.

This was the first Canadian women's curling championship to be held in the Greater Toronto Area.

== Teams ==
A total of eighteen teams qualified for the 2026 Scotties. The fourteen Canadian curling member associations held playdowns to determine who would represent their province or territory. Team Canada is represented by Team Kerri Einarson, who replaces Team Rachel Homan following their victory at the 2025 Canadian Olympic Curling Trials.

In a continuation of the 2025 qualifying format, the final three teams in the field pre-qualified for the 2026 Scotties based on their 2024–25 Canadian Team Ranking Standings, which meant they bypassed the provincial qualifiers. These spots initially went to Teams Kerri Einarson, Kayla Skrlik and Christina Black. However, with Team Einarson becoming Team Canada, the third CTRS spot was instead given to the highest ranked non-qualified team following the completion of all provincial and territorial championships, Team Kaitlyn Lawes.

The teams are listed as follows:

Canada	Alberta (Sturmay)	British Columbia
Gimli CC, Gimli Skip: Kerri Einarson; Third: Val Sweeting; Second: Shannon Birchard; Lead: Karlee Burgess (Note: Team Canada alternate Krysten Karwacki threw lead stones in the final end of Draw 7 and the final two ends of Draw 13.); Alternate: Krysten Karwacki	Saville Community SC, Edmonton Skip: Selena Sturmay; Third: Danielle Schmiemann; Second: Dezaray Hawes; Lead: Paige Papley	Victoria CC, Victoria Skip: Taylor Reese-Hansen; Third: Megan McGillivray; Second: Kim Bonneau; Lead: Julianna MacKenzie
Manitoba (Peterson)	New Brunswick	Newfoundland and Labrador
Assiniboine Memorial CC, Winnipeg Skip: Kelsey Calvert (Note: Kelsey Calvert skipped Team Manitoba (Peterson).); Third: Beth Peterson; Second: Katherine Remillard; Lead: Melissa Gordon-Kurz	Capital WC, Fredericton Skip: Mélodie Forsythe; Third: Rebecca Watson; Second: Carly Smith; Lead: Jenna Campbell	St. John's CC, St. John's Skip: Mackenzie Mitchell; Third: Jessica Wiseman; Second: Kristina Adams; Lead: Stacie Curtis
Northern Ontario	Nova Scotia (Stevens)	Ontario
Fort William CC, Thunder Bay Skip: Krista Scharf; Third: Ashley Sippala; Second: Kendra Lilly; Lead: Sarah Potts (Note: Team Northern Ontario alternate Bella McCarville threw lead stones in the last end of Draw 12.); Alternate: Bella McCarville	Halifax CC, Halifax Skip: Taylour Stevens; Third: Maria Fitzgerald; Second: Alison Umlah; Lead: Cate Fitzgerald	Whitby CC, Whitby Skip: Hailey Armstrong; Third: Grace Lloyd; Second: Michaela Robert; Lead: Rachel Steele; Alternate: Lori Eddy
Prince Edward Island	Quebec	Saskatchewan
Summerside CC, Summerside Skip: Amanda Power; Third: Veronica Mayne; Second: Emily Best; Lead: Sabrina Smith	CC Kénogami, Jonquière Skip: Jolianne Fortin; Third: Emy Lafrance; Second: Megan Lafrance; Lead: Mégane Fortin	Highland CC, Regina Skip: Jolene Campbell; Third: Robyn Silvernagle; Second: Rachel Big Eagle; Lead: Dayna Demmans; Alternate: Callan Hamon
Northwest Territories	Nunavut	Yukon
Yellowknife CC, Yellowknife Skip: Nicky Kaufman; Third: Megan Koehler (Note: For the final three ends of Draw 11, Team Northwest Territories alternate Brynn Chorostkowski threw lead stones, lead Ella Skauge threw second stones, second Sydney Galusha threw third stones.); Second: Sydney Galusha (Note: For the last three ends of Draw 13, Team Northwest Territories alternate Brynn Chorostkowski threw lead stones while lead Ella Skauge threw second stones.); Lead: Ella Skauge; Alternate: Brynn Chorostkowski	Iqaluit CC, Iqaluit Skip: Julia Weagle; Third: Sadie Pinksen; Second: Leigh Gustafson; Lead: Alison Taylor	Whitehorse CC, Whitehorse Skip: Bayly Scoffin; Third: Raelyn Helston; Second: Patty Wallingham; Lead: Bailey Horvey; Alternate: Shelby Jensen
Alberta (Skrlik)	Nova Scotia (Black)	Manitoba (Lawes)
Garrison CC, Calgary Skip: Kayla Skrlik; Third: Margot Flemming; Second: Ashton Skrlik; Lead: Geri-Lynn Ramsay; Alternate: Crystal Rumberg	Halifax CC, Halifax Skip: Christina Black; Third: Jill Brothers; Second: Jenn Baxter (Note: Team Nova Scotia (Black) used a front-end rotation.); Lead: Karlee Everist; Alternate: Marlee Powers	Heather CC, Winnipeg Fourth: Kaitlyn Lawes (Note: Selena Njegovan skipped Team Manitoba (Lawes).); Skip: Selena Njegovan; Second: Laura Walker (Note: Team Manitoba (Lawes) alternate Erin Pincott threw second stones in the last end of Draws 3 and 7.); Lead: Kristin Gordon; Alternate: Erin Pincott

=== CTRS Rankings ===
As of January 12, 2026

Member Association (Skip)	Rank	Points
Canada (Einarson)	2	181.600
British Columbia (Reese-Hansen)	3	163.950
Manitoba (Lawes)	4	151.450
Nova Scotia (Black)	6	128.088
Alberta (Sturmay)	9	97.650
Manitoba (Peterson)	10	96.138
Ontario (Armstrong)	13	89.313
Saskatchewan (Campbell)	15	72.875
Northern Ontario (Scharf)	27	58.275
Alberta (Skrlik)	28	50.888
New Brunswick (Forsythe)	35	34.525
Nova Scotia (Stevens)	47	25.813
Northwest Territories (Kaufman)	66	12.075
Newfoundland and Labrador (Mitchell)	67	12.000
Prince Edward Island (Power)	74	9.375
Quebec (Fortin)	83	6.900
Yukon (Scoffin)	104	2.625
Nunavut (Weagle)	NR	0.000

== Map of teams ==
Team Canada Pre-Qualified Teams Provincial Winners Wild Card

== Wild card selection ==
Originally, three pre qualified berths were allocated to the top teams in the Canadian Team Ranking System (CTRS) from the previous curling season. These three pre qualified teams were Team Kerri Einarson, Team Kayla Skrlik, and Team Christina Black. However due to Team Rachel Homan withdrawing from the Scotties to focus on the Olympics. Kerri Einarson became team Canada, leaving an additional pre qualified spot up for grabs. Curling Canada announced that the highest ranked Canadian Team Ranking System (CTRS) that did not qualify for the scotties will be given the spot following the conclusion of all provincial/territorial championships. The final berth was given to the team with the highest CTRS ranking on January 12, 2026, who did not win their provincial/territorial championship.

CTRS standings for Wild Card selection
Rank	Team	CTRS Points	Member Association	Eligibility
1	~~Rachel Homan~~	411.900	Ontario	Withdrew from tournament
2	~~Kerri Einarson~~	181.600	Manitoba	Qualified as Team Canada (ineligible)
3	~~Taylor Reese-Hansen~~	163.950	British Columbia	Won British Columbia provincials
4	Kaitlyn Lawes	151.450	Manitoba	Eliminated from provincials
5	Serena Gray-Withers	151.225	Alberta	Eliminated from provincials

== Round robin standings ==
Final Round Robin Standings

Key
Teams to Championship Round

Pool A	Skip	W	L	W–L	PF	PA	EW	EL	BE	SE	S%	LSD
Manitoba (Lawes)	Selena Njegovan	8	0	–	74	32	38	23	6	15	86%	49.00
Canada	Kerri Einarson	7	1	–	73	41	37	28	3	9	86%	23.75
Nova Scotia (Stevens)	Taylour Stevens	6	2	–	68	50	37	31	1	11	80%	35.41
Ontario	Hailey Armstrong	5	3	–	57	47	39	29	4	13	84%	40.24
Saskatchewan	Jolene Campbell	3	5	1–0	41	59	28	38	5	6	80%	36.79
British Columbia	Taylor Reese-Hansen	3	5	0–1	58	57	33	36	2	6	80%	27.61
Northwest Territories	Nicky Kaufman	2	6	1–0	40	64	29	33	3	6	73%	64.56
Quebec	Jolianne Fortin	2	6	0–1	45	59	30	34	6	8	81%	34.33
Yukon	Bayly Scoffin	0	8	–	31	78	23	42	2	1	73%	42.71

Pool B	Skip	W	L	W–L	PF	PA	EW	EL	BE	SE	S%	LSD
Manitoba (Peterson)	Kelsey Calvert	8	0	–	69	36	40	28	6	11	84%	21.10
Nova Scotia (Black)	Christina Black	6	2	1–0	59	33	39	27	5	14	84%	27.23
Alberta (Sturmay)	Selena Sturmay	6	2	0–1	80	43	36	30	4	10	82%	42.40
Northern Ontario	Krista Scharf	5	3	1–0	53	53	31	33	2	8	81%	31.70
Alberta (Skrlik)	Kayla Skrlik	5	3	0–1	58	42	37	26	6	15	82%	38.35
Prince Edward Island	Amanda Power	2	6	1–0	41	61	28	38	2	4	71%	70.28
New Brunswick	Mélodie Forsythe	2	6	0–1	45	68	29	38	5	6	78%	85.92
Newfoundland and Labrador	Mackenzie Mitchell	1	7	1–0	40	68	30	35	2	10	76%	43.12
Nunavut	Julia Weagle	1	7	0–1	28	69	24	39	2	6	71%	105.17

Pool A Round Robin Summary Table
Pos.	Team	(British Columbia) BC	(Canada) CAN	(Manitoba) MB–L	(Northwest Territories) NT	(Nova Scotia) NS–S	(Ontario) ON	(Quebec) QC	(Saskatchewan) SK	(Yukon) YT	Record
6	British Columbia	—	8–9	4–10	9–3	10–11	3–7	8–5	5–8	11–4	3–5
2	Canada	9–8	—	4–9	13–2	9–6	7–6	8–2	10–4	13–4	7–1
1	Manitoba (Lawes)	10–4	9–4	—	7–4	8–2	11–6	11–4	9–4	9–4	8–0
7	Northwest Territories	3–9	2–13	4–7	—	4–10	5–9	7–5	5–6	10–5	2–6
3	Nova Scotia (Stevens)	11–10	6–9	2–8	10–4	—	9–7	10–7	11–3	9–2	6–2
4	Ontario	7–3	6–7	6–11	9–5	7–9	—	8–5	8–4	6–3	5–3
8	Quebec	5–8	2–8	4–11	5–7	7–10	5–8	—	7–2	10–5	2–6
5	Saskatchewan	8–5	4–10	4–9	6–5	3–11	4–8	2–7	—	10–4	3–5
9	Yukon	4–11	4–13	4–9	5–10	2–9	3–6	5–10	4–10	—	0–8

Pool B Round Robin Summary Table
Pos.	Team	(Alberta) AB–Sk	(Alberta) AB–St	(Manitoba) MB–P	(New Brunswick) NB	(Newfoundland and Labrador) NL	(Northern Ontario) NO	(Nova Scotia) NS–B	(Nunavut) NU	(Prince Edward Island) PE	Record
5	Alberta (Skrlik)	—	5–9	4–8	9–3	10–4	4–7	7–5	9–2	10–4	5–3
3	Alberta (Sturmay)	9–5	—	5–7	12–6	11–6	15–5	6–9	10–2	12–3	6–2
1	Manitoba (Peterson)	8–4	7–5	—	13–3	7–5	9–2	7–6	10–4	8–7	8–0
7	New Brunswick	3–9	6–12	3–13	—	9–6	4–9	4–7	10–5	6–7	2–6
8	Newfoundland and Labrador	4–10	6–11	5–7	6–9	—	5–12	1–9	8–2	5–8	1–7
4	Northern Ontario	7–4	5–15	2–9	9–4	12–5	—	4–8	8–4	6–4	5–3
2	Nova Scotia (Black)	5–7	9–6	6–7	7–4	9–1	8–4	—	9–1	6–3	6–2
9	Nunavut	2–9	2–10	4–10	5–10	2–8	4–8	1–9	—	8–5	1–7
6	Prince Edward Island	4–10	3–12	7–8	7–6	8–5	4–6	3–6	5–8	—	2–6

== Round robin results ==
All draw times are listed in Eastern Time (UTC−05:00).

=== Draw 1 ===
Friday, January 23, 7:00 pm

Sheet A	1	2	3	4	5	6	7	8	9	10	Final
Yukon (Scoffin)	0	1	0	0	2	0	1	0	X	X	4
Canada (Einarson) 🔨	3	0	3	1	0	3	0	3	X	X	13

Sheet B	1	2	3	4	5	6	7	8	9	10	Final
Ontario (Armstrong) 🔨	1	2	0	3	0	0	2	0	1	X	9
Northwest Territories (Kaufman)	0	0	1	0	3	0	0	1	0	X	5

Sheet C	1	2	3	4	5	6	7	8	9	10	Final
Manitoba (Lawes) 🔨	3	1	0	1	0	2	0	3	X	X	10
British Columbia (Reese-Hansen)	0	0	2	0	1	0	1	0	X	X	4

Sheet D	1	2	3	4	5	6	7	8	9	10	Final
Quebec (Fortin)	0	3	2	0	1	0	1	0	0	X	7
Nova Scotia (Stevens) 🔨	1	0	0	1	0	4	0	1	3	X	10

=== Draw 2 ===
Saturday, January 24, 2:00 pm

Sheet A	1	2	3	4	5	6	7	8	9	10	Final
Nunavut (Weagle)	0	0	0	0	0	0	1	0	X	X	1
Nova Scotia (Black) 🔨	1	0	2	1	1	1	0	3	X	X	9

Sheet B	1	2	3	4	5	6	7	8	9	10	Final
Alberta (Sturmay) 🔨	2	0	3	2	1	0	4	0	X	X	12
Prince Edward Island (Power)	0	1	0	0	0	1	0	1	X	X	3

Sheet C	1	2	3	4	5	6	7	8	9	10	Final
Northern Ontario (Scharf) 🔨	1	0	0	1	0	1	0	0	2	2	7
Alberta (Skrlik)	0	0	1	0	0	0	1	2	0	0	4

Sheet D	1	2	3	4	5	6	7	8	9	10	Final
Newfoundland and Labrador (Mitchell)	0	0	2	0	0	0	0	1	2	0	5
Manitoba (Peterson) 🔨	0	3	0	1	1	0	1	0	0	1	7

=== Draw 3 ===
Saturday, January 24, 7:00 pm

Sheet A	1	2	3	4	5	6	7	8	9	10	Final
Nova Scotia (Stevens) 🔨	1	0	1	1	0	2	0	2	4	X	11
Saskatchewan (Campbell)	0	1	0	0	1	0	1	0	0	X	3

Sheet B	1	2	3	4	5	6	7	8	9	10	Final
Manitoba (Lawes) 🔨	0	3	2	0	1	0	2	0	3	X	11
Quebec (Fortin)	0	0	0	2	0	1	0	1	0	X	4

Sheet C	1	2	3	4	5	6	7	8	9	10	Final
Ontario (Armstrong)	1	0	2	0	2	0	1	0	0	0	6
Canada (Einarson) 🔨	0	1	0	2	0	2	0	0	0	2	7

Sheet D	1	2	3	4	5	6	7	8	9	10	Final
Northwest Territories (Kaufman)	1	0	1	0	4	1	0	1	2	X	10
Yukon (Scoffin) 🔨	0	2	0	2	0	0	1	0	0	X	5

=== Draw 4 ===
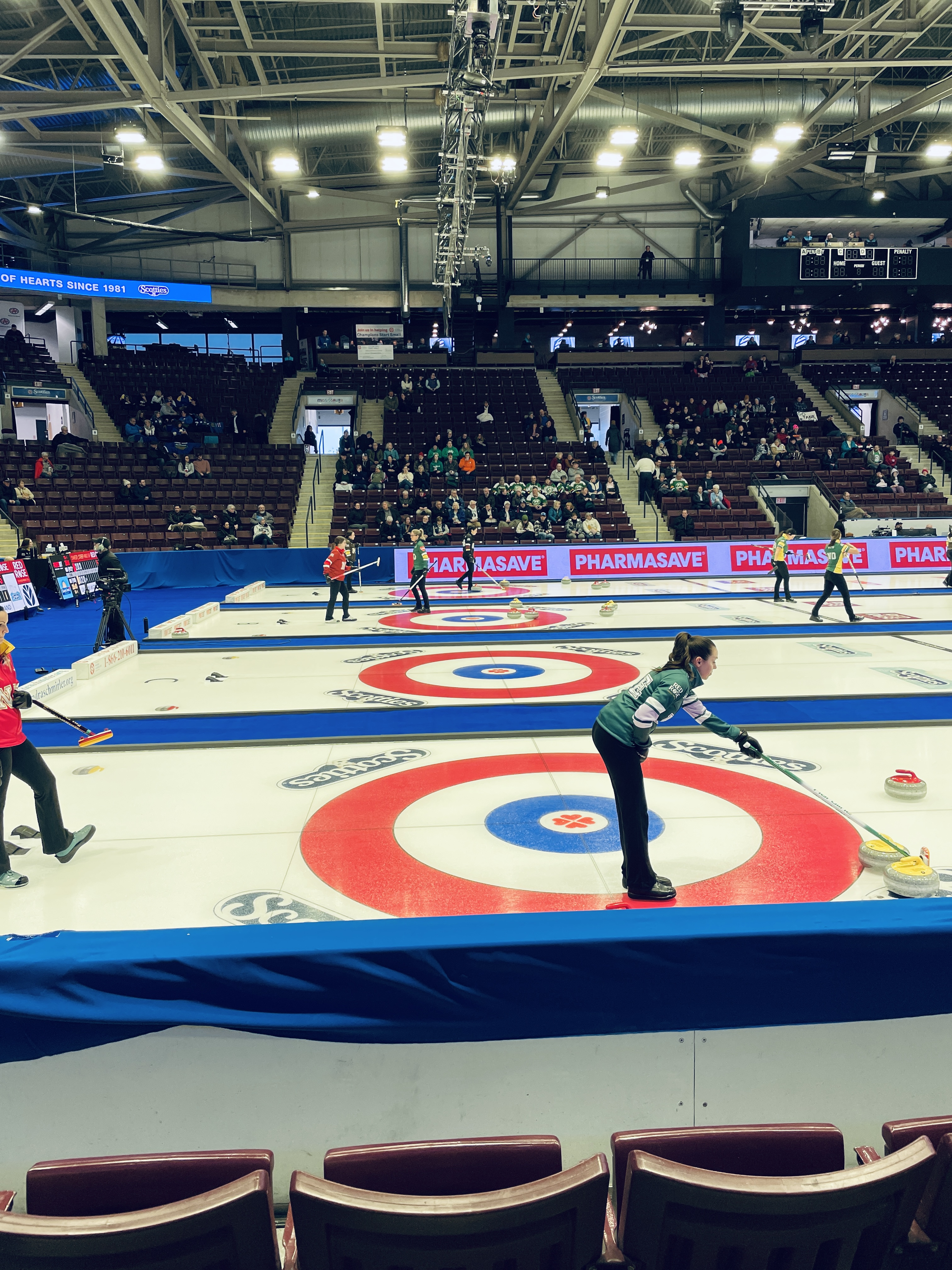
Draw 4 action

Sunday, January 25, 9:00 am

Sheet A	1	2	3	4	5	6	7	8	9	10	Final
Manitoba (Peterson) 🔨	2	0	3	0	2	0	1	5	X	X	13
New Brunswick (Forsythe)	0	2	0	1	0	0	0	0	X	X	3

Sheet B	1	2	3	4	5	6	7	8	9	10	Final
Northern Ontario (Scharf)	0	3	2	0	0	0	4	0	3	X	12
Newfoundland and Labrador (Mitchell) 🔨	1	0	0	1	1	1	0	1	0	X	5

Sheet C	1	2	3	4	5	6	7	8	9	10	Final
Alberta (Sturmay)	0	1	0	0	0	3	0	1	1	X	6
Nova Scotia (Black) 🔨	1	0	1	1	3	0	3	0	0	X	9

Sheet D	1	2	3	4	5	6	7	8	9	10	Final
Prince Edward Island (Power) 🔨	2	0	2	0	0	1	0	0	0	X	5
Nunavut (Weagle)	0	2	0	2	2	0	1	0	1	X	8

=== Draw 5 ===
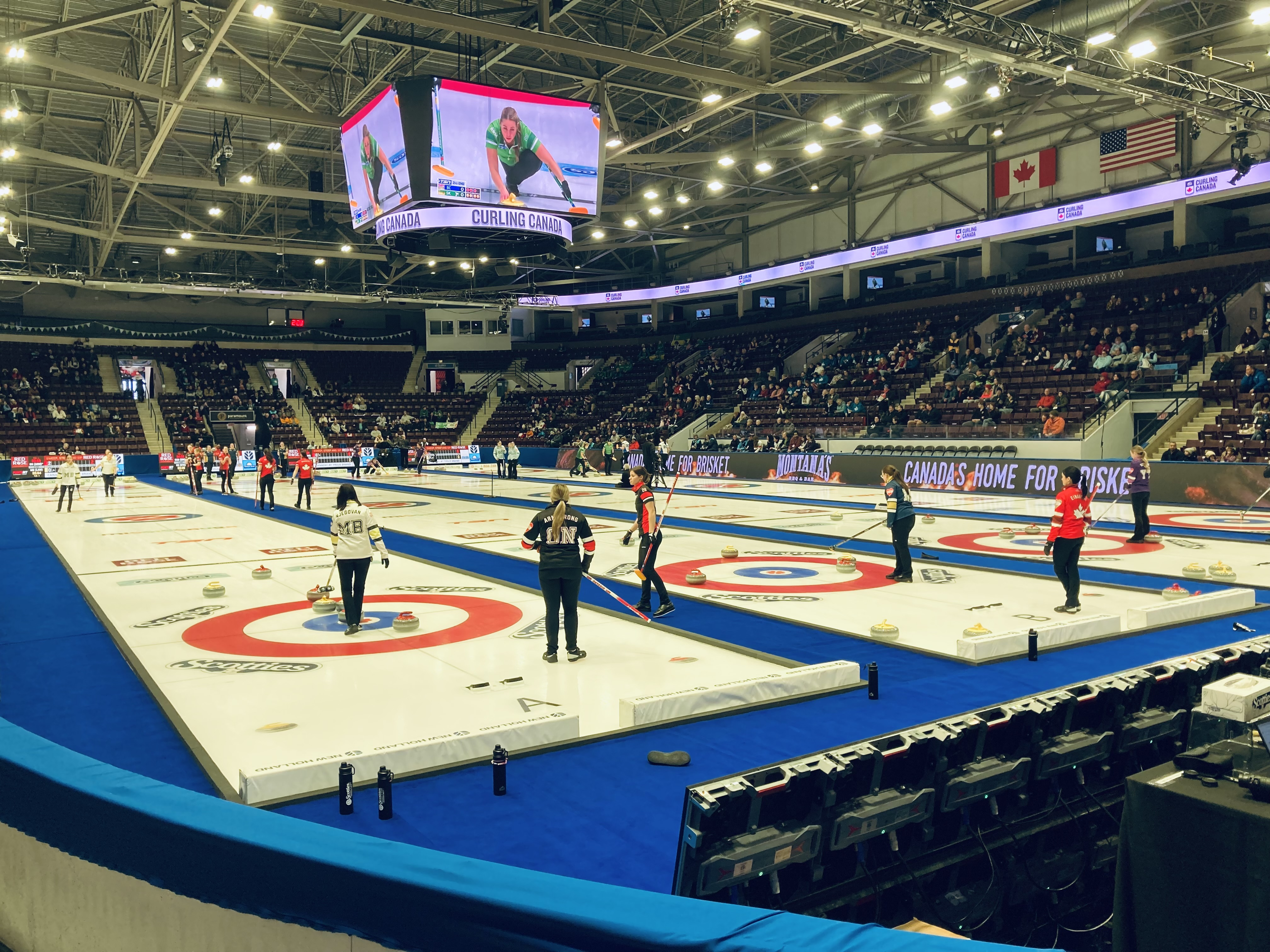
Draw 5 action

Sunday, January 25, 2:00 pm

Sheet A	1	2	3	4	5	6	7	8	9	10	Final
Ontario (Armstrong) 🔨	2	0	0	2	0	1	0	1	0	X	6
Manitoba (Lawes)	0	1	2	0	2	0	1	0	5	X	11

Sheet B	1	2	3	4	5	6	7	8	9	10	Final
Canada (Einarson) 🔨	1	0	2	0	2	0	2	0	2	X	9
Nova Scotia (Stevens)	0	1	0	2	0	2	0	1	0	X	6

Sheet C	1	2	3	4	5	6	7	8	9	10	Final
Quebec (Fortin)	0	4	1	0	1	0	3	1	X	X	10
Yukon (Scoffin) 🔨	2	0	0	1	0	2	0	0	X	X	5

Sheet D	1	2	3	4	5	6	7	8	9	10	Final
British Columbia (Reese-Hansen)	0	0	2	0	0	2	0	0	1	0	5
Saskatchewan (Campbell) 🔨	0	3	0	1	2	0	0	1	0	1	8

=== Draw 6 ===
Sunday, January 25, 7:00 pm

Sheet A	1	2	3	4	5	6	7	8	9	10	Final
Alberta (Sturmay)	0	4	1	0	4	0	1	5	X	X	15
Northern Ontario (Scharf) 🔨	1	0	0	2	0	2	0	0	X	X	5

Sheet B	1	2	3	4	5	6	7	8	9	10	11	Final
Nova Scotia (Black)	0	1	0	2	0	1	0	1	0	1	0	6
Manitoba (Peterson) 🔨	1	0	1	0	1	0	1	0	2	0	1	7

Sheet C	1	2	3	4	5	6	7	8	9	10	Final
Newfoundland and Labrador (Mitchell) 🔨	0	0	1	1	3	1	1	1	X	X	8
Nunavut (Weagle)	1	1	0	0	0	0	0	0	X	X	2

Sheet D	1	2	3	4	5	6	7	8	9	10	Final
Alberta (Skrlik) 🔨	0	1	1	1	0	3	0	3	X	X	9
New Brunswick (Forsythe)	0	0	0	0	1	0	2	0	X	X	3

=== Draw 7 ===
Monday, January 26, 9:00 am

Sheet A	1	2	3	4	5	6	7	8	9	10	Final
Canada (Einarson) 🔨	2	0	0	3	0	3	0	0	X	X	8
Quebec (Fortin)	0	1	0	0	0	0	0	1	X	X	2

Sheet B	1	2	3	4	5	6	7	8	9	10	Final
Yukon (Scoffin)	0	0	1	0	0	2	0	1	X	X	4
British Columbia (Reese-Hansen) 🔨	1	2	0	1	4	0	3	0	X	X	11

Sheet C	1	2	3	4	5	6	7	8	9	10	Final
Saskatchewan (Campbell)	0	0	0	1	0	1	0	0	2	2	6
Northwest Territories (Kaufman) 🔨	0	0	1	0	1	0	2	1	0	0	5

Sheet D	1	2	3	4	5	6	7	8	9	10	Final
Nova Scotia (Stevens)	0	0	0	0	0	2	0	0	X	X	2
Manitoba (Lawes) 🔨	0	1	1	3	2	0	0	1	X	X	8

=== Draw 8 ===
Monday, January 26, 2:00 pm

Sheet A	1	2	3	4	5	6	7	8	9	10	Final
Nova Scotia (Black) 🔨	3	0	0	1	1	1	2	1	X	X	9
Newfoundland and Labrador (Mitchell)	0	1	0	0	0	0	0	0	X	X	1

Sheet B	1	2	3	4	5	6	7	8	9	10	Final
Nunavut (Weagle) 🔨	0	1	0	0	0	1	0	0	0	X	2
Alberta (Skrlik)	2	0	0	2	1	0	2	1	1	X	9

Sheet C	1	2	3	4	5	6	7	8	9	10	Final
New Brunswick (Forsythe) 🔨	1	0	1	0	0	1	1	0	2	0	6
Prince Edward Island (Power)	0	1	0	2	1	0	0	2	0	1	7

Sheet D	1	2	3	4	5	6	7	8	9	10	Final
Manitoba (Peterson) 🔨	0	0	1	1	0	3	1	3	X	X	9
Northern Ontario (Scharf)	0	0	0	0	2	0	0	0	X	X	2

=== Draw 9 ===
Monday, January 26, 7:00 pm

Sheet A	1	2	3	4	5	6	7	8	9	10	Final
Northwest Territories (Kaufman)	0	0	0	1	0	1	0	1	0	X	3
British Columbia (Reese-Hansen) 🔨	0	3	0	0	2	0	1	0	3	X	9

Sheet B	1	2	3	4	5	6	7	8	9	10	Final
Quebec (Fortin) 🔨	0	1	0	1	2	2	0	0	1	X	7
Saskatchewan (Campbell)	0	0	0	0	0	0	1	1	0	X	2

Sheet C	1	2	3	4	5	6	7	8	9	10	Final
Canada (Einarson)	1	0	0	1	0	0	0	2	X	X	4
Manitoba (Lawes) 🔨	0	3	2	0	2	1	1	0	X	X	9

Sheet D	1	2	3	4	5	6	7	8	9	10	Final
Yukon (Scoffin)	1	0	0	1	0	0	0	0	1	0	3
Ontario (Armstrong) 🔨	0	1	1	0	0	1	0	1	0	2	6

=== Draw 10 ===
Tuesday, January 27, 9:00 am

Sheet A	1	2	3	4	5	6	7	8	9	10	Final
Prince Edward Island (Power)	0	0	0	1	0	1	0	2	0	X	4
Alberta (Skrlik) 🔨	1	3	2	0	1	0	1	0	2	X	10

Sheet B	1	2	3	4	5	6	7	8	9	10	Final
Newfoundland and Labrador (Mitchell) 🔨	0	0	2	0	3	0	0	0	1	X	6
New Brunswick (Forsythe)	1	2	0	2	0	0	3	1	0	X	9

Sheet C	1	2	3	4	5	6	7	8	9	10	Final
Nova Scotia (Black) 🔨	0	2	0	1	1	0	2	2	0	X	8
Northern Ontario (Scharf)	0	0	2	0	0	1	0	0	1	X	4

Sheet D	1	2	3	4	5	6	7	8	9	10	Final
Nunavut (Weagle)	0	0	1	0	0	1	0	0	X	X	2
Alberta (Sturmay) 🔨	0	3	0	2	0	0	4	1	X	X	10

=== Draw 11 ===
Tuesday, January 27, 2:00 pm

Sheet A	1	2	3	4	5	6	7	8	9	10	Final
Manitoba (Lawes)	3	1	1	0	2	0	2	0	X	X	9
Yukon (Scoffin) 🔨	0	0	0	1	0	2	0	1	X	X	4

Sheet B	1	2	3	4	5	6	7	8	9	10	Final
British Columbia (Reese-Hansen) 🔨	0	1	0	0	0	1	0	1	0	X	3
Ontario (Armstrong)	1	0	0	2	1	0	2	0	1	X	7

Sheet C	1	2	3	4	5	6	7	8	9	10	Final
Northwest Territories (Kaufman)	0	0	0	1	0	1	0	2	X	X	4
Nova Scotia (Stevens) 🔨	3	1	1	0	4	0	1	0	X	X	10

Sheet D	1	2	3	4	5	6	7	8	9	10	Final
Saskatchewan (Campbell) 🔨	1	0	0	0	2	0	0	1	0	X	4
Canada (Einarson)	0	2	1	1	0	2	2	0	2	X	10

=== Draw 12 ===
Tuesday, January 27, 7:00 pm

Sheet A	1	2	3	4	5	6	7	8	9	10	Final
Northern Ontario (Scharf) 🔨	1	0	0	2	0	2	1	2	0	X	8
Nunavut (Weagle)	0	1	1	0	1	0	0	0	1	X	4

Sheet B	1	2	3	4	5	6	7	8	9	10	Final
Alberta (Skrlik)	0	0	0	2	0	1	0	1	1	0	5
Alberta (Sturmay) 🔨	0	0	4	0	1	0	0	0	0	4	9

Sheet C	1	2	3	4	5	6	7	8	9	10	11	Final
Prince Edward Island (Power)	0	0	0	1	0	2	2	0	1	1	0	7
Manitoba (Peterson) 🔨	0	0	3	0	3	0	0	1	0	0	1	8

Sheet D	1	2	3	4	5	6	7	8	9	10	Final
New Brunswick (Forsythe) 🔨	0	1	0	1	0	1	0	0	1	0	4
Nova Scotia (Black)	0	0	2	0	2	0	1	1	0	1	7

=== Draw 13 ===
Wednesday, January 28, 9:00 am

Sheet A	1	2	3	4	5	6	7	8	9	10	11	Final
British Columbia (Reese-Hansen) 🔨	0	1	0	2	0	0	2	2	0	3	0	10
Nova Scotia (Stevens)	2	0	3	0	1	2	0	0	2	0	1	11

Sheet B	1	2	3	4	5	6	7	8	9	10	Final
Northwest Territories (Kaufman)	0	0	0	1	0	1	0	0	X	X	2
Canada (Einarson) 🔨	1	4	1	0	2	0	2	3	X	X	13

Sheet C	1	2	3	4	5	6	7	8	9	10	Final
Yukon (Scoffin) 🔨	1	0	0	0	1	0	2	0	0	X	4
Saskatchewan (Campbell)	0	3	0	2	0	3	0	1	1	X	10

Sheet D	1	2	3	4	5	6	7	8	9	10	11	Final
Ontario (Armstrong)	0	1	0	1	0	0	1	1	1	0	3	8
Quebec (Fortin) 🔨	1	0	0	0	1	1	0	0	0	2	0	5

=== Draw 14 ===
Wednesday, January 28, 2:00 pm

Sheet A	1	2	3	4	5	6	7	8	9	10	Final
Alberta (Skrlik) 🔨	0	1	0	0	1	0	0	2	0	0	4
Manitoba (Peterson)	0	0	0	1	0	3	1	0	1	2	8

Sheet B	1	2	3	4	5	6	7	8	9	10	Final
Prince Edward Island (Power)	0	0	1	0	1	0	0	0	1	X	3
Nova Scotia (Black) 🔨	1	2	0	1	0	0	0	2	0	X	6

Sheet C	1	2	3	4	5	6	7	8	9	10	Final
Nunavut (Weagle)	0	2	0	1	0	0	1	0	1	X	5
New Brunswick (Forsythe) 🔨	2	0	3	0	0	4	0	1	0	X	10

Sheet D	1	2	3	4	5	6	7	8	9	10	Final
Alberta (Sturmay) 🔨	2	0	2	0	3	0	2	0	2	X	11
Newfoundland and Labrador (Mitchell)	0	1	0	1	0	2	0	2	0	X	6

=== Draw 15 ===
Wednesday, January 28, 7:00 pm

Sheet A	1	2	3	4	5	6	7	8	9	10	Final
Saskatchewan (Campbell) 🔨	0	0	2	0	1	0	0	1	0	0	4
Ontario (Armstrong)	0	1	0	1	0	2	1	0	1	2	8

Sheet B	1	2	3	4	5	6	7	8	9	10	Final
Nova Scotia (Stevens)	0	1	1	1	2	0	1	3	X	X	9
Yukon (Scoffin) 🔨	1	0	0	0	0	1	0	0	X	X	2

Sheet C	1	2	3	4	5	6	7	8	9	10	Final
British Columbia (Reese-Hansen)	0	3	1	2	0	1	0	0	0	1	8
Quebec (Fortin) 🔨	1	0	0	0	1	0	2	0	1	0	5

Sheet D	1	2	3	4	5	6	7	8	9	10	Final
Manitoba (Lawes) 🔨	0	3	0	0	3	0	0	1	0	X	7
Northwest Territories (Kaufman)	0	0	1	0	0	2	0	0	1	X	4

=== Draw 16 ===
Thursday, January 29, 9:00 am

Sheet A	1	2	3	4	5	6	7	8	9	10	Final
New Brunswick (Forsythe) 🔨	0	1	0	0	0	2	1	0	2	0	6
Alberta (Sturmay)	1	0	2	0	1	0	0	1	0	7	12

Sheet B	1	2	3	4	5	6	7	8	9	10	Final
Manitoba (Peterson) 🔨	3	3	0	0	1	0	1	0	2	X	10
Nunavut (Weagle)	0	0	1	1	0	1	0	1	0	X	4

Sheet C	1	2	3	4	5	6	7	8	9	10	Final
Alberta (Skrlik) 🔨	2	0	2	2	1	0	3	0	X	X	10
Newfoundland and Labrador (Mitchell)	0	1	0	0	0	1	0	2	X	X	4

Sheet D	1	2	3	4	5	6	7	8	9	10	Final
Northern Ontario (Scharf) 🔨	0	2	0	0	1	0	0	2	0	1	6
Prince Edward Island (Power)	0	0	1	0	0	0	1	0	2	0	4

=== Draw 17 ===
Thursday, January 29, 2:00 pm

Sheet A	1	2	3	4	5	6	7	8	9	10	Final
Quebec (Fortin) 🔨	1	0	0	1	0	0	0	3	0	0	5
Northwest Territories (Kaufman)	0	1	1	0	3	0	0	0	1	1	7

Sheet B	1	2	3	4	5	6	7	8	9	10	Final
Saskatchewan (Campbell) 🔨	0	1	0	2	1	0	0	0	0	0	4
Manitoba (Lawes)	1	0	2	0	0	2	0	0	2	2	9

Sheet C	1	2	3	4	5	6	7	8	9	10	Final
Nova Scotia (Stevens) 🔨	1	0	0	1	0	0	4	0	0	3	9
Ontario (Armstrong)	0	1	0	0	0	1	0	2	3	0	7

Sheet D	1	2	3	4	5	6	7	8	9	10	Final
Canada (Einarson) 🔨	1	0	0	2	0	1	0	3	0	2	9
British Columbia (Reese-Hansen)	0	2	1	0	1	0	3	0	1	0	8

=== Draw 18 ===
Thursday, January 29, 7:00 pm

Sheet A	1	2	3	4	5	6	7	8	9	10	Final
Newfoundland and Labrador (Mitchell) 🔨	0	1	0	0	1	1	1	0	1	X	5
Prince Edward Island (Power)	0	0	1	4	0	0	0	3	0	X	8

Sheet B	1	2	3	4	5	6	7	8	9	10	Final
New Brunswick (Forsythe)	0	0	2	0	0	1	1	0	0	X	4
Northern Ontario (Scharf) 🔨	1	2	0	2	1	0	0	2	1	X	9

Sheet C	1	2	3	4	5	6	7	8	9	10	Final
Manitoba (Peterson) 🔨	2	1	0	1	0	2	0	0	0	1	7
Alberta (Sturmay)	0	0	1	0	1	0	1	1	1	0	5

Sheet D	1	2	3	4	5	6	7	8	9	10	Final
Nova Scotia (Black) 🔨	0	2	0	1	0	0	0	2	0	0	5
Alberta (Skrlik)	0	0	2	0	2	1	1	0	0	1	7

== Championship round ==
Page 1/2 Qualifier
A1 vs. B2
A1	Manitoba (Lawes)	8
B2	Nova Scotia (Black)	6

Page 3/4 Qualifier
B2 vs. A3
B2	Nova Scotia (Black)	11
A3	Nova Scotia (Stevens)	6

Qualified for Playoffs
Manitoba (Lawes)	To 1 vs. 2 Page
Nova Scotia (Black)	To 3 vs. 4 Page

Page 1/2 Qualifier
B1 vs. A2
B1	Manitoba (Peterson)	5
A2	Canada	8

Page 3/4 Qualifier
B1 vs. B3
B1	Manitoba (Peterson)	4
B3	Alberta (Sturmay)	10

Qualified for Playoffs
Canada	To 1 vs. 2 Page
Alberta (Sturmay)	To 3 vs. 4 Page

=== Page 1/2 Qualifier ===
Friday, January 30, 1:00 pm

Sheet B	1	2	3	4	5	6	7	8	9	10	Final
Manitoba (Peterson) 🔨	0	1	0	1	0	0	2	0	1	0	5
Canada (Einarson)	1	0	2	0	1	0	0	2	0	2	8

Player percentages
Manitoba (Peterson)		Canada	
Melissa Gordon-Kurz	79%	Karlee Burgess	88%
Katherine Remillard	78%	Shannon Birchard	95%
Beth Peterson	81%	Val Sweeting	93%
Kelsey Calvert	88%	Kerri Einarson	83%
Total	81%	Total	90%

Sheet C	1	2	3	4	5	6	7	8	9	10	Final
Manitoba (Lawes) 🔨	2	0	1	0	0	2	1	0	0	2	8
Nova Scotia (Black)	0	2	0	2	0	0	0	2	0	0	6

Player percentages
Manitoba (Lawes)		Nova Scotia (Black)	
Kristin Gordon	91%	Karlee Everist	93%
Laura Walker	90%	Marlee Powers	84%
Selena Njegovan	80%	Jill Brothers	79%
Kaitlyn Lawes	76%	Christina Black	91%
Total	84%	Total	87%

=== Page 3/4 Qualifier ===
Friday, January 30, 7:00 pm

Sheet B	1	2	3	4	5	6	7	8	9	10	Final
Nova Scotia (Black) 🔨	4	1	0	2	2	0	2	0	X	X	11
Nova Scotia (Stevens)	0	0	2	0	0	2	0	2	X	X	6

Player percentages
Nova Scotia (Black)		Nova Scotia (Stevens)	
Karlee Everist	83%	Cate Fitzgerald	84%
Jenn Baxter	92%	Alison Umlah	69%
Jill Brothers	78%	Maria Fitzgerald	73%
Christina Black	80%	Taylour Stevens	55%
Total	83%	Total	70%

Sheet C	1	2	3	4	5	6	7	8	9	10	Final
Manitoba (Peterson) 🔨	2	0	0	0	0	1	0	1	X	X	4
Alberta (Sturmay)	0	2	3	3	1	0	1	0	X	X	10

Player percentages
Manitoba (Peterson)		Alberta (Sturmay)	
Melissa Gordon-Kurz	83%	Paige Papley	81%
Katherine Remillard	63%	Dezaray Hawes	84%
Beth Peterson	67%	Danielle Schmiemann	95%
Kelsey Calvert	58%	Selena Sturmay	89%
Total	68%	Total	88%

== Playoffs ==
Page playoff system
1	Manitoba (Lawes)	10
2	Canada	2
3	Nova Scotia (Black)	4
4	Alberta (Sturmay)	8

Semifinal
2	Canada	12
4	Alberta (Sturmay)	5

Final
1	Manitoba (Lawes)	3
2	Canada	4

=== 1 vs. 2 ===
Saturday, January 31, 7:00 pm

Sheet C	1	2	3	4	5	6	7	8	9	10	Final
Manitoba (Lawes) 🔨	4	0	2	1	1	1	0	1	X	X	10
Canada (Einarson)	0	1	0	0	0	0	1	0	X	X	2

Player percentages
Manitoba (Lawes)		Canada	
Kristin Gordon	84%	Karlee Burgess	97%
Laura Walker	78%	Shannon Birchard	66%
Selena Njegovan	89%	Val Sweeting	72%
Kaitlyn Lawes	78%	Kerri Einarson	45%
Total	82%	Total	70%

=== 3 vs. 4 ===
Saturday, January 31, 1:00 pm

Sheet C	1	2	3	4	5	6	7	8	9	10	Final
Nova Scotia (Black) 🔨	0	1	1	0	0	0	2	0	0	0	4
Alberta (Sturmay)	0	0	0	1	1	1	0	3	1	1	8

Player percentages
Nova Scotia (Black)		Alberta (Sturmay)	
Karlee Everist	84%	Paige Papley	89%
Marlee Powers	73%	Dezaray Hawes	79%
Jill Brothers	85%	Danielle Schmiemann	85%
Christina Black	66%	Selena Sturmay	69%
Total	77%	Total	80%

=== Semifinal ===
Sunday, February 1, 1:00 pm

Sheet C	1	2	3	4	5	6	7	8	9	10	Final
Canada (Einarson) 🔨	0	3	0	2	0	2	0	0	5	X	12
Alberta (Sturmay)	0	0	1	0	2	0	1	1	0	X	5

Player percentages
Canada		Alberta (Sturmay)	
Karlee Burgess	93%	Paige Papley	94%
Shannon Birchard	90%	Dezaray Hawes	82%
Val Sweeting	89%	Danielle Schmiemann	79%
Kerri Einarson	88%	Selena Sturmay	75%
Total	90%	Total	83%

=== Final ===
Sunday, February 1, 7:00 pm

Sheet C	1	2	3	4	5	6	7	8	9	10	11	Final
Manitoba (Lawes) 🔨	0	0	0	0	0	2	1	0	0	0	0	3
Canada (Einarson)	0	1	0	1	0	0	0	0	0	1	1	4

Player percentages
Manitoba (Lawes)		Canada	
Kristin Gordon	94%	Karlee Burgess	91%
Laura Walker	91%	Shannon Birchard	82%
Selena Njegovan	94%	Val Sweeting	93%
Kaitlyn Lawes	78%	Kerri Einarson	81%
Total	89%	Total	87%

== Statistics ==
=== Top 5 round robin player percentages ===
Round Robin Only; minimum 5 games played

Key
First All-Star Team
Second All-Star Team

Leads	%
(Canada) Karlee Burgess	89
(Saskatchewan) Dayna Demmans	88
(Ontario) Rachel Steele	88
(British Columbia) Julianna MacKenzie	88
(Quebec) Mégane Fortin	87
(Nova Scotia) (B) Karlee Everist	87
(Northern Ontario) Sarah Potts	87
(Alberta) (Sk) Geri-Lynn Ramsay	87
(Manitoba) (P) Melissa Gordon-Kurz	87

Seconds	%
(Ontario) Michaela Robert	86
(Manitoba) (L) Laura Walker	86
(Canada) Shannon Birchard	85
(Alberta) (St) Dezaray Hawes	85
(Quebec) Megan Lafrance	84

Thirds	%
(Manitoba) (L) Selena Njegovan	88
(Alberta) (Sk) Margot Flemming	85
(Canada) Val Sweeting	85
(Alberta) (St) Danielle Schmiemann	84
(Manitoba) (P) Beth Peterson	84

Skips	%
(Canada) Kerri Einarson	85
(Manitoba) (L) Kaitlyn Lawes	85
(Manitoba) (P) Kelsey Calvert	84
(Nova Scotia) (S) Taylour Stevens	82
(Nova Scotia) (B) Christina Black	81

=== Perfect games ===
Round robin only; minimum 10 shots thrown

Player	Team	Position	Shots	Opponent
Dayna Demmans	Saskatchewan	Lead	20	Northwest Territories
Margot Flemming	Alberta (Skrlik)	Third	18	Nunavut

== Awards ==
The Awards for the 2026 Scotties Tournament of Hearts were as follows:

=== All-Star teams ===
The All-Star Teams were determined by a combination of media vote and playing percentages:

Robin Wilson First Team
Position	Name	Team
Skip	Kelsey Calvert	Manitoba (P)
Third	Selena Njegovan	Manitoba (L)
Second	Michaela Robert	Ontario
Lead	Karlee Burgess	Canada

Second Team
Position	Name	Team
Skip	Kerri Einarson	Canada
Third	Danielle Schmiemann	Alberta (St)
Second	Laura Walker	Manitoba (L)
Lead	Sarah Potts	Northern Ontario

=== Marj Mitchell Sportsmanship Award ===
The Marj Mitchell Sportsmanship Award was presented to the player chosen by their fellow peers as the curler that most exemplified sportsmanship and dedication to curling during the annual Scotties Tournament of Hearts.

Name	Position	Team
Kayla Skrlik	Skip	Alberta (Sk)

== Provincial and territorial playdowns ==
- 2026 Alberta Women's Curling Championship: January 5–11
- (British Columbia) 2026 BC Women's Curling Championship: December 30 – January 4
- 2026 RME Women of the Rings (Manitoba): December 31 – January 4
- 2026 New Brunswick Women's Curling Championship: December 3–7
- 2026 Newfoundland and Labrador Women's Curling Championship: January 2–6
- 2026 Northern Ontario Women's Curling Championship: January 7–11
- 2026 Northwest Territories Women's Curling Championship: December 18–21
- 2026 Ocean Contractors Women's Curling Championship (Nova Scotia): January 6–11
- ~~2026 Nunavut Women's Curling Championship~~: not held (Note: Team Julia Weagle was the only team to enter the Nunavut Territorial playdowns.)
- 2026 Ontario Women's Curling Championship: January 4–11
- (Prince Edward Island) 2026 PEI Women's Curling Championship: January 2–5
- 2026 Quebec Women's Curling Championship: January 4–7
- 2026 Bunge Prairie Pinnacle (Saskatchewan): January 5–11
- ~~2026 Yukon Women's Curling Championship~~: not held (Note: Team Bayly Scoffin was the only team to enter the Yukon Territorial playdowns.)
