= 2025 Scotties Tournament of Hearts =

Canada's women's curling championship

- Host city: Thunder Bay, Ontario
- Arena: Fort William Gardens
- Dates: February 14–23
- Attendance: 54,426
- Winner: Canada
- Curling club: Ottawa CC, Ottawa
- Skip: Rachel Homan
- Third: Tracy Fleury
- Second: Emma Miskew
- Lead: Sarah Wilkes
- Alternate: Rachelle Brown
- Coach: Jennifer Jones
- Finalist: Manitoba (Kerri Einarson)

The 2025 Scotties Tournament of Hearts, Canada's national women's curling championship, was held from February 14 to 23 at the Fort William Gardens in Thunder Bay, Ontario. The winning Rachel Homan team will represent Canada at the 2025 World Women's Curling Championship at the Uijeongbu Indoor Ice Rink in Uijeongbu, South Korea.

== Summary ==
A few days before the tournament started, Northwest Territories skip Kerry Galusha, a proud supporter of the development of curling in Canada's North and Indigenous communities, announced her retirement from competitive curling after the 2025 Hearts. The 2025 Hearts marked her 19th appearance at the national championship (excluding official Scotties pre-qualifying tournaments), and Galusha finished the event with a total of 173 games played at the Scotties, which ties her with Mary-Anne Arsenault for 4th all time in total career games played at the hearts.

A February 13 snowstorm in southern Ontario delayed flights from Toronto, meaning Team BC and Saskatchewan's lead Deanna Doig did not arrive at the Scotties until the morning of February 14, the same day as their first game of competition. It did not matter, as both teams won their first games, including Saskatchewan beating the hometown Northern Ontario rink, skipped by Krista McCarville. Also in the first draw, Team Alberta (Kayla Skrlik) played with just three players due to their lead, Geri-Lynn Ramsay being ill, and their alternate Crystal Rumberg not arriving to the event yet. Despite being shorthanded, they won their first game over New Brunswick. Ramsay was back in action for their second game.

In their first game against Kaitlyn Lawes, Team Quebec (skipped by Laurie St-Georges) set a tournament record by making seven steals in a single game. In the match, they stole one in the first end, and then after the second was blanked, stole singles in the next five ends, followed by a steal of two in the eighth. Quebec won the game 8–2.

During early part of Draw 3 action, curlers complained of a "greasy substance" which blackened their brushheads. This resulted in a mopping of the ice, and teams were allowed to change their brushheads. Ice conditions continued to be an issue the next day, with Team Canada skip Rachel Homan stating "[the ice is] fairly straight just kind of everywhere, and then some spots more than others [...] it can be a bit challenging for sure".

Team Canada clinched first place in their pool in the evening draw of February 19 after their win over Nunavut. British Columbia (Corryn Brown) and Alberta (Kayla Skrlik) also secured Group A playoff berths that evening.

In Pool B, Team Manitoba (Kerri Einarson) clinched first place after their final game on February 20. The team had to win their last four games to do it, and had trailed at the fifth end break in three of those four games. Team Nova Scotia (Christina Black) and Ontario (Danielle Inglis) also clinched playoff berths from the group.

Both Manitoba–Einarson and Team Canada (Homan) advanced to the page playoff 1 vs. 2 game by winning their playoff games on February 21. To qualify, Homan's rink defeated Nova Scotia (Black) 10–5, while Einarson defeated Alberta (Skrlik) 7–4. Skrlik rebounded by beating Ontario (Inglis) in the 3/4 page qualifier game, while Black's Nova Scotia rink downed British Columbia (Brown) 10–5. This eliminated Brown and Inglis from the playoffs, while Black and Skrlik advanced to the page 3 vs. 4 game. Also on February 21, Team Canada's Homan and Tracy Fleury, and B.C.'s Sarah Koltun and Samantha Fisher were named first team tournament all-stars, while Quebec's Laurie St-Georges, Einarson's third Val Sweeting, Manitoba–Lawes' Jocelyn Peterman and Einarson's lead Krysten Karwacki were named second team all-stars.

In the 3 vs. 4 game, Nova Scotia's Christina Black rink took on Alberta's Kayla Skrlik. Early in the game, Nova Scotia's second Jennifer Baxter had to leave the game due to a "family emergency" (it was later revealed her father had died), and was replaced by alternate Marlee Powers, who had already seen action in the tournament as part of the team's front-end rotation. The switch didn't phase the team, who won 8–7. After trailing 6–5 after eight ends, Black scored three in the ninth after drawing to a piece of the button. In the 10th end, Skrlik had to make a difficult quadruple takeout to score two and tie the game, but missed, thus losing the match. With the win, the team advanced to the semifinal, Black's first as a skip, and second in her career, after having played in the 2018 semifinal as a part of the Mary-Anne Arsenault rink.

Team Canada's Rachel Homan rink won the 1 vs. 2 page playoff game over Manitoba's Kerri Einarson, 8–4. The game was tied 2–2 after five, but Homan made an in-off through a narrow port of staggered guards to score two. Homan scored another deuce in the seventh after Einarson missed both her shots, a draw and a long angle raise. Einarson managed to score two in the eighth end, but game up another two-ender in the ninth when Homan ran an Einarson stone on to her own rock, tapping it back to remove another Einarson rock off the button. Einarson conceded the game at that point. The win put Homan into the final, and dropped Einarson into the semifinal to face Black. It would be the seventh finals appearance for Homan and second Emma Miskew.

Einarson's Manitoba rink defeated Nova Scotia in the semifinal, 9–8. The game came down to the last end, when the game was tied 8–8 with Einarson having hammer. On her last stone, Einarson made a lightweight tap of a Nova Scotia stone, but it jammed on one of her rocks. This forced a measurement, which revealed that she had tapped the rock far enough to score a single, winning the game. The win would put Einarson into the final in a rematch against Homan.

Rachel Homan's Ottawa team successfully defended its gold medal in the final before an sellout crowd and completed an unprecedented second straight undefeated run through the Scotties with a 6–1 win over Manitoba's Team Kerri Einarson. In the process Team Homan tied its record for consecutive wins at the Scotties with its 22nd straight victory. Homan became the first player at any position to be score a perfect 100 per cent shooting percentage in a Scotties gold-medal game. It was a tight game through six ends, and it was Homan — who delivered back-to-back double takeouts in the third end to stop a potential for a 2 or 3, and prompt a blanked end. The teams traded singles in the fourth and fifth ends, but in the back half of the game, it was Team Canada that was able to pull away. After a blanked sixth, Homan made a hit-and-roll behind a short centre guard, and Einarson was heavy with her draw to bite the pin, giving Team Canada a steal of one. An end later, Einarson needed a piece of the four-foot looking at two Team Canada counters and barely got into the 12-foot. The gloves came off for handshakes with another stolen point for Team Homan, ending a game that was the lowest scoring in Scotties final history, eclipsing the eight points combined in 1994 when, Team Canada (skipped by Sandra Schmirler) defeated a Manitoba team skipped by Connie Laliberte 5-3.

Team Homan trailed their opponent only three times during the entire competition. In Draw #3, Team Northern Ontario (McCarville) began the game with the hammer and scored one point, leading 1–0. Homan responded with four, and McCarville then notched three to tie the game. Homan then scored three and led for the remainder of the game. In Draw #9, Team Saskatchewan (Martin) began the game with a steal of one from Homan, who had LSFE (hammer in the first end), to lead 1–0. Homan took the lead 2–1, Martin then tied, and later took the lead 5–4 after six ends. Homan responded and eventually won the game. Furthermore, Team Homan only twice allowed their opponent to steal. In the aforementioned Draw #9 game against the Martin rink, Team Saskatchewan opened the game with a steal of one. In draw #13, Team British Columbia (Brown) stole one in the eighth in a nail-biter to the finish.

== Teams ==
A total of eighteen teams qualified for the 2025 Scotties. The fourteen Canadian curling member associations held playdowns to determine who would represent their province or territory. Team Canada was represented by Team Rachel Homan, who won the 2024 Scotties Tournament of Hearts.

In a slight change in the qualification format from 2024, the final three teams in the field pre-qualified for the 2025 Scotties based on their 2023–24 Canadian Team Ranking Standings, which meant they bypassed the provincial qualifiers. These spots initially went to Teams Chelsea Carey, Kerri Einarson and Kaitlyn Lawes. This is different from the 2024 qualification where two teams pre-qualified for the event with the final spot going to the highest ranked team on the CTRS standings following the conclusion of the provincial championships.

On January 2, Karlee Burgess left Team Carey, meaning they no longer retained three of their four players from the previous year. Their spot was then given to the next highest ranked team on the 2023–24 CTRS rankings, Team Selena Sturmay.

The teams are listed as follows:

Canada	Alberta (Skrlik)	British Columbia
Ottawa CC, Ottawa Skip: Rachel Homan; Third: Tracy Fleury; Second: Emma Miskew; Lead: Sarah Wilkes (Note: Team Canada's alternate Rachelle Brown threw lead stones for the last end of Draws 1 and 15.); Alternate: Rachelle Brown	Garrison CC, Calgary Skip: Kayla Skrlik; Third: Margot Flemming; Second: Ashton Skrlik; Lead: Geri-Lynn Ramsay (Note: For Draw 1, Team Alberta (Skrlik) played with three players as lead Geri-Lynn Ramsay fell ill prior to Draw 1 and alternate Crystal Rumberg was not yet in Thunder Bay for the event. Ramsay would return to the lineup for Draw 3.); Alternate: Crystal Rumberg	Kamloops CC, Kamloops Skip: Corryn Brown; Third: Erin Pincott; Second: Sarah Koltun; Lead: Samantha Fisher (Note: Team British Columbia's alternate Kristen Ryan threw lead stones for the last two ends of Draw 9.); Alternate: Kristen Ryan
Manitoba (Cameron)	New Brunswick	Newfoundland and Labrador
Heather CC, Winnipeg Skip: Kate Cameron; Third: Taylor McDonald; Second: Brianna Cullen; Lead: Mackenzie Elias	Capital WC, Fredericton Skip: Melissa Adams; Third: Jaclyn Crandall; Second: Kayla Russell (Note: Team New Brunswick's alternate Molli Ward threw second stones during Draws 9 and 13.); Lead: Kendra Lister; Alternate: Molli Ward	St. John's CC, St. John's Skip: Brooke Godsland; Third: Erin Porter (Note: For the last two ends of Draw 6, Team Newfoundland and Labrador's alternate Kate Paterson threw second stones, second Sarah McNeil Lamswood threw third stones and third Erin Porter sat out.); Second: Sarah McNeil Lamswood; Lead: Camille Burt (Note: Team Newfoundland and Labrador alternate Kate Paterson threw lead stones in Draw 10.); Alternate: Kate Paterson
Northern Ontario	Nova Scotia	Ontario
Fort William CC, Thunder Bay Skip: Krista McCarville; Third: Andrea Kelly; Second: Kendra Lilly (Note: Team Northern Ontario used a front-end rotation.); Lead: Ashley Sippala; Alternate: Sarah Potts	Halifax CC, Halifax Skip: Christina Black; Third: Jill Brothers; Second: Jenn Baxter (Note: Team Nova Scotia used a front-end rotation.); Lead: Karlee Everist; Alternate: Marlee Powers	Ottawa Hunt & GC, Ottawa Skip: Danielle Inglis; Third: Kira Brunton; Second: Calissa Daly; Lead: Cassandra de Groot; Alternate: Kim Tuck
Prince Edward Island	Quebec	Saskatchewan
Crapaud Community CC, Crapaud Fourth: Veronica Mayne; Skip: Jane DiCarlo (Note: For the first two ends of Draw 17, Team Prince Edward Island played with their usual lineup. After the second end, alternate Jenny White entered the game as both lead Whitney Jenkins and skip Jane DiCarlo (who threw third stones) left the game. This left the team shorthanded with just three players for the remainder of the game.); Second: Sabrina Smith (Note: Team Prince Edward Island's alternate Jenny White threw second stones for the last end of Draw 11.); Lead: Whitney Jenkins; Alternate: Jenny White	Glenmore CC, Dollard-des-Ormeaux & CC Laval-sur-le-Lac, Laval Skip: Laurie St-Georges; Third: Jamie Sinclair; Second: Emily Riley; Lead: Lisa Weagle	Nutana CC, Saskatoon Skip: Nancy Martin; Third: Chaelynn Stewart; Second: Kadriana Lott; Lead: Deanna Doig (Note: Team Saskatchewan alternate Colleen Ackerman threw lead stones in Draw 13.); Alternate: Colleen Ackerman
Northwest Territories	Nunavut	Yukon
Yellowknife CC, Yellowknife Skip: Kerry Galusha; Third: Megan Koehler; Second: Sydney Galusha (Note: Team Northwest Territories' alternate Ella Skauge threw lead stones in Draws 4, 10, and 14 and second stones in Draw 16.); Lead: Shona Barbour; Alternate: Ella Skauge	Iqaluit CC, Iqaluit Skip: Julia Weagle; Third: Sadie Pinksen; Second: Leigh Gustafson; Lead: Alison Taylor (Note: For Draw 17, Team Nunavut's lead Alison Taylor was not able to play, leaving the team shorthanded with just three players as they did not bring an alternate to the event.)	Whitehorse CC, Whitehorse Skip: Bayly Scoffin (Note: For Draws 14 and 16, Team Yukon alternate Kimberly Tuor threw second stones, second Kerry Foster threw third stones, third Raelyn Helston threw skip stones, while skip Bayly Scoffin did not play due to illness.); Third: Raelyn Helston; Second: Kerry Foster (Note: Team Yukon alternate Kimberly Tuor threw second stones during Draw 10.); Lead: Bailey Horte; Alternate: Kimberly Tuor
Manitoba (Einarson)	Manitoba (Lawes)	Alberta (Sturmay)
Gimli CC, Gimli Skip: Kerri Einarson; Third: Val Sweeting; Second: Karlee Burgess; Lead: Krysten Karwacki (Note: Team Manitoba (Einarson) alternate Lauren Lenentine threw lead stones during Draw 10.); Alternate: Lauren Lenentine	Heather CC, Winnipeg Skip: Kaitlyn Lawes (Note: Beginning in Draw 10, third Selena Njegovan took over as skip of Team Manitoba (Lawes).); Third: Selena Njegovan; Second: Jocelyn Peterman (Note: Team Manitoba (Lawes)'s alternate Becca Hebert threw lead stones for the last end of Draw 2 and second stones for the last end of Draw 4.); Lead: Kristin Gordon; Alternate: Becca Hebert	Saville Community SC, Edmonton Skip: Selena Sturmay; Third: Danielle Schmiemann; Second: Dezaray Hawes; Lead: Paige Papley

=== CTRS Rankings ===
As of February 11, 2025

Member Association (Skip)	Rank	Points
Canada (Homan)	1	383.750
Manitoba (Einarson)	2	254.000
Alberta (Skrlik)	3	184.625
Nova Scotia (Black)	4	153.063
Manitoba (Lawes)	5	141.250
Manitoba (Cameron)	6	122.438
British Columbia (Brown)	9	115.688
Ontario (Inglis)	11	79.313
Alberta (Sturmay)	12	74.500
Northern Ontario (McCarville)	17	70.000
Quebec (St-Georges)	19	69.000
Saskatchewan (Martin)	22	61.375
New Brunswick (Adams)	53	21.250
Northwest Territories (Galusha)	72	12.250
Newfoundland and Labrador (Godsland)	85	7.500
Prince Edward Island (DiCarlo)	87	7.125
Nunavut (Weagle)	136	0.563
Yukon (Scoffin)	NR	0.000

== Map of teams ==
Team Canada Pre-Qualified Teams Provincial Winners

== Round robin standings ==
Final Round Robin Standings

Key
Teams to Championship Round

Pool A	Skip	W	L	W–L	PF	PA	EW	EL	BE	SE	S%	LSD
Canada	Rachel Homan	8	0	–	72	40	40	29	2	9	86%	356.4
Alberta (Skrlik)	Kayla Skrlik	6	2	1–0	58	50	33	33	4	9	80%	513.8
British Columbia	Corryn Brown	6	2	0–1	68	39	45	26	2	22	85%	421.7
Saskatchewan	Nancy Martin	5	3	–	58	55	36	35	4	6	77%	452.7
Alberta (Sturmay)	Selena Sturmay	4	4	1–0	61	56	37	32	2	9	81%	428.8
Northern Ontario	Krista McCarville	4	4	0–1	64	52	32	32	3	11	79%	603.7
New Brunswick	Melissa Adams	2	6	–	43	60	29	39	4	2	76%	779.5
Prince Edward Island	Jane DiCarlo	1	7	–	37	75	30	41	1	8	72%	778.9
Nunavut	Julia Weagle	0	8	–	31	65	24	39	4	4	73%	1244.5

Pool B	Skip	W	L	W–L	PF	PA	EW	EL	BE	SE	S%	LSD
Manitoba (Einarson)	Kerri Einarson	6	2	2–0	64	51	37	38	3	8	85%	486.5
Nova Scotia	Christina Black	6	2	1–1	65	55	41	34	2	13	84%	452.6
Ontario	Danielle Inglis	6	2	0–2	61	47	40	30	2	15	80%	774.9
Quebec	Laurie St-Georges	5	3	–	64	46	36	28	4	14	82%	386.8
Manitoba (Lawes)	Kaitlyn Lawes	4	4	1–0	64	46	33	35	3	8	83%	241.8
Manitoba (Cameron)	Kate Cameron	4	4	0–1	68	57	37	30	5	13	80%	485.1
Northwest Territories	Kerry Galusha	3	5	–	55	69	33	34	2	10	75%	692.2
Newfoundland and Labrador	Brooke Godsland	1	7	1–0	44	78	27	41	3	4	74%	1148.8
Yukon	Bayly Scoffin	1	7	0–1	44	80	28	42	0	5	72%	1213.4

Pool A Round Robin Summary Table
Pos.	Team	(Alberta) AB–Sk	(Alberta) AB–St	(British Columbia) BC	(Canada) CAN	(New Brunswick) NB	(Northern Ontario) NO	(Nunavut) NU	(Prince Edward Island) PE	(Saskatchewan) SK	Record
2	Alberta (Skrlik)	—	6–5	9–8	7–9	8–4	4–10	7–4	7–4	10–5	6–2
5	Alberta (Sturmay)	5–6	—	4–11	4–8	10–8	10–6	11–4	9–4	8–9	4–4
3	British Columbia	8–9	11–4	—	5–7	9–4	9–3	10–3	9–2	7–6	6–2
1	Canada	9–7	8–4	7–5	—	7–4	10–7	9–3	13–4	9–6	8–0
7	New Brunswick	4–8	8–10	4–9	4–7	—	3–9	6–3	8–7	5–7	2–6
6	Northern Ontario	10–4	6–10	3–9	7–10	9–3	—	8–4	15–2	6–10	4–4
9	Nunavut	4–7	4–11	3–10	3–9	3–6	4–8	—	6–7	4–7	0–8
8	Prince Edward Island	4–7	4–9	2–9	4–13	7–8	2–15	7–6	—	6–8	1–7
4	Saskatchewan	5–10	9–8	6–7	6–9	7–5	10–6	7–4	8–6	—	5–3

Pool B Round Robin Summary Table
Pos.	Team	(Manitoba) MB–C	(Manitoba) MB–E	(Manitoba) MB–L	(Newfoundland and Labrador) NL	(Northwest Territories) NT	(Nova Scotia) NS	(Ontario) ON	(Quebec) QC	(Yukon) YT	Record
6	Manitoba (Cameron)	—	9–10	3–12	15–4	8–4	6–8	6–8	12–6	9–5	4–4
1	Manitoba (Einarson)	10–9	—	9–6	6–4	6–9	9–6	8–6	6–9	10–2	6–2
5	Manitoba (Lawes)	12–3	6–9	—	13–3	8–4	6–7	6–8	2–8	11–4	4–4
8	Newfoundland and Labrador	4–15	4–6	3–13	—	7–8	4–11	7–8	4–11	11–6	1–7
7	Northwest Territories	4–8	9–6	4–8	8–7	—	10–11	3–9	3–12	14–8	3–5
2	Nova Scotia	8–6	6–9	7–6	11–4	11–10	—	7–5	7–6	8–9	6–2
3	Ontario	8–6	6–8	8–6	8–7	9–3	5–7	—	8–4	9–6	6–2
4	Quebec	6–12	9–6	8–2	11–4	12–3	6–7	4–8	—	8–4	5–3
9	Yukon	5–9	2–10	4–11	6–11	8–14	9–8	6–9	4–8	—	1–7

== Round robin results ==
All draw times are listed in Eastern Time (UTC−05:00).

=== Draw 1 ===
Friday, February 14, 7:00 pm

Sheet A	1	2	3	4	5	6	7	8	9	10	Final
Saskatchewan (Martin) 🔨	0	3	0	2	0	1	0	1	0	3	10
Northern Ontario (McCarville)	0	0	1	0	2	0	2	0	1	0	6

Sheet B	1	2	3	4	5	6	7	8	9	10	Final
Canada (Homan)	2	0	4	0	2	2	0	3	X	X	13
Prince Edward Island (DiCarlo) 🔨	0	2	0	1	0	0	1	0	X	X	4

Sheet C	1	2	3	4	5	6	7	8	9	10	Final
Alberta (Skrlik)	0	0	2	2	0	1	0	3	0	X	8
New Brunswick (Adams) 🔨	0	1	0	0	1	0	1	0	1	X	4

Sheet D	1	2	3	4	5	6	7	8	9	10	Final
British Columbia (Brown)	0	3	0	2	1	0	1	2	2	X	11
Alberta (Sturmay) 🔨	1	0	1	0	0	2	0	0	0	X	4

=== Draw 2 ===
Saturday, February 15, 2:00 pm

Sheet A	1	2	3	4	5	6	7	8	9	10	Final
Quebec (St-Georges)	1	0	1	1	1	1	1	2	0	X	8
Manitoba (Lawes) 🔨	0	0	0	0	0	0	0	0	2	X	2

Sheet B	1	2	3	4	5	6	7	8	9	10	Final
Manitoba (Cameron) 🔨	0	0	2	1	0	0	0	4	1	X	8
Northwest Territories (Galusha)	0	0	0	0	3	1	0	0	0	X	4

Sheet C	1	2	3	4	5	6	7	8	9	10	Final
Newfoundland and Labrador (Godsland)	1	0	1	0	0	1	0	0	1	0	4
Manitoba (Einarson) 🔨	0	1	0	1	2	0	0	1	0	1	6

Sheet D	1	2	3	4	5	6	7	8	9	10	Final
Ontario (Inglis) 🔨	1	0	0	0	1	0	2	1	0	X	5
Nova Scotia (Black)	0	0	1	2	0	1	0	0	3	X	7

=== Draw 3 ===
Saturday, February 15, 7:00 pm

Sheet A	1	2	3	4	5	6	7	8	9	10	Final
Alberta (Sturmay) 🔨	2	0	0	3	1	1	0	1	3	X	11
Nunavut (Weagle)	0	1	0	0	0	0	3	0	0	X	4

Sheet B	1	2	3	4	5	6	7	8	9	10	Final
Alberta (Skrlik) 🔨	0	2	0	0	1	0	2	3	0	1	9
British Columbia (Brown)	1	0	2	3	0	1	0	0	1	0	8

Sheet C	1	2	3	4	5	6	7	8	9	10	Final
Canada (Homan)	0	4	0	3	0	0	1	0	1	1	10
Northern Ontario (McCarville) 🔨	1	0	3	0	0	2	0	1	0	0	7

Sheet D	1	2	3	4	5	6	7	8	9	10	Final
Prince Edward Island (DiCarlo)	0	2	0	1	0	1	0	1	0	1	6
Saskatchewan (Martin) 🔨	2	0	2	0	2	0	1	0	1	0	8

=== Draw 4 ===
Sunday, February 16, 9:00 am

Sheet A	1	2	3	4	5	6	7	8	9	10	Final
Nova Scotia (Black) 🔨	1	0	2	1	0	3	0	0	1	0	8
Yukon (Scoffin)	0	2	0	0	2	0	1	1	0	3	9

Sheet B	1	2	3	4	5	6	7	8	9	10	Final
Newfoundland and Labrador (Godsland) 🔨	1	0	1	0	0	1	2	0	2	0	7
Ontario (Inglis)	0	3	0	2	1	0	0	1	0	1	8

Sheet C	1	2	3	4	5	6	7	8	9	10	Final
Manitoba (Cameron) 🔨	1	0	0	1	0	0	1	0	X	X	3
Manitoba (Lawes)	0	2	4	0	0	2	0	4	X	X	12

Sheet D	1	2	3	4	5	6	7	8	9	10	Final
Northwest Territories (Galusha) 🔨	1	0	0	1	0	1	0	X	X	X	3
Quebec (St-Georges)	0	2	1	0	2	0	7	X	X	X	12

=== Draw 5 ===
Sunday, February 16, 2:00 pm

Sheet A	1	2	3	4	5	6	7	8	9	10	Final
Canada (Homan)	1	0	2	1	0	2	0	2	0	1	9
Alberta (Skrlik) 🔨	0	1	0	0	2	0	2	0	2	0	7

Sheet B	1	2	3	4	5	6	7	8	9	10	Final
Northern Ontario (McCarville)	0	4	1	0	1	0	0	0	0	X	6
Alberta (Sturmay) 🔨	1	0	0	2	0	1	1	1	4	X	10

Sheet C	1	2	3	4	5	6	7	8	9	10	11	Final
British Columbia (Brown) 🔨	0	2	1	0	1	1	0	0	1	0	1	7
Saskatchewan (Martin)	1	0	0	1	0	0	1	2	0	1	0	6

Sheet D	1	2	3	4	5	6	7	8	9	10	Final
New Brunswick (Adams)	0	0	0	0	1	1	0	1	0	3	6
Nunavut (Weagle) 🔨	1	0	0	1	0	0	1	0	0	0	3

=== Draw 6 ===
Sunday, February 16, 7:00 pm

Sheet A	1	2	3	4	5	6	7	8	9	10	Final
Manitoba (Cameron) 🔨	2	3	1	0	1	5	0	3	X	X	15
Newfoundland and Labrador (Godsland)	0	0	0	2	0	0	2	0	X	X	4

Sheet B	1	2	3	4	5	6	7	8	9	10	Final
Manitoba (Lawes) 🔨	1	0	1	0	1	0	2	0	1	0	6
Nova Scotia (Black)	0	2	0	1	0	1	0	2	0	1	7

Sheet C	1	2	3	4	5	6	7	8	9	10	Final
Ontario (Inglis)	0	3	0	0	0	0	2	2	1	X	8
Quebec (St-Georges) 🔨	2	0	0	0	2	0	0	0	0	X	4

Sheet D	1	2	3	4	5	6	7	8	9	10	Final
Manitoba (Einarson) 🔨	2	2	1	0	1	0	1	3	X	X	10
Yukon (Scoffin)	0	0	0	1	0	1	0	0	X	X	2

=== Draw 7 ===
Monday, February 17, 9:00 am

Sheet A	1	2	3	4	5	6	7	8	9	10	Final
Northern Ontario (McCarville)	0	0	0	0	3	0	0	0	0	X	3
British Columbia (Brown) 🔨	0	1	1	1	0	2	2	1	1	X	9

Sheet B	1	2	3	4	5	6	7	8	9	10	Final
Saskatchewan (Martin) 🔨	2	1	1	0	1	0	1	0	1	X	7
New Brunswick (Adams)	0	0	0	1	0	1	0	3	0	X	5

Sheet C	1	2	3	4	5	6	7	8	9	10	Final
Nunavut (Weagle) 🔨	1	0	0	1	0	0	0	2	1	1	6
Prince Edward Island (DiCarlo)	0	1	3	0	0	2	1	0	0	0	7

Sheet D	1	2	3	4	5	6	7	8	9	10	Final
Alberta (Sturmay) 🔨	1	0	0	0	2	0	0	1	0	1	5
Alberta (Skrlik)	0	1	0	1	0	0	1	0	3	0	6

=== Draw 8 ===
Monday, February 17, 2:00 pm

Sheet A	1	2	3	4	5	6	7	8	9	10	Final
Manitoba (Lawes) 🔨	0	1	1	0	0	2	0	2	0	0	6
Ontario (Inglis)	0	0	0	2	2	0	2	0	1	1	8

Sheet B	1	2	3	4	5	6	7	8	9	10	Final
Quebec (St-Georges) 🔨	2	0	1	1	1	0	2	0	1	1	9
Manitoba (Einarson)	0	3	0	0	0	2	0	1	0	0	6

Sheet C	1	2	3	4	5	6	7	8	9	10	Final
Yukon (Scoffin)	0	2	1	0	0	2	0	3	0	X	8
Northwest Territories (Galusha) 🔨	1	0	0	5	1	0	3	0	4	X	14

Sheet D	1	2	3	4	5	6	7	8	9	10	Final
Nova Scotia (Black) 🔨	0	2	1	0	2	1	2	0	3	X	11
Newfoundland and Labrador (Godsland)	0	0	0	2	0	0	0	2	0	X	4

=== Draw 9 ===
Monday, February 17, 7:00 pm

Sheet A	1	2	3	4	5	6	7	8	9	10	11	Final
Prince Edward Island (DiCarlo)	1	0	2	0	1	0	1	1	0	1	0	7
New Brunswick (Adams) 🔨	0	2	0	3	0	1	0	0	1	0	1	8

Sheet B	1	2	3	4	5	6	7	8	9	10	Final
British Columbia (Brown) 🔨	1	2	0	1	2	3	0	1	X	X	10
Nunavut (Weagle)	0	0	2	0	0	0	1	0	X	X	3

Sheet C	1	2	3	4	5	6	7	8	9	10	Final
Northern Ontario (McCarville)	0	2	0	2	1	0	2	3	X	X	10
Alberta (Skrlik) 🔨	0	0	2	0	0	2	0	0	X	X	4

Sheet D	1	2	3	4	5	6	7	8	9	10	Final
Saskatchewan (Martin)	1	0	0	1	0	3	0	1	0	X	6
Canada (Homan) 🔨	0	2	0	0	2	0	3	0	2	X	9

=== Draw 10 ===
Tuesday, February 18, 9:00 am

Sheet A	1	2	3	4	5	6	7	8	9	10	11	Final
Northwest Territories (Galusha)	0	1	1	1	0	1	0	2	0	0	3	9
Manitoba (Einarson) 🔨	0	0	0	0	2	0	2	0	1	1	0	6

Sheet B	1	2	3	4	5	6	7	8	9	10	Final
Ontario (Inglis) 🔨	2	0	1	0	2	1	1	0	1	1	9
Yukon (Scoffin)	0	2	0	2	0	0	0	2	0	0	6

Sheet C	1	2	3	4	5	6	7	8	9	10	Final
Manitoba (Lawes) 🔨	2	3	0	2	3	0	3	0	X	X	13
Newfoundland and Labrador (Godsland)	0	0	1	0	0	1	0	1	X	X	3

Sheet D	1	2	3	4	5	6	7	8	9	10	Final
Quebec (St-Georges) 🔨	0	3	0	0	0	2	1	0	X	X	6
Manitoba (Cameron)	2	0	1	5	2	0	0	2	X	X	12

=== Draw 11 ===
Tuesday, February 18, 2:00 pm

Sheet A	1	2	3	4	5	6	7	8	9	10	Final
Alberta (Skrlik)	0	0	2	0	0	5	1	0	2	X	10
Saskatchewan (Martin) 🔨	0	0	0	2	0	0	0	3	0	X	5

Sheet B	1	2	3	4	5	6	7	8	9	10	Final
New Brunswick (Adams)	0	0	1	0	1	0	1	0	1	0	4
Canada (Homan) 🔨	0	1	0	1	0	2	0	2	0	1	7

Sheet C	1	2	3	4	5	6	7	8	9	10	Final
Prince Edward Island (DiCarlo)	1	0	0	0	0	2	0	1	X	X	4
Alberta (Sturmay) 🔨	0	2	2	1	2	0	2	0	X	X	9

Sheet D	1	2	3	4	5	6	7	8	9	10	Final
Nunavut (Weagle)	0	0	0	1	0	2	0	1	0	X	4
Northern Ontario (McCarville) 🔨	1	2	0	0	2	0	1	0	2	X	8

=== Draw 12 ===
Tuesday, February 18, 7:00 pm

Sheet A	1	2	3	4	5	6	7	8	9	10	Final
Newfoundland and Labrador (Godsland)	0	1	0	2	0	0	1	0	X	X	4
Quebec (St-Georges) 🔨	3	0	2	0	2	1	0	3	X	X	11

Sheet B	1	2	3	4	5	6	7	8	9	10	Final
Manitoba (Einarson)	0	0	2	0	0	3	0	3	0	2	10
Manitoba (Cameron) 🔨	0	3	0	2	2	0	1	0	1	0	9

Sheet C	1	2	3	4	5	6	7	8	9	10	Final
Northwest Territories (Galusha)	0	2	1	0	3	0	1	3	0	0	10
Nova Scotia (Black) 🔨	3	0	0	4	0	2	0	0	1	1	11

Sheet D	1	2	3	4	5	6	7	8	9	10	Final
Yukon (Scoffin)	0	1	0	1	2	0	0	0	X	X	4
Manitoba (Lawes) 🔨	2	0	1	0	0	2	3	3	X	X	11

=== Draw 13 ===
Wednesday, February 19, 9:00 am

Sheet A	1	2	3	4	5	6	7	8	9	10	Final
New Brunswick (Adams)	0	2	0	2	0	0	1	0	3	0	8
Alberta (Sturmay) 🔨	1	0	3	0	1	0	0	2	0	3	10

Sheet B	1	2	3	4	5	6	7	8	9	10	Final
Prince Edward Island (DiCarlo)	0	1	0	0	0	0	0	1	X	X	2
Northern Ontario (McCarville) 🔨	1	0	0	3	5	2	4	0	X	X	15

Sheet C	1	2	3	4	5	6	7	8	9	10	Final
Saskatchewan (Martin)	0	0	1	2	0	0	1	0	3	X	7
Nunavut (Weagle) 🔨	0	1	0	0	1	1	0	1	0	X	4

Sheet D	1	2	3	4	5	6	7	8	9	10	Final
Canada (Homan) 🔨	1	1	0	2	0	2	0	0	1	X	7
British Columbia (Brown)	0	0	1	0	2	0	1	1	0	X	5

=== Draw 14 ===
Wednesday, February 19, 2:00 pm

Sheet A	1	2	3	4	5	6	7	8	9	10	Final
Manitoba (Einarson) 🔨	0	0	0	1	0	2	2	1	0	3	9
Nova Scotia (Black)	1	1	1	0	2	0	0	0	1	0	6

Sheet B	1	2	3	4	5	6	7	8	9	10	Final
Northwest Territories (Galusha) 🔨	1	0	1	1	0	1	0	0	0	X	4
Manitoba (Lawes)	0	2	0	0	2	0	2	1	1	X	8

Sheet C	1	2	3	4	5	6	7	8	9	10	Final
Quebec (St-Georges) 🔨	0	2	1	0	2	0	1	0	2	X	8
Yukon (Scoffin)	0	0	0	1	0	2	0	1	0	X	4

Sheet D	1	2	3	4	5	6	7	8	9	10	11	Final
Manitoba (Cameron) 🔨	0	1	0	3	1	0	0	1	0	0	0	6
Ontario (Inglis)	0	0	2	0	0	1	1	0	1	1	2	8

=== Draw 15 ===
Wednesday, February 19, 7:00 pm

Sheet A	1	2	3	4	5	6	7	8	9	10	Final
Nunavut (Weagle)	0	0	1	0	1	0	1	0	X	X	3
Canada (Homan) 🔨	1	1	0	3	0	2	0	2	X	X	9

Sheet B	1	2	3	4	5	6	7	8	9	10	Final
Alberta (Sturmay) 🔨	1	0	3	0	1	0	1	0	2	0	8
Saskatchewan (Martin)	0	1	0	3	0	2	0	1	0	2	9

Sheet C	1	2	3	4	5	6	7	8	9	10	Final
New Brunswick (Adams)	0	0	0	0	2	0	2	0	1	X	5
British Columbia (Brown) 🔨	0	2	1	1	0	1	0	4	0	X	9

Sheet D	1	2	3	4	5	6	7	8	9	10	Final
Alberta (Skrlik) 🔨	1	0	0	1	2	1	0	0	2	0	7
Prince Edward Island (DiCarlo)	0	1	1	0	0	0	1	1	0	1	5

=== Draw 16 ===
Thursday, February 20, 9:00 am

Sheet A	1	2	3	4	5	6	7	8	9	10	Final
Yukon (Scoffin)	0	0	0	2	0	1	1	0	1	X	5
Manitoba (Cameron) 🔨	1	1	3	0	1	0	0	3	0	X	9

Sheet B	1	2	3	4	5	6	7	8	9	10	Final
Nova Scotia (Black)	1	1	0	2	0	1	0	0	1	1	7
Quebec (St-Georges) 🔨	0	0	3	0	1	0	0	2	0	0	6

Sheet C	1	2	3	4	5	6	7	8	9	10	11	Final
Manitoba (Einarson)	0	0	2	0	0	1	0	2	1	0	2	8
Ontario (Inglis) 🔨	0	2	0	1	1	0	1	0	0	1	0	6

Sheet D	1	2	3	4	5	6	7	8	9	10	11	Final
Newfoundland and Labrador (Godsland)	0	0	0	1	0	3	1	2	0	0	0	7
Northwest Territories (Galusha) 🔨	0	2	0	0	2	0	0	0	2	1	1	8

=== Draw 17 ===
Thursday, February 20, 2:00 pm

Sheet A	1	2	3	4	5	6	7	8	9	10	Final
British Columbia (Brown) 🔨	2	1	1	0	0	1	2	2	X	X	9
Prince Edward Island (DiCarlo)	0	0	0	1	1	0	0	0	X	X	2

Sheet B	1	2	3	4	5	6	7	8	9	10	Final
Nunavut (Weagle)	0	0	0	0	2	0	0	2	0	X	4
Alberta (Skrlik) 🔨	1	2	0	1	0	0	2	0	1	X	7

Sheet C	1	2	3	4	5	6	7	8	9	10	Final
Alberta (Sturmay) 🔨	0	1	0	1	0	0	2	0	0	X	4
Canada (Homan)	1	0	1	0	2	2	0	0	2	X	8

Sheet D	1	2	3	4	5	6	7	8	9	10	Final
Northern Ontario (McCarville) 🔨	0	2	1	1	0	2	3	0	X	X	9
New Brunswick (Adams)	0	0	0	0	2	0	0	1	X	X	3

=== Draw 18 ===
Thursday, February 20, 7:00 pm

Sheet A	1	2	3	4	5	6	7	8	9	10	Final
Ontario (Inglis)	0	0	3	0	3	2	1	0	X	X	9
Northwest Territories (Galusha) 🔨	0	1	0	1	0	0	0	1	X	X	3

Sheet B	1	2	3	4	5	6	7	8	9	10	Final
Yukon (Scoffin)	0	0	1	0	2	0	2	0	1	0	6
Newfoundland and Labrador (Godsland) 🔨	0	0	0	2	0	3	0	2	0	4	11

Sheet C	1	2	3	4	5	6	7	8	9	10	Final
Nova Scotia (Black) 🔨	2	0	0	2	0	2	0	1	1	0	8
Manitoba (Cameron)	0	2	1	0	1	0	1	0	0	1	6

Sheet D	1	2	3	4	5	6	7	8	9	10	Final
Manitoba (Lawes)	0	1	0	1	0	0	2	0	2	0	6
Manitoba (Einarson) 🔨	1	0	2	0	0	2	0	1	0	3	9

== Championship round ==
Page 1/2 Qualifier
A1 vs. B2
A1	Canada	10
B2	Nova Scotia	5

Page 3/4 Qualifier
B2 vs. A3
B2	Nova Scotia	10
A3	British Columbia	5

Qualified for Playoffs
Canada	To 1 vs. 2 Page
Nova Scotia	To 3 vs. 4 Page

Page 1/2 Qualifier
B1 vs. A2
B1	Manitoba (Einarson)	7
A2	Alberta (Skrlik)	4

Page 3/4 Qualifier
A2 vs. B3
A2	Alberta (Skrlik)	9
B3	Ontario	8

Qualified for Playoffs
Manitoba (Einarson)	To 1 vs. 2 Page
Alberta (Skrlik)	To 3 vs. 4 Page

=== Page 1/2 Qualifier ===
Friday, February 21, 1:00 pm

Sheet A	1	2	3	4	5	6	7	8	9	10	Final
Canada (Homan) 🔨	1	1	0	1	1	1	0	2	0	3	10
Nova Scotia (Black)	0	0	2	0	0	0	1	0	2	0	5

Player percentages
Canada		Nova Scotia	
Sarah Wilkes	94%	Karlee Everist	84%
Emma Miskew	85%	Jenn Baxter	80%
Tracy Fleury	91%	Jill Brothers	81%
Rachel Homan	80%	Christina Black	69%
Total	88%	Total	78%

Sheet C	1	2	3	4	5	6	7	8	9	10	Final
Manitoba (Einarson) 🔨	0	2	0	1	0	1	0	0	3	0	7
Alberta (Skrlik)	0	0	0	0	2	0	1	0	0	1	4

Player percentages
Manitoba (Einarson)		Alberta (Skrlik)	
Krysten Karwacki	91%	Geri-Lynn Ramsay	98%
Karlee Burgess	93%	Ashton Skrlik	85%
Val Sweeting	90%	Margot Flemming	85%
Kerri Einarson	86%	Kayla Skrlik	81%
Total	90%	Total	87%

=== Page 3/4 Qualifier ===
Friday, February 21, 7:00 pm

Sheet B	1	2	3	4	5	6	7	8	9	10	Final
Nova Scotia (Black) 🔨	2	1	0	1	0	2	1	0	1	2	10
British Columbia (Brown)	0	0	1	0	2	0	0	2	0	0	5

Player percentages
Nova Scotia		British Columbia	
Karlee Everist	90%	Samantha Fisher	89%
Marlee Powers	89%	Sarah Koltun	93%
Jill Brothers	93%	Erin Pincott	85%
Christina Black	86%	Corryn Brown	59%
Total	89%	Total	81%

Sheet D	1	2	3	4	5	6	7	8	9	10	Final
Alberta (Skrlik)	0	2	1	0	2	1	0	3	0	0	9
Ontario (Inglis) 🔨	2	0	0	1	0	0	1	0	2	2	8

Player percentages
Alberta (Skrlik)		Ontario	
Geri-Lynn Ramsay	75%	Cassandra de Groot	86%
Ashton Skrlik	79%	Calissa Daly	78%
Margot Flemming	75%	Kira Brunton	61%
Kayla Skrlik	75%	Danielle Inglis	57%
Total	76%	Total	71%

== Playoffs ==
Page playoff system
1	Canada	8
2	Manitoba (Einarson)	4
3	Nova Scotia	8
4	Alberta (Skrlik)	7

Semifinal
2	Manitoba (Einarson)	9
3	Nova Scotia	8

Final
1	Canada	6
2	Manitoba (Einarson)	1

=== 1 vs. 2 ===
Saturday, February 22, 7:00 pm

Sheet B	1	2	3	4	5	6	7	8	9	10	Final
Canada (Homan) 🔨	0	1	1	0	0	2	2	0	2	X	8
Manitoba (Einarson)	0	0	0	0	2	0	0	2	0	X	4

Player percentages
Canada		Manitoba (Einarson)	
Sarah Wilkes	92%	Krysten Karwacki	89%
Emma Miskew	90%	Karlee Burgess	72%
Tracy Fleury	92%	Val Sweeting	81%
Rachel Homan	88%	Kerri Einarson	79%
Total	90%	Total	80%

=== 3 vs. 4 ===
Saturday, February 22, 1:00 pm

Sheet B	1	2	3	4	5	6	7	8	9	10	Final
Nova Scotia (Black) 🔨	2	0	0	2	0	0	1	0	3	0	8
Alberta (Skrlik)	0	0	2	0	0	1	0	3	0	1	7

Player percentages
Nova Scotia		Alberta (Skrlik)	
Karlee Everist	79%	Geri-Lynn Ramsay	88%
Jenn Baxter (Note: Following the death of her father, Baxter would leave the game at the end of the second end, and be replaced by Powers)	81%	Ashton Skrlik	73%
Marlee Powers	83%	—	
Jill Brothers	89%	Margot Flemming	80%
Christina Black	79%	Kayla Skrlik	73%
Total	82%	Total	78%

=== Semifinal ===
Sunday, February 23, 1:00 pm

Sheet B	1	2	3	4	5	6	7	8	9	10	Final
Manitoba (Einarson) 🔨	2	1	0	2	0	2	0	1	0	1	9
Nova Scotia (Black)	0	0	2	0	2	0	2	0	2	0	8

Player percentages
Manitoba (Einarson)		Nova Scotia	
Krysten Karwacki	98%	Karlee Everist	93%
Karlee Burgess	83%	Marlee Powers	81%
Val Sweeting	93%	Jill Brothers	86%
Kerri Einarson	81%	Christina Black	78%
Total	88%	Total	84%

=== Final ===
Sunday, February 23, 7:00 pm

Sheet B	1	2	3	4	5	6	7	8	9	10	Final
Canada (Homan) 🔨	0	1	0	0	1	0	1	2	1	X	6
Manitoba (Einarson)	0	0	0	1	0	0	0	0	0	X	1

Player percentages
Canada		Manitoba (Einarson)	
Sarah Wilkes	86%	Krysten Karwacki	89%
Emma Miskew	86%	Karlee Burgess	85%
Tracy Fleury	75%	Val Sweeting	86%
Rachel Homan	100%	Kerri Einarson	76%
Total	87%	Total	84%

== Statistics ==
=== Top 5 player percentages ===
Round Robin only; minimum 5 games played

Key
First All-Star Team
Second All-Star Team

Leads	%
(British Columbia) Samantha Fisher	93.3
(Manitoba) (E) Krysten Karwacki	89.6
(Nova Scotia) Karlee Everist	88.7
(New Brunswick) Kendra Lister	88.4
(Quebec) Lisa Weagle	87.6

Seconds	%
(British Columbia) Sarah Koltun	86.8
(Manitoba) (E) Karlee Burgess	84.7
(Manitoba) (L) Jocelyn Peterman	84.4
(Alberta) (St) Dezaray Hawes	82.8
(Canada) Emma Miskew	82.8

Thirds	%
(Canada) Tracy Fleury	88.2
(Manitoba) (E) Val Sweeting	87.4
(Nova Scotia) Jill Brothers	85.7
(Manitoba) (L) Selena Njegovan	83.5
(Alberta) (St) Danielle Schmiemann	83.5

Skips	%
(Canada) Rachel Homan	85.0
(Quebec) Laurie St-Georges	79.7
(Nova Scotia) Christina Black	78.4
(Manitoba) (E) Kerri Einarson	78.4
(British Columbia) Corryn Brown	78.2

=== Perfect games ===
Round robin only; minimum 10 shots thrown

Player	Team	Position	Shots	Opponent
Samantha Fisher	British Columbia	Lead	12	Nunavut
Samantha Fisher	British Columbia	Lead	16	Prince Edward Island

== Awards ==
The Awards for the 2025 Scotties Tournament of Hearts were as follows:

=== All-Star teams ===
The All-Star Teams were determined by a combination of media vote and playing percentages:

Robin Wilson First Team
Position	Name	Team
Skip	Rachel Homan	Canada
Third	Tracy Fleury	Canada
Second	Sarah Koltun	British Columbia
Lead	Samantha Fisher	British Columbia

Second Team
Position	Name	Team
Skip	Laurie St-Georges	Quebec
Third	Val Sweeting	Manitoba (E)
Second	Jocelyn Peterman	Manitoba (L)
Lead	Krysten Karwacki	Manitoba (E)

=== Marj Mitchell Sportsmanship Award ===
The Marj Mitchell Sportsmanship Award was presented to the player chosen by their fellow peers as the curler that most exemplified sportsmanship and dedication to curling during the annual Scotties Tournament of Hearts.

Name	Position	Team
Nancy Martin	Skip	Saskatchewan

=== Sandra Schmirler Most Valuable Player Award ===
The Sandra Schmirler Most Valuable Player Award was awarded to the top player in the playoff round by members of the media in the Scotties Tournament of Hearts.

Name	Position	Team
Rachel Homan (4)	Skip	Canada

=== Joan Mead Builders Award ===
This Award recognizes a builder in the sport of curling is named in honour of the late CBC curling producer Joan Mead.

- Andrea Ronnebeck – a life-long resident of Northern Ontario (Kenora) who has coached athletes of all levels for more than 40 years. Ronnebeck has been a team coach at five Scotties Tournaments of Hearts, served as Team Leader for Curling Canada's Junior Teams at World Championships, and coached at dozens of development camps around the world. She recently retired as Education Manager with the Ontario Curling Council, a position she held for 9 years. She is a Certified Master Coach Developer, a Certified Level 4 Curling Coach and an active contributor to Curling Canada's coach education programming.

== Provincial and territorial playdowns ==
- 2025 Alberta Women's Curling Championship: January 22–26
- (British Columbia) 2025 BC Women's Curling Championship: January 21–26
- 2025 RME Women of the Rings (Manitoba): January 22–26
- 2025 New Brunswick Women's Curling Championship: January 15–18
- 2025 Newfoundland and Labrador Women's Curling Championship: January 22–25
- 2025 Northern Ontario Women's Curling Championship: January 22–26
- 2025 Northwest Territories Women's Curling Championship: January 17–19
- 2025 Ocean Contractors Women's Curling Championship (Nova Scotia): January 14–19
- ~~2025 Nunavut Women's Curling Championship~~: not held (Note: Team Julia Weagle was the only team to enter the Nunavut Territorial playdowns.)
- 2025 Ontario Women's Curling Championship: January 20–26
- (Prince Edward Island) 2025 PEI Women's Curling Championship: January 23–25
- 2025 Quebec Women's Curling Championship: January 15–19
- 2025 Viterra Prairie Pinnacle (Saskatchewan): January 21–26
- 2025 Yukon Scotties Tournament of Hearts: January 10–12
