= Brenda Chapman (writer) =

Canadian writer of mystery novels

- Born: November 1, 1955 (age 70) Canada
- Occupation: Writer
- Genre: Crime and mystery fiction for children and adults
- Children: Lisa Weagle, Julia Weagle

Website
- brendachapman.ca

Brenda Chapman (born 1955) is a Canadian writer of mystery novels. Her Jennifer Bannon mysteries are for ages ten and up. She has also published several short stories and murder mysteries. Her Stonechild and Rouleau Mystery Series feature the damaged, brilliant detective Kala Stonechild and workaholic staff sergeant Jacques Rouleau.

== Bio ==
Chapman grew up in Terrace Bay, Ontario, a small town on the North Shore of Lake Superior. She graduated from Lakehead University, majoring in English literature, and earned a Bachelor of Education degree from Queen's University. After teaching special education for fifteen years, she became a senior communications advisor in the federal government. Chapman served two terms as President of Capital Crime Writers. She lives in Ottawa, Ontario.

== Published works ==
=== Novels ===
- Running Scared. Napoleon Publishing, 2004. YA
- Hiding in Hawk's Creek. Napoleon Publishing 2006 YA
- Where Trouble Leads. Napoleon Publishing 2007 YA
- Trail of Secrets. Napoleon Publishing 2009 YA
- In Winter's Grip. Rendezvous Crime Press 2010 Adult

=== Stonechild and Rouleau Mystery Series ===
- Cold Mourning. Dundurn Press 2014 Adult
- Butterfly Kills. Dundurn Press 2015 Adult
- Tumbled Graves. Dundurn Press 2016 Adult
- Shallow End. Dundurn Press 2017 Adult
- Bleeding Darkness. Dundurn Press 2018 Adult
- Turning Secrets. Dundurn Press 2019 Adult
- Closing Time. Dundurn Press 2020 Adult

=== Short stories and articles ===
- True North. Canadian Living, August 2001
- Thicker Than Water. StoryTeller Magazine,(Spring 2008) and Papercuts (Spring 2008)
- My Sister Caroline. When Boomers Go Bad, (Rendezvous Crime 2005)
- The second wife. (Rapid reads 2011)

== Awards ==
- 2008 Audrey Jessup Award for Best Short Story for Evening The Score
- Hiding in Hawk's Creek selected by the Canadian Book Centre as an Our Choice novel for 2006.

Hiding in Hawk's Creek was also a finalist for the Canadian Library Association Book of the Year for Children Award.

- 2025 Crime Writers of Canada Awards of Excellence - Best Crime Novel Set in Canada for Fatal Harvest (nominated)

== Sources ==
- Brenda Chapman on CBC Canada All in a Day Literary Salon
- "Brenda Chapman". CANSCAIP Members. Canadian Society of Children's Authors, Illustrators, and Performers (canscaip.org). Archived 2010-01-17. Retrieved 2015-07-30.
- Canadian Teacher Magazine Review of Running Scared
- The Canadian Children's Book Centre - Directory of Authors
- The Canadian Children's Book Centre (CCBC) Canadian books recommended for young readers; listing for Brenda Chapman.
- Ottawa Public Library Foundation: Brenda Chapman Profile
- Ottawa Focus, Online Guide to the Capital: Ottawa Authors
