= Julia Weagle =

Canadian curler (born 1988)

- Curler
- Born: February 10, 1988 (age 38); Ottawa, Ontario, Canada

Team
- Curling club: Iqaluit CC, Iqaluit, NU

Curling career
- Member Association: Ontario (2000–2024); Nunavut (2024–2026)
- Hearts: 2 (2025, 2026)

Julia Weagle (born February 10, 1988) is a Canadian curler from Ottawa.

== Career ==
=== Youth ===
Weagle began curling at the age of 7. When the 2001 Nokia Brier was hosted in Ottawa, Weagle beat future World Champion Rachel Homan in a special little rock bonspiel played on Brier ice. Homan's future longtime teammate Emma Miskew was a member of Weagle's team.

In high school, Weagle skipped her Nepean High School team to a runner-up finish at the National Capital Secondary School Athletic Association championships in 2004. She lost in the final to Sir Robert Borden High School, skipped by Karen Sagle. In 2005, she lost in the Ontario Bantam final to Rachel Homan. She skipped a team out of Peterborough at the 2009 Ontario Junior Curling Championships, finishing with a 1–6 record. That year, she was given an athletic award from Trent University for her contributions to varsity and campus recreation programs for third and fourth year students.

=== Early women's ===
Weagle curled competitively in Ontario from 2004 to 2019, playing for such skips as Robyn Mattie, Brit O'Neill, Caitlin Romain and Chrissy Cadorin. Playing second for the Cadorin rink, she played in the 2018 Ontario Scotties Tournament of Hearts. The team finished with a 3–3 record.

=== Nunavut ===
At the end of the 2023–24 curling season, Nunavut curlers Sadie Pinksen, Leigh Gustafson and Alison Taylor were looking for a fourth player to join their team. Gustafson's father Jack spoke to Weagle's father, Ted about the team's dilemma, and Julia was mentioned as a possible fourth, despite having retired from competitive curling. After meeting a few times virtually, the three Nunavummiut flew south to meet Weagle to play in the Stroud Sleeman Cash Spiel Ontario Curling Tour event, where they went 1–3. Weagle flew north to practice with the team a couple of times over the next few months to prepare for the Nunavut playdowns. The team was the only rink to enter, and therefore earned the right to represent the territory at the 2025 Scotties Tournament of Hearts. Weagle would be the team's "import player" as the only player from outside Nunavut on the team. It was her first Scotties appearance.

The 2025 Hearts was the first time since 2023 that Nunavut fielded a team, as the territory had to withdraw from the 2024 Hearts due to lack of ice due to the Iqaluit Curling Club being closed for the filming of the North of North television show. The team did not have high expectations for the tournament, with Weagle saying their goals were "to represent ourselves and the territory and our sponsors, ... [and] on growing the sport in Iqaluit." Also playing at the 2025 Hearts was Weagle's sister Lisa, who was playing for Quebec. It was the fifth time that two sisters played on different teams at the Hearts, though they ultimately wouldn't play against each other. At the Hearts, Weagle led Nunavut to an 0–8 record.

== Personal life ==
Weagle works as a senior manager in guest experience at TD Place for the Ottawa Sports and Entertainment Group, where she has worked since 2020. She is married to Shane McConnell, her sister is Olympic curler Lisa Weagle, and her mother is writer Brenda Chapman. She attended Nepean High School, Trent University and Algonquin College. She previously lived in Toronto.
