= Brigitte MacPhail =

Canadian curler

- Curler
- Born: June 19, 1987 (age 39); Grand Falls, New Brunswick

Team
- Curling club: Halifax CC, Halifax, NS

Curling career
- Member Association: New Brunswick (2006–2007); Nova Scotia (2007–2021); Nunavut (2021–2023)
- Hearts: 2 (2022, 2023)
- Top CTRS ranking: 64th (2018–19)

Brigitte MacPhail (born June 19, 1987, in Grand Falls, New Brunswick) is a Canadian curler from Halifax, Nova Scotia.

== Career ==
MacPhail made one appearance at the Canadian Junior Curling Championships, playing lead for the New Brunswick Mary Jane McGuire rink. At the 2007 Canadian Junior Curling Championships, the team finished in ninth place with a 6–6 record.

After taking multiple seasons off, MacPhail joined the Christie Gamble rink for the 2015–16 season with Kaitlyn Veitch at second and Mary Mattatall at lead. The team did not have a great season on tour, failing to qualify for the playoffs in any of their five events. They finished with a 3–4 record at the 2016 Nova Scotia Scotties Tournament of Hearts. The team fared much better the following season on tour, reaching the final of the Jim Sullivan Curling Classic and the quarterfinals of the New Scotland Clothing Ladies Cashspiel. Despite their tour season, Team Gamble finished with a 2–5 record at the 2017 Nova Scotia Scotties Tournament of Hearts.

With Gamble moving to Saskatchewan following the season, MacPhail and Veitch joined Team Colleen Pinkney with Mary Myketyn-Driscoll throwing fourth rocks and Michelle MacDonald as their alternate. The team was able to find some success on tour, reaching the semifinals of both the New Scotland Clothing Ladies Cashspiel and the Dave Jones Stanhope Simpson Insurance Mayflower Cashspiel. At the 2018 Nova Scotia Scotties Tournament of Hearts, the team finished in seventh with a 3–4 record. Pinkney left the team following the season and Myketyn-Driscoll took over as skip of the team. On tour, they made the final of the New Scotland Clothing Ladies Cashspiel, semifinals of The Curling Store Cashspiel and quarterfinals of the Tim Hortons Spitfire Arms Cash Spiel. The team once again finished in seventh at the 2019 Nova Scotia Scotties Tournament of Hearts, this time with a 2–5 record. During the 2019–20 season, Team Myketyn-Driscoll missed the playoffs in all five of their tour events. They would have their best showing at the 2020 Nova Scotia Scotties Tournament of Hearts, finishing in fifth place with a 3–4 record.

For the 2021–22 season, MacPhail took over skipping the Nunavut Women's team of Sadie Pinksen, Kaitlin MacDonald and Alison Taylor. MacPhail remained in Halifax, and played with the team as their designated out-of-province curler. The team represented Nunavut at the 2022 Scotties Tournament of Hearts, finishing with a winless 0–8 record. The following season, Team MacPhail played in four tour events, failing to qualify for the playoffs at all four. At the 2023 Scotties Tournament of Hearts, the team again went 0–8, placing last.

== Personal life ==
MacPhail works as a chiropractor at Choice Health Centre/Maritime Chiropractic & Wellness. She is married to Alex Campbell. She began curling at the age of 9.

== Teams ==
Season	Skip	Third	Second	Lead
2006–07	Mary Jane McGuire	Megan McGuire	Erika Nabuurs	Brigitte MacPhail
2015–16	Christie Gamble	Brigitte MacPhail	Kaitlyn Veitch	Mary Mattatall
2016–17	Christie Gamble	Brigitte MacPhail	Kaitlyn Veitch	Michelle Lang
2017–18	Mary Myketyn-Driscoll (Fourth)	Brigitte MacPhail	Kaitlyn Veitch	Colleen Pinkney (Skip)
2018–19	Mary Myketyn-Driscoll	Brigitte MacPhail	Kaitlyn Veitch	Michelle McDonald
2019–20	Mary Myketyn-Driscoll	Jessica Daigle	Brigitte MacPhail	Kaitlyn Veitch
2020–21	Jessica Daigle	Brigitte MacPhail	Lindsey Burgess	Kaitlin Fralic
2021–22	Brigitte MacPhail	Sadie Pinksen	Kaitlin MacDonald	Alison Taylor
2022–23	Brigitte MacPhail	Sadie Pinksen	Kaitlin MacDonald	Alison Taylor
