= Alison Taylor (curler) =

Canadian curler

- Curler
- Born: March 12, 1987 (age 39); North York, Ontario

Team
- Curling club: Iqaluit CC, Iqaluit, NU
- Skip: Lauren Mann
- Third: Sadie Pinksen
- Second: Leigh Gustafson
- Lead: Alison Taylor

Curling career
- Member Association: Nunavut
- Hearts: 4 (2022, 2023, 2025, 2026)

Alison Taylor (born March 12, 1987) is a Canadian curler from Iqaluit, Nunavut. She currently plays lead on Team Lauren Mann.

== Career ==
Taylor represented Nunavut at two Canadian Curling Club Championships in 2018 and 2021. At the 2018 Travelers Curling Club Championship, her team skipped by Chantelle Mason finished the round robin with a 1–5 record. Three years later at the 2021 Canadian Curling Club Championships, she once again finished 1–5 playing second for Denise Hutchings. Also during the 2021–22 season, Taylor joined the Nunavut women's team of Brigitte MacPhail, Sadie Pinksen and Kaitlin MacDonald to compete in the 2022 Scotties Tournament of Hearts. MacPhail lives in Halifax, Nova Scotia, and played with the team as their designated out-of-province curler. The team finished with a winless 0–8 record at the national championship. The following season, Team MacPhail played in four tour events, failing to qualify for the playoffs at all four. At the 2023 Scotties Tournament of Hearts, the team again went 0–8, placing last.

== Personal life ==
Taylor works as a senior legislative and policy analyst for the Government of Nunavut.

== Teams ==
| Season | Skip | Third | Second | Lead |
|---|---|---|---|---|
| 2018–19 | Chantelle Mason | Alison Griffin | Carmen Kootoo | Alison Taylor |
| 2021–22 | Denise Hutchings | Megan Ingram | Alison Taylor | Aloka Wijesooriya |
| 2021–22 | Brigitte MacPhail | Sadie Pinksen | Kaitlin MacDonald | Alison Taylor |
| 2022–23 | Brigitte MacPhail | Sadie Pinksen | Kaitlin MacDonald | Alison Taylor |
| 2024–25 | Julia Weagle | Sadie Pinksen | Leigh Gustafson | Alison Taylor |
| 2025–26 | Julia Weagle | Sadie Pinksen | Leigh Gustafson | Alison Taylor |
| 2026–27 | Lauren Mann | Sadie Pinksen | Leigh Gustafson | Alison Taylor |
