= Christianne West =

Canadian curler

- Curler
- Born: February 1, 1999 (age 27); Iqaluit, Northwest Territories, Canada

Team
- Curling club: Iqaluit CC, Iqaluit, Nunavut

Curling career
- Member Association: Nunavut
- Hearts: 1 (2018)
Medal record
Representing Nunavut
Arctic Winter Games
Bronze medal – third place	2018 South Slave

Christianne West (born February 1, 1999) is a Canadian curler from Iqaluit, Nunavut. She currently plays third on Team Sadie Pinksen.

== Career ==
West played in eight Canadian Junior Curling Championships from 2013 to 2020 as third for Sadie Pinksen. Her best finish was a 2–7 record in 2016, 2018 and 2020. She also represented Nunavut at the 2015 Canada Winter Games, finishing in eleventh with a 2–6 record. In 2018, she won a bronze medal at the 2018 Arctic Winter Games.

While still in juniors, West got to participate in the 2018 Scotties Tournament of Hearts as the alternate for the Amie Shackleton rink. Originally listed as the team's alternate, West played in seven of the team's eight games and the team finished in last place with an 0–8 record.

== Personal life ==
West is currently a child studies student at Carleton University.

== Teams ==
Season	Skip	Third	Second	Lead
2012–13	Sadie Pinksen	Christianne West	Katie Chislett-Manning	Emily Matthews
2013–14	Sadie Pinksen	Christianne West	Katie Chislett-Manning	Emily Matthews
2014–15	Sadie Pinksen	Christianne West	Katie Chislett-Manning	Kaitlin MacDonald
2015–16	Sadie Pinksen	Christianne West	Kaitlin MacDonald	Melicia Elizaga
2016–17	Sadie Pinksen	Christianne West	Kaitlin MacDonald	Melicia Elizaga
2017–18	Sadie Pinksen	Christianne West	Kaitlin MacDonald	Melicia Elizaga
2018–19	Sadie Pinksen	Christianne West	Kaitlin MacDonald	Abigail Atienza
2019–20	Sadie Pinksen	Christianne West	Kaitlin MacDonald	Lena Chown
