= Sadie Pinksen =

Canadian curler

- Curler
- Born: January 11, 2000 (age 26); Iqaluit, Nunavut, Canada

Team
- Curling club: Iqaluit CC, Iqaluit, NU
- Skip: Lauren Mann
- Third: Sadie Pinksen
- Second: Leigh Gustafson
- Lead: Alison Taylor
- Mixed doubles partner: David Aglukark

Curling career
- Member Association: Nunavut
- Hearts: 9 (2016, 2017, 2019 2020, 2021, 2022, 2023, 2025, 2026)
- Top CTRS ranking: 100th (2019–20)
Medal record
Representing Nunavut
Arctic Winter Games
Bronze medal – third place	2018 South Slave

Sadie Wren Pinksen (born January 11, 2000) is a Canadian curler from Ottawa. She currently plays third on Team Lauren Mann.

== Career ==
Pinksen skipped Team Nunavut at eight Canadian Junior Curling Championships from 2013 to 2020. Her best finish was a 2–7 record in 2016, 2018 and 2020. She also represented Nunavut at the 2015 Canada Winter Games, finishing in eleventh with a 2–6 record. In 2018, she won a bronze medal at the 2018 Arctic Winter Games.

While still in juniors, Pinksen was asked to be the alternate for the Nunavut team at the 2016 and 2017 Scotties Tournament of Hearts, Canada's national women's curling championship. In both years, the team failed to reach the main draw after losing out in the pre-qualifying tournament. Pinksen was also supposed to be the alternate for the team at the 2018 event but had to pull out due to a scheduling conflict. She lost in the playdowns of the 2019 event skipping her own rink but was asked to be the alternate once again by the Jennifer Blaney rink. Pinksen was listed as the teams alternate at the 2019 Scotties Tournament of Hearts, but threw lead stones during the round robin, replacing Megan Ingram. They finished with a 1–6 record. The following season, Pinksen, Alison Griffin and Kaitlin MacDonald teamed up with Ontario curler Lori Eddy for the 2020 Scotties Tournament of Hearts. Despite Eddy living in Ontario, she was added to the team as the territory's "import player", after being asked by Griffin. The team automatically qualified for the Scotties as no other team in the Territory decided to challenge them. The team finished with a 2–5 record, including a surprise win against Northern Ontario's Krista McCarville. Team Eddy represented Nunavut again the following year at the 2021 Scotties Tournament of Hearts, where they finished with a winless 0–8 record.

Brigitte MacPhail joined the team for the 2021–22 season as their out-of-province player, replacing Eddy at the skip position. The team represented Nunavut at the 2022 Scotties Tournament of Hearts, finishing with a winless 0–8 record. The following season, Team MacPhail played in four tour events, failing to qualify for the playoffs at all four. At the 2023 Scotties Tournament of Hearts, the team again went 0–8, placing last.

Pinksen has also competed at two Canadian Mixed Curling Championships, finishing winless at both the 2018 and 2019 events.

== Personal life ==
Pinksen attended the University of Ottawa as a Communications and sociology student, and attended Dalhousie University as a management and philosophy student She started curling when she was seven years old. She is currently employed as a researcher.

== Teams ==
Season	Skip	Third	Second	Lead
2012–13	Sadie Pinksen	Christianne West	Katie Chislett-Manning	Emily Matthews
2013–14	Sadie Pinksen	Christianne West	Katie Chislett-Manning	Emily Matthews
2014–15	Sadie Pinksen	Christianne West	Katie Chislett-Manning	Kaitlin MacDonald
2015–16	Sadie Pinksen	Christianne West	Kaitlin MacDonald	Melicia Elizaga
2016–17	Sadie Pinksen	Christianne West	Kaitlin MacDonald	Melicia Elizaga
2017–18	Sadie Pinksen	Christianne West	Kaitlin MacDonald	Melicia Elizaga
2018–19	Sadie Pinksen	Christianne West	Kaitlin MacDonald	Abigail Atienza
2019–20	Sadie Pinksen	Christianne West	Kaitlin MacDonald	Lena Chown
2019–20	Lori Eddy	Sadie Pinksen	Alison Griffin	Kaitlin MacDonald
2020–21	Lori Eddy	Sadie Pinksen	Alison Griffin	Kaitlin MacDonald
2021–22	Brigitte MacPhail	Sadie Pinksen	Kaitlin MacDonald	Alison Taylor
2022–23	Brigitte MacPhail	Sadie Pinksen	Kaitlin MacDonald	Alison Taylor
2024–25	Julia Weagle	Sadie Pinksen	Leigh Gustafson	Alison Taylor
2025–26	Julia Weagle	Sadie Pinksen	Leigh Gustafson	Alison Taylor
2026–27	Lauren Mann	Sadie Pinksen	Leigh Gustafson	Alison Taylor
