= Kaitlin MacDonald =

Canadian curler

- Curler
- Born: November 26, 1998 (age 27); Brantford, Ontario

Team
- Curling club: Iqaluit CC, Iqaluit, NU

Curling career
- Member Association: Nunavut
- Hearts: 4 (2020, 2021, 2022, 2023)
- Top CTRS ranking: 100th (2019–20)

Kaitlin MacDonald (born November 26, 1998, in Brantford, Ontario) is a Canadian curler from Iqaluit, Nunavut.

== Career ==
During her junior career, MacDonald competed in six Canadian Junior Curling Championships from 2015 to 2020 with skip Sadie Pinksen. The teams best finish was a 2–7 record in 2016, 2018 and 2020. They also represented Nunavut at the 2015 Canada Winter Games, finishing in eleventh with a 2–6 record.

In 2020, MacDonald, Pinksen and Alison Griffin teamed up with Ontario curler Lori Eddy for the 2020 Scotties Tournament of Hearts. Despite Eddy living in Ontario, she was added to the team as the territory's "import player", after being asked by Griffin. The team automatically qualified for the Scotties as no other team in the Territory decided to challenge them. The team finished with a 2–5 record, including a surprise win against Northern Ontario's Krista McCarville. Team Eddy represented Nunavut again the following year at the 2021 Scotties Tournament of Hearts, where they finished with a winless 0–8 record. Brigitte MacPhail joined the team for the 2021–22 season as their out-of-province player, replacing Eddy at the skip position. The team represented Nunavut at the 2022 Scotties Tournament of Hearts, finishing with a winless 0–8 record. The following season, Team MacPhail played in four tour events, failing to qualify for the playoffs at all four. At the 2023 Scotties Tournament of Hearts, the team again went 0–8, placing last.

== Personal life ==
MacDonald took accounting at the University of Prince Edward Island. She currently works as a finance officer for the Government of Nunavut.

== Teams ==
Season	Skip	Third	Second	Lead
2014–15	Sadie Pinksen	Christianne West	Katie Chislett-Manning	Kaitlin MacDonald
2015–16	Sadie Pinksen	Christianne West	Kaitlin MacDonald	Melicia Elizaga
2016–17	Sadie Pinksen	Christianne West	Kaitlin MacDonald	Melicia Elizaga
2017–18	Sadie Pinksen	Christianne West	Kaitlin MacDonald	Melicia Elizaga
2018–19	Sadie Pinksen	Christianne West	Kaitlin MacDonald	Abigail Atienza
2019–20	Sadie Pinksen	Christianne West	Kaitlin MacDonald	Lena Chown
2019–20	Lori Eddy	Sadie Pinksen	Alison Griffin	Kaitlin MacDonald
2020–21	Lori Eddy	Sadie Pinksen	Alison Griffin	Kaitlin MacDonald
2021–22	Brigitte MacPhail	Sadie Pinksen	Kaitlin MacDonald	Alison Taylor
2022–23	Brigitte MacPhail	Sadie Pinksen	Kaitlin MacDonald	Alison Taylor
