= List of teams in the 2021–22 curling season =

Following is a list of teams that competed during the 2021–22 curling season.

== Men ==
As of May 19, 2022

| Skip | Third | Second | Lead | Alternate | Locale |
|---|---|---|---|---|---|
| Jason Ackerman | Brent Gedak | Derek Owens | Curtis Horwath | | Regina, Saskatchewan |
| Jerôme Adam | Philippe Simard | Olivier Blanchard-Pelletier | Justin Adam | | Quebec, Quebec |
| Rob Ainsley | Dave Ellis | Graeme Robson | Darren Karn | | Toronto, Ontario |
| Alexey Timofeev (Fourth) | Artur Ali (Skip) | Alexey Tuzov | Artur Razhabov | | Moscow, Russia |
| Nasser Alyafei | Abdulraham Mohsen | Mouaaz Mlis | Mohammed Al-Keldi | | Doha, Qatar |
| Valentin Anghelinei | Răzvan Bouleanu | Cezar Postelnicu | Marius Mazilu | | Romania |
| Sam Antila | Rylan Young | Jeff Antila | Ian Graham | Alex Sutherland | Thompson, Manitoba |
| Go Aoki | Kokui Ogiwara | Kazushi Niino | Ayato Sasaki | Kei Kamado | Sapporo, Japan |
| Ted Appelman | Nathan Connolly | Kevin Tym | Eric Richard | | Edmonton, Alberta |
| Lars Aspeli | Njal Kongsund | Harald Dæhlin | Heine Buraas | | Lillehammer, Norway |
| Dimitri Audibert | James Trahan | Raphael Tremblay | Simon Laroche | | Alma, Quebec |
| James Ballance | Chris Pratt | Ethan Drysdale | Neil Donovan | | Okotoks, Alberta |
| Christian Bangerter | Daniel Inversini | Kim-Lloyd Sciboz | Antoine Liaudet | | Bern, Switzerland |
| Jesús Barajas | Ramy Cohen | Chris Barajas | Alex Sánchez | | Mexico City, Mexico |
| Dmitryi Barkan | Dzimitry Rudnitski | Mikalai Kryshtopa | Aleksej Chubarov | | Minsk, Belarus |
| Ante Baus | Bruno Samardzic | Miroslav Jurkovic | Vedran Horvat | Drazen Cutic | Croatia |
| Alek Bédard | Louis Quevillon | Émile Asselin | Bradley Lequin | | Montreal, Quebec |
| Brett Behm | Brendan Ross | Daniel Mutlow | Ian Howell | | Regina, Saskatchewan |
| Sylvain Bellavance | Andre Bellavance | Dan Gilbert | Andre Gange | | Boucherville, Quebec |
| Dave Belway | David Long | Darin Gerow | Marc Fillion | | Salmon Arm, British Columbia |
| Alex Benoy | Philippe Giltaire | Michael Isenor | Alijaz Pengov Bitenc | Lukas Jirousek | Luxembourg |
| Arild Berdal | Sigmund Ellingson | Svein Nordlomme | Sverre Heimdal | Håkon Dahlen | Trondheim, Norway |
| Daymond Bernath | Bryden Tessier | David Baum | Jack Reid | | Saskatoon, Saskatchewan |
| Roger Bertrand | Martin Patry | Rick LaBonte | Luc Ouellette | | Buckingham, Quebec |
| Alex Bérubé | Garth Winfield | Geoffrey Reid | David Maheux | | Mont-Bruno, Quebec |
| Paulo Bienvenue | Jocelyn Lavoie | Pierre Bienvenue | Yan Morissette | | Val-d'Or, Quebec |
| Matt Bijl | Adam Rintoul | Ethan Brandt | Avery Skog | | Winnipeg, Manitoba |
| Daniel Birchard | Kelly Fordyce | Brody Moore | Andrew Peck | | Winnipeg, Manitoba |
| Steven Birklid | Sam Galey | Erik Quistgaard | Matt Birklid | Daniel Plys | (United States) Seattle, Washington |
| Louis Biron | Dan Lemery | Luc St-Lacques | François Charron | | Buckingham, Quebec |
| Todd Birr | Brady Clark | Jason Smith | Tom O'Connor | | (United States) Blaine, Minnesota |
| Jamie Birtwistle | Brent Flaman | Stuart Jobb | Alex Porter | | Ottawa, Ontario |
| Kjetil Bjørke | Tor Fredriksen | Håvard Lundhaug | Sonny Lodin | | Bygdøy, Norway |
| Pier-Olivier Blain | Alexander Lanteigne | Frederic Villiard | Patrick Doyon | | Sorel-Tracy, Quebec |
| Trevor Bonot | Mike McCarville | Jordan Potter | Jordan Potts | | Thunder Bay, Ontario |
| Gregory Bornais | Oliver Roberge | Samuel Bornais | François Bornais | | Quebec City, Quebec |
| Brendan Bottcher | Pat Janssen | Brad Thiessen | Karrick Martin | | Edmonton, Alberta |
| Julian Bowling | Shawn Dragon | Tasir Bhuiyan | Ian Gau | | Yellowknife, Northwest Territories |
| Mathias Brænden | Michael Mellemseter | Grunde Morten Buraas | Andreas Hårstad | | Trondheim, Norway |
| Stuart Brand | Fraser Clark | Martin Gregory | Daniel Arrandale | | Kent, England |
| Zachary Brenden | Cayden Kraft | Owen Nelson | Kyan Ponzio | | (United States) Bismarck, North Dakota |
| Greg Bridges | Korey Donnelly | Richard Cooper | Derek Picketts | | Russell, Ontario |
| Jed Brundidge | Evan Workin | Lance Wheeler | Cameron Rittenour | Nic Wagner | (United States) Saint Paul, Minnesota |
| Bryan Bruneau | Trevor Brewer | Stephen Bruneau | Jason Botting | Dante Battilana | Brighton, Ontario |
| Carter Bryant | Codie Harris | Nolan Bryant | Dylan Byrne | | London, Ontario |
| Cameron Bryce | Callum Kinnear | Mark Taylor | Robin McCall | | Stirling, Scotland |
| Josh Bryden | Adam Bukurak | James Hom | Ethan Coleman | | Regina, Saskatchewan |
| Alexandr Burdakov | Nikita Kuznetsov | Alexandr Gapanchuk | Maxim Buylov | | Moscow, Russia |
| Dallas Burgess | Jackson Dubinsky | Matt Duizer | Brayden Sinclair | | Kakabeka Falls, Ontario |
| Kinley Burton | Justice Jacques | Oliver Burton | Cole Rivard | | Edmonton, Alberta |
| Lance Bussieres | Duncan Sproule | Nick Mitsopoulos | Kris Mitsopoulos | | Fort McMurray, Alberta |
| Ted Butler | Richard Faguy | Jean Pierre Croteau | Michel Laroche | | Buckingham, Quebec |
| Braden Calvert | Kyle Kurz | Ian McMillan | Rob Gordon | | Winnipeg, Manitoba |
| Mac Calwell | Matt Pretty | Kurt Armstrong | Morgan Calwell | Riley Calwell | Ottawa, Ontario |
| Gavin Cameron | Chris Morris | Lewis Logan | David Beesley | | Moray, Scotland |
| Jason Camm | Matthew Hall | Cameron Goodkey | Jordie Lyon-Hatcher | | Navan, Ontario |
| Kory Carr | Tyler Stewart | Travis Potter | Jamie Childs | | Thunder Bay, Ontario |
| Orrin Carson | Logan Carson | Archie Hyslop | Charlie Gibb | | Dumfries, Scotland |
| Michael Carss | Tyler Travis | Aaron Shutra | Lyndon Holm | | Saskatoon, Saskatchewan |
| Daniel Casper | Ethan Sampson | Samuel Strouse | Coleman Thurston | Marius Kleinas | (United States) Chaska, Minnesota |
| Daniel Laufer (Fourth) | Nicholas Cenzalli (Skip) | Connor Hardin | Shaheen Bassiri | | (United States) Wayland, Massachusetts |
| Vít Chabičovský | David Jákl | Marek Bříza | Matyáš Votava | | Prague, Czech Republic |
| Corey Chambers | Julien Leduc | Devon Wiebe | Stuart Shiells | | Winnipeg, Manitoba |
| Alex Champ | Charlie Richard | Terry Arnold | Scott Clinton | | Kitchener–Waterloo, Ontario |
| Jason Chang | Justin Chen | Woody Cheng | Harry Yew | | Hong Kong |
| Joel Charbonneau | Richard Kochan | Patrick Marchildon | James MacDonald | | Amos, Quebec |
| Ethan Macomber (Fourth) | Andy Charles (Skip) | Bennett Donovan | Max Petitjean | | (United States) Portage, Wisconsin |
| Joseph Charles | Emmett Benck | Adam Hein | Noah Jahn | | (United States) Portage, Wisconsin |
| Greg Cheal | Simon-Olivier Hebert | Zach Griffiths | James Trahan | | Lennoxville, Quebec |
| Choi Won-yeong | Kim Hyo-jun | Kim Jin-hun | Lee Jun-hwa | Kim Min-je | Uiseong, South Korea |
| Ethan Chung | Chase Lozinsky | Hunter Reese | Curtis Sommers | | St. Albert, Alberta |
| Ryan Church | Rory Klauber | William Waite | Connor Hardin | Andrew Picard | (United States) Cape Cod, Massachusetts |
| Richard Clark | David Thompson | Brent Diduck | Tyler Spritzer | | Fort McMurray, Alberta |
| Giacomo Colli | Alberto Zisa | Francesco De Zanna | Edoardo Alfonsi | | Trentino, Italy |
| Cameron MacKenzie (Fourth) | Travis Colter (Skip) | Ian Juurlink | Robby McLean | | Halifax, Nova Scotia |
| Rene Comeau | Adam Freilich | Colton Daly | Ed Moore | | Fredericton, New Brunswick |
| Nicholas Connolly | Kyle Kakela | Timothy Hodek | Nathan Perry | | (United States) Pittsburgh, Pennsylvania |
| Patrick Connolly | Nicholas Visnich | Sean Mizerski | Alex Visnich | | (United States) Pittsburgh, Pennsylvania |
| Brandon Corbett | Derek Corbett | Evan Jensen | Aaron Carlson | | (United States) Rochester, New York |
| Beau Cornelson | Adam Naugler | Sawer Kaeser | Joe Brigley | | Edmonton, Alberta |
| Jim Cotter | Tyrel Griffith | Andrew Nerpin | Rick Sawatsky | | Vernon, British Columbia |
| Vincent Courteau | Jeremie Marcil-Blais | Ted Decontle | Dany Beaudoin | | Gatineau, Quebec |
| Andrew Cowell | Kaiden Beck | Ryan Cowell | Austin Tomlinson | | Salmon Arm, British Columbia |
| James Craik | Angus Bryce | Scott Hyslop | Niall Ryder | | Stirling, Scotland |
| Ross Craik | Fraser Swanston | Jake MacDonald | Jonathan Blair | | Forfar, Scotland |
| Bruno Crepeault | Pascal Fradette | Mario Lafrenière | Yannick Letourneau | | Val-d'Or, Quebec |
| Warren Cross | Tyler Pfiffer | Morgan Van Doesburg | Mike Lambert | | Edmonton, Alberta |
| Dan Crouse | David DeAdder | Samuel Forestell | Mike Allain | | Moncton, New Brunswick |
| Paul Cseke | Corey Chester | Jay Wakefield | Ryan Cassidy | | Victoria, British Columbia |
| Jure Čulić | Tomas Tisler | Gasper Ursic | Jost Lajovec | Gregor Verbinc | Slovenia |
| Kristóf Czermann | Lőrinc Tatár | Ottó Kalocsay | Callum MacFarlane | Dávid Balázs | Budapest, Hungary |
| Michael Dahms | Dave Brand | Tyler Gritten | J. R. Falzetta | | Airdrie, Alberta |
| Rajan Dalrymple | John Siddall | Jacob Nowlan | Cameron Sallaj | | Oromocto, New Brunswick |
| Neil Dangerfield | Dennis Sutton | Darren Boden | Connar Croteau | Chris Atchison | Victoria, British Columbia |
| Claude DaPrato | Sylvain Poirier | Gabriel Fleurent | Peter Britt | | Gatineau, Quebec |
| Robert Daudet | Ryan Miller | Craig Ross | Mark Lawson | Cory Boisvert | Winnipeg, Manitoba |
| Flemming Davanger | Bent Ånund Ramsfjell | Espen de Lange | Morten Tveit | Robert Wood | Akershus, Norway |
| Zach Davies | Kolby MacDonald | Terren Algot | Lucas Sawiak | | Edmonton, Alberta |
| Benoît Schwarz (Fourth) | Sven Michel | Peter de Cruz (Skip) | Valentin Tanner | | Geneva, Switzerland |
| Cameron de Jong | Andrew Komlodi | Matt Tolley | John Slattery | | Penticton, British Columbia |
| Josh Miki (Fourth) | Connor Deane (Skip) | MacKenzie Ellis | Brenin Moore | | New Westminster, British Columbia |
| Ryan Deis | Garret Springer | Dustin Mikush | Kalin Deis | Dallan Muyres | Fox Valley, Saskatchewan |
| D'arcy Delorey | Patrick Cove | Glenn Smith | Bruce Power | Michael Rowe | Hay River, Northwest Territories |
| Daniel Deng | Matthew Fenton | Bryan Yamada | Zander Landygo | | New Westminster, British Columbia |
| Robert Desjardins | François Gionest | Pierre-Luc Morissette | Marc-Alexandre Dion | | Saguenay, Quebec |
| Paul Dexter | Bryce Everist | Chris MacRae | Taylor Ardiel | | Halifax, Nova Scotia |
| Richard Dick | Luke Spence | Billy-Joe Dick | Jaret Walker | | Winnipeg, Manitoba |
| Ty Dilello | William Kuran | Lucas Van Den Bosch | Brendan Wilson | Devin McArthur | Winnipeg, Manitoba |
| Danil Dmitriev | Ivan Osolodkov | Aibek Asanaliev | Muhamed Dasifu | | Bishkek, Kyrgyzstan |
| Ghislain Doyon | Jean-Yves Lemay | Sylvain Dicaire | Pierre Blanchard | | Val-d'Or, Quebec |
| Matthew Drewitz | Adam Drewitz | Caden Snow | Jared Tessier | | Saskatoon, Saskatchewan |
| Korey Dropkin | Joe Polo | Mark Fenner | Thomas Howell | Alex Fenson | (United States) Duluth, Minnesota |
| Jacques Dufresne | Glen Holmstead | Guy Landry | Pierre Berube | | Amos, Quebec |
| Robin Duguay | Kevin Ménard | Guillaume Boisvert | Eric Periard | | Buckingham, Quebec |
| Scott Dunnam | Hunter Clawson | Cody Clouser | Andrew Dunnam | Daniel Dudt | (United States) Philadelphia, Pennsylvania |
| Matt Dunstone | Braeden Moskowy | Kirk Muyres | Dustin Kidby | | Regina, Saskatchewan |
| Matt Dupuis | Charles Wert | Jon King | – | | Cornwall, Ontario |
| Denis Duval | Guy Grignon | Yvan Desrochers | Danny Burbridge | | Val-d'Or, Quebec |
| Cole Ector | Jared DeBernardo | Ayden Whittmire | Tyler Powell | | Calgary, Alberta |
| Logan Ede | Brayden Grindheim | Michael Hom | Austin Krupski | | Saskatoon, Saskatchewan |
| Niklas Edin | Oskar Eriksson | Rasmus Wranå | Christoffer Sundgren | | Karlstad, Sweden |
| Zach Eldridge | Chris Jeffrey | Ronnie Burgess | Brody Hanson | | Fredericton, New Brunswick |
| Johan Engqvist | Alex Palm | Imad Moussaytef | Albert Berglund | | Härnösand, Sweden |
| John Epping | Ryan Fry | Mat Camm | Brent Laing | | Toronto, Ontario |
| Johnny Eriksson | Karl Nordlund | Pea Andersson | Markus Sund | | Sala, Sweden |
| Jimmy Evans | Elias Vargas | Robert Borland | Tyler Skaggs | Dylan Skaggs | (United States) Fairbanks, Alaska |
| Gábor Észöl | Balázs Fóti | Támas Szabad | Balázs Varga | | Budapest, Hungary |
| Adam Fenton | Alex Duncan-Wu | Matthew Fenton | Wesley Wu | | New Westminster, British Columbia |
| Pat Ferris | Ian Dickie | Connor Duhaime | Zack Shurtleff | | Grimsby, Ontario |
| Alexey Filippov | Gleb Yambulatov | Dmitry Gretskiy | Yuri Shustrov | | Dmitrov, Russia |
| Colton Flasch | Catlin Schneider | Kevin Marsh | Dan Marsh | | Saskatoon, Saskatchewan |
| Paul Flemming | Scott Saccary | Ryan Abraham | Phil Crowell | | Halifax, Nova Scotia |
| Félix Asselin (Fourth) | Martin Crête | Mike Fournier (Skip) | Jean-François Trépanier | | Montreal, Quebec |
| Graham Freeman | Brooks Freeman | Jace Freeman | Dwayne Barkley | Kevin Barkley | Virden, Manitoba |
| Jace Freeman | Ryan Ostrowsky | Cyrus Brandt | Andrew McKay | | Virden, Manitoba |
| Rhett Friesz | Gord Copithorne | Ben Savage | Ky Macaulay | Kevin Folk | Airdrie, Alberta |
| Alastair Fyfe | Munir Albeelbisi | Hussain Hagawi | Suleiman Alaqel | | Riyadh, Saudi Arabia |
| Benoit Gagné | Vincent Fortin | Xavier Roy | Mathieu Paquet | | Quebec, Quebec |
| Jakub Červenka (Fourth) | Juraj Gallo (Skip) | Tomáš Pitoňák | Peter Pitoňák | | Bratislava, Slovakia |
| Ben Gamble | Braydan Mohns | Tyler Krupski | Rory McCusker | | Regina, Saskatchewan |
| Josep Garcia | Enric Morral | Cesar Mialdea | Valentin Ortiz | | Andorra |
| Chris Gardner | Brian Vance | Keith Couthard | Nick Catizone | | Ottawa, Ontario |
| Jacques Gauthier | Jordan Peters | Brayden Payette | Cole Chandler | | Winnipeg, Manitoba |
| Sean Geall | Brad Wood | Steve Kopf | Andrew Bilesky | | New Westminster, British Columbia |
| Mathias Genner | Jonas Backofen | Martin Reichel | Lukas Kirchmair | | Kitzbühel, Austria |
| Andrew Gibson | Mike Flemming | Mike Bardsley | – | | Halifax, Nova Scotia |
| Jeff Ginter | Dean Darwent | Steven Byrne | Darcy Hafso | | Dawson Creek, British Columbia |
| Chris Glibota | Dan Mick | Matt Mann | Marc Barrette | | Sault Ste. Marie, Ontario |
| Sergey Glukhov | Dmitry Mironov | Evgeny Klimov | Anton Kalalb | | Moscow, Russia |
| Dale Goehring | Jeff Phenix | Fred Edwards | Andrew Brotherhood | | Calgary, Alberta |
| Mikhail Golikov | Grigory Lavrov | Andrey Shestopalov | Dmitry Sirotkin | | Moscow, Russia |
| Colton Goller | Warren Kozak | James Keats | Dwayne Romanchuk | | Airdrie, Alberta |
| Lars Göthberg | Joakim Mabergs | Mats Mabergs | Andreas Rangedal | | Malung, Sweden |
| Brady Gould | Brett Kubricht | Jake Ennis | Ryan Smith | David Nichols | (United States) Charlotte, North Carolina |
| Jake Goves | Ben Pearce | Sean McCloskey | Connor Lund | Evan Mott | London, Ontario |
| Harry Gow | Jamie Rankin | Kyle McLain | Callum McLain | | Borders, Scotland |
| Tanner Graham | Josh Evans | Carter Malmquist | Rylan Graham | | Petersfield, Manitoba |
| Simon Granbom | Axel Sjöberg | Fabian Wingfors | Jacob Hanna | | Stockholm, Sweden |
| Sean Grassie | Tyler Drews | Daryl Evans | Rodney Legault | | Winnipeg, Manitoba |
| James Grattan | Darren Moulding | Paul Dobson | Andy McCann | Jamie Brannen | Oromocto, New Brunswick |
| Mathieu Gravel | Serge St-Germain | Pier Luc Laplante | Mathieu Cole | | Val-d'Or, Quebec |
| Eric Greavette | Robert Taylor | Preston Hughes | – | | Collingwood, Ontario |
| Colin Griffith | Dale Venning | Dillon Venning | Bodie Venning | | Grande Prairie, Alberta |
| Jason Gunnlaugson | Adam Casey | Matt Wozniak | Connor Njegovan | | Morris, Manitoba |
| Brad Gushue | Mark Nichols | Brett Gallant | Geoff Walker | | St. John's, Newfoundland and Labrador |
| Josh Hales | Kevin Macmichael | Connor Heideman | Loris Elliott | | Sault Ste. Marie, Ontario |
| David Hamblin | Kevin Hamblin | Kris Mazinke | Rheal Vermette | | Morris, Manitoba |
| Kalem Hamilton | Kevin Hawkshaw | Joseph Trieu | Stephen Hood | | Edmonton, Alberta |
| Glen Hansen | Doug McLennan | Douglas Marks | George Parsons | | Edmonton, Alberta |
| Justin Harcourt | Daniel Moerike | Gavin Fleck | Brayden Heistad | | Humboldt, Saskatchewan |
| Andreas Hårstad | Michael Mellemseter | Marcus Wolan | Emil M. Kvål | | Oppdal, Norway |
| Kody Hartung | Tyler Hartung | Jayden Shwaga | Brady Kendel | | Saskatoon, Saskatchewan |
| Jeremy Harty | Kyler Kleibrink | Joshua Kiist | Kurtis Goller | | Calgary, Alberta |
| Mikael Hasselborg | Gerry Wåhlin | Mats Wranå | Anders Eriksson | | Sundbyberg, Sweden |
| Caden Hebert | Jack Bestland | Hans Nielsen | Benji Paral | Jack Wendtland | (United States) Eau Claire, Wisconsin |
| Ethan Hebert | William Gerlach | Shaheen Bassiri | Nicholas Cenzalli | Daniel Laufer | (United States) Lowell, Massachusetts |
| Brad Heidt | Mitch Heidt | Regis Neumeier | Derek Schneider | | Kindersley, Saskatchewan |
| Josh Heidt | Brad Heidt | Matt Lang | Mark Lang | | Kindersley, Saskatchewan |
| Wayne Heikkinen | Chris Heikkinen | Corey Van Engelen | Matt Heikkinen | | Calgary, Alberta |
| Christian Heinimann | Felix Eberhard | Linus Imfeld | Lorenz Krammer | | Basel, Switzerland |
| Brayden Heistad | Logan Sawicki | Andy Lloyd | Ryder Helmeczi | | Saskatoon, Saskatchewan |
| Benjamin Helston | Tyler Powell | Ayden Whittmire | Colby Yacey | | Calgary, Alberta |
| Guy Hemmings | Mathieu Beaufort | Simon Benoit | Maxime Benoit | Vincent Bourget | Sorel-Tracy, Quebec |
| Carter Henry | Wesley Henry | Nolan O'Keefe | Hans Nielsen | | (United States) Portage, Wisconsin |
| Jordan Henry | Matt Mann | Jody Ritthaler | Patrick Schwartz | Justin Hurl | Prince Albert, Saskatchewan |
| Jonas Backofen (Fourth) | Matthäus Hofer | Gernot Higatzberger (Skip) | Moritz Jöchl | Johann Karg | Kitzbühel, Austria |
| Richard Hills | Mick Fletcher | Matthew Bailey | Peter Walton | Ruaraidh Whyte | Kent, England |
| Kohsuke Hirata | Shingo Usui | Ryota Meguro | Yoshiya Miura | Syunta Kobayashi | Kitami, Japan |
| Andrew Hodgson | Jared Palanuik | Blake Johnson | Dale McMillan | | Calgary, Alberta |
| Marco Hösli | Philipp Hösli | Marco Hefti | Justin Hausherr | | Glarus, Switzerland |
| Carter Holden | Noah Hawkins | Jensen Wisemen | Alex Hanrahan | | St. John's, Newfoundland and Labrador |
| Tanner Horgan | Jonathan Beuk | Wesley Forget | Scott Chadwick | Jacob Horgan | Kingston, Ontario |
| Eskild Eriksen (Fourth) | Haakon Horvli (Skip) | Hogne Lyngvold | Matias Eggen | | Oppdal, Norway |
| Elias Høstmælingen | Ådne Birketveit | Johan Høstmælingen | Eskil Vintervold | | Lillehammer, Norway |
| Lukas Høstmælingen | Grunde Morten Buraas | Magnus Lillebo | Tinius Haslev Nordbye | | Lillehammer, Norway |
| Glenn Howard | Scott Howard | David Mathers | Tim March | | Penetanguishene, Ontario |
| Steven Howard | Daniel Selke | Mat Ring | Scott Deck | | Regina, Saskatchewan |
| Dean Hürlimann | Matthieu Fague | Nicolas Romang | Jan Tanner | | Zug, Switzerland |
| Al Hutchinson | Kevin Daniel | Bruce Cox | Dave Hailburton | | Owen Sound, Ontario |
| Jack Hykaway | Joshua Harding | Graham Normand | Richard Hawkins | | Pembina, Manitoba |
| J. D. Lind (Fourth) | Tyler Lautner | Carter Lautner | Myles Immerkar (Skip) | | Calgary, Alberta |
| Greg Inglis | Evan Running | Steven Rotskas | Trey Cowell | | Carrying Place, Ontario |
| Steve Irwin | Travis Taylor | Travis Brooks | Travis Saban | | Brandon, Manitoba |
| Jan Iseli | Max Winz | Nathan Weber | Sandro Fanchini | | Solothurn, Switzerland |
| Rene Iseli | Jonas Weiss | Marcel Westtsetein | Yves Gigandet | | Aarau, Switzerland |
| Kennji Takamatu (Fourth) | Takanori Hirano | Masaki Ishikawa (Skip) | Yutaro Kasai | Kantaro Kawano | Japan |
| Juon Ishimura | Yuto Nakagawa | Youn Ishimura | Genta Kaimori | Kuya Kawamura | Japan |
| Ewan Cameron | Cameron Harkins | Rory Macnair | Aaron Ferguson | Callum Young | Stirling, Scotland |
| Brad Jacobs | Marc Kennedy | E. J. Harnden | Ryan Harnden | | Sault Ste. Marie, Ontario |
| Jason Jacobson | Dustin Kalthoff | Jacob Hersikorn | Quinn Hersikorn | | Saskatoon, Saskatchewan |
| Ryan Jacques | Desmond Young | Andrew Gittis | Gabriel Dyck | | Edmonton, Alberta |
| Dean Joanisse | Daniel Wenzek | Cody Johnston | Jeff Guignard | | Maple Ridge, British Columbia |
| Jordon Johnson | Jayden Rutter | Tim Johnson | Ryan Zapotochny | | Winnipeg, Manitoba |
| Rob Johnson | Steve Thomas | Rob Heemskerk | Andre Fagnon | | Calgary, Alberta |
| Dylan Johnston | Mike Badiuk | Chris Briand | Kurtis Byrd | Brennan Wark | Fort Frances, Ontario |
| Denis Jolin | Ghislain East | Pierre Pilon | Robert Gaudet | | Noranda, Quebec |
| Jeremy Mallais (Fourth) | Scott Jones (Skip) | Brian King | Chris Medford | | Moncton, New Brunswick |
| Shawn Joyce | Carson Ackerman | Travis Tokarz | Trevor Zurowski | | Saskatoon, Saskatchewan |
| Fredrik Julius | Johan Bergman | Jordan Wåhlin | Martin Wallee | | Sundbyberg, Sweden |
| Marc Pfister (Fourth) | Tim Jungen | Björn Jungen (Skip) | Simon Gempeler | Enrico Pfister | Bern, Switzerland |
| Ken Kanai | Ryo Yoshihara | Tatsuya Sumino | Tsutomu Asano | Hideki Yoshii | Kanagawa, Japan |
| Naoki Kanazawa | Haruto Ouchi | Takuto Ouchi | Ryo Aoki | Sota Tsuruga | Sapporo, Japan |
| Junpei Kanda | Hiromu Otani | Kizuki Ryokawa | Shotara Hashimoto | | Tokyo, Japan |
| Andy Kapp | Oliver Axnick | Holger Höhne | Andreas Kempf | | Füssen, Germany |
| Benjamin Kapp | Felix Messenzehl | Johannes Scheuerl | Magnus Sutor | | Füssen, Germany |
| Uğurcan Karagöz | Oğuzhan Karakurt | Muhammed Zeki Uçan | Orhun Yüce | Muhammet Haydar Demirel | Erzurum, Turkey |
| Hiroshi Kato | Yuto Kawada | Hayato Fujimura | Yuuki Yoshimura | Naoki Kon | Japan |
| Connor Kauffman | Sidney Harris | Jacob Zeman | Ethan Hebert | | (United States) Blaine, Minnesota |
| David Kaun | Marc Bourguignon | Evangeline Fortier | Minh Nguyen | | Ottawa, Ontario |
| Harunobu Kawahira | Haruto Nakamori | Ryouta Watanabe | Syouta Tsuchiya | Kagetora Kawahira | Japan |
| Kantaro Kawano | Takanori Hirano | Kenji Takamatsu | Yutaro Kasai | Tasuya Yokota | Sapporo, Japan |
| Mark Kean | Kevin Flewwelling | Ed Cyr | Sean Harrison | | Woodstock, Ontario |
| Mike Kennedy | Terry Odishaw | Charlie Sullivan | Grant Odishaw | | Fredericton, New Brunswick |
| Steven Tersmette (Fourth) | Mitchell Young | Josh Kennelly (Skip) | Jeffrey Langin | | Salmon Arm, British Columbia |
| Conner Kent | Toby Mills | Daniel Dabiri | Michael Nunn | | Richmond, British Columbia |
| Kalle Kiiskinen | Teemu Salo | Leo Ouni | Paavo Kuosmanen | | Hyvinkää, Finland |
| Ben Kiist | Aidan Snider | Marcus Yurko | Logan Thomas | Ky Macaulay | Okotoks, Alberta |
| Kim Chang-min | Kim Soo-hyuk | Jeon Jae-ik | Kim Hak-kyun | | Uiseong, South Korea |
| Kim Hak-gyun | Park Jin-hwan | Kim Myeong-jun | Park Jong-hyeon | | Chuncheon, South Korea |
| Kim Jeong-min | Choi Chi-won | Park Se-won | Gwon Dong-geun | | Uijeongbu, South Korea |
| Kim Tae-hun | Moon Hyeon | Kwon Oh-woo | Lim Byeong-hyeon | Shim Ju-hwan | Cheongju, South Korea |
| Jamie King | Mike Jantzen | Sean Morris | Todd Brick | Wade Johnston | Calgary, Alberta |
| Max Kirkpatrick | Scott Rumpel | Mitch Minken | Greg Haney | | Swift Current, Saskatchewan |
| Rylan Kleiter | Joshua Mattern | Trevor Johnson | Matthieu Taillon | Steve Laycock | Saskatoon, Saskatchewan |
| Lukáš Klíma | Marek Černovský | Jiri Candra | Samuel Mokriš | | Prague, Czech Republic |
| Bart Klomp | Tobias van den Hurk | Alexander Magan | Simon Spits | | Zoetermeer, Netherlands |
| Kelly Knapp | Mike Armstrong | Brennen Jones | Trent Knapp | | Saskatoon, Saskatchewan |
| Oliver Kobian | Adam Podolka | David Škácha | David Verner | | Prague, Czech Republic |
| Jamie Koe | Glen Kennedy | Cole Parsons | Shadrach Mcleod | | Yellowknife, Northwest Territories |
| Kevin Koe | B. J. Neufeld | John Morris | Ben Hebert | | Calgary, Alberta |
| Kenji Komoda | Hideyuki Satoh | Keigo Ishi | Takashi Koyanagi | | Chiba, Japan |
| Chihiro Kon | Masaki Fujimura | Tetsuo Yamaguchi | Haruto Saito | Ren Kohiruimaki | Japan |
| Parker Konschuh | Craig Bourgonje | Landon Bucholz | Bryce Bucholz | | Calgary, Alberta |
| Mitchell Kopytko | Calder Fadden | Coburn Fadden | Cooper Fadden | | Kamloops, British Columbia |
| Madiyar Korabayev | Adil Zhumagozha | Aidos Alliyar | Dmitriy Garagul | Georgiy Skupnevskiy | Almaty, Kazakhstan |
| Bruce Korte | Darrell McKee | Kory Kohuch | Rory Golanowski | | Saskatoon, Saskatchewan |
| Michael Kraehenbuehl | Scott McMullan | Sergio Mitsuo Vilela | Claudio Alves | | São Paulo, Brazil |
| Anders Kraupp | Michael Vilenius | Rolf Wikström | Peter Tedenback | Mats Jansson | Danderyd, Sweden |
| Mikkel Krause | Mads Nørgård | Henrik Holtermann | Kasper Wiksten | Tobias Thune | Hvidovre, Denmark |
| Kyler Kurina | Evan Crough | Garrett Johnston | Cass Kobylnyk | | Calgary, Alberta |
| Roman Kutuzov | Artem Ivanov | Yroslav Ligarev | Stepan Kindiukov | | Moscow, Russia |
| Sigurd Svorkmo-Lundberg | Sondre Svorkmo-Lundberg | Tor-Erling Kvarner | Isak Herfjord | | Oppdal, Norway |
| Patrick Kverkild | Bjørn Tore Elvevold | Svein Østgård | Kare Brandso | | Trondheim, Norway |
| Stewart Kyle | Jay Maxwell | Jack Halliday | Owen Kennedy | | Dumfries, Scotland |
| Axel Landelius | Alfons Johansson | Olle Moberg | Pontus Persson | | Mjölby, Sweden |
| Shane Latimer | Punit Sthankiya | Brett Lyon-Hatcher | Brendan Acorn | | Ajax, Ontario |
| Ross LaVallee | Shawn Demianyk | Kayle Miller | Brian Broszeit | | Morris, Manitoba |
| Frederic Lawton | David Miles | Charles Gagnon | – | | Montreal, Quebec |
| Alexandre Leduc | François Halle | Denis Robichaud | David-Lee Amos | | Valleyfield, Quebec |
| Lee Jae-beom | Kim Eun-bin | Pyo Jeong-min | Choi Jae-hyeok | | Gyeongsan, South Korea |
| Lee Jeong-jae | Jeong Byeong-jin | Kim San | Kim Tae-hwan | | Seoul, South Korea |
| Lee Jin-wook | Seong Si-hyeon | Park Jeong-hwan | Choi Woo-yeong | | Busan, South Korea |
| Lee Ki-jeong | Park Jong-duk | Lee Ki-bok | Oh Seung-hoon | Seong Yu-jin | Gangwon, South Korea |
| Nicholas Lemieux | Ryan Fayaz | Charlie Randell | Dylan Sipura | | St. Catharines, Ontario |
| Benjamin Levy | Marcus Gleaton | Colby Novar | Stephen Imes | | (United States) Detroit, Michigan |
| Jacob Libbus | Riley Helston | Michael Dumont | Michael Henricks | Zachary Pawliuk | Okotoks, Alberta |
| Lin Ting-li | Nelson Wang | Yin Liu Luis | Cheng Kai-wen | | Taiwan, Chinese Taipei |
| Nolan Lindberg | Colton Jones | Daniel Moerike | Evan Lalonde | | Moose Jaw, Saskatchewan |
| Tobias Linneberg | Jonas Volla | Jakob Moen Bekken | Olav Flaekoei | | Hedmarken, Norway |
| Kaleb Lis | Ethan Martin | Sean Kirkland | Owen Pacholok | | Edmonton, Alberta |
| Derek Lockwood | Steven Lang | Adam Osseyrane | Shel Cohen | | Montreal, Quebec |
| Mark Longworth | Dean Mackney | Greg Hamilton | Ron McDougall | | Vernon, British Columbia |
| Mark Lukowich | Sheldon Oshanyk | Chris Chimuk | Stuart Gresham | Jeff Tarko | Winnipeg, Manitoba+ |
| Tobias Lundmark | Eric Brasier | Anton Södergren | Oscar Bjornham | | Umeå, Sweden |
| Jack Lyburn | Ethan Marshall | Rylan Campbell | Brogan Schneider | | Brandon, Manitoba |
| William Lyburn | Daley Peters | Kennedy Bird | Wade Ford | Bryce McEwen | Winnipeg, Manitoba |
| Ma Xiuyue | Zou Qiang | Wang Zhiyu | Xu Jingtao | Jiang Dongxu | Beijing, China |
| Mathias Mabergs | Håkan Eklund | Malte Edlund | Henrik Edlund | | Stockholm, Sweden |
| Adam MacDonald | Trevor Hanson | Daniel Lister | Chris Cogswell | | Oromocto, New Brunswick |
| Brent MacDougall | Tommy Sullivan | Martin Gavin | Kirk MacDiarmid | | Halifax, Nova Scotia |
| Sandy MacEwan | Dustin Montpellier | Lee Toner | Luc Ouimet | | Sudbury, Ontario |
| Peter Mackey | Mark Pillsworth | Jeff Nadeau | Greg Howard | Peter Van Strien | Iqaluit, Nunavut |
| Mason MacNeil | Kaleb Picek | John Voudrach | Kolsen Church | | Inuvik, Northwest Territories |
| Takumi Maeda | Uryu Kamikawa | Hiroki Maeda | Asei Nakahara | | Kitami, Japan |
| Daniel Magnusson | Rasmus Israelsson | Robin Ahlberg | Anton Regosa | | Karlstad, Sweden |
| Rob Maksymetz | Dean Darwent | Stephen Bryne | Phil Hemming | | Grande Prairie, Alberta |
| Scott Manners | Ryan Miller | Josh Boettcher | Carter Babij | | Lloydminster, Saskatchewan |
| Elliott Mansell | Aaron Johnston | Simon Jarrett | Cameron Cabrera | | (United States) Denver, Colorado |
| Matthew Manuel | Luke Saunders | Jeffrey Meagher | Nick Zachernuk | | Halifax, Nova Scotia |
| Mikael Ljungberg (Fourth) | Fredrik Ljungberg | Emil Markusson (Skip) | Jonatan Markusson | | Östersund, Sweden |
| Kelly Marnoch | Bart Witherspoon | Branden Jorgensen | Dean Smith | Justin Reischek | Carberry, Manitoba |
| Yannick Martel | Jean-François Charest | Philippe Brassard | René Dubois | | Saguenay, Quebec |
| Bert Martin | Chris McDonah | Kyle Morrison | Dan Bubola | | Calgary, Alberta |
| Evan Martin | Travis Bale | Ian Fordyce | Nigel Milnes | Jon Ray | Winnipeg, Manitoba |
| Yuta Matsumura | Tetsuro Shimizu | Yasumasa Tanida | Shinya Abe | Kosuke Aita | Kitami, Japan |
| Lukas Matt | Harald Sprenger | Johannes Zimmermann | Peter Prasch | Juergen Gstoehl | Liechtenstein |
| Pascal Matti | Janosch Berger | Kenjo Von Allmen | Yanick Haenni | | Gstaad, Switzerland |
| Ken McArdle | Randie Shen | Neil Houston | Tony Zidar | | New Westminster, British Columbia |
| Kyle McCannell | Rhilynd Peters | Thomas Titchkosky | Jeff MacMillan | Curtis McCannell | Winnipeg, Manitoba |
| Matthew McCrady | Alex Horvath | Breyden Carpenter | Logan Miron | | New Westminster, British Columbia |
| Jordon McDonald | Reece Hamm | Elias Huminicki | Alexandre Fontaine | | Winnipeg, Manitoba |
| Mike McEwen | Reid Carruthers | Derek Samagalski | Colin Hodgson | | West St. Paul, Manitoba |
| Thomas McGillivray | Aaron Macdonell | John Trinke | Brennan Kezema | Trevor Heide | Winnipeg, Manitoba |
| Jordan McNamara | Maxime Daigle | John McCutcheon | Brendan Laframboise | | Ottawa, Ontario |
| Ryan McNeil Lamswood | Daniel Bruce | Nathan King | Aaron Feltham | | St. John's, Newfoundland and Labrador |
| Shaun Meachem | Brady Scharback | Brayden Stewart | Jared Latos | | Swift Current, Saskatchewan |
| Terry Meek | Ralph Brust | Greg Northcott | Peter Innes | | Calgary, Alberta |
| Sonny Melancon | Alexandre Michaud | Vincent Raymond | Kurtis Hanna | | La Sarre, Quebec |
| Michael Mellemseter | Eirik Mjøen | Willhelm Næss | Harald Skarsheim Rian | | Oslo, Norway |
| Marcelo Mello | Ricardo Losso | Gilad Kempenich | Filipe Nunes | | São Paulo, Brazil |
| Jean-Michel Ménard | Philippe Ménard | Dany Deschamps | Daniel Elie | | Gatineau, Quebec |
| Eddy Mercier | Quentin Morard | Leo Tuaz-Torchon | Killian Gaudin | | Lyon, France |
| Pascal Michaud | Andrew Bugg | Decebal Michaud | Joey Medaglia | | Ottawa, Ontario |
| Jaedon Miller | Riley Lloyd | Jared Day | Trey Chernoff | | Regina, Saskatchewan |
| Cody Mitchell | Kurt Dixon | Mark Carefoot | Darwin Seidler | | Swift Current, Saskatchewan |
| Scott Mitchell | Landan Rooney | Nathan Steele | Jacob Jones | Colin Schnurr | Whitby, Ontario |
| Markus Dale (Fourth) | Emil Sæther | Anders Mjøen (Skip) | Erland Loe | Jonathan Got | Oppdal, Norway |
| Paul Moffatt | Ben Shane | John Gabel | Kyle Forster | Scott McDonald | Kitchener, Ontario |
| Raphael Moix | Vincent Huguelet | Jean-Daniel Rouveyrol | Nathan Dussez | | Morges, Switzerland |
| Nathan Molberg | Aaron Power | Benjamin Helston | Morgan Bilassy | | St. Albert, Alberta |
| Jason Montgomery | Chris Baier | Miles Craig | William Duggan | | Victoria, British Columbia |
| Sam Mooibroek | Matthew Garner | Brady Lumley | Spencer Dunlop | | Kitchener, Ontario |
| Alain Moreau | Jean-Christophe Pichon | Guylain Fiset | Eric Villeneuve | | Val-d'Or, Quebec |
| Konstantin Manasevich (Fourth) | Sergey Morozov (Skip) | Vadim Shvedov | Alexander Orlov | | Saint Petersburg, Russia |
| Yusuke Morozumi | Masaki Iwai | Ryotaro Shukuya | Kosuke Morozumi | | Karuizawa, Japan |
| David Morton | Dimitri Jean-Paul | Ryan McGuire | – | | Ottawa, Ontario |
| Nick Mosher | Sean Beland | Evan Hennigar | Aidan MacDonald | Owen McPherson | Halifax, Nova Scotia |
| Jack Moss | Ryan Duckworth | John Moss | Riley Fairbanks | | Calgary, Alberta |
| Bruce Mouat | Grant Hardie | Bobby Lammie | Hammy McMillan Jr. | | Stirling, Scotland |
| Richard Muntain | Paul Scinocca | Ed Barr | Joel Newbury | Joel Marcon | Winnipeg, Manitoba |
| Taikan Mutoh | Noritoki Koana | Ryouta Iwasaki | Tomohiro Kimura | Masayuki Hosoda | Yamanashi, Japan |
| Toa Nakahara | Hinata Michitani | Riku Takemura | Yuuta Kimura | Yuki Sawamukai | Japan |
| Yuuji Nakata | Fumaki Kawamura | Yuuma Tanabe | Toshinori Sasaki | | Japan |
| Magnus Nedregotten | Mathias Brænden | Alexander Lindström | Nicolai Sommervold | | Lillehammer, Norway |
| Nayton Neill | Elijah DeRomanis | Benjamin Skoog | Joseph Calabrese | Stephen Colandrea | (United States) Rochester, New York |
| Peter Nero | Marcus Johansson | Johan Andersson | Lars Landelius | | Mjölby, Sweden |
| Anthony Neufeld | Nicklas Neufeld | Domenic Neufeld | James Neufeld | Dale Neufeld | Saskatoon, Saskatchewan |
| Randy Neufeld | Dean Moxham | Peter Nicholls | Dale Fust | Dean Clayton | La Salle, Manitoba |
| Dylan Niepage | Gavin Lydiate | Jayden King | Daniel Del Conte | | Guelph, Ontario |
| Rob Nobert | Kelly McQuiggan | Adam Cseke | Cam Weir | | Vernon, British Columbia |
| Jørn Nordhagen | Thomas Myrhaug | Erik Brænden | Tom Ian Halsor | Jan Sveen | Lillehammer, Norway |
| Ryan Norman | Kevin Albrecht | Everett Samuelson | Steve Gladue | | Grande Prairie, Alberta |
| Dean North | Kyle MacNair | Wayne Nussey | Mike Hutton | Darcy Hayward | Carman, Manitoba |
| Mark Noseworthy | Steve Bragg | Randy Turpin | Steve Routledge | | St. John's, Newfoundland and Labrador |
| Josh Nowlan | Alex Peasley | Wil Robertson | Jacob Nowlan | | Moncton, New Brunswick |
| Håkan Nyberg | Hans Stenström | Richard Eriksson | Ulf Johansson | | Linköping, Sweden |
| Mats Nyberg | Björn Rosendahl | Per Södergren | Hans Söderström | | Danderyd, Sweden |
| Johan Nygren | Victor Martinsson | Daniel Berggren | Johan Jaervenson | Sebastian Lundgren | Umeå, Sweden |
| Fredrik Nyman | Albin Eriksson | Simon Olofsson | Johannes Patz | | Sollefteå, Sweden |
| Alan O'Leary | Stuart MacLean | Danny Christianson | Harold McCarthy | | Dartmouth, Nova Scotia |
| Sean O'Leary | Andrew Trickett | Dylan Hancock | Jake Young | | St. John's, Newfoundland and Labrador |
| Eirik Øy | Johan Herfjord | Sondre Elvevold | Martin Bruseth | | Oslo, Norway |
| Ryo Ogihara | Satoru Tsukamoto | Nobuhito Kasahara | Kishiro Kyo | Osuke Miya | Tokyo, Japan |
| Oh Gyu-nam | Kang Min-jun | Park Yeong-ho | Park Jeong-hwan | Song Ye-sung | Seoul, South Korea |
| Cameron Olafson | Riel Dufault | Jonathan Kostna | Seth Boschmann | | East St. Paul, Manitoba |
| Aidan Oldenburg | Nick Soto | Jake Thurston | Connor Kauffman | Jacob Zeman | (United States) Saint Paul, Minnesota |
| Eren Oleson | Sean Davidson | Keaton Bachalo | Brady Moxham | Brett Moxham | Portage la Prairie, Manitoba |
| Grant Olsen | Andrew Nerpin | Trevor Miyahara | Cary Blue | | Kamloops, British Columbia |
| Tye Olson | Allan Walter | Tyler Corbin | – | | Estevan, Saskatchewan |
| Sven Olsson | Anders Haglund | Niclas Svenman | Johan Ceder | Thomas Norgren | Falun, Sweden |
| Koto Onodera | Tomoya Watanabe | Daiki Shikano | Ryo Itsubo | Takanobu Yamaura | Tokyo, Japan |
| James Owens | Hunter Labbie | Carter Parenteau | Josh Yuzik | | Saskatoon, Saskatchewan |
| Camil Palin | Simon Jeanson | Serge Palin | Pierre-Luc Jeanson | | Val-d'Or, Quebec |
| Ryan Parent | Zachary Pawliuk | Jared Jenkins | John Ritchie | | Edmonton, Alberta |
| Park Hyeon-su | Li Seon-kyu | Kim Jin-woong | Jeong Da-yeol | | Gangwon-do, South Korea |
| Park Jong-duk | Jeong Yeong-seok | Oh Seung-hoon | Lee Ki-bok | | Gyeonggi-do, South Korea |
| Ross Paterson (Fourth) | Kyle Waddell (Skip) | Duncan Menzies | Craig Waddell | | Glasgow, Scotland |
| Mark Patterson | Rick Law | Aiden Poole | Andrew Willemsma | | Blenheim, Ontario |
| Ken Peddigrew | David Noftall | Andrew Manuel | Craig Dowden | | St. John's, Newfoundland and Labrador |
| Todd Pellerin | Steve Bruder | David Parker | Brett Johnston | | Trail, British Columbia |
| Simon Perry | Nicholas Codner | William Butler | Evan Scott | | St. John's, Newfoundland and Labrador |
| Greg Persinger | Dominik Märki | Alex Leichter | Craig Brown | | (United States) Fairbanks, Alaska |
| Mikael Peterson | Sebastián Aguilera | Patrick Helgstedt | Anton Friberg | | Jönköping, Sweden |
| Damian Pilie | Samuelle Masse | Jasmin Lapalme | Sylvain Mainville | | Montreal, Quebec |
| Pavol Pitoňák | František Pitoňák | Tomáš Pitoňák | Peter Pitoňák | | Slovakia |
| Tony Pölder | Claes Mattsson | Johan Hornberg | – | | Jönköping, Sweden |
| Nathan Pomedli | Braden Fleishhacker | Jayden Bindig | Ethan Nygaard | Ethan Desilets | Saskatoon, Saskatchewan |
| Graham Powell | Kelsey Dusseault | Jeremy Hodges | Troy Given | | Grande Prairie, Alberta |
| Gert Precenth | Olle Nåbo | Göran Valfridsson | Per Persson | | Mjölby, Sweden |
| Peter Newton (Fourth) | Tim Church | Tom Pruliere (Skip) | Tanner Nathan | | Sarnia, Ontario |
| Owen Purcell | Joel Krats | Adam McEachren | Scott Weagle | | Upper Tantallon, Nova Scotia |
| Liam Quinlan | Caleb Tibbs | Luke Wilson | Jack Furlong | Steve Tibbs | St. John's, Newfoundland and Labrador |
| Howard Rajala | Rich Moffatt | Chris Fulton | Paul Madden | | Ottawa, Ontario |
| P. N. Raju | Giri Suthakaran | Vinay Goenka | Kishan Vasant | Shubham Sharma | Hyderabad, India |
| Magnus Ramsfjell | Martin Sesaker | Bendik Ramsfjell | Gaute Nepstad | | Trondheim, Norway |
| Ansis Regža | Jānis Rudzītis | Aivars Purmalis | Ainārs Gulbis | | Riga, Latvia |
| Fraser Reid | Shane Konings | Spencer Nuttall | Tyler Twinning | | Waterloo, Ontario |
| Joël Retornaz | Amos Mosaner | Sebastiano Arman | Simone Gonin | | Pinerolo, Italy |
| Fabio Ribotta | Fabrizio Gallo | Giovanni Tosel | Davide Forchino | | Trentino, Italy |
| Jeff Richard | Brent Pierce | Jared Kolomaya | Nicholas Meister | | Kelowna, British Columbia |
| Martin Rios | Christof Schwaller | Kevin Spychiger | Peju Hartmann | | Glarus, Switzerland |
| Mattia Giovanella (Fourth) | Alberto Pimpini | Daniele Ferrazza | Luca Rizzolli (Skip) | | Trentino, Italy |
| François Roberge | Serge Reid | Daniel Bédard | Maxime Elmaleh | | Saint-Romuald, Quebec |
| Vincent Roberge | Jean-Michel Arsenault | Jesse Mullen | Julien Tremblay | | Saint-Romuald, Quebec |
| Alex Robichaud | Chris Wagner | Alex Kyle | – | | Fredericton, New Brunswick |
| Sébastien Robillard | Bowie Abbis-Mills | Cody Tanaka | Nathan Small | | New Westminster, British Columbia |
| Roland Robinson | Dean Darwent | Steve Byrne | Phil Hemming | | Edmonton, Alberta |
| Adam Rocheleau | Maxime Mailloux | Emry Blanchard | Jonathan Martel | | Noranda, Quebec |
| Axel Rosander | Vincent Stenberg | Kristofer Blom | Niclas Johansson | | Norrköping, Sweden |
| Brent Ross | Ryan Werenich | Joey Rettinger | Shawn Kaufman | | Harriston, Ontario |
| Johan Sundberg (Fourth) | Michael Roxin (Skip) | Stefan Englund | Niclas Silfverduk | | Linköping, Sweden |
| Jean-Sébastien Roy | Don Bowser | Jasmin Gibeau | Dan deWaard | | Chelsea, Quebec |
| Justin Runciman | Gryffen Algot | Steven Leong | Carter Elder | | Sherwood Park, Alberta |
| Rich Ruohonen | Andrew Stopera | Colin Hufman | Kroy Nernberger | Phil Tilker | (United States) Minneapolis, Minnesota |
| JT Ryan | Colin Kurz | Joey Hart | Brendan Bilawka | | Winnipeg, Manitoba |
| Konstantin Rykov | Arunas Skrolis | Paulius Kamarauskas | Donatas Kiudys | | Vilnius, Lithuania |
| Go Aoki (Fourth) | Hayato Sato (Skip) | Kei Kamada | Kazushi Nino | Ayato Sasaki | Sapporo, Japan |
| Gerry Savoie | Andre Bellavance | Jean Carrier | Michel Tetrault | | Val-d'Or, Quebec |
| Andrin Schnider | Nicola Stoll | Felix Eberhard | Fabian Schmid | | Schaffhausen, Switzerland |
| Jannis Bannwart (Fourth) | Kim Schwaller (Skip) | Andreas Gerlach | Baptiste Défago | Fabio Da Ros | St. Gallen, Switzerland |
| Yannick Schwaller | Michael Brunner | Romano Meier | Marcel Käufeler | | Bern, Switzerland |
| Štefan Sever | Simon Langus | Bine Sever | Jakob Omerzel | Gaber Bor Zelinka | Ljubljana, Slovenia |
| John Shuster | Chris Plys | Matt Hamilton | John Landsteiner | | (United States) Chaska, Minnesota |
| Mike Siggins | Adam Endicott | Travis Gaddie | Eric Kowal | | (United States) Phoenix, Arizona |
| Stefan Signer | Juerg Denecke | Gerhard Kurt | Pierre Kruettli | | Bern, Switzerland |
| Steen Sigurdson | Justin Reynolds | Justin Hoplock | Dan LeBlanc | | Winnipeg, Manitoba |
| David Šik | Jakub Hanák | Jakub Rychlý | Matěj Koudelka | | Prague, Czech Republic |
| Guy Simard | Mario Dion | Sylvain Allard | Alain Bédard | | Amos, Quebec |
| Pat Simmons | Colton Lott | Kyle Doering | Tanner Lott | Emerson Klimpke | Winnipeg, Manitoba |
| Trent Skanes | Cory Schuh | Adam Boland | Spencer Wicks | | St. John's, Newfoundland and Labrador |
| Aaron Sluchinski | Kerr Drummond | Dylan Webster | – | | Red Deer, Alberta |
| Jack Smeltzer | Michael Donovan | Trevor Crouse | Mitchell Small | | Fredericton, New Brunswick |
| Alex Smith | Stephen Trickett | Zach Young | Mike Mosher | | St. John's, Newfoundland and Labrador |
| Greg Smith | Greg Blyde | Carter Small | Alex McDonah | | St. John's, Newfoundland and Labrador |
| Riley Smith | Nick Curtis | Jared Hancox | Justin Twiss | Josh Claeys | Winnipeg, Manitoba |
| Tucker Smith | Austin Weber | Chad Riedel | Adam Craghead | | (United States) Sioux Falls, South Dakota |
| Tyler Smith | Adam Cocks | Ed White | Ryan Lowery | | Charlottetown, Prince Edward Island |
| Darryl Sobering | Sean Stevinson | Sean Franey | Josh Chetwynd | | (United States) Denver, Colorado |
| Cortland Sonnenberg | Owen Fenske | Jaxon Hiebert | Adam Eisenheimer | | Grande Prairie, Alberta |
| Jared St. John | Ken Dixon | Tyler Jaeger | Graham Lyle | | Penticton, British Columbia |
| Jesse St. John | Carl deConinck Smith | Chris Haichert | Kurt Dixon | | Swift Current, Saskatchewan |
| Rune Steen Hansen | Tor Egil Stroemeng | Anders Fonn-Brenden | Gjermund Troan | Peder Siksjo | Hedmarken, Norway |
| Sam Steep | Adam Vincent | Oliver Campbell | Thomas Ryan | Doug Thomson | Seaforth, Ontario |
| Bill Adams (Fourth) | Jeff Henderson | Mike Grinnell | John Stetski (Skip) | | Ottawa, Ontario |
| Chad Stevens | Peter Burgess | Graham Breckon | Kelly Mittelstadt | | Truro, Nova Scotia |
| Jan Hess (Fourth) | Yves Stocker (Skip) | Simon Gloor | Reto Schönenberger | | Zug, Switzerland |
| Kyle Stratton | Liam Tardif | Matthew Pouget | Brayden Appleby | | London, Ontario |
| Jack Strawhorn | Hamish Gallacher | Kaleb Johnston | Struan Carson | | Stirling, Scotland |
| Karsten Sturmay | Tristan Steinke | Chris Kennedy | Glenn Venance | | Edmonton, Alberta |
| Konrad Stych | Krzysztof Domin | Marcin Cieminski | Bartosz Lobaza | | Łódź, Poland |
| Cody Sutherland | Brecklin Gervais | Dalton Wasden | Carter Williamson | | North Battleford, Saskatchewan |
| Kim Svedelid | Måns Winge | Paul Westerberg | Carl-Oscar Pihl | | Sundbyberg, Sweden |
| Andrew Symonds | Colin Thomas | Chris Ford | Keith Jewer | | St. John's, Newfoundland and Labrador |
| Johnson Tao | Jaedon Neuert | Benjamin Morin | Andrew Nowell | | Edmonton, Alberta |
| Tyler Tardi | Sterling Middleton | Jason Ginter | Jordan Tardi | | Langley, British Columbia |
| Stuart Thompson | Kendal Thompson | Colton Steele | Michael Brophy | | Halifax, Nova Scotia |
| Brandon Tippin | Chad Allen | Dylan Tippin | Jess Bechard | | Owen Sound, Ontario |
| Parker Tipple | Spencer Tipple | Jack Kinsella | Isaac Manuel | | St. John's, Newfoundland and Labrador |
| Sixten Totzek | Marc Muskatewitz | Joshua Sutor | Dominik Greindl | | Munich, Germany |
| Anthony Petoud (Fourth) | Noé Traub (Skip) | Pablo Lachat | Theo Kurz | | Lausanne, Switzerland |
| Mārtiņš Trukšāns | Jānis Klīve | Arnis Veidemanis | Sandris Buholcs | | Riga, Latvia |
| Sota Tsuruga | Haruto Ouchi | Takuto Ouchi | Naoki Kanazawa | Daishi Ikezaki | Sapporo, Japan |
| Kevin Tuma | Samuel Clasen | Sidney Harris | Stuart Strack | | (United States) Saint Paul, Minnesota |
| Evan van Amsterdam | Cole Adams | Tyler van Amsterdam | Tyson Toews | | Calgary, Alberta |
| Wouter Gösgens (Fourth) | Jaap van Dorp (Skip) | Laurens Hoekman | Carlo Glasbergen | | Zoetermeer, Netherlands |
| Daylan Vavrek | Carter Lautner | Tyler Lautner | Evan Asmussen | | Calgary, Alberta |
| Jaroslav Vedral | Lukáš Klípa | Martin Blahovec | Daniel Peter | | Prague, Czech Republic |
| Darrel Veiner | Ken Powell | Marc Boisvert | – | | Grande Prairie, Alberta |
| Mihhail Vlassov (Fourth) | Eduard Veltsman (Skip) | Janis Kiziridi | Igor Dzendzeljuk | | Tallinn, Estonia |
| Mykyta Velychko | Eduard Nikolov | Yaroslav Shchur | Artem Suhak | | Ukraine |
| Tom van Waterschoot (Fourth) | Jeroen Spruyt | Timo Verreycken (Skip) | Bram van Looy | Daan Yskout | Belgium |
| Sergio Vez | Mikel Unanue | Eduardo De Paz | Nicholas Shaw | | Vitoria-Gasteiz, Spain |
| Luc Violette | Chase Sinnett | Ben Richardson | Jon Harstad | | (United States) Chaska, Minnesota |
| Shane Vollman | Kevin Fetsch | Garry Janz | Bob Sonder | | Regina, Saskatchewan |
| Krišs Vonda | Jānis Vonda | Roberts Buncis | Didzis Pētersons | Ričards Vonda | Riga, Latvia |
| Steffen Walstad | Torger Nergård | Markus Høiberg | Magnus Vågberg | | Oslo, Norway |
| Zachary Wasylik | Jack Hykaway | Joshua Harding | Graham Normand | Ghislain Courcelles | Winnipeg, Manitoba |
| Stephan Watson | Jeffrey Stewart | Ian South | Lewis South | | Montreal, Quebec |
| Mark Watt | Gregor Cannon | Blair Haswell | Gavin Barr | | Stirling, Scotland |
| Scott Webb | Tracy Steinke | Jordan Steinke | Stefan Pavlis | | (Alberta) Grande Prairie, Manitoba |
| Wesley Wendling | John Wilkerson | Charlie Thompson | Christopher Kirsch | Austin Carlson | (United States) Wausau, Wisconsin |
| Anders Westerberg | Lars Ahlberg | Mikael Guslin | – | | Sundbyberg, Sweden |
| Wade White | Barry Chwedoruk | Dan Holowaychuk | George White | | Edmonton, Alberta |
| Ross Whyte | Robin Brydone | Duncan McFadzean | Euan Kyle | | Stirling, Scotland |
| Christer Wibe | Andreas Lund | Thomas Moe | Joacim Suther | | Halden, Norway |
| Ryan Wiebe | Sean Flatt | Zack Bilawka | Adam Flatt | | Winnipeg, Manitoba |
| Matt Wilerton | Craig MacAlpine | Jeremy Hodges | Chris Evernden | | Edmonton, Alberta |
| Sam Wills | Grady LaMontagne | Blake Hoffman | Brody Blackwell | | Regina, Saskatchewan |
| John Willsey | Connor Lawes | Robert Currie | Evan Lilly | | Collingwood, Ontario |
| John Wilson | Kyle Paradis | Arran Cameron | Craig Whyte | | Ireland |
| Kenan Wipf | Zac Duncan | Michael Keenan | Max Cinnamon | | Calgary, Alberta |
| Zackary Wise | Michael Solomon | Robert Derry | Tyler Lachance | | Montreal, Quebec |
| Dustin Woloschuk | Matt Gesell | Lyndon Graff | Spencer Ellis | Jordan Gottinger | Regina, Saskatchewan |
| Billy Woods | Don Chasse | Guy Cloutier | Nick Chasse | | Dow's Lake, Ontario |
| Harold Woods III | Tijani Cole | Chris Neimeth | Robert Payne | | Accra, Nigeria |
| Brent Yamada | Glen Archer | Randy Nelson | Owen Hayward | | Kamloops, British Columbia |
| Tsuyoshi Yamaguchi | Riku Yanagisawa | Satoshi Koizumi | Takeru Yamamoto | | Karuizawa, Japan |
| Yang Woo-jin | Kim Min-sang | Jeong Hyun-wook | Park Seo-yun | Kim Hong-geon | Uijeongbu, South Korea |
| Nathan Young | Sam Follett | Nathan Locke | Ben Stringer | | St. John's, Newfoundland and Labrador |
| Zou Qiang | Tian Jiafeng | Wang Zhiyu | Xu Jingtao | Han Peng | Beijing, China |
| Rob Zuravloff | Brandon Zuravloff | Garret Fedak | Jonathan Nagy | Reese Kinaschuk | Canora, Saskatchewan |

== Women ==
As of May 15, 2022

| Skip | Third | Second | Lead | Alternate | Locale |
|---|---|---|---|---|---|
| Saki Adachi | Kyoko Nozawa | Honoka Sato | Miri Hashimoto | Katsuko Suzuki | Japan |
| Miia Ahrenberg | Minna Karvinen | Susanna Säntti | Jenni Bäckman | Tiina Suuripää | Hyvinkää, Finland |
| Azuki Akimoto | Natsuko Ishiyama | Miho Honnma | Chika Kudou | Noa Kyoutou | Sapporo, Japan |
| Bethany Allen | Samantha Eagles | Emily Ostrowsky | Taylor Letham | Madison Lyburn | Winnipeg, Manitoba |
| Carla Anaka | Nancy Inglis | Stephanie Bukurak | Brandi Clarke | | Regina, Saskatchewan |
| Sherry Anderson | Nancy Martin | Chaelynn Kitz | Breanne Knapp | | Saskatoon, Saskatchewan |
| Sherry Anderson | Patty Hersikorn | Brenda Goertzen | Anita Silvernagle | | Saskatoon, Saskatchewan |
| Olga Antonova | Maria Drozdova | Veronika Serebrova | Arina Savchenko | Polina Gushcha | Saint Petersburg, Russia |
| Pam Appelman | Holly Baird | Candace Read | Trina Ball | | Edmonton, Alberta |
| Lorraine Arguin | Donda-Lee Deis | Tamara Quintin | Tanis Swallow | | Moose Jaw, Saskatchewan |
| Mary-Anne Arsenault | Jeanna Schraeder | Sasha Carter | Renee Simons | | Kelowna, British Columbia |
| Hannah Augustin | Marijke Reitsma | Sara Haidinger | Johanna Höß | Teresa Treichl | Kitzbühel, Austria |
| Cathy Auld | Chrissy Cadorin | Leslie Bishop | Cayla Auld | | Thornhill, Ontario |
| Courtney Auld | Cayla Auld | Audrey Wallbank | Celeste Gauthier | Jessica Filipcic | Toronto, Ontario |
| Anastasia Babarykina | Victoria Shtreker | Anastasia Belikova | Anna Lukianchikova | Vaeria Miroshnichenko | Saint Petersburg, Russia |
| Kelly Backman | Stephanie Guzzwell | Liz Woodworth | Julia Colter | Kristen MacDiarmid | Halifax, Nova Scotia |
| Ryleigh Bakker | Madison Johnson | Kaitlyn Zeiler | Cameron Kuzma | Sydney Libbus | Calgary, Alberta |
| Ban Hee-eun | Jeong Yung-yeong | Kang Su-ji | Shin Su-ah | Kwak Ji-hye | Seoul, South Korea |
| Brett Barber | Alyssa Kostyk | Krystal Englot | Mackenzie Schwartz | | Biggar, Saskatchewan |
| Kylee Barden | Aubrey Rietmann | Lauren Hein | Oil Lee | | (United States) Arlington, Wisconsin |
| Penny Barker | Christie Gamble | Jenna Enge | Danielle Sicinski | | Moose Jaw, Saskatchewan |
| Evelīna Barone | Rēzija Ieviņa | Veronika Apse | Ērika Patrīcija Bitmete | Letīcija Ieviņa | Riga, Latvia |
| Madison Bear | Annmarie Dubberstein | Taylor Drees | Allison Howell | | (United States) Chaska, Minnesota |
| Grace Beaudry | Arianne Courcelles | Jensen Letham | Chelsea Swalie | Lauren Beaudry | Winnipeg, Manitoba |
| Emma Beaulac | Bryn Woloshyn | Claire Bevan-Stewart | Darby-Anne Swanson | | Edmonton, Alberta |
| Adrienne Belliveau | Alyssa Blad | Madison Fisher | Shannon Warriner | | Dundas, Ontario |
| Damaris Berg | Tessa Wagner | Gracia Berg | Elaina Hoover | | (United States) Bemidji, Minnesota |
| Cheryl Bernard | Carolyn McRorie | Laine Peters | Karen Ruus | | Calgary, Alberta |
| Veronica Bernard | Cassie Bernard | Lindsey Schmalz | Jessica Schmalz | Caitlyn Evely | Elmira, Ontario |
| Lindsay Bertsch | Nicole Larson | Valerie Ekelund | Hope Sunley | | Calgary, Alberta |
| Shae Bevan | Kyla Grabowski | Paige Beaudry | Jessica Hancox | Grace Beaudry | Winnipeg, Manitoba |
| Hailey Birnie | Patty Wallingham | Kerry Campbell | Kimberly Tuor | Stephanie Brown | Whitehorse, Yukon |
| Suzanne Birt | Marie Christianson | Meaghan Hughes | Michelle McQuaid | | Charlottetown, Prince Edward Island |
| Christina Black | Jenn Baxter | Karlee Everist | Shelley Barker | | Halifax, Nova Scotia |
| Sophie Blades | Kate Weissent | Stephanie Atherton | Alexis Cluney | | Chester, Nova Scotia |
| Lucy Blair | Alexandra MacKintosh | Anna Warden | Katie Grant | | Greenacres, Howwood, Scotland |
| Jade Bloor | Renee Michaud | Ashley Green | Chelsey Kennedy | | Regina, Saskatchewan |
| Evelīna Barone (Fourth) | Santa Blumberga-Bērziņa (Skip) | Ieva Rudzīte | Ieva Krusta | Tīna Siliņa | Riga, Latvia |
| Claire Booth | Kaylee Raniseth | Raelyn Helston | Kate Ector | | Calgary, Alberta |
| Cathy Borys | Connie Lunde | Pauline Erickson | Lynn Penner | Charlene Jack | Edmonton, Alberta |
| Natalie Boucher | Kathy Kerr | Carole Fujimoto | Susan Goheen | | Ottawa, Ontario |
| Emily Bowles | Meredith Cole | Keira McCoy | Chelsea Taylor | | New Westminster, British Columbia |
| Paige Bown | Dominique Vivier | Kailee Delaney | Emma Rebel | | Ottawa, Ontario |
| Shelly Bradley | Amanda Power | Aleya Quilty | Jodi Murphy | | Charlottetown, Prince Edward Island |
| Chelsea Brandwood | Brenda Holloway | Riley Sandham | Hilary Nuhn | Jordan Brandwood | St. Catharines, Ontario |
| Theresa Breen | Mary Sue Radford | Julie McMullin | Helen Radford | | Halifax, Nova Scotia |
| Gabby Brissette | Naomi Britz | Kate Eisner | Erin Fitzgibbon | | Chilliwack, British Columbia |
| Jill Brothers | Erin Carmody | Sarah Murphy | Jenn Mitchell | Kim Kelly | Halifax, Nova Scotia |
| Corryn Brown | Erin Pincott | Dezaray Hawes | Samantha Fisher | | Kamloops, British Columbia |
| Kaila Buchy | Jaelyn Cotter | Katelyn McGillivray | Hannah Lindner | | Kimberley, British Columbia |
| Linara Burganova | Elena Ustinova | Elizaveta Petrova | Darina Gultiaeva | Victoria Zakharova | Saint Petersburg, Russia |
| Alyssa Calvert | Stacey Fordyce | Pam Robins | – | | Brandon, Manitoba |
| Jenni Cannon | Leeanne McKenzie | Kirsty Barr | Annabel Skuse | Layla Al-Saffar | Stranraer, Scotland |
| Chelsea Carey | Jolene Campbell | Stephanie Schmidt | Jennifer Armstrong | Rachel Erickson | Regina, Saskatchewan |
| Lauren Cheal | Alexia Perron | Jessie Sutherland | Leah Andrews | | Lennoxville, Quebec |
| Daria Chmarra | Aneta Lipińska | Marta Leszczyńska | Magdalena Kołodziej | | Łódź, Poland |
| Cory Christensen | Sarah Anderson | Vicky Persinger | Taylor Anderson | | (United States) Chaska, Minnesota |
| Jennifer Clark-Rouire | Lisa McLeod | Kelsey Meger | Laurie Macdonnell | Jolene Callum | Winnipeg, Manitoba |
| Erica Cluff | Ashley Cormier | Rachel Brewer | Meghan Beland | | Fredericton, New Brunswick |
| Kelly Cochrane | Jodi McCutcheon | Jane Almey | Lisa Rawlings | | Toronto, Ontario |
| Kaelen Coles-Lyster | Sydney Phillips | Sarah Wong | Amanda Wong | | Marpole, British Columbia |
| Sandy Comeau | Shelley Thomas | Judy Blanchard | Carol Justason | | Moncton, New Brunswick |
| Stefania Constantini | Marta Lo Deserto | Angela Romei | Giulia Zardini Lacedelli | Elena Dami | Trentino, Italy |
| Shiella Cowan | Sandra Comadina | Stephanie Whittaker-Kask | Kim Slattery | Julie Bellerive | Vancouver, British Columbia |
| Andrea Crawford | Sylvie Quillian | Jillian Babin | Katie Forward | Justine Comeau | Fredericton, New Brunswick |
| Bella Croisier | Julia Bakos | Emilie Lovitt | Piper Croisier | | Sudbury, Ontario |
| Elysa Crough | Quinn Prodaniuk | Kim Bonneau | Julianna Mackenzie | | Edmonton, Alberta |
| Jennifer Crouse | Kate Callaghan | Sheena Moore | Kaitlin Fralic | Marin Callaghan | Halifax, Nova Scotia |
| Erica Curtis | Mackenzie Glynn | Julie Hynes | Camille Burt | | St. John's, Newfoundland and Labrador |
| Jessica Daigle | Kristin Clarke | Lindsey Burgess | Emma Logan | Colleen Jones | Halifax, Nova Scotia |
| Calissa Daly | Breanna Rozon | Michaela Robert | Alice Holyoke | | Guelph, Ontario |
| Janais DeJong | Stephanie Malekoff | Amy Findlay | Delia DeJong | | Grande Prairie, Alberta |
| Abby Deschene | Britney Malette | Mya Smith | Zoe Valliere | | Sudbury, Ontario |
| Emily Deschenes | Emma Artichuk | Grace Lloyd | Evelyn Robert | | Greely, Ontario |
| Morgan Deschiffart | Emma Deschiffart | Macey McPherson | Madison Milot | | Lacombe, Alberta |
| Parker Doig | Alyson Duguid | Meaghan Mallett | Sarah Kay | | Seaforth, Ontario |
| Hollie Duncan | Megan Balsdon | Rachelle Strybosch | Tess Bobbie | Julie Tippin | Woodstock, Ontario |
| Wendy Dunne | Jennifer Taylor | Andrea Heffernan | Noelle Thomas-Kennell | | St. John's, Newfoundland and Labrador |
| Madeleine Dupont | Mathilde Halse | Denise Dupont | My Larsen | Lina Knudsen | Hvidovre, Denmark |
| Angelina Ebauyer | Sitora Alliyarova | Tilsimay Alliyarova | Regina Ebauyer | Ayazhan Zhumabek | Almaty, Kazakhstan |
| Cheyenne Ehnes | Dayna Lea | Madelyn Pryzlak | Talia Bertrand-Meadows | | Winnipeg, Manitoba |
| Kerri Einarson | Val Sweeting | Shannon Birchard | Briane Meilleur | | Gimli, Manitoba |
| Isabell Einspieler | Alissa Rudolf | Lynn Haupt | Jana Hoffmann | | St. Gallen, Switzerland |
| Anastasia Eksuzian | Arina Piantina | Nadezda Beliakova | Alexandra Antonova | Alisa Shenefeldt | Saint Petersburg, Russia |
| Krista Ellingson | Charity McLeod | Ellen Redlick | Brett Day | | Saskatoon, Saskatchewan |
| Viktoria Enbaeva | Diana Margarian | Alina Borodulina | Anastasia Kilchevskaya | Alina Severianova | Saint Petersburg, Russia |
| Michelle Englot | Sara England | Shelby Brandt | Nicole Bender | | Regina, Saskatchewan |
| Celia Evans | Brooke Tracy | Julia Evans | Sierra Tracy | Marlise Carter | Oromocto, New Brunswick |
| Gloria Ezenta | Amarachi Aniogbu | Minengibi Alasebieton | Temitope Buhari | Chiamaka Nwagbo | Accra, Nigeria |
| Beth Farmer | Sophie Jackson | Kirstin Bousie | Emma Barr | | Kinross, Scotland |
| Tracy Fleury | Selena Njegovan | Liz Fyfe | Kristin MacCuish | | East St. Paul, Manitoba |
| Jolianne Fortin | Emy Lafrance | Megan Lafrance | Mégane Fortin | | Kenogami, Quebec |
| Susan Froud | Kristina Brauch | Kaelyn Gregory | Karen Rowsell | | Alliston, Ontario |
| Satsuki Fujisawa | Chinami Yoshida | Yumi Suzuki | Yurika Yoshida | | Kitami, Japan |
| Arisa Funaki | Rion Kudo | Yuko Ono | Yuzuko Sawada | Ayu Masaya | Japan |
| Jo-Ann Rizzo (Fourth) | Sarah Koltun | Margot Flemming | Kerry Galusha (Skip) | Megan Koehler | Yellowknife, Northwest Territories |
| Irantzu García | María Gómez | María Fernández | Ana Vázquez | Nerea Torralba | Vitoria-Gasteiz, Spain |
| Jaimee Gardner | Jaclyn Peters | Janie Wall | Alexis Riordan | | Ottawa, Ontario |
| Liz Garnett | Mary Myketyn-Driscoll | Julie McEvoy | Kaitlyn Veitch | Mary Day | Halifax, Nova Scotia |
| Hetty Garnier | Anna Fowler | Angharad Ward | Naomi Robinson | | Kent, England |
| Mandy Gebhardt | Allison Singh | Erin Cook | Morgan Lavell | | Guelph, Ontario |
| Samantha Gevers | Hannah Thiessen | Autumn Good | Quinn Allan | Julia van Ryssel | Winnipeg, Manitoba |
| Pearl Gillis | Tamara Bain | Adrianna Hendrick | Tyra Bain | Kamdyn Alexie | Inuvik, Northwest Territories |
| Gim Un-chi | Seol Ye-ji | Kim Su-ji | Seol Ye-eun | Park You-been | Uijeongbu, South Korea |
| Jacqueline Gimmel | Fabienne Gimmel | Roxanne Héritier | Annette Laubscher | Marianne Blaser | Bern, Switzerland |
| Julia Goodin | Courtney Berry | Michelle Majeau | Laurie Donaher | | Moncton, New Brunswick |
| Shelly Graham | Shelly Murray | Jennifer Scott | Robyn Witherell | | Fredericton, New Brunswick |
| Serena Gray-Withers | Zoe Cinnamon | Brianna Cullen | Emma Wiens | Anna Munroe | Edmonton, Alberta |
| Diane Gushulak | Stephanie Jackson-Baier | Carley Sandwith-Craig | Grace MacInnes | | New Westminster, British Columbia |
| Holly Hafeli | Jorja Kopytko | Hannah O'Neil | Natalie Hafeli | Eryn Czirfusz | Kamloops, British Columbia |
| Bella Hagenbuch | Genevieve Salander | Mae Hagenbuch | Lauren Hein | | (United States) Viola, Illinois |
| Caroline Hains | Josée Bédard | Nancy Mathieu | Michelle Conway | | Val-d'Or, Quebec |
| Nilla Hallström | Thea Sundgren | Agnes Alden | Wilma Danielsson | | Härnösand, Sweden |
| Cloe Haluschak | Laina Leadbeater | Matty Scales | Ava Keller | Liv Leadbeater | Swan River, Manitoba |
| Han Yu | Wang Rui | Dong Ziqi | Zhang Lijun | Jiang Xindi | Beijing, China |
| Jacqueline Harrison | Allison Flaxey | Lynn Kreviazuk | Laura Hickey | Kelly Middaugh | Dundas, Ontario |
| Michelle Hartwell | Katie Morrissey | Jody Grinde | Ashley Kalk | | Edmonton, Alberta |
| Anna Hasselborg | Sara McManus | Agnes Knochenhauer | Sofia Mabergs | | Sundbyberg, Sweden |
| Emily Haupstein | Skylar Ackerman | Taylor Stremick | Abbey Johnson | | Saskatoon, Saskatchewan |
| Shaela Hayward | Keira Krahn | Rylie Cox | India Young | | Carman, Manitoba |
| Heather Heggestad | Ginger Van Ymeren | Michelle Butler | Lauren Harrison | Julia Weagle | Thornhill, Ontario |
| Laura Heinimann | Kathrine Blackham | Johanna Blackham | Anika Meier | | Basel, Switzerland |
| Fay Henderson | Katie McMillan | Lisa Davie | Holly Wilkie-Milne | | Stirling, Scotland |
| Krysta Hilker | Karynn Flory | Sydney Lewko | Claire Murray | Kim Curtin | Edmonton, Alberta |
| Sarah Hill | Kelli Sharpe | Beth Hamilton | Adrienne Mercer | | St. John's, Newfoundland and Labrador |
| Tanya Hilliard | Taylor Clarke | Mackenzie Feindel | Heather MacPhee | Allyson Burgess | Halifax, Nova Scotia |
| Chantel Hoag | Jenna Pomedli | Kelsey Noyes | Lydia Zukewich | | Regina, Saskatchewan |
| Sarah Hoag | Stephanie Thompson | Cassidy Regush | Kelly Kay | | Regina, Saskatchewan |
| Hannah Farries (Fourth) | Inca Maguire | Annabelle Hof (Skip) | Holly Hamilton | Kirsty Farries | Stirling, Scotland |
| Amber Holland | Kim Schneider | Karlee Korchinski | Debbie Lozinski | | Kronau, Saskatchewan |
| Natalie Hollands | Sophia Ryhorchuk | Ella Fleming | Morgan Zacher | Jersey Hollands | (United States) Bowling Green, Ohio |
| Rachel Homan | Emma Miskew | Sarah Wilkes | Joanne Courtney | | Ottawa, Ontario |
| Kathy Hopfner | Connie Rayner | Sally Wiens | Melody Robertson | | Saskatchewan |
| Erica Hopson | Erin Morrissey | Alicia Krolak | Kim Brown | | Ottawa, Ontario |
| Lauren Horton | Dominique Jean | Brittany O'Rourke | Pamela Nugent | Lisa Davies | Dollard-des-Ormeaux, Quebec |
| Ashley Howard | Kourtney Fesser | Krista Fesser | Kaylin Skinner | | Saskatoon, Saskatchewan |
| Briar Hürlimann (Fourth) | Corrie Hürlimann (Skip) | Melina Bezzola | Anna Gut | Jessica Jäggi | Zug, Switzerland |
| Ling-Yue Hung | Ada Shang | Ashura Wong | Pianpian Hu | | Hong Kong |
| Danielle Inglis | Jessica Corrado | Stephanie Corrado | Cassandra de Groot | | Mississauga, Ontario |
| C. J. Jackson | Shianna Lind | Sarah Peters | Ruby Petkau | Anna Bakos | Lacombe, Alberta |
| Kristin Jaroki | Amber Montgomery | Leanne Cretin | Deanna Marcotte | | Weyburn, Saskatchewan |
| Joanne Tarvit (Fourth) | Shannon Jay (Skip) | Laura Neil | Jillian Page | | St. Thomas, Ontario |
| Emma Jensen | Jaycee Terrick | Rebecca Friesen | Julia Millan | | Winnipeg, Manitoba |
| Shawna Jensen | Layna Pohlod | Catera Park | Merit Thorson | | New Westminster, British Columbia |
| Daniela Jentsch | Emira Abbes | Mia Höhne | Analena Jentsch | Klara-Hermine Fomm | Füssen, Germany |
| Marnie Jepsen | Dianne Gauthier | Christine Matthews | Susan Allen | Leslie Hruby | New Westminster, British Columbia |
| Kaitlin Jewer | Melanie Ebach | Jessica Humphries | Terri Weeks | Joanna Francolini | Lindsay, Ontario |
| Hanna Johnson | Shantel Englot | Brooklyn Fahl | Kelsey Deptuck | | Moosomin, Saskatchewan |
| Chloe Johnston | Ava Koe | Katrina Minshull | Halla Grunow | | Okotoks, Alberta |
| Laura Johnston | Mackenzie Daley | Laura Forget | Amanda Corkal | | North Bay, Ontario |
| Jennifer Jones | Kaitlyn Lawes | Jocelyn Peterman | Dawn McEwen | Lisa Weagle | Winnipeg, Manitoba |
| Kaitlyn Jones (Fourth) | Abby Ackland (Skip) | Robyn Njegovan | Sara Oliver | | Winnipeg, Manitoba |
| Olivia Jones | Mercedes Smith | Micayla Kooistra | Emily Kiist | | Okotoks, Alberta |
| Samantha Jones | Abigail Marquardt | Ellie Vorpahl | Anna Armstrong | | (United States) Endeavor, Wisconsin |
| Sherry Just | Holly Scott | Alison Ingram | Deborah Hawkshaw | | Saskatoon, Saskatchewan |
| Henrietta Miklai (Fourth) | Vera Kalocsai-van Dorp (Skip) | Nikolett Sándor | Dorottya Micheller | Villő Hamvas | Budapest, Hungary |
| Asuka Kanai | Ami Enami | Mone Ryokawa | Junko Nishimuro | | Karuizawa, Japan |
| Kang Bo-bae | Park Han-byul | Choi Ye-jin | Lee You-sun | Cho Ju-hee | Uijeongbu, South Korea |
| Aleksandra Kardapoltseva | Anastasia Mischenko | Alina Lets | Daria Steksova | | Moscow, Russia |
| Selina Witschonke (Fourth) | Elena Mathis | Raphaela Keiser (Skip) | Marina Lörtscher | | St. Moritz, Switzerland |
| Elizabeth Kessel | Tesa Silversides | Mya Silversides | Hannah Rugg | | Moose Jaw, Saskatchewan |
| Cara Kesslering | Brylee Jeffries | Harper Doige | Kaylee Rosenfelt | | Yorkton, Saskatchewan |
| Adele Kezama-Purcell | Deanne Nichol | Meghan Chateauvert | Heather Steele | | St. Albert, Alberta |
| Mackenzie Kiemele | Katie Ford | Emma McKenzie | Jessica Filipcic | Megan Smith | Niagara Falls, Ontario |
| Kim Eun-jung | Kim Kyeong-ae | Kim Cho-hi | Kim Seon-yeong | Kim Yeong-mi | Gangneung, South Korea |
| Kim Ji-su | Jeong Jae-hee | Kang Na-ra | Lee Eun-chae | | Uijeongbu, South Korea |
| Kim Min-ji | Kim Hye-rin | Ha Seung-youn | Kim Su-jin | Yang Tae-i | Chuncheon, South Korea |
| Kim Min-seo | Shim Yu-jeong | Cho Da-hye | Kim Su-bin | Lee Seong-rin | Cheongju, South Korea |
| Kim Sur-yeong | Bang Yu-jin | Kim Hae-jeong | Kim Ji-hyeon | | Uiseong, South Korea |
| Ikue Kitazawa | Seina Nakajima | Minori Suzuki | Hasumi Ishigooka | Chiaki Matsumura | Nagano, Japan |
| Madison Kleiter | Kya Kennedy | Kelcee Kennedy | Mary Engel | | Saskatoon, Saskatchewan |
| Tori Koana | Yuna Kotani | Mao Ishigaki | Arisa Kotani | | Fujiyoshida, Japan |
| Beyzanur Konuksever | Selenay Diler | İfayet Şafak Çalıkuşu | Mihriban Polat | | Erzurum, Turkey |
| Anastasiia Kotova | Yaroslava Kalinichenko | Polina Putintseva | Sofiia Koverda | Oleksandra Kononenko | Ukraine |
| Alina Kovaleva | Yulia Portunova | Galina Arsenkina | Ekaterina Kuzmina | Maria Komarova | Saint Petersburg, Russia |
| Aubrey Kropf | Brianne Donegan | Erin Tester | Lauren Massey | Amelia Dolsen | Kitchener, Ontario |
| Anna Kubešková | Alžběta Baudyšová | Petra Vinšová | Ežen Kolčevská | Michaela Baudyšová | Prague, Czech Republic |
| Akiko Kudo | Shizuko Funaki | Mutumi Takata | Chizuko Hamadate | Tuyako Yokouchi | Japan |
| Mizuho Kumagai | Eri Suzuki | Asuke Sakamoto | Haruka Nakata | Midori Takahashi | Japan |
| Claudia Lacell | Alyssa Resch | Madison Ross | Amelia Kreis | | Moose Jaw, Saskatchewan |
| Isabelle Ladouceur | Jamie Smith | Lauren Rajala | Katie Shaw | Katy Lukowich | Sudbury, Ontario |
| Kaydence Lalonde | Haylee Bindig | Samantha Carnie | Melissa Douglas | | Saskatoon, Saskatchewan |
| Marlene Lang | Pam Kok | Jackie Henderson | Megan Pauls | | Winnipeg, Manitoba |
| Lee Eun-chae | Yang Seung-hee | Jeong Min-jae | Kang Min-hyo | | Uiseong, South Korea |
| Lee Jeon-ga | Seo Ji-ho | Kim Bo-mi | Ban Hye-jin | | Seoul, South Korea |
| Emily Lindsay | Cassandra Lewin | Chloe Bourguignon | Jessica Thorne | | Ottawa, Ontario |
| Kim Link | Colleen Kilgallen | Karen Fallis | Renee Fletcher | Lynn Fallis-Kurz | East St. Paul, Manitoba |
| Tene Link | Ulle Lumiste | Kaja Liik-Tamm | Marcella Tammes | | Tallinn, Estonia |
| Marie-Elaine Little | Abby Deschene | Keira McLaughlin | Zoe Valliere | | Sudbury, Ontario |
| Cailey Locke | Katie Peddigrew | Sitaye Penney | Kate Young | | St. John's, Newfoundland and Labrador |
| Annina Loritz | Nadja Hophan | Mia Loritz | Alexia Hengsberger | | Baden, Switzerland |
| Amy MacDonald | Susie Smith | Eilidh Yeats | Nicola Joiner | | Stirling, Scotland |
| Rachel MacLean | Sydney Howatt | Lexie Murray | Abby Barker | | Cornwall, Prince Edward Island |
| Kayla MacMillan | Jody Maskiewich | Lindsay Dubue | Sarah Loken | | Vancouver, British Columbia |
| Brigitte MacPhail | Sadie Pinksen | Kaitlin MacDonald | Alison Taylor | | Iqaluit, Nunavut |
| Hannah MacRaild | Isabel Sah | Ava Schapman | Mallory MacRaild | | (United States) Cleveland, Ohio |
| Morgan Maguet | Kylie Lippens | Lauren Evason | Danica Metcalfe | | East St. Paul, Manitoba |
| Lauren Mann | Kira Brunton | Cheryl Kreviazuk | Karen Trines | Marcia Richardson | Ottawa, Ontario |
| Sayuri Matsuhashi | Yu Yokoyama | Eri Nasu | Kayo Ogawa | Yuko Tomita | Tokyo, Japan |
| Mary Mattatall | Marg Cutcliffe | Jill Alcoe-Holland | Andrea Saulnier | | Halifax, Nova Scotia |
| Daniela Matulová | Lucia Orokocká | Slávka Makovníková | Martina Ščepková | | Bratislava, Slovakia |
| Krista McCarville | Kendra Lilly | Ashley Sippala | Sarah Potts | | Thunder Bay, Ontario |
| Andie McDonald | Miranda Scheel | Abigail Page | Bella Hagenbuch | | (United States) Tempe, Arizona |
| Kristy McDonald | Lisa Blixhavn | Leslie Wilson-Westcott | Raunora Westcott | Lindsay Warkentin | Winnipeg, Manitoba |
| Christine McMakin | Jackie Lemke | Jenna Burchesky | Maya Willertz | Nicole Prohaska | (United States) Fargo, North Dakota |
| Eirin Mesloe | Torild Bjørnstad | Nora Østgård | Ingeborg Forbregd | | Oslo, Norway |
| Elisa Scheuerl (Fourth) | Zoé Antes | Sara Messenzehl (Skip) | Kim Sutor | | Füssen, Germany |
| Gunta Millere | Dace Zīle | Elēna Kāpostiņa | Inga Apmane | | Riga, Latvia |
| Mayu Minami | Kana Ogawa | Suzune Yasui | Momo Kaneta | Nao Kyoto | Sapporo, Japan |
| Shellan Miskiman | Keana Whyley | Abi Reed | Arizona LaClare | | Tisdale, Saskatchewan |
| Amy Mitchell | Kirsty Gallacher | Chloe McNaughton | Jodi Bass | | Greenacres, Howwood, Scotland |
| Jessica Mitchell | Jenna Hope | Meaghan Frerichs | Teresa Waterfield | | Saskatoon, Saskatchewan |
| Mackenzie Mitchell | Katie Follett | Sarah Chaytor | Kate Paterson | | St. John's, Newfoundland and Labrador |
| Melba Mitchell | Alison Lennie | Wilhelmina Lennie | Eleanor Jerome | | Inuvik, Northwest Territories |
| Emma Moberg | Rebecka Thunman | Emma Landelius | Mikaela Altebro | | Stockholm, Sweden |
| Rebecca Morrison | Gina Aitken | Sophie Sinclair | Sophie Jackson | | Stirling, Scotland |
| Mari Motohashi | Yako Matsuzawa | Miki Hayashi | Mayumi Saito | Ayumi Aoki | Kitami, Japan |
| Sarah Müller | Malin Da Ros | Marion Wüest | Selina Gafner | Xenia Schwaller | Biel, Switzerland |
| Lisa Muhmenthaler | Selina Studer | Janine Wyss | Jana Stritt | Corina Mani | Bern, Switzerland |
| Eve Muirhead | Vicky Wright | Jennifer Dodds | Hailey Duff | Mili Smith | Stirling, Scotland |
| Robyn Munro | Robyn Mitchell | Beth Rowley | Laura Watt | | Stranraer, Scotland |
| Jestyn Murphy | Carly Howard | Stephanie Matheson | Grace Holyoke | Janet Murphy | Mississauga, Ontario |
| Misaki Tanaka (Fourth) | Miori Nakamura (Skip) | Haruka Kihira | Emiko Koyama | Hiyori Ichinohe | Japan |
| Yukihiko Nakamura | Yuraki Koana | Ayane Amano | Yukie Yamakawa | | Japan |
| Yana Nekrasova | Ekaterina Telnova | Polina Nikolaeva | Alevtina Muraveva | | Moscow, Russia |
| Miku Nihira | Mina Kobayashi | Mikoto Nakajima | Honoka Sasaki | | Sapporo, Japan |
| Irina Nizovtseva | Liudmila Privivkova | Olga Kotelnikova | Vera Tiuliakova | Iulia Chemodanova | Moscow, Russia |
| Hannah Northwood | Irelande McMahon | Jada Walls | Brynne Masson | Hudsyn Palyszniuk | Airdrie, Alberta |
| Ksenia Novikova | Maria Tsebriy | Natalia Gubanova | Anastasia Golitsyna | | Moscow, Russia |
| Emily Ogg | Mikaylah Lyburn | Katie Zacharias | Mackenzie Arbuckle | Emily Zacharias | Winnipeg, Manitoba |
| Kaoru Ito (Fourth) | Juri Ojima (Skip) | Chieri Yamashita | Kyoko Yokoyama | Satoko Togawa | Japan |
| Isis Oliveira | Sarah Lipi | Kenya Franz | Marcelia Melo | | São Paulo, Brazil |
| Katherine Gourianova (Fourth) | Sara Olson (Skip) | Elizabeth Janiak | Anne O'Hara | | (United States) Potomac, Maryland |
| Sherilee Orsted | Candace Newkirk | Shalon Fleming | Jasmine Kerr | Carla Anaka | Regina, Saskatchewan |
| Virginija Paulauskaitė | Olga Dvojeglazova | Dovilė Aukštuolytė | Rūta Blažienė | | Vilnius, Lithuania |
| Beth Peterson | Jenna Loder | Katherine Doerksen | Melissa Gordon | | Winnipeg, Manitoba |
| Tabitha Peterson | Nina Roth | Becca Hamilton | Tara Peterson | Aileen Geving | (United States) Chaska, Minnesota |
| Melissa Pierce | Jennifer Van Wieren | Megan Anderson | Kelly Erickson | | Edmonton, Alberta |
| Myla Plett | Rachel Jacques | Alyssa Nedohin | Lauren Miller | Chloe Fediuk | Airdrie, Alberta |
| Kenna Ponzio | Christine Whear | Alyssa Hahn | Carly Setter | Natasha Swatzina | (United States) Lakeville, Minnesota |
| Marlee Powers | Sarah Mallais | Jocelyn Adams | Amanda Simpson | Emily Dwyer | Halifax, Nova Scotia |
| Ekaterina Prytkova | Karina Kurak | Arina Rusina | Nika Nikitina | | Moscow, Russia |
| Taylor Reese-Hansen | Megan McGillivray | Cierra Fisher | Sydney Brilz | | Kitimat, British Columbia |
| Evita Regža | Elīza Stabulniece | Betina Gulbe | Katrīna Gaidule | | Riga, Latvia |
| Marijke Reitsma | Verena Pflügler | Jill Witschen | Johanna Höß | Julia Kotek | Kitzbühel, Austria |
| Hannah Rempel | Vivian Schmeeckle | Megan Rempel | Lauren Cochrane | | Kelowna, British Columbia |
| Kim Rhyme | Libby Brundage | Cait Flannery | Katie Rhyme | | (United States) Minneapolis, Minnesota |
| Brette Richards | Blaine de Jager | Alyssa Kyllo | Rachelle Kallechy | Patti Knezevic | Vernon, British Columbia |
| Gracelyn Richards | Keelie Duncan | Grace McCusker | Carley Hardie | | Comox Valley, British Columbia |
| Fabienne Rieder | Tina Zürcher | Nadine Rieder | Selina Rychiger | Najda Hophanan | Bern, Switzerland |
| Darcy Robertson | Laura Burtnyk | Gaetanne Gauthier | Krysten Karwacki | | Winnipeg, Manitoba |
| Elaine Robson | Candace Newkirk | Malysha Johnstone | Sheri Logan | | Moose Jaw, Saskatchewan |
| Kelsey Rocque | Danielle Schmiemann | Dana Ferguson | Rachelle Brown | | Edmonton, Alberta |
| Kristin Skaslien (Fourth) | Marianne Rørvik (Skip) | Mille Haslev Nordbye | Martine Rønning | Eli Skaslien | Oslo, Norway |
| Cassie Rogers | Chasity O'Keefe | Kali Skauge | Grace Twa | | Yellowknife, Northwest Territories |
| Everly Royea | Alex Ashton | Kate Hancock | Madison Marlow | | Chilliwack, British Columbia |
| Vlada Rumiantseva | Aleksandra Mozzherina | Aleksandra Stoyarosova | Ekaterina Kungurova | Irina Riazanova | Moscow, Russia |
| Jessica Rutter | Kelsey Meger | Lisa Birchard | Jenessa Rutter | Breanne Yozenko | Winnipeg, Manitoba |
| Kristen Ryan | Megan Daniels | Kirsten Fox | Dawn Mesana | | British Columbia |
| Abbey Salari | Avery Sinasac | Grace Elliot | Rebecca Rankin | | Grimsby, Ontario |
| Deb Santos | Lorna Alfrey | Lil Grabinsky | Sandy Tougas | Michelle Heartwell | Edmonton, Alberta |
| Asami Sasada | Naoko Yamauchi | Yoko Taki | Kanae Kitagawa | | Japan |
| Casey Scheidegger | Cary-Anne McTaggart | Jessie Haughian | Kristie Moore | | Lethbridge, Alberta |
| Lorraine Schneider | Larisa Murray | Ashley Williamson | Jill de Gooijer | | Regina, Saskatchewan |
| Irene Schori | Carole Howald | Lara Stocker | Stefanie Berset | | Langenthal, Switzerland |
| Bayly Scoffin | Neizha Snider | Taylor Legge | Dannika Mikkelsen | | Whitehorse, Yukon |
| Jennifer Scott | Cindy Westgard | Gwyneth Turner | Alison Howes | | Edmonton, Alberta |
| Mandy Selzer | Erin Barnhart | Megan Selzer | Sarah Slywka | | Regina, Saskatchewan |
| Stephanie Senneker | Maya Willertz | Jenna Burchesky | Clare Moores | | (United States) Kalamazoo, Michigan |
| Kayleigh Shannon | Anika Villemaire | Amy Janz | Jaelyn Macrae | | Lethbridge, Alberta |
| Marla Sherrer | Chantele Broderson | Julie Selvais | Sarah Drummond | | Lacombe, Alberta |
| Anne Shibuya | Luciana Barrella | Debora Monteiro | Leticia Cid | | São Paulo, Brazil |
| Mei Shimohori | Satomi Arakida | Rio Matsubara | Moko Nakasato | Ako Nakasato | Japan |
| Shin Ga-yeong | Song Yu-jin | Lee Ji-yeong | Shin Eun-jin | | Jeonbuk, South Korea |
| Momono Shirahata | Youko Ishida | Sara Fujita | Honoka Ohara | Maika Sawamukai | Kitami, Japan |
| Britta Sillaots | Lembe Marley | Kaidi Elmik | Anna Gromova | | Tallinn, Estonia |
| Robyn Silvernagle | Kristen Streifel | Jessie Hunkin | Dayna Demers | Becca Hebert | North Battleford, Saskatchewan |
| Jamie Sinclair | Monica Walker | Cora Farrell | Elizabeth Cousins | | (United States) Charlotte, North Carolina |
| Kayla Skrlik | Geri-Lynn Ramsay | Brittany Tran | Ashton Skrlik | | Calgary, Alberta |
| Amanda Smith | Hailey Brittain | Meaghan Pouget | Nicole Musselman | | London, Ontario |
| Veronica Smith | Julia Hunter | Emily Gray | Sabrina Smith | | Charlottetown, Prince Edward Island |
| Cynthia St-Georges | Hannah Gargul | Amber Gargul | Florence Boivin | Elizabeth Cyr | Laval, Quebec |
| Laurie St-Georges | Hailey Armstrong | Emily Riley | Cynthia St-Georges | Isabelle Thiboutot | Laval, Quebec |
| Elīza Stabulniece | Katrīna Gaidule | Marija Seliverstova | Betija Gulbe | | Riga, Latvia |
| Rachel Steele | Grace Cave | Jillian Uniacke | Sadie McCutcheon | | Toronto, Ontario |
| Tiffany Steuber | Brittany Martin | Jen Person | Brittany Zelmer | | Edmonton, Alberta |
| Taylour Stevens | Lauren Ferguson | Alison Umlah | Cate Fitzgerald | Maria Fitzgerald | Chester, Nova Scotia |
| Erin Stewart | Tia Laurie | Katie Donald | Jessica Trotter | | Dumfries, Scotland |
| Kellie Stiksma | Ocean Pletz | Jamie Scott | Bailey Horte | Sara McMann | Edmonton, Alberta |
| Delaney Strouse | Sydney Mullaney | Susan Dudt | Rebecca Rodgers | | (United States) Minneapolis, Minnesota |
| Selena Sturmay | Abby Marks | Catherine Clifford | Paige Papley | Kate Goodhelpsen | Edmonton, Alberta |
| Tova Sundberg | Emma Sjödin | Linnéa Svedberg | Sofie Bergman | Fanny Sjöberg | Östersund, Sweden |
| Sierra Sutherland | Adrienne Belliveau | Chelsea Ferrier | Julie Breton | Kyrsten Elson | Ottawa, Ontario |
| Megumi Kanai | Maka Yamada | Akane Suzuki | Yuri Nakajima | | Kanagawa, Japan |
| Natsuko Suzuki | Tomomi Noguchi | Iori Komatsu | Naomi Kusakabe | | Japan |
| Jacquie Swiderski | Avis Halcro | Leslie Blacklock | Alice Daley | Faye Tam | Prince Albert, Saskatchewan |
| Ildikó Szekeres (Fourth) | Linda Joó | Ágnes Szentannai (Skip) | Laura Nagy | Gyöngyi Nagy | Budapest, Hungary |
| Momoha Tabata | Miku Nihira | Mikoto Nakajima | Ayami Ito | | Sapporo, Japan |
| Yuuna Takahashi | Yuina Miura | Ai Matsunaga | Yuna Sakuma | | Nayoro, Japan |
| Anna Tamboli | Jordan Hein | Amelia Hintz | Teagan Thurston | Ava Roessler | (United States) Portage, Wisconsin |
| Miyu Tanaka | Risa Tuzimura | Miyu Wakita | Kanami Muguruma | Maho Shichijyou | Obihiro, Japan |
| Ayako Tanimoto | Asako Kuroiwa | Rina Kohara | Akane Sasaki | | Japan |
| Savanna Taylor | Annika Steckler | Ava Beausoleil | Katlyn Kennedy | Leah Beausoleil | Saskatoon, Saskatchewan |
| Zoey Terrick | Cassidy Dundas | Tessa Terrick | Madison Sagert | Richelle Forgue | Neepawa, Manitoba |
| Lindsay Thorne | Rebecca Smith | Emily Kelly | Brooke Davies | | Ottawa, Ontario |
| Alina Pätz (Fourth) | Silvana Tirinzoni (Skip) | Esther Neuenschwander | Melanie Barbezat | | Aarau, Switzerland |
| Mao Tjarnlund | Mao Nilsson | Thea Orefjord | Moa Dryburgh | | Sundbyberg, Sweden |
| Mizuki Tmura | Ami Tonozaki | Annzu Takamatu | Kohane Toruga | Mizuki Hara | Japan |
| Talyia Tober | Tansy Tober | Lexa Sigurdson | Stephanie Feeleus | | Winnipeg, Manitoba |
| Tansy Tober | Caitlin Kostna | Lexa Sigurdson | Stephanie Feeleus | | Fort Garry, Manitoba |
| Elizaveta Trukhina | Valeria Denisenko | Nina Polikarpova | Alina Fakhurtdinova | Viktoria Desova | Irkutsk, Russia |
| Alina Tschumakow | Kaitlin Murphy | Anna Cenzalli | Celeste Taylor | | (United States) Boston, Massachusetts |
| Kim Tuck | Katie Cottrill | Marteen Jones | Jordan Morrison | | Wingham, Ontario |
| Kerli Laidsalu (Fourth) | Liisa Turmann (Skip) | Heili Grossmann | Erika Tuvike | Karoliine Kaare | Tallinn, Estonia |
| Terry Ursel | Wanda Rainka | Chris Hamblin | Tracy Igonia | Brenda Walker | Neepawa, Manitoba |
| Asta Vaičekonytė | Lina Januleviciute | Aiste Krasauskaite | Grazina Eitutiene | | Vilnius, Lithuania |
| Danielle Berus (Fourth) | Veerle Geerinckx | Kim Catteceur | Caro van Oosterwyck (Skip) | Annemiek Huiskamp | Belgium |
| Claire Viau | Megan McPhee | Ella Wendling | Ellery Bazley | | (United States) Portage, Wisconsin |
| Dayna Wahl | Piper Stoesz | Anna Ginters | Gillian Hildebrand | | Altona, Manitoba |
| Reese Wainman | Alex Testart-Campbell | Brooke Smith | Whitney Kasook | | Inuvik, Northwest Territories |
| Laura Walker | Kate Cameron | Taylor McDonald | Nadine Scotland | | Edmonton, Alberta |
| Emma Wallingford | Rhonda Varnes | Melissa Gannon | Kayla Gray | | Ottawa, Ontario |
| Quinn Walsh | Anneka Burghout | Lindsay Geerkens | Rachel Dobbs | | Waterloo, Ontario |
| Meghan Walter | Lane Prokopwich | Katie McKenzie | Mackenzie Elias | | Winnipeg, Manitoba |
| Sarah Wark | Kristen Pilote | Nicky Kaufman | Karla Thompson | | Abbotsford, British Columbia |
| Maddy Warriner | Alyssa Blad | Madison Fisher | Shannon Warriner | Sarah Bailey | Dundas, Ontario |
| Katelyn Wasylkiw | Lauren Wasylkiw | Stephanie Thompson | Erin Way | | Whitby, Ontario |
| Kristy Watling | Hailey Ryan | Emilie Rafsnon | Sarah Pyke | | Winnipeg, Manitoba |
| Amy Wheatcroft | Ashley Dezura | Brook Aleksic | Hannah Smeed | | Victoria, British Columbia |
| Kayla Wilson | Mahra Harris | Sasha Wilson | Madison Penttila | | Victoria, British Columbia |
| Stasia Wisniewski | Chantel Martin | Amanda Kuzyk | Sheri Martin | | Regina, Saskatchewan |
| Emma Woike | Madison Munroe | Marijke MacDonald | Maddie Buhr | | Duncan, British Columbia |
| Bryelle Wong | Morgan Bowles | Taylor Bowles | Alexis Nguyen | | New Westminster, British Columbia |
| Gabby Wood | Payton Sonnenberg | Brenna Bilassy | Ashleigh McKinnon | Shirley Thompson | Edmonton, Alberta |
| Rachel Workin | Lexi Lanigan | Ann Podoll | Christina Lammers | | (United States) Fargo, North Dakota |
| Isabella Wranå | Almida de Val | Jennie Wåhlin | Maria Larsson | | Sundbyberg, Sweden |
| Ladina Müller (Fourth) | Nora Wüest (Skip) | Anna Stern | Karin Winter | Lisa Gugler | Wetzikon, Switzerland |
| Jessica Wytrychowski | Jessica Koch | Krista Shortridge | Cheryl Damen | | Airdrie, Alberta |
| Miyu Ueno (Fourth) | Eri Ogihara | Yui Ueno | Sae Yamamoto (Skip) | | Karuizawa, Japan |
| Misato Yanagisawa | Hinako Hase | Hinako Sonobe | Kotono Chiyoda | | Japan |
| Dilşat Yıldız | Öznur Polat | Berfin Şengül | Ayşe Gözütok | Mihriban Polat | Erzurum, Turkey |
| Ayumi Yokota | Shinobu Yamasaski | Kumiko Hirayama | Sumiko Takekawa | | Chiba, Japan |
| Sayaka Yoshimura | Kaho Onodera | Anna Ohmiya | Yumie Funayama | Momoha Tabata | Sapporo, Japan |
| Mackenzie Zacharias | Karlee Burgess | Emily Zacharias | Lauren Lenentine | | Altona, Manitoba |
| Lea Žemlja (Fourth) | Ajda Zaveljcina (Skip) | Ema Kavčič | Maja Kučina | Nika Černe | Ljubljana, Slovenia |
| Maruša Gorišek (Fourth) | Ajda Zavartanik Drglin (Skip) | Petra Klemenc | Anja Pečaver | | Slovenia |
| Tori Zemmelink | McKenna McGovern | Emily Middaugh | Celeste Gauthier | Larissa Musselman | Cambridge, Ontario |
| Josie Zimmerman | Bryn Woloshyn | Claire Bevan-Stewart | Emma Wiens | Hope Zimmerman | Camrose, Alberta |
| Nola Zingel | Heather Kuntz | Melissa Butler | Jill Watson | | Lloydminster, Alberta |

== Mixed doubles ==
As of May 15, 2022

| Female | Male | Locale |
|---|---|---|
| Jazmin Ackerman | Brett Behm | Saskatoon, Saskatchewan |
| Skylar Ackerman | Daymond Bernath | Saskatoon, Saskatchewan |
| Audra Adams | Patrick Connolly | (United States) Cincinnati, Ohio |
| Melissa Adams | Alex Robichaud | Fredericton, New Brunswick |
| Ahn Jeong-yeon | Kim Eun-bin | Gyeongbuk, South Korea |
| Gina Aitken | Euan Kyle | Stirling, Scotland |
| Flannery Allison | Michael Allison | (United States) St. Louis, Missouri |
| Sitora Alliyarova | Aidos Alliyar | Almaty, Kazakhstan |
| Tilsimay Alliyarova | Sergei Venevtsev | Almaty, Kazakhstan |
| Sarah Anderson | Korey Dropkin | (United States) Duluth, Minnesota |
| Olga Antonova | Oleg Krasikov | Saint Petersburg, Russia |
| Tone Aspeli | Marius Aspeli | Hedmarken, Norway |
| Hannah Augustin | Martin Reichel | Kitzbühel, Austria |
| Nicole Avalon | Sean Franey | (United States) Oakland, California |
| Anastasia Babarykina | Konstantin Manasevich | Saint Petersburg, Russia |
| Sarah Bailey | Dylan Sipura | St. Catharines, Ontario |
| Bang Yu-jin | Seol Dong-seok | Gyeongbuk, South Korea |
| Brett Barber | Brayden Grindheim | Martensville, Saskatchewan |
| Daina Barone | Arnis Veidemanis | Riga, Latvia |
| Madison Bear | Andrew Stopera | (United States) Chaska, Minnesota |
| Kristen Beaumont | Steven Michaeleski | Winnipeg, Manitoba |
| Karen Bédard-Lothrop | Todd Rivett | Estrie, Quebec |
| Olivia Beirnes | Kyle Forster | Elmira, Ontario |
| Corrie Belanger | Craig Coyne | Vancouver, British Columbia |
| Maria Beliaeva | Aleksandr Utkin | Yaroslavl, Russia |
| Sophie Belley | Roger Lavoie | Clermont, Quebec |
| Adrienne Belliveau | Jordan McNamara | Ottawa, Ontario |
| Sofie Bergman | Jacob Hanna | Stocksund, Sweden |
| Susanne Beriault | Kayle Miller | Winnipeg, Manitoba |
| Vicki Berlin | Jakob Hjort | Copenhagen, Denmark |
| Marie-Jo Billo | Marc Trahan | Trois-Rivières, Quebec |
| Shannon Birchard | Catlin Schneider | Winnipeg, Manitoba / White City, Saskatchewan |
| Regan Birr | Todd Birr | (United States) Blaine, Minnesota |
| Marta Blacha | Borys Jasiecki | Łódź, Poland |
| Shana Bobowski | Rob Bobowski | Calgary, Alberta |
| Florence Boivin | Yannick Martel | Saguenay, Quebec |
| Lisenka Bomas | Bob Bomas | Zoetermeer, Netherlands |
| Nicole Bookhout | Dan Wiza | (United States) Madison, Wisconsin |
| Anastasia Borisova | Roman Serebrennikov | Tomsk, Russia |
| Veronique Bouchard | Jean-François Charest | Saguenay, Quebec |
| Helene Boucher | David Simard | Montreal, Quebec |
| Shelby Brandt | Grady LaMontagne | Regina, Saskatchewan |
| Marianne Brassard | Philippe Brassard | Quebec, Quebec |
| Sophie Brissette | Kris Gira | Okotoks, Alberta |
| Chantele Broderson | Kyler Kleibrink | Calgary, Alberta |
| Nicole Brown | Ryan Smith | (United States) Charlotte, North Carolina |
| Kira Brunton | Brett Lyon-Hatcher | Ottawa, Ontario |
| Jenna Burchesky | Ben Richardson | (United States) Walpole, Massachusetts |
| Sherrie Burechailo-Dias | Jeff Barkun | British Columbia |
| Sarah Burns | Scott Piroth | (United States) Bowling Green, Ohio |
| Sarah Bush | Ryan Quinn | (United States) Charlotte, North Carolina |
| Michelle Butler | Jerry Butler | Cambridge, Ontario |
| Aleksandra Bylina | Karol Nowakowski | Łódź, Poland |
| Chrissy Cadorin | Rob Ainsley | Toronto, Ontario |
| Jenna Campbell | James Carr | Fredericton, New Brunswick |
| Jolene Campbell | Brady Scharback | Regina, Saskatchewan |
| Kristine Campbell | Mike Libbus | Okotoks, Alberta |
| Jessica Captain | Nicholas Visnich | (United States) Pittsburgh, Pennsylvania |
| Chelsea Carey | Colin Hodgson | Calgary, Alberta / Red Lake, Ontario |
| Gloria Chao | Anthony Fowler | (United States) Chicago, Illinois |
| Lauren Cheal | Greg Cheal | Montreal / Valleyfield, Quebec |
| Cho Da-hye | Shim Ju-hwan | Cheongju, South Korea |
| Amanda Chou | Brendon Liu | Taipei, Chinese Taipei |
| Cory Christensen | John Shuster | (United States) Duluth, Minnesota |
| Alice Cobelli | Amos Mosaner | Trentino, Italy |
| Susana Cole | Tijani Cole | (United States) Broomfield, Colorado / Accra, Nigeria |
| Marie-Claude Comeau | Simon Hebert | Vallyfield, Quebec |
| Stefania Constantini | Amos Mosaner | Trentino, Italy |
| Jaelyn Cotter | Jim Cotter | Vernon, British Columbia |
| Katie Cottrill | Shawn Cottrill | Wingham, Ontario |
| Joanne Courtney | Darren Moulding | Edmonton, Alberta |
| Andrea Crawford | Chris Schnare | Fredericton, New Brunswick |
| Kelsie Cygan | Ethan Chung | Edmonton, Alberta |
| Eryn Czirfusz | Coburn Fadden | British Columbia |
| Mikayla Czirfusz | Andrew Nerpin | British Columbia |
| Cheryl Damen | Tyler van Amsterdam | Edmonton, Alberta |
| Hanna Davis | Steve Davis | Mississauga, Ontario |
| Almida de Val | Oskar Eriksson | Sundbyberg, Sweden |
| Casey DenHartigh | Matthew Kenlan | (United States) Charlotte, North Carolina |
| Valeria Denisenko | Kirill Palagney | Irkutsk, Russia |
| Abby Deschene | Jacob Horgan | Sudbury / Kingston, Ontario |
| Émilie Desjardins | Robert Desjardins | Saguenay, Quebec |
| Louise Desrosiers | Alain Bellemare | Quebec, Quebec |
| Julia DiBaggio | Michael Mann | (United States) Cleveland, Ohio |
| Zhanat Dilbarkhanova | Alexander Kan | Almaty, Kazakhstan |
| Jennifer Dodds | Bruce Mouat | Stirling, Scotland |
| Amelia Dolsen | Matt Pretty | Barrie, Ontario |
| Blaire Dorsey | Tyler Chamberlain | (United States) Bowling Green, Ohio |
| Susan Dudt | Daniel Dudt | (United States) Philadelphia, Pennsylvania |
| Hailey Duff | Hammy McMillan Jr. | Stirling, Scotland |
| Mhairi-Bronté Duncan | Brett Sargon | Naseby, New Zealand |
| Shannon Dunphy | Chris Perlson | (United States) Cincinnati, Ohio |
| Angelina Ebauyer | Adil Zhumagozha | Almaty, Kazakhstan |
| Regina Ebauyer | Viktor Kim | Almaty, Kazakhstan |
| Lori Eddy | Joey Rettinger | Dundas, Ontario |
| Kerri Einarson | Brad Jacobs | Camp Morton, Manitoba / Sault Ste. Marie, Ontario |
| Krista Ellingson | Carl deConinck Smith | Regina, Saskatchewan |
| Grace Elliott | Loris Elliott | Lambton Shores, Ontario |
| Kaidi Elmik | Mihhail Vlassov | Tallinn, Estonia |
| Brittany Elson | Spencer Cheesman | Barrie, Ontario |
| Viktoria Enbaeva | Petr Dron | Saint Petersburg, Russia |
| Michelle Englot | Derek Schneider | Regina, Saskatchewan |
| Izzat Ergashova | Dimitriy Garagul | Almaty, Kazakhstan |
| Nkeirouka Ezekh | Alexey Stukalskiy | Moscow, Russia |
| Alina Fakhurtdinova | Mikhail Vlasenko | Irkutsk, Russia |
| Fan Suyuan | Ling Zhi | Beijing, China |
| Hannah Farries | Rory Macnair | Stirling, Scotland |
| Aline Fellmann | Chris Kovalchuk | Montreal, Quebec |
| Martina Fenyková | Martin Votava | Prague, Czech Republic |
| Marie Fillion | Martin Fillion | Clermont, Quebec |
| Allison Flaxey | Pat Janssen | Toronto, Ontario |
| Stacey Fordyce | Steve Irwin | Brandon, Manitoba |
| Leanne Fortin | Eric Fortin | Saguenay, Quebec |
| Melissa Foster | Scott Foster | Burlington, Ontario |
| Geneviève Frappier | Martin Begin | Montreal, Quebec |
| Kitty Freeborn | Kevin Freeborn | British Columbia |
| Anastasiia Frolova | Ivan Osolodkov | Bishkek, Kyrgyzstan |
| Leslie Inglis | Riley Fung-Ernst | Oakville, Ontario |
| Cynthia Furlotte | David Daoust | Sudbury, Ontario |
| Nathalie Gagnon | Jay Merchant | Sydney, Australia |
| Katrīna Gaidule | Ansis Regza | Riga, Latvia |
| April Gale-Seixeiro | Steve Seixeiro | Lisbon, Portugal |
| Amber Gargul | Nicolas Beauchemin | Pointe-Claire, Quebec |
| Hannah Gargul | Brendan Jackson | Pointe-Claire, Quebec |
| Diana Gaspari | Joël Retornaz | Cortina d'Ampezzo, Italy |
| Amanda Gates | Trevor Bonot | Thunder Bay, Ontario |
| Mandy Gebhardt | Andrew Fairfull | Guelph, Ontario |
| Veerle Geerinckx | Dirk Heylen | Zemst, Belgium |
| Nathalie Gendron | Martin Gauthier | Quebec |
| Aileen Geving | Luc Violette | (United States) Duluth, Minnesota |
| Tahli Gill | Dean Hewitt | Brisbane, Australia |
| Gim Un-chi | Jeong Yeong-seok | Gyeonggi, South Korea |
| Veronique Gingras | Jacques Boisvert | Trois-Rivières, Quebec |
| Marianne Girard | Marc-Alexandre Charest-Dion | Quebec, Quebec |
| Anna Glazyrina | Evgeny Supletsov | Novosibirsk, Russia |
| Brigitte Gosselin | Donald Boivin | Estrie, Quebec |
| Clancy Grandy | Pat Janssen | Pickering, Ontario |
| Sheri Greenman | Michael Zuliani | Unionville, Ontario |
| Katarzyna Grzelka | Aleksander Grzelka | Łódź, Poland |
| Christianne Guay | Gervais Lavoie | Montreal, Quebec |
| Ha Seung-youn | Park Sang-woo | Gangwon, South Korea |
| Holly Hafeli | Mitchell Kopytko | Vernon, British Columbia |
| Paulina Hajduk | Ján Horáček | Bratislava, Slovakia |
| Lisa Hale | Ray Baker | Dauphin, Manitoba |
| Chris Hamblin | Lorne Hamblin | Morris, Manitoba |
| Becca Hamilton | Matt Hamilton | (United States) Madison, Wisconsin |
| Louise Harkinn | Trond Erik Standerholen | Hedmarken, Norway |
| Rachel Harms | Steven Michaleski | Winnipeg, Manitoba |
| Marie-Pier Harvey | Sebastien Simard | Alma, Quebec |
| Deanna Harvie | Joey Rettinger | Tara, Ontario |
| Kim Headley | John Headley | Aurora, Ontario |
| Johanna Heldin | Daniel Magnusson | Uppsala, Sweden |
| Henriette Lokken Helgevold | Gaute Nepstad | Hedmarken, Norway |
| Patty Hersikorn | Steve Laycock | Saskatoon, Saskatchewan |
| Chantel Hoag | Josh Bryden | Regina, Saskatchewan |
| Sarah Hoag | Ty Dilello | Regina, Saskatchewan |
| Kim Hodson | Shawn Joyce | Saskatoon, Saskatchewan |
| Grace Holyoke | Thomas Ryan | Kitchener–Waterloo, Ontario |
| Rachel Homan | John Morris | Canmore, Alberta |
| Erica Hopson | Kevin Tippett | Ottawa, Ontario |
| Lauren Horton | Pierre-Luc Morissette | Quebec, Quebec |
| Lea Hueppi | Jonas Weiss | Küsnacht, Switzerland |
| Manon Humbert | David Baumgartner | Megève, France |
| Ling-Yue Hung | Jason Chang | Hong Kong, Hong Kong |
| Lotta Immonen | Markus Sipilä | Eckerö, Finland |
| Elin Ingvaldsen | Christer Wibe | Oslo, Norway |
| Rikke Iversen | Rune Lorentsen | Halden, Norway |
| Sarah Jagger | Chris Wai | Toronto, Ontario |
| Jang Hye-ji | Jeon Byeong-wook | Gyeongbuk, South Korea |
| Jang Hye-ri | Ji Seok-hwan | Gyeonggi, South Korea |
| Jang Yeong-seo | Jeong Byeong-jin | Seoul, South Korea |
| Helena Jauron | Rene Morissette | Estrie, Quebec |
| Jana Jelínková | Ondřej Mihola | Prague, Czech Republic |
| Mona Jensen | Morten Berger | Hvidovre, Denmark |
| Jeong Jae-hee | Yang Woo-jin | Gyeonggi, South Korea |
| Jeong Min-jae | Kim Hyo-jun | Gyeongbuk, South Korea |
| Kaitlin Jewer | Robert Currie | Toronto, Ontario |
| Megan Johnson | Ryan Fenrich | Okotoks, Alberta |
| Angie Jones | Stephen Imes | (United States) Bowling Green, Ohio |
| Jennifer Jones | Brent Laing | Barrie, Ontario |
| Eszter Juhász | Markku Uusipaavalniemi | Hyvinkää, Finland |
| Mintautė Jurkutė | Paulius Rymeikis | Vilnius, Lithuania |
| Sherry Just | Ryan Deis | Prince Albert, Saskatchewan |
| Malika Kadlyzhanova | Artyom Supanev | Almaty, Kazakhstan |
| Marie Kaldvee | Harri Lill | Tallinn, Estonia |
| Vera Kalocsai | Otto Kalocsay | Budapest, Hungary |
| Kang Bo-bae | Kim Min-sang | Gyeonggi, South Korea |
| Kang Min-hyo | Choi Won-yeong | Gyeongbuk, South Korea |
| Kang Su-yeon | Kim Dae-seok | Jeonbuk, South Korea |
| Lena Kapp | Marc Muskatewitz | Füssen, Germany |
| Aleksandra Kardapoltseva | Petr Kuznetsov | Dmitrov, Russia |
| Oona Kauste | Aku Kauste | Hyvinkää, Finland |
| Mallory Kean | Mark Kean | Woodstock, Ontario |
| Jana Kelemen | Kevin MacTavish | Oakville, Ontario |
| Kelcee Kennedy | David Baum | Saskatoon, Saskatchewan |
| Kya Kennedy | Landon Field | Saskatoon, Saskatchewan |
| Casey Kidd | Brad Kidd | Bridgenorth, Ontario |
| Kim Do-hye | Moon Seong-won | Jeonbuk, South Korea |
| Kim Eun-bee | Lee Ye-jun | Gangwon, South Korea |
| Kim Hae-jeong | Kim Min-je | Gyeongbuk, South Korea |
| Kim Hye-rin | Seong Yu-jin | Gangwon, South Korea |
| Kim Ji-hyeon | Park Seong-min | Gyeongbuk, South Korea |
| Kim Ji-su | Jeong Hyeon-wuk | Gyeonggi, South Korea |
| Kim Ji-yoon | Moon Si-woo | Gyeonggi, South Korea |
| Kim Min-hee | Kim Chan-guk | Daejeon, South Korea |
| Kim Min-ji | Lee Ki-jeong | Gangwon, South Korea |
| Kim Min-seo | Lee Tae-hoon | Cheongju, South Korea |
| Kim Su-bin | Lim Byeong-hyeon | Cheongju, South Korea |
| Kim Su-hyeon | Pyo Jeong-min | Gyeongbuk, South Korea |
| Kim Su-ji | Kim Jeong-min | Gyeonggi, South Korea |
| Kim Su-jin | Oh Seung-hoon | Gangwon, South Korea |
| Kim Sur-yeong | Kwon Jun-seo | Gyeongbuk, South Korea |
| Kim Ye-hyeon | Kim Seung-min | Gyeonggi, South Korea |
| Karly King-Simpson | Connor Croteau | Victoria / Campbell River, British Columbia |
| Chaelynn Kitz | Brayden Stewart | Saskatoon, Saskatchewan |
| Madison Kleiter | Rylan Kleiter | Saskatoon, Saskatchewan |
| Tori Koana | Go Aoki | Yamanashi, Japan |
| Maria Komarova | Daniil Goriachev | Moscow, Russia |
| Micayla Kooistra | Gerry Geurts | Okotoks, Alberta / London, Ontario |
| Jorja Kopytko | Calder Fadden | Vernon, British Columbia |
| Kassidy Kowalchuk | Richard Kleibrink | Okotoks, Alberta |
| Anastasia Krivosheeva | Valentin Andreev | Krasnoyarsk, Russia |
| Adrienne Kruzer | Brett Kubricht | (United States) Charlotte, North Carolina |
| Akgul Kumar | Azizbek Nadirbayev | Almaty, Kazakhstan |
| Julia Kuznetsova | Vladislav Velichko | Krasnoyarsk, Russia |
| Alyssa Kyllo | Darren Richards | Vernon, British Columbia |
| Jasmin Lander | Henrik Holtermann | Hvidovre, Denmark |
| Jessica Lang | Matt Lang | Regina, Saskatchewan |
| Marie-Eve Langevin | Jean Langevin | Sherbrooke, Quebec |
| Audrey Laplante | Jasmin Gibeau | Thurso, Quebec |
| Isabelle Lapointe | Marc Cote | Saguenay, Quebec |
| Laurie-Anne Leclerc | Brandan Guillemette | Quebec, Quebec |
| Lee Eun-chae | Kim Hong-geon | Gyeonggi, South Korea |
| Lee Eun-chae | Kim Jin-hun | Gyeongbuk, South Korea |
| Lee Ga-hee | Baek Jong-cheol | Seoul, South Korea |
| Lee Ji-yeong | Seo Seung-ho | Jeonbuk, South Korea |
| Lee Su-hyeon | Choi Chi-won | Gyeonggi, South Korea |
| Lee Yu-seon | Park Seo-yun | Gyeonggi, South Korea |
| Lee Yun-ji | Heo Su | Cheongju, South Korea |
| Arina Leontieva | Petr Triandafilidi | Vladivostok, Russia |
| Marie-Pier Lequin | Simon Morissette | Sherbrooke, Quebec |
| Jenny Levy | Benjamin Levy | (United States) Detroit, Michigan |
| Lim Su-jin | Kwak Byeong-hun | Incheon, South Korea |
| Lim Ye-jin | Lee Don-gin | Busan, South Korea |
| Iluta Linde | Jānis Rudzītis | Riga, Latvia |
| Catherine Liscumb | Chris Liscumb | Ilderton, Ontario |
| Kendra Lister | Daniel Lister | Fredericton, New Brunswick |
| Mikaylah Lyburn | William Lyburn | Winnipeg, Manitoba |
| Daisy-Scarlett MacCallum | Brian Terwedo | (United States) Minneapolis, Minnesota |
| Lauren MacFadyen | Alex MacFadyen | Charlottetown, Prince Edward Island |
| Triin Madisson | Karl Kukner | Tallinn, Estonia |
| Slávka Makovníková | Juraj Gallo | Bratislava, Slovakia |
| Emma Malfara | Robert Wright | Toronto, Ontario |
| Karine Marchand | Louis-François Brassard | Quebec, Quebec |
| Abby Marks | Marc Kennedy | Edmonton, Alberta |
| Nancy Martin | Tyrel Griffith | Saskatoon, Saskatchewan / Kelowna, British Columbia |
| Chiaki Matsumura | Yasumasa Tanida | Nagano / Hokkaido, Japan |
| Daniela Matulová | Juraj Gallo | Bratislava, Slovakia |
| Jana Matulová | Milan Moravčík | Bratislava, Slovakia |
| Anne Maynard | Matt Sussman | (United States) Toledo, Ohio |
| Taylor McDonald | Geoff Walker | Edmonton, Alberta |
| Veronica McGinn | Jared McGinn | Fredericton, New Brunswick |
| Katie McKenzie | Thomas Dunlop | Dauphin, Manitoba |
| Joyce McLaren | Kevin Mechenbier | (United States) Denver, Colorado |
| Keira McLaughlin | Tanner Horgan | Sudbury, Ontario |
| Marin McLeod | Zach Eldridge | Fredericton, New Brunswick |
| Christine McMakin | Riley Fenson | (United States) Bemidji, Minnesota |
| Kelsey Meger | Andrew Peck | Winnipeg, Manitoba |
| Eirin Mesloe | Wilhelm Næss | Lillehammer, Norway |
| Gunta Millere | Aivars Purmalis | Riga, Latvia |
| Anastasia Mischenko | Alexey Tuzov | Dmitrov, Russia |
| Emma Miskew | Ryan Fry | Ottawa, Ontario |
| Becky Moncur | Scott Moncur | Canmore, Alberta |
| Amber Montegomery | Daniel Mutlow | Weyburn, Saskatchewan |
| Clare Moores | Lance Wheeler | (United States) Golden, Colorado |
| Caroline Morissette | Louis Morissette | Saguenay, Quebec |
| Daria Morozova | Oleg Krasikov | Moscow, Russia |
| Rebecca Morrison | Robin Brydone | Stirling, Scotland |
| Anastasia Moskaleva | Alexander Eremin | Moscow, Russia |
| Eve Muirhead | Bobby Lammie | Stirling, Scotland |
| Sydney Mullaney | Chase Sinnett | (United States) Wayland, Massachusetts |
| Heather Munn | Nicholas Munn | Saint John, New Brunswick |
| Anna Munroe | Thierry Fournier | Quebec, Quebec |
| Alevtina Muravieva | Andrey Suvorov | Saint Petersburg, Russia |
| Alyssa Nedohin | Jaxon Hiebert | Sherwood Park, Alberta |
| Alyssa Nedohin | David Nedohin | Sherwood Park, Alberta |
| Laura Neil | Scott McDonald | St. Thomas, Ontario |
| Kym Neutel | Jason Larence | Penticton, British Columbia |
| Veronika Neznalová | Matěj Neznal | Prague, Czech Republic |
| Brenda Nicholls | Dan deWaard | Quebec, Quebec |
| Kirstin Nickel | Gabriel Nickel | (United States) Robbinsdale, Minnesota |
| Ann Nilsson | Bengt Nilsson | Gothenburg, Sweden |
| Junko Nishimuro | Saturo Tsukamoto | Yamanashi, Japan |
| Selena Njegovan | Reid Carruthers | Winnipeg, Manitoba |
| Ewa Nogły | Konrad Stych | Łódź, Poland |
| Synnove Nordstad | Fred Kristian Norstad | Hedmarken, Norway |
| Camilla Noréen | Simon Granbom | Stockholm, Sweden |
| Tova Noréen | Per Noréen | Gävle, Sweden |
| Ksenia Novikova | German Doronin | Dmitrov, Russia |
| Pamela Nugent | Kevin LeCouffe | Montreal, Quebec |
| Anne O'Hara | Coleman Thurston | (United States) Fairbanks, Alaska |
| Constanze Ocker | Uli Kapp | Kitzbühel, Austria / Füssen, Germany |
| Oh Eun-jin | Hwang Hyeon-jun | Daejeon, South Korea |
| Oh Ji-hyeon | Choi Ah-won | Gyeongbuk, South Korea |
| Lucia Orokocká | Pavol Pitoňák | Bratislava, Slovakia |
| Lisianne Ouellet | Guillaume Rousseau | Rivière-du-Loup, Quebec |
| Dorottya Palancsa | Zsolt Kiss | Budapest, Hungary |
| Paige Papley | David Nedohin | Edmonton, Alberta |
| Paige Papley | Evan van Amsterdam | Edmonton, Alberta |
| Lisa Parent | Tyler Powell | Edmonton, Alberta |
| Park Jeong-hwa | Seo Min-guk | Gyeonggi, South Korea |
| Park Seo-jin | Moon Hyeon | Cheongju, South Korea |
| Park Yu-bin | Kwon Dong-keun | Gyeonggi, South Korea |
| Tyler Parmiter | Ronnie Burgess | Fredericton, New Brunswick |
| Zuzana Paulová | Tomáš Paul | Prague, Czech Republic |
| Kennedy Pederson | Gavin Fleck | Outlook, Saskatchewan |
| Monique Penney | Jon Penney | (United States) Cincinnati, Ohio |
| Jenny Perret | Martin Rios | Glarus, Switzerland |
| Roxane Perron | Julien Tremblay | Quebec City, Quebec |
| Vicky Persinger | Chris Plys | (United States) Fairbanks, Alaska / Chaska, Minnesota |
| Jocelyn Peterman | Brett Gallant | Winnipeg, Manitoba / St. John's, Newfoundland and Labrador |
| Tabitha Peterson | Joe Polo | (United States) Chaska, Minnesota |
| Tara Peterson | Kroy Nernberger | (United States) Chaska, Minnesota |
| Anne Pifer | Neil Pifer | (United States) Charlotte, North Carolina |
| Mattea Pittman | Cody Smith | Okotoks, Alberta |
| Cyntia Plouffe | Stéphane Paquette | Outaouais, Quebec |
| Ann Podoll | Nathan Parry | (United States) Fargo, North Dakota |
| Helene Poisson | René Dubois | Saguenay, Quebec |
| Jenna Pomedli | Brayden Heistad | Saskatoon, Saskatchewan |
| Kailee Popowich | James Owen | Saskatoon, Saskatchewan |
| Emily Potter | Brian Shimko | (United States) Cincinnati, Ohio |
| Andreja Prislan | Marko Bilčar | Ljubljana, Slovenia |
| Zanda Priste-Vonda | Jānis Vonda | Riga, Latvia |
| Ashley Quick | Mike Armstrong | Saskatoon, Saskatchewan |
| Estefana Quintero | Ismael Abreu | Mexico City, Mexico |
| Maia Ramsfjell | Magnus Ramsfjell | Trondheim, Norway |
| Claire Randell | Nicholas Lemieux | St. Catharines, Ontario |
| Amelie Ratte | Denis Guy | Clermont, Quebec |
| Dace Regža | Ansis Regža | Riga, Latvia |
| Evita Regža | Aleksandrs Baranovskis | Riga, Latvia |
| Heidi Reimer | Matt Reimer | Brandon, Manitoba |
| Marina Reimova | Vyacheslav Maloivan | Almaty, Kazakhstan |
| Melissa Remeshylo | Dylan Derksen | Martensville, Saskatchewan |
| Kim Rhyme | Jason Smith | (United States) Saint Paul, Minnesota |
| Brette Richards | Mark Taylor | British Columbia |
| Marcia Richardson | Brendan Acorn | Ottawa, Ontario |
| Emily Riley | Jesse Mullen | Saguenay, Quebec |
| Layton Risto | Jeff Baggaley | St. Catharines, Ontario |
| Carrie Robertson | Alex Robertson | Stratford, Ontario |
| Kelsey Rocque | Braden Calvert | Edmonton, Alberta / Winnipeg, Manitoba |
| Gina Rogers | Tom Rogers | (United States) Charlotte, North Carolina |
| Harley Rohrbacher | Nicholas Visnich | (United States) Pittsburgh, Pennsylvania |
| Martine Rønning | Mathias Brænden | Lillehammer, Norway |
| Dany Roy | Bruno Sonier | Sherbrooke, Quebec |
| Ieva Rudzīte | Artis Zentelis | Riga, Latvia |
| Hannah Rugg | Andy Lloyd | Moose Jaw, Saskatchewan |
| Daniela Rupp | Kevin Wunderlin | Zug, Switzerland |
| Zuzanna Rybicka | Bartosz Dzikowski | Łódź, Poland |
| Akvilė Rykove | Konstantin Rykov | Vilnius, Lithuania |
| Ryu Yeon-seung | Kim Sang-wan | Jeonbuk, South Korea |
| Kadriana Sahaidak | Colton Lott | Winnipeg Beach, Manitoba |
| Dayanna Sakysh | Erkki Lill | Tallinn, Estonia |
| Anna Samoylik | Mikhail Vaskov | Krasnoyarsk, Russia |
| Riley Sandham | Brendan Craig | Guelph, Ontario |
| Sophie Sanscartier | Maxandre Caron | Montreal, Quebec |
| Susanna Säntti | Iikko Säntti | Hyvinkää, Finland |
| Zarina Sarsekeyeva | Dastan Zhanibekov | Almaty, Kazakhstan |
| Jennifer Sashkiw | Shane Coutis | Banff, Alberta |
| Bobbie Sauder | Brendan Bottcher | Spruce Grove, Alberta |
| Sanita Saulgrieze | Jānis Rēdlihs | Riga, Latvia |
| Mathilde Sauvageau | Leandre Girard | Quebec, Quebec |
| Julie Savard | Bernard Auchu | Clermont, Quebec |
| Raechel Schlechter | Chris Haichert | Swift Current, Saskatchewan |
| Katja Schlegel | Sebastian Keiser | Zug, Switzerland |
| Cindy Schmid | Martin Risi | Switzerland |
| Danielle Schmiemann | Jason Ginter | Edmonton, Alberta |
| Pia-Lisa Schöll | Klaudius Harsch | Füssen / Oberstdorf, Germany |
| Kim Schwaerzle | Erik Colwell | Vernon, British Columbia |
| Emily Schweitzer | Blake Hagberg | (United States) Saint Paul, Minnesota |
| Zarina Seidakhankyzy | Damir Aldiyar | Almaty, Kazakhstan |
| Daria Semenova | Vasiliy Telezhkin | Yaroslav, Russia |
| Seol Ye-eun | Lee Jun-hyung | Gyeonggi, South Korea |
| Seol Ye-ji | Park Se-won | Gyeonggi, South Korea |
| Seema Shah | P. N. Raju | Hyderabad, India |
| Anne Shibuya | Scott McMullan | São Paulo, Brazil |
| Shim Yu-jeong | Kwon Oh-woo | Cheongju, South Korea |
| Shin Eun-ji | Park Gyeong-ho | Cheongju, South Korea |
| Shin Eun-jin | Kim Hyeong-wu | Jeonbuk, South Korea |
| Shin Ga-yeong | Park Jun-ha | Jeonbuk, South Korea |
| Jessica Shipmaker | Mike Aprile | Mississauga, Ontario |
| Krista Shortridge | Brady Gillies | Lethbridge, Alberta |
| Christa Shulman | Rodney Ouellette | Rocky Mountain House, Alberta |
| Anna Sidorova | Matthias Perret | Moscow, Russia |
| Anna Sidorova | Alexey Timofeev | Moscow, Russia |
| Jamie Sinclair | Rich Ruohonen | (United States) Chaska, Minnesota |
| Sophie Sinclair | Ross Whyte | Stirling, Scotland |
| Emma Sjödin | Johannes Patz | Karlstad, Sweden |
| Kristin Skaslien | Magnus Nedregotten | Oslo, Norway |
| Kayla Skrlik | Gregg Hamilton | Calgary, Alberta |
| Torill Agnethe Sletli | Terje Skogvold | Hedmarken, Norway |
| Amanda Sluchinski | Ryan Parent | Edmonton, Alberta |
| Amanda Smith | Alan Shaw | (United States) Charlotte, North Carolina |
| Cynthia Smith | D. J. Johnson | (United States) Denver, Colorado |
| Megan Smith | Matthew Hall | Kitchener, Ontario |
| Mili Smith | Duncan McFadzean | Stirling, Scotland |
| Song Yu-jin | Kang Geon | Jeonbuk, South Korea |
| Tracy Sorenson | Cameron Sorenson | (United States) Charlotte, North Carolina |
| Jill Springer | Garret Springer | Regina, Saskatchewan |
| Laurie St-Georges | Félix Asselin | Laval, Quebec |
| Crystal Stasik | Brady Gould | (United States) Charlotte, North Carolina |
| Daria Steksova | Alexey Kulikov | Moscow, Russia |
| Maureen Stolt | Peter Stolt | (United States) Plymouth, Minnesota |
| Taylor Stremick | Logan Ede | Martensville, Saskatchewan |
| Selena Sturmay | Karsten Sturmay | Edmonton, Alberta |
| Nina Summerova | Jan Horacek | Bratislava, Slovakia |
| Jessie Sutherland | Simon-Olivier Hebert | Montreal, Quebec |
| Val Sweeting | Marc Kennedy | Lottie Lake / St. Albert, Alberta |
| Ildikó Szekeres | György Nagy | Budapest, Hungary |
| Marta Szeliga-Frynia | Paweł Frynia | Łódź, Poland |
| Tomoko Takeda | Naomasa Takeda | Nayoro, Japan |
| Diana Targyn | Bagdat Akkazanov | Almaty, Kazakhstan |
| Tatsiana Tarsunova | Vitali Burmistrau | Minsk, Belarus |
| Joanne Tarvit | Brodie Tarvit | St. Thomas, Ontario |
| Merey Tastemir | Mohammed Saleh | Kabul, Afghanistan |
| Savanna Taylor | Caden Snow | Saskatoon, Saskatchewan |
| Ekaterina Telnova | Artem Puzanov | Moscow, Russia |
| Erin Tester | Andrew Berg | London, Ontario |
| Erin Titkai | Eric Fenech | Toronto, Ontario |
| Vanessa Tonoli | Alexander Magan | Zoetermeer, Netherlands |
| Brittany Tran | Aaron Sluchinski | Calgary, Alberta |
| Kelly Tremblay | Pierre Lanoue | Montreal, Quebec |
| Sissel Troan | Gjermund Troan | Hedmarken, Norway |
| Elizaveta Trukhina | Nikolay Lysakov | Irkutsk, Russia |
| Maria Tsebriy | Timofey Nasonov | Moscow, Russia |
| Kim Tuck | Wayne Tuck Jr. | Strathroy, Ontario |
| Brennin Turner | Nicolas Oake | Edmonton, Alberta |
| Um Min-ji | Nam Yun-ho | Jeonbuk, South Korea |
| Oihane Unanue | Mikel Unanue | San Sebastián, Spain |
| Noémie Verreault | Remi Savard | Saguenay, Quebec |
| Lara von Bueren | Marco Klaiber | Dübendorf, Switzerland |
| Adela Walczak | Andrzej Augustyniak | Łódź, Poland |
| Laura Walker | Kirk Muyres | Edmonton, Alberta / Regina, Saskatchewan |
| Monica Walker | Alex Leichter | (United States) Boston, Massachusetts |
| Meghan Walter | Brett Walter | Winnipeg, Manitoba |
| Dessiny Wang | Steve Liang | St. Catharines, Ontario |
| Sarah Wark | Brennan Wark | Thunder Bay, Ontario |
| Maddy Warriner | Charlie Richard | Woodstock, Ontario |
| Lauren Wasylkiw | Shane Konings | Unionville, Ontario |
| Teresa Waterfield | Ryder Helmeczi | Saskatoon, Saskatchewan |
| Kristy Watling | Hayden Forrester | Winnipeg, Manitoba |
| Ashley Waye | Rob Retchless | Toronto, Ontario |
| Lisa Weagle | John Epping | Ottawa / Toronto, Ontario |
| BriAnna Weldon | Sean Franey | (United States) Denver, Colorado |
| Nicole Westlund Stewart | Tyler Stewart | Thunder Bay, Ontario |
| Therese Westman | Robin Ahlberg | Stockholm, Sweden |
| Agata Wiaderna | Patryk Paradowski | Łódź, Poland |
| Nathalie Wiksten | Kasper Wiksten | Hvidovre, Denmark |
| Stephanie Wild | Thomas Kupper | Baden, Switzerland |
| Sarah Wilkes | Brad Thiessen | Edmonton, Alberta |
| Lyndsey Wilson | Scott Dow | Palmerston, Ontario |
| Katrine Wolla | Kjell Bjørseth | Hedmarken, Norway |
| Becca Wood | Shawn Banyai | (United States) Denver, Colorado |
| Isabella Wranå | Rasmus Wranå | Stockholm, Sweden |
| Vicky Wright | Grant Hardie | Stirling, Scotland |
| Rhonda Wynn | Ron Russell | British Columbia |
| Olivia Wynter | Cameron Sallaj | Moncton, New Brunswick |
| Jessica Wytrychowski | Michael Dumont | Calgary, Alberta |
| Samantha Yachiw | Jordan Raymond | Saskatoon, Saskatchewan |
| Kateryna Yakymets | Mykhailo Pleskanka | Kyiv, Ukraine |
| Yang Seung-hee | Lee Jun-hwa | Gyeongbuk, South Korea |
| Yang Tae-i | Lee Ki-bok | Gangwon, South Korea |
| Eilidh Yeats | Blair Haswell | Stirling, Scotland |
| Dilşat Yıldız | Uğurcan Karagöz | Erzurum, Turkey |
| Yurika Yoshida | Yuta Matsumura | Hokkaido, Japan |
| Lesley Young | Duncan Menzies | Stirling, Scotland |
| Julie Zelingrová | Vít Chabičovský | Prague, Czech Republic |
| Jessica Zheng | Victor Pietrangelo | Niagara Falls, Ontario |
| Ayazhan Zhumabek | Adil Zhumagozha | Almaty, Kazakhstan |
