= 1993 Canadian Mixed Curling Championship =

- Host city: Swift Current, Saskatchewan
- Dates: March 20–27, 1993
- Winner: Nova Scotia
- Curling club: Halifax Curling Club, Halifax
- Skip: Scott Saunders
- Third: Colleen Jones
- Second: Tom Fetterly
- Lead: Helen Radford
- Finalist: Alberta

The 1993 Canadian Mixed Curling Championship was held March 20-27 in Swift Current, Saskatchewan.

Nova Scotia, skipped by Scott Saunders of Halifax defeated Alberta, skipped by Terry Meek of Calgary, 6–4 in the final. Nova Scotia took control of the game in the fourth end when Meek missed a freeze attempt on shot rock, which was followed up by Saunders drawing for three, giving the Bluenosers a 4–1 lead.

It was the first Canadian Mixed title for Nova Scotia in 29 years. Saunders' team included wife Colleen Jones, and front end Tom Fetterly and Helen Radford. Jones was pregnant with their son Luke at the time.

== Standings ==
Final standings

Key
Teams to Playoffs

Province	Skip	Wins	Losses
Nova Scotia	Scott Saunders	8	3
Alberta	Terry Meek	7	4
Northern Ontario	Scott Patterson	7	4
Yukon/Northwest Territories	Chad Cowan	6	5
Manitoba	Dale Duguid	6	5
Saskatchewan	Troy Robinson	6	5
Ontario	Dave Merklinger	5	6
New Brunswick	Grant Odishaw	5	6
Newfoundland	Gary Oke	5	6
British Columbia	Steve Streifel	4	7
Prince Edward Island	John Likely	4	7
Quebec	Guy Hemmings	3	8

== Playoffs ==
Semifinal		Final
		Nova Scotia	6
Alberta	8	Alberta	4
Northern Ontario	2

=== Semifinal ===
March 26, 9:00pm CST

Team	1	2	3	4	5	6	7	8	9	10	Final
Alberta (Meek)	0	3	0	2	0	0	3	X	X	X	8
Northern Ontario (Patterson)	0	0	1	0	1	0	0	X	X	X	2

=== Final ===
March 27, 2:00pm CST

Team	1	2	3	4	5	6	7	8	9	10	Final
Alberta (Meek)	0	0	1	0	1	0	0	0	2	X	4
Nova Scotia (Saunders)	1	0	0	3	0	1	0	1	0	X	6
