= Terry Meek =

Canadian curler

- Curler
- Born: November 3, 1962 (age 64); Regina, Saskatchewan, Canada

Team
- Curling club: Calgary CC, Calgary, AB
- Skip: Terry Meek
- Third: Ralph Brust
- Second: Greg Northcott
- Lead: Peter Innes

Curling career
- Brier: 1 (2009)
- World Championship: 1 (2009)
Medal record
Men's curling
Representing Canada
World Curling Championships
Silver medal – second place	2009 Moncton
Representing Alberta
Tim Hortons Brier
Gold medal – first place	2009 Calgary	Men's

Terry Meek (born November 3, 1962, in Regina, Saskatchewan) is a Canadian curler from Calgary, Alberta. He is a former world silver medalist and is the current coaching consultant of the Cheryl Bernard rink (and is also her common law partner). He also skips his team on the World Curling Tour.

== Career ==
Meek played in his first provincial championship in 1987. In 1993, he skipped his mixed team to a provincial championship, and lost the final of the 1993 Canadian Mixed Curling Championship. Since then, Meek has played in 5 more (1994, 1999, 2003, 2008, 2011) provincial men's championships, but has yet to win the event. In 2009, he was invited to be the alternate on the Kevin Martin team, which won the 2009 Tim Hortons Brier and won a silver medal at the 2009 World Men's Curling Championship. Meek played in two games at the 2009 Worlds.

== Personal life ==
Outside of curling, Meek was the founder of Thunder Energy, Ember Resources, Point Loma Resources, which were public listed oil, gas exploration and production companies. Also President and CEO of multiple Private energy companies. He has two sons, Evan Pawlak and Connor Meek.
