= Chemin de fer de l'Outaouais =

Railroad in Quebec, Canada

Overview
- Headquarters: Gatineau, Quebec
- Reporting mark: CCFO
- Locale: Between Gatineau and Wakefield, Quebec
- Dates of operation: 2008 –
- Predecessor: Canadian Pacific Railway (1904 - 1992); Hull–Chelsea–Wakefield Railway (1992 - 2008)

Technical
- Track gauge: 1,435 mm (4 ft 8 1/2 in) standard gauge

Chemin de fer de l'Outaouais (CFO), also known as the Compagnie de chemin de fer de l'Outaouais (CCFO), owns the Hull–Chelsea–Wakefield Railway which the city of Gatineau to Wakefield, in the province of Quebec. Before 1986 the track extended to Maniwaki.

The company is owned by the cities of Gatineau, Chelsea, and La Pêche.

== See also ==
- Hull–Chelsea–Wakefield Railway
- 1904 in rail transport
- Quebec Gatineau Railway
