= Malak Karsh =

Canadian photographer (1915–2001)

Malak Karsh OC
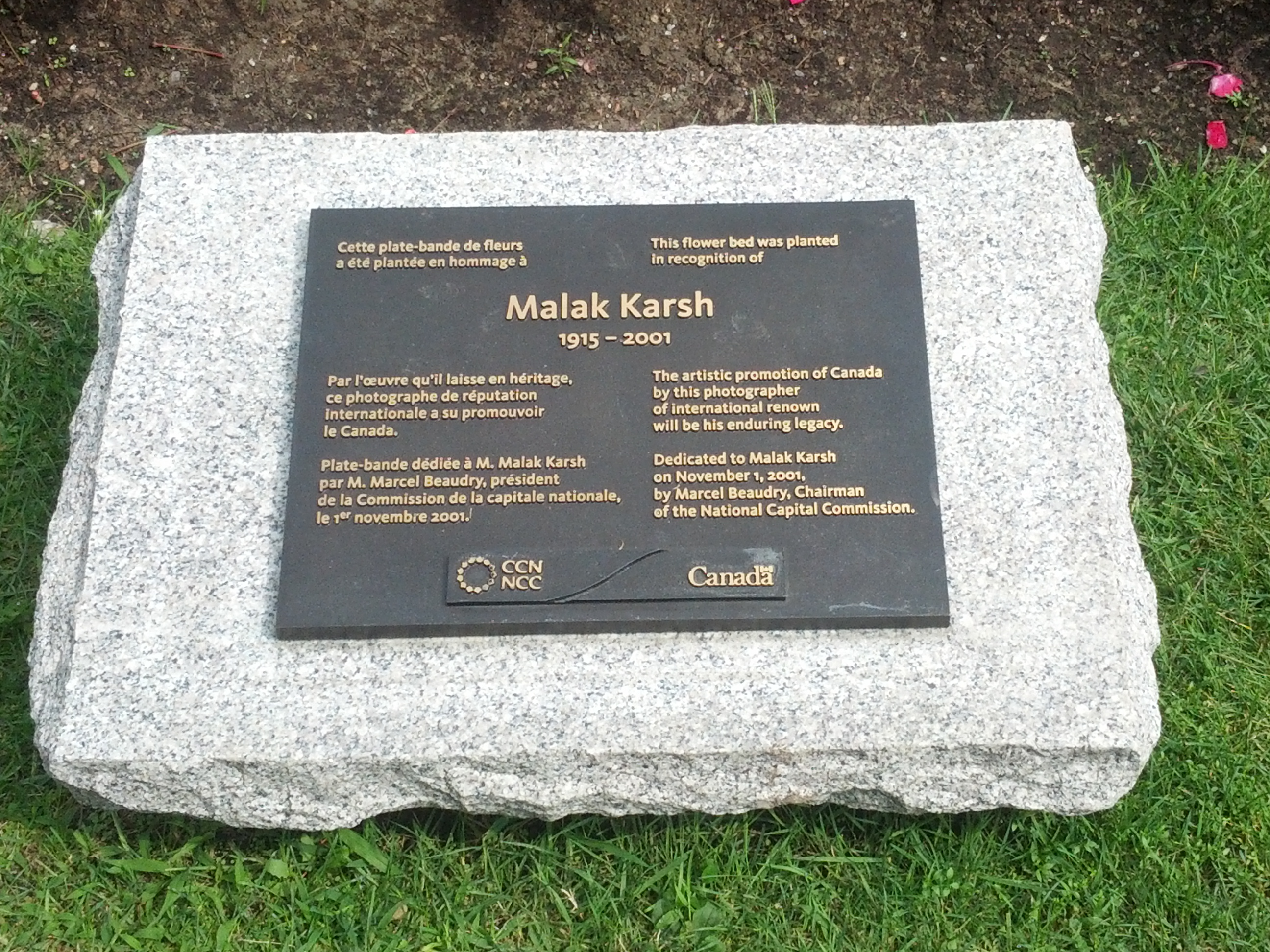
- Born: March 1, 1915; Mardin, Ottoman Empire
- Died: November 8, 2001 (aged 86); Ottawa, Ontario, Canada
- Known for: Photographer
- Notable work: Picture of the floating logs on the Ottawa River
- Awards: Order of Canada

Malak Karsh (March 1, 1915 – November 8, 2001) was a Canadian photographer known for his photographs of Canada and the Ottawa region.

== Career ==
Born in Mardin, Ottoman Empire, a few months before the Armenian genocide, he emigrated to Canada in 1937 and began a career in photography with the help of his brother Yousuf Karsh and his uncle George Nakash, both accomplished photographers. Malak Karsh was one of Canada's most renowned photographers. He had many photographic exhibitions including exhibitions at the National Arts Centre, the Museums of Nature and History, the Ottawa Congress Centre, in Holland and other countries. His awards included the Order of Canada, the Keys to the City of Ottawa, the Whitton Award, the Professional Photographers of Canada's award as a Master of the Photographs Arts, the CAPIC Lifetime Achievement Award, Photographer of the Year, and the National Film Board of Canada's gold medal.

In 1952 Malak's fascination with Canada's Capital and the tulips that graced the city following Queen Juliana's gift of 100,000 tulip bulbs inspired Malak to conceive of an annual tulip festival in Ottawa and working with the Ottawa Board of Trade the Canadian Tulip Festival was established in 1952. According to Ottawa mayor Bob Chiarelli, "He helped put Ottawa on the map. Probably the biggest and best brand for Ottawa was his tulips." Malak was the honorary president of the festival at the time of his death.

In 1963, he took a picture of the floating logs on the Ottawa River, called Paper and Politics, which was put on the back of the 1969–1979 Scenes of Canada series Canadian $1 bill.

In 1996, he was made an Officer of the Order of Canada. In 2005, the city of Ottawa established the Karsh Award, honouring Ottawa photo-based artists, in honour of Malak and Yousuf Karsh.

Library and Archives Canada have approximately 400,000 photographic images acquired in 1985 and 2015 from Malak's vast library of transparencies, negatives and prints. The images, captured between 1940 and 2001, include many colour photographs of Parliament Hill and the tulip festival, along with landscapes of Canada from sea to sea to sea. Other images feature Canadians at work in agriculture, forestry, industry and the arts.

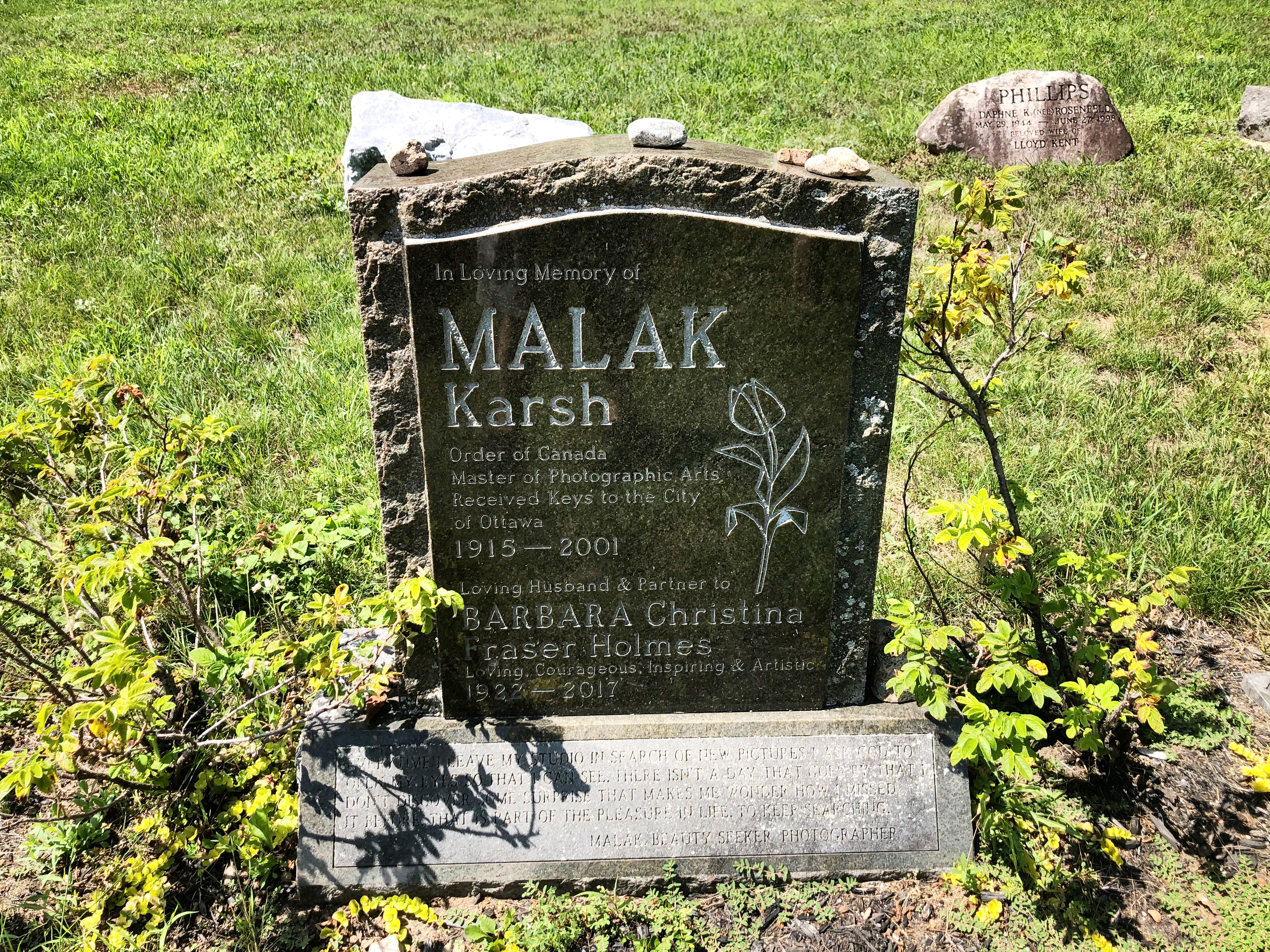
Gravestone of Malak Karsh at Maclaren Cemetery in Wakefield

Malak Karsh died on November 8, 2001, at the age of 86. He is buried in Maclaren Cemetery in Wakefield, Quebec.

== Further readings ==
- Malak. Canada: the land that shapes us. Toronto, Key Porter Books.
- Sawler. Quest for beauty: The photographic journey of Malak of Ottawa. Ottawa, University of Ottawa Press.
