= Laurier LaPierre =

Canadian politician (1929–2012)

The Honourable Laurier LaPierre OC
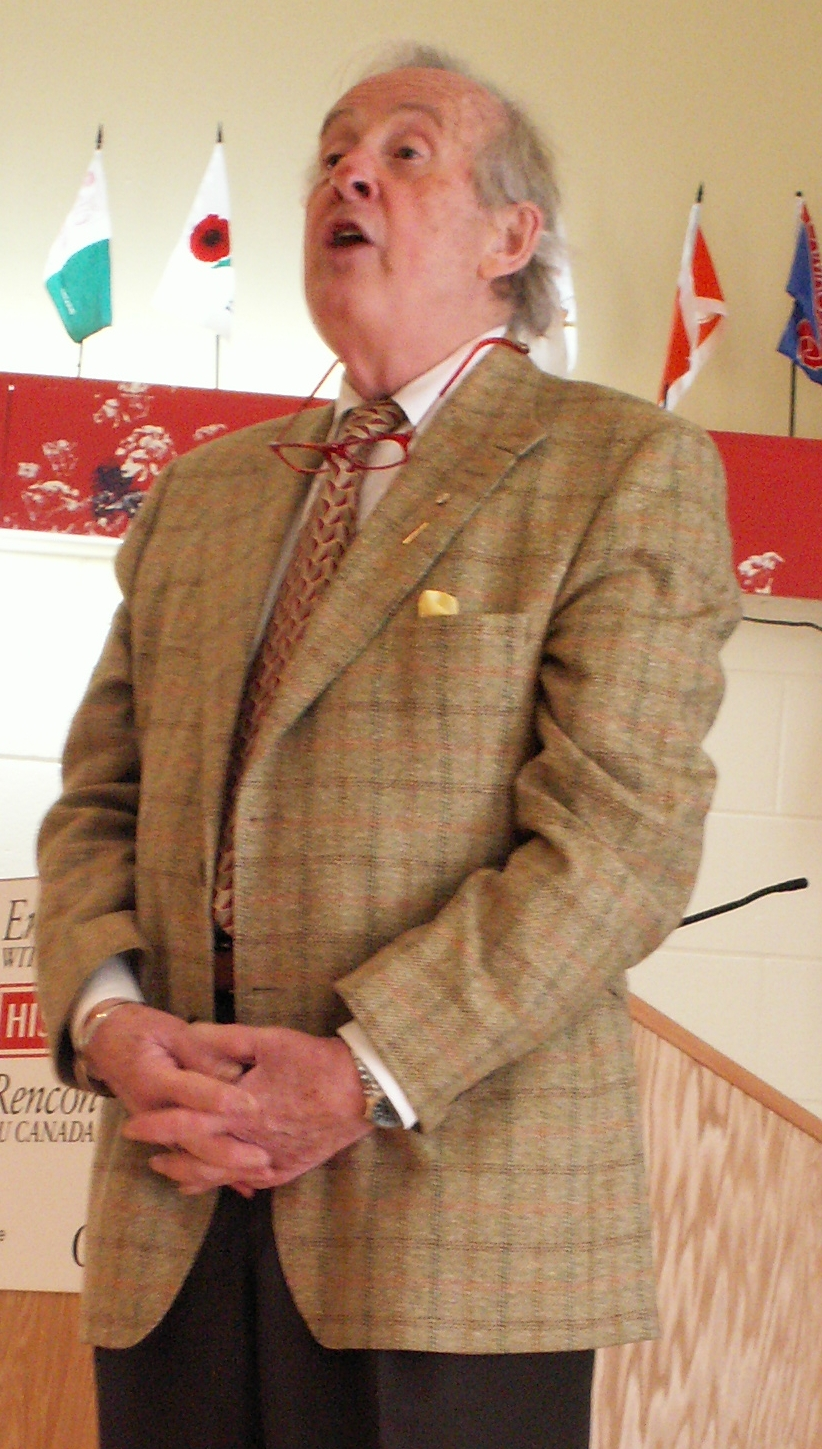
- LaPierre in 2008

Canadian Senator from Ontario
- In office 13 June 2001 – 21 November 2004
- Nominated by: Jean Chrétien

Personal details
- Born: 21 November 1929 Lac-Mégantic, Quebec, Canada
- Died: 16 December 2012 (aged 83) Ottawa, Ontario, Canada
- Party: Liberal; New Democratic (1960s, 1970s)
- Spouse: Paula (Jo) Armstrong (m. 1960; div. 1982)
- Education: St Michael's College, Toronto
- Profession: Author, journalist, historian

Laurier L. LaPierre OC (21 November 1929 – 16 December 2012) was a Canadian Senator, professor, broadcaster, journalist and author. He was a member of the Liberal Party of Canada.

Fluently bilingual, LaPierre was best known for having been co-host with Patrick Watson of the CBC's influential public affairs show This Hour Has Seven Days in the 1960s. After the show's much publicized cancellation, LaPierre moved to politics as a "star candidate" for the New Democratic Party in the 1968 federal election. The party was hoping that he would help achieve an electoral breakthrough in Quebec, but he came second in the riding of Lachine with 19.5% of the vote.

He returned to teaching, broadcasting and writing until his appointment to the Senate in June 2001. As a member of the Liberal caucus, LaPierre was an outspoken supporter of Jean Chrétien against supporters of rival Paul Martin.

== Early life and education ==
LaPierre was born in Lac-Mégantic, Quebec, after which his family moved to Sherbrooke, Quebec, where he completed high school before entering the Paulist Fathers in Baltimore, Maryland, as a novitiate. After four years, he moved to St. Michael's College at the University of Toronto. He received a Bachelor of Arts (1955) from the University of Toronto (St. Michael's College), Master of Arts (1957) and Ph.D. in History (1962) from the University of Toronto.

During those university years he was a part-time teacher at Upper Canada College in Toronto.

He taught history at the College of Christ the King (now King's College), University of Western Ontario (1959–61); Loyola College, Montreal (now part of Concordia University) (1961–63); and McGill University (1963–78). In 1978, he moved to Vancouver to work in television but also taught briefly at Simon Fraser University.

In 1960, he married Paula (Jo) Armstrong and they had two sons: Dominic born 1962 and Thomas born 1965. They were divorced in 1982. He had five grandchildren - Paige, Alex, Georgia, Toby and Owen LaPierre.

He moved to Ottawa in 1990, continued to work in broadcasting and writing, and lived there until his death, in the later years, with his partner Harvey Slack.

He wrote several popular histories including Quebec: A Tale of Love; Sir Wilfrid Laurier and the Romance of Canada; 1759: The Battle for Canada; Québec hier et aujourd'hui; and, The Apprenticeship of Canada, 1876–1914. He also wrote articles for The Financial Post, International Review, Canadian Forum and Encyclopædia Britannica.

He was an activist with EGALE, a lobby group for gay and lesbian rights, after coming out as gay in the late 1980s. He was Canada's first openly gay senator.

== Death ==
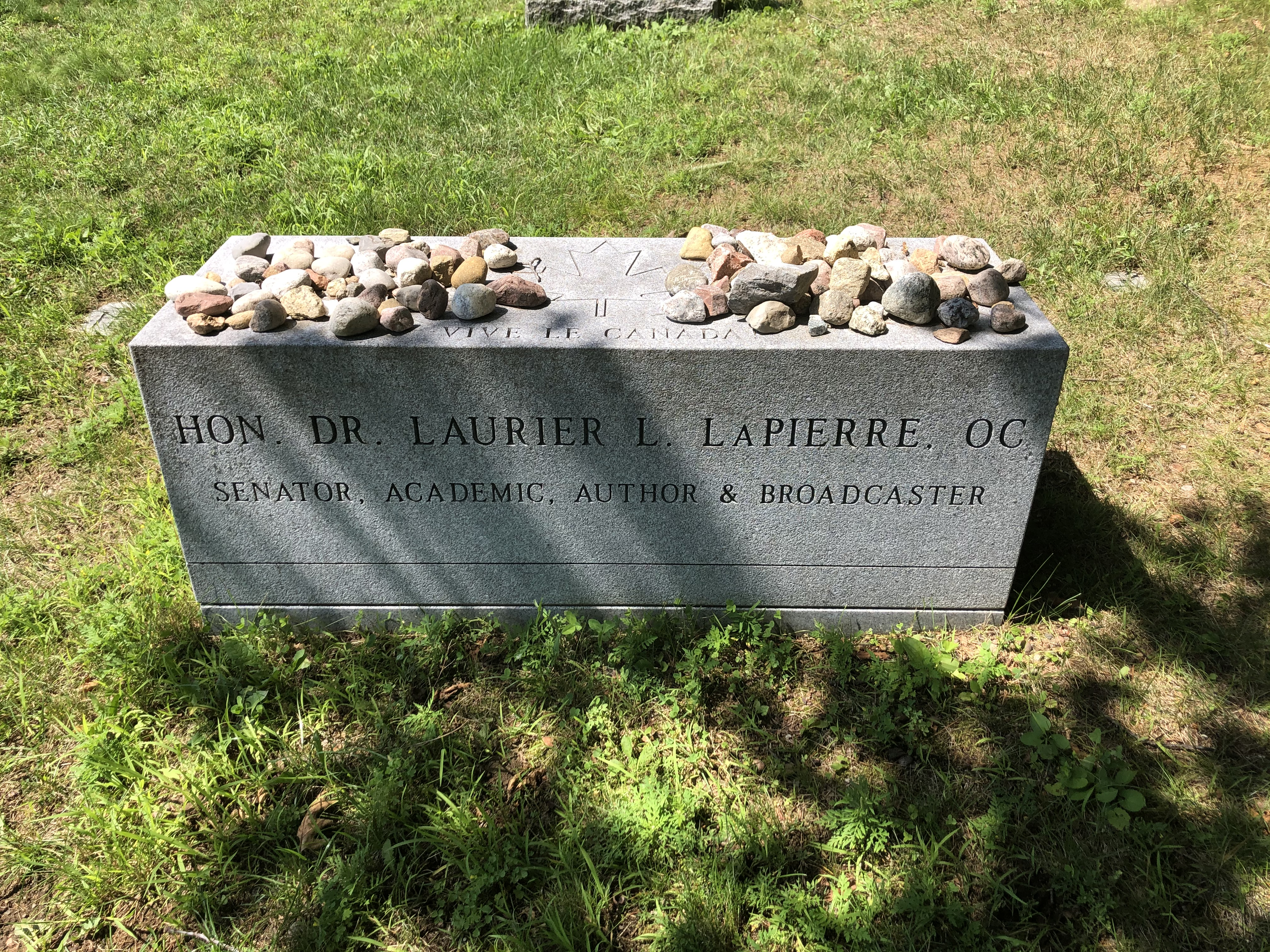
Memorial at Maclaren Cemetery

Appointed an Officer of the Order of Canada in 1994, he was cited as one of Canada's "most valuable political commentators and respected champions of social justice." He died on 16 December 2012, aged 83. LaPierre's ashes were scattered off the coast of British Columbia, as his will requested. Later Harvey Slack financed the construction of a large memorial in LaPierre's name in the small MacLaren Cemetery near Wakefield, Quebec, close to the grave of his ex-wife's uncle Hume Wrong and that of former prime minister Lester B. Pearson. The McGill University Archives holds an extensive collection of his papers, including documents that touch on four aspects of his career: academic, journalistic, political and entrepreneurial.
