= Hull–Chelsea–Wakefield Railway =

Heritage railway in Quebec, Canada

Coordinates: 45.5381°N 75.8077°W

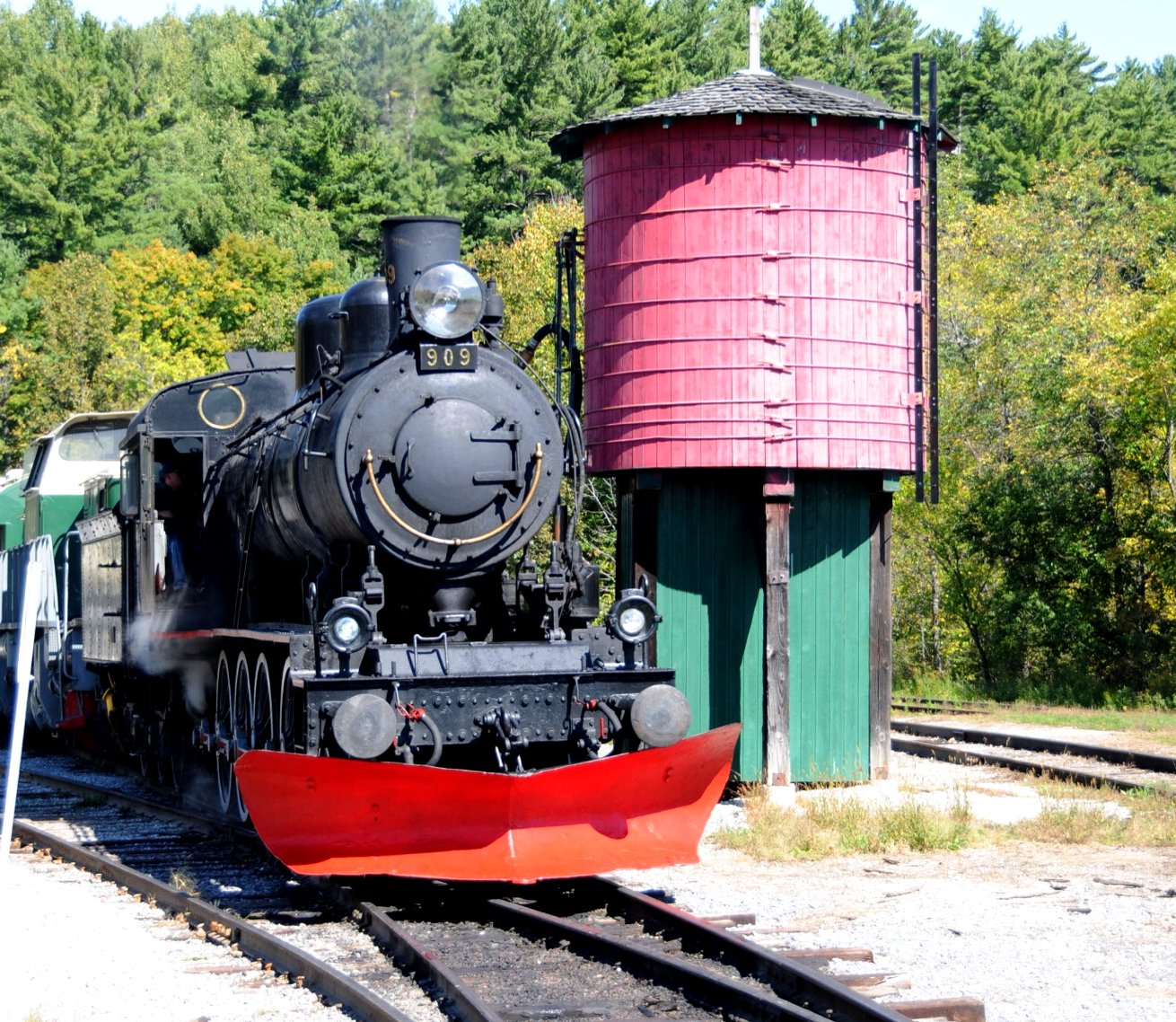
- Wakefield Steam Train, Autumn 2010
- Locale: Between Hull and Wakefield
- Connections: Quebec Gatineau Railway

Commercial operations
- Built by: Ottawa and Gatineau Valley Railroad Company, Ottawa & Gatineau Railway Company and Ottawa Northern & Western between Hull and Maniwaki and leased to Canadian Pacific Railway in 1902
- Original gauge: 4 ft 8 1/2 in (1,435 mm) standard gauge

Preserved operations
- Owned by: Track owned by the Chemin de fer de l'Outaouais, since 2008
- Operated by: Hull–Chelsea–Wakefield Railway
- Reporting mark: HCW (Not Official)
- Stations: 3
- Length: 33 km (20.5 mi)
- Preserved gauge: 1,435 mm (4 ft 8 1/2 in)

Commercial history
- Opened: In stages between 1891 & 1904
- Closed: Abandoned from Wakefield to Maniwaki in 1986 and closed in 1992
- Preserved era: 1992 - 2011

Preservation history
- 1992: The Hull–Chelsea–Wakefield Railway takes over
- 2008: The Chemin de fer de l'Outaouais takes over the ownership of the track
- June 2011: Track washed out/Train ceased operation
- July thru December 2011: Equipment put up for sale / sold

The Hull–Chelsea–Wakefield Railway was a 33 km (20.5 mi) heritage railway in Quebec, Canada, running tourist trains through the scenic Gatineau Hills and beside the Gatineau River between Hull (part of the city of Gatineau) and the tourist town of Wakefield (part of La Pêche municipality) from May to October, using a 1907 Swedish steam locomotive, E2 class number 909, and 1940s-built Swedish passenger cars. On average, the railway attracted about 50 000 tourists and generated revenues of about $8 million for the region.

The line was closed by a 2011 track bed washout and as of 2022 has not re-opened. Cost to repair is estimated above $5 million.

== History ==
The Hull–Chelsea–Wakefield Railway ran on a track that was originally a Canadian Pacific Railway branch line that at one time extended beyond Wakefield to Maniwaki. As of 2008 the track is owned by the Chemin de fer de l'Outaouais.

The railway line had been plagued in recent years with repeated damage to the track bed caused by severe storms. Some sections of the track run through steep terrain and along the bank of the Gatineau River, making it susceptible to such washouts. In 2007, a disagreement erupted between the owner of the steam train line and the municipality of Chelsea and city of Gatineau over the railway safety and maintenance. In July, a rain storm caused damage to some parts of the railway. The owner of the steam train mentioned that without funding from the cities, he would have to cease the operations of the line and sell the steam train. In November, an agreement was made when the province of Quebec and the municipalities involved provided funding for studies into future improvements to the railway. There were also plans for refurbishing the wagons as well as adding a station at the Casino du Lac-Leamy about 2 kilometres (1.2 mi) south of its current southern terminus at Quebec Autoroute 5 and Boulevard Saint-Joseph.

However, following a landslide in Chelsea during the spring of 2008, the railway was halted after two weekends of activity. The owner decided to sell the train and ceased activities. The railway did not run for the summer of 2008.

Although operations resumed for 2009 and 2010, and various upgrades were considered, a notice on the official website currently states that they have been suspended again after heavy rains damaged the tracks during a storm that occurred on June 23 and 24, 2011. The train was once again put up for sale.

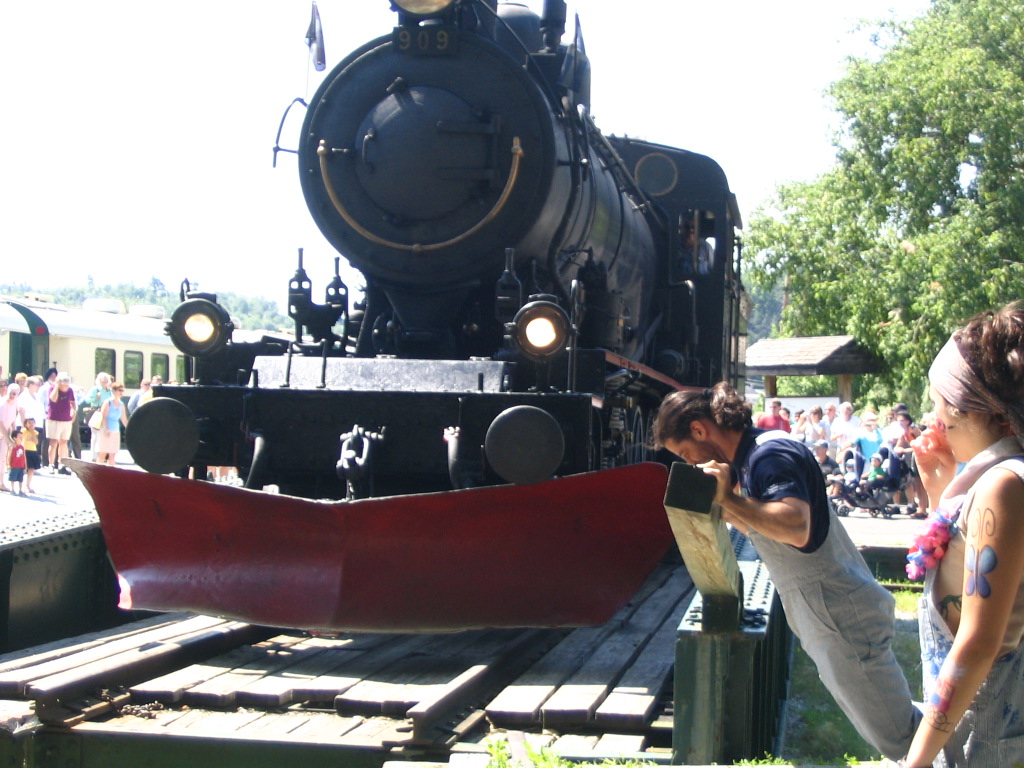
Turntable of the Hull-Chelsea-Wakefield railroad.

== Return ==
The train is now owned by the Chemin de fer de l'Outaouais. An attempt to obtain $5 million in provincial funding for track repair was rejected in January 2014. As of 2014 CCFO is continuing to seek private or governmental backing by August 2014 for a possible relaunch no earlier than 2015, although the vulnerability of the right-of-way to future washouts remains an undetermined risk.

In 2016, a consortium, Moose Rail, proposed Wakefield as a stop for a new privately run Ottawa-Gatineau commuter train service.

In July 2017 the municipality of Chelsea, Quebec pulled up 20 km (12 mi) of the track, seemingly ending any hopes of reopening the line.

One rail car (somewhere in a field) and the locomotive (in a barn in Bourget, ON) were sold, the rest have been scrapped and chopped up as of 2019. Thus ended the service for ever. Both locomotives remain in storage as of 2024.

== See also ==
- Letsgomoose
- List of heritage railways in Canada
- 1904 in rail transport
- Quebec Gatineau Railway
