= Curling at the 2023 Canada Winter Games =

2023 Canada Winter Games
- Host city: Summerside (Men's & Women's) & Montague (Mixed Doubles), Prince Edward Island
- Arena: The Silver Fox Entertainment Complex & Montague Curling Club
- Dates: February 19 – March 5
- Men's winner: Nova Scotia
- Curling club: Truro CC, Truro
- Skip: Calan MacIsaac
- Third: Nathan Gray
- Second: Owain Fisher
- Lead: Christopher McCurdy
- Coach: Craig Burgess
- Finalist: British Columbia (Parkinson)
- Women's winner: Nova Scotia
- Curling club: Chester CC, Chester
- Skip: Sophie Blades
- Third: Kate Weissent
- Second: Stephanie Atherton
- Lead: Alexis Cluney
- Coach: Andrew Atherton
- Finalist: Alberta (Plett)
- Mixed doubles winner: Alberta
- Curling club: Calgary CC, Calgary
- Female: Kaylee Raniseth
- Male: Evan Crough
- Coach: Deryk Kuny
- Finalist: Ontario (Zemmelink / Mulima)
- Previous: 2019
- Next: 2027

Curling at the 2023 Canada Winter Games took place at The Silver Fox Entertainment Complex and the Montague Curling Club in Summerside and Montague, Prince Edward Island. The women's event ran from Sunday, February 19, 2023, to Friday, February 24, 2023. The men's and mixed doubles events ran from Tuesday, February 28, 2023, to Sunday, March 5, 2023.

== Medallists ==
Curling	Gold	Silver	Bronze
Men	Nova Scotia; Calan MacIsaac; Nathan Gray; Owain Fisher; Christopher McCurdy	British Columbia; Chris Parkinson; Neil Imada; Graham Lee; Jesse Tiede	Ontario; Kyle Stratton; Liam Tardif; Dylan Stockton; Owen Nicholls
Women	Nova Scotia; Sophie Blades; Kate Weissent; Stephanie Atherton; Alexis Cluney	Alberta; Myla Plett; Alyssa Nedohin; Chloe Fediuk; Allie Iskiw	Quebec; Jolianne Fortin; Emy Lafrance; Megan Lafrance; Mégane Fortin
Mixed Doubles	Alberta; Kaylee Raniseth; Evan Crough	Ontario; Tori Zemmelink; Kibo Mulima	Quebec; Lauren Cheal; Cédric Maurice

== Men ==
=== Teams ===
The teams are listed as follows:

Province / Territory	Skip	Third	Second	Lead	Club
Alberta	Jaxon Hiebert	Oliver Burton	Kolby MacDonald	Nate Burton	Sherwood Park CC, Sherwood Park
British Columbia	Chris Parkinson	Neil Imada	Graham Lee	Jesse Tiede	Comox Valley CC, Courtenay
Manitoba	Jace Freeman	Elias Huminicki	Jack Steski	Rylan Graham	Virden CC, Virden
New Brunswick	Timothy Marin	Rajan Dalrymple	Emmett Knee	Cameron Sallaj	Thistle-St. Andrews CC, Saint John
Newfoundland and Labrador	Parker Tipple	Spencer Tipple	Jack Kinsella	Isaac Manuel	St. John's CC, St. John's
Northwest Territories	Jullian Bowling	Tasir Bhuiyan	Shawn Dragon	Ian Gau	Yellowknife CC, Yellowknife
Nova Scotia	Calan MacIsaac	Nathan Gray	Owain Fisher	Christopher McCurdy	Truro CC, Truro
Ontario	Kyle Stratton	Liam Tardif	Dylan Stockton	Owen Nicholls	London CC, London
Prince Edward Island	Brayden Snow	Jack MacFadyen	Davis Nicholson	Anderson MacDougall	Cornwall CC, Cornwall
Quebec	Raphaël Tremblay	Thomas Lauzon	Pierre-Olivier Roy	Justin Lapointe	CC Collines, Chelsea
Saskatchewan	Deon Laventure	Jayden Dauvin	Bohdan Booth	Karstin Soucy	Spiritwood CC, Spiritwood

=== Round robin standings ===
Final Round Robin Standings

Key
Teams to Playoffs

Pool A	Skip	W	L	PF	PA	EW	EL	BE	SE
Nova Scotia	Calan MacIsaac	4	0	29	11	17	7	1	10
Manitoba	Jace Freeman	3	1	16	12	11	9	3	7
Newfoundland and Labrador	Parker Tipple	2	2	19	21	10	17	1	0
Quebec	Raphaël Tremblay	1	3	15	22	11	16	2	4
Saskatchewan	Deon Laventure	0	4	20	33	13	13	3	6

Pool B	Skip	W	L	PF	PA	EW	EL	BE	SE
Alberta	Jaxon Hiebert	4	1	38	17	19	12	3	8
Ontario	Kyle Stratton	4	1	33	23	17	13	3	6
British Columbia	Chris Parkinson	3	2	27	27	17	15	1	4
Prince Edward Island	Brayden Snow	3	2	27	24	14	16	1	1
New Brunswick	Timothy Marin	1	4	24	33	17	19	1	4
Northwest Territories	Jullian Bowling	0	5	17	42	12	21	2	1

=== Round robin results ===
All draw times are listed in Atlantic Time (UTC−04:00).

==== Draw 1 ====
Tuesday, February 28, 10:00 am

Sheet B	1	2	3	4	5	6	7	8	9	Final
Saskatchewan (Laventure)	0	0	2	1	0	2	1	0	0	6
Quebec (Tremblay)	2	2	0	0	0	0	0	2	1	7

Sheet C	1	2	3	4	5	6	7	8	Final
British Columbia (Parkinson)	0	1	2	0	0	1	1	X	5
Prince Edward Island (Snow)	0	0	0	2	0	0	0	X	2

Sheet D	1	2	3	4	5	6	7	8	Final
Northwest Territories (Bowling)	1	0	0	2	0	0	0	X	3
Alberta (Hiebert)	0	4	3	0	0	1	2	X	10

==== Draw 2 ====
Tuesday, February 28, 2:00 pm

Sheet A	1	2	3	4	5	6	7	8	Final
New Brunswick (Marin)	0	1	0	1	0	1	0	X	3
British Columbia (Parkinson)	2	0	1	0	2	0	2	X	7

Sheet C	1	2	3	4	5	6	7	8	Final
Northwest Territories (Bowling)	0	0	0	0	1	1	X	X	2
Ontario (Stratton)	3	1	3	3	0	0	X	X	10

Sheet D	1	2	3	4	5	6	7	8	Final
Saskatchewan (Laventure)	1	0	2	1	2	0	1	0	7
Newfoundland and Labrador (Tipple)	0	4	0	0	0	2	0	3	9

==== Draw 3 ====
Wednesday, March 1, 10:00 am

Sheet B	1	2	3	4	5	6	7	8	Final
Alberta (Hiebert)	0	2	0	0	1	0	0	X	3
Prince Edward Island (Snow)	2	0	2	0	0	1	0	X	5

Sheet C	1	2	3	4	5	6	7	8	Final
Quebec (Tremblay)	0	1	1	0	1	0	0	0	3
Manitoba (Freeman)	0	0	0	2	0	0	1	1	4

==== Draw 4 ====
Wednesday, March 1, 2:00 pm

Sheet A	1	2	3	4	5	6	7	8	Final
Newfoundland and Labrador (Tipple)	0	0	0	0	2	0	1	X	3
Nova Scotia (MacIsaac)	2	1	1	1	0	1	0	X	6

Sheet B	1	2	3	4	5	6	7	8	Final
British Columbia (Parkinson)	2	3	0	2	0	1	0	X	8
Northwest Territories (Bowling)	0	0	1	0	2	0	1	X	4

Sheet D	1	2	3	4	5	6	7	8	Final
Ontario (Stratton)	0	0	3	1	0	0	1	1	6
New Brunswick (Marin)	1	1	0	0	0	2	0	0	4

==== Draw 5 ====
Thursday, March 2, 10:00 am

Sheet A	1	2	3	4	5	6	7	8	Final
Prince Edward Island (Snow)	0	0	0	1	0	2	0	0	3
Ontario (Stratton)	0	0	1	0	2	0	0	1	4

Sheet B	1	2	3	4	5	6	7	8	Final
Manitoba (Freeman)	1	0	1	1	0	0	1	X	4
Newfoundland and Labrador (Tipple)	0	0	0	0	2	0	0	X	2

Sheet C	1	2	3	4	5	6	7	8	Final
New Brunswick (Marin)	2	0	0	0	1	0	0	X	3
Alberta (Hiebert)	0	3	1	1	0	1	1	X	7

Sheet D	1	2	3	4	5	6	7	8	Final
Nova Scotia (MacIsaac)	2	1	1	2	1	0	X	X	7
Quebec (Tremblay)	0	0	0	0	0	1	X	X	1

==== Draw 6 ====
Thursday, March 2, 2:00 pm

Sheet A	1	2	3	4	5	6	7	8	Final
Northwest Territories (Bowling)	0	0	1	0	0	0	3	0	4
New Brunswick (Marin)	2	1	0	1	0	1	0	1	6

Sheet B	1	2	3	4	5	6	7	8	Final
Nova Scotia (MacIsaac)	5	0	4	0	1	0	0	X	10
Saskatchewan (Laventure)	0	1	0	3	0	0	2	X	6

Sheet C	1	2	3	4	5	6	7	8	Final
Ontario (Stratton)	1	1	0	3	0	5	X	X	10
British Columbia (Parkinson)	0	0	2	0	2	0	X	X	4

==== Draw 7 ====
Friday, March 3, 10:00 am

Sheet A	1	2	3	4	5	6	7	8	Final
Saskatchewan (Laventure)	0	0	0	0	0	1	X	X	1
Manitoba (Freeman)	4	0	2	0	1	0	X	X	7

Sheet C	1	2	3	4	5	6	7	8	Final
Prince Edward Island (Snow)	0	1	0	4	0	1	0	2	8
Northwest Territories (Bowling)	1	0	2	0	0	0	1	0	4

Sheet D	1	2	3	4	5	6	7	8	Final
Alberta (Hiebert)	0	2	0	2	0	1	3	X	8
British Columbia (Parkinson)	1	0	1	0	1	0	0	X	3

==== Draw 8 ====
Friday, March 3, 2:00 pm

Sheet A	1	2	3	4	5	6	7	8	Final
Quebec (Tremblay)	0	0	1	0	2	0	1	0	4
Newfoundland and Labrador (Tipple)	2	0	0	1	0	1	0	1	5

Sheet B	1	2	3	4	5	6	7	8	Final
Ontario (Stratton)	0	0	2	0	0	1	X	X	3
Alberta (Hiebert)	2	1	0	4	3	0	X	X	10

Sheet C	1	2	3	4	5	6	7	8	Final
Manitoba (Freeman)	0	0	0	0	1	0	X	X	1
Nova Scotia (MacIsaac)	2	2	1	1	0	0	X	X	6

Sheet D	1	2	3	4	5	6	7	8	Final
New Brunswick (Marin)	0	1	1	0	3	0	3	0	8
Prince Edward Island (Snow)	1	0	0	2	0	5	0	1	9

=== Playoffs ===
Qualification games
B2	Ontario	6
A3	Newfoundland and Labrador	3
A2	Manitoba	2
B3	British Columbia	5

Semifinals
A1	Nova Scotia	7
B2	Ontario	1
B1	Alberta	5
B3	British Columbia	6

Final
A1	Nova Scotia	7
B3	British Columbia	3
Bronze medal game
B2	Ontario	7
B1	Alberta	6

==== Qualification games ====
Saturday, March 4, 9:00 am

Sheet B	1	2	3	4	5	6	7	8	Final
Ontario (Stratton)	1	3	0	1	0	0	1	X	6
Newfoundland and Labrador (Tipple)	0	0	1	0	1	1	0	X	3

Sheet D	1	2	3	4	5	6	7	8	Final
Manitoba (Freeman)	1	0	0	0	1	0	0	X	2
British Columbia (Parkinson)	0	1	1	1	0	1	1	X	5

==== Semifinals ====
Saturday, March 4, 2:00 pm

Sheet B	1	2	3	4	5	6	7	8	Final
Alberta (Hiebert)	2	0	1	0	1	0	1	0	5
British Columbia (Parkinson)	0	1	0	1	0	3	0	1	6

Sheet D	1	2	3	4	5	6	7	8	Final
Nova Scotia (MacIsaac)	1	1	1	1	3	0	X	X	7
Ontario (Stratton)	0	0	0	0	0	1	X	X	1

==== Bronze medal game ====
Sunday, March 5, 12:00 pm

Sheet C	1	2	3	4	5	6	7	8	Final
Ontario (Stratton)	3	0	0	1	1	0	1	1	7
Alberta (Hiebert)	0	2	1	0	0	3	0	0	6

==== Final ====
Sunday, March 5, 12:00 pm

Sheet A	1	2	3	4	5	6	7	8	Final
Nova Scotia (MacIsaac)	0	3	1	0	0	3	0	X	7
British Columbia (Parkinson)	0	0	0	1	1	0	1	X	3

=== Consolation ===
For Seeds 7 to 11

Team	Skip	W	L	PF	PA
Prince Edward Island	Brayden Snow	4	3	42	34
Quebec	Raphaël Tremblay	3	4	34	42
Saskatchewan	Deon Laventure	3	4	42	50
New Brunswick	Timothy Marin	1	6	35	48
Northwest Territories	Jullian Bowling	0	7	28	58

=== Final standings ===
Place	Team
1st place, gold medalist(s)	Nova Scotia
2nd place, silver medalist(s)	British Columbia
3rd place, bronze medalist(s)	Ontario
4	Alberta
5	Manitoba
6	Newfoundland and Labrador
7	Prince Edward Island
8	Quebec
9	Saskatchewan
10	New Brunswick
11	Northwest Territories

== Women ==
=== Teams ===
The teams are listed as follows:

Province / Territory	Skip	Third	Second	Lead	Club(s)
Alberta	Myla Plett	Alyssa Nedohin	Chloe Fediuk	Allie Iskiw	Airdrie/Sherwood Park
British Columbia	Hannah Rempel	Lauren Cochrane	Megan Rempel	Claire Ramsey	Kelowna CC, Kelowna
Manitoba	Dayna Wahl	Piper Stoesz	Anna Marie Ginters	Gillian Hildebrand	Altona CC, Altona
New Brunswick	Mélodie Forsythe	Rebecca Watson	Izzy Paterson	Caylee Smith	Capital WC, Fredericton
Newfoundland and Labrador	Cailey Locke	Katie Peddigrew	Sitaye Penney	Kate Young	St. John's CC, St. John's
Northwest Territories	Reese Wainman	Alexandria Testart-Campbell	Brooke Smith	Tamara Bain	Inuvik CC, Inuvik
Nova Scotia	Sophie Blades	Kate Weissent	Stephanie Atherton	Alexis Cluney	Chester CC, Chester
Ontario	Ava Acres	Aila Thompson	Liana Flanagan	Mya Sharpe	RCMP CC, Ottawa
Prince Edward Island	Ella Lenentine	Makiya Noonan	Kacey Gauthier	Erika Pater	Cornwall CC, Cornwall
Quebec	Jolianne Fortin	Emy Lafrance	Megan Lafrance	Mégane Fortin	CC Kénogami, Jonquière
Saskatchewan	Hannah Rugg	Mya Silversides	Claudia Lacell	Madison Sagert	Highland CC, Regina
Yukon	Taylor Legge	Neizha Snider	Dannika Mikkelsen	Whitney Kasook	Whitehorse CC, Whitehorse

=== Round robin standings ===
Final Round Robin Standings

Key
Teams to Playoffs

Pool A	Skip	W	L	PF	PA	EW	EL	BE	SE
Nova Scotia	Sophie Blades	4	1	36	22	19	16	0	6
Alberta	Myla Plett	4	1	32	22	20	15	2	8
Manitoba	Dayna Wahl	3	2	30	22	20	13	2	11
Prince Edward Island	Ella Lenentine	2	3	36	26	19	17	0	9
New Brunswick	Mélodie Forsythe	2	3	22	35	12	20	1	4
Yukon	Taylor Legge	0	5	17	46	11	20	0	1

Pool B	Skip	W	L	PF	PA	EW	EL	BE	SE
Quebec	Jolianne Fortin	4	1	39	21	23	10	1	11
Saskatchewan	Hannah Rugg	3	2	35	18	20	11	2	8
Ontario	Ava Acres	3	2	29	29	17	20	3	3
British Columbia	Hannah Rempel	2	3	27	34	15	18	1	3
Northwest Territories	Reese Wainman	2	3	20	32	13	19	5	4
Newfoundland and Labrador	Cailey Locke	1	4	17	33	11	21	3	2

=== Round robin results ===
All draw times are listed in Atlantic Time (UTC−04:00).

==== Draw 1 ====
Sunday, February 19, 10:00 am

Sheet A	1	2	3	4	5	6	7	8	Final
New Brunswick (Forsythe)	2	0	4	2	0	2	0	X	10
Yukon (Legge)	0	1	0	0	1	0	2	X	4

Sheet B	1	2	3	4	5	6	7	8	Final
Nova Scotia (Blades)	0	2	0	0	2	2	2	X	8
Prince Edward Island (Lenentine)	1	0	2	1	0	0	0	X	4

Sheet C	1	2	3	4	5	6	7	8	Final
Saskatchewan (Rugg)	0	3	1	1	3	1	X	X	9
Newfoundland and Labrador (Locke)	0	0	0	0	0	0	X	X	0

Sheet D	1	2	3	4	5	6	7	8	9	Final
Northwest Territories (Wainman)	0	2	0	0	1	0	1	1	2	7
Ontario (Acres)	1	0	0	1	0	3	0	0	0	5

==== Draw 2 ====
Sunday, February 19, 2:00 pm

Sheet A	1	2	3	4	5	6	7	8	Final
Quebec (Fortin)	0	1	0	1	0	1	2	3	8
Saskatchewan (Rugg)	1	0	5	0	1	0	0	0	7

Sheet B	1	2	3	4	5	6	7	8	Final
Yukon (Legge)	0	2	0	0	0	0	X	X	2
Alberta (Plett)	4	0	1	2	1	1	X	X	9

Sheet C	1	2	3	4	5	6	7	8	9	Final
Northwest Territories (Wainman)	1	0	0	3	0	1	0	0	0	5
British Columbia (Rempel)	0	2	0	0	1	0	2	0	1	6

Sheet D	1	2	3	4	5	6	7	8	Final
Nova Scotia (Blades)	2	2	0	0	0	1	0	1	6
Manitoba (Wahl)	0	0	1	1	1	0	1	0	4

==== Draw 3 ====
Monday, February 20, 10:00 am

Sheet B	1	2	3	4	5	6	7	8	9	Final
Ontario (Acres)	1	0	1	0	1	1	0	1	1	6
Newfoundland and Labrador (Locke)	0	1	0	2	0	0	2	0	0	5

Sheet C	1	2	3	4	5	6	7	8	Final
Prince Edward Island (Lenentine)	0	2	3	3	2	3	X	X	13
New Brunswick (Forsythe)	1	0	0	0	0	0	X	X	1

==== Draw 4 ====
Monday, February 20, 2:00 pm

Sheet A	1	2	3	4	5	6	7	8	Final
Manitoba (Wahl)	0	0	0	2	0	1	0	1	4
Alberta (Plett)	2	1	1	0	0	0	2	0	6

Sheet B	1	2	3	4	5	6	7	8	Final
Saskatchewan (Rugg)	0	2	0	1	0	0	0	0	3
Northwest Territories (Wainman)	0	0	2	0	0	0	0	2	4

Sheet C	1	2	3	4	5	6	7	8	Final
Yukon (Legge)	0	0	1	0	0	2	X	X	3
Nova Scotia (Blades)	2	3	0	4	1	0	X	X	10

Sheet D	1	2	3	4	5	6	7	8	Final
British Columbia (Rempel)	0	0	3	0	3	0	1	0	7
Quebec (Fortin)	2	0	0	3	0	1	0	2	8

==== Draw 5 ====
Tuesday, February 21, 2:00 pm

Sheet A	1	2	3	4	5	6	7	8	Final
Newfoundland and Labrador (Locke)	0	1	3	0	1	0	0	X	5
British Columbia (Rempel)	0	0	0	2	0	1	4	X	7

Sheet B	1	2	3	4	5	6	7	8	Final
New Brunswick (Forsythe)	0	0	0	0	0	0	X	X	0
Manitoba (Wahl)	2	1	0	1	1	1	X	X	6

Sheet C	1	2	3	4	5	6	7	8	Final
Quebec (Fortin)	0	0	1	0	1	1	0	1	4
Ontario (Acres)	0	2	0	1	0	0	3	0	6

Sheet D	1	2	3	4	5	6	7	8	Final
Alberta (Plett)	0	1	1	0	0	2	0	2	6
Prince Edward Island (Lenentine)	1	0	0	1	1	0	2	0	5

==== Draw 6 ====
Wednesday, February 22, 10:00 am

Sheet A	1	2	3	4	5	6	7	8	Final
Northwest Territories (Wainman)	0	0	0	0	0	0	X	X	0
Quebec (Fortin)	2	1	1	1	2	5	X	X	12

Sheet B	1	2	3	4	5	6	7	8	Final
Alberta (Plett)	0	2	0	0	1	0	1	X	4
Nova Scotia (Blades)	3	0	2	1	0	1	0	X	7

Sheet C	1	2	3	4	5	6	7	8	Final
British Columbia (Rempel)	0	2	0	0	1	0	0	X	3
Saskatchewan (Rugg)	3	0	1	1	0	1	1	X	7

Sheet D	1	2	3	4	5	6	7	8	Final
Manitoba (Wahl)	4	3	0	0	1	0	0	X	8
Yukon (Legge)	0	0	1	0	0	4	0	X	5

==== Draw 7 ====
Wednesday, February 22, 2:00 pm

Sheet A	1	2	3	4	5	6	7	8	Final
Nova Scotia (Blades)	2	0	1	0	0	2	0	X	5
New Brunswick (Forsythe)	0	2	0	3	1	0	1	X	7

Sheet B	1	2	3	4	5	6	7	8	Final
Prince Edward Island (Lenentine)	2	0	4	1	0	0	2	X	9
Yukon (Legge)	0	1	0	0	1	1	0	X	3

Sheet C	1	2	3	4	5	6	7	8	9	Final
Newfoundland and Labrador (Locke)	0	0	2	1	0	1	0	0	2	6
Northwest Territories (Wainman)	0	0	0	0	1	0	1	2	0	4

Sheet D	1	2	3	4	5	6	7	8	Final
Ontario (Acres)	0	2	0	1	0	0	0	X	3
Saskatchewan (Rugg)	1	0	2	0	2	3	1	X	9

==== Draw 8 ====
Thursday, February 23, 10:00 am

Sheet A	1	2	3	4	5	6	7	8	Final
Prince Edward Island (Lenentine)	0	1	0	2	2	0	0	0	5
Manitoba (Wahl)	1	0	1	0	0	2	1	3	8

Sheet B	1	2	3	4	5	6	7	8	Final
British Columbia (Rempel)	0	1	0	0	1	0	2	X	4
Ontario (Acres)	2	0	4	3	0	0	0	X	9

Sheet C	1	2	3	4	5	6	7	8	Final
New Brunswick (Forsythe)	0	1	0	1	0	2	0	0	4
Alberta (Plett)	0	0	2	0	1	0	2	2	7

Sheet D	1	2	3	4	5	6	7	8	Final
Quebec (Fortin)	0	2	0	1	1	3	X	X	7
Newfoundland and Labrador (Locke)	0	0	1	0	0	0	X	X	1

=== Playoffs ===
Qualification games
B2	Saskatchewan	5
A3	Manitoba	2
A2	Alberta	6
B3	Ontario	3

Semifinals
A1	Nova Scotia	8
B2	Saskatchewan	6
B1	Quebec	3
A2	Alberta	7

Final
A1	Nova Scotia	9
A2	Alberta	5
Bronze medal game
B2	Saskatchewan	5
B1	Quebec	7

==== Qualification games ====
Thursday, February 23, 6:00 pm

Sheet B	1	2	3	4	5	6	7	8	Final
Saskatchewan (Rugg)	0	0	1	0	0	3	0	1	5
Manitoba (Wahl)	0	0	0	1	0	0	1	0	2

Sheet D	1	2	3	4	5	6	7	8	Final
Alberta (Plett)	2	1	1	0	1	1	0	X	6
Ontario (Acres)	0	0	0	2	0	0	1	X	3

==== Semifinals ====
Friday, February 24, 10:00 am

Sheet B	1	2	3	4	5	6	7	8	Final
Quebec (Fortin)	0	1	0	1	1	0	0	X	3
Alberta (Plett)	3	0	2	0	0	1	1	X	7

Sheet D	1	2	3	4	5	6	7	8	Final
Nova Scotia (Blades)	2	0	0	3	1	0	1	1	8
Saskatchewan (Rugg)	0	2	3	0	0	1	0	0	6

==== Bronze medal game ====
Friday, February 24, 2:00 pm

Sheet C	1	2	3	4	5	6	7	8	9	Final
Saskatchewan (Rugg)	2	0	1	0	0	1	0	1	0	5
Quebec (Fortin)	0	2	0	0	1	0	2	0	2	7

==== Final ====
Friday, February 24, 2:00 pm

Sheet A	1	2	3	4	5	6	7	8	Final
Nova Scotia (Blades)	3	0	0	0	3	3	0	X	9
Alberta (Plett)	0	2	1	0	0	0	2	X	5

=== Consolation ===
For Seeds 7 to 12

==== Seventh place game ====
Friday, February 24, 10:00 am

Sheet C	1	2	3	4	5	6	7	8	Final
Prince Edward Island (Lenentine)	0	0	3	0	1	0	2	0	6
British Columbia (Rempel)	1	1	0	3	0	3	0	2	10

==== Ninth place game ====
Thursday, February 23, 6:00 pm

Sheet C	1	2	3	4	5	6	7	8	Final
New Brunswick (Forsythe)	1	0	4	0	2	2	X	X	9
Northwest Territories (Wainman)	0	2	0	1	0	0	X	X	3

==== Eleventh place game ====
Thursday, February 23, 6:00 pm

Sheet A	1	2	3	4	5	6	7	8	Final
Yukon (Legge)	0	0	0	0	3	2	0	X	5
Newfoundland and Labrador (Locke)	1	2	2	1	0	0	3	X	9

=== Final standings ===
Place	Team
1st place, gold medalist(s)	Nova Scotia
2nd place, silver medalist(s)	Alberta
3rd place, bronze medalist(s)	Quebec
4	Saskatchewan
5	Ontario
6	Manitoba
7	British Columbia
8	Prince Edward Island
9	New Brunswick
10	Northwest Territories
11	Newfoundland and Labrador
12	Yukon

== Mixed doubles ==
=== Teams ===
The teams are listed as follows:

Province / Territory	Female	Male	Club
Alberta	Kaylee Raniseth	Evan Crough	Calgary CC, Calgary
British Columbia	Emily Bowles	Adam Fenton	Victoria CC, Victoria
Manitoba	Mackenzie Arbuckle	Aaron Macdonell	St. Vital CC, Winnipeg
New Brunswick	Julia Evans	Noah Riggs	Gage G&CC, Oromocto
Newfoundland and Labrador	Kate Paterson	Sam Follett	St. John's CC, St. John's
Northwest Territories	Adrianna Hendrick	Mason MacNeil	Inuvik CC, Inuvik
Nova Scotia	Olivia McDonah	Tyler McMullen	Truro CC, Truro
Ontario	Tori Zemmelink	Kibo Mulima	Guelph CC, Guelph
Prince Edward Island	Ella Lenentine	Mitchell Schut	Cornwall CC, Cornwall
Quebec	Lauren Cheal	Cédric Maurice	Lennoxville CC, Lennoxville
Saskatchewan	Melissa Remeshylo	Dylan Derksen	Martensville CC, Martensville
Yukon	Bayly Scoffin	Nicolas Fecteau	Whitehorse CC, Whitehorse

=== Round robin standings ===
Final Round Robin Standings

Key
Teams to Playoffs

Pool A	Athletes	W	L	PF	PA	EW	EL	BE	SE
British Columbia	Emily Bowles / Adam Fenton	4	1	30	20	21	15	0	12
Quebec	Lauren Cheal / Cédric Maurice	4	1	45	29	20	17	0	5
Alberta	Kaylee Raniseth / Evan Crough	4	1	39	18	23	13	0	14
Saskatchewan	Melissa Remeshylo / Dylan Derksen	2	3	19	33	13	24	0	5
Newfoundland and Labrador	Kate Paterson / Sam Follett	1	4	20	32	16	20	0	5
Yukon	Bayly Scoffin / Nicolas Fecteau	0	5	20	41	16	20	0	7

Pool B	Athletes	W	L	PF	PA	EW	EL	BE	SE
Ontario	Tori Zemmelink / Kibo Mulima	5	0	43	18	21	15	0	8
Manitoba	Mackenzie Arbuckle / Aaron Macdonell	3	2	40	24	21	15	0	13
New Brunswick	Julia Evans / Noah Riggs	2	3	35	35	17	19	0	6
Nova Scotia	Olivia McDonah / Tyler McMullen	2	3	22	37	17	19	1	9
Prince Edward Island	Ella Lenentine / Mitchell Schut	2	3	26	33	18	20	0	7
Northwest Territories	Adrianna Hendrick / Mason MacNeil	1	4	21	40	13	19	0	5

=== Round robin results ===
All draw times are listed in Atlantic Time (UTC−04:00).

==== Draw 1 ====
Tuesday, February 28, 10:00 am

Sheet A	1	2	3	4	5	6	7	8	Final
Alberta (Raniseth / Crough)	3	1	2	2	2	0	0	X	10
Yukon (Scoffin / Fecteau)	0	0	0	0	0	1	1	X	2

Sheet B	1	2	3	4	5	6	7	8	Final
Quebec (Cheal / Maurice)	0	0	2	0	1	0	1	X	4
British Columbia (Bowles / Fenton)	3	2	0	1	0	1	0	X	7

Sheet C	1	2	3	4	5	6	7	8	Final
Saskatchewan (Remeshylo / Derksen)	0	0	0	1	1	1	0	2	5
Newfoundland and Labrador (Paterson / Follett)	1	1	1	0	0	0	1	0	4

==== Draw 2 ====
Tuesday, February 28, 2:00 pm

Sheet A	1	2	3	4	5	6	7	8	Final
Ontario (Zemmelink / Mulima)	3	0	3	0	0	2	2	X	10
Prince Edward Island (Lenentine / Schut)	0	2	0	1	2	0	0	X	5

Sheet B	1	2	3	4	5	6	7	8	Final
Manitoba (Arbuckle / Macdonell)	2	1	1	0	0	6	X	X	10
Nova Scotia (McDonah / McMullen)	0	0	0	1	1	0	X	X	2

Sheet C	1	2	3	4	5	6	7	8	Final
New Brunswick (Evans / Riggs)	0	5	0	2	1	3	X	X	11
Northwest Territories (Hendrick / MacNeil)	1	0	3	0	0	0	X	X	4

==== Draw 3 ====
Tuesday, February 28, 4:00 pm

Sheet A	1	2	3	4	5	6	7	8	Final
Nova Scotia (McDonah / McMullen)	0	0	0	2	0	1	0	X	3
New Brunswick (Evans / Riggs)	1	3	2	0	2	0	2	X	10

Sheet B	1	2	3	4	5	6	7	8	Final
Ontario (Zemmelink / Mulima)	3	4	0	2	2	0	X	X	11
Northwest Territories (Hendrick / MacNeil)	0	0	1	0	0	1	X	X	2

Sheet C	1	2	3	4	5	6	7	8	Final
Manitoba (Arbuckle / Macdonell)	0	0	1	0	2	3	0	0	6
Prince Edward Island (Lenentine / Schut)	2	1	0	2	0	0	2	1	8

==== Draw 4 ====
Wednesday, March 1, 10:00 am

Sheet A	1	2	3	4	5	6	7	8	Final
British Columbia (Bowles / Fenton)	2	1	1	1	0	1	0	X	6
Saskatchewan (Remeshylo / Derksen)	0	0	0	0	1	0	1	X	2

Sheet B	1	2	3	4	5	6	7	8	Final
Alberta (Raniseth / Crough)	0	5	2	1	1	0	X	X	9
Newfoundland and Labrador (Paterson / Follett)	1	0	0	0	0	1	X	X	2

Sheet C	1	2	3	4	5	6	7	8	Final
Quebec (Cheal / Maurice)	0	2	0	0	4	0	5	X	11
Yukon (Scoffin / Fecteau)	1	0	1	2	0	2	0	X	6

==== Draw 5 ====
Wednesday, March 1, 1:00 pm

Sheet A	1	2	3	4	5	6	7	8	Final
Quebec (Cheal / Maurice)	1	0	4	0	0	1	0	2	8
Alberta (Raniseth / Crough)	0	2	0	1	2	0	2	0	7

Sheet B	1	2	3	4	5	6	7	8	Final
Yukon (Scoffin / Fecteau)	1	1	1	1	0	0	0	1	5
Saskatchewan (Remeshylo / Derksen)	0	0	0	0	3	2	1	0	6

Sheet C	1	2	3	4	5	6	7	8	Final
Newfoundland and Labrador (Paterson / Follett)	0	0	1	1	0	0	1	X	3
British Columbia (Bowles / Fenton)	1	2	0	0	1	1	0	X	5

==== Draw 6 ====
Wednesday, March 1, 4:00 pm

Sheet A	1	2	3	4	5	6	7	8	Final
Manitoba (Arbuckle / Macdonell)	0	1	0	1	1	0	0	0	3
Ontario (Zemmelink / Mulima)	2	0	1	0	0	2	1	1	7

Sheet B	1	2	3	4	5	6	7	8	Final
Prince Edward Island (Lenentine / Schut)	2	0	1	0	1	1	2	1	8
New Brunswick (Evans / Riggs)	0	1	0	3	0	0	0	0	4

Sheet C	1	2	3	4	5	6	7	8	Final
Northwest Territories (Hendrick / MacNeil)	0	0	0	4	0	0	2	X	6
Nova Scotia (McDonah / McMullen)	2	1	1	0	2	2	0	X	8

==== Draw 7 ====
Thursday, March 2, 10:00 am

Sheet A	1	2	3	4	5	6	7	8	9	Final
Prince Edward Island (Lenentine / Schut)	0	2	0	0	0	1	0	1	0	4
Nova Scotia (McDonah / McMullen)	1	0	1	1	1	0	0	0	1	5

Sheet B	1	2	3	4	5	6	7	8	Final
Northwest Territories (Hendrick / MacNeil)	0	0	0	0	0	1	X	X	1
Manitoba (Arbuckle / Macdonell)	3	1	1	2	2	0	X	X	9

Sheet C	1	2	3	4	5	6	7	8	Final
Ontario (Zemmelink / Mulima)	2	0	4	0	2	0	0	X	8
New Brunswick (Evans / Riggs)	0	1	0	1	0	1	1	X	4

==== Draw 8 ====
Thursday, March 2, 1:00 pm

Sheet A	1	2	3	4	5	6	7	8	Final
Yukon (Scoffin / Fecteau)	0	2	0	0	0	0	1	X	3
British Columbia (Bowles / Fenton)	1	0	2	1	1	3	0	X	8

Sheet B	1	2	3	4	5	6	7	8	Final
Newfoundland and Labrador (Paterson / Follett)	0	2	0	0	2	0	1	0	5
Quebec (Cheal / Maurice)	2	0	1	1	0	3	0	2	9

Sheet C	1	2	3	4	5	6	7	8	Final
Alberta (Raniseth / Crough)	0	1	1	1	1	1	0	X	5
Saskatchewan (Remeshylo / Derksen)	1	0	0	0	0	0	1	X	2

==== Draw 9 ====
Thursday, March 2, 4:00 pm

Sheet A	1	2	3	4	5	6	7	8	Final
Saskatchewan (Remeshylo / Derksen)	0	2	0	0	2	0	0	X	4
Quebec (Cheal / Maurice)	4	0	3	1	0	2	3	X	13

Sheet B	1	2	3	4	5	6	7	8	Final
British Columbia (Bowles / Fenton)	0	0	0	2	1	0	1	0	4
Alberta (Raniseth / Crough)	1	1	1	0	0	1	0	4	8

Sheet C	1	2	3	4	5	6	7	8	Final
Yukon (Scoffin / Fecteau)	0	0	1	0	2	0	1	X	4
Newfoundland and Labrador (Paterson / Follett)	1	2	0	1	0	2	0	X	6

==== Draw 10 ====
Friday, March 3, 10:00 am

Sheet A	1	2	3	4	5	6	7	8	Final
New Brunswick (Evans / Riggs)	4	0	0	0	0	2	0	0	6
Manitoba (Arbuckle / Macdonell)	0	3	1	1	1	0	3	3	12

Sheet B	1	2	3	4	5	6	7	8	Final
Nova Scotia (McDonah / McMullen)	1	0	0	0	2	0	1	0	4
Ontario (Zemmelink / Mulima)	0	2	2	1	0	1	0	1	7

Sheet C	1	2	3	4	5	6	7	8	Final
Prince Edward Island (Lenentine / Schut)	0	0	0	0	0	1	0	X	1
Northwest Territories (Hendrick / MacNeil)	1	1	2	1	1	0	2	X	8

=== Playoffs ===
Qualification games
B2	Manitoba	4
A3	Alberta	6
A2	Quebec	10
B3	New Brunswick	5

Semifinals
A1	British Columbia	6
A3	Alberta	7
B1	Ontario	8
A2	Quebec	5

Final
A3	Alberta	6
B1	Ontario	5
Bronze medal game
A1	British Columbia	6
A2	Quebec	12

==== Qualification games ====
Friday, March 3, 2:00 pm

Sheet A	1	2	3	4	5	6	7	8	Final
Manitoba (Arbuckle / Macdonell)	1	1	0	0	0	0	2	0	4
Alberta (Raniseth / Crough)	0	0	1	1	2	1	0	1	6

Sheet C	1	2	3	4	5	6	7	8	Final
Quebec (Cheal / Maurice)	3	0	4	0	2	0	1	X	10
New Brunswick (Evans / Riggs)	0	1	0	1	0	3	0	X	5

==== Semifinals ====
Saturday, March 4, 2:00 pm

Sheet A	1	2	3	4	5	6	7	8	Final
Ontario (Zemmelink / Mulima)	1	1	1	0	1	2	0	2	8
Quebec (Cheal / Maurice)	0	0	0	1	0	0	4	0	5

Sheet B	1	2	3	4	5	6	7	8	9	Final
British Columbia (Bowles / Fenton)	0	0	1	2	0	1	0	2	0	6
Alberta (Raniseth / Crough)	1	2	0	0	1	0	2	0	1	7

==== Bronze medal game ====
Saturday, March 4, 6:00 pm

Sheet B	1	2	3	4	5	6	7	8	Final
British Columbia (Bowles / Fenton)	2	0	0	2	1	1	0	X	6
Quebec (Cheal / Maurice)	0	5	3	0	0	0	4	X	12

==== Final ====
Saturday, March 4, 6:00 pm

Sheet A	1	2	3	4	5	6	7	8	Final
Alberta (Raniseth / Crough)	0	0	0	1	3	0	1	1	6
Ontario (Zemmelink / Mulima)	1	2	1	0	0	1	0	0	5

=== Consolation ===
For Seeds 7 to 12

==== Seventh place game ====
Friday, March 3, 6:00 pm

Sheet B	1	2	3	4	5	6	7	8	Final
Saskatchewan (Remeshylo / Derksen)	1	0	1	1	0	0	1	0	4
Nova Scotia (McDonah / McMullen)	0	1	0	0	2	1	0	1	5

==== Ninth place game ====
Friday, March 3, 6:00 pm

Sheet C	1	2	3	4	5	6	7	8	Final
Newfoundland and Labrador (Paterson / Follett)	0	3	1	1	1	0	0	0	6
Prince Edward Island (Lenentine / Schut)	3	0	0	0	0	2	1	1	7

==== Eleventh place game ====
Friday, March 3, 6:00 pm

Sheet A	1	2	3	4	5	6	7	8	Final
Yukon (Scoffin / Fecteau)	0	1	1	2	2	1	1	X	8
Northwest Territories (Hendrick / MacNeil)	1	0	0	0	0	0	0	X	1

=== Final standings ===
Place	Team
1st place, gold medalist(s)	Alberta
2nd place, silver medalist(s)	Ontario
3rd place, bronze medalist(s)	Quebec
4	British Columbia
5	Manitoba
6	New Brunswick
7	Nova Scotia
8	Saskatchewan
9	Prince Edward Island
10	Newfoundland and Labrador
11	Yukon
12	Northwest Territories
