= Gatineau River Yacht Club =

Coordinates: 45.303936°N 75.474078°W

- Abbreviation: GRYC
- Formation: 1962
- Legal status: active
- Location: 1 Chemin Summerlea, Chelsea, Quebec J9B 1A1
- Official language: English, French
- Affiliations: Britannia Yacht Club.
- Website: www.gryc.ca

The Gatineau River Yacht Club (GRYC) is located on Gatineau River in Chelsea, Quebec, Canada. The club is based on two small islands connected by a pontoon bridge.

== History ==
After farmland on both sides of the Gatineau River was flooded in 1926, hills were turned into islands. The road off the Gleneagle Road leading to the walkway of the Gatineau River Yacht Club is named Summerlea, which was the name of the region until it was changed to Gleneagle in the 1930s.

The club was officially opened on September 2, 1962, with an initial membership of five Chelsea residents: Gerry Byers, Pat Evans, Ivan Herbert, Allan Richens and John Winfield and a fleet of their five boats. The club's first commodore was Ivan Herbert. Pat Evans, one of the club's founders, served as the club historian. The original clubhouse was a small white cottage at the bottom of Gleneagle Road, off Route 105, which was rented in the spring of 1963. The initial membership chose the club's blue and white burgee with 'G R Y C' surrounding a circle of rope, with an anchor at the center. The initial club fees were set at $5 a year. By 1964, with a membership of 100 people, the club purchases an island for $12,000 near the site of the club's floating dock. The club consisted of two islands connected by a walkway, complete with cottage and two sleeping cabins. The Gatineau Boom Company donated lumber for a walkway to the island.

The GRYC island clubhouse, which resembles a pinecone, was designed by James Strutt based on the rhombic dodecahedron. Club members provided the labour and often donated the supplies. Club members erected the three-level clubhouse on a rocky hillside, out of a wood frame, plywood sheathing, and ribbed metal the colour of tree trunks during the summer and fall of 1978 for $21,000.

The yacht club hosts social events such as sleigh drives, tea and fashion shows, and "Hawaiian Night" theme parties, Box Socials. The club hosted the National Centennial Junior Sailing Championships in 1967 and an annual CJOH Regatta.

Club members Ed Quipp and Pat Evans built the original lighthouse, which was delivered to the island by pontoon barge. The lighthouse was destroyed in 1986 during a windstorm, which also uprooted about 60 trees on the island. The lighthouse and trees were replaced.

"Richens Point" on the main island, was named in honour of GRYC founder Allan Richens.

== Features ==
The main areas include: hand and vehicle launch ramps; island clubhouse, registration, office and washrooms; changing facilities, kitchen, main club room, first aid, parking and dock access. A "crow’s nest" at the peak of the island clubhouse serves as a playroom for children.

== Life at the club ==
=== Enrollment ===
Map of Chelsea, Quebec

Membership today is almost 400 members, mainly from the Gleneagle and Chelsea areas. The yacht club's fleet is eighty-three craft, from canoes to cabin cruisers. The club maintains its emphasis on sailing. The club also maintains an active dry sail program for day-sailing.

=== Programs ===
The sailing season extends from mid-April to late October. Sail training programs are active during the summer months for both youth and adults. The GRYC offers a children's summer camp and runs social events. The annual awards ceremony for the juniors took place each year around Labour Day.

Every year the club hosts sailing regattas that attract sailors from across Canada. The local racing scene consists of fleet, PY and PHRF races along with special racing events on weekends throughout the season. Many racing events are held in cooperation with the nearby Britannia Yacht Club and Club de Voile Grande-Rivière.

== Wildlife ==
For birdwatchers, species in or passing through the area include Arctic tern, black tern, New World blackbirds, black brant, Canada geese, common goldeneye, common merganser, common tern, double-crested cormorants, great blue heron, green-winged teal, gulls, killdeer, northern pintails, rails, red-throated loon, ring-billed gull, songbirds, spotted sandpiper, swallows, loggerhead shrike, least bittern, and wood ducks. The fish species in the Ottawa River near BYC include brown trout, small mouth bass and walleye. The reptiles, amphibians, and salamanders include American eels, American ginseng, American bullfrog, green frog, mudpuppy, painted turtles, snapping turtles, spotted turtle, and spring peeper. The mammals in the area include beaver, coyotes, eastern chipmunks, mink, muskrat, otter, porcupine, raccoons, red foxes, red squirrels, and woodchucks.

== Notable members ==
- Shona Moss, former Olympian, who sailed in the 1992 Barcelona Games
- Architects James Strutt, Bill Stranks, Ron Brand, and Doug Clancey
