= 2025 Yukon Scotties Tournament of Hearts =

Canadian territorial women's curling championship

- Host city: Whitehorse, Yukon
- Arena: Whitehorse Curling Club
- Dates: January 10–12
- Winner: Team Scoffin
- Curling club: Whitehorse CC, Whitehorse
- Skip: Bayly Scoffin
- Third: Raelyn Helston
- Second: Kerry Foster
- Lead: Bailey Horvey
- Alternate: Kimberly Tuor
- Finalist: Patty Wallingham

The 2025 Yukon Scotties Tournament of Hearts, the women's territorial curling championship for Yukon, was held from January 10 to 12 at the Whitehorse Curling Club in Whitehorse, Yukon. The winning Bayly Scoffin rink represented Yukon at the 2025 Scotties Tournament of Hearts in Thunder Bay, Ontario. The event was held in conjunction with the 2025 Yukon Men's Curling Championship, the territorial men's championship.

Since only two teams entered the territorial championship, the event is a best-of-5 format, with Scoffin winning 3–1 over the Patty Wallingham rink.

== Teams ==
The teams are as follows:

Skip	Third	Second	Lead	Alternate	Coach	Club
Bayly Scoffin	Raelyn Helston	Kerry Foster	Bailey Horvey	Kimberly Tuor		Whitehorse CC
Patty Wallingham	Kelsey Meger	Shelby Jensen	Chelsea Jarvis	Emily Matthews	Carolyn McRorie	Whitehorse CC

== Scores ==
All draw times are listed in Mountain Time (UTC-07:00).

=== Draw 1 ===
Friday, January 10, 1:00 pm

Sheet 2	1	2	3	4	5	6	7	8	9	10	11	Final
Bayly Scoffin	0	2	1	0	0	0	1	0	0	1	0	5
Patty Wallingham	0	0	0	1	1	1	0	2	0	0	1	6

=== Draw 2 ===
Saturday, January 11, 9:00 am

Sheet 6	1	2	3	4	5	6	7	8	9	10	Final
Patty Wallingham	0	0	0	0	1	0	2	0	X	X	3
Bayly Scoffin	0	1	2	1	0	1	0	4	X	X	9

=== Draw 3 ===
Saturday, January 11, 2:00 pm

Sheet 3	1	2	3	4	5	6	7	8	9	10	Final
Bayly Scoffin	2	1	0	2	0	1	0	0	3	X	9
Patty Wallingham	0	0	1	0	1	0	1	2	0	X	5

=== Draw 4 ===
Sunday, January 12, 9:00 am

Sheet 7	1	2	3	4	5	6	7	8	9	10	Final
Bayly Scoffin	0	1	0	0	1	1	3	1	X	X	7
Patty Wallingham	0	0	2	2	0	0	0	0	X	X	4

2025 Yukon Scotties Tournament of Hearts
(Yukon)
Bayly Scoffin
2nd Territorial Championship title
