= Chelsea, Quebec =

Chelsea
- Municipality
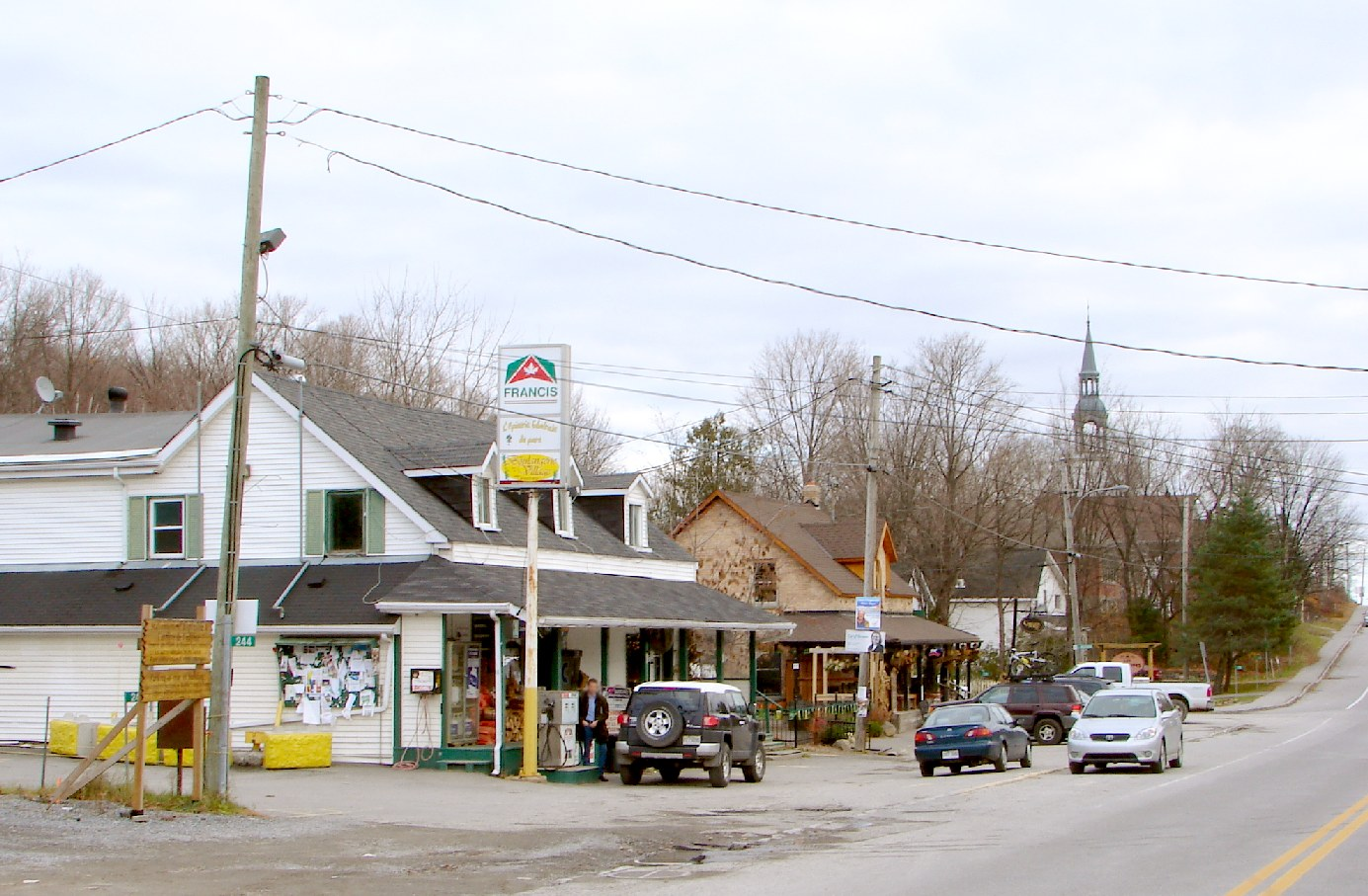
- Old Chelsea

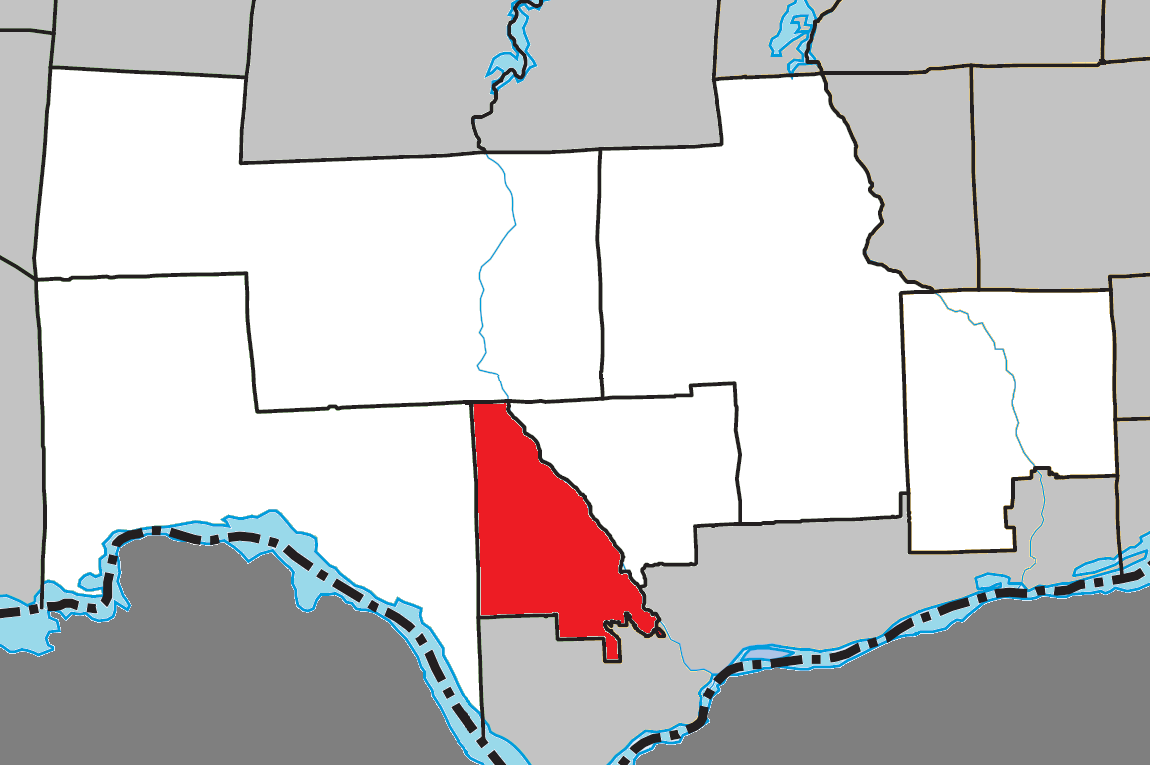
- Location within Les Collines-de-l'Outaouais RCM

- Location in western Quebec
- Coordinates: 45°30′N 75°47′W
- Country: Canada
- Province: Quebec
- Region: Outaouais
- RCM: Les Collines-de-l'Outaouais
- Constituted: January 1, 1875

Government
  - Mayor: Brian Nolan
  - Federal riding: Pontiac—Kitigan Zibi
  - Prov. riding: Gatineau

Area
  - Total: 121.10 km^{2} (46.76 sq mi)
  - Land: 113.77 km^{2} (43.93 sq mi)

Population (2021)
  - Total: 8,000
  - Density: 71/km^{2} (180/sq mi)
  - Pop 2016-2021: ▲15.8%
  - Dwellings: 3,376
- Demonym(s): Chelsien, Chelsienne
- Time zone: UTC−5 (EST)
  - Summer (DST): UTC−4 (EDT)
- Postal code(s): J9B 1C1
- Area code: 819
- Highways A-5: R-105
- Website: www.chelsea.ca

Chelsea is a municipality located immediately north of Gatineau, Quebec, Canada, and about 10 kilometres (6.2 mi) north of Ottawa. Chelsea is located within Canada's National Capital Region. It is the seat of Les Collines-de-l'Outaouais Regional County Municipality.

Its population was 8000 in the 2021 Canadian Census. The population of Chelsea is almost evenly divided between anglophones and francophones, with both official languages being spoken in roughly 70% of households.

While 60% of the area consists of Gatineau Park, much of the rest of Chelsea is residential.

A sports complex, the Meredith Centre, was developed in 2012 next to Chelsea Elementary School. The complex hosts a hockey rink, community rooms, and soccer fields. The mayor of Chelsea, QC is Pierre Guénard.

Part of the film Grey Owl was shot on the Gatineau River. A number of regionally and nationally well-known musicians, filmmakers, artists and athletes live or have lived in Chelsea, including Ian Tamblyn, Dave Leduc and Michael Woods.

== History ==
Chelsea is named after the Vermont town of its first settler, Thomas Brigham, who was a partner and son-in-law of Philemon Wright and arrived there in 1819. The name has been in use since the early 19th century: Old Chelsea (1819), Parish Saint-Stephen-of-Chelsea (1835), Chelsea (circa 1870). In 1875, the municipality was established as Hull-Partie-Ouest, or commonly referred to as West Hull. The municipality was renamed to its current name in 1990.

During World War II, the Royal Canadian Navy wanted to understand more about the propagation of radio waves and how they were affected by the earth's ionosphere so that German radio transmissions could be intercepted more efficiently. In cooperation with the National Research Council, the RCN established a "field intensity station" at Chelsea in 1941 to monitor the height of the ionosphere.

Chelsea, also known as an ionospheric observatory, was established in 1941 and closed down in 1947. It was located on the north side of Old Chelsea Road a few hundred yards west of Highway 105. The Chelsea station operated during the post-war period but in 1947, its work was transferred to the Defence Research Board's new Radio Propagation Laboratory in Ottawa. Shortly thereafter, the station was demolished. Today, there are no traces of the single shack or the many masts that were once erected on the property.

== Geography ==
Chelsea is a roughly triangle-shaped municipality that includes much of the southern and eastern parts of Gatineau Park, and is bordered on the east by the Gatineau River. The southern border is 5 kilometres (3.1 mi) south of Old Chelsea, the municipality historical centre, and runs north to the community of Farm Point. Beyond Farm Point lies the municipality of La Pêche and the village of Wakefield. North of Old Chelsea is Camp Fortune, a popular alpine ski club 15 minutes from Downtown Ottawa.

=== Communities ===
- Kingsmere
- Chelsea
- Old Chelsea
- Larrimac
- Farm Point
- Hollow Glen

== Demographics ==
Historical census populations
Year	Pop.	±%
1976	3,489	—
1981	3,546	+1.6%
1986	3,908	+10.2%
1991	5,091	+30.3%
1996	5,925	+16.4%
2001	6,036	+1.9%
2006	6,703	+11.1%
2011	6,977	+4.1%
2016	6,909	−1.0%
2021	8,000	+15.8%
Source: Statistics Canada

Canada census – Chelsea community profile

	2021	2016	2011
Population	8,000 (+15.8% from 2016)	6,909 (-1.0% from 2011)	6,977 (4.1% from 2006)
Land area	112.65 km^{2} (43.49 sq mi)	113.77 km^{2} (43.93 sq mi)	113.40 km^{2} (43.78 sq mi)
Population density	71/km^{2} (180/sq mi)	60.7/km^{2} (157/sq mi)	61.5/km^{2} (159/sq mi)
Median age	43.6 (M: 44.4, F: 42.4)	44.8 (M: 45.6, F: 44.1)	42.3 (M: 42.9, F: 41.8)
Private dwellings	3,376 (total) 3,041 (occupied)	2,898 (total)	2,956 (total)
Median household income	$146,000	$116,443	$108,629

References: 2021 2016 2011

Mother tongue:

- English as first language: 43.1%
- French as first language: 46.3%
- English and French as first language: 3.9%
- Other as first language: 5.6%

== Transportation ==
Autoroute 5, also known as the Autoroute de la Gatineau, is a major freeway that connects Chelsea and La Pêche with Gatineau and Ottawa.

Public transportation is provided to the region by Transcollines, with bus routes 921, 922, 923, 924, and 925 connecting the regional county municipality with Gatineau as of 2022. During summer weekends, the Societé de Transport de l'Outaouais provides free shuttle buses through Gatineau Park that terminate at the Gatineau Park Visitors Centre in Old Chelsea.

== Gallery ==
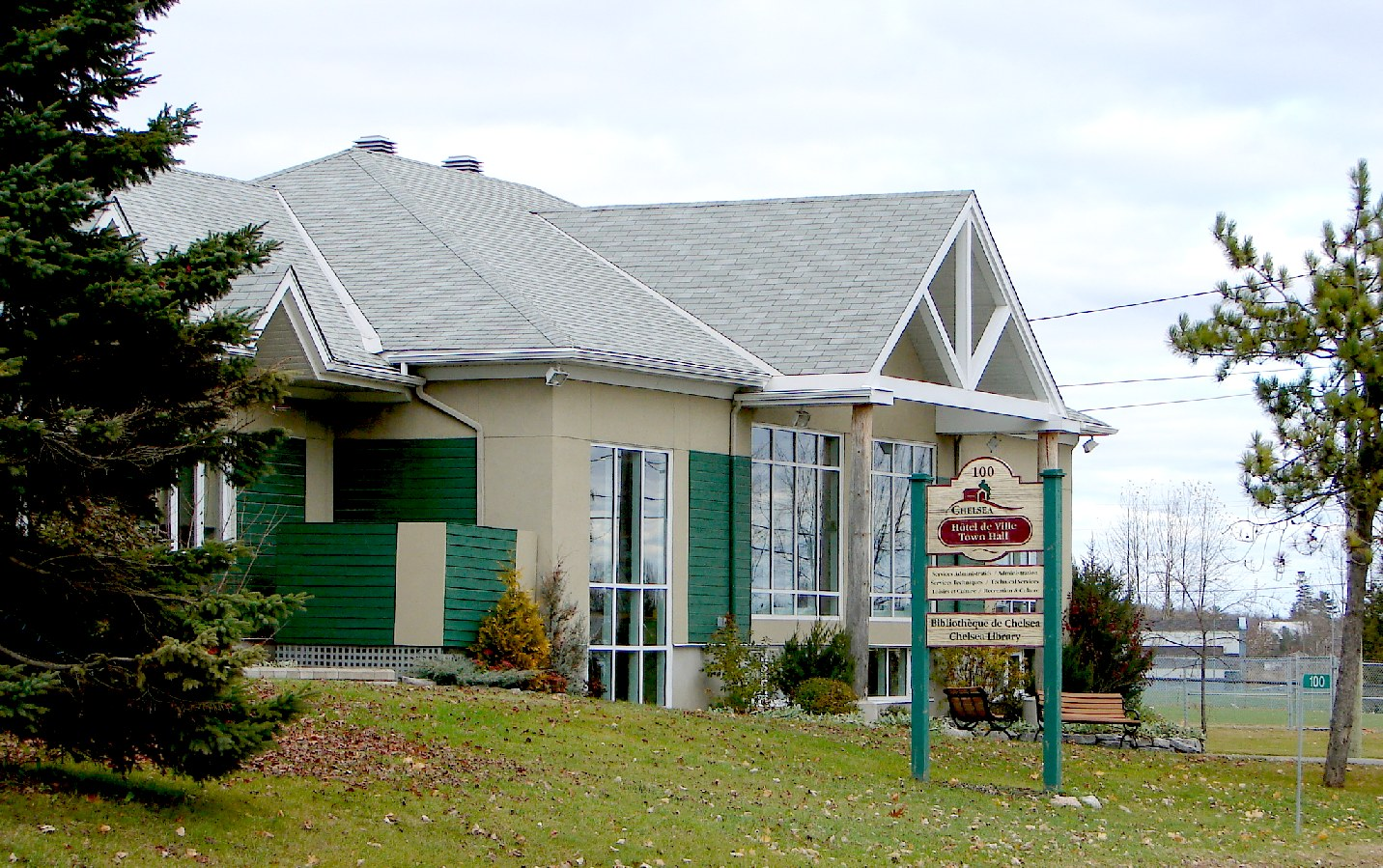
Chelsea town hall in Old Chelsea, which is also the home of the Chelsea Library's main branch.

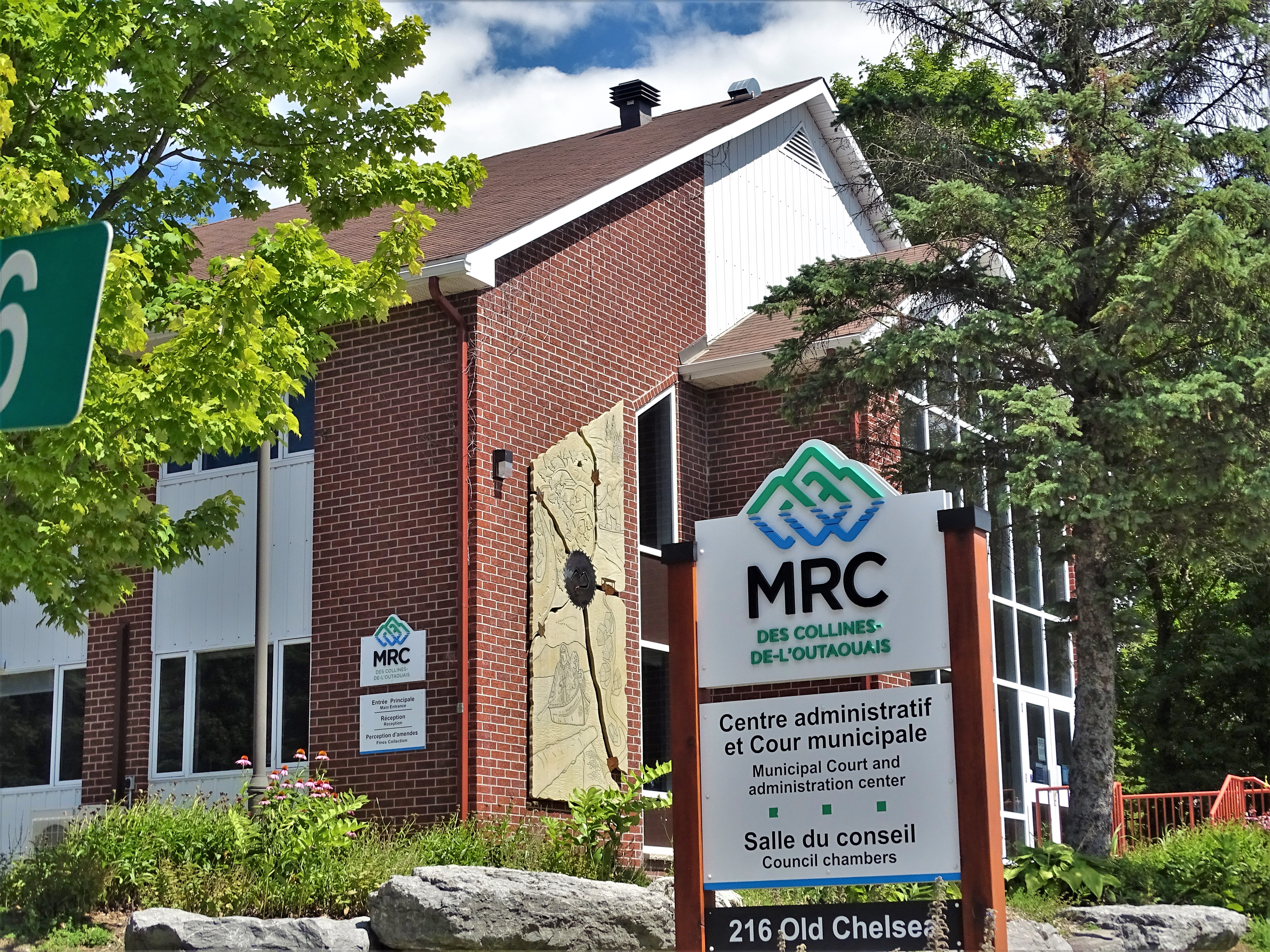
The administrative center and municipal court of Les Collines-de-l'Outaouais RCM is located in Chelsea.

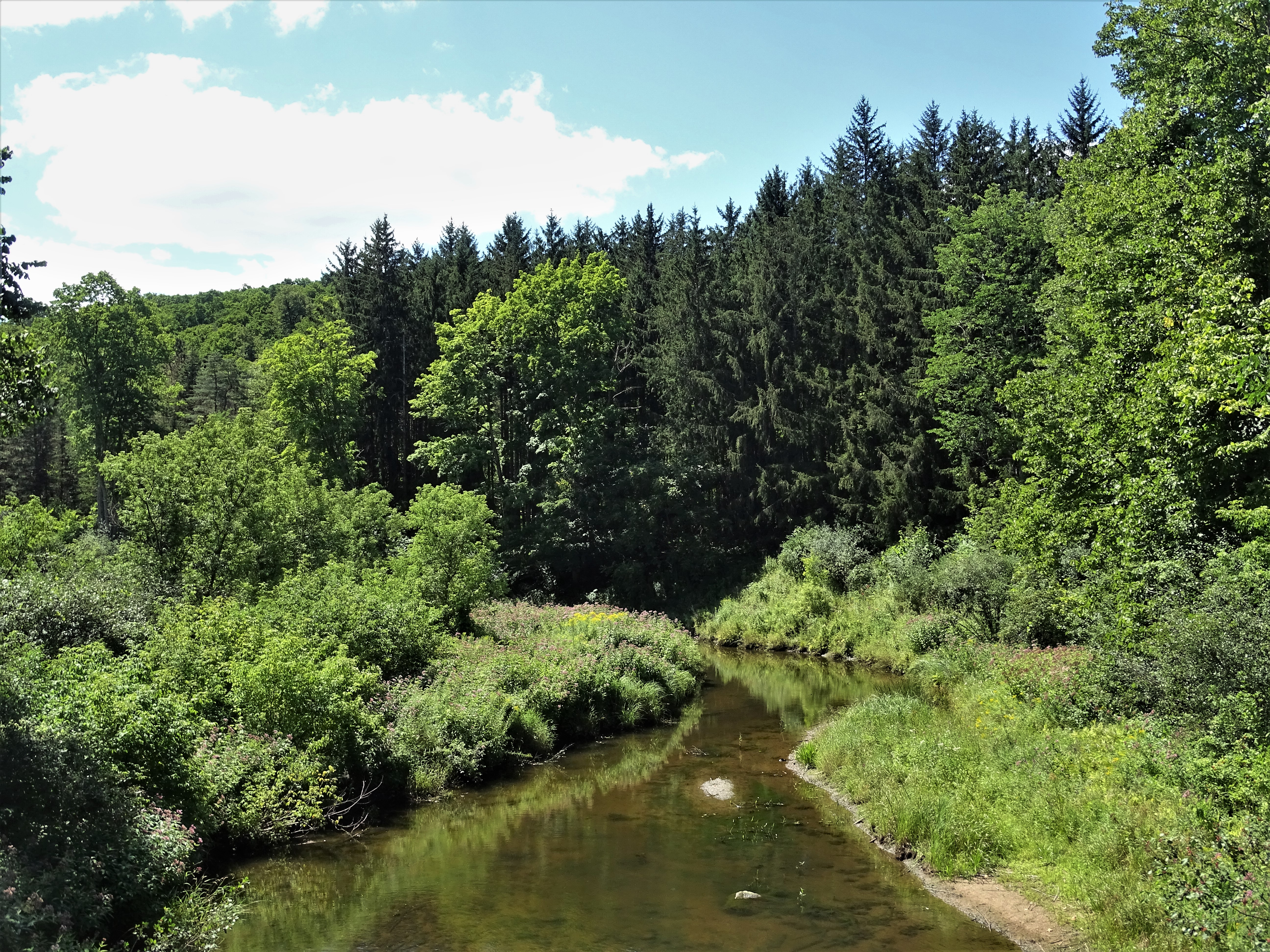
The Chelsea Creek flows southeast through Old Chelsea, eventually forming part of the southern border with Gatineau.

== See also ==
- Camp Fortune
- Chemin de fer de l'Outaouais
- Gatineau River Yacht Club
- Hull-Chelsea-Wakefield Railway
- List of anglophone communities in Quebec
- List of municipalities in Quebec
- Ryan Tower
