= Yukon Women's Curling Championship =

The Yukon Women's Curling Championship is the women's territorial championship for women's curling in the Yukon. Beginning in 2015, the event serves as a direct qualifier to the Scotties Tournament of Hearts, Canada's national women's curling championships. Prior to 2015, the event served as a qualifier for the Yukon/NWT Scotties Tournament of Hearts.

== Winners (2015–present) ==
| Event | Winning team | Winning club | City | Runner-up team | Host | Hearts rec. |
|---|---|---|---|---|---|---|
| 2026 | Bayly Scoffin, Raelyn Helston, Patty Wallingham, Bailey Horvey, Kimberly Tuor | Whitehorse Curling Club | Whitehorse | No other entries | N/A | 18th (0–8) |
| 2025 | Bayly Scoffin, Raelyn Helston, Kerry Foster, Bailey Horvey, Kimberly Tuor | Whitehorse Curling Club | Whitehorse | Patty Wallingham, Kelsey Meger, Shelby Jensen, Chelsea Jarvis, Emily Matthews | Whitehorse | 17th (1–7) |
| 2024 | Bayly Scoffin, Kerry Foster, Raelyn Helston, Kimberly Tuor, Helen Strong | Whitehorse Curling Club | Whitehorse | Patty Wallingham, Kelsey Meger, Shelby Jensen, Emily Matthews, Chelsea Jarvis | Whitehorse | 17th (1–7) |
| 2023 | Hailey Birnie, Chelsea Jarvis, Kerry Campbell, Kim Tuor, Jenna Duncan | Whitehorse Curling Club | Whitehorse | No other entries | N/A | 17th (1–7) |
| 2022 | Hailey Birnie, Kerry Campbell, Helen Strong, Kimberly Tuor, Stephanie Brown | Whitehorse Curling Club | Whitehorse | Laura Eby, Lorna Spenner, Tamar Vandenberghe, Laura Williamson | Whitehorse | T17th (0–8) |
| 2021 | Laura Eby, Lorna Spenner, Tamar Vandenberghe, Laura Williamson | Whitehorse Curling Club | Whitehorse | Patty Wallingham, Bailey Horte, Bayly Scoffin, Helen Strong, Rhonda Horte | Whitehorse | T17th (0–8) |
| 2020 | Hailey Birnie, Chelsea Duncan, Gabrielle Plonka, Kimberly Tuor | Whitehorse Curling Club | Whitehorse | No other entries | N/A | T15th (0–7) |
| 2019 | Nicole Baldwin, Hailey Birnie, Ladene Shaw, Helen Strong | Whitehorse Curling Club | Whitehorse | No other entries | N/A | 15th (1–6) |
| 2018 | Chelsea Duncan, Jenna Duncan, Kara Price, Jody Smallwood | Whitehorse Curling Club | Whitehorse | No other entries | N/A | 15th (1–7) |
| 2017 | Sarah Koltun, Chelsea Duncan, Patty Wallingham, Jenna Duncan | Whitehorse Curling Club | Whitehorse | No other entries | N/A | 14th (1–2) |
| 2016 | Nicole Baldwin, Stephanie Jackson-Baier, Rhonda Horte, Ladene Shaw | Whitehorse Curling Club | Whitehorse | Jenna Duncan, Patty Wallingham, Aline Gonçalves, Jody Smallwood | Whitehorse | 14th (1–2) |
| 2015 | Sarah Koltun, Chelsea Duncan, Patty Wallingham, Jenna Duncan | Whitehorse Curling Club | Whitehorse | No other entries | N/A | 14th (0–2) |

== Winners (2002–2014) ==
| Event | Winning team | Winning club |
|---|---|---|
| 2014 | Nicole Baldwin, Ladene Shaw, Helen Strong, Rhonda Horte | Whitehorse |
| 2013 | Not held, no entries | |
| 2012 | Not held, no entries | |
| 2011 | Nicole Baldwin, Kerry Campbell, Ladene Shaw, Lisa Abel | Whitehorse |
| 2010 | Leslie Grant, Corinne Delaire, Helen Strong, Tamar Vandenberghe | Whitehorse |
| 2009 | Helen Strong, Rhonda Horte, Sandra Mikkelsen, Jaime Hewitt (skip) | Whitehorse |
| 2008 | Leslie Grant, Corinne Delaire, Tamar Vandenberge, Frances Taylor | |
| 2007 | Nicole Baldwin, Rhonda Horte, Helen Strong, Ladene Shaw | |
| 2006 | Nicole Baldwin, Sandra Mikkelsen, Rhonda Horte, Helen Strong | |
| 2005 | Sandra Mikkelsen, Rhonda Horte, Carrie Stahl, Helen Strong | |
| 2004 | Nicole Baldwin, Jamie Milward, Lindsay Moffatt, Kelly Keating | |
| 2003 | Nicole Baldwin, Jamie Milward, Lindsay Moffatt, Kelly Keating | |
| 2002 | Not held, only two entries (Donna Scott and Margaret Lea Philipps) | |
