= 2016 Yukon Scotties Tournament of Hearts =

The 2016 Yukon Scotties Tournament of Hearts was held January 16–17 in Whitehorse. The winning Nicole Baldwin rink represented Yukon at the 2016 Scotties Tournament of Hearts in Grande Prairie, Alberta.

The 2016 Yukon Scotties was the first territorial women's championship to be held with a direct berth to the national championships, as the 2015 event was cancelled due to there being just one entry. All three of Canada's territories were given direct entries in 2015.

The event was a best of three tournament between the Nicole Baldwin and Jenna Duncan rinks. Baldwin won the event, winning two of the three matches.

== Teams ==
Skip	Third	Second	Lead	Alternate
Nicole Baldwin	Stephanie Jackson-Baier	Rhonda Horte	Ladene Shaw	Sandra Mikkelsen
Jenna Duncan	Patty Wallingham	Aline Gonçalves	Jody Smallwood	

== Scores ==
=== Game #1 ===
January 16, 10:00 am

Sheet 5	Final
Jenna Duncan	9
Nicole Baldwin	6

=== Game #2 ===
January 16, 4:00 pm

Sheet 4	Final
Jenna Duncan	8
Nicole Baldwin	9

=== Game #3 ===
January 17, 10:00 am

Sheet 3	Final
Jenna Duncan	6
Nicole Baldwin	11
