= Bayly Scoffin =

Canadian curler (born 2002)

- Curler
- Born: June 24, 2002 (age 24); Whitehorse, Yukon

Team
- Curling club: Whitehorse CC, Whitehorse, YT
- Skip: Bayly Scoffin
- Third: Raelyn Helston
- Second: Patty Wallingham
- Lead: Bailey Horvey
- Alternate: Shelby Jensen

Curling career
- Member Association: Yukon
- Hearts: 3 (2024, 2025, 2026)
- Top CTRS ranking: 106th (2024–25)

Bayly Scoffin (born June 24, 2002) is a Canadian curler from Whitehorse, Yukon. She currently skips her own team and is a three-time reigning Yukon women's champion.

== Career ==
=== Juniors ===
Scoffin made her first national appearance at just 12 years old, playing third on the Yukon rink at the 2015 Canada Winter Games. Playing for skip Alyssa Meger, the team finished in last place with an 0–8 record. Her next appearance would come three years later when she skipped her own team at the 2018 Canadian U18 Curling Championships, again finishing at the bottom of the standings. In 2020, she made her first junior appearance at the 2020 Canadian Junior Curling Championships, however, again finished winless.

In 2022, Scoffin picked up her first win at a national championship, defeating British Columbia 11–5 in Draw 8 of the 2022 Canadian Junior Curling Championships. In her final season of juniors in 2023, she also won one game, 13–5 over Quebec. 2023 also saw Scoffin compete in her second Canada Winter Games in the mixed doubles discipline with Nicolas Fecteau. There, the team finished in eleventh after winning their final seeding pool game over the Northwest Territories.

Aside from junior competitions, Scoffin also represented the Southern Alberta Institute of Technology at three CCAA/Curling Canada College Curling Championships. The team's best finish came in 2024 where as third for Kayleigh Shannon, the SAIT Trojans finished first in the round robin with a 6–1 record. They then beat Augustana University College in the semifinal before coming up short in the final to Concordia University of Edmonton.

=== Women's ===
Aged out of juniors, Scoffin formed a women's team with Kerry Foster, Raelyn Helston and Kimberly Tuor to compete to represent the Yukon at the Scotties Tournament of Hearts. At the territorial championship, the team finished in first place through the double round-robin with a 3–1 record. They then beat Patty Wallingham in the playoff to earn a spot at the 2024 Scotties Tournament of Hearts in Calgary, Alberta. As Scotties rookies, the team struggled early in the week but ended on a high note by picking up their lone win 11–4 over New Brunswick's Melissa Adams in the final round robin draw.

The following year, Team Scoffin again beat Patty Wallingham in the 2025 Yukon Scotties Tournament of Hearts, this time three games to one in the best-of-five series. At the 2025 Scotties Tournament of Hearts, the team scored a huge upset in their first game of the event, knocking off the fourth seeded Nova Scotia's Christina Black 9–8. This would be their only win of the event as they went on to lose the rest of their games. In 2026, they were the only team to register for the territorial championship, automatically receiving a berth to the 2026 Scotties Tournament of Hearts.

=== Mixed doubles ===
In 2021, Scoffin competed in the 2021 Canadian Mixed Doubles Curling Championship alongside her father Wade. The duo finished 0–6 in the round robin, however, had a close game with previous Canadian champions Kim and Wayne Tuck, losing 7–6 on last rock.

== Personal life ==
Scoffin is currently a business administration student at the Southern Alberta Institute of Technology. Her brother Thomas Scoffin is a seven-time Yukon men's champion while her father Wade is also a curler and previous coach.

== Teams ==
Season	Skip	Third	Second	Lead
2014–15	Alyssa Meger	Bayly Scoffin	Peyton L'Henaff	Karen Smallwood
2017–18	Bayly Scoffin	Karen Smallwood	Robyn McNeil	Alexa Smallwood
2019–20	Bayly Scoffin	Neizha Snider	Taylor Legge	Dannika Mikkelsen
2020–21	Patty Wallingham	Bailey Horte	Bayly Scoffin	Helen Strong
2021–22	Bayly Scoffin	Neizha Snider	Taylor Legge	Dannika Mikkelsen
2022–23	Bayly Scoffin	Taylor Legge	Dannika Mikkelsen	Neizha Snider
2023–24	Bayly Scoffin	Kerry Foster	Raelyn Helston	Kimberly Tuor
2024–25	Bayly Scoffin	Raelyn Helston	Kerry Foster	Bailey Horte
2025–26	Bayly Scoffin	Raelyn Helston	Patty Wallingham	Bailey Horvey
