= Wakefield Documentary Film Festival =

The Wakefield Documentary Film Festival is an annual film festival in Wakefield, Quebec, which stages a program of documentary films. The festival is staged each February at the Wakefield Centre, screening films every weekend throughout the month.

In conjunction with a 2018 screening of the documentary film California Typewriter, Ottawa resident Stephen Hendrie hosted an exhibition of his own collection of vintage typewriters.
