= Maclaren Cemetery =

Cemetery in Wakefield, Outaouais Region, Quebec, Canada

Coordinates: 45.6371°N 75.9383°W

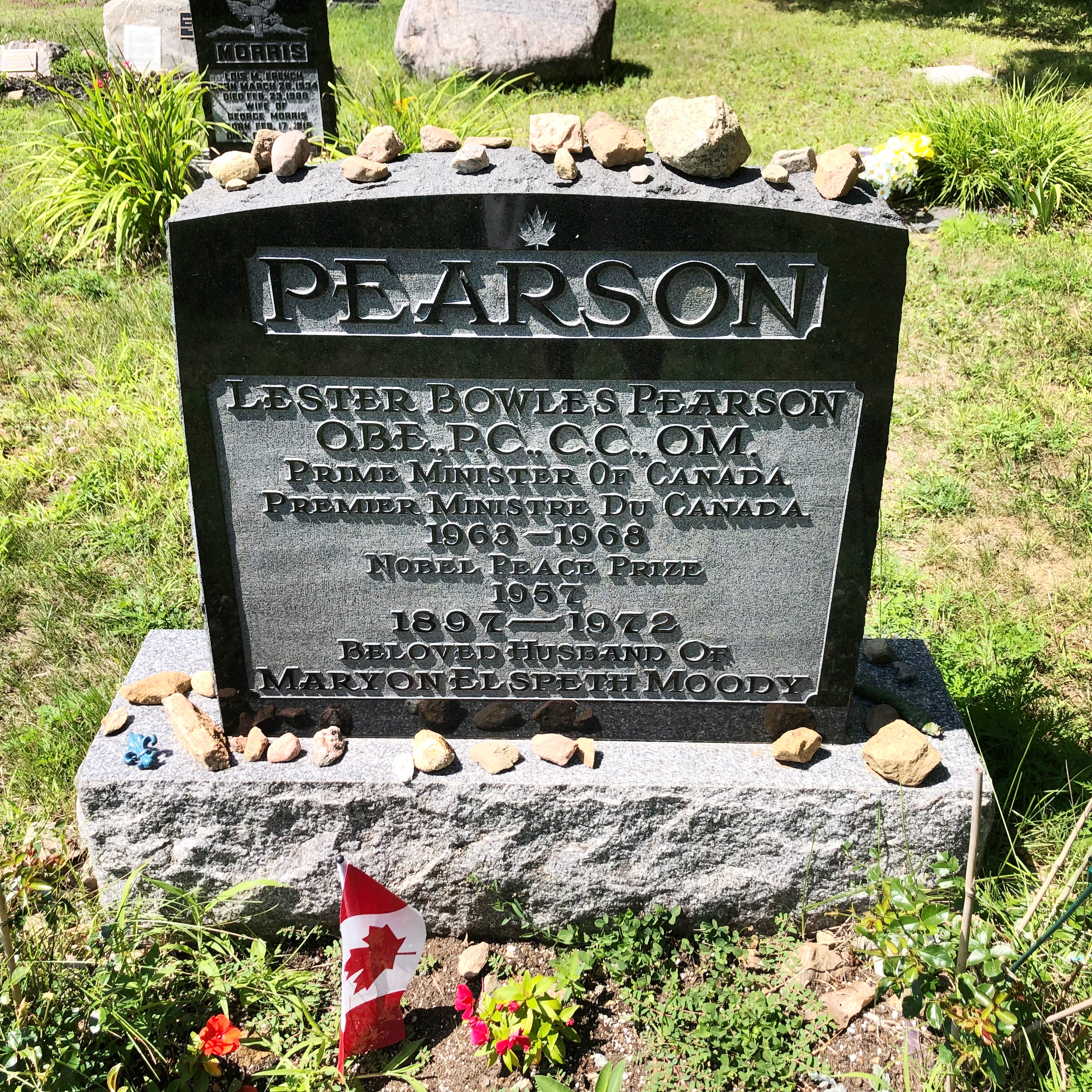
Gravestone of Lester B. Pearson

Maclaren Cemetery is a small cemetery in the town of Wakefield, Quebec and the final resting place for Prime Minister Lester B. Pearson. Established near the 1870s, the cemetery is located in the clearing below the hills bordering the Gatineau River and is the resting place for Scottish settlers in the area.

== Notable residents ==
Notable persons interred here include:

- David Maclaren – Settler and namesake of the cemetery
- Malak Karsh (1915–2001) – Canadian photographer.
- Ian Kerr (1965–2019) – Law professor and privacy expert.
- Geoffrey Pearson (1927–2008) – Diplomat and son of Lester B. Pearson.
- Lester B. Pearson (1897–1972) – 14th Prime Minister of Canada and Nobel Peace Prize winner.
- Norman Robertson (1904–1968) – Diplomat and friend of Pearson and Wrong.
- Humphrey Hume Wrong (1894–1954) – Diplomat and friend of Pearson and Robertson.
- Laurier LaPierre (1929-2012) – Senator, professor, broadcaster, journalist and author. Humphrey Hume Wrong was his ex-wife's uncle.
