= 1904 in rail transport =

This article lists events related to rail transport that occurred in 1904.

== Events ==
=== February events ===
- February 8 – Service begins on Canadian Pacific Railway's Maniwaki line between Hull, Québec, and Maniwaki, Québec.

=== March events ===
- March 8 – The Southern Pacific Railroad opens the Lucin Cutoff across the Great Salt Lake, bypassing Promontory, Utah, for the railroad's mainline.
- March 12 – Surface electric trains begin running from Liverpool to Southport on the Lancashire and Yorkshire Railway in the north of England.
- March 20 – The Southern Pacific Railroad completes the Coast Line between Los Angeles and Santa Barbara, CA.

=== May events ===
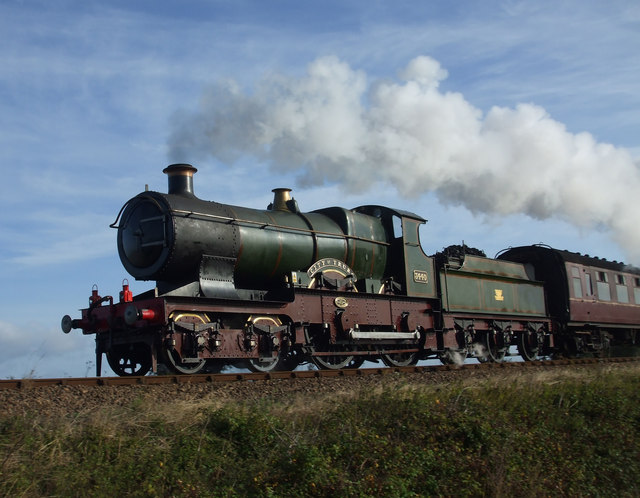
City of Truro

- May 9 – Great Western Railway locomotive number 3440, City of Truro, becomes the first steam locomotive in Europe to travel at a generally recognised speed of over 100 mph (160 km/h) when it hauls an Ocean Mails special from Plymouth to London Paddington.
- May 18 – New Haven Railroad reorganizes its subsidiary streetcar lines as the Consolidated Railway.
- May 25 – New Haven Railroad acquires control of Worcester and Southbridge Street Railway.

=== July events ===
- July 1 – The Great Western Railway of England introduces the express train between London Paddington and Penzance in Cornwall which becomes known as the Cornish Riviera Express.
- July 10 – Albula Railway in Switzerland opens throughout for passengers from Thusis to St. Moritz.
- July 21 – The Trans-Siberian Railway is completed.
- July 30 – New York, New Haven and Hartford Railroad acquires control of New London Street Railway.
- July 31 – The Stubaitalbahn, a metre gauge interurban at Innsbruck in Austria becomes the first to operate commercially on single-phase electric power when it is electrified at 2500 V 42 Hz.

=== August events ===
- August 7 – Eden train wreck in Colorado: a bridge is washed away by a flash flood as a train crosses, resulting in at least 88 deaths.
- August 15 – The Grand Trunk Railway and Canadian Atlantic Railway sign an agreement that will place the Canadian Atlantic under Grand Trunk's control.

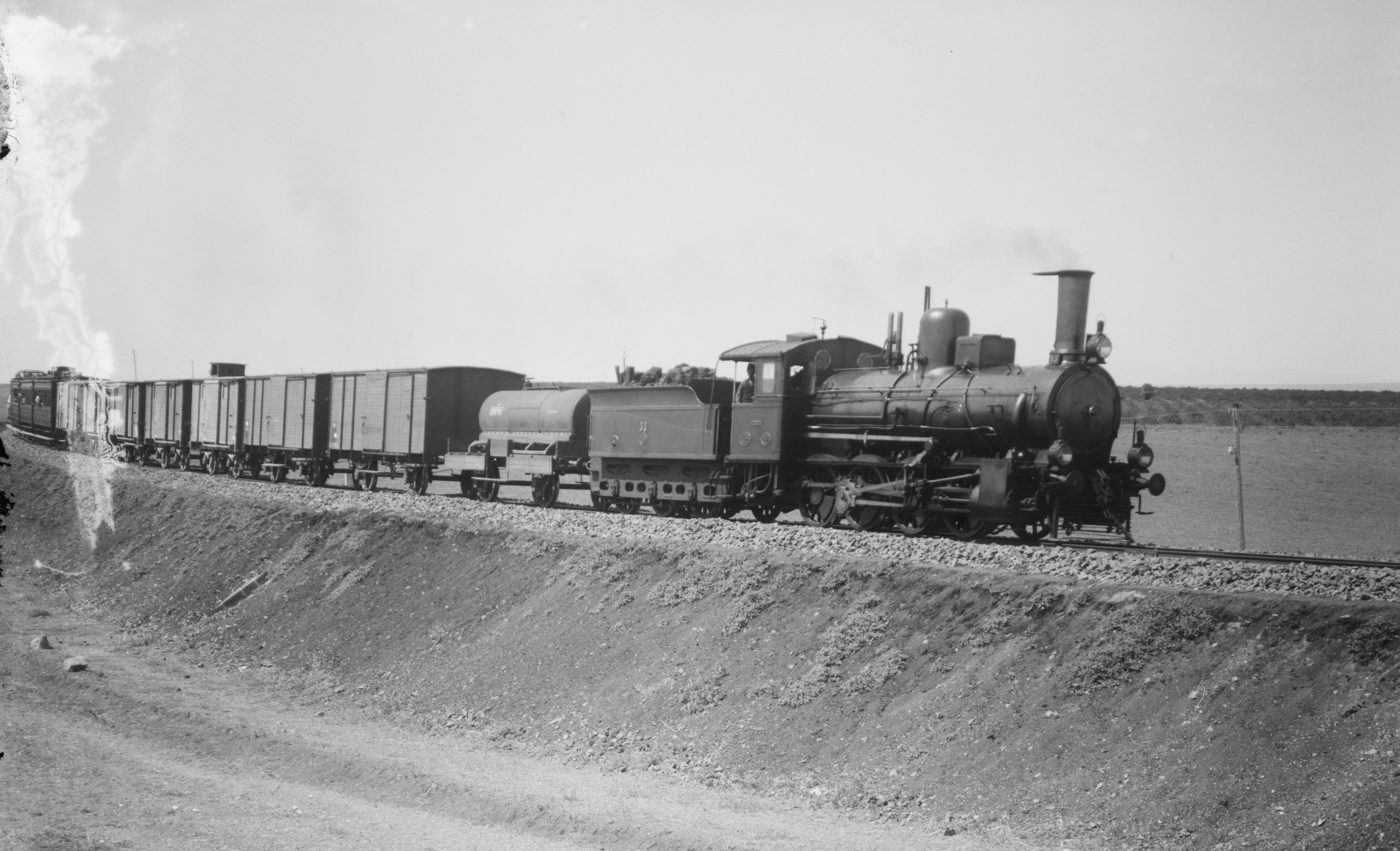
Baghdad Railway

- August 25 – The New Long Railroad Bridge across the Potomac River in Washington, D.C., opens.

=== September events ===
- September 12 – Indianapolis Traction Terminal opens, the largest interurban terminal in the world.
- September 24 – New Market train wreck in Tennessee: two trains collide head-on at speed, resulting in at least 56 deaths.
- September 29 – New Haven Railroad completes the property acquisition of New London Street Railway.

=== October events ===
- October 25 – The first 200 km (120 mi) section of the Baghdad Railway opens.

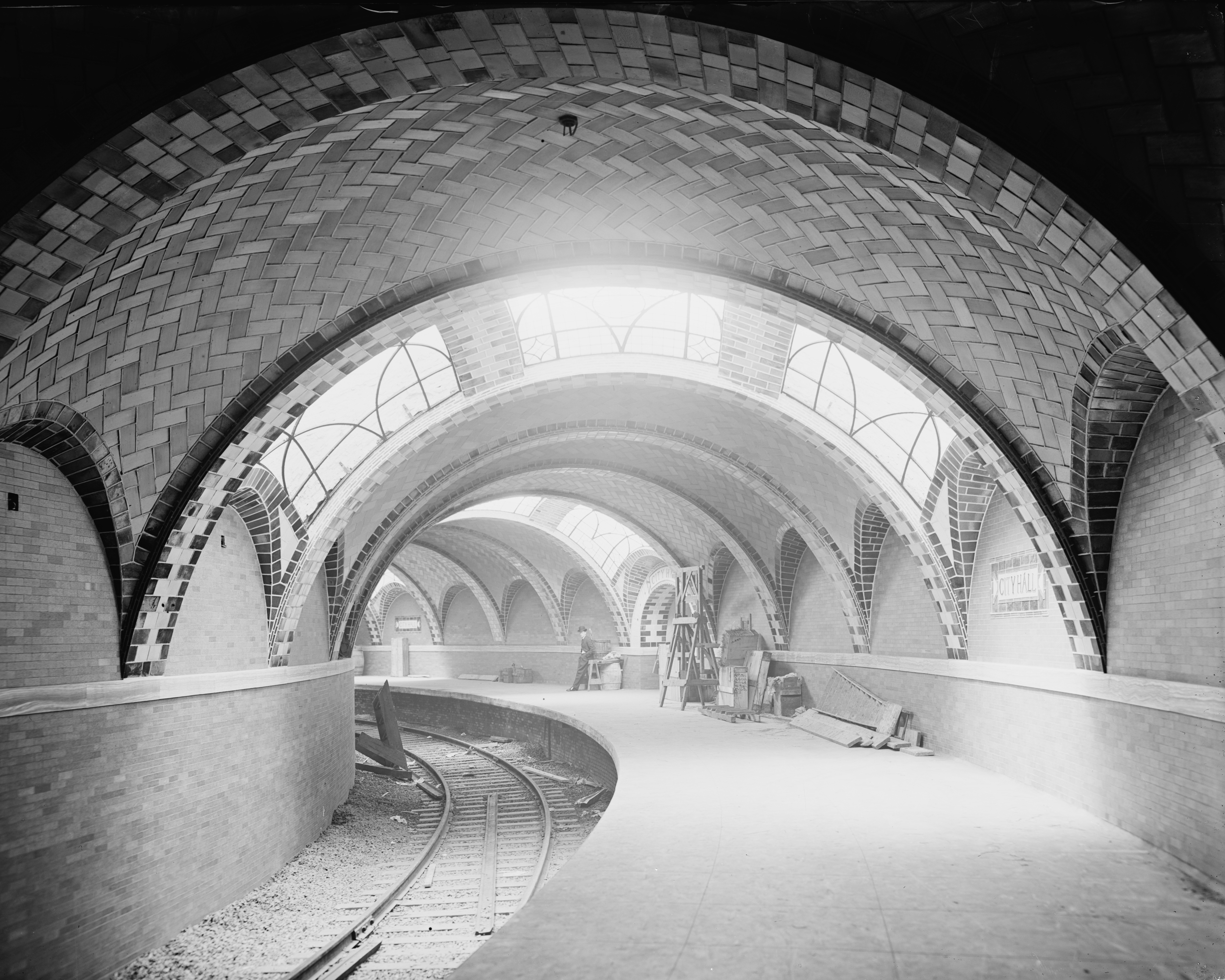
City Hall (IRT station)

- October 27 – The first underground line of the New York City Subway opens, operated by the Interborough Rapid Transit Company between City Hall and 145th Street at Broadway. The car fleet available includes the first production all-steel passenger cars in the world from an order of 300 placed with American Car and Foundry. It is fed from the IRT Powerhouse.

=== December events ===
- December 1 – Mount Washington Transit Tunnel opens for use by Pittsburgh Railways.
- December 31 – Rail line from Kerma to Wadi Halfa in Sudan officially abandoned.

=== Unknown date events ===
- The Tidewater Railway is chartered in Virginia.
- American Locomotive Company purchases the Locomotive and Machine Company of Montreal, Quebec, Canada, which soon becomes Montreal Locomotive Works.
- First Mallet locomotive built in the United States, Baltimore and Ohio Railroad Class O 0-6-6-0 helper #2400, by Alco.
- The Federal government of the United States purchases the Panama Railway from the French canal company Compagnie Universelle du Canal Interocéanique.
- Lucius E. Johnson succeeds Frederick J. Kimball as president of the Norfolk and Western Railroad.
- American Car and Foundry acquires Southern Car and Foundry of Memphis, Tennessee.
- The Seebach-Wettingen Railway in Switzerland becomes the first to put into service a locomotive operating on high voltage alternating current single-phase electric power, at 15,000 V, 15 Hz.
- 2 ft (600 mm) gauge Hornos Railroad (Ferrocarril de Hornos) begins service for Coahuila's Hacienda de Hornos.
- Laconia Car Company completes the last passenger car commercially manufactured for Maine narrow gauge railroads.

== Births ==
=== July births ===
- July 30 – Buck Crump, president of Canadian Pacific Railway Limited 1955–1964 and 1966 (died 1989).

== Deaths ==
=== April deaths ===
- April 16 – Samuel Smiles, British engineering biographer and railway manager (born 1812).

=== October deaths ===
- October 4 – Henry C. Payne, president of Milwaukee and Northern Railroad, The Milwaukee Electric Railway and Light Company and the Milwaukee and Cream City Traction Company, and receiver for Northern Pacific Railway in 1893 (born 1843).

=== November deaths ===
- November 7 - R. J. Billinton, Locomotive, Carriage, Wagon and Marine Superintendent of the London, Brighton and South Coast Railway 1890–1904, dies (b. 1844).
