= Hornos Railroad =

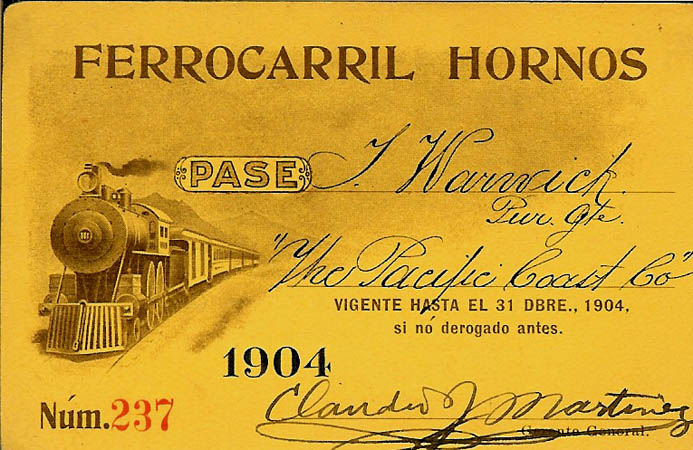
Annual ticket, 1904

Hornos Railroad (Ferrocarril de Hornos) was a 2 ft (610 mm) narrow gauge railway owned by Hacienda de Hornos in Mexico. Hacienda de Hornos was a large grain and cattle ranch in southwestern Coahuila near Torreón.

The line extended 51 kilometres (32 mi) from an interchange with the Mexican International Railway at Hornos through Hacienda de Hornos to Alamito with a 4-kilometre (2.5 mi) branch to interchange with the Ferrocarril Coahuila y Pacifico at Viesca.

Construction began at Hornos in 1902, and the line began common-carrier freight and passenger service in 1904 with two daily trains in each direction between Hornos and Viesca. Twenty-ton locomotive #4 was the only 2 ft (610 mm) narrow gauge 2-8-2 ever built for North American service.

The railroad was damaged by the Mexican Revolution in 1914; and the last public timetable was published in 1930 for a single daily mixed train with no service to Alamito.

The line disappeared from government records after 1945.

== Locomotives ==
Number	Builder	Type	Date	Works number	Notes
1	H. K. Porter, Inc	0-6-0T			furnished by the contractor
2	Baldwin Locomotive Works	2-4-0	8/1902	20871	named Adela
3	Baldwin Locomotive Works	2-6-0	3/1903	21823	named Concepcion sold 9/1909 to Godchaux Sugar Company as Elm Hall and Foley Railroad #7
4	Baldwin Locomotive Works	2-8-2	3/1903	21825	named Juana
