= Wakefield, Quebec =

Village in Quebec

Coordinates: 45.633°N 75.933°W

Wakefield is one of many villages of the municipality of La Pêche, with the village centre on the western shore of the Gatineau River, at the confluence of the La Pêche River in the Outaouais region of the province of Quebec in Canada. It is thirty-five kilometres northwest of Ottawa, Ontario. The village, named after the city of Wakefield in West Yorkshire, England, is now the southern edge of the municipality of La Pêche, and was founded in 1830 by Irish, Scottish, and English immigrants. Wakefield is approximately a twenty-five-minute drive north of the Macdonald-Cartier Bridge that divides Gatineau and Ottawa (Ontario), along the Autoroute 5, a modern four lane divided highway which has recently been extended to the village. Wakefield is unique as a primarily Anglophone town in a primarily Francophone province.

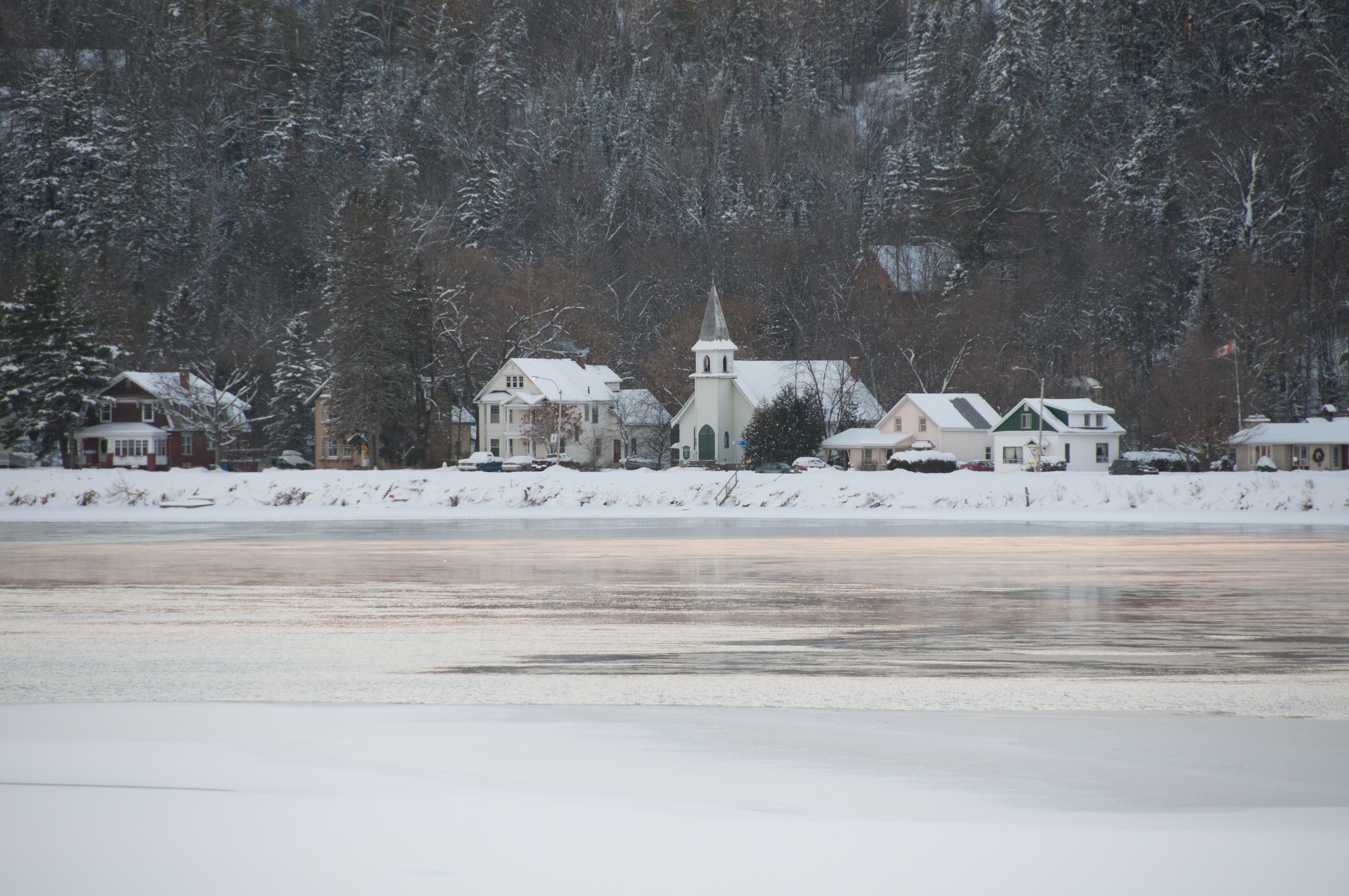
Wakefield in winter

== History ==
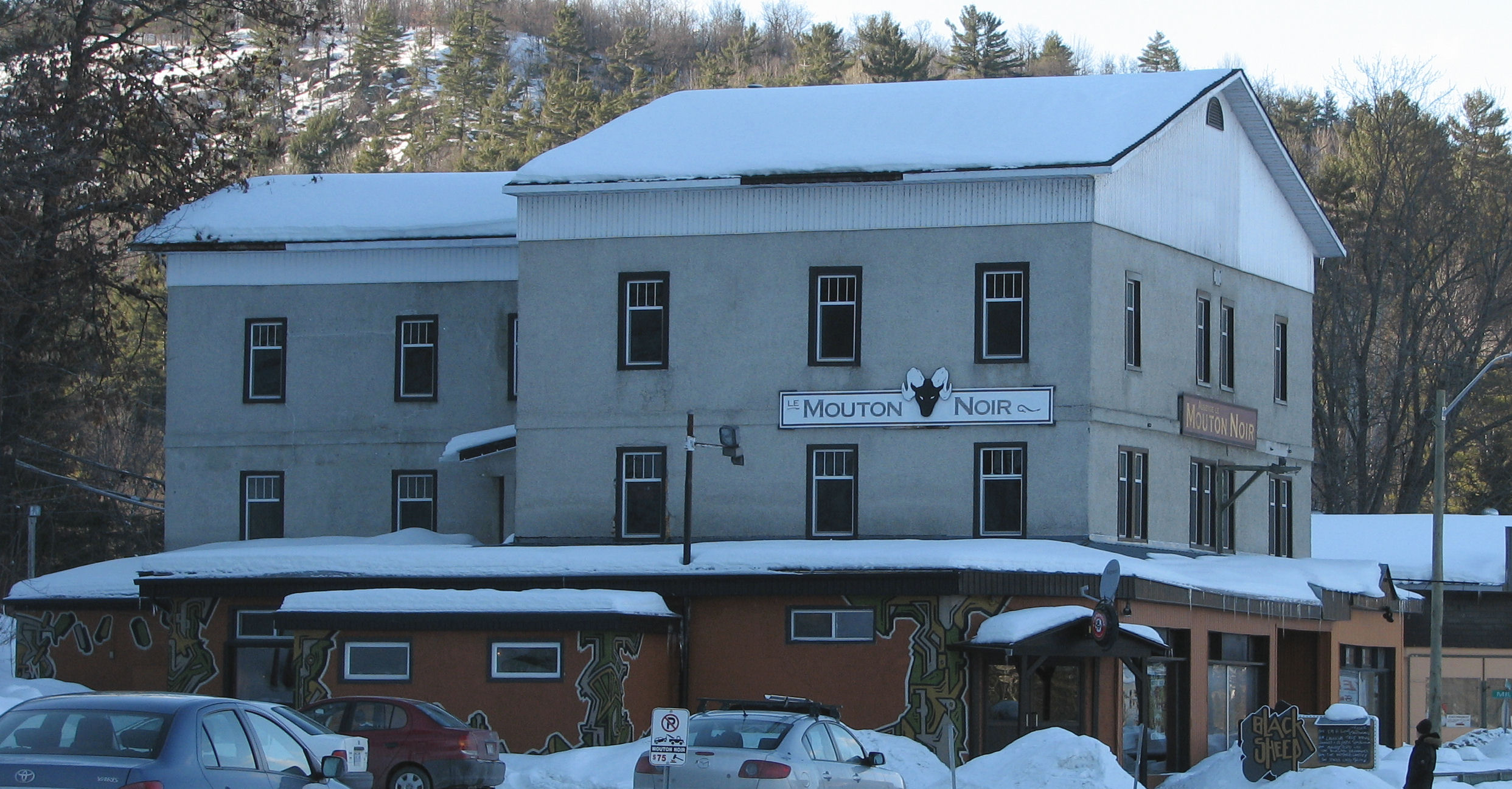
Black Sheep Inn / Le Mouton Noir

The village's primary industry is tourism. Attractions in the region include the Gendron covered bridge spanning the Gatineau River; the Wakefield Documentary Film Festival; the Black Sheep Inn (Auberge Mouton Noir), a legendary live music venue; The Wakefield Mill Hotel and Spa, a 4-star hotel, restaurant and spa with views of the Maclaren Falls, and Eco-Odyssee, a navigable water maze.

The village provides access points to Gatineau Park near the junction of Route Principale and Highway 5, and also at the Wakefield Mill. During the summer months until 2011, a tourist steam train ran daily from Gatineau to Wakefield via Chelsea along the Gatineau River.

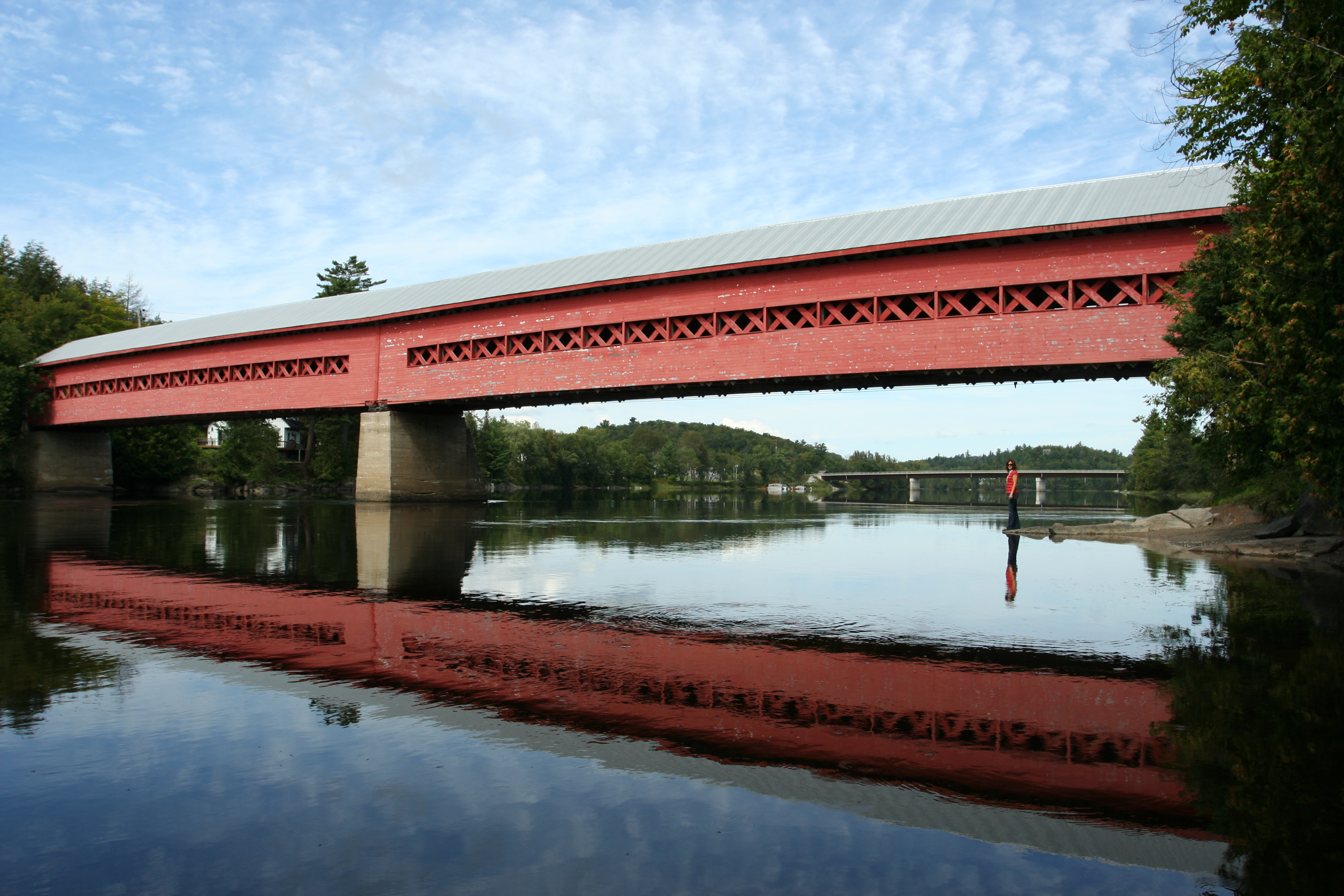
Covered bridge

Recreational activities in and around the village include horseback riding, skiing, snowboarding, snowshoeing, tubing, snowmobiling, dog sledding, golf, canoeing, and kayaking. There is an unsupervised and unofficial swimming area beneath the covered bridge that attracts thousands of people from the surrounding area every summer.

The Wakefield community has a "thriving arts scene".

Grey Owl was partially filmed here in 1999.

Since 2011 the village has hosted the Wakefield Covered Bridge Run. The Marathon of Health along with the Wakefield community created the running event to raise money for organizations that promote healthy and active lifestyles through sports.

The village has developed a reputation for a somewhat bohemian lifestyle and boasts a number of small cafes, pubs, cheese-stoops, and galleries. Many young families live in the area, enjoying its lifestyle, services, and resources. Many artists live in the surrounding mountains and valleys.

Public buildings include the Wakefield Memorial Hospital, an elementary school, the MRC des Collines Police Station, the Daycare Centre Éveil de la nature, the Wakefield Retirement Home, and a municipal library. A weekly regional newspaper, The Low Down to Hull and Back News (a play on the Gatineau River communities from Low downstream to Hull), is also published in the village.

Former Canadian Prime Minister Lester B. Pearson is buried in Maclaren Cemetery in Wakefield.

== See also ==
- Chemin de fer de l'Outaouais
- Hull-Chelsea-Wakefield Railway
- List of former municipalities in Quebec
