= 2014 Canadian Junior Curling Championships – Women's tournament =

2014 Canadian Junior Curling Championships Women's tournament
- Host city: Liverpool, Nova Scotia
- Arena: Queens Place Emera Centre; Liverpool Curling Club
- Dates: January 18–26
- Winner: Alberta
- Curling club: Saville Sports Centre, Edmonton
- Skip: Kelsey Rocque
- Third: Keely Brown
- Second: Taylor McDonald
- Lead: Claire Tully
- Finalist: British Columbia (Kalia Van Osch)

The women's tournament of the 2014 M&M Meat Shops Canadian Junior Curling Championships was held from January 18 to 26 at the Queens Place Emera Centre and the Liverpool Curling Club.

== Teams ==
The teams are listed as follows:

Province	Skip	Third	Second	Lead	Club(s)
Alberta	Kelsey Rocque	Keely Brown	Taylor McDonald	Claire Tully	Saville SC, Edmonton
British Columbia	Kalia Van Osch	Marika Van Osch	Sarah Daniels	Ashley Sanderson	Nanaimo CC, Nanaimo; Delta CC, Delta; Royal City CC, New Westminster
Manitoba	Meaghan Brezden	Abby Ackland	Danielle Lafleur	Nikki Boulet	Granite CC, Winnipeg
New Brunswick	Jessica Daigle	Cathlia Ward	Natalie Menzies	Katie Forward	Capital WC, Fredericton
Newfoundland and Labrador	Sarah Hill	Danielle Wiseman	Sarah Ford	Heidi Trickett	Re/Max Centre, St. John's
Northwest Territories	Carina McKay-Saturnino	Karly King-Simpson	Hilary Charlie	Rayna Vittrekwa	Inuvik CC, Inuvik
Northern Ontario	Krysta Burns	Leah Hodgson	Sara Guy	Laura Masters	Idylwylde G&CC, Sudbury
Nova Scotia	Mary Fay	Jenn Smith	Karlee Burgess	Janique LeBlanc	Chester CC, Chester
Nunavut	Sadie Pinksen	Christianne West	Katie Chislett-Manning	Emily-Grace Matthews	Iqaluit CC, Iqaluit
Ontario	Molly Greenwood	Amy Heitzner	Carly Van Daele	Emma Malfara	K-W Granite, Waterloo
Prince Edward Island	Veronica Smith	Chloe McCloskey	Sabrina Smith	Katie Fullerton	Cornwall CC, Cornwall
Saskatchewan	Kristen Streifel	Elyse Lafrance	Ashley Skjerdal	Karlee Korchinski	Nutana CC, Saskatoon
Quebec	Camille Boisvert	Sarah Dumais	Myriam Arsenault	Nancy Rochon	CC Etchemin, St-Romuald
Yukon	Sarah Koltun	Patty Wallingham	Jenna Duncan	Andrea Sinclair	Whitehorse CC, Whitehorse

== Round-robin standings ==
Final Standings

Key
Teams to Championship Pool
Teams to Tiebreaker

Pool A	Skip	W	L
Alberta	Kelsey Rocque	6	0
British Columbia	Kalia Van Osch	4	2
Saskatchewan	Kristen Streifel	3	3
Quebec	Camille Boisvert	3	3
Yukon	Sarah Koltun	3	3
Northwest Territories	Carina McKay-Saturnino	2	4
Nunavut	Sadie Pinksen	0	6

Pool B	Skip	W	L
Ontario	Molly Greenwood	5	1
Nova Scotia	Mary Fay	5	1
New Brunswick	Jessica Daigle	3	3
Manitoba	Meaghan Brezden	3	3
Northern Ontario	Krysta Burns	2	4
Prince Edward Island	Veronica Smith	2	4
Newfoundland and Labrador	Sarah Hill	1	5

== Round-robin results ==
All draw times are listed in Atlantic Standard Time (UTC−4).

=== Pool A ===
==== Draw 1 ====
Saturday, January 18, 9:30 am

Sheet G	1	2	3	4	5	6	7	8	9	10	Final
Saskatchewan (Streifel)	0	0	2	1	3	0	2	2	X	X	10
Yukon (Koltun) 🔨	1	0	0	0	0	1	0	0	X	X	2

==== Draw 2 ====
Saturday, January 18, 2:00 pm

Sheet A	1	2	3	4	5	6	7	8	9	10	Final
Nunavut (Pinksen) 🔨	0	0	0	0	0	0	0	0	X	X	0
British Columbia (Van Osch)	3	5	3	1	1	1	3	2	X	X	19

Sheet C	1	2	3	4	5	6	7	8	9	10	Final
Quebec (Boisvert) 🔨	0	1	0	1	0	1	0	0	1	X	4
Alberta (Rocque)	0	0	1	0	1	0	2	2	0	X	6

==== Draw 3 ====
Saturday, January 18, 7:30 pm

Sheet A	1	2	3	4	5	6	7	8	9	10	Final
Northwest Territories (McKay-Saturnino)	1	1	0	2	0	3	0	0	0	2	9
Saskatchewan (Streifel) 🔨	0	0	1	0	1	0	3	2	0	0	7

Sheet C	1	2	3	4	5	6	7	8	9	10	Final
Yukon (Koltun)	1	1	0	3	0	4	3	3	X	X	15
Nunavut (Pinksen) 🔨	0	0	1	0	1	0	0	0	X	X	2

Sheet G	1	2	3	4	5	6	7	8	9	10	Final
Quebec (Boisvert) 🔨	0	0	1	0	1	0	0	1	0	X	3
British Columbia (Van Osch)	0	0	0	0	0	2	1	0	3	X	6

==== Draw 4 ====
Sunday, January 19, 9:30 am

Sheet G	1	2	3	4	5	6	7	8	9	10	Final
Northwest Territories (McKay-Saturnino) 🔨	1	0	1	1	0	3	1	0	1	0	8
Nunavut (Pinksen)	0	0	0	0	1	0	0	2	0	0	3

==== Draw 5 ====
Sunday, January 19, 2:00 pm

Sheet A	1	2	3	4	5	6	7	8	9	10	Final
Yukon (Koltun)	1	0	0	0	1	1	0	0	1	X	4
Quebec (Boisvert) 🔨	0	2	2	1	0	0	1	1	0	X	7

Sheet D	1	2	3	4	5	6	7	8	9	10	Final
Alberta (Rocque) 🔨	0	1	1	0	0	2	0	2	0	X	6
British Columbia (Van Osch)	0	0	0	1	1	0	1	0	1	X	4

==== Draw 6 ====
Sunday, January 19, 6:30 pm

Sheet B	1	2	3	4	5	6	7	8	9	10	Final
Alberta (Rocque)	3	3	1	0	2	0	4	2	X	X	15
Nunavut (Pinksen) 🔨	0	0	0	1	0	1	0	0	X	X	2

Sheet D	1	2	3	4	5	6	7	8	9	10	Final
Northwest Territories (McKay-Saturnino)	0	1	0	3	0	1	0	0	0	X	5
Yukon (Koltun) 🔨	2	0	1	0	2	0	0	3	2	X	10

Sheet F	1	2	3	4	5	6	7	8	9	10	Final
British Columbia (Van Osch)	0	3	0	4	0	4	0	2	X	X	13
Saskatchewan (Streifel) 🔨	1	0	1	0	1	0	2	0	X	X	5

==== Draw 8 ====
Monday, January 20, 2:00 pm

Sheet B	1	2	3	4	5	6	7	8	9	10	Final
Nunavut (Pinksen)	0	0	0	0	1	0	2	0	0	X	3
Saskatchewan (Streifel) 🔨	0	3	1	1	0	2	0	3	2	X	12

Sheet F	1	2	3	4	5	6	7	8	9	10	Final
Quebec (Boisvert) 🔨	2	1	0	1	2	1	1	0	X	X	8
Northwest Territories (McKay-Saturnino)	0	0	1	0	0	0	0	2	X	X	3

Sheet H	1	2	3	4	5	6	7	8	9	10	Final
Yukon (Koltun) 🔨	3	0	0	3	0	2	0	0	0	0	8
Alberta (Rocque)	0	1	1	0	2	0	2	1	1	1	9

==== Draw 9 ====
Monday, January 20, 6:30 pm

Sheet A	1	2	3	4	5	6	7	8	9	10	Final
Saskatchewan (Streifel)	0	0	2	0	1	0	0	1	0	1	5
Alberta (Rocque) 🔨	1	1	0	2	0	1	0	0	2	0	7

Sheet C	1	2	3	4	5	6	7	8	9	10	Final
British Columbia (Van Osch) 🔨	0	0	2	1	1	0	0	1	2	0	7
Northwest Territories (McKay-Saturnino)	0	1	0	0	0	0	1	0	0	3	5

Sheet H	1	2	3	4	5	6	7	8	9	10	Final
Nunavut (Pinksen)	0	0	1	0	1	0	1	1	X	X	4
Quebec (Boisvert) 🔨	3	2	0	3	0	2	0	0	X	X	10

==== Draw 10 ====
Tuesday, January 21, 9:30 am

Sheet H	1	2	3	4	5	6	7	8	9	10	Final
Alberta (Rocque)	0	2	0	0	0	2	1	0	2	X	7
Northwest Territories (McKay-Saturnino) 🔨	1	0	1	0	1	0	0	2	0	X	5

==== Draw 11 ====
Tuesday, January 21, 2:00 pm

Sheet A	1	2	3	4	5	6	7	8	9	10	Final
Saskatchewan (Streifel) 🔨	2	1	0	0	2	0	0	1	0	1	7
Quebec (Boisvert)	0	0	1	0	0	0	2	0	3	0	6

Sheet E	1	2	3	4	5	6	7	8	9	10	Final
British Columbia (Van Osch) 🔨	0	0	1	0	0	2	0	3	0	0	6
Yukon (Koltun)	0	2	0	2	1	0	1	0	1	1	8

=== Pool B ===
==== Draw 1 ====
Saturday, January 18, 9:30 am

Sheet H	1	2	3	4	5	6	7	8	9	10	Final
New Brunswick (Daigle)	0	3	0	3	0	0	0	4	1	0	11
Ontario (Greenwood) 🔨	2	0	3	0	1	2	2	0	0	2	12

==== Draw 2 ====
Saturday, January 18, 2:00 pm

Sheet B	1	2	3	4	5	6	7	8	9	10	Final
Prince Edward Island (Smith)	0	0	0	0	0	2	0	2	X	X	4
Manitoba (Brezden) 🔨	4	0	1	4	2	0	2	0	X	X	13

Sheet D	1	2	3	4	5	6	7	8	9	10	Final
Nova Scotia (Fay)	3	3	1	1	0	1	1	0	X	X	10
Newfoundland and Labrador (Hill) 🔨	0	0	0	0	1	0	0	1	X	X	2

==== Draw 3 ====
Saturday, January 18, 7:30 pm

Sheet B	1	2	3	4	5	6	7	8	9	10	Final
Northern Ontario (Burns) 🔨	0	0	1	1	2	0	1	0	4	1	10
New Brunswick (Daigle)	0	1	0	0	0	1	0	4	0	0	6

Sheet D	1	2	3	4	5	6	7	8	9	10	Final
Ontario (Greenwood) 🔨	1	0	0	1	0	2	1	3	X	X	8
Prince Edward Island (Smith)	0	0	0	0	1	0	0	0	X	X	1

Sheet H	1	2	3	4	5	6	7	8	9	10	Final
Nova Scotia (Fay) 🔨	0	2	0	1	0	0	0	1	1	X	5
Manitoba (Brezden)	0	0	1	0	1	0	1	0	0	X	3

==== Draw 4 ====
Sunday, January 19, 9:30 am

Sheet H	1	2	3	4	5	6	7	8	9	10	Final
Northern Ontario (Burns)	0	1	0	1	0	0	1	1	0	X	4
Prince Edward Island (Smith) 🔨	2	0	1	0	3	2	0	0	2	X	10

==== Draw 5 ====
Sunday, January 19, 2:00 pm

Sheet B	1	2	3	4	5	6	7	8	9	10	Final
Ontario (Greenwood)	0	0	0	1	0	2	1	1	4	X	9
Nova Scotia (Fay) 🔨	0	1	1	0	2	0	0	0	0	X	4

Sheet C	1	2	3	4	5	6	7	8	9	10	Final
Newfoundland and Labrador (Hill)	0	6	0	0	1	0	0	0	1	X	8
Manitoba (Brezden) 🔨	1	0	2	1	0	2	3	1	0	X	10

==== Draw 6 ====
Sunday, January 19, 6:30 pm

Sheet A	1	2	3	4	5	6	7	8	9	10	Final
Newfoundland and Labrador (Hill) 🔨	0	1	1	0	0	0	0	1	X	X	3
Prince Edward Island (Smith)	3	0	0	2	2	2	1	0	X	X	10

Sheet C	1	2	3	4	5	6	7	8	9	10	Final
Northern Ontario (Burns) 🔨	0	0	3	2	0	1	0	3	2	X	11
Ontario (Greenwood)	1	1	0	0	1	0	2	0	0	X	5

Sheet E	1	2	3	4	5	6	7	8	9	10	Final
Manitoba (Brezden)	0	1	0	2	1	1	0	0	0	X	5
New Brunswick (Daigle) 🔨	1	0	2	0	0	0	3	1	1	X	8

==== Draw 7 ====
Monday, January 20, 9:30 am

Sheet E	1	2	3	4	5	6	7	8	9	10	11	Final
Prince Edward Island (Smith) 🔨	1	0	0	0	1	0	1	1	0	1	0	5
New Brunswick (Daigle)	0	0	2	0	0	2	0	0	1	0	1	6

Sheet G	1	2	3	4	5	6	7	8	9	10	Final
Ontario (Greenwood)	0	0	2	1	0	0	0	0	2	2	7
Newfoundland and Labrador (Hill) 🔨	0	2	0	0	0	1	1	0	0	0	4

==== Draw 8 ====
Monday, January 20, 2:00 pm

Sheet A	1	2	3	4	5	6	7	8	9	10	Final
Nova Scotia (Fay) 🔨	1	0	1	0	1	0	3	3	X	X	9
Northern Ontario (Burns)	0	2	0	1	0	1	0	0	X	X	4

==== Draw 9 ====
Monday, January 20, 6:30 pm

Sheet D	1	2	3	4	5	6	7	8	9	10	Final
New Brunswick (Daigle) 🔨	1	1	0	0	4	3	0	0	X	X	9
Newfoundland and Labrador (Hill)	0	0	1	1	0	0	1	1	X	X	4

Sheet F	1	2	3	4	5	6	7	8	9	10	Final
Prince Edward Island (Smith)	0	0	0	2	0	0	0	3	0	X	5
Nova Scotia (Fay) 🔨	3	0	0	0	1	3	1	0	2	X	10

Sheet G	1	2	3	4	5	6	7	8	9	10	Final
Manitoba (Brezden)	4	1	1	0	0	1	0	0	2	0	9
Northern Ontario (Burns) 🔨	0	0	0	2	2	0	2	1	0	1	8

==== Draw 10 ====
Tuesday, January 21, 9:30 am

Sheet A	1	2	3	4	5	6	7	8	9	10	Final
Manitoba (Brezden) 🔨	0	1	0	1	0	1	0	0	0	X	3
Ontario (Greenwood)	1	0	1	0	1	0	0	3	1	X	7

Sheet E	1	2	3	4	5	6	7	8	9	10	Final
Newfoundland and Labrador (Hill) 🔨	1	0	2	0	0	0	3	0	1	0	7
Northern Ontario (Burns)	0	1	0	1	1	1	0	1	0	1	6

Sheet G	1	2	3	4	5	6	7	8	9	10	Final
New Brunswick (Daigle) 🔨	1	0	0	1	0	0	2	1	0	X	5
Nova Scotia (Fay)	0	2	3	0	2	2	0	0	1	X	10

==== Pool A Tie-Breaker ====
Tuesday, January 21, 6:30 pm

Team	1	2	3	4	5	6	7	8	9	10	Final
Yukon (Koltun)	0	1	0	0	0	3	0	1	1	0	6
Quebec (Boisvert) 🔨	1	0	0	2	1	0	2	0	0	1	7

== Placement Round ==
=== Seeding Pool ===
==== Standings ====
Final Standings

Province	Skip	W	L
Prince Edward Island	Veronica Smith	5	4
Yukon	Sarah Koltun	5	4
Northern Ontario	Krysta Burns	4	5
Newfoundland and Labrador	Sarah Hill	3	6
Northwest Territories	Carina McKay-Saturnino	2	7
Nunavut	Sadie Pinksen	0	9

===== Draw 1 =====
Tuesday, January 21, 6:30 pm

Team	1	2	3	4	5	6	7	8	9	10	Final
Nunavut (Pinksen)	1	0	0	0	0	0	0	2	0	X	3
Newfoundland and Labrador (Hill) 🔨	0	0	2	2	1	1	1	0	2	X	9

Team	1	2	3	4	5	6	7	8	9	10	Final
Northwest Territories (McKay-Saturnino) 🔨	0	0	1	1	0	0	1	0	1	0	4
Northern Ontario (Burns)	0	1	0	0	2	1	0	1	0	1	6

===== Draw 2 =====
Wednesday, January 22, 9:30 am

Team	1	2	3	4	5	6	7	8	9	10	Final
Yukon (Koltun)	0	0	1	2	0	0	1	0	2	0	6
Prince Edward Island (Smith) 🔨	1	1	0	0	0	1	0	2	0	2	7

Team	1	2	3	4	5	6	7	8	9	10	Final
Newfoundland and Labrador (Hill)	1	0	3	2	3	2	0	0	1	X	12
Northwest Territories (McKay-Saturnino) 🔨	0	2	0	0	0	0	2	1	0	X	5

===== Draw 3 =====
Wednesday, January 22, 6:30 pm

Team	1	2	3	4	5	6	7	8	9	10	Final
Prince Edward Island (Smith)	0	1	2	1	4	3	3	2	X	X	16
Nunavut (Pinksen) 🔨	1	0	0	0	0	0	0	0	X	X	1

===== Draw 4 =====
Thursday, January 23, 6:30 pm

Team	1	2	3	4	5	6	7	8	9	10	11	Final
Northern Ontario (Burns)	0	2	0	2	0	0	3	0	1	0	0	8
Yukon (Koltun) 🔨	3	0	1	0	0	2	0	1	0	1	1	9

===== Draw 5 =====
Friday, January 24, 12:30 pm

Team	1	2	3	4	5	6	7	8	9	10	Final
Northern Ontario (Burns) 🔨	2	1	1	0	4	0	0	2	X	X	10
Nunavut (Pinksen)	0	0	0	2	0	1	1	0	X	X	4

Team	1	2	3	4	5	6	7	8	9	10	Final
Prince Edward Island (Smith) 🔨	0	0	1	0	2	1	0	0	4	X	8
Northwest Territories (McKay-Saturnino)	0	1	0	1	0	0	1	1	0	X	4

Team	1	2	3	4	5	6	7	8	9	10	Final
Newfoundland and Labrador (Hill)	1	0	0	2	0	0	2	0	X	X	5
Yukon (Koltun) 🔨	0	1	4	0	2	2	0	1	X	X	10

=== Championship Pool Standings ===
Final Standings

Key
Teams to Playoffs

Province	Skip	W	L
Alberta	Kelsey Rocque	9	1
British Columbia	Kalia Van Osch	8	2
Nova Scotia	Mary Fay	8	2
Ontario	Molly Greenwood	7	3
Manitoba	Meaghan Brezden	5	5
Saskatchewan	Kristen Streifel	4	6
New Brunswick	Jessica Daigle	4	6
Quebec	Camille Boisvert	3	7

==== Draw 1 ====
Wednesday, January 22, 9:30 am

Team	1	2	3	4	5	6	7	8	9	10	Final
Quebec (Boisvert) 🔨	0	0	0	1	0	1	0	1	X	X	3
New Brunswick (Daigle)	0	0	3	0	1	0	4	0	X	X	8

==== Draw 2 ====
Wednesday, January 22, 2:00 pm

Team	1	2	3	4	5	6	7	8	9	10	Final
British Columbia (Van Osch)	0	0	0	3	0	0	1	1	2	0	7
Nova Scotia (Fay) 🔨	2	0	1	0	2	0	0	0	0	1	6

Team	1	2	3	4	5	6	7	8	9	10	Final
Saskatchewan (Streifel) 🔨	0	1	0	0	3	1	0	0	3	0	8
New Brunswick (Daigle)	0	0	1	2	0	0	2	0	0	1	6

Team	1	2	3	4	5	6	7	8	9	10	Final
Alberta (Rocque) 🔨	2	0	0	1	1	1	0	2	1	X	8
Ontario (Greenwood)	0	0	1	0	0	0	2	0	0	X	3

Team	1	2	3	4	5	6	7	8	9	10	Final
Quebec (Boisvert) 🔨	0	1	1	0	0	0	1	0	0	X	3
Manitoba (Brezden)	2	0	0	1	0	1	0	3	0	X	7

==== Draw 3 ====
Wednesday, January 22, 6:30 pm

Team	1	2	3	4	5	6	7	8	9	10	Final
Alberta (Rocque) 🔨	1	0	0	1	0	0	0	1	0	X	3
Nova Scotia (Fay)	0	1	0	0	2	1	1	0	1	X	6

Team	1	2	3	4	5	6	7	8	9	10	Final
British Columbia (Van Osch) 🔨	0	0	0	0	1	0	0	2	0	1	4
Ontario (Greenwood)	0	0	0	0	0	1	0	0	1	0	2

Team	1	2	3	4	5	6	7	8	9	10	Final
Saskatchewan (Streifel)	1	0	1	1	0	1	0	1	1	0	6
Manitoba (Brezden) 🔨	0	1	0	0	1	0	4	0	0	1	7

==== Draw 4 ====
Thursday, January 23, 9:30 am

Team	1	2	3	4	5	6	7	8	9	10	Final
Manitoba (Brezden)	0	0	1	0	1	0	2	0	0	0	4
British Columbia (Van Osch) 🔨	0	1	0	2	0	2	0	0	0	2	7

Team	1	2	3	4	5	6	7	8	9	10	Final
New Brunswick (Daigle)	0	0	1	0	1	0	0	2	0	X	4
Alberta (Rocque) 🔨	0	1	0	2	0	5	0	0	1	X	9

Team	1	2	3	4	5	6	7	8	9	10	Final
Ontario (Greenwood)	0	3	0	0	3	1	1	1	0	X	9
Quebec (Boisvert) 🔨	1	0	1	1	0	0	0	0	0	X	3

==== Draw 5 ====
Thursday, January 23, 2:00 pm

Team	1	2	3	4	5	6	7	8	9	10	11	Final
New Brunswick (Daigle) 🔨	0	0	1	0	2	0	1	1	0	1	0	6
British Columbia (Van Osch)	1	0	0	1	0	2	0	0	2	0	1	7

==== Draw 6 ====
Thursday, January 23, 6:30 pm

Team	1	2	3	4	5	6	7	8	9	10	Final
Nova Scotia (Fay)	0	1	0	0	2	1	2	0	1	0	7
Saskatchewan (Streifel) 🔨	3	0	1	0	0	0	0	1	0	1	6

Team	1	2	3	4	5	6	7	8	9	10	Final
Manitoba (Brezden) 🔨	0	2	0	1	0	0	1	0	0	X	4
Alberta (Rocque)	0	0	2	0	0	3	0	0	1	X	6

==== Draw 7 ====
Friday, January 24, 8:00 am

Team	1	2	3	4	5	6	7	8	9	10	Final
Ontario (Greenwood) 🔨	0	2	0	1	0	1	1	2	3	X	10
Saskatchewan (Streifel)	2	0	1	0	2	0	0	0	0	X	5

Team	1	2	3	4	5	6	7	8	9	10	Final
Nova Scotia (Fay)	1	1	1	0	0	0	1	2	3	X	9
Quebec (Boisvert)	0	0	0	1	1	3	0	0	0	X	5

== Playoffs ==
Semifinal			Final
			1	Alberta	7
2	British Columbia	8	2	British Columbia	6
3	Nova Scotia	4

=== Semifinal ===
Saturday, January 25, 9:30 am

Team	1	2	3	4	5	6	7	8	9	10	11	Final
British Columbia (Van Osch) 🔨	2	0	0	1	0	0	0	1	0	0	4	8
Nova Scotia (Fay)	0	0	2	0	0	1	0	0	0	1	0	4

Player percentages
British Columbia		Nova Scotia	
Ashley Sanderson	73%	Janique LeBlanc	85%
Sarah Daniels	76%	Karlee Burgess	70%
Marika Van Osch	66%	Jenn Smith	70%
Kalia Van Osch	76%	Mary Fay	70%
Total	73%	Total	74%

==== Final ====
Saturday, January 25, 4:00 pm

Team	1	2	3	4	5	6	7	8	9	10	Final
Alberta (Rocque) 🔨	0	0	2	0	2	0	2	0	0	1	7
British Columbia (Van Osch)	0	0	0	1	0	3	0	2	0	0	6

Player percentages
Alberta		British Columbia	
Claire Tully	85%	Ashley Sanderson	86%
Taylor McDonald	88%	Sarah Daniels	70%
Keely Brown	93%	Marika Van Osch	85%
Kelsey Rocque	68%	Kalia Van Osch	70%
Total	84%	Total	78%

2014 Canadian Junior Women's Curling Champions
(Alberta)
Alberta
7th Junior Women's National Championship title

== Awards ==
The all-star teams and award winners are as follows:

=== All-Star teams ===
Women

First Team

- Skip: Kelsey Rocque, Alberta 79%
- Third: Marika Van Osch, British Columbia 81%
- Second: Sarah Daniels, British Columbia 80%
- Lead: Karlee Korchinski, Saskatchewan 82%

Second Team

- Skip: Mary Fay, Nova Scotia 73%
- Third: Amy Heitzner, Ontario 77%
- Second: Karlee Burgess, Nova Scotia 76%
- Lead: Ashley Sanderson, British Columbia 80%

Men

First Team

- Skip: Carter Lautner, Alberta 80%
- Third: Michael Brophy, Nova Scotia 80%
- Second: Lucas Van Den Bosch, Manitoba 81%
- Lead: Jason Olsthoorn, Quebec 81%

Second Team

- Skip: (Ontario) Ryan McCrady, Manitoba 77%
- Third: Daniel Wenzek, New Brunswick 79%
- Second: David Aho, Alberta 79%
- Lead: Cole Lyon-Hatcher, Ontario 81%

=== Ken Watson Sportsmanship Awards ===
Women

- Patty Wallingham, Yukon second

Men

- Taylor Ardriel, Alberta third

=== Fair Play Awards ===
Women

- Lead: Hilary Charlie, Northwest Territories
- Second: Danielle Lafleur, Manitoba
- Third: Abby Ackland, Manitoba
- Skip: Carina McKay-Saturnino, Northwest Territories
- Coach: Dale McEwen, Manitoba

Men

- Lead: Deklen Crocker, Northwest Territories
- Second: Alex Sutherland, Prince Edward Island
- Third: Connor Faulkner, Nunavut
- Skip: Rene Comeau, New Brunswick
- Coach: Tom Clasper, Manitoba

=== ASHAM National Coaching Awards ===
Women

- Nick Saturnino, Northwest Territories

Men

- Tom Clasper, Manitoba

=== Joan Mead Legacy Awards ===
Women

- Cathlia Ward, New Brunswick Third

Men

- Cole Lyon-Hatcher, Ontario Lead
