= Jenn Smith =

Canadian curler

Jennifer Smith
- Curler

Team
- Curling club: Lakeshore CC, Lower Sackville, NS
- Skip: Carina McKay-Saturnino
- Fourth: Jenn Smith
- Third: Alicia Brine
- Second: Raquel Bachman

Curling career
- Other appearances: CJCC: 2 (2014, 2015)
Medal record
Women's Curling
Representing Nova Scotia
Canada Winter Games
| Silver medal – second place | 2015 Prince George |
Canadian Junior Curling Championships
| Bronze medal – third place | 2014 Liverpool |

Jennifer Smith is a Canadian curler from Berwick, Nova Scotia.

== Career ==
At just 15 years old, Smith played third for the Mary Fay rink along with Karlee Burgess and Janique LeBlanc and won the 2014 Nova Scotia Junior women's championship. They were the youngest team to win in 20 years, sending the four-some to the 2014 Canadian Junior Curling Championships to represent Nova Scotia. Despite their youth, the team finished with an 8-2 record, making the playoffs. The team would go on to lose to British Columbia, skipped by Kalia Van Osch in the semi-final, winning a bronze medal. The next year, the Fay rink won their second U21 Nova Scotia Provincials, earning the right to represent Nova Scotia at their second back-to-back Canadian Junior Curling Championship. The rink fell one step shorter than their previous year, finishing in a tie for fourth place with a 6-4 record.

Team Fay has also won three Under-15 provincial championships and won the 2013 Under-18 provincial championships, as well as the 2013 U-18 Atlantics. They represented Nova Scotia at the 2015 Canada Winter Games after beating club mate Cassie Cocks 7-3 in the provincial final. While at the games Smith and her Nova Scotian team went undefeated through the Round Robin, finishing with a perfect 5-0 record. According to the announcers when their game against Manitoba was televised on TSN, the Fay rink had the highest player percentages at every position and the highest team percentage after the first two draws. Their perfect record in the Round Robin earned them a bye to the Semi Finals. They once again played New Brunswick's Justine Comeau, after defeating her 7-5 in the Round Robin, and won on the last rock in the last end in a 7-6 decision. They went on to play Ontario in the Gold Medal Game, in which they lost 6-5 in an extra end.

The Fay rink would play in their first World Curling Tour event at the 2014 Gibson's Cashspiel, where they lost in the final to Mary-Anne Arsenault.

Smith and the Fay rink parted ways after the completion of the 2014-15 season. Shortly after the split Smith joined the McKay-Saturnino rink, throwing the fourth stones for the 2015-16 curling season.

== Teams ==
| Season | Skip | Third | Second | Lead |
|---|---|---|---|---|
| 2010–11 | Mary Fay | Jenn Smith | Karlee Burgess | Janique LeBlanc |
| 2011–12 | Mary Fay | Jenn Smith | Karlee Burgess | Janique LeBlanc |
| 2012–13 | Mary Fay | Jenn Smith | Karlee Burgess | Janique LeBlanc |
| 2013–14 | Mary Fay | Jenn Smith | Karlee Burgess | Janique LeBlanc |
| 2014–15 | Mary Fay | Jenn Smith | Karlee Burgess | Janique LeBlanc |
| 2015–16 | Carina McKay-Saturnino | Jenn Smith | Alicia Brine | Raquel Bachman |
