= Janique LeBlanc =

Canadian curler (born 1997)

- Curler
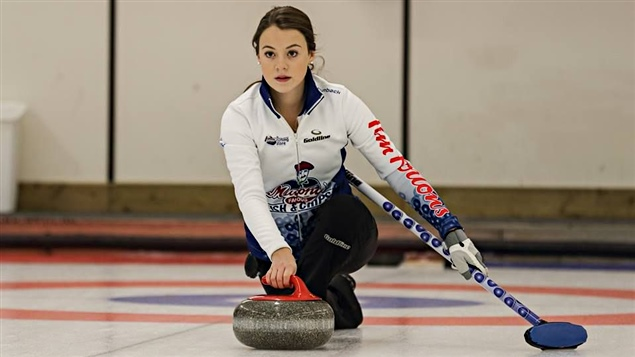
- LeBlanc curling at the 2015 Canada Winter Games in Prince George, British Columbia
- Other names: Jani
- Born: Janique LeBlanc; May 25, 1997 (age 29); Halifax, Nova Scotia

Team
- Curling club: Cornwall CC, Cornwall, PE
- Skip: Amanda Power
- Third: Sara Spafford
- Second: Emily Best
- Lead: Janique LeBlanc

Curling career
- Member Association: Nova Scotia (2010–17); Prince Edward Island (2023–Present)
- Other appearances: CJCC: 4 (2014, 2015, 2016, 2017)
Medal record
Women's Curling
Representing Canada
World Junior Curling Championships
Gold medal – first place	2016 Copenhagen
Representing Nova Scotia
Canada Winter Games
Silver medal – second place	2015 Prince George

Janique LeBlanc is a Canadian curler from Fall River, Nova Scotia.

== Curling career ==
At just 16 years old, LeBlanc played lead for the Mary Fay rink along with, Jenn Smith and Karlee Burgess and won the 2014 Nova Scotia Junior women's championship. They were the youngest team to win in 20 years., sending the four-some to the 2014 Canadian Junior Curling Championships to represent Nova Scotia. Despite their youth, the team finished with an 8-2 record, making the playoffs. The team would go on to lose to British Columbia, skipped by Kalia Van Osch in the semi-final, winning a bronze medal. The next year, the Fay rink won their second U21 Nova Scotia Provincials, earning the right to represent Nova Scotia at their second back-to-back Canadian Junior Curling Championship. The rink fell one step shorter than their previous year, finishing in a tie for fourth place with a 6-4 record. The Fay rink then qualified for the 2016 Canadian Juniors with their third provincial title. The rink finished in first place after the round robin with a 9-1 record, earning the rink a direct bye to the finals. In the finals, she played the British Columbia rink, this time skipped by Sarah Daniels, and won her first Canadian Junior title by defeating the British Columbia rink 9-5, and therefore representing Canada at the 2016 World Juniors in Copenhagen, Denmark.

Team Fay has also won three Under-15 provincial championships and won the 2013 Under-18 provincial championships, as well as the 2013 U-18 Atlantics. They represented Nova Scotia at the 2015 Canada Winter Games after beating club mate Cassie Cocks 7-3 in the provincial final. During the week of December 1, 2014, LeBlanc was named the team Nova Scotia athlete of the week While at the games LeBlanc and her Nova Scotian team went undefeated through the Round Robin, finishing with a perfect 5-0 record. According to the announcers when their game against Manitoba was televised on TSN, the Fay rink had the highest player percentages at every position and the highest team percentage after the first two draws. Their perfect record in the Round Robin earned them a bye to the Semi Finals. They once again played New Brunswick's Justine Comeau, after defeating her 7-5 in the Round Robin, and won on the last rock in the last end in a 7-6 decision. They went on to play Ontario in the Gold Medal Game, in which they lost 6-5 in an extra end. Jenn Smith and the Fay rink then parted ways after the completion of the 2014-15 season.

The Fay rink would play in their first World Curling Tour event at the 2014 Gibson's Cashspiel, where they lost in the final to Mary-Anne Arsenault.

LeBlanc returned to competitive curling with her new team skipped by Amanda Power out of PEI, where they finished in second place at the 2024 Prince Edward Island Scotties Tournament of Hearts. She returned to national-level curling at the 2024 Canadian Curling Club Championships, where the team went undefeated in the round robin and finished in second place, after losing to Nova Scotia in the final 10-9 in an extra end.

== Personal life ==
LeBlanc is the daughter of Jacques and Jocelyn LeBlanc. She is of Acadian descent and is fluent in both English and French.

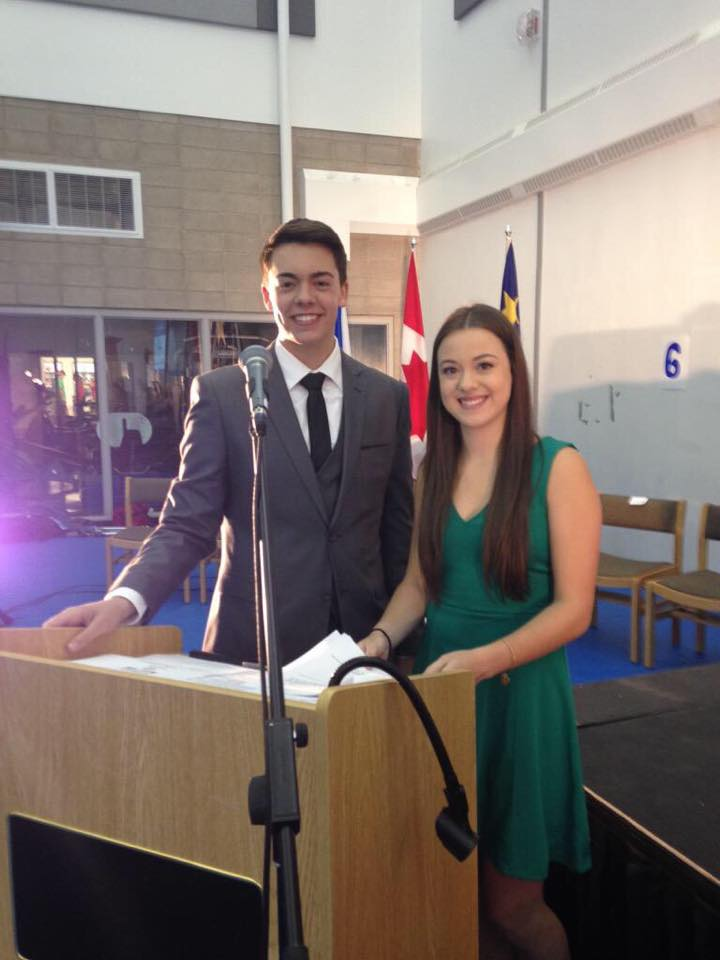
LeBlanc (right) at the closing ceremony of the 2015 Acadian Games in Halifax, NS.

LeBlanc attended École secondaire du Sommet in Halifax, Nova Scotia and went to Université de Moncton for the Bachelor of Science in Nursing program. LeBlanc is now a registered nurse with Indigenous Services Canada.

== Teams ==
Season	Skip	Third	Second	Lead
2010–11	Mary Fay	Jenn Smith	Karlee Burgess	Janique LeBlanc
2011–12	Mary Fay	Jenn Smith	Karlee Burgess	Janique LeBlanc
2012–13	Mary Fay	Jenn Smith	Karlee Burgess	Janique LeBlanc
2013–14	Mary Fay	Jenn Smith	Karlee Burgess	Janique LeBlanc
2014–15	Mary Fay	Jenn Smith	Karlee Burgess	Janique LeBlanc
2015–16	Mary Fay	Kristin Clarke	Karlee Burgess	Janique LeBlanc
2016–17	Kristin Clarke	Karlee Burgess	Janique LeBlanc	Emily Lloyd
2023–24	Amanda Power	Sara Spafford	Emily Best	Janique LeBlanc
2024–25	Amanda Power	Sara Spafford	Emily Best	Janique LeBlanc
