= Curling at the 2015 Canada Winter Games =

2015 Canada Winter Games
- Host city: Prince George, British Columbia
- Arena: Prince George Golf and Curling Club
- Dates: February 14–28
- Men's winner: Manitoba
- Curling club: Wildewood CC, Winnipeg
- Skip: Colin Kurz
- Third: Ryan Lemoine
- Second: Weston Oryniak
- Lead: Brendan Bilawka
- Finalist: Ontario (Matthew Hall)
- Women's winner: Ontario
- Curling club: Sudbury CC, Sudbury
- Skip: Megan Smith
- Third: Kira Brunton
- Second: Mikaela Cheslock
- Lead: Emma Johnson
- Finalist: Nova Scotia (Mary Fay)

Curling at the 2015 Canada Winter Games took place at the Prince George Golf and Curling Club in Prince George, British Columbia. The men's event ran from Saturday, February 14, 2015 to Friday, February 20, 2015. The women's event ran from Sunday, February 22, 2015 to Saturday, February 28, 2015.

== Medallists ==
| Games | Gold | Silver | Bronze |
|---|---|---|---|
| Men | Manitoba; Colin Kurz; Ryan Lemoine; Weston Oryniak; Brendan Bilawka | Ontario; Matthew Hall; Phil Malvar; Mackenzie Reid; Cody McGhee | British Columbia; Tyler Tardi; Sterling Middleton; Nicholas Umbach; Timothy Henderson |
| Women | Ontario; Megan Smith; Kira Brunton; Mikaela Cheslock; Emma Johnson | Nova Scotia; Mary Fay; Jenn Smith; Karlee Burgess; Janique LeBlanc | Saskatchewan; Kaitlyn Jones; Sara England; Shantel Hutton; Rayann Zerr |

== Men ==
=== Teams ===
| Pool | Province | Skip | Third | Second | Lead | Locale |
|---|---|---|---|---|---|---|
| A | Manitoba | Colin Kurz | Ryan Lemoine | Weston Oryniak | Brendan Bilawka | Wildewood CC, Winnipeg |
| A | Newfoundland and Labrador | Andrew Taylor | Liam Gregory | Connor Stapleton | Zach Payne | Re/Max Centre, St. John's |
| A | Northwest Territories | Deklen Crocker | Logan Gagnier | Braeden Picek | Ethan Allen | Inuvik CC, Inuvik |
| A | Ontario | Matthew Hall | Phil Malvar | Mackenzie Reid | Cody McGhee | Stroud CC, Innisfil |
| A | Quebec | Antoine Provencher | Thierry Marcotte Naud | William Dallaire | Louis Fauteux Loiselle | CC Laval, Montréal |
| A | Saskatchewan | Carson Ackerman | Mitchell Dales | Kacey Rodland | Brett Behm | MJFCC, Moose Jaw |
| B | Alberta | Owen Goerzen | Caleb Boorse | Kurtis Goller | Braden Burton | Airdrie CC, Airdrie |
| B | British Columbia | Tyler Tardi | Sterling Middleton | Nicholas Umbach | Timothy Henderson | Langley CC, Langley |
| B | New Brunswick | Carter Small | Ben MacFarlane | Adam Tracy | Brent Wishart | Capital WC, Fredericton |
| B | Nova Scotia | Matthew Manuel | Nick Zachernuk | Ryan Abraham | Alec Cameron | Mayflower CC, Halifax |
| B | Prince Edward Island | Tyler Smith | Brooks Roche | Dylan Lowery | Ryan Lowery | Montague CC, Montague |
| B | Yukon | Brayden Klassen | Bailey Muir-Cressman | Trygg Jensen | William Klassen | Whitehorse CC, Whitehorse |

Nunavut withdrew from the men's event

=== Round-robin standings ===
Final round-robin standings

Key
| Teams to Playoffs |
| Teams to Tie-Breakers |

| Pool A | W | L |
|---|---|---|
| Saskatchewan | 5 | 0 |
| Manitoba | 4 | 1 |
| Ontario | 3 | 2 |
| Quebec | 2 | 3 |
| Newfoundland and Labrador | 1 | 4 |
| Northwest Territories | 0 | 5 |

| Pool B | W | L |
|---|---|---|
| British Columbia | 5 | 0 |
| Nova Scotia | 4 | 1 |
| Prince Edward Island | 2 | 3 |
| Alberta | 2 | 3 |
| New Brunswick | 1 | 4 |
| Yukon | 1 | 4 |

=== Round-robin results ===
The draw is listed as follows:

==== Draw 1 ====
Sunday, February 15, 10:00

| Sheet B | 1 | 2 | 3 | 4 | 5 | 6 | 7 | 8 | 9 | 10 | Final |
|---|---|---|---|---|---|---|---|---|---|---|---|
| Newfoundland and Labrador (Taylor) 🔨 | 3 | 0 | 0 | 0 | 3 | 0 | 1 | 0 | 4 | X | 11 |
| Northwest Territories (Crocker) | 0 | 1 | 1 | 1 | 0 | 1 | 0 | 1 | 0 | X | 5 |

| Sheet C | 1 | 2 | 3 | 4 | 5 | 6 | 7 | 8 | 9 | 10 | 11 | Final |
|---|---|---|---|---|---|---|---|---|---|---|---|---|
| Quebec (Provencher) 🔨 | 0 | 0 | 2 | 0 | 0 | 1 | 1 | 0 | 2 | 0 | 0 | 6 |
| Saskatchewan (Ackerman) | 0 | 0 | 0 | 1 | 1 | 0 | 0 | 2 | 0 | 2 | 1 | 7 |

| Sheet E | 1 | 2 | 3 | 4 | 5 | 6 | 7 | 8 | 9 | 10 | Final |
|---|---|---|---|---|---|---|---|---|---|---|---|
| Alberta (Goerzen) | 0 | 1 | 0 | 1 | 1 | 1 | 0 | 0 | 0 | X | 4 |
| British Columbia (Tardi) 🔨 | 2 | 0 | 3 | 0 | 0 | 0 | 2 | 2 | 5 | X | 14 |

| Sheet F | 1 | 2 | 3 | 4 | 5 | 6 | 7 | 8 | 9 | 10 | Final |
|---|---|---|---|---|---|---|---|---|---|---|---|
| Nova Scotia (Manuel) | 1 | 3 | 0 | 0 | 0 | 2 | 0 | 1 | 2 | X | 9 |
| Yukon (Klassen) 🔨 | 0 | 0 | 1 | 1 | 1 | 0 | 0 | 0 | 0 | X | 3 |

==== Draw 2 ====
Sunday, February 15, 15:00

| Sheet A | 1 | 2 | 3 | 4 | 5 | 6 | 7 | 8 | 9 | 10 | Final |
|---|---|---|---|---|---|---|---|---|---|---|---|
| British Columbia (Tardi) 🔨 | 0 | 2 | 0 | 3 | 2 | 0 | 4 | 0 | X | X | 11 |
| Yukon (Klassen) | 0 | 0 | 0 | 0 | 0 | 2 | 0 | 0 | X | X | 2 |

| Sheet B | 1 | 2 | 3 | 4 | 5 | 6 | 7 | 8 | 9 | 10 | Final |
|---|---|---|---|---|---|---|---|---|---|---|---|
| Ontario (Hall) | 0 | 1 | 0 | 4 | 0 | 0 | 1 | 0 | 2 | X | 8 |
| Quebec (Provencher) 🔨 | 1 | 0 | 1 | 0 | 0 | 2 | 0 | 2 | 0 | X | 6 |

| Sheet C | 1 | 2 | 3 | 4 | 5 | 6 | 7 | 8 | 9 | 10 | Final |
|---|---|---|---|---|---|---|---|---|---|---|---|
| Manitoba (Kurz) 🔨 | 2 | 0 | 4 | 3 | 1 | 0 | 0 | 0 | 0 | X | 10 |
| Northwest Territories (Crocker) | 0 | 1 | 0 | 0 | 0 | 0 | 1 | 0 | 0 | X | 2 |

| Sheet E | 1 | 2 | 3 | 4 | 5 | 6 | 7 | 8 | 9 | 10 | Final |
|---|---|---|---|---|---|---|---|---|---|---|---|
| New Brunswick (Small) 🔨 | 0 | 0 | 0 | 1 | 0 | 1 | 0 | 1 | X | X | 3 |
| Nova Scotia (Manuel) | 0 | 1 | 2 | 0 | 5 | 0 | 2 | 0 | X | X | 10 |

| Sheet F | 1 | 2 | 3 | 4 | 5 | 6 | 7 | 8 | 9 | 10 | Final |
|---|---|---|---|---|---|---|---|---|---|---|---|
| Alberta (Goerzen) | 0 | 3 | 2 | 0 | 0 | 0 | 0 | 0 | 0 | 3 | 8 |
| Prince Edward Island (Smith) 🔨 | 1 | 0 | 0 | 1 | 1 | 1 | 0 | 0 | 1 | 0 | 5 |

==== Draw 3 ====
Monday, February 16, 10:00

| Sheet A | 1 | 2 | 3 | 4 | 5 | 6 | 7 | 8 | 9 | 10 | Final |
|---|---|---|---|---|---|---|---|---|---|---|---|
| Northwest Territories (Crocker) | 0 | 0 | 1 | 1 | 0 | 1 | 0 | 1 | 1 | X | 5 |
| Saskatchewan (Ackerman) 🔨 | 2 | 1 | 0 | 0 | 1 | 0 | 3 | 0 | 0 | X | 7 |

| Sheet B | 1 | 2 | 3 | 4 | 5 | 6 | 7 | 8 | 9 | 10 | Final |
|---|---|---|---|---|---|---|---|---|---|---|---|
| Prince Edward Island (Smith) | 0 | 0 | 0 | 2 | 1 | 0 | 0 | 1 | X | X | 4 |
| Nova Scotia (Manuel) 🔨 | 1 | 2 | 3 | 0 | 0 | 2 | 2 | 0 | X | X | 10 |

| Sheet D | 1 | 2 | 3 | 4 | 5 | 6 | 7 | 8 | 9 | 10 | Final |
|---|---|---|---|---|---|---|---|---|---|---|---|
| Yukon (Klassen) | 2 | 0 | 1 | 0 | 1 | 0 | 1 | 0 | 2 | X | 7 |
| Alberta (Goerzen) 🔨 | 0 | 1 | 0 | 0 | 0 | 2 | 0 | 1 | 0 | X | 4 |

| Sheet E | 1 | 2 | 3 | 4 | 5 | 6 | 7 | 8 | 9 | 10 | Final |
|---|---|---|---|---|---|---|---|---|---|---|---|
| Newfoundland and Labrador (Taylor) | 0 | 1 | 0 | 1 | 0 | 0 | 1 | 0 | 1 | X | 4 |
| Quebec (Provencher) 🔨 | 1 | 0 | 1 | 0 | 2 | 1 | 0 | 1 | 0 | X | 6 |

| Sheet F | 1 | 2 | 3 | 4 | 5 | 6 | 7 | 8 | 9 | 10 | Final |
|---|---|---|---|---|---|---|---|---|---|---|---|
| British Columbia (Tardi) 🔨 | 3 | 0 | 0 | 0 | 2 | 0 | 1 | 0 | 0 | 1 | 7 |
| New Brunswick (Small) | 0 | 0 | 0 | 1 | 0 | 2 | 0 | 2 | 1 | 0 | 6 |

==== Draw 4 ====
Monday, February 16, 15:00

| Sheet B | Final |
| Manitoba (Kurz) | 6 |
| Newfoundland and Labrador (Taylor) | 5 |

| Sheet C | 1 | 2 | 3 | 4 | 5 | 6 | 7 | 8 | 9 | 10 | Final |
|---|---|---|---|---|---|---|---|---|---|---|---|
| Alberta (Goerzen) 🔨 | 1 | 0 | 0 | 0 | 6 | 1 | 1 | 1 | X | X | 10 |
| New Brunswick (Small) | 0 | 0 | 0 | 1 | 0 | 0 | 0 | 0 | X | X | 1 |

| Sheet D | 1 | 2 | 3 | 4 | 5 | 6 | 7 | 8 | 9 | 10 | Final |
|---|---|---|---|---|---|---|---|---|---|---|---|
| Ontario (Hall) 🔨 | 0 | 1 | 0 | 0 | 0 | 1 | 0 | 0 | 2 | X | 4 |
| Saskatchewan (Ackerman) | 0 | 0 | 0 | 2 | 3 | 0 | 1 | 1 | 0 | X | 7 |

==== Draw 5 ====
Tuesday, February 17, 10:00

| Sheet C | 1 | 2 | 3 | 4 | 5 | 6 | 7 | 8 | 9 | 10 | Final |
|---|---|---|---|---|---|---|---|---|---|---|---|
| Nova Scotia (Manuel) 🔨 | 0 | 1 | 0 | 1 | 1 | 1 | 0 | 0 | 0 | 0 | 4 |
| British Columbia (Tardi) | 0 | 0 | 3 | 0 | 0 | 0 | 1 | 1 | 2 | 1 | 8 |

| Sheet D | 1 | 2 | 3 | 4 | 5 | 6 | 7 | 8 | 9 | 10 | Final |
|---|---|---|---|---|---|---|---|---|---|---|---|
| Quebec (Provencher) | 0 | 0 | 1 | 0 | 1 | 0 | 1 | 0 | 0 | X | 3 |
| Manitoba (Kurz) 🔨 | 0 | 0 | 0 | 2 | 0 | 2 | 0 | 2 | 2 | X | 8 |

| Sheet E | 1 | 2 | 3 | 4 | 5 | 6 | 7 | 8 | 9 | 10 | Final |
|---|---|---|---|---|---|---|---|---|---|---|---|
| Yukon (Klassen) | 0 | 2 | 0 | 0 | 0 | 0 | 2 | 0 | X | X | 4 |
| Prince Edward Island (Smith) 🔨 | 2 | 0 | 4 | 0 | 1 | 3 | 0 | 1 | X | X | 11 |

| Sheet F | 1 | 2 | 3 | 4 | 5 | 6 | 7 | 8 | 9 | 10 | Final |
|---|---|---|---|---|---|---|---|---|---|---|---|
| Northwest Territories (Crocker) | 0 | 0 | 0 | 0 | 0 | 1 | 0 | 0 | X | X | 1 |
| Ontario (Hall) 🔨 | 4 | 3 | 4 | 1 | 1 | 0 | 3 | 2 | X | X | 18 |

==== Draw 6 ====
Tuesday, February 17, 15:00

| Sheet A | 1 | 2 | 3 | 4 | 5 | 6 | 7 | 8 | 9 | 10 | Final |
|---|---|---|---|---|---|---|---|---|---|---|---|
| Nova Scotia (Manuel) 🔨 | 1 | 0 | 0 | 2 | 0 | 0 | 2 | 0 | 0 | 2 | 7 |
| Alberta (Goerzen) | 0 | 2 | 0 | 0 | 0 | 2 | 0 | 2 | 0 | 0 | 6 |

| Sheet C | 1 | 2 | 3 | 4 | 5 | 6 | 7 | 8 | 9 | 10 | Final |
|---|---|---|---|---|---|---|---|---|---|---|---|
| Saskatchewan (Ackerman) 🔨 | 2 | 1 | 0 | 0 | 2 | 0 | 3 | 3 | X | X | 11 |
| Newfoundland and Labrador (Taylor) | 0 | 0 | 1 | 1 | 0 | 1 | 0 | 0 | X | X | 3 |

| Sheet D | 1 | 2 | 3 | 4 | 5 | 6 | 7 | 8 | 9 | 10 | 11 | Final |
|---|---|---|---|---|---|---|---|---|---|---|---|---|
| Prince Edward Island (Smith) | 1 | 0 | 2 | 0 | 0 | 2 | 0 | 2 | 0 | 0 | 1 | 8 |
| New Brunswick (Small) 🔨 | 0 | 1 | 0 | 1 | 1 | 0 | 1 | 0 | 2 | 1 | 0 | 7 |

| Sheet E | 1 | 2 | 3 | 4 | 5 | 6 | 7 | 8 | 9 | 10 | Final |
|---|---|---|---|---|---|---|---|---|---|---|---|
| Manitoba (Kurz) | 0 | 1 | 1 | 1 | 0 | 2 | 2 | 1 | X | X | 8 |
| Ontario (Hall) 🔨 | 2 | 0 | 0 | 0 | 1 | 0 | 0 | 0 | X | X | 3 |

==== Draw 7 ====
Wednesday, February 18, 9:00

| Sheet A | 1 | 2 | 3 | 4 | 5 | 6 | 7 | 8 | 9 | 10 | Final |
|---|---|---|---|---|---|---|---|---|---|---|---|
| Ontario (Hall) | 2 | 1 | 0 | 3 | 3 | 1 | 1 | 0 | X | X | 11 |
| Newfoundland and Labrador (Taylor) 🔨 | 0 | 0 | 1 | 0 | 0 | 0 | 0 | 0 | X | X | 1 |

| Sheet B | 1 | 2 | 3 | 4 | 5 | 6 | 7 | 8 | 9 | 10 | Final |
|---|---|---|---|---|---|---|---|---|---|---|---|
| British Columbia (Tardi) 🔨 | 0 | 1 | 0 | 0 | 2 | 0 | 0 | 2 | 0 | 3 | 8 |
| Prince Edward Island (Smith) | 0 | 0 | 2 | 1 | 0 | 1 | 2 | 0 | 0 | 0 | 6 |

| Sheet C | 1 | 2 | 3 | 4 | 5 | 6 | 7 | 8 | 9 | 10 | Final |
|---|---|---|---|---|---|---|---|---|---|---|---|
| New Brunswick (Small) 🔨 | 1 | 3 | 3 | 3 | 2 | 3 | 2 | 1 | X | X | 18 |
| Yukon (Klassen) | 0 | 0 | 0 | 0 | 0 | 0 | 0 | 0 | X | X | 0 |

| Sheet E | 1 | 2 | 3 | 4 | 5 | 6 | 7 | 8 | 9 | 10 | Final |
|---|---|---|---|---|---|---|---|---|---|---|---|
| Quebec (Provencher) 🔨 | 2 | 1 | 0 | 2 | 1 | 5 | 0 | 2 | X | X | 13 |
| Northwest Territories (Crocker) | 0 | 0 | 0 | 0 | 0 | 0 | 1 | 0 | X | X | 1 |

| Sheet F | 1 | 2 | 3 | 4 | 5 | 6 | 7 | 8 | 9 | 10 | Final |
|---|---|---|---|---|---|---|---|---|---|---|---|
| Manitoba (Kurz) | 0 | 2 | 0 | 2 | 2 | 0 | 0 | 2 | 0 | 0 | 8 |
| Saskatchewan (Ackerman) 🔨 | 2 | 0 | 3 | 0 | 0 | 2 | 1 | 0 | 1 | 1 | 10 |

==== Tie-Breaker ====
Wednesday, February 18, 15:00

| Team | 1 | 2 | 3 | 4 | 5 | 6 | 7 | 8 | 9 | 10 | Final |
|---|---|---|---|---|---|---|---|---|---|---|---|
| Alberta (Goerzen) | 1 | 0 | 0 | 2 | 1 | 0 | 1 | 0 | 3 | 0 | 8 |
| Prince Edward Island (Smith) 🔨 | 0 | 1 | 1 | 0 | 0 | 3 | 0 | 3 | 0 | 1 | 9 |

=== Crossover ===
Thursday, February 19, 12:00

| Sheet A | 1 | 2 | 3 | 4 | 5 | 6 | 7 | 8 | 9 | 10 | Final |
|---|---|---|---|---|---|---|---|---|---|---|---|
| Quebec (Provencher) | 0 | 0 | 1 | 0 | 0 | 3 | 0 | 1 | X | X | 5 |
| New Brunswick (Small) 🔨 | 2 | 1 | 0 | 1 | 4 | 0 | 1 | 0 | X | X | 9 |

| Sheet C | 1 | 2 | 3 | 4 | 5 | 6 | 7 | 8 | 9 | 10 | Final |
|---|---|---|---|---|---|---|---|---|---|---|---|
| Newfoundland and Labrador (Taylor) | 1 | 0 | 0 | 1 | 0 | 0 | 3 | 0 | 3 | X | 8 |
| Yukon (Klassen) 🔨 | 0 | 0 | 0 | 0 | 0 | 1 | 0 | 2 | 0 | X | 3 |

| Sheet E | 1 | 2 | 3 | 4 | 5 | 6 | 7 | 8 | 9 | 10 | Final |
|---|---|---|---|---|---|---|---|---|---|---|---|
| Northwest Territories (Crocker) | 0 | 3 | 0 | 0 | 0 | 1 | 0 | 0 | X | X | 4 |
| Alberta (Goerzen) 🔨 | 3 | 0 | 5 | 2 | 2 | 0 | 1 | 1 | X | X | 14 |

Thursday, February 19, 19:00

| Sheet A | 1 | 2 | 3 | 4 | 5 | 6 | 7 | 8 | 9 | 10 | Final |
|---|---|---|---|---|---|---|---|---|---|---|---|
| Alberta (Goerzen) 🔨 | 0 | 0 | 1 | 0 | 0 | 0 | 1 | 0 | 2 | 0 | 4 |
| Newfoundland and Labrador (Taylor) | 0 | 1 | 0 | 0 | 1 | 1 | 0 | 1 | 0 | 1 | 5 |

| Sheet E | 1 | 2 | 3 | 4 | 5 | 6 | 7 | 8 | 9 | 10 | Final |
|---|---|---|---|---|---|---|---|---|---|---|---|
| New Brunswick (Small) 🔨 | 1 | 3 | 0 | 0 | 0 | 2 | 0 | 0 | 2 | 2 | 10 |
| Northwest Territories (Crocker) | 0 | 0 | 1 | 2 | 3 | 0 | 0 | 3 | 0 | 0 | 9 |

| Sheet F | 1 | 2 | 3 | 4 | 5 | 6 | 7 | 8 | 9 | 10 | Final |
|---|---|---|---|---|---|---|---|---|---|---|---|
| Yukon (Klassen) | 0 | 0 | 0 | 0 | 0 | 0 | 1 | 0 | 0 | X | 1 |
| Quebec (Provencher) 🔨 | 0 | 0 | 0 | 1 | 1 | 0 | 0 | 3 | 0 | X | 5 |

Friday, February 20, 9:00

| Sheet B | 1 | 2 | 3 | 4 | 5 | 6 | 7 | 8 | 9 | 10 | Final |
|---|---|---|---|---|---|---|---|---|---|---|---|
| Quebec (Provencher) | 0 | 2 | 0 | 0 | 1 | 0 | 0 | 0 | X | X | 3 |
| Alberta (Goerzen) 🔨 | 5 | 0 | 1 | 1 | 0 | 2 | 0 | 1 | X | X | 10 |

| Sheet D | 1 | 2 | 3 | 4 | 5 | 6 | 7 | 8 | 9 | 10 | 11 | Final |
|---|---|---|---|---|---|---|---|---|---|---|---|---|
| Newfoundland and Labrador (Taylor) 🔨 | 1 | 0 | 0 | 0 | 3 | 0 | 3 | 0 | 1 | 0 | 0 | 8 |
| New Brunswick (Small) | 0 | 1 | 1 | 1 | 0 | 1 | 0 | 1 | 0 | 3 | 1 | 9 |

| Sheet E | 1 | 2 | 3 | 4 | 5 | 6 | 7 | 8 | 9 | 10 | Final |
|---|---|---|---|---|---|---|---|---|---|---|---|
| Northwest Territories (Crocker) | 0 | 3 | 0 | 1 | 0 | 2 | 0 | 0 | 0 | 1 | 7 |
| Yukon (Klassen) 🔨 | 1 | 0 | 2 | 0 | 2 | 0 | 3 | 0 | 0 | 0 | 8 |

=== Playoffs ===
Quarterfinals
B2 | Nova Scotia | 4
A3 | Ontario | 8
B3 | Prince Edward Island | 4
A2 | Manitoba | 9

Semifinals
A1 | Saskatchewan | 5
A3 | Ontario | 9
B1 | British Columbia | 5
A2 | Manitoba | 6

Final
A3 | Ontario | 2
A2 | Manitoba | 10

| Bronze Medal Game |
| A1 | Saskatchewan | 2 |
| B1 | British Columbia | 11 |

| Fifth Place Game |
| B2 | Nova Scotia | 8 |
| B3 | Prince Edward Island | 3 |

==== Quarterfinals ====
Thursday, February 19, 12:00

| Sheet B | 1 | 2 | 3 | 4 | 5 | 6 | 7 | 8 | 9 | 10 | Final |
|---|---|---|---|---|---|---|---|---|---|---|---|
| Nova Scotia (Manuel) 🔨 | 0 | 0 | 1 | 2 | 0 | 0 | 0 | 1 | 0 | X | 4 |
| Ontario (Hall) | 1 | 1 | 0 | 0 | 3 | 1 | 1 | 0 | 1 | X | 8 |

| Sheet D | 1 | 2 | 3 | 4 | 5 | 6 | 7 | 8 | 9 | 10 | Final |
|---|---|---|---|---|---|---|---|---|---|---|---|
| Prince Edward Island (Smith) | 0 | 0 | 1 | 0 | 1 | 0 | 2 | 0 | X | X | 4 |
| Manitoba (Kurz) 🔨 | 2 | 1 | 0 | 4 | 0 | 1 | 0 | 1 | X | X | 9 |

==== Semifinals ====
Thursday, February 19, 19:00

| Sheet B | 1 | 2 | 3 | 4 | 5 | 6 | 7 | 8 | 9 | 10 | Final |
|---|---|---|---|---|---|---|---|---|---|---|---|
| Manitoba (Kurz) | 2 | 0 | 0 | 0 | 2 | 0 | 2 | 0 | 0 | 0 | 6 |
| British Columbia (Tardi) 🔨 | 0 | 0 | 1 | 0 | 0 | 1 | 0 | 0 | 2 | 1 | 5 |

| Sheet D | 1 | 2 | 3 | 4 | 5 | 6 | 7 | 8 | 9 | 10 | Final |
|---|---|---|---|---|---|---|---|---|---|---|---|
| Ontario (Hall) | 0 | 2 | 1 | 2 | 2 | 0 | 0 | 0 | 2 | X | 9 |
| Saskatchewan (Ackerman) 🔨 | 3 | 0 | 0 | 0 | 0 | 1 | 1 | 0 | 0 | X | 5 |

==== Fifth Place Game ====
Friday, February 20, 9:00

| Sheet F | 1 | 2 | 3 | 4 | 5 | 6 | 7 | 8 | 9 | 10 | Final |
|---|---|---|---|---|---|---|---|---|---|---|---|
| Nova Scotia (Manuel) 🔨 | 1 | 0 | 1 | 1 | 0 | 1 | 1 | 0 | 1 | 2 | 8 |
| Prince Edward Island (Smith) | 0 | 1 | 0 | 0 | 0 | 0 | 0 | 2 | 0 | 0 | 3 |

==== Bronze Medal Game ====
Friday, February 20, 13:00

| Sheet C | 1 | 2 | 3 | 4 | 5 | 6 | 7 | 8 | 9 | 10 | Final |
|---|---|---|---|---|---|---|---|---|---|---|---|
| Saskatchewan (Ackerman) | 0 | 0 | 0 | 1 | 0 | 0 | 0 | 1 | X | X | 2 |
| British Columbia (Tardi) 🔨 | 2 | 1 | 1 | 0 | 0 | 5 | 2 | 0 | X | X | 11 |

==== Gold Medal Game ====
Friday, February 20, 17:00

| Sheet C | 1 | 2 | 3 | 4 | 5 | 6 | 7 | 8 | 9 | 10 | Final |
|---|---|---|---|---|---|---|---|---|---|---|---|
| Ontario (Hall) | 0 | 0 | 1 | 1 | 0 | 0 | 0 | 0 | X | X | 2 |
| Manitoba (Kurz) 🔨 | 1 | 1 | 0 | 0 | 2 | 3 | 2 | 1 | X | X | 10 |

=== Final standings ===
| Province | Rank |
|---|---|
| Manitoba | 1st place, gold medalist(s) |
| Ontario | 2nd place, silver medalist(s) |
| British Columbia | 3rd place, bronze medalist(s) |
| Saskatchewan | 4 |
| Nova Scotia | 5 |
| Prince Edward Island | 6 |
| New Brunswick | 7 |
| Alberta | 8 |
| Newfoundland and Labrador | 9 |
| Quebec | 10 |
| Yukon | 11 |
| Northwest Territories | 12 |

== Women ==
=== Teams ===
| Pool | Province | Skip | Third | Second | Lead | Locale |
|---|---|---|---|---|---|---|
| A | British Columbia | Sarah Daniels | Dezaray Hawes | Cierra Fisher | Sydney Hofer | Delta Thistle CC, Delta |
| A | Northwest Territories | Carina McKay-Saturnino | Karly King Simpson | Rayna Vittrekwa | Vanessa Lennie | Inuvik CC, Inuvik |
| A | Nunavut | Sadie Pinksen | Christianne West | Katie Chislett Manning | Kaitlin MacDonald | Iqaluit CC, Iqaluit |
| A | Ontario | Megan Smith | Kira Brunton | Mikaela Cheslock | Emma Johnson | Sudbury CC, Sudbury |
| A | Prince Edward Island | Kaleigh Mackay | Danielle Collings | Alyssa Wright | Kaleigh Peters | Montague CC, Montague |
| A | Saskatchewan | Kaitlyn Jones | Sara England | Shantel Hutton | Rayann Zerr | Tartan CC, Regina |
| A | Yukon | Alyssa Meger | Bayly Scoffin | Peyton L'Henaff | Karen Smallwood | Whitehorse CC, Whitehorse |
| B | Alberta | Veronica Maschmeyer | Sydney Parent | Breanne Koziak | Katelyn Skolski | Saville SC, Edmonton |
| B | Manitoba | Shae Bevan | Jordyn McIntyre | Rachel Morris | Jessie Robertson | Elmwood CC, Winnipeg |
| B | New Brunswick | Justine Comeau | Emma LeBlanc | Brigitte Comeau | Keira McLaughlin | Capital WC, Fredericton |
| B | Newfoundland and Labrador | Megan Kearley | Chantal Newell | Lauren Barron | Sydney Parsons | Re/Max Centre, St. John's |
| B | Nova Scotia | Mary Fay | Jenn Smith | Karlee Burgess | Janique LeBlanc | Chester CC, Chester |
| B | Quebec | Émilia Gagné | Claudie Tremblay | Julie Fortin | Marie-Pier Harvey | CC Riverbend, Alma |

=== Round-robin standings ===
Final round-robin standings

Key
| Teams to Playoffs |
| Teams to Tie-Breakers |

| Pool A | W | L |
|---|---|---|
| Ontario | 6 | 0 |
| British Columbia | 5 | 1 |
| Saskatchewan | 4 | 2 |
| Northwest Territories | 3 | 3 |
| Prince Edward Island | 2 | 4 |
| Nunavut | 1 | 5 |
| Yukon | 0 | 6 |

| Pool B | W | L |
|---|---|---|
| Nova Scotia | 5 | 0 |
| Alberta | 4 | 1 |
| New Brunswick | 2 | 3 |
| Quebec | 2 | 3 |
| Manitoba | 2 | 3 |
| Newfoundland and Labrador | 0 | 5 |

=== Round-robin results ===
The draw is listed as follows:

==== Draw 1 ====
Monday, February 23, 10:00

| Sheet A | 1 | 2 | 3 | 4 | 5 | 6 | 7 | 8 | 9 | 10 | Final |
|---|---|---|---|---|---|---|---|---|---|---|---|
| Nunavut (Pinksen) | 0 | 0 | 0 | 1 | 0 | 2 | 0 | 0 | X | X | 3 |
| British Columbia (Daniels) 🔨 | 0 | 0 | 3 | 0 | 4 | 0 | 1 | 2 | X | X | 10 |

| Sheet B | 1 | 2 | 3 | 4 | 5 | 6 | 7 | 8 | 9 | 10 | Final |
|---|---|---|---|---|---|---|---|---|---|---|---|
| Yukon (Meger) | 0 | 0 | 0 | 1 | 1 | 0 | 0 | 0 | 1 | X | 3 |
| Northwest Territories (McKay-Saturnino) 🔨 | 0 | 1 | 1 | 0 | 0 | 2 | 1 | 0 | 0 | X | 5 |

| Sheet C | 1 | 2 | 3 | 4 | 5 | 6 | 7 | 8 | 9 | 10 | Final |
|---|---|---|---|---|---|---|---|---|---|---|---|
| Prince Edward Island (Mackay) | 0 | 0 | 1 | 0 | 0 | 0 | 1 | 0 | 1 | X | 3 |
| Saskatchewan (Jones) 🔨 | 1 | 0 | 0 | 1 | 2 | 0 | 0 | 3 | 0 | X | 7 |

| Sheet D | 1 | 2 | 3 | 4 | 5 | 6 | 7 | 8 | 9 | 10 | Final |
|---|---|---|---|---|---|---|---|---|---|---|---|
| Newfoundland and Labrador (Kearley) | 1 | 2 | 0 | 0 | 0 | 0 | 1 | 0 | 3 | 0 | 7 |
| Nova Scotia (Fay) 🔨 | 0 | 0 | 1 | 2 | 1 | 2 | 0 | 1 | 0 | 2 | 9 |

| Sheet E | 1 | 2 | 3 | 4 | 5 | 6 | 7 | 8 | 9 | 10 | Final |
|---|---|---|---|---|---|---|---|---|---|---|---|
| Manitoba (Bevan) 🔨 | 1 | 0 | 3 | 1 | 0 | 1 | 0 | 1 | 0 | 1 | 8 |
| Quebec (Gagné) | 0 | 2 | 0 | 0 | 1 | 0 | 1 | 0 | 3 | 0 | 7 |

| Sheet F | 1 | 2 | 3 | 4 | 5 | 6 | 7 | 8 | 9 | 10 | Final |
|---|---|---|---|---|---|---|---|---|---|---|---|
| Alberta (Maschmeyer) | 0 | 2 | 1 | 0 | 0 | 0 | 1 | 1 | 0 | 1 | 6 |
| New Brunswick (Comeau) 🔨 | 1 | 0 | 0 | 1 | 1 | 1 | 0 | 0 | 1 | 0 | 5 |

==== Draw 2 ====
Monday, February 23, 15:00

| Sheet A | 1 | 2 | 3 | 4 | 5 | 6 | 7 | 8 | 9 | 10 | Final |
|---|---|---|---|---|---|---|---|---|---|---|---|
| New Brunswick (Comeau) 🔨 | 1 | 0 | 0 | 2 | 1 | 0 | 1 | 0 | 0 | X | 5 |
| Quebec (Gagné) | 0 | 0 | 2 | 0 | 0 | 2 | 0 | 2 | 1 | X | 7 |

| Sheet B | 1 | 2 | 3 | 4 | 5 | 6 | 7 | 8 | 9 | 10 | Final |
|---|---|---|---|---|---|---|---|---|---|---|---|
| Ontario (Smith) 🔨 | 2 | 2 | 0 | 1 | 0 | 0 | 1 | 1 | 0 | 3 | 10 |
| Prince Edward Island (Mackay) | 0 | 0 | 1 | 0 | 3 | 1 | 0 | 0 | 2 | 0 | 7 |

| Sheet C | 1 | 2 | 3 | 4 | 5 | 6 | 7 | 8 | 9 | 10 | Final |
|---|---|---|---|---|---|---|---|---|---|---|---|
| British Columbia (Daniels) 🔨 | 0 | 0 | 0 | 3 | 0 | 1 | 0 | 2 | 2 | X | 8 |
| Northwest Territories (McKay-Saturnino) | 0 | 0 | 0 | 0 | 0 | 0 | 1 | 0 | 0 | X | 1 |

| Sheet D | 1 | 2 | 3 | 4 | 5 | 6 | 7 | 8 | 9 | 10 | Final |
|---|---|---|---|---|---|---|---|---|---|---|---|
| Nunavut (Pinksen) | 0 | 1 | 1 | 1 | 2 | 0 | 1 | 1 | 1 | X | 8 |
| Yukon (Meger) 🔨 | 1 | 0 | 0 | 0 | 0 | 1 | 0 | 0 | 0 | X | 2 |

| Sheet E | 1 | 2 | 3 | 4 | 5 | 6 | 7 | 8 | 9 | 10 | Final |
|---|---|---|---|---|---|---|---|---|---|---|---|
| Nova Scotia (Fay) 🔨 | 0 | 1 | 0 | 2 | 0 | 4 | 0 | 4 | X | X | 11 |
| Alberta (Maschmeyer) | 0 | 0 | 2 | 0 | 1 | 0 | 1 | 0 | X | X | 4 |

| Sheet F | 1 | 2 | 3 | 4 | 5 | 6 | 7 | 8 | 9 | 10 | Final |
|---|---|---|---|---|---|---|---|---|---|---|---|
| Manitoba (Bevan) | 0 | 0 | 1 | 0 | 1 | 0 | 0 | 0 | 0 | 2 | 4 |
| Newfoundland and Labrador (Kearley) 🔨 | 0 | 0 | 0 | 0 | 0 | 2 | 0 | 0 | 0 | 0 | 2 |

==== Draw 3 ====
Tuesday, February 24, 10:00

| Sheet B | 1 | 2 | 3 | 4 | 5 | 6 | 7 | 8 | 9 | 10 | Final |
|---|---|---|---|---|---|---|---|---|---|---|---|
| Manitoba (Bevan) | 0 | 0 | 0 | 1 | 0 | 1 | 0 | 1 | 0 | X | 3 |
| Nova Scotia (Fay) 🔨 | 0 | 2 | 0 | 0 | 1 | 0 | 1 | 0 | 2 | X | 6 |

| Sheet D | 1 | 2 | 3 | 4 | 5 | 6 | 7 | 8 | 9 | 10 | Final |
|---|---|---|---|---|---|---|---|---|---|---|---|
| Ontario (Smith) | 0 | 3 | 0 | 2 | 4 | 2 | 1 | 0 | X | X | 12 |
| Saskatchewan (Jones) 🔨 | 1 | 0 | 0 | 0 | 0 | 0 | 0 | 1 | X | X | 2 |

| Sheet E | 1 | 2 | 3 | 4 | 5 | 6 | 7 | 8 | 9 | 10 | Final |
|---|---|---|---|---|---|---|---|---|---|---|---|
| Northwest Territories (McKay-Saturnino) | 1 | 0 | 2 | 0 | 0 | 0 | 0 | 3 | 0 | X | 6 |
| Nunavut (Pinksen) 🔨 | 0 | 1 | 0 | 1 | 0 | 0 | 0 | 0 | 1 | X | 3 |

| Sheet F | 1 | 2 | 3 | 4 | 5 | 6 | 7 | 8 | 9 | 10 | Final |
|---|---|---|---|---|---|---|---|---|---|---|---|
| British Columbia (Daniels) 🔨 | 2 | 2 | 3 | 1 | 1 | 0 | 0 | 1 | X | X | 10 |
| Yukon (Meger) | 0 | 0 | 0 | 0 | 0 | 1 | 1 | 0 | X | X | 2 |

==== Draw 4 ====
Tuesday, February 24, 15:00

| Sheet A | Final |
| Northwest Territories (McKay-Saturnino) | 2 |
| Saskatchewan (Jones) | 10 |

| Sheet B | Final |
| Alberta (Maschmeyer) | 10 |
| Newfoundland and Labrador (Kearley) | 6 |

| Sheet C | 1 | 2 | 3 | 4 | 5 | 6 | 7 | 8 | 9 | 10 | 11 | Final |
|---|---|---|---|---|---|---|---|---|---|---|---|---|
| Nunavut (Pinksen) 🔨 | 1 | 0 | 0 | 1 | 1 | 0 | 0 | 1 | 0 | 0 | 0 | 4 |
| Ontario (Smith) | 0 | 2 | 0 | 0 | 0 | 1 | 0 | 0 | 0 | 1 | 4 | 8 |

| Sheet D | 1 | 2 | 3 | 4 | 5 | 6 | 7 | 8 | 9 | 10 | Final |
|---|---|---|---|---|---|---|---|---|---|---|---|
| Manitoba (Bevan) | 0 | 0 | 0 | 0 | 0 | 0 | 0 | 0 | X | X | 0 |
| New Brunswick (Comeau) 🔨 | 0 | 2 | 1 | 0 | 1 | 1 | 3 | 3 | X | X | 11 |

| Sheet E | 1 | 2 | 3 | 4 | 5 | 6 | 7 | 8 | 9 | 10 | Final |
|---|---|---|---|---|---|---|---|---|---|---|---|
| Prince Edward Island (Mackay) 🔨 | 2 | 1 | 0 | 2 | 2 | 0 | 0 | 2 | X | X | 9 |
| Yukon (Meger) | 0 | 0 | 1 | 0 | 0 | 1 | 1 | 0 | X | X | 3 |

| Sheet F | 1 | 2 | 3 | 4 | 5 | 6 | 7 | 8 | 9 | 10 | Final |
|---|---|---|---|---|---|---|---|---|---|---|---|
| Nova Scotia (Fay) 🔨 | 0 | 0 | 0 | 0 | 1 | 0 | 3 | 0 | 0 | 2 | 6 |
| Quebec (Gagné) | 0 | 0 | 1 | 0 | 0 | 1 | 0 | 2 | 1 | 0 | 5 |

==== Draw 5 ====
Wednesday, February 25, 10:00

| Sheet B | 1 | 2 | 3 | 4 | 5 | 6 | 7 | 8 | 9 | 10 | Final |
|---|---|---|---|---|---|---|---|---|---|---|---|
| Saskatchewan (Jones) 🔨 | 0 | 0 | 0 | 4 | 0 | 1 | 1 | 2 | X | X | 8 |
| Nunavut (Pinksen) | 0 | 0 | 0 | 0 | 1 | 0 | 0 | 0 | X | X | 1 |

| Sheet C | 1 | 2 | 3 | 4 | 5 | 6 | 7 | 8 | 9 | 10 | Final |
|---|---|---|---|---|---|---|---|---|---|---|---|
| Alberta (Maschmeyer) | 0 | 0 | 0 | 1 | 0 | 3 | 1 | 0 | 1 | 1 | 7 |
| Quebec (Gagné) 🔨 | 0 | 2 | 2 | 0 | 1 | 0 | 0 | 1 | 0 | 0 | 6 |

| Sheet D | 1 | 2 | 3 | 4 | 5 | 6 | 7 | 8 | 9 | 10 | Final |
|---|---|---|---|---|---|---|---|---|---|---|---|
| Prince Edward Island (Mackay) | 0 | 1 | 0 | 1 | 1 | 0 | 0 | 0 | X | X | 3 |
| British Columbia (Daniels) 🔨 | 2 | 0 | 3 | 0 | 0 | 1 | 1 | 2 | X | X | 9 |

| Sheet E | 1 | 2 | 3 | 4 | 5 | 6 | 7 | 8 | 9 | 10 | Final |
|---|---|---|---|---|---|---|---|---|---|---|---|
| New Brunswick (Comeau) 🔨 | 0 | 2 | 1 | 0 | 0 | 1 | 1 | 1 | 0 | 1 | 7 |
| Newfoundland and Labrador (Kearley) | 0 | 0 | 0 | 2 | 1 | 0 | 0 | 0 | 2 | 0 | 5 |

| Sheet F | 1 | 2 | 3 | 4 | 5 | 6 | 7 | 8 | 9 | 10 | Final |
|---|---|---|---|---|---|---|---|---|---|---|---|
| Northwest Territories (McKay-Saturnino) | 0 | 0 | 1 | 2 | 1 | 0 | 1 | 0 | 2 | X | 7 |
| Ontario (Smith) 🔨 | 1 | 3 | 0 | 0 | 0 | 3 | 0 | 4 | 0 | X | 11 |

==== Draw 6 ====
Wednesday, February 25, 15:00

| Sheet A | 1 | 2 | 3 | 4 | 5 | 6 | 7 | 8 | 9 | 10 | Final |
|---|---|---|---|---|---|---|---|---|---|---|---|
| Alberta (Maschmeyer) 🔨 | 0 | 0 | 1 | 0 | 0 | 0 | 3 | 0 | 2 | X | 6 |
| Manitoba (Bevan) | 0 | 0 | 0 | 1 | 0 | 1 | 0 | 1 | 0 | X | 3 |

| Sheet C | 1 | 2 | 3 | 4 | 5 | 6 | 7 | 8 | 9 | 10 | Final |
|---|---|---|---|---|---|---|---|---|---|---|---|
| Saskatchewan (Jones) 🔨 | 0 | 0 | 4 | 2 | 1 | 0 | 3 | 1 | X | X | 11 |
| Yukon (Meger) | 2 | 0 | 0 | 0 | 0 | 0 | 0 | 0 | X | X | 2 |

| Sheet E | 1 | 2 | 3 | 4 | 5 | 6 | 7 | 8 | 9 | 10 | Final |
|---|---|---|---|---|---|---|---|---|---|---|---|
| British Columbia (Daniels) 🔨 | 0 | 1 | 0 | 1 | 1 | 0 | 0 | 2 | 0 | X | 5 |
| Ontario (Smith) | 2 | 0 | 1 | 0 | 0 | 2 | 0 | 0 | 2 | X | 7 |

| Sheet F | 1 | 2 | 3 | 4 | 5 | 6 | 7 | 8 | 9 | 10 | Final |
|---|---|---|---|---|---|---|---|---|---|---|---|
| Nunavut (Pinksen) | 0 | 2 | 0 | 0 | 0 | 0 | 2 | 0 | 0 | X | 4 |
| Prince Edward Island (Mackay) 🔨 | 2 | 0 | 0 | 1 | 1 | 2 | 0 | 2 | 1 | X | 9 |

==== Draw 7 ====
Thursday, February 26, 9:00

| Sheet A | 1 | 2 | 3 | 4 | 5 | 6 | 7 | 8 | 9 | 10 | Final |
|---|---|---|---|---|---|---|---|---|---|---|---|
| Ontario (Smith) 🔨 | 0 | 3 | 1 | 0 | 3 | 1 | 0 | 4 | X | X | 12 |
| Yukon (Meger) | 1 | 0 | 0 | 1 | 0 | 0 | 2 | 0 | X | X | 4 |

| Sheet B | 1 | 2 | 3 | 4 | 5 | 6 | 7 | 8 | 9 | 10 | Final |
|---|---|---|---|---|---|---|---|---|---|---|---|
| Quebec (Gagné) | 2 | 0 | 3 | 1 | 5 | 1 | 1 | 0 | X | X | 13 |
| Newfoundland and Labrador (Kearley) 🔨 | 0 | 1 | 0 | 0 | 0 | 0 | 0 | 2 | X | X | 3 |

| Sheet C | 1 | 2 | 3 | 4 | 5 | 6 | 7 | 8 | 9 | 10 | Final |
|---|---|---|---|---|---|---|---|---|---|---|---|
| Nova Scotia (Fay) | 0 | 0 | 2 | 1 | 1 | 1 | 2 | 0 | 0 | X | 7 |
| New Brunswick (Comeau) 🔨 | 1 | 1 | 0 | 0 | 0 | 0 | 0 | 1 | 2 | X | 5 |

| Sheet E | 1 | 2 | 3 | 4 | 5 | 6 | 7 | 8 | 9 | 10 | 11 | Final |
|---|---|---|---|---|---|---|---|---|---|---|---|---|
| Prince Edward Island (Mackay) 🔨 | 0 | 0 | 1 | 0 | 1 | 0 | 2 | 0 | 1 | 1 | 0 | 6 |
| Northwest Territories (McKay-Saturnino) | 1 | 0 | 0 | 2 | 0 | 1 | 0 | 2 | 0 | 0 | 3 | 9 |

| Sheet F | 1 | 2 | 3 | 4 | 5 | 6 | 7 | 8 | 9 | 10 | Final |
|---|---|---|---|---|---|---|---|---|---|---|---|
| British Columbia (Daniels) | 1 | 0 | 0 | 3 | 0 | 2 | 0 | 0 | 1 | 1 | 8 |
| Saskatchewan (Jones) 🔨 | 0 | 1 | 1 | 0 | 1 | 0 | 0 | 3 | 0 | 0 | 6 |

==== Tie-Breakers ====
Thursday, February 26, 15:00

| Team | 1 | 2 | 3 | 4 | 5 | 6 | 7 | 8 | 9 | 10 | Final |
|---|---|---|---|---|---|---|---|---|---|---|---|
| Manitoba (Bevan) 🔨 | 0 | 0 | 0 | 1 | 1 | 0 | 0 | 0 | X | X | 2 |
| New Brunswick (Comeau) | 0 | 2 | 2 | 0 | 0 | 2 | 2 | 2 | X | X | 10 |

Thursday, February 26, 20:30

| Team | 1 | 2 | 3 | 4 | 5 | 6 | 7 | 8 | 9 | 10 | Final |
|---|---|---|---|---|---|---|---|---|---|---|---|
| Quebec (Gagné) | 1 | 0 | 0 | 0 | 3 | 0 | 0 | 1 | 0 | X | 5 |
| New Brunswick (Comeau) 🔨 | 0 | 1 | 1 | 1 | 0 | 2 | 2 | 0 | 2 | X | 9 |

=== Crossover ===
Friday, February 27, 12:00

| Sheet A | 1 | 2 | 3 | 4 | 5 | 6 | 7 | 8 | 9 | 10 | Final |
|---|---|---|---|---|---|---|---|---|---|---|---|
| Northwest Territories (McKay-Saturnino) | 0 | 0 | 0 | 0 | 2 | 0 | 0 | 1 | X | X | 3 |
| Manitoba (Bevan) 🔨 | 0 | 2 | 2 | 2 | 0 | 2 | 1 | 0 | X | X | 9 |

| Sheet C | 1 | 2 | 3 | 4 | 5 | 6 | 7 | 8 | 9 | 10 | Final |
|---|---|---|---|---|---|---|---|---|---|---|---|
| Prince Edward Island (Mackay) 🔨 | 0 | 1 | 0 | 1 | 0 | 0 | 1 | 0 | 3 | 2 | 8 |
| Quebec (Gagné) | 1 | 0 | 1 | 0 | 0 | 2 | 0 | 3 | 0 | 0 | 7 |

| Sheet E | 1 | 2 | 3 | 4 | 5 | 6 | 7 | 8 | 9 | 10 | Final |
|---|---|---|---|---|---|---|---|---|---|---|---|
| Nunavut (Pinksen) | 1 | 0 | 3 | 2 | 0 | 0 | 1 | 0 | 1 | 0 | 8 |
| Newfoundland and Labrador (Kearley) 🔨 | 0 | 2 | 0 | 0 | 4 | 2 | 0 | 0 | 0 | 3 | 11 |

Friday, February 27, 19:00

| Sheet A | Final |
| Yukon (Meger) | 9 |
| Newfoundland and Labrador (Kearley) | 11 |

| Sheet E | 1 | 2 | 3 | 4 | 5 | 6 | 7 | 8 | 9 | 10 | 11 | Final |
|---|---|---|---|---|---|---|---|---|---|---|---|---|
| Prince Edward Island (Mackay) | 0 | 1 | 0 | 0 | 1 | 0 | 0 | 0 | 0 | 3 | 1 | 6 |
| Manitoba (Bevan) 🔨 | 0 | 0 | 0 | 0 | 0 | 1 | 2 | 0 | 2 | 0 | 0 | 5 |

| Sheet F | 1 | 2 | 3 | 4 | 5 | 6 | 7 | 8 | 9 | 10 | Final |
|---|---|---|---|---|---|---|---|---|---|---|---|
| Northwest Territories (McKay-Saturnino) | 0 | 0 | 1 | 0 | 0 | 1 | 1 | 0 | 2 | X | 5 |
| Quebec (Gagné) 🔨 | 2 | 2 | 0 | 1 | 1 | 0 | 0 | 1 | 0 | X | 7 |

Saturday, February 21, 9:00

| Sheet B | 1 | 2 | 3 | 4 | 5 | 6 | 7 | 8 | 9 | 10 | Final |
|---|---|---|---|---|---|---|---|---|---|---|---|
| Manitoba (Bevan) | 0 | 2 | 1 | 0 | 3 | 2 | 1 | 0 | X | X | 9 |
| Quebec (Gagné) | 0 | 0 | 0 | 2 | 0 | 0 | 0 | 0 | X | X | 2 |

| Sheet D | 1 | 2 | 3 | 4 | 5 | 6 | 7 | 8 | 9 | 10 | Final |
|---|---|---|---|---|---|---|---|---|---|---|---|
| Yukon (Meger) | 1 | 0 | 0 | 1 | 0 | 1 | 0 | 0 | 3 | 0 | 6 |
| Nunavut (Pinksen) 🔨 | 0 | 1 | 1 | 0 | 1 | 0 | 2 | 1 | 0 | 1 | 7 |

| Sheet E | 1 | 2 | 3 | 4 | 5 | 6 | 7 | 8 | 9 | 10 | Final |
|---|---|---|---|---|---|---|---|---|---|---|---|
| Prince Edward Island (Mackay) | 0 | 0 | 2 | 0 | 0 | 1 | 0 | 0 | 0 | X | 3 |
| Northwest Territories (McKay-Saturnino) 🔨 | 1 | 1 | 0 | 1 | 1 | 0 | 0 | 3 | 1 | X | 8 |

=== Playoffs ===
Quarterfinals
B2 | Alberta | 5
A3 | Saskatchewan | 6
B3 | New Brunswick | 9
A2 | British Columbia | 4

Semifinals
A1 | Ontario | 8
A3 | Saskatchewan | 3
B1 | Nova Scotia | 7
B3 | New Brunswick | 6

Final
A1 | Ontario | 6
B1 | Nova Scotia | 5

| Bronze Medal Game |
| A3 | Saskatchewan | 9 |
| B3 | New Brunswick | 8 |

| Fifth Place Game |
| B2 | Alberta | 8 |
| A2 | British Columbia | 9 |

==== Quarterfinals ====
Friday, February 27, 12:00

| Sheet B | 1 | 2 | 3 | 4 | 5 | 6 | 7 | 8 | 9 | 10 | Final |
|---|---|---|---|---|---|---|---|---|---|---|---|
| Alberta (Maschmeyer) | 0 | 0 | 0 | 2 | 0 | 0 | 2 | 1 | 0 | 0 | 5 |
| Saskatchewan (Jones) 🔨 | 0 | 2 | 0 | 0 | 1 | 1 | 0 | 0 | 1 | 1 | 6 |

| Sheet D | 1 | 2 | 3 | 4 | 5 | 6 | 7 | 8 | 9 | 10 | Final |
|---|---|---|---|---|---|---|---|---|---|---|---|
| New Brunswick (Comeau) 🔨 | 1 | 1 | 0 | 2 | 0 | 3 | 2 | 0 | X | X | 9 |
| British Columbia (Daniels) | 0 | 0 | 1 | 0 | 2 | 0 | 0 | 1 | X | X | 4 |

==== Semifinals ====
Friday, February 27, 19:00

| Sheet B | 1 | 2 | 3 | 4 | 5 | 6 | 7 | 8 | 9 | 10 | Final |
|---|---|---|---|---|---|---|---|---|---|---|---|
| New Brunswick (Comeau) | 0 | 0 | 0 | 1 | 1 | 1 | 1 | 0 | 2 | 0 | 6 |
| Nova Scotia (Fay) 🔨 | 1 | 1 | 2 | 0 | 0 | 0 | 0 | 2 | 0 | 1 | 7 |

| Sheet D | 1 | 2 | 3 | 4 | 5 | 6 | 7 | 8 | 9 | 10 | Final |
|---|---|---|---|---|---|---|---|---|---|---|---|
| Saskatchewan (Jones) 🔨 | 0 | 0 | 1 | 2 | 0 | 0 | 0 | 0 | 0 | X | 3 |
| Ontario (Smith) | 0 | 0 | 0 | 0 | 1 | 2 | 1 | 1 | 3 | X | 8 |

==== Fifth Place Game ====
Saturday, February 28, 9:00

| Sheet F | 1 | 2 | 3 | 4 | 5 | 6 | 7 | 8 | 9 | 10 | Final |
|---|---|---|---|---|---|---|---|---|---|---|---|
| Alberta (Maschmeyer) 🔨 | 1 | 0 | 1 | 0 | 2 | 0 | 1 | 0 | 2 | 1 | 8 |
| British Columbia (Daniels) | 0 | 4 | 0 | 1 | 0 | 2 | 0 | 2 | 0 | 0 | 9 |

==== Bronze Medal Game ====
Saturday, February 28, 13:00

| Sheet C | 1 | 2 | 3 | 4 | 5 | 6 | 7 | 8 | 9 | 10 | 11 | Final |
|---|---|---|---|---|---|---|---|---|---|---|---|---|
| Saskatchewan (Jones) | 0 | 2 | 0 | 2 | 0 | 0 | 0 | 4 | 0 | 0 | 1 | 9 |
| New Brunswick (Comeau) 🔨 | 2 | 0 | 2 | 0 | 0 | 0 | 2 | 0 | 1 | 1 | 0 | 8 |

==== Gold Medal Game ====
Saturday, February 28, 17:00

| Sheet C | 1 | 2 | 3 | 4 | 5 | 6 | 7 | 8 | 9 | 10 | 11 | Final |
|---|---|---|---|---|---|---|---|---|---|---|---|---|
| Ontario (Smith) 🔨 | 1 | 0 | 1 | 0 | 0 | 1 | 0 | 0 | 2 | 0 | 1 | 6 |
| Nova Scotia (Fay) | 0 | 1 | 0 | 0 | 1 | 0 | 1 | 1 | 0 | 1 | 0 | 5 |

=== Final standings ===
| Province | Rank |
|---|---|
| Ontario | 1st place, gold medalist(s) |
| Nova Scotia | 2nd place, silver medalist(s) |
| Saskatchewan | 3rd place, bronze medalist(s) |
| New Brunswick | 4 |
| British Columbia | 5 |
| Alberta | 6 |
| Manitoba | 7 |
| Quebec | 8 |
| Northwest Territories | 9 |
| Prince Edward Island | 10 |
| Nunavut | 11 |
| Newfoundland and Labrador | 12 |
| Yukon | 13 |
