= 2016 Canadian Junior Curling Championships =

- Host city: Stratford, Ontario
- Arena: Stratford Rotary Complex
- Dates: January 23–31
- Men's winner: Manitoba
- Curling club: Granite CC, Winnipeg
- Skip: Matt Dunstone
- Third: Colton Lott
- Second: Kyle Doering
- Lead: Rob Gordon
- Finalist: Northern Ontario (Tanner Horgan)
- Women's winner: Nova Scotia
- Curling club: Chester CC, Chester
- Skip: Mary Fay
- Third: Kristin Clarke
- Second: Karlee Burgess
- Lead: Janique LeBlanc
- Finalist: British Columbia (Sarah Daniels)

The 2016 Canadian Junior Curling Championships were held from January 23 to 31 at the Stratford Rotary Complex. The winners represented Canada at the 2016 World Junior Curling Championships in Copenhagen, Denmark.

== Men ==
=== Round-robin standings ===
Final round-robin standings

Key
Teams to Championship Pool
Teams to Tie-Breakers

Pool A	Skip	W	L
Manitoba	Matt Dunstone	6	0
Quebec	Félix Asselin	4	2
Ontario	Doug Kee	4	2
Alberta	Karsten Sturmay	3	3
Nova Scotia	Matthew Manuel	2	4
Newfoundland and Labrador	Greg Smith	2	4
Nunavut	Arthur Siksik	0	6

Pool B	Skip	W	L
British Columbia	Tyler Tardi	6	0
Northern Ontario	Tanner Horgan	5	1
New Brunswick	Alex Robichaud	4	2
Saskatchewan	Jacob Hersikorn	3	3
Prince Edward Island	Matthew MacLean	2	4
Northwest Territories	Matthew Miller	1	5
Yukon	Brayden Klassen	0	6

=== Championship pool standings ===
After Round-robin standings

Key
Teams to Playoffs

Province	Skip	W	L
Northern Ontario	Tanner Horgan	9	1
Manitoba	Matt Dunstone	9	1
British Columbia	Tyler Tardi	7	3
Quebec	Félix Asselin	6	4
Alberta	Karsten Sturmay	6	4
Saskatchewan	Jacob Hersikorn	5	5
Ontario	Doug Kee	5	5
New Brunswick	Alex Robichaud	4	6

=== Playoffs ===
Semifinal			Final
			1	Northern Ontario	4
2	Manitoba	8	2	Manitoba	11
3	British Columbia	3

=== Semifinal ===
Saturday, January 30, 19:00

Team	1	2	3	4	5	6	7	8	9	10	Final
Manitoba (Dunstone) 🔨	0	1	0	2	1	1	0	1	2	X	8
British Columbia (Tardi)	1	0	1	0	0	0	1	0	0	X	3

Player percentages
Manitoba		British Columbia	
Rob Gordon	83%	Nick Meister	86%
Kyle Doering	94%	Jordan Tardi	81%
Colton Lott	94%	Daniel Wenzek	78%
Matt Dunstone	92%	Tyler Tardi	65%
Total	91%	Total	77%

=== Final ===
Sunday, January 31, 15:00

Team	1	2	3	4	5	6	7	8	9	10	Final
Northern Ontario (Horgan) 🔨	2	0	0	0	1	0	1	0	X	X	4
Manitoba (Dunstone)	0	3	3	1	0	3	0	1	X	X	11

Player percentages
Northern Ontario		Manitoba	
Maxime Blais	98%	Rob Gordon	97%
Nicholas Bissonnette	81%	Kyle Doering	100%
Jacob Horgan	64%	Colton Lott	91%
Tanner Horgan	70%	Matt Dunstone	97%
Total	79%	Total	96%

== Women ==
=== Round-robin standings ===
Final round-robin standings

Key
Teams to Championship Pool

Pool A	Skip	W	L
New Brunswick	Justine Comeau	5	1
Manitoba	Abby Ackland	5	1
Alberta	Selena Sturmay	4	2
Quebec	Laurie St-Georges	4	2
Northern Ontario	Megan Smith	2	4
Nunavut	Sadie Pinksen	1	5
Northwest Territories	Zoey Walsh	0	6

Pool B	Skip	W	L
British Columbia	Sarah Daniels	6	0
Nova Scotia	Mary Fay	5	1
Saskatchewan	Kourtney Fesser	4	2
Ontario	Courtney Auld	3	3
Prince Edward Island	Katie Fullerton	2	4
Yukon	Alyssa Meger	1	5
Newfoundland and Labrador	Brooke Godsland	0	6

=== Championship pool standings ===
Final round-robin standings

Key
Teams to Playoffs
Teams to Tiebreaker

Province	Skip	W	L
Nova Scotia	Mary Fay	9	1
British Columbia	Sarah Daniels	8	2
New Brunswick	Justine Comeau	7	3
Manitoba	Abby Ackland	7	3
Alberta	Selena Sturmay	6	4
Quebec	Laurie St-Georges	6	4
Ontario	Courtney Auld	5	5
Saskatchewan	Kourtney Fesser	4	6

=== Playoffs ===
Semifinal			Final
			1	Nova Scotia	9
2	British Columbia	7	2	British Columbia	5
3	New Brunswick	3

=== Semifinal ===
Saturday, January 30, 14:00

Team	1	2	3	4	5	6	7	8	9	10	Final
British Columbia (Daniels) 🔨	0	0	2	2	0	0	2	0	1	X	7
New Brunswick (Comeau)	0	1	0	0	0	1	0	1	0	X	3

Player percentages
British Columbia		New Brunswick	
Megan Daniels	71%	Keira McLaughlin	84%
Dezaray Hawes	100%	Brigitte Comeau	75%
Marika Van Osch	88%	Emma Le Blanc	78%
Sarah Daniels	86%	Justine Comeau	71%
Total	87%	Total	77%

=== Final ===
Sunday, January 31, 10:00

Team	1	2	3	4	5	6	7	8	9	10	Final
Nova Scotia (Fay) 🔨	1	0	2	2	0	0	0	2	2	X	9
British Columbia (Daniels)	0	2	0	0	1	1	1	0	0	X	5

Player percentages
Nova Scotia		British Columbia	
Janique LeBlanc	72%	Megan Daniels	84%
Karlee Burgess	80%	Dezaray Hawes	76%
Kristin Clarke	70%	Marika Van Osch	76%
Mary Fay	80%	Sarah Daniels	60%
Total	75%	Total	74%

== Awards ==
The all-star teams and award winners are as follows:

=== All-Star teams ===
Women

First Team

- Skip: Sarah Daniels, British Columbia 81%
- Third: Marika Van Osch, British Columbia 86%
- Second: Megan Moffat, Alberta 85%
- Lead: Sara Oliver, Manitoba 84%

Second Team

- Skip: Selena Sturmay, Alberta 80%
- Third: Kristin Clarke, Nova Scotia 85%
- Second: Melissa Gordon, Manitoba 84%
- Lead: Hope Sunley, Alberta 84%

Men

First Team

- Skip: Matt Dunstone, Manitoba 90%
- Third: Colton Lott, Manitoba 88%
- Second: Kyle Doering, Manitoba 89%
- Lead: Nick Neufeld, Saskatchewan 89%

Second Team

- Skip: Tanner Horgan, Northern Ontario 89%
- Third: Jason Camm, Ontario 85%
- Second: Matthew Hall, Ontario 87%
- Lead: Curtis Easter, Ontario 87%

=== Ken Watson Sportsmanship Awards ===
Women

- Chloé McCloskey, Prince Edward Island

Men

- Arthur Siksik, Nunavut

=== Fair Play Awards ===
Women

- Lead: Aleya Quilty, Prince Edward Island
- Second: Dezaray Hawes, British Columbia
- Third: Christianne West, Nunavut
- Skip: Courtney Auld, Ontario
- Coach: Michel St-Georges, Quebec

Men

- Lead: Rob Gordon, Manitoba
- Second: Kyle Barron, Newfoundland and Labrador
- Third: Daniel Wenzek, British Columbia
- Skip: Karsten Sturmay, Alberta
- Coach: Benoit Forget, Quebec

=== ASHAM National Coaching Awards ===
Women

- Michel St-Georges, Quebec

Men

- Benoit Forget, Quebec

=== Joan Mead Legacy Awards ===
Women

- Gabby Molloy, Newfoundland and Labrador

Men

- Karsten Sturmay, Alberta

== Qualification ==
=== Newfoundland and Labrador ===
The Junior Provincials were held January 6–10 at the Re/Max CC in St. John's (women's) and January 3–6 at the Corner Brook Curling Club in Corner Brook (men's). Junior Women's was a double round robin between the three teams qualified; Junior Men's was a single round robin. For the playoffs, the Junior Men's division had the top three teams advancing to the playoffs. The Junior Women's division had the top two teams advancing to the playoffs. If a team goes undefeated in the round robin, they must be beaten twice in the playoffs.

Results:

Men's	W	L
Greg Smith (Caribou)	3	2
Stephen Trickett (Re/Max)	3	2
Nick O'Neill (Corner Brook)	3	2
Andrew Taylor (Re/Max)	3	2
Andrew Lawrence (Re/Max)	2	3
Greg Blyde (Re/Max)	1	4

Women's	W	L
Brooke Godsland (Re/Max)	3	1
Sarah Hill (Re/Max)	2	2
Rebecca Roberts (Re/Max)	1	3

- Men's tiebreaker: Trickett 9 - O'Neill 2
- Men's tiebreaker: Smith 6 - Taylor 5
- Men's quarter final: O'Neill 7 - Taylor 3
- Men's semi final: Trickett 10 - O'Neill 4
- Men's final: Smith 7 - Trickett 6
- Women's final: Godsland 9 - Hill 8

=== Nova Scotia ===
The Mackie's NS Junior Provincials were held December 27–31 at the Lakeshore Curling Club in Sackville. The event is a modified triple knock-out qualifying three teams in a modified playoff.

Pre-Playoff Results:

Men's	W	L
Matthew Manuel (Mayflower)	6	1
Adam Cocks (Chester)	4	2
Matt Jackson (Mayflower)	4	3
Graeme Weagle (Chester)	3	3
Sebastien LeFort (Sydney)	1	3
Liam Moore (CFB Halifax)	1	3
Evan McDonah (Truro)	1	3
Alex Campbell (Northumberland)	1	3

Women's	W	L
Mary Fay (Chester)	6	1
Isabelle Ladouceur (Lakeshore)	5	2
Emily Ball (Lakeshore)	3	3
Carina McKay-Saturnino (Mayflower)	3	3
Mandi Newhook (Lakeshore)	2	3
Hayley McCabe (NSCA)	2	3
Kristen Lind (Dartmouth)	0	3
Ashley Francis (Highlander)	0	3

Playoff results:

- Men's semi final: Manuel 8 - Cocks 4
- Men's final (N/A): Manuel vs Manuel
- Women's semi final: Fay 9 - Ladouceur 1
- Women's final (N/A): Fay vs Fay

=== Prince Edward Island ===
The Pepsi PEI Provincial Junior Curling Championships were held December 27–30 at the Western Community Curling Club in Alberton.

The juniors will play a modified triple-knockout format, which will qualify three teams for a championship round.

Pre-Playoff results:

Men's	W	L
Matthew MacLean (Maple Leaf/Cornwall)	3	2
Tyler Smith (Montague/Crapaud)	3	2
Alex MacFadyen (Silver Fox)	5	2
Leslie Noye (Western)	1	3
Devin Schut (Cornwall)	0	3

Women's	W	L
Katie Fullerton (Cornwall)	4	0
Lauren Lenentine (Cornwall)	3	3
Lauren Moerike (Cornwall)	1	3
Alyssa Wright (Montague/Crapaud)	1	3

Playoff results:

- Men's semi final: Smith 5 - MacFadyen 3
- Men's final: MacLean 6 - Smith 3
- Women's semi final (N/A): Fullerton vs Fullerton
- Women's final (N/A): Fullerton vs Fullerton

=== New Brunswick ===
The O'Leary Junior Provincial Championships are being held December 28–31 at the Riverside Country Club in Rothesay. The event is a modified triple knockout, qualifying three teams in a modified playoff.

Results:

Men's	W	L
Layton MacCabe (Moncton)	5	2
Jack Smeltzer (Capital Winter)	5	2
Alex Robichaud (Moncton)	4	2
Rene Comeau (Fredericton)	3	3
Liam Marin (Thistle)	2	3
Adam Tracy (Fredericton)	1	3
Trevor Crouse (Riverside)	1	3
Josh Vaughan (Riverside)	0	3

Women's	W	L
Samantha Crook (Gage)	5	1
Justine Comeau (Fredericton)	5	2
Danielle Hubbard (Miramichi)	4	3
Molli Ward (Sackville)	3	3
Katelyn Kelly (Fredericton)	0	3
Erica Cluff (Woodstock)	0	3

- Men's semi final: Smeltzer 6 - Robichaud 8
- Men's final: MacCabe 5 - Robichaud 6
- Women's semi final: Crook 1 - Comeau 8
- Women's final: Crook 3 - Comeau 6

=== Quebec ===
The Championnat Provincial Junior Brosse Performance are being held from January 4–8 at the Club de curling Montréal Ouest in Montréal.

The event is a round-robin with a modified playoff.

Men's	W	L
Félix Asselin (Glenmore)	7	0
Marc-Alexandre Dion (Trois-Rivières)	5	2
Vincent Roberge (Etchemin/Rimouski)	5	2
Antoine Provencher (Laval-sur-le-Lac)	4	3
Louis Quevillon (Lacolle)	3	4
Jérôme Adam (Belvédère/Noranda)	2	5
Jesse Mullen (Kénogami/St-Felicien)	1	6
Thomas Lo (TMR)	1	6

Women's	W	L
Laurie St-Georges (Laval-sur-le-Lac)	6	0
Dominique Jean (Montréal-Ouest/Laviolette)	5	1
Gabrielle Lavoie (Victoria)	3	3
Geneviève Laurier (Etchemin/Laurier)	3	3
Isabelle Fleury (Chicoutimi)	2	4
Émilia Gagné (Riverbend)	1	5
Sophie Legler (Aurèle-Racine)	1	5

- Men's semi final: Dion 4 - Roberge 9
- Men's final: Asselin 9 - Roberge 5
- Women's tiebreaker: Laurier 4 - Lavoie 7
- Women's semi final: Jean 7 - Lavoie 6
- Women's final: St-Georges 8 - Jean 6

=== Ontario ===
The Pepsi Ontario Junior Curling Championships were held January 6–10 at the Mississaugua Golf & Country Club in Mississauga.

Results:

Men's	W	L
Doug Kee (Navan)	7	0
Pascal Michaud (Annandale)	5	2
Mac Calwell (Quinte)	5	2
Steven Molnar (Oakville)	4	3
James Harris (Paris)	3	4
Kieran Scott (Guelph)	3	4
Graham Singer (Collingwood)	1	6
Russell Cuddie (London)	0	7

Women's	W	L
Courtney Auld (Bayview)	5	2
Kirsten Marshall (London)	5	2
Jestyn Murphy (Mississaugua)	5	2
Molly Greenwood (K-W)	4	3
Lauren Horton (Almonte)	3	4
Marie-Elaine Little (RCMP)	2	5
Chelsea Brandwood (Glendale)	2	5
Breanna Rozon (Acton)	2	5

- Men's semi final: Michaud 3 - Calwell 4
- Men's final: Kee 10 - Calwell 3
- Women's semi final: Marshall 6 - Murphy 5
- Women's final: Auld 7 - Marshall 5

=== Northern Ontario ===
The Junior Provincial Championships are being held January 2–5 at the Kakabeka Falls CC (Men's) and Sioux Lookout CC (Women's).

Results:

Men's	W	L
Tanner Horgan (Copper Cliff)	7	0
Josh Vanderberg (Community First)	4	3
Nicholas Lemieux (Community First)	4	3
Ian Fudge (Fort William)	4	3
Matthew Roberts (Kakebeka Falls)	4	3
Zach Warkentin (Keewatin)	4	3
Connor Mangoff (Fort William)	1	6
Aaron Soulliere (Thessalon)	0	7

Women's	W	L
Krysta Burns (Idylwylde)	7	0
Megan Smith (Sudbury)	5	2
Tiana Geaudry (Port Arthur)	4	3
Hailey Beaudry (Fort Frances)	4	3
Camille Daly (Copper Cliff)	4	3
Hayley Horton (Blind River)	3	4
Cassidy Romyn (Sioux Lookout)	1	6
Ashley Payne (Fort Frances)	0	7

- Men's Tiebreaker A: Lemieux 6 - Roberts 4
- Men's Tiebreaker B: Warkentin 4 - Fudge 7
- Men's Tiebreaker C: Lemieux 9 - Fudge 3
- Men's semi final: Vanderberg 11 - Lemieux 2
- Men's final: Horgan 6 - Vanderberg 3
- Women's Tiebreaker 1: Beaudry 9 - Daly 8
- Women's Tiebreaker 2: Geaudry 10 - Beaudry 2
- Women's semi final: Smith 8 - Geaudry 1
- Women's final: Burns 4 - Smith 8

=== Manitoba ===
The Canola Junior Provincial Championships are being held January 6–11 at the Riverdale Community Centre in Rivers

Results:

Men's	W	L
Asham Black Group
Matt Dunstone (Granite)	7	0
Derek Oryniak (Granite)	5	2
Devon Wiebe (Pembina)	5	2
Shayne MacGranachan (Brandon)	4	3
Carter Watkins (Swan River)	3	4
Ryan Wiebe (St. Vital)	3	4
Dustin Pratcshler (La Salle)	1	6
Matthew Stewart (Burntwood)	0	7
Extreme Force Red Group
JT Ryan (AMCC)	7	0
Braden Calvert (Deer Lodge)	6	1
Brett Walter (Granite)	5	2
Braden Forrester (Fort Rouge)	3	4
Jordan Peters (Morris)	3	4
Thomas Dunlop (Stonewall)	2	5
Chase Dusessoy (Brandon)	2	5
Tyson Roeland (Springfield)	0	7

Women's	W	L
Asham Black Group
Mackenzie Zacharias (Altona)	6	1
Kristy Watling (East St. Paul)	5	2
Rebecca Lamb (Stonewall)	5	2
Brooke Friesen (Winkler)	4	3
Hannah Brown (Fort Rouge)	4	3
Kathryn Cullen (Beausejour)	3	4
Stacy Sime (Dauphin)	1	6
Kahli Wedderburn (Rivers)	0	7
Extreme Force Red Group
Laura Burtnyk (AMCC)	7	0
Abby Ackland (Fort Rouge)	5	2
Kaitlin Payette (Brandon)	4	3
Christine Mackay (Fort Rouge)	4	3
Shae Bevan (Elmwood)	3	4
Randine Baker (St. Vital)	3	4
Emma Jensen (Dauphin)	2	5
Hanne Jensen (Dauphin)	0	7

- Men's tiebreaker: Wiebe 3 - Oryniak 4
- Men's B1 vs R1: Dunstone 7 - Ryan 2
- Men's B2 vs R2: Oryniak 9 - Calvert 6
- Men's semi final: Ryan 5 - Oryniak 7
- Men's final: Dunstone 7 - Oryniak 4
- Women's tiebreaker: Watling 8 - Lamb 5
- Women's B1 vs R1: Zacharias 2 - Burtnyk 6
- Women's B2 vs R2: Watling 7 - Ackland 8
- Women's semi final: Zacharias 5 - Ackland 7
- Women's final: Burtnyk 4 - Ackland 7

=== Saskatchewan ===
The Junior Provincial Championships are being held January 2–6 at the Nutana Curling Club in Saskatoon.

Men's	W	L
Pool A
Jacob Hersikorn (Sutherland)	5	0
Garret Springer (Callie)	3	2
Judd Dlouhy (Assiniboia)	3	2
Carson Ackerman (Sutherland)	3	2
Wayne Leippi (Kronau)	1	4
Sam Wills (Lumsden)	0	5
Pool B
Ryan Kleiter (Sutherland)	5	0
Brayden Stewart (Maryfield)	4	1
Shawn Vereschagin (Sutherland)	3	2
Chad Lang (Nutana)	1	4
Brett Banadyga (Callie)	1	4
Tyson Williamson (Callie)	1	4

Women's	W	L
Pool A
Kourtney Fesser (Nutana)	5	0
Rae Williamson (Callie)	3	2
Eva Grabarczyk (Highland)	3	2
Chaelynn Kitz (Sutherland)	2	3
Megan Lamontagne (Lumsden)	1	4
Ashley Thevenot (Sutherland)	1	4
Pool B
Brooke Tokarz (Sutherland)	5	0
Kaitlyn Jones (Tartan)	4	1
Hanna Anderson (Sutherland)	3	2
Kaitlin Corbin (Moose Jaw)	2	3
Jade Kerr (Callie)	1	4
Karlee Fessler (Weyburn)	0	5

- Men's Tiebreaker 1: Dlouhy 5 - Ackerman 4
- Men's Tiebreaker 2: Springer 6 - Dlouhy 5
- Men's A1 vs. B1: Hersikorn 8 - Kleiter 2
- Men's A2 vs. B2: Springer 4 - Stewart 7
- Men's semi final: Kleiter 5 - Stewart 4
- Men's final: Hersikorn 5 - Kleiter 4
- Women's Tiebreaker: Grabarczyk 3 - Williamson 7
- Women's A1 vs. B1: Fesser 8 - Tokarz 5
- Women's A2 vs. B2: Williamson 3 - Jones 6
- Women's semi final: Tokarz 6 - Jones 5
- Women's final: Fesser 8 - Tokarz 3

=== Alberta ===
The Subway Junior Provincials are being held January 2–6 at the Wainwright Curling Club in Wainwright.

Results:

Men's	W	L
Jeremy Harty (Glencoe/Calgary)	7	0
Tyler Lautner (Calgary)	6	1
Karsten Sturmay (Saville)	5	2
Colton Goller (Lethbridge)	4	3
Lucas Bartz (Ellerslie)	3	4
Glenn Venance (Saville)	2	5
Lane Knievel (Manning)	1	6
Lyndin Stone (Manning)	0	7

Women's	W	L
Selena Sturmay (Airdrie)	7	0
Kristen Streifel (Saville)	5	2
Kayla Skrlik (Falher)	5	2
Veronica Maschmeyer (Ellerslie)	4	3
Amanda Moizis (Red Deer)	2	5
Janais DeJong (Grande Prairie)	2	5
Brenna Bilassy (Saville)	2	5
Allyson Hamilton (Taber)	1	6

- Men's semi final: Lautner 4 - Sturmay 6
- Men's final: Harty 4 - Sturmay 7
- Women's semi final: Streifel 5 - Skrlik 6
- Women's final: Sturmay 6 - Skrlik 5

=== British Columbia ===
The Tim Horton's Junior Provincial Championships were held December 29–January 3 at the Kamlooops Curling Club in Kamloops.

Results:

Men's	W	L
Tyler Tardi (Langley/Royal City)	7	0
Paul Henderson (Victoria)	6	1
Matthew McCrady (Royal City)	4	3
Thomas Love (Vernon)	3	4
Jordan Kiss (Royal City)	3	4
Brayden Carpenter (Royal City)	3	4
Connor Croteau (Kerry Park/Victoria)	1	6
Zane Bartlett (Grand Forks)	1	6

Women's	W	L
Corryn Brown (Kamloops)	7	0
Sarah Daniels (Royal City)	6	1
Mariah Coulombe (Victoria)	4	3
Sarah Loken (Delta Thistle)	4	3
Shawna Jensen (Tunnel Town)	3	4
Alysha Buchy (Kimberly)	2	5
Winter Harvey (Vernon)	1	6
Alyssa Connell (Prince George)	1	6

- Men's Tiebreaker 1: Love 7 - Carpenter 0
- Men's Tiebreaker 2: Kiss 7 - Love 8
- Men's 1 vs 2: Tardi 8 - Henderson 5
- Men's 3 vs 4: McCrady 10 - Love 6
- Men's Semi Final: Henderson 5 - McCrady 8
- Men's Final: Tardi 8 - McCrady 3
- Women's 1 vs 2: Brown 11 - Daniels 7
- Women's 3 vs 4: Coulombe 6 - Loken 8
- Women's Semi Final: Daniels 9 - Loken 4
- Women's Final: Brown 3 - Daniels 11

=== Yukon ===
- Men: Brayden Klassen (Whitehorse)
- Women: Alyssa Meger (Whitehorse)

=== Northwest Territories ===
- Men: Matthew Miller (Inuvik)
- Women: Zoey Walsh (Hay River)

=== Nunavut ===
- Men: Arthur Siksik (Qavik)
- Women: Sadie Pinksen (Iqaluit)
