= Mary Fay =

Canadian curler (born 1998)

- Curler
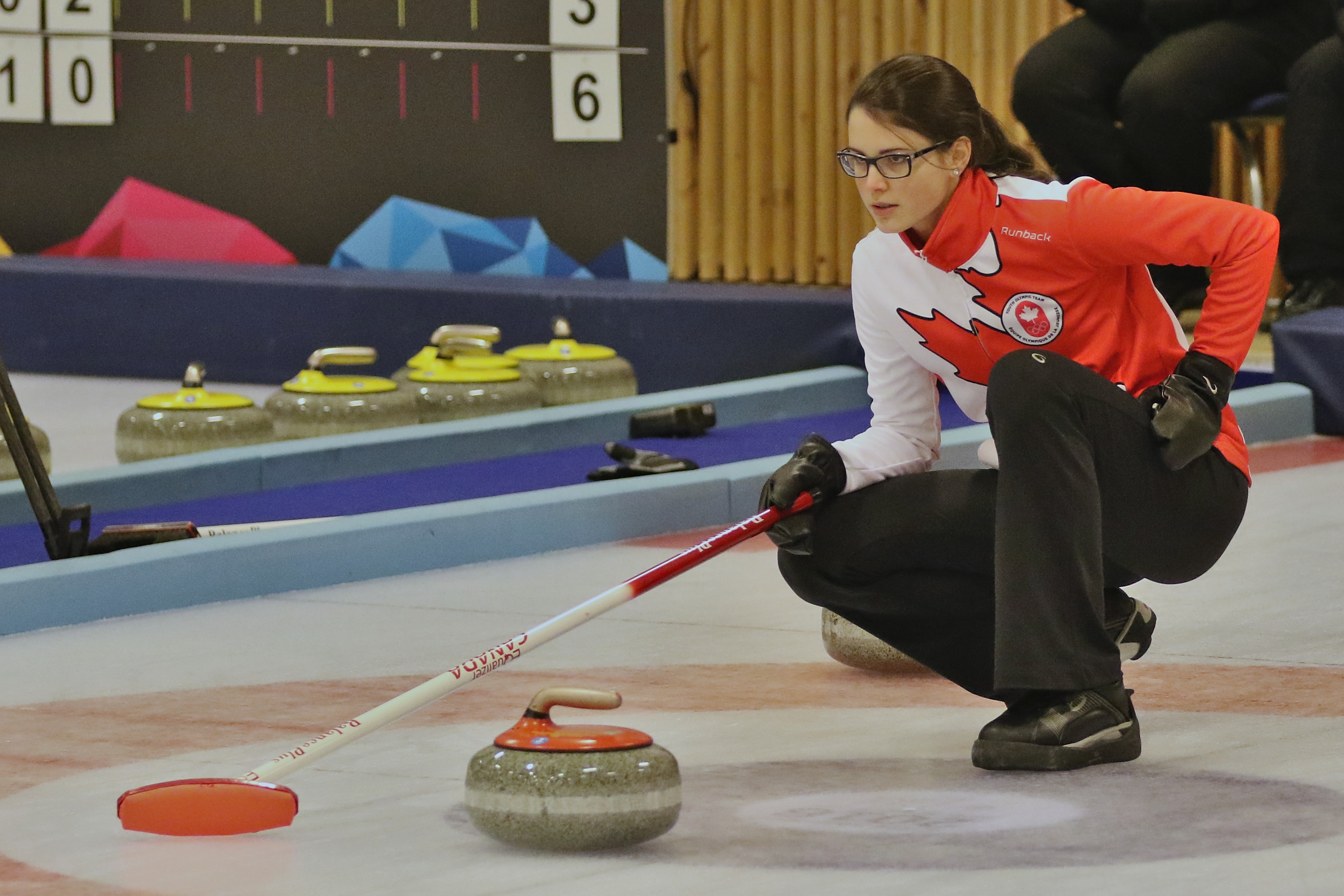
- Mary Fay at the 2016 Winter Youth Olympics
- Born: June 7, 1998 (age 28); Chester, Nova Scotia

Curling career
- Other appearances: CJCC: 3 (2014, 2015, 2016)
Medal record
Women's Curling
Representing Canada
Winter Youth Olympics
Gold medal – first place	2016 Lillehammer
World Junior Curling Championships
Gold medal – first place	2016 Copenhagen
Representing Nova Scotia
Canada Winter Games
Silver medal – second place	2015 Prince George

Mary Fay (born June 7, 1998) is a Canadian curler from Chester, Nova Scotia.

== Curling career ==
At just 15 years old, Fay and her young rink of Jenn Smith, Karlee Burgess and Janique LeBlanc won the 2014 Nova Scotia Junior women's championship. They were the youngest team to win in 20 years., sending the four-some to the 2014 Canadian Junior Curling Championships to represent Nova Scotia. Despite their youth, the team finished with an 8-2 record, making the playoffs. The team would go on to lose to British Columbia, skipped by Kalia Van Osch in the semi-final, winning a bronze medal. The next year, the Fay rink won their second U21 Nova Scotia Provincials, earning the right to represent Nova Scotia at their second back-to-back Canadian Junior Curling Championship. The rink fell one step shorter than their previous year, finishing in a tie for fourth place with a 6-4 record. The Fay rink then qualified for the 2016 Canadian Juniors with their third provincial title. The Fay rink finished in first place after the round robin with a 9-1 record, earning a direct bye to the finals. In the finals, she played British Columbia, skipped by Sarah Daniels, and won her first Canadian Junior title by defeating the British Columbia 9-5, and would go on to represent Canada at the 2016 World Juniors in Copenhagen, Denmark. In their first World Junior appearance, The Fay rink would go undefeated in the round robin, earning a spot in the 1-2 game against the United States rink, skipped by Cory Christensen. They would lose this game, but go on to win the semi-final against Hungary, setting up a rematch of the 1-2 game in the gold medal game. The Fay rink would go on to win the final 7-4, winning their first World Junior Championship.

Fay represented Nova Scotia at the 2015 Canada Winter Games after beating club mate Cassie Cocks 7-3 in the provincial final. While at the games Fay and her Nova Scotian team went undefeated through the Round Robin, finishing with a perfect 5-0 record. According to the announcers when their game against Manitoba was televised on TSN, the Fay rink had the highest player percentages at every position and the highest team percentage after the first two draws. Their perfect record in the Round Robin earned them a bye to the Semi Finals. They once again played New Brunswick's Justine Comeau, after defeating her 7-5 in the Round Robin, won on the last rock in the last end in a 7-6 decision. They went on to play Ontario in the Gold Medal Game, in which they lost 6-5 in an extra end.

Fay and second, Karlee Burgess along with B.C. curlers Tyler Tardi and Sterling Middleton were selected from curlers who competed in the Canada Winter Games to represent Canada in the 2016 Youth Olympics in Lillehammer, Norway. The rink, skipped by Fay went undefeated in the tournament, winning the gold medal after a resounding 10-4 win against the United States of America in the final.

Fay has also won three Under-15 provincial championships (2010, 2012, 2013) and won the 2013 Under-18 provincial championships, as well as the 2013 U-18 Atlantic Canadian Championships. Team Fay would play in their first World Curling Tour event at the 2014 Gibson's Cashspiel, where they lost in the final to Mary-Anne Arsenault. However, the team won their first women's event the next year, at the New Scotland Clothing Ladies Cashspiel, where they defeated Mary Mattatall in the final. The Fay rink qualified for their first Grand Slam of Curling tournament, competing at the 2016 Humpty's Champions Cup where the rink went 1-3, beating the reigning Scotties Champion Chelsea Carey.

On April 30, 2016, during the Sportsnet broadcast of the Champions Cup, it was announced that Fay would be "walking away" from curling after the completion of the 2015-16 curling season to focus on her future studies at Queen's University in the pursuit of studying medicine.

== Teams ==
Season	Skip	Third	Second	Lead
2009–10	Mary Fay	Allison Chandler	Alison Collicutt	Robyn Harris
2010–11	Mary Fay	Jenn Smith	Karlee Burgess	Janique LeBlanc
2011–12	Mary Fay	Jenn Smith	Karlee Burgess	Janique LeBlanc
2012–13	Mary Fay	Jenn Smith	Karlee Burgess	Janique LeBlanc
2013–14	Mary Fay	Jenn Smith	Karlee Burgess	Janique LeBlanc
2014–15	Mary Fay	Jenn Smith	Karlee Burgess	Janique LeBlanc
2015–16	Mary Fay	Kristin Clarke	Karlee Burgess	Janique LeBlanc
