= 2015 Canadian Junior Curling Championships =

2015 M&M Meat Shops Canadian Junior Curling Championships
- Host city: Corner Brook, Newfoundland and Labrador
- Arena: Corner Brook Civic Centre; Corner Brook Curling Club
- Dates: January 24–February 1
- Men's winner: Manitoba
- Curling club: Deer Lodge CC, Winnipeg
- Skip: Braden Calvert
- Third: Kyle Kurz
- Second: Lucas van den Bosch
- Lead: Brendan Wilson
- Finalist: Saskatchewan (Jacob Hersikorn)
- Women's winner: Alberta
- Curling club: Saville SC, Edmonton
- Skip: Kelsey Rocque
- Third: Danielle Schmiemann
- Second: Holly Jamieson
- Lead: Jessica Iles
- Finalist: Ontario (Chelsea Brandwood)

The 2015 M&M Meat Shops Canadian Junior Curling Championships were held from January 24 to February 1 at the Corner Brook Civic Centre and the Corner Brook Curling Club. The winners represented Canada at the 2015 World Junior Curling Championships in Tallinn, Estonia.

== Men ==
=== Round Robin Standings ===
Final Round Robin Standings

Key
Teams to Championship Pool
Teams to Tie-Breakers

Pool A	Skip	W	L
Quebec	Félix Asselin	6	0
Manitoba	Braden Calvert	5	1
British Columbia	Paul Henderson	4	2
Ontario	Mac Calwell	2	4
Nova Scotia	Matthew Manuel	2	4
Newfoundland and Labrador	Greg Smith	2	4
Nunavut	Kane Komaksiutiksak	0	6

Pool B	Skip	W	L
Alberta	Karsten Sturmay	5	1
Saskatchewan	Jacob Hersikorn	5	1
New Brunswick	Rene Comeau	5	1
Northern Ontario	Tanner Horgan	2	4
Prince Edward Island	Tyler Smith	2	4
Yukon	Joe Wallingham	2	4
Northwest Territories	Matthew Miller	0	6

=== Championship Pool Standings ===
Final Round Robin Standings

Key
Teams to Playoffs
Teams to Tie-Breaker

Province	Skip	W	L
Manitoba	Braden Calvert	9	1
New Brunswick	Rene Comeau	8	2
Saskatchewan	Jacob Hersikorn	7	3
Quebec	Félix Asselin	7	3
Alberta	Karsten Sturmay	7	3
Northern Ontario	Tanner Horgan	5	5
British Columbia	Paul Henderson	5	5
Ontario	Mac Calwell	2	8

=== Playoffs ===
Semifinal			Final
			1	Manitoba	8
2	New Brunswick	6	3	Saskatchewan	6
3	Saskatchewan	8

==== Semifinal ====
Sunday, February 1, 1:30 pm

Team	1	2	3	4	5	6	7	8	9	10	Final
New Brunswick (Comeau) 🔨	1	0	1	0	1	1	0	0	2	0	6
Saskatchewan (Hersikorn)	0	2	0	2	0	0	1	1	0	2	8

==== Final ====
Sunday, February 1, 8:00 pm

Team	1	2	3	4	5	6	7	8	9	10	Final
Manitoba (Calvert) 🔨	1	1	0	1	0	2	0	1	0	2	8
Saskatchewan (Hersikorn)	0	0	1	0	1	0	2	0	2	0	6

== Women ==
=== Round Robin Standings ===
Final Round Robin Standings

Key
Teams to Championship Pool

Pool A	Skip	W	L
Alberta	Kelsey Rocque	6	0
Ontario	Chelsea Brandwood	5	1
Quebec	Émilia Gagné	4	2
Manitoba	Beth Peterson	3	3
Northern Ontario	Krysta Burns	2	4
Yukon	Bailey Horte	1	5
Nunavut	Sadie Pinksen	0	6

Pool B	Skip	W	L
British Columbia	Corryn Brown	6	0
Nova Scotia	Mary Fay	4	2
Saskatchewan	Kristen Streifel	4	2
New Brunswick	Justine Comeau	3	3
Prince Edward Island	Veronica Smith	2	4
Newfoundland and Labrador	Sarah Hill	1	5
Northwest Territories	Carina McKay-Saturnino	1	5

=== Championship Pool Standings ===
Final Round Robin Standings

Key
Teams to Playoffs

Province	Skip	W	L
Alberta	Kelsey Rocque	9	1
Ontario	Chelsea Brandwood	7	3
British Columbia	Corryn Brown	7	3
New Brunswick	Justine Comeau	6	4
Manitoba	Beth Peterson	6	4
Nova Scotia	Mary Fay	6	4
Saskatchewan	Kristen Streifel	6	4
Quebec	Émilia Gagné	4	6

=== Playoffs ===
Semifinal			Final
			1	Alberta	8
2	Ontario	9	2	Ontario	2
3	British Columbia	4

==== Semifinal ====
Saturday, January 31, 1:30 pm

Team	1	2	3	4	5	6	7	8	9	10	Final
Ontario (Brandwood) 🔨	0	1	0	1	0	1	0	3	3	X	9
British Columbia (Brown)	0	0	1	0	2	0	1	0	0	X	4

==== Final ====
Saturday, January 31, 8:00 pm

Team	1	2	3	4	5	6	7	8	9	10	Final
Alberta (Rocque) 🔨	0	1	0	2	0	1	0	2	2	X	8
Ontario (Brandwood)	0	0	1	0	0	0	1	0	0	X	2

== Qualification ==
=== Newfoundland and Labrador ===
The Junior Provincials were held December 28–29 at the Re/Max CC in St. John's (women's) and January 3–6 at the Caribou Curling Club in Stephenville (men's). Junior Women's will be a best 3 of 5 series between the two teams qualified; Junior Men's will be a single round robin. For the playoffs, the Junior Men's division will have the top three teams advancing to the playoffs. If a team goes undefeated in the round robin, they must be beaten twice in the playoffs.

Results:

Men's	W	L
Greg Smith (Caribou)	5	0
Stephen Trickett (Re/Max)	4	1
Andrew Taylor (Re/Max)	3	2
Greg Blyde (Re/Max)	2	3
Daniel Bruce (Corner Brook)	1	4
James Bryson (Bally Haly)	0	5

- Men's semi final: Trickett 8 - Taylor 9
- Men's final: Smith 7 - Taylor 3

Women (Best 3-of-5): Sarah Hill (Re/Max) vs Megan Kearley (Re/Max)

- Game 1: Hill 8 - Kearley 2
- Game 2: Hill 8 - Kearley 2
- Game 3: Hill 7 - Kearley 8
- Game 4: Hill 8 - Kearley 3

=== Nova Scotia ===
The Mackie's NS Junior Provincials were held December 27–31 at the Lakeshore Curling Club in Sackville. The event is a modified triple knock-out qualifying three teams in a modified playoff.

Pre-Playoff Results:

Men's	W	L
Matthew Manuel (Mayflower)	7	0
Graeme Weagle (Chester)	4	3
Jonathan Crouse (Halifax)	3	3
Drew Spinney (Truro)	3	3
Adam Cocks (Chester)	2	3
Aaron Raymond (Chester)	2	3
Liam Moore (CFB Halifax)	0	3
Alex Campbell (Northumberland)	0	3

Women's	W	L
Mary Fay (Chester)	6	1
Hayley McCabe (Lakeshore)	4	2
Micayla Dorey (Wolfville)	4	3
Kristin Clarke (Mayflower)	3	3
Ashley Francis (Highlander)	2	3
Mandi Newhook (Truro)	1	3
Brooke Godsland (Berwick)	1	3
Emily Ball (Lakeshore)	0	3

Playoff Results:

- Men's semi final (N/A): Manuel vs Manuel
- Men's final (N/A): Manuel vs Manuel
- Women's semi final: McCabe 5 - Fay 6
- Women's final (N/A): Fay vs Fay

=== Prince Edward Island ===
The Pepsi PEI Provincial Junior Curling Championships were held December 27–31 at the Charlottetown Curling Club in Charlottetown.

The juniors will play a modified triple-knockout format, which will qualify three teams for a championship round.

Pre-Playoff Results:

Men's	W	L
Tyler Smith (Montague/Crapaud)	5	1
Matthew MacLean (Maple Leaf)	2	2
Alex MacFadyen (Silver Fox)	5	3
Donald DeWolfe (Cornwall)	2	3
Leslie Noye (Western)	1	3
Devin Schut (Cornwall)	0	3

Women's	W	L
Veronica Smith (Cornwall)	5	0
Jane DiCarlo (Charlottetown)	4	3
Jenny McLean (Silver Fox)	3	3
Lauren Moerike (Charlottetown)	2	3
Lauren Lenentine (Cornwall)	1	3
Kaleigh MacKay (Crapaud)	0	3

Playoff Results:

- Men's semi final: T. Smith 11 - MacLean 3
- Men's final (N/A): T. Smith vs T. Smith
- Women's semi final (N/A): V. Smith vs V. Smith
- Women's final (N/A): V. Smith vs V. Smith

=== New Brunswick ===
The O'Leary Junior Provincial Championships are being held January 2–5 at the Beausejour Curling Club and Moncton Curling Association in Moncton. The event is a modified triple knockout, qualifying three teams in a modified playoff.

Results:

Men's	W	L
Rene Comeau (Fredericton)	5	2
Daniel Prest (Fredericton)	4	2
Peter Robichaud (Moncton)	3	2
Alex Robichaud (Fredericton)	4	3
Liam Marin (Thistle)	3	3
Matt Nason (Thistle)	2	3
Matt Stanley (Moncton)	0	3
Kyle Hughes (Fredericton)	0	3

Women's	W	L
Justine Comeau (Fredericton)	7	2
Cathlia Ward (Fredericton)	5	2
Samantha Crook (Gage)	3	3
Danielle Hubbard (Moncton)	2	3
Katelyn Kelly (Fredericton)	2	3
Molli Ward (Sackville)	1	3
Grace Standen (Moncton)	0	3

- Men's semi final: P. Robichaud 5 - Prest 7
- Men's final: R. Comeau 5 - Prest 3
- Women's semi final: Ward 4 - J. Comeau 5
- Women's final: Ward 6 - J. Comeau 10

=== Quebec ===
The Championnat Provincial Junior Brosse Performance are being held from January 4–8 at the Club de curling Etchemin in Lévis, Quebec.

The event is a round-robin with a modified playoff.

Men's	W	L
Félix Asselin (Trois-Rivières)	6	1
Spencer Richmond (Lennox)	5	2
Nickolas Côté (Laval)	5	2
Louis Quevillon (Lacolle)	4	3
Julien Tremblay (Rimouski)	3	4
Vincent Roberge (Etchemin)	3	4
Thomas Lo (TMR)	1	6
Antoine Provencher (Laval)	1	6

Women's	W	L
Geneviève Laurier (Etchemin)	5	2
Émilia Gagné (Riverbend)	5	2
Taylor Mackay (St-Lambert)	4	3
Dominique Jean (Montréal-Ouest)	4	3
Laurie St-Georges (Laval)	4	3
Laura Guénard (Kénogami)	3	4
Maude Fleurant (Laurier)	2	5
Gabrielle Lavoie (Victoriaville)	1	6

- Men's semi final: Côté 5 - Richmond 7
- Men's final: Asselin 6 - Richmond 3
- Women's Tiebreaker 1: Mackay 6 - St-Georges 5
- Women's Tiebreaker 2: Jean 3 - Mackay 5
- Women's semi final: Gagné 11 - Mackay 2
- Women's final: Laurier 3 - Gagné 5

=== Ontario ===
The Pepsi Ontario Junior Curling Championships are being held January 7–11 at the Galt Curling Club in Cambridge, Ontario.

Results:

Men's	W	L
Mac Calwell (Quinte)	6	1
Pascal Michaud (Annandale)	6	1
Doug Kee (Rideau)	5	2
Matt Hall (Stroud)	3	4
Graham Singer (Collingwood)	3	4
James Harris (Bayview)	3	4
Charle Richard (Woodstock)	2	5
Tyler Twining (Paris)	0	7

Women's	W	L
Molly Greenwood (K-W)	6	1
Chelsea Brandwood (Glendale)	6	1
Lauren Horton (Almonte)	4	3
Melissa Wong (RCMP)	3	4
Kaitlin Jewer (Annandale)	3	4
Kristina Adams (Ennismore)	2	5
Samantha Morris (St. Catharines)	2	5
Courtney Auld (Shelburne)	2	5

- Men's semi final: Michaud 7 - Kee 3
- Men's final: Calwell 9 - Michaud 1
- Women's semi final: Brandwood 6 - Horton 3
- Women's final: Greenwood 4 - Brandwood 11

=== Northern Ontario ===
The Junior Provincial Championships are being held January 3–6 at the Soo Curlers Association in Sault Ste Marie.

Results:

Men's	W	L
Zach Warkentin (Port Arthur)	7	0
Tanner Horgan (Idylwylde)	6	1
Brendan Acorn (Sudbury)	5	2
Chris Glibota (Soo Curlers)	4	3
Christopher Silver (Fort Frances)	3	4
Sam Cull (Sudbury)	2	5
Max Cull (Sudbury)	1	6
Jaron Hoppe (Keewatin)	0	7

Women's	W	L
Megan Smith (Sudbury)	7	0
Calli Barclay (North Bay Granite)	5	2
Krysta Burns (Idylwylde)	5	2
Katie Rutledge (Soo Curlers)	4	3
Jenna Poirier (Sioux Lookout)	3	4
Sydnie Stinson (Copper Cliff)	2	5
Jamie Smith (Coniston)	1	6
Katelyn Dumoulin (Cochrane)	1	6

- Men's semi final: Horgan 9 - Acorn 7
- Men's final: Warkentin 6 - Horgan 9
- Women's semi final: Barclay 6 - Burns 11
- Women's final: Smith 3 - Burns 6

=== Manitoba ===
The Canola Junior Provincial Championships are being held December 26–31 at the Assiniboine Memorial Curling Club in Winnipeg

Results:

Men's	W	L
Asham Black Group
Braden Calvert (Deer Lodge)	7	0
Hayden Forrester (Heather)	6	1
Devon Wiebe (Portage)	4	3
Jordan Smith (Granite)	4	3
Austin Mustard (Carberry)	3	4
Sean Davidson (Portage)	3	4
Chad Sahulka (Winnipegosis)	1	6
Erik Rafnson (East St Paul)	0	7
Red Brick Red Group
Matt Dunstone (Granite)	6	1
Cole Peters (Granite)	6	1
Colin Kurz (Granite)	5	2
JT Ryan (Assiniboine)	5	2
Carter Watkins (Swan River)	3	4
Nathaniel Swanson (Heather)	2	5
Quinn Robins (Rivers)	1	6
Braden Magura (Springfield)	0	7

Women's	W	L
Asham Black Group
Shannon Birchard (St Vital)	7	0
Rachel Burtnyk (Assiniboine)	6	1
Jennifer Klapp (Fort Rouge)	5	2
Christine MacKay (Fort Rouge)	4	3
Ashley Groff (Elmwood)	3	4
Kaitlyn Payette (Brandon)	2	5
Hanne Jensen (Dauphin)	1	6
Stacy Sime (Dauphin)	0	7
Red Brick Red Group
Beth Peterson (Fort Rouge)	6	1
Lisa Reid (St Vital)	4	3
Brooke Friesen (Winkler)	4	3
Sara Oliver (West Kildonan)	4	3
Kristy Watling (East St. Paul)	4	3
Jennifer Curle (West Kildonan)	3	4
Randine Baker (Petersfield)	3	4
Emma Jensen (Dauphin)	0	7

- Men's B1 vs R1: Calvert 6 - Dunstone 7
- Men's B2 vs R2: Forrester 5 - Peters 7
- Men's semi final: Calvert 10 - Peters 5
- Men's final: Dunstone 6 - Calvert 7
- Women's Tiebreaker 1: Friesen 7 - Oliver 5
- Women's Tiebreaker 2: Watling 3 - Reid 7
- Women's Tiebreaker 3: Reid 10 - Friesen 4
- Women's B1 vs R1: Birchard 9 - Peterson 3
- Women's B2 vs R2: Burtnyk 6 - Reid 8
- Women's semi final: Peterson 7 - Reid 6
- Women's final: Birchard 5 - Peterson 6

=== Saskatchewan ===
The Junior Provincial Championships are being held January 1–5 at the Humboldt Curling Club in Humboldt.

Men's	W	L
Pool A
Jacob Hersikorn (Sutherland)	5	0
Kyle Cherpin (Nutana)	3	2
Garret Springer (Callie)	3	2
Judd Dlouhy (Assiniboia)	3	2
Sam Wills (Tartan)	1	4
Kevin Haines (Callie)	0	5
Pool B
Rylan Kleiter (Sutherland)	3	2
Chad Lang (Nutana)	3	2
Jeremy ven der Buhs (Sutherland)	3	2
Travis Tokarz (CN)	3	2
Dallas Burnett (Granite)	2	3
Shawn Vereschagin (Sutherland)	1	4

Women's	W	L
Pool A
Kristen Streifel (Nutana)	4	1
Chaelynn Kitz (Estevan)	4	1
Nicole Thompson (Callie)	3	2
Jade Kerr (Callie)	2	3
Hanna Anderson (Hanley)	1	4
Kaitlin Corbin (Moose Ford)	1	4
Pool B
Kaitlyn Jones (Tartan)	3	2
Jessica Mitchell (Granite)	3	2
Brooke Tokarz (Granite)	3	2
Jenna Golanowski (Granite)	2	3
Christina Hlatky (Highland)	2	3
Megan Lamontagne (Lumsden)	2	3

- Men's Tiebreaker 1: Cherpin 9 - Dlouhy 7
- Men's Tiebreaker 2: Lang 9 - T. Tokarz 6
- Men's Tiebreaker 3: ven der Buhs 2 - Lang 8
- Men's Tiebreaker 4: Springer 3 - Cherpin 9
- Men's A1 vs. B1: Hersikorn 6 - Kleiter 5
- Men's A2 vs. B2: Lang 9 - Cherpin 2
- Men's semi final: Kleiter 10 - Lang 4
- Men's final: Hersikorn 10 - Kleiter 3
- Women's Tiebreaker: Mitchell 5 - B. Tokarz 4
- Women's A1 vs. B1: Streifel 8 - Jones 6
- Women's A2 vs. B2: Kitz 6 - Mitchell 9
- Women's semi final: Jones 2 - Mitchell 8
- Women's final: Streifel 9 - Mitchell 5

=== Alberta ===
The Subway Junior Provincials are being held January 7–11 at the Grande Prairie Curling Club in Grande Prairie.

Results:

Men's	W	L
Karsten Sturmay (Avonair)	6	1
Jeremy Harty (Glencoe/Calgary)	5	2
Thomas Scoffin (Saville)	5	2
Tyler Lautner (Calgary)	4	3
Kyler Kleibrink (Calgary)	4	3
Corey Leach (Lac La Biche)	3	4
Dustin Turcotte (Fahler)	1	6
Lane Knievel (Manning)	0	7

Women's	W	L
Kelsey Rocque (Saville)	6	1
Janais DeJong (Grande Prairie)	5	2
Selena Sturmay (Airdrie)	5	2
Chantele Broderson (Saville)	4	3
Mckenna Jones (Strathmore)	4	3
Kellie Henricks (Ellerslie)	2	5
Kelsey Dixon (North Hill)	1	6
Kayla Skrlik (Fahler)	1	6

- Men's semi final: Harty 8 - Scoffin 7
- Men's final: Sturmay 7 - Harty 4
- Women's semi final: DeJong 7 - Sturmay 4
- Women's final: Rocque 6 - DeJong 5

=== British Columbia ===
The Tim Horton's Junior Provincial Championships were held December 28–January 3 at the Parksville Curling Club in Parksville.

Results:

Men's	W	L
Cody Tanaka (Abbotsford)	6	1
Paul Henderson (Victoria)	5	2
Thomas Love (Vernon)	5	2
Connor Croteau (Juan de Fuca)	4	3
Brayden Carpenter (Royal City)	4	3
Zane Bartlett (Grand Forks)	3	4
Jonathan Loeppky (Prince Rupert)	1	6
Matt Schiman (Vernon)	0	7

Women's	W	L
Sarah Daniels (Nanaimo/Delta)	7	0
Corryn Brown (Kamloops)	6	1
Mariah Coulombe (Victoria)	5	2
Shawna Jensen (Powell River/Delta)	4	3
Cierra Fisher (Vernon)	3	4
Alyssa Connell (Prince George)	1	6
Briana Egan (Coquitlam)	1	6
Kirsten Zucchet (Chilliwack)	1	6

- Men's semi final: Henderson 11 - Love 7
- Men's final: Tanaka 8 - Henderson 9
- Women's semi final: Brown 7 - Coulombe 2
- Women's final: Daniels 2 - Brown 8

=== Yukon ===
Hosted Dec. 20-21 at the Whitehorse CC in Whitehorse

- Men's Winners: Joe Wallingham
- Women's Winners: Bailey Horte defeated Alyssa Meger

=== Northwest Territories ===
Hosted Dec. 28-30 at the Fort Smith CC in Fort Smith.

Results:

- Men's winner: Matthew Miller (Inuvik)

Women's	W	L
Carina McKay-Saturnino (Inuvik)	6	0
Elizabeth Sperry (Hay River)	4	2
Zoey Walsh (Hay River)	1	5
Anne Thomas (Yellowknife)	1	5

=== Nunavut ===
- Women: Sadie Pinksen (Iqaluit CC)
- Men: Kane Komaksiutiksak (Qavik CC)
