= 2012 Challenge Chateau Cartier de Gatineau =

- Host city: Gatineau, Quebec; Buckingham, Quebec
- Arena: Centre Sportif Robert-Rochon; Buckingham Curling Club
- Dates: October 25–28
- Men's winner: (Nova Scotia) Mark Dacey
- Skip: Mark Dacey
- Third: Tom Sullivan
- Second: Steve Burgess
- Lead: Andrew Gibson
- Finalist: (Newfoundland and Labrador) Brad Gushue
- Women's winner: (Ontario) Julie Reddick
- Skip: Julie Reddick
- Third: Carrie Lindner
- Second: Megan Balsdon
- Lead: Laura Hickey
- Finalist: (Ontario) Cathy Auld

The 2012 Challenge Chateau Cartier de Gatineau was held from October 25 to 28 at the Centre Sportif Robert-Rochon in Gatineau and at the Buckingham Curling Club in Buckingham, Quebec as part of the 2012–13 World Curling Tour. The men's event was held in a triple knockout format, while the women's event was held in a round-robin format. The purse for the men's event was CAD$40,000, of which the winner, Mark Dacey, received CAD$10,000. The purse for the women's event was CAD$11,500, of which the winner, Julie Reddick, received CAD$3,500.

In the men's final, Mark Dacey defeated Brad Gushue with a score of 7–6, while in the women's final, Julie Reddick defeated Cathy Auld with a score of 8–4.

== Men ==
=== Teams ===
The teams are listed as follows:

Skip	Third	Second	Lead	Locale
Bowie Abbis-Mills	Craig Van Ymeren	Ed Cyr	Geoff Chambers	Aylmer, Ontario
Greg Balsdon	Mark Bice	Tyler Morgan	Jamie Farnell	Toronto, Ontario
Don Bowser	Jonathan Beuk	Matt Broder	TJ Connolly	Ottawa, Ontario
Craig Brown	Kroy Nernberger	Matt Hamilton	Derrick Casper	Madison, Wisconsin
Jordan Chandler	Kyle Chandler	Derek D'Agostino	Gavan Jamieson	Ontario
Chris Gardner (fourth)	Mathew Camm	Brad Kidd	Bryan Cochrane (skip)	Ottawa, Ontario
Spencer Cooper	Willie Jeffries	Brian Vance	Steve Forrest	Ontario
Mark Dacey	Tom Sullivan	Steve Burgess	Andrew Gibson	Halifax, Nova Scotia
Robert Desjardins	Jean-Sebastien Roy	Steven Munroe	Steeve Villeneuve	Chicoutimi, Quebec
John Epping	Scott Bailey	Scott Howard	David Mathers	Toronto, Ontario
Martin Ferland	François Roberge	Shawn Fowler	Maxime Elmaleh	Quebec City, Quebec
Michael Fournier	Francois Gionest	Yannick Martel	Jean-François Charest	Montreal, Quebec
Brad Gushue	Adam Casey	Brett Gallant	Geoff Walker	St. John's, Newfoundland and Labrador
Guy Hemmings	François Gagné	Ghyslain Richard	Christian Bouchard	Montreal, Quebec
Brent Ross (fourth)	Jake Higgs (skip)	Codey Maus	Bill Buchanan	Harriston, Ontario
Mark Homan	Mike McLean	Brian Fleischhaker	Nathan Crawford	Ottawa, Ontario
Brad Jacobs	Ryan Fry	E. J. Harnden	Ryan Harnden	Sault Ste. Marie, Ontario
Matt Seabrook (fourth)	Mike Jakubo (skip)	Sandy MacEwan	Lee Toner	Sudbury, Ontario
Mark Kean	Travis Fanset	Patrick Janssen	Tim March	Toronto, Ontario
Mark Kehoe	Glen MacLeod	Ryan Garven	Richard Barker	Halifax, Nova Scotia
Shane Latimer	Ritchie Gillan	Terry Scharf	Kevin Rathwell	Ottawa, Ontario
Simon Lejour	Yannick Lejour	Mathieu Lambert	Claude Chapdeelaine	Lacolle, Quebec
Philippe Lemay	Mathieu Beaufort	Jean-Michel Arsenault	Erik Lachance	Trois-Rivières, Quebec
Ian MacAulay	Steve Allen	Rick Allen	Barry Conrad	Ottawa, Ontario
Eddie MacKenzie	Anson Carmody	Christian Tolusso	Alex MacFayden	Charlottetown, Prince Edward Island
Jean-Michel Ménard	Martin Crête	Éric Sylvain	Philippe Ménard	Quebec City, Quebec
Jamie Murphy	Jordan Pinder	Mike Bardsley	Don McDermaid	Halifax, Nova Scotia
Howard Rajala	J. P. Lachance	Chris Fulton	Paul Madden	Ottawa, Ontario
Wayne Tuck, Jr.	Chad Allen	Jay Allen	Caleb Flaxey	Toronto, Ontario

=== Knockout results ===
The draw is listed as follows:

==== A event ====
First Knockout
(Nova Scotia) Mark Dacey	6
(Quebec) Pierre Charette	1
(Quebec) Roberd Desjardins	4
(Ontario) Howard Rajala	5
(Ontario) Shane Latimer
(Ontario) Jake Higgs
(Quebec) Jean-Michel Ménard	4
(Ontario) Spencer Cooper	1
(Ontario) Mike Jakubo	3
(Wisconsin) Craig Brown	8
(Nova Scotia) Jamie Murphy	5
(Ontario) Ian MacAulay	3
(Ontario) Mark Homan	4
(Ontario) Mark Kean	7

Quarterfinals
(Ontario) John Epping	4
(Nova Scotia) Mark Dacey	7
(Ontario) Howard Rajala	7
(Ontario) Shane Latimer	2
(Quebec) Jean-Michel Ménard	6
(Wisconsin) Craig Brown	5
(Nova Scotia) Jamie Murphy	6
(Ontario) Mark Kean	3

Semifinals
(Nova Scotia) Mark Dacey	7
(Ontario) Howard Rajala	4
(Quebec) Jean-Michel Ménard	6
(Nova Scotia) Jamie Murphy	8

Qualifier 1
(Nova Scotia) Mark Dacey	6
(Nova Scotia) Jamie Murphy	1

First Knockout
(Ontario) Greg Balsdon	7
(Quebec) Simon Lejour	2
(Quebec) Michael Fournier	0
(Quebec) Martin Ferland	5
(Quebec) Guy Hemmings	6
(Quebec) Philippe Lemay	5
(Ontario) Bryan Cochrane	5
(Ontario) Jordan Chandler	3
(Ontario) Bowie Abbis-Mills	4
(Prince Edward Island) Eddie MacKenzie	6
(Ontario) Wayne Tuck, Jr.	5
(Ontario) Don Bowser	4
(Nova Scotia) Mark Kehoe	5
(Newfoundland and Labrador) Brad Gushue	8

Quarterfinals
(Ontario) Greg Balsdon	8
(Quebec) Martin Ferland	5
(Ontario) Brad Jacobs	8
(Quebec) Guy Hemmings	0
(Ontario) Bryan Cochrane	9
(Prince Edward Island) Eddie MacKenzie	5
(Ontario) Wayne Tuck, Jr.	2
(Newfoundland and Labrador) Brad Gushue	9

Semifinals
(Ontario) Greg Balsdon	4
(Ontario) Brad Jacobs	3
(Ontario) Bryan Cochrane	4
(Newfoundland and Labrador) Brad Gushue	10

Qualifier 2
(Ontario) Greg Balsdon	2
(Newfoundland and Labrador) Brad Gushue	5

==== B event ====
Second Knockout
(Ontario) Jake Higgs	2
(Quebec) Robert Desjardins	3

Quarterfinals
(Wisconsin) Craig Brown	7
(Quebec) Pierre Charette	3
(Ontario) Mark Kean	7
(Quebec) Robert Desjardins	5

Semifinals
(Wisconsin) Craig Brown	6
(Ontario) Bryan Cochrane	7
(Ontario) Mark Kean	2
(Ontario) Brad Jacobs	5

To Qualifier 3
(Ontario) Bryan Cochrane	5
(Ontario) Brad Jacobs	1
Qualifier 3
(Ontario) Bryan Cochrane	2
(Ontario) Ian MacAulay	5

Second Knockout
(Ontario) Spencer Cooper	4
(Ontario) Mike Jakubo	6
(Ontario) Ian MacAulay	8
(Ontario) Mark Homan	6

Quarterfinals
(Ontario) John Epping	5
(Ontario) Mike Jakubo	8
(Ontario) Shane Latimer	2
(Ontario) Ian MacAulay	4

Semifinals
(Ontario) Mike Jakubo	4
(Ontario) Ian MacAulay	5

To Qualifier 3
(Ontario) Ian MacAulay	7
(Nova Scotia) Jamie Murphy	2

Second Knockout
(Quebec) Simon Lejour	3
(Quebec) Michael Fournier	8

Quarterfinals
(Prince Edward Island) Eddie MacKenzie	6
(Quebec) Michael Fournier	8
(Ontario) Wayne Tuck, Jr.	8
(Quebec) Philippe Lemay	4

Semifinals
(Quebec) Michael Fournier	7
(Ontario) Howard Rajala	5
(Ontario) Wayne Tuck, Jr.	1
(Quebec) Jean-Michel Ménard	6

To Qualifier 4
(Quebec) Michael Fournier	8
(Quebec) Jean-Michel Ménard	3
Qualifier 4
(Quebec) Michael Fournier	2
(Ontario) Greg Balsdon	6

Second Knockout
(Ontario) Jordan Chandler	5
(Ontario) Bowie Abbis-Mills	6
(Ontario) Don Bowser	3
(Nova Scotia) Mark Kehoe	4

Quarterfinals
(Quebec) Martin Ferland	6
(Ontario) Bowie Abbis-Mills	3
(Quebec) Guy Hemmings	6
(Nova Scotia) Mark Kehoe	1

Semifinals
(Quebec) Martin Ferland	4
(Quebec) Guy Hemmings	9

To Qualifier 4
(Quebec) Guy Hemmings	0
(Ontario) Greg Balsdon	4

==== C event ====
Third Knockout
(Quebec) Pierre Charette	7
(Ontario) Jake Higgs	2

Quarterfinals
(Ontario) Howard Rajala	3
(Quebec) Martin Ferland	5
(Ontario) Wayne Tuck, Jr.	7
(Quebec) Pierre Charette	5

Semifinals
(Quebec) Martin Ferland	9
(Ontario) Wayne Tuck, Jr.	5

Qualifier 5
(Quebec) Martin Ferland	5
(Ontario) Bryan Cochrane	1

Third Knockout
(Ontario) Spencer Cooper	6
(Ontario) Mark Homan	8

Quarterfinals
(Ontario) Bowie Abbis-Mills	5
(Nova Scotia) Mark Kehoe	6
(Quebec) Robert Desjardins	7
(Ontario) Mark Homan	6

Semifinals
(Nova Scotia) Mark Kehoe	5
(Quebec) Jean-Michel Ménard	6
(Quebec) Robert Desjardins	4
(Nova Scotia) Jamie Murphy	6

Qualifier 6
(Quebec) Jean-Michel Ménard	7
(Nova Scotia) Jamie Murphy	2

Third Knockout
(Quebec) Simon Lejour	4
(Quebec) Philippe Lemay	6

Quarterfinals
(Prince Edward Island) Eddie MacKenzie	4
(Quebec) Philippe Lemay	2
(Ontario) John Epping	3
(Ontario) Shane Latimer	5

Semifinals
(Prince Edward Island) Eddie MacKenzie	0
(Ontario) Brad Jacobs	6
(Ontario) Shane Latimer	1
(Quebec) Guy Hemmings	7

Qualifier 7
(Ontario) Brad Jacobs	5
(Quebec) Guy Hemmings	4

Third Knockout
(Ontario) Jordan Chandler	4
(Ontario) Don Bowser	7

Quarterfinals
(Wisconsin) Craig Brown	6
(Ontario) Don Bowser	2
(Ontario) Mark Kean	8
(Ontario) Mike Jakubo	1

Semifinals
(Wisconsin) Craig Brown	1
(Ontario) Mark Kean	5

Qualifier 8
(Ontario) Mark Kean	5
(Quebec) Michael Fournier	1

=== Playoffs ===
The playoffs draw is listed as follows:

Quarterfinals
(Nova Scotia) Mark Dacey	8
(Ontario) Mark Kean	7
(Ontario) Greg Balsdon	5
(Quebec) Martin Ferland	3
(Newfoundland and Labrador) Brad Gushue	6
(Ontario) Brad Jacobs	5
(Ontario) Ian MacAulay	6
(Quebec) Jean-Michel Ménard	2

Semifinals
(Nova Scotia) Mark Dacey	5
(Ontario) Greg Balsdon	4
(Newfoundland and Labrador) Brad Gushue	7
(Ontario) Ian MacAulay	1

Final
(Nova Scotia) Mark Dacey	7
(Newfoundland and Labrador) Brad Gushue	6

== Women ==
=== Teams ===
The teams are listed as follows:

Skip	Third	Second	Lead	Locale
Cathy Auld	Janet Murphy	Stephanie Gray	Melissa Foster	Mississauga, Ontario
Ginger Coyle	Lauren Wood	Laura Brown	Robyn Murphy	Dundas, Ontario
Lisa Farnell	Erin Morrissey	Karen Sagle	Ainsley Galbraith	Elgin, Ontario
Julie Hamel				Quebec
Kelly MacIntosh	Jennifer Crouse	Sheena Gilman	Shelley Barker	Dartmouth, Nova Scotia
Ekaterina Antonova (fourth)	Victorya Moiseeva (skip)	Galina Arsenkina	Aleksandra Saitova	Moscow, Russia
Katie Morrissey	Kiri Campbell	Lorelle Weiss	Cassandra de Groot	Ottawa, Ontario
Jill Mouzar	Stephanie LeDrew	Danielle Inglis	Hollie Nicol	Toronto, Ontario
Allison Nimik	Katie Pringle	Lynn Kreviazuk	Morgan Court	Toronto, Ontario
Laura Payne	Alexis Riordan	Lynsey Longfield	Ailsa Leitch	Ottawa, Ontario
Julie Reddick	Carrie Lindner	Megan Balsdon	Laura Hickey	Toronto, Ontario
Allison Ross	Audree Dufresne	Brittany O'Rourke	Sasha Beauchamp	Montreal, Quebec

=== Round-robin standings ===
Final round-robin standings

Key
Teams to Playoffs

Pool A	W	L
(Quebec) Allison Ross	3	0
(Ontario) Cathy Auld	2	1
(Ontario) Jill Mouzar	1	2
(Ontario) Ginger Coyle	0	3

Pool B	W	L
(Ontario) Allison Nimik	2	1
(Ontario) Lisa Farnell	2	1
(Quebec) Julie Hamel	1	2
(Nova Scotia) Kelly MacIntosh	1	2

Pool C	W	L
(Ontario) Laura Payne	2	1
(Ontario) Julie Reddick	2	1
(Russia) Victorya Moiseeva	1	2
(Ontario) Katie Morrissey	1	2

=== Playoffs ===
The playoffs draw is listed as follows:

Quarterfinals		Semifinals		Final
		(Quebec) Allison Ross	5
(Ontario) Allison Nimik	2	(Ontario) Cathy Auld	6
(Ontario) Cathy Auld	6			(Ontario) Cathy Auld	4
(Ontario) Julie Reddick	8			(Ontario) Julie Reddick	8
(Ontario) Laura Payne	3	(Ontario) Lisa Farnell	4
		(Ontario) Julie Reddick	5
