= 2012 AMJ Campbell Shorty Jenkins Classic =

- Host city: Brockville, Ontario
- Arena: Brockville Country Club
- Dates: September 13–16
- Men's winner: (Ontario) John Epping
- Curling club: Donalda CC, Toronto
- Skip: John Epping
- Third: Scott Bailey
- Second: Scott Howard
- Lead: David Mathers
- Finalist: (Manitoba) Jeff Stoughton
- Women's winner: (Ontario) Tracy Horgan
- Curling club: Idylwylde G&CC, Sudbury
- Skip: Tracy Horgan
- Third: Jenn Seabrook
- Second: Jenna Enge
- Lead: Amanda Gates
- Finalist: (Scotland) Eve Muirhead

The 2012 AMJ Campbell Shorty Jenkins Classic is an annual curling bonspiel that was held from September 13 to 16 at the Brockville Country Club in Brockville, Ontario as part of the 2012–13 World Curling Tour. The winning team of John Epping took home the purse for the men's of CAD$40,700 and Tracy Horgan took home CAD$16,400, after winning the women's event.

== Men ==
=== Teams ===
Skip	Third	Second	Lead	Locale
Pierre Charette	Richard Faguy	Louis Biron	Maurice Cayouette	Buckingham, Quebec
Chris Gardner (fourth)	Mathew Camm	Brad Kidd	Bryan Cochrane (skip)	Ottawa, Ontario
Dave Collyer	Evan Sullivan	Bill Leitch	Peter Aker	Belleville, Ontario
Denis Cordick	John Morris	Kevin Stringer	Richard Garden	Toronto, Ontario
Robert Desjardins	Jean-Sébastien Roy	Steven Munroe	Steeve Villeneuve	Chicoutimi, Quebec
John Epping	Scott Bailey	Scott Howard	David Mathers	Toronto, Ontario
Pete Fenson	Shawn Rojeski	Joe Polo	Ryan Brunt	Bemidji, Minnesota
Martin Ferland	François Roberge	Shawn Fowler	Maxime Elmaleh	Quebec City, Quebec
Dwayne Fowler	Steve Lodge	Dan Cook	Ian Bridger	Prescott, Ontario
Joe Frans	Ryan Werenich	Jeff Gorda	Shawn Kaufman	Bradford, Ontario
Brad Gushue	Adam Casey	Brett Gallant	Geoff Walker	St. John's, Newfoundland and Labrador
Guy Hemmings	François Gagné	Ghyslain Richard	Christian Bouchard	Mount Royal, Quebec
Brad Jacobs	Ryan Fry	E. J. Harnden	Ryan Harnden	Sault Ste. Marie, Ontario
Mark Kean	Travis Fanset	Patrick Janssen	Tim March	Toronto, Ontario
Kevin Koe	Pat Simmons	Carter Rycroft	Nolan Thiessen	Edmonton, Alberta
Philippe Lemay	Mathieu Beaufort	Jean-Michel Arsenault	Erik Lachance	Trois-Rivières, Quebec
Brian Lewis	Jeff McCrady	Steve Doty	Graham Sinclair	Ottawa, Ontario
Liu Rui	Xu Xiaoming	Zang Jialiang	Ba Dexin	Harbin, China
Heath McCormick	Matt Hames	Bill Stopera	Dean Gemmell	(New York (state)) New York City, New York
Jean-Michel Ménard	Martin Crête	Éric Sylvain	Philippe Ménard	Quebec City, Quebec
Sven Michel	Claudio Pätz	Sandro Trolliet	Simon Gempeler	Adelboden, Switzerland
Matt Paul	TBA	Andrew Hamilton	Ed Cyr	Ottawa, Ontario
Jeff Stoughton	Jon Mead	Reid Carruthers	Mark Nichols	Winnipeg, Manitoba
Wayne Tuck, Jr.	Chad Allen	Jay Allen	Caleb Flaxey	Toronto, Ontario

=== Round Robin Standings ===
Pool A	W	L
(Alberta) Kevin Koe	5	0
(Ontario) Mark Kean	3	2
(China) Liu Rui	3	2
(Quebec) Philippe Lemay	2	3
(Ontario) Dave Collyer	1	4
(Ontario) Wayne Tuck, Jr.	1	4

Pool B	W	L
(Ontario) John Epping	4	1
(Minnesota) Pete Fenson	4	1
(Quebec) Jean-Michel Ménard	3	2
(Quebec) Robert Desjardins	2	3
(Ontario) Matt Paul	1	4
(Quebec) Guy Hemmings	1	4

Pool C	W	L
(Manitoba) Jeff Stoughton	4	1
(Quebec) Pierre Charette	3	2
(Quebec) Martin Ferland	3	2
(Ontario) Bryan Cochrane	3	2
(Switzerland) Sven Michel	2	3
(Ontario) Denis Cordick	0	5

Pool D	W	L
(Ontario) Brad Jacobs	4	1
(Newfoundland and Labrador) Brad Gushue	3	2
(Ontario) Joe Frans	3	2
(New York (state)) Heath McCormick	2	3
(Ontario) Brian Lewis	2	3
(Ontario) Dwayne Fowler	1	4

=== Results ===
All times local (Eastern Time Zone)

==== Draw 1 ====
September 13, 4:00 PM

Sheet 2	1	2	3	4	5	6	7	8	Final
(Switzerland) Sven Michel	1	0	0	0	2	0	X	X	3
(Quebec) Pierre Charette	0	0	3	1	0	3	X	X	7

Sheet 3	1	2	3	4	5	6	7	8	Final
(Ontario) Brian Cochrane	0	3	0	3	2	X	X	X	8
(Ontario) Denis Cordick	1	0	1	0	0	X	X	X	2

Sheet 4	1	2	3	4	5	6	7	8	9	Final
(Ontario) Dwayne Fowler	0	0	2	3	2	0	0	0	0	7
(Ontario) Joe Frans	0	2	0	0	0	3	1	1	1	8

==== Draw 2 ====
September 13, 6:30 PM

Sheet 1	1	2	3	4	5	6	7	8	Final
(Newfoundland and Labrador) Brad Gushue	1	0	3	0	2	0	0	X	6
(Ontario) Brian Lewis	0	3	0	3	0	1	3	X	10

Sheet 2	1	2	3	4	5	6	7	8	Final
(Ontario) Wayne Tuck, Jr.	0	1	0	0	2	1	0	X	4
(China) Liu Rui	2	0	1	1	0	0	3	X	7

Sheet 3	1	2	3	4	5	6	7	8	Final
(Ontario) Dave Collyer	0	1	0	2	0	0	1	0	4
(Quebec) Philippe Lemay	2	0	1	0	1	1	0	3	8

Sheet 4	1	2	3	4	5	6	7	8	Final
(Alberta) Kevin Koe	0	0	1	1	1	3	X	X	6
(Ontario) Mark Kean	1	1	0	0	0	0	X	X	2

Sheet 5	1	2	3	4	5	6	7	8	Final
(Ontario) Brad Jacobs	0	1	0	2	0	4	X	X	7
(New York (state)) Heath McCormick	1	0	1	0	0	0	X	X	2

Sheet 6	1	2	3	4	5	6	7	8	Final
(Quebec) Martin Ferland	0	0	0	0	0	0	1	X	1
(Manitoba) Jeff Stoughton	1	0	0	1	2	1	0	X	5

==== Draw 3 ====
September 13, 9:30 PM

Sheet 1	1	2	3	4	5	6	7	8	Final
(Ontario) Matt Paul	2	0	3	0	0	1	0	0	6
(Ontario) John Epping	0	1	0	3	1	0	1	2	8

Sheet 2	1	2	3	4	5	6	7	8	Final
(Quebec) Jean-Michel Ménard	0	0	2	1	0	5	X	X	8
(Quebec) Robert Desjardins	0	1	0	0	2	0	X	X	3

Sheet 4	1	2	3	4	5	6	7	8	Final
(Quebec) Guy Hemmings	0	0	2	0	1	0	X	X	3
(Minnesota) Pete Fenson	0	4	0	0	0	4	X	X	8

==== Draw 4 ====
September 14, 8:00 AM

Sheet 1	1	2	3	4	5	6	7	8	Final
(Ontario) Dave Collyer	0	0	0	0	1	X	X	X	1
(Ontario) Wayne Tuck, Jr.	2	1	3	3	0	X	X	X	9

Sheet 2	1	2	3	4	5	6	7	8	Final
(New York (state)) Heath McCormick	1	0	2	1	0	3	1	X	8
(Ontario) Brian Lewis	0	1	0	0	2	0	0	X	3

Sheet 3	1	2	3	4	5	6	7	8	9	Final
(China) Liu Rui	0	0	2	0	1	0	0	0	1	4
(Ontario) Mark Kean	0	1	0	1	0	0	0	1	0	3

Sheet 4	1	2	3	4	5	6	7	8	Final
(Ontario) Brad Jacobs	1	1	2	0	1	X	X	X	5
(Ontario) Dwayne Fowler	0	0	0	0	0	X	X	X	0

Sheet 5	1	2	3	4	5	6	7	8	Final
(Newfoundland and Labrador) Brad Gushue	1	0	3	3	0	X	X	X	7
(Ontario) Joe Frans	0	1	0	0	2	X	X	X	3

Sheet 6	1	2	3	4	5	6	7	8	Final
(Quebec) Philippe Lemay	0	2	0	1	0	1	0	0	4
(Alberta) Kevin Koe	0	0	1	0	1	0	2	2	6

==== Draw 5 ====
September 14, 10:15 AM

Sheet 1	1	2	3	4	5	6	7	8	Final
(Quebec) Martin Ferland	2	0	0	1	0	4	0	1	8
(Switzerland) Sven Michel	0	1	1	0	2	0	2	0	6

Sheet 4	1	2	3	4	5	6	7	8	Final
(Ontario) Brian Cochrane	0	1	1	0	0	2	0	0	4
(Manitoba) Jeff Stoughton	1	0	0	2	1	0	0	1	5

Sheet 5	1	2	3	4	5	6	7	8	Final
(Quebec) Pierre Charette	1	1	0	4	0	0	2	X	8
(Ontario) Denis Cordick	0	0	0	0	2	1	0	X	3

==== Draw 6 ====
September 14, 1:00 PM

Sheet 1	1	2	3	4	5	6	7	8	Final
(Quebec) Guy Hemmings	0	0	0	X	X	X	X	X	0
(Quebec) Jean-Michel Ménard	3	1	1	X	X	X	X	X	5

Sheet 3	1	2	3	4	5	6	7	8	Final
(Quebec) Robert Desjardins	0	0	0	0	0	1	0	X	1
(Ontario) John Epping	2	0	0	1	1	0	2	X	6

Sheet 5	1	2	3	4	5	6	7	8	Final
(Minnesota) Pete Fenson	3	1	0	2	X	X	X	X	6
(Ontario) Matt Paul	0	0	2	0	X	X	X	X	2

==== Draw 7 ====
September 14, 3:15 PM

Sheet 1	1	2	3	4	5	6	7	8	Final
(Ontario) Mark Kean	0	2	0	0	2	0	0	1	5
(Quebec) Philippe Lemay	0	0	1	1	0	0	1	0	3

Sheet 2	1	2	3	4	5	6	7	8	Final
(Newfoundland and Labrador) Brad Gushue	2	1	1	1	0	2	X	X	7
(Ontario) Dwayne Fowler	0	0	0	0	2	0	X	X	1

Sheet 3	1	2	3	4	5	6	7	8	9	Final
(Alberta) Kevin Koe	0	2	0	2	1	0	0	1	1	7
(Ontario) Wayne Tuck, Jr.	2	0	1	0	0	2	1	0	0	6

Sheet 4	1	2	3	4	5	6	7	8	Final
(Ontario) Joe Frans	0	1	1	0	0	2	0	1	5
(New York (state)) Heath McCormick	1	0	0	0	1	0	1	0	3

Sheet 5	1	2	3	4	5	6	7	8	Final
(China) Liu Rui	1	0	0	1	1	0	0	0	3
(Ontario) Dave Collyer	0	1	1	0	0	1	0	1	4

Sheet 6	1	2	3	4	5	6	7	8	Final
(Ontario) Brian Lewis	0	1	0	1	0	X	X	X	2
(Ontario) Brad Jacobs	1	0	2	0	2	X	X	X	5

==== Draw 8 ====
September 14, 6:00 PM

Sheet 2	1	2	3	4	5	6	7	8	Final
(Ontario) John Epping	2	0	1	0	0	1	0	X	4
(Quebec) Guy Hemmings	0	1	0	2	2	0	3	X	8

Sheet 3	1	2	3	4	5	6	7	8	Final
(Minnesota) Pete Fenson	0	3	0	4	0	2	X	X	9
(Quebec) Jean-Michel Ménard	1	0	2	0	1	0	X	X	4

Sheet 6	1	2	3	4	5	6	7	8	Final
(Ontario) Matt Paul	0	1	0	1	0	X	X	X	2
(Quebec) Robert Desjardins	1	0	3	0	4	X	X	X	8

==== Draw 9 ====
September 14, 8:30 PM

Sheet 2	1	2	3	4	5	6	7	8	Final
(Manitoba) Jeff Stoughton	2	3	1	1	0	X	X	X	7
(Ontario) Denis Cordick	0	0	0	0	1	X	X	X	1

Sheet 4	1	2	3	4	5	6	7	8	Final
(Quebec) Martin Ferland	1	0	0	2	0	2	0	X	5
(Quebec) Pierre Charette	0	2	1	0	3	0	2	X	8

Sheet 6	1	2	3	4	5	6	7	8	Final
(Ontario) Brian Cochrane	1	0	0	2	0	1	0	1	5
(Switzerland) Sven Michel	0	0	1	0	1	0	2	0	4

==== Draw 10 ====
September 15, 8:00 AM

Sheet 3	1	2	3	4	5	6	7	8	Final
(Quebec) Guy Hemmings	0	0	1	0	0	X	X	X	1
(Quebec) Robert Desjardins	1	2	0	3	2	X	X	X	8

Sheet 4	1	2	3	4	5	6	7	8	Final
(Quebec) Jean-Michel Ménard	0	3	0	1	0	2	0	X	6
(Ontario) Matt Paul	1	0	1	0	0	0	1	X	3

Sheet 6	1	2	3	4	5	6	7	8	Final
(Minnesota) Pete Fenson	0	0	0	2	0	0	0	X	2
(Ontario) John Epping	1	0	1	0	0	0	2	X	4

==== Draw 11 ====
September 15, 10:15 AM

Sheet 4	1	2	3	4	5	6	7	8	Final
(Quebec) Pierre Charette	0	1	0	0	1	0	X	X	2
(Manitoba) Jeff Stoughton	1	0	2	1	0	4	X	X	8

Sheet 5	1	2	3	4	5	6	7	8	Final
(Quebec) Matin Ferland	1	1	4	0	3	X	X	X	9
(Ontario) Brian Cochrane	0	0	0	2	0	X	X	X	2

Sheet 6	1	2	3	4	5	6	7	8	Final
(Switzerland) Sven Michel	1	0	2	0	0	0	0	X	3
(Ontario) Denis Cordick	0	0	0	0	1	0	0	X	1

==== Draw 12 ====
September 15, 1:00 PM

Sheet 1	1	2	3	4	5	6	7	8	Final
(Ontario) Dwayne Fowler	1	0	0	0	2	0	2	0	5
(Ontario) Brian Lewis	0	2	2	1	0	1	0	1	7

Team	1	2	3	4	5	6	7	8	Final
(Alberta) Kevin Koe	0	2	0	2	2	2	X	X	8
(Ontario) Dave Collyer	2	0	1	0	0	0	X	X	3

Sheet 3	1	2	3	4	5	6	7	8	Final
(Ontario) Brad Jacobs	0	3	1	0	2	0	0	X	6
(Ontario) Joe Frans	0	0	0	1	0	2	1	X	4

Sheet 4	1	2	3	4	5	6	7	8	Final
(China) Liu Rui	2	0	0	0	1	0	2	1	6
(Quebec) Philippe Lemay	0	2	0	1	0	2	0	0	5

Sheet 5	1	2	3	4	5	6	7	8	Final
(Ontario) Mark Kean	3	0	0	0	0	2	1	1	7
(Ontario) Wayne Tuck, Jr.	0	0	2	1	2	0	0	0	5

Sheet 6	1	2	3	4	5	6	7	8	9	Final
(New York (state)) Heath McCormick	1	0	0	0	0	0	2	2	1	6
(Newfoundland and Labrador) Brad Gushue	0	1	1	1	1	1	0	0	0	5

==== Draw 13 ====
September 15, 3:15 PM

Sheet 1	1	2	3	4	5	6	7	8	Final
(Quebec) Guy Hemmings	0	2	0	0	0	1	0	X	3
(Ontario) Matt Paul	1	0	1	2	1	0	1	X	6

Sheet 4	1	2	3	4	5	6	7	8	Final
(Quebec) Robert Desjardins	1	0	1	0	0	0	X	X	2
(Minnesota) Pete Fenson	0	2	0	1	0	3	X	X	6

Sheet 5	1	2	3	4	5	6	7	8	Final
(Quebec) Jean-Michel Ménard	0	1	0	1	0	1	2	0	5
(Ontario) John Epping	0	0	2	0	4	0	0	1	7

==== Draw 14 ====
September 15, 6:00 PM

Sheet 1	1	2	3	4	5	6	7	8	Final
(Quebec) Pierre Charette	0	2	0	1	0	2	1	0	6
(Ontario) Brian Cochrane	4	0	2	0	1	0	0	0	7

Sheet 2	1	2	3	4	5	6	7	8	Final
(Quebec) Martin Ferland	1	2	1	2	X	X	X	X	6
(Ontario) Denis Cordick	0	0	0	0	X	X	X	X	0

Sheet 5	1	2	3	4	5	6	7	8	Final
(Switzerland) Sven Michel	0	0	2	0	0	3	0	1	6
(Manitoba) Jeff Stoughton	1	0	0	1	0	0	2	0	4

==== Draw 15 ====
September 15, 8:30 PM

Sheet 1	1	2	3	4	5	6	7	8	Final
(Alberta) Kevin Koe	0	0	2	0	1	2	0	3	8
(China) Liu Rui	3	0	0	1	0	0	2	0	6

Sheet 2	1	2	3	4	5	6	7	8	Final
(Ontario) Brad Jacobs	0	0	1	0	X	X	X	X	1
(Newfoundland and Labrador) Brad Gushue	0	2	0	3	X	X	X	X	5

Sheet 3	1	2	3	4	5	6	7	8	Final
(Ontario) Mark Kean	2	0	4	X	X	X	X	X	6
(Ontario) Dave Collyer	0	1	0	X	X	X	X	X	1

Sheet 4	1	2	3	4	5	6	7	8	Final
(Ontario) Brian Lewis	1	0	0	0	0	0	X	X	1
(Ontario) Joe Frans	0	0	1	1	0	1	X	X	3

Sheet 5	1	2	3	4	5	6	7	8	Final
(New York (state)) Heath McCormick	0	0	1	2	0	1	0	0	4
(Ontario) Dwayne Fowler	0	1	0	0	2	0	1	1	5

Sheet 6	1	2	3	4	5	6	7	8	Final
(Ontario) Wayne Tuck, Jr.	0	0	0	0	3	X	X	X	3
(Quebec) Philippe Lemay	0	2	1	2	0	X	X	X	5

== Playoffs ==
Quarterfinals
(Alberta) Kevin Koe	9
(Ontario) Mark Kean	5
(Manitoba) Jeff Stoughton	7
(Minnesota) Pete Fenson	4
(Ontario) Brad Jacobs	7
(Quebec) Jean-Michel Ménard	4
(Ontario) John Epping	5
(Quebec) Pierre Charette	0

Semifinals
(Alberta) Kevin Koe	5
(Manitoba) Jeff Stoughton	6
(Ontario) Brad Jacobs	4
(Ontario) John Epping	5

Final
(Manitoba) Jeff Stoughton	2
(Ontario) John Epping	5

=== Quarterfinal ===
September 16, 9:00 AM

Team	1	2	3	4	5	6	7	8	Final
(Alberta) Kevin Koe	2	0	1	0	2	1	3	X	9
(Ontario) Mark Kean	0	2	0	3	0	0	0	X	5

Team	1	2	3	4	5	6	7	8	Final
(Manitoba) Jeff Stoughton	0	2	0	2	0	3	0	X	7
(Minnesota) Pete Fenson	1	0	1	0	2	0	0	X	4

Team	1	2	3	4	5	6	7	8	Final
(Ontario) Brad Jacobs	3	0	1	0	2	1	X	X	7
(Quebec) Jean-Michel Ménard	0	2	0	2	0	0	X	X	4

Team	1	2	3	4	5	6	7	8	Final
(Ontario) John Epping	2	1	1	1	X	X	X	X	5
(Quebec) Pierre Charette	0	0	0	0	X	X	X	X	0

=== Semifinal ===
September 16, 12:30 PM

Team	1	2	3	4	5	6	7	8	Final
(Alberta) Kevin Koe	2	0	0	1	0	0	2	0	5
(Manitoba) Jeff Stoughton	0	2	0	0	2	1	0	1	6

Team	1	2	3	4	5	6	7	8	9	Final
(Ontario) Brad Jacobs	0	0	0	2	0	1	0	1	0	4
(Ontario) John Epping	0	1	0	0	2	0	1	0	1	5

=== Final ===
September 16, 3:30 PM

Team	1	2	3	4	5	6	7	8	Final
(Manitoba) Jeff Stoughton	0	0	0	0	1	1	0	X	2
(Ontario) John Epping	0	2	0	1	0	0	2	X	5

== Women ==
=== Teams ===
Skip	Third	Second	Lead	Locale
Chrissy Cadorin	Janet Langevinl	Sandy Becher	Cindy McKnight	Toronto, Ontario
Lisa Farnell	Erin Morrissey	Karen Sagle	Ainsley Galbraith	Elgin, Ontario
Jaimee Gardner	Allison Farrell	Kim Brown	Trish Scharf	Ottawa, Ontario
Jacqueline Harrison	Kimberly Tuck	Susan Froud	Heather Nicol	Waterdown, Ontario
Jennifer Harvey	Lisa Lalonde	Julie Bridger	Lynn Macdonell	Cornwall, Ontario
Rachel Homan	Emma Miskew	Alison Kreviazuk	Lisa Weagle	Ottawa, Ontario
Tracy Horgan	Jenn Seabrook	Jenna Enge	Amanda Gates	Sudbury, Ontario
Marie-France Larouche	Brenda Nicholls	Véronique Grégoire	Amélie Blais	Levis, Quebec
Robyn Mattie	Lauren Mann	Patricia Hill	Andrea Leganchuk	Ottawa, Ontario
Sherry Middaugh	Jo-Ann Rizzo	Lee Merklinger	Leigh Armstrong	Coldwater, Ontario
Eve Muirhead	Anna Sloan	Vicki Adams	Claire Hamilton	Stirling, Scotland
Allison Ross	Audree Dufresne	Brittany O'Rourke	Sasha Beauchamp	Howick, Quebec

== Standings ==
Pool A	W	L
(Ontario) Sherry Middaugh	5	0
(Quebec) Marie-France Larouche	4	1
(Ontario) Tracy Horgan	3	2
(Ontario) Jaimee Gardner	2	3
(Ontario) Chrissy Cadorin	1	4
(Ontario) Robyn Mattie	0	5

Pool B	W	L
(Scotland) Eve Muirhead	5	0
(Ontario) Rachel Homan	3	2
(Ontario) Lisa Farnell	2	3
(Ontario) Jennifer Harvey	2	3
(Quebec) Allison Ross	2	3
(Ontario) Jacqueline Harrison	1	4

== Results ==
=== Draw 1 ===
September 13, 4:00 PM

Sheet 1	1	2	3	4	5	6	7	8	Final
(Scotland) Eve Muirhead	0	1	0	0	4	1	0	X	6
(Quebec) Allison Ross	0	0	0	1	0	0	2	X	3

Sheet 5	1	2	3	4	5	6	7	8	Final
(Ontario) Jacqueline Harrison	0	0	0	1	0	2	1	X	4
(Ontario) Rachel Homan	0	1	2	0	3	0	0	X	6

Sheet 6	1	2	3	4	5	6	7	8	Final
(Ontario) Jennifer Harvey	0	0	0	3	1	0	X	X	4
(Ontario) Lisa Farnell	3	4	1	0	0	2	X	X	10

=== Draw 3 ===
September 13, 9:30 PM

Sheet 3	1	2	3	4	5	6	7	8	Final
(Ontario) Sherry Middaugh	0	3	0	0	5	X	X	X	8
(Ontario) Jamiee Gardner	2	0	0	1	0	X	X	X	3

Sheet 5	1	2	3	4	5	6	7	8	Final
(Quebec) Marie-France Larouche	0	2	1	1	0	0	1	X	5
(Ontario) Tracy Horgan	0	0	0	0	2	0	0	X	2

Sheet 6	1	2	3	4	5	6	7	8	Final
(Ontario) Robyn Mattie	0	0	1	1	0	1	1	0	4
(Ontario) Chrissy Cadorin	0	2	0	0	2	0	0	1	5

=== Draw 5 ===
September 14, 10:15 AM

Sheet 2	1	2	3	4	5	6	7	8	Final
(Ontario) Jamiee Gardner	0	0	0	1	0	2	0	X	3
(Ontario) Tracy Horgan	1	1	2	0	1	0	1	X	6

Sheet 3	1	2	3	4	5	6	7	8	Final
(Ontario) Robyn Mattie	0	1	3	0	0	1	1	0	6
(Quebec) Marie-France Larouche	2	0	0	3	1	0	0	1	7

Sheet 6	1	2	3	4	5	6	7	8	Final
(Ontario) Chrissy Cadorin	1	0	0	1	0	2	0	X	4
(Ontario) Sherry Middaugh	0	2	3	0	1	0	4	X	10

=== Draw 6 ===
September 14, 1:00 PM

Sheet 2	1	2	3	4	5	6	7	8	Final
(Ontario) Jennifer Harvey	0	0	0	1	X	X	X	X	1
(Scotland) Eve Muirhead	2	1	3	0	X	X	X	X	6

Sheet 4	1	2	3	4	5	6	7	8	Final
(Ontario) Lisa Farnell	0	1	0	2	0	2	0	X	5
(Ontario) Jacqueline Harrison	0	0	1	0	1	0	1	X	3

Sheet 6	1	2	3	4	5	6	7	8	Final
(Ontario) Rachel Homan	0	1	1	0	0	0	0	1	3
(Quebec) Allison Ross	1	0	0	0	0	1	0	0	2

=== Draw 8 ===
September 14, 6:00 PM

Sheet 1	1	2	3	4	5	6	7	8	Final
(Ontario) Robyn Mattie	1	0	0	0	1	0	X	X	2
(Ontario) Tracy Horgan	0	2	1	2	0	5	X	X	10

Sheet 4	1	2	3	4	5	6	7	8	Final
(Quebec) Marie-France Larouche	0	4	0	1	0	1	1	0	7
(Ontario) Sherry Middaugh	1	0	2	0	2	0	0	3	8

Sheet 5	1	2	3	4	5	6	7	8	Final
(Ontario) Chrissy Cadorin	1	0	1	0	0	3	0	X	5
(Ontario) Jamiee Gardner	0	2	0	2	1	0	4	X	9

=== Draw 9 ===
September 14, 8:30 PM

Sheet 1	1	2	3	4	5	6	7	8	9	Final
(Ontario) Lisa Farnell	0	1	3	0	2	0	0	1	0	7
(Ontario) Rachel Homan	3	0	0	2	0	1	1	0	4	11

Sheet 3	1	2	3	4	5	6	7	8	Final
(Ontario) Jacqueline Harrison	0	1	0	1	0	0	X	X	2
(Scotland) Eve Muirhead	2	0	1	0	0	4	X	X	7

Sheet 5	1	2	3	4	5	6	7	8	9	Final
(Quebec) Allison Ross	0	1	1	3	0	0	0	1	0	6
(Ontario) Jennifer Harvey	2	0	0	0	1	1	2	0	1	7

=== Draw 10 ===
September 15, 8:00 AM

Sheet 1	1	2	3	4	5	6	7	8	Final
(Ontario) Jamiee Gardner	0	0	1	0	1	1	0	X	3
(Quebec) Marie-France Larouche	1	2	0	1	0	0	4	X	8

Sheet 2	1	2	3	4	5	6	7	8	Final
(Ontario) Tracy Horgan	1	1	0	2	1	0	3	X	8
(Ontario) Chrissy Cadorin	0	0	1	0	0	2	0	X	3

Sheet 5	1	2	3	4	5	6	7	8	Final
(Ontario) Sherry Middaugh	1	1	2	3	X	X	X	X	7
(Ontario) Robyn Mattie	0	0	0	0	X	X	X	X	0

=== Draw 11 ===
September 15, 10:15 AM

Sheet 1	1	2	3	4	5	6	7	8	Final
(Ontario) Jacqueline Harrison	0	0	0	X	X	X	X	X	0
(Quebec) Allison Ross	3	4	0	X	X	X	X	X	7

Sheet 2	1	2	3	4	5	6	7	8	Final
(Ontario) Lisa Farnell	0	0	1	1	0	2	0	X	4
(Scotland) Eve Muirhead	1	1	0	0	2	0	4	X	8

Sheet 3	1	2	3	4	5	6	7	8	9	Final
(Ontario) Rachel Homan	2	0	0	0	2	1	0	2	0	7
(Ontario) Jennifer Harvey	0	2	1	2	0	0	2	0	1	8

=== Draw 13 ===
September 15, 3:15 PM

Sheet 2	1	2	3	4	5	6	7	8	Final
(Ontario) Robyn Mattie	0	0	0	0	1	0	2	X	3
(Ontario) Jamiee Gardner	1	1	1	1	0	2	0	X	6

Sheet 3	1	2	3	4	5	6	7	8	Final
(Ontario) Chrissy Cadorin	0	1	1	0	0	1	0	X	3
(Quebec) Marie-France Larouche	0	0	0	2	1	0	4	X	7

Sheet 6	1	2	3	4	5	6	7	8	Final
(Ontario) Tracy Horgan	1	0	0	0	3	0	1	0	5
(Ontario) Sherry Middaugh	0	2	2	1	0	1	0	1	7

=== Draw 14 ===
September 15, 6:00 PM

Sheet 3	1	2	3	4	5	6	7	8	Final
(Quebec) Allison Ross	0	0	1	1	0	1	1	1	5
(Ontario) Lisa Farnell	1	0	0	0	0	0	0	0	1

Sheet 4	1	2	3	4	5	6	7	8	Final
(Scotland) Eve Muirhead	0	0	0	2	1	0	1	1	5
(Ontario) Rachel Homan	0	0	1	0	0	1	0	0	2

Sheet 6	1	2	3	4	5	6	7	8	Final
(Ontario) Jacqueline Harrison	1	1	0	0	3	X	X	X	5
(Ontario) Jennifer Harvey	0	0	0	1	0	X	X	X	1

== Playoffs ==
Semifinals
1	(Ontario) Sherry Middaugh	5
4	(Ontario) Tracy Horgan	6
3	(Scotland) Eve Muirhead	8
2	(Quebec) Marie-France Larouche	1

Finals
(Ontario) Tracy Horgan	5
(Scotland) Eve Muirhead	1

=== Semifinal ===
September 16, 12:30 PM

Team	1	2	3	4	5	6	7	8	Final
(Ontario) Sherry Middaugh	2	0	1	0	0	2	0	0	5
(Ontario) Tracy Horgan	0	2	0	1	0	0	2	1	6

Team	1	2	3	4	5	6	7	8	Final
(Scotland) Eve Muirhead	1	0	4	3	X	X	X	X	8
(Quebec) Marie-France Larouche	0	1	0	0	X	X	X	X	1

=== Final ===
September 16, 3:30 PM

Team	1	2	3	4	5	6	7	8	Final
(Ontario) Tracy Horgan	0	1	0	1	0	1	2	X	5
(Scotland) Eve Muirhead	0	0	1	0	0	0	0	X	1
