= 2011 Quebec Men's Provincial Curling Championship =

- Host city: Buckingham, Quebec
- Arena: Centre sportif de Buckingham
- Dates: January 30–February 6
- Winner: Team Gagné
- Curling club: CC Chicoutimi, Chicoutimi, Quebec
- Skip: François Gagné
- Third: Robert Desjardins
- Second: Christian Bouchard
- Lead: Philippe Ménard
- Finalist: Jean-Michel Ménard

The 2011 Quebec Men's Provincial Curling Championship (also known as the Quebec Tankard) was held January 30-February 6 at the Centre sportif de Buckingham in Buckingham, Quebec. The winning team of François Gagné represented Quebec at the 2011 Tim Hortons Brier in London, Ontario.

== Teams ==
Skip	Third	Second	Lead	Club(s)
Daniel Bédard	Jean-Pierre Venne	Simon Lejour	Sylvain Lejour	Club de curling de Lacolle, Lacolle
Michel Briand	Daniel Grégoire	David Robillard	Yves Patenaude	Club de curling Longue-Pointe, Montreal
Martin Ferland	François Roberge	Shawn Fowler	Maxime Elmaleh	Club de curling Etchemin, Saint-Romuald/Club de curling Laviolette, Trois-Rivières
François Gagné	Robert Desjardins	Christian Bouchard	Philippe Ménard	Club de curling Chicoutimi, Chicoutimi
Guy Hemmings	Simon Dupuis	Jean-Michel Arsenault	Erik Lachance	Club de curling Etchemin, Saint-Romuald
Frederic Lawton	Benoit Vézeau	Daniel Gilbert	Martin Lavoie	Glenmore Curling Club/Baie D'Urfé Curling Club, Dollard-des-Ormeaux/Baie-D'Urfé
Yannick Martel	Michel Beaudet	Sébastien Simard	Stéphane Palin	Club de curling Kénogami, Jonquière
Jean-Michel Ménard	Martin Crête	Éric Sylvain	Jean Gagnon	Club de curling Etchemin, Saint-Romuald
Serge Reid	François Gionest	Simon Collin	Steeve Villeneuve	Club de curling Kénogami, Jonquière
Jean-Sébastien Roy	Steven Munroe	Philippe Brassard	Dany Beaulieu	Club de curling Etchemin, Saint-Romuald

== Standings ==
Skip (Club)	W	L	PF	PA	Ends Won	Ends Lost	Blank Ends	Stolen Ends
Jean-Michel Ménard (Etchemin)	7	2	67	45	39	30	6	9
Serge Reid (Kénogami)	6	3	67	60	43	39	2	14
Daniel Bédard (Lacolle)	6	3	53	53	35	36	8	8
François Gagné (Chicoutimi)	6	3	52	47	33	34	14	8
Guy Hemmings (Etchemin)	6	3	61	52	36	35	6	7
Martin Ferland (Etchemin/Laviolette)	3	6	64	63	37	34	7	10
Fredric Lawton (Baie D'Urfé/Glenmore)	3	6	54	60	38	39	4	13
Yannick Martel (Kénogami)	3	6	50	64	35	34	10	10
Michel Briand (Longue-Pointe)	3	6	49	62	31	34	6	9
Jean-Sébastien Roy (Etchemin)	2	7	49	59	33	42	7	9

== Results ==
=== Draw 1 ===
January 31, 12:00 PM

Sheet A	1	2	3	4	5	6	7	8	9	10	11	Final
Hemmings	1	0	2	0	0	2	1	0	2	0	1	9
Ménard	0	2	0	0	3	0	0	1	0	2	0	8

Sheet B	1	2	3	4	5	6	7	8	9	10	Final
Briand	0	2	0	2	0	1	1	0	0	X	6
Roy	4	0	1	0	1	0	0	0	2	X	8

Sheet C	1	2	3	4	5	6	7	8	9	10	Final
Ferland	0	2	0	2	0	0	1	0	2	0	7
Martel	1	0	1	0	1	0	0	4	0	1	8

Sheet D	1	2	3	4	5	6	7	8	9	10	Final
Reid	1	0	0	0	1	2	1	0	0	0	5
Lawton	0	2	1	1	0	0	0	2	1	2	9

Sheet E	1	2	3	4	5	6	7	8	9	10	Final
Bédard	0	1	1	0	3	0	3	0	1	X	9
Gagné	0	0	0	2	0	2	0	1	0	X	5

=== Draw 2 ===
January 31, 7:45 PM

Sheet A	1	2	3	4	5	6	7	8	9	10	Final
Gagné	0	2	0	0	0	0	0	2	1	0	5
Martel	0	0	1	2	0	0	0	0	0	1	4

Sheet B	1	2	3	4	5	6	7	8	9	10	Final
Bédard	0	0	1	0	0	0	X	X	X	X	1
Ménard	3	0	0	2	0	2	X	X	X	X	7

Sheet C	1	2	3	4	5	6	7	8	9	10	Final
Hemmings	0	1	0	2	1	0	4	0	1	X	9
Lawton	1	0	2	0	0	2	0	1	0	X	6

Sheet D	1	2	3	4	5	6	7	8	9	10	Final
Ferland	0	2	0	1	1	2	3	1	X	X	10
Briand	2	0	2	0	0	0	0	0	X	X	4

Sheet E	1	2	3	4	5	6	7	8	9	10	Final
Reid	0	0	1	0	2	1	1	0	0	2	7
Roy	1	1	0	1	0	0	0	2	1	0	6

=== Draw 3 ===
February 1, 12:00 PM

Sheet A	1	2	3	4	5	6	7	8	9	10	Final
Ménard	1	0	3	0	3	0	1	X	X	X	8
Lawton	0	1	0	1	0	1	0	X	X	X	3

Sheet B	1	2	3	4	5	6	7	8	9	10	Final
Reid	0	1	0	2	1	0	2	0	0	X	6
Briand	2	0	3	0	0	2	0	2	1	X	10

Sheet C	1	2	3	4	5	6	7	8	9	10	Final
Martel	0	1	0	0	2	0	0	X	X	X	3
Hemmings	4	0	2	1	0	0	2	X	X	X	9

Sheet D	1	2	3	4	5	6	7	8	9	10	Final
Roy	1	1	0	0	0	0	0	1	1	0	4
Gagné	0	0	1	1	1	0	0	0	0	2	5

Sheet E	1	2	3	4	5	6	7	8	9	10	Final
Ferland	0	1	1	0	2	0	2	1	0	0	7
Bédard	1	0	0	0	0	4	0	0	2	1	8

=== Draw 4 ===
February 1, 7:30 PM

Sheet A	1	2	3	4	5	6	7	8	9	10	Final
Ferland	0	1	0	2	1	0	2	0	2	X	8
Roy	0	0	1	0	0	2	0	1	0	X	4

Sheet B	1	2	3	4	5	6	7	8	9	10	Final
Gagné	0	0	1	0	0	1	0	1	0	X	3
Hemmings	0	1	0	2	0	0	2	0	1	X	6

Sheet C	1	2	3	4	5	6	7	8	9	10	Final
Briand	0	0	1	0	1	0	X	X	X	X	2
Ménard	0	3	0	4	0	3	X	X	X	X	10

Sheet D	1	2	3	4	5	6	7	8	9	10	Final
Lawton	1	1	1	0	0	0	1	0	0	0	4
Bédard	0	0	0	1	0	1	0	1	1	2	6

Sheet E	1	2	3	4	5	6	7	8	9	10	Final
Martel	0	0	0	0	1	2	1	0	1	X	5
Reid	2	1	1	1	0	0	0	3	0	X	8

=== Draw 5 ===
February 2, 8:15 AM

Sheet A	1	2	3	4	5	6	7	8	9	10	Final
Bédard	2	0	0	0	1	0	0	1	0	X	4
Reid	0	2	1	1	0	2	0	0	1	X	7

Sheet B	1	2	3	4	5	6	7	8	9	10	11	Final
Martel	0	2	0	1	1	0	0	0	2	0	1	7
Lawton	0	0	1	0	0	0	0	3	0	2	0	6

Sheet C	1	2	3	4	5	6	7	8	9	10	Final
Gagné	2	0	0	2	1	0	0	0	0	X	5
Briand	0	1	2	0	0	0	0	0	1	X	4

Sheet D	1	2	3	4	5	6	7	8	9	10	Final
Ménard	1	1	0	0	1	1	2	X	X	X	6
Roy	0	0	0	1	0	0	0	X	X	X	1

Sheet E	1	2	3	4	5	6	7	8	9	10	Final
Hemmings	0	0	0	0	1	0	X	X	X	X	1
Ferland	3	0	1	1	0	3	X	X	X	X	8

=== Draw 6 ===
February 2, 3:45 PM

Sheet A	1	2	3	4	5	6	7	8	9	10	Final
Martel	0	0	0	0	2	0	0	1	0	X	3
Briand	2	1	1	0	0	2	1	0	2	X	9

Sheet B	1	2	3	4	5	6	7	8	9	10	Final
Hemmings	0	0	2	0	1	0	2	0	1	X	6
Bédard	1	1	0	2	0	3	0	1	0	X	8

Sheet C	1	2	3	4	5	6	7	8	9	10	11	Final
Ménard	0	2	0	1	0	1	0	1	1	0	1	7
Reid	1	0	2	0	1	0	1	0	0	1	0	6

Sheet D	1	2	3	4	5	6	7	8	9	10	Final
Gagné	1	0	3	1	0	1	0	0	2	X	8
Ferland	0	2	0	0	0	0	1	1	0	X	4

Sheet E	1	2	3	4	5	6	7	8	9	10	Final
Roy	0	1	0	1	0	0	3	0	1	X	6
Lawton	1	0	2	0	2	3	0	1	0	X	9

=== Draw 7 ===
February 3, 8:15 AM

Sheet A	1	2	3	4	5	6	7	8	9	10	Final
Lawton	1	1	0	1	0	0	2	0	0	X	5
Gagné	0	0	4	0	1	1	0	1	2	X	9

Sheet B	1	2	3	4	5	6	7	8	9	10	Final
Ferland	0	3	0	2	0	3	0	2	0	X	10
Reid	4	0	2	0	3	0	2	0	1	X	12

Sheet C	1	2	3	4	5	6	7	8	9	10	11	Final
Bédard	0	1	0	2	0	0	1	1	1	0	1	7
Roy	2	0	2	0	0	1	0	0	0	1	0	6

Sheet D	1	2	3	4	5	6	7	8	9	10	Final
Martel	2	0	2	0	1	0	0	0	1	1	7
Ménard	0	1	0	2	0	3	1	1	0	0	8

Sheet E	1	2	3	4	5	6	7	8	9	10	Final
Briand	0	0	1	0	1	1	0	0	X	X	3
Hemmings	1	4	0	1	0	0	1	2	X	X	9

=== Draw 8 ===
February 3, 3:30 PM

Sheet A	1	2	3	4	5	6	7	8	9	10	Final
Briand	0	0	1	0	1	0	1	0	X	X	3
Bédard	0	3	0	2	0	1	0	2	X	X	8

Sheet B	1	2	3	4	5	6	7	8	9	10	Final
Roy	1	5	0	3	0	0	0	1	X	X	10
Martel	0	0	2	0	1	1	1	0	X	X	5

Sheet C	1	2	3	4	5	6	7	8	9	10	Final
Lawton	3	1	1	0	0	2	0	1	1	X	9
Ferland	0	0	0	2	2	0	1	0	0	X	5

Sheet D	1	2	3	4	5	6	7	8	9	10	Final
Hemmings	2	0	3	0	0	0	1	0	0	X	6
Reid	0	1	0	2	1	2	0	2	1	X	9

Sheet E	1	2	3	4	5	6	7	8	9	10	Final
Gagné	0	2	0	1	0	2	0	3	X	X	8
Ménard	1	0	1	0	1	0	1	0	X	X	4

=== Draw 9 ===
February 4, 12:00 PM

Sheet A	1	2	3	4	5	6	7	8	9	10	Final
Roy	0	1	1	0	1	1	0	0	0	X	4
Hemmings	1	0	0	3	0	0	1	0	1	X	6

Sheet B	1	2	3	4	5	6	7	8	9	10	Final
Ménard	0	0	4	1	0	2	0	0	1	1	9
Ferland	2	0	0	0	1	0	0	2	0	0	5

Sheet C	1	2	3	4	5	6	7	8	9	10	Final
Reid	2	0	1	0	3	0	1	0	X	X	7
Gagne	0	0	0	1	0	2	0	1	X	X	4

Sheet D	1	2	3	4	5	6	7	8	9	10	Final
Bédard	1	0	1	0	0	0	0	X	X	X	2
Martel	0	4	0	1	1	1	1	X	X	X	8

Sheet E	1	2	3	4	5	6	7	8	9	10	Final
Lawton	0	0	0	1	1	0	1	X	X	X	3
Briand	3	2	1	0	0	2	0	X	X	X	8

=== Tie Breaker ===
February 4, 3:45 PM

Sheet E	1	2	3	4	5	6	7	8	9	10	Final
Gagné	2	1	0	3	1	X	X	X	X	X	7
Hemmings	0	0	1	0	0	X	X	X	X	X	1

== Playoffs ==
Page playoff system
1	Jean-Michel Ménard	10
2	Serge Reid	1
3	Daniel Bédard	7
4	François Gagné	10

Semifinal
2	Serge Reid	6
4	François Gagné	7

Final
1	Jean-Michel Ménard	7
4	François Gagné	8

=== 1 vs. 2 ===
February 5, 2:00 PM

Sheet A	1	2	3	4	5	6	7	8	9	10	Final
Ménard	0	2	3	2	0	3	X	X	X	X	10
Reid	0	0	0	0	1	0	X	X	X	X	1

=== 3 vs. 4 ===
February 5, 2:00 PM

Sheet D	1	2	3	4	5	6	7	8	9	10	Final
Bédard	0	2	0	2	0	2	0	1	0	X	7
Gagné	2	0	1	0	3	0	3	0	1	X	10

=== Semifinal ===
February 5, 7:00 PM

Sheet B	1	2	3	4	5	6	7	8	9	10	11	Final
Reid	0	1	1	1	0	2	0	0	0	1	0	6
Gagné	1	0	0	0	1	0	2	1	1	0	1	7

=== Final ===
February 6, 4:00 PM

Sheet C	1	2	3	4	5	6	7	8	9	10	11	Final
Ménard	0	2	0	1	0	0	2	0	0	2	0	7
Gagné	0	0	1	0	1	1	0	1	3	0	1	8
