= 2012 Quebec Men's Provincial Curling Championship =

- Host city: Jonquière, Quebec
- Arena: Club de Curling Kénogami
- Dates: January 24–29
- Winner: Team Desjardins
- Curling club: CC Chicoutimi, Chicoutimi, Quebec
- Skip: Robert Desjardins
- Third: Jean-Sébastien Roy
- Second: Steven Munroe
- Lead: Steeve Villeneuve
- Finalist: Philippe Lemay

The 2012 Quebec Men's Provincial Curling Championship (also known as the Quebec Tankard) was held January 24–29, 2012 at the Club de Curling Kénogami in Jonquière, Quebec. The winning team of Robert Desjardins, represented Quebec at the 2012 Tim Hortons Brier in Saskatoon, Saskatchewan.

== Format changes ==
The 2011–2012 season saw a new format for both the men and women's provincial playdowns. The men's tournament consisted of twelve teams in a triple knockout format, and playing for spots in a four team page playoff. Eight teams, four from east Quebec and four from the west Quebec, will qualify through zones playdowns, and four teams will qualify through the points system. This change means the defending champion from the previous season will no longer receive an automatic berth into the provincial playdowns and will see two additional teams compete in the provincial playdown.

== Teams ==
Skip	Third	Second	Lead	Club(s)
Robert Desjardins	Jean-Sébastien Roy	Steven Munroe	Steeve Villeneuve	Chicoutimi
Simon Dupuis	Don Westphal	Louis Biron	Maurice Cayouette	Thurso / Buckingham
Martin Ferland	François Roberge	Shawn Fowler	Maxime Elmaleh	Etchemin
François Gagné	Ghyslain Richard	Christian Bouchard	Benoit Vezeau	Mount Royal / Laval
Steeve Gagnon	Martin Roy	Mike Coolidge	Olivier Beaulieu	Rosemère / Glenmore
Pierre Gervais	René Bouffard	Alain Maillette	Éric Lemaire	Trois-Rivières
Kevin Golberg	Chris Labar	Matthew Kennerknecht	Tyler Cooper	Pointe-Claire
Simon Hébert	Denis Laflamme	Bernard Gingras	Steve Tremblay	Baie-Comeau / Sept-Îles
Philippe Lemay	Mathieu Beaufort	Jean-Michel Arsenault	Erik Lachance	Laviolette
Frédéric Marchand	François Boudreau	Joey Fraser	Simon Brunelle	Laviolette
Jean-Michel Ménard	Martin Crête	Éric Sylvain	Philippe Ménard	Etchemin
Serge Reid	François Gionest	Simon Collin	Marc Côté	Kénogami / Alma / Roberval

== Draw Brackets ==
=== A Event ===
Round of 16
Marchand	7
Gagnon	6
Lemay	8
Gervais	3
A3	Dupuis	9
A3	Golberg	3
A4	Gagné	9
A4	Hébert	1

Quarterfinals
A5	Ménard	8
A1	Marchand	3
A2	Lemay	9
A6	Reid	4
A7	Desjardins	2
A3	Dupuis	6
A4	Gagné	7
A8	Ferland	6

Semifinals
A5	Ménard	6
A2	Lemay	8
A3	Dupuis	6
A4	Gagné	9

A Qualifier
A2	Lemay	8
A4	Gagné	3

=== B Event ===
Round of 16
Reid	5
Gagnon	8
Desjardins	9
Gervais	6
A8	Ferland	8
A3	Golberg	9
A5	Marchand	8
A4	Hébert	11

Quarterfinals
Dupuis	4
Gagnon	8
Ménard	6
Desjardins	8
Golberg	4
Hébert	5

Semifinals
Gagnon	6
Desjardins	8
Hébert	5
Gagné	6

B Qualifier
Desjardins	7
Gagné	4

=== C Event ===
Quarterfinals		Semifinals		C Qualifier 1
		Gervais	8
Reid	6	Hébert	7
Gervais	7			Gervais	9
				Gagnon	11
		Golberg	5
		Gagnon	8

Quarterfinals		Semifinals		C Qualifier 2
Ferland	9
Dupuis	4	Ferland	6
Marchand	3	Ménard	11
Ménard	9			Gagné	4
				Ménard	7

== Playoffs ==
Page playoff system
A	Philippe Lemay	8
B	Robert Desjardins	5
C1	Steeve Gagnon	7
C2	Jean-Michel Ménard	10

Semifinal
B	Robert Desjardins	7
C2	Jean-Michel Ménard	4

Final
A	Philippe Lemay	7
B	Robert Desjardins	8

=== C1 vs. C2 ===
January 28, 19:00

Sheet D	1	2	3	4	5	6	7	8	9	10	Final
Ménard	1	0	2	0	3	0	1	0	3	X	10
Gagnon	0	1	0	3	0	1	0	2	0	X	7

=== A vs. B ===
January 28, 19:00

Sheet C	1	2	3	4	5	6	7	8	9	10	Final
Lemay	2	0	0	0	0	4	0	0	2	X	8
Desjardins	0	0	2	1	1	0	0	1	0	X	5

=== Semifinal ===
January 29, 09:00

Sheet B	1	2	3	4	5	6	7	8	9	10	Final
Desjardins	1	0	0	2	0	0	1	0	3	X	7
Ménard	0	1	1	0	0	1	0	1	0	X	4

=== Final ===
January 29, 14:00

Sheet C	1	2	3	4	5	6	7	8	9	10	11	Final
Lemay	2	0	0	3	0	0	0	0	0	2	0	7
Desjardins	0	0	2	0	2	2	0	0	1	0	1	8

2012 Quebec Men's Provincial Curling Championship

Robert Desjardins
Quebec Provincial Championship title
