= 2013 Quebec Men's Provincial Curling Championship =

- Host city: Victoriaville, Quebec
- Arena: Complexe Sportif Victoriaville
- Dates: January 21–27
- Winner: Jean-Michel Ménard
- Curling club: CC Etchemin, Saint-Romuald
- Skip: Jean-Michel Ménard
- Third: Martin Crête
- Second: Éric Sylvain
- Lead: Philippe Ménard
- Finalist: Philippe Lemay

The 2013 Quebec Men's Provincial Curling Championship (also known as the Quebec Tankard) was held from January 21 to 27 at the Complexe Sportif Victoriaville in Victoriaville, Quebec. The winning team represented Quebec at the 2013 Tim Hortons Brier in Edmonton, Alberta.

== Qualification ==
Qualification method	Berths	Qualifying team(s)
Provincial Tour Champion	1	Robert Desjardins
West Zone	3	Guy Hemmings; Jean-François Royer; Steeve Gagnon
East Zone	3	Pierre Gervais; William Dion; Nicolas Marceau
Tour Qualifiers	3	Jean-Michel Ménard; Martin Ferland; Philippe Lemay

== Teams ==
The teams are listed as follows:

Skip	Third	Second	Lead	Alternate	Locale(s)
Robert Desjardins	Jean-Sébastien Roy	Steven Munroe	Steeve Villeneuve		Club de curling Chicoutimi, Chicoutimi
William Dion	Germain Bernier	Emmanuel Lavigne	Miguel Bernard		Club Sportif Celanese, Drummondville; Club de curling Laurier, Victoriaville
Martin Ferland	François Roberge	Shawn Fowler	Maxime Elmaleh	Dwayne Fowler	Club de curling Etchemin, Saint-Romuald
Steeve Gagnon	Martin Roy	Mike Coolidge	Maurice Cayouette	Olivier Beaulieu	Rosemère Curling Club, Rosemère; Glenmore Curling Club, Dollard-des-Ormeaux
Pierre Gervais	Guy Turner	Alain Maillette	Éric Lemaire		Club de curling Trois-Rivières, Trois-Rivières
Guy Hemmings	François Gagné	Ghyslain Richard	Christian Bouchard		Club de curling Longue-Pointe, Montreal
Philippe Lemay	Mathieu Beaufort	Jean-Michel Arsenault	Érik Lachance	Frédéric Boulanger	Club de curling Laviolette, Trois-Rivières
Nicolas Marceau	Jasmin Gibeau	Vincent Bourget	Michaël Fortin	Matthew Sigouin	Club de curling Laviolette, Trois-Rivières; Club de curling Trois-Rivières, Trois-Rivières
Jean-Michel Ménard	Martin Crête	Éric Sylvain	Philippe Ménard		Club de curling Etchemin, Saint-Romuald
Jean-François Royer	David Vallières	Raphaël Gendron	Jean-Olivier Hay		TMR Curling Club, Mont-Royal

== Round robin standings ==
Final Round Robin Standings

Key
Teams to Playoffs

Skip (Club)	W	L	PF	PA
Jean-Michel Ménard (Etchemin)	8	1	68	42
Robert Desjardins (Chicoutimi)	7	2	70	51
Philippe Lemay (Laviolette)	7	2	63	40
Steeve Gagnon (Rosemère/Glenmore)	6	3	76	45
Martin Ferland (Etchemin)	4	5	58	61
Guy Hemmings (Longue-Pointe)	4	5	63	51
Nicolas Marceau (Laviolette/Trois-Rivières)	3	6	51	72
William Dion (Celanese/Laurier)	2	7	46	76
Pierre Gervais (Trois-Rivières)	2	7	49	74
Jean-François Royer (TMR)	2	7	50	74

== Round robin results ==
All draw times are listed in Eastern Standard Time (UTC−5).

=== Draw 1 ===
Monday, January 21, 19:45

Sheet A	1	2	3	4	5	6	7	8	9	10	Final
Steeve Gagnon	4	0	0	0	0	1	1	1	1	X	8
Jean-Michel Ménard	0	2	0	0	1	0	0	0	0	X	3

Sheet B	1	2	3	4	5	6	7	8	9	10	Final
Nicolas Marceau	0	2	0	0	0	0	X	X	X	X	2
Guy Hemmings	3	0	1	0	4	1	X	X	X	X	9

Sheet C	1	2	3	4	5	6	7	8	9	10	Final
Martin Ferland	0	0	1	0	1	0	2	0	2	0	6
Jean-François Royer	1	0	0	2	0	1	0	1	0	2	7

Sheet D	1	2	3	4	5	6	7	8	9	10	Final
Philippe Lemay	2	0	1	1	0	3	0	X	X	X	7
William Dion	0	0	0	0	1	0	1	X	X	X	2

Sheet E	1	2	3	4	5	6	7	8	9	10	Final
Pierre Gervais	2	0	1	0	1	0	0	0	3	0	7
Robert Desjardins	0	2	0	2	0	1	0	0	0	4	9

=== Draw 2 ===
Tuesday, January 22, 8:15

Sheet A	1	2	3	4	5	6	7	8	9	10	Final
Robert Desjardins	2	0	2	0	4	2	X	X	X	X	10
Jean-François Royer	0	2	0	1	0	0	X	X	X	X	3

Sheet B	1	2	3	4	5	6	7	8	9	10	Final
Pierre Gervais	0	0	1	0	1	0	X	X	X	X	2
Jean-Michel Ménard	0	2	0	4	0	3	X	X	X	X	9

Sheet C	1	2	3	4	5	6	7	8	9	10	Final
Steeve Gagnon	0	0	3	0	2	3	X	X	X	X	8
William Dion	0	0	0	1	0	0	X	X	X	X	1

Sheet D	1	2	3	4	5	6	7	8	9	10	Final
Martin Ferland	2	0	0	1	2	0	0	0	0	0	5
Nicolas Marceau	0	0	2	0	0	0	2	2	0	1	7

Sheet E	1	2	3	4	5	6	7	8	9	10	11	Final
Philippe Lemay	0	2	0	0	0	2	0	0	1	0	1	6
Guy Hemmings	0	0	0	2	0	0	0	2	0	1	0	5

=== Draw 3 ===
Tuesday, January 22, 15:45

Sheet A	1	2	3	4	5	6	7	8	9	10	Final
Jean-Michel Ménard	4	0	1	0	3	0	1	0	2	X	11
William Dion	0	2	0	1	0	2	0	1	0	X	6

Sheet B	1	2	3	4	5	6	7	8	9	10	Final
Philippe Lemay	2	0	3	3	0	0	2	X	X	X	10
Nicolas Marceau	0	1	0	0	1	0	0	X	X	X	2

Sheet C	1	2	3	4	5	6	7	8	9	10	11	Final
Jean-François Royer	0	1	0	0	3	0	3	0	2	0	1	10
Steeve Gagnon	2	0	1	1	0	2	0	2	0	1	0	9

Sheet D	1	2	3	4	5	6	7	8	9	10	11	Final
Guy Hemmings	0	3	0	0	0	0	0	1	1	0	0	5
Robert Desjardins	2	0	0	0	1	0	0	0	0	2	1	6

Sheet E	1	2	3	4	5	6	7	8	9	10	Final
Martin Ferland	1	2	0	2	0	0	0	2	1	1	9
Pierre Gervais	0	0	2	0	1	2	2	0	0	0	7

=== Draw 4 ===
Wednesday, January 23, 8:15

Sheet A	1	2	3	4	5	6	7	8	9	10	Final
Martin Ferland	0	4	0	2	0	1	0	1	2	X	10
Guy Hemmings	2	0	1	0	1	0	2	0	0	X	6

Sheet B	1	2	3	4	5	6	7	8	9	10	Final
Robert Desjardins	0	2	0	0	2	0	0	X	X	X	4
Steeve Gagnon	4	0	1	1	0	2	2	X	X	X	10

Sheet C	1	2	3	4	5	6	7	8	9	10	Final
Nicolas Marceau	0	1	0	0	2	0	1	0	X	X	4
Jean-Michel Ménard	0	0	4	0	0	3	0	3	X	X	10

Sheet D	1	2	3	4	5	6	7	8	9	10	Final
William Dion	1	0	2	0	3	0	0	2	0	1	9
Pierre Gervais	0	1	0	2	0	1	0	0	2	0	6

Sheet E	1	2	3	4	5	6	7	8	9	10	Final
Jean-François Royer	1	0	0	0	0	0	1	0	1	1	4
Philippe Lemay	0	2	1	0	0	1	0	1	0	0	5

=== Draw 5 ===
Wednesday, January 23, 15:45

Sheet A	1	2	3	4	5	6	7	8	9	10	Final
Pierre Gervais	0	0	0	1	0	1	X	X	X	X	2
Philippe Lemay	3	1	1	0	2	0	X	X	X	X	7

Sheet B	1	2	3	4	5	6	7	8	9	10	11	Final
Jean-François Royer	0	3	0	2	0	0	3	1	0	1	0	10
William Dion	2	0	4	0	1	1	0	0	2	0	1	11

Sheet C	1	2	3	4	5	6	7	8	9	10	Final
Robert Desjardins	2	0	1	2	0	0	2	1	0	1	9
Nicolas Marceau	0	2	0	0	2	1	0	0	1	0	6

Sheet D	1	2	3	4	5	6	7	8	9	10	Final
Jean-Michel Ménard	2	0	1	2	0	1	0	3	X	X	9
Guy Hemmings	0	2	0	0	1	0	2	0	X	X	5

Sheet E	1	2	3	4	5	6	7	8	9	10	Final
Steeve Gagnon	1	0	1	0	0	2	0	0	1	0	5
Martin Ferland	0	1	0	2	0	0	1	1	0	1	6

=== Draw 6 ===
Thursday, January 24, 12:00

Sheet A	1	2	3	4	5	6	7	8	9	10	Final
Jean-François Royer	0	2	0	3	0	1	0	1	0	X	7
Nicolas Marceau	2	0	2	0	2	0	2	0	3	X	11

Sheet B	1	2	3	4	5	6	7	8	9	10	Final
Steeve Gagnon	0	3	1	0	0	3	1	0	1	X	9
Pierre Gervais	1	0	0	1	1	0	0	1	0	X	4

Sheet C	1	2	3	4	5	6	7	8	9	10	Final
Jean-Michel Ménard	0	0	0	2	1	0	2	0	0	1	6
Philippe Lemay	1	0	0	0	0	1	0	2	1	0	5

Sheet D	1	2	3	4	5	6	7	8	9	10	Final
Robert Desjardins	3	0	2	0	1	3	X	X	X	X	9
Martin Ferland	0	1	0	1	0	0	X	X	X	X	2

Sheet E	1	2	3	4	5	6	7	8	9	10	Final
Guy Hemmings	3	0	1	0	4	1	X	X	X	X	9
William Dion	0	1	0	1	0	0	X	X	X	X	2

=== Draw 7 ===
Thursday, January 24, 19:30

Sheet A	1	2	3	4	5	6	7	8	9	10	Final
William Dion	0	2	0	0	1	1	0	1	0	0	5
Robert Desjardins	2	0	2	1	0	0	0	0	1	4	10

Sheet B	1	2	3	4	5	6	7	8	9	10	11	Final
Martin Ferland	1	0	1	0	3	0	2	0	0	1	0	8
Philippe Lemay	0	2	0	2	0	1	0	2	1	0	1	9

Sheet C	1	2	3	4	5	6	7	8	9	10	Final
Pierre Gervais	1	0	1	0	1	0	2	0	1	X	6
Guy Hemmings	0	2	0	2	0	3	0	2	0	X	9

Sheet D	1	2	3	4	5	6	7	8	9	10	Final
Jean-François Royer	0	0	1	0	0	0	1	0	X	X	2
Jean-Michel Ménard	3	0	0	1	0	2	0	1	X	X	7

Sheet E	1	2	3	4	5	6	7	8	9	10	Final
Nicolas Marceau	0	0	0	1	0	0	1	0	1	X	3
Steeve Gagnon	1	0	0	0	2	2	0	2	0	X	7

=== Draw 8 ===
Friday, January 25, 10:30

Sheet A	1	2	3	4	5	6	7	8	9	10	Final
Nicolas Marceau	0	1	0	2	0	1	0	4	0	X	8
Pierre Gervais	3	0	2	0	2	0	2	0	1	X	10

Sheet B	1	2	3	4	5	6	7	8	9	10	Final
Guy Hemmings	4	0	1	0	0	3	X	X	X	X	8
Jean-François Royer	0	1	0	0	1	0	X	X	X	X	2

Sheet C	1	2	3	4	5	6	7	8	9	10	Final
William Dion	0	0	2	1	0	1	0	1	0	0	5
Martin Ferland	1	1	0	0	2	0	2	0	0	1	7

Sheet D	1	2	3	4	5	6	7	8	9	10	Final
Steeve Gagnon	0	1	0	1	0	0	1	0	0	0	3
Philippe Lemay	0	0	1	0	1	1	0	1	2	1	7

Sheet E	1	2	3	4	5	6	7	8	9	10	11	Final
Robert Desjardins	0	0	2	0	1	0	1	0	1	0	0	5
Jean-Michel Ménard	0	0	0	0	0	1	0	2	0	2	1	6

=== Draw 9 ===
Friday, January 25, 18:00

Sheet A	1	2	3	4	5	6	7	8	9	10	11	Final
Guy Hemmings	0	0	0	2	0	2	1	0	0	2	0	7
Steeve Gagnon	1	2	0	0	2	0	0	0	2	0	1	8

Sheet B	1	2	3	4	5	6	7	8	9	10	11	Final
Jean-Michel Ménard	0	2	0	0	2	0	1	0	0	0	1	6
Martin Ferland	1	0	0	2	0	1	0	0	0	1	0	5

Sheet C	1	2	3	4	5	6	7	8	9	10	Final
Philippe Lemay	0	1	1	0	1	0	2	0	2	0	7
Robert Desjardins	1	0	0	1	0	3	0	2	0	1	8

Sheet D	1	2	3	4	5	6	7	8	9	10	Final
Pierre Gervais	0	1	0	1	0	1	0	3	0	1	7
Jean-François Royer	0	0	1	0	1	0	1	0	2	0	5

Sheet E	1	2	3	4	5	6	7	8	9	10	Final
William Dion	0	1	0	1	0	2	1	0	0	X	5
Nicolas Marceau	2	0	2	0	3	0	0	1	0	X	8

== Playoffs ==
Page playoff system
1	Jean-Michel Ménard	7
2	Robert Desjardins	3
3	Philippe Lemay	8
4	Steeve Gagnon	7

Semifinal
2	Robert Desjardins	6
3	Philippe Lemay	7

Final
1	Jean-Michel Ménard	6
3	Philippe Lemay	5

=== 1 vs. 2 ===
Saturday, January 26, 14:00

Sheet B	1	2	3	4	5	6	7	8	9	10	Final
Jean-Michel Ménard	2	0	2	1	0	2	0	X	X	X	7
Robert Desjardins	0	1	0	0	1	0	1	X	X	X	3

=== 3 vs. 4 ===
Saturday, January 26, 19:00

Sheet B	1	2	3	4	5	6	7	8	9	10	Final
Philippe Lemay	1	0	0	0	2	0	2	0	2	1	8
Steeve Gagnon	0	0	1	1	0	2	0	3	0	0	7

=== Semifinal ===
Sunday, January 27, 09:00

Sheet B	1	2	3	4	5	6	7	8	9	10	Final
Philippe Lemay	0	1	0	3	0	2	0	0	0	1	7
Robert Desjardins	0	0	1	0	1	0	2	1	1	0	6

=== Final ===
Sunday, January 27, 14:00

Sheet B	1	2	3	4	5	6	7	8	9	10	Final
Jean-Michel Ménard	2	0	2	0	0	0	0	1	0	1	6
Philippe Lemay	0	1	0	1	0	1	0	0	2	0	5
