= 2017 WFG Tankard =

- Host city: Lévis, Quebec
- Arena: Aréna de Lévis
- Dates: January 8–15, 2016
- Winner: Jean-Michel Ménard
- Curling club: CC Etchemin, Saint-Romuald
- Skip: Jean-Michel Ménard
- Third: Martin Crête
- Second: Éric Sylvain
- Lead: Philippe Ménard
- Finalist: Martin Ferland

The 2017 WFG Tankard, the Quebec men's provincial curling championship was held from January 8 to 15 at the Aréna de Lévis in Lévis, Quebec. The winning Jean-Michel Ménard team represented Quebec at the 2017 Tim Hortons Brier in St. John's, Newfoundland and Labrador. The event was held in conjunction with the 2017 Quebec Scotties Tournament of Hearts.

== Teams ==
Teams are as follows

Skip	Third	Second	Lead	Alternate	Club(s)
Jean-Michel Arsenault	Mathieu Beaufort (skip)	Erik Lachance	Maxime H. Benoit		Aurèle-Racine
Simon Benoit	Jean-François Trépanier	Martin Trépanier	Pier-Luc Trépanier		Valleyfield / Aurèle-Racine
Dale Ness	Shane McRae	Shawn Blair (skip)	Scott McClintock	Taylor Lamb	Ormstown
Marc-André Chartrand	Pierre Blanchard	Maxime Mailloux	Jonathan Martel	Gabriel Saindon	Noranda / La Sarre
Mathieu Drapeau	Yanick Lefebvre	Hugo Chapdelaine	David Bergeron		Drummondville
Martin Ferland	François Roberge	Maxime Elmaleh	Jean Gagnon		Laviolette / Etchemin
Mike Fournier	Félix Asselin	William Dion	Miguel Bernard		Glenmore
Fred Lawton	Derek Lockwood	Matt Greene	Charles Gagnon		Baie d'Urfé
Yannick Martel	François Gionest	Jean-François Charest	Alexandre Ferland		Kénogami / Riverbend
Jean-Michel Ménard	Martin Crête	Eric Sylvain	Philippe Ménard		Etchemin
Pierre-Luc Morissette	Robert Desjardins	Thierry Fournier	René Dubois		Chicoutimi / Victoria
Steven Munroe	François Gagné	Philippe Brassard	Christian Bouchard		Etchemin/ Portneuf / TMR
Jean-Sébastien Roy	Jasmin Gibeau	Dan deWaard	Vincent Bourget		Thurso / Buckingham / Trois-Rivières
Matt Kennerknecht	Ben Vezeau (skip)	Cameron Maclean	Jon Spring	Denis Robichaud	Glenmore

== Round-robin standings ==
Key
Teams to Championship Round
Teams to Tiebreaker

Pool A	W	L
Roy	5	1
Morissette	4	2
Ménard	3	3
Martel	3	3
Benoit	3	3
Blair	2	4
Lawton	1	5

Pool B	W	L
Ferland	6	0
Munroe	5	1
Beaufort	3	3
Fournier	3	3
Chartrand	2	4
Drapeau	1	5
Vezeau	1	5

== Scores ==
Draw 1

- Roy 11-5 Blair
- Morissette 9-4 Lawton
- Benoit 8-4 Martel
- Ferland 9-2 Beaufort
- Fournier 9-6 Vezeau

Draw 2

- Munroe 6-3 Chartrand
- Beaufort 7-5 Vezeau
- Ferland 8-2 Drapeau
- Martel 8-6 Ménard
- Benoit 10-5 Lawton

Draw 3

- Morissette 7-3 Blair

Draw 4

- Fournier 11-3 Drapeau
- Roy 7-4 Martel
- Munroe 9-4 Vezeau
- Ménard 9-3 Lawton
- Ferland 8-4 Chartrand

Draw 5

- Morissette 6-3 Martel
- Ménard 6-5 Blair
- Roy 8-7 Benoit

Draw 6

- Vezeau 6-4 Chartrand
- Munroe 7-5 Fournier
- Beaufort 9-1 Drapeau

Draw 7

- Ménard 7-0 Benoit
- Roy 5-4 Morissette
- Martel 9-3 Lawton

Draw 8

- Ferland 8-1 Vezeau
- Fournier 8-3 Chartrand
- Munroe 7-5 Beaufort

Draw 9

- Beaufort 6-5 Fournier
- Ferland 9-5 Munroe
- Drapeau 6-3 Vezeau

Draw 10

- Benoit 8-7 Morissette
- Martel 9-7 Blair
- Roy 7-6 Ménard

Draw 11

- Ferland 10-5 Fournier
- Chartrand 9-5 Beaufort
- Munroe 6-3 Drapeau

Draw 12

- Lawton 7-4 Roy
- Morissette 7-5 Ménard
- Blair 6-5 Benoit

Draw 13

- Chartrand 4-3 Drapeau
- Blair 8-6 Lawton

Tiebreakers

- Ménard 8-5 Martel
- Beaufort 3-2 Fournier

== Championship round ==
Key
Teams to Playoffs

Skip	W	L
Morissette	7	2
Ferland	7	2
Roy	7	2
Ménard	6	3
Munroe	5	4
Beaufort	3	6

=== Scores ===
Draw 14

- Ménard 6-5 Ferland
- Roy 9-5 Beaufort
- Morissette 9-4 Munroe

Draw 15

- Roy 8-3 Munroe
- Morissette 8-4 Ferland
- Ménard 8-3 Beaufort

Draw 16

- Morissette 5-3 Beaufort
- Ménard 9-2 Munroe
- Ferland 7-6 Roy

== Playoffs ==
Page playoff system
1	Pierre-Luc Morissette	6
2	Martin Ferland	10
3	Jean-Sébastien Roy	2
4	Jean-Michel Ménard	7

Semifinal
1	Pierre-Luc Morissette	3
4	Jean-Michel Ménard	7

Final
2	Martin Ferland	6
4	Jean-Michel Menard	9

=== 1 vs 2 ===
Saturday, January 15, 7:30 pm

Sheet B	1	2	3	4	5	6	7	8	9	10	Final
Martin Ferland	0	2	0	2	0	2	0	2	0	2	10
Pierre-Luc Morissette	0	0	1	0	3	0	2	0	0	0	6

=== 3 vs 4 ===
Saturday, January 15, 7:30 pm

Sheet D	1	2	3	4	5	6	7	8	9	10	Final
Jean-Sébastien Roy	1	0	0	0	0	1	X	X	X	X	2
Jean-Michel Ménard	0	2	2	2	1	0	X	X	X	X	7

=== Semifinal ===
Sunday, January 16, 8:15 am

Sheet C	1	2	3	4	5	6	7	8	9	10	Final
Jean-Michel Ménard	0	0	2	1	0	2	0	0	2	X	7
Pierre-Luc Morissette	1	0	0	0	1	0	0	1	0	X	3

=== Final ===
Sunday, January 16, 3:45 pm

Sheet C	1	2	3	4	5	6	7	8	9	10	Final
Martin Ferland	1	0	2	0	2	0	0	0	1	0	6
Jean-Michel Menard	0	2	0	1	0	2	1	2	0	1	9

2017 WFG Tankard

Jean-Michel Ménard
11th Quebec Provincial Championship title
