= Quebec Tankard =

- Established: 1927
- 2026 host city: Rimouski, Quebec
- 2026 arena: Complexe Sportif Desjardins
- 2026 champion: Jean-Michel Ménard

Current edition
- 2026 Quebec Tankard

The Quebec Tankard (French: Tankard Québec), formerly the Quebec Men's Provincial Curling Championship is the Quebec provincial championship for men's curling. The tournament is run by Curling Québec, the provincial curling association. The winner represents Team Quebec at the Montana's Brier. The provincial champion receives the McIntyre Trophy.

A separate team represented Montreal until 1931.

== Qualifying ==
16 teams play in the Quebec provincial. The teams that qualify are the defending champions, the provincial tour champion, the three highest Quebec teams on the Canadian Team Ranking System, the three highest earning teams on the Quebec tour, six regional qualifiers and two last chance qualifiers.

== Winners ==
Year	Skip	Winning Club(s)
2026	Jean-Michel Ménard	Glenmore, Des Collines, Etchemin, Belvédère & Valleyfield
2025	Jean-Michel Ménard	Glenmore, Des Collines, Etchemin & Valleyfield
2024	Jean-Michel Arsenault	Etchemin, Chicoutimi & Kénogami
2023	Félix Asselin	Glenmore, Belvédère, Valleyfield & Etchemin
2022	Cancelled due to the COVID-19 pandemic in Quebec. Team Mike Fournier invited to represent Quebec at Brier	
2021	Cancelled due to the COVID-19 pandemic in Quebec. Team Mike Fournier invited to represent Quebec at Brier	
2020	Alek Bédard	Boucherville & Glenmore
2019	Martin Crête	Etchemin, Grand-Mère & Mt. Bruno
2018	Mike Fournier	Glenmore & Valleyfield
2017	Jean-Michel Ménard	Etchemin
2016	Jean-Michel Ménard	Etchemin & Mt. Bruno
2015	Jean-Michel Ménard	Etchemin
2014	Jean-Michel Ménard	Etchemin
2013	Jean-Michel Ménard	Etchemin
2012	Robert Desjardins	Chicoutimi
2011	François Gagné	Chicoutimi & TMR
2010	Serge Reid	Kénogami
2009	Jean-Michel Ménard	Victoria & Etchemin
2008	Jean-Michel Ménard	Victoria & Etchemin
2007	Pierre Charette	Cap-de-la-Madeleine
2006	Jean-Michel Ménard	Victoria & Etchemin
2005	Jean-Michel Ménard	Victoria & Etchemin
2004	Daniel Lafleur	Rosemère
2003	Guy Hemmings	St. Lambert
2002	François Roberge	Victoria
2001	Guy Hemmings	St. Lambert
2000	François Roberge	Victoria
1999	Guy Hemmings	St. Lambert & Tracy
1998	Guy Hemmings	St. Lambert & Tracy
1997	Don Westphal	Buckingham
1996	Don Westphal	Buckingham
1995	Steve Gagnon	Kénogami
1994	Ghislain Doyon	Amos
1993	Pierre Charette	Buckingham
1992	Ted Butler	Buckingham
1991	Kevin Adams	Glenmore
1990	Kevin Adams	Glenmore
1989	Pierre Charette	Buckingham
1988	Lawren Stevenson	Lachine
1987	Kevin Adams	Thistle
1986	Gordon Hess	Glenmore
1985	Don Aitken	Lachine
1984	Rolland Pacquin	Lachine
1983	Denis Marchand	Laviolette
1982	Don Aitken	CFB St. Jean
1981	Brian Ness	Howick
1980	Jim Ursel	St. Laurent
1979	Jim Ursel	St. Laurent
1978	Steve Ducat	Caledonia
1977	Jim Ursel	St. Laurent
1976	Jim Ursel	St. Laurent
1975	Jim Ursel	St. Laurent
1974	Jim Ursel	St. Laurent
1973	Dave Moon	Caledonia
1972	Bill Kent	Heather
1971	Bill Ott	Outremont
1970	Bill Kent	Heather
1969	Earl Carson	CFB Bagotville
1968	Bill Tracy	CFB Bagotville
1967	Bruce Beveridge	Glenmore
1966	Bill Tracy	RCAF Bagotville
1965	Bill Tracy	RCAF Bagotville
1964	Elmer Black	Howick
1963	Bill Kent	Heather
1962	Bill Armstrong	Lachine
1961	Tom Welch	Whitlock
1960	Ted Hunt	Lachine
1959	Jack Bergman	Outremont
1958	Bob Lahaie	Cap-de-la-Madeleine
1957	Ken Weldon	Caledonia
1956	Walter Smith	Thetford Mines
1955	Olivier Samson	Jacques-Cartier
1954	Bill Tracy	Arvida
1953	Ken Weldon	St. George
1952	Ken Weldon	St. George
1951	Merle Thomas	Sigma
1950	Herbert Simons	Victoria
1949	Roderique Cote	Matane
1948	Gus Amyot	Jacques-Cartier
1947	Robert Cream	Victoria
1946	Ted Thompson	St. George
1945	Robert Cream	Victoria
1944	Billy McGerrigle	Victoria
1943	Robert Cream	Victoria
1942	John Ross, Jr.	Huntingdon
1941	Charles Handley	Quebec
1940	Archie Bell	Victoria
1939	Robert Cream	Quebec
1938	Robert Cream	Quebec
1937	Ormiston Roy	Caledonia
1936	C. B. Bignell	Victoria
1935	Billy McGerrigle	Ormstown
1934	A. H. M. May	Victoria
1933	Ren Fortier	Thistle
1932	Peter Lyall	Caledonia
1931	Peter Lyall	Caledonia
1930	John Darby	Huntingdon
1929	Archie Bell	Victoria
1928	S. G. Newton	Victoria
1927	Mjr. Robert Whyte	Quebec
