= Shot of the Week Award =

The Shot of the Week Award is an award given to the curler with the most outstanding shot at one of two events:

- Scotties Tournament of Hearts Shot of the Week Award
- Tim Hortons Brier Shot of the Week Award
