= Robert Desjardins (curler) =

Canadian curler (born 1970)

- Curler
- Born: March 16, 1970 (age 56); Montreal, Quebec

Team
- Curling club: CC Chicoutimi, Chicoutimi, QC
- Skip: Mike Kennedy
- Third: Robert Desjardins
- Second: René Dubois
- Lead: Stewart Yaxley
- Mixed doubles partner: Anne Sophie Gionest

Curling career
- Member Association: Quebec
- Brier: 2 (2011, 2012)
- World Mixed Doubles Championship: 1 (2013)
- Top CTRS ranking: 18th (2006-07)
Medal record
Curling
Representing Quebec
Canadian Mixed Doubles Trials
Gold medal – first place	2013 Leduc

Robert Desjardins (born March 16, 1970) is a Canadian curler from Chicoutimi, Quebec. He currently plays third on Team Mike Kennedy. He is a two-time Quebec provincial champion and a Canadian mixed doubles champion.

== Career ==
Desjardins skipped a team at the 2010 Quebec provincials, but finished outside of the playoffs. The next year, Desjardins played as third for François Gagné, and finished fourth in the 2011 Quebec provincials after round robin play. They then upset the top two teams, skipped by Serge Reid and Jean-Michel Ménard, to win their first provincial championship and Brier appearance. They finished in tenth place at the Brier with a 3–8 win–loss record. Desjardins then skipped his own team in the following year's provincials, and edged an undefeated Philippe Lemay in the final in an extra end after losing to him in the page playoffs, winning his first provincial championship as skip. Representing Quebec at the 2012 Tim Hortons Brier, Desjardins and team finished in ninth place with a 4–7 win–loss record. Desjardins returned to defend his provincial title the next year, but lost in the page playoffs to Ménard and in the semifinal to Lemay.

In mixed doubles, Desjardins teamed up with Isabelle Néron to play in the inaugural Canadian Mixed Doubles Curling Trials. Finishing third in pool play, Desjardins and Néron flew through the playoffs, edging three teams, including former Canadian mixed curling champions Mark Dacey and Heather Smith-Dacey, to claim the championship. Desjardin and Néron struggled at the worlds, however, and finished in fifth place in their group with a 4–4 win–loss record.

== Personal life ==
Desjardins works as a grade 9 math teacher with the Commission scolaire des Rives-du-Saguenay. He is in a relationship with Veronique Bouchard and has three children.

== Teams ==
Season	Skip	Third	Second	Lead	Events
2009–10	Robert Desjardins	Philippe Brassard	Yannick Martel	Frédéric Boulanger	2010 Que.
2010–11	François Gagné	Robert Desjardins	Christian Bouchard	Philippe Ménard	2011 Que., Brier
2011–12	Robert Desjardins	Jean-Sébastien Roy	Steven Munroe	Steeve Villeneuve	2012 Que., Brier
2012–13	Robert Desjardins	Jean-Sébastien Roy	Steven Munroe	Steeve Villeneuve	2013 Que.
2013–14	Robert Desjardins	Frederic Lawton	Miguel Bernard	Martin Lavoie	2014 Que.
2014–15	Robert Desjardins	Louis Biron	Frederic Lawton	Maurice Cayouette	2015 Que.
2015–16	Robert Desjardins (Fourth)	Pierre-Luc Morissette (Skip)	Thierry Fournier	René Dubois	2016 Que.
2016–17	Robert Desjardins (Fourth)	Pierre-Luc Morissette (Skip)	Thierry Fournier	René Dubois	2017 Que.
2017–18	Robert Desjardins (Fourth)	Jean-Sébastien Roy (Skip)	Pierre-Luc Morissette	Thierry Fournier	2018 Que.
2018–19	Jean-Sébastien Roy	Robert Desjardins	Pierre-Luc Morissette	René Dubois	2019 Que.
2019–20	Robert Desjardins (Fourth)	Jean-Sébastien Roy (Skip)	Pierre-Luc Morissette	René Dubois	2020 Que.
2020–21	Robert Desjardins	François Gionest	Pierre-Luc Morissette	Marc-Alexandre Dion	
2021–22	Robert Desjardins	François Gionest	Pierre-Luc Morissette	Marc-Alexandre Dion	
2022–23	Robert Desjardins	François Gionest	Pierre-Luc Morissette	René Dubois	2023 Que.
2023–24	Robert Desjardins	François Gionest	Pierre-Luc Morissette	René Dubois	2024 Que.
2024–25	Robert Desjardins	Yannick Martel	Jean-François Charest	Bradley Lequin	2025 Que.
2025–26	Mike Kennedy	François Gionest	Robert Desjardins	René Dubois	2026 Que.
2026–27	Mike Kennedy	Robert Desjardins	René Dubois	Stewart Yaxley	
