= Tim Hortons Brier Shot of the Week Award =

Canadian curling prize

Shot of the Week Award
- Sport: Curling
- Competition: Tim Hortons Brier
- Awarded for: The most outstanding shot during the Tim Hortons Brier.

History
- First award: 1997
- First winner: (Alberta) Kevin Martin
- Most wins: (Ontario) Glenn Howard (3)
- Most recent: (Newfoundland and Labrador) Brad Gushue

The Shot of the Week Award at the annual Tim Hortons Brier is presented to the individual curler who executes the most outstanding shot during the tournament. The award has been presented since 1997. The inaugural winner was Kevin Martin of Alberta. The current holder of the award is Brad Gushue.

From 1997 to 2009 the award was selected by the Brier's statisticians. From 2010 to 2013, the award was selected by TSN. It has not been presented since.

== Winners ==
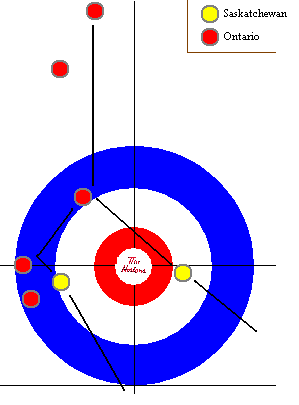
Glenn Howard's last shot in a round robin game against Saskatchewan at the 2009 Brier is considered to be one of the best curling shots ever. It won him the Shot of the Week Award that year.

Year	Winner	Team
1997	Kevin Martin	Alberta
1998	Guy Hemmings	Quebec
1999	Guy Hemmings	Quebec
2000	Peter Corner	Ontario
2001	Kerry Burtnyk	Manitoba
2002	David Nedohin	Alberta
2003	Bruce Lohnes	Nova Scotia
2004	Jay Peachey	British Columbia
2005	David Nedohin	Alberta
2006	Mark Dacey	Nova Scotia
2007	Dean Joanisse	British Columbia
2008	Glenn Howard	Ontario
2009	Glenn Howard	Ontario
2010	Richard Hart	Ontario
2011	Jeff Stoughton	Manitoba
2012	Glenn Howard	Ontario
2013	Brad Gushue	Newfoundland and Labrador
