= Jean-Michel Arsenault =

Canadian curler (born 1988)

- Curler
- Born: October 28, 1988 (age 38); Quebec City, Quebec

Team
- Curling club: CC Etchemin, Saint-Romuald, QC
- Skip: Félix Asselin
- Third: Julien Tremblay
- Second: Jesse Mullen
- Lead: Jean-Michel Arsenault

Curling career
- Member Association: Quebec
- Brier: 1 (2024)
- Top CTRS ranking: 26th (2023–24)
Medal record
Men's curling
Representing Canada
World Junior Championships
Bronze medal – third place	2008 Östersund

Jean-Michel Arsenault (born October 28, 1988) is a Canadian curler from Lévis, Quebec. He currently plays lead on Team Félix Asselin.

== Career ==
=== Juniors ===
Arsenault joined the William Dion junior team for the 2007–08 season, playing third for the team. The team was formed by a merger of two junior rinks, with Dion having won the Quebec juniors in 2007. At the time, Arsenault was living in Rimouski where he was attending Cégep de Rimouski. The team won the Quebec juniors, and represented the province at the 2008 Canadian Junior Curling Championships. There, the Dion-led rink finished atop the table with a 10–2 round robin record. This put them in the final, where they beat Ontario's Travis Fanset, winning the Canadian Juniors for Quebec. It was only the third time Quebec won the men's Canadian Juniors. At the juniors, Arsenault was named to the event's first all-star team. The team represented Canada at the 2008 World Junior Curling Championships, the first team from Quebec to do so since 1992. At the World Juniors, the team finished tied for first following the round robin, with a 7–2 record. In the playoffs, the team lost the 1 vs. 2 game, and the semifinal, but rebounded to win the bronze medal game against Norway. At the end of the year, the rink was named Quebec's "team of the year" at the Sports Quebec Gala.

The following season, Arsenault skipped his own team, but lost in the final of the Quebec juniors to Andrew Leigh.

=== Men's ===
After juniors, Arsenault played for a number of different skips in Quebec. In his first year out of juniors, he played second for Steven Munroe at the 2010 Quebec Men's Provincial Curling Championship. The team finished the event with a 2–7 record in pool play. The following year, he played third for Guy Hemmings at the 2011 Quebec Men's Provincial Curling Championship. There, the team finished 6–3, and lost in a tiebreaker match. The next year, he played second for Philippe Lemay at the 2012 Quebec Men's Provincial Curling Championship, making it as far as the final, where they lost to Robert Desjardins. The team made it to the finals of the 2013 and 2014 Quebec Men's Provincial Curling Championship as well, but lost in the final to Jean-Michel Ménard in both years.

Arsenault joined the Mathieu Beaufort rink in 2015 as his third. The team played at the 2016 Quebec championship, where they went 2–4 in pool play. The team played in the 2017 men's championship as well, with Arsenault throwing fourth stones on the team. There the team made it to the championship round, but finished 3–6 overall. In 2017, he joined the François Gagné rink at third. The team played in the 2018 Quebec championship, going 3–3. The team finished 3–3 at the 2019 provincial championship as well, but played in a tiebreaker, which they lost to Mark Homan.

In 2019, Arsenault joined Team Vincent Roberge, who were all in their early 20s, to give the rink experience. On tour, the team won the Classique de curling de Ville de Lévis, the Dave Jones Mayflower Cashspiel and the Vic Open. The team played in the 2020 Quebec Tankard provincial championship, making it to the final where they lost in the final to Alek Bédard. The next season, the team qualified for the 2021 Canadian Olympic Curling Pre-Trials in an attempt to qualify for the 2022 Winter Olympics. There, the team finished with a 2–4 record.

Due to the COVID-19 pandemic in Quebec, there were no Quebec Tankards until 2023. The team played in the 2023 Quebec Tankard, making it all they to the final, where they lost to Félix Asselin. The next season, Roberge left the team, and the rink shuffled their order. The team won the Challenge de Curling Desjardins for the first time, with Arsenault skipping the team. The team also won the Superstore Monctonian Challenge on tour. The team accumulated enough CTRS points to qualify for the 2024 Quebec Tankard. There, their team finally won a provincial championship, qualifying the rink to represent Quebec at the 2024 Montana's Brier, where Arsenault would make his debut. At the Brier, the team was skipped by Julien Tremblay.

== Personal life ==
Arsenault is married and works as an automotive technician. In addition to attending Cégep de Rimouski, he also attended Cégep Limoilou.
