= Michel Briand =

French sailor (1930–2022)

Michel Briand (26 September 1930 – 31 August 2022) was a French sailor who competed in the 1968 Summer Olympics.
