= 2012 Tim Hortons Brier =

Canadian men's curling championship, 2012

- Host city: Saskatoon, Saskatchewan
- Arena: Credit Union Centre
- Dates: March 3–11
- Attendance: 177,226
- Winner: Ontario
- Curling club: Coldwater & District CC, Coldwater, Ontario
- Skip: Glenn Howard
- Third: Wayne Middaugh
- Second: Brent Laing
- Lead: Craig Savill
- Alternate: Scott Howard
- Coach: Scott Taylor
- Finalist: Alberta (Kevin Koe)

The 2012 Tim Hortons Brier, the Canadian men's national curling championship, was held from March 3 to March 11 at the Credit Union Centre in Saskatoon, Saskatchewan. This Brier marked the sixth time that Saskatoon hosted the Brier; the last time that the Brier was hosted in Saskatoon was in 2004. The winner of the Brier, Glenn Howard, represented Canada at the 2012 Capital One World Men's Curling Championship in Basel, Switzerland.

In the final, Ontario's Glenn Howard defeated Kevin Koe in ten ends with a score of 7–6. Howard won his fourth Brier title overall and his second Brier title as skip. Ontario third Wayne Middaugh became the first person in Brier history to win at three different positions, as second in 1993, as skip in 1998, and as third in 2012. Middaugh also set a record for best performance by a third in the final (with 98%), and won the Hec Gervais Award, which was awarded to the most valuable player in the playoffs.

This edition of the Brier saw the first Northwest Territories/Yukon team advancing to the page playoffs in Brier history since the induction of the playoffs format in 1980. Previously, the best performance from the Territories came in 1975, when Yukon's Don Twa and his team tied for second place after the round robin. In 1985, the Territories made it to a tiebreaker before being knocked out. The Brier also saw Ontario skip Glenn Howard breaking the record for most career games played at the Brier, which was previously set by his brother Russ Howard at 174 career games, after defeating Saskatchewan in Draw 10.

== Teams ==
At this year's Brier, Alberta was represented by former Brier champion and former world champion Kevin Koe, who defeated Brock Virtue in the provincial final. He made his second appearance at the Brier with a new third, Pat Simmons, who had skipped for Saskatchewan in five previous Briers. Brad Gushue of Newfoundland and Labrador clinched a sixth straight berth to the Brier after defeating former provincial champion Ken Peddigrew in the provincial final. Gushue made his ninth appearance at the Brier with a new team formed at the close of the last season. Northern Ontario was represented by Brad Jacobs, who played at his third consecutive Brier after defeating former provincial champion Mike Jakubo in the provincial final. Glenn Howard of Ontario made his seventh consecutive and fourteenth overall appearance at the Brier after winning the provincial final over Peter Corner. Rob Fowler of Manitoba made his first appearance at the Brier after defeating Mike McEwen in the provincial final. Kevin Martin and Jeff Stoughton, two recent Brier champions who together won three of the past four Briers, were both eliminated before the finals of their respective provincial championships.

British Columbia was represented by Jim Cotter after Cotter, who played at his third Brier, won his second straight provincial championship over Brent Pierce. Terry Odishaw made his first appearance at the Brier since 1998 after winning the New Brunswick final over defending provincial champion James Grattan. Jamie Murphy represented Nova Scotia at his first Brier, after defeating former Brier champion Mark Dacey in the final of the provincials. Prince Edward Island was represented by Mike Gaudet, who made his fourth Brier appearance, his first as skip since 2004, as he was the third for last year's Prince Edward Island skip Eddie MacKenzie. Robert Desjardins represented Quebec at his second consecutive Brier, his first Brier as skip, after defeating Phillipe Lemay in the provincial final. Saskatchewan was represented by Scott Manners, his first appearance at the Brier after upsetting Bruce Korte in the provincial final. Jamie Koe made his fourth consecutive and sixth overall appearance representing the Northwest Territories and Yukon after finishing the provincials with an undefeated record.

Alberta	British Columbia	Manitoba	New Brunswick
The Glencoe Club, Calgary Skip: Kevin Koe; Third: Pat Simmons; Second: Carter Rycroft; Lead: Nolan Thiessen; Alternate: Blake MacDonald	Kelowna CC, Kelowna Skip: Jim Cotter; Third: Kevin Folk; Second: Tyrel Griffith; Lead: Rick Sawatsky; Alternate: Ken Maskiewich	Brandon CC, Brandon Skip: Rob Fowler; Third: Allan Lyburn; Second: Richard Daneault; Lead: Derek Samagalski; Alternate: William Lyburn	Curl Moncton, Moncton Skip: Terry Odishaw; Third: Andy McCann; Second: Scott Jones; Lead: Grant Odishaw; Alternate: Roger Nason
Newfoundland and Labrador	Northern Ontario	Nova Scotia	Ontario
Bally Haly G&CC, St. John's Skip: Brad Gushue; Third: Ryan Fry; Second: Adam Casey; Lead: Geoff Walker; Alternate: Toby McDonald Jr.	Soo CA, Sault Ste. Marie Skip: Brad Jacobs; Third: E.J. Harnden; Second: Ryan Harnden; Lead: Scott Seabrook; Alternate: Joe Scharf	CFB Halifax CC, Halifax Skip: Jamie Murphy; Third: Jordan Pinder; Second: Mike Bardsley; Lead: Donald McDermaid; Alternate: Kyle Schmeisser	Coldwater District & CC, Coldwater Skip: Glenn Howard; Third: Wayne Middaugh; Second: Brent Laing; Lead: Craig Savill; Alternate: Scott Howard (Note: Alternate Scott Howard replaced Savill, who was ill, in draws 5 and 6.)
Prince Edward Island	Quebec	Saskatchewan	Northwest Territories/Yukon
Charlottetown CC, Charlottetown Skip: Mike Gaudet; Third: Tyler MacKenzie; Second: Tyler Harris; Lead: Sean Clarey; Alternate: Andrew Robinson	C de C Chicoutimi, Chicoutimi Skip: Robert Desjardins; Third: Jean-Sébastien Roy; Second: Steven Munroe; Lead: Steeve Villeneuve; Alternate: Jean-François Charest	Battleford CC, Battleford Skip: Scott Manners; Third: Tyler Lang; Second: Ryan Deis; Lead: Mike Armstrong; Alternate: Carl deConinck Smith	Yellowknife CC, Yellowknife Skip: Jamie Koe; Third: Tom Naugler; Second: Brad Chorostkowski; Lead: Robert Borden; Alternate: Greg Skauge

== Map of teams ==
Provincial Winners

== Round-robin standings ==
Final round-robin standings

Key
Teams to Playoffs

Locale	Skip	W	L	PF	PA	EW	EL	BE	SE	S%
Ontario	Glenn Howard	10	1	80	57	51	44	6	10	87%
Manitoba	Rob Fowler	8	3	84	61	49	41	10	9	85%
Alberta	Kevin Koe	8	3	82	45	48	35	11	15	86%
Northwest Territories/Yukon	Jamie Koe	7	4	81	77	49	41	4	9	81%
New Brunswick	Terry Odishaw	5	6	67	72	45	47	10	12	80%
Northern Ontario	Brad Jacobs	5	6	68	71	50	46	9	12	82%
Newfoundland and Labrador	Brad Gushue	5	6	74	70	49	49	7	11	82%
British Columbia	Jim Cotter	4	7	58	69	43	49	15	10	82%
Quebec	Robert Desjardins	4	7	63	76	48	50	10	9	79%
Nova Scotia	Jamie Murphy	4	7	68	81	60	49	11	6	81%
Saskatchewan	Scott Manners	3	8	63	82	42	47	11	8	83%
Prince Edward Island	Mike Gaudet	3	8	62	89	35	41	14	5	78%

== Round-robin results ==
All times listed in Central Standard Time (UTC-06).

=== Draw 1 ===
Saturday, March 3, 1:30 PM

Sheet A	1	2	3	4	5	6	7	8	9	10	11	Final
Quebec (Desjardins)	0	0	1	1	0	1	1	0	2	0	1	7
Manitoba (Fowler) 🔨	0	1	0	0	2	0	0	1	0	2	0	6

Sheet B	1	2	3	4	5	6	7	8	9	10	Final
Prince Edward Island (Gaudet)	0	0	0	1	0	1	0	2	0	X	4
Saskatchewan (Manners) 🔨	0	0	3	0	3	0	1	0	1	X	8

Sheet C	1	2	3	4	5	6	7	8	9	10	Final
Ontario (Howard)	2	1	0	1	0	1	0	0	0	1	6
New Brunswick (Odishaw) 🔨	0	0	1	0	1	0	2	0	1	0	5

Sheet D	1	2	3	4	5	6	7	8	9	10	Final
Nova Scotia (Murphy)	0	1	0	5	0	3	0	0	X	X	9
Northwest Territories/Yukon (J. Koe) 🔨	0	0	1	0	2	0	1	1	X	X	5

=== Draw 2 ===
Saturday, March 3, 6:30 PM

Sheet A	1	2	3	4	5	6	7	8	9	10	Final
Nova Scotia (Murphy) 🔨	4	0	2	0	0	3	0	1	X	X	10
Prince Edward Island (Gaudet)	0	1	0	1	1	0	1	0	X	X	4

Sheet B	1	2	3	4	5	6	7	8	9	10	Final
British Columbia (Cotter)	0	0	3	0	0	1	1	0	0	X	5
Alberta (K. Koe) 🔨	3	1	0	0	2	0	0	2	1	X	9

Sheet C	1	2	3	4	5	6	7	8	9	10	11	Final
Newfoundland and Labrador (Gushue)	0	2	0	1	1	0	1	0	0	1	0	6
Northern Ontario (Jacobs) 🔨	1	0	3	0	0	0	0	1	1	0	1	7

Sheet D	1	2	3	4	5	6	7	8	9	10	Final
New Brunswick (Odishaw)	1	0	0	1	0	1	0	2	0	X	5
Manitoba (Fowler) 🔨	0	0	2	0	1	0	1	0	2	X	6

=== Draw 3 ===
Sunday, March 4, 8:30 AM

Sheet A	1	2	3	4	5	6	7	8	9	10	Final
Alberta (K. Koe) 🔨	0	1	1	1	0	1	0	2	3	X	9
New Brunswick (Odishaw)	1	0	0	0	2	0	1	0	0	X	4

Sheet B	1	2	3	4	5	6	7	8	9	10	Final
Manitoba (Fowler)	0	3	0	0	1	0	2	0	0	2	8
Newfoundland and Labrador (Gushue) 🔨	1	0	2	1	0	1	0	1	1	0	7

Sheet C	1	2	3	4	5	6	7	8	9	10	Final
British Columbia (Cotter)	0	1	0	1	0	0	0	0	0	1	3
Nova Scotia (Murphy) 🔨	2	0	2	0	1	0	0	0	0	0	5

Sheet D	1	2	3	4	5	6	7	8	9	10	11	Final
Northern Ontario (Jacobs)	0	1	1	0	0	2	2	0	1	0	1	8
Prince Edward Island (Gaudet) 🔨	3	0	0	1	0	0	0	2	0	1	0	7

=== Draw 4 ===
Sunday, March 4, 1:30 PM

Sheet A	1	2	3	4	5	6	7	8	9	10	11	Final
Saskatchewan (Manners) 🔨	1	0	0	1	0	0	2	0	0	1	0	5
British Columbia (Cotter)	0	0	1	0	1	1	0	1	1	0	1	6

Sheet B	1	2	3	4	5	6	7	8	9	10	Final
Northwest Territories/Yukon (J. Koe) 🔨	2	1	0	0	3	0	0	2	0	X	8
Northern Ontario (Jacobs)	0	0	2	0	0	1	1	0	1	X	5

Sheet C	1	2	3	4	5	6	7	8	9	10	Final
Quebec (Desjardins)	0	0	1	0	1	0	0	X	X	X	2
Alberta (K. Koe) 🔨	1	1	0	4	0	2	1	X	X	X	9

Sheet D	1	2	3	4	5	6	7	8	9	10	11	Final
Newfoundland and Labrador (Gushue) 🔨	1	0	1	0	1	0	1	0	0	1	0	5
Ontario (Howard)	0	1	0	1	0	0	0	1	2	0	1	6

=== Draw 5 ===
Sunday, March 4, 6:30 PM

Sheet A	1	2	3	4	5	6	7	8	9	10	11	Final
Northwest Territories/Yukon (J. Koe)	0	0	0	2	1	0	2	0	1	0	4	10
Ontario (Howard) 🔨	0	1	1	0	0	1	0	1	0	2	0	6

Sheet B	1	2	3	4	5	6	7	8	9	10	Final
New Brunswick (Odishaw) 🔨	2	1	0	1	2	0	0	1	0	1	8
Nova Scotia (Murphy)	0	0	1	0	0	2	2	0	1	0	6

Sheet C	1	2	3	4	5	6	7	8	9	10	Final
Prince Edward Island (Gaudet)	0	1	0	0	0	0	2	0	0	X	3
Manitoba (Fowler) 🔨	2	0	0	2	0	1	0	0	3	X	8

Sheet D	1	2	3	4	5	6	7	8	9	10	Final
Saskatchewan (Manners)	1	0	2	0	1	0	1	1	0	0	6
Quebec (Desjardins) 🔨	0	1	0	1	0	1	0	0	1	1	5

=== Draw 6 ===
Monday, March 5, 8:30 AM

Sheet B	1	2	3	4	5	6	7	8	9	10	11	Final
Quebec (Desjardins)	1	1	0	0	2	0	1	1	0	2	0	8
Ontario (Howard) 🔨	0	0	2	1	0	3	0	0	2	0	1	9

Sheet C	1	2	3	4	5	6	7	8	9	10	Final
Saskatchewan (Manners)	0	0	3	0	1	0	1	0	0	X	5
Northwest Territories/Yukon (J. Koe) 🔨	1	0	0	1	0	2	0	4	1	X	9

=== Draw 7 ===
Monday, March 5, 1:30 PM

Sheet A	1	2	3	4	5	6	7	8	9	10	Final
New Brunswick (Odishaw) 🔨	2	0	2	2	1	0	0	1	X	X	8
Northern Ontario (Jacobs)	0	1	0	0	0	1	1	0	X	X	3

Sheet B	1	2	3	4	5	6	7	8	9	10	Final
Alberta (K. Koe) 🔨	0	0	2	2	0	1	0	3	X	X	8
Prince Edward Island (Gaudet)	1	0	0	0	0	0	1	0	X	X	2

Sheet C	1	2	3	4	5	6	7	8	9	10	Final
Nova Scotia (Murphy) 🔨	1	0	2	0	0	2	0	0	0	X	5
Newfoundland and Labrador (Gushue)	0	1	0	4	2	0	2	0	1	X	10

Sheet D	1	2	3	4	5	6	7	8	9	10	Final
Manitoba (Fowler) 🔨	2	1	0	0	0	0	1	1	0	X	5
British Columbia (Cotter)	0	0	1	1	1	3	0	0	3	X	9

=== Draw 8 ===
Monday, March 5, 6:30 PM

Sheet A	1	2	3	4	5	6	7	8	9	10	Final
Alberta (K. Koe)	1	1	0	2	0	0	2	0	0	X	6
Saskatchewan (Manners) 🔨	0	0	1	0	0	1	0	0	1	X	3

Sheet B	1	2	3	4	5	6	7	8	9	10	Final
Newfoundland and Labrador (Gushue)	0	1	1	0	2	0	0	2	0	X	6
Northwest Territories/Yukon (J. Koe) 🔨	3	0	0	2	0	3	1	0	1	X	10

Sheet C	1	2	3	4	5	6	7	8	9	10	Final
British Columbia (Cotter)	0	0	2	0	1	0	0	0	0	2	5
Quebec (Desjardins) 🔨	1	0	0	1	0	0	0	1	1	0	4

Sheet D	1	2	3	4	5	6	7	8	9	10	11	Final
Ontario (Howard)	1	0	0	1	0	2	0	0	1	0	1	6
Northern Ontario (Jacobs) 🔨	0	1	0	0	1	0	0	1	0	2	0	5

=== Draw 9 ===
Tuesday, March 6, 8:30 AM

Sheet A	1	2	3	4	5	6	7	8	9	10	Final
Manitoba (Fowler) 🔨	1	0	2	0	2	0	4	0	1	X	10
Nova Scotia (Murphy)	0	2	0	2	0	1	0	2	0	X	7

Sheet B	1	2	3	4	5	6	7	8	9	10	Final
Northern Ontario (Jacobs)	0	0	1	0	1	0	0	1	0	X	3
British Columbia (Cotter) 🔨	0	1	0	2	0	0	1	0	3	X	7

Sheet C	1	2	3	4	5	6	7	8	9	10	Final
New Brunswick (Odishaw)	2	0	0	2	0	0	2	0	0	X	6
Prince Edward Island (Gaudet) 🔨	0	0	2	0	3	0	0	3	0	X	8

Sheet D	1	2	3	4	5	6	7	8	9	10	Final
Alberta (K. Koe)	1	1	0	1	0	0	2	3	X	X	8
Newfoundland and Labrador (Gushue) 🔨	0	0	1	0	0	0	0	0	X	X	1

=== Draw 10 ===
Tuesday, March 6, 1:30 PM

Sheet A	1	2	3	4	5	6	7	8	9	10	Final
British Columbia (Cotter)	0	1	0	2	0	1	0	0	1	1	6
Newfoundland and Labrador (Gushue) 🔨	1	0	2	0	2	0	1	2	0	0	8

Sheet B	1	2	3	4	5	6	7	8	9	10	11	Final
Ontario (Howard) 🔨	1	1	1	0	0	1	0	1	0	0	2	7
Saskatchewan (Manners)	0	0	0	2	1	0	1	0	0	1	0	5

Sheet C	1	2	3	4	5	6	7	8	9	10	Final
Alberta (K. Koe)	0	0	2	0	1	0	0	2	1	0	6
Northern Ontario (Jacobs) 🔨	1	1	0	1	0	2	1	0	0	1	7

Sheet D	1	2	3	4	5	6	7	8	9	10	11	Final
Quebec (Desjardins) 🔨	1	0	1	0	1	0	2	0	0	2	0	7
Northwest Territories/Yukon (J. Koe)	0	1	0	2	0	2	0	2	0	0	1	8

=== Draw 11 ===
Tuesday, March 6, 6:30 PM

Sheet A	1	2	3	4	5	6	7	8	9	10	Final
Prince Edward Island (Gaudet)	0	1	3	0	3	0	1	1	0	X	9
Northwest Territories/Yukon (Koe) 🔨	2	0	0	1	0	2	0	0	1	X	6

Sheet B	1	2	3	4	5	6	7	8	9	10	Final
New Brunswick (Odishaw)	0	1	0	1	0	0	1	X	X	X	3
Quebec (Desjardins) 🔨	1	0	4	0	1	2	0	X	X	X	8

Sheet C	1	2	3	4	5	6	7	8	9	10	Final
Manitoba (Fowler) 🔨	0	1	0	0	0	1	0	2	0	X	4
Ontario (Howard)	0	0	0	2	3	0	2	0	1	X	8

Sheet D	1	2	3	4	5	6	7	8	9	10	Final
Saskatchewan (Manners) 🔨	1	0	0	1	0	1	0	3	1	0	7
Nova Scotia (Murphy)	0	3	0	0	1	0	4	0	0	2	10

=== Draw 12 ===
Wednesday, March 7, 8:30 AM

Sheet A	1	2	3	4	5	6	7	8	9	10	Final
Northern Ontario (Jacobs) 🔨	0	2	0	1	1	2	0	3	X	X	9
Quebec (Desjardins)	1	0	1	0	0	0	0	0	X	X	2

Sheet B	1	2	3	4	5	6	7	8	9	10	Final
Northwest Territories/Yukon (J. Koe)	0	2	0	0	0	1	0	X	X	X	3
Alberta (K. Koe) 🔨	1	0	3	2	3	0	2	X	X	X	11

Sheet C	1	2	3	4	5	6	7	8	9	10	Final
Newfoundland and Labrador (Gushue) 🔨	2	0	1	0	1	0	0	2	0	4	10
Saskatchewan (Manners)	0	2	0	1	0	1	1	0	1	0	6

Sheet D	1	2	3	4	5	6	7	8	9	10	Final
British Columbia (Cotter) 🔨	0	1	1	0	1	0	1	0	0	0	4
Ontario (Howard)	1	0	0	2	0	1	0	1	0	3	8

=== Draw 13 ===
Wednesday, March 7, 1:30 PM

Sheet A	1	2	3	4	5	6	7	8	9	10	Final
Saskatchewan (Manners)	2	0	2	0	1	0	0	2	1	0	8
New Brunswick (Odishaw) 🔨	0	3	0	2	0	1	3	0	0	0	9

Sheet B	1	2	3	4	5	6	7	8	9	10	Final
Prince Edward Island (Gaudet) 🔨	1	0	2	0	1	0	1	0	X	X	5
Ontario (Howard)	0	2	0	3	0	4	0	1	X	X	10

Sheet C	1	2	3	4	5	6	7	8	9	10	Final
Quebec (Desjardins) 🔨	3	0	1	0	0	0	0	1	0	2	7
Nova Scotia (Murphy)	0	2	0	1	1	1	0	0	1	0	6

Sheet D	1	2	3	4	5	6	7	8	9	10	Final
Northwest Territories/Yukon (J. Koe)	0	2	0	0	2	0	1	0	X	X	5
Manitoba (Fowler) 🔨	2	0	1	4	0	2	0	1	X	X	10

=== Draw 14 ===
Wednesday, March 7, 6:30 PM

Sheet A	1	2	3	4	5	6	7	8	9	10	Final
Manitoba (Fowler) 🔨	2	0	1	1	1	0	1	0	1	1	8
Alberta (K. Koe)	0	2	0	0	0	2	0	1	0	0	5

Sheet B	1	2	3	4	5	6	7	8	9	10	Final
Nova Scotia (Murphy)	0	1	0	0	2	0	1	0	0	X	4
Northern Ontario (Jacobs) 🔨	1	0	2	1	0	2	0	1	4	X	11

Sheet C	1	2	3	4	5	6	7	8	9	10	Final
Prince Edward Island (Gaudet) 🔨	2	0	0	0	0	2	0	2	0	1	7
British Columbia (Cotter)	0	1	0	2	1	0	0	0	1	0	5

Sheet D	1	2	3	4	5	6	7	8	9	10	Final
Newfoundland and Labrador (Gushue)	0	0	1	0	1	1	0	1	0	0	4
New Brunswick (Odishaw) 🔨	1	0	0	1	0	0	2	0	1	1	6

=== Draw 15 ===
Thursday, March 8, 8:30 AM

Sheet A	1	2	3	4	5	6	7	8	9	10	Final
Ontario (Howard) 🔨	2	0	1	0	4	0	0	1	X	X	8
Nova Scotia (Murphy)	0	1	0	1	0	0	1	0	X	X	3

Sheet B	1	2	3	4	5	6	7	8	9	10	Final
Saskatchewan (Manners)	0	0	0	0	1	0	2	0	X	X	3
Manitoba (Fowler) 🔨	3	0	0	1	0	1	0	4	X	X	9

Sheet C	1	2	3	4	5	6	7	8	9	10	Final
Northwest Territories/Yukon (J. Koe) 🔨	1	0	0	1	2	0	2	2	0	1	9
New Brunswick (Odishaw)	0	1	1	0	0	3	0	0	1	0	6

Sheet D	1	2	3	4	5	6	7	8	9	10	Final
Prince Edward Island (Gaudet)	0	5	0	1	0	1	0	0	1	0	8
Quebec (Desjardins) 🔨	2	0	1	0	4	0	2	0	0	1	10

=== Draw 16 ===
Thursday, March 8, 1:30 PM

Sheet A	1	2	3	4	5	6	7	8	9	10	Final
Newfoundland and Labrador (Gushue)	1	0	0	2	0	2	0	1	4	X	10
Prince Edward Island (Gaudet) 🔨	0	1	1	0	2	0	1	0	0	X	5

Sheet B	1	2	3	4	5	6	7	8	9	10	Final
British Columbia (Cotter)	0	0	0	2	1	0	2	0	0	0	5
New Brunswick (Odishaw) 🔨	2	0	0	0	0	2	0	1	1	1	7

Sheet C	1	2	3	4	5	6	7	8	9	10	Final
Northern Ontario (Jacobs)	0	1	0	2	0	1	0	0	X	X	4
Manitoba (Fowler) 🔨	2	0	2	0	3	0	1	2	X	X	10

Sheet D	1	2	3	4	5	6	7	8	9	10	Final
Nova Scotia (Murphy)	0	0	0	1	1	0	1	0	X	X	3
Alberta (K. Koe) 🔨	1	0	3	0	0	2	0	2	X	X	8

=== Draw 17 ===
Thursday, March 8, 6:30 PM

Sheet A	1	2	3	4	5	6	7	8	9	10	Final
Northwest Territories/Yukon (J. Koe)	2	1	0	1	0	2	0	1	1	X	8
British Columbia (Cotter) 🔨	0	0	1	0	1	0	1	0	0	X	3

Sheet B	1	2	3	4	5	6	7	8	9	10	Final
Quebec (Desjardins)	0	1	0	1	0	1	0	0	X	X	3
Newfoundland and Labrador (Gushue) 🔨	1	0	0	0	1	0	2	3	X	X	7

Sheet C	1	2	3	4	5	6	7	8	9	10	Final
Ontario (Howard)	0	0	0	1	0	0	2	0	3	X	6
Alberta (K. Koe) 🔨	0	0	0	0	1	0	0	2	0	X	3

Sheet D	1	2	3	4	5	6	7	8	9	10	Final
Northern Ontario (Jacobs)	0	0	2	0	1	1	0	2	0	0	6
Saskatchewan (Manners) 🔨	0	1	0	2	0	0	1	0	2	1	7

== Playoffs ==
Page playoff system
1	Ontario	9
2	Manitoba	3
3	Alberta	10
4	Northwest Territories/Yukon	6

Semifinal
2	Manitoba	6
3	Alberta	8

Final
1	Ontario	7
3	Alberta	6

Bronze Medal Game
4	Northwest Territories/Yukon	7
2	Manitoba	8

=== 1 vs. 2 ===
Friday, March 9, 6:30 PM

Sheet B	1	2	3	4	5	6	7	8	9	10	Final
Ontario (Howard) 🔨	2	0	2	0	3	0	2	0	X	X	9
Manitoba (Fowler)	0	0	0	1	0	1	0	1	X	X	3

Player Percentages
Ontario		Manitoba	
Craig Savill	93%	Derek Samagalski	94%
Brent Laing	97%	Richard Daneault	83%
Wayne Middaugh	97%	Allan Lyburn	84%
Wayne Middaugh	97%	William Lyburn (Note: William Lyburn was brought in to play for the 8th end, throwing third stones.)	75%
Glenn Howard	89%	Rob Fowler	73%
Total	94%	Total	83%

=== 3 vs. 4 ===
Saturday, March 10, 1:30 PM

Sheet B	1	2	3	4	5	6	7	8	9	10	Final
Alberta (K. Koe) 🔨	0	2	0	1	0	2	1	4	0	X	10
Northwest Territories/Yukon (J. Koe)	0	0	2	0	2	0	0	0	2	X	6

Player Percentages
Alberta		Northwest Territories/Yukon	
Nolan Thiessen	86%	Robert Borden	86%
Carter Rycroft	83%	Brad Chorostkowski	72%
Pat Simmons	89%	Tom Naugler	76%
Blake MacDonald (Note: Blake MacDonald was brought into the game during the 9th end at the third position.)	88%	Tom Naugler	76%
Kevin Koe	85%	Jamie Koe	74%
Total	86%	Total	77%

=== Semifinal ===
Saturday, March 10, 7:00 PM

Sheet C	1	2	3	4	5	6	7	8	9	10	Final
Manitoba (Fowler) 🔨	0	1	0	2	0	0	1	0	2	0	6
Alberta (K. Koe)	0	0	1	0	1	1	0	4	0	1	8

Player Percentages
Manitoba		Alberta	
Derek Samagalski	88%	Nolan Thiessen	83%
Richard Daneault	83%	Carter Rycroft	81%
Allan Lyburn	80%	Pat Simmons	75%
Rob Fowler	66%	Kevin Koe	84%
Total	79%	Total	81%

=== Bronze medal game ===
Sunday, March 11, 9:00 AM

Sheet C	1	2	3	4	5	6	7	8	9	10	11	Final
Northwest Territories/Yukon (J. Koe)	0	2	0	1	0	2	0	1	0	1	0	7
Manitoba (Fowler) 🔨	1	0	2	0	1	0	1	0	2	0	1	8

Player Percentages
Northwest Territories/Yukon		Manitoba	
Robert Borden	83%	Derek Samagalski	89%
Brad Chorostkowski	60%	Richard Daneault	82%
Tom Naugler	73%	Allan Lyburn	86%
Jamie Koe	84%	Rob Fowler	90%
Total	75%	Total	87%

=== Final ===
Sunday, March 11, 6:00 PM

Sheet C	1	2	3	4	5	6	7	8	9	10	Final
Ontario (Howard) 🔨	2	0	0	2	0	2	0	1	0	0	7
Alberta (K. Koe)	0	1	0	0	1	0	1	0	2	1	6

Player Percentages
Ontario		Alberta	
Craig Savill	86%	Nolan Thiessen	83%
Brent Laing	91%	Carter Rycroft	79%
Wayne Middaugh	98%	Pat Simmons	78%
Glenn Howard	95%	Kevin Koe	81%
Total	92%	Total	80%

== Top 5 player percentages ==
The top five player percentages for each position from the round robin are listed as follows:

Leads	%
(Manitoba) Derek Samagalski	90
(Ontario) Craig Savill	89
(Alberta) Nolan Thiessen	88
(British Columbia) Rick Sawatsky	87
(Saskatchewan) Mike Armstrong	87

Seconds	%
(Alberta) Carter Rycroft	89
(Ontario) Brent Laing	87
(Newfoundland and Labrador) Adam Casey	85
(Manitoba) Richard Daneault	85
(Northern Ontario) Ryan Harnden	84

Thirds	%
(Ontario) Wayne Middaugh	87
(Manitoba) Allan Lyburn	85
(Alberta) Pat Simmons	85
(Newfoundland and Labrador) Ryan Fry	84
(Saskatchewan) Tyler Lang	84

Skips	%
(Ontario) Glenn Howard	86
(Alberta) Kevin Koe	83
(Northwest Territories) Jamie Koe	79
(Manitoba) Rob Fowler	79
(Northern Ontario) Brad Jacobs	78

== Awards and honours ==
The all-star teams and award winners are as follows:

All-Star Teams

First Team

- Skip: Glenn Howard, Ontario
- Third: Wayne Middaugh, Ontario
- Second: Carter Rycroft, Alberta
- Lead: Derek Samagalski, Manitoba

Second Team

- Skip: Kevin Koe, Alberta
- Third: Allan Lyburn, Manitoba
- Second: Brent Laing, Ontario
- Lead: Nolan Thiessen, Alberta

Ross Harstone Award

- Scott Manners, Saskatchewan skip

Scotty Harper Award

- Paul Wiecek, Winnipeg Free Press
  - Wiecek received a $500 media award

Paul McLean Award

- Len Dubyts, CBC & TSN overhead camera operator

== Provincial and territorial playdowns ==
- 2012 Boston Pizza Cup (Alberta)
- (British Columbia) 2012 Canadian Direct Insurance BC Men's Curling Championship
- 2012 Safeway Championship (Manitoba)
- (New Brunswick) 2012 Molson Canadian Men's Provincial Curling Championship
- 2012 Newfoundland and Labrador Tankard
- The Dominion 2012 Northern Ontario Men's Curling Championship
- 2012 Nova Scotia Men's Molson Provincial Championship
- 2012 The Dominion Tankard (Ontario)
- (Prince Edward Island) 2012 PEI Tankard
- 2012 Quebec Men's Provincial Curling Championship
- 2012 SaskTel Tankard (Saskatchewan)
- (Northwest Territories) 2012 Yukon/NWT Men's Curling Championship
