= Serge Reid =

Canadian curler

- Curler
- Born: c. 1963; Jonquière, Quebec

Team
- Curling club: CC Kénogami, Jonquière, QC

Curling career
- Brier: 1 (2010)

Serge Reid (born c. 1963) is a Canadian curler from Jonquière, Quebec.

Reid is the defending provincial champion skip for Quebec. He and his team of François Gionest, Simon Collin and Steeve Villeneuve won their first provincial championship in 2010. This qualified them for the 2010 Tim Hortons Brier, where they were an unknown team to many of the other competitors. However, they won five of their eleven games, a respectable finish. As of 2014, Reid has played in 16 provincial championships.

Reid has won four World Curling Tour events to date. In 2004 he won both the Charlevoix Casino Classic and the Coupe Saguenay de Curling. He won the Coupe Saguenay again in 2005. In 2010 he won the Challenge Casino Lac Leamy.

After the 2010-11 curling season ended, Reid's team announced in a tweet that Pierre Charette would be joining their rink as skip and would throw lead stones, replacing Villeneuve. After one season with Charette as skip, the team broke up.
