= Martin Crête =

Canadian curler

- Curler
- Born: March 12, 1985 (age 41); Quebec City, Quebec

Team
- Curling club: CC Etchemin, Saint-Romuald, QC
- Skip: Martin Crête
- Third: Philippe Brassard
- Second: Jean-François Trépanier
- Lead: Philippe Ménard

Curling career
- Member Association: Quebec
- Brier: 13 (2008, 2009, 2013, 2014, 2015, 2016, 2017, 2019, 2021, 2022, 2023, 2025, 2026)
- Top CTRS ranking: 11th (2007–08, 2013–14)

Martin Crête (born March 12, 1985) is a retired Canadian curler from Lévis, Quebec. He currently skips his own team. He was the long time third for Jean-Michel Ménard from 2007 to 2018 and again from 2024 to 2026.

== Career ==
Crête played as a competitive junior skip near the beginning of his career, finishing as the runner-up at the 2002 Canadian Junior Curling Championships and in third place at the 2003 Canadian Junior Curling Championships. He also skipped Team Quebec at the 2004, 2005, and 2006 Canadian Junior Championships, finishing sixth, fourth, and fourth, respectively. He also competed in the 2006 Quebec men's provincial championship, finishing tied for fifth after a loss to Pierre Charette in the playoffs.

After he joined Jean-Michel Ménard as third, Crête went to his first Brier in 2008, where he represented Quebec under Ménard. They finished in sixth place with a 4–7 win–loss record. The team returned the next year, finishing in fifth place with a 7–4 win–loss record after losing the tiebreaker for the fourth place playoff spot against Manitoba's Jeff Stoughton. Crête and the rest of the team won the Quebec provincials again in 2013 and returned to the Brier, where, after a strong start, they finished in sixth place with a 6–5 win–loss record. The team won the Quebec Tankard again in 2014, and had a strong performance at the 2014 Tim Hortons Brier, finishing 7–4 in the round robin, winning the 3–4 game, but losing in semifinal and the bronze medal game. The team won their third straight provincial Tankard in 2015. At the 2015 Tim Hortons Brier, they had to settle with a 6–5 record, missing the playoffs. They won a fourth straight Quebec Tankard in 2016, but had a rather lackluster 2016 Tim Hortons Brier, finishing with a 4–7 record. The team won their final Tankard in 2017 together. They had a strong performance at the 2017 Tim Hortons Brier, finishing with a 7–4 record, but that year it was not good enough to make the playoffs. The team lost in the final of the 2018 provincials to Mike Fournier, and did not make that year's Brier. At the end of the season, Ménard retired from competitive curling and Crête took over the team as skip. Replacing Crête at third would be Philippe Lemay.

In their first Tankard with their new lineup, Crête beat Fournier in the final, and represented Quebec at the 2019 Tim Hortons Brier, where he led Team Quebec to a 3–4 finish, missing the championship round. The following season, his team only played in one event, the 2019 La Classique Ville de Levis, where they lost in the final to Vincent Roberge.

Crête joined the Mike Fournier team for the 2020–21 season. Due to the COVID-19 pandemic in Quebec, the 2021 provincial championship was cancelled. Curling Québec then decided to appoint Team Fournier to represent Quebec at the 2021 Tim Hortons Brier in Calgary, Alberta. The event was played in a bio-secure bubble to prevent the spread of the virus. At the Brier, they finished with a 4–4 record, failing to qualify for the championship round.

In their first event of the 2021–22 season, Team Fournier reached the final of the Capital Curling Fall Open. Because of their previous successes on tour, the team had enough points to qualify for the 2021 Canadian Olympic Curling Pre-Trials. At the Pre-Trials, the team finished the round robin with a 3–3 record, missing the playoff round. Later in the season, they won the Challenge Casino de Charlevoix and reached the final of both the Stu Sells 1824 Halifax Classic and the Finale du Circuit. The Quebec Tankard was once again cancelled due to the pandemic and Team Fournier were named as the provinces representatives for the 2022 Tim Hortons Brier. At the Brier, the team finished once again with a 4–4, placing sixth in their pool. Following the season, skip Mike Fournier moved to Ontario and Félix Asselin took over as skip of the team with Émile Asselin coming in to play second.

In 2024, it was announced that Team Asselin would welcome Brier champion and longtime teammate of Crête, Jean-Michel Ménard, as the third. Ménard, halfway through the season would begin skipping the team, with Asselin continuing to throw fourth stones. Team Ménard would win the 2025 Quebec Tankard, qualifying them to represent Quebec at the 2025 Montana's Brier. At the Brier, the team finished 4–4, missing out on the playoffs.

Team Ménard would start the 2025–26 curling season at the 2025 Canadian Olympic Curling Pre-Trials, where they would finish with a 4–3 record, narrowly missing out on the playoffs. Ménard would again win the 2026 Quebec Tankard and represent Quebec at the 2026 Montana's Brier. Prior to the Brier, Crête and Ménard announced that they would be retiring at the end of the season. At his final Brier, Team Ménard finished 5–3, missing out on the playoffs due to the last-stone-draw tiebreaker.

== Personal life ==
Crête lives in Lévis, Quebec. He works as a Business Intelligence architect for Desjardins Group. He is married to fellow curler Véronique Brassard and has three children.
