= Philippe Lemay =

Canadian curler (born 1977)

- Curler
- Born: Cap-de-la-Madeleine, Quebec

Team
- Curling club: CC Grand-Mère, Grand-Mère, QC
- Skip: Martin Crête
- Third: Philippe Lemay
- Second: Éric Sylvain
- Lead: Philippe Ménard
- Alternate: Philippe Brassard

Curling career
- Brier: 2 (2007, 2019)
Medal record
Curling
Representing Canada
World Junior Championships
Silver medal – second place	1993 Grindelwald

Philippe Lemay (or LeMay) (born March 27, 1977) is a Canadian curler from Grandes-Piles, Quebec.

Lemay is most notable for playing second on the Quebec team, skipped by Pierre Charette at the 2007 Tim Hortons Brier. The team finished with a 4–7 record that year, missing the playoffs. Lemay himself curled well, at 82%, 5th among seconds.

Lemay was also an accomplished junior curler. He won the 1994 and 1997 Quebec Junior Curling Championships, as a skip. His team of Patrice Rousseau, Pierre LePage and Steve Beaudry represented Quebec at the 1994 Canadian Junior Curling Championships. The team finished the round robin in a tie for first place, with an 8–3 record. However, they lost to Alberta's Colin Davison in the semifinal.

In 1997, Lemay had a new team, consisting of Christian Cantin, Jonathan Hubert and Jean-Sébastien Roy. At the 1997 Canadian Junior Curling Championships, the team finished the round robin in a five-way tie for third place. They would be eliminated in their first tiebreaker game however, against the Yukon's Wyatt Redlin.

Following Juniors, Lemay played for such accomplished curlers as Pierre Charette and Martin Ferland. He began skipping his own team on the World Curling Tour in 2011. As of 2013, he has played in 11 Grand Slams; 6 with Charette (2005–2007), 4 with Ferland (2007–2009) and one as a skip (2012). The best Slam result to date for Lemay is a semi-final finish at the 2007 Players' Championships with Charette and a semi-final finish at the Dec. 2007 Canadian Open with Ferland.

Currently Lemay is the owner of "Performance Curling Wear", a curling equipment company.

== Personal life ==
Lemay has a partner and a daughter. He owns Performance Curling Wear and H15 Wakesurf Nautical Centre
