= Jean-Sébastien Roy =

Canadian curler

- Curler
- Born: August 14, 1977 (age 49); Jonquière, Quebec

Team
- Curling club: CC des Collines, Chelsea, QC
- Skip: Jean-Sébastien Roy
- Third: Steven Munroe
- Second: Pierre-Olivier Roy
- Lead: Louis-François Brassard
- Alternate: Jacob Lepage

Curling career
- Member Association: Quebec
- Brier: 2 (2004, 2012)
- Top CTRS ranking: 18th (2006–07)

Jean-Sébastien Roy (born August 14, 1977) is a Canadian curler from Gatineau, Quebec.

== Career ==
Roy is a two time provincial junior champion, winning in 1995 as the third for Yanick Gaudreault and in 1997 as the third for Philippe Lemay. At the 1995 Canadian Junior Curling Championships, Quebec finished with a 5–6 record. At the 1997 Canadian Juniors, the team finished the round robin with a 7–5 record, in a 5-way tie for 3rd place. They ended up losing their tiebreaker match to the Yukon team, skipped by Wyatt Redlin.

Roy won his first provincial men's championship in 2004 as the second for Daniel Lafleur. At the 2004 Nokia Brier, Quebec finished with a 3–8 record. He won his second provincial championship in 2012 with Desjardins.

In 2019, Roy and teammates Amélie Blais, Dan deWaard and Brenda Nicholls won the 2020 Canadian Mixed Curling Championship. The team went undefeated at the event, which was held in Roy's hometown of Jonquière. It was only the second time Quebec won the event.
