= Philippe Ménard =

Canadian curler

- Curler
- Born: August 15, 1986 (age 40); Amos, Quebec

Team
- Curling club: Mt. Bruno CC, Saint-Bruno-de-Montarville, QC
- Skip: Martin Crête
- Third: Philippe Brassard
- Second: Jean-François Trépanier
- Lead: Philippe Ménard

Curling career
- Member Association: Quebec
- Brier: 9 (2008, 2009, 2011, 2013, 2014, 2015, 2016, 2017, 2019)
- Top CTRS ranking: 11th (2013–14)

Philippe Ménard (born August 15, 1986) is a Canadian curler from Boucherville, Quebec. He currently plays lead on Team Martin Crête. He played for his brother, Jean-Michel's team from 2011 to 2018. He is known for wearing a bandana during play.

== Career ==
=== Juniors ===
Ménard was a member of the Quebec team at the 2006 Canadian Junior Curling Championships, skipped by Martin Crête. Ménard threw third stones on the team. The team finished with a 7–5 record, missing the playoffs in 6th place. Before then, Ménard played at the 2003 Canada Winter Games, placing 10th.

=== Men's ===
After juniors, Ménard would skip his own team for a season before joining the Simon Dupuis rink for the 2007–08 season, as his lead. That year, Ménard was invited to be Team Quebec's alternate at the 2008 Tim Hortons Brier. The team, skipped by brother Jean-Michel went 4–7, and Ménard would play in two matches. The next season, he joined the François Gagné rink. He again played as his brother's alternate, playing at the 2009 Tim Hortons Brier. The team went 7–4, losing in a tie breaker to Manitoba. Ménard did not play in any games, however. He then joined the Pierre Charette rink for one season, before joining the Gagné team again for a run at the 2011 Tim Hortons Brier, where Ménard played lead. The team would finish the round robin with a 3–8 record. After the season Ménard was recruited to his brother's rink as their lead in 2011. He has remained with his brother's team ever since.

In his first season with his brother, the team won the Challenge Casino Lac Leamy World Curling Tour event, and played in the 2011 BDO Canadian Open Grand Slam event, where they made the quarterfinals. The team did not make it to the Brier that year. The next season they played in two Grand Slam events, the 2012 ROGERS Masters of Curling and the 2012 Canadian Open of Curling, missing the playoffs in both events. They also played in the 2012 Tim Hortons Brier, finishing with a 6–5 record. In 2013–14, the team did not play in any Slams, but found success at the 2014 Tim Hortons Brier. There they made the playoffs after posting a 7-4 round robin record. However the team lost both of their playoff matches, including the bronze medal game, settling for fourth.

In 2014–15, the team again did not play in any Slams, but were the winners of the Challenge Casino de Charlevoix WCT event. They again went to the Brier, posting a 6–5 record at the 2015 Tim Hortons Brier. The next season they played in The National Grand Slam event, missing the playoffs. They played at the 2016 Tim Hortons Brier, finishing with a 4–7 record.

== Personal life ==
Ménard works as a procurement and logistics manager with Synectiq Inc. He has two children.
