= Guy Hemmings =

Canadian curler from Sorel (born 1962)

- Curler ♂
- Born: May 10, 1962 (age 64); Saint-Jean-sur-Richelieu, Quebec, Canada

Team
- Curling club: CC Aurèle-Racine, Sorel, QC

Curling career
- Brier: 4 (1998, 1999, 2001, 2003)
- Top CTRS ranking: 20th (2003-04)
Medal record
Men's curling
Representing Quebec
Labatt Brier
Silver medal – second place	1998 Winnipeg
Silver medal – second place	1999 Edmonton

Guy Hemmings (born May 10, 1962) is a Canadian curler from Sorel. Hemmings gained prominence after reaching the final of the Brier in 1998 and 1999. He is considered an ambassador for the game, not only in his home province of Quebec but across Canada which he crosses every year as part of his "Guy Hemmings Rockin' the House Tour". In his tour he conducts "junior clinics at local curling clubs, visits elementary and high schools, visits the sick kids' wings at area hospitals and will host media scrums and is the keynote speaker at receptions at local curling clubs."

Hemmings was born in Saint-Jean-sur-Richelieu, Quebec, and began curling in 1984 at the age of 22. Eight years later, he played in his first provincial championship. In 1998, he won his first provincial championship giving him the right to represent Quebec at the 1998 Labatt Brier. That year, he lost in the final to Ontario, skipped by Wayne Middaugh. The following year, Hemmings made it to the finals again but lost to Manitoba, skipped by Jeff Stoughton. In the 1999 semi-final, Hemmings won the game with a last-shot draw to the back of the button vs Gerald Shymko, which was the shot of the week. (Hemmings had had won that honour the previous year as well). In the year 2000 he was hired by the Canadian Curling Association at an annual stipend of $50000 to be their goodwill ambassador.

Hemmings qualified for both the 2001 Nokia Brier and the 2003 Nokia Brier, but never again reached the final. He has been unable to win the provincial championships since then.

Hemmings was a colour commentator during the 2006 Winter Olympics and is a French language colour commentator for RDS since the 2010 Winter Olympics.

Hemmings currently coaches the Gim Eun-ji curling team.

== Personal life ==
Hemmings currently works as a curling TV analyst. He is married.
