= 2018 Canadian Junior Curling Championships – Men's tournament =

2018 Canadian Junior Curling Championships Men's tournament
- Host city: Shawinigan, Québec
- Arena: Aréna Grand-Mère; Centre municipal de curling de Shawinigan
- Dates: January 13–21
- Winner: British Columbia
- Skip: Tyler Tardi
- Third: Sterling Middleton
- Second: Jordan Tardi
- Lead: Zac Curtis
- Coach: Paul Tardi
- Finalist: Northern Ontario (Tanner Horgan)

The men's tournament of the 2018 New Holland Canadian Junior Curling Championships was held from January 13 to 21 at the Aréna Grand-Mère and the Centre municipal de curling de Shawinigan.

== Teams ==
The teams are listed as follows:

| Province | Skip | Third | Second | Lead | Club(s) |
|---|---|---|---|---|---|
| Alberta | Karsten Sturmay | Chris Kennedy | Glenn Venance | Caleb Boorse | Saville SC, Edmonton |
| British Columbia | Tyler Tardi | Sterling Middleton | Jordan Tardi | Zachary Curtis | Langley CC, Langley; Royal City CC, New Westminster |
| Manitoba | J.T. Ryan | Jacques Gauthier | Colin Kurz | Brendan Bilawka | Assiniboine Memorial CC, Winnipeg |
| New Brunswick | Liam Marin | Tyler Smith | Felipe Marin | Dylan MacDonald | Thistle St. Andrew's CC, Saint John |
| Newfoundland and Labrador | Daniel Bruce | Ryan McNeil Lamswood | Andrew Bruce | Nathan King | Corner Brook CC, Corner Brook |
| Northwest Territories | Sawer Kaeser | Tristan MacPherson | Joe Sturgeon | Garrett Minute | Fort Smith CC, Fort Smith |
| Northern Ontario | Tanner Horgan | Jacob Horgan | Nicholas Bissonnette | Maxime Blais | Copper Cliff CC, Sudbury |
| Nova Scotia | Matthew Manuel | Adam Cocks | Nick Zachernuk | Alec Cameron | Mayflower CC, Halifax |
| Nunavut | David Aglukark | Javen Komaksiutiksak | Jarred Quintal | Isaac Strickland | Iqaluit CC, Iqaluit |
| Ontario | Matthew Hall | Jeff Wanless | Joey Hart | David Hart | Westmount G&CC, Kitchener |
| Prince Edward Island | Alex MacFadyen | James Dalton | Leslie Noye | Parker MacFadyen | Silver Fox C&YC, Summerside |
| Saskatchewan | Rylan Kleiter | Trevor Johnson | Joshua Mattern | Matthieu Taillon | Sutherland CC, Saskatoon |
| Quebec | Alek Bédard | Louis Quevillon | Émile Asselin | Bradley Lequin | CC Glenmore, Dollard-des-Ormeaux; CC Lacolle, Lacolle |
| Yukon | Joe Wallingham | Trygg Jensen | Brayden Klassen | Will Klassen | Whitehorse CC, Whitehorse |

== Round-robin standings ==
Final round-robin standings

Key
| Teams to Championship Pool |
| Teams to Tiebreakers |

| Pool A | Skip | W | L |
|---|---|---|---|
| British Columbia | Tyler Tardi | 5 | 1 |
| Manitoba | J.T. Ryan | 5 | 1 |
| Quebec | Alek Bédard | 4 | 2 |
| Nova Scotia | Matthew Manuel | 3 | 3 |
| New Brunswick | Liam Marin | 2 | 4 |
| Yukon | Joe Wallingham | 1 | 5 |
| Saskatchewan | Rylan Kleiter | 1 | 5 |

| Pool B | Skip | W | L |
|---|---|---|---|
| Northern Ontario | Tanner Horgan | 6 | 0 |
| Ontario | Matthew Hall | 5 | 1 |
| Alberta | Karsten Sturmay | 4 | 2 |
| Newfoundland and Labrador | Daniel Bruce | 3 | 3 |
| Prince Edward Island | Alex MacFayden | 2 | 4 |
| Northwest Territories | Sawer Kaeser | 1 | 5 |
| Nunavut | David Aglukark | 0 | 6 |

== Round-robin results ==
All draw times are listed in Eastern Standard Time (UTC−5:00).

=== Pool A ===
==== Draw 1 ====
Saturday, January 13, 09:30

| Sheet C | 1 | 2 | 3 | 4 | 5 | 6 | 7 | 8 | 9 | 10 | Final |
|---|---|---|---|---|---|---|---|---|---|---|---|
| Quebec (Bédard) | 0 | 3 | 0 | 0 | 2 | 0 | 2 | 0 | 0 | 2 | 9 |
| Saskatchewan (Kleiter) | 1 | 0 | 2 | 2 | 0 | 1 | 0 | 1 | 1 | 0 | 8 |

==== Draw 2 ====
Saturday, January 13, 14:00

| Sheet D | 1 | 2 | 3 | 4 | 5 | 6 | 7 | 8 | 9 | 10 | Final |
|---|---|---|---|---|---|---|---|---|---|---|---|
| Nova Scotia (Manuel) | 0 | 0 | 0 | 0 | 1 | 0 | 1 | 0 | X | X | 2 |
| Manitoba (Ryan) | 0 | 0 | 3 | 1 | 0 | 2 | 0 | 1 | X | X | 7 |

| Sheet E | 1 | 2 | 3 | 4 | 5 | 6 | 7 | 8 | 9 | 10 | Final |
|---|---|---|---|---|---|---|---|---|---|---|---|
| Yukon (Wallingham) | 0 | 2 | 0 | 0 | 2 | 0 | 0 | 1 | 0 | X | 5 |
| Quebec (Bédard) | 0 | 0 | 1 | 0 | 0 | 2 | 2 | 0 | 2 | X | 7 |

==== Draw 3 ====
Saturday, January 13, 19:30

| Sheet B | 1 | 2 | 3 | 4 | 5 | 6 | 7 | 8 | 9 | 10 | Final |
|---|---|---|---|---|---|---|---|---|---|---|---|
| New Brunswick (Marin) | 0 | 0 | 0 | 2 | 2 | 1 | 0 | 0 | 0 | 3 | 8 |
| Yukon (Wallingham) | 0 | 0 | 2 | 0 | 0 | 0 | 0 | 1 | 1 | 0 | 4 |

| Sheet G | 1 | 2 | 3 | 4 | 5 | 6 | 7 | 8 | 9 | 10 | Final |
|---|---|---|---|---|---|---|---|---|---|---|---|
| Saskatchewan (Kleiter) | 0 | 1 | 1 | 0 | 2 | 0 | 0 | 0 | 0 | 0 | 4 |
| British Columbia (Tardi) | 1 | 0 | 0 | 1 | 0 | 0 | 1 | 1 | 0 | 2 | 6 |

==== Draw 4 ====
Sunday, January 14, 09:30

| Sheet A | 1 | 2 | 3 | 4 | 5 | 6 | 7 | 8 | 9 | 10 | Final |
|---|---|---|---|---|---|---|---|---|---|---|---|
| Manitoba (Ryan) | 0 | 3 | 0 | 2 | 0 | 0 | 1 | 1 | X | X | 7 |
| New Brunswick (Marin) | 0 | 0 | 1 | 0 | 1 | 0 | 0 | 0 | X | X | 2 |

| Sheet F | 1 | 2 | 3 | 4 | 5 | 6 | 7 | 8 | 9 | 10 | Final |
|---|---|---|---|---|---|---|---|---|---|---|---|
| British Columbia (Tardi) | 0 | 0 | 0 | 1 | 0 | 0 | 0 | 1 | 0 | X | 2 |
| Nova Scotia (Manuel) | 0 | 0 | 2 | 0 | 0 | 0 | 2 | 0 | 1 | X | 5 |

==== Draw 5 ====
Sunday, January 14, 14:00

| Sheet F | 1 | 2 | 3 | 4 | 5 | 6 | 7 | 8 | 9 | 10 | Final |
|---|---|---|---|---|---|---|---|---|---|---|---|
| New Brunswick (Marin) | 1 | 1 | 1 | 1 | 1 | 0 | 0 | 2 | 0 | X | 7 |
| Saskatchewan (Kleiter) | 0 | 0 | 0 | 0 | 0 | 1 | 2 | 0 | 1 | X | 4 |

| Sheet H | 1 | 2 | 3 | 4 | 5 | 6 | 7 | 8 | 9 | 10 | Final |
|---|---|---|---|---|---|---|---|---|---|---|---|
| Yukon (Wallingham) | 0 | 1 | 0 | 0 | 2 | 0 | 0 | 1 | 0 | X | 4 |
| Nova Scotia (Manuel) | 1 | 0 | 2 | 0 | 0 | 3 | 1 | 0 | 0 | X | 7 |

==== Draw 6 ====
Sunday, January 14, 18:30

| Sheet A | 1 | 2 | 3 | 4 | 5 | 6 | 7 | 8 | 9 | 10 | Final |
|---|---|---|---|---|---|---|---|---|---|---|---|
| British Columbia (Tardi) | 5 | 0 | 2 | 0 | 1 | 0 | 0 | 2 | 2 | X | 12 |
| Yukon (Wallingham) | 0 | 1 | 0 | 1 | 0 | 1 | 1 | 0 | 0 | X | 4 |

| Sheet B | 1 | 2 | 3 | 4 | 5 | 6 | 7 | 8 | 9 | 10 | Final |
|---|---|---|---|---|---|---|---|---|---|---|---|
| Manitoba (Ryan) | 0 | 2 | 0 | 3 | 1 | 1 | 0 | 0 | 0 | X | 7 |
| Quebec (Bédard) | 0 | 0 | 1 | 0 | 0 | 0 | 0 | 2 | 1 | X | 4 |

==== Draw 7 ====
Monday, January 15, 09:30

| Sheet C | 1 | 2 | 3 | 4 | 5 | 6 | 7 | 8 | 9 | 10 | Final |
|---|---|---|---|---|---|---|---|---|---|---|---|
| Nova Scotia (Manuel) | 0 | 2 | 1 | 0 | 2 | 1 | 0 | 0 | 1 | 1 | 8 |
| New Brunswick (Marin) | 1 | 0 | 0 | 2 | 0 | 0 | 1 | 1 | 0 | 0 | 5 |

| Sheet E | 1 | 2 | 3 | 4 | 5 | 6 | 7 | 8 | 9 | 10 | Final |
|---|---|---|---|---|---|---|---|---|---|---|---|
| Saskatchewan (Kleiter) | 0 | 0 | 0 | 1 | 0 | 0 | 2 | 0 | 0 | X | 3 |
| Manitoba (Ryan) | 0 | 0 | 1 | 0 | 1 | 0 | 0 | 1 | 2 | X | 5 |

==== Draw 8 ====
Monday, January 15, 14:00

| Sheet D | 1 | 2 | 3 | 4 | 5 | 6 | 7 | 8 | 9 | 10 | 11 | Final |
|---|---|---|---|---|---|---|---|---|---|---|---|---|
| Quebec (Bédard) | 1 | 1 | 0 | 0 | 0 | 0 | 2 | 0 | 3 | 0 | 0 | 7 |
| British Columbia (Tardi) | 0 | 0 | 0 | 2 | 1 | 0 | 0 | 2 | 0 | 2 | 2 | 9 |

==== Draw 9 ====
Monday, January 15, 18:30

| Sheet A | 1 | 2 | 3 | 4 | 5 | 6 | 7 | 8 | 9 | 10 | Final |
|---|---|---|---|---|---|---|---|---|---|---|---|
| Nova Scotia (Manuel) | 2 | 0 | 2 | 0 | 0 | 1 | 1 | 0 | 1 | 0 | 7 |
| Quebec (Bédard) | 0 | 2 | 0 | 0 | 3 | 0 | 0 | 1 | 0 | 2 | 8 |

| Sheet F | 1 | 2 | 3 | 4 | 5 | 6 | 7 | 8 | 9 | 10 | Final |
|---|---|---|---|---|---|---|---|---|---|---|---|
| Manitoba (Ryan) | 2 | 0 | 0 | 3 | 2 | 1 | 0 | 2 | X | X | 10 |
| Yukon (Wallingham) | 0 | 0 | 1 | 0 | 0 | 0 | 1 | 0 | X | X | 2 |

==== Draw 10 ====
Tuesday, January 16, 09:30

| Sheet E | 1 | 2 | 3 | 4 | 5 | 6 | 7 | 8 | 9 | 10 | Final |
|---|---|---|---|---|---|---|---|---|---|---|---|
| New Brunswick (Marin) | 0 | 1 | 0 | 0 | 1 | 0 | 0 | 0 | 1 | X | 3 |
| British Columbia (Tardi) | 0 | 0 | 0 | 3 | 0 | 0 | 1 | 1 | 0 | X | 5 |

==== Draw 11 ====
Tuesday, January 16, 14:00

| Team | 1 | 2 | 3 | 4 | 5 | 6 | 7 | 8 | 9 | 10 | Final |
|---|---|---|---|---|---|---|---|---|---|---|---|
| British Columbia (Tardi) | 0 | 1 | 1 | 0 | 0 | 0 | 0 | 2 | 0 | 1 | 5 |
| Manitoba (Ryan) | 1 | 0 | 0 | 2 | 0 | 0 | 1 | 0 | 0 | 0 | 4 |

| Team | 1 | 2 | 3 | 4 | 5 | 6 | 7 | 8 | 9 | 10 | Final |
|---|---|---|---|---|---|---|---|---|---|---|---|
| Yukon (Wallingham) | 0 | 1 | 1 | 1 | 1 | 0 | 0 | 1 | 0 | 1 | 6 |
| Saskatchewan (Kleiter) | 1 | 0 | 0 | 0 | 0 | 2 | 0 | 0 | 1 | 0 | 4 |

==== Draw 12 ====
Tuesday, January 16, 18:30

| Team | 1 | 2 | 3 | 4 | 5 | 6 | 7 | 8 | 9 | 10 | Final |
|---|---|---|---|---|---|---|---|---|---|---|---|
| Saskatchewan (Kleiter) | 0 | 1 | 0 | 1 | 1 | 0 | 4 | 0 | 0 | 1 | 8 |
| Nova Scotia (Manuel) | 2 | 0 | 1 | 0 | 0 | 2 | 0 | 1 | 0 | 0 | 6 |

| Team | 1 | 2 | 3 | 4 | 5 | 6 | 7 | 8 | 9 | 10 | 11 | Final |
|---|---|---|---|---|---|---|---|---|---|---|---|---|
| Quebec (Bédard) | 0 | 1 | 0 | 3 | 0 | 3 | 0 | 0 | 0 | 1 | 1 | 9 |
| New Brunswick (Marin) | 1 | 0 | 1 | 0 | 2 | 0 | 2 | 1 | 1 | 0 | 0 | 8 |

=== Pool B ===
==== Draw 1 ====
Saturday, January 13, 09:30

| Sheet B | 1 | 2 | 3 | 4 | 5 | 6 | 7 | 8 | 9 | 10 | Final |
|---|---|---|---|---|---|---|---|---|---|---|---|
| Alberta (Sturmay) | 2 | 3 | 3 | 1 | 1 | 3 | 2 | 1 | X | X | 16 |
| Nunavut (Aglukark) | 0 | 0 | 0 | 0 | 0 | 0 | 0 | 0 | X | X | 0 |

| Sheet H | 1 | 2 | 3 | 4 | 5 | 6 | 7 | 8 | 9 | 10 | Final |
|---|---|---|---|---|---|---|---|---|---|---|---|
| Northwest Territories (Kaeser) | 0 | 1 | 0 | 0 | 0 | 1 | 0 | 0 | 0 | X | 2 |
| Ontario (Hall) | 1 | 0 | 1 | 1 | 1 | 0 | 1 | 1 | 2 | X | 8 |

==== Draw 2 ====
Saturday, January 13, 14:00

| Sheet A | 1 | 2 | 3 | 4 | 5 | 6 | 7 | 8 | 9 | 10 | 11 | Final |
|---|---|---|---|---|---|---|---|---|---|---|---|---|
| Northern Ontario (Horgan) | 0 | 1 | 0 | 0 | 0 | 2 | 0 | 0 | 1 | 1 | 1 | 6 |
| Alberta (Sturmay) | 1 | 0 | 0 | 1 | 0 | 0 | 1 | 2 | 0 | 0 | 0 | 5 |

| Sheet F | 1 | 2 | 3 | 4 | 5 | 6 | 7 | 8 | 9 | 10 | Final |
|---|---|---|---|---|---|---|---|---|---|---|---|
| Ontario (Hall) | 0 | 3 | 0 | 1 | 2 | 0 | 3 | 0 | X | X | 9 |
| Prince Edward Island (MacFadyen) | 1 | 0 | 0 | 0 | 0 | 1 | 0 | 1 | X | X | 3 |

==== Draw 3 ====
Saturday, January 13, 19:30

| Sheet C | 1 | 2 | 3 | 4 | 5 | 6 | 7 | 8 | 9 | 10 | Final |
|---|---|---|---|---|---|---|---|---|---|---|---|
| Newfoundland and Labrador (Bruce) | 0 | 2 | 0 | 0 | 3 | 0 | 1 | 0 | 1 | X | 7 |
| Northwest Territories (Kaeser) | 0 | 0 | 1 | 0 | 0 | 1 | 0 | 1 | 0 | X | 3 |

==== Draw 4 ====
Sunday, January 14, 09:30

| Sheet D | 1 | 2 | 3 | 4 | 5 | 6 | 7 | 8 | 9 | 10 | Final |
|---|---|---|---|---|---|---|---|---|---|---|---|
| Prince Edward Island (MacFadyen) | 0 | 1 | 0 | 1 | 0 | 1 | 0 | 1 | 0 | X | 4 |
| Northern Ontario (Horgan) | 2 | 0 | 3 | 0 | 0 | 0 | 2 | 0 | 1 | X | 8 |

| Sheet E | 1 | 2 | 3 | 4 | 5 | 6 | 7 | 8 | 9 | 10 | Final |
|---|---|---|---|---|---|---|---|---|---|---|---|
| Nunavut (Aglukark) | 0 | 0 | 0 | 1 | 0 | 1 | 0 | 0 | X | X | 2 |
| Newfoundland and Labrador (Bruce) | 1 | 1 | 4 | 0 | 1 | 0 | 4 | 1 | X | X | 12 |

==== Draw 5 ====
Sunday, January 14, 14:00

| Sheet D | 1 | 2 | 3 | 4 | 5 | 6 | 7 | 8 | 9 | 10 | Final |
|---|---|---|---|---|---|---|---|---|---|---|---|
| Newfoundland and Labrador (Bruce) | 1 | 0 | 0 | 2 | 0 | 2 | 0 | 0 | X | X | 5 |
| Ontario (Hall) | 0 | 0 | 3 | 0 | 2 | 0 | 2 | 3 | X | X | 10 |

==== Draw 6 ====
Sunday, January 14, 18:30

| Sheet G | 1 | 2 | 3 | 4 | 5 | 6 | 7 | 8 | 9 | 10 | Final |
|---|---|---|---|---|---|---|---|---|---|---|---|
| Alberta (Sturmay) | 3 | 0 | 0 | 2 | 1 | 3 | 2 | 1 | X | X | 12 |
| Northwest Territories (Kaeser) | 0 | 1 | 1 | 0 | 0 | 0 | 0 | 0 | X | X | 2 |

| Sheet H | 1 | 2 | 3 | 4 | 5 | 6 | 7 | 8 | 9 | 10 | Final |
|---|---|---|---|---|---|---|---|---|---|---|---|
| Nunavut (Aglukark) | 0 | 0 | 0 | 1 | 0 | 0 | 0 | X | X | X | 1 |
| Prince Edward Island (MacFadyen) | 1 | 4 | 3 | 0 | 2 | 3 | 3 | X | X | X | 16 |

==== Draw 7 ====
Monday, January 15, 09:30

| Sheet A | 1 | 2 | 3 | 4 | 5 | 6 | 7 | 8 | 9 | 10 | Final |
|---|---|---|---|---|---|---|---|---|---|---|---|
| Ontario (Hall) | 5 | 1 | 1 | 0 | 2 | 4 | X | X | X | X | 13 |
| Nunavut (Aglukark) | 0 | 0 | 0 | 1 | 0 | 0 | X | X | X | X | 1 |

| Sheet B | 1 | 2 | 3 | 4 | 5 | 6 | 7 | 8 | 9 | 10 | Final |
|---|---|---|---|---|---|---|---|---|---|---|---|
| Northern Ontario (Horgan) | 0 | 2 | 2 | 0 | 4 | 2 | 1 | 0 | X | X | 11 |
| Newfoundland and Labrador (Bruce) | 2 | 0 | 0 | 1 | 0 | 0 | 0 | 0 | X | X | 3 |

==== Draw 8 ====
Monday, January 15, 14:00

| Sheet C | 1 | 2 | 3 | 4 | 5 | 6 | 7 | 8 | 9 | 10 | Final |
|---|---|---|---|---|---|---|---|---|---|---|---|
| Prince Edward Island (MacFadyen) | 0 | 0 | 1 | 0 | 1 | 0 | 0 | 0 | 1 | X | 3 |
| Alberta (Sturmay) | 2 | 0 | 0 | 1 | 0 | 0 | 3 | 1 | 0 | X | 7 |

| Sheet E | 1 | 2 | 3 | 4 | 5 | 6 | 7 | 8 | 9 | 10 | Final |
|---|---|---|---|---|---|---|---|---|---|---|---|
| Northwest Territories (Kaeser) | 0 | 1 | 1 | 0 | 1 | 0 | 0 | 0 | X | X | 3 |
| Northern Ontario (Horgan) | 1 | 0 | 0 | 3 | 0 | 2 | 1 | 1 | X | X | 8 |

==== Draw 9 ====
Monday, January 15, 18:30

| Sheet B | 1 | 2 | 3 | 4 | 5 | 6 | 7 | 8 | 9 | 10 | Final |
|---|---|---|---|---|---|---|---|---|---|---|---|
| Northwest Territories (Kaeser) | 2 | 0 | 0 | 0 | 0 | 1 | 1 | 0 | 0 | X | 4 |
| Prince Edward Island (MacFadyen) | 0 | 1 | 1 | 1 | 1 | 0 | 0 | 4 | 1 | X | 9 |

| Sheet H | 1 | 2 | 3 | 4 | 5 | 6 | 7 | 8 | 9 | 10 | Final |
|---|---|---|---|---|---|---|---|---|---|---|---|
| Newfoundland and Labrador (Bruce) | 1 | 0 | 0 | 0 | 0 | 1 | 0 | 1 | 1 | X | 4 |
| Alberta (Sturmay) | 0 | 3 | 2 | 2 | 2 | 0 | 1 | 0 | 0 | X | 10 |

==== Draw 10 ====
Tuesday, January 16, 09:30

| Sheet A | 1 | 2 | 3 | 4 | 5 | 6 | 7 | 8 | 9 | 10 | Final |
|---|---|---|---|---|---|---|---|---|---|---|---|
| Prince Edward Island (MacFadyen) | 0 | 0 | 1 | 1 | 0 | 4 | 0 | 0 | 1 | 0 | 7 |
| Newfoundland and Labrador (Bruce) | 1 | 0 | 0 | 0 | 2 | 0 | 2 | 2 | 0 | 1 | 8 |

| Sheet F | 1 | 2 | 3 | 4 | 5 | 6 | 7 | 8 | 9 | 10 | Final |
|---|---|---|---|---|---|---|---|---|---|---|---|
| Northern Ontario (Horgan) | 6 | 0 | 2 | 2 | 0 | 2 | 0 | 5 | X | X | 17 |
| Nunavut (Aglukark) | 0 | 1 | 0 | 0 | 1 | 0 | 1 | 0 | X | X | 3 |

==== Draw 11 ====
Tuesday, January 16, 14:00

| Team | 1 | 2 | 3 | 4 | 5 | 6 | 7 | 8 | 9 | 10 | Final |
|---|---|---|---|---|---|---|---|---|---|---|---|
| Alberta (Sturmay) | 0 | 0 | 2 | 0 | 0 | 0 | 2 | 0 | 1 | 2 | 7 |
| Ontario (Hall) | 0 | 2 | 0 | 1 | 1 | 3 | 0 | 1 | 0 | 0 | 8 |

==== Draw 12 ====
Tuesday, January 16, 18:30

| Team | 1 | 2 | 3 | 4 | 5 | 6 | 7 | 8 | 9 | 10 | Final |
|---|---|---|---|---|---|---|---|---|---|---|---|
| Ontario (Hall) | 0 | 0 | 2 | 0 | 0 | 0 | 0 | 2 | X | X | 4 |
| Northern Ontario (Horgan) | 2 | 0 | 0 | 2 | 3 | 0 | 1 | 0 | X | X | 8 |

| Team | 1 | 2 | 3 | 4 | 5 | 6 | 7 | 8 | 9 | 10 | Final |
|---|---|---|---|---|---|---|---|---|---|---|---|
| Nunavut (Aglukark) | 0 | 0 | 0 | 0 | 0 | 0 | 2 | 0 | X | X | 2 |
| Northwest Territories (Kaeser) | 3 | 5 | 5 | 1 | 2 | 0 | 0 | 1 | X | X | 17 |

== Placement Round ==
=== Seeding Pool ===
==== Standings ====
Final round-robin standings

| Team | Skip | W | L |
|---|---|---|---|
| New Brunswick | Liam Marin | 4 | 5 |
| Prince Edward Island | Alex MacFayden | 4 | 5 |
| Saskatchewan | Rylan Kleiter | 4 | 5 |
| Yukon | Joe Wallingham | 3 | 6 |
| Northwest Territories | Sawer Kaeser | 1 | 8 |
| Nunavut | David Aglukark | 0 | 9 |

==== Draw 13 ====
Wednesday, January 17, 14:00

| Team | 1 | 2 | 3 | 4 | 5 | 6 | 7 | 8 | 9 | 10 | Final |
|---|---|---|---|---|---|---|---|---|---|---|---|
| Yukon (Wallingham) | 1 | 0 | 1 | 2 | 0 | 0 | 5 | 1 | X | X | 10 |
| Northwest Territories (Kaeser) | 0 | 1 | 0 | 0 | 1 | 0 | 0 | 0 | X | X | 2 |

| Team | 1 | 2 | 3 | 4 | 5 | 6 | 7 | 8 | 9 | 10 | Final |
|---|---|---|---|---|---|---|---|---|---|---|---|
| New Brunswick (Marin) | 0 | 0 | 1 | 2 | 3 | 0 | 3 | 2 | X | X | 11 |
| Nunavut (Aglukark) | 1 | 1 | 0 | 0 | 0 | 1 | 0 | 0 | X | X | 3 |

==== Draw 14 ====
Wednesday, January 17, 18:30

| Team | 1 | 2 | 3 | 4 | 5 | 6 | 7 | 8 | 9 | 10 | Final |
|---|---|---|---|---|---|---|---|---|---|---|---|
| Saskatchewan (Kleiter) | 2 | 2 | 1 | 5 | 1 | 0 | 2 | 0 | X | X | 13 |
| Nunavut (Aglukark) | 0 | 0 | 0 | 0 | 0 | 0 | 0 | 1 | X | X | 1 |

| Team | 1 | 2 | 3 | 4 | 5 | 6 | 7 | 8 | 9 | 10 | Final |
|---|---|---|---|---|---|---|---|---|---|---|---|
| Yukon (Wallingham) | 0 | 0 | 1 | 0 | 3 | 0 | 0 | 1 | 0 | X | 5 |
| Prince Edward Island (MacFayden) | 2 | 0 | 0 | 2 | 0 | 0 | 3 | 0 | 2 | X | 9 |

==== Draw 15 ====
Thursday, January 18, 09:30

| Team | 1 | 2 | 3 | 4 | 5 | 6 | 7 | 8 | 9 | 10 | Final |
|---|---|---|---|---|---|---|---|---|---|---|---|
| New Brunswick (Marin) | 4 | 0 | 1 | 0 | 1 | 0 | 0 | 1 | 0 | 1 | 8 |
| Northwest Territories (Kaeser) | 0 | 1 | 0 | 1 | 0 | 0 | 1 | 0 | 4 | 0 | 7 |

==== Draw 16 ====
Thursday, January 18, 14:00

| Team | 1 | 2 | 3 | 4 | 5 | 6 | 7 | 8 | 9 | 10 | Final |
|---|---|---|---|---|---|---|---|---|---|---|---|
| Yukon (Wallingham) | 0 | 2 | 2 | 0 | 1 | 1 | 0 | 1 | 0 | X | 7 |
| Nunavut (Aglukark) | 1 | 0 | 0 | 1 | 0 | 0 | 2 | 0 | 1 | X | 5 |

| Team | 1 | 2 | 3 | 4 | 5 | 6 | 7 | 8 | 9 | 10 | Final |
|---|---|---|---|---|---|---|---|---|---|---|---|
| Saskatchewan (Kleiter) | 3 | 0 | 2 | 0 | 2 | 0 | 2 | 1 | X | X | 10 |
| Northwest Territories (Kaeser) | 0 | 1 | 0 | 2 | 0 | 1 | 0 | 0 | X | X | 4 |

==== Draw 17 ====
Thursday, January 18, 18:30

| Team | 1 | 2 | 3 | 4 | 5 | 6 | 7 | 8 | 9 | 10 | Final |
|---|---|---|---|---|---|---|---|---|---|---|---|
| Saskatchewan (Kleiter) | 2 | 0 | 1 | 0 | 1 | 2 | 0 | 2 | 0 | 0 | 8 |
| Prince Edward Island (MacFayden) | 0 | 1 | 0 | 2 | 0 | 0 | 0 | 0 | 2 | 1 | 6 |

==== Draw 19 ====
Friday, January 19, 13:00

| Team | 1 | 2 | 3 | 4 | 5 | 6 | 7 | 8 | 9 | 10 | Final |
|---|---|---|---|---|---|---|---|---|---|---|---|
| New Brunswick (Marin) | 0 | 1 | 0 | 2 | 2 | 1 | 0 | 2 | 1 | 0 | 9 |
| Prince Edward Island (MacFayden) | 2 | 0 | 5 | 0 | 0 | 0 | 4 | 0 | 0 | 1 | 12 |

=== Championship Pool ===
==== Championship Pool Standings ====
Final round-robin standings

Key
| Teams to Playoffs |
| Teams to Tiebreakers |

| Province | Skip | W | L |
|---|---|---|---|
| Northern Ontario | Tanner Horgan | 8 | 2 |
| British Columbia | Tyler Tardi | 7 | 3 |
| Manitoba | J.T. Ryan | 7 | 3 |
| Ontario | Matthew Hall | 7 | 3 |
| Alberta | Karsten Sturmay | 7 | 3 |
| Nova Scotia | Matthew Manuel | 6 | 4 |
| Quebec | Alek Bédard | 5 | 5 |
| Newfoundland and Labrador | Daniel Bruce | 4 | 6 |

==== Draw 13 ====
Wednesday, January 17, 14:00

| Team | 1 | 2 | 3 | 4 | 5 | 6 | 7 | 8 | 9 | 10 | Final |
|---|---|---|---|---|---|---|---|---|---|---|---|
| Manitoba (Ryan) | 0 | 0 | 0 | 0 | 2 | 1 | 0 | 0 | 1 | X | 4 |
| Northern Ontario (Horgan) | 0 | 0 | 3 | 1 | 0 | 0 | 2 | 0 | 0 | X | 6 |

| Team | 1 | 2 | 3 | 4 | 5 | 6 | 7 | 8 | 9 | 10 | Final |
|---|---|---|---|---|---|---|---|---|---|---|---|
| British Columbia (Tardi) | 0 | 2 | 0 | 2 | 0 | 0 | 1 | 0 | X | X | 5 |
| Ontario (Hall) | 1 | 0 | 5 | 0 | 3 | 1 | 0 | 1 | X | X | 11 |

==== Draw 14 ====
Wednesday, January 17, 18:30

| Team | 1 | 2 | 3 | 4 | 5 | 6 | 7 | 8 | 9 | 10 | Final |
|---|---|---|---|---|---|---|---|---|---|---|---|
| Quebec (Bédard) | 0 | 0 | 0 | 0 | 0 | 2 | 0 | 0 | 2 | 0 | 4 |
| Alberta (Sturmay) | 0 | 2 | 1 | 0 | 0 | 0 | 0 | 1 | 0 | 1 | 5 |

| Team | 1 | 2 | 3 | 4 | 5 | 6 | 7 | 8 | 9 | 10 | Final |
|---|---|---|---|---|---|---|---|---|---|---|---|
| Nova Scotia (Manuel) | 1 | 0 | 1 | 0 | 0 | 3 | 0 | 1 | 0 | 1 | 7 |
| Newfoundland and Labrador (Bruce) | 0 | 1 | 0 | 2 | 0 | 0 | 2 | 0 | 1 | 0 | 6 |

==== Draw 15 ====
Thursday, January 18, 09:30

| Team | 1 | 2 | 3 | 4 | 5 | 6 | 7 | 8 | 9 | 10 | Final |
|---|---|---|---|---|---|---|---|---|---|---|---|
| British Columbia (Tardi) | 0 | 0 | 0 | 0 | 1 | 0 | 2 | 0 | X | X | 3 |
| Alberta (Sturmay) | 2 | 2 | 0 | 0 | 0 | 4 | 0 | 1 | X | X | 9 |

| Team | 1 | 2 | 3 | 4 | 5 | 6 | 7 | 8 | 9 | 10 | Final |
|---|---|---|---|---|---|---|---|---|---|---|---|
| Manitoba (Ryan) | 1 | 0 | 2 | 0 | 2 | 0 | 3 | 2 | X | X | 10 |
| Ontario (Hall) | 0 | 1 | 0 | 2 | 0 | 2 | 0 | 0 | X | X | 5 |

| Team | 1 | 2 | 3 | 4 | 5 | 6 | 7 | 8 | 9 | 10 | Final |
|---|---|---|---|---|---|---|---|---|---|---|---|
| Nova Scotia (Manuel) | 0 | 1 | 0 | 3 | 1 | 1 | 0 | 1 | 0 | X | 7 |
| Northern Ontario (Horgan) | 0 | 0 | 1 | 0 | 0 | 0 | 2 | 0 | 1 | X | 4 |

==== Draw 16 ====
Thursday, January 18, 14:00

| Team | 1 | 2 | 3 | 4 | 5 | 6 | 7 | 8 | 9 | 10 | Final |
|---|---|---|---|---|---|---|---|---|---|---|---|
| Quebec (Bédard) | 0 | 0 | 2 | 0 | 1 | 0 | 0 | 0 | 0 | X | 3 |
| Northern Ontario (Horgan) | 0 | 0 | 0 | 2 | 0 | 0 | 2 | 1 | 2 | X | 7 |

| Team | 1 | 2 | 3 | 4 | 5 | 6 | 7 | 8 | 9 | 10 | Final |
|---|---|---|---|---|---|---|---|---|---|---|---|
| Manitoba (Ryan) | 1 | 0 | 2 | 0 | 2 | 0 | 0 | 0 | 0 | 2 | 7 |
| Newfoundland and Labrador (Bruce) | 0 | 1 | 0 | 1 | 0 | 1 | 2 | 0 | 1 | 0 | 6 |

==== Draw 17 ====
Thursday, January 18, 18:30

| Team | 1 | 2 | 3 | 4 | 5 | 6 | 7 | 8 | 9 | 10 | Final |
|---|---|---|---|---|---|---|---|---|---|---|---|
| Quebec (Bédard) | 0 | 1 | 1 | 0 | 2 | 1 | 0 | 1 | 0 | 1 | 7 |
| Ontario (Hall) | 0 | 0 | 0 | 2 | 0 | 0 | 2 | 0 | 1 | 0 | 5 |

| Team | 1 | 2 | 3 | 4 | 5 | 6 | 7 | 8 | 9 | 10 | Final |
|---|---|---|---|---|---|---|---|---|---|---|---|
| British Columbia (Tardi) | 0 | 0 | 0 | 0 | 3 | 0 | 0 | 0 | 1 | 1 | 5 |
| Newfoundland and Labrador (Bruce) | 0 | 1 | 0 | 1 | 0 | 0 | 1 | 0 | 0 | 0 | 3 |

| Team | 1 | 2 | 3 | 4 | 5 | 6 | 7 | 8 | 9 | 10 | Final |
|---|---|---|---|---|---|---|---|---|---|---|---|
| Nova Scotia (Manuel) | 0 | 0 | 2 | 0 | 0 | 1 | 0 | 0 | 3 | X | 6 |
| Alberta (Sturmay) | 0 | 1 | 0 | 1 | 0 | 0 | 1 | 0 | 0 | X | 3 |

==== Draw 18 ====
Friday, January 19, 09:00

| Team | 1 | 2 | 3 | 4 | 5 | 6 | 7 | 8 | 9 | 10 | Final |
|---|---|---|---|---|---|---|---|---|---|---|---|
| Manitoba (Ryan) | 0 | 1 | 0 | 1 | 0 | 1 | 1 | 1 | 0 | 0 | 5 |
| Alberta (Sturmay) | 0 | 0 | 1 | 0 | 2 | 0 | 0 | 0 | 2 | 1 | 6 |

| Team | 1 | 2 | 3 | 4 | 5 | 6 | 7 | 8 | 9 | 10 | Final |
|---|---|---|---|---|---|---|---|---|---|---|---|
| Nova Scotia (Manuel) | 0 | 0 | 2 | 0 | 1 | 0 | 0 | 1 | X | X | 4 |
| Ontario (Hall) | 2 | 3 | 0 | 5 | 0 | 0 | 1 | 0 | X | X | 11 |

| Team | 1 | 2 | 3 | 4 | 5 | 6 | 7 | 8 | 9 | 10 | Final |
|---|---|---|---|---|---|---|---|---|---|---|---|
| British Columbia (Tardi) | 0 | 0 | 0 | 2 | 1 | 0 | 0 | 0 | 1 | 2 | 6 |
| Northern Ontario (Horgan) | 0 | 0 | 2 | 0 | 0 | 2 | 0 | 1 | 0 | 0 | 5 |

| Team | 1 | 2 | 3 | 4 | 5 | 6 | 7 | 8 | 9 | 10 | Final |
|---|---|---|---|---|---|---|---|---|---|---|---|
| Quebec (Bédard) | 0 | 1 | 1 | 1 | 0 | 0 | 0 | 1 | 0 | 1 | 5 |
| Newfoundland and Labrador (Bruce) | 1 | 0 | 0 | 0 | 1 | 1 | 1 | 0 | 3 | 0 | 7 |

== Tiebreakers ==
Friday, January 19, 13:30

| Team | 1 | 2 | 3 | 4 | 5 | 6 | 7 | 8 | 9 | 10 | Final |
|---|---|---|---|---|---|---|---|---|---|---|---|
| Ontario (Hall) | 1 | 0 | 0 | 1 | 1 | 0 | 0 | 1 | 0 | X | 4 |
| Manitoba (Ryan) | 0 | 1 | 1 | 0 | 0 | 2 | 2 | 0 | 1 | X | 7 |

| Team | 1 | 2 | 3 | 4 | 5 | 6 | 7 | 8 | 9 | 10 | 11 | Final |
|---|---|---|---|---|---|---|---|---|---|---|---|---|
| Alberta (Sturmay) | 1 | 0 | 0 | 1 | 0 | 0 | 1 | 0 | 0 | 1 | 0 | 4 |
| British Columbia (Tardi) | 0 | 1 | 0 | 0 | 1 | 0 | 0 | 0 | 2 | 0 | 1 | 5 |

== Playoffs ==
| Semifinal | | | Final |
| | | | 1 | Northern Ontario | 4 |
| 2 | British Columbia | 9 | 2 | British Columbia | 8 |
| 3 | Manitoba | 8 |

=== Semifinal ===
Saturday, January 20, 18:00

| Team | 1 | 2 | 3 | 4 | 5 | 6 | 7 | 8 | 9 | 10 | Final |
|---|---|---|---|---|---|---|---|---|---|---|---|
| British Columbia (Tardi) | 0 | 0 | 3 | 0 | 2 | 0 | 0 | 2 | 0 | 2 | 9 |
| Manitoba (Ryan) | 0 | 0 | 0 | 2 | 0 | 3 | 1 | 0 | 2 | 0 | 8 |

Player percentages
| British Columbia | | Manitoba | |
|---|---|---|---|
| Zac Curtis | 84% | Brendan Bilawka | 84% |
| Jordan Tardi | 89% | Colin Kurz | 88% |
| Sterling Middleton | 95% | Jacques Gauthier | 80% |
| Tyler Tardi | 92% | J.T. Ryan | 84% |
| Total | 90% | Total | 84% |

=== Final ===
Sunday, January 21, 18:00

| Team | 1 | 2 | 3 | 4 | 5 | 6 | 7 | 8 | 9 | 10 | Final |
|---|---|---|---|---|---|---|---|---|---|---|---|
| Northern Ontario (Horgan) | 0 | 0 | 1 | 0 | 0 | 1 | 0 | 0 | 2 | 0 | 4 |
| British Columbia (Tardi) | 1 | 1 | 0 | 2 | 0 | 0 | 0 | 3 | 0 | 1 | 8 |

Player percentages
| Northern Ontario | | British Columbia | |
|---|---|---|---|
| Maxime Blais | 86% | Zac Curtis | 72% |
| Nicholas Bissonnette | 79% | Jordan Tardi | 90% |
| Jacob Horgan | 88% | Sterling Middleton | 94% |
| Tanner Horgan | 75% | Tyler Tardi | 99% |
| Total | 82% | Total | 89% |

2018 Canadian Junior Men's Curling Champions
(British Columbia)
British Columbia
6th Junior Men's National Championship title
