= Émile Asselin =

Canadian curler

- Curler
- Born: November 15, 1996 (age 29); Sainte-Agathe-des-Monts, Quebec

Team
- Curling club: Glenmore CC, Dollard-des-Ormeaux, QC
- Skip: Yannick Martel
- Third: Jean-François Charest
- Second: Émile Asselin
- Lead: Bradley Lequin

Curling career
- Member Association: Quebec (2013–2024; 2025–present); Ontario (2024–2025)
- Brier: 3 (2018, 2020, 2023)
- World Mixed Championship: 1 (2023)
- Top CTRS ranking: 14th (2022–23)
Medal record
Curling
Representing Canada
World Mixed Championship
| Bronze medal – third place | 2023 Aberdeen |

Émile Asselin (born November 15, 1996) is a Canadian curler from Montreal, Quebec. He currently plays second on Team Yannick Martel.

== Career ==
Playing lead for his brother Félix Asselin, Émile won back-to-back Quebec Junior Curling Championships in 2015 and 2016. The team had a strong showing at the 2015 Canadian Junior Curling Championships, qualifying for the championship pool with a 6–0 record. They then went 1–3 in the championship pool, qualifying for the tiebreaker. Team Asselin defeated Alberta in the tiebreaker before losing to Saskatchewan in the second, ultimately being eliminated. The team just missed the playoffs the following season, finishing tied for fourth place with a 6–4 record.

After Félix aged out of juniors, Émile joined the Alek Bédard rink out of Lacolle for his final two years of juniors. The team consisted of Bédard at skip, Louis Quevillon at third, Asselin at second and Bradley Lequin at lead. After failing to win the provincial championship in 2017, the team won the Quebec Junior Curling Championship in 2018. This qualified them for the 2018 Canadian Junior Curling Championships, held January 13–21 in Shawinigan, Quebec. At the championship, the team finished the round robin with a 4–2 record, which was enough to qualify them for the championship pool. They then lost three of their four games, finishing the tournament in seventh place with a 5–5 record.

In 2019, Émile played second on Félix's team at the 2019 Canadian Mixed Curling Championship, which also included Laurie St-Georges at third and Emily Riley at lead. The team finished on top of the standings after the championship pool with an 8–2 record before losing in the semifinal to Nova Scotia. They bounced back in the bronze medal game, defeating Ontario for the bronze medal.

After being the alternate for the Mike Fournier rink during the 2018–19 season, Asselin rejoined the Bédard rink for the 2019–20 season, Team Bédard competed in four tour events but only found success in one, the Challenge Casino de Charlevoix, where they reached the semifinals. At the 2020 Quebec Tankard, the team qualified for the championship round with a 5–1 record. They then went 2–1 in their next three games, good enough to earn them a spot in the 3 vs. 4 page playoff game. They then defeated Martin Ferland 9–8 in the 3 vs. 4 game, upset Mike Fournier 9–8 in the semifinal and beat Vincent Roberge 7–2 to claim the championship title. Their win earned them a berth to the 2020 Tim Hortons Brier in Kingston, Ontario. There, they finished with a 1–6 record, only managing to beat Team Nunavut.

Due to the COVID-19 pandemic in Quebec, the 2021 provincial championship was cancelled. Curling Québec then decided to select Team Fournier to represent Quebec at the 2021 Tim Hortons Brier, meaning Team Bédard would not have the opportunity to repeat as back-to-back provincials champions.

Team Bédard had a strong start to the 2021–22 season, reaching the final of the Moosehead Classic. They then won the Challenge Nord-Ouest Air Creebec, beating the Jean-Sébastien Roy rink in the final game. They had two more playoff appearances during the season at the Challenge Casino de Charlevoix and the Finale du Circuit where they reached the quarterfinals and semifinals respectively. The Quebec Tankard was once again cancelled due to the pandemic and the Fournier rink was appointed as the provinces representatives, ending Team Bédard's season. After the season, Mike Fournier moved to Ontario and Asselin joined the team which was taken over by his brother Félix. The team also included Martin Crête and Jean-François Trépanier.

Asselin won the 2022 Canadian Mixed Curling Championship as a member of his brother Félix's Quebec team. They went on to win the bronze medal at the world mixed curling championships in Aberdeen, Scotland, narrowly defeating Norway 4-3.

== Personal life ==
Asselin is currently a physiotherapy student at the Université de Montréal. His brother is Félix Asselin.

== Teams ==
| Season | Skip | Third | Second | Lead |
|---|---|---|---|---|
| 2013–14 | Félix Asselin | Alex Cormier | Lewis South | Émile Asselin |
| 2014–15 | Félix Asselin | Alex Cormier | Lewis South | Émile Asselin |
| 2015–16 | Félix Asselin | Nick den Hartog | Maxence Martel | Émile Asselin |
| 2016–17 | Alek Bédard | Louis Quevillon | Émile Asselin | Bradley Lequin |
| 2017–18 | Alek Bédard | Louis Quevillon | Émile Asselin | Bradley Lequin |
| 2019–20 | Alek Bédard | Louis Quevillon | Émile Asselin | Bradley Lequin |
| 2020–21 | Alek Bédard | Louis Quevillon | Émile Asselin | Bradley Lequin |
| 2021–22 | Alek Bédard | Louis Quevillon | Émile Asselin | Bradley Lequin |
| 2022–23 | Félix Asselin | Martin Crête | Émile Asselin | Jean-François Trépanier |
| 2023–24 | Félix Asselin | Martin Crête | Émile Asselin | Jean-François Trépanier |
| 2024–25 | Mike Fournier | Charlie Richard | Émile Asselin | Punit Sthankiya |
| 2025–26 | Yannick Martel | Jean-François Charest | Émile Asselin | Bradley Lequin |
