= 2023 Quebec Tankard =

Canadian curling championship

2023 Hardline Quebec Tankard
- Host city: Alma, Quebec
- Arena: Centre Sportif Mistouk d'Alma
- Dates: January 10–15
- Winner: Team Asselin
- Curling club: Glenmore CC, Dollard-des-Ormeaux, CS Belvédère, Val d'Or, CC Valleyfield, Salaberry-de-Valleyfield & CC Etchemin, Saint-Romuald
- Skip: Félix Asselin
- Third: Martin Crête
- Second: Émile Asselin
- Lead: Jean-François Trépanier
- Finalist: Vincent Roberge

The 2023 Hardline Quebec Tankard, the Quebec men's provincial curling championship, was held from January 10 to 15 at the Centre Sportif Mistouk d'Alma in Alma, Quebec. The event was held in conjunction with the 2023 Quebec Scotties Tournament of Hearts, Quebec's provincial women's curling championship.

The winning Félix Asselin rink represented Quebec at the 2023 Tim Hortons Brier, in London, Ontario where they finished fourth in Pool B with a 5–3 record missing the Championship round by one game.

The event has not been held since 2020 due to the COVID-19 pandemic in Quebec. The 2022 event was cancelled at the last minute.

== Teams ==
The teams are listed as follows:

Skip	Third	Second	Lead	Alternate	Club(s)
Félix Asselin	Martin Crête	Émile Asselin	Jean-François Trépanier		Glenmore/Belvédère/Valleyfield/Etchemin
Patrick Bédard	Sylvain Lelievre	Philippe Desjardins	Patrick Charron	Pascal Gagnon	Noranda
Sylvain Bellavance	André Bellavance	Stéphane Laforge	André Gagné		TMR/Belvédère/Boucherville
Gregory Bornais-Doucet	David Jutras	Samuel Bornais	Francois Bornais	Normand Bornais	Jacques-Cartier
Robert Desjardins	François Gionest	Pierre-Luc Morissette	René Dubois	Daniel Gilbert	Chicoutimi/Jacques-Cartier
Ghislain Doyon	Jean-Yves Lemay	Sylvain Decaire	Sylvain Allard		Belvédère/Amos
Richard Faguy	Robin Duguay	Eric Périard	Guillaume Boisvert		Buckingham
Léandre Girard	James Trahan	Jacob Labrecque	Xavier Guévin	Robert Richard	Victoria/Trois-Rivières
Pascal Girard	Mathieu Hamel	Mario Gagnon	Remi Savard		Chicoutimi
Francis Godin	Guillaume Rousseau	Jacob Thériault	Janick Thériault		Rivière-du-Loup
Frederic Lawton	Matthew Kennerknecht	David Miles	Charles Gagnon		Glenmore/Baie-d'Urfé
Alexandre Leduc	Francois Hallé	Nicolas Dumaresq	Martin Trépanier	David-Lee Amos	Valleyfield
Steven Munroe	Yannick Martel	Philippe Brassard	Jean-François Charest		Chicoutimi/Victoria/Etchemin
Benoit Gagné	Pierre Lajoie	Maxime Bilodeau	Mathieu Paquet (skip)		Jacques-Cartier
Vincent Roberge	Jean-Michel Arsenault	Jesse Mullen	Julien Tremblay		Etchemin/Victoria
Zackary Wise	Michael Solomon	Stewart Yaxley	Tyler Lachance	Adam Cartwright	Glenmore

== Knockout brackets ==
=== A event ===
First Knockout	Qualifier 1
Francis Godin	3
Félix Asselin	11
Félix Asselin	11
Zackary Wise	3
Zackary Wise	9
Sylvain Bellavance	8
Félix Asselin	8
Robert Desjardins	4
Léandre Girard	8
Frederic Lawton	4
Léandre Girard	5
Robert Desjardins	7
Richard Faguy	5
Robert Desjardins	9
Félix Asselin	7
Vincent Roberge	1
Steven Munroe	7
Patrick Bédard	3
Steven Munroe	5
Mathieu Paquet	10
Gregory Bornais-Doucet	6
Mathieu Paquet	9
Mathieu Paquet	7
Vincent Roberge	10
Alexandre Leduc	4
Ghislain Doyon	7
Ghislain Doyon	3
Vincent Roberge	8
Pascal Girard	2
Vincent Roberge	7

=== B event ===
Second Knockout	Qualifier 2
Vincent Roberge	8
Pascal Girard	3
Mathieu Paquet	6
Pascal Girard	8
Léandre Girard	6
Richard Faguy	4	Gregory Bornais-Doucet	5
Gregory Bornais-Doucet	9	Léandre Girard	7
Pascal Girard	8
Ghislain Doyon	5
Sylvain Bellavance	4	Pascal Girard	8
Pascal Girard	7	Pascal Girard	7
Alexandre Leduc	4
Robert Desjardins	6
Alexandre Leduc	7
Zackary Wise	3
Francis Godin	2	Alexandre Leduc	10
Alexandre Leduc	8	Alexandre Leduc	13
Patrick Bédard	4
Steven Munroe	7
Frederic Lawton	5	Patrick Bédard	9
Patrick Bédard	6

=== C event ===
Third knockout	Qualifier 3
Alexandre Leduc	10
Mathieu Paquet	8
Patrick Bédard	8
Frederic Lawton	7	Frederic Lawton	5
Ghislain Doyon	6	Patrick Bédard	1
Mathieu Paquet	10
Mathieu Paquet	7
Zackary Wise	7	Zackary Wise	4
Richard Faguy	2

Third knockout	Qualifier 4
Pascal Girard	2
Robert Desjardins	9
Robert Desjardins	7
Francis Godin	5	Gregory Bornais-Doucet	2
Gregory Bornais-Doucet	8	Robert Desjardins	11
Léandre Girard	6
Léandre Girard	8
Steven Munroe	9	Steven Munroe	4
Sylvain Bellavance	7

== Knockout results ==
All draw times are listed in Eastern Time (UTC-05:00).

=== Draw 1 ===
Tuesday, January 10, 9:30 am

Sheet A	1	2	3	4	5	6	7	8	9	10	Final
Francis Godin	0	1	0	0	1	0	1	0	X	X	3
Félix Asselin	2	0	2	1	0	3	0	3	X	X	11

Sheet B	1	2	3	4	5	6	7	8	9	10	Final
Zackary Wise	3	0	1	1	0	1	0	0	2	1	9
Sylvain Bellavance	0	2	0	0	1	0	4	1	0	0	8

Sheet C	1	2	3	4	5	6	7	8	9	10	Final
Léandre Girard	0	0	1	1	1	1	0	0	4	X	8
Frederic Lawton	2	0	0	0	0	0	1	1	0	X	4

Sheet D	1	2	3	4	5	6	7	8	9	10	Final
Richard Faguy	0	0	0	1	0	2	0	2	0	X	5
Robert Desjardins	0	1	1	0	3	0	2	0	2	X	9

=== Draw 2 ===
Tuesday, January 10, 2:00 pm

Sheet B	1	2	3	4	5	6	7	8	9	10	Final
Steven Munroe	0	1	1	0	1	0	1	0	0	3	7
Patrick Bédard	0	0	0	1	0	0	0	2	0	0	3

Sheet C	1	2	3	4	5	6	7	8	9	10	Final
Gregory Bornais-Doucet	0	2	0	2	0	0	2	0	0	X	6
Mathieu Paquet	2	0	1	0	2	2	0	1	1	X	9

Sheet D	1	2	3	4	5	6	7	8	9	10	Final
Alexandre Leduc	0	1	0	0	1	0	2	0	0	X	4
Ghislain Doyon	2	0	0	2	0	1	0	1	1	X	7

Sheet E	1	2	3	4	5	6	7	8	9	10	Final
Pascal Girard	0	0	0	1	0	1	0	0	X	X	2
Vincent Roberge	3	0	1	0	3	0	0	0	X	X	7

=== Draw 3 ===
Wednesday, January 11, 8:30 am

Sheet B	1	2	3	4	5	6	7	8	9	10	Final
Léandre Girard	0	1	2	0	1	1	0	0	0	0	5
Robert Desjardins	0	0	0	1	0	0	1	1	2	2	7

Sheet C	1	2	3	4	5	6	7	8	9	10	Final
Ghislain Doyon	0	0	1	0	1	0	1	0	0	X	3
Vincent Roberge	0	2	0	3	0	1	0	1	1	X	8

Sheet D	1	2	3	4	5	6	7	8	9	10	Final
Steven Munroe	0	0	1	0	2	0	2	0	X	X	5
Mathieu Paquet	2	2	0	2	0	2	0	2	X	X	10

Sheet E	1	2	3	4	5	6	7	8	9	10	Final
Félix Asselin	0	5	0	4	0	1	1	X	X	X	11
Zackary Wise	1	0	1	0	1	0	0	X	X	X	3

=== Draw 4 ===
Wednesday, January 11, 12:15 pm

Sheet A	1	2	3	4	5	6	7	8	9	10	Final
Richard Faguy	0	0	0	1	1	2	0	0	0	X	4
Gregory Bornais-Doucet	1	1	3	0	0	0	1	1	2	X	9

Sheet B	1	2	3	4	5	6	7	8	9	10	Final
Francis Godin	0	1	0	0	0	1	0	X	X	X	2
Alexandre Leduc	3	0	2	2	0	0	1	X	X	X	8

Sheet C	1	2	3	4	5	6	7	8	9	10	Final
Sylvain Bellavance	0	0	0	0	2	0	1	0	1	0	4
Pascal Girard	1	1	0	0	0	1	0	2	0	2	7

Sheet D	1	2	3	4	5	6	7	8	9	10	Final
Frederic Lawton	1	0	0	2	0	0	1	0	1	0	5
Patrick Bédard	0	0	1	0	0	1	0	2	0	2	6

=== Draw 5 ===
Wednesday, January 11, 4:00 pm

Sheet C	1	2	3	4	5	6	7	8	9	10	Final
Félix Asselin	0	1	0	0	3	0	4	0	X	X	8
Robert Desjardins	0	0	0	1	0	2	0	1	X	X	4

Sheet D	1	2	3	4	5	6	7	8	9	10	Final
Mathieu Paquet	1	1	0	4	0	0	0	1	0	X	7
Vincent Roberge	0	0	1	0	4	1	2	0	2	X	10

=== Draw 6 ===
Wednesday, January 11, 8:00 pm

Sheet A	1	2	3	4	5	6	7	8	9	10	Final
Steven Munroe	3	0	0	1	0	1	0	0	2	0	7
Patrick Bédard	0	0	4	0	1	0	0	3	0	1	9

Sheet B	1	2	3	4	5	6	7	8	9	10	Final
Ghislain Doyon	0	0	0	0	2	0	1	0	2	0	5
Pascal Girard	1	1	1	1	0	1	0	1	0	2	8

Sheet C	1	2	3	4	5	6	7	8	9	10	Final
Zackary Wise	0	1	0	1	0	1	0	0	X	X	3
Alexandre Leduc	1	0	4	0	1	0	3	1	X	X	10

Sheet E	1	2	3	4	5	6	7	8	9	10	11	Final
Léandre Girard	1	0	1	0	0	1	0	1	0	1	1	6
Gregory Bornais-Doucet	0	1	0	1	1	0	1	0	1	0	0	5

=== Draw 7 ===
Thursday, January 12, 8:30 am

Sheet B	1	2	3	4	5	6	7	8	9	10	Final
Zackary Wise	0	2	1	0	0	1	1	1	1	X	7
Richard Faguy	1	0	0	1	0	0	0	0	0	X	2

Sheet D	1	2	3	4	5	6	7	8	9	10	11	Final
Léandre Girard	0	0	0	1	1	1	0	3	0	1	0	7
Pascal Girard	0	3	2	0	0	0	1	0	1	0	1	8

Sheet E	1	2	3	4	5	6	7	8	9	10	Final
Alexandre Leduc	0	0	2	2	1	3	0	5	X	X	13
Patrick Bédard	0	1	0	0	0	0	3	0	X	X	4

=== Draw 8 ===
Thursday, January 12, 12:15 pm

Sheet B	1	2	3	4	5	6	7	8	9	10	Final
Félix Asselin	0	2	0	2	1	1	0	1	X	X	7
Vincent Roberge	0	0	1	0	0	0	0	0	X	X	1

=== Draw 9 ===
Thursday, January 12, 4:00 pm

Sheet A	1	2	3	4	5	6	7	8	9	10	Final
Francis Godin	1	0	0	0	0	1	0	3	0	X	5
Gregory Bornais-Doucet	0	1	1	0	2	0	2	0	2	X	8

Sheet B	1	2	3	4	5	6	7	8	9	10	Final
Steven Munroe	0	2	0	1	0	6	0	0	0	0	9
Sylvain Bellavance	0	0	1	0	1	0	2	1	1	1	7

Sheet C	1	2	3	4	5	6	7	8	9	10	Final
Mathieu Paquet	1	0	2	0	0	0	2	0	1	0	6
Pascal Girard	0	2	0	1	1	1	0	2	0	1	8

Sheet D	1	2	3	4	5	6	7	8	9	10	Final
Robert Desjardins	1	0	1	0	0	2	1	0	1	0	6
Alexandre Leduc	0	1	0	1	1	0	0	1	0	3	7

Sheet E	1	2	3	4	5	6	7	8	9	10	Final
Frederic Lawton	1	0	1	1	0	1	0	0	2	1	7
Ghislain Doyon	0	1	0	0	1	0	3	1	0	0	6

=== Draw 10 ===
Friday, January 13, 8:30 am

Sheet A	1	2	3	4	5	6	7	8	9	10	Final
Patrick Bédard	2	1	0	2	0	1	0	1	1	X	8
Frederic Lawton	0	0	2	0	3	0	0	0	0	X	5

Sheet B	1	2	3	4	5	6	7	8	9	10	Final
Pascal Girard	0	0	4	0	0	1	1	1	0	X	7
Alexandre Leduc	0	1	0	0	1	0	0	0	2	X	4

Sheet C	1	2	3	4	5	6	7	8	9	10	Final
Mathieu Paquet	0	1	0	0	0	1	0	0	3	2	7
Zackary Wise	1	0	0	1	0	0	1	1	0	0	4

Sheet D	1	2	3	4	5	6	7	8	9	10	Final
Robert Desjardins	1	0	0	2	1	0	0	3	X	X	7
Gregory Bornais-Doucet	0	1	0	0	0	0	1	0	X	X	2

Sheet E	1	2	3	4	5	6	7	8	9	10	Final
Léandre Girard	0	3	0	2	1	2	0	0	X	X	8
Steven Munroe	0	0	2	0	0	0	1	1	X	X	4

=== Draw 11 ===
Friday, January 13, 4:00 pm

Sheet A	1	2	3	4	5	6	7	8	9	10	Final
Robert Desjardins	0	3	0	1	0	5	0	1	1	X	11
Léandre Girard	1	0	3	0	1	0	1	0	0	X	6

Sheet C	1	2	3	4	5	6	7	8	9	10	Final
Vincent Roberge	2	1	0	1	1	1	0	2	X	X	8
Pascal Girard	0	0	1	0	0	0	2	0	X	X	3

Sheet D	1	2	3	4	5	6	7	8	9	10	Final
Patrick Bédard	0	0	0	1	0	X	X	X	X	X	1
Mathieu Paquet	3	4	1	0	2	X	X	X	X	X	10

=== Draw 12 ===
Saturday, January 14, 9:00 am

Sheet A	1	2	3	4	5	6	7	8	9	10	Final
Pascal Girard	0	0	0	0	0	1	0	1	X	X	2
Robert Desjardins	0	3	2	1	1	0	2	0	X	X	9

Sheet E	1	2	3	4	5	6	7	8	9	10	11	Final
Alexandre Leduc	2	0	2	0	0	1	0	0	3	0	2	10
Mathieu Paquet	0	1	0	3	1	0	0	1	0	2	0	8

== Playoffs ==
Page playoff system
A	Félix Asselin	4
B	Vincent Roberge	6
C1	Alexandre Leduc	8
C2	Robert Desjardins	9

Semifinal
A	Félix Asselin	9
C2	Robert Desjardins	5

Final
B	Vincent Roberge	6
A	Félix Asselin	12

=== A vs. B ===
Saturday, January 14, 2:00 pm

Sheet C	1	2	3	4	5	6	7	8	9	10	Final
Félix Asselin	1	0	1	0	0	0	2	0	0	0	4
Vincent Roberge	0	1	0	1	1	0	0	1	1	1	6

=== C1 vs. C2 ===
Saturday, January 14, 2:00 pm

Sheet B	1	2	3	4	5	6	7	8	9	10	Final
Alexandre Leduc	0	1	0	2	0	1	0	1	3	0	8
Robert Desjardins	0	0	5	0	2	0	1	0	0	1	9

=== Semifinal ===
Sunday, January 15, 10:00 am

Sheet C	1	2	3	4	5	6	7	8	9	10	Final
Félix Asselin	0	0	2	0	3	0	3	0	1	X	9
Robert Desjardins	0	0	0	1	0	3	0	1	0	X	5

=== Final ===
Sunday, January 15, 2:00 pm

Sheet C	1	2	3	4	5	6	7	8	9	10	Final
Vincent Roberge	0	0	3	0	0	3	0	0	X	X	6
Félix Asselin	1	1	0	3	0	0	5	2	X	X	12

2023 Quebec Tankard

Félix Asselin
2nd Quebec Provincial Championship title
