= 2020 Quebec Tankard =

Canadian curling championship

- Host city: Salaberry-de-Valleyfield
- Arena: Aréna de Salaberry
- Dates: January 19–26
- Winner: Team Bédard
- Curling club: Club de curling Boucherville, Boucherville; Glenmore Curling Club, Dollard-des-Ormeaux
- Skip: Alek Bédard
- Third: Louis Quevillon
- Second: Émile Asselin
- Lead: Bradley Lequin
- Coach: Daniel Bédard
- Finalist: Vincent Roberge

The 2020 Quebec Tankard the Quebec men's provincial curling championship was held from January 19 to 26 at the Arèna de Salaberry in Salaberry-de-Valleyfield, Quebec. The winning Alek Bédard rink represented Quebec at the 2020 Tim Hortons Brier in Kingston, Ontario and finished with a 1–6 record. The event was held in conjunction with the 2020 Quebec Scotties Tournament of Hearts, Quebec's provincial women's curling championship.

It is the third time in the last 11 years that Salaberry-de-Valleyfield played host to the provincial championships.

== Teams ==
Teams were as follows

Skip	Third	Second	Lead	Alternate	Club(s)
Robert Desjardins (Fourth)	Jean-Sébastien Roy (Skip)	Pierre-Luc Morissette	René Dubois	François Gionest	Des Collines/Chicoutimi/Victoria/Kénogami
Simon Hébert	Yannick Martel (skip)	Jean-François Charest	Marco Fortier	Stéphane Palin	Valleyfield/Kenogami
Mike Fournier	Félix Asselin	William Dion	Jean-François Trépanier	Philippe Ménard	Glenmore/Drummondville/Valleyfield
Alek Bédard	Louis Quevillon	Émile Asselin	Bradley Lequin		Boucherville/Glenmore
Martin Ferland	Richard Daneault	Don Bowser	Vincent Bourget		Grand-Mère/Etchemin/Des Collines/Trois-Rivières
Mark Homan	Mike McLean	Colton Daly	Gary Findley		Des Collines
Vincent Roberge	Jean-Michel Arsenault	Jesse Mullen	Julien Tremblay	Maxime Benoit	Etchemin/Kenogami/Rimouski
Steven Munroe	Maxime Elmaleh	Philippe Brassard	Jean Gagnon		Etchemin
John Stewart	Simon Benoit	Martin Trépanier	Pier-Luc Trépanier		Valleyfield/Aurèle-Racine
Steve Holdaway	Adam Freilich	Stewart Yaxley	Mike Chuipka	Adam Cartwright	Glenmore
Greg Balsdon	Jeffrey Stewart	Ian South	Christian Bouchard	François Gagné	Glenmore/TMR
Scott Hill	Scott McClintock	Shawn Blair	Shane McRae		Ormstown
Alexandre Leduc	François Hallé	Nicolas Dumaresq	David-Lee Amos	David Miles	Valleyfield/Baie d'Urfé
Alex Bérubé	Kevin Bleau	Daniel Grégoire	Simon Deveault	Erik Lachance	Mont-Bruno

== Preliminary round ==
=== Standings ===
Final round-robin standings

Key
Teams to Championship Round
Teams to Tiebreaker

Pool A	W	L
Fournier	5	1
Martel	4	2
Ferland	4	2
Munroe	4	2
Balsdon	3	3
Hill	1	5
Bérubé	0	6

Pool B	W	L
Roberge	6	0
Bédard	5	1
Leduc	3	3
Homan	3	3
Holdaway	2	4
Roy	2	4
Stewart	0	6

== Round-robin results ==
Scores

=== Draw 1 ===
Sunday, January 19, 20:30

Sheet A	1	2	3	4	5	6	7	8	9	10	Final
Steven Munroe	0	0	0	0	0	0	2	0	1	X	3
Martin Ferland	0	1	0	1	1	1	0	3	0	X	7

Sheet B	1	2	3	4	5	6	7	8	9	10	Final
Mike Fournier	1	1	0	3	2	2	0	1	X	X	10
Yannick Martel	0	0	1	0	0	0	1	0	X	X	2

Sheet C	1	2	3	4	5	6	7	8	9	10	Final
Jean-Sébastien Roy	1	0	0	2	1	0	2	3	X	X	9
John Stewart	0	1	0	0	0	1	0	0	X	X	2

Sheet E	1	2	3	4	5	6	7	8	9	10	11	Final
Alek Bédard	0	0	2	0	0	2	0	2	0	1	0	7
Vincent Roberge	0	2	0	0	3	0	2	0	0	0	1	8

=== Draw 2 ===
Monday, January 20 9:30

Sheet A	1	2	3	4	5	6	7	8	9	10	Final
Yannick Martel	2	0	0	3	0	3	0	2	X	X	10
Alex Bérubé	0	0	3	0	0	0	1	0	X	X	4

Sheet C	1	2	3	4	5	6	7	8	9	10	Final
Greg Balsdon	0	2	0	2	0	1	0	0	0	X	5
Mike Fournier	1	0	2	0	2	0	1	2	2	X	10

Sheet D	1	2	3	4	5	6	7	8	9	10	Final
Scott Hill	0	0	1	0	2	0	0	0	2	0	5
Martin Ferland	0	1	0	2	0	0	0	4	0	0	7

Sheet E	1	2	3	4	5	6	7	8	9	10	Final
Mark Homan	1	0	1	3	3	1	1	X	X	X	10
Jean-Sébastien Roy	0	1	0	0	0	0	0	X	X	X	1

=== Draw 3 ===
Monday, January 20, 14:30

Sheet A	1	2	3	4	5	6	7	8	9	10	Final
Steve Holdaway	0	0	0	0	1	0	0	2	0	0	3
Vincent Roberge	0	1	1	1	0	1	2	0	1	0	7

Sheet B	1	2	3	4	5	6	7	8	9	10	Final
Alex Bérubé	0	2	0	2	0	0	0	1	0	X	5
Martin Ferland	2	0	3	0	2	0	0	0	1	X	8

Sheet D	1	2	3	4	5	6	7	8	9	10	Final
Greg Balsdon	1	1	0	0	2	1	0	2	0	1	8
Scott Hill	0	0	4	1	0	0	0	0	2	0	7

Sheet E	1	2	3	4	5	6	7	8	9	10	Final
Alexandre Leduc	0	2	0	2	1	0	0	0	4	X	9
John Stewart	0	0	1	0	0	1	0	1	0	X	3

=== Draw 4 ===
Monday, January 20, 19:30

Sheet A	1	2	3	4	5	6	7	8	9	10	Final
Vincent Roberge	0	0	0	0	0	0	0	1	1	2	4
Alexandre Leduc	0	0	0	0	0	1	1	0	0	0	2

Sheet C	1	2	3	4	5	6	7	8	9	10	Final
Mark Homan	1	1	0	1	0	1	2	0	1	X	7
Steve Holdaway	0	0	1	0	1	0	0	1	0	X	3

Sheet D	1	2	3	4	5	6	7	8	9	10	Final
Jean-Sébastien Roy	0	1	1	0	0	1	0	1	0	0	4
Alek Bédard	1	0	0	1	1	0	0	0	2	1	6

Sheet E	1	2	3	4	5	6	7	8	9	10	Final
Mike Fournier	1	0	2	0	0	3	0	1	0	0	7
Steven Munroe	0	1	0	1	2	0	1	0	2	1	8

=== Draw 5 ===
Tuesday, January 21, 8:15

Sheet B	1	2	3	4	5	6	7	8	9	10	Final
Scott Hill	0	1	2	0	0	1	0	2	0	X	6
Steven Munroe	3	0	0	2	2	0	2	0	1	X	10

Sheet C	1	2	3	4	5	6	7	8	9	10	Final
Greg Balsdon	0	2	1	2	0	3	0	3	X	X	11
Alex Bérubé	2	0	0	0	2	0	1	0	X	X	5

Sheet D	1	2	3	4	5	6	7	8	9	10	Final
Martin Ferland	1	1	0	0	2	0	0	1	1	1	7
Yannick Martel	0	0	2	1	0	0	5	0	0	0	8

=== Draw 6 ===
Tuesday, January 21, 12:45

Sheet A	1	2	3	4	5	6	7	8	9	10	Final
Jean-Sébastien Roy	2	0	0	0	0	3	0	2	0	X	7
Steve Holdaway	0	1	1	1	1	0	2	0	3	X	9

Sheet B	1	2	3	4	5	6	7	8	9	10	Final
John Stewart	0	2	0	1	0	1	0	0	0	0	4
Mark Homan	1	0	1	0	1	0	2	1	0	1	7

Sheet D	1	2	3	4	5	6	7	8	9	10	Final
Alexandre Leduc	1	0	0	0	1	0	0	X	X	X	2
Alek Bédard	0	2	1	4	0	3	1	X	X	X	11

=== Draw 7 ===
Tuesday, January 21, 15:45

Sheet A	1	2	3	4	5	6	7	8	9	10	Final
Scott Hill	0	1	0	1	0	X	X	X	X	X	2
Mike Fournier	1	0	4	0	4	X	X	X	X	X	9

Sheet D	1	2	3	4	5	6	7	8	9	10	Final
Alex Bérubé	2	0	2	1	0	0	0	1	0	0	6
Steven Munroe	0	1	0	0	3	1	0	0	0	2	7

Sheet E	1	2	3	4	5	6	7	8	9	10	Final
Yannick Martel	0	0	1	0	0	X	X	X	X	X	1
Greg Balsdon	3	3	0	3	2	X	X	X	X	X	11

=== Draw 8 ===
Tuesday, January 21, 19:30

Sheet A	1	2	3	4	5	6	7	8	9	10	Final
Mark Homan	0	0	0	1	0	X	X	X	X	X	1
Alexandre Leduc	1	3	3	0	1	X	X	X	X	X	8

Sheet B	1	2	3	4	5	6	7	8	9	10	Final
Steve Holdaway	0	0	1	0	3	0	1	0	1	0	6
Alek Bédard	1	0	0	1	0	2	0	1	0	2	7

Sheet C	1	2	3	4	5	6	7	8	9	10	Final
Vincent Roberge	0	0	0	3	0	4	0	2	X	X	9
John Stewart	0	1	1	0	1	0	1	0	X	X	4

=== Draw 9 ===
Wednesday, January 22, 8:15

Sheet A	1	2	3	4	5	6	7	8	9	10	Final
John Stewart	0	4	0	1	0	0	1	0	1	X	7
Alek Bédard	2	0	3	0	2	1	0	2	0	X	10

Sheet C	1	2	3	4	5	6	7	8	9	10	Final
Alexandre Leduc	0	1	0	0	0	0	0	0	0	X	1
Jean-Sébastien Roy	3	0	0	1	0	1	0	1	1	X	7

Sheet D	1	2	3	4	5	6	7	8	9	10	11	Final
Vincent Roberge	1	0	3	1	0	0	0	2	0	0	1	8
MarK Homan	0	2	0	0	0	2	1	0	1	1	0	7

=== Draw 10 ===
Wednesday, January 22, 12:00

Sheet A	1	2	3	4	5	6	7	8	9	10	Final
Martin Ferland	0	0	2	0	1	2	0	4	1	X	10
Greg Balsdon	0	4	0	2	0	0	1	0	0	X	7

Sheet D	1	2	3	4	5	6	7	8	9	10	Final
Mike Fournier	1	2	0	2	2	0	X	X	X	X	7
Alex Bérubé	0	0	1	0	0	1	X	X	X	X	2

Sheet E	1	2	3	4	5	6	7	8	9	10	Final
Steven Munroe	1	0	1	0	0	1	1	1	0	X	5
Yannick Martel	0	2	0	2	3	0	0	0	3	X	10

=== Draw 11 ===
Wednesday, January 22, 15:45

Sheet B	1	2	3	4	5	6	7	8	9	10	Final
Jean-Sébastien Roy	0	2	0	0	0	0	X	X	X	X	2
Vincent Roberge	3	0	1	2	2	2	X	X	X	X	10

Sheet C	1	2	3	4	5	6	7	8	9	10	Final
Alek Bédard	0	7	2	0	1	X	X	X	X	X	10
Mark Homan	1	0	0	2	0	X	X	X	X	X	3

Sheet E	1	2	3	4	5	6	7	8	9	10	Final
John Stewart	2	1	0	2	0	0	0	0	0	1	6
Steve Holdaway	0	0	1	0	2	1	1	2	0	0	7

=== Draw 12 ===
Wednesday, January 22, 19:30

Sheet B	1	2	3	4	5	6	7	8	9	10	Final
Yannick Martel	1	0	2	0	3	2	0	0	2	X	10
Scott Hill	0	3	0	2	0	0	2	0	0	X	7

Sheet C	1	2	3	4	5	6	7	8	9	10	Final
Steven Munroe	0	0	2	0	0	1	0	2	0	2	7
Greg Balsdon	0	1	0	2	1	0	1	0	0	0	5

Sheet E	1	2	3	4	5	6	7	8	9	10	Final
Martin Ferland	0	1	0	1	0	0	2	1	0	X	5
Mike Fournier	1	0	1	0	2	1	0	0	6	X	11

=== Draw 13 ===
Thursday, January 23, 9:30

Sheet D	1	2	3	4	5	6	7	8	9	10	Final
Steve Holdaway	0	1	0	0	2	0	2	0	X	X	5
Alexandre Leduc	1	0	3	2	0	2	0	3	X	X	11

Sheet E	1	2	3	4	5	6	7	8	9	10	Final
Alex Bérubé	0	2	1	0	1	0	0	0	1	0	5
Scott Hill	1	0	0	1	0	1	1	1	0	1	6

=== Tiebreakers ===
Thursday, January 23, 14:30

Sheet B	1	2	3	4	5	6	7	8	Final
Alexandre Leduc	1	0	0	1	0	1	0	X	3
Mark Homan	0	1	0	0	1	0	6	X	8

Sheet D	1	2	3	4	5	6	7	8	Final
Steven Munroe	0	2	0	1	0	0	1	0	4
Martin Ferland	2	0	2	0	0	0	0	1	5

== Championship round ==
=== Standings ===
Final Standings

Key
Teams to Playoffs

Skip	W	L
Roberge	8	1
Fournier	7	2
Bédard	7	2
Ferland	6	3
Homan	4	5
Martel	4	5

=== Scores ===
==== Draw 15 ====
Thursday, January 23, 19:30

Sheet A	1	2	3	4	5	6	7	8	9	10	11	Final
Yannick Martel	0	0	2	2	1	0	0	0	0	1	0	6
Alek Bédard	0	1	0	0	0	2	1	2	0	0	1	7

Sheet B	1	2	3	4	5	6	7	8	9	10	Final
Mike Fournier	1	0	1	0	2	0	2	1	4	X	11
Mark Homan	0	2	0	2	0	1	0	0	0	X	5

Sheet C	1	2	3	4	5	6	7	8	9	10	Final
Martin Ferland	2	1	1	1	0	1	0	0	0	1	7
Vincent Roberge	0	0	0	0	4	0	1	0	1	0	6

==== Draw 17 ====
Friday, January 24, 14:30

Sheet A	1	2	3	4	5	6	7	8	9	10	Final
Martin Ferland	0	0	2	0	4	1	3	X	X	X	10
Mark Homan	0	3	0	1	0	0	0	X	X	X	4

Sheet D	1	2	3	4	5	6	7	8	9	10	Final
Vincent Roberge	0	1	0	2	2	0	1	0	2	X	8
Yannick Martel	0	0	1	0	0	2	0	1	0	X	4

Sheet E	1	2	3	4	5	6	7	8	9	10	Final
Alek Bédard	1	0	0	0	1	0	2	0	2	X	6
Mike Fournier	0	3	1	1	0	1	0	2	0	X	8

==== Draw 18 ====
Friday, January 24, 19:30

Sheet A	1	2	3	4	5	6	7	8	9	10	Final
Vincent Roberge	2	2	0	0	1	0	0	2	2	X	9
Mike Fournier	0	0	0	0	0	2	1	0	0	X	3

Sheet D	1	2	3	4	5	6	7	8	9	10	Final
Alek Bédard	1	0	0	2	1	0	2	3	X	X	9
Martin Ferland	0	1	0	0	0	3	0	0	X	X	4

Team	1	2	3	4	5	6	7	8	9	10	Final
Yannick Martel	1	0	1	0	0	X	X	X	X	X	2
Mark Homan	0	3	0	3	3	X	X	X	X	X	9

== Playoffs ==
Page playoff system
1	Vincent Roberge	7
2	Mike Fournier	2
3	Alek Bédard	9
4	Martin Ferland	8

Semifinal
2	Mike Fournier	8
3	Alek Bédard	9

Final
1	Vincent Roberge	2
3	Alek Bédard	7

=== 1 vs. 2 ===
Saturday, January 25, 15:00

Sheet B	1	2	3	4	5	6	7	8	9	10	Final
Vincent Roberge	0	1	2	0	0	1	0	1	2	X	7
Mike Fournier	0	0	0	1	0	0	1	0	0	X	2

=== 3 vs. 4 ===
Saturday, January 25, 15:00

Sheet D	1	2	3	4	5	6	7	8	9	10	11	Final
Alek Bédard	2	0	0	1	0	1	2	1	0	1	1	9
Martin Ferland	0	3	2	0	1	0	0	0	2	0	0	8

=== Semifinal ===
Saturday, January 25, 20:00

Sheet C	1	2	3	4	5	6	7	8	9	10	Final
Mike Fournier	3	0	1	0	1	0	2	0	1	0	8
Alek Bédard	0	3	0	3	0	1	0	0	0	2	9

=== Final ===
Sunday, January 26, 13:30

Sheet C	1	2	3	4	5	6	7	8	9	10	Final
Vincent Roberge	1	0	0	1	0	0	0	0	0	X	2
Alek Bédard	0	0	2	0	3	1	0	0	1	X	7

2020 Québec Tankard
(Quebec)
Alek Bédard
1st Québec Provincial Championship title
