= 2020 Tim Hortons Brier =

- Host city: Kingston, Ontario
- Arena: Leon's Centre
- Dates: February 29 – March 8
- Attendance: 96,076
- Winner: Newfoundland and Labrador
- Curling club: St. John's Curling Club, St. John's
- Skip: Brad Gushue
- Third: Mark Nichols
- Second: Brett Gallant
- Lead: Geoff Walker
- Alternate: Jeff Thomas
- Coach: Jules Owchar
- Finalist: Alberta (Brendan Bottcher)

The 2020 Tim Hortons Brier, Canada's national men's curling championship, was held from February 29 to March 8 at the Leon's Centre in Kingston, Ontario. The winning Brad Gushue rink was scheduled to represent Canada at the 2020 World Men's Curling Championship at the Commonwealth Arena in Glasgow, Scotland.

Newfoundland and Labrador's Brad Gushue rink won their third Brier Tankard by defeating Alberta's Brendan Bottcher rink 7–3 in the final. Gushue won the Tankard in 2017 and 2018. Bottcher finished runner-up in the past two Briers as well, losing to Gushue in 2018 and Kevin Koe in 2019.

On Tuesday, March 3, Saskatchewan skip Matt Dunstone curled two perfect games in the same day (Draws 10 and 11) against higher ranked teams Ontario (John Epping) and Canada (Kevin Koe). It was the first time a curler curled two perfect games in the same day in Canadian Men's Curling Championship history.

At the end of the Championship pool round on Friday March 6, four teams were tied for the fourth place berth in the playoffs, requiring three tiebreaker games to determine the final team eligible for the playoff round.

== Teams ==
Canada	Alberta	British Columbia	Manitoba
The Glencoe Club, Calgary Skip: Kevin Koe; Third: B.J. Neufeld; Second: Colton Flasch; Lead: Ben Hebert (Note: Team Canada's alternate Ted Appelman threw lead stones for the last two ends of Draw 8.); Alternate: Ted Appelman	Saville SC, Edmonton Skip: Brendan Bottcher; Third: Darren Moulding; Second: Brad Thiessen; Lead: Karrick Martin (Note: Team Alberta's alternate Pat Janssen threw lead stones for the second half of Draw 13.); Alternate: Pat Janssen	Vernon CC, Vernon & Kelowna CC, Kelowna Fourth: Jim Cotter; Skip: Steve Laycock; Second: Andrew Nerpin; Lead: Rick Sawatsky; Alternate: Brad Wood	Morris CC, Morris Skip: Jason Gunnlaugson; Third: Alex Forrest; Second: Adam Casey; Lead: Connor Njegovan
New Brunswick	Newfoundland and Labrador	Northern Ontario	Nova Scotia
Gage Golf & CC, Oromocto Skip: James Grattan; Third: Paul Dobson; Second: Andy McCann; Lead: Jamie Brannen; Alternate: Chris Jeffrey	St. John's CC, St. John's Skip: Brad Gushue; Third: Mark Nichols; Second: Brett Gallant (Note: For the last end of Draw 13, Newfoundland and Labrador alternate Jeff Thomas threw lead stones, Geoff Walker threw second stones and Brett Gallant sat out.); Lead: Geoff Walker (Note: Team Newfoundland and Labrador's alternate Jeff Thomas threw lead stones for the last two ends of Draw 9.); Alternate: Jeff Thomas	Community First CC, Sault Ste. Marie Skip: Brad Jacobs; Third: Marc Kennedy (Note: For the last two ends of Draw 13, Team Northern Ontario's alternate Lee Toner threw second stones, E.J. Harnden threw third stones and Marc Kennedy sat out.); Second: E.J. Harnden; Lead: Ryan Harnden; Alternate: Lee Toner	Halifax CC, Halifax Skip: Jamie Murphy; Third: Paul Flemming; Second: Scott Saccary (Note: Team Nova Scotia's alternate Kevin Ouellette threw second stones for the last two ends of Draw 7.); Lead: Phil Crowell; Alternate: Kevin Ouellette
Ontario	Prince Edward Island	Quebec	Saskatchewan
Leaside CC, Toronto Skip: John Epping; Third: Ryan Fry (Note: Team Ontario's alternate John Morris threw third stones for the last two ends of the second tiebreaker.); Second: Mat Camm; Lead: Brent Laing; Alternate: John Morris	Cornwall CC, Cornwall Skip: Bryan Cochrane; Third: Ian MacAulay; Second: Morgan Currie; Lead: Mark O'Rourke	CC Lacolle, Lacolle, CC Boucherville, Boucherville, & Glenmore CC, Dollard-des-Ormeaux Skip: Alek Bédard; Third: Louis Quevillon; Second: Émile Asselin (Note: For the last three ends of Draw 13, Team Quebec's alternate Daniel Bédard threw lead stones, Bradley Lequin threw second stones and Émile Asselin sat out.); Lead: Bradley Lequin; Alternate: Daniel Bédard	Highland CC, Regina Skip: Matt Dunstone; Third: Braeden Moskowy; Second: Catlin Schneider; Lead: Dustin Kidby
Northwest Territories	Nunavut	Yukon	(Manitoba) Wild Card
(Note: For the last three ends of Draw 7, Team Northwest Territories rotated their lineup.)Yellowknife CC, Yellowknife Skip: Jamie Koe; Third: David Aho; Second: Shadrach Mcleod; Lead: Cole Parsons; Alternate: Matt Ng	(Note: Team Nunavut used a five-player rotation.)Iqaluit CC, Iqaluit Skip: Jake Higgs; Third: Dale Kohlenberg; Second: Christian Smitheram; Lead: Ed MacDonald; Alternate: Sheldon Wettig	Whitehorse CC, Whitehorse Skip: Thomas Scoffin; Third: Trygg Jensen; Second: Brett Winfield; Lead: Joe Wallingham	West St. Paul CC, West St. Paul Skip: Mike McEwen; Third: Reid Carruthers; Second: Derek Samagalski; Lead: Colin Hodgson

=== CTRS ranking ===
Member Association (Skip)	Rank	Points
Northern Ontario (Jacobs)	1	460.082
Ontario (Epping)	2	438.074
Newfoundland and Labrador (Gushue)	3	320.844
(Manitoba) Wild Card (McEwen)	4	311.649
Alberta (Bottcher)	5	297.971
Canada (K. Koe)	6	256.585
Manitoba (Gunnlaugson)	7	230.031
Saskatchewan (Dunstone)	8	210.559
Nova Scotia (Murphy)	20	114.256
British Columbia (Laycock)	23	96.552
New Brunswick (Grattan)	49	55.748
Quebec (Bédard)	68	38.394
Prince Edward Island (Cochrane)	89	26.684
Northwest Territories (J. Koe)	NR	0.000
Nunavut (Higgs)	NR	0.000
Yukon (Scoffin)	NR	0.000

=== Wild card game ===
A wild card play-in game was played on February 28. It was contested between the top two teams on the Canadian Team Ranking System standings who did not win their respective provincial championships: the West St. Paul Curling Club's Mike McEwen rink from West St. Paul, Manitoba; and the Penetanguishene Curling Club's Glenn Howard rink from Penetanguishene, Ontario. Team Wild Card entered the Brier as the number 3 seed.

CTRS standings for wild card game

Rank	Team	Member Association	Eligibility
1	~~Brad Jacobs~~	Northern Ontario	Won Provincials
2	~~John Epping~~	Ontario	Won Provincials
3	~~Brad Gushue~~	Newfoundland and Labrador	Won Provincials
4	Mike McEwen	Manitoba	Eliminated from Provincials
5	~~Brendan Bottcher~~	Alberta	Won Provincials
6	~~Kevin Koe~~	Alberta	Qualified as Team Canada (ineligible)
7	~~Jason Gunnlaugson~~	Manitoba	Won Provincials
8	~~Matt Dunstone~~	Saskatchewan	Won Provincials
9	Glenn Howard	Ontario	Eliminated from Provincials

Wild card Game

Friday, February 28, 7:00 pm

Sheet B	1	2	3	4	5	6	7	8	9	10	Final
(Manitoba) Mike McEwen 🔨	0	1	0	1	0	0	0	2	0	1	5
(Ontario) Glenn Howard	0	0	2	0	1	0	0	0	1	0	4

Player percentages
(Manitoba) Team McEwen		(Ontario) Team Howard	
Colin Hodgson	88%	Tim March	94%
Derek Samagalski	84%	David Mathers	95%
Reid Carruthers	85%	Scott Howard	93%
Mike McEwen	91%	Glenn Howard	80%
Total	87%	Total	90%

== Map of teams ==
Team Canada Provincial Winners Wild-Card Team

== Round-robin standings ==
Final round-robin standings

Key
Teams to Championship Pool

Pool A	Skip	W	L	PF	PA	EW	EL	BE	SE	S%
(Manitoba) Wild Card	Mike McEwen	6	1	53	30	32	19	8	9	91%
Saskatchewan	Matt Dunstone	6	1	51	32	27	24	10	4	87%
Canada	Kevin Koe	5	2	44	24	26	20	6	8	89%
Ontario	John Epping	4	3	52	44	27	28	3	5	84%
New Brunswick	James Grattan	3	4	42	50	29	30	2	7	79%
British Columbia	Steve Laycock	2	5	34	52	24	28	6	4	78%
Northwest Territories	Jamie Koe	2	5	36	49	24	29	6	4	77%
Yukon	Thomas Scoffin	0	7	35	66	22	33	5	3	75%

Pool B	Skip	W	L	PF	PA	EW	EL	BE	SE	S%
Alberta	Brendan Bottcher	7	0	48	25	25	19	11	6	86%
Newfoundland and Labrador	Brad Gushue	6	1	50	30	26	20	7	6	89%
Manitoba	Jason Gunnlaugson	5	2	55	48	33	28	4	7	83%
Northern Ontario	Brad Jacobs	4	3	44	29	23	18	6	6	90%
Nova Scotia	Jamie Murphy	3	4	41	35	24	25	9	5	83%
Prince Edward Island	Bryan Cochrane	2	5	42	54	26	26	4	7	80%
Quebec	Alek Bédard	1	6	31	57	23	32	5	4	76%
Nunavut	Jake Higgs	0	7	27	60	20	30	6	3	66%

== Round-robin results ==
All draw times are listed in Eastern Time Zone (UTC−05:00).

=== Draw 1 ===
Saturday, February 29, 2:00 pm

Sheet A	1	2	3	4	5	6	7	8	9	10	Final
Northwest Territories (J. Koe)	0	1	0	1	0	2	0	0	0	0	4
British Columbia (Laycock) 🔨	2	0	0	0	2	0	0	1	0	1	6

Sheet B	1	2	3	4	5	6	7	8	9	10	Final
Ontario (Epping)	0	1	0	0	2	0	0	1	0	1	5
Canada (K. Koe) 🔨	0	0	1	1	0	1	0	0	0	0	3

Sheet C	1	2	3	4	5	6	7	8	9	10	Final
Newfoundland and Labrador (Gushue) 🔨	0	2	2	1	0	0	3	0	X	X	8
Manitoba (Gunnlaugson)	0	0	0	0	2	1	0	1	X	X	4

Sheet D	1	2	3	4	5	6	7	8	9	10	Final
Quebec (Bédard)	0	0	0	1	0	1	0	1	0	X	3
Nova Scotia (Murphy) 🔨	0	0	1	0	3	0	2	0	4	X	10

=== Draw 2 ===
Saturday, February 29, 7:00 pm

Sheet A	1	2	3	4	5	6	7	8	9	10	Final
Northern Ontario (Jacobs)	0	0	0	0	1	0	1	0	X	X	2
Alberta (Bottcher) 🔨	0	0	0	3	0	2	0	2	X	X	7

Sheet B	1	2	3	4	5	6	7	8	9	10	Final
Nunavut (Higgs) 🔨	0	0	0	0	2	0	2	0	X	X	4
Prince Edward Island (Cochrane)	0	0	1	1	0	5	0	2	X	X	9

Sheet C	1	2	3	4	5	6	7	8	9	10	Final
Saskatchewan (Dunstone)	0	0	1	0	0	0	1	0	1	0	3
(Manitoba) Wild Card (McEwen) 🔨	0	1	0	0	1	1	0	1	0	1	5

Sheet D	1	2	3	4	5	6	7	8	9	10	Final
Yukon (Scoffin)	0	0	1	2	0	2	0	3	0	0	8
New Brunswick (Grattan) 🔨	2	0	0	0	1	0	2	0	2	2	9

=== Draw 3 ===
Sunday, March 1, 9:00 am

Sheet A	1	2	3	4	5	6	7	8	9	10	Final
(Manitoba) Wild Card (McEwen) 🔨	0	2	0	4	1	0	2	0	1	X	10
Yukon (Scoffin)	0	0	2	0	0	2	0	2	0	X	6

Sheet B	1	2	3	4	5	6	7	8	9	10	Final
Saskatchewan (Dunstone)	0	0	1	0	1	1	2	0	3	2	10
New Brunswick (Grattan) 🔨	2	1	0	2	0	0	0	1	0	0	6

Sheet C	1	2	3	4	5	6	7	8	9	10	Final
Prince Edward Island (Cochrane) 🔨	1	0	0	0	0	0	0	1	0	X	2
Northern Ontario (Jacobs)	0	0	0	2	1	0	0	0	3	X	6

Sheet D	1	2	3	4	5	6	7	8	9	10	Final
Nunavut (Higgs)	0	0	1	1	0	2	0	0	X	X	4
Alberta (Bottcher) 🔨	3	0	0	0	3	0	0	3	X	X	9

=== Draw 4 ===
Sunday, March 1, 2:00 pm

Sheet A	1	2	3	4	5	6	7	8	9	10	Final
Manitoba (Gunnlaugson)	0	0	0	4	1	0	1	0	2	2	10
Quebec (Bédard) 🔨	1	1	2	0	0	2	0	2	0	0	8

Sheet B	1	2	3	4	5	6	7	8	9	10	Final
Newfoundland and Labrador (Gushue) 🔨	0	2	0	0	0	1	0	1	0	1	5
Nova Scotia (Murphy)	0	0	0	0	1	0	0	0	1	0	2

Sheet C	1	2	3	4	5	6	7	8	9	10	Final
Canada (K. Koe) 🔨	2	1	0	2	0	0	2	0	X	X	7
Northwest Territories (J. Koe)	0	0	1	0	0	1	0	1	X	X	3

Sheet D	1	2	3	4	5	6	7	8	9	10	Final
Ontario (Epping)	0	2	0	1	0	4	2	2	X	X	11
British Columbia (Laycock) 🔨	1	0	1	0	1	0	0	0	X	X	3

=== Draw 5 ===
Sunday, March 1, 7:00 pm

Sheet A	1	2	3	4	5	6	7	8	9	10	Final
New Brunswick (Grattan)	0	2	0	1	0	0	0	1	X	X	4
Canada (K. Koe) 🔨	1	0	3	0	0	2	2	0	X	X	8

Sheet B	1	2	3	4	5	6	7	8	9	10	Final
Yukon (Scoffin) 🔨	1	0	1	0	2	0	0	2	0	X	6
Ontario (Epping)	0	2	0	4	0	0	1	0	3	X	10

Sheet C	1	2	3	4	5	6	7	8	9	10	Final
Alberta (Bottcher)	0	0	0	1	0	0	0	0	0	2	3
Newfoundland and Labrador (Gushue) 🔨	0	1	0	0	0	1	0	0	0	0	2

Sheet D	1	2	3	4	5	6	7	8	9	10	Final
Northern Ontario (Jacobs)	0	1	0	1	0	3	0	0	0	0	5
Manitoba (Gunnlaugson) 🔨	2	0	1	0	1	0	0	0	0	2	6

=== Draw 6 ===
Monday, March 2, 9:00 am

Sheet A	1	2	3	4	5	6	7	8	9	10	Final
Nova Scotia (Murphy) 🔨	0	2	2	2	0	1	1	3	X	X	11
Prince Edward Island (Cochrane)	1	0	0	0	1	0	0	0	X	X	2

Sheet B	1	2	3	4	5	6	7	8	9	10	Final
Quebec (Bédard) 🔨	2	1	1	0	0	1	0	2	0	X	7
Nunavut (Higgs)	0	0	0	1	1	0	1	0	1	X	4

Sheet C	1	2	3	4	5	6	7	8	9	10	Final
British Columbia (Laycock)	0	1	0	0	0	3	2	0	2	0	8
Saskatchewan (Dunstone) 🔨	2	0	0	0	2	0	0	1	0	4	9

Sheet D	1	2	3	4	5	6	7	8	9	10	Final
Northwest Territories (J. Koe)	0	0	1	0	0	1	0	0	0	X	2
(Manitoba) Wild Card (McEwen) 🔨	0	1	0	1	0	0	2	1	1	X	6

=== Draw 7 ===
Monday, March 2, 2:00 pm

Sheet A	1	2	3	4	5	6	7	8	9	10	Final
Saskatchewan (Dunstone) 🔨	2	0	0	0	3	0	0	1	X	X	6
Northwest Territories (J. Koe)	0	1	0	0	0	0	1	0	X	X	2

Sheet B	1	2	3	4	5	6	7	8	9	10	Final
(Manitoba) Wild Card (McEwen) 🔨	2	0	2	1	0	4	0	1	X	X	10
British Columbia (Laycock)	0	1	0	0	2	0	2	0	X	X	5

Sheet C	1	2	3	4	5	6	7	8	9	10	Final
Nunavut (Higgs)	0	1	0	1	0	0	0	1	1	X	4
Nova Scotia (Murphy) 🔨	2	0	1	0	3	0	1	0	0	X	7

Sheet D	1	2	3	4	5	6	7	8	9	10	Final
Prince Edward Island (Cochrane) 🔨	1	0	0	1	0	0	1	0	2	2	7
Quebec (Bédard)	0	0	1	0	0	1	0	2	0	0	4

=== Draw 8 ===
Monday, March 2, 7:00 pm

Sheet A	1	2	3	4	5	6	7	8	9	10	Final
Newfoundland and Labrador (Gushue)	0	3	0	0	2	0	0	0	0	2	7
Northern Ontario (Jacobs) 🔨	4	0	1	0	0	0	0	1	0	0	6

Sheet B	1	2	3	4	5	6	7	8	9	10	11	Final
Manitoba (Gunnlaugson) 🔨	0	1	0	1	0	0	2	1	0	1	0	6
Alberta (Bottcher)	0	0	2	0	3	1	0	0	0	0	1	7

Sheet C	1	2	3	4	5	6	7	8	9	10	Final
Ontario (Epping) 🔨	1	0	0	0	0	0	2	0	1	0	4
New Brunswick (Grattan)	0	2	0	1	1	1	0	1	0	1	7

Sheet D	1	2	3	4	5	6	7	8	9	10	Final
Canada (K. Koe) 🔨	2	2	1	1	0	1	3	0	X	X	10
Yukon (Scoffin)	0	0	0	0	1	0	0	1	X	X	2

=== Draw 9 ===
Tuesday, March 3, 9:00 am

Sheet A	1	2	3	4	5	6	7	8	9	10	Final
British Columbia (Laycock) 🔨	0	1	0	0	0	1	0	0	1	0	3
New Brunswick (Grattan)	2	0	1	0	0	0	0	1	0	2	6

Sheet B	1	2	3	4	5	6	7	8	9	10	Final
Northwest Territories (J. Koe) 🔨	0	2	0	2	3	0	0	0	1	1	9
Yukon (Scoffin)	0	0	3	0	0	0	2	2	0	0	7

Sheet C	1	2	3	4	5	6	7	8	9	10	Final
Manitoba (Gunnlaugson) 🔨	2	0	0	2	0	1	0	1	0	3	9
Prince Edward Island (Cochrane)	0	2	1	0	2	0	2	0	1	0	8

Sheet D	1	2	3	4	5	6	7	8	9	10	Final
Newfoundland and Labrador (Gushue) 🔨	2	1	2	1	0	0	1	0	X	X	7
Nunavut (Higgs)	0	0	0	0	1	0	0	2	X	X	3

=== Draw 10 ===
Tuesday, March 3, 2:00 pm

Sheet A	1	2	3	4	5	6	7	8	9	10	Final
Alberta (Bottcher) 🔨	0	2	0	0	2	0	2	0	X	X	6
Nova Scotia (Murphy)	0	0	0	1	0	0	0	1	X	X	2

Sheet B	1	2	3	4	5	6	7	8	9	10	Final
Northern Ontario (Jacobs) 🔨	2	0	0	2	1	1	3	0	X	X	9
Quebec (Bédard)	0	0	1	0	0	0	0	1	X	X	2

Sheet C	1	2	3	4	5	6	7	8	9	10	Final
(Manitoba) Wild Card (McEwen) 🔨	0	0	1	0	0	0	0	0	1	0	2
Canada (K. Koe)	0	0	0	0	0	1	0	0	0	2	3

Sheet D	1	2	3	4	5	6	7	8	9	10	Final
Saskatchewan (Dunstone)	0	0	1	0	0	2	0	0	0	3	6
Ontario (Epping) 🔨	1	0	0	1	0	0	2	0	0	0	4

=== Draw 11 ===
Tuesday, March 3, 7:00 pm

Sheet A	1	2	3	4	5	6	7	8	9	10	Final
Ontario (Epping) 🔨	0	0	2	0	3	0	0	2	X	X	7
(Manitoba) Wild Card (McEwen)	2	1	0	5	0	2	1	0	X	X	11

Sheet B	1	2	3	4	5	6	7	8	9	10	Final
Canada (K. Koe)	0	0	0	1	0	2	0	0	1	0	4
Saskatchewan (Dunstone) 🔨	0	0	1	0	2	0	1	0	0	1	5

Sheet C	1	2	3	4	5	6	7	8	9	10	Final
Quebec (Bédard)	0	0	0	2	0	0	0	1	0	X	3
Alberta (Bottcher) 🔨	1	0	1	0	0	3	1	0	1	X	7

Sheet D	1	2	3	4	5	6	7	8	9	10	Final
Nova Scotia (Murphy)	0	0	0	1	0	0	1	0	0	X	2
Northern Ontario (Jacobs) 🔨	0	2	0	0	2	0	0	0	2	X	6

=== Draw 12 ===
Wednesday, March 4, 9:00 am

Sheet A	1	2	3	4	5	6	7	8	9	10	Final
Nunavut (Higgs)	0	2	0	0	1	0	2	0	X	X	5
Manitoba (Gunnlaugson) 🔨	2	0	2	3	0	2	0	2	X	X	11

Sheet B	1	2	3	4	5	6	7	8	9	10	Final
Prince Edward Island (Cochrane)	0	1	0	2	2	0	2	0	1	X	8
Newfoundland and Labrador (Gushue) 🔨	2	0	3	0	0	1	0	5	0	X	11

Sheet C	1	2	3	4	5	6	7	8	9	10	Final
Yukon (Scoffin)	0	1	0	0	1	0	0	1	0	0	3
British Columbia (Laycock) 🔨	0	0	1	0	0	2	0	0	2	1	6

Sheet D	1	2	3	4	5	6	7	8	9	10	Final
New Brunswick (Grattan) 🔨	1	0	1	1	0	2	0	0	1	0	6
Northwest Territories (J. Koe)	0	3	0	0	1	0	2	1	0	1	8

=== Draw 13 ===
Wednesday, March 4, 2:00 pm

Sheet A	1	2	3	4	5	6	7	8	9	10	Final
Quebec (Bédard)	0	0	1	0	1	0	2	0	X	X	4
Newfoundland and Labrador (Gushue) 🔨	3	0	0	3	0	3	0	1	X	X	10

Sheet B	1	2	3	4	5	6	7	8	9	10	Final
Nova Scotia (Murphy)	0	2	0	1	0	2	0	0	2	0	7
Manitoba (Gunnlaugson) 🔨	1	0	2	0	1	0	2	2	0	1	9

Sheet C	1	2	3	4	5	6	7	8	9	10	Final
Northern Ontario (Jacobs) 🔨	4	1	0	2	3	0	0	0	X	X	10
Nunavut (Higgs)	0	0	1	0	0	0	0	2	X	X	3

Sheet D	1	2	3	4	5	6	7	8	9	10	Final
Alberta (Bottcher) 🔨	2	1	0	0	3	0	2	0	0	1	9
Prince Edward Island (Cochrane)	0	0	0	0	0	3	0	2	1	0	6

=== Draw 14 ===
Wednesday, March 4, 7:00 pm

Sheet A	1	2	3	4	5	6	7	8	9	10	Final
Yukon (Scoffin)	0	0	1	0	1	0	0	1	X	X	3
Saskatchewan (Dunstone) 🔨	3	2	0	3	0	4	0	0	X	X	12

Sheet B	1	2	3	4	5	6	7	8	9	10	Final
New Brunswick (Grattan)	0	1	0	0	0	2	0	1	0	X	4
(Manitoba) Wild Card (McEwen) 🔨	1	0	2	2	0	0	1	0	3	X	9

Sheet C	1	2	3	4	5	6	7	8	9	10	Final
Northwest Territories (J. Koe) 🔨	2	0	3	0	0	0	1	0	2	0	8
Ontario (Epping)	0	1	0	3	0	1	0	2	0	4	11

Sheet D	1	2	3	4	5	6	7	8	9	10	Final
British Columbia (Laycock)	1	0	0	0	1	0	1	0	X	X	3
Canada (K. Koe) 🔨	0	2	0	1	0	4	0	2	X	X	9

== Championship pool standings ==
The top four teams from each pool advance to the Championship pool. All wins and losses earned in the round robin will be carried forward into the Championship Pool. Wins in tiebreaker games are not carried forward.

Final Championship pool standings

Key
Teams to Playoffs
Teams to Tiebreakers

Team	Skip	W	L	PF	PA	EW	EL	BE	SE	S%
Alberta	Brendan Bottcher	10	1	75	40	40	29	19	10	86%
Saskatchewan	Matt Dunstone	8	3	75	61	42	39	16	6	87%
Newfoundland and Labrador	Brad Gushue	8	3	71	51	39	34	12	7	90%
Ontario	John Epping	7	4	82	69	40	43	7	7	85%
Northern Ontario	Brad Jacobs	7	4	70	50	38	30	12	8	90%
Canada	Kevin Koe	7	4	63	45	38	33	12	10	88%
(Manitoba) Wild Card	Mike McEwen	7	4	67	49	43	32	16	10	91%
Manitoba	Jason Gunnlaugson	5	6	75	78	46	43	4	10	83%

== Championship pool results ==
=== Draw 16 ===
Thursday, March 5, 1:00 pm

Sheet A	1	2	3	4	5	6	7	8	9	10	Final
Ontario (Epping) 🔨	0	0	0	4	0	3	2	0	X	X	9
Manitoba (Gunnlaugson)	0	0	1	0	2	0	0	2	X	X	5

Sheet B	1	2	3	4	5	6	7	8	9	10	Final
Alberta (Bottcher) 🔨	2	0	0	0	0	1	2	0	2	2	9
Saskatchewan (Dunstone)	0	2	0	0	1	0	0	2	0	0	5

Sheet C	1	2	3	4	5	6	7	8	9	10	Final
(Manitoba) Wild Card (McEwen)	0	0	1	0	1	0	0	0	2	0	4
Northern Ontario (Jacobs) 🔨	2	0	0	1	0	0	1	1	0	1	6

Sheet D	1	2	3	4	5	6	7	8	9	10	Final
Newfoundland and Labrador (Gushue) 🔨	0	0	2	0	0	2	0	2	1	X	7
Canada (K. Koe)	1	0	0	1	0	0	2	0	0	X	4

=== Draw 17 ===
Thursday, March 5, 7:00 pm

Sheet A	1	2	3	4	5	6	7	8	9	10	11	Final
Canada (K. Koe)	0	0	0	2	0	0	0	0	2	0	1	5
Alberta (Bottcher) 🔨	0	2	0	0	0	1	0	0	0	1	0	4

Sheet B	1	2	3	4	5	6	7	8	9	10	Final
Manitoba (Gunnlaugson)	0	0	0	0	0	1	0	0	2	1	4
(Manitoba) Wild Card (McEwen) 🔨	0	0	0	0	2	0	2	1	0	0	5

Sheet C	1	2	3	4	5	6	7	8	9	10	Final
Newfoundland and Labrador (Gushue) 🔨	1	0	0	1	0	0	0	2	0	X	4
Ontario (Epping)	0	3	1	0	0	0	1	0	3	X	8

Sheet D	1	2	3	4	5	6	7	8	9	10	Final
Saskatchewan (Dunstone) 🔨	1	0	0	2	0	0	1	0	0	X	4
Northern Ontario (Jacobs)	0	2	0	0	0	4	0	1	0	X	7

=== Draw 18 ===
Friday, March 6, 1:00 pm

Sheet A	1	2	3	4	5	6	7	8	9	10	Final
(Manitoba) Wild Card (McEwen) 🔨	0	1	0	0	0	1	0	1	0	X	3
Newfoundland and Labrador (Gushue)	0	0	1	0	0	0	2	0	2	X	5

Sheet B	1	2	3	4	5	6	7	8	9	10	Final
Northern Ontario (Jacobs) 🔨	0	2	1	0	0	4	0	0	X	X	7
Canada (K. Koe)	0	0	0	2	0	0	0	1	X	X	3

Sheet C	1	2	3	4	5	6	7	8	9	10	Final
Manitoba (Gunnlaugson)	1	0	2	0	0	2	0	3	0	0	8
Saskatchewan (Dunstone) 🔨	0	2	0	2	1	0	2	0	0	2	9

Sheet D	1	2	3	4	5	6	7	8	9	10	Final
Ontario (Epping) 🔨	0	1	0	0	2	0	0	0	X	X	3
Alberta (Bottcher)	1	0	2	1	0	0	3	3	X	X	10

=== Draw 19 ===
Friday, March 6, 7:00 pm

Sheet A	1	2	3	4	5	6	7	8	9	10	Final
Northern Ontario (Jacobs) 🔨	0	1	0	2	0	0	2	0	1	0	6
Ontario (Epping)	0	0	2	0	3	0	0	2	0	3	10

Sheet B	1	2	3	4	5	6	7	8	9	10	Final
Saskatchewan (Dunstone) 🔨	1	0	2	0	0	0	0	1	0	2	6
Newfoundland and Labrador (Gushue)	0	2	0	1	0	0	0	0	2	0	5

Sheet C	1	2	3	4	5	6	7	8	9	10	Final
Alberta (Bottcher)	0	0	0	0	0	0	1	0	0	3	4
(Manitoba) Wild Card (McEwen) 🔨	0	0	0	1	0	0	0	1	0	0	2

Sheet D	1	2	3	4	5	6	7	8	9	10	Final
Canada (K. Koe)	0	0	2	0	0	1	2	0	2	X	7
Manitoba (Gunnlaugson) 🔨	1	0	0	1	0	0	0	1	0	X	3

== Tiebreakers ==
To 3 vs. 4 game
Ontario	8
(Manitoba) Wild Card	5
Ontario	4
Northern Ontario	8
Northern Ontario	8
Canada	3

Saturday, March 7, 9:00 am

Sheet B	1	2	3	4	5	6	7	8	9	10	Final
Ontario (Epping) 🔨	1	0	2	0	0	2	0	0	2	1	8
(Manitoba) Wild Card (McEwen)	0	1	0	2	0	0	0	2	0	0	5

Player percentages
Ontario		(Manitoba) Wild Card	
Brent Laing	88%	Colin Hodgson	93%
Mat Camm	84%	Derek Samagalski	75%
Ryan Fry	79%	Reid Carruthers	85%
John Epping	84%	Mike McEwen	84%
Total	83%	Total	84%

Sheet C	1	2	3	4	5	6	7	8	9	10	Final
Northern Ontario (Jacobs) 🔨	0	2	0	1	0	0	2	3	X	X	8
Canada (K. Koe)	0	0	2	0	0	1	0	0	X	X	3

Player percentages
Northern Ontario		Canada	
Ryan Harnden	94%	Ben Hebert	86%
E.J. Harnden	91%	Colton Flasch	86%
Marc Kennedy	89%	B.J. Neufeld	78%
Brad Jacobs	83%	Kevin Koe	77%
Total	89%	Total	82%

Saturday, March 7, 2:00 pm

Sheet C	1	2	3	4	5	6	7	8	9	10	Final
Ontario (Epping) 🔨	0	0	1	0	1	0	1	1	0	X	4
Northern Ontario (Jacobs)	0	1	0	3	0	2	0	0	2	X	8

Player percentages
Ontario		Northern Ontario	
Brent Laing	96%	Ryan Harnden	93%
Mat Camm	90%	E.J. Harnden	94%
Ryan Fry / John Morris	92%	Marc Kennedy	96%
John Epping	90%	Brad Jacobs	92%
Total	92%	Total	94%

== Playoffs ==
Page playoff system
1	Alberta	9
2	Saskatchewan	4
3	Newfoundland and Labrador	7
4	Northern Ontario	4

Semifinal
2	Saskatchewan	6
3	Newfoundland and Labrador	7

Final
1	Alberta	3
3	Newfoundland and Labrador	7

=== 1 vs. 2 ===
Saturday, March 7, 2:00 pm

Sheet B	1	2	3	4	5	6	7	8	9	10	Final
Alberta (Bottcher) 🔨	0	1	1	0	1	1	0	1	0	4	9
Saskatchewan (Dunstone)	0	0	0	1	0	0	1	0	2	0	4

Player percentages
Alberta		Saskatchewan	
Karrick Martin	90%	Dustin Kidby	95%
Brad Thiessen	94%	Catlin Schneider	81%
Darren Moulding	95%	Braeden Moskowy	84%
Brendan Bottcher	89%	Matt Dunstone	84%
Total	92%	Total	86%

=== 3 vs. 4 ===
Saturday, March 7, 7:00 pm

Sheet B	1	2	3	4	5	6	7	8	9	10	Final
Newfoundland and Labrador (Gushue) 🔨	1	0	1	0	2	0	0	1	1	1	7
Northern Ontario (Jacobs)	0	1	0	1	0	2	0	0	0	0	4

Player percentages
Newfoundland and Labrador		Northern Ontario	
Geoff Walker	91%	Ryan Harnden	84%
Brett Gallant	88%	E.J. Harnden	79%
Mark Nichols	85%	Marc Kennedy	91%
Brad Gushue	89%	Brad Jacobs	75%
Total	88%	Total	82%

=== Semifinal ===
Sunday, March 8, 12:00 pm

Sheet B	1	2	3	4	5	6	7	8	9	10	Final
Saskatchewan (Dunstone) 🔨	1	0	2	0	0	1	0	0	2	0	6
Newfoundland and Labrador (Gushue)	0	3	0	2	0	0	0	1	0	1	7

Player percentages
Saskatchewan		Newfoundland and Labrador	
Dustin Kidby	93%	Geoff Walker	89%
Catlin Schneider	88%	Brett Gallant	85%
Braeden Moskowy	75%	Mark Nichols	90%
Matt Dunstone	87%	Brad Gushue	88%
Total	85%	Total	88%

=== Final ===
Sunday, March 8, 7:00 pm

Sheet B	1	2	3	4	5	6	7	8	9	10	Final
Alberta (Bottcher) 🔨	0	1	0	1	0	0	0	0	1	0	3
Newfoundland and Labrador (Gushue)	1	0	3	0	0	1	0	1	0	1	7

Player percentages
Alberta		Newfoundland and Labrador	
Karrick Martin	84%	Geoff Walker	78%
Brad Thiessen	85%	Brett Gallant	80%
Darren Moulding	80%	Mark Nichols	89%
Brendan Bottcher	71%	Brad Gushue	97%
Total	80%	Total	86%

== Statistics ==
=== Top 5 player percentages ===
After Championship Pool; minimum 5 games

Key
First All-Star Team
Second All-Star Team

Leads	%
WC Colin Hodgson	94
(Canada) Ben Hebert	94
(Manitoba) Connor Njegovan	92
(Ontario) Brent Laing	92
(Newfoundland and Labrador) Geoff Walker	92

Seconds	%
(Northern Ontario) E.J. Harnden	91
WC Derek Samagalski	90
(Newfoundland and Labrador) Brett Gallant	88
(Saskatchewan) Catlin Schneider	85
(Alberta) Brad Thiessen	84

Thirds	%
WC Reid Carruthers	91
(Newfoundland and Labrador) Mark Nichols	90
(Northern Ontario) Marc Kennedy	90
(Canada) B.J. Neufeld	87
(Ontario) Ryan Fry	86

Skips	%
(Newfoundland and Labrador) Brad Gushue	91
WC Mike McEwen	90
(Alberta) Brendan Bottcher	88
(Northern Ontario) Brad Jacobs	88
(Canada) Kevin Koe	88

=== Perfect games ===
Round robin and championship pool only

Player	Team	Position	Shots	Opponent
Brett Gallant	Newfoundland and Labrador	Second	16	Manitoba
Kevin Koe	Canada	Skip	16	New Brunswick
Brendan Bottcher	Alberta	Skip	19	Newfoundland and Labrador
Brendan Bottcher	Alberta	Skip	15	Nova Scotia
Matt Dunstone	Saskatchewan	Skip	18	Ontario
Matt Dunstone	Saskatchewan	Skip	20	Canada
Marc Kennedy	Northern Ontario	Third	12	Nunavut
Colin Hodgson	(Manitoba) Wild Card	Lead	20	Northern Ontario
Darren Moulding	Alberta	Third	16	Ontario
Brad Gushue	Newfoundland and Labrador	Skip	20	(Manitoba) Wild Card

== Awards ==
The awards and all-star teams are listed as follows:

All-Star Teams

First Team

- Skip: Brendan Bottcher, Alberta
- Third: (Manitoba) Reid Carruthers, Team Wild Card
- Second: E.J. Harnden, Northern Ontario
- Lead: (Manitoba) Colin Hodgson, Team Wild Card

Second Team

- Skip: (Manitoba) Mike McEwen, Team Wild Card
- Third: Marc Kennedy, Northern Ontario
- Second: (Manitoba) Derek Samagalski, Team Wild Card
- Lead: Ben Hebert, Team Canada

Ross Harstone Sportsmanship Award

- (Manitoba) Colin Hodgson, Team Wild Card Lead

Paul McLean Award

- Geoff Kamada and Shayne Dilling, TSN video editors

Hec Gervais Most Valuable Player Award

- Brad Gushue, Newfoundland and Labrador Skip

== Final standings ==
Team	Rank
Newfoundland and Labrador	1st place, gold medalist(s)
Alberta	2nd place, silver medalist(s)
Saskatchewan	3rd place, bronze medalist(s)
Northern Ontario	4
Ontario	5
Canada	T–6
(Manitoba) Wild Card	T–6
Manitoba	8
New Brunswick	T–9
Nova Scotia	T–9
British Columbia	T–11
Northwest Territories	T–11
Prince Edward Island	T–11
Quebec	14
Nunavut	T–15
Yukon	T–15

== Provincial and territorial playdowns ==
- 2020 Boston Pizza Cup (Alberta)
- (British Columbia) 2020 BC Men's Curling Championship
- 2020 Viterra Championship (Manitoba)
- 2020 New Brunswick Tankard
- 2020 Newfoundland and Labrador Tankard
- 2020 Northern Ontario Men's Provincial Curling Championship
- 2020 Deloitte Tankard (Nova Scotia)
- 2020 Ontario Tankard
- (Prince Edward Island) 2020 PEI Tankard
- 2020 Quebec Tankard
- 2020 SaskTel Tankard (Saskatchewan)
- 2020 Northwest Territories Men's Curling Championship
- 2020 Yukon Men's Curling Championship
- 2020 Nunavut Brier Playdowns
