= Alek Bédard =

Canadian curler

- Curler
- Born: December 12, 1996 (age 29); Lacolle, Quebec

Team
- Curling club: Lacolle CC, Lacolle, QC

Curling career
- Member Association: Quebec
- Brier: 1 (2020)
- Top CTRS ranking: 60th (2019–20)

Alek Bédard (born December 12, 1996) is a Canadian curler from Lacolle, Quebec.

== Career ==
Bédard won his first Quebec Junior Curling Championship in 2018, skipping his team of Louis Quevillon, Émile Asselin and Bradley Lequin. This qualified them for the 2018 Canadian Junior Curling Championships, held January 13–21 in Shawinigan, Quebec. At the championship, Bédard led his team to a 4–2 round robin record, which was enough to qualify them for the championship pool. They then lost three of their four games, finishing the tournament in seventh place with a 5–5 record. Team Bédard aged out of juniors the following season and began competing on the World Curling Tour. In their three events, they finished runner-up at the Finale du Circuit and reached the semifinals at both the Experience Curling Classic and the Vic Open Assurances Jean Gamache. At the 2019 WFG Tankard, they missed the championship round with a 3–3 record.

During the 2019–20 season, Team Bédard competed in four tour events but only found success in one, the Challenge Casino de Charlevoix, where they reached the semifinals. At the 2020 Quebec Tankard, the team qualified for the championship round with a 5–1 record. They then went 2–1 in their next three games, good enough to earn them a spot in the 3 vs. 4 page playoff game. They then defeated Martin Ferland 9–8 in the 3 vs. 4 game, upset Mike Fournier 9–8 in the semifinal and beat Vincent Roberge 7–2 to claim the championship title. Their win earned them a berth to the 2020 Tim Hortons Brier in Kingston, Ontario. There, they finished with a 1–6 record, only managing to beat Team Nunavut.

Due to the COVID-19 pandemic in Quebec, the 2021 provincial championship was cancelled. Curling Québec then decided to select Team Fournier to represent Quebec at the 2021 Tim Hortons Brier, meaning Team Bédard would not have the opportunity to repeat as back-to-back provincials champions.

Team Bédard had a strong start to the 2021–22 season, reaching the final of the Moosehead Classic. They then won the Challenge Nord-Ouest Air Creebec, beating the Jean-Sébastien Roy rink in the final game. They had two more playoff appearances during the season at the Challenge Casino de Charlevoix and the Finale du Circuit where they reached the quarterfinals and semifinals respectively. The Quebec Tankard was once again cancelled due to the pandemic and the Fournier rink was appointed as the provinces representatives, ending Team Bédard's season.

== Personal life ==
Bédard is currently a computer science student at the McGill University. He also works as a programmer-analyst for GIRO Inc.

== Teams ==
Season	Skip	Third	Second	Lead
2013–14	Louis Quevillon	Alek Bédard	Julien Ethier	Bradley Lequin
2014–15	Louis Quevillon	Alek Bédard	Julien Ethier	Bradley Lequin
2015–16	Louis Quevillon	Alek Bédard	Julien Ethier	Bradley Lequin
2016–17	Alek Bédard	Louis Quevillon	Émile Asselin	Bradley Lequin
2017–18	Alek Bédard	Louis Quevillon	Émile Asselin	Bradley Lequin
2018–19	Alek Bédard	Louis Quevillon	Julien Tremblay	Charles Auclair
2019–20	Alek Bédard	Louis Quevillon	Émile Asselin	Bradley Lequin
2020–21	Alek Bédard	Louis Quevillon	Émile Asselin	Bradley Lequin
2021–22	Alek Bédard	Louis Quevillon	Émile Asselin	Bradley Lequin
