= Capital Curling Classic =

The Capital Curling Classic is an annual bonspiel on the men's and women's Ontario Curling Tour. It is held annually in at the beginning of October at the RCMP Curling Club in Ottawa, Ontario.

Past event names include the OVCT Parliament Cup, Parliament Cup, Mac Ice Classic, and the Moosehead Classic.

It became an exclusively open event in 2018 (open to both genders).

== Past Champions ==
Year	Winning skip	Runner up skip	Purse (CAD)
2004	(Quebec) Don Westphal	(Quebec) Jean-Michel Ménard	$32,000
2005	(Ontario) Bryan Cochrane	(Ontario) Heath McCormick	$31,000
2006	(Quebec) Pierre Charette	(Ontario) John Epping	$43,300
2007	(Quebec) Jean-Michel Ménard	(Ontario) Greg Richardson	
2008	(Quebec) Jean-Michel Ménard		
2009	(Quebec) Simon Dupuis	(Quebec) Martin Ferland	
2010	(Ontario) Bryan Cochrane	(Ontario) Howard Rajala	$24,000
2011	(Quebec) Jean-Michel Ménard	(Ontario) Howard Rajala	$23,000
2012	(Ontario) Ian MacAulay	(Ontario) Trevor Bonot	$20,000
2013	(Ontario) Ian MacAulay	(Ontario) Don Bowser	$20,000
2014	(Quebec) Jean-Michel Ménard	(Ontario) Ian MacAulay	$17,000
2015	(Quebec) Jean-Michel Ménard	(Ontario) Mike McLean	$18,000
2016	(Quebec) Jean-Michel Ménard	(Quebec) Mike Fournier	$15,000
2017	(Quebec) François Gagné	(Quebec) Jean-Michel Ménard	$10,000
2018	(Ontario) Colin Dow	(Ontario) Mark Homan	$6,200
2019	(Ontario) Jason Camm	(Quebec) Greg Balsdon	$5,500
2021	(Quebec) Alek Bédard	(Ontario) Howard Rajala	$12,200
2022	(Ontario) Jason Camm	(Quebec) Vincent Roberge	$15,000
2023	(Quebec) François Roberge	(Quebec) Yannick Martel	$6,000
2024	(Quebec) François Roberge	(Ontario) Jacob Lamb	$15,000
2025	(Quebec) François Roberge	(Quebec) Leandre Girard	$15,000

== Past Women's Champions ==
Year	Winning skip	Runner up skip	Purse (CAD)
2005	(Ontario) Laura Payne		
2008	(Ontario) Jenn Hanna		
2009	(Ontario) Jenn Hanna	(Ontario) Rachel Homan	
2010	(Ontario) Rachel Homan	(Quebec) Marie-France Larouche	$14,400
2011	(Ontario) Jenn Hanna	(Ontario) Laura Payne	$12,600
2012	(Quebec) Marie-France Larouche	(Ontario) Lauren Horton	$9,000
2013	(Quebec) Allison Ross	(Ontario) Jenn Hanna	$9,000

== Past Open Champions ==
Year	Winning skip	Runner up skip	Purse (CAD)
2016	(Ontario) John Steski	(Ontario) Sierra Sutherland	$3,600
2017	(Ontario) Nathan Martin	(Ontario) Cassandra Lewin	$3,600
