= 2018 Canadian Junior Curling Championships =

- Host city: Shawinigan, Québec
- Arena: Aréna Grand-Mère; Centre municipal de curling de Shawinigan
- Dates: January 13–21
- Men's winner: British Columbia
- Skip: Tyler Tardi
- Third: Sterling Middleton
- Second: Jordan Tardi
- Lead: Zac Curtis
- Coach: Paul Tardi
- Finalist: Northern Ontario (Tanner Horgan)
- Women's winner: Nova Scotia
- Skip: Kaitlyn Jones
- Third: Kristin Clarke
- Second: Karlee Burgess
- Lead: Lindsey Burgess
- Coach: Andrew Atherton
- Finalist: Quebec (Laurie St-Georges)

The 2018 New Holland Canadian Junior Curling Championships was held from January 13 to 21 at the Aréna Grand-Mère and the Centre municipal de curling de Shawinigan in Shawinigan, Québec. The winners represented Canada at the 2018 World Junior Curling Championships in Aberdeen, Scotland.

== Men ==
=== Round-robin standings ===
Final round-robin standings

Key
| Teams to Championship Pool |
| Teams to Tiebreakers |

| Pool A | Skip | W | L |
|---|---|---|---|
| British Columbia | Tyler Tardi | 5 | 1 |
| Manitoba | J.T. Ryan | 5 | 1 |
| Quebec | Alek Bédard | 4 | 2 |
| Nova Scotia | Matthew Manuel | 3 | 3 |
| New Brunswick | Liam Marin | 2 | 4 |
| Yukon | Joe Wallingham | 1 | 5 |
| Saskatchewan | Rylan Kleiter | 1 | 5 |

| Pool B | Skip | W | L |
|---|---|---|---|
| Northern Ontario | Tanner Horgan | 6 | 0 |
| Ontario | Matthew Hall | 5 | 1 |
| Alberta | Karsten Sturmay | 4 | 2 |
| Newfoundland and Labrador | Daniel Bruce | 3 | 3 |
| Prince Edward Island | Alex MacFayden | 2 | 4 |
| Northwest Territories | Sawer Kaeser | 1 | 5 |
| Nunavut | David Aglukark | 0 | 6 |

=== Championship Pool Standings ===
Final round-robin standings

Key
| Teams to Playoffs |
| Teams to Tiebreakers |

| Province | Skip | W | L |
|---|---|---|---|
| Northern Ontario | Tanner Horgan | 8 | 2 |
| British Columbia | Tyler Tardi | 7 | 3 |
| Manitoba | J.T. Ryan | 7 | 3 |
| Ontario | Matthew Hall | 7 | 3 |
| Alberta | Karsten Sturmay | 7 | 3 |
| Nova Scotia | Matthew Manuel | 6 | 4 |
| Quebec | Alek Bédard | 5 | 5 |
| Newfoundland and Labrador | Daniel Bruce | 4 | 6 |

=== Playoffs ===
| Semifinal | | | Final |
| | | | 1 | Northern Ontario | 4 |
| 2 | British Columbia | 9 | 2 | British Columbia | 8 |
| 3 | Manitoba | 8 |

=== Semifinal ===
Saturday, January 20, 18:00

| Team | 1 | 2 | 3 | 4 | 5 | 6 | 7 | 8 | 9 | 10 | Final |
|---|---|---|---|---|---|---|---|---|---|---|---|
| British Columbia (Tardi) | 0 | 0 | 3 | 0 | 2 | 0 | 0 | 2 | 0 | 2 | 9 |
| Manitoba (Ryan) | 0 | 0 | 0 | 2 | 0 | 3 | 1 | 0 | 2 | 0 | 8 |

Player percentages
| British Columbia | | Manitoba | |
|---|---|---|---|
| Zac Curtis | 84% | Brendan Bilawka | 84% |
| Jordan Tardi | 89% | Colin Kurz | 88% |
| Sterling Middleton | 95% | Jacques Gauthier | 80% |
| Tyler Tardi | 92% | J.T. Ryan | 84% |
| Total | 90% | Total | 84% |

=== Final ===
Sunday, January 21, 18:00

| Team | 1 | 2 | 3 | 4 | 5 | 6 | 7 | 8 | 9 | 10 | Final |
|---|---|---|---|---|---|---|---|---|---|---|---|
| Northern Ontario (Horgan) | 0 | 0 | 1 | 0 | 0 | 1 | 0 | 0 | 2 | 0 | 4 |
| British Columbia (Tardi) | 1 | 1 | 0 | 2 | 0 | 0 | 0 | 3 | 0 | 1 | 8 |

Player percentages
| Northern Ontario | | British Columbia | |
|---|---|---|---|
| Maxime Blais | 86% | Zac Curtis | 72% |
| Nicholas Bissonnette | 79% | Jordan Tardi | 90% |
| Jacob Horgan | 88% | Sterling Middleton | 94% |
| Tanner Horgan | 75% | Tyler Tardi | 99% |
| Total | 82% | Total | 89% |

== Women ==
=== Round-robin standings ===
Final round-robin standings

Key
| Teams to Championship Pool |
| Teams to Tiebreakers |

| Pool A | Skip | W | L |
|---|---|---|---|
| Nova Scotia | Kaitlyn Jones | 5 | 1 |
| New Brunswick | Justine Comeau | 4 | 2 |
| Alberta | Kayla Skrlik | 4 | 2 |
| Quebec | Laurie St-Georges | 4 | 2 |
| Manitoba | Shae Bevan | 3 | 3 |
| Saskatchewan | Sara England | 1 | 5 |
| Yukon | Kelsey Meger | 0 | 6 |

| Pool B | Skip | W | L |
|---|---|---|---|
| Newfoundland and Labrador | Mackenzie Glynn | 5 | 1 |
| Prince Edward Island | Lauren Lenentine | 5 | 1 |
| Ontario | Emma Wallingford | 5 | 1 |
| Northern Ontario | Hailey Beaudry | 3 | 3 |
| British Columbia | Taylor Reese-Hansen | 2 | 4 |
| Nunavut | Sadie Pinksen | 1 | 5 |
| Northwest Territories | Tyanna Bain | 0 | 6 |

=== Championship Pool Standings ===
Final round-robin standings

Key
| Teams to Playoffs |
| Teams to Tiebreakers |

| Province | Skip | W | L |
|---|---|---|---|
| Nova Scotia | Kaitlyn Jones | 9 | 1 |
| New Brunswick | Justine Comeau | 8 | 2 |
| Quebec | Laurie St-Georges | 8 | 2 |
| Alberta | Kayla Skrlik | 7 | 3 |
| Ontario | Emma Wallingford | 6 | 4 |
| Newfoundland and Labrador | Mackenzie Glynn | 5 | 5 |
| Prince Edward Island | Lauren Lenentine | 5 | 5 |
| Northern Ontario | Hailey Beaudry | 3 | 7 |

=== Playoffs ===
| Semifinal | | | Final |
| | | | 1 | Nova Scotia | 5 |
| 2 | New Brunswick | 3 | 3 | Quebec | 3 |
| 3 | Quebec | 9 |

=== Semifinal ===
Saturday, January 20, 13:00

| Team | 1 | 2 | 3 | 4 | 5 | 6 | 7 | 8 | 9 | 10 | Final |
|---|---|---|---|---|---|---|---|---|---|---|---|
| New Brunswick (Comeau) | 1 | 0 | 0 | 1 | 0 | 0 | 0 | 1 | X | X | 3 |
| Quebec (St-Georges) | 0 | 2 | 3 | 0 | 1 | 2 | 1 | 0 | X | X | 9 |

Player percentages
| New Brunswick | | Quebec | |
|---|---|---|---|
| Keira McLaughlin | 78% | Isabelle Thiboutot | 79% |
| Brigitte Comeau | 73% | Emily Riley | 80% |
| Emma Le Blanc | 80% | Cynthia St-Georges | 92% |
| Justine Comeau | 61% | Laurie St-Georges | 92% |
| Total | 73% | Total | 86% |

=== Final ===
Sunday, January 21, 13:00

| Team | 1 | 2 | 3 | 4 | 5 | 6 | 7 | 8 | 9 | 10 | Final |
|---|---|---|---|---|---|---|---|---|---|---|---|
| Nova Scotia (Jones) | 0 | 0 | 2 | 0 | 0 | 2 | 0 | 1 | 0 | X | 5 |
| Quebec (St-Georges) | 0 | 0 | 0 | 2 | 0 | 0 | 0 | 0 | 1 | X | 3 |

Player percentages
| Nova Scotia | | Quebec | |
|---|---|---|---|
| Lindsey Burgess | 59% | Isabelle Thiboutot | 81% |
| Karlee Burgess | 88% | Emily Riley | 73% |
| Kristin Clarke | 85% | Cynthia St-Georges | 80% |
| Kaitlyn Jones | 89% | Laurie St-Georges | 69% |
| Total | 80% | Total | 76% |

== Qualification ==
=== Ontario ===
The Ontario U21 Provincial Championships were held December 27–30, 2017 at the Annandale Golf & Curling Club in Ajax.

Results:

| Men's | W | L |
|---|---|---|
| John Willsey (KW Granite) | 7 | 0 |
| Josh Leung (Whitby) | 5 | 2 |
| Matthew Hall (Westmount) | 5 | 2 |
| Charlie Richard (Highland) | 4 | 3 |
| Ryan Hahn (Ottawa Hunt) | 2 | 5 |
| Ryan Fayaz (Listowel) | 2 | 5 |
| Nathan Marshall (Ayr) | 2 | 5 |
| Sam Steep (Seaforth) | 1 | 6 |

| Women's | W | L |
|---|---|---|
| Jestyn Murphy (Mississaugua) | 6 | 1 |
| Emma Wallingford (Ottawa) | 5 | 2 |
| Marie-Elaine Little (Granite) | 4 | 3 |
| Rachel Steele (Port Perry) | 4 | 3 |
| Courtney Auld (Weston) | 3 | 4 |
| Madelyn Warriner (Listowel) | 3 | 4 |
| Mackenzie Kiemele (Toronto Cricket) | 2 | 5 |
| Breanna Rozon (Dundas Valley) | 1 | 6 |

Playoffs

- Men's semifinal: Hall 8-4 Leung
- Men's final: Hall 7-2 Willsey
- Women's tiebreaker: Little 6-4 Steele
- Women's semifinal: Wallingford 8-4 Little
- Women's final: Wallingford 8-6 Murphy
