= Challenge de Curling Desjardins =

Curling tournament in Clemont, Québec

- Established: c. 2000
- Host city: Clermont, Quebec
- Arena: Aréna de Clermont & Club de Curling Nairn
- Men's purse: $28,000
- Women's purse: $9,000

Current champions (2025)
- Men: (Quebec) Jean-Michel Ménard
- Women: (Quebec) Gabrielle Lavoie

Location in Canada

The Challenge de Curling Desjardins, formerly the Challenge Casino de Charlevoix is an annual bonspiel, or curling tournament, that takes place at the Aréna de Clermont and the Club de Curling Nairn in Clermont, Québec. The tournament is held in a triple-knockout format. The tournament, which was sponsored by Casino de Charlevoix until 2021, has been held every year (except 2020) since at least 2003 and was part of the World Curling Tour from 2003 to 2019. This tournament, along with the Challenge Casino Lac Leamy, was one of the few major curling events in Québec. Desjardins Insurance became the title sponsor in 2022.

== Past champions ==
=== Men ===
Only skip's name is displayed.

Year	Winning team	Runner up team	Purse (CAD)
2003	(Quebec) François Gagné	(Quebec) Daniel Lafleur	$18,100
2004	(Quebec) Serge Reid	(Quebec) Jean-Pierre Venne	$21,000
2005	(New Brunswick) Russ Howard	(Quebec) François Gagné	$21,000
2006	(Ontario) Bryan Cochrane	(New Brunswick) Mike Kennedy	$30,000
2007	(Ontario) Peter Steski	(Quebec) Robert Desjardins	$34,000
2008	(China) Wang Fengchun	(Ontario) Peter Steski	$36,000
2009	(Alberta) Randy Ferbey	(Quebec) Jean-Michel Ménard	$38,000
2010	(Manitoba) Mike McEwen	(Quebec) Serge Reid	$37,000
2011	(Prince Edward Island) Brett Gallant	(Newfoundland and Labrador) Brad Gushue	$37,000
2012	(Switzerland) Peter de Cruz	(Ontario) Brad Jacobs	$37,000
2013	(Ontario) Brad Jacobs	(Quebec) Martin Ferland	$37,000
2014	(Quebec) Jean-Michel Ménard	(Ontario) Don Bowser	$37,000
2015	(Ontario) Greg Balsdon	(Quebec) Jean-Michel Ménard	$27,000
2016	(Nova Scotia) Stuart Thompson	(Nova Scotia) Chad Stevens	$27,000
2017	(Quebec) Martin Ferland	(Nova Scotia) Stuart Thompson	$27,000
2018	(Quebec) Jean-Sébastien Roy	(Quebec) Mike Fournier	$27,000
2019	(Ontario) Scott McDonald	(Quebec) Vincent Roberge	$27,000
2020	Cancelled		
2021	(Quebec) Mike Fournier	(Nova Scotia) Paul Flemming	$27,000
2022	(Ontario) John Epping	(Quebec) Félix Asselin	$27,000
2023	(Quebec) Jean-Michel Arsenault	(Nova Scotia) Paul Flemming	$25,000
2024	(Nova Scotia) Matthew Manuel	(Prince Edward Island) Tyler Smith	$28,000
2025	(Quebec) Jean-Michel Ménard	(Newfoundland and Labrador) Ty Dilello	$28,000

=== Women ===
Only skip's name is displayed.

Year	Winning team	Runner up team	Purse (CAD)
2025	(Quebec) Gabrielle Lavoie	(Quebec) Valerie Tanguay	$5,500

=== Open ===
Only skip's name is displayed.

Year	Winning team	Runner up team	Purse (CAD)
2022	(Quebec) Sylvain Bellavance	(Quebec) Leandre Girard	
2023	(Quebec) Pierre Lajoie	(Quebec) Normand Bornais	
