= Vincent Roberge =

Canadian curler

- Curler
- Born: December 16, 1997 (age 28); Lévis, Quebec

Team
- Curling club: CC Etchemin, Saint-Romuald, QC

Curling career
- Member Association: Quebec
- Brier: 1 (2024)
- Top CTRS ranking: 22nd (2019–20)

Vincent Roberge (born December 16, 1997) is a Canadian curler from Lévis, Quebec.

== Career ==
Roberge won his first Quebec Junior Curling Championship in 2017, skipping his team of Julien Tremblay, Étienne Elmaleh and Fabien Roberge. This qualified them for the 2017 Canadian Junior Curling Championships, held January 21–29 in Esquimalt, British Columbia. At the championship, Roberge's team just missed qualifying for the championship pool, finishing the round robin with a 2–4 record. They then went 3–1 in the seeding pool to finish the tournament with an overall 5–5 record. Two seasons later, Roberge won his second provincial junior title, qualifying his team of Jesse Mullen, Simon-Olivier Hebert and Bradley Lequin for the 2019 Canadian Junior Curling Championships in Prince Albert, Saskatchewan. Roberge and his team fared much better this time around, qualifying for the championship pool with a 4–2 round robin record. They then went 1–3 in the championship pool, ultimately finishing the tournament in sixth place.

Out of juniors, Team Roberge began competing on the World Curling Tour for the 2019–20 season. The team immediately found success on tour, winning the La Classique Ville de Lévis and the Dave Jones Stanhope Simpson Insurance Mayflower Cashspiel. They then finished runner-up at both the Challenge Casino de Charlevoix and the Finale de Circuit before winning the Vic Open Assurances Jean Gamache spiel in the new year. At the 2020 Quebec Tankard, the team qualified for the championship round with a perfect 6–0 record. They then went 2–1 in their next three games, good enough to earn them a spot in the 1 vs. 2 page playoff game as the number one seed. They then defeated Mike Fournier 7–2 in the 1 vs. 2 game before losing to the Alek Bédard rink 7–2 in the championship final.

Due to the COVID-19 pandemic in Canada, the qualification process for the 2021 Canadian Olympic Curling Trials had to be modified to qualify enough teams for the championship. In these modifications, Curling Canada created the 2021 Canadian Curling Pre-Trials Direct-Entry Event, an event where eight teams would compete to try to earn one of two spots into the 2021 Canadian Olympic Curling Pre-Trials. Team Roberge qualified for the Pre-Trials Direct-Entry Event as the third seed. The team qualified for the playoffs by going 3–0 in the A Event and then defeated Team JT Ryan 5–4 to earn the first spot in the Pre-Trials. The next month, the team competed in the Pre-Trials where they finished with a 2–4 record, not enough to reach the playoffs.

== Personal life ==
Roberge is currently employed as an advisor at Primeau Vélo.

== Teams ==
Season	Skip	Third	Second	Lead
2015–16	Vincent Roberge	Julien Tremblay	Étienne Elmaleh	Fabien Roberge
2016–17	Vincent Roberge	Julien Tremblay	Étienne Elmaleh	Fabien Roberge
2017–18	Vincent Roberge	Jesse Mullen	Julien Tremblay	Fabien Roberge
2018–19	Vincent Roberge	Jesse Mullen	Simon-Olivier Hebert	Bradley Lequin
2019–20	Vincent Roberge	Jesse Mullen	Jean-Michel Arsenault	Julien Tremblay
2020–21	Vincent Roberge	Jean-Michel Arsenault	Jesse Mullen	Julien Tremblay
2021–22	Vincent Roberge	Jean-Michel Arsenault	Jesse Mullen	Julien Tremblay
2022–23	Vincent Roberge	Jean-Michel Arsenault	Jesse Mullen	Julien Tremblay
