= 2008 Canadian Junior Curling Championships =

The 2008 M&M Meat Shops Canadian Junior Curling Championships was held February 2–10 at the Soo Curlers Association and Tarentorous Curling Club in Sault Ste. Marie, Ontario. The winning teams represented Canada at the 2008 World Junior Curling Championships.

== Men's ==
=== Teams ===
Province / Territory	Skip	Third	Second	Lead
Alberta	Aaron Sluchinski	Justin Sluchinski	Colin Hodgson	Tylor Bennet
British Columbia	Chase Martyn	Jay Wakefield (Skip)	Paul Cseke	Jamie Danbrook
Manitoba	Kyle Peters	Ian Fordyce	Nigel Milnes	Stuart Shiells
New Brunswick	Jon Rennie	Chris Sleep	Jason Pye	Alex Kyle
Newfoundland and Labrador	Colin Thomas	Stephen Ryan	Spencer Wicks	Andrew Lehr
Northern Ontario	Kory Carr	Justin Whitehurst	Adam Lamers	Mark Adams
Northwest Territories	Colin Miller	Rob Heimbach	John Murray	David Aho
Nova Scotia	Kelsey Amero	Adrian Anctil	Cameron MacKenzie	Justin Burns
Ontario	Travis Fanset	Craig Van Ymeren	Geoff Chambers	Christopher Jay
Prince Edward Island	Brett Gallant	Adam Casey	Anson Carmody	Alex MacFadyen
Quebec	William Dion	Jean-Michel Arsenault	Erik Lachance	Miquel Bernard
Saskatchewan	Brennen Jones	Mitch Criton	DJ Kidby	Dallan Muyres
Yukon	Thomas Scoffin	Will Mahoney	Nicholas Koltun	Mitchell Young

=== Standings ===
Locale	Skip	W	L
Quebec	William Dion	10	2
Prince Edward Island	Brett Gallant	9	3
Saskatchewan	Brennen Jones	9	3
Ontario	Travis Fanset	9	3
Alberta	Aaron Sluchinski	7	5
Northern Ontario	Kory Carr	7	5
Newfoundland and Labrador	Colin Thomas	6	6
Manitoba	Kyle Peters	5	7
British Columbia	Jay Wakefield	5	7
New Brunswick	Jon Rennie	4	8
Nova Scotia	Kelsey Amero	3	9
Yukon	Thomas Scoffin	3	9
Northwest Territories	Colin Miller	1	11

=== Results ===
==== Draw 1 ====
Sheet A	1	2	3	4	5	6	7	8	9	10	Final
Northwest Territories (Miller) 🔨	1	3	0	1	0	0	1	0	1	0	7
Northern Ontario (Carr)	0	0	3	0	3	1	0	1	0	2	10

Sheet E	1	2	3	4	5	6	7	8	9	10	Final
Manitoba (Peters) 🔨	2	0	0	1	0	1	0	0	1	0	5
Quebec (Dion)	0	2	1	0	0	0	2	0	0	1	6

Sheet G	1	2	3	4	5	6	7	8	9	10	Final
Yukon (Scoffin) 🔨	2	0	0	0	2	1	0	0	2	X	7
British Columbia (Wakefield)	0	2	1	1	0	0	4	0	0	X	8

Sheet I	1	2	3	4	5	6	7	8	9	10	Final
Saskatchewan (Jones) 🔨	2	0	2	0	2	0	1	1	1	X	9
Nova Scotia (Amero)	0	1	0	1	0	1	0	0	0	X	3

==== Draw 2 ====
Sheet A	1	2	3	4	5	6	7	8	9	10	Final
Ontario (Fanset) 🔨	0	1	0	1	1	2	0	2	0	1	8
Prince Edward Island (Gallant)	1	0	3	0	0	0	1	0	1	0	6

Sheet C	1	2	3	4	5	6	7	8	9	10	Final
Newfoundland and Labrador (Thomas) 🔨	2	0	1	0	3	1	0	2	0	X	9
Northwest Territories (Miller)	0	1	0	3	0	0	1	0	1	X	6

Sheet E	1	2	3	4	5	6	7	8	9	10	Final
New Brunswick (Rennie) 🔨	1	0	2	0	0	0	0	X	X	X	3
Saskatchewan (Jones)	0	1	0	3	2	2	2	X	X	X	10

Sheet I	1	2	3	4	5	6	7	8	9	10	Final
Alberta (Sluchinski) 🔨	4	0	0	0	3	0	0	1	0	0	8
Yukon (Scoffin)	0	2	1	1	0	1	1	0	1	0	7

==== Draw 3 ====
Sheet B	1	2	3	4	5	6	7	8	9	10	Final
Nova Scotia (Amero) 🔨	3	0	1	0	1	0	0	0	1	X	6
Manitoba (Peters)	0	3	0	2	0	2	2	1	0	X	10

Sheet D	1	2	3	4	5	6	7	8	9	10	Final
Northern Ontario (Carr) 🔨	4	2	0	1	0	0	0	0	1	0	8
Alberta (Sluchinski)	0	0	1	0	2	1	3	1	0	1	9

Sheet F	1	2	3	4	5	6	7	8	9	10	Final
Prince Edward Island (Gallant) 🔨	2	0	0	2	1	0	1	0	1	X	7
Newfoundland and Labrador (Thomas)	0	1	0	0	0	1	0	1	0	X	3

Sheet H	1	2	3	4	5	6	7	8	9	10	Final
Quebec (Dion) 🔨	0	0	0	0	1	0	2	1	X	X	4
Ontario (Fanset)	1	1	1	2	0	2	0	0	X	X	7

Sheet J	1	2	3	4	5	6	7	8	9	10	Final
British Columbia (Wakefield) 🔨	1	0	3	1	2	1	X	X	X	X	8
New Brunswick (Rennie)	0	1	0	0	0	0	X	X	X	X	1

==== Draw 4 ====
Sheet A	1	2	3	4	5	6	7	8	9	10	Final
Saskatchewan (Jones) 🔨	2	0	0	1	0	1	0	1	0	X	5
Manitoba (Peters)	0	0	2	0	3	0	2	0	1	X	8

Sheet C	1	2	3	4	5	6	7	8	9	10	Final
Quebec (Dion) 🔨	0	2	1	1	0	1	0	0	4	X	9
Prince Edward Island (Gallant)	0	0	0	0	2	0	2	1	0	X	5

Sheet E	1	2	3	4	5	6	7	8	9	10	Final
Northern Ontario (Carr) 🔨	1	0	1	1	1	1	0	1	1	X	7
Yukon (Scoffin)	0	1	0	0	0	0	1	0	0	X	2

Sheet H	1	2	3	4	5	6	7	8	9	10	Final
Alberta (Sluchinski) 🔨	2	0	0	0	0	0	2	0	1	0	5
British Columbia (Wakefield)	0	2	1	0	0	1	0	1	0	1	6

Sheet J	1	2	3	4	5	6	7	8	9	10	Final
Ontario (Fanset) 🔨	0	1	3	0	1	1	2	0	2	X	10
Newfoundland and Labrador (Thomas)	1	0	0	1	0	0	0	0	0	X	2

==== Draw 5 ====
Sheet D	1	2	3	4	5	6	7	8	9	10	Final
New Brunswick (Rennie) 🔨	2	0	1	2	4	0	X	X	X	X	9
Nova Scotia (Amero)	0	1	0	0	0	1	X	X	X	X	2

Sheet E	1	2	3	4	5	6	7	8	9	10	Final
British Columbia (Wakefield) 🔨	0	1	0	2	1	0	3	0	0	0	7
Saskatchewan (Jones)	1	0	3	0	0	2	0	1	1	1	9

Sheet I	1	2	3	4	5	6	7	8	9	10	Final
Prince Edward Island (Gallant) 🔨	2	1	0	1	0	0	1	0	3	X	8
Northwest Territories (Miller)	0	0	1	0	2	0	0	1	0	X	4

==== Draw 6 ====
Sheet B	1	2	3	4	5	6	7	8	9	10	Final
Northwest Territories (Miller) 🔨	0	1	0	0	0	0	X	X	X	X	1
Alberta (Sluchinski)	1	0	3	2	1	4	X	X	X	X	11

Sheet C	1	2	3	4	5	6	7	8	9	10	Final
Manitoba (Peters) 🔨	4	0	2	0	3	0	X	X	X	X	9
Ontario (Fanset)	0	1	0	1	0	0	X	X	X	X	2

Sheet F	1	2	3	4	5	6	7	8	9	10	Final
Nova Scotia (Amero) 🔨	0	0	0	1	0	0	0	X	X	X	1
Quebec (Dion)	1	0	2	0	2	1	2	X	X	X	8

Sheet H	1	2	3	4	5	6	7	8	9	10	Final
Newfoundland and Labrador (Thomas) 🔨	1	0	0	0	1	0	2	0	3	0	7
Northern Ontario (Carr)	0	1	0	3	0	2	0	2	0	2	10

Sheet I	1	2	3	4	5	6	7	8	9	10	Final
Yukon (Scoffin) 🔨	0	0	1	0	4	0	1	0	0	2	8
New Brunswick (Rennie)	1	3	0	1	0	1	0	0	1	0	7

==== Draw 7 ====
Sheet B	1	2	3	4	5	6	7	8	9	10	Final
Yukon (Scoffin) 🔨	0	0	1	0	1	0	0	X	X	X	2
Saskatchewan (Jones)	3	0	0	3	0	1	2	X	X	X	9

Sheet D	1	2	3	4	5	6	7	8	9	10	Final
Ontario (Fanset) 🔨	3	0	0	1	1	0	0	1	2	0	8
Northwest Territories (Miller)	0	1	1	0	0	1	3	0	0	1	7

Sheet E	1	2	3	4	5	6	7	8	9	10	Final
Newfoundland and Labrador (Thomas) 🔨	0	0	2	0	0	1	1	0	1	X	5
Alberta (Sluchinski)	2	2	0	1	1	0	0	1	0	X	7

Sheet G	1	2	3	4	5	6	7	8	9	10	Final
New Brunswick (Rennie) 🔨	0	2	1	1	1	0	4	X	X	X	9
Manitoba (Peters)	1	0	0	0	0	1	0	X	X	X	2

==== Draw 8 ====
Sheet C	1	2	3	4	5	6	7	8	9	10	Final
Northern Ontario (Carr) 🔨	1	0	2	0	1	0	1	0	2	0	7
British Columbia (Wakefield)	0	3	0	2	0	1	0	1	0	1	8

Sheet E	1	2	3	4	5	6	7	8	9	10	Final
Nova Scotia (Amero) 🔨	2	0	0	1	0	2	0	0	1	0	6
Ontario (Fanset)	0	2	1	0	1	0	0	1	0	2	7

Sheet H	1	2	3	4	5	6	7	8	9	10	11	Final
Saskatchewan (Jones) 🔨	0	0	0	3	0	0	2	0	0	0	1	6
Quebec (Dion)	1	1	0	0	2	0	0	0	0	1	0	5

Sheet J	1	2	3	4	5	6	7	8	9	10	Final
Manitoba (Peters) 🔨	0	0	0	0	0	1	0	X	X	X	1
Prince Edward Island (Gallant)	1	0	2	2	1	0	2	X	X	X	8

==== Draw 9 ====
Sheet A	1	2	3	4	5	6	7	8	9	10	Final
Quebec (Dion) 🔨	1	0	1	0	1	0	1	0	3	X	7
Newfoundland and Labrador (Thomas)	0	1	0	0	0	1	0	1	0	X	3

Sheet C	1	2	3	4	5	6	7	8	9	10	Final
Alberta (Sluchinski) 🔨	3	0	2	1	0	3	X	X	X	X	9
New Brunswick (Rennie)	0	1	0	0	1	0	X	X	X	X	2

Sheet F	1	2	3	4	5	6	7	8	9	10	Final
Northwest Territories (Miller) 🔨	0	1	1	0	2	0	3	0	1	0	8
Yukon (Scoffin)	1	0	0	1	0	3	0	3	0	1	9

Sheet G	1	2	3	4	5	6	7	8	9	10	11	Final
Prince Edward Island (Gallant) 🔨	1	0	0	0	1	0	0	1	1	0	0	4
Northern Ontario (Carr)	0	0	0	1	0	1	1	0	0	1	2	6

Sheet I	1	2	3	4	5	6	7	8	9	10	11	Final
British Columbia (Wakefield) 🔨	1	0	0	0	2	1	0	0	2	1	0	7
Nova Scotia (Amero)	0	2	1	2	0	0	1	1	0	0	1	8

==== Draw 10 ====
Sheet A	1	2	3	4	5	6	7	8	9	10	11	Final
Northwest Territories (Miller) 🔨	1	1	2	1	0	2	1	1	0	0	0	9
British Columbia (Wakefield)	0	0	0	0	4	0	0	0	3	2	2	11

Sheet D	1	2	3	4	5	6	7	8	9	10	Final
Manitoba (Peters) 🔨	0	0	1	0	2	0	2	0	0	0	5
Newfoundland and Labrador (Thomas)	0	1	0	2	0	2	0	1	0	2	8

Sheet F	1	2	3	4	5	6	7	8	9	10	Final
Nova Scotia (Amero) 🔨	1	1	0	1	0	1	0	0	0	X	4
Prince Edward Island (Gallant)	0	0	2	0	2	0	2	0	1	X	7

==== Draw 11 ====
Sheet A	1	2	3	4	5	6	7	8	9	10	Final
Prince Edward Island (Gallant) 🔨	1	0	0	1	0	0	3	0	0	2	7
Alberta (Sluchinski)	0	1	0	0	2	1	0	2	0	0	6

Sheet D	1	2	3	4	5	6	7	8	9	10	Final
Northern Ontario (Carr) 🔨	2	0	1	0	0	0	0	2	0	0	5
New Brunswick (Rennie)	0	1	0	0	1	0		0	2	1	6

Sheet F	1	2	3	4	5	6	7	8	9	10	Final
Saskatchewan (Jones) 🔨	1	0	2	0	1	0	1	1	0	0	6
Ontario (Fanset)	0	1	0	1	0	1	0	0	1	1	5

Sheet G	1	2	3	4	5	6	7	8	9	10	Final
Quebec (Dion) 🔨	3	1	2	2	0	1	0	2	X	X	11
Northwest Territories (Miller)	0	0	0	0	1	0	1	0	X	X	2

Sheet J	1	2	3	4	5	6	7	8	9	10	Final
Newfoundland and Labrador (Thomas) 🔨	3	1	0	4	0	0	3	X	X	X	11
Yukon (Scoffin)	0	0	1	0	1	1	0	X	X	X	3

==== Draw 12 ====
Sheet B	1	2	3	4	5	6	7	8	9	10	Final
New Brunswick (Rennie) 🔨	0	0	0	0	0	0	1	0	0	X	1
Quebec (Dion)	2	0	0	0	0	0	0	2	1	X	5

Sheet D	1	2	3	4	5	6	7	8	9	10	Final
Alberta (Sluchinski) 🔨	0	1	0	1	0	1	0	2	1	0	6
Saskatchewan (Jones)	0	0	2	0	3	0	2	0	0	3	10

Sheet E	1	2	3	4	5	6	7	8	9	10	Final
Yukon (Scoffin) 🔨	1	0	0	0	2	0	1	0	1	0	5
Nova Scotia (Amero)	0	0	1	1	0	1	0	1	0	2	6

Sheet H	1	2	3	4	5	6	7	8	9	10	Final
British Columbia (Wakefield) 🔨	1	0	0	0	0	0	2	1	0	X	4
Manitoba (Peters)	0	2	1	2	1	1	0	0	2	X	9

Sheet I	1	2	3	4	5	6	7	8	9	10	Final
Ontario (Fanset) 🔨	0	2	0	1	0	0	3	0	2	X	8
Northern Ontario (Carr)	0	0	0	0	2	0	0	2	0	X	4

==== Draw 13 ====
Sheet B	1	2	3	4	5	6	7	8	9	10	Final
Saskatchewan (Jones) 🔨	0	0	2	0	0	0	0	X	X	X	2
Prince Edward Island (Gallant)	0	0	0	2	3	1	1	X	X	X	7

Sheet C	1	2	3	4	5	6	7	8	9	10	Final
Nova Scotia (Amero) 🔨	1	0	2	0	0	0	1	0	1	X	5
Newfoundland and Labrador (Thomas)	0	2	0	1	1	3	0	1	0	X	8

Sheet E	1	2	3	4	5	6	7	8	9	10	11	Final
Quebec (Dion) 🔨	3	0	0	2	0	2	0	0	1	0	1	9
Northern Ontario (Carr)	0	3	1	0	1	0	2	0	0	1	0	8

Sheet J	1	2	3	4	5	6	7	8	9	10	Final
New Brunswick (Rennie) 🔨	1	0	1	0	2	1	0	0	0	0	5
Ontario (Fanset)	0	0	0	1	0	0	4	1	0	1	7

==== Draw 14 ====
Sheet A	1	2	3	4	5	6	7	8	9	10	Final
Yukon (Scoffin) 🔨	1	0	0	1	2	0	2	0	0	X	6
Manitoba (Peters)	0	1	1	0	0	3	0	4	1	X	10

Sheet E	1	2	3	4	5	6	7	8	9	10	Final
Northwest Territories (Miller) 🔨	1	0	0	1	0	0	1	0	0	X	3
New Brunswick (Rennie)	0	0	2	0	2	2	0	4	1	X	11

Sheet G	1	2	3	4	5	6	7	8	9	10	Final
Alberta (Sluchinski) 🔨	0	2	0	0	2	2	1	0	X	X	7
Nova Scotia (Amero)	0	0	1	0	0	0	0	1	X	X	2

Sheet J	1	2	3	4	5	6	7	8	9	10	Final
British Columbia (Wakefield) 🔨	0	0	1	0	0	0	X	X	X	X	1
Quebec (Dion)	1	2	0	3	1	2	X	X	X	X	9

==== Draw 15 ====
Sheet B	1	2	3	4	5	6	7	8	9	10	Final
Ontario (Fanset) 🔨	2	0	0	0	2	0	0	1	1	1	7
Alberta (Sluchinski)	0	2	0	0	0	0	3	0	0	0	5

Sheet D	1	2	3	4	5	6	7	8	9	10	Final
Prince Edward Island (Gallant) 🔨	0	0	0	1	1	0	2	1	1	0	6
Yukon (Scoffin)	0	1	0	0	0	1	0	0	0	0	2

Sheet F	1	2	3	4	5	6	7	8	9	10	Final
Newfoundland and Labrador (Thomas) 🔨	0	2	0	0	2	1	0	0	2	X	7
British Columbia (Wakefield)	1	0	1	1	0	0	1	0	0	X	4

Sheet H	1	2	3	4	5	6	7	8	9	10	Final
Manitoba (Peters) 🔨	1	0	1	0	3	1	0	1	0	0	7
Northwest Territories (Miller)	0	2	0	1	0	0	3	0	1	1	8

Sheet J	1	2	3	4	5	6	7	8	9	10	Final
Northern Ontario (Carr) 🔨	0	2	0	3	1	0	2	0	1	2	11
Saskatchewan (Jones)	1	0	3	0	0	1	0	2	0	0	7

==== Draw 16 ====
Sheet D	1	2	3	4	5	6	7	8	9	10	11	Final
British Columbia (Wakefield) 🔨	1	1	0	3	2	0	0	0	0	1	0	8
Ontario (Fanset)	0	0	0	0	0	1	2	2	3	0	1	9

Sheet F	1	2	3	4	5	6	7	8	9	10	Final
Quebec (Dion) 🔨	1	1	0	0	3	1	0	1	0	X	7
Alberta (Sluchinski)	0	0	3	0	0	0	1	0	1	X	5

Sheet H	1	2	3	4	5	6	7	8	9	10	Final
New Brunswick (Rennie) 🔨	0	1	0	0	0	0	1	0	X	X	2
Prince Edward Island (Gallant)	1	0	0	2	1	1	0	2	X	X	7

Sheet J	1	2	3	4	5	6	7	8	9	10	Final
Nova Scotia (Amero) 🔨	0	1	1	1	0	0	4	1	0	X	8
Northwest Territories (Miller)	0	0	0	0	1	1	0	0	2	X	4

==== Draw 17 ====
Sheet A	1	2	3	4	5	6	7	8	9	10	Final
Newfoundland and Labrador (Thomas) 🔨	1	1	2	0	1	0	2	0	2	X	9
New Brunswick (Rennie)	0	0	0	3	0	1	0	2	0	X	6

Sheet C	1	2	3	4	5	6	7	8	9	10	Final
Northwest Territories (Miller) 🔨	0	0	1	0	1	0	1	0	X	X	3
Saskatchewan (Jones)	1	3	0	1	0	3	0	2	X	X	10

Sheet F	1	2	3	4	5	6	7	8	9	10	Final
Manitoba (Peters) 🔨	0	0	1	0	2	1	0	1	0	X	5
Northern Ontario (Carr)	0	1	0	2	0	0	4	0	1	X	8

Sheet G	1	2	3	4	5	6	7	8	9	10	Final
Ontario (Fanset) 🔨	1	0	0	0	0	3	1	0	0	X	5
Yukon (Scoffin)	0	2	1	2	1	0	0	1	1	X	8

==== Draw 18 ====
Sheet A	1	2	3	4	5	6	7	8	9	10	Final
Northern Ontario (Carr) 🔨	0	1	0	0	1	0	2	0	2	1	7
Nova Scotia (Amero)	0	0	1	1	0	2	0	2	0	0	6

Sheet C	1	2	3	4	5	6	7	8	9	10	Final
Yukon (Scoffin) 🔨	1	0	1	0	1	1	0	0	0	X	4
Quebec (Dion)	0	1	0	2	0	0	2	2	2	X	9

Sheet E	1	2	3	4	5	6	7	8	9	10	Final
Prince Edward Island (Gallant) 🔨	2	0	3	0	1	0	0	0	1	X	7
British Columbia (Wakefield)	0	2	0	1	0	1	1	1	0	X	6

Sheet G	1	2	3	4	5	6	7	8	9	10	Final
Saskatchewan (Jones) 🔨	0	1	1	0	0	1	0	1	1	X	5
Newfoundland and Labrador (Thomas)	0	0	0	0	1	0	1	0	0	X	2

Sheet I	1	2	3	4	5	6	7	8	9	10	Final
Alberta (Sluchinski) 🔨	0	2	0	0	2	0	1	1	0	1	7
Manitoba (Peters)	1	0	0	1	0	2	0	0	1	0	5

=== Playoffs ===
Tiebreaker		Semifinal		Final
Saskatchewan	2
Ontario	7	Prince Edward Island	3
		Ontario	4
				Quebec	8
				Ontario	6

==== Tiebreaker ====
Sheet B	1	2	3	4	5	6	7	8	9	10	Final
Ontario (Fanset)	0	0	2	1	0	1	0	2	1	X	7
Saskatchewan (Jones) 🔨	0	1	0	0	0	0	1	0	0	X	2

Player percentages
Ontario		Saskatchewan	
Christopher Jay	74%	Dallan Muyres	85%
Geoff Chambers	89%	DJ Kidby	76%
Craig Van Ymeren	79%	Mitch Criton	67%
Travis Fanset	83%	Brennen Jones	59%
Total	81%	Total	72%

==== Semi final ====
Sheet A	1	2	3	4	5	6	7	8	9	10	Final
Prince Edward Island (Gallant) 🔨	0	0	1	0	0	0	1	0	1	0	3
Ontario (Fanset)	0	1	0	0	0	0	0	2	0	1	4

Player percentages
Prince Edward Island		Ontario	
Alex MacFadyen	83%	Christopher Jay	68%
Anson Carmody	60%	Geoff Chambers	71%
Adam Casey	76%	Craig Van Ymeren	90%
Brett Gallant	76%	Travis Fanset	72%
Total	74%	Total	75%

==== Final ====
Sheet B	1	2	3	4	5	6	7	8	9	10	Final
Ontario (Fanset)	0	1	0	1	0	1	0	0	2	1	6
Quebec (Dion) 🔨	1	0	3	0	1	0	2	1	0	0	8

Player percentages
Ontario		Quebec	
Christopher Jay	85%	Miquel Bernard	72%
Geoff Chambers	65%	Erik Lachance	81%
Craig Van Ymeren	76%	Jean-Michel Arsenault	80%
Travis Fanset	66%	William Dion	75%
Total	73%	Total	77%

== Women's ==
=== Teams ===
Province / Territory	Skip	Third	Second	Lead
Alberta	Maria Bushell	Jenn Liner	Jody Keim	Heather Rogers
British Columbia	Kelly Thompson	Kelly Shimizu	Cynthia Lu	Jennifer Allen
Manitoba	Kaitlyn Lawes	Jenna Loder	Liz Peters	Sarah Wazney
New Brunswick	Mary Jane McGuire	Megan McGuire	Ashlyn Dickinson	Kaitlin Stubbs
Newfoundland and Labrador	Julie Devereaux	Stephanie Davis	Jessica Mouland	Erica Trickett
Northern Ontario	Ashley Miharija	Sarah Lang	Jenna Enge	Jessica Williams
Northwest Territories	Valisa Aho	Kourtney Williams	Ashley Williams	Paige Scott
Nova Scotia	Danielle Parsons	Katie Lines	Courtney Huestis	Jane Snyder
Ontario	Danielle Inglis	Chantal Lalonde	Tracy O'Leary	Pam Feldkamp
Prince Edward Island	Erin Carmody	Geri-Lynn Ramsay	Lisa Moerike	Jess van Ouwerkerk
Quebec	Kristen Richard	Alanna Routledge	Brittany O'Rourke	Sasha Beauchamp
Saskatchewan	Stephanie McVicar	Kari Kennedy	Ashley Gregoire	Cori Debert
Yukon	Chelsea Duncan	Sarah Koltun (skip)	Linea Eby	Tessa Vibe

=== Standings ===
Locale	Skip	W	L
Manitoba	Kaitlyn Lawes	10	2
Nova Scotia	Danielle Parsons	9	3
Northern Ontario	Ashley Miharija	8	4
Alberta	Maria Bushell	8	4
Saskatchewan	Stephanie McVicar	8	4
New Brunswick	Mary Jane McGuire	7	5
Quebec	Kristen Richard	7	5
Ontario	Danielle Inglis	6	6
Prince Edward Island	Erin Carmody	5	7
Newfoundland and Labrador	Julie Devereaux	5	7
British Columbia	Kelly Thompson	4	8
Northwest Territories	Valisa Aho	1	11
Yukon	Sarah Koltun	0	12

=== Results ===
==== Draw 1 ====
Sheet B	1	2	3	4	5	6	7	8	9	10	Final
Northwest Territories (Aho) 🔨	0	0	1	0	0	1	X	X	X	X	2
Northern Ontario (Miharija)	2	1	0	5	3	0	X	X	X	X	11

Sheet F	1	2	3	4	5	6	7	8	9	10	Final
Manitoba (Lawes) 🔨	2	0	0	4	0	0	3	0	X	X	9
Quebec (Richard)	0	0	0	0	1	1	0	2	X	X	4

Sheet H	1	2	3	4	5	6	7	8	9	10	Final
Yukon (Koltun) 🔨	1	1	0	0	1	1	0	0	1	0	5
British Columbia (Thompson)	0	0	1	3	0	0	1	3	0	5	13

Sheet J	1	2	3	4	5	6	7	8	9	10	Final
Saskatchewan (McVicar) 🔨	2	0	1	1	1	0	3	0	0	1	9
Nova Scotia (Parsons)	0	1	0	0	0	3	0	2	1	0	7

==== Draw 2 ====
Sheet B	1	2	3	4	5	6	7	8	9	10	Final
Ontario (Inglis) 🔨	2	0	3	0	1	1	1	0	1	X	9
Prince Edward Island (Carmody)	0	2	0	1	0	0	0	2	0	X	5

Sheet D	1	2	3	4	5	6	7	8	9	10	Final
Newfoundland and Labrador (Devereaux) 🔨	0	0	2	1	0	2	3	3	X	X	11
Northwest Territories (Aho)	2	2	0	0	1	0	0	0	X	X	5

Sheet F	1	2	3	4	5	6	7	8	9	10	Final
New Brunswick (McGuire) 🔨	1	0	0	1	0	0	2	0	1	0	5
Saskatchewan (McVicar)	0	1	0	0	1	0	0	3	0	3	8

Sheet J	1	2	3	4	5	6	7	8	9	10	Final
Alberta (Bushell) 🔨	1	3	1	0	4	0	X	X	X	X	9
Yukon (Koltun)	0	0	0	2	0	1	X	X	X	X	3

==== Draw 3 ====
Sheet A	1	2	3	4	5	6	7	8	9	10	11	Final
Nova Scotia (Parsons) 🔨	0	1	0	0	1	0	1	0	1	1	1	6
Manitoba (Lawes)	0	0	2	1	0	1	0	1	0	0	0	5

Sheet C	1	2	3	4	5	6	7	8	9	10	Final
Northern Ontario (Miharija) 🔨	0	1	1	0	2	0	2	5	X	X	11
Alberta (Bushell)	1	0	0	2	0	1	0	0	X	X	4

Sheet E	1	2	3	4	5	6	7	8	9	10	Final
Prince Edward Island (Carmody) 🔨	1	0	4	0	4	1	X	X	X	X	10
Newfoundland and Labrador (Devereaux)	0	0	0	2	0	0	X	X	X	X	2

Sheet G	1	2	3	4	5	6	7	8	9	10	Final
Quebec (Richard) 🔨	1	0	0	1	1	0	0	1	0	1	5
Ontario (Inglis)	0	1	0	0	0	2	1	0	0	0	4

Sheet I	1	2	3	4	5	6	7	8	9	10	Final
British Columbia (Thompson) 🔨	1	0	2	0	2	0	1	3	X	X	9
New Brunswick (McGuire)	0	1	0	1	0	1	0	0	X	X	3

==== Draw 4 ====
Sheet B	1	2	3	4	5	6	7	8	9	10	Final
Saskatchewan (McVicar) 🔨	1	0	0	1	0	1	0	1	0	X	4
Manitoba (Lawes)	0	0	1	0	2	0	3	0	1	X	7

Sheet D	1	2	3	4	5	6	7	8	9	10	Final
Quebec (Richard) 🔨	1	4	3	0	0	4	X	X	X	X	12
Prince Edward Island (Carmody)	0	0	0	1	1	0	X	X	X	X	2

Sheet F	1	2	3	4	5	6	7	8	9	10	Final
Northern Ontario (Miharija) 🔨	2	2	1	0	0	2	3	0	4	X	14
Yukon (Koltun)	0	0	0	2	1	0	0	1	0	X	4

Sheet G	1	2	3	4	5	6	7	8	9	10	Final
Alberta (Bushell) 🔨	1	2	4	2	3	3	X	X	X	X	15
British Columbia (Thompson)	0	0	0	0	0	0	X	X	X	X	0

Sheet I	1	2	3	4	5	6	7	8	9	10	Final
Ontario (Inglis) 🔨	0	2	1	1	0	3	1	0	X	X	8
Newfoundland and Labrador (Devereaux)	0	0	0	0	1	0	0	1	X	X	2

==== Draw 5 ====
Sheet C	1	2	3	4	5	6	7	8	9	10	11	Final
New Brunswick (McGuire) 🔨	0	0	2	0	1	1	0	0	1	0	1	6
Nova Scotia (Parsons)	0	0	0	2	0	0	1	1	0	1	0	5

Sheet F	1	2	3	4	5	6	7	8	9	10	Final
British Columbia (Thompson) 🔨	0	1	0	0	3	0	4	0	1	X	9
Saskatchewan (McVicar)	1	0	0	1	0	1	0	1	0	X	4

Sheet J	1	2	3	4	5	6	7	8	9	10	Final
Prince Edward Island (Carmody) 🔨	0	5	4	0	0	3	X	X	X	X	12
Northwest Territories (Aho)	1	0	0	1	1	0	X	X	X	X	3

==== Draw 6 ====
Sheet A	1	2	3	4	5	6	7	8	9	10	Final
Northwest Territories (Aho) 🔨	0	0	0	0	1	0	X	X	X	X	1
Alberta (Bushell)	3	3	1	2	0	3	X	X	X	X	12

Sheet D	1	2	3	4	5	6	7	8	9	10	Final
Manitoba (Lawes) 🔨	2	0	1	0	0	3	2	1	1	X	10
Ontario (Inglis)	0	1	0	3	0	0	0	0	0	X	4

Sheet E	1	2	3	4	5	6	7	8	9	10	Final
Nova Scotia (Parsons) 🔨	1	0	0	1	0	0	1	1	0	1	5
Quebec (Richard)	0	0	1	0	0	1	0	0	1	0	3

Sheet G	1	2	3	4	5	6	7	8	9	10	Final
Newfoundland and Labrador (Devereaux) 🔨	0	0	0	0	1	0	3	0	2	0	6
Northern Ontario (Miharija)	0	1	0	1	0	5	0	2	0	1	10

Sheet J	1	2	3	4	5	6	7	8	9	10	Final
Yukon (Koltun) 🔨	1	0	0	0	1	0	0	1	X	X	3
New Brunswick (McGuire)	0	4	1	1	0	1	3	0	X	X	10

==== Draw 7 ====
Sheet A	1	2	3	4	5	6	7	8	9	10	Final
Yukon (Koltun) 🔨	0	0	2	0	0	1	0	1	0	X	4
Saskatchewan (McVicar)	0	1	0	1	1	0	3	0	1	X	7

Sheet C	1	2	3	4	5	6	7	8	9	10	Final
Ontario (Inglis) 🔨	5	2	1	0	1	2	X	X	X	X	11
Northwest Territories (Aho)	0	0	0	1	0	0	X	X	X	X	1

Sheet F	1	2	3	4	5	6	7	8	9	10	Final
Newfoundland and Labrador (Devereaux) 🔨	0	0	4	0	2	0	1	0	0	X	7
Alberta (Bushell)	2	2	0	1	0	2	0	1	1	X	9

Sheet H	1	2	3	4	5	6	7	8	9	10	Final
New Brunswick (McGuire) 🔨	1	1	0	1	0	0	1	0	1	X	5
Manitoba (Lawes)	0	0	1	0	3	1	0	1	0	X	6

==== Draw 8 ====
Sheet D	1	2	3	4	5	6	7	8	9	10	Final
Northern Ontario (Miharija) 🔨	1	1	0	2	2	0	0	1	3	X	10
British Columbia (Thompson)	0	0	1	0	0	1	1	0	0	X	3

Sheet F	1	2	3	4	5	6	7	8	9	10	Final
Nova Scotia (Parsons) 🔨	0	0	3	0	0	1	0	2	0	1	7
Ontario (Inglis)	1	0	0	3	0	0	2	0	0	0	6

Sheet G	1	2	3	4	5	6	7	8	9	10	11	Final
Saskatchewan (McVicar) 🔨	0	0	0	0	0	1	0	1	0	2	1	5
Quebec (Richard)	0	0	0	0	2	0	1	0	1	0	0	4

Sheet I	1	2	3	4	5	6	7	8	9	10	11	Final
Manitoba (Lawes) 🔨	0	0	1	0	1	0	1	0	1	1	1	6
Prince Edward Island (Carmody)	1	0	0	1	0	1	0	2	0	0	0	5

==== Draw 9 ====
Sheet B	1	2	3	4	5	6	7	8	9	10	Final
Quebec (Richard) 🔨	0	1	0	0	0	3	0	2	0	0	6
Newfoundland and Labrador (Devereaux)	1	0	0	1	0	0	4	0	0	2	8

Sheet D	1	2	3	4	5	6	7	8	9	10	Final
Alberta (Bushell) 🔨	0	0	1	0	0	0	1	0	1	X	3
New Brunswick (McGuire)	1	1	0	1	1	1	0	2	0	X	7

Sheet E	1	2	3	4	5	6	7	8	9	10	Final
Northwest Territories (Aho) 🔨	1	0	0	3	2	0	1	1	0	X	8
Yukon (Koltun)	0	1	1	0	0	2	0	0	1	X	5

Sheet H	1	2	3	4	5	6	7	8	9	10	11	Final
Prince Edward Island (Carmody) 🔨	1	0	1	0	2	0	2	0	0	2	0	8
Northern Ontario (Miharija)	0	1	0	1	0	3	0	2	1	0	1	9

Sheet J	1	2	3	4	5	6	7	8	9	10	Final
British Columbia (Thompson) 🔨	0	0	0	1	0	2	0	0	1	0	4
Nova Scotia (Parsons)	0	0	0	0	2	0	0	2	0	1	5

==== Draw 10 ====
Sheet B	1	2	3	4	5	6	7	8	9	10	Final
Northwest Territories (Aho) 🔨	0	0	0	0	3	0	0	1	X	X	4
British Columbia (Thompson)	1	1	2	1	0	4	1	0	X	X	10

Sheet C	1	2	3	4	5	6	7	8	9	10	Final
Manitoba (Lawes) 🔨	3	0	3	0	4	1	X	X	X	X	11
Newfoundland and Labrador (Devereaux)	0	1	0	2	0	0	X	X	X	X	3

Sheet E	1	2	3	4	5	6	7	8	9	10	Final
Nova Scotia (Parsons) 🔨	4	0	1	1	0	2	0	3	X	X	11
Prince Edward Island (Carmody)	0	1	0	0	1	0	1	0	X	X	3

==== Draw 11 ====
Sheet B	1	2	3	4	5	6	7	8	9	10	Final
Prince Edward Island (Carmody) 🔨	2	1	0	0	0	1	1	0	0	X	5
Alberta (Bushell)	0	0	4	2	2	0	0	0	2	X	10

Sheet C	1	2	3	4	5	6	7	8	9	10	Final
Northern Ontario (Miharija) 🔨	0	2	0	0	1	0	1	0	1	0	5
New Brunswick (McGuire)	1	0	1	1	0	1	0	1	0	1	6

Sheet E	1	2	3	4	5	6	7	8	9	10	Final
Saskatchewan (McVicar) 🔨	0	2	0	0	2	0	1	0	0	3	8
Ontario (Inglis)	0	0	2	1	0	2	0	1	0	0	6

Sheet H	1	2	3	4	5	6	7	8	9	10	Final
Quebec (Richard) 🔨	3	0	2	3	3	2	X	X	X	X	13
Northwest Territories (Aho)	0	1	0	0	0	0	X	X	X	X	1

Sheet I	1	2	3	4	5	6	7	8	9	10	Final
Newfoundland and Labrador (Devereaux) 🔨	1	0	1	1	0	0	1	1	0	1	6
Yukon (Koltun)	0	1	0	0	0	2	0	0	1	0	4

==== Draw 12 ====
Sheet A	1	2	3	4	5	6	7	8	9	10	Final
New Brunswick (McGuire)	3	0	2	0	1	0	2	0	1	X	9
Quebec (Richard) 🔨	0	1	0	2	0	2	0	2	0	X	7

Sheet C	1	2	3	4	5	6	7	8	9	10	Final
Alberta (Bushell) 🔨	0	0	0	0	1	0	1	1	0	3	6
Saskatchewan (McVicar)	0	1	1	1	0	1	0	0	1	0	5

Sheet F	1	2	3	4	5	6	7	8	9	10	Final
Yukon (Koltun) 🔨	2	1	0	1	0	0	1	0	1	X	6
Nova Scotia (Parsons)	0	0	2	0	1	2	0	5	0	X	10

Sheet G	1	2	3	4	5	6	7	8	9	10	Final
British Columbia (Thompson) 🔨	0	1	0	0	1	0	0	0	2	X	4
Manitoba (Lawes)	0	0	0	3	0	1	1	1	0	X	6

Sheet J	1	2	3	4	5	6	7	8	9	10	Final
Ontario (Inglis) 🔨	1	0	2	1	3	0	0	0	3	X	10
Northern Ontario (Miharija)	0	1	0	0	0	1	1	1	0	X	4

==== Draw 13 ====
Sheet A	1	2	3	4	5	6	7	8	9	10	Final
Saskatchewan (McVicar) 🔨	0	0	1	0	1	2	1	1	0	X	6
Prince Edward Island (Carmody)	0	1	0	1	0	0	0	0	1	X	3

Sheet D	1	2	3	4	5	6	7	8	9	10	Final
Nova Scotia (Parsons) 🔨	2	0	1	0	2	0	1	0	0	1	7
Newfoundland and Labrador (Devereaux)	0	1	0	2	0	1	0	1	0	0	5

Sheet F	1	2	3	4	5	6	7	8	9	10	Final
Quebec (Richard) 🔨	0	1	3	0	0	0	2	0	2	1	9
Northern Ontario (Miharija)	0	0	0	2	1	1	0	2	0	0	6

Sheet I	1	2	3	4	5	6	7	8	9	10	Final
New Brunswick (McGuire) 🔨	1	1	2	1	0	4	X	X	X	X	9
Ontario (Inglis)	0	0	0	0	1	0	X	X	X	X	1

==== Draw 14 ====
Sheet B	1	2	3	4	5	6	7	8	9	10	Final
Yukon (Koltun) 🔨	1	0	1	0	1	0	0	1	0	X	4
Manitoba (Lawes)	0	3	0	2	0	2	0	0	2	X	9

Sheet F	1	2	3	4	5	6	7	8	9	10	Final
Northwest Territories (Aho) 🔨	0	0	0	0	0	1	X	X	X	X	1
New Brunswick (McGuire)	2	2	3	2	2	0	X	X	X	X	11

Sheet H	1	2	3	4	5	6	7	8	9	10	Final
Alberta (Bushell) 🔨	1	0	1	1	0	0	0	0	2	X	5
Nova Scotia (Parsons)	0	0	0	0	0	3	1	2	0	X	6

Sheet I	1	2	3	4	5	6	7	8	9	10	Final
British Columbia (Thompson) 🔨	0	1	0	2	0	0	0	0	2	X	5
Quebec (Richard)	0	0	2	0	2	1	1	1	0	X	7

==== Draw 15 ====
Sheet A	1	2	3	4	5	6	7	8	9	10	Final
Ontario (Inglis) 🔨	1	0	1	1	2	0	1	0	0	0	6
Alberta (Bushell)	0	1	0	0	0	2	0	3	0	1	7

Sheet C	1	2	3	4	5	6	7	8	9	10	Final
Prince Edward Island (Carmody) 🔨	2	1	0	2	0	1	0	0	3	0	9
Yukon (Koltun)	0	0	2	0	0	0	3	1	0	0	6

Sheet E	1	2	3	4	5	6	7	8	9	10	Final
Newfoundland and Labrador (Devereaux) 🔨	1	0	0	1	2	0	2	1	2	X	9
British Columbia (Thompson)	0	0	2	0	0	2	0	0	0	X	4

Sheet G	1	2	3	4	5	6	7	8	9	10	Final
Manitoba (Lawes) 🔨	3	1	2	0	0	4	X	X	X	X	10
Northwest Territories (Aho)	0	0	0	1	1	0	X	X	X	X	2

Sheet I	1	2	3	4	5	6	7	8	9	10	Final
Northern Ontario (Miharija) 🔨	0	0	1	0	0	0	1	1	0	1	4
Saskatchewan (McVicar)	0	0	0	1	0	1	0	0	1	0	3

==== Draw 16 ====
Sheet C	1	2	3	4	5	6	7	8	9	10	Final
British Columbia (Thompson) 🔨	0	0	3	0	0	0	0	1	0	0	4
Ontario (Inglis)	0	2	0	0	2	1	0	0	2	0	7

Sheet E	1	2	3	4	5	6	7	8	9	10	Final
Quebec (Richard) 🔨	0	1	0	0	1	0	2	2	0	X	6
Alberta (Bushell)	0	0	1	1	0	1	0	0	1	X	4

Sheet G	1	2	3	4	5	6	7	8	9	10	Final
New Brunswick (McGuire) 🔨	1	0	0	1	0	0	0	1	0	X	3
Prince Edward Island (Carmody)	0	2	1	0	0	2	1	0	2	X	8

Sheet I	1	2	3	4	5	6	7	8	9	10	Final
Nova Scotia (Parsons) 🔨	1	2	0	4	1	0	X	X	X	X	8
Northwest Territories (Aho)	0	0	1	0	0	1	X	X	X	X	2

==== Draw 17 ====
Sheet B	1	2	3	4	5	6	7	8	9	10	Final
Newfoundland and Labrador (Devereaux) 🔨	1	0	0	1	0	2	0	3	0	2	9
New Brunswick (McGuire)	0	2	0	0	4	0	1	0	1	0	8

Sheet D	1	2	3	4	5	6	7	8	9	10	Final
Northwest Territories (Aho) 🔨	2	0	0	0	2	0	X	X	X	X	4
Saskatchewan (McVicar)	0	4	2	5	0	3	X	X	X	X	14

Sheet E	1	2	3	4	5	6	7	8	9	10	Final
Manitoba (Lawes) 🔨	2	0	2	0	0	4	0	2	0	X	10
Northern Ontario (Miharija)	0	1	0	1	2	0	2	0	2	X	8

Sheet H	1	2	3	4	5	6	7	8	9	10	Final
Ontario (Inglis) 🔨	2	0	0	4	1	0	2	0	X	X	9
Yukon (Koltun)	0	0	1	0	0	1	0	1	X	X	3

==== Draw 18 ====
Sheet B	1	2	3	4	5	6	7	8	9	10	Final
Northern Ontario (Miharija) 🔨	2	0	1	0	1	1	1	1	0	0	7
Nova Scotia (Parsons)	0	3	0	1	0	0	0	0	1	1	6

Sheet D	1	2	3	4	5	6	7	8	9	10	Final
Yukon (Koltun) 🔨	0	0	1	0	0	0	0	1	0	0	2
Quebec (Richard)	0	0	0	2	1	1	1	0	1	0	6

Sheet F	1	2	3	4	5	6	7	8	9	10	11	Final
Prince Edward Island (Carmody) 🔨	1	2	0	0	2	0	0	1	0	2	2	10
British Columbia (Thompson)	0	0	3	3	0	1	0	0	1	0	0	8

Sheet H	1	2	3	4	5	6	7	8	9	10	Final
Saskatchewan (McVicar) 🔨	0	0	1	0	0	1	0	2	1	1	6
Newfoundland and Labrador (Devereaux)	1	0	0	1	2	0	1	0	0	0	5

Sheet J	1	2	3	4	5	6	7	8	9	10	Final
Alberta (Bushell) 🔨	1	0	3	1	0	1	0	2	0	X	8
Manitoba (Lawes)	0	1	0	0	1	0	2	0	1	X	5

=== Playoffs ===
Tiebreaker #1
Alberta	7
Saskatchewan	8

Tiebreaker #2
Northern Ontario	5
Saskatchewan	6

Semifinal
Nova Scotia	7
Saskatchewan	8

Final
Manitoba	7
Saskatchewan	6

==== Tiebreaker #1 ====
Sheet E	1	2	3	4	5	6	7	8	9	10	11	Final
Saskatchewan (McVicar)	0	0	2	2	0	2	0	1	0	0	1	8
Alberta (Bushell) 🔨	0	2	0	0	2	0	2	0	0	1	0	7

Player percentages
Saskatchewan		Alberta	
Cori Debert	69%	Heather Rogers	70%
Ashley Gregoire	68%	Jody Keim	73%
Kari Kennedy	64%	Jenn Liner	75%
Stephanie McVicar	73%	Maria Bushell	74%
Total	68%	Total	73%

==== Tiebreaker #2 ====
Sheet A	1	2	3	4	5	6	7	8	9	10	Final
Saskatchewan (McVicar)	0	1	3	0	1	0	0	1	0	0	6
Northern Ontario (Miharija) 🔨	0	0	0	1	0	1	1	0	1	1	5

Player percentages
Saskatchewan		Northern Ontario	
Cori Debert	89%	Jessica Williams	96%
Ashley Gregoire	81%	Jenna Enge	81%
Kari Kennedy	76%	Sarah Lang	86%
Stephanie McVicar	92%	Ashley Miharija	71%
Total	85%	Total	84%

==== Semi final ====
Sheet B	1	2	3	4	5	6	7	8	9	10	Final
Saskatchewan (McVicar)	0	1	0	2	0	2	0	1	0	2	8
Nova Scotia (Parsons) 🔨	2	0	1	0	1	0	2	0	1	0	7

Player percentages
Saskatchewan		Nova Scotia	
Cori Debert	88%	Jane Snyder	86%
Ashley Gregoire	70%	Courtney Huestis	59%
Kari Kennedy	69%	Katie Lines	65%
Stephanie McVicar	76%	Danielle Parsons	68%
Total	76%	Total	69%

==== Final ====
Sheet A	1	2	3	4	5	6	7	8	9	10	Final
Manitoba (Lawes) 🔨	0	3	0	3	0	0	0	1	0	X	7
Saskatchewan (McVicar)	0	0	1	0	2	1	1	0	1	X	6

Player percentages
Manitoba		Saskatchewan	
Sarah Wazney	84%	Cori Debert	84%
Liz Peters	76%	Ashley Gregoire	78%
Jenna Loder	80%	Kari Kennedy	74%
Kaitlyn Lawes	80%	Stephanie McVicar	69%
Total	80%	Total	76%

== Qualification ==
=== Ontario ===
The Pepsi Ontario Junior Curling Championships were held January 2–6 at the Coldwater & District Curling Club in Coldwater.

Danielle Inglis of Burlington defeated Rachel Homan from the Ottawa Curling Club 5-4 in the women's final. To make it to the final, Homan had to win a tiebreaker match against Katie Morrissey of the Rideau Curling Club and then Hollie Nicol of Kitchener-Waterloo 6-5 in the semifinal.

In the men's final, Travis Fanset out of St. Thomas defeated Neil Sinclair of Manotick 9-8. Sinclair won his semifinal match against the Carleton Heights Curling Club's Christian Tolusso.
