= 2014 Quebec Men's Provincial Curling Championship =

2014 Provincial Tankard
- Host city: Val-d'Or, Quebec
- Arena: Club de curling Desjardins
- Dates: January 11–19
- Winner: Jean-Michel Ménard
- Curling club: CC Etchemin, Saint-Romuald
- Skip: Jean-Michel Ménard
- Third: Martin Crête
- Second: Éric Sylvain
- Lead: Philippe Ménard
- Finalist: Philippe Lemay

The 2014 Quebec Men's Provincial Curling Championship, also known as the Quebec Tankard, was held from January 11 to 19 at the Club de curling Desjardins in Val-d'Or, Quebec. The winning Jean-Michel Ménard rink from Saint-Romuald represented Quebec at the 2014 Tim Hortons Brier in Kamloops, British Columbia.

== Qualification ==
Qualification method	Berths	Qualifying team(s)
Provincial Tour Champion	1	Jean-Michel Ménard
West Zone	3	Robert Desjardins; Steeve Gagnon; Denis Robichaud
East Zone	3	Mike Fournier; François Gagné; Alexandre Ferland
Tour Qualifiers	3	Philippe Lemay; Martin Ferland; Serge Reid

== Teams ==
Skip	Third	Second	Lead	Alternate	Club(s)
Alexandre Ferland	Jean-David Boulanger	Steeve Otis	Jean-Philippe Reid	Joey Asselin	Club de curling Kénogami, Jonquière; Club de curling Victoria, Sainte-Foy
Robert Desjardins	Frederic Lawton	Pierre-Luc Morissette	Miguel Bernard	Martin Lavoie	Baie-d'Urfé Curling Club, Baie-d'Urfé; TMR Curling Club, Mont-Royal
Mike Fournier	François Gionest	Yannick Martel	Jean-François Charest	René Dubois	Club de curling Riverbend, Alma; Club de curling Kénogami, Jonquière
François Gagné	Steven Munroe	Philippe Brassard	Christian Bouchard		Club de curling Longue-Pointe, Montreal; Club de curling Etchemin, Saint-Romuald
Steeve Gagnon	Martin Roy	Mike Coolidge	Olivier Beaulieu		Rosemère Curling Club, Rosemère; Glenmore Curling Club, Dollard-des-Ormeaux
Philippe Lemay	Mathieu Beaufort	Jean-Michel Arsenault	Erik Lachance		Club de curling Trois-Rivières, Trois-Rivières
Martin Ferland	François Roberge	Shawn Fowler	Maxime Elmaleh		Club de curling Laviolette, Trois-Rivières; Club de curling Etchemin, Saint-Romuald; Club de curling Danville, Danville
Jean-Michel Ménard	Martin Crête	Eric Sylvain	Philippe Ménard		Club de curling Etchemin, Saint-Romuald
Serge Reid	Simon Dupuis	Maurice Cayouette	Louis Biron		Club de curling Kénogami, Jonquière; Club de curling Thurso, Thurso; Brownsburg Curling Club, Brownsburg-Chatham; Glenmore Curling Club, Dollard-des-Ormeaux
Denis Robichaud	Jean-François Trépanier	Martin Trépanier	Pierre-Luc Trépanier	François Hallé	Club de curling Aurèle-Racine, Sorel-Tracy; Club de curling Valleyfield, Salaberry-de-Valleyfield

== Round-robin standings ==
Final round-robin standings

Key
Teams to Playoffs
Teams to Tiebreaker

Skip (Club)	W	L	PF	PA
Philippe Lemay (Trois-Rivières)	7	2	57	46
Jean-Michel Ménard (Etchemin)	7	2	68	46
Mike Fournier (Riverbend/Kénogami)	6	3	61	40
Martin Ferland (Laviolette/Etchemin/Danville)	6	3	55	40
Steeve Gagnon (Rosemère/Glenmore)	6	3	64	51
François Gagné (Longue-Pointe/Etchemin)	4	5	54	46
Robert Desjardins (Baie-d'Urfé/TMR)	4	5	56	59
Denis Robichaud (Aurèle-Racine/Valleyfield)	3	6	48	58
Alexandre Ferland (Kénogami/Victoria)	1	8	30	78
Serge Reid (Kénogami/Thurso/Brownsburg/Glenmore)	1	8	42	72

== Round-robin results ==
=== Draw 1 ===
Sunday, January 12, 8:15

Sheet A	1	2	3	4	5	6	7	8	9	10	Final
Denis Robichaud	0	0	0	1	0	1	0	0	1	1	4
Steeve Gagnon	0	1	1	0	1	0	1	1	0	0	5

Sheet B	1	2	3	4	5	6	7	8	9	10	Final
Robert Desjardins	2	0	2	0	0	0	3	0	1	X	8
Mike Fournier	0	1	0	0	0	3	0	2	0	X	6

Sheet C	1	2	3	4	5	6	7	8	9	10	Final
François Gagné	0	0	1	0	2	0	0	0	0	X	3
Philippe Lemay	0	1	0	2	0	2	0	1	1	X	7

Sheet D	1	2	3	4	5	6	7	8	9	10	Final
Alexandre Ferland	0	2	0	1	0	1	0	1	0	2	7
Serge Reid	0	0	1	0	2	0	1	0	2	0	6

=== Draw 2 ===
Sunday, January 12, 15:00

Sheet A	1	2	3	4	5	6	7	8	9	10	Final
François Gagné	0	1	0	2	1	0	0	0	1	0	5
Jean-Michel Ménard	2	0	1	0	0	2	1	2	0	1	9

Sheet B	1	2	3	4	5	6	7	8	9	10	Final
Serge Reid	0	1	1	1	0	1	0	3	0	0	7
Denis Robichaud	1	0	0	0	2	0	3	0	2	3	11

Sheet C	1	2	3	4	5	6	7	8	9	10	Final
Steeve Gagnon	2	0	4	1	0	1	2	X	X	X	10
Alexandre Ferland	0	1	0	0	2	0	0	X	X	X	3

Sheet D	1	2	3	4	5	6	7	8	9	10	Final
Robert Desjardins	0	2	0	2	0	1	0	0	1	0	6
Martin Ferland	0	0	2	0	2	0	1	1	0	1	7

=== Draw 3 ===
Monday, January 13, 8:15

Sheet A	1	2	3	4	5	6	7	8	9	10	Final
Serge Reid	0	2	0	1	0	0	2	0	X	X	5
Robert Desjardins	0	0	3	0	0	2	0	5	X	X	10

Sheet B	1	2	3	4	5	6	7	8	9	10	Final
Martin Ferland	2	3	0	0	3	1	X	X	X	X	9
Alexandre Ferland	0	0	1	0	0	0	X	X	X	X	1

Sheet C	1	2	3	4	5	6	7	8	9	10	11	Final
Jean-Michel Ménard	0	0	0	3	2	0	1	0	2	0	1	9
Denis Robichaud	0	1	1	0	0	1	0	3	0	2	0	8

Sheet D	1	2	3	4	5	6	7	8	9	10	Final
Steeve Gagnon	2	0	1	0	2	0	1	1	0	2	9
François Gagné	0	2	0	2	0	2	0	0	2	0	8

=== Draw 4 ===
Monday, January 13, 15:45

Sheet A	1	2	3	4	5	6	7	8	9	10	Final
Martin Ferland	2	1	2	0	3	X	X	X	X	X	8
Denis Robichaud	0	0	0	1	0	X	X	X	X	X	1

Sheet B	1	2	3	4	5	6	7	8	9	10	Final
Philippe Lemay	1	0	2	0	0	0	2	0	1	1	7
Serge Reid	0	1	0	1	0	1	0	1	0	0	4

Sheet C	1	2	3	4	5	6	7	8	9	10	Final
Mike Fournier	1	2	0	0	1	0	1	0	2	X	7
Steeve Gagnon	0	0	1	0	0	2	0	2	0	X	5

Sheet D	1	2	3	4	5	6	7	8	9	10	Final
Alexandre Ferland	0	1	0	2	0	X	X	X	X	X	3
Jean-Michel Ménard	4	0	3	0	4	X	X	X	X	X	11

=== Draw 5 ===
Tuesday, January 14, 12:00

Sheet A	1	2	3	4	5	6	7	8	9	10	Final
Alexandre Ferland	0	2	0	0	1	0	1	0	X	X	4
Philippe Lemay	0	0	0	1	0	4	0	3	X	X	8

Sheet B	1	2	3	4	5	6	7	8	9	10	Final
Jean-Michel Ménard	1	0	1	1	2	0	0	1	0	0	6
Robert Desjardins	0	2	0	0	0	0	1	0	2	2	7

Sheet C	1	2	3	4	5	6	7	8	9	10	Final
Martin Ferland	3	0	0	1	0	0	0	0	0	0	4
François Gagné	0	1	0	0	0	0	0	0	1	1	3

Sheet D	1	2	3	4	5	6	7	8	9	10	Final
Denis Robichaud	0	0	1	0	0	0	X	X	X	X	1
Mike Fournier	0	2	0	1	1	3	X	X	X	X	7

=== Draw 6 ===
Tuesday, January 14, 19:30

Sheet A	1	2	3	4	5	6	7	8	9	10	Final
Mike Fournier	0	1	3	0	0	2	0	2	0	X	8
François Gagné	0	0	0	3	1	0	1	0	0	X	5

Sheet B	1	2	3	4	5	6	7	8	9	10	Final
Steeve Gagnon	1	0	3	1	0	1	1	0	1	X	8
Martin Ferland	0	1	0	0	2	0	0	1	0	X	4

Sheet C	1	2	3	4	5	6	7	8	9	10	Final
Serge Reid	0	0	1	0	1	0	0	1	0	X	3
Jean-Michel Ménard	2	0	0	1	0	1	1	0	3	X	8

Sheet D	1	2	3	4	5	6	7	8	9	10	Final
Philippe Lemay	0	2	0	1	0	1	1	0	2	1	8
Robert Desjardins	1	0	2	0	1	0	0	1	0	0	5

=== Draw 7 ===
Wednesday, January 15, 12:00

Sheet A	1	2	3	4	5	6	7	8	9	10	Final
Jean-Michel Ménard	2	0	1	0	0	1	1	0	3	X	8
Steeve Gagnon	0	0	0	1	0	0	0	2	0	X	3

Sheet B	1	2	3	4	5	6	7	8	9	10	Final
Denis Robichaud	1	1	0	1	0	0	0	2	0	1	6
Philippe Lemay	0	0	2	0	2	1	1	0	2	0	8

Sheet C	1	2	3	4	5	6	7	8	9	10	Final
Alexandre Ferland	1	0	0	0	1	0	X	X	X	X	2
Mike Fournier	0	1	3	2	0	2	X	X	X	X	8

Sheet D	1	2	3	4	5	6	7	8	9	10	Final
Martin Ferland	1	0	1	1	0	1	0	1	0	2	7
Serge Reid	0	1	0	0	1	0	1	0	1	0	4

=== Draw 8 ===
Wednesday, January 15, 19:30

Sheet A	1	2	3	4	5	6	7	8	9	10	Final
Philippe Lemay	0	0	1	0	0	1	0	X	X	X	2
Martin Ferland	2	1	0	3	0	0	4	X	X	X	10

Sheet B	1	2	3	4	5	6	7	8	9	10	Final
Mike Fournier	0	1	0	2	1	0	0	1	0	1	6
Jean-Michel Ménard	0	0	2	0	0	4	0	0	2	0	8

Sheet C	1	2	3	4	5	6	7	8	9	10	Final
François Gagné	1	0	0	2	1	0	2	0	2	X	8
Serge Reid	0	0	1	0	0	2	0	1	0	X	4

Sheet D	1	2	3	4	5	6	7	8	9	10	Final
Robert Desjardins	0	2	0	0	2	0	1	0	2	0	7
Steeve Gagnon	2	0	1	1	0	1	0	3	0	1	9

=== Draw 9 ===
Thursday, January 16, 12:00

Sheet A	1	2	3	4	5	6	7	8	9	10	Final
Serge Reid	1	1	1	1	1	1	0	1	0	0	7
Mike Fournier	0	0	0	0	0	0	4	0	1	1	6

Sheet B	1	2	3	4	5	6	7	8	9	10	Final
Robert Desjardins	5	0	0	4	2	X	X	X	X	X	11
Alexandre Ferland	0	1	2	0	0	X	X	X	X	X	3

Sheet C	1	2	3	4	5	6	7	8	9	10	Final
Steeve Gagnon	0	2	0	2	0	0	1	0	2	0	7
Philippe Lemay	1	0	2	0	2	1	0	1	0	1	8

Sheet D	1	2	3	4	5	6	7	8	9	10	Final
François Gagné	0	0	2	0	0	0	0	5	X	X	7
Denis Robichaud	0	0	0	0	1	0	1	0	X	X	2

=== Draw 10 ===
Thursday, January 16, 19:30

Sheet B	1	2	3	4	5	6	7	8	9	10	Final
Philippe Lemay	0	0	1	0	0	2	0	0	0	0	3
Mike Fournier	0	1	0	0	1	0	0	2	0	2	6

Sheet C	1	2	3	4	5	6	7	8	9	10	Final
Jean-Michel Ménard	0	0	4	0	2	0	0	1	0	1	8
Martin Ferland	0	1	0	1	0	0	1	0	2	0	5

=== Draw 11 ===
Friday, January 17, 8:15

Sheet B	1	2	3	4	5	6	7	8	9	10	Final
Alexandre Ferland	0	1	0	0	0	1	X	X	X	X	2
François Gagné	2	0	1	1	4	0	X	X	X	X	8

Sheet C	1	2	3	4	5	6	7	8	9	10	Final
Denis Robichaud	0	2	0	2	3	1	0	X	X	X	8
Robert Desjardins	0	0	1	0	0	0	1	X	X	X	2

=== Draw 12 ===
Friday, January 17, 12:00

Sheet A	1	2	3	4	5	6	7	8	9	10	Final
Philippe Lemay	0	2	0	0	2	0	2	0	X	X	6
Jean-Michel Ménard	0	0	0	0	0	1	0	0	X	X	1

Sheet B	1	2	3	4	5	6	7	8	9	10	Final
Serge Reid	0	0	1	0	1	0	X	X	X	X	2
Steeve Gagnon	1	2	0	3	0	2	X	X	X	X	8

Sheet D	1	2	3	4	5	6	7	8	9	10	Final
Mike Fournier	0	4	3	0	0	X	X	X	X	X	7
Martin Ferland	0	0	0	1	0	X	X	X	X	X	1

=== Draw 13 ===
Friday, January 17, 15:45

Sheet A	1	2	3	4	5	6	7	8	9	10	Final
Robert Desjardins	0	0	1	0	0	X	X	X	X	X	1
François Gagné	1	1	0	4	1	X	X	X	X	X	7

Sheet D	1	2	3	4	5	6	7	8	9	10	Final
Denis Robichaud	0	0	1	1	1	0	1	0	3	0	7
Alexandre Ferland	2	0	0	0	0	1	0	1	0	1	5

== Tiebreaker ==
Friday, January 17, 19:30

Sheet A	1	2	3	4	5	6	7	8	9	10	11	Final
Martin Ferland	0	0	2	0	1	2	0	0	1	0	1	7
Steeve Gagnon	0	1	0	2	0	0	1	1	0	1	0	6

== Playoffs ==
Page playoff system
1	Philippe Lemay	10
2	Jean-Michel Ménard	6
3	Mike Fournier	6
4	Martin Ferland	5

Semifinal
2	Jean-Michel Ménard	7
3	Mike Fournier	6

Final
1	Philippe Lemay	4
2	Jean-Michel Ménard	7

=== 1 vs. 2 ===
Saturday, January 18, 18:30

Sheet B	1	2	3	4	5	6	7	8	9	10	Final
Philippe Lemay	2	0	3	0	2	0	2	0	1	X	10
Jean-Michel Ménard	0	2	0	2	0	0	0	2	0	X	6

=== 3 vs. 4 ===
Saturday, January 18, 18:30

Sheet C	1	2	3	4	5	6	7	8	9	10	Final
Mike Fournier	1	1	0	1	0	0	1	0	0	2	6
Martin Ferland	0	0	3	0	1	0	0	0	1	0	5

=== Semifinal ===
Sunday, January 19, 8:30

Sheet C	1	2	3	4	5	6	7	8	9	10	Final
Jean-Michel Ménard	0	1	0	1	1	0	0	1	0	3	7
Mike Fournier	2	0	1	0	0	2	0	0	1	0	6

=== Final ===
Sunday, January 19, 13:00

Sheet C	1	2	3	4	5	6	7	8	9	10	Final
Philippe Lemay	1	0	1	0	0	1	0	0	1	X	4
Jean-Michel Ménard	0	4	0	0	1	0	2	0	0	X	7

2014 Quebec Men's Provincial Curling Championship

Jean-Michel Ménard
8th Quebec Provincial Championship title
