= Michael Fournier =

Canadian curler (born 1971)

- Curler
- Born: November 24, 1971 (age 54); Lachine, Quebec

Team
- Curling club: Leaside CC, East York, Toronto
- Skip: Michael Fournier
- Third: Charlie Richard
- Second: Punit Sthankiya
- Lead: Graeme Robson

Curling career
- Member Association: Quebec (1996–2022); Ontario (2022–present)
- Brier: 3 (2018, 2021, 2022)
- Top CTRS ranking: 16th (2021–22)

Michael "Mike" Fournier (born November 24, 1971) is a Canadian curler originally from Sainte-Anne-de-Bellevue, Quebec. He currently skips his own team out of Toronto, Ontario.

== Career ==
Fournier played in his first Quebec Tankard in 2014 at the 2014 Quebec Men's Provincial Curling Championship. His team reached the semifinal where they lost to eventual champions Jean-Michel Ménard. They made it one game further the following year at the 2015 Quebec Men's Provincial Curling Championship, losing in the final to the Ménard rink. Fournier won his first provincial championship at the 2018 WFG Tankard. His team qualified for the playoffs as the fourth seed and won three straight games to claim the provincial title. At the 2018 Tim Hortons Brier, Fournier led his team to a 3–5 record, finishing in tenth place. They could not defend their provincial title the following year, losing to Martin Crête in the final of the 2019 WFG Tankard.

Fournier and his team of Félix Asselin, William Dion and Jean-François Trépanier qualified for their first Grand Slam of Curling event during the 2019–20 season at the 2019 Tour Challenge Tier 2. The team qualified for the playoffs with a perfect 4–0 record. They then defeated Jamie Murphy in the quarterfinals before losing to eventual winners Korey Dropkin in the semifinal. Also during the 2019–20 season, they finished third at the 2020 Quebec Tankard.

Due to the COVID-19 pandemic in Quebec, the 2021 provincial championship was cancelled. Curling Québec then decided to appoint Team Fournier to represent Quebec at the 2021 Tim Hortons Brier in Calgary, Alberta. The event was played in a bio-secure bubble to prevent the spread of the virus. At the 2021 Brier, Fournier led Quebec to a 4–4 record, failing to qualify for the championship round.

In their first event of the 2021–22 season, Team Fournier reached the final of the Capital Curling Fall Open. Because of their previous successes on tour, the team had enough points to qualify for the 2021 Canadian Olympic Curling Pre-Trials. At the Pre-Trials, the team finished the round robin with a 3–3 record, missing the playoff round. Later in the season, they won the Challenge Casino de Charlevoix and reached the final of both the Stu Sells 1824 Halifax Classic and the Finale du Circuit. The Quebec Tankard was once again cancelled due to the pandemic and Team Fournier were named as the provinces representatives for the 2022 Tim Hortons Brier. At the Brier, the team finished once again with a 4–4, placing sixth in their pool. Following the season, Fournier moved to Ontario and formed a new team consisting of Kevin Flewwelling, Sean Harrison and Zander Elmes.

Aside from men's curling, Fournier has represented Quebec at three Canadian Mixed Curling Championships in 1997, 2013 and 2014. His best result was in 2013, where he skipped the Quebec team to a bronze medal finish.

== Personal life ==
Fournier is employed as a pricing strategy manager at McDonald's Canada. He is married to Anne Morinville and has three kids.

Fournier moved to Toronto (East York) in 2022.

== Teams ==
Season	Skip	Third	Second	Lead
1996–97	Guy Hemmings	Mike Fournier	Guy Thibaudeau	Dale Ness
1998–99	Mike Fournier	Chris Le Couffe	Duncan Robertson	Greg Barlow
2003–04	Mike Fournier	Mark McClory	Andrew MacKay	Christian Bouchard
2004–05	Mike Fournier	Mark McClory	Steven Munroe	Mike Kennedy
2005–06	Scott Hill	Mike Fournier	Daryl Ness	Luc Chevalier
2007–08	Dwayne Fowler	Mike Fournier	Brad Fitzherbert	Mike Kennedy
2008–09	Mike Fournier	Sébastien Robillard	Brad Fitzherbert	Mike Kennedy
2009–10	Mike Fournier	Martin Roy	Derek Lockwood	Mike Kennedy
2010–11	Mike Fournier	Tom Wharry	Derek Lockwood	Mike Kennedy
2011–12	Mike Fournier	Dwayne Fowler	Simon Lejour	Yannick Lejour
2012–13	Mike Fournier	François Gionset	Yannick Martel	Jean-François Charset
2013–14	Mike Fournier	François Gionset	Yannick Martel	Jean-François Charset
2014–15	Mike Fournier	François Gionset	Yannick Martel	Jean-François Charset
2015–16	Mike Fournier	François Gionset	Yannick Martel	Jean-François Charset
2016–17	Mike Fournier	Félix Asselin	William Dion	Miguel Bernard
2017–18	Mike Fournier	Félix Asselin	William Dion	Jean-François Trépanier
2018–19	Mike Fournier	Félix Asselin	William Dion	Jean-François Trépanier
2019–20	Mike Fournier	Félix Asselin	William Dion	Jean-François Trépanier
2020–21	Mike Fournier	Martin Crête	Félix Asselin	Jean-François Trépanier
2021–22	Félix Asselin (Fourth)	Martin Crête	Mike Fournier (Skip)	Jean-François Trépanier
2022–23	Mike Fournier	Kevin Flewwelling	Sean Harrison	Zander Elmes
2023–24	Mike Fournier	Kevin Flewwelling	Sean Harrison	Zander Elmes
2024–25	Mike Fournier	Charlie Richard	Émile Asselin	Punit Sthankiya
2025–26	Mike Fournier	Charlie Richard	Punit Sthankiya	Graeme Robson
2026–27	Mike Fournier	Charlie Richard	Punit Sthankiya	Graeme Robson
