= Félix Asselin =

Canadian curler

- Curler
- Born: November 17, 1994 (age 32); Sainte-Agathe-des-Monts, Quebec

Team
- Curling club: Glenmore CC, Dollard-des-Ormeaux, QC
- Skip: Félix Asselin
- Third: Julien Tremblay
- Second: Jesse Mullen
- Lead: Jean-Michel Arsenault

Curling career
- Member Association: Quebec
- Brier: 6 (2018, 2021, 2022, 2023, 2025, 2026)
- World Mixed Championship: 1 (2023)
- Top CTRS ranking: 14th (2022–23)
Medal record
Curling
Representing Canada
World Mixed Championship
Bronze medal – third place	2023 Aberdeen

Félix Asselin (born November 17, 1994) is a Canadian curler from Montreal. He currently skips his own team.

== Career ==
=== Juniors ===
Asselin skipped Quebec at four Canadian Junior Curling Championships during his junior career in 2012, 2013, 2015 and 2016. In 2012, he led his team to a 7–5 seventh-place finish and in 2013 he finished in eighth with a 3–7 record. His best result came in 2015, where he qualified for the championship pool with a 6–0 record. He then went 1–3 in the championship pool, qualifying for the tiebreaker. He defeated Alberta in the tiebreaker before losing to Saskatchewan in the second, ultimately being eliminated. His final appearance in 2016 was a 6–4 fifth-place finish.

=== Men's ===
Out of juniors, Asselin joined the Mike Fournier rink at third with William Dion at second and Miguel Bernard at lead. On the World Curling Tour, the team won the Capital Curling Fall Open Men, finished runner-up at the Capital Curling Classic and made the semifinals at the Dave Jones Mayflower Cashspiel. At the 2017 WFG Tankard, they lost out in a tiebreaker. Also during the 2016–17 season, Asselin competed at the 2017 Canadian Mixed Doubles Curling Championship with partner Jill Routledge. Representing Quebec, they finished with a 1–6 record. The following season, Team Fournier won the 2018 WFG Tankard. The team qualified for the playoffs as the fourth seed and won three straight games to claim the provincial title. At the 2018 Tim Hortons Brier, they finished 3–5 record, finishing in tenth place. They could not defend their provincial title the following year, losing to Martin Crête in the final of the 2019 WFG Tankard.

Asselin qualified for his first Grand Slam of Curling event during the 2019–20 season at the 2019 Tour Challenge Tier 2. His team qualified for the playoffs with a perfect 4–0 record. They then defeated Jamie Murphy in the quarterfinals before losing to eventual winners Korey Dropkin in the semifinal. Also during the 2019–20 season, Team Fournier finished third at the 2020 Quebec Tankard.

Due to the COVID-19 pandemic in Quebec, the 2021 provincial championship was cancelled. Curling Québec then decided to appoint Team Fournier to represent Quebec at the 2021 Tim Hortons Brier in Calgary, Alberta. The event was played in a bio-secure bubble to prevent the spread of the virus. At the Brier, they finished with a 4–4 record, failing to qualify for the championship round.

In their first event of the 2021–22 season, Team Fournier reached the final of the Capital Curling Fall Open. Because of their previous successes on tour, the team had enough points to qualify for the 2021 Canadian Olympic Curling Pre-Trials. At the Pre-Trials, the team finished the round robin with a 3–3 record, missing the playoff round. Later in the season, they won the Challenge Casino de Charlevoix and reached the final of both the Stu Sells 1824 Halifax Classic and the Finale du Circuit. The Quebec Tankard was once again cancelled due to the pandemic and Team Fournier were named as the province's representatives for the 2022 Tim Hortons Brier. At the Brier, the team finished once again with a 4–4, placing sixth in their pool. Following the season, skip Mike Fournier moved to Ontario and Asselin took over as skip of the team with brother Émile Asselin coming in to play second.

In 2024, it was announced that Émile would be stepping back from curling and Team Asselin would welcome Brier champion Jean-Michel Ménard as the third, joining Félix, Martin Crête, and Jean-François Trépanier. Ménard, halfway through the season would begin skipping the team, with Asselin continuing to throw fourth stones. Team Ménard would win the 2025 Quebec Tankard, qualifying them to represent Quebec at the 2025 Montana's Brier. At the Brier, the team finished 4–4, missing out on the playoffs.

Team Ménard would start the 2025–26 curling season at the 2025 Canadian Olympic Curling Pre-Trials, where they would finish with a 4–3 record, narrowly missing out on the playoffs. Ménard would again win the 2026 Quebec Tankard and represent Quebec at the 2026 Montana's Brier. Prior to the Brier, all 3 teammates of Asselin (Ménard, Crête, and Trépanier) announced they would be retiring at the end of the season. At their final Brier, Team Ménard finished 5–3, missing out on the playoffs due to the last-stone-draw tiebreaker. Asselin would announce he would be returning to skip a new team for the following season, alongside Julien Tremblay, Jesse Mullen, and Jean-Michel Arsenault.

=== Mixed doubles ===
Asselin represented Quebec at the 2021 Canadian Mixed Doubles Curling Championship with Laurie St-Georges. At the championship, the pair just missed the playoffs, finishing in fifteenth place with a 4–2 record.

=== Mixed ===
Asselin skipped team Quebec at the 2019 Canadian Mixed Curling Championship, with his team consisting of Laurie St-Georges, Émile Asselin and Emily Riley. The team finished on top of the standings after the championship pool with an 8–2 record before losing in the semifinal to Nova Scotia. They bounced back in the bronze medal game, defeating Ontario for the bronze medal.

Asselin and St-Georges, brother Émile and lead Emily Riley would return to represent Quebec and win the 2022 Canadian Mixed Curling Championship. They went on to win the bronze medal at the world mixed curling championships in Aberdeen, Scotland, narrowly defeating Norway 4–3.

== Personal life ==
Asselin is employed as a geologist at Wesdome Gold Mines. His father Benoit Forget is the coach of his team and his brother Émile Asselin is also a curler. He is in a relationship with fellow curler Laurie St-Georges.

== Grand Slam record ==
Key
C	Champion
F	Lost in Final
SF	Lost in Semifinal
QF	Lost in Quarterfinals
R16	Lost in the round of 16
Q	Did not advance to playoffs
T2	Played in Tier 2 event
DNP	Did not participate in event
N/A	Not a Grand Slam event that season

Event	2019–20	2020–21	2021–22	2022–23	2023–24	2024–25	2025–26	2026–27
Invitational	T2	N/A	N/A	T2	DNP	DNP	DNP	DNP
Open	DNP	N/A	N/A	DNP	DNP	DNP	DNP	

== Teams ==
Season	Skip	Third	Second	Lead
2011–12	Félix Asselin	Marc-Alexandre Charest-Dion	Lewis South	Sami Guimond-Jaber
2012–13	Félix Asselin	Marc-Alexandre Charest-Dion	Lewis South	Sami Guimond-Jaber
2013–14	Félix Asselin	Alex Cormier	Lewis South	Émile Asselin
2014–15	Félix Asselin	Alex Cormier	Lewis South	Émile Asselin
2015–16	William Dion	Félix Asselin	Miguel Bernard	Jason Olsthoorn
2016–17	Mike Fournier	Félix Asselin	William Dion	Miguel Bernard
2017–18	Mike Fournier	Félix Asselin	William Dion	Jean-François Trépanier
2018–19	Mike Fournier	Félix Asselin	William Dion	Jean-François Trépanier
2019–20	Mike Fournier	Félix Asselin	William Dion	Jean-François Trépanier
2020–21	Mike Fournier	Martin Crête	Félix Asselin	Jean-François Trépanier
2021–22	Félix Asselin (Fourth)	Martin Crête	Mike Fournier (Skip)	Jean-François Trépanier
2022–23	Félix Asselin	Martin Crête	Émile Asselin	Jean-François Trépanier
2023–24	Félix Asselin	Martin Crête	Émile Asselin	Jean-François Trépanier
2024–25	Félix Asselin (Fourth)	Jean-Michel Ménard (Skip)	Martin Crête	Jean-François Trépanier
2025–26	Félix Asselin (Fourth)	Jean-Michel Ménard (Skip)	Martin Crête	Jean-François Trépanier
2026–27	Félix Asselin	Julien Tremblay	Jesse Mullen	Jean-Michel Arsenault
