= William Dion =

Canadian curler and football player (born 1987)

- Curler
- Born: December 18, 1987 (age 38); Drummondville, Quebec

Team
- Curling club: CS Celanese, Drummondville, QC & Glenmore CC, Dollard-des-Ormeaux, QC
- Skip: Mike Fournier
- Third: Martin Crête
- Second: Félix Asselin
- Lead: Jean-François Trépanier
- Alternate: William Dion

Curling career
- Member Association: Quebec
- Brier: 2 (2018, 2021)
- Top CTRS ranking: 19th (2019–20)
Medal record
Men's curling
Representing Canada
World Junior Championships
Bronze medal – third place	2008 Östersund

William Dion
Profile
- Position: Kicker

Personal information
- Listed height: 5 ft 11 in (1.80 m)
- Listed weight: 210 lb (95 kg)

Career information
- University: Sherbrooke

Career history
- 2013: Montreal Alouettes*
- * Offseason or practice squad member only

William Dion (born December 18, 1987) is a Canadian curler and football player. He is a two-sport athlete and has found success both on the ice, having been the winning skip at the 2008 Canadian Junior Curling Championships, and on the field, being signed by the Montreal Alouettes of the Canadian Football League.

== Curling career ==
He won his first Quebec junior curling championship in 2007, playing third for Ghyslain Richard. The rink finished the round robin at the 2007 Canadian Junior Curling Championships with a 9-3 record, but the lost in the semi-final to Prince Edward Island. The following year, he won the Quebec junior title as a skip. At the 2008 Canadian Junior Curling Championships, his Quebec team went 10-2 in the round robin, and beat Ontario's Travis Fanset in the final. Dion and his team of Jean-Michel Arsenault, Erik Lachance and Miguel Bernard would go on to represent Canada at the 2008 World Junior Curling Championships. At the World Juniors, they finished the round robin in first place with a 7-2 record, but lost 2 playoff games and had to settle for a bronze medal.

After his junior career, Dion would go on to play on the Quebec team at the 2010 Canadian Mixed Curling Championship. Dion played second on the team, which was skipped by Simon Hébert. The team finished the round robin with a 4-7 record.

In January 2013, the same month as getting signed to play football for the Alouettes, Dion played in his first Quebec Men's Provincial Curling Championship where he skipped a team to a 2-7 record.

Dion later joined Mike Fournier's curling rink for the 2016–17 season as a second. In February 2018, the team was victorious at the 2018 WFG Tankard, advancing to the 2018 Tim Hortons Brier as Team Québec where they finished with a 3–5 record. They could not defend their provincial title the following year, losing to Martin Crête in the final of the 2019 WFG Tankard.

Dion qualified for his first Grand Slam of Curling event during the 2019–20 season at the 2019 Tour Challenge Tier 2. His team qualified for the playoffs with a perfect 4–0 record. They then defeated Jamie Murphy in the quarterfinals before losing to eventual winners Korey Dropkin in the semifinal. Also during the 2019–20 season, Team Fournier finished third at the 2020 Quebec Tankard.

Due to the COVID-19 pandemic in Quebec, the 2021 provincial championship was cancelled. Curling Québec then decided to appoint Team Fournier to represent Quebec at the 2021 Tim Hortons Brier in Calgary, Alberta. The event was played in a bio-secure bubble to prevent the spread of the virus. At the Brier, they finished with a 4–4 record, failing to qualify for the championship round.

== Football career ==
In football, Dion played five seasons as a kicker with the Sherbrooke Vert et Or University football team. On October 6, 2012 he set a Canadian Interuniversity Sport record when kicked his 72nd career field goal, surpassing Aaron Ifield's previous record. Dion was signed by the Alouettes on January 9, 2013. He was released by the Alouettes on May 30, 2013.

== Personal life ==
Dion works as a history teacher at École secondaire Jeanne-Mance. He is in a relationship with Marika Dionne and has a daughter and a step daughter.
