= Travis Fanset =

Canadian curler

- Curler
- Born: July 26, 1991 (age 35); St. Thomas, Ontario

Team
- Curling club: Tillsonburg & District CC, Tillsomburg, ON
- Skip: Pat Ferris
- Third: Travis Fanset
- Second: Rob Ainsley
- Lead: Scott Clinton

Curling career
- Member Association: Ontario

Travis Mitchell Fanset (born July 26, 1991) is a Canadian curler from Tillsonburg, Ontario. A former Canadian junior runner-up, he currently plays third on Team Pat Ferris.

== Career ==
Fanset and his rink of Craig Van Ymeren, Geoff Chambers and Christopher Jay won the 2008 Ontario Junior Curling Championships, defeating Neil Sinclair in the provincial final. The team represented Ontario at the 2008 Canadian Junior Curling Championships. There, Fanset led his rink to a 9–3 round robin record. The team then defeated Saskatchewan (skipped by Brennen Jones) in a tiebreaker, and then Prince Edward Island (Brett Gallant) in the semifinal, before losing to Quebec's William Dion in the final.

In 2012, Fanset joined the Mark Kean rink, playing third on the team, which also included Patrick Janssen and Tim March. The team found early success on the World Curling Tour, winning the 2012 KW Fall Classic, Fanset's first career Tour title. Over the course of the 2012–13 curling season, the rink played in all four Grand Slam events. At the 2012 Masters, they were win less, going 0–5. However, in their second Grand Slam of the season, the 2012 Canadian Open, not only did they win a game, they went all the way to the semi-final where they lost to provincial rival Glenn Howard. The team then went 1–4 at the 2013 National, and were again win less at the 2013 Players' Championship.

The next season, the Kean rink played in the 2013 Canadian Olympic Curling Pre-Trials, where they were eliminated after losing all three of their games. The team found success again at the 2013 Canadian Open, where they lost in the quarter-finals. Kean left the team mid-season, with Fanset taking over the reins as skip for The National Slam event. Chad Allen joined the team at third. The team went win less, losing all five games. After the event, the team picked up John Epping to skip the rink, with Fanset moving back to third. The team found immediate success, making it to the quarter-finals of the season ending 2014 Players' Championship. Following the season, the team decided to remain together with Epping as skip.

Early on in the 2014–15 curling season, the Epping rink won the Gord Carroll Curling Classic Tour event. In that season's slams, the team made it to the semifinals of the 2014 Masters, but missed the playoffs at The National, the Canadian Open and the 2015 Elite 10. The team made it to the 2015 Ontario Tankard, the provincial men's championship, Fanset's first. The team made it to the provincial final, where they lost to a newly formed Mark Kean rink. Fanset was replaced by Mat Camm on the team before the season ending Players' Championship.

After starting the 2015–16 curling season skipping a team that included Wayne Tuck Jr., Josh Barry and Chad Allen, Fanset joined the Scott Bailey rink by October as the team's lead. The team played in the 2016 Ontario Tankard, where Fanset had to take over the reins as skip, with Bailey having to miss the event to attend a corporate gathering. Fanset led the team of Joe Frans, Craig Van Ymeren and spare Fraser Reid to a 5–5 record.

Fanset won his third career World Curling Tour event at the 2016 Stroud Sleeman Cash Spiel, playing third for Chad Allen. Fanset remained on the Bailey rink for the rest of the season though (with Fanset at third), and the team played in the 2017 Ontario Tankard. There, they made the playoffs where they lost the 3 vs. 4 game.

After a long hiatus from competitive curling, Fanset returned for the 2022-23 curling season, skipping a team of Aaron Squires, Van Ymeren and Scott Brandon. The team qualified for the 2023 Ontario Tankard.

Outside of regular men's curling, Fanset played in the 2014 Canadian Mixed Doubles Curling Trials with partner Rachelle Vink. The pair went 5–2 in the round robin, but were eliminated in the round of 12.

== Personal life ==
He works as an ice technician at the Ingersoll and Tillsonburg Curling Clubs. He attended Parkside Collegiate Institute. His father, Dale had also been an ice technician at the Tillsonburg Club.
