= 2018 WFG Tankard =

- Host city: Dollard-des-Ormeaux, Quebec
- Arena: Glenmore Curling Club
- Dates: February 4–11, 2018
- Winner: Team Fournier
- Curling club: Glenmore Curling Club, Dollard-des-Ormeaux; Club de curling Valleyfield, Salaberry-de-Valleyfield
- Skip: Mike Fournier
- Third: Félix Asselin
- Second: William Dion
- Lead: Jean-François Trépanier
- Finalist: Jean-Michel Ménard

The 2018 WFG Tankard, the Quebec men's provincial curling championship was held from February 4 to 11 at the Glenmore Curling Club in Dollard-des-Ormeaux, Quebec. The winning Mike Fournier team represented Quebec at the 2018 Tim Hortons Brier in Regina, Saskatchewan.

== Teams ==
Teams are as follows

Skip	Third	Second	Lead	Alternate	Club(s)
Vincent Bourget	Jasmin Gibeau	Dan deWaard	Louis Biron		Thurso/Buckingham/Trois-Rivières
Robert Desjardins	Jean-Sébastien Roy	Pierre-Luc Morissette	René Dubois	Thierry Fournier	Chicoutimi/Kenogami/Victoria
Simon Dupuis	Martin Roy	Philippe Brassard	Olivier Beaulieu		Brownsburg/Glenmore/Portneuf/Rosemère
François Roberge	Martin Ferland (skip)	Maxime Elmaleh	Jean Gagnon		Laviolette/Etchemin
Mike Fournier	Félix Asselin	William Dion	Jean-François Trépanier	Emile Asselin	Glenmore/Valleyfield
François Gagné	Jean-Michel Arsenault	Erik Lachance	Christian Bouchard		TMR/Etchemin/Mont-Bruno
Mark Homan	Fred Lawton	Colton Daly	Gary Findley		Baie d'Urfé
Marcel Marchand	Normand Bornais	Gregory Bornais	Daniel Massé		Trois-Rivières/Grand-Mère
Yannick Martel	François Gionest	Jean-François Charest	Alexandre Ferland		Kénogami/Riverbend
Jean-Michel Ménard	Martin Crête	Eric Sylvain	Philippe Ménard		Etchemin
Vincent Roberge	Jesse Mullen	Julien Tremblay	Fabien Roberge		Etchemin
Jeffrey Stewart	Simon Hébert	Lewis South	Ian South	Scott Hill	Glenmore/Valleyfield
Pier-Luc Trépanier	Marco Fortier	François Hallé	Alexandre Leduc	Alexandre Binette	Valleyfield
Matt Kennerknecht	Ben Vezeau (skip)	Cameron Maclean	Jonathan Spring		Glenmore

== Round robin standings ==
Final Round Robin Standings

Key
Teams to Championship Round
Teams to Tiebreaker

Pool A	W	L
Fournier	6	0
Ménard	5	1
Stewart	3	3
Dupuis	3	3
Gagné	3	3
Vezeau	1	5
Trépanier	0	6

Pool B	W	L
Ferland	6	0
Roberge	4	2
Desjardins	3	3
Martel	3	3
Homan	3	3
Bourget	1	5
Marchand	1	5

== Round Robin Results ==
Scores

=== Draw 1 ===
Sunday, February 4, 16:30

Sheet A	1	2	3	4	5	6	7	8	9	10	Final
Jean-Michel Ménard	0	0	1	1	2	0	1	0	3	X	8
Pier-Luc Trépanier	0	0	0	0	0	0	0	2	0	X	2

Sheet B	1	2	3	4	5	6	7	8	9	10	Final
François Gagné	0	1	1	0	1	0	0	3	3	X	9
Simon Dupuis	0	0	0	1	0	0	1	0	0	X	2

Sheet C	1	2	3	4	5	6	7	8	9	10	Final
Jeffrey Stewart	0	1	0	1	0	0	2	0	X	X	4
Mike Fournier	1	0	4	0	1	1	0	2	X	X	9

=== Draw 2 ===
Sunday, February 4, 20:30

Sheet A	1	2	3	4	5	6	7	8	9	10	Final
Robert Desjardins	3	0	0	2	0	1	0	3	1	X	10
Vincent Bourget	0	2	0	0	0	0	3	0	0	X	5

Sheet B	1	2	3	4	5	6	7	8	9	10	Final
Yannick Martel	2	1	0	0	0	1	0	3	1	X	8
Mark Homan	0	0	0	2	2	0	1	0	0	X	5

Sheet C	1	2	3	4	5	6	7	8	9	10	Final
Martin Ferland	3	0	2	1	1	0	X	X	X	X	7
Marcel Marchand	0	1	0	0	0	1	X	X	X	X	2

=== Draw 3 ===
Monday, February 5, 10:00

Sheet A	1	2	3	4	5	6	7	8	9	10	Final
Jeffrey Stewart	1	0	2	0	2	0	0	0	0	1	6
Simon Dupuis	0	1	0	1	0	2	1	0	3	0	8

Sheet B	1	2	3	4	5	6	7	8	9	10	Final
Ben Vézeau	0	0	0	1	0	2	0	0	0	X	3
Jean-Michel Ménard	2	0	0	0	2	0	2	0	1	X	7

Sheet C	1	2	3	4	5	6	7	8	9	10	Final
Vincent Roberge	0	2	0	0	1	1	0	0	1	1	6
Martin Ferland	2	0	3	0	0	0	3	0	0	0	8

Sheet D	1	2	3	4	5	6	7	8	9	10	Final
Pier-Luc Trépanier	0	1	2	0	1	1	0	0	1	0	6
Mike Fournier	2	0	0	2	0	0	2	3	0	1	10

=== Draw 4 ===
Monday, February 5, 14:30

Sheet A	1	2	3	4	5	6	7	8	9	10	Final
Vincent Roberge	2	0	5	0	0	2	0	0	0	1	10
Robert Desjardins	0	1	0	0	1	0	2	1	1	0	6

Sheet B	1	2	3	4	5	6	7	8	9	10	Final
Marcel Marchand	0	1	0	2	0	1	0	0	0	X	3
Yannick Martel	1	0	3	0	1	0	3	0	1	X	9

Sheet C	1	2	3	4	5	6	7	8	9	10	Final
Ben Vézeau	0	1	0	1	0	2	0	1	1	0	6
François Gagné	3	0	1	0	1	0	0	0	0	2	7

Sheet D	1	2	3	4	5	6	7	8	9	10	Final
Vincent Bourget	0	2	0	1	0	1	0	0	X	X	4
Mark Homan	1	0	2	0	3	0	3	1	X	X	10

=== Draw 5 ===
Monday, February 5, 19:00

Sheet A	1	2	3	4	5	6	7	8	9	10	Final
Vincent Bourget	0	0	0	0	0	1	0	X	X	X	1
Martin Ferland	2	0	0	1	1	0	2	X	X	X	6

Sheet B	1	2	3	4	5	6	7	8	9	10	Final
Jeffrey Stewart	1	0	2	0	1	1	0	2	3	X	10
Pier-Luc Trépanier	0	2	0	1	0	0	1	0	0	X	4

Sheet C	1	2	3	4	5	6	7	8	9	10	Final
Mark Homan	1	0	0	3	0	0	2	0	1	X	7
Marcel Marchand	0	0	1	0	0	1	0	2	0	X	4

Sheet D	1	2	3	4	5	6	7	8	9	10	Final
Simon Dupuis	0	0	0	1	1	0	0	X	X	X	2
Jean-Michel Ménard	1	1	2	0	0	2	2	X	X	X	8

=== Draw 6 ===
Tuesday, February 6, 10:00

Sheet A	1	2	3	4	5	6	7	8	9	10	Final
Marcel Marchand	2	0	0	1	0	3	0	3	1	X	10
Vincent Roberge	0	1	1	0	1	0	1	0	0	X	4

Sheet B	1	2	3	4	5	6	7	8	9	10	Final
Mark Homan	1	0	1	1	0	0	1	0	X	X	4
Martin Ferland	0	3	0	0	0	4	0	2	X	X	9

Sheet C	1	2	3	4	5	6	7	8	9	10	11	Final
Robert Desjardins	0	0	1	0	2	0	3	0	2	0	1	9
Yannick Martel	0	1	0	1	0	2	0	2	0	2	0	8

Sheet D	1	2	3	4	5	6	7	8	9	10	Final
Ben Vézeau	1	1	0	0	2	2	0	0	1	0	7
Pier-Luc Trépanier	0	0	1	1	0	0	2	1	0	1	6

=== Draw 7 ===
Tuesday, February 6, 14:30

Sheet A	1	2	3	4	5	6	7	8	9	10	Final
Mike Fournier	0	2	0	1	0	2	1	0	3	X	9
François Gagné	2	0	2	0	1	0	0	2	0	X	7

Sheet B	1	2	3	4	5	6	7	8	9	10	Final
Yannick Martel	0	0	0	0	0	1	0	0	X	X	1
Vincent Roberge	0	0	1	1	1	0	0	3	X	X	6

Sheet C	1	2	3	4	5	6	7	8	9	10	Final
Marcel Marchand	0	3	0	0	0	2	0	0	2	X	7
Vincent Bourget	1	0	2	2	1	0	2	1	0	X	9

Sheet D	1	2	3	4	5	6	7	8	9	10	Final
Jean-Michel Ménard	1	0	0	3	0	1	0	0	1	X	6
Jeffrey Stewart	0	1	1	0	1	0	0	0	0	X	3

=== Draw 8 ===
Tuesday, February 6, 19:00

Sheet A	1	2	3	4	5	6	7	8	9	10	Final
Pier-Luc Trépanier	0	0	1	0	X	X	X	X	X	X	1
Simon Dupuis	2	1	0	5	X	X	X	X	X	X	8

Sheet B	1	2	3	4	5	6	7	8	9	10	Final
Mike Fournier	2	1	0	1	0	2	4	X	X	X	10
Ben Vézeau	0	0	1	0	1	0	0	X	X	X	2

Sheet C	1	2	3	4	5	6	7	8	9	10	Final
François Gagné	0	1	0	1	0	1	1	1	1	0	6
Jeffrey Stewart	1	0	3	0	1	0	0	0	0	3	8

Sheet D	1	2	3	4	5	6	7	8	9	10	Final
Mark Homan	0	2	0	2	0	0	3	2	3	X	12
Robert Desjardins	2	0	1	0	1	1	0	0	0	X	5

=== Draw 9 ===
Wednesday, February 7, 10:00

Sheet A	1	2	3	4	5	6	7	8	9	10	Final
Robert Desjardins	0	1	0	0	2	1	0	5	X	X	9
Marcel Marchand	0	0	1	1	0	0	2	0	X	X	4

Sheet B	1	2	3	4	5	6	7	8	9	10	Final
Pier-Luc Trépanier	3	0	0	1	1	0	2	1	0	0	8
François Gagné	0	4	3	0	0	2	0	0	0	2	11

Sheet C	1	2	3	4	5	6	7	8	9	10	Final
Mike Fournier	2	0	0	1	0	1	0	0	2	1	7
Jean-Michel Ménard	0	0	1	0	2	0	1	0	0	0	4

Sheet D	1	2	3	4	5	6	7	8	9	10	11	Final
Yannick Martel	0	0	1	0	1	0	3	1	0	1	0	7
Martin Ferland	1	0	0	3	0	1	0	0	2	0	1	8

=== Draw 10 ===
Wednesday, February 7, 14:30

Sheet A	1	2	3	4	5	6	7	8	9	10	Final
Ben Vézeau	0	0	1	0	0	0	0	0	X	X	1
Jeffrey Stewart	0	0	0	2	1	0	0	1	X	X	4

Sheet B	1	2	3	4	5	6	7	8	9	10	Final
Vincent Roberge	1	0	0	0	2	0	5	X	X	X	8
Mark Homan	0	0	1	1	0	1	0	X	X	X	3

Sheet C	1	2	3	4	5	6	7	8	9	10	Final
Vincent Bourget	1	0	1	0	0	0	2	0	0	X	4
Yannick Martel	0	2	0	1	1	1	0	2	1	X	8

Sheet D	1	2	3	4	5	6	7	8	9	10	Final
Mike Fournier	2	0	1	0	0	1	1	0	0	X	5
Simon Dupuis	0	1	0	0	1	0	0	0	1	X	3

=== Draw 11 ===
Wednesday, February 7, 19:00

Sheet A	1	2	3	4	5	6	7	8	9	10	Final
François Gagné	0	0	1	0	X	X	X	X	X	X	1
Jean-Michel Ménard	5	2	0	3	X	X	X	X	X	X	10

Sheet B	1	2	3	4	5	6	7	8	9	10	Final
Martin Ferland	1	0	1	0	2	1	0	2	X	X	7
Robert Desjardins	0	0	0	1	0	0	1	0	X	X	2

Sheet C	1	2	3	4	5	6	7	8	9	10	Final
Simon Dupuis	0	0	0	1	3	1	0	2	X	X	7
Ben Vézeau	0	0	1	0	0	0	1	0	X	X	2

Sheet D	1	2	3	4	5	6	7	8	9	10	Final
Vincent Roberge	0	2	0	1	0	0	3	0	3	X	9
Vincent Bourget	1	0	1	0	1	0	0	1	0	X	4

=== Tiebreakers ===
Thursday, February 8, 10:00

Sheet B	1	2	3	4	5	6	7	8	9	10	Final
Jeffrey Stewart	0	1	0	2	0	3	0	X	X	X	6
Simon Dupuis	0	0	1	0	1	0	1	X	X	X	3

Sheet C	1	2	3	4	5	6	7	8	9	10	Final
Robert Desjardins	2	0	0	0	4	1	X	X	X	X	7
Yannick Martel	0	0	0	1	0	0	X	X	X	X	1

== Championship Round ==
Final Standings

Key
Teams to Playoffs

Skip	W	L
Ménard	8	1
Ferland	8	1
Roberge	6	3
Fournier	6	3
Desjardins	5	4
Stewart	3	6

=== Draw 13 ===
Thursday, February 8, 14:30

Sheet A	1	2	3	4	5	6	7	8	9	10	Final
Jean-Michel Ménard	0	1	0	0	5	0	0	2	X	X	8
Vincent Roberge	0	0	0	1	0	1	1	0	X	X	3

Sheet B	1	2	3	4	5	6	7	8	9	10	Final
Jeffrey Stewart	0	0	0	0	0	3	0	1	0	X	4
Martin Ferland	2	1	0	0	0	0	1	0	3	X	7

Sheet C	1	2	3	4	5	6	7	8	9	10	Final
Mike Fournier	0	0	1	0	0	0	X	X	X	X	1
Robert Desjardins	1	2	0	0	3	1	X	X	X	X	7

=== Draw 14 ===
Thursday, February 8, 19:30

Sheet A	1	2	3	4	5	6	7	8	9	10	Final
Robert Desjardins	2	0	0	0	2	0	0	1	2	2	9
Jeffrey Stewart	0	2	0	0	0	3	0	0	0	0	5

Sheet B	1	2	3	4	5	6	7	8	9	10	Final
Mike Fournier	1	0	2	1	1	0	1	0	0	X	6
Vincent Roberge	0	2	0	0	0	2	0	2	4	X	10

Sheet C	1	2	3	4	5	6	7	8	9	10	Final
Jean-Michel Ménard	0	4	0	2	0	2	0	2	X	X	10
Martin Ferland	1	0	1	0	2	0	1	0	X	X	5

=== Draw 15 ===
Friday, February 9, 10:00

Sheet A	1	2	3	4	5	6	7	8	9	10	Final
Mike Fournier	0	0	0	0	1	0	1	0	X	X	2
Martin Ferland	2	0	0	1	0	2	0	2	X	X	7

Sheet B	1	2	3	4	5	6	7	8	9	10	Final
Jean-Michel Ménard	0	3	0	0	2	0	0	0	3	X	8
Robert Desjardins	1	0	1	0	0	1	1	1	0	X	5

Sheet C	1	2	3	4	5	6	7	8	9	10	Final
Vincent Roberge	0	1	0	1	2	1	1	0	1	1	8
Jeffrey Stewart	2	0	2	0	0	0	0	2	0	0	6

== Playoffs ==
Page playoff system
1	Jean-Michel Ménard	10
2	Martin Ferland	5
3	Vincent Roberge	4
4	Mike Fournier	7

Semifinal
2	Martin Ferland	8
4	Mike Fournier	9

Final
1	Jean-Michel Ménard	5
4	Mike Fournier	7

=== 1 vs 2 ===
Friday, February 9, 19:30

Team	1	2	3	4	5	6	7	8	9	10	Final
Jean-Michel Ménard	1	0	3	0	0	0	1	0	2	3	10
Martin Ferland	0	1	0	2	0	0	0	2	0	0	5

=== 3 vs 4 ===
Saturday, February 10, 10:00

Team	1	2	3	4	5	6	7	8	9	10	Final
Vincent Roberge	0	2	0	0	0	2	0	0	X	X	4
Mike Fournier	1	0	2	3	0	0	1	0	X	X	7

=== Semifinal ===
Saturday, February 10, 19:30

Team	1	2	3	4	5	6	7	8	9	10	11	Final
Martin Ferland	0	3	0	4	0	1	0	0	0	0	0	8
Mike Fournier	0	0	2	0	3	0	1	1	0	1	1	9

=== Final ===
Sunday, February 11, 12:00

Team	1	2	3	4	5	6	7	8	9	10	Final
Jean-Michel Ménard	0	1	1	0	0	2	1	0	0	0	5
Mike Fournier	1	0	0	0	2	0	0	2	1	1	7

2018 WFG Tankard

Mike Fournier
1st Quebec Provincial Championship title
