= 2018 Tim Hortons Brier =

- Host city: Regina, Saskatchewan
- Arena: Brandt Centre
- Dates: March 3 – 11
- Attendance: 110,555
- Winner: Canada
- Curling club: Bally Haly G&CC & St. John's CC, St. John's
- Skip: Brad Gushue
- Third: Mark Nichols
- Second: Brett Gallant
- Lead: Geoff Walker
- Alternate: Tom Sallows
- Coach: Jules Owchar
- Finalist: Alberta (Brendan Bottcher)

The 2018 Tim Hortons Brier, Canada's national men's curling championship, was held from March 3 to 11, 2018 at the Brandt Centre in Regina, Saskatchewan. The winning team represented Canada at the 2018 World Men's Curling Championship from March 31 to April 8 at the Orleans Arena in Las Vegas, United States.

This marked the fifth time the Brier was held in Regina, the first time since 2006.

The 2018 tournament was the first to use a new 16-team format, featuring representation by all fourteen member associations of Curling Canada, alongside the defending champions (as Team Canada), and a new wildcard team. As part of this new format, the Bronze medal game was removed from the schedule.

== Teams ==
Curling Canada introduced a new 16-team format for both the Brier and Tournament of Hearts for 2018, under which all 14 member associations of Curling Canada are now represented in the main field, rather than being limited by a pre-qualifying tournament. The teams were divided into two pools for round robin play, after which the top four teams from each advanced to a Championship Pool. Alongside the inclusion of the previous year's champions as Team Canada, the final spot in the tournament was filled by a wildcard play-in game held on the Friday before the tournament.

The rinks of John Epping (Ontario), Mike Fournier (Quebec), and Greg Smith (Newfoundland and Labrador) made their Brier debuts.

Team Canada's Brad Gushue set a new record for the most Canadian national men's championship game wins as a skip when he skipped the 114th victory of his Brier career over the Northwest Territories on March 5.

Canada	Alberta	British Columbia	Manitoba
Bally Haly G&CC & St. John's CC, St. John's Skip: Brad Gushue; Third: Mark Nichols; Second: Brett Gallant; Lead: Geoff Walker; Alternate: Tom Sallows	Saville SC, Edmonton Skip: Brendan Bottcher; Third: Darren Moulding; Second: Brad Thiessen; Lead: Karrick Martin	(Note: British Columbia's alternate Brad Wood threw lead stones after the fourth end during Draw 2, because lead David Harper abruptly left the tournament to join his wife for the birth of their second child. Wood continued to throw lead stones for the rest of the Brier except for Draw 10; Harper returned to throw lead stones against Newfoundland and Labrador before leaving once again. Before Team BC's placement round match, third Jeff Richard left to join his wife for the birth of their child; in their game against New Brunswick, second Andrew Nerpin threw third stones, while alternate Brad Wood and Nerpin split the throwing of second stones.)Kelowna CC, Kelowna Skip: Sean Geall; Third: Jeff Richard; Second: Andrew Nerpin; Lead: David Harper; Alternate: Brad Wood	West St. Paul CC, West St. Paul Skip: Reid Carruthers; Third: Braeden Moskowy; Second: Derek Samagalski; Lead: Colin Hodgson
New Brunswick	Newfoundland and Labrador	Northern Ontario	Nova Scotia
Gage G&CC, Oromocto Skip: James Grattan; Third: Chris Jeffrey; Second: Andy McCann; Lead: Peter Case; Alternate: Brian King	Bally Haly G&CC & St. John's CC, St. John's Skip: Greg Smith; Third: Matthew Hunt; Second: Andrew Taylor; Lead: Ian Withycombe; Alternate: Connor Stapleton	Community First CC, Sault Ste. Marie Skip: Brad Jacobs; Third: Ryan Fry; Second: E.J. Harnden; Lead: Ryan Harnden (Note: Northern Ontario's alternate Tanner Horgan threw lead stones during Draws 9, 19 & 20; lead Ryan Harnden was hospitalized with an illness for a day during Draws 19 and 20.); Alternate: Tanner Horgan	Halifax CC, Halifax Skip: Jamie Murphy; Third: Paul Flemming; Second: Scott Saccary; Lead: Phil Crowell
Ontario	Prince Edward Island	Quebec	Saskatchewan
Leaside CC, East York, Toronto Skip: John Epping; Third: Mat Camm; Second: Pat Janssen; Lead: Tim March	Charlottetown CC, Charlottetown Skip: Eddie MacKenzie; Third: Josh Barry; Second: Christopher Gallant; Lead: Sean Ledgerwood; Alternate: Robbie Younker	Glenmore CC, Dollard-des-Ormeaux & CC Valleyfield, Salaberry-de-Valleyfield Skip: Mike Fournier; Third: Félix Asselin; Second: William Dion; Lead: Jean-François Trépanier (Note: During Draw 9, Quebec's alternate Émile Asselin threw lead stones for the last 3 ends.); Alternate: Émile Asselin	Nutana CC, Saskatoon Fourth: Matt Dunstone; Skip: Steve Laycock; Second: Kirk Muyres; Lead: Dallan Muyres; Alternate: Lyle Muyres
Northwest Territories	Nunavut	Yukon	(Manitoba) Wildcard
Yellowknife CC, Yellowknife Skip: Jamie Koe; Third: Chris Schille; Second: Brad Chorostkowski; Lead: Robert Borden	Iqaluit CC, Iqaluit Skip: Dave St. Louis; Third: Wade Kingdon; Second: Peter Mackey; Lead: Jeff Nadeau	Whitehorse CC, Whitehorse Skip: Thomas Scoffin; Third: Tom Appelman; Second: Wade Scoffin (Note: During Draw 8, Yukon's Wade Scoffin threw second stones for six ends; lead Steve Fecteau threw second stones for three ends, while alternate Clint Ireland threw lead stones for three ends.); Lead: Steve Fecteau; Alternate: Clint Ireland	Fort Rouge CC, Winnipeg Skip: Mike McEwen; Third: B.J. Neufeld; Second: Matt Wozniak; Lead: Denni Neufeld

=== CTRS ranking ===
Member Association (Skip)	Rank	Points
(Manitoba) Wildcard (McEwen)	2	365.181
Canada (Gushue)	3	361.585
Manitoba (Carruthers)	4	270.599
Northern Ontario (Jacobs)	5	265.245
Alberta (Bottcher)	7	233.333
Ontario (Epping)	8	212.384
Saskatchewan (Laycock)	12	140.208
Nova Scotia (Murphy)	28	85.656
British Columbia (Geall)	31	78.758
Quebec (Fournier)	49	53.503
New Brunswick (Grattan)	74	34.131
Yukon (Scoffin)	155	5.038
Northwest Territories (Koe)	156	4.725
Newfoundland and Labrador (Smith)	156	4.725
Prince Edward Island (MacKenzie)	NR	0.000
Nunavut (St. Louis)	NR	0.000

== Wildcard game ==
A play-in game was held on March 2, 2018 that determined the wildcard team that rounded out the tournament field. It was played between the top two teams on the Canadian Team Ranking System standings who lost in their provincial championship: the Fort Rouge Curling Club's Mike McEwen rink and the Granite Curling Club's Jason Gunnlaugson rink, both from Winnipeg.

CTRS standings as of February 12

Rank	Team	Member Association	Eligibility
1	~~Kevin Koe~~	Alberta	Qualified for Olympics (ineligible)
2	Mike McEwen	Manitoba	Eliminated from provincials
3	~~Brad Gushue~~	Newfoundland and Labrador	Qualified as Team Canada (ineligible)
4	~~Reid Carruthers~~	Manitoba	Won Manitoba provincials
5	~~Brad Jacobs~~	Northern Ontario	Won Northern Ontario provincials
6	Jason Gunnlaugson	Manitoba	Eliminated from provincials

Wildcard Game

Friday, March 2, 19:00

Team	1	2	3	4	5	6	7	8	9	10	11	Final
(Manitoba) Mike McEwen	0	0	1	0	0	0	0	1	0	1	1	4
(Manitoba) Jason Gunnlaugson 🔨	0	0	0	0	1	1	0	0	1	0	0	3

Player percentages
(Manitoba) Team McEwen		(Manitoba) Team Gunnlaugson	
Denni Neufeld	92%	Connor Njegovan	68%
Matt Wozniak	93%	Ian McMillan	93%
B.J. Neufeld	74%	Alex Forrest	92%
Mike McEwen	93%	Jason Gunnlaugson	74%
Total	88%	Total	82%

== Map of teams ==
Team Canada Provincial Winners Wild-Card Team

== Round-robin standings ==
Key
Teams to Championship Round
Teams to Placement Draw

Pool A	Skip	W	L	PF	PA	EW	EL	BE	SE	S%
Alberta	Brendan Bottcher	6	1	50	31	30	19	7	11	85%
Canada	Brad Gushue	6	1	55	31	29	23	7	6	90%
(Manitoba) Wildcard	Mike McEwen	5	2	43	31	25	22	14	7	86%
Nova Scotia	Jamie Murphy	4	3	44	44	31	29	8	9	85%
Northwest Territories	Jamie Koe	3	4	36	46	25	28	8	7	78%
British Columbia	Sean Geall	2	5	40	53	25	32	6	6	78%
Newfoundland and Labrador	Greg Smith	1	6	32	58	20	34	9	3	75%
Yukon	Thomas Scoffin	1	6	31	44	26	25	11	7	78%

Pool B	Skip	W	L	PF	PA	EW	EL	BE	SE	S%
Northern Ontario	Brad Jacobs	6	1	45	29	29	21	12	9	87%
Ontario	John Epping	6	1	62	30	30	26	7	6	86%
Manitoba	Reid Carruthers	5	2	55	42	29	26	8	6	85%
Saskatchewan	Steve Laycock	4	3	45	37	27	25	12	9	84%
Quebec	Mike Fournier	3	4	38	41	28	24	12	7	82%
New Brunswick	James Grattan	2	5	42	50	28	32	7	9	83%
Prince Edward Island	Eddie MacKenzie	2	5	49	56	27	28	7	6	81%
Nunavut	Dave St. Louis	0	7	22	73	18	34	5	1	67%

== Round-robin results ==
All draw times are listed in Central Standard Time (UTC−06:00).

=== Draw 1 ===
Saturday, March 3, 14:00

Sheet A	1	2	3	4	5	6	7	8	9	10	Final
New Brunswick (Grattan)	0	2	0	2	1	0	0	2	2	X	9
Nunavut (St. Louis) 🔨	1	0	1	0	0	1	0	0	0	X	3

Sheet B	1	2	3	4	5	6	7	8	9	10	Final
Saskatchewan (Laycock)	1	0	0	1	0	0	0	0	0	X	2
Quebec (Fournier) 🔨	0	0	1	0	0	1	0	2	1	X	5

Sheet C	1	2	3	4	5	6	7	8	9	10	Final
Prince Edward Island (MacKenzie)	0	0	4	0	0	1	0	2	X	X	7
Manitoba (Carruthers) 🔨	3	3	0	1	2	0	3	0	X	X	12

Sheet D	1	2	3	4	5	6	7	8	9	10	Final
Northern Ontario (Jacobs) 🔨	0	1	0	0	1	0	0	1	0	1	4
Ontario (Epping)	0	0	1	0	0	0	1	0	1	0	3

=== Draw 2 ===
Saturday, March 3, 19:00

Sheet A	1	2	3	4	5	6	7	8	9	10	Final
Canada (Gushue) 🔨	0	4	0	0	0	4	2	0	X	X	10
British Columbia (Geall)	0	0	0	0	1	0	0	1	X	X	2

Sheet B	1	2	3	4	5	6	7	8	9	10	Final
Northwest Territories (Koe)	0	2	0	2	0	2	1	1	0	1	9
Newfoundland and Labrador (Smith) 🔨	1	0	2	0	4	0	0	0	0	0	7

Sheet C	1	2	3	4	5	6	7	8	9	10	11	Final
Nova Scotia (Murphy)	0	0	2	0	2	1	0	1	0	0	1	7
Alberta (Bottcher) 🔨	0	0	0	2	0	0	2	0	1	1	0	6

Sheet D	1	2	3	4	5	6	7	8	9	10	Final
(Manitoba) Wildcard (McEwen) 🔨	3	0	0	0	0	2	0	0	0	X	5
Yukon (Scoffin)	0	0	1	1	0	0	0	0	1	X	3

=== Draw 3 ===
Sunday, March 4, 09:00

Sheet A	1	2	3	4	5	6	7	8	9	10	11	Final
Saskatchewan (Laycock)	0	0	0	2	0	1	0	0	1	1	0	5
Manitoba (Carruthers) 🔨	0	1	0	0	2	0	1	1	0	0	2	7

Sheet B	1	2	3	4	5	6	7	8	9	10	11	Final
New Brunswick (Grattan) 🔨	1	0	0	1	1	0	1	1	1	1	0	7
Ontario (Epping)	0	3	2	0	0	2	0	0	0	0	2	9

Sheet C	1	2	3	4	5	6	7	8	9	10	Final
Northern Ontario (Jacobs) 🔨	2	1	0	0	2	1	0	0	0	X	6
Nunavut (St. Louis)	0	0	0	1	0	0	0	1	1	X	3

Sheet D	1	2	3	4	5	6	7	8	9	10	Final
Prince Edward Island (MacKenzie)	1	0	0	0	1	0	0	3	0	2	7
Quebec (Fournier) 🔨	0	0	3	0	0	0	2	0	1	0	6

=== Draw 4 ===
Sunday, March 4, 14:00

Sheet A	1	2	3	4	5	6	7	8	9	10	Final
Northwest Territories (Koe)	0	0	0	0	0	2	0	0	X	X	2
Alberta (Bottcher) 🔨	0	2	2	2	1	0	1	1	X	X	9

Sheet B	1	2	3	4	5	6	7	8	9	10	Final
Canada (Gushue)	2	2	0	2	1	0	1	0	X	X	8
Yukon (Scoffin) 🔨	0	0	1	0	0	1	0	1	X	X	3

Sheet C	1	2	3	4	5	6	7	8	9	10	Final
(Manitoba) Wildcard (McEwen)	1	2	0	0	3	0	2	1	X	X	9
British Columbia (Geall) 🔨	0	0	1	1	0	1	0	0	X	X	3

Sheet D	1	2	3	4	5	6	7	8	9	10	Final
Nova Scotia (Murphy)	0	2	0	1	0	0	3	2	1	X	9
Newfoundland and Labrador (Smith) 🔨	1	0	3	0	1	1	0	0	0	X	6

=== Draw 5 ===
Sunday, March 4, 19:00

Sheet A	1	2	3	4	5	6	7	8	9	10	Final
Northern Ontario (Jacobs)	0	1	0	2	4	2	0	0	X	X	9
Prince Edward Island (MacKenzie) 🔨	1	0	2	0	0	0	1	1	X	X	5

Sheet B	1	2	3	4	5	6	7	8	9	10	Final
Nunavut (St. Louis)	0	0	2	0	0	1	0	2	X	X	5
Manitoba (Carruthers) 🔨	2	1	0	2	4	0	3	0	X	X	12

Sheet C	1	2	3	4	5	6	7	8	9	10	Final
Ontario (Epping) 🔨	3	0	1	0	2	0	1	0	X	X	7
Quebec (Fournier)	0	1	0	1	0	0	0	1	X	X	3

Sheet D	1	2	3	4	5	6	7	8	9	10	Final
New Brunswick (Grattan) 🔨	0	3	0	0	0	0	1	0	X	X	4
Saskatchewan (Laycock)	2	0	2	1	1	1	0	2	X	X	9

=== Draw 6 ===
Monday, March 5, 09:00

Sheet A	1	2	3	4	5	6	7	8	9	10	Final
(Manitoba) Wildcard (McEwen) 🔨	1	0	0	0	2	0	0	0	0	3	6
Nova Scotia (Murphy)	0	0	1	0	0	0	2	1	1	0	5

Sheet B	1	2	3	4	5	6	7	8	9	10	Final
British Columbia (Geall)	0	0	4	1	0	1	0	0	2	0	8
Alberta (Bottcher) 🔨	1	0	0	0	2	0	2	3	0	1	9

Sheet C	1	2	3	4	5	6	7	8	9	10	Final
Yukon (Scoffin)	0	1	0	1	0	0	2	0	1	1	6
Newfoundland and Labrador (Smith) 🔨	1	0	1	0	2	0	0	3	0	0	7

Sheet D	1	2	3	4	5	6	7	8	9	10	Final
Canada (Gushue) 🔨	1	0	0	2	0	2	0	3	X	X	8
Northwest Territories (Koe)	0	0	2	0	1	0	1	0	X	X	4

=== Draw 7 ===
Monday, March 5, 14:00

Sheet A	1	2	3	4	5	6	7	8	9	10	Final
Manitoba (Carruthers)	0	2	0	2	0	3	0	0	2	X	9
Quebec (Fournier) 🔨	1	0	1	0	1	0	2	1	0	X	6

Sheet B	1	2	3	4	5	6	7	8	9	10	Final
Northern Ontario (Jacobs) 🔨	1	1	0	2	1	0	3	0	1	X	9
New Brunswick (Grattan)	0	0	1	0	0	2	0	1	0	X	4

Sheet C	1	2	3	4	5	6	7	8	9	10	11	Final
Saskatchewan (Laycock)	0	0	1	0	2	0	1	0	2	0	1	7
Prince Edward Island (MacKenzie) 🔨	0	0	0	3	0	1	0	1	0	1	0	6

Sheet D	1	2	3	4	5	6	7	8	9	10	Final
Ontario (Epping) 🔨	2	1	3	3	0	1	0	4	X	X	14
Nunavut (St. Louis)	0	0	0	0	2	0	1	0	X	X	3

=== Draw 8 ===
Monday, March 5, 19:00

Sheet A	1	2	3	4	5	6	7	8	9	10	Final
Alberta (Bottcher) 🔨	1	0	1	1	2	0	4	0	X	X	9
Newfoundland and Labrador (Smith)	0	0	0	0	0	2	0	0	X	X	2

Sheet B	1	2	3	4	5	6	7	8	9	10	Final
(Manitoba) Wildcard (McEwen)	0	2	0	1	0	1	0	0	1	X	5
Canada (Gushue) 🔨	2	0	2	0	1	0	0	1	0	X	6

Sheet C	1	2	3	4	5	6	7	8	9	10	Final
Northwest Territories (Koe) 🔨	1	0	0	1	1	0	0	1	1	2	7
Nova Scotia (Murphy)	0	1	0	0	0	1	1	0	0	0	3

Sheet D	1	2	3	4	5	6	7	8	9	10	Final
Yukon (Scoffin)	0	1	1	1	0	0	2	1	2	X	8
British Columbia (Geall) 🔨	1	0	0	0	1	0	0	0	0	X	2

=== Draw 9 ===
Tuesday, March 6, 09:00

Sheet A	1	2	3	4	5	6	7	8	9	10	Final
Prince Edward Island (MacKenzie)	0	0	0	2	0	2	0	2	0	0	6
New Brunswick (Grattan) 🔨	0	1	0	0	1	0	2	0	3	2	9

Sheet B	1	2	3	4	5	6	7	8	9	10	Final
Quebec (Fournier) 🔨	3	2	0	2	0	0	1	0	X	X	8
Nunavut (St. Louis)	0	0	1	0	0	1	0	1	X	X	3

Sheet C	1	2	3	4	5	6	7	8	9	10	Final
Manitoba (Carruthers)	0	2	0	1	0	1	0	1	0	X	5
Ontario (Epping) 🔨	1	0	1	0	2	0	1	0	5	X	10

Sheet D	1	2	3	4	5	6	7	8	9	10	Final
Saskatchewan (Laycock) 🔨	0	0	4	0	0	3	0	1	0	X	8
Northern Ontario (Jacobs)	0	0	0	1	1	0	1	0	1	X	4

=== Draw 10 ===
Tuesday, March 6, 14:00

Sheet A	1	2	3	4	5	6	7	8	9	10	Final
Nova Scotia (Murphy)	0	1	0	1	0	2	0	1	0	X	5
Canada (Gushue) 🔨	1	0	2	0	2	0	2	0	2	X	9

Sheet B	1	2	3	4	5	6	7	8	9	10	Final
Newfoundland and Labrador (Smith)	1	3	0	0	0	1	0	1	0	X	6
British Columbia (Geall) 🔨	0	0	3	2	4	0	1	0	2	X	12

Sheet C	1	2	3	4	5	6	7	8	9	10	Final
Alberta (Bottcher)	1	0	2	0	0	0	2	0	2	X	7
Yukon (Scoffin) 🔨	0	2	0	1	0	1	0	1	0	X	5

Sheet D	1	2	3	4	5	6	7	8	9	10	Final
Northwest Territories (Koe)	0	0	0	0	1	0	0	2	X	X	3
(Manitoba) Wildcard (McEwen) 🔨	1	3	2	1	0	3	0	0	X	X	10

=== Draw 11 ===
Tuesday, March 6, 19:00

Sheet A	1	2	3	4	5	6	7	8	9	10	Final
Quebec (Fournier) 🔨	1	0	0	1	0	0	1	0	0	X	3
Northern Ontario (Jacobs)	0	0	2	0	3	0	0	1	1	X	7

Sheet B	1	2	3	4	5	6	7	8	9	10	Final
Ontario (Epping)	0	3	0	3	0	2	0	3	X	X	11
Prince Edward Island (MacKenzie) 🔨	1	0	1	0	1	0	1	0	X	X	4

Sheet C	1	2	3	4	5	6	7	8	9	10	Final
Nunavut (St. Louis)	0	2	0	0	0	0	0	1	X	X	3
Saskatchewan (Laycock) 🔨	2	0	2	1	1	4	0	0	X	X	10

Sheet D	1	2	3	4	5	6	7	8	9	10	Final
Manitoba (Carruthers) 🔨	0	2	0	1	0	0	2	0	2	X	7
New Brunswick (Grattan)	0	0	0	0	1	1	0	1	0	X	3

=== Draw 12 ===
Wednesday, March 7, 09:00

Sheet A	1	2	3	4	5	6	7	8	9	10	Final
Newfoundland and Labrador (Smith)	0	0	0	0	1	0	1	0	0	X	2
(Manitoba) Wildcard (McEwen) 🔨	0	1	0	1	0	2	0	2	0	X	6

Sheet B	1	2	3	4	5	6	7	8	9	10	Final
Yukon (Scoffin)	0	0	1	0	1	0	0	0	2	X	4
Nova Scotia (Murphy) 🔨	0	2	0	2	0	0	2	1	0	X	7

Sheet C	1	2	3	4	5	6	7	8	9	10	Final
British Columbia (Geall)	0	0	2	1	0	1	0	2	1	X	7
Northwest Territories (Koe) 🔨	1	0	0	0	1	0	1	0	0	X	3

Sheet D	1	2	3	4	5	6	7	8	9	10	Final
Alberta (Bottcher)	1	0	1	0	3	0	2	0	3	X	10
Canada (Gushue) 🔨	0	3	0	1	0	1	0	2	0	X	7

=== Draw 13 ===
Wednesday, March 7, 14:00

Sheet A	1	2	3	4	5	6	7	8	9	10	Final
Ontario (Epping)	1	0	0	1	0	0	2	0	4	X	8
Saskatchewan (Laycock) 🔨	0	0	2	0	0	0	0	2	0	X	4

Sheet B	1	2	3	4	5	6	7	8	9	10	Final
Manitoba (Carruthers) 🔨	0	0	2	0	0	0	0	1	0	X	3
Northern Ontario (Jacobs)	0	0	0	2	2	0	0	0	2	X	6

Sheet C	1	2	3	4	5	6	7	8	9	10	11	Final
Quebec (Fournier) 🔨	2	1	0	0	0	1	0	1	0	1	1	7
New Brunswick (Grattan)	0	0	3	0	1	0	0	0	2	0	0	6

Sheet D	1	2	3	4	5	6	7	8	9	10	Final
Nunavut (St. Louis) 🔨	0	1	0	0	0	0	1	X	X	X	2
Prince Edward Island (MacKenzie)	4	0	4	3	1	2	0	X	X	X	14

=== Draw 14 ===
Wednesday, March 7, 19:00

Sheet A	1	2	3	4	5	6	7	8	9	10	Final
Yukon (Scoffin)	0	0	1	0	1	0	0	0	X	X	2
Northwest Territories (Koe) 🔨	0	2	0	3	0	0	2	1	X	X	8

Sheet B	1	2	3	4	5	6	7	8	9	10	Final
Alberta (Bottcher)	0	0	0	1	2	5	0	1	X	X	9
(Manitoba) Wildcard (McEwen) 🔨	0	1	0	0	0	0	1	0	X	X	2

Sheet C	1	2	3	4	5	6	7	8	9	10	Final
Newfoundland and Labrador (Smith) 🔨	0	0	0	1	0	0	1	0	X	X	2
Canada (Gushue)	2	1	0	0	0	2	0	2	X	X	7

Sheet D	1	2	3	4	5	6	7	8	9	10	Final
British Columbia (Geall)	0	2	0	1	0	0	2	0	1	0	6
Nova Scotia (Murphy) 🔨	1	0	2	0	1	1	0	1	0	2	8

== Placement round ==
Each team that finished fifth through eight in their pool played the team that finished in the same position in the opposite pool for the purpose of determining final tournament ranking. For example, the winner of the game between fifth place teams was ranked ninth place overall, the loser of that game was ranked tenth place, and so on.

=== Seeding games ===
All game times are listed in Central Standard Time (UTC−06:00).

==== A5 vs. B5 ====
Friday, March 9, 09:00

Sheet B	1	2	3	4	5	6	7	8	9	10	Final
Northwest Territories (Koe) 🔨	2	1	0	0	1	0	0	2	0	0	6
Quebec (Fournier)	0	0	2	0	0	1	0	0	0	1	4

==== A6 vs. B6 ====
Friday, March 9, 09:00

Sheet C	1	2	3	4	5	6	7	8	9	10	Final
British Columbia (Geall)	0	2	0	1	0	0	1	1	X	X	5
New Brunswick (Grattan) 🔨	3	0	2	0	0	7	0	0	X	X	12

==== A7 vs. B7 ====
Friday, March 9, 09:00

Sheet D	1	2	3	4	5	6	7	8	9	10	Final
Newfoundland and Labrador (Smith)	0	1	0	0	1	0	0	1	X	X	3
Prince Edward Island (MacKenzie) 🔨	4	0	3	1	0	3	1	0	X	X	12

==== A8 vs. B8 ====
Friday, March 9, 09:00

Sheet A	1	2	3	4	5	6	7	8	9	10	Final
Yukon (Scoffin) 🔨	1	1	0	1	0	0	3	0	0	1	7
Nunavut (St. Louis)	0	0	1	0	1	3	0	0	1	0	6

== Championship pool standings ==
All wins and losses earned in the round robin (including results against teams that failed to advance) were carried forward into the Championship Pool.

Key
Teams to Playoffs
Teams to Tiebreakers

Team	Skip	W	L	PF	PA	EW	EL	BE	SE	S%
Canada	Brad Gushue	10	1	77	44	43	35	21	6	91%
Ontario	John Epping	9	2	91	55	49	44	11	10	87%
Alberta	Brendan Bottcher	8	3	89	45	51	35	14	17	85%
Northern Ontario	Brad Jacobs	8	3	65	48	42	32	22	13	87%
(Manitoba) Wildcard	Mike McEwen	7	4	65	54	38	35	22	9	86%
Saskatchewan	Steve Laycock	6	5	68	59	44	41	20	11	86%
Nova Scotia	Jamie Murphy	5	6	66	70	46	50	11	12	84%
Manitoba	Reid Carruthers	5	6	67	72	40	41	20	11	83%

== Championship pool results ==
All draw times are listed in Central Standard Time (UTC−06:00).

=== Draw 15 ===
Thursday, March 8, 14:00

Sheet A	1	2	3	4	5	6	7	8	9	10	Final
Saskatchewan (Laycock) 🔨	2	0	1	0	2	0	0	3	0	0	8
Alberta (Bottcher)	0	2	0	1	0	0	2	0	0	1	6

Sheet B	1	2	3	4	5	6	7	8	9	10	Final
Canada (Gushue) 🔨	0	2	0	3	0	0	0	2	X	X	7
Manitoba (Carruthers)	0	0	1	0	0	0	1	0	X	X	2

Sheet C	1	2	3	4	5	6	7	8	9	10	Final
Northern Ontario (Jacobs) 🔨	1	0	1	2	0	0	1	1	0	X	6
Nova Scotia (Murphy)	0	2	0	0	0	0	0	0	2	X	4

Sheet D	1	2	3	4	5	6	7	8	9	10	Final
(Manitoba) Wildcard (McEwen) 🔨	2	0	0	2	0	2	0	1	0	0	7
Ontario (Epping)	0	1	0	0	2	0	1	0	2	2	8

=== Draw 16 ===
Thursday, March 8, 19:00

Sheet A	1	2	3	4	5	6	7	8	9	10	Final
Nova Scotia (Murphy)	1	2	0	1	0	1	0	1	0	0	6
Ontario (Epping) 🔨	0	0	2	0	2	0	1	0	2	1	8

Sheet B	1	2	3	4	5	6	7	8	9	10	Final
Northern Ontario (Jacobs) 🔨	6	1	0	0	1	0	X	X	X	X	8
(Manitoba) Wildcard (McEwen)	0	0	0	1	0	0	X	X	X	X	1

Sheet C	1	2	3	4	5	6	7	8	9	10	Final
Alberta (Bottcher)	0	0	1	0	0	4	2	1	X	X	8
Manitoba (Carruthers) 🔨	0	1	0	1	0	0	0	0	X	X	2

Sheet D	1	2	3	4	5	6	7	8	9	10	11	Final
Saskatchewan (Laycock) 🔨	0	1	0	1	0	0	1	0	0	1	0	4
Canada (Gushue)	0	0	1	0	2	0	0	1	0	0	1	5

=== Draw 17 ===
Friday, March 9, 14:00

Sheet A	1	2	3	4	5	6	7	8	9	10	Final
Canada (Gushue) 🔨	0	2	0	0	0	0	2	0	0	1	5
Northern Ontario (Jacobs)	0	0	0	0	0	2	0	1	0	0	3

Sheet B	1	2	3	4	5	6	7	8	9	10	Final
Ontario (Epping) 🔨	1	0	4	0	1	0	1	0	2	0	9
Alberta (Bottcher)	0	1	0	2	0	1	0	2	0	1	7

Sheet C	1	2	3	4	5	6	7	8	9	10	Final
(Manitoba) Wildcard (McEwen) 🔨	2	0	0	0	0	1	0	2	0	1	6
Saskatchewan (Laycock)	0	0	0	1	0	0	2	0	1	0	4

Sheet D	1	2	3	4	5	6	7	8	9	10	Final
Manitoba (Carruthers) 🔨	1	0	1	0	1	0	1	0	1	0	5
Nova Scotia (Murphy)	0	3	0	2	0	1	0	0	0	1	7

=== Draw 18 ===
Friday, March 9, 19:00

Sheet A	1	2	3	4	5	6	7	8	9	10	Final
Manitoba (Carruthers)	0	0	0	0	0	1	0	2	X	X	3
(Manitoba) Wildcard (McEwen) 🔨	0	2	2	0	1	0	3	0	X	X	8

Sheet B	1	2	3	4	5	6	7	8	9	10	Final
Nova Scotia (Murphy)	0	1	1	0	1	0	2	0	0	0	5
Saskatchewan (Laycock) 🔨	1	0	0	1	0	1	0	1	2	1	7

Sheet C	1	2	3	4	5	6	7	8	9	10	11	Final
Ontario (Epping)	0	0	1	0	1	0	1	0	0	1	0	4
Canada (Gushue) 🔨	2	0	0	0	0	1	0	0	1	0	1	5

Sheet D	1	2	3	4	5	6	7	8	9	10	Final
Alberta (Bottcher)	0	1	0	1	0	1	2	0	4	X	9
Northern Ontario (Jacobs) 🔨	0	0	1	0	1	0	0	1	0	X	3

== Playoffs ==
Page playoff system
1	Canada	6
2	Ontario	2
3	Alberta	6
4	Northern Ontario	5

Semifinal
2	Ontario	4
3	Alberta	6

Final
1	Canada	6
3	Alberta	4

=== 1 vs. 2 ===
Saturday, March 10, 19:00

Team	1	2	3	4	5	6	7	8	9	10	Final
Canada (Gushue) 🔨	0	2	0	1	0	2	0	0	1	X	6
Ontario (Epping)	0	0	0	0	1	0	0	1	0	X	2

Player percentages
Canada		Ontario	
Geoff Walker	79%	Tim March	83%
Brett Gallant	88%	Pat Janssen	88%
Mark Nichols	96%	Matt Camm	79%
Brad Gushue	100%	John Epping	82%
Total	91%	Total	83%

=== 3 vs. 4 ===
Saturday, March 10, 14:00

Team	1	2	3	4	5	6	7	8	9	10	11	Final
Alberta (Bottcher) 🔨	0	1	0	1	0	1	0	0	0	2	1	6
Northern Ontario (Jacobs)	0	0	2	0	0	0	2	1	0	0	0	5

Player percentages
Alberta		Northern Ontario	
Karrick Martin	83%	Ryan Harnden	83%
Brad Thiessen	84%	E.J. Harnden	89%
Darren Moulding	70%	Ryan Fry	86%
Brendan Bottcher	82%	Brad Jacobs	85%
Total	80%	Total	86%

=== Semifinal ===
Sunday, March 11, 09:00

Team	1	2	3	4	5	6	7	8	9	10	Final
Ontario (Epping) 🔨	2	0	0	0	1	0	0	1	0	0	4
Alberta (Bottcher)	0	0	0	2	0	1	2	0	0	1	6

Player percentages
Ontario		Alberta	
Tim March	94%	Karrick Martin	94%
Pat Janssen	85%	Brad Thiessen	84%
Matt Camm	93%	Darren Moulding	80%
John Epping	84%	Brendan Bottcher	83%
Total	89%	Total	85%

=== Final ===
Sunday, March 11, 16:00

Team	1	2	3	4	5	6	7	8	9	10	Final
Canada (Gushue) 🔨	0	0	2	0	2	0	0	1	0	1	6
Alberta (Bottcher)	0	0	0	1	0	0	1	0	2	0	4

Player percentages
Canada		Alberta	
Geoff Walker	84%	Karrick Martin	89%
Brett Gallant	94%	Brad Thiessen	83%
Mark Nichols	91%	Darren Moulding	86%
Brad Gushue	96%	Brendan Bottcher	93%
Total	91%	Total	88%

== Statistics ==
=== Top 5 player percentages ===
Final Round Robin Percentages; minimum 6 games

Key
First All-Star Team
Second All-Star Team

Leads	%
WC Denni Neufeld	92
(Canada) Geoff Walker	91
(Ontario) Tim March	89
(Saskatchewan) Dallan Muyres	89
(Manitoba) Colin Hodgson	89

Seconds	%
(Canada) Brett Gallant	91
(Northern Ontario) E.J. Harnden	89
(Ontario) Pat Janssen	86
WC Matt Wozniak	86
(Alberta) Brad Thiessen	85

Thirds	%
(Canada) Mark Nichols	88
(Saskatchewan) Steve Laycock (Skip)	86
(Northern Ontario) Ryan Fry	85
(Ontario) Mat Camm	85
WC B.J. Neufeld	85

Skips	%
(Canada) Brad Gushue	93
(Ontario) John Epping	86
(Northern Ontario) Brad Jacobs	85
(Alberta) Brendan Bottcher	84
(Saskatchewan) Matt Dunstone (Fourth)	83

=== Perfect games ===
Round Robin and Championship Pool only

Player	Team	Position	Shots	Opponent
Brad Gushue	Canada	Skip	16	Yukon
B.J. Neufeld	(Manitoba) Wildcard	Third	16	Northwest Territories
Denni Neufeld	(Manitoba) Wildcard	Lead	12	Northern Ontario
Denni Neufeld	(Manitoba) Wildcard	Lead	14	Manitoba

== Awards ==
The awards and all-star teams are listed as follows:

All-Star Teams

First Team

- Skip: Brad Gushue, Team Canada
- Third: Mark Nichols, Team Canada
- Second: Brett Gallant, Team Canada
- Lead: (Manitoba) Denni Neufeld, Team Wildcard

Second Team

- Skip: John Epping, Ontario
- Third: Steve Laycock, Saskatchewan (skip; threw third stones)
- Second: E.J. Harnden, Northern Ontario
- Lead: Geoff Walker, Team Canada

Ross Harstone Sportsmanship Award

- Greg Smith, Newfoundland and Labrador Skip

Paul McLean Award

- Murray McCormick, Regina Leader-Post

Hec Gervais Most Valuable Player Award

- Brad Gushue, Team Canada Skip

== Provincial and territorial playdowns ==
- 2018 Boston Pizza Cup (Alberta)
- (British Columbia) 2018 belairdirect BC Men's Curling Championship
- 2018 Viterra Championship (Manitoba)
- (New Brunswick) 2018 Papa John's Pizza Tankard
- 2018 Newfoundland and Labrador Tankard
- 2018 NOCA Men's Provincial Championship (Northern Ontario)
- 2018 Deloitte Tankard (Nova Scotia)
- 2018 Ontario Tankard
- (Prince Edward Island) 2018 PEI Tankard
- 2018 WFG Tankard (Quebec)
- 2018 SaskTel Tankard (Saskatchewan)
- 2018 Northwest Territories Men's Curling Championship
- 2018 Yukon Men's Curling Championship
- 2018 Nunavut Brier Playdowns
