= Craig Van Ymeren =

Canadian curler

- Curler
- Born: March 10, 1989 (age 37); Aylmer, Ontario

Team
- Curling club: St. Thomas CC, St. Thomas, ON
- Skip: Travis Fanset
- Third: Aaron Squires
- Second: Craig Van Ymeren
- Lead: Scott Brandon
- Alternate: Chad Allen

Curling career
- Member Association: Ontario
Medal record
Representing Canada
Men's curling
World Junior Curling Championships
Bronze medal – third place	2010 Flims

Craig Van Ymeren (born March 10, 1989, in Aylmer, Ontario) is a Canadian curler. He currently plays second on Team Travis Fanset.

== Career ==
Van Ymeren played third for the Jake Walker rink that won the 2010 Canadian Junior Curling Championships in 2010. The team represented Canada at the 2010 World Junior Curling Championships in Flims, Switzerland where they won a bronze medal.
