= Jean-François Trépanier =

Canadian curler

- Curler
- Born: February 20, 1987 (age 39); Salaberry-de-Valleyfield, Quebec

Team
- Curling club: CC Valleyfield, Salaberry-de-Valleyfield, QC
- Skip: Martin Crête
- Third: Philippe Brassard
- Second: Jean-François Trépanier
- Lead: Philippe Ménard

Curling career
- Member Association: Quebec
- Brier: 6 (2018, 2021, 2022, 2023, 2025, 2026)
- Top CTRS ranking: 14th (2022–23)

Jean-François "J-F" Trépanier (born February 20, 1987) is a Canadian curler from Saint-Étienne-de-Beauharnois, Quebec. He currently plays second on Team Martin Crête.

== Career ==
Trépanier began playing with the Mike Fournier rink with Félix Asselin at third and William Dion at second for the 2017–18 season. He previously played for Denis Robichaud, Simon Hebert and Guy Hemmings. In their first season together, Team Fournier won the 2018 WFG Tankard. The team qualified for the playoffs as the fourth seed and won three straight games to claim the provincial title. At the 2018 Tim Hortons Brier, they finished 3–5 record, finishing in tenth place. They could not defend their provincial title the following year, losing to Martin Crête in the final of the 2019 WFG Tankard.

Trépanier qualified for his first Grand Slam of Curling event during the 2019–20 season at the 2019 Tour Challenge Tier 2. His team qualified for the playoffs with a perfect 4–0 record. They then defeated Jamie Murphy in the quarterfinals before losing to eventual winners Korey Dropkin in the semifinal. Also during the 2019–20 season, Team Fournier finished third at the 2020 Quebec Tankard.

Due to the COVID-19 pandemic in Quebec, the 2021 provincial championship was cancelled. Curling Québec then decided to appoint Team Fournier to represent Quebec at the 2021 Tim Hortons Brier in Calgary, Alberta. The event was played in a bio-secure bubble to prevent the spread of the virus. At the Brier, they finished with a 4–4 record, failing to qualify for the championship round.

In their first event of the 2021–22 season, Team Fournier reached the final of the Capital Curling Fall Open. Because of their previous successes on tour, the team had enough points to qualify for the 2021 Canadian Olympic Curling Pre-Trials. At the Pre-Trials, the team finished the round robin with a 3–3 record, missing the playoff round. Later in the season, they won the Challenge Casino de Charlevoix and reached the final of both the Stu Sells 1824 Halifax Classic and the Finale du Circuit. The Quebec Tankard was once again cancelled due to the pandemic and Team Fournier were named as the provinces representatives for the 2022 Tim Hortons Brier. At the Brier, the team finished once again with a 4–4, placing sixth in their pool. Following the season, skip Mike Fournier moved to Ontario and Félix Asselin took over as skip of the team with Émile Asselin coming in to play second.

In 2024, it was announced that Team Asselin would welcome Brier champion, Jean-Michel Ménard, as the third. Ménard, halfway through the season would begin skipping the team, with Asselin continuing to throw fourth stones. Team Ménard would win the 2025 Quebec Tankard, qualifying them to represent Quebec at the 2025 Montana's Brier. At the Brier, the team finished 4–4, missing out on the playoffs.

Team Ménard would start the 2025–26 curling season at the 2025 Canadian Olympic Curling Pre-Trials, where they would finish with a 4–3 record, narrowly missing out on the playoffs. Ménard would again win the 2026 Quebec Tankard and represent Quebec at the 2026 Montana's Brier. Prior to the Brier, Trépanier announced that he would be retiring at the end of the season. At his final Brier, Team Ménard finished 5–3, missing out on the playoffs due to the last-stone-draw tiebreaker.

== Personal life ==
Trépanier is employed as a manager at Hydro-Québec. He is married to Melissa Gilbert Paquette, and has three children.

Prior to his curling career, Trépanier played ice hockey. He spent four seasons in the Quebec Junior Hockey League playing for the Valleyfield Braves from 2004 to 2008 and played for the Botany Swarm in the New Zealand Ice Hockey League from 2008 to 2009.

== Teams ==
Season	Skip	Third	Second	Lead
2013–14	Denis Robichaud	Jean-François Trépanier	Simon Benoit	Jean-Marc Legault
2014–15	Simon Hebert	Jean-François Trépanier	Martin Trépanier	Pier-Luc Trépanier
2015–16	Guy Hemmings	Simon Benoit	Jean-François Trépanier	Martin Trépanier
2016–17	Guy Hemmings	Simon Benoit	Jean-François Trépanier	Martin Trépanier
2017–18	Mike Fournier	Félix Asselin	William Dion	Jean-François Trépanier
2018–19	Mike Fournier	Félix Asselin	William Dion	Jean-François Trépanier
2019–20	Mike Fournier	Félix Asselin	William Dion	Jean-François Trépanier
2020–21	Mike Fournier	Martin Crête	Félix Asselin	Jean-François Trépanier
2021–22	Félix Asselin (Fourth)	Martin Crête	Mike Fournier (Skip)	Jean-François Trépanier
2022–23	Félix Asselin	Martin Crête	Émile Asselin	Jean-François Trépanier
2023–24	Félix Asselin	Martin Crête	Émile Asselin	Jean-François Trépanier
2024–25	Félix Asselin (Fourth)	Jean-Michel Ménard (Skip)	Martin Crête	Jean-François Trépanier
2025–26	Félix Asselin (Fourth)	Jean-Michel Ménard (Skip)	Martin Crête	Jean-François Trépanier
2026–27	Martin Crête	Philippe Brassard	Jean-François Trépanier	Philippe Ménard
