= 2021 Canadian Curling Trials Direct-Entry Event =

- Host city: Ottawa, Ontario
- Arena: RA Centre
- Dates: September 22–26

The 2021 Canadian Curling Trials Direct-Entry Event was held from September 22 to 26 at the RA Centre in Ottawa, Ontario. The event was held to qualify two men's teams and three women's teams for the 2021 Canadian Olympic Curling Trials.

On the men's side, Teams Mike McEwen and Matt Dunstone secured the two Trials berths, both finishing 5–1 through the round robin and qualifying rounds. McEwen's only loss came to Dunstone in Draw 2 with Dunstone dropping their first game to Glenn Howard before running the table. The three teams who did not qualify, Colton Flasch, Jason Gunnlaugson, and Glenn Howard, will still have a chance to reach the Olympic Trials, as they drop into the 2021 Canadian Olympic Curling Pre-Trials.

On the women's side, Teams Casey Scheidegger, Kelsey Rocque, and Laura Walker all secured berths to the trials, beating out Corryn Brown and Suzanne Birt for the three spots. After the round robin concluded, Teams Scheidegger and Rocque both had 3–1 records, qualifying them directly to the trials. Team Walker posted a 2–2 record while Teams Brown and Birt shared 1–3 records. Due to Brown beating Birt in the round robin, they earned the spot in the playoff against Team Walker for the third spot. In the playoff, Brown needed to beat Walker twice to earn the trials spot, whereas Walker only needed one win to clinch the spot. Brown defeated Walker in the first game, however, Walker then won the second game to earn the third and final spot at the trials in Saskatoon. Teams Corryn Brown and Suzanne Birt will now play in the Pre-Trials for a second opportunity to earn their spot in the Olympic Trials.

== Qualification process ==
Five men's teams and five women's teams qualified for the event based on qualifications standards over the previous seasons. Teams who had not automatically qualified for the trials qualified for this event if they met one of the following three criteria:
• Canadian teams in the top 18 of the World Curling Team Ranking as of August 31, 2020,
• Eligible teams that finished in the top 9 of the Canadian Team Ranking System in 2019–20,
• Eligible teams that finished in the top 7 of the Canadian Team Ranking System in 2018–19.

The teams that didn't qualify for the trials via this event had a second chance to make the trials through the 2021 Canadian Olympic Curling Pre-Trials scheduled for October 26 to 31 at the Queens Place Emera Centre in Liverpool, Nova Scotia.

For the men's tournament, there were 2 spots available in the 2021 Canadian Olympic Curling Trials for direct-entry. For the women's tournament, there were 3 spots available.

== Men ==
=== Teams ===
The teams are listed as follows:

Skip	Third	Second	Lead	Club
Matt Dunstone	Braeden Moskowy	Kirk Muyres	Dustin Kidby	Highland CC, Regina, Saskatchewan
Colton Flasch	Catlin Schneider	Kevin Marsh	Dan Marsh	Nutana CC, Saskatoon, Saskatchewan
Jason Gunnlaugson	Adam Casey	Matt Wozniak	Connor Njegovan	Morris CC, Morris, Manitoba
Glenn Howard	Scott Howard	David Mathers	Tim March	Penetanguishene CC, Penetanguishene, Ontario
Mike McEwen	Reid Carruthers	Derek Samagalski	Colin Hodgson	West St. Paul CC, West St. Paul, Manitoba

=== Round Robin ===
==== Round-robin standings ====
Final round-robin standings

Team	W	L	PF	PA	EW	EL	BE	SE
(Manitoba) Mike McEwen	3	1	25	17	15	13	3	5
(Saskatchewan) Matt Dunstone	3	1	28	21	18	14	3	7
(Ontario) Glenn Howard	2	2	18	27	12	14	4	5
(Saskatchewan) Colton Flasch	1	3	20	21	12	13	2	4
(Manitoba) Jason Gunnlaugson	1	3	21	26	15	18	2	4

==== Round-robin results ====
All draw times are listed in Eastern Time (UTC−04:00).

===== Draw 1 =====
Wednesday, September 22, 8:00 pm

Sheet B	1	2	3	4	5	6	7	8	9	10	Final
(Manitoba) Mike McEwen	0	0	0	2	1	1	0	0	0	1	5
(Saskatchewan) Colton Flasch 🔨	0	1	1	0	0	0	0	1	0	0	3

Sheet C	1	2	3	4	5	6	7	8	9	10	Final
(Ontario) Glenn Howard 🔨	1	0	0	2	1	0	2	0	1	2	9
(Saskatchewan) Matt Dunstone	0	2	0	0	0	2	0	1	0	0	5

===== Draw 2 =====
Thursday, September 23, 12:00 pm

Sheet B	1	2	3	4	5	6	7	8	9	10	Final
(Saskatchewan) Matt Dunstone 🔨	0	1	0	2	0	1	1	0	2	1	8
(Manitoba) Mike McEwen	0	0	2	0	2	0	0	1	0	0	5

Sheet C	1	2	3	4	5	6	7	8	9	10	Final
(Saskatchewan) Colton Flasch	0	0	0	2	0	0	2	0	X	X	4
(Manitoba) Jason Gunnlaugson 🔨	2	1	1	0	1	1	0	2	X	X	8

===== Draw 3 =====
Thursday, September 23, 8:00 pm

Sheet B	1	2	3	4	5	6	7	8	9	10	Final
(Saskatchewan) Colton Flasch 🔨	2	4	1	0	2	X	X	X	X	X	9
(Ontario) Glenn Howard	0	0	0	0	0	X	X	X	X	X	0

Sheet C	1	2	3	4	5	6	7	8	9	10	Final
(Manitoba) Jason Gunnlaugson 🔨	0	1	0	1	0	0	2	0	0	X	4
(Manitoba) Mike McEwen	2	0	1	0	0	2	0	1	2	X	8

===== Draw 4 =====
Friday, September 24, 12:00 pm

Sheet B	1	2	3	4	5	6	7	8	9	10	Final
(Ontario) Glenn Howard	0	1	0	2	0	2	1	1	0	0	7
(Manitoba) Jason Gunnlaugson 🔨	0	0	2	0	2	0	0	0	1	1	6

Sheet C	1	2	3	4	5	6	7	8	9	10	Final
(Saskatchewan) Matt Dunstone	0	0	4	2	0	2	0	X	X	X	8
(Saskatchewan) Colton Flasch 🔨	1	0	0	0	2	0	1	X	X	X	4

===== Draw 5 =====
Friday, September 24, 8:00 pm

Sheet B	1	2	3	4	5	6	7	8	9	10	Final
(Manitoba) Jason Gunnlaugson 🔨	0	2	0	0	1	0	0	0	0	0	3
(Saskatchewan) Matt Dunstone	0	0	1	1	0	0	2	1	1	1	7

Sheet C	1	2	3	4	5	6	7	8	9	10	Final
(Manitoba) Mike McEwen 🔨	0	2	0	1	0	0	4	X	X	X	7
(Ontario) Glenn Howard	0	0	0	0	0	2	0	X	X	X	2

=== Qualifying round ===
==== Qualifying round standings ====
Final qualifying round standings
Note: one game (Flasch vs. Howard) was not played as Dunstone and McEwen had already qualified.

Key
Teams to Trials

Team	W	L	PF	PA	EW	EL	BE	SE
(Manitoba) Mike McEwen	5	1	43	29	25	20	4	8
(Saskatchewan) Matt Dunstone	5	1	42	32	29	21	5	10
(Ontario) Glenn Howard	2	3	24	35	16	20	4	5
(Saskatchewan) Colton Flasch	1	4	24	30	14	19	3	4
(Manitoba) Jason Gunnlaugson	1	5	34	41	23	27	4	5

==== Qualifying round results ====
All draw times are listed in Eastern Time (UTC−04:00).

===== Draw 6 =====
Saturday, September 25, 1:00 pm

Sheet B	1	2	3	4	5	6	7	8	9	10	11	Final
(Saskatchewan) Matt Dunstone 🔨	0	2	0	0	1	0	0	1	1	0	1	6
(Manitoba) Jason Gunnlaugson	0	0	0	1	0	0	3	0	0	1	0	5

Sheet C	1	2	3	4	5	6	7	8	9	10	Final
(Manitoba) Mike McEwen 🔨	1	0	0	2	0	2	1	2	1	X	9
(Saskatchewan) Colton Flasch	0	0	2	0	2	0	0	0	0	X	4

===== Draw 7 =====
Saturday, September 25, 9:00 pm

Sheet B	1	2	3	4	5	6	7	8	9	10	11	Final
(Ontario) Glenn Howard 🔨	0	1	0	2	0	1	0	0	0	2	0	6
(Saskatchewan) Matt Dunstone	1	0	2	0	1	0	0	1	1	0	2	8

Sheet C	1	2	3	4	5	6	7	8	9	10	Final
(Manitoba) Jason Gunnlaugson 🔨	3	0	1	0	0	1	0	2	1	0	8
(Manitoba) Mike McEwen	0	4	0	0	2	0	1	0	0	2	9

===== Draw 8 =====
Sunday, September 26, 10:00 am

Sheet B	1	2	3	4	5	6	7	8	9	10	Final
(Saskatchewan) Colton Flasch											0
(Ontario) Glenn Howard											0

(Not played; unnecessary)

== Women ==
=== Teams ===
The teams are listed as follows:

Skip	Third	Second	Lead	Alternate	Club
Suzanne Birt	Marie Christianson	Meaghan Hughes	Michelle McQuaid		Cornwall CC, Cornwall & Montague CC, Montague, Prince Edward Island
Corryn Brown	Erin Pincott	Dezaray Hawes	Samantha Fisher		Kamloops CC, Kamloops, British Columbia
Kelsey Rocque	Danielle Schmiemann	Dana Ferguson	Rachelle Brown		Saville Community SC, Edmonton, Alberta
Casey Scheidegger	Cary-Anne McTaggart	Jessie Haughian	Kristie Moore		Lethbridge CC, Lethbridge, Alberta
Laura Walker	Kate Cameron	Taylor McDonald	Heather Rogers (Note: Heather Rogers played lead during the tournament, replacing Nadine Scotland who was on maternity leave. Scotland was still listed as the teams alternate on the roster, however.)	Nadine Scotland	Saville Community SC, Edmonton, Alberta

=== Round-robin standings ===
Final round-robin standings

Key
Teams to Trials
Teams to Playoff

Team	W	L	PF	PA	EW	EL	BE	SE
(Alberta) Casey Scheidegger	3	1	29	21	17	14	0	6
(Alberta) Kelsey Rocque	3	1	27	25	18	17	3	1
(Alberta) Laura Walker	2	2	28	25	17	15	3	3
(British Columbia) Corryn Brown	1	3	24	30	14	19	3	2
(Prince Edward Island) Suzanne Birt	1	3	22	29	15	16	1	5

=== Round-robin results ===
All draw times are listed in Eastern Time (UTC−04:00).

==== Draw 1 ====
Thursday, September 23, 4:00 pm

Sheet D	1	2	3	4	5	6	7	8	9	10	Final
(Prince Edward Island) Suzanne Birt	0	1	0	2	0	0	1	0	3	0	7
(British Columbia) Corryn Brown 🔨	2	0	1	0	0	0	0	2	0	4	9

Sheet E	1	2	3	4	5	6	7	8	9	10	Final
(Alberta) Laura Walker 🔨	2	0	0	3	2	0	1	1	X	X	9
(Alberta) Casey Scheidegger	0	2	0	0	0	2	0	0	X	X	4

==== Draw 2 ====
Friday, September 24, 12:00 pm

Sheet D	1	2	3	4	5	6	7	8	9	10	Final
(Alberta) Casey Scheidegger	0	1	0	2	0	1	0	5	1	X	10
(Alberta) Kelsey Rocque 🔨	2	0	1	0	1	0	2	0	0	X	6

Sheet E	1	2	3	4	5	6	7	8	9	10	Final
(British Columbia) Corryn Brown	0	3	0	2	0	1	0	0	0	X	6
(Alberta) Laura Walker 🔨	2	0	3	0	1	0	0	2	1	X	9

==== Draw 3 ====
Friday, September 24, 8:00 pm

Sheet D	1	2	3	4	5	6	7	8	9	10	Final
(Alberta) Kelsey Rocque 🔨	1	0	0	1	0	3	0	1	0	1	7
(Alberta) Laura Walker	0	1	0	0	1	0	1	0	2	0	5

Sheet E	1	2	3	4	5	6	7	8	9	10	Final
(Alberta) Casey Scheidegger 🔨	3	0	0	1	1	3	1	X	X	X	9
(Prince Edward Island) Suzanne Birt	0	1	1	0	0	0	0	X	X	X	2

==== Draw 4 ====
Saturday, September 25, 1:00 pm

Sheet D	1	2	3	4	5	6	7	8	9	10	Final
(British Columbia) Corryn Brown	0	1	1	0	0	0	0	2	0	X	4
(Alberta) Casey Scheidegger 🔨	2	0	0	1	1	1	0	0	1	X	6

Sheet E	1	2	3	4	5	6	7	8	9	10	Final
(Prince Edward Island) Suzanne Birt	0	1	0	2	0	0	0	1	1	0	5
(Alberta) Kelsey Rocque 🔨	2	0	1	0	0	1	0	0	0	2	6

==== Draw 5 ====
Saturday, September 25, 9:00 pm

Sheet D	1	2	3	4	5	6	7	8	9	10	Final
(Alberta) Laura Walker 🔨	2	0	0	2	0	1	0	0	0	X	5
(Prince Edward Island) Suzanne Birt	0	1	1	0	3	0	1	2	0	X	8

Sheet E	1	2	3	4	5	6	7	8	9	10	Final
(Alberta) Kelsey Rocque 🔨	0	2	0	1	0	2	2	0	0	1	8
(British Columbia) Corryn Brown	0	0	1	0	1	0	0	2	1	0	5

=== Playoff ===
- Team Walker had to be beaten twice.

Game 1			Game 2
			1	(Alberta) Laura Walker	8
1	(Alberta) Laura Walker	8	2	(British Columbia) Corryn Brown	4
2	(British Columbia) Corryn Brown	9

==== Game 1 ====
Sunday, September 26, 3:00 pm

Sheet D	1	2	3	4	5	6	7	8	9	10	11	Final
(Alberta) Laura Walker 🔨	0	1	2	0	1	0	0	2	0	2	0	8
(British Columbia) Corryn Brown	1	0	0	3	0	1	0	0	3	0	1	9

==== Game 2 ====
Sunday, September 26, 8:00 pm

Sheet D	1	2	3	4	5	6	7	8	9	10	Final
(Alberta) Laura Walker 🔨	3	0	0	2	0	2	0	0	1	X	8
(British Columbia) Corryn Brown	0	1	0	0	1	0	2	0	0	X	4
