= 2016 WFG Tankard =

- Host city: Salaberry-de-Valleyfield, Quebec
- Arena: Aréna Salaberry
- Dates: January 17–24, 2016
- Winner: Jean-Michel Ménard
- Curling club: CC Etchemin, Saint-Romuald & Mt. Bruno CC, Saint-Bruno-de-Montarville
- Skip: Jean-Michel Ménard
- Third: Martin Crête
- Second: Éric Sylvain
- Lead: Philippe Ménard
- Finalist: Pierre-Luc Morissette

The 2016 Quebec Men's Provincial Curling Championship, also known as the WFG Tankard, was held from January 17 to 24 at the Salaberry Arena in Salaberry-de-Valleyfield, Quebec. The winning Jean-Michel Ménard team represented Quebec at the 2016 Tim Hortons Brier in Ottawa, Ontario. The event was held in conjunction with the 2016 Quebec Scotties Tournament of Hearts.

== Qualification ==
Qualification method	Berths	Qualifying team(s)
Provincial Tour Final	1	Jean-Michel Ménard
Provincial Points	6	Guy Hemmings; Mike Fournier; Pierre-Luc Morissette; Jean-Sébastien Roy; Mathieu Beaufort; Jeffrey Stewart
Host Region	1	Kevin Baker
West Zone	3	William Dion; John Stewart; Marc-André Chartrand
East Zone	3	Steven Munroe; Denis Robichaud; Denis Laflamme

== Teams ==
Teams were as follows:

Skip	Third	Second	Lead	Alternate	Club(s)
Kevin Baker	Simon Hébert	Marco Fortier	François Boissoneault		Valleyfield
Mathieu Beaufort	Jean-Michel Arsenault	Erik Lachance	Maxime H. Benoit		Aurèle-Racine / Glenmore / Etchemin
Marc-André Chartrand	Maxime Dufresne	Sylvain Dicaire	Joel Charbonneau		Rouyn/Amos/Belvédère
William Dion	Félix Asselin	Miguel Bernard	Jason Olsthoorn	François Roberge	Boucherville/Glenmore
Mike Fournier	François Gionest	Yannick Martel	Jean-François Charest		Glenmore / Riverbend / Kénogami
Guy Hemmings	Simon Benoit	Jean-François Trépanier	Martin Trépanier	Pier-Luc Trépanier	Aurèle-Racine / Valleyfield
Denis Laflamme	Michel Lachance	Bernard Gingras	Steve Tremblay	Émilien Skelling	Sept-Iles
Jean-Michel Ménard	Martin Crête	Eric Sylvain	Philippe Ménard		Etchemin / Mont-Bruno
Robert Desjardins (fourth)	Pierre-Luc Morissette (skip)	Thierry Fournier	René Dubois	Maurice Cayouette	Chicoutimi / Victoria / Kénogami
Steven Munroe	Philippe Brassard	Ghyslain Richard	Christian Bouchard		Etchemin/Portneuf/ Sherbrooke/Longue-Pointe
Denis Robichaud	Alexandre Ferland	Jean-David Boulanger	Maxandre Caron	Zack Wise	Sorel/Kénogami/Boucherville
Jean-Sébastien Roy	Jasmin Gibeau	Dan deWaard	Vincent Bourget	Stéphane Paquette	Thurso
Jeffrey Stewart	Ian South	Travis Ackroyd	Lewis South	Tom Wharry	Glenmore
John Stewart	Blake Stoughton	Jules Aumond	François Hallé	Pierre Cuillerier	Valleyfield

== Round robin standings ==
Key
Teams to Championship Round
Teams to Tiebreaker

Pool A	W	L
Ménard	5	1
Je. Stewart	4	2
Morissette	4	2
Dion	4	2
Beaufort	2	4
Laflamme	1	5
Jo. Stewart	1	5

Pool B	W	L
Roy	5	1
Fournier	4	2
Munroe	4	2
Hemmings	3	3
Robichaud	2	4
Chartrand	2	4
Baker	1	5

== Scores ==
=== Draw 1 ===
Sunday, January 17, 15:00

Sheet A	1	2	3	4	5	6	7	8	9	10	Final
Steven Munroe	0	2	0	1	0	4	0	0	0	X	7
Marc-André Chartrand	0	0	1	0	1	0	1	0	0	X	3

Sheet B	1	2	3	4	5	6	7	8	9	10	Final
Mathieu Beaufort	0	0	1	0	0	1	1	1	0	1	5
Denis Laflamme	0	0	0	1	1	0	0	0	2	0	4

Sheet C	1	2	3	4	5	6	7	8	9	10	Final
William Dion	0	0	1	1	1	0	0	0	1	0	4
Jeffrey Stewart	1	0	0	0	0	0	2	1	0	1	5

Sheet D	1	2	3	4	5	6	7	8	9	10	Final
Guy Hemmings	0	1	0	3	1	0	1	0	0	5	11
Kevin Baker	1	0	1	0	0	1	0	1	1	0	5

=== Draw 2 ===
Monday, January 18, 08:15

Sheet A	1	2	3	4	5	6	7	8	9	10	Final
Mathieu Beaufort	0	2	0	0	1	1	0	1	0	0	5
Jeffrey Stewart	0	0	2	0	0	0	1	0	3	1	7

Sheet B	1	2	3	4	5	6	7	8	9	10	Final
Jean-Michel Ménard	3	0	4	0	0	3	X	X	X	X	10
John Stewart	0	0	0	0	1	0	X	X	X	X	1

Sheet C	1	2	3	4	5	6	7	8	9	10	Final
Pierre-Luc Morrisette	0	0	2	0	2	0	3	0	1	X	8
William Dion	0	2	0	1	0	2	0	1	0	X	6

=== Draw 3 ===
Monday, January 18, 12:00

Sheet A	1	2	3	4	5	6	7	8	9	10	Final
Guy Hemmings	1	0	3	0	0	0	0	1	1	0	6
Marc-André Chartrand	0	1	0	2	1	0	0	0	0	1	5

Sheet B	1	2	3	4	5	6	7	8	9	10	Final
Jean-Sébastien Roy	0	2	0	1	0	2	0	1	0	2	8
Steven Munroe	0	0	2	0	2	0	1	0	1	0	6

Sheet C	1	2	3	4	5	6	7	8	9	10	Final
Mike Fournier	0	1	0	1	0	1	2	3	X	X	8
Denis Robichaud	1	0	1	0	1	0	0	0	X	X	3

=== Draw 4 ===
Monday, January 18, 15:45

Sheet A	1	2	3	4	5	6	7	8	9	10	Final
Denis Laflamme	0	2	0	1	0	0	1	0	1	X	5
Jean-Michel Ménard	2	0	3	0	1	0	0	2	0	X	8

Sheet B	1	2	3	4	5	6	7	8	9	10	Final
John Stewart	1	1	0	1	1	1	0	1	1	1	8
Mathieu Beaufort	0	0	2	0	0	0	3	0	0	0	5

Sheet C	1	2	3	4	5	6	7	8	9	10	Final
Jeffrey Stewart	0	0	0	2	0	0	X	X	X	X	2
Pierre-Luc Morrisette	1	1	1	0	3	2	X	X	X	X	8

=== Draw 5 ===
Monday, January 18, 19:30

Sheet A	1	2	3	4	5	6	7	8	9	10	Final
Kevin Baker	0	2	0	0	0	0	1	0	X	X	3
Mike Fournier	2	0	0	2	1	1	0	1	X	X	7

Sheet B	1	2	3	4	5	6	7	8	9	10	Final
Denis Robichaud	2	1	0	0	2	0	1	0	0	2	8
Guy Hemmings	0	0	1	1	0	3	0	2	0	0	7

Sheet C	1	2	3	4	5	6	7	8	9	10	Final
Marc-André Chartrand	0	1	0	1	1	0	1	0	2	X	6
Jean-Sébastien Roy	0	0	2	0	0	1	0	1	0	X	4

=== Draw 6 ===
Tuesday, January 19, 08:15

Sheet A	1	2	3	4	5	6	7	8	9	10	Final
Jean-Sébastien Roy	2	0	2	0	2	2	0	4	X	X	12
Denis Robichaud	0	2	0	1	0	0	1	0	X	X	4

Sheet B	1	2	3	4	5	6	7	8	9	10	11	Final
Steven Munroe	0	0	1	0	0	2	0	0	3	2	1	9
Guy Hemmings	0	1	0	3	1	0	1	2	0	0	0	8

Sheet C	1	2	3	4	5	6	7	8	9	10	Final
Marc-André Chartrand	0	0	2	0	0	1	0	0	0	X	3
Mike Fournier	0	1	0	3	0	0	1	1	1	X	7

=== Draw 7 ===
Tuesday, January 19, 12:00

Sheet A	1	2	3	4	5	6	7	8	9	10	Final
Pierre-Luc Morrisette	2	0	1	0	0	1	1	0	0	1	6
John Stewart	0	3	0	1	0	0	0	1	0	0	5

Sheet B	1	2	3	4	5	6	7	8	9	10	Final
Jeffrey Stewart	2	1	0	2	0	0	1	0	0	X	6
Jean-Michel Ménard	0	0	3	0	2	1	0	3	2	X	11

Sheet C	1	2	3	4	5	6	7	8	9	10	Final
William Dion	0	1	0	1	1	2	0	2	0	1	8
Mathieu Beaufort	0	0	2	0	0	0	2	0	2	0	6

=== Draw 8 ===
Tuesday, January 19, 15:45

Sheet A	1	2	3	4	5	6	7	8	9	10	Final
Jean-Sebastien Roy	0	3	0	0	0	3	1	0	4	X	11
Mike Fournier	1	0	1	0	1	0	0	1	0	X	4

Sheet B	1	2	3	4	5	6	7	8	9	10	Final
Marc-André Chartrand	0	1	0	1	1	0	0	1	0	0	4
Denis Robichaud	0	0	0	0	0	2	1	0	1	1	5

Sheet C	1	2	3	4	5	6	7	8	9	10	Final
Steven Munroe	1	0	0	2	0	0	2	0	0	2	7
Kevin Baker	0	2	0	0	0	2	0	1	0	0	5

=== Draw 9 ===
Tuesday, January 19, 19:30

Sheet A	1	2	3	4	5	6	7	8	9	10	11	Final
Jefrey Stewart	2	0	3	0	1	2	0	0	1	0	1	10
John Stewart	0	2	0	1	0	0	2	1	0	3	0	9

Sheet B	1	2	3	4	5	6	7	8	9	10	Final
Pierre-Luc Morrissette	1	0	0	0	1	0	X	X	X	X	2
Jean-Michel Ménard	0	1	2	3	0	3	X	X	X	X	9

Sheet C	1	2	3	4	5	6	7	8	9	10	Final
William Dion	1	3	0	2	2	0	0	0	1	X	9
Denis Laflamme	0	0	2	0	0	0	2	1	0	X	5

=== Draw 10 ===
Wednesday, January 20, 08:15

Sheet A	1	2	3	4	5	6	7	8	9	10	Final
Jean-Michel Ménard	0	1	0	0	3	0	1	0	1	0	6
William Dion	3	0	1	1	0	0	0	1	0	1	7

Sheet B	1	2	3	4	5	6	7	8	9	10	Final
Denis Laflamme	1	0	0	2	0	0	0	0	X	X	3
Jeffrey Stewart	0	0	3	0	0	2	1	2	X	X	8

Sheet C	1	2	3	4	5	6	7	8	9	10	Final
Mathieu Beaufort	4	0	0	0	0	0	0	0	0	1	5
Pierre-Luc Morrisette	0	0	0	0	1	0	0	1	1	0	3

=== Draw 11 ===
Wednesday, January 20, 12:00

Sheet A	1	2	3	4	5	6	7	8	9	10	Final
Kevin Baker	1	0	0	0	0	1	0	0	2	0	4
Marc-André Chartrand	0	1	1	0	1	0	2	0	0	1	6

Sheet B	1	2	3	4	5	6	7	8	9	10	Final
Guy Hemmings	0	0	1	1	0	0	0	3	0	0	5
Jean-Sébastien Roy	1	1	0	0	1	0	0	0	2	2	7

Sheet C	1	2	3	4	5	6	7	8	9	10	Final
Mike Fournier	3	0	0	2	1	0	1	2	X	X	9
Steven Munroe	0	0	2	0	0	1	0	0	X	X	3

=== Draw 12 ===
Wednesday, January 20, 15:45

Sheet A	1	2	3	4	5	6	7	8	9	10	Final
Denis Laflamme	0	1	0	0	0	X	X	X	X	X	1
Pierre-Luc Morrisette	3	0	2	1	1	X	X	X	X	X	7

Sheet B	1	2	3	4	5	6	7	8	9	10	Final
John Stewart	0	0	2	0	1	0	X	X	X	X	3
William Dion	2	2	0	2	0	3	X	X	X	X	9

Sheet C	1	2	3	4	5	6	7	8	9	10	Final
Jean-Michel Ménard	3	1	0	1	2	X	X	X	X	X	7
Mathieu Beaufort	0	0	1	0	0	X	X	X	X	X	1

=== Draw 13 ===
Wednesday, January 20, 19:30

Sheet A	1	2	3	4	5	6	7	8	9	10	Final
Mike Fournier	2	0	0	0	3	0	0	0	0	X	5
Guy Hemmings	0	1	1	1	0	3	1	1	1	X	9

Sheet B	1	2	3	4	5	6	7	8	9	10	Final
Kevin Baker	0	0	2	1	0	0	2	0	X	X	5
Jean-Sébastien Roy	1	1	0	0	3	2	0	3	X	X	10

Sheet C	1	2	3	4	5	6	7	8	9	10	Final
Denis Robichaud	0	2	0	1	0	0	1	0	2	X	6
Steven Munroe	2	0	2	0	1	1	0	3	0	X	9

=== Draw 14 ===
Thursday, January 21, 09:00

Sheet A	1	2	3	4	5	6	7	8	9	10	Final
Denis Robichaud	0	0	1	0	1	X	X	X	X	X	2
Kevin Baker	2	5	0	2	0	X	X	X	X	X	9

Sheet B	1	2	3	4	5	6	7	8	9	10	Final
John Stewart	0	1	0	1	0	1	1	0	0	X	4
Denis Laflamme	0	0	3	0	2	0	0	1	3	X	9

== Tiebreaker ==
=== Draw 15 ===
Thursday, January 21, 14:00

Sheet A	1	2	3	4	5	6	7	8	Final
William Dion	0	1	0	0	0	1	0	X	2
Pierre-Luc Morrissette	0	0	1	2	0	0	1	X	4

== Championship round ==
Key
Teams to Playoffs

Skip	W	L
Roy	7	2
Ménard	7	2
Morissette	7	2
Je. Stewart	5	4
Munroe	5	4
Fournier	4	5

=== Draw 16 ===
Thursday, January 21, 19:30

Sheet A	1	2	3	4	5	6	7	8	9	10	Final
Jean-Michel Ménard	2	0	1	0	1	0	0	1	3	X	8
Steven Munroe	0	1	0	1	0	0	1	0	0	X	3

Sheet B	1	2	3	4	5	6	7	8	9	10	Final
Pierre-Luc Morrissette	3	0	0	2	0	0	1	0	1	X	7
Jean-Sébastien Roy	0	1	0	0	1	1	0	1	0	X	4

Sheet C	1	2	3	4	5	6	7	8	9	10	Final
Jeffrey Stewart	0	2	1	1	2	0	0	1	0	X	7
Mike Fournier	1	0	0	0	0	1	1	0	2	X	5

=== Draw 17 ===
Friday, January 22, 10:00

Sheet A	1	2	3	4	5	6	7	8	9	10	Final
Jeffrey Stewart	0	3	0	2	3	0	0	1	0	X	9
Jean-Sébastien Roy	3	0	1	0	0	2	4	0	3	X	13

Sheet B	1	2	3	4	5	6	7	8	9	10	Final
Jean-Michel Ménard	1	0	1	0	0	1	0	1	1	X	5
Mike Fournier	0	1	0	1	0	0	1	0	0	X	3

Sheet C	1	2	3	4	5	6	7	8	9	10	Final
Pierre-Luc Morrissette	0	1	0	3	0	0	1	0	0	1	6
Steven Munroe	0	0	2	0	0	1	0	0	2	0	5

=== Draw 18 ===
Friday, January 22, 10:00

Sheet A	1	2	3	4	5	6	7	8	9	10	11	Final
Pierre-Luc Morrisette	0	1	0	1	0	2	0	1	0	2	4	11
Mike Fournier	1	0	2	0	1	0	2	0	1	0	0	7

Sheet B	1	2	3	4	5	6	7	8	9	10	11	Final
Jeffrey Stewart	3	0	0	4	0	0	1	0	0	0	0	8
Steven Munroe	0	1	2	0	1	1	0	1	1	1	1	9

Sheet C	1	2	3	4	5	6	7	8	9	10	Final
Jean-Michel Ménard	1	0	1	0	1	0	0	1	1	0	5
Jean-Sébastien Roy	0	1	0	2	0	2	0	0	0	2	7

== Tiebreaker ==
=== Draw 19 ===
Saturday, January 23, 10:00

Sheet A	1	2	3	4	5	6	7	8	Final
Steven Munroe	1	0	1	1	0	0	0	0	3
Jeffrey Stewart	0	2	0	0	1	0	0	1	4

== Playoffs ==
Page playoff system
1	Jean-Sébastien Roy	10
2	Jean-Michel Ménard	12
3	Pierre-Luc Morissette	7
4	Jeffrey Stewart	6

Semifinal
1	Jean-Sébastien Roy	6
3	Pierre-Luc Morissette	10

Final
2	Jean-Michel Ménard	6
3	Pierre-Luc Morissette	4

=== 1 vs 2 ===
Saturday, January 23, 14:30

Sheet A	1	2	3	4	5	6	7	8	9	10	11	Final
Jean-Sébastien Roy	0	1	0	3	0	2	0	2	0	2	0	10
Jean-Michel Ménard	2	0	1	0	4	0	2	0	1	0	2	12

=== 3 vs 4 ===
Saturday, January 23, 14:30

Sheet A	1	2	3	4	5	6	7	8	9	10	Final
Pierre-Luc Morrisette	1	0	2	0	1	0	1	1	0	1	7
Jeffrey Stewart	0	2	0	1	0	1	0	0	2	0	6

=== Semifinal ===
Sunday, January 24, 08:15

Team	1	2	3	4	5	6	7	8	9	10	Final
Jean-Sébastien Roy	2	0	1	0	0	0	2	1	0	X	6
Pierre-Luc Morissette	0	3	0	3	3	0	0	0	1	X	10

=== Final ===
Sunday, January 24, 15:45

Team	1	2	3	4	5	6	7	8	9	10	Final
Jean-Michel Ménard	0	1	0	2	1	0	1	0	1	X	6
Pierre-Luc Morissette	0	0	1	0	0	1	0	2	0	X	4

2016 WFG Tankard

Jean-Michel Ménard
10th Quebec Provincial Championship title
