= 2015 Quebec Men's Provincial Curling Championship =

2015 Quebec Provincial Tankard
- Host city: Victoriaville, Quebec
- Arena: Complexe Sportif Sani Marc
- Dates: January 12–18, 2015
- Winner: Jean-Michel Ménard
- Curling club: CC Etchemin, Saint-Romuald
- Skip: Jean-Michel Ménard
- Third: Martin Crête
- Second: Éric Sylvain
- Lead: Philippe Ménard
- Finalist: Mike Fournier

The 2015 Quebec Men's Provincial Curling Championship, also known as the Quebec Tankard, was held from January 12 to 18 at the Complexe Sportif Sani Marc in Victoriaville, Quebec. The winning team represented Quebec at the 2015 Tim Hortons Brier in Calgary, Alberta. The event was held in conjunction with the 2015 Quebec Scotties Tournament of Hearts.

== Qualification ==
Qualification method	Berths	Qualifying team(s)
Provincial Points	3	Jean-Michel Ménard; Mike Fournier; Robert Desjardins
Provincial Tour Final	1	Steven Munroe
West Zone	3	Simon Benoit; Maxime Dufresne; Steeve Gagnon
East Zone	3	Ghyslain Richard; Martin Ferland; Denis Laflamme

== Teams ==
Skip	Third	Second	Lead	Alternate	Club(s)
Simon Benoit	Jean-François Trépanier	Martin Trépanier	Pier-Luc Trépanier	Francois Hallé	Aurèle-Racine/Valleyfield
Robert Desjardins	Louis Biron	Frederic Lawton	Maurice Cayouette	Simon Dupuis	Chicoutimi/Thurso/Baie d'Urfe/Glenmore
Maxime Dufresne	Marc-André Chartrand	Gabriel Saindon	Joel Charbonneau		Amos/La Sarre/Noranda/Belvédère
Martin Ferland	Philippe Lemay	Mathieu Beaufort	Erik Lachance	Jean-Michel Arsenault	Laviolette
Mike Fournier	François Gionest	Yannick Martel	Jean-François Charest	René Dubois	Glenmore/Kenogami/Riverbend
Steeve Gagnon	Martin Roy	Mike Coolidge	Olivier Beaulieu		
Denis Laflamme	Bernard Gingras	Steve Tremblay	Alain Lapierre		Sept-Iles
Jean-Michel Ménard	Martin Crête	Eric Sylvain	Philippe Ménard		Club de curling Etchemin, Saint-Romuald
Steven Munroe	Philippe Brossard	Christian Bouchard	Thierry Fournier		Etchemin/Portneuf/Longue-Pointe
Ghyslain Richard	Maxime Elmaleh	William Dion	Miguel Bernard	Simon Collin	Sherbrooke/Etchemin/Drummondville/TMR

== Standings ==
Key
Teams to Playoffs

Skip	W	L
Ménard	9	0
Ferland	8	1
Fournier	6	3
Munroe	5	4
Richard	4	5
Benoit	3	6
Desjardins	3	6
Dufresne	3	6
Gagnon	2	7
Laflamme	2	7

== Round robin results ==
=== Draw 1 ===
Monday, January 12, 20:00

Sheet A	1	2	3	4	5	6	7	8	9	10	Final
Steven Munroe	0	1	0	0	1	0	0	0	X	X	2
Jean-Michel Ménard	2	0	1	1	0	1	0	2	X	X	7

Sheet B	1	2	3	4	5	6	7	8	9	10	Final
Denis Laflamme	1	0	1	4	0	0	0	2	0	X	8
Robert Desjardins	0	0	0	0	2	3	0	0	1	X	6

Sheet C	1	2	3	4	5	6	7	8	9	10	Final
Mike Fournier	2	0	0	1	0	1	1	1	0	1	7
Simon Benoit	0	0	2	0	2	0	0	0	1	0	5

Sheet D	1	2	3	4	5	6	7	8	9	10	Final
Martin Ferland	0	0	1	1	0	2	0	1	1	X	6
Maxime Dufresne	0	1	0	0	1	0	2	0	0	X	4

Sheet E	1	2	3	4	5	6	7	8	9	10	Final
Steeve Gagnon	0	1	2	0	2	0	2	0	0	0	7
Ghyslain Richard	1	0	0	1	0	1	0	1	2	2	8

=== Draw 2 ===
Tuesday, January 13, 12:00

Sheet A	1	2	3	4	5	6	7	8	9	10	Final
Ghyslain Richard	0	0	1	1	1	1	2	0	1	X	7
Simon Benoit	1	0	0	0	0	0	0	1	0	X	2

Sheet B	1	2	3	4	5	6	7	8	9	10	Final
Steeve Gagnon	1	0	1	0	1	0	0	0	X	X	3
Jean-Michel Ménard	0	1	0	3	0	1	2	1	X	X	8

Sheet C	1	2	3	4	5	6	7	8	9	10	Final
Steven Munroe	0	0	3	0	1	1	2	0	1	X	8
Maxime Dufresne	2	1	0	0	0	0	0	2	0	X	5

Sheet D	1	2	3	4	5	6	7	8	9	10	Final
Mike Fournier	1	0	3	1	0	0	2	X	X	X	7
Denis Laflamme	0	0	0	0	2	0	0	X	X	X	2

Sheet E	1	2	3	4	5	6	7	8	9	10	Final
Martin Ferland	0	0	3	1	0	2	1	1	X	X	8
Robert Desjardins	1	0	0	0	1	0	0	0	X	X	2

=== Draw 3 ===
Tuesday, January 13, 19:30

Sheet A	1	2	3	4	5	6	7	8	9	10	Final
Jean-Michel Ménard	2	0	3	3	0	X	X	X	X	X	8
Maxime Dufresne	0	0	0	0	1	X	X	X	X	X	1

Sheet B	1	2	3	4	5	6	7	8	9	10	Final
Martin Ferland	2	0	2	0	0	0	0	1	0	4	9
Denis Laflamme	0	1	0	0	2	1	0	0	2	0	6

Sheet C	1	2	3	4	5	6	7	8	9	10	11	Final
Simon Benoit	0	0	1	2	0	0	1	0	0	1	1	6
Steven Munroe	2	0	0	0	2	0	0	1	0	0	0	5

Sheet D	1	2	3	4	5	6	7	8	9	10	Final
Robert Desjardins	0	1	3	1	1	0	0	X	X	X	6
Ghyslain Richard	0	0	0	0	0	0	1	X	X	X	1

Sheet E	1	2	3	4	5	6	7	8	9	10	Final
Mike Fournier	0	0	1	0	0	2	3	3	X	X	9
Steeve Gagnon	0	0	0	1	0	0	0	0	X	X	1

=== Draw 4 ===
Wednesday, January 14, 12:00

Sheet A	1	2	3	4	5	6	7	8	9	10	Final
Mike Fournier	2	0	1	2	1	0	1	0	1	X	8
Robert Desjardins	0	2	0	0	0	1	0	1	0	X	4

Sheet B	1	2	3	4	5	6	7	8	9	10	Final
Ghyslain Richard	0	2	0	0	0	1	0	2	1	X	6
Steven Munroe	2	0	2	2	2	0	1	0	0	X	9

Sheet C	1	2	3	4	5	6	7	8	9	10	Final
Denis Laflamme	0	2	0	1	0	1	0	0	1	X	5
Jean-Michel Ménard	3	0	1	0	3	0	0	1	0	X	8

Sheet D	1	2	3	4	5	6	7	8	9	10	Final
Maxime Dufresne	1	0	0	4	3	X	X	X	X	X	8
Steeve Gagnon	0	0	1	0	0	X	X	X	X	X	1

Sheet E	1	2	3	4	5	6	7	8	9	10	Final
Simon Benoit	0	1	1	0	0	0	1	0	X	X	3
Martin Ferland	0	0	0	2	1	2	0	3	X	X	8

=== Draw 5 ===
Wednesday, January 14, 19:30

Sheet A	1	2	3	4	5	6	7	8	9	10	Final
Steeve Gagnon	1	0	0	1	1	0	1	X	X	X	4
Martin Ferland	0	2	1	0	0	5	0	X	X	X	8

Sheet B	1	2	3	4	5	6	7	8	9	10	Final
Simon Benoit	2	0	3	0	1	0	2	0	3	X	11
Maxime Dufresne	0	2	0	2	0	1	0	1	0	X	6

Sheet C	1	2	3	4	5	6	7	8	9	10	Final
Ghyslain Richard	2	0	2	0	0	2	2	0	0	0	8
Denis Laflamme	0	1	0	0	3	0	0	2	0	1	7

Sheet D	1	2	3	4	5	6	7	8	9	10	Final
Jean-Michel Ménard	2	2	0	0	2	0	0	2	X	X	8
Robert Desjardins	0	0	2	0	0	1	0	0	X	X	3

Sheet E	1	2	3	4	5	6	7	8	9	10	Final
Steven Munroe	0	2	0	3	0	1	2	0	0	X	8
Mike Fournier	1	0	1	0	2	0	0	1	1	X	6

=== Draw 6 ===
Thursday, January 15, 8:15

Sheet A	1	2	3	4	5	6	7	8	9	10	Final
Simon Benoit	0	0	1	1	1	1	2	0	2	X	8
Denis Laflamme	2	0	0	0	0	0	0	2	0	X	4

Sheet B	1	2	3	4	5	6	7	8	9	10	Final
Steven Munroe	1	0	3	2	0	2	0	X	X	X	8
Steeve Gagnon	0	1	0	0	2	0	1	X	X	X	4

Sheet C	1	2	3	4	5	6	7	8	9	10	Final
Jean-Michel Ménard	0	4	0	2	2	X	X	X	X	X	8
Martin Ferland	1	0	2	0	0	X	X	X	X	X	3

Sheet D	1	2	3	4	5	6	7	8	9	10	Final
Ghyslain Richard	0	0	2	0	0	1	0	X	X	X	3
Mike Fournier	1	1	0	2	3	0	2	X	X	X	9

Sheet E	1	2	3	4	5	6	7	8	9	10	Final
Robert Desjardins	0	1	1	0	1	0	1	0	2	0	6
Maxime Dufresne	1	0	0	1	0	2	0	2	0	3	9

=== Draw 7 ===
Thursday, January 15, 15:45

Sheet A	1	2	3	4	5	6	7	8	9	10	Final
Maxime Dufresne	0	0	1	0	3	0	1	0	0	X	5
Ghyslain Richard	0	1	0	2	0	2	0	2	1	X	8

Sheet B	1	2	3	4	5	6	7	8	9	10	Final
Mike Fournier	0	1	0	0	0	X	X	X	X	X	1
Martin Ferland	2	0	1	1	4	X	X	X	X	X	8

Sheet C	1	2	3	4	5	6	7	8	9	10	Final
Steeve Gagnon	0	2	0	1	0	2	0	2	0	0	7
Robert Desjardins	2	0	1	0	3	0	2	0	1	1	10

Sheet D	1	2	3	4	5	6	7	8	9	10	Final
Simon Benoit	0	0	0	0	1	0	0	0	1	0	2
Jean-Michel Ménard	2	0	0	0	0	0	2	0	0	1	5

Sheet E	1	2	3	4	5	6	7	8	9	10	Final
Denis Laflamme	1	0	4	0	1	0	0	2	0	X	8
Steven Munroe	0	1	0	1	0	0	2	0	0	X	4

=== Draw 8 ===
Friday, January 16, 8:15

Sheet A	1	2	3	4	5	6	7	8	9	10	Final
Denis Laflamme	0	1	1	1	0	0	2	0	0	X	5
Steeve Gagnon	0	0	0	0	2	1	0	2	2	X	7

Sheet B	1	2	3	4	5	6	7	8	9	10	Final
Robert Desjardins	0	1	0	0	2	1	2	1	2	X	9
Simon Benoit	1	0	1	1	0	0	0	0	0	X	3

Sheet C	1	2	3	4	5	6	7	8	9	10	Final
Maxime Dufresne	1	1	0	0	1	0	X	X	X	X	3
Mike Fournier	0	0	3	3	0	3	X	X	X	X	9

Sheet D	1	2	3	4	5	6	7	8	9	10	Final
Steven Munroe	0	1	0	0	2	0	0	X	X	X	3
Martin Ferland	2	0	3	2	0	0	2	X	X	X	9

Sheet E	1	2	3	4	5	6	7	8	9	10	Final
Ghyslain Richard	2	0	2	0	3	0	0	0	0	0	7
Jean-Michel Ménard	0	2	0	1	0	0	0	2	3	2	10

=== Draw 9 ===
Friday, January 16, 15:45

Sheet A	1	2	3	4	5	6	7	8	9	10	Final
Robert Desjardins	0	2	0	1	0	X	X	X	X	X	3
Steven Munroe	3	0	2	0	3	X	X	X	X	X	8

Sheet B	1	2	3	4	5	6	7	8	9	10	Final
Jean-Michel Ménard	0	2	0	2	0	3	X	X	X	X	7
Mike Fournier	0	0	1	0	1	0	X	X	X	X	2

Sheet C	1	2	3	4	5	6	7	8	9	10	Final
Martin Ferland	0	3	0	2	0	0	0	0	3	0	8
Ghyslain Richard	1	0	2	0	0	0	2	0	0	2	7

Sheet D	1	2	3	4	5	6	7	8	9	10	Final
Steeve Gagnon	0	0	0	0	0	3	1	1	0	3	8
Simon Benoit	2	0	1	0	1	0	0	0	2	0	6

Sheet E	1	2	3	4	5	6	7	8	9	10	Final
Maxime Dufresne	1	0	1	1	0	0	0	1	1	X	5
Denis Laflamme	0	1	0	0	0	0	1	0	0	X	2

== Playoffs ==
Page playoff system
1	Jean-Michel Ménard	9
2	Martin Ferland	4
3	Mike Fournier	10
4	Steven Munroe	6

Semifinal
2	Martin Ferland	5
3	Mike Fournier	8

Final
1	Jean-Michel Ménard	7
3	Mike Fournier	2

=== 1 vs. 2 ===
Saturday, January 17, 12:00

Sheet B	1	2	3	4	5	6	7	8	9	10	Final
Jean-Michel Ménard	2	0	0	3	0	4	X	X	X	X	9
Martin Ferland	0	2	1	0	1	0	X	X	X	X	4

=== 3 vs. 4 ===
Saturday, January 17, 12:00

Sheet D	1	2	3	4	5	6	7	8	9	10	Final
Steven Munroe	0	1	1	0	1	0	3	0	0	0	6
Mike Fournier	2	0	0	1	0	1	0	2	1	3	10

=== Semifinal ===
Sunday, January 17, 19:30

Sheet C	1	2	3	4	5	6	7	8	9	10	Final
Mike Fournier	0	0	2	0	1	0	2	2	0	1	8
Martin Ferland	1	0	0	2	0	1	0	0	1	0	5

=== Final ===
Sunday, January 18, 14:30

Sheet C	1	2	3	4	5	6	7	8	9	10	Final
Jean-Michel Ménard	1	1	0	2	0	0	2	1	X	X	7
Mike Fournier	0	0	1	0	0	1	0	0	X	X	2

2015 Quebec Men's Provincial Curling Championship

Jean-Michel Ménard
9th Quebec Provincial Championship title
