= 2015 Quebec Scotties Tournament of Hearts =

- Host city: Victoriaville, Quebec
- Arena: Complexe Sportif Sani Marc
- Dates: January 12–18
- Winner: Lauren Mann
- Curling club: Glenmore CC, Dollard-des-Ormeaux; CC Etchemin, Saint-Romuald
- Skip: Lauren Mann
- Third: Amélie Blais
- Second: Brittany O'Rourke
- Lead: Anne-Marie Filteau
- Finalist: Roxane Perron

The 2015 Quebec Scotties Tournament of Hearts, the provincial women's curling championship of Quebec, were held from January 12 to 18 at Complexe Sportif Sani Marc in Victoriaville, Quebec. The Lauren Mann rink from Montreal won the event and represented Quebec at the 2015 Scotties Tournament of Hearts. The event was held in conjunction with the 2015 Quebec Men's Provincial Curling Championship.

== Teams ==
The teams are listed as follows:

Skip	Third	Second	Lead	Alternate	Club(s)
Lisa Davies	Alanna Routledge	Alison Davies	Joëlle St-Hillaire	Marie-Pier Côté	Glenmore CC, Dollard-des-Ormeaux
Nathalie Gagnon	Lana Gosselin	Nathalie Gagné	Ann-Sophie Guérin		CC Riverbend, Alma; CC Etchemin, Saint-Romuald
Lauren Mann	Amélie Blais	Brittany O'Rourke	Anne-Marie Filteau		Glenmore CC, Dollard-des-Ormeaux; CC Etchemin, Saint-Romuald
Kimberly Mastine	Nathalie Audet	Audrée Dufresne	Saskia Hollands		Club de curling Sherbrooke, Sherbrooke; Club de curling Boucherville, Boucherville; Glenmore CC, Dollard-des-Ormeaux
Hélène Pelchat	Chantal Gadoua	Kathleen Boyer	Marie-Claude Comeau		CC Valleyfield, Salaberry-de-Valleyfield; Glenmore CC, Dollard-des-Ormeaux
Roxane Perron	Marie-Josée Fortier	Miriam Perron	Sonia Delisle		Club de curling Laviolette, Trois-Rivières

== Round robin standings ==
Final Round Robin Standings

Key
Teams to Playoffs
Teams to Tiebreaker

Skip	W	L
Lauren Mann (Glenmore/Etchemin)	8	2
Roxane Perron (Laviolette)	6	4
Kimberly Mastine (Sherbrooke/Boucherville/Glenmore)	6	4
Nathalie Gagnon (Riverbend/Etchemin)	6	4
Lisa Davies (Glenmore)	3	7
Hélène Pelchat (Valleyfield/Glenmore)	1	9

== Round robin results ==
=== Draw 1 ===
Monday, January 12, 8:15 am

Sheet B	1	2	3	4	5	6	7	8	9	10	11	Final
Roxane Perron	0	1	0	1	1	1	1	0	0	2	1	8
Kimberly Mastine	2	0	3	0	0	0	0	1	1	0	0	7

Sheet C	1	2	3	4	5	6	7	8	9	10	Final
Lauren Mann	4	0	3	0	1	0	X	X	X	X	8
Hélène Pelchat	0	1	0	0	0	1	X	X	X	X	2

Sheet D	1	2	3	4	5	6	7	8	9	10	Final
Nathalie Gagnon	2	0	1	0	0	2	1	0	1	X	7
Lisa Davies	0	1	0	0	3	0	0	1	0	X	5

=== Draw 2 ===
Monday, January 12, 3:30 pm

Team	1	2	3	4	5	6	7	8	9	10	Final
Lauren Mann	1	0	0	0	0	0	3	1	1	0	6
Nathalie Gagnon	0	0	0	0	1	1	0	0	0	3	5

Team	1	2	3	4	5	6	7	8	9	10	Final
Kimberly Mastine	2	1	3	1	0	1	0	0	1	X	4
Lisa Davies	0	0	0	0	1	0	1	2	0	X	9

Team	1	2	3	4	5	6	7	8	9	10	Final
Roxane Perron	1	0	2	1	0	1	0	2	0	X	7
Hélène Pelchat	0	2	0	0	1	0	0	0	01		4

=== Draw 3 ===
Tuesday, January 13, 8:15 am

Sheet B	1	2	3	4	5	6	7	8	9	10	11	Final
Nathalie Gagnon	0	0	0	2	1	0	0	2	0	0	3	8
Roxane Perron	2	0	0	0	0	1	0	0	1	1	0	5

Sheet C	1	2	3	4	5	6	7	8	9	10	Final
Hélène Pelchat	0	1	0	1	0	1	0	0	0	0	3
Kimberly Mastine	0	0	1	0	1	0	1	1	0	3	7

Sheet D	1	2	3	4	5	6	7	8	9	10	Final
Lauren Mann	0	2	0	0	3	0	1	1	0	3	10
Lisa Davies	0	0	3	1	0	1	0	0	1	0	6

=== Draw 4 ===
Tuesday, January 13, 3:45 pm

Sheet B	1	2	3	4	5	6	7	8	9	10	Final
Kimberly Mastine	1	0	0	0	3	0	1	1	0	0	6
Lauren Mann	0	2	1	0	0	3	0	0	3	1	10

Sheet C	1	2	3	4	5	6	7	8	9	10	Final
Lisa Davies	0	2	2	0	1	2	0	3	X	X	10
Roxane Perron	0	0	0	1	0	0	1	0	X	X	2

Sheet D	1	2	3	4	5	6	7	8	9	10	Final
Hélène Pelchat	0	2	0	1	0	1	1	0	1	0	6
Nathalie Gagnon	2	0	2	0	1	0	0	2	0	1	8

=== Draw 5 ===
Wednesday, January 14, 8:15 am

Sheet B	1	2	3	4	5	6	7	8	9	10	Final
Hélène Pelchat	0	1	0	3	0	1	0	4	1	X	10
Lisa Davies	1	0	2	0	0	0	1	0	0	X	4

Sheet C	1	2	3	4	5	6	7	8	9	10	Final
Roxane Perron	0	0	1	1	0	1	0	2	0	1	6
Lauren Mann	0	2	0	0	1	0	1	0	1	0	5

Sheet D	1	2	3	4	5	6	7	8	9	10	Final
Nathalie Gagnon	1	0	0	1	0	0	0	0	0	X	2
Kimberly Mastine	0	0	2	0	3	0	1	1	2	X	9

=== Draw 6 ===
Wednesday, January 14, 3:45 pm

Sheet B	1	2	3	4	5	6	7	8	9	10	Final
Kimberly Mastine	0	0	1	0	2	1	0	1	0	0	5
Roxane Perron	1	2	0	1	0	0	1	0	1	2	8

Sheet C	1	2	3	4	5	6	7	8	9	10	Final
Lisa Davies	0	1	0	0	1	1	0	2	0	X	5
Nathalie Gagnon	0	0	1	2	0	0	2	0	2	X	7

Sheet D	1	2	3	4	5	6	7	8	9	10	Final
Hélène Pelchat	0	1	0	0	0	2	0	3	1	0	7
Lauren Mann	2	0	0	2	1	0	2	0	0	3	10

=== Draw 7 ===
Thursday, January 15, 12:00 pm

Sheet B	1	2	3	4	5	6	7	8	9	10	Final
Nathalie Gagnon	0	0	0	0	1	0	0	1	0	X	2
Lauren Mann	2	0	0	0	0	2	1	0	3	X	8

Sheet C	1	2	3	4	5	6	7	8	9	10	Final
Hélène Pelchat	1	0	0	0	1	0	2	0	X	X	4
Roxane Perron	0	2	1	2	0	2	0	4	X	X	11

Sheet D	1	2	3	4	5	6	7	8	9	10	11	Final
Lisa Davies	0	0	2	0	2	0	0	0	1	1	0	6
Kimberly Mastine	0	2	0	1	0	2	1	0	0	0	1	7

=== Draw 8 ===
Thursday, January 15, 7:30 pm

Sheet B	1	2	3	4	5	6	7	8	9	10	Final
Lisa Davies	0	1	1	0	1	0	0	4	0	X	7
Hélène Pelchat	1	0	0	0	0	1	1	0	1	X	4

Sheet C	1	2	3	4	5	6	7	8	9	10	Final
Kimberly Mastine	0	0	1	0	0	0	0	2	1	2	6
Nathalie Gagnon	1	0	0	0	1	0	0	0	0	0	2

Sheet D	1	2	3	4	5	6	7	8	9	10	Final
Lauren Mann	1	1	0	1	0	0	0	0	0	1	4
Roxane Perron	0	0	1	0	0	0	0	1	1	0	3

=== Draw 9 ===
Friday, January 16, 12:00 pm

Sheet B	1	2	3	4	5	6	7	8	9	10	Final
Roxane Perron	2	0	0	0	1	0	1	0	1	0	5
Nathalie Gagnon	0	2	1	0	0	2	0	1	0	1	7

Sheet C	1	2	3	4	5	6	7	8	9	10	Final
Lauren Mann	1	0	0	1	1	1	0	1	0	X	5
Lisa Davies	0	0	0	0	0	0	1	0	1	X	2

Sheet D	1	2	3	4	5	6	7	8	9	10	Final
Kimberly Mastine	0	1	0	2	3	0	2	0	0	1	9
Hélène Pelchat	1	0	1	0	0	1	0	1	1	0	5

=== Draw 10 ===
Friday, January 16, 7:30 pm

Sheet B	1	2	3	4	5	6	7	8	9	10	Final
Lauren Mann	0	2	0	1	0	1	0	0	1	1	6
Kimberly Mastine	0	0	1	0	2	0	2	2	0	0	7

Sheet C	1	2	3	4	5	6	7	8	9	10	Final
Nathalie Gagnon	2	0	0	3	1	0	0	3	X	X	9
Hélène Pelchat	0	0	1	0	0	2	0	0	X	X	3

Sheet D	1	2	3	4	5	6	7	8	9	10	Final
Roxane Perron	1	1	0	2	0	3	2	X	X	X	9
Lisa Davies	0	0	2	0	1	0	0	X	X	X	3

== Tiebreaker ==
Saturday, January 17, 8:15 am

Sheet C	1	2	3	4	5	6	7	8	9	10	Final
Kimberley Mastine	0	0	1	0	0	5	0	X	X	X	6
Nathalie Gagnon	0	1	0	1	0	0	1	X	X	X	3

== Playoffs ==
Semifinal			Final
			1	Lauren Mann	10
2	Roxane Perron	11	2	Roxane Perron	6
3	Kimberly Mastine	4

=== Semifinal ===
Saturday, January 17, 3:45 pm

Sheet C	1	2	3	4	5	6	7	8	9	10	Final
Roxane Perron	2	0	0	1	0	2	0	1	5	X	11
Kimberley Mastine	0	1	0	0	1	0	2	0	0	X	4

=== Final ===
Sunday, January 18, 9:30 am

Sheet C	1	2	3	4	5	6	7	8	9	10	Final
Lauren Mann	2	0	0	1	0	1	3	0	3	X	10
Roxane Perron	0	2	0	0	2	0	0	2	0	X	6

2015 Quebec Scotties Tournament of Hearts

Lauren Mann
1st Quebec Provincial Championship title
