= 2021 Canadian Curling Pre-Trials Direct-Entry Event =

- Host city: Ottawa, Ontario
- Arena: RA Centre
- Dates: September 22–26
- Men's winner: (Quebec) Team Roberge
- Curling club: CC Etchemin, Saint-Romuald
- Skip: Vincent Roberge
- Third: Jean-Michel Arsenault
- Second: Jesse Mullen
- Lead: Julien Tremblay
- Coach: Éric Sylvain
- Finalist: (Manitoba) Sean Grassie
- Women's winner: (Northwest Territories) Team Galusha
- Curling club: Yellowknife CC, Yellowknife
- Skip: Kerry Galusha
- Fourth: Jo-Ann Rizzo
- Third: Sarah Koltun
- Second: Margot Flemming
- Coach: Shona Barbour
- Finalist: (Nova Scotia) Jill Brothers

The 2021 Canadian Curling Pre-Trials Direct-Entry Event was held from September 22 to 26 at the RA Centre in Ottawa, Ontario. The event was held to qualify two men's teams and two women's teams for the 2021 Canadian Olympic Curling Pre-Trials.

== Qualification process ==
Eight men's teams and eight women's team qualified for the event based on their ranking from the World Curling Team Rankings as of July 2021. Teams also had to have three of their four members from their 2020–21 season lineups still intact.

== Men ==
=== Teams ===
The teams are listed as follows:

Skip	Third	Second	Lead	Alternate	Locale
Corey Chambers	Julien Leduc	Devon Wiebe	Stuart Shiells		Winnipeg, Manitoba
Jacques Gauthier	Jordan Peters	Brayden Payette	Cole Chandler		Winnipeg, Manitoba
Sean Grassie	Tyler Drews	Daryl Evans	Rodney Legault		Winnipeg, Manitoba
William Lyburn	Daley Peters	Kennedy Bird	Bryce McEwen		Winnipeg, Manitoba
Shaun Meachem	Brady Scharback	Tyler Hartung (Note: Tyler Hartung spared for Brayden Stewart.)	Jared Latos	Jeff Chambers	Saskatoon, Saskatchewan
Vincent Roberge	Jean-Michel Arsenault	Jesse Mullen	Julien Tremblay		Saint-Romuald, Quebec
JT Ryan	Colin Kurz	Joey Hart	Brendan Bilawka		Winnipeg, Manitoba
Ryan Wiebe	Sean Flatt	Zack Bilawka	Adam Flatt		Winnipeg, Manitoba

=== Knockout brackets ===
Source:

=== A event ===
First Knockout	Qualifier 1
1	(Manitoba) Corey Chambers	7
8	(Manitoba) William Lyburn	5
1	(Manitoba) Corey Chambers	7
5	(Manitoba) JT Ryan	1
4	(Manitoba) Sean Grassie	3
5	(Manitoba) JT Ryan	4
1	(Manitoba) Corey Chambers	4
3	(Quebec) Vincent Roberge	7
2	(Manitoba) Jacques Gauthier	7
7	(Saskatchewan) Shaun Meachem	9
7	(Saskatchewan) Shaun Meachem	3
3	(Quebec) Vincent Roberge	7
3	(Quebec) Vincent Roberge	9
6	(Manitoba) Ryan Wiebe	6

=== B event ===
Second Knockout	Qualifier 2
7	(Saskatchewan) Shaun Meachem	9
8	(Manitoba) William Lyburn	6	8	(Manitoba) William Lyburn	2	5	(Manitoba) JT Ryan	6
4	(Manitoba) Sean Grassie	4	7	(Saskatchewan) Shaun Meachem	5	1	(Manitoba) Corey Chambers	2
5	(Manitoba) JT Ryan	7
2	(Manitoba) Jacques Gauthier	7
2	(Manitoba) Jacques Gauthier	8	5	(Manitoba) JT Ryan	8
6	(Manitoba) Ryan Wiebe	6

=== C event ===
Third Knockout	Qualifier 3
4	(Manitoba) Sean Grassie	7	1	(Manitoba) Corey Chambers	5
2	(Manitoba) Jacques Gauthier	3	4	(Manitoba) Sean Grassie	7	4	(Manitoba) Sean Grassie	6
4	(Manitoba) Sean Grassie	7	7	(Saskatchewan) Shaun Meachem	5
6	(Manitoba) Ryan Wiebe	6
6	(Manitoba) Ryan Wiebe	9
8	(Manitoba) William Lyburn	5

=== Knockout results ===
All draw times are listed in Eastern Time (UTC−04:00).

==== Draw 1 ====
Wednesday, September 22, 12:00 pm

Sheet A	1	2	3	4	5	6	7	8	9	10	Final
(Manitoba) Corey Chambers	1	0	0	1	0	1	1	3	0	X	7
(Manitoba) William Lyburn 🔨	0	0	2	0	1	0	0	0	2	X	5

Sheet B	1	2	3	4	5	6	7	8	9	10	Final
(Manitoba) Sean Grassie	0	0	0	0	0	0	2	0	0	1	3
(Manitoba) JT Ryan 🔨	0	0	0	0	1	1	0	0	2	0	4

Sheet D	1	2	3	4	5	6	7	8	9	10	11	Final
(Manitoba) Jacques Gauthier	0	0	0	1	0	2	0	2	0	2	0	7
(Saskatchewan) Shaun Meachem 🔨	1	0	2	0	1	0	1	0	2	0	2	9

Sheet E	1	2	3	4	5	6	7	8	9	10	Final
(Quebec) Vincent Roberge 🔨	0	3	0	2	0	0	1	0	1	2	9
(Manitoba) Ryan Wiebe	0	0	3	0	2	1	0	0	0	0	6

==== Draw 4 ====
Thursday, September 23, 8:00 am

Sheet A	1	2	3	4	5	6	7	8	9	10	11	Final
(Manitoba) Jacques Gauthier 🔨	0	1	0	0	2	0	2	1	0	0	2	8
(Manitoba) Ryan Wiebe	0	0	0	1	0	1	0	0	3	1	0	6

Sheet E	1	2	3	4	5	6	7	8	9	10	Final
(Manitoba) William Lyburn 🔨	0	0	1	0	2	0	2	0	0	1	6
(Manitoba) Sean Grassie	0	0	0	1	0	1	0	1	1	0	4

==== Draw 5 ====
Thursday, September 23, 12:00 pm

Sheet A	1	2	3	4	5	6	7	8	9	10	Final
(Saskatchewan) Shaun Meachem 🔨	0	0	0	0	2	0	0	0	1	0	3
(Quebec) Vincent Roberge	2	0	1	0	0	0	0	2	0	2	7

Sheet D	1	2	3	4	5	6	7	8	9	10	Final
(Manitoba) Corey Chambers 🔨	1	0	0	0	1	2	1	2	X	X	7
(Manitoba) JT Ryan	0	0	1	0	0	0	0	0	X	X	1

==== Draw 7 ====
Thursday, September 23, 8:00 pm

Sheet D	1	2	3	4	5	6	7	8	9	10	Final
(Saskatchewan) Shaun Meachem	0	0	0	2	1	0	0	2	4	X	9
(Manitoba) William Lyburn 🔨	0	0	1	0	0	0	1	0	0	X	2

Sheet E	1	2	3	4	5	6	7	8	9	10	Final
(Manitoba) Jacques Gauthier 🔨	0	2	0	2	0	1	0	0	2	0	7
(Manitoba) JT Ryan	0	0	1	0	1	0	2	2	0	2	8

==== Draw 8 ====
Friday, September 24, 8:00 am

Sheet B	1	2	3	4	5	6	7	8	9	10	Final
(Manitoba) Ryan Wiebe 🔨	2	0	0	0	2	0	3	0	2	X	9
(Manitoba) William Lyburn	0	0	2	2	0	1	0	0	0	X	5

Sheet C	1	2	3	4	5	6	7	8	9	10	Final
(Manitoba) Sean Grassie	1	0	2	1	1	0	1	1	0	X	7
(Manitoba) Jacques Gauthier 🔨	0	1	0	0	0	1	0	0	1	X	3

==== Draw 10 ====
Friday, September 24, 4:00 pm

Sheet B	1	2	3	4	5	6	7	8	9	10	Final
(Saskatchewan) Shaun Meachem 🔨	0	1	0	0	0	1	1	0	2	0	5
(Manitoba) JT Ryan	0	0	0	2	0	0	0	2	0	3	7

Sheet D	1	2	3	4	5	6	7	8	9	10	11	Final
(Manitoba) Sean Grassie 🔨	0	0	2	1	0	0	0	0	3	0	1	7
(Manitoba) Ryan Wiebe	0	1	0	0	0	0	1	2	0	2	0	6

Sheet E	1	2	3	4	5	6	7	8	9	10	Final
(Manitoba) Corey Chambers 🔨	0	1	0	1	1	0	1	0	0	X	4
(Quebec) Vincent Roberge	2	0	2	0	0	1	0	0	2	X	7

==== Draw 12 ====
Saturday, September 25, 9:00 am

Sheet A	1	2	3	4	5	6	7	8	9	10	Final
(Manitoba) Sean Grassie	0	0	0	0	1	0	2	0	3	1	7
(Saskatchewan) Shaun Meachem 🔨	0	0	0	2	0	2	0	1	0	0	5

Sheet C	1	2	3	4	5	6	7	8	9	10	Final
(Manitoba) JT Ryan	0	2	0	2	0	0	0	0	2	X	6
(Manitoba) Corey Chambers 🔨	0	0	1	0	1	0	0	0	0	X	2

==== Draw 14 ====
Saturday, September 25, 5:00 pm

Sheet B	1	2	3	4	5	6	7	8	9	10	Final
(Manitoba) Corey Chambers	1	0	0	1	0	2	0	1	0	0	5
(Manitoba) Sean Grassie 🔨	0	1	0	0	1	0	3	0	0	1	6

=== Playoffs ===
A vs. B
A	(Quebec) Vincent Roberge	5
B	(Manitoba) JT Ryan	4

Second place game
B	(Manitoba) JT Ryan	6
C	(Manitoba) Sean Grassie	7

Qualify for Pre-Trials
(Quebec) Vincent Roberge
(Manitoba) Sean Grassie

==== A vs. B ====
Saturday, September 25, 9:00 pm

Sheet A	1	2	3	4	5	6	7	8	9	10	Final
(Quebec) Vincent Roberge 🔨	1	0	0	2	0	0	1	0	0	1	5
(Manitoba) JT Ryan	0	0	2	0	1	0	0	1	0	0	4

Winner qualifies for 2021 Canadian Olympic Curling Pre-Trials.

Loser drops to second place game.

==== Second place game ====
Sunday, September 26, 1:30 pm

Sheet C	1	2	3	4	5	6	7	8	9	10	11	Final
(Manitoba) JT Ryan 🔨	0	0	1	0	1	1	0	2	0	1	0	6
(Manitoba) Sean Grassie	0	1	0	2	0	0	1	0	2	0	1	7

Winner qualifies for 2021 Canadian Olympic Curling Pre-Trials.

== Women ==
=== Teams ===
The teams are listed as follows:

Skip	Third	Second	Lead	Alternate	Locale
Jill Brothers	Erin Carmody	Kim Kelly (Note: As second Sarah Murphy did not attend the event, alternate Kim Kelly moved up to play second. Murphy was still listed as the teams alternate on the roster, however.)	Jenn Mitchell	Sarah Murphy	Halifax, Nova Scotia
Jo-Ann Rizzo (Fourth)	Sarah Koltun	Margot Flemming	Kerry Galusha (Skip)	Shona Barbour	Yellowknife, Northwest Territories
Ashley Howard	Kourtney Fesser	Krista Fesser	Kaylin Skinner		Saskatoon, Saskatchewan
Kaitlyn Jones	Robyn Njegovan	Abby Ackland	Sara Oliver	Vanessa Foster	Winnipeg, Manitoba
Lauren Mann	Kira Brunton	Cheryl Kreviazuk	Karen Trines	Marcia Richardson	Ottawa, Ontario
Jessie Hunkin (Note: As skip Robyn Silvernagle was on maternity leave, second Jessie Hunkin moved up to skip and alternate Becca Hebert played second. Silvernagle was listed as the alternate on the roster, however.)	Kristen Streifel	Becca Hebert	Dayna Demers	Robyn Silvernagle	North Battleford, Saskatchewan
Laurie St-Georges	Hailey Armstrong	Emily Riley	Cynthia St-Georges	Isabelle Thiboutot	Laval, Quebec
Sarah Wark	Kristen Pilote	Nicky Kaufman	Oye-Sem Won (Note: Alternate Oye-Sem Won played lead during the tournament, replacing Karla Thompson.)	Karla Thompson	Abbotsford, British Columbia

=== Knockout brackets ===
Source:

=== A event ===
First Knockout	Qualifier 1
1	(Manitoba) Kaitlyn Jones	4
8	(Saskatchewan) Ashley Howard	8
8	(Saskatchewan) Ashley Howard	4
4	(Northwest Territories) Kerry Galusha	9
4	(Northwest Territories) Kerry Galusha	10
5	(British Columbia) Sarah Wark	4
4	(Northwest Territories) Kerry Galusha	6
3	(Saskatchewan) Team Silvernagle	5
2	(Quebec) Laurie St-Georges	8
7	(Nova Scotia) Jill Brothers	4
2	(Quebec) Laurie St-Georges	2
3	(Saskatchewan) Team Silvernagle	11
3	(Saskatchewan) Team Silvernagle	12
6	(Ontario) Lauren Mann	2

=== B event ===
Second Knockout	Qualifier 2
2	(Quebec) Laurie St-Georges	5
1	(Manitoba) Kaitlyn Jones	11	1	(Manitoba) Kaitlyn Jones	6	3	(Saskatchewan) Team Silvernagle	11
5	(British Columbia) Sarah Wark	3	1	(Manitoba) Kaitlyn Jones	8	1	(Manitoba) Kaitlyn Jones	3
6	(Ontario) Lauren Mann	6
8	(Saskatchewan) Ashley Howard	5
7	(Nova Scotia) Jill Brothers	6	6	(Ontario) Lauren Mann	7
6	(Ontario) Lauren Mann	8

=== C event ===
Third Knockout	Qualifier 3
5	(British Columbia) Sarah Wark	7	1	(Manitoba) Kaitlyn Jones	4
8	(Saskatchewan) Ashley Howard	9	7	(Nova Scotia) Jill Brothers	10	7	(Nova Scotia) Jill Brothers	10
8	(Saskatchewan) Ashley Howard	4	6	(Ontario) Lauren Mann	6
7	(Nova Scotia) Jill Brothers	7
7	(Nova Scotia) Jill Brothers	8
2	(Quebec) Laurie St-Georges	5

=== Knockout results ===
All draw times are listed in Eastern Time (UTC−04:00).

==== Draw 1 ====
Wednesday, September 22, 12:00 pm

Sheet C	1	2	3	4	5	6	7	8	9	10	Final
(Manitoba) Kaitlyn Jones	0	0	0	0	3	1	0	0	0	X	4
(Saskatchewan) Ashley Howard 🔨	1	1	2	1	0	0	0	1	2	X	8

==== Draw 2 ====
Wednesday, September 22, 3:30 pm

Sheet A	1	2	3	4	5	6	7	8	9	10	Final
(Saskatchewan) Team Silvernagle	2	0	2	1	2	1	0	4	X	X	12
(Ontario) Lauren Mann 🔨	0	0	0	0	0	0	2	0	X	X	2

Sheet D	1	2	3	4	5	6	7	8	9	10	Final
(Quebec) Laurie St-Georges 🔨	0	3	1	0	0	1	0	3	0	X	8
(Nova Scotia) Jill Brothers	1	0	0	1	0	0	1	0	1	X	4

Sheet E	1	2	3	4	5	6	7	8	9	10	Final
(Northwest Territories) Kerry Galusha	0	1	2	1	0	0	4	0	2	X	10
(British Columbia) Sarah Wark 🔨	1	0	0	0	1	0	0	2	0	X	4

==== Draw 4 ====
Thursday, September 23, 8:00 am

Sheet B	1	2	3	4	5	6	7	8	9	10	Final
(Manitoba) Kaitlyn Jones 🔨	1	0	0	1	2	0	6	1	X	X	11
(British Columbia) Sarah Wark	0	1	1	0	0	1	0	0	X	X	3

Sheet C	1	2	3	4	5	6	7	8	9	10	11	Final
(Nova Scotia) Jill Brothers 🔨	0	1	0	1	0	1	1	1	1	0	0	6
(Ontario) Lauren Mann	1	0	1	0	3	0	0	0	0	1	2	8

Sheet D	1	2	3	4	5	6	7	8	9	10	Final
(Saskatchewan) Ashley Howard	0	1	0	0	1	0	0	2	X	X	4
(Northwest Territories) Kerry Galusha 🔨	0	0	3	1	0	2	3	0	X	X	9

==== Draw 5 ====
Thursday, September 23, 12:00 pm

Sheet E	1	2	3	4	5	6	7	8	9	10	Final
(Quebec) Laurie St-Georges	0	0	0	0	0	1	0	1	X	X	2
(Saskatchewan) Team Silvernagle 🔨	0	2	1	3	2	0	3	0	X	X	11

==== Draw 6 ====
Thursday, September 23, 4:00 pm

Sheet A	1	2	3	4	5	6	7	8	9	10	Final
(Saskatchewan) Ashley Howard	0	0	0	0	3	0	2	0	0	0	5
(Ontario) Lauren Mann 🔨	1	0	0	1	0	1	0	1	2	1	7

==== Draw 7 ====
Thursday, September 23, 8:00 pm

Sheet A	1	2	3	4	5	6	7	8	9	10	Final
(Quebec) Laurie St-Georges	0	1	0	2	0	1	0	0	0	1	5
(Manitoba) Kaitlyn Jones 🔨	2	0	1	0	1	0	0	0	2	0	6

==== Draw 8 ====
Friday, September 24, 8:00 am

Sheet D	1	2	3	4	5	6	7	8	9	10	Final
(Nova Scotia) Jill Brothers 🔨	0	0	1	1	0	1	0	3	0	2	8
(Quebec) Laurie St-Georges	0	1	0	0	1	0	2	0	1	0	5

==== Draw 9 ====
Friday, September 24, 12:00 pm

Sheet A	1	2	3	4	5	6	7	8	9	10	Final
(British Columbia) Sarah Wark 🔨	2	0	2	0	1	0	0	0	2	X	7
(Saskatchewan) Ashley Howard	0	3	0	1	0	3	1	1	0	X	9

==== Draw 10 ====
Friday, September 24, 4:00 pm

Sheet A	1	2	3	4	5	6	7	8	9	10	Final
(Northwest Territories) Kerry Galusha 🔨	1	0	1	2	0	0	0	2	0	0	6
(Saskatchewan) Team Silvernagle	0	0	0	0	1	0	1	0	1	2	5

Sheet C	1	2	3	4	5	6	7	8	9	10	Final
(Manitoba) Kaitlyn Jones 🔨	2	1	1	0	1	1	0	0	0	2	8
(Ontario) Lauren Mann	0	0	0	1	0	0	1	1	3	0	6

==== Draw 11 ====
Friday, September 24, 8:00 pm

Sheet A	1	2	3	4	5	6	7	8	9	10	Final
(Saskatchewan) Ashley Howard 🔨	0	0	0	0	1	1	1	0	1	0	4
(Nova Scotia) Jill Brothers	0	0	0	2	0	0	0	2	0	3	7

==== Draw 12 ====
Saturday, September 25, 9:00 am

Sheet D	1	2	3	4	5	6	7	8	9	10	Final
(Saskatchewan) Team Silvernagle	3	0	2	0	3	2	1	X	X	X	11
(Manitoba) Kaitlyn Jones 🔨	0	1	0	2	0	0	0	X	X	X	3

Sheet E	1	2	3	4	5	6	7	8	9	10	Final
(Nova Scotia) Jill Brothers 🔨	0	2	0	0	1	0	0	2	2	3	10
(Ontario) Lauren Mann	1	0	1	1	0	3	0	0	0	0	6

==== Draw 14 ====
Saturday, September 25, 5:00 pm

Sheet D	1	2	3	4	5	6	7	8	9	10	Final
(Manitoba) Kaitlyn Jones 🔨	1	0	1	1	0	1	0	0	0	X	4
(Nova Scotia) Jill Brothers	0	1	0	0	2	0	3	1	3	X	10

=== Playoffs ===
A vs. B
A	(Northwest Territories) Kerry Galusha	10
B	(Saskatchewan) Team Silvernagle	8

Second place game
B	(Saskatchewan) Team Silvernagle	6
C	(Nova Scotia) Jill Brothers	8

Qualify for Pre-Trials
(Northwest Territories) Kerry Galusha
(Nova Scotia) Jill Brothers

==== A vs. B ====
Saturday, September 25, 5:00 pm

Sheet C	1	2	3	4	5	6	7	8	9	10	11	Final
(Northwest Territories) Kerry Galusha 🔨	0	0	3	0	0	2	2	0	1	0	2	10
(Saskatchewan) Team Silvernagle	0	2	0	2	1	0	0	1	0	2	0	8

Winner qualifies for 2021 Canadian Olympic Curling Pre-Trials.

Loser drops to second place game.

==== Second place game ====
Sunday, September 26, 10:00 am

Sheet D	1	2	3	4	5	6	7	8	9	10	Final
(Saskatchewan) Team Silvernagle 🔨	1	0	1	0	3	0	0	0	1	X	6
(Nova Scotia) Jill Brothers	0	2	0	2	0	0	3	1	0	X	8

Winner qualifies for 2021 Canadian Olympic Curling Pre-Trials.
