= Lauren Mann =

Canadian curler (born 1985)

- Curler
- Born: January 27, 1985 (age 41); Sudbury, Ontario

Team
- Curling club: Idylwylde G&CC, Sudbury
- Skip: Lauren Mann
- Third: Sadie Pinksen
- Second: Leigh Gustafson
- Lead: Alison Taylor

Curling career
- Member Association: Ontario (2001–2014; 2020–2023); Quebec (2014–2020); Northern Ontario (2024–2026); Nunavut (2026–present)
- Hearts: 2 (2015, 2017)
- Top CTRS ranking: 19th (2014—15)
Medal record
Women's curling
Representing Ontario
Canada Winter Games
Silver medal – second place	2003 Bathurst

Lauren Mann (born January 27, 1985) is a Canadian curler from Aylmer, Quebec. She currently skips her own team out of Iqaluit, Nunavut.

== Career ==
=== Juniors ===
As a junior curler, Mann was the 2002 Ontario Winter Games championship playing third for Laura Payne, and won a silver medal for Ontario at the 2003 Canada Winter Games. Also in 2003, she won the Ontario Junior Mixed Championship playing third for Chris Gardner. In 2005, she lost in the final of the Pepsi Ontario Junior Curling Championships to Erin Morrissey. She was also the runner-up in 2006, losing to Lisa Farnell.

=== Women's ===
In 2014, Mann moved to Quebec and entered the 2015 Quebec Scotties Tournament of Hearts with teammates Amelie Blais, Brittany O'Rourke and Anne-Marie Filteau. She would win the event after posting an 8–2 round robin record, and defeating Roxane Perron in the final. With the win, Mann would go on to represent Quebec at the 2015 Scotties Tournament of Hearts, leading her province to a 3–8 record. For the next season, Lana Gosselin and Brittany O'Rourke joined her front end. Mann led her team to the final of the 2016 Quebec Scotties Tournament of Hearts, where she lost to Marie-France Larouche.

In 2016, Mann joined the Ève Bélisle rink as her third. The team won the 2017 Quebec Scotties Tournament of Hearts, and went on to represent Quebec at the 2017 Scotties Tournament of Hearts. There, the team finished with a 7-4 record, just missing the playoffs. The next season, the Bélisle team lost in the final of the 2018 Quebec Scotties Tournament of Hearts against the Émilia Gagné rink. In 2019, she joined the Julie Tippin rink as her third. The team found some success on the tour, winning the 2019 Stroud Sleeman Cash Spiel. Tippin would be able to play at the 2020 Quebec Scotties Tournament of Hearts due to a new birth right rule. At the Quebec Scotties, the team finished with a disappointing 4-3 record.

In 2020, Mann formed a new rink based out of Ontario, with Kira Brunton, Cheryl Kreviazuk and Karen Trines. The team found immediate success in their first tour event, surprising a short-handed Team Jennifer Jones in the final of the 2020 Stu Sells Toronto Tankard. The next season, the team played in the 2021 Canadian Curling Pre-Trials Direct-Entry Event, but were eliminated in the triple knockout event with just one win. The team played in the postponed 2022 Ontario Scotties Tournament of Hearts with Marcia Richardson replacing Trines at lead. There, Mann led the team to a 2–5 record.

Mann formed a new team for the 2022–23 curling season with Newfoundlanders Shelley Hardy (now living in Arnprior, Ontario) and Stephanie LeDrew (living in Sarnia, Ontario), plus Stephanie Corado at lead. The Team won the Guelph CurlON women's spiel early in the season which helped them get enough tour points to qualify for the 2023 Ontario Scotties Tournament of Hearts. At the provincial Hearts that season, the team finished with a 1–4 record.

== Personal life ==
Mann was born in Sudbury, Ontario, and moved away when she was eight. Mann works as a manager, clinical certification and exams, for Speech-Language & Audiology Canada. She is in a relationship with Don Bowser.
