= 2021 Canadian Olympic Curling Pre-Trials =

- Host city: Liverpool, Nova Scotia
- Arena: Queens Place Emera Centre
- Dates: October 25–31
- Men's winner: (Manitoba) Team Gunnlaugson
- Curling club: Morris CC, Morris, Manitoba
- Skip: Jason Gunnlaugson
- Third: Adam Casey
- Second: Matt Wozniak
- Lead: Connor Njegovan
- Coach: Gerry Vendernberghe
- Finalist: (Ontario) Tanner Horgan
- Women's winner: (Ontario) Team McCarville
- Curling club: Fort William CC, Thunder Bay, Ontario
- Skip: Krista McCarville
- Third: Kendra Lilly
- Second: Ashley Sippala
- Lead: Sarah Potts
- Coach: Rick Lang
- Finalist: (Ontario) Jacqueline Harrison

The 2021 Canadian Olympic Curling Pre-Trials were held from October 25 to 31 at the Queens Place Emera Centre in Liverpool, Nova Scotia. The event qualified two teams for the 2021 Canadian Olympic Curling Trials in Saskatoon, Saskatchewan.

== Qualification process ==
Fourteen men's teams and fourteen women's team will qualify for the event. Nine men's and ten women's teams qualified based on their World Curling Team Rankings as of July 2021. Teams also had to have three of their four members from their 2020–21 season lineups still intact. Additionally, the three men's and two women's teams that did not advance to the trials through the 2021 Canadian Curling Trials Direct-Entry Event qualified for the event. The final two teams of each gender were the two qualifiers from the 2021 Canadian Curling Pre-Trials Direct-Entry Event.

=== Men ===
Qualification method	Qualifying team
Participated in, but did not qualify through Direct-Entry Event	(Ontario) Glenn Howard
Participated in, but did not qualify through Direct-Entry Event	(Saskatchewan) Colton Flasch
Participated in, but did not qualify through Direct-Entry Event	(Manitoba) Jason Gunnlaugson
Next highest team on WCT rankings	(Manitoba) Pat Simmons
Next highest team on WCT rankings	(Ontario) Tanner Horgan
Next highest team on WCT rankings	(Manitoba) Braden Calvert
Next highest team on WCT rankings	(British Columbia) Tyler Tardi
Next highest team on WCT rankings	(Alberta) Jeremy Harty
Next highest team on WCT rankings	(Alberta) Karsten Sturmay
Next highest team on WCT rankings	(Ontario) Pat Ferris
Next highest team on WCT rankings	(Nova Scotia) Paul Flemming
Next highest team on WCT rankings	(Quebec) Mike Fournier
Pre-Trials Direct-Entry Qualifier #1	(Quebec) Vincent Roberge
Pre-Trials Direct-Entry Qualifier #2	(Manitoba) Sean Grassie

=== Women ===
Qualification method	Qualifying team
Participated in, but did not qualify through Direct-Entry Event	(British Columbia) Corryn Brown
Participated in, but did not qualify through Direct-Entry Event	(Prince Edward Island) Suzanne Birt
Next highest team on WCT rankings	(Manitoba) Mackenzie Zacharias
Next highest team on WCT rankings	(Manitoba) Beth Peterson
Next highest team on WCT rankings	(Ontario) Jestyn Murphy
Next highest team on WCT rankings	(Saskatchewan) Sherry Anderson
Next highest team on WCT rankings	(Ontario) Hollie Duncan
Next highest team on WCT rankings	(Ontario) Krista McCarville
Next highest team on WCT rankings	(Saskatchewan) Penny Barker
Next highest team on WCT rankings	(Manitoba) Darcy Robertson
Next highest team on WCT rankings	(Ontario) Danielle Inglis
Next highest team on WCT rankings	(Ontario) Jacqueline Harrison
Pre-Trials Direct-Entry Qualifier #1	(Northwest Territories) Kerry Galusha
Pre-Trials Direct-Entry Qualifier #2	(Nova Scotia) Jill Brothers

== Men ==
=== Teams ===
The teams are listed as follows:

Skip	Third	Second	Lead	Alternate	Club
Braden Calvert	Kyle Kurz	Ian McMillan	Rob Gordon		Assiniboine Memorial CC, Winnipeg, Manitoba
Pat Ferris	Ian Dickie	Connor Duhaime	Zack Shurtleff		Grimsby CC, Grimsby, Ontario
Colton Flasch	Catlin Schneider	Kevin Marsh	Dan Marsh		Nutana CC, Saskatoon, Saskatchewan
Paul Flemming	Scott Saccary	Ryan Abraham	Phil Crowell		Halifax CC, Halifax, Nova Scotia
Félix Asselin (Fourth)	Martin Crête	Mike Fournier (Skip)	Jean-François Trépanier		Glenmore CC, Montreal, Quebec
Sean Grassie	Tyler Drews	Daryl Evans	Rodney Legault	Nick Drews	Deer Lodge CC, Winnipeg, Manitoba
Jason Gunnlaugson	Adam Casey	Matt Wozniak	Connor Njegovan		Morris CC, Morris, Manitoba
Jeremy Harty	Kyler Kleibrink	Joshua Kiist	Kurtis Goller		The Glencoe Club, Calgary, Alberta
Tanner Horgan	Jonathan Beuk	Wesley Forget	Scott Chadwick	Jacob Horgan	Cataraqui G&CC, Kingston, Ontario
Glenn Howard	Scott Howard	David Mathers	Tim March		Penetanguishene CC, Penetanguishene, Ontario
Vincent Roberge	Jean-Michel Arsenault	Jesse Mullen	Julien Tremblay	François Roberge	Curling Etchemin, Saint-Romuald, Quebec
Pat Simmons	Colton Lott	Kyle Doering	Tanner Lott	Emerson Klimpke	Winnipeg Beach CR, Winnipeg Beach, Manitoba
Karsten Sturmay	Tristan Steinke	Chris Kennedy	Glenn Venance		Saville Community SC, Edmonton, Alberta
Tyler Tardi	Sterling Middleton	Jason Ginter	Jordan Tardi		Langley CC, Langley, British Columbia

=== Round-robin standings ===
Final round-robin standings

Key
Teams to Playoffs

Pool A	W	L	DSC
(Ontario) Tanner Horgan	6	0	452.0
(Manitoba) Jason Gunnlaugson	4	2	407.0
(Manitoba) Pat Simmons	4	2	439.5
(Quebec) Mike Fournier	3	3	340.5
(Quebec) Vincent Roberge	2	4	388.10
(Alberta) Karsten Sturmay	2	4	382.5
(Alberta) Jeremy Harty	0	6	524.8

Pool B	W	L	DSC
(Ontario) Glenn Howard	5	1	170.0
(Nova Scotia) Paul Flemming	4	2	383.3
(British Columbia) Tyler Tardi	4	2	329.7
(Saskatchewan) Colton Flasch	4	2	305.4
(Manitoba) Braden Calvert	2	4	502.0
(Ontario) Pat Ferris	2	4	619.3
(Manitoba) Sean Grassie	0	6	815.8

=== Round-robin results ===
All draw times are listed in Atlantic Daylight Time (UTC−03:00).

==== Draw 2 ====
Monday, October 25, 9:00 pm

Sheet B	1	2	3	4	5	6	7	8	9	10	Final
(Manitoba) Jason Gunnlaugson	0	0	3	1	1	0	1	0	1	X	7
(Manitoba) Pat Simmons 🔨	0	1	0	0	0	2	0	1	0	X	4

Sheet C	1	2	3	4	5	6	7	8	9	10	Final
(Ontario) Tanner Horgan 🔨	1	0	1	0	3	0	1	0	1	X	7
(Alberta) Jeremy Harty	0	0	0	0	0	1	0	1	0	X	2

==== Draw 3 ====
Tuesday, October 26, 8:00 am

Sheet A	1	2	3	4	5	6	7	8	9	10	Final
(Alberta) Karsten Sturmay 🔨	1	0	0	1	1	0	2	1	1	1	8
(Quebec) Mike Fournier	0	2	0	0	0	4	0	0	0	0	6

Sheet B	1	2	3	4	5	6	7	8	9	10	Final
(Saskatchewan) Colton Flasch 🔨	0	2	0	1	0	0	2	1	0	1	7
(Ontario) Glenn Howard	0	0	2	0	1	1	0	0	2	0	6

Sheet C	1	2	3	4	5	6	7	8	9	10	Final
(Ontario) Pat Ferris	0	0	3	0	2	0	0	1	0	X	6
(Nova Scotia) Paul Flemming 🔨	0	0	0	2	0	4	3	0	2	X	11

Sheet D	1	2	3	4	5	6	7	8	9	10	Final
(Manitoba) Braden Calvert	0	0	0	0	3	0	2	0	1	0	6
(British Columbia) Tyler Tardi 🔨	1	0	1	1	0	2	0	2	0	1	8

==== Draw 5 ====
Tuesday, October 26, 4:00 pm

Sheet A	1	2	3	4	5	6	7	8	9	10	Final
(Nova Scotia) Paul Flemming	0	0	1	0	2	0	1	0	2	0	6
(Ontario) Glenn Howard 🔨	1	0	0	1	0	1	0	2	0	2	7

Sheet B	1	2	3	4	5	6	7	8	9	10	Final
(Alberta) Jeremy Harty	0	2	1	0	2	0	0	0	X	X	5
(Quebec) Mike Fournier 🔨	1	0	0	3	0	3	1	2	X	X	10

Sheet C	1	2	3	4	5	6	7	8	9	10	Final
(British Columbia) Tyler Tardi 🔨	0	2	3	2	1	0	0	1	X	X	9
(Manitoba) Sean Grassie	0	0	0	0	0	0	2	0	X	X	2

Sheet D	1	2	3	4	5	6	7	8	9	10	11	Final
(Quebec) Vincent Roberge 🔨	0	2	0	0	3	0	0	2	0	1	0	8
(Manitoba) Jason Gunnlaugson	1	0	1	2	0	1	2	0	1	0	1	9

Sheet E	1	2	3	4	5	6	7	8	9	10	Final
(Manitoba) Pat Simmons 🔨	2	0	0	2	0	0	1	0	1	0	6
(Ontario) Tanner Horgan	0	1	0	0	3	0	0	2	0	1	7

==== Draw 6 ====
Tuesday, October 26, 8:00 pm

Sheet C	1	2	3	4	5	6	7	8	9	10	Final
(Saskatchewan) Colton Flasch 🔨	0	0	0	2	1	0	0	0	0	0	3
(Manitoba) Braden Calvert	0	0	0	0	0	1	1	0	0	0	2

==== Draw 7 ====
Wednesday, October 27, 8:00 am

Sheet A	1	2	3	4	5	6	7	8	9	10	Final
(Quebec) Vincent Roberge	0	0	0	0	1	0	2	0	1	0	4
(Ontario) Tanner Horgan 🔨	0	1	0	1	0	1	0	1	0	1	5

Sheet C	1	2	3	4	5	6	7	8	9	10	Final
(Alberta) Karsten Sturmay 🔨	0	2	0	1	0	2	0	2	0	0	7
(Manitoba) Jason Gunnlaugson	2	0	3	0	1	0	2	0	2	2	12

==== Draw 8 ====
Wednesday, October 27, 12:00 pm

Sheet A	1	2	3	4	5	6	7	8	9	10	Final
(British Columbia) Tyler Tardi 🔨	2	0	0	2	0	0	4	1	0	X	9
(Ontario) Pat Ferris	0	2	1	0	1	0	0	0	1	X	5

Sheet C	1	2	3	4	5	6	7	8	9	10	11	Final
(Quebec) Mike Fournier 🔨	2	0	2	0	0	1	0	0	0	2	0	7
(Manitoba) Pat Simmons	0	1	0	3	1	0	0	1	1	0	1	8

Sheet D	1	2	3	4	5	6	7	8	9	10	Final
(Nova Scotia) Paul Flemming 🔨	0	0	0	1	1	1	0	X	X	X	3
(Manitoba) Braden Calvert	1	0	3	0	0	0	4	X	X	X	8

Sheet E	1	2	3	4	5	6	7	8	9	10	Final
(Manitoba) Sean Grassie 🔨	0	0	2	0	2	0	0	0	X	X	4
(Saskatchewan) Colton Flasch	0	3	0	2	0	2	0	1	X	X	8

==== Draw 10 ====
Wednesday, October 27, 8:00 pm

Sheet A	1	2	3	4	5	6	7	8	9	10	Final
(Manitoba) Jason Gunnlaugson	0	1	0	1	2	1	1	2	X	X	8
(Alberta) Jeremy Harty 🔨	0	0	0	0	0	0	0	0	X	X	0

Sheet C	1	2	3	4	5	6	7	8	9	10	Final
(Ontario) Glenn Howard 🔨	2	0	1	0	0	0	1	1	0	1	6
(British Columbia) Tyler Tardi	0	1	0	0	1	0	0	0	2	0	4

Sheet D	1	2	3	4	5	6	7	8	9	10	Final
(Ontario) Tanner Horgan 🔨	0	2	0	0	2	4	4	X	X	X	12
(Alberta) Karsten Sturmay	0	0	1	0	0	0	0	X	X	X	1

Sheet E	1	2	3	4	5	6	7	8	9	10	Final
(Quebec) Mike Fournier	0	0	3	0	2	2	0	1	2	X	10
(Quebec) Vincent Roberge 🔨	0	1	0	3	0	0	1	0	0	X	5

==== Draw 11 ====
Thursday, October 28, 8:00 am

Sheet B	1	2	3	4	5	6	7	8	9	10	Final
(Manitoba) Sean Grassie	0	1	0	0	0	0	1	0	0	0	2
(Nova Scotia) Paul Flemming 🔨	0	0	1	0	1	1	0	0	1	1	5

Sheet D	1	2	3	4	5	6	7	8	9	10	Final
(Ontario) Pat Ferris 🔨	1	0	0	1	0	0	0	1	0	X	3
(Saskatchewan) Colton Flasch	0	0	2	0	0	1	2	0	2	X	7

==== Draw 13 ====
Thursday, October 28, 4:00 pm

Sheet A	1	2	3	4	5	6	7	8	9	10	Final
(Manitoba) Braden Calvert	0	3	0	2	0	0	0	4	0	X	9
(Manitoba) Sean Grassie 🔨	1	0	2	0	0	2	0	0	2	X	7

Sheet B	1	2	3	4	5	6	7	8	9	10	Final
(British Columbia) Tyler Tardi 🔨	0	2	2	0	5	1	0	X	X	X	10
(Saskatchewan) Colton Flasch	0	0	0	1	0	0	2	X	X	X	3

Sheet C	1	2	3	4	5	6	7	8	9	10	Final
(Alberta) Jeremy Harty	0	0	1	0	2	0	1	0	0	X	4
(Alberta) Karsten Sturmay 🔨	0	2	0	2	0	1	0	2	0	X	7

Sheet D	1	2	3	4	5	6	7	8	9	10	Final
(Manitoba) Pat Simmons 🔨	0	2	0	2	2	0	1	0	2	X	9
(Quebec) Vincent Roberge	1	0	2	0	0	2	0	1	0	X	6

Sheet E	1	2	3	4	5	6	7	8	9	10	11	Final
(Ontario) Tanner Horgan	0	2	0	1	0	1	0	1	0	0	1	6
(Manitoba) Jason Gunnlaugson 🔨	2	0	0	0	0	0	2	0	0	1	0	5

==== Draw 14 ====
Thursday, October 28, 8:00 pm

Sheet E	1	2	3	4	5	6	7	8	9	10	Final
(Ontario) Glenn Howard 🔨	2	0	2	1	1	0	2	0	X	X	8
(Ontario) Pat Ferris	0	1	0	0	0	1	0	1	X	X	3

==== Draw 15 ====
Friday, October 29, 8:00 am

Sheet A	1	2	3	4	5	6	7	8	9	10	Final
(Manitoba) Pat Simmons 🔨	1	1	1	1	0	4	0	2	X	X	10
(Alberta) Karsten Sturmay	0	0	0	0	1	0	0	0	X	X	1

Sheet C	1	2	3	4	5	6	7	8	9	10	Final
(Manitoba) Jason Gunnlaugson	0	0	0	0	2	1	1	0	X	X	4
(Quebec) Mike Fournier 🔨	1	2	3	2	0	0	0	3	X	X	11

Sheet E	1	2	3	4	5	6	7	8	9	10	Final
(Quebec) Vincent Roberge 🔨	0	3	2	0	2	0	1	2	X	X	10
(Alberta) Jeremy Harty	1	0	0	1	0	1	0	0	X	X	3

==== Draw 16 ====
Friday, October 29, 12:00 pm

Sheet B	1	2	3	4	5	6	7	8	9	10	Final
(Ontario) Pat Ferris	1	0	2	0	1	1	1	1	3	X	10
(Manitoba) Braden Calvert 🔨	0	2	0	2	0	0	0	0	0	X	4

Sheet D	1	2	3	4	5	6	7	8	9	10	Final
(Ontario) Glenn Howard 🔨	0	1	0	1	0	2	0	0	1	1	6
(Manitoba) Sean Grassie	0	0	1	0	1	0	0	1	0	0	3

Sheet E	1	2	3	4	5	6	7	8	9	10	Final
(Nova Scotia) Paul Flemming 🔨	2	0	0	0	1	0	2	0	3	1	9
(British Columbia) Tyler Tardi	0	0	0	2	0	2	0	2	0	0	6

==== Draw 17 ====
Friday, October 29, 4:00 pm

Sheet D	1	2	3	4	5	6	7	8	9	10	11	Final
(Quebec) Mike Fournier 🔨	2	0	1	0	0	1	0	0	2	1	0	7
(Ontario) Tanner Horgan	0	1	0	1	3	0	1	1	0	0	1	8

==== Draw 18 ====
Friday, October 29, 8:00 pm

Sheet A	1	2	3	4	5	6	7	8	9	10	Final
(Saskatchewan) Colton Flasch 🔨	0	0	0	1	0	0	1	1	0	0	3
(Nova Scotia) Paul Flemming	1	0	0	0	0	3	0	0	1	1	6

Sheet B	1	2	3	4	5	6	7	8	9	10	Final
(Alberta) Karsten Sturmay 🔨	2	0	1	0	0	1	0	2	0	X	6
(Quebec) Vincent Roberge	0	2	0	0	3	0	4	0	1	X	10

Sheet C	1	2	3	4	5	6	7	8	9	10	Final
(Manitoba) Sean Grassie	0	0	1	0	2	0	0	0	2	X	5
(Ontario) Pat Ferris 🔨	0	1	0	2	0	2	2	2	0	X	9

Sheet D	1	2	3	4	5	6	7	8	9	10	Final
(Alberta) Jeremy Harty 🔨	0	1	0	0	0	3	0	0	2	0	6
(Manitoba) Pat Simmons	1	0	2	0	1	0	2	1	0	2	9

Sheet E	1	2	3	4	5	6	7	8	9	10	Final
(Manitoba) Braden Calvert	0	0	0	1	0	0	2	1	0	X	4
(Ontario) Glenn Howard 🔨	0	2	0	0	0	2	0	0	2	X	6

=== Playoffs ===
A Semifinals			A Final
A1	(Ontario) Tanner Horgan	6
B2	(Nova Scotia) Paul Flemming	5	A1	(Ontario) Tanner Horgan	8
B1	(Ontario) Glenn Howard	6	A2	(Manitoba) Jason Gunnlaugson	9
A2	(Manitoba) Jason Gunnlaugson	8

B Quarterfinals			B Semifinal			B Final
A3	(Manitoba) Pat Simmons	9
B2	(Nova Scotia) Paul Flemming	4	A3	(Manitoba) Pat Simmons	2
B3	(British Columbia) Tyler Tardi	4	B1	(Ontario) Glenn Howard	9
B1	(Ontario) Glenn Howard	6				B1	(Ontario) Glenn Howard	4
						A1	(Ontario) Tanner Horgan	7

==== A Semifinals ====
Saturday, October 30, 1:30 pm

Sheet C	1	2	3	4	5	6	7	8	9	10	Final
(Ontario) Tanner Horgan 🔨	0	1	0	0	1	0	0	3	0	1	6
(Nova Scotia) Paul Flemming	0	0	0	1	0	1	0	0	3	0	5

Player percentages
(Manitoba) Team Horgan		(Nova Scotia) Team Flemming	
Scott Chadwick	94%	Phil Crowell	96%
Wesley Forget	85%	Ryan Abraham	81%
Jonathan Beuk	90%	Scott Saccary	85%
Tanner Horgan	85%	Paul Flemming	93%
Total	88%	Total	89%

Sheet E	1	2	3	4	5	6	7	8	9	10	Final
(Ontario) Glenn Howard 🔨	0	0	0	4	0	2	0	0	0	0	6
(Manitoba) Jason Gunnlaugson	0	1	0	0	2	0	2	1	1	1	8

Player percentages
(Ontario) Team Howard		(Manitoba) Team Gunnlaugson	
Tim March	83%	Connor Njegovan	79%
David Mathers	71%	Matt Wozniak	79%
Scott Howard	73%	Adam Casey	75%
Glenn Howard	61%	Jason Gunnlaugson	75%
Total	72%	Total	77%

==== A Final ====
Sunday, October 31, 9:00 am

Sheet D	1	2	3	4	5	6	7	8	9	10	Final
(Ontario) Tanner Horgan 🔨	1	0	1	0	2	0	1	0	3	0	8
(Manitoba) Jason Gunnlaugson	0	1	0	2	0	2	0	3	0	1	9

Player percentages
(Manitoba) Team Horgan		(Manitoba) Team Gunnlaugson	
Scott Chadwick	99%	Connor Njegovan	94%
Wesley Forget	94%	Matt Wozniak	93%
Jonathan Beuk	91%	Adam Casey	88%
Tanner Horgan	90%	Jason Gunnlaugson	93%
Total	93%	Total	92%

Winner qualifies for 2021 Canadian Olympic Curling Trials.

Loser drops to B Final.

==== B Quarterfinals ====
Saturday, October 30, 7:00 pm

Sheet B	1	2	3	4	5	6	7	8	9	10	Final
(British Columbia) Tyler Tardi	0	0	0	0	1	0	2	0	0	1	4
(Ontario) Glenn Howard 🔨	2	0	0	0	0	1	0	1	2	0	6

Player percentages
(British Columbia) Team Tardi		(Ontario) Team Howard	
Jordan Tardi	86%	Tim March	95%
Jason Ginter	85%	David Mathers	85%
Sterling Middleton	91%	Scott Howard	84%
Tyler Tardi	79%	Glenn Howard	89%
Total	85%	Total	88%

Sheet E	1	2	3	4	5	6	7	8	9	10	Final
(Manitoba) Pat Simmons	0	2	1	0	0	2	1	0	3	X	9
(Nova Scotia) Paul Flemming 🔨	2	0	0	1	0	0	0	1	0	X	4

Player percentages
(Manitoba) Team Simmons		(Nova Scotia) Team Flemming	
Tanner Lott	92%	Phil Crowell	76%
Kyle Doering	83%	Ryan Abraham	79%
Colton Lott	76%	Scott Saccary	81%
Pat Simmons	93%	Paul Flemming	64%
Total	86%	Total	75%

==== B Semifinal ====
Sunday, October 31, 2:00 pm

Sheet C	1	2	3	4	5	6	7	8	9	10	Final
(Manitoba) Pat Simmons	0	0	1	0	0	1	0	0	X	X	2
(Ontario) Glenn Howard 🔨	3	0	0	1	2	0	3	0	X	X	9

Player percentages
(Manitoba) Team Simmons		(Ontario) Team Howard	
Tanner Lott	94%	Tim March	94%
Kyle Doering	73%	David Mathers	97%
Colton Lott	80%	Scott Howard	97%
Pat Simmons	67%	Glenn Howard	97%
Total	79%	Total	96%

==== B Final ====
Sunday, October 31, 7:30 pm

Sheet D	1	2	3	4	5	6	7	8	9	10	Final
(Ontario) Glenn Howard	0	0	1	0	0	0	1	0	2	0	4
(Ontario) Tanner Horgan 🔨	0	2	0	1	0	1	0	2	0	1	7

Player percentages
(Ontario) Team Howard		(Manitoba) Team Horgan	
Tim March	100%	Scott Chadwick	89%
David Mathers	80%	Wesley Forget	89%
Scott Howard	73%	Jonathan Beuk	98%
Glenn Howard	85%	Tanner Horgan	94%
Total	84%	Total	92%

Winner qualifies for 2021 Canadian Olympic Curling Trials.

== Women ==
=== Teams ===
The teams are listed as follows:

Skip	Third	Second	Lead	Alternate	Club
Sherry Anderson	Nancy Martin	Chaelynn Kitz	Breanne Knapp		Martensville CC, Saskatoon, Saskatchewan
Penny Barker	Christie Gamble	Jenna Enge	Danielle Sicinski		Moose Jaw Ford CC, Moose Jaw, Saskatchewan
Suzanne Birt	Marie Christianson	Meaghan Hughes	Michelle McQuaid		Cornwall CC, Cornwall & Montague CC, Montague, Prince Edward Island
Jill Brothers	Erin Carmody	Sarah Murphy	Jenn Mitchell	Kim Kelly	Halifax CC, Halifax, Nova Scotia
Corryn Brown	Erin Pincott	Dezaray Hawes	Samantha Fisher		Kamloops CC, Kamloops, British Columbia
Hollie Duncan	Megan Balsdon	Rachelle Strybosch	Tess Bobbie	Julie Tippin	Woodstock CC, Woodstock, Ontario
Jo-Ann Rizzo (Fourth)	Sarah Koltun	Margot Flemming	Kerry Galusha (Skip)	Shona Barbour	Yellowknife CC, Yellowknife, Northwest Territories
Jacqueline Harrison	Allison Flaxey	Lynn Kreviazuk	Laura Hickey	Kelly Middaugh	Dundas Valley G&CC, Dundas, Ontario
Danielle Inglis	Jessica Corrado	Stephanie Corrado	Cassandra de Groot		Dixie CC, Mississauga, Ontario
Krista McCarville	Kendra Lilly	Ashley Sippala	Sarah Potts		Fort William CC, Thunder Bay, Ontario
Jestyn Murphy	Carly Howard	Stephanie Matheson	Grace Holyoke	Janet Murphy	Mississaugua G&CC, Mississauga, Ontario
Beth Peterson	Jenna Loder	Katherine Doerksen	Melissa Gordon	Meghan Walter	Assiniboine Memorial CC, Winnipeg, Manitoba
Darcy Robertson	Laura Burtnyk	Gaetanne Gauthier	Krysten Karwacki		Assiniboine Memorial CC, Winnipeg, Manitoba
Mackenzie Zacharias	Karlee Burgess	Emily Zacharias	Lauren Lenentine		Altona CC, Altona, Manitoba

=== Round-robin standings ===
Final round-robin standings

Key
Teams to Playoffs

Pool A	W	L	DSC
(Ontario) Krista McCarville	5	1	311.1
(Ontario) Jacqueline Harrison	5	1	743.4
(British Columbia) Corryn Brown	4	2	630.2
(Saskatchewan) Penny Barker	3	3	894.0
(Ontario) Jestyn Murphy	2	4	330.4
(Manitoba) Beth Peterson	1	5	381.1
(Northwest Territories) Kerry Galusha	1	5	351.6

Pool B	W	L	DSC
(Prince Edward Island) Suzanne Birt	4	2	310.8
(Manitoba) Mackenzie Zacharias	4	2	420.2
(Saskatchewan) Sherry Anderson	4	2	499.7
(Manitoba) Darcy Robertson	3	3	410.2
(Ontario) Hollie Duncan	3	3	814.2
(Ontario) Danielle Inglis	2	4	538.5
(Nova Scotia) Jill Brothers	1	5	381.1

=== Round-robin results ===
All draw times are listed in Atlantic Daylight Time (UTC−03:00).

==== Draw 1 ====
Monday, October 25, 5:00 pm

Sheet A	1	2	3	4	5	6	7	8	9	10	Final
(British Columbia) Corryn Brown	0	0	1	1	2	3	0	0	2	X	9
(Manitoba) Beth Peterson 🔨	0	1	0	0	0	0	2	1	0	X	4

Sheet B	1	2	3	4	5	6	7	8	9	10	Final
(Prince Edward Island) Suzanne Birt 🔨	0	0	1	0	0	2	1	0	3	0	7
(Manitoba) Mackenzie Zacharias	0	1	0	1	1	0	0	2	0	3	8

Sheet C	1	2	3	4	5	6	7	8	9	10	Final
(Ontario) Jestyn Murphy 🔨	0	2	0	1	0	0	2	0	0	X	5
(Ontario) Krista McCarville	0	0	1	0	2	2	0	1	1	X	7

Sheet D	1	2	3	4	5	6	7	8	9	10	Final
(Saskatchewan) Sherry Anderson 🔨	1	0	1	1	2	1	0	0	1	0	7
(Ontario) Hollie Duncan	0	2	0	0	0	0	2	1	0	1	6

==== Draw 2 ====
Monday, October 25, 9:00 pm

Sheet A	1	2	3	4	5	6	7	8	9	10	Final
(Manitoba) Darcy Robertson 🔨	1	0	0	1	0	1	0	0	X	X	3
(Ontario) Danielle Inglis	0	3	1	0	1	0	2	2	X	X	9

Sheet E	1	2	3	4	5	6	7	8	9	10	Final
(Saskatchewan) Penny Barker	0	0	0	0	2	0	1	0	0	X	3
(Ontario) Jacqueline Harrison 🔨	0	2	0	1	0	1	0	2	1	X	7

==== Draw 3 ====
Tuesday, October 26, 8:00 am

Sheet E	1	2	3	4	5	6	7	8	9	10	Final
(Northwest Territories) Kerry Galusha 🔨	1	0	1	0	1	0	1	0	2	X	6
(British Columbia) Corryn Brown	0	1	0	2	0	3	0	3	0	X	9

==== Draw 4 ====
Tuesday, October 26, 12:00 pm

Sheet A	1	2	3	4	5	6	7	8	9	10	Final
(Ontario) Jacqueline Harrison	0	1	0	1	3	0	0	0	2	0	7
(Ontario) Krista McCarville 🔨	0	0	2	0	0	2	1	2	0	1	8

Sheet B	1	2	3	4	5	6	7	8	9	10	Final
(Ontario) Hollie Duncan 🔨	5	0	0	1	0	2	0	1	0	X	9
(Ontario) Danielle Inglis	0	1	1	0	2	0	1	0	2	X	7

Sheet C	1	2	3	4	5	6	7	8	9	10	Final
(Saskatchewan) Penny Barker	0	1	0	3	1	2	0	3	X	X	10
(Manitoba) Beth Peterson 🔨	0	0	3	0	0	0	1	0	X	X	4

Sheet D	1	2	3	4	5	6	7	8	9	10	Final
(Manitoba) Darcy Robertson	0	1	2	0	1	0	0	1	0	3	8
(Nova Scotia) Jill Brothers 🔨	1	0	0	2	0	1	1	0	2	0	7

Sheet E	1	2	3	4	5	6	7	8	9	10	Final
(Prince Edward Island) Suzanne Birt	1	2	0	1	0	1	1	0	1	0	7
(Saskatchewan) Sherry Anderson 🔨	0	0	1	0	1	0	0	2	0	1	5

==== Draw 6 ====
Tuesday, October 26, 8:00 pm

Sheet A	1	2	3	4	5	6	7	8	9	10	Final
(Manitoba) Mackenzie Zacharias	0	1	0	0	1	1	0	0	2	0	5
(Manitoba) Darcy Robertson 🔨	2	0	1	1	0	0	1	1	0	2	8

Sheet B	1	2	3	4	5	6	7	8	9	10	Final
(British Columbia) Corryn Brown	0	1	0	2	0	4	1	0	3	X	11
(Ontario) Jestyn Murphy 🔨	0	0	1	0	1	0	0	3	0	X	5

Sheet D	1	2	3	4	5	6	7	8	9	10	Final
(Ontario) Danielle Inglis	0	0	2	0	1	1	0	0	X	X	4
(Prince Edward Island) Suzanne Birt 🔨	0	3	0	3	0	0	3	1	X	X	10

Sheet E	1	2	3	4	5	6	7	8	9	10	Final
(Nova Scotia) Jill Brothers 🔨	0	0	2	0	1	0	0	1	X	X	4
(Ontario) Hollie Duncan	4	2	0	1	0	1	3	0	X	X	11

==== Draw 7 ====
Wednesday, October 27, 8:00 am

Sheet D	1	2	3	4	5	6	7	8	9	10	Final
(Northwest Territories) Kerry Galusha 🔨	0	1	2	0	0	1	0	2	0	1	7
(Saskatchewan) Penny Barker	0	0	0	1	1	0	1	0	2	0	5

Sheet E	1	2	3	4	5	6	7	8	9	10	Final
(Ontario) Krista McCarville 🔨	1	0	1	0	0	4	0	1	5	X	12
(Manitoba) Beth Peterson	0	2	0	1	0	0	2	0	0	X	5

==== Draw 9 ====
Wednesday, October 27, 4:00 pm

Sheet A	1	2	3	4	5	6	7	8	9	10	11	Final
(Ontario) Jestyn Murphy 🔨	1	1	0	1	1	4	0	0	0	0	0	8
(Saskatchewan) Penny Barker	0	0	3	0	0	0	3	0	1	1	1	9

Sheet B	1	2	3	4	5	6	7	8	9	10	Final
(Saskatchewan) Sherry Anderson	1	0	0	1	0	1	1	0	3	X	7
(Manitoba) Darcy Robertson 🔨	0	1	1	0	1	0	0	1	0	X	4

Sheet C	1	2	3	4	5	6	7	8	9	10	Final
(Nova Scotia) Jill Brothers 🔨	0	0	0	3	0	0	1	0	0	X	4
(Prince Edward Island) Suzanne Birt	1	1	0	0	2	3	0	1	3	X	11

Sheet D	1	2	3	4	5	6	7	8	9	10	Final
(British Columbia) Corryn Brown 🔨	0	2	0	0	0	0	2	0	1	X	5
(Ontario) Jacqueline Harrison	1	0	1	1	0	3	0	3	0	X	9

Sheet E	1	2	3	4	5	6	7	8	9	10	Final
(Ontario) Hollie Duncan 🔨	0	0	2	0	2	0	1	0	1	X	6
(Manitoba) Mackenzie Zacharias	2	1	0	2	0	2	0	2	0	X	9

==== Draw 10 ====
Wednesday, October 27, 8:00 pm

Sheet B	1	2	3	4	5	6	7	8	9	10	Final
(Northwest Territories) Kerry Galusha	0	0	0	0	0	1	0	2	0	X	3
(Ontario) Krista McCarville 🔨	0	1	0	1	2	0	1	0	1	X	6

==== Draw 11 ====
Thursday, October 28, 8:00 am

Sheet C	1	2	3	4	5	6	7	8	9	10	Final
(Saskatchewan) Sherry Anderson	0	1	2	2	0	2	3	X	X	X	10
(Manitoba) Mackenzie Zacharias 🔨	1	0	0	0	1	0	0	X	X	X	2

Sheet E	1	2	3	4	5	6	7	8	9	10	Final
(Ontario) Danielle Inglis 🔨	0	4	1	0	2	0	0	3	X	X	10
(Nova Scotia) Jill Brothers	0	0	0	1	0	2	1	0	X	X	4

==== Draw 12 ====
Thursday, October 28, 12:00 pm

Sheet A	1	2	3	4	5	6	7	8	9	10	Final
(Manitoba) Beth Peterson 🔨	0	1	0	2	0	1	3	1	0	2	10
(Northwest Territories) Kerry Galusha	1	0	3	0	1	0	0	0	3	0	8

Sheet B	1	2	3	4	5	6	7	8	9	10	Final
(Saskatchewan) Penny Barker 🔨	2	0	0	2	0	0	3	1	2	X	10
(British Columbia) Corryn Brown	0	1	1	0	2	3	0	0	0	X	7

Sheet C	1	2	3	4	5	6	7	8	9	10	Final
(Ontario) Hollie Duncan	0	2	0	0	2	0	1	0	1	0	6
(Manitoba) Darcy Robertson 🔨	3	0	0	1	0	2	0	1	0	2	9

Sheet E	1	2	3	4	5	6	7	8	9	10	Final
(Ontario) Jacqueline Harrison 🔨	2	0	3	0	2	0	3	1	X	X	11
(Ontario) Jestyn Murphy	0	2	0	2	0	1	0	0	X	X	5

==== Draw 14 ====
Thursday, October 28, 8:00 pm

Sheet A	1	2	3	4	5	6	7	8	9	10	11	Final
(Nova Scotia) Jill Brothers 🔨	3	0	3	0	0	0	0	0	2	0	1	9
(Saskatchewan) Sherry Anderson	0	4	0	0	0	1	0	2	0	1	0	8

Sheet B	1	2	3	4	5	6	7	8	9	10	Final
(Manitoba) Darcy Robertson	0	0	0	1	1	0	1	1	0	0	4
(Prince Edward Island) Suzanne Birt 🔨	1	1	0	0	0	3	0	0	1	3	9

Sheet C	1	2	3	4	5	6	7	8	9	10	Final
(Ontario) Krista McCarville 🔨	1	0	1	0	1	0	2	1	1	0	7
(British Columbia) Corryn Brown	0	3	0	1	0	3	0	0	0	1	8

Sheet D	1	2	3	4	5	6	7	8	9	10	Final
(Manitoba) Mackenzie Zacharias 🔨	0	1	0	2	0	0	2	0	3	X	8
(Ontario) Danielle Inglis	0	0	1	0	0	1	0	2	0	X	4

==== Draw 15 ====
Friday, October 29, 8:00 am

Sheet B	1	2	3	4	5	6	7	8	9	10	Final
(Ontario) Jacqueline Harrison 🔨	3	1	0	0	0	2	1	0	2	X	9
(Northwest Territories) Kerry Galusha	0	0	2	1	1	0	0	2	0	X	6

Sheet D	1	2	3	4	5	6	7	8	9	10	11	Final
(Manitoba) Beth Peterson 🔨	0	3	0	0	1	0	0	3	0	1	0	8
(Ontario) Jestyn Murphy	1	0	0	2	0	2	1	0	2	0	2	10

==== Draw 16 ====
Friday, October 29, 12:00 pm

Sheet A	1	2	3	4	5	6	7	8	9	10	Final
(Prince Edward Island) Suzanne Birt 🔨	0	0	1	0	1	0	2	0	1	0	5
(Ontario) Hollie Duncan	0	1	0	2	0	1	0	1	0	1	6

Sheet C	1	2	3	4	5	6	7	8	9	10	Final
(Manitoba) Mackenzie Zacharias 🔨	0	2	0	0	0	1	0	0	0	3	6
(Nova Scotia) Jill Brothers	0	0	0	1	1	0	0	1	0	0	3

==== Draw 17 ====
Friday, October 29, 4:00 pm

Sheet A	1	2	3	4	5	6	7	8	9	10	Final
(Ontario) Krista McCarville	0	1	0	2	0	1	2	0	0	1	7
(Saskatchewan) Penny Barker 🔨	1	0	1	0	1	0	0	1	1	0	5

Sheet B	1	2	3	4	5	6	7	8	9	10	Final
(Ontario) Danielle Inglis 🔨	0	0	0	1	1	0	1	0	1	X	4
(Saskatchewan) Sherry Anderson	1	2	0	0	0	1	0	5	0	X	9

Sheet C	1	2	3	4	5	6	7	8	9	10	Final
(Manitoba) Beth Peterson 🔨	0	0	2	0	0	0	0	1	1	0	4
(Ontario) Jacqueline Harrison	0	1	0	2	0	1	1	0	0	3	8

Sheet E	1	2	3	4	5	6	7	8	9	10	Final
(Ontario) Jestyn Murphy	0	3	0	1	0	1	1	0	1	0	7
(Northwest Territories) Kerry Galusha 🔨	1	0	1	0	1	0	0	2	0	1	6

=== Playoffs ===
A Semifinals			A Final
A1	(Ontario) Krista McCarville	8
B2	(Manitoba) Mackenzie Zacharias	7	A1	(Ontario) Krista McCarville	9
B1	(Prince Edward Island) Suzanne Birt	4	A2	(Ontario) Jacqueline Harrison	6
A2	(Ontario) Jacqueline Harrison	8

B Quarterfinals			B Semifinal			B Final
A3	(British Columbia) Corryn Brown	10
B2	(Manitoba) Mackenzie Zacharias	3	A3	(British Columbia) Corryn Brown	8
B3	(Saskatchewan) Sherry Anderson	8	B3	(Saskatchewan) Sherry Anderson	5
B1	(Prince Edward Island) Suzanne Birt	6				A3	(British Columbia) Corryn Brown	2
						A2	(Ontario) Jacqueline Harrison	9

==== A Semifinals ====
Saturday, October 30, 1:30 pm

Sheet A	1	2	3	4	5	6	7	8	9	10	Final
(Prince Edward Island) Suzanne Birt 🔨	0	1	0	1	0	0	0	2	0	0	4
(Ontario) Jacqueline Harrison	0	0	1	0	2	0	1	0	2	2	8

Player percentages
(Prince Edward Island) Team Birt		(Ontario) Team Harrison	
Michelle McQuaid	79%	Laura Hickey	68%
Meaghan Hughes	74%	Lynn Kreviazuk	71%
Marie Christianson	78%	Allison Flaxey	64%
Suzanne Birt	75%	Jacqueline Harrison	85%
Total	76%	Total	72%

Sheet B	1	2	3	4	5	6	7	8	9	10	11	Final
(Ontario) Krista McCarville	0	0	0	0	1	0	1	1	0	4	1	8
(Manitoba) Mackenzie Zacharias 🔨	0	2	0	2	0	1	0	0	2	0	0	7

Player percentages
(Ontario) Team McCarville		(Manitoba) Team Zacharias	
Sarah Potts	80%	Lauren Lenentine	82%
Ashley Sippala	76%	Emily Zacharias	86%
Kendra Lilly	75%	Karlee Burgess	83%
Krista McCarville	75%	Mackenzie Zacharias	68%
Total	76%	Total	80%

==== A Final ====
Saturday, October 30, 7:00 pm

Sheet D	1	2	3	4	5	6	7	8	9	10	Final
(Ontario) Krista McCarville 🔨	1	0	2	2	1	0	0	2	1	X	9
(Ontario) Jacqueline Harrison	0	5	0	0	0	1	0	0	0	X	6

Player percentages
(Ontario) Team McCarville		(Ontario) Team Harrison	
Sarah Potts	93%	Laura Hickey	80%
Ashley Sippala	83%	Lynn Kreviazuk	78%
Kendra Lilly	71%	Allison Flaxey	84%
Krista McCarville	89%	Jacqueline Harrison	63%
Total	84%	Total	76%

Winner qualifies for 2021 Canadian Olympic Curling Trials.

Loser drops to B Final.

==== B Quarterfinals ====
Saturday, October 30, 7:00 pm

Sheet A	1	2	3	4	5	6	7	8	9	10	Final
(British Columbia) Corryn Brown 🔨	0	0	1	0	1	0	2	2	4	X	10
(Manitoba) Mackenzie Zacharias	0	1	0	1	0	1	0	0	0	X	3

Player percentages
(British Columbia) Team Brown		(Manitoba) Team Zacharias	
Samantha Fisher	79%	Lauren Lenentine	94%
Dezaray Hawes	76%	Emily Zacharias	75%
Erin Pincott	82%	Karlee Burgess	64%
Corryn Brown	86%	Mackenzie Zacharias	69%
Total	81%	Total	76%

Sheet C	1	2	3	4	5	6	7	8	9	10	Final
(Saskatchewan) Sherry Anderson 🔨	2	0	0	1	0	1	1	0	2	1	8
(Prince Edward Island) Suzanne Birt	0	2	1	0	2	0	0	1	0	0	6

Player percentages
(Saskatchewan) Team Anderson		(Prince Edward Island) Team Birt	
Breanne Knapp	86%	Michelle McQuaid	91%
Chaelynn Kitz	79%	Meaghan Hughes	88%
Nancy Martin	85%	Marie Christianson	84%
Sherry Anderson	78%	Suzanne Birt	80%
Total	82%	Total	86%

==== B Semifinal ====
Sunday, October 31, 9:00 am

Sheet E	1	2	3	4	5	6	7	8	9	10	Final
(British Columbia) Corryn Brown	0	1	0	2	0	3	1	1	0	X	8
(Saskatchewan) Sherry Anderson 🔨	2	0	1	0	0	0	0	0	2	X	5

Player percentages
(British Columbia) Team Brown		(Saskatchewan) Team Anderson	
Samantha Fisher	91%	Breanne Knapp	85%
Dezaray Hawes	84%	Chaelynn Kitz	80%
Erin Pincott	88%	Nancy Martin	74%
Corryn Brown	76%	Sherry Anderson	64%
Total	85%	Total	76%

==== B Final ====
Sunday, October 31, 2:00 pm

Sheet D	1	2	3	4	5	6	7	8	9	10	Final
(British Columbia) Corryn Brown	0	0	0	0	0	0	2	0	X	X	2
(Ontario) Jacqueline Harrison 🔨	0	2	1	1	1	2	0	2	X	X	9

Player percentages
(British Columbia) Team Brown		(Ontario) Team Harrison	
Samantha Fisher	84%	Laura Hickey	77%
Dezaray Hawes	70%	Lynn Kreviazuk	77%
Erin Pincott	64%	Allison Flaxey	83%
Corryn Brown	47%	Jacqueline Harrison	86%
Total	66%	Total	80%

Winner qualifies for 2021 Canadian Olympic Curling Trials.
