= 2016 Quebec Scotties Tournament of Hearts =

- Host city: Salaberry-de-Valleyfield, Quebec
- Arena: Arena Salaberry
- Dates: January 18–24, 2016
- Winner: Marie-France Larouche
- Curling club: CC Etchemin, Saint-Romuald
- Skip: Marie-France Larouche
- Third: Brenda Nicholls
- Second: Annie Lemay
- Lead: Julie Rainville
- Finalist: Lauren Mann

The 2016 Quebec Scotties Tournament of Hearts, the provincial women's curling championship of Quebec, was held from January 17 to 24 at Aréna Salaberry in Salaberry-de-Valleyfield, Quebec. The winning Marie-France Larouche rink will represent Quebec at the 2016 Scotties Tournament of Hearts. The event was held in conjunction with the 2016 Quebec Men's Provincial Curling Championship.

== Teams ==
The teams are listed as follows:

| Skip | Third | Second | Lead | Alternate | Coach | Club(s) |
|---|---|---|---|---|---|---|
| Camille Lapierre | Alanna Routledge | Alison Davies | Jill Routledge | Laura Wood | | Glenmore / Bel-aire |
| Marie-France Larouche | Brenda Nicholls | Annie Lemay | Julie Rainville | | Camil Larouche & Pierre Charette | Etchemin |
| Lauren Mann | Amélie Blais | Lana Gosselin | Brittany O'Rourke | | Guy Gosselin | Glenmore / Etchemin / Victoria |
| Hélène Pelchat | Laurie Lavoie | Gail Comeau | Sylvie Goulet | Sylvie Chiasson | | Valleyfield |
| Roxane Perron | Marie-Josée Fortier | Miriam Perron | Sonia Simard | | Michel St-Onge | Victoria / Laviolette / Trois-Rivières / Aurèle-Racine |

== Standings ==
Key
| Teams to Playoffs |

| Skip | W | L |
|---|---|---|
| Larouche | 6 | 2 |
| Mann | 5 | 3 |
| Perron | 4 | 4 |
| Lapierre | 3 | 5 |
| Pelchat | 2 | 6 |

== Scores ==
=== Draw 2 ===
Monday, January 18, 8:15 am

| Sheet A | 1 | 2 | 3 | 4 | 5 | 6 | 7 | 8 | 9 | 10 | Final |
|---|---|---|---|---|---|---|---|---|---|---|---|
| Roxane Perron | 0 | 2 | 0 | 0 | 1 | 0 | 1 | 1 | 0 | 0 | 5 |
| Camille Lapierre | 1 | 0 | 1 | 1 | 0 | 1 | 0 | 0 | 2 | 1 | 7 |

| Sheet B | 1 | 2 | 3 | 4 | 5 | 6 | 7 | 8 | 9 | 10 | Final |
|---|---|---|---|---|---|---|---|---|---|---|---|
| Lauren Mann | 0 | 0 | 2 | 0 | 1 | 4 | 0 | 5 | X | X | 12 |
| Hélène Pelchat | 1 | 0 | 0 | 1 | 0 | 0 | 2 | 0 | X | X | 4 |

=== Draw 4 ===
Monday, January 18, 15:45 am

| Sheet A | 1 | 2 | 3 | 4 | 5 | 6 | 7 | 8 | 9 | 10 | Final |
|---|---|---|---|---|---|---|---|---|---|---|---|
| Marie-France Larouche | 0 | 0 | 1 | 2 | 0 | 1 | 0 | 3 | 0 | 0 | 7 |
| Camille Lapierre | 0 | 2 | 0 | 0 | 2 | 0 | 2 | 0 | 1 | 1 | 8 |

| Sheet B | 1 | 2 | 3 | 4 | 5 | 6 | 7 | 8 | 9 | 10 | Final |
|---|---|---|---|---|---|---|---|---|---|---|---|
| Roxane Perron | 0 | 1 | 0 | 0 | 0 | 0 | 2 | 0 | 0 | X | 3 |
| Hélène Pelchat | 1 | 0 | 1 | 1 | 1 | 1 | 0 | 1 | 2 | X | 8 |

=== Draw 6 ===
Tuesday, January 18, 08:15 am

| Sheet A | 1 | 2 | 3 | 4 | 5 | 6 | 7 | 8 | 9 | 10 | Final |
|---|---|---|---|---|---|---|---|---|---|---|---|
| Lauren Mann | 0 | 3 | 0 | 1 | 0 | 2 | 0 | 1 | 0 | 1 | 8 |
| Camille Lapierre | 1 | 0 | 1 | 0 | 1 | 0 | 1 | 0 | 1 | 0 | 5 |

| Sheet B | 1 | 2 | 3 | 4 | 5 | 6 | 7 | 8 | 9 | 10 | Final |
|---|---|---|---|---|---|---|---|---|---|---|---|
| Marie-France Larouche | 3 | 0 | 3 | 0 | 0 | 1 | 0 | 0 | 0 | 0 | 7 |
| Roxane Perron | 0 | 1 | 0 | 2 | 1 | 0 | 0 | 2 | 1 | 2 | 9 |

=== Draw 8 ===
Tuesday, January 18, 15:45 pm

| Sheet A | 1 | 2 | 3 | 4 | 5 | 6 | 7 | 8 | 9 | 10 | Final |
|---|---|---|---|---|---|---|---|---|---|---|---|
| Lauren Mann | 0 | 1 | 0 | 0 | 0 | 1 | 1 | 0 | 3 | 0 | 6 |
| Roxane Perron | 1 | 0 | 2 | 1 | 1 | 0 | 0 | 3 | 0 | 1 | 9 |

| Sheet B | 1 | 2 | 3 | 4 | 5 | 6 | 7 | 8 | 9 | 10 | Final |
|---|---|---|---|---|---|---|---|---|---|---|---|
| Marie-France Larouche | 2 | 0 | 1 | 0 | 1 | 0 | 0 | 2 | 0 | 1 | 7 |
| Hélène Pelchat | 0 | 1 | 0 | 1 | 0 | 0 | 2 | 0 | 1 | 0 | 5 |

=== Draw 11 ===
Wednesday, January 19, 08:15 am

| Sheet A | 1 | 2 | 3 | 4 | 5 | 6 | 7 | 8 | 9 | 10 | Final |
|---|---|---|---|---|---|---|---|---|---|---|---|
| Marie-France Larouche | 2 | 0 | 2 | 0 | 1 | 2 | 0 | 1 | 0 | 1 | 9 |
| Lauren Mann | 0 | 2 | 0 | 1 | 0 | 0 | 2 | 0 | 2 | 0 | 7 |

| Sheet B | 1 | 2 | 3 | 4 | 5 | 6 | 7 | 8 | 9 | 10 | Final |
|---|---|---|---|---|---|---|---|---|---|---|---|
| Camille Lapierre | 1 | 0 | 2 | 0 | 2 | 0 | 0 | 1 | 0 | 5 | 11 |
| Hélène Pelchat | 0 | 1 | 0 | 1 | 0 | 1 | 1 | 0 | 3 | 0 | 6 |

=== Draw 13 ===
Wednesday, January 19, 19:30 pm

| Sheet B | 1 | 2 | 3 | 4 | 5 | 6 | 7 | 8 | 9 | 10 | Final |
|---|---|---|---|---|---|---|---|---|---|---|---|
| Roxane Perron | 0 | 1 | 0 | 2 | 3 | 0 | 0 | 0 | 2 | 1 | 9 |
| Camille Lapierre | 2 | 0 | 1 | 0 | 0 | 2 | 2 | 0 | 0 | 0 | 7 |

| Sheet B | 1 | 2 | 3 | 4 | 5 | 6 | 7 | 8 | 9 | 10 | Final |
|---|---|---|---|---|---|---|---|---|---|---|---|
| Lauren Mann | 1 | 0 | 2 | 0 | 2 | 0 | 4 | 1 | X | X | 10 |
| Hélène Pelchat | 0 | 1 | 0 | 1 | 0 | 1 | 0 | 0 | X | X | 3 |

=== Draw 14 ===
Thursday, January 18, 09:00 am

| Sheet B | 1 | 2 | 3 | 4 | 5 | 6 | 7 | 8 | 9 | 10 | Final |
|---|---|---|---|---|---|---|---|---|---|---|---|
| Roxane Perron | 0 | 1 | 0 | 0 | 0 | 0 | 2 | 0 | 0 | X | 3 |
| Hélène Pelchat | 2 | 0 | 1 | 0 | 0 | 0 | 1 | 0 | 1 | 0 | 5 |

| Sheet B | 1 | 2 | 3 | 4 | 5 | 6 | 7 | 8 | 9 | 10 | Final |
|---|---|---|---|---|---|---|---|---|---|---|---|
| Marie-France Larouche | 0 | 1 | 0 | 2 | 0 | 2 | 2 | 3 | X | X | 10 |
| Camille Lapierre | 1 | 0 | 2 | 0 | 1 | 0 | 0 | 0 | X | X | 4 |

=== Draw 16 ===
Thursday, January 18, 19:30 pm

| Sheet A | 1 | 2 | 3 | 4 | 5 | 6 | 7 | 8 | 9 | 10 | Final |
|---|---|---|---|---|---|---|---|---|---|---|---|
| Lauren Mann | 3 | 1 | 2 | 2 | 0 | X | X | X | X | X | 8 |
| Camille Lapierre | 0 | 0 | 0 | 0 | 1 | X | X | X | X | X | 1 |

| Sheet B | 1 | 2 | 3 | 4 | 5 | 6 | 7 | 8 | 9 | 10 | Final |
|---|---|---|---|---|---|---|---|---|---|---|---|
| Marie-France Larouche | 1 | 0 | 1 | 0 | 1 | 0 | 2 | 0 | 0 | 1 | 6 |
| Roxane Perron | 0 | 1 | 0 | 1 | 0 | 1 | 0 | 0 | 1 | 0 | 4 |

=== Draw 17 ===
Friday, January 22, 10:00 am

| Sheet A | 1 | 2 | 3 | 4 | 5 | 6 | 7 | 8 | 9 | 10 | Final |
|---|---|---|---|---|---|---|---|---|---|---|---|
| Marie-France Larouche | 0 | 1 | 1 | 2 | 4 | 1 | X | X | X | X | 9 |
| Hélène Pelchat | 1 | 0 | 0 | 0 | 0 | 0 | X | X | X | X | 1 |

| Sheet B | 1 | 2 | 3 | 4 | 5 | 6 | 7 | 8 | 9 | 10 | Final |
|---|---|---|---|---|---|---|---|---|---|---|---|
| Lauren Mann | 1 | 2 | 0 | 0 | 3 | 0 | 2 | 0 | 1 | 0 | 9 |
| Roxane Perron | 0 | 0 | 3 | 1 | 0 | 1 | 0 | 2 | 0 | 1 | 8 |

=== Draw 18 ===
Friday, January 22, 14:30 pm

| Sheet A | 1 | 2 | 3 | 4 | 5 | 6 | 7 | 8 | 9 | 10 | Final |
|---|---|---|---|---|---|---|---|---|---|---|---|
| Marie-France Larouche | 0 | 0 | 0 | 0 | 1 | 1 | 1 | 1 | 0 | 1 | 5 |
| Lauren Mann | 0 | 0 | 0 | 1 | 0 | 0 | 0 | 0 | 1 | 0 | 2 |

| Sheet B | 1 | 2 | 3 | 4 | 5 | 6 | 7 | 8 | 9 | 10 | 11 | Final |
|---|---|---|---|---|---|---|---|---|---|---|---|---|
| Camille Lapierre | 1 | 1 | 0 | 0 | 1 | 2 | 0 | 0 | 2 | 1 | 0 | 8 |
| Hélène Pelchat | 0 | 0 | 3 | 2 | 0 | 0 | 2 | 1 | 0 | 0 | 2 | 10 |

== Playoffs ==
| Semifinal | | | Final |
| | | | 1 | Marie-France Larouche | 8 |
| 2 | Lauren Mann | 8 | 2 | Lauren Mann | 5 |
| 3 | Roxane Perron | 7 |

=== Semifinal ===
Saturday, January 23, 7:30 pm

| Team | 1 | 2 | 3 | 4 | 5 | 6 | 7 | 8 | 9 | 10 | Final |
|---|---|---|---|---|---|---|---|---|---|---|---|
| Lauren Mann | 3 | 0 | 2 | 0 | 1 | 0 | 0 | 2 | 0 | 0 | 8 |
| Roxane Perron | 0 | 1 | 0 | 1 | 0 | 1 | 0 | 0 | 3 | 1 | 7 |

=== Final ===
Sunday, January 24, 12:00 pm

| Team | 1 | 2 | 3 | 4 | 5 | 6 | 7 | 8 | 9 | 10 | Final |
|---|---|---|---|---|---|---|---|---|---|---|---|
| Marie-France Larouche | 2 | 0 | 0 | 3 | 0 | 1 | 0 | 0 | 2 | X | 8 |
| Lauren Mann | 0 | 0 | 2 | 0 | 1 | 0 | 1 | 1 | 0 | X | 5 |

2016 Quebec Scotties Tournament of Hearts

Marie-France Larouche
7th Quebec Provincial Championship title
