= 2026 International Bernese Ladies Cup =

World Curling Tour event

- Host city: Bern, Switzerland
- Arena: Curling Bern
- Dates: January 30 – February 1
- Winner: (Switzerland) Team Tirinzoni
- Curling club: CC Aarau, Aarau
- Skip: Silvana Tirinzoni
- Fourth: Alina Pätz
- Second: Carole Howald
- Lead: Selina Witschonke
- Coach: Pierre Charette
- Finalist: (Sweden) Team Wranå

The 2026 International Bernese Ladies Cup was held from January 30 to February 1 at Curling Bern in Bern, Switzerland as part of the World Curling Tour. The event was held in a round-robin format with a purse of 20,000 CHF.

In a final tuneup for the 2026 Winter Olympics, Switzerland's Silvana Tirinzoni went undefeated to claim the event title for a second straight year, defeating Isabella Wranå's team skipped by Almida de Val 5–3 in the championship game. After a 4–0 round robin record, Team Tirinzoni beat Denmark's Madeleine Dupont in the quarterfinals before eliminating the Swiss junior rink skipped by Elodie Jerger in the semifinals. Meanwhile, Team Wranå finished 3–1 in the round robin before knocking off Germany's Sara Messenzehl and Switzerland's Xenia Schwaller in the quarters and semis respectively. Scotland's Fay Henderson and Switzerland's Corrie Hürlimann also qualified for the playoffs but lost in the quarterfinals. The only other Olympic team in the field was China's Wang Rui who missed the playoffs.

== Teams ==
The teams are listed as follows:

Skip	Third	Second	Lead	Alternate	Locale
Johanna Blackham	Isabelle Einspieler	Nuala Guex	Enya Caccivio	Anika Meier	Basel, Switzerland
Madeleine Dupont	Mathilde Halse	Jasmin Holtermann	Denise Dupont	My Larsen	Hvidovre, Denmark
Fay Henderson	Laura Watt	Hailey Duff	Katie McMillan	Lisa Davie	Stirling, Scotland
Corrie Hürlimann	Marina Lörtscher	Stefanie Berset	Celine Schwizgebel		Zug, Switzerland
Jana Hoffmann (Fourth)	Jana-Tamara Hählin	Renée Frigo	Elodie Jerger (Skip)		Flims, Switzerland
Michaela Baudyšová (Fourth)	Karolína Špundová (Note: Alternate Karolína Špundová spared for Anna Kubešková. She played third while third Michaela Baudyšová threw fourth stones. Klára Pařízková skipped the team.)	Aneta Müllerová	Klára Pařízková (Skip)		Prague, Czech Republic
Kim Sutor (Fourth)	Sara Messenzehl (Skip)	Zoé Antes	Joy Sutor		Füssen, Germany
Nadine Bärtschiger (Fourth)	Sarah Müller (Skip)	Melina Bezzola	Anna Gut		Lucerne, Switzerland
Verena Pflügler	Hannah Augustin	Johanna Höss	Teresa Treichl		Kitzbühel, Austria
Elodie Tschudi (Fourth)	Mathilde Rossi (Skip)	Norah Stotzer	Valentine Borgeat	Noémie Zufferey	Morges, Switzerland
Xenia Schwaller	Selina Gafner	Fabienne Rieder	Selina Rychiger		Zurich, Switzerland
Zoe Schwaller	Jana Soltermann	Anikò Székely	Ladina Ramstein		Limmattal, Switzerland
Alina Pätz (Fourth)	Silvana Tirinzoni (Skip)	Carole Howald	Selina Witschonke		Aarau, Switzerland
Wang Rui	Han Yu	Dong Ziqi	Jiang Jiayi	Su Tingyu	Beijing, China
Almida de Val	Moa Dryburgh (Note: Moa Dryburgh spared for Isabella Wranå who was preparing for the 2026 Winter Olympics. She played third while third Almida de Val moved up to skip.)	Maria Larsson	Linda Stenlund		Sundbyberg, Sweden
Dilşat Yıldız	Öznur Polat	İclal Karaman	Berfin Şengül	İfayet Şafak Çalıkuşu	Erzurum, Turkey

== Round robin standings ==
Final Round Robin Standings

Key
Teams to Playoffs

Pool A	W	L	PF	PA	SO
(Switzerland) Silvana Tirinzoni	4	0	27	9	4
(Germany) Sara Messenzehl	3	1	24	21	6
(Scotland) Fay Henderson	2	2	18	19	5
(Switzerland) Mathilde Rossi	0	4	12	26	14

Pool B	W	L	PF	PA	SO
(Switzerland) Xenia Schwaller	4	0	30	11	3
(Turkey) Dilşat Yıldız	2	2	22	22	11
(Switzerland) Johanna Blackham	1	3	14	32	10
(Czech Republic) Team Kubešková	1	3	17	23	13

Pool C	W	L	PF	PA	SO
(Switzerland) Corrie Hürlimann	4	0	32	13	7
(China) Wang Rui	2	2	22	18	8
(Switzerland) Sarah Müller	2	2	20	23	9
(Austria) Verena Pflügler	0	4	14	29	16

Pool D	W	L	PF	PA	SO
(Sweden) Team Wranå	3	1	22	14	12
(Switzerland) Elodie Jerger	2	2	16	16	1
(Denmark) Madeleine Dupont	2	2	20	20	2
(Switzerland) Zoe Schwaller	0	4	12	26	15

== Round robin results ==
All draw times listed in Central European Time (UTC+01:00).

=== Draw 1 ===
Friday, January 30, 9:30 am

Sheet 1	1	2	3	4	5	6	7	8	Final
(Scotland) Fay Henderson 🔨	1	0	0	0	1	1	1	0	4
(Germany) Sara Messenzehl	0	0	3	1	0	0	0	1	5

Sheet 2	1	2	3	4	5	6	7	8	Final
(Switzerland) Corrie Hürlimann	0	0	2	1	0	1	0	4	8
(Switzerland) Sarah Müller 🔨	1	1	0	0	2	0	1	0	5

Sheet 3	1	2	3	4	5	6	7	8	Final
(Switzerland) Xenia Schwaller 🔨	1	0	3	0	4	2	X	X	10
(Switzerland) Johanna Blackham	0	1	0	1	0	0	X	X	2

Sheet 4	1	2	3	4	5	6	7	8	Final
(China) Wang Rui 🔨	2	2	0	3	1	0	X	X	8
(Austria) Verena Pflügler	0	0	1	0	0	2	X	X	3

Sheet 5	1	2	3	4	5	6	7	8	Final
(Turkey) Dilşat Yıldız 🔨	0	1	1	1	0	1	0	2	6
(Czech Republic) Team Kubešková	0	0	0	0	3	0	1	0	4

Sheet 6	1	2	3	4	5	6	7	8	Final
(Switzerland) Silvana Tirinzoni 🔨	2	1	0	1	1	0	3	X	8
(Switzerland) Mathilde Rossi	0	0	1	0	0	1	0	X	2

=== Draw 2 ===
Friday, January 30, 2:30 pm

Sheet 3	1	2	3	4	5	6	7	8	Final
(Sweden) Team Wranå	0	0	1	0	3	0	0	1	5
(Switzerland) Elodie Jerger 🔨	0	1	0	1	0	1	0	0	3

Sheet 4	1	2	3	4	5	6	7	8	Final
(Czech Republic) Team Kubešková 🔨	0	2	1	0	2	1	0	X	6
(Switzerland) Johanna Blackham	0	0	0	1	0	0	2	X	3

Sheet 5	1	2	3	4	5	6	7	8	Final
(Germany) Sara Messenzehl 🔨	0	1	0	3	0	2	0	1	7
(Switzerland) Mathilde Rossi	0	0	1	0	2	0	1	0	4

Sheet 6	1	2	3	4	5	6	7	8	Final
(Denmark) Madeleine Dupont 🔨	0	1	0	1	0	1	1	2	6
(Switzerland) Zoe Schwaller	1	0	0	0	1	0	0	0	2

Sheet 7	1	2	3	4	5	6	7	8	Final
(Switzerland) Silvana Tirinzoni 🔨	2	1	1	0	1	1	X	X	6
(Scotland) Fay Henderson	0	0	0	1	0	0	X	X	1

Sheet 8	1	2	3	4	5	6	7	8	Final
(Switzerland) Xenia Schwaller 🔨	2	0	1	0	1	0	1	2	7
(Turkey) Dilşat Yıldız	0	1	0	1	0	1	0	0	3

=== Draw 3 ===
Friday, January 30, 7:30 pm

Sheet 1	1	2	3	4	5	6	7	8	Final
(China) Wang Rui	0	0	3	0	0	1	0	0	4
(Switzerland) Corrie Hürlimann 🔨	0	1	0	1	0	0	4	1	7

Sheet 2	1	2	3	4	5	6	7	8	Final
(Sweden) Team Wranå	0	2	0	4	0	2	X	X	8
(Denmark) Madeleine Dupont 🔨	1	0	1	0	1	0	X	X	3

Sheet 3	1	2	3	4	5	6	7	8	Final
(Switzerland) Silvana Tirinzoni	0	2	1	1	0	0	5	X	9
(Germany) Sara Messenzehl 🔨	1	0	0	0	1	1	0	X	3

Sheet 4	1	2	3	4	5	6	7	8	Final
(Switzerland) Zoe Schwaller	0	0	1	0	1	0	0	X	2
(Switzerland) Elodie Jerger 🔨	1	0	0	2	0	1	1	X	5

Sheet 5	1	2	3	4	5	6	7	8	Final
(Switzerland) Sarah Müller 🔨	2	0	0	1	0	1	0	2	6
(Austria) Verena Pflügler	0	1	0	0	2	0	1	0	4

Sheet 6	1	2	3	4	5	6	7	8	Final
(Scotland) Fay Henderson	3	1	0	0	2	0	0	X	6
(Switzerland) Mathilde Rossi 🔨	0	0	1	1	0	2	1	X	5

=== Draw 4 ===
Saturday, January 31, 9:30 am

Sheet 3	1	2	3	4	5	6	7	8	Final
(China) Wang Rui 🔨	0	1	0	1	0	1	3	X	6
(Switzerland) Sarah Müller	0	0	2	0	0	0	0	X	2

Sheet 4	1	2	3	4	5	6	7	8	Final
(Switzerland) Corrie Hürlimann 🔨	2	0	0	1	3	0	2	X	8
(Austria) Verena Pflügler	0	0	1	0	0	1	0	X	2

Sheet 5	1	2	3	4	5	6	7	8	Final
(Sweden) Team Wranå 🔨	2	0	0	0	0	3	0	1	6
(Switzerland) Zoe Schwaller	0	2	0	0	1	0	1	0	4

Sheet 6	1	2	3	4	5	6	7	8	Final
(Switzerland) Xenia Schwaller 🔨	2	0	0	1	1	1	2	X	7
(Czech Republic) Team Kubešková	0	2	0	0	0	0	0	X	2

Sheet 7	1	2	3	4	5	6	7	8	Final
(Turkey) Dilşat Yıldız	0	2	1	1	2	5	X	X	11
(Switzerland) Johanna Blackham 🔨	2	0	0	0	0	0	X	X	2

Sheet 8	1	2	3	4	5	6	7	8	Final
(Denmark) Madeleine Dupont 🔨	1	3	1	0	3	0	X	X	8
(Switzerland) Elodie Jerger	0	0	0	2	0	1	X	X	3

=== Draw 5 ===
Saturday, January 31, 2:30 pm

Sheet 1	1	2	3	4	5	6	7	8	9	Final
(Switzerland) Johanna Blackham 🔨	0	2	1	0	0	1	0	1	2	7
(Austria) Verena Pflügler	1	0	0	3	0	0	1	0	0	5

Sheet 2	1	2	3	4	5	6	7	8	Final
(Switzerland) Mathilde Rossi	0	0	0	1	0	0	0	X	1
(Switzerland) Elodie Jerger 🔨	0	0	0	0	1	1	3	X	5

Sheet 3	1	2	3	4	5	6	7	8	Final
(Scotland) Fay Henderson	0	3	0	1	0	3	X	X	7
(Denmark) Madeleine Dupont 🔨	1	0	2	0	0	0	X	X	3

Sheet 4	1	2	3	4	5	6	7	8	Final
(Switzerland) Silvana Tirinzoni	0	0	2	1	0	1	0	X	4
(Sweden) Team Wranå 🔨	1	0	0	0	1	0	1	X	3

Sheet 5	1	2	3	4	5	6	7	8	Final
(Switzerland) Xenia Schwaller 🔨	2	0	2	0	0	2	0	X	6
(China) Wang Rui	0	1	0	1	1	0	1	X	4

Sheet 6	1	2	3	4	5	6	7	8	Final
(Turkey) Dilşat Yıldız	0	0	2	0	0	X	X	X	2
(Switzerland) Corrie Hürlimann 🔨	0	3	0	2	4	X	X	X	9

Sheet 7	1	2	3	4	5	6	7	8	Final
(Germany) Sara Messenzehl	3	0	3	0	3	X	X	X	9
(Switzerland) Zoe Schwaller 🔨	0	2	0	2	0	X	X	X	4

Sheet 8	1	2	3	4	5	6	7	8	Final
(Czech Republic) Team Kubešková	0	2	1	1	0	0	1	0	5
(Switzerland) Sarah Müller 🔨	4	0	0	0	1	1	0	1	7

== Playoffs ==
Quarterfinals
1	(Switzerland) Xenia Schwaller	5
8	(Scotland) Fay Henderson	3
4	(Germany) Sara Messenzehl	5
5	(Sweden) Team Wranå	8
3	(Switzerland) Corrie Hürlimann	6
6	(Switzerland) Elodie Jerger	7
2	(Switzerland) Silvana Tirinzoni	7
7	(Denmark) Madeleine Dupont	3

Semifinals
1	(Switzerland) Xenia Schwaller	4
5	(Sweden) Team Wranå	5
6	(Switzerland) Elodie Jerger	3
2	(Switzerland) Silvana Tirinzoni	7

Final
5	(Sweden) Team Wranå	3
2	(Switzerland) Silvana Tirinzoni	5

=== Quarterfinals ===
Saturday, January 31, 7:30 pm

Sheet 3	1	2	3	4	5	6	7	8	Final
(Switzerland) Corrie Hürlimann 🔨	4	0	1	0	0	0	1	0	6
(Switzerland) Elodie Jerger	0	2	0	1	1	1	0	2	7

Sheet 4	1	2	3	4	5	6	7	8	Final
(Germany) Sara Messenzehl 🔨	0	2	0	2	0	1	0	X	5
(Sweden) Team Wranå	1	0	3	0	2	0	2	X	8

Sheet 5	1	2	3	4	5	6	7	8	Final
(Switzerland) Xenia Schwaller 🔨	1	0	2	1	0	0	0	1	5
(Scotland) Fay Henderson	0	1	0	0	1	0	1	0	3

Sheet 6	1	2	3	4	5	6	7	8	Final
(Switzerland) Silvana Tirinzoni 🔨	2	0	0	2	1	0	2	X	7
(Denmark) Madeleine Dupont	0	1	0	0	0	2	0	X	3

=== Semifinals ===
Sunday, February 1, 9:00 am

Sheet 4	1	2	3	4	5	6	7	8	Final
(Switzerland) Elodie Jerger	0	1	0	1	0	1	X	X	3
(Switzerland) Silvana Tirinzoni 🔨	3	0	2	0	2	0	X	X	7

Sheet 6	1	2	3	4	5	6	7	8	Final
(Switzerland) Xenia Schwaller 🔨	1	0	0	2	0	1	0	0	4
(Sweden) Team Wranå	0	2	0	0	1	0	0	2	5

=== Final ===
Sunday, February 1, 1:30 pm

Sheet 5	1	2	3	4	5	6	7	8	Final
(Sweden) Team Wranå	0	0	0	0	2	0	1	X	3
(Switzerland) Silvana Tirinzoni 🔨	0	2	0	1	0	2	0	X	5
