= 2022 Swiss Women's Curling Championship =

- Host city: Thônex, Switzerland
- Arena: Trois-Chêne CC
- Dates: February 19–26
- Winner: (Aargau) Team Tirinzoni
- Curling club: CC Aarau, Aarau
- Skip: Silvana Tirinzoni
- Fourth: Alina Pätz
- Second: Esther Neuenschwander
- Lead: Melanie Barbezat
- Alternate: Marlene Albrecht
- Finalist: (Grisons) Raphaela Keiser

The 2022 Swiss Women's Curling Championship, the national women's curling championship for Switzerland is being held from February 19 to February 26 in Thônex at the Trois-Chêne curling club. Team Tirinzoni are the defending champions and are returning from a fourth-place finish at the 2022 Olympics. There are seven teams competing to represent Switzerland at the 2022 World Women's Curling Championship.

The event, due to team Tirinzoni's participation at the olympics, was a six-team single round-robin tournament with three teams qualifying for the playoffs and team Tirizoni as the fourth team in the playoffs. The playoffs teams qualified for a single round-robin tournament for seeding purposed for the playoffs. The playoffs consist of best-of-one semi finals, a best-of-one third place game, and a best-of-three championship round. Teams Tirinzoni defeated team Keiser in 2–1 in a best of three final.

== Teams ==
These are the teams participating in the event:

Club	Skip	Third	Second	Lead	Alternate	Locale
CC St. Moritz	Selina Witschonke (Fourth)	Elena Mathis	Raphaela Keiser (Skip)	Marina Lörtscher	Binia Feltscher-Beeli	(Grisons) St. Moritz
CC Langenthal	Irene Schori	Lara Stocker	Celine Schwitzgebel	Stefanie Berset	Carole Howald	(Canton of Bern) Langenthal
CC Aarau	Alina Pätz (Fourth)	Silvana Tirinzoni (Skip)	Esther Neuenschwander	Melanie Barbezat		(Aargau) Aarau
Grasshopper Club Zürich	Xenia Schwaller	Malin Da Ros	Marion Wüest	Selina Gafner	Sarah Müller	(Canton of Zurich) Zürich
Zug Gemperle AG	Briar Hürlimann (Fourth)	Corrie Hürlimann (Skip)	Melina Chiara Bezzola	Anna Gut		(Canton of Zug) Hünenberg
Wetzikon Abplanalp AG	Ladina Müller (Fourth)	Nora Wüest (Skip)	Anna Stern	Kari Winter	Lisa Gugler	(Canton of Zurich) Oetwil am See
CC Interlaken-Bern	Fabienne Rieder	Tina Zürcher	Laurane Jenni-Fluckiger	Selina Rychiger		(Canton of Bern) Interlaken

== Round-robin standings ==
Round-robin standings at end of round:

Key
Teams to Playoffs

Skip	W	L
(Grisons) Raphaela Keiser (St. Moritz)	4	1
(Canton of Zug) Corrie Hürlimann (Hünenberg)	3	2
(Canton of Zurich) Xenia Schwaller (Zurich)	3	2
(Canton of Zurich) Irene Schori (Otweil am See)	2	3
(Canton of Bern) Nora Wüest (Langenthal)	2	3
(Canton of Bern) Fabienne Rieder (Interlaken)	1	4

== Round-robin results ==
All draw times are listed in Central European Time (UTC+01:00).

=== Draw 1 ===
Sunday, February 20, 8:00 am

Sheet 2	1	2	3	4	5	6	7	8	9	10	11	Final
(Canton of Zurich) Xenia Schwaller 🔨	1	0	0	1	0	4	0	2	0	0	1	9
(Canton of Bern) Nora Wüest	0	0	2	0	1	0	1	0	2	2	0	8

Sheet 3	1	2	3	4	5	6	7	8	9	10	Final
(Canton of Bern) Fabienne Rieder 🔨	0	0	0	0	0	1	1	X	X	X	2
(Canton of Zurich) Irene Schori	0	2	1	3	2	0	0	X	X	X	8

Sheet 4	1	2	3	4	5	6	7	8	9	10	Final
(Grisons) Raphaela Keiser 🔨	0	0	1	0	0	1	0	2	1	0	5
(Canton of Zug) Corrie Hürlimann	1	0	0	4	1	0	1	0	0	1	8

=== Draw 2 ===
Sunday, February 20, 4:15 pm

Sheet 3	1	2	3	4	5	6	7	8	9	10	Final
(Canton of Zug) Corrie Hürlimann	0	0	2	0	1	0	1	0	0	X	4
(Canton of Zurich) Xenia Schwaller 🔨	0	1	0	4	0	1	0	2	1	X	9

Sheet 4	1	2	3	4	5	6	7	8	9	10	11	Final
(Canton of Bern) Fabienne Rieder 🔨	0	1	0	0	0	0	1	1	1	0	1	5
(Canton of Bern) Nora Wüest	0	0	0	1	1	1	0	0	0	1	0	4

Sheet 5	1	2	3	4	5	6	7	8	9	10	Final
(Canton of Zurich) Irene Schori	0	0	0	2	0	0	2	0	0	X	4
(Grisons) Raphaela Keiser 🔨	0	0	2	0	0	2	0	2	2	X	8

=== Draw 3 ===
Monday, February 21, 9:00 am

Sheet 2	1	2	3	4	5	6	7	8	9	10	11	Final
(Canton of Zurich) Irene Schori	0	2	0	0	0	2	0	0	0	2	0	6
(Canton of Zug) Corrie Hürlimann 🔨	1	0	0	2	0	0	1	1	1	0	2	8

Sheet 3	1	2	3	4	5	6	7	8	9	10	Final
(Grisons) Raphaela Keiser 🔨	0	2	1	0	3	0	1	0	2	X	9
(Canton of Bern) Nora Wüest	0	0	0	1	0	1	0	2	0	X	4

Sheet 5	1	2	3	4	5	6	7	8	9	10	Final
(Canton of Zurich) Xenia Schwaller 🔨	1	0	1	0	2	1	3	1	0	1	10
(Canton of Bern) Fabienne Rieder	0	3	0	4	0	0	0	0	2	0	9

=== Draw 4 ===
Monday, February 21, 7:00 pm

Sheet 2	1	2	3	4	5	6	7	8	9	10	Final
(Canton of Bern) Fabienne Rieder 🔨	0	1	0	0	0	2	0	2	0	X	5
(Grisons) Raphaela Keiser	1	0	2	1	2	0	1	0	3	X	10

Sheet 4	1	2	3	4	5	6	7	8	9	10	Final
(Canton of Zurich) Irene Schori 🔨	2	0	0	0	2	2	0	0	0	2	8
(Canton of Zurich) Xenia Schwaller	0	0	0	2	0	0	1	1	2	0	6

Sheet 5	1	2	3	4	5	6	7	8	9	10	Final
(Canton of Bern) Nora Wüest	0	2	0	1	0	1	0	3	0	X	7
(Canton of Zug) Corrie Hürlimann 🔨	1	0	2	0	0	0	1	0	0	X	4

=== Draw 5 ===
Tuesday, February 22, 2:00 pm

Sheet 2	1	2	3	4	5	6	7	8	9	10	Final
(Canton of Bern) Nora Wüest 🔨	1	0	2	3	0	2	0	1	0	2	11
(Canton of Zurich) Irene Schori	0	3	0	0	4	0	1	0	2	0	10

Sheet 3	1	2	3	4	5	6	7	8	9	10	Final
(Canton of Zurich) Xenia Schwaller	0	0	1	0	0	1	0	1	0	X	3
(Grisons) Raphaela Keiser 🔨	2	0	0	0	0	0	2	0	1	X	5

Sheet 4	1	2	3	4	5	6	7	8	9	10	Final
(Canton of Zug) Corrie Hürlimann 🔨	1	0	2	1	0	4	1	0	X	X	9
(Canton of Bern) Fabienne Rieder	0	1	0	0	1	0	0	1	X	X	3

== Seeding round robin standings ==
Round-robin standings at end of round:

Skip	W	L
(Canton of Zug) Corrie Hürlimann (Hünenberg)	2	1
(Grisons) Raphaela Keiser (St. Moritz)	2	1
(Aargau) Silvana Tirinzoni (Aarau)	2	1
(Canton of Zurich) Xenia Schwaller (Zurich)	0	3

== Seeding round robin results ==
All draw times are listed in Central European Time (UTC+01:00).

=== Draw 6 ===
Wednesday, February 23, 8:00 pm

Sheet 2	1	2	3	4	5	6	7	8	9	10	Final
(Canton of Zurich) Xenia Schwaller 🔨	1	0	0	1	0	0	0	1	0	X	3
(Aargau) Silvana Tirinzoni	0	0	2	0	2	1	1	0	2	X	8

Sheet 4	1	2	3	4	5	6	7	8	9	10	Final
(Canton of Zug) Corrie Hürlimann	0	0	1	0	1	0	0	0	1	X	3
(Grisons) Raphaela Keiser 🔨	0	1	0	1	0	1	1	1	0	X	5

=== Draw 7 ===
Thursday, February 24, 1:00 pm

Sheet 3	1	2	3	4	5	6	7	8	9	10	Final
(Aargau) Silvana Tirinzoni	0	0	1	0	1	0	3	0	2	0	7
(Canton of Zug) Corrie Hürlimann 🔨	0	1	0	3	0	2	0	2	0	4	12

Sheet 5	1	2	3	4	5	6	7	8	9	10	Final
(Canton of Zurich) Xenia Schwaller 🔨	1	0	0	0	0	1	0	X	X	X	2
(Grisons) Raphaela Keiser	0	4	1	1	2	0	2	X	X	X	10

=== Draw 8 ===
Thursday, February 24, 7:00 pm

Sheet 2	1	2	3	4	5	6	7	8	9	10	11	Final
(Canton of Zug) Corrie Hürlimann 🔨	0	0	2	0	3	0	0	2	1	0	1	9
(Canton of Zurich) Xenia Schwaller	0	0	0	3	0	3	1	0	0	1	0	8

Sheet 4	1	2	3	4	5	6	7	8	9	10	Final
(Grisons) Raphaela Keiser 🔨	0	0	1	0	3	0	1	1	0	0	6
(Aargau) Silvana Tirinzoni	0	1	0	2	0	1	0	0	1	3	8
