= 2024 Oslo Cup =

- Host city: Oslo, Norway
- Arena: Snarøya Curling Club
- Dates: August 29 – September 1
- Men's winner: (Switzerland) Team Hösli
- Curling club: CC Glarus, Glarus
- Skip: Marco Hösli
- Fourth: Philipp Hösli
- Second: Simon Gloor
- Lead: Justin Hausherr
- Finalist: (Sweden) Niklas Edin
- Women's winner: (Sweden) Team Hasselborg
- Curling club: Sundbybergs CK, Sundbyberg
- Skip: Anna Hasselborg
- Third: Sara McManus
- Second: Agnes Knochenhauer
- Lead: Sofia Mabergs
- Alternate: Johanna Heldin
- Coach: Kristian Lindström
- Finalist: (Switzerland) Xenia Schwaller

The 2024 Oslo Cup was held from August 29 to September 1 at the Snarøya Curling Club in Oslo, Norway. The event was held in a round robin format with a purse of NOK 112,000 on the men's side and NOK 88,000 on the women's side. It was the first event of the 2024–25 Nordic Curling Tour.

== Men ==
=== Teams ===
The teams are listed as follows:

| Skip | Third | Second | Lead | Alternate | Locale |
|---|---|---|---|---|---|
| Kjetil Bjørke | Tor Fredriksen | Håvard Lundhaug | Lasse Vinje | | Bygdøy, Norway |
| Michael Brunner | Anthony Petoud | Romano Meier | Andreas Gerlach | | Bern, Switzerland |
| Cameron Bryce | Duncan Menzies | Luke Carson | Robin McCall | | Kelso, Scotland |
| Jordan Chandler | Landan Rooney | Connor Lawes | Robert Currie | Evan Lilly | (Canada) Little Current, Ontario |
| Niklas Edin | Oskar Eriksson | Rasmus Wranå | Christoffer Sundgren | | Karlstad, Sweden |
| Andreas Hårstad | Mathias Brænden | Michael Mellemseter | Willhelm Næss | Emil M. Kvål | Oppdal, Norway |
| Philipp Hösli (Fourth) | Marco Hösli (Skip) | Simon Gloor | Justin Hausherr | | Glarus, Switzerland |
| Lukas Høstmælingen | Tinius Haslev Nordbye | Magnus Lillebø | Grunde Buraas | | Oslo, Norway |
| Marco Hefti (Fourth) | Jan Iseli (Skip) | Max Winz | Sandro Fanchini | | Solothurn, Switzerland |
| Lukáš Klíma | Marek Černovský | Martin Jurík | Lukáš Klípa | Radek Boháč | Prague, Czech Republic |
| Axel Landelius | Alexander Palm | Johan Engqvist | Alfons Johansson | | Mjölby, Sweden |
| Markus Dale (Fourth) | Anders Mjøen (Skip) | Emil Sæther | Jonathan Got | | Oppdal, Norway |
| Marc Muskatewitz | Benny Kapp | Felix Messenzehl | Johannes Scheuerl | Mario Trevisiol | Füssen, Germany |
| Fredrik Nyman | Patric Mabergs | Simon Olofsson | Johannes Patz | | Sollefteå, Sweden |
| P. N. Raju | Girithar Anthay Suthakaran | Kishan Vasant | Vinay Goenka | Sudheer Reddy | Hyderabad, India |
| Magnus Ramsfjell | Martin Sesaker | Bendik Ramsfjell | Gaute Nepstad | | Trondheim, Norway |
| John Shuster | Chris Plys | Colin Hufman | John Landsteiner | Matt Hamilton | (United States) Duluth, Minnesota |
| Yves Stocker | Kim Schwaller | Felix Eberhard | Tom Winkelhausen | | Zug, Switzerland |
| Sixten Totzek | Joshua Sutor | Jan-Luca Häg | Magnus Sutor | | Füssen, Germany |

=== Round robin standings ===
Final Round Robin Standings

Key
| Teams to Playoffs |

| Pool A | W | L | PF | PA | DSC |
|---|---|---|---|---|---|
| (Sweden) Niklas Edin | 3 | 0 | 15 | 12 | 54 |
| (Switzerland) Yves Stocker | 2 | 1 | 22 | 14 | 159 |
| (Canada) Jordan Chandler | 1 | 2 | 15 | 13 | 252 |
| (Germany) Sixten Totzek | 0 | 3 | 9 | 22 | 37 |

| Pool B | W | L | PF | PA | DSC |
|---|---|---|---|---|---|
| (Germany) Marc Muskatewitz | 4 | 0 | 29 | 13 | 90 |
| (Sweden) Fredrik Nyman | 3 | 1 | 21 | 16 | 2 |
| (United States) John Shuster | 2 | 2 | 24 | 16 | 106 |
| (Switzerland) Jan Iseli | 1 | 3 | 14 | 24 | 77 |
| (Norway) Kjetil Bjørke | 0 | 4 | 11 | 30 | 113 |

| Pool C | W | L | PF | PA | DSC |
|---|---|---|---|---|---|
| (Switzerland) Marco Hösli | 4 | 0 | 23 | 9 | 3 |
| (Norway) Lukas Høstmælingen | 2 | 2 | 17 | 22 | 18 |
| (Switzerland) Michael Brunner | 2 | 2 | 24 | 17 | 74 |
| (Sweden) Axel Landelius | 1 | 3 | 16 | 20 | 71 |
| (Norway) Anders Mjøen | 1 | 3 | 11 | 23 | 72 |

| Pool D | W | L | PF | PA | DSC |
|---|---|---|---|---|---|
| (Norway) Magnus Ramsfjell | 3 | 1 | 27 | 16 | 5 |
| (Czech Republic) Lukáš Klíma | 3 | 1 | 24 | 12 | 31 |
| (Norway) Andreas Hårstad | 2 | 2 | 22 | 19 | 32 |
| (Scotland) Cameron Bryce | 2 | 2 | 24 | 24 | 37 |
| (India) P. N. Raju | 0 | 4 | 9 | 35 | 200 |

=== Round robin results ===
All draw times are listed in Central European Summer Time (UTC+02:00).

==== Draw 1 ====
Thursday, August 29, 3:15 pm

| Sheet E | 1 | 2 | 3 | 4 | 5 | 6 | 7 | 8 | Final |
| (Norway) Anders Mjøen | 0 | 0 | 1 | 0 | 1 | X | X | X | 2 |
| (Switzerland) Michael Brunner | 1 | 4 | 0 | 2 | 0 | X | X | X | 7 |

| Sheet F | 1 | 2 | 3 | 4 | 5 | 6 | 7 | 8 | Final |
| (Sweden) Axel Landelius | 0 | 0 | 0 | 0 | 0 | 0 | 1 | X | 1 |
| (Switzerland) Marco Hösli | 0 | 1 | 0 | 1 | 0 | 0 | 0 | X | 2 |

==== Draw 2 ====
Thursday, August 29, 3:30 pm

| Sheet A | 1 | 2 | 3 | 4 | 5 | 6 | 7 | 8 | Final |
| (Canada) Jordan Chandler | 0 | 2 | 0 | 0 | 1 | 0 | 0 | X | 3 |
| (Switzerland) Yves Stocker | 1 | 0 | 0 | 2 | 0 | 2 | 2 | X | 7 |

| Sheet C | 1 | 2 | 3 | 4 | 5 | 6 | 7 | 8 | Final |
| (United States) John Shuster | 2 | 0 | 0 | 3 | 3 | 0 | X | X | 8 |
| (Norway) Kjetil Bjørke | 0 | 0 | 1 | 0 | 0 | 1 | X | X | 2 |

| Sheet D | 1 | 2 | 3 | 4 | 5 | 6 | 7 | 8 | Final |
| (Germany) Marc Muskatewitz | 1 | 0 | 4 | 0 | 3 | X | X | X | 8 |
| (Switzerland) Jan Iseli | 0 | 2 | 0 | 1 | 0 | X | X | X | 3 |

==== Draw 5 ====
Thursday, August 29, 9:15 pm

| Sheet E | 1 | 2 | 3 | 4 | 5 | 6 | 7 | 8 | Final |
| (Sweden) Fredrik Nyman | 2 | 0 | 0 | 1 | 1 | 0 | 2 | X | 6 |
| (United States) John Shuster | 0 | 2 | 0 | 0 | 0 | 1 | 0 | X | 3 |

| Sheet F | 1 | 2 | 3 | 4 | 5 | 6 | 7 | 8 | Final |
| (Czech Republic) Lukáš Klíma | 0 | 0 | 0 | 0 | 2 | 0 | 1 | 1 | 4 |
| (Norway) Magnus Ramsfjell | 0 | 0 | 0 | 1 | 0 | 1 | 0 | 0 | 2 |

==== Draw 6 ====
Thursday, August 29, 9:30 pm

| Sheet A | 1 | 2 | 3 | 4 | 5 | 6 | 7 | 8 | Final |
| (Scotland) Cameron Bryce | 0 | 0 | 2 | 2 | 0 | 2 | 0 | X | 6 |
| (India) P. N. Raju | 1 | 1 | 0 | 0 | 2 | 0 | 1 | X | 5 |

| Sheet B | 1 | 2 | 3 | 4 | 5 | 6 | 7 | 8 | Final |
| (Norway) Kjetil Bjørke | 0 | 0 | 0 | 1 | 0 | X | X | X | 1 |
| (Switzerland) Jan Iseli | 3 | 1 | 0 | 0 | 4 | X | X | X | 8 |

| Sheet C | 1 | 2 | 3 | 4 | 5 | 6 | 7 | 8 | Final |
| (Germany) Sixten Totzek | 0 | 1 | 0 | 1 | 0 | 0 | 1 | 0 | 3 |
| (Sweden) Niklas Edin | 1 | 0 | 1 | 0 | 0 | 1 | 0 | 1 | 4 |

==== Draw 9 ====
Friday, August 30, 11:15 am

| Sheet A | 1 | 2 | 3 | 4 | 5 | 6 | 7 | 8 | Final |
| (Norway) Lukas Høstmælingen | 0 | 2 | 3 | 0 | 0 | 1 | 0 | X | 6 |
| (Switzerland) Michael Brunner | 0 | 0 | 0 | 1 | 2 | 0 | 2 | X | 5 |

| Sheet B | 1 | 2 | 3 | 4 | 5 | 6 | 7 | 8 | Final |
| (Norway) Anders Mjøen | 0 | 2 | 1 | 0 | 1 | 0 | 2 | X | 6 |
| (Sweden) Axel Landelius | 1 | 0 | 0 | 2 | 0 | 1 | 0 | X | 4 |

| Sheet C | 1 | 2 | 3 | 4 | 5 | 6 | 7 | 8 | Final |
| (Norway) Andreas Hårstad | 1 | 0 | 0 | 2 | 0 | 1 | 0 | 2 | 6 |
| (Scotland) Cameron Bryce | 0 | 2 | 0 | 0 | 2 | 0 | 1 | 0 | 5 |

| Sheet D | 1 | 2 | 3 | 4 | 5 | 6 | 7 | 8 | Final |
| (India) P. N. Raju | 0 | 0 | 0 | 0 | 0 | X | X | X | 0 |
| (Czech Republic) Lukáš Klíma | 4 | 2 | 1 | 2 | 1 | X | X | X | 10 |

==== Draw 10 ====
Friday, August 30, 11:45 am

| Sheet E | 1 | 2 | 3 | 4 | 5 | 6 | 7 | 8 | Final |
| (Sweden) Niklas Edin | 2 | 0 | 2 | 0 | 0 | 0 | 1 | 0 | 5 |
| (Canada) Jordan Chandler | 0 | 2 | 0 | 1 | 0 | 0 | 0 | 1 | 4 |

| Sheet F | 1 | 2 | 3 | 4 | 5 | 6 | 7 | 8 | Final |
| (Switzerland) Yves Stocker | 0 | 1 | 1 | 2 | 0 | 2 | 0 | 4 | 10 |
| (Germany) Sixten Totzek | 3 | 0 | 0 | 0 | 1 | 0 | 1 | 0 | 5 |

==== Draw 11 ====
Friday, August 30, 1:30 pm

| Sheet B | 1 | 2 | 3 | 4 | 5 | 6 | 7 | 8 | Final |
| (Sweden) Fredrik Nyman | 0 | 0 | 1 | 0 | 1 | 0 | 0 | X | 2 |
| (Germany) Marc Muskatewitz | 0 | 0 | 0 | 2 | 0 | 4 | 0 | X | 6 |

==== Draw 12 ====
Friday, August 30, 2:00 pm

| Sheet F | 1 | 2 | 3 | 4 | 5 | 6 | 7 | 8 | Final |
| (Switzerland) Jan Iseli | 0 | 0 | 1 | 0 | X | X | X | X | 1 |
| (United States) John Shuster | 1 | 4 | 0 | 3 | X | X | X | X | 8 |

==== Draw 13 ====
Friday, August 30, 4:15 pm

| Sheet B | 1 | 2 | 3 | 4 | 5 | 6 | 7 | 8 | Final |
| (Switzerland) Marco Hösli | 0 | 2 | 0 | 2 | 1 | 2 | 1 | X | 8 |
| (Norway) Lukas Høstmælingen | 1 | 0 | 3 | 0 | 0 | 0 | 0 | X | 4 |

| Sheet D | 1 | 2 | 3 | 4 | 5 | 6 | 7 | 8 | Final |
| (Sweden) Axel Landelius | 0 | 2 | 0 | 1 | 0 | 0 | 0 | X | 3 |
| (Switzerland) Michael Brunner | 1 | 0 | 2 | 0 | 2 | 1 | 4 | X | 10 |

==== Draw 14 ====
Friday, August 30, 4:45 pm

| Sheet E | 1 | 2 | 3 | 4 | 5 | 6 | 7 | 8 | Final |
| (Norway) Magnus Ramsfjell | 2 | 2 | 0 | 1 | 2 | 0 | X | X | 7 |
| (Norway) Andreas Hårstad | 0 | 0 | 2 | 0 | 0 | 1 | X | X | 3 |

| Sheet F | 1 | 2 | 3 | 4 | 5 | 6 | 7 | 8 | Final |
| (Czech Republic) Lukáš Klíma | 1 | 0 | 0 | 0 | 1 | 2 | 1 | 0 | 5 |
| (Scotland) Cameron Bryce | 0 | 3 | 2 | 0 | 0 | 0 | 0 | 1 | 6 |

==== Draw 15 ====
Friday, August 30, 6:30 pm

| Sheet A | 1 | 2 | 3 | 4 | 5 | 6 | 7 | 8 | 9 | Final |
| (Norway) Kjetil Bjørke | 1 | 0 | 1 | 0 | 1 | 0 | 0 | 2 | 0 | 5 |
| (Sweden) Fredrik Nyman | 0 | 1 | 0 | 1 | 0 | 1 | 2 | 0 | 1 | 6 |

| Sheet C | 1 | 2 | 3 | 4 | 5 | 6 | 7 | 8 | Final |
| (Sweden) Niklas Edin | 1 | 0 | 0 | 1 | 0 | 2 | 2 | 0 | 6 |
| (Switzerland) Yves Stocker | 0 | 1 | 0 | 0 | 3 | 0 | 0 | 1 | 5 |

| Sheet D | 1 | 2 | 3 | 4 | 5 | 6 | 7 | 8 | Final |
| (United States) John Shuster | 0 | 1 | 0 | 2 | 0 | 0 | 2 | 0 | 5 |
| (Germany) Marc Muskatewitz | 1 | 0 | 1 | 0 | 3 | 1 | 0 | 1 | 7 |

==== Draw 17 ====
Saturday, August 31, 9:00 am

| Sheet A | 1 | 2 | 3 | 4 | 5 | 6 | 7 | 8 | Final |
| (Switzerland) Michael Brunner | 0 | 1 | 0 | 0 | 1 | 0 | 0 | X | 2 |
| (Switzerland) Marco Hösli | 1 | 0 | 2 | 2 | 0 | 0 | 1 | X | 6 |

| Sheet B | 1 | 2 | 3 | 4 | 5 | 6 | 7 | 8 | Final |
| (Norway) Lukas Høstmælingen | 1 | 3 | 1 | 0 | 0 | X | X | X | 5 |
| (Norway) Anders Mjøen | 0 | 0 | 0 | 0 | 1 | X | X | X | 1 |

| Sheet C | 1 | 2 | 3 | 4 | 5 | 6 | 7 | 8 | Final |
| (India) P. N. Raju | 1 | 0 | 0 | 1 | 0 | X | X | X | 2 |
| (Norway) Andreas Hårstad | 0 | 4 | 1 | 0 | 4 | X | X | X | 9 |

| Sheet D | 1 | 2 | 3 | 4 | 5 | 6 | 7 | 8 | Final |
| (Scotland) Cameron Bryce | 2 | 0 | 0 | 2 | 0 | 3 | 0 | 0 | 7 |
| (Norway) Magnus Ramsfjell | 0 | 1 | 1 | 0 | 1 | 0 | 3 | 2 | 8 |

==== Draw 20 ====
Saturday, August 31, 2:15 pm

| Sheet E | 1 | 2 | 3 | 4 | 5 | 6 | 7 | 8 | 9 | Final |
| (Norway) Andreas Hårstad | 0 | 2 | 1 | 0 | 0 | 1 | 0 | 0 | 0 | 4 |
| (Czech Republic) Lukáš Klíma | 0 | 0 | 0 | 0 | 1 | 0 | 2 | 1 | 1 | 5 |

| Sheet F | 1 | 2 | 3 | 4 | 5 | 6 | 7 | 8 | Final |
| (Norway) Magnus Ramsfjell | 2 | 0 | 4 | 0 | 4 | X | X | X | 10 |
| (India) P. N. Raju | 0 | 1 | 0 | 1 | 0 | X | X | X | 2 |

==== Draw 21 ====
Saturday, August 31, 2:30 pm

| Sheet B | 1 | 2 | 3 | 4 | 5 | 6 | 7 | 8 | Final |
| (Germany) Sixten Totzek | 0 | 0 | 0 | 1 | 0 | X | X | X | 1 |
| (Canada) Jordan Chandler | 4 | 0 | 1 | 0 | 3 | X | X | X | 8 |

| Sheet C | 1 | 2 | 3 | 4 | 5 | 6 | 7 | 8 | Final |
| (Germany) Marc Muskatewitz | 0 | 5 | 0 | 3 | 0 | X | X | X | 8 |
| (Norway) Kjetil Bjørke | 1 | 0 | 1 | 0 | 1 | X | X | X | 3 |

| Sheet D | 1 | 2 | 3 | 4 | 5 | 6 | 7 | 8 | Final |
| (Switzerland) Jan Iseli | 0 | 0 | 1 | 0 | 1 | 0 | 0 | X | 2 |
| (Sweden) Fredrik Nyman | 0 | 1 | 0 | 3 | 0 | 1 | 2 | X | 7 |

==== Draw 22 ====
Saturday, August 31, 4:30 pm

| Sheet F | 1 | 2 | 3 | 4 | 5 | 6 | 7 | 8 | Final |
| (Norway) Lukas Høstmælingen | 0 | 1 | 0 | 0 | 0 | 1 | 0 | X | 2 |
| (Sweden) Axel Landelius | 1 | 0 | 0 | 0 | 2 | 0 | 5 | X | 8 |

==== Draw 23 ====
Saturday, August 31, 5:00 pm

| Sheet E | 1 | 2 | 3 | 4 | 5 | 6 | 7 | 8 | Final |
| (Switzerland) Marco Hösli | 3 | 1 | 0 | 3 | 0 | X | X | X | 7 |
| (Norway) Anders Mjøen | 0 | 0 | 1 | 0 | 1 | X | X | X | 2 |

=== Playoffs ===
Quarterfinals
1 | (Switzerland) Marco Hösli | 6
8 | (Norway) Lukas Høstmælingen | 5
4 | (Sweden) Fredrik Nyman | 10
5 | (Norway) Magnus Ramsfjell | 5
2 | (Sweden) Niklas Edin | 6
7 | (Switzerland) Yves Stocker | 2
3 | (Germany) Marc Muskatewitz | 7
6 | (Czech Republic) Lukáš Klíma | 1

Semifinals
1 | (Switzerland) Marco Hösli | 7
4 | (Sweden) Fredrik Nyman | 5
2 | (Sweden) Niklas Edin | 5
3 | (Germany) Marc Muskatewitz | 4

Final
1 | (Switzerland) Marco Hösli | 6
2 | (Sweden) Niklas Edin | 5

==== Quarterfinals ====
Sunday, September 1, 9:00 am

| Sheet A | 1 | 2 | 3 | 4 | 5 | 6 | 7 | 8 | Final |
| (Germany) Marc Muskatewitz | 0 | 1 | 0 | 1 | 0 | 5 | X | X | 7 |
| (Czech Republic) Lukáš Klíma | 0 | 0 | 1 | 0 | 0 | 0 | X | X | 1 |

| Sheet B | 1 | 2 | 3 | 4 | 5 | 6 | 7 | 8 | Final |
| (Sweden) Niklas Edin | 1 | 0 | 0 | 2 | 1 | 0 | 2 | X | 6 |
| (Switzerland) Yves Stocker | 0 | 0 | 1 | 0 | 0 | 1 | 0 | X | 2 |

| Sheet C | 1 | 2 | 3 | 4 | 5 | 6 | 7 | 8 | Final |
| (Switzerland) Marco Hösli | 0 | 3 | 0 | 1 | 0 | 2 | 0 | 0 | 6 |
| (Norway) Lukas Høstmælingen | 0 | 0 | 1 | 0 | 1 | 0 | 2 | 1 | 5 |

| Sheet D | 1 | 2 | 3 | 4 | 5 | 6 | 7 | 8 | Final |
| (Sweden) Fredrik Nyman | 3 | 0 | 5 | 0 | 0 | 2 | X | X | 10 |
| (Norway) Magnus Ramsfjell | 0 | 3 | 0 | 1 | 1 | 0 | X | X | 5 |

==== Semifinals ====
Sunday, September 1, 12:00 pm

| Sheet B | 1 | 2 | 3 | 4 | 5 | 6 | 7 | 8 | Final |
| (Switzerland) Marco Hösli | 0 | 0 | 0 | 2 | 3 | 0 | 2 | 0 | 7 |
| (Sweden) Fredrik Nyman | 0 | 0 | 3 | 0 | 0 | 1 | 0 | 1 | 5 |

| Sheet D | 1 | 2 | 3 | 4 | 5 | 6 | 7 | 8 | Final |
| (Sweden) Niklas Edin | 1 | 0 | 1 | 0 | 3 | 0 | 0 | 0 | 5 |
| (Germany) Marc Muskatewitz | 0 | 1 | 0 | 1 | 0 | 1 | 0 | 1 | 4 |

==== Final ====
Sunday, September 1, 3:00 pm

| Sheet C | 1 | 2 | 3 | 4 | 5 | 6 | 7 | 8 | Final |
| (Switzerland) Marco Hösli | 0 | 2 | 0 | 1 | 0 | 1 | 0 | 2 | 6 |
| (Sweden) Niklas Edin | 1 | 0 | 1 | 0 | 2 | 0 | 1 | 0 | 5 |

== Women ==
=== Teams ===
The teams are listed as follows:

| Skip | Third | Second | Lead | Alternate | Locale |
|---|---|---|---|---|---|
| Torild Bjørnstad | Nora Østgård | Ingeborg Forbregd | Eirin Mesloe | | Oppdal, Norway |
| Moa Dryburgh | Thea Orefjord | Moa Tjärnlund | Moa Nilsson | Maja Roxin | Sundbyberg, Sweden |
| Madeleine Dupont | Mathilde Halse | Denise Dupont | My Larsen | Jasmin Holtermann | Hvidovre, Denmark |
| Anna Hasselborg | Sara McManus | Agnes Knochenhauer | Sofia Mabergs | Johanna Heldin | Sundbyberg, Sweden |
| Corrie Hürlimann | Celine Schwizgebel | Sarah Müller | Marina Lörtscher | Stefanie Berset | Zug, Switzerland |
| Zuzana Paulová (Note: Zuzana Paulová spared for Anna Kubešková.) | Alžběta Zelingrová | Michaela Baudyšová | Aneta Müllerová | Karolína Špundová | Prague, Czech Republic |
| Virginija Paulauskaitė | Olga Dvojeglazova | Rūta Blažienė | Miglė Kiudytė | Justina Zalieckienė | Vilnius, Lithuania |
| Kristin Skaslien (Fourth) | Marianne Rørvik (Skip) | Mille Haslev Nordbye | Eilin Kjærland | | Lillehammer, Norway |
| Xenia Schwaller | Selina Gafner | Fabienne Rieder | Selina Rychiger | | Zurich, Switzerland |
| Erika Tuvike (Fourth) | Kerli Laidsalu | Liisa Turmann (Skip) | Heili Grossmann | | Tallinn, Estonia |
| Isabella Wranå | Almida de Val | Maria Larsson | Linda Stenlund | | Sundbyberg, Sweden |
| Dilşat Yıldız | Öznur Polat | İfayet Şafak Çalıkuşu | Berfin Şengül | İclal Karaman | Erzurum, Turkey |

=== Round robin standings ===
Final Round Robin Standings

Key
| Teams to Playoffs |

| Pool A | W | L | PF | PA | DSC |
|---|---|---|---|---|---|
| (Sweden) Anna Hasselborg | 5 | 0 | 34 | 15 | 99.1 |
| (Norway) Marianne Rørvik | 4 | 1 | 36 | 17 | 64.0 |
| (Sweden) Moa Dryburgh | 3 | 2 | 24 | 24 | 40.0 |
| (Czech Republic) Team Kubešková | 2 | 3 | 32 | 25 | 141.0 |
| (Switzerland) Corrie Hürlimann | 1 | 4 | 16 | 29 | 15.8 |
| (Lithuania) Virginija Paulauskaitė | 0 | 5 | 15 | 47 | 197.4 |

| Pool B | W | L | PF | PA | DSC |
|---|---|---|---|---|---|
| (Switzerland) Xenia Schwaller | 4 | 1 | 33 | 29 | 59.9 |
| (Turkey) Dilşat Yıldız | 3 | 2 | 26 | 31 | 146.9 |
| (Denmark) Madeleine Dupont | 3 | 2 | 32 | 27 | 156.4 |
| (Norway) Torild Bjørnstad | 3 | 2 | 31 | 21 | 211.3 |
| (Sweden) Isabella Wranå | 2 | 3 | 31 | 24 | 59.8 |
| (Estonia) Liisa Turmann | 0 | 5 | 12 | 33 | 270.1 |

=== Round robin results ===
All draw times are listed in Central European Summer Time (UTC+02:00).

==== Draw 3 ====
Thursday, August 29, 6:15 pm

| Sheet E | 1 | 2 | 3 | 4 | 5 | 6 | 7 | 8 | 9 | Final |
| (Switzerland) Xenia Schwaller | 2 | 0 | 0 | 0 | 4 | 0 | 1 | 0 | 1 | 8 |
| (Norway) Torild Bjørnstad | 0 | 2 | 0 | 1 | 0 | 2 | 0 | 2 | 0 | 7 |

| Sheet F | 1 | 2 | 3 | 4 | 5 | 6 | 7 | 8 | Final |
| (Denmark) Madeleine Dupont | 2 | 0 | 0 | 0 | 2 | 0 | 2 | 0 | 6 |
| (Turkey) Dilşat Yıldız | 0 | 2 | 1 | 1 | 0 | 2 | 0 | 1 | 7 |

==== Draw 4 ====
Thursday, August 29, 6:30 pm

| Sheet A | 1 | 2 | 3 | 4 | 5 | 6 | 7 | 8 | Final |
| (Lithuania) Virginija Paulauskaitė | 1 | 0 | 0 | 2 | 0 | 0 | 0 | X | 3 |
| (Sweden) Anna Hasselborg | 0 | 3 | 1 | 0 | 2 | 3 | 1 | X | 10 |

| Sheet B | 1 | 2 | 3 | 4 | 5 | 6 | 7 | 8 | 9 | Final |
| (Norway) Marianne Rørvik | 0 | 0 | 0 | 4 | 0 | 1 | 0 | 1 | 1 | 7 |
| (Czech Republic) Team Kubešková | 0 | 1 | 1 | 0 | 1 | 0 | 3 | 0 | 0 | 6 |

| Sheet C | 1 | 2 | 3 | 4 | 5 | 6 | 7 | 8 | Final |
| (Switzerland) Corrie Hürlimann | 1 | 0 | 1 | 1 | 0 | 0 | 0 | X | 3 |
| (Sweden) Moa Dryburgh | 0 | 2 | 0 | 0 | 2 | 0 | 2 | X | 6 |

| Sheet D | 1 | 2 | 3 | 4 | 5 | 6 | 7 | 8 | Final |
| (Estonia) Liisa Turmann | 0 | 0 | 0 | 0 | 0 | X | X | X | 0 |
| (Sweden) Isabella Wranå | 4 | 0 | 0 | 2 | 4 | X | X | X | 10 |

==== Draw 7 ====
Friday, August 30, 8:30 am

| Sheet A | 1 | 2 | 3 | 4 | 5 | 6 | 7 | 8 | Final |
| (Sweden) Isabella Wranå | 1 | 0 | 1 | 0 | 2 | 0 | 1 | 0 | 5 |
| (Denmark) Madeleine Dupont | 0 | 1 | 0 | 3 | 0 | 1 | 0 | 1 | 6 |

| Sheet B | 1 | 2 | 3 | 4 | 5 | 6 | 7 | 8 | Final |
| (Norway) Torild Bjørnstad | 0 | 0 | 0 | 1 | 1 | 0 | 2 | X | 4 |
| (Estonia) Liisa Turmann | 0 | 0 | 0 | 0 | 0 | 1 | 0 | X | 1 |

| Sheet C | 1 | 2 | 3 | 4 | 5 | 6 | 7 | 8 | Final |
| (Czech Republic) Team Kubešková | 3 | 2 | 0 | 1 | 4 | 2 | X | X | 12 |
| (Lithuania) Virginija Paulauskaitė | 0 | 0 | 2 | 0 | 0 | 0 | X | X | 2 |

| Sheet D | 1 | 2 | 3 | 4 | 5 | 6 | 7 | 8 | Final |
| (Turkey) Dilşat Yıldız | 0 | 0 | 2 | 2 | 0 | 0 | 0 | 0 | 4 |
| (Switzerland) Xenia Schwaller | 1 | 0 | 0 | 0 | 2 | 1 | 0 | 1 | 5 |

==== Draw 8 ====
Friday, August 30, 9:00 am

| Sheet E | 1 | 2 | 3 | 4 | 5 | 6 | 7 | 8 | Final |
| (Sweden) Moa Dryburgh | 0 | 0 | 2 | 1 | 0 | 0 | 0 | X | 3 |
| (Norway) Marianne Rørvik | 2 | 1 | 0 | 0 | 0 | 1 | 4 | X | 8 |

| Sheet F | 1 | 2 | 3 | 4 | 5 | 6 | 7 | 8 | Final |
| (Sweden) Anna Hasselborg | 0 | 1 | 0 | 1 | 1 | 1 | 0 | 1 | 5 |
| (Switzerland) Corrie Hürlimann | 2 | 0 | 1 | 0 | 0 | 0 | 0 | 0 | 3 |

==== Draw 11 ====
Friday, August 30, 1:30 pm

| Sheet A | 1 | 2 | 3 | 4 | 5 | 6 | 7 | 8 | Final |
| (Lithuania) Virginija Paulauskaitė | 0 | 2 | 0 | 1 | 0 | 1 | X | X | 4 |
| (Sweden) Moa Dryburgh | 3 | 0 | 3 | 0 | 4 | 0 | X | X | 10 |

| Sheet C | 1 | 2 | 3 | 4 | 5 | 6 | 7 | 8 | Final |
| (Norway) Marianne Rørvik | 4 | 4 | 1 | X | X | X | X | X | 9 |
| (Switzerland) Corrie Hürlimann | 0 | 0 | 0 | X | X | X | X | X | 0 |

| Sheet D | 1 | 2 | 3 | 4 | 5 | 6 | 7 | 8 | Final |
| (Czech Republic) Team Kubešková | 0 | 0 | 4 | 0 | 0 | 1 | 0 | X | 5 |
| (Sweden) Anna Hasselborg | 3 | 1 | 0 | 1 | 2 | 0 | 1 | X | 8 |

==== Draw 12 ====
Friday, August 30, 2:00 pm

| Sheet E | 1 | 2 | 3 | 4 | 5 | 6 | 7 | 8 | Final |
| (Norway) Torild Bjørnstad | 0 | 2 | 0 | 0 | 2 | X | X | X | 4 |
| (Sweden) Isabella Wranå | 2 | 0 | 0 | 1 | 0 | X | X | X | 3 |

==== Draw 13 ====
Friday, August 30, 4:15 pm

| Sheet A | 1 | 2 | 3 | 4 | 5 | 6 | 7 | 8 | Final |
| (Estonia) Liisa Turmann | 0 | 0 | 2 | 1 | 0 | 2 | 0 | 0 | 5 |
| (Turkey) Dilşat Yıldız | 2 | 1 | 0 | 0 | 1 | 0 | 2 | 1 | 7 |

| Sheet C | 1 | 2 | 3 | 4 | 5 | 6 | 7 | 8 | Final |
| (Switzerland) Xenia Schwaller | 3 | 0 | 0 | 1 | 0 | 1 | 0 | 2 | 7 |
| (Denmark) Madeleine Dupont | 0 | 1 | 2 | 0 | 1 | 0 | 2 | 0 | 6 |

==== Draw 16 ====
Friday, August 30, 9:00 pm

| Sheet A | 1 | 2 | 3 | 4 | 5 | 6 | 7 | 8 | Final |
| (Switzerland) Xenia Schwaller | 0 | 1 | 0 | 1 | 0 | 2 | 2 | X | 6 |
| (Estonia) Liisa Turmann | 1 | 0 | 1 | 0 | 2 | 0 | 0 | X | 4 |

| Sheet B | 1 | 2 | 3 | 4 | 5 | 6 | 7 | 8 | Final |
| (Denmark) Madeleine Dupont | 0 | 0 | 3 | 0 | 0 | 2 | 0 | 3 | 8 |
| (Norway) Torild Bjørnstad | 1 | 1 | 0 | 1 | 0 | 0 | 3 | 0 | 6 |

| Sheet C | 1 | 2 | 3 | 4 | 5 | 6 | 7 | 8 | Final |
| (Turkey) Dilşat Yıldız | 0 | 0 | 2 | 0 | 2 | 0 | 0 | 3 | 7 |
| (Sweden) Isabella Wranå | 0 | 1 | 0 | 0 | 0 | 1 | 3 | 0 | 5 |

| Sheet D | 1 | 2 | 3 | 4 | 5 | 6 | 7 | 8 | Final |
| (Norway) Marianne Rørvik | 2 | 0 | 2 | 3 | 0 | 2 | X | X | 9 |
| (Lithuania) Virginija Paulauskaitė | 0 | 1 | 0 | 0 | 2 | 0 | X | X | 3 |

| Sheet E | 1 | 2 | 3 | 4 | 5 | 6 | 7 | 8 | Final |
| (Switzerland) Corrie Hürlimann | 0 | 1 | 0 | 0 | 0 | 2 | 1 | 0 | 4 |
| (Czech Republic) Team Kubešková | 3 | 0 | 1 | 0 | 1 | 0 | 0 | 1 | 6 |

| Sheet F | 1 | 2 | 3 | 4 | 5 | 6 | 7 | 8 | Final |
| (Sweden) Anna Hasselborg | 1 | 1 | 2 | 2 | 0 | X | X | X | 6 |
| (Sweden) Moa Dryburgh | 0 | 0 | 0 | 0 | 1 | X | X | X | 1 |

==== Draw 18 ====
Saturday, August 31, 11:30 am

| Sheet E | 1 | 2 | 3 | 4 | 5 | 6 | 7 | 8 | Final |
| (Denmark) Madeleine Dupont | 0 | 1 | 0 | 1 | 0 | 3 | 1 | X | 6 |
| (Estonia) Liisa Turmann | 1 | 0 | 1 | 0 | 0 | 0 | 0 | X | 2 |

| Sheet F | 1 | 2 | 3 | 4 | 5 | 6 | 7 | 8 | Final |
| (Sweden) Isabella Wranå | 0 | 2 | 0 | 1 | 1 | 1 | 0 | 3 | 8 |
| (Switzerland) Xenia Schwaller | 3 | 0 | 2 | 0 | 0 | 0 | 2 | 0 | 7 |

==== Draw 19 ====
Saturday, August 31, 11:45 am

| Sheet A | 1 | 2 | 3 | 4 | 5 | 6 | 7 | 8 | Final |
| (Sweden) Anna Hasselborg | 0 | 2 | 0 | 0 | 1 | 1 | 0 | 1 | 5 |
| (Norway) Marianne Rørvik | 0 | 0 | 1 | 1 | 0 | 0 | 1 | 0 | 3 |

| Sheet B | 1 | 2 | 3 | 4 | 5 | 6 | 7 | 8 | Final |
| (Switzerland) Corrie Hürlimann | 0 | 1 | 0 | 2 | 0 | 2 | 1 | X | 6 |
| (Lithuania) Virginija Paulauskaitė | 0 | 0 | 2 | 0 | 1 | 0 | 0 | X | 3 |

| Sheet C | 1 | 2 | 3 | 4 | 5 | 6 | 7 | 8 | Final |
| (Sweden) Moa Dryburgh | 0 | 1 | 0 | 0 | 2 | 1 | 0 | X | 4 |
| (Czech Republic) Team Kubešková | 0 | 0 | 1 | 1 | 0 | 0 | 1 | X | 3 |

| Sheet D | 1 | 2 | 3 | 4 | 5 | 6 | 7 | 8 | Final |
| (Turkey) Dilşat Yıldız | 0 | 1 | 0 | 0 | X | X | X | X | 1 |
| (Norway) Torild Bjørnstad | 2 | 0 | 6 | 2 | X | X | X | X | 10 |

=== Playoffs ===
Quarterfinals
4 | (Sweden) Moa Dryburgh | 4
5 | (Turkey) Dilşat Yıldız | 5
3 | (Norway) Marianne Rørvik | 0
6 | (Denmark) Madeleine Dupont | 6

Semifinals
1 | (Sweden) Anna Hasselborg | 7
6 | (Denmark) Madeleine Dupont | 0
2 | (Switzerland) Xenia Schwaller | 6
5 | (Turkey) Dilşat Yıldız | 3

Final
1 | (Sweden) Anna Hasselborg | 8
2 | (Switzerland) Xenia Schwaller | 3

==== Quarterfinals ====
Saturday, August 31, 5:00 pm

| Sheet B | 1 | 2 | 3 | 4 | 5 | 6 | 7 | 8 | Final |
| (Norway) Marianne Rørvik | 0 | 0 | 0 | 0 | 0 | X | X | X | 0 |
| (Denmark) Madeleine Dupont | 0 | 0 | 2 | 1 | 3 | X | X | X | 6 |

| Sheet C | 1 | 2 | 3 | 4 | 5 | 6 | 7 | 8 | Final |
| (Sweden) Moa Dryburgh | 1 | 0 | 0 | 0 | 2 | 0 | 1 | X | 4 |
| (Turkey) Dilşat Yıldız | 0 | 2 | 0 | 3 | 0 | 0 | 0 | X | 5 |

==== Semifinals ====
Sunday, September 1, 12:00 pm

| Sheet A | 1 | 2 | 3 | 4 | 5 | 6 | 7 | 8 | Final |
| (Sweden) Anna Hasselborg | 2 | 1 | 0 | 0 | 4 | X | X | X | 7 |
| (Denmark) Madeleine Dupont | 0 | 0 | 0 | 0 | 0 | X | X | X | 0 |

| Sheet C | 1 | 2 | 3 | 4 | 5 | 6 | 7 | 8 | Final |
| (Switzerland) Xenia Schwaller | 1 | 0 | 2 | 0 | 2 | 0 | 1 | X | 6 |
| (Turkey) Dilşat Yıldız | 0 | 1 | 0 | 1 | 0 | 1 | 0 | X | 3 |

==== Final ====
Sunday, September 1, 3:00 pm

| Sheet B | 1 | 2 | 3 | 4 | 5 | 6 | 7 | 8 | Final |
| (Sweden) Anna Hasselborg | 0 | 1 | 0 | 3 | 0 | 1 | 0 | 3 | 8 |
| (Switzerland) Xenia Schwaller | 0 | 0 | 1 | 0 | 2 | 0 | 0 | 0 | 3 |
