= 2025 AMJ Campbell Shorty Jenkins Classic =

- Host city: Cornwall, Ontario
- Arena: Cornwall Curling Centre
- Dates: September 10–14
- Men's winner: (Ontario) Team Epping
- Curling club: Northern Credit Union CC, Sudbury
- Skip: John Epping
- Third: Jake Horgan
- Second: Tanner Horgan
- Lead: Ian McMillan
- Finalist: (Switzerland) Yannick Schwaller
- Women's winner: (Switzerland) Team Schwaller
- Curling club: GC Zurich, Zurich
- Skip: Xenia Schwaller
- Third: Selina Gafner
- Second: Fabienne Rieder
- Lead: Selina Rychiger
- Coach: Andreas Schwaller
- Finalist: (Denmark) Madeleine Dupont

The 2025 AMJ Campbell Shorty Jenkins Classic was a curling tournament held from September 10 to 14 at the Cornwall Curling Centre in Cornwall, Ontario. The event was held in a round robin format with a purse of $60,000 on the men's side and $45,000 on the women's side.

In the men's final, Sudbury's Team John Epping scored one in the eighth to defeat Switzerland's Yannick Schwaller 6–3. Epping, with Jacob Horgan, Tanner Horgan and Ian McMillan was the only team to finished undefeated through the round robin with a perfect 5–0 record. As the top playoff seed, they beat China's Xu Xiaoming in the quarterfinals and the United States' Daniel Casper in the semifinals. Team Schwaller finished 4–1 and earned the second seed where they eliminated Quebec's Julien Tremblay and Scotland's Team Waddell, being skipped by Cameron Bryce. World number one ranked Team Mouat, playing without Mouat and being skipped by Grant Hardie, were eliminated in the quarterfinals alongside Scotland's Ross Whyte.

On the women's side, Switzerland's Xenia Schwaller capped off an undefeated run by beating Denmark's Madeleine Dupont 8–5. After also finishing as the only 5–0 team in the field, Schwaller squad of Selina Gafner, Fabienne Rieder and Selina Rychiger earned a bye to the semifinals where they took down Korea's Ha Seung-youn. Team Dupont, meanwhile, finished 4–1 through the round robin. She then stole a quarterfinal win against Ontario's Hailey Armstrong before downing world number one ranked Team Rachel Homan 8–1 in the semifinals. It was a second loss for the defending champion Homan who also lost 7–2 in the round robin to Team Schwaller. Japan's Momoha Tabata rounded out the playoff field.

== Men ==
=== Teams ===
The teams are listed as follows:

Skip	Third	Second	Lead	Alternate	Locale
Daniel Casper	Luc Violette	Ben Richardson	Aidan Oldenburg	Rich Ruohonen	(United States) Chaska, Minnesota
James Grattan (Fourth)	Denis Cordick (Skip)	Andy McCann	Doug McDermot		Halton Hills, Ontario
Matt Dunstone	Colton Lott	E. J. Harnden	Ryan Harnden		Winnipeg, Manitoba
John Epping	Jake Horgan	Tanner Horgan	Ian McMillan		Sudbury, Ontario
Philipp Hösli (Fourth)	Marco Hösli (Skip)	Simon Gloor	Justin Hausherr		Glarus, Switzerland
Scott Howard	Mat Camm	Jason Camm	Scott Chadwick		Navan, Ontario
Lee Jae-beom	Lee Ki-jeong	Kim Min-woo	Kim Jeong-min		Seoul, South Korea
Yannick Martel	Jean-François Charest	Émile Asselin	Bradley Lequin		Chicoutimi, Quebec
Jordan McNamara	Colton Daly	Jacob Clarke	Brendan Laframboise	Owen Nicholls	Ottawa, Ontario
Pierre-Luc Morissette	Mathis Arsenault	Pierre Lajoie	Pierre Lanoue	Maxime Bilodeau	Quebec City, Quebec
Grant Hardie	Kyle Waddell (Note: Kyle Waddell spared for Bruce Mouat. He played third while Grant Hardie moved up to skipped.)	Bobby Lammie	Hammy McMillan Jr.		Edinburgh, Scotland
Kibo Mulima	Wesley Forget	Ed Cyr	Josh Leung	Wyatt Wright	Waterloo, Ontario
Benjamin Kapp (Note: With skip Marc Muskatewitz unable to attend, the rest of the team moved up the lineup a position.)	Felix Messenzehl	Johannes Scheuerl	Mario Trevisiol		Füssen, Germany
Owen Purcell	Luke Saunders	Gavin Lydiate	Ryan Abraham		Halifax, Nova Scotia
Benoît Schwarz-van Berkel (Fourth)	Yannick Schwaller (Skip)	Sven Michel	Pablo Lachat		Geneva, Switzerland
Yves Stocker	Kim Schwaller	Marco Hefti	Felix Eberhard		Zug, Switzerland
Julien Tremblay	Jesse Mullen	Jean-Michel Arsenault	Philippe Brassard		Lévis, Quebec
Cameron Bryce (Note: Cameron Bryce replaced Kyle Waddell who spared on Team Mouat.)	Mark Watt	Angus Bryce	Blair Haswell		Hamilton, Scotland
Ross Whyte	Robin Brydone	Craig Waddell (Note: Alternate Craig Waddell spared for Duncan McFadzean.)	Euan Kyle		Stirling, Scotland
Xu Xiaoming	Fei Xueqing	Li Zhichao	Xu Jingtao	Yang Bohao	Beijing, China

=== Round robin standings ===
Final Round Robin Standings

Key
Teams to Playoffs

Pool A	W	L	PF	PA
(Scotland) Team Mouat	4	1	28	18
(Scotland) Team Waddell	4	1	29	23
(China) Xu Xiaoming	3	2	30	26
(Quebec) Yannick Martel	1	4	20	35
(Quebec) Pierre-Luc Morissette	1	4	20	38

Pool B	W	L	PF	PA
(Ontario) John Epping	5	0	31	16
(Switzerland) Yannick Schwaller	4	1	38	17
(United States) Daniel Casper	4	1	36	20
(Ontario) Kibo Mulima	3	2	25	23
(South Korea) Lee Jae-beom	1	4	25	32

Pool C	W	L	PF	PA
(Quebec) Julien Tremblay	3	2	32	27
(Manitoba) Matt Dunstone	2	3	23	25
(Ontario) Scott Howard	2	3	24	31
(Germany) Team Muskatewitz	1	4	15	29
(Ontario) Denis Cordick	0	5	14	43

Pool D	W	L	PF	PA
(Scotland) Ross Whyte	4	1	45	19
(Switzerland) Marco Hösli	3	2	23	17
(Nova Scotia) Owen Purcell	3	2	35	24
(Switzerland) Yves Stocker	2	3	27	27
(Ontario) Jordan McNamara	0	5	10	40

=== Round robin results ===
All draw times are listed in Eastern Time (UTC−04:00).

==== Draw 1 ====
Wednesday, September 10, 7:00 pm

Sheet 2	1	2	3	4	5	6	7	8	Final
(China) Xu Xiaoming	0	0	0	1	0	0	0	X	1
(Switzerland) Marco Hösli 🔨	0	1	0	0	1	0	2	X	4

Sheet 3	1	2	3	4	5	6	7	8	Final
(Switzerland) Yannick Schwaller	0	0	2	2	2	0	X	X	6
(Germany) Team Muskatewitz 🔨	0	1	0	0	0	0	X	X	1

Sheet 4	1	2	3	4	5	6	7	8	9	Final
(Scotland) Team Mouat 🔨	0	2	0	0	0	0	2	0	3	7
(Scotland) Ross Whyte	0	0	1	1	0	0	0	2	0	4

==== Draw 2 ====
Thursday, September 11, 11:00 am

Sheet 4	1	2	3	4	5	6	7	8	Final
(United States) Daniel Casper	0	1	2	1	0	2	3	X	9
(Ontario) Scott Howard 🔨	2	0	0	0	2	0	0	X	4

Sheet 5	1	2	3	4	5	6	7	8	Final
(South Korea) Lee Jae-beom 🔨	0	1	0	1	0	0	0	X	2
(Quebec) Julien Tremblay	2	0	2	0	1	1	2	X	8

==== Draw 3 ====
Thursday, September 11, 2:00 pm

Sheet 1	1	2	3	4	5	6	7	8	Final
(Quebec) Yannick Martel 🔨	3	0	4	1	X	X	X	X	8
(Ontario) Jordan McNamara	0	1	0	0	X	X	X	X	1

Sheet 3	1	2	3	4	5	6	7	8	Final
(Scotland) Team Mouat	0	2	0	2	1	0	X	X	5
(Switzerland) Marco Hösli 🔨	0	0	1	0	0	1	X	X	2

Sheet 4	1	2	3	4	5	6	7	8	Final
(Scotland) Team Waddell 🔨	1	0	2	0	3	0	0	1	7
(Switzerland) Yves Stocker	0	2	0	1	0	2	1	0	6

Sheet 5	1	2	3	4	5	6	7	8	Final
(Manitoba) Matt Dunstone	0	0	0	0	2	0	0	X	2
(Ontario) John Epping 🔨	0	2	0	0	0	0	2	X	4

Sheet 6	1	2	3	4	5	6	7	8	Final
(Germany) Team Muskatewitz 🔨	0	0	0	0	1	0	X	X	1
(Ontario) Kibo Mulima	0	2	1	1	0	3	X	X	7

==== Draw 4 ====
Thursday, September 11, 5:00 pm

Sheet 1	1	2	3	4	5	6	7	8	Final
(United States) Daniel Casper	0	0	1	2	0	2	0	3	8
(Quebec) Julien Tremblay 🔨	0	1	0	0	2	0	1	0	4

Sheet 2	1	2	3	4	5	6	7	8	Final
(Ontario) Scott Howard 🔨	0	0	4	0	0	3	0	1	8
(South Korea) Lee Jae-beom	1	1	0	2	1	0	2	0	7

Sheet 3	1	2	3	4	5	6	7	8	Final
(Quebec) Pierre-Luc Morissette	0	0	2	0	1	0	0	X	3
(Nova Scotia) Owen Purcell 🔨	2	0	0	2	0	3	4	X	11

Sheet 6	1	2	3	4	5	6	7	8	Final
(Scotland) Ross Whyte 🔨	1	4	0	1	0	1	3	X	10
(China) Xu Xiaoming	0	0	1	0	2	0	0	X	3

==== Draw 5 ====
Thursday, September 11, 8:00 pm

Sheet 1	1	2	3	4	5	6	7	8	9	Final
(Ontario) Kibo Mulima 🔨	2	0	0	0	1	0	0	1	1	5
(Manitoba) Matt Dunstone	0	0	2	0	0	0	2	0	0	4

Sheet 4	1	2	3	4	5	6	7	8	Final
(Switzerland) Yannick Schwaller 🔨	2	1	0	5	1	4	X	X	13
(Ontario) Denis Cordick	0	0	2	0	0	0	X	X	2

==== Draw 6 ====
Friday, September 12, 8:00 am

Sheet 1	1	2	3	4	5	6	7	8	Final
(Germany) Team Muskatewitz 🔨	0	1	0	1	0	0	X	X	2
(Ontario) John Epping	1	0	2	0	0	3	X	X	6

Sheet 2	1	2	3	4	5	6	7	8	Final
(Scotland) Team Waddell 🔨	0	2	0	2	0	3	X	X	7
(Nova Scotia) Owen Purcell	1	0	1	0	0	0	X	X	2

Sheet 4	1	2	3	4	5	6	7	8	Final
(Quebec) Pierre-Luc Morissette	0	3	0	2	1	4	X	X	10
(Ontario) Jordan McNamara 🔨	1	0	1	0	0	0	X	X	2

Sheet 5	1	2	3	4	5	6	7	8	Final
(Ontario) Kibo Mulima	1	0	2	0	X	X	X	X	3
(Quebec) Julien Tremblay 🔨	0	4	0	6	X	X	X	X	10

Sheet 6	1	2	3	4	5	6	7	8	Final
(Quebec) Yannick Martel 🔨	2	0	0	0	1	0	1	0	4
(Switzerland) Yves Stocker	0	2	0	2	0	2	0	1	7

==== Draw 7 ====
Friday, September 12, 11:00 am

Sheet 6	1	2	3	4	5	6	7	8	Final
(United States) Daniel Casper	1	0	1	1	0	2	0	1	6
(Ontario) Denis Cordick 🔨	0	2	0	0	2	0	1	0	5

==== Draw 8 ====
Friday, September 12, 2:00 pm

Sheet 1	1	2	3	4	5	6	7	8	Final
(China) Xu Xiaoming 🔨	3	0	1	0	1	0	3	X	8
(Switzerland) Yves Stocker	0	1	0	2	0	2	0	X	5

Sheet 3	1	2	3	4	5	6	7	8	Final
(Manitoba) Matt Dunstone	0	1	0	1	0	2	0	2	6
(South Korea) Lee Jae-beom 🔨	1	0	2	0	1	0	1	0	5

Sheet 4	1	2	3	4	5	6	7	8	Final
(Ontario) John Epping 🔨	2	0	3	1	0	0	3	X	9
(Quebec) Julien Tremblay	0	1	0	0	2	1	0	X	4

Sheet 5	1	2	3	4	5	6	7	8	Final
(Switzerland) Yannick Schwaller 🔨	2	3	0	0	2	X	X	X	7
(Ontario) Scott Howard	0	0	1	1	0	X	X	X	2

==== Draw 9 ====
Friday, September 12, 5:00 pm

Sheet 1	1	2	3	4	5	6	7	8	Final
(Scotland) Team Waddell	0	1	0	0	0	2	1	1	5
(Switzerland) Marco Hösli 🔨	1	0	0	2	0	0	0	0	3

Sheet 4	1	2	3	4	5	6	7	8	Final
(Nova Scotia) Owen Purcell 🔨	2	3	1	0	3	X	X	X	9
(Quebec) Yannick Martel	0	0	0	2	0	X	X	X	2

Sheet 5	1	2	3	4	5	6	7	8	Final
(Scotland) Team Mouat 🔨	3	1	0	0	4	0	X	X	8
(Ontario) Jordan McNamara	0	0	0	2	0	1	X	X	3

Sheet 6	1	2	3	4	5	6	7	8	Final
(Scotland) Ross Whyte 🔨	3	2	2	0	2	2	X	X	11
(Quebec) Pierre-Luc Morissette	0	0	0	1	0	0	X	X	1

==== Draw 10 ====
Friday, September 12, 8:00 pm

Sheet 2	1	2	3	4	5	6	7	8	Final
(South Korea) Lee Jae-beom 🔨	2	0	1	3	0	4	X	X	10
(Ontario) Denis Cordick	0	0	0	0	1	0	X	X	1

==== Draw 11 ====
Saturday, September 13, 8:00 am

Sheet 1	1	2	3	4	5	6	7	8	9	Final
(Manitoba) Matt Dunstone	1	1	0	0	1	1	0	0	1	5
(United States) Daniel Casper 🔨	0	0	2	0	0	0	0	2	0	4

Sheet 2	1	2	3	4	5	6	7	8	Final
(Scotland) Ross Whyte 🔨	2	0	0	2	3	0	3	X	10
(Quebec) Yannick Martel	0	1	1	0	0	2	0	X	4

Sheet 3	1	2	3	4	5	6	7	8	Final
(Switzerland) Marco Hösli 🔨	1	0	0	1	2	2	0	0	6
(Quebec) Pierre-Luc Morissette	0	0	2	0	0	0	1	1	4

Sheet 4	1	2	3	4	5	6	7	8	Final
(Switzerland) Yves Stocker 🔨	1	0	0	0	X	X	X	X	1
(Scotland) Team Mouat	0	1	3	2	X	X	X	X	6

Sheet 5	1	2	3	4	5	6	7	8	Final
(Nova Scotia) Owen Purcell	1	0	3	0	0	1	0	X	5
(China) Xu Xiaoming 🔨	0	1	0	3	3	0	3	X	10

Sheet 6	1	2	3	4	5	6	7	8	Final
(Ontario) Jordan McNamara	0	1	0	0	0	1	0	X	2
(Scotland) Team Waddell 🔨	1	0	0	3	1	0	1	X	6

==== Draw 12 ====
Saturday, September 13, 11:00 am

Sheet 4	1	2	3	4	5	6	7	8	Final
(South Korea) Lee Jae-beom	0	0	1	0	X	X	X	X	1
(Germany) Team Muskatewitz 🔨	1	2	0	6	X	X	X	X	9

Sheet 5	1	2	3	4	5	6	7	8	Final
(Ontario) Denis Cordick	0	0	2	0	0	1	0	X	3
(Ontario) Kibo Mulima 🔨	1	3	0	0	2	0	2	X	8

==== Draw 13 ====
Saturday, September 13, 2:00 pm

Sheet 2	1	2	3	4	5	6	7	8	Final
(Switzerland) Yannick Schwaller 🔨	0	1	0	2	0	2	0	2	7
(Manitoba) Matt Dunstone	2	0	1	0	2	0	1	0	6

Sheet 5	1	2	3	4	5	6	7	8	Final
(Ontario) John Epping	0	2	0	2	0	1	0	1	6
(Ontario) Scott Howard 🔨	1	0	1	0	2	0	1	0	5

==== Draw 14 ====
Saturday, September 13, 5:00 pm

Sheet 1	1	2	3	4	5	6	7	8	Final
(Nova Scotia) Owen Purcell 🔨	2	0	3	0	3	X	X	X	8
(Scotland) Team Mouat	0	1	0	1	0	X	X	X	2

Sheet 2	1	2	3	4	5	6	7	8	Final
(Ontario) Jordan McNamara 🔨	0	0	0	0	2	0	X	X	2
(China) Xu Xiaoming	1	2	1	1	0	3	X	X	8

Sheet 3	1	2	3	4	5	6	7	8	Final
(Germany) Team Muskatewitz	0	0	0	0	2	0	X	X	2
(United States) Daniel Casper 🔨	1	2	1	2	0	3	X	X	9

Sheet 4	1	2	3	4	5	6	7	8	Final
(Scotland) Ross Whyte 🔨	2	0	0	3	0	5	X	X	10
(Scotland) Team Waddell	0	1	2	0	1	0	X	X	4

Sheet 5	1	2	3	4	5	6	7	8	Final
(Switzerland) Marco Hösli 🔨	2	1	1	0	2	2	X	X	8
(Quebec) Yannick Martel	0	0	0	2	0	0	X	X	2

Sheet 6	1	2	3	4	5	6	7	8	Final
(Switzerland) Yves Stocker 🔨	5	0	2	0	0	1	X	X	8
(Quebec) Pierre-Luc Morissette	0	1	0	1	0	0	X	X	2

==== Draw 15 ====
Saturday, September 13, 8:00 pm

Sheet 1	1	2	3	4	5	6	7	8	Final
(Ontario) Denis Cordick	0	0	1	0	2	0	X	X	3
(Ontario) John Epping 🔨	0	2	0	1	0	3	X	X	6

Sheet 3	1	2	3	4	5	6	7	8	Final
(Switzerland) Yannick Schwaller 🔨	2	0	1	0	1	0	0	1	5
(Quebec) Julien Tremblay	0	2	0	1	0	3	0	0	6

Sheet 4	1	2	3	4	5	6	7	8	Final
(Ontario) Kibo Mulima 🔨	2	0	0	0	0	0	0	X	2
(Ontario) Scott Howard	0	1	1	0	0	1	2	X	5

=== Playoffs ===
Quarterfinals
1	(Ontario) John Epping	7
8	(China) Xu Xiaoming	4
4	(Scotland) Team Mouat	4
5	(United States) Daniel Casper	7
2	(Switzerland) Yannick Schwaller	7
7	(Quebec) Julien Tremblay	2
3	(Scotland) Ross Whyte	4
6	(Scotland) Team Waddell	5

Semifinals
1	(Ontario) John Epping	4
5	(United States) Daniel Casper	3
2	(Switzerland) Yannick Schwaller	6
6	(Scotland) Team Waddell	5

Final
1	(Ontario) John Epping	6
2	(Switzerland) Yannick Schwaller	3

==== Quarterfinals ====
Sunday, September 14, 8:30 am

Sheet 1	1	2	3	4	5	6	7	8	Final
(Switzerland) Yannick Schwaller 🔨	1	2	0	0	0	2	2	X	7
(Quebec) Julien Tremblay	0	0	2	0	0	0	0	X	2

Sheet 2	1	2	3	4	5	6	7	8	Final
(Scotland) Team Mouat 🔨	2	0	2	0	0	0	0	0	4
(United States) Daniel Casper	0	3	0	2	0	0	0	2	7

Sheet 5	1	2	3	4	5	6	7	8	Final
(Ontario) John Epping 🔨	2	0	1	0	2	0	2	X	7
(China) Xu Xiaoming	0	2	0	1	0	1	0	X	4

Sheet 6	1	2	3	4	5	6	7	8	Final
(Scotland) Ross Whyte 🔨	0	2	0	0	0	1	0	1	4
(Scotland) Team Waddell	1	0	0	1	1	0	2	0	5

==== Semifinals ====
Sunday, September 14, 12:30 pm

Sheet 1	1	2	3	4	5	6	7	8	Final
(Ontario) John Epping 🔨	2	0	1	0	0	0	1	0	4
(United States) Daniel Casper	0	1	0	1	0	0	0	1	3

Sheet 2	1	2	3	4	5	6	7	8	Final
(Switzerland) Yannick Schwaller	1	0	0	2	0	3	0	0	6
(Scotland) Team Waddell 🔨	0	1	0	0	2	0	1	1	5

==== Final ====
Sunday, September 14, 3:30 pm

Sheet 5	1	2	3	4	5	6	7	8	Final
(Ontario) John Epping 🔨	1	0	1	0	1	2	0	1	6
(Switzerland) Yannick Schwaller	0	1	0	1	0	0	1	0	3

== Women ==
=== Teams ===
The teams are listed as follows:

Skip	Third	Second	Lead	Alternate	Locale
Hailey Armstrong	Grace Lloyd	Michaela Robert	Rachel Steele	Grace Cave	Whitby, Ontario
Emma Artichuk	Jamie Smith	Evelyn Robert	Lauren Rajala		Waterloo, Ontario
Christina Black	Jill Brothers	Marlee Powers (Note: Alternate Marlee Powers played second, replacing Jenn Baxter.)	Karlee Everist		Halifax, Nova Scotia
Madeleine Dupont	Mathilde Halse	Denise Dupont	My Larsen	Jasmin Holtermann	Hvidovre, Denmark
Jaimee Gardner	Cassandra Lewin	Jessica Thorne	Kaileigh Morrison		North Grenville, Ontario
Ha Seung-youn	Kim Hye-rin	Yang Tae-i	Kim Su-jin	Park Seo-jin	Chuncheon, South Korea
Rachel Homan	Tracy Fleury	Emma Miskew	Sarah Wilkes		Ottawa, Ontario
Emilie Lovitt	Celeste Gauthier	Paige Bown	Sarah Leung		Navan, Ontario
Kayla MacMillan	Brittany Tran	Lindsay Dubue	Lauren Lenentine	Sarah Loken	Victoria, British Columbia
Lauren Mann	Brenda Nicholls	Stephanie Barbeau	Pamela Nugent		Gatineau, Quebec
Xenia Schwaller	Selina Gafner	Fabienne Rieder	Selina Rychiger		Zurich, Switzerland
Laurie St-Georges	Sarah Daniels	Émilia Gagné	Emily Riley		Laval, Quebec
Momoha Tabata (Fourth)	Miku Nihira (Skip) (Note: Miku Nihira skipped Team Tabata.)	Sae Yamamoto	Mikoto Nakajima		Sapporo, Japan
Isabella Wranå	Almida de Val	Maria Larsson	Linda Stenlund		Sundbyberg, Sweden

=== Round robin standings ===
Final Round Robin Standings

Key
Teams to Playoffs

Pool A	W	L	PF	PA
(Switzerland) Xenia Schwaller	5	0	41	19
(Ontario) Rachel Homan	4	1	36	21
(Quebec) Laurie St-Georges	3	2	31	20
(Quebec) Lauren Mann	2	3	22	35
(Sweden) Isabella Wranå	2	3	24	27
(Ontario) Emilie Lovitt	1	4	16	36
(British Columbia) Kayla MacMillan	1	4	20	32

Pool B	W	L	PF	PA
(Denmark) Madeleine Dupont	4	1	38	22
(Japan) Team Tabata	4	1	34	23
(South Korea) Ha Seung-youn	3	2	31	18
(Ontario) Hailey Armstrong	3	2	27	32
(Nova Scotia) Christina Black	2	3	25	26
(Ontario) Emma Artichuk	1	4	32	33
(Ontario) Jaimee Gardner	0	5	8	41

=== Round robin results ===
All draw times are listed in Eastern Time (UTC−04:00).

==== Draw 1 ====
Wednesday, September 10, 7:00 pm

Sheet 1	1	2	3	4	5	6	7	8	Final
(Japan) Team Tabata 🔨	1	0	2	0	2	0	2	0	7
(Ontario) Emma Artichuk	0	1	0	1	0	1	0	2	5

Sheet 5	1	2	3	4	5	6	7	8	Final
(Switzerland) Xenia Schwaller 🔨	0	3	0	2	1	0	2	X	8
(British Columbia) Kayla MacMillan	0	0	1	0	0	2	0	X	3

Sheet 6	1	2	3	4	5	6	7	8	Final
(South Korea) Ha Seung-youn 🔨	0	1	0	1	0	0	1	0	3
(Denmark) Madeleine Dupont	0	0	1	0	0	3	0	1	5

==== Draw 2 ====
Thursday, September 11, 11:00 am

Sheet 1	1	2	3	4	5	6	7	8	Final
(Denmark) Madeleine Dupont	2	1	2	0	3	0	X	X	8
(Ontario) Jaimee Gardner 🔨	0	0	0	1	0	1	X	X	2

Sheet 2	1	2	3	4	5	6	7	8	Final
(Quebec) Lauren Mann	1	1	0	1	0	0	2	1	6
(Nova Scotia) Christina Black 🔨	0	0	1	0	2	1	0	0	4

Sheet 3	1	2	3	4	5	6	7	8	Final
(Quebec) Laurie St-Georges	3	1	0	1	3	X	X	X	8
(Ontario) Emilie Lovitt 🔨	0	0	1	0	0	X	X	X	1

Sheet 6	1	2	3	4	5	6	7	8	9	Final
(Ontario) Emma Artichuk 🔨	1	0	2	1	0	2	0	1	0	7
(Ontario) Hailey Armstrong	0	4	0	0	1	0	2	0	1	8

==== Draw 3 ====
Thursday, September 11, 2:00 pm

Sheet 2	1	2	3	4	5	6	7	8	Final
(Ontario) Rachel Homan 🔨	2	0	1	0	3	0	4	X	10
(Sweden) Isabella Wranå	0	1	0	1	0	4	0	X	6

==== Draw 4 ====
Thursday, September 11, 5:00 pm

Sheet 4	1	2	3	4	5	6	7	8	Final
(South Korea) Ha Seung-youn 🔨	1	0	2	1	4	0	X	X	8
(Ontario) Jaimee Gardner	0	2	0	0	0	1	X	X	3

Sheet 5	1	2	3	4	5	6	7	8	Final
(Nova Scotia) Christina Black 🔨	2	2	0	0	1	0	0	1	6
(Ontario) Hailey Armstrong	0	0	1	1	0	1	1	0	4

==== Draw 5 ====
Thursday, September 11, 8:00 pm

Sheet 2	1	2	3	4	5	6	7	8	Final
(British Columbia) Kayla MacMillan 🔨	0	1	0	0	0	1	1	0	3
(Ontario) Emilie Lovitt	1	0	1	0	1	0	0	1	4

Sheet 3	1	2	3	4	5	6	7	8	Final
(Switzerland) Xenia Schwaller 🔨	1	0	2	0	3	1	1	X	8
(Quebec) Lauren Mann	0	3	0	1	0	0	0	X	4

Sheet 5	1	2	3	4	5	6	7	8	Final
(Ontario) Rachel Homan 🔨	0	2	0	2	0	2	0	1	7
(Quebec) Laurie St-Georges	1	0	1	0	2	0	1	0	5

Sheet 6	1	2	3	4	5	6	7	8	Final
(Sweden) Isabella Wranå 🔨	0	0	0	1	0	1	0	X	2
(Japan) Team Tabata	0	0	1	0	3	0	0	X	4

==== Draw 6 ====
Friday, September 12, 8:00 am

Sheet 3	1	2	3	4	5	6	7	8	Final
(South Korea) Ha Seung-youn 🔨	0	2	1	2	0	2	0	X	7
(Nova Scotia) Christina Black	0	0	0	0	1	0	0	X	1

==== Draw 7 ====
Friday, September 12, 11:00 am

Sheet 1	1	2	3	4	5	6	7	8	9	Final
(Switzerland) Xenia Schwaller	0	1	0	0	3	2	1	0	1	8
(Denmark) Madeleine Dupont 🔨	3	0	1	1	0	0	0	2	0	7

Sheet 2	1	2	3	4	5	6	7	8	Final
(Ontario) Emma Artichuk 🔨	2	2	0	0	0	3	1	X	8
(Ontario) Jaimee Gardner	0	0	2	1	0	0	0	X	3

Sheet 3	1	2	3	4	5	6	7	8	Final
(Ontario) Rachel Homan 🔨	2	3	0	0	1	1	X	X	7
(British Columbia) Kayla MacMillan	0	0	1	1	0	0	X	X	2

Sheet 4	1	2	3	4	5	6	7	8	Final
(Quebec) Lauren Mann	0	0	0	1	X	X	X	X	1
(Quebec) Laurie St-Georges 🔨	3	3	1	0	X	X	X	X	7

Sheet 5	1	2	3	4	5	6	7	8	Final
(Sweden) Isabella Wranå 🔨	0	2	0	1	1	1	0	X	5
(Ontario) Emilie Lovitt	0	0	1	0	0	0	1	X	2

==== Draw 8 ====
Friday, September 12, 2:00 pm

Sheet 2	1	2	3	4	5	6	7	8	Final
(South Korea) Ha Seung-youn	0	0	0	2	0	1	1	0	4
(Ontario) Hailey Armstrong 🔨	0	1	0	0	1	0	0	3	5

Sheet 6	1	2	3	4	5	6	7	8	9	Final
(Japan) Team Tabata 🔨	1	0	0	2	0	3	0	1	2	9
(Nova Scotia) Christina Black	0	2	3	0	1	0	1	0	0	7

==== Draw 9 ====
Friday, September 12, 5:00 pm

Sheet 2	1	2	3	4	5	6	7	8	9	Final
(Sweden) Isabella Wranå 🔨	0	0	1	1	1	0	1	0	1	5
(Quebec) Laurie St-Georges	1	1	0	0	0	1	0	1	0	4

Sheet 3	1	2	3	4	5	6	7	8	Final
(Denmark) Madeleine Dupont	0	1	0	0	4	0	3	X	8
(Ontario) Emma Artichuk 🔨	2	0	1	2	0	1	0	X	6

==== Draw 10 ====
Friday, September 12, 8:00 pm

Sheet 1	1	2	3	4	5	6	7	8	Final
(Quebec) Lauren Mann 🔨	3	0	0	2	1	0	0	4	10
(Ontario) Emilie Lovitt	0	1	1	0	0	3	1	0	6

Sheet 3	1	2	3	4	5	6	7	8	Final
(Japan) Team Tabata	2	2	2	4	X	X	X	X	10
(Ontario) Jaimee Gardner 🔨	0	0	0	0	X	X	X	X	0

Sheet 4	1	2	3	4	5	6	7	8	9	Final
(British Columbia) Kayla MacMillan	0	1	0	2	1	0	1	0	0	5
(Ontario) Hailey Armstrong 🔨	1	0	1	0	0	2	0	1	2	7

Sheet 5	1	2	3	4	5	6	7	8	Final
(Ontario) Rachel Homan	0	1	0	1	0	0	X	X	2
(Switzerland) Xenia Schwaller 🔨	2	0	1	0	1	3	X	X	7

==== Draw 12 ====
Saturday, September 13, 11:00 am

Sheet 1	1	2	3	4	5	6	7	8	Final
(Switzerland) Xenia Schwaller 🔨	2	0	2	1	0	2	3	X	10
(Ontario) Emilie Lovitt	0	1	0	0	2	0	0	X	3

Sheet 2	1	2	3	4	5	6	7	8	Final
(Ontario) Rachel Homan 🔨	5	0	5	X	X	X	X	X	10
(Quebec) Lauren Mann	0	1	0	X	X	X	X	X	1

Sheet 3	1	2	3	4	5	6	7	8	9	Final
(Quebec) Laurie St-Georges	2	0	0	0	0	1	0	3	1	7
(Ontario) Emma Artichuk 🔨	0	1	1	1	0	0	3	0	0	6

Sheet 6	1	2	3	4	5	6	7	8	Final
(Denmark) Madeleine Dupont 🔨	2	0	3	0	1	4	X	X	10
(Ontario) Hailey Armstrong	0	2	0	1	0	0	X	X	3

==== Draw 13 ====
Saturday, September 13, 2:00 pm

Sheet 1	1	2	3	4	5	6	7	8	Final
(South Korea) Ha Seung-youn 🔨	2	1	0	2	0	4	X	X	9
(Japan) Team Tabata	0	0	2	0	2	0	X	X	4

Sheet 3	1	2	3	4	5	6	7	8	Final
(Nova Scotia) Christina Black	2	2	0	1	2	X	X	X	7
(Ontario) Jaimee Gardner 🔨	0	0	0	0	0	X	X	X	0

Sheet 4	1	2	3	4	5	6	7	8	Final
(Sweden) Isabella Wranå 🔨	0	0	2	0	1	0	2	1	6
(British Columbia) Kayla MacMillan	1	1	0	4	0	1	0	0	7

=== Playoffs ===
Quarterfinals
4	(Japan) Team Tabata	1
5	(South Korea) Ha Seung-youn	7
3	(Denmark) Madeleine Dupont	6
6	(Ontario) Hailey Armstrong	5

Semifinals
1	(Switzerland) Xenia Schwaller	6
5	(South Korea) Ha Seung-youn	5
2	(Ontario) Rachel Homan	1
3	(Denmark) Madeleine Dupont	8

Final
1	(Switzerland) Xenia Schwaller	8
3	(Denmark) Madeleine Dupont	5

==== Quarterfinals ====
Saturday, September 13, 8:00 pm

Sheet 2	1	2	3	4	5	6	7	8	Final
(Japan) Team Tabata 🔨	0	0	1	0	0	0	0	X	1
(South Korea) Ha Seung-youn	0	0	0	1	2	1	3	X	7

Sheet 5	1	2	3	4	5	6	7	8	9	Final
(Denmark) Madeleine Dupont 🔨	1	0	1	0	0	1	0	2	1	6
(Ontario) Hailey Armstrong	0	0	0	2	0	0	3	0	0	5

==== Semifinals ====
Sunday, September 14, 8:30 am

Sheet 3	1	2	3	4	5	6	7	8	Final
(Switzerland) Xenia Schwaller 🔨	0	2	0	1	0	2	0	1	6
(South Korea) Ha Seung-youn	1	0	1	0	1	0	2	0	5

Sheet 4	1	2	3	4	5	6	7	8	Final
(Ontario) Rachel Homan 🔨	0	0	1	0	0	0	X	X	1
(Denmark) Madeleine Dupont	0	1	0	1	1	5	X	X	8

==== Final ====
Sunday, September 14, 12:30 pm

Sheet 5	1	2	3	4	5	6	7	8	Final
(Switzerland) Xenia Schwaller 🔨	3	0	2	0	0	1	0	2	8
(Denmark) Madeleine Dupont	0	1	0	2	0	0	2	0	5
