= Fabienne Rieder =

Swiss curler (born 2002)

- Curler
- Born: October 8, 2002 (age 24); Unterseen, Switzerland

Team
- Curling club: GC Zurich, Zurich, SUI
- Skip: Xenia Schwaller
- Third: Selina Gafner
- Second: Fabienne Rieder
- Lead: Selina Rychiger

Curling career
- Member Association: Switzerland
- World Championship: 1 (2026)
Medal record
Women's curling
Representing Switzerland
World Championships
Gold medal – first place	2026 Calgary
World Junior Championships
Gold medal – first place	2024 Lohja

Fabienne Rieder (born October 8, 2002) is a Swiss curler from Matten. She currently plays second on Team Xenia Schwaller. Playing for Schwaller, Rieder won gold at the 2026 World Women's Curling Championship and the 2024 World Junior Curling Championships.

== Career ==
Skipping her own team, Rieder won back-to-back bronze medals at the Swiss Junior Curling Championships in 2019 and 2020. With most of the 2020–21 season cancelled due to the COVID-19 pandemic, the team only played in one event, finishing 1–3 at the 2020 Women's Masters Basel. The following season, her team finished second at the Swiss trials for both the 2022 and 2023 World Junior Curling Championships to the Grasshopper Club Zurich led by Xenia Schwaller. Following the season, Rieder and teammate Selina Rychiger joined the Zurich rink at third and alternate respectively, replacing Malin Da Ros and Sarah Müller. The team also consisted of skip Xenia Schwaller, second Marion Wüest and lead Selina Gafner.

Team Schwaller began competing in more women's events during the 2022–23 season while still junior eligible. The team played in the 2022 Women's Masters Basel where they went undefeated until the quarterfinals where they narrowly lost to the Silvana Tirinzoni rink 4–3. They continued their momentum into the rest of the season, going undefeated to claim the Match Town Trophy in October and the St. Galler Elite Challenge in the new year. They also won the OVCA U21 Junior Superspiel in Ottawa, Ontario, defeating many of the top ranked Canadian junior teams in the process. In February, the team represented Switzerland at the 2023 World Junior Curling Championships where they were dominant through the round robin, qualifying for the playoffs with an undefeated 9–0 record. In the semifinal, they faced Japan. After controlling most of the match, the gave up three points in the tenth end to lose 7–5. They could not recover in the bronze medal game, finishing fourth after an 8–5 loss to Norway. The next month, the team turned things around by once again going undefeated to capture the 2023 Swiss junior championship, qualifying for the 2024 World Junior Curling Championships the following season.

Throughout the 2023–24 season, Team Schwaller became a dominant force on the women's tour, defeating many of the top teams in the world. Their triumphant run began at the 2023 AMJ Campbell Shorty Jenkins Classic where they advanced to the semifinals after previous victories over Ha Seung-youn, Laurie St-Georges and Kim Eun-jung. The team then won four straight tour events. On the Nordic Curling Tour, they defended their title at the Match Town Trophy before also claiming the Sundbyberg Open and the Danish Open. They then won the DeKalb Superspiel in Canada, defeating the likes of Krista McCarville, Delaney Strouse and Selena Sturmay in the process. In the final, they won 6–5 over Serena Gray-Withers. At the 2023 Western Showdown, they defeated 2018 Olympic gold medalist Anna Hasselborg in their round robin meeting, eventually losing to Korea's Gim Eun-ji in a qualification game.

To begin the 2024 part of their season, they went undefeated until the final of the 2024 Cortina Curling Cup, falling 6–4 to Turkey's Dilşat Yıldız. They then played in the 2024 International Bernese Ladies Cup where after a 3–2 round robin record, they defeated the world number one ranked Team Silvana Tirinzoni in the quarterfinals before losing out to Korea's Gim in the semifinals. Next for Team Schwaller was the 2024 Swiss Women's Curling Championship where they again beat Tirinzoni in the round robin, along with Corrie Hürlimann and Roxane Héritier to finish 3–1 and qualifying directly for the final. There, they could not beat Tirinzoni for a third time, losing the match 5–4 and settling for silver. Their success throughout the season made them the highest ranked team headed into the World Junior championships in Lohja, Finland. For the second straight year, they finished 9–0 through the round robin, again earning the top spot in the playoff round. They then beat Canada's Myla Plett in the semifinal before securing the gold medal with a dominant 10–3 win against Japan's Momoha Tabata. With the amount of points cumulated throughout the season, Team Schwaller became the first junior team to qualify outright for a Grand Slam of Curling event. At the year-end 2024 Players' Championship, the team finished with a 1–4 record, defeating four-time Canadian champion Kerri Einarson 6–4 in their sole win.

To begin the 2024–25 season, Team Schwaller finished runner-up to Anna Hasselborg at the 2024 Oslo Cup. The following week, they won the 2024 Stu Sells Oakville Tankard, defeating Kayla Skrlik in the final. They also reached the semifinals at both the 2024 Women's Masters Basel and the 2024 Stu Sells Toronto Tankard in October 2024. Despite losing the Swiss qualifier for the 2024 European Curling Championships to Team Tirinzoni, they bounced back with three consecutive tour victories at the S3 Group Curling Stadium Series, the 2024 Western Showdown and the Mercure Perth Masters. In the new year, they advanced to another final at the 2025 International Bernese Ladies Cup before being beaten by the Tirinzoni rink. At the Swiss championship, Team Schwaller went 4–1 through the round robin before beating Tirinzoni in the 1 vs. 2 game, advancing to the best-of-three final against Corrie Hürlimann. After winning the first game, the team suffered consecutive losses to finish with the silver medal. They ended their season at the Sun City Cup where they made their eighth final, losing to Isabella Wranå. In addition to the tour, Team Schwaller competed in all five Slam events during the season, however, were unsuccessful in qualifying at all of them.

During the 2025–26 season, Team Schwaller continued their success on tour as they rose to number four in the world rankings. This began with early season victories at both the 2025 Oslo Cup and the 2025 AMJ Campbell Shorty Jenkins Classic. They also won the Take-Out Trophy in December and reached the semifinals at the 2025 Autumn Gold Curling Classic and the Red Deer Curling Classic. Team Schwaller would also improve in their performance at the Grand Slam events, qualifying for the playoffs in three events, and making the semifinals at the 2025 Tour Challenge and the 2025 GSOC Tahoe, losing in both semifinals to compatriots Tirinzoni. However, they would beat Tirinzoni at the 2026 Swiss Curling Championships, beating Tirinzoni 2–1 in the best-of-three final. This would qualify the team to represent Switzerland at the 2026 World Women's Curling Championship, their first World Women's Curling Championship. There, they would impressively finish the round robin with an 11–1 record, finishing in first place and earning a bye to the semifinals. They then beat Sweden in the semifinals, and then Canada's Kerri Einarson 7–5 in the final to win their first World Women's title. Also during the season, the team announced they would be staying together through the 2029–30 season with the goal of representing Switzerland at the 2030 Winter Olympics.

== Personal life ==
Rieder is employed as a health specialist.

== Teams ==
Season	Skip	Third	Second	Lead	Alternate
2018–19	Fabienne Rieder	Selina Gafner	Nadine Rieder	Larissa Rubin	Selina Rychiger
2019–20	Fabienne Rieder	Selina Gafner	Tina Zürcher	Nadine Rieder	Selina Rychiger
2020–21	Fabienne Rieder	Xenia Schwaller	Tina Zürcher	Selina Rychiger	Nadine Rieder
2021–22	Fabienne Rieder	Tina Zürcher	Laurane Flückiger	Selina Rychiger	
2022–23	Xenia Schwaller	Fabienne Rieder	Marion Wüest	Selina Gafner	Selina Rychiger
2023–24	Xenia Schwaller	Selina Gafner	Fabienne Rieder	Selina Rychiger	Marion Wüest
2024–25	Xenia Schwaller	Selina Gafner	Fabienne Rieder	Selina Rychiger	
2025–26	Xenia Schwaller	Selina Gafner	Fabienne Rieder	Selina Rychiger	
2026–27	Xenia Schwaller	Selina Gafner	Fabienne Rieder	Selina Rychiger	
