= 2021 Oakville Labour Day Classic =

- Host city: Oakville, Ontario
- Arena: Oakville Curling Club
- Dates: September 3–6
- Men's winner: (Ontario) Team Jacobs
- Curling club: Soo Curlers Association, Sault Ste. Marie
- Skip: Brad Jacobs
- Third: Marc Kennedy
- Second: E. J. Harnden
- Lead: Ryan Harnden
- Finalist: (Ontario) Team Beuk
- Women's winner: (Manitoba) Team Fleury
- Curling club: East St. Paul CC, East St. Paul
- Skip: Tracy Fleury
- Third: Selena Njegovan
- Second: Liz Fyfe
- Lead: Kristin MacCuish
- Coach: Sherry Middaugh
- Finalist: (Prince Edward Island) Suzanne Birt

The 2021 Oakville Labour Day Classic was held from September 3 to 6 at the Oakville Curling Club in Oakville, Ontario. The total purse for the event was $15,000 on the men's side and $20,000 on the women's side.

Team Jacobs, consisting of Brad Jacobs, Marc Kennedy, E. J. Harnden and Ryan Harnden won the men's event, defeating the Jonathan Beuk rink skipped by Tanner Horgan in the final which only went four ends. Jacobs blanked the first end before taking a big score of five in the second. Beuk followed this up with a score of two in the third but ultimately shook hands after a score of three by Jacobs in the fourth. Jacobs received $6,000 for their win while Beuk took home $3,000. To reach the final, Jacobs finished 5–0 through the round robin and knocked off Tyler Tardi 6–3 in the semifinal. Beuk also earned a direct bye to the semifinal, finishing 4–1 through the preliminary stage. They then bested the Glenn Howard rink in the semifinal 3–2 in a rematch of the 2021 Oakville Fall Classic final, held the week prior.

Team Fleury won the women's event, edging out the Suzanne Birt rink 8–7 in the final. It wasn't an easy win for the Fleury rink, consisting of Tracy Fleury, Selena Njegovan, Liz Fyfe and Kristin MacCuish, as they came back from a 7–4 deficit after six ends to claim the title. Birt began with hammer and opened the scoring with a huge three points. The teams then traded singles before Fleury scored a deuce and stole in the fifth to level the score. Birt responded immediately with three in the sixth, giving them a comfortable three point lead heading into the seventh end. Fleury rallied back again, however, nailing a double takeout to even the score 7–7 heading into the last end. On her last shot, Suzanne Birt needed a draw to the button to secure the win, however, she came up heavy, resulting in a steal of one for Fleury and the victory. Fleury received $7,000 for their win with Birt earning $3,500 for second place. Heading into the final, Fleury and Birt shared identical 6–0 records, both finishing the round robin with 4–0 records and winning their quarterfinal and semifinal matches.

== Men ==
=== Teams ===
The teams are listed as follows:

Skip	Third	Second	Lead	Alternate	Locale
Tanner Horgan (Note: As regular skip Jonathan Beuk was away for the event, third Tanner Horgan skipped the team and alternate Jacob Horgan moved to third.)	Jacob Horgan	Wesley Forget	Scott Chadwick		Kingston, Ontario
Jed Brundidge	Evan Workin	Lance Wheeler	Cameron Rittenour		(United States) Saint Paul, Minnesota
Jason Camm	Matthew Hall	Cameron Goodkey	Jordie Lyon-Hatcher		Navan, Ontario
Robert Desjardins	Francois Gionest	Pierre-Luc Morissette	Marc-Alexandre Dion		Saguenay, Quebec
John Epping	Ryan Fry	Mat Camm	Brent Laing		Toronto, Ontario
Colton Flasch	Catlin Schneider	Kevin Marsh	Dan Marsh		Saskatoon, Saskatchewan
Glenn Howard	Scott Howard	David Mathers	Tim March		Penetanguishene, Ontario
Brad Jacobs	Marc Kennedy	E. J. Harnden	Ryan Harnden		Sault Ste. Marie, Ontario
Mike McEwen	Reid Carruthers	Derek Samagalski	Colin Hodgson		Winnipeg, Manitoba
Sam Steep	Adam Vincent	Oliver Campbell	Thomas Ryan	Doug Thomson	Seaforth, Ontario
Karsten Sturmay	Tristan Steinke	Chris Kennedy	Glenn Venance		Edmonton, Alberta
Tyler Tardi	Sterling Middleton	Jason Ginter	Jordan Tardi		Langley, British Columbia

=== Round-robin standings ===
Final round-robin standings

Key
Teams to Playoffs

Pool A	W	L	PF	PA
(Ontario) Brad Jacobs	5	0	31	20
(Ontario) Glenn Howard	4	1	38	15
(Saskatchewan) Colton Flasch	2	3	23	32
(Alberta) Karsten Sturmay	2	3	21	24
(Quebec) Robert Desjardins	1	4	22	33
(United States) Jed Brundidge	1	4	21	32

Pool B	W	L	PF	PA
(Ontario) Team Beuk	4	1	32	22
(British Columbia) Tyler Tardi	4	1	31	22
(Manitoba) Mike McEwen	3	2	30	21
(Ontario) John Epping	3	2	24	19
(Ontario) Jason Camm	1	4	23	37
(Ontario) Sam Steep	0	5	15	35

=== Round-robin results ===
All draw times are listed in Eastern Time (UTC−04:00).

==== Draw 2 ====
Friday, September 3, 6:00 pm

Sheet 2	1	2	3	4	5	6	7	8	Final
(Ontario) John Epping 🔨	0	0	1	0	1	0	3	2	7
(Ontario) Sam Steep	0	0	0	2	0	1	0	0	3

Sheet 3	1	2	3	4	5	6	7	8	Final
(Manitoba) Mike McEwen	1	0	3	0	1	2	2	X	9
(Ontario) Jason Camm 🔨	0	2	0	1	0	0	0	X	3

Sheet 4	1	2	3	4	5	6	7	8	Final
(Ontario) Team Beuk 🔨	0	3	0	0	0	2	0	X	5
(British Columbia) Tyler Tardi	1	0	1	1	1	0	5	X	9

Sheet 5	1	2	3	4	5	6	7	8	Final
(Ontario) Glenn Howard 🔨	0	2	0	0	3	0	1	X	6
(Alberta) Karsten Sturmay	0	0	0	1	0	1	0	X	2

Sheet 6	1	2	3	4	5	6	7	8	Final
(Saskatchewan) Colton Flasch 🔨	0	1	1	0	0	1	0	X	3
(United States) Jed Brundidge	0	0	0	1	2	0	5	X	8

Sheet 7	1	2	3	4	5	6	7	8	Final
(Ontario) Brad Jacobs	1	0	1	1	0	3	0	0	6
(Quebec) Robert Desjardins 🔨	0	1	0	0	2	0	1	1	5

==== Draw 4 ====
Saturday, September 4, 10:00 am

Sheet 2	1	2	3	4	5	6	7	8	Final
(Saskatchewan) Colton Flasch	0	1	0	2	0	X	X	X	3
(Ontario) Glenn Howard 🔨	1	0	4	0	4	X	X	X	9

Sheet 3	1	2	3	4	5	6	7	8	Final
(Ontario) Brad Jacobs 🔨	0	0	2	0	3	2	X	X	7
(United States) Jed Brundidge	0	0	0	1	0	0	X	X	1

Sheet 5	1	2	3	4	5	6	7	8	Final
(Manitoba) Mike McEwen	1	0	1	0	2	0	0	X	4
(Ontario) Team Beuk 🔨	0	2	0	2	0	1	2	X	7

Sheet 6	1	2	3	4	5	6	7	8	Final
(British Columbia) Tyler Tardi	3	0	0	0	2	0	0	1	6
(Ontario) Sam Steep 🔨	0	0	1	1	0	2	1	0	5

Sheet 7	1	2	3	4	5	6	7	8	Final
(Ontario) John Epping 🔨	2	0	0	3	0	0	0	3	8
(Ontario) Jason Camm	0	0	1	0	2	1	2	0	6

Sheet 8	1	2	3	4	5	6	7	8	Final
(Alberta) Karsten Sturmay 🔨	1	1	0	1	1	0	1	X	5
(Quebec) Robert Desjardins	0	0	1	0	0	1	0	X	2

==== Draw 6 ====
Saturday, September 4, 5:30 pm

Sheet 1	1	2	3	4	5	6	7	8	Final
(Ontario) Team Beuk 🔨	0	0	3	0	3	0	3	X	9
(Ontario) Jason Camm	0	2	0	2	0	1	0	X	5

Sheet 3	1	2	3	4	5	6	7	8	Final
(Ontario) John Epping 🔨	1	0	0	2	0	0	2	X	5
(British Columbia) Tyler Tardi	0	0	0	0	1	0	0	X	1

Sheet 4	1	2	3	4	5	6	7	8	Final
(Manitoba) Mike McEwen 🔨	2	0	2	3	0	X	X	X	7
(Ontario) Sam Steep	0	1	0	0	1	X	X	X	2

Sheet 5	1	2	3	4	5	6	7	8	Final
(Saskatchewan) Colton Flasch	0	1	0	2	0	2	0	1	6
(Quebec) Robert Desjardins 🔨	1	0	1	0	2	0	1	0	5

Sheet 6	1	2	3	4	5	6	7	8	Final
(Ontario) Brad Jacobs	0	0	0	3	0	1	0	2	6
(Alberta) Karsten Sturmay 🔨	0	0	1	0	1	0	3	0	5

Sheet 8	1	2	3	4	5	6	7	8	Final
(Ontario) Glenn Howard 🔨	0	5	0	4	X	X	X	X	9
(United States) Jed Brundidge	1	0	1	0	X	X	X	X	2

==== Draw 8 ====
Sunday, September 5, 9:00 am

Sheet 1	1	2	3	4	5	6	7	8	Final
(Ontario) Brad Jacobs 🔨	0	0	1	0	2	0	0	2	5
(Ontario) Glenn Howard	0	2	0	1	0	0	1	0	4

Sheet 2	1	2	3	4	5	6	7	8	9	Final
(United States) Jed Brundidge	0	3	0	0	1	0	0	2	0	6
(Quebec) Robert Desjardins 🔨	1	0	1	2	0	1	1	0	1	7

Sheet 3	1	2	3	4	5	6	7	8	Final
(Saskatchewan) Colton Flasch	0	1	1	0	4	0	X	X	6
(Alberta) Karsten Sturmay 🔨	1	0	0	1	0	1	X	X	3

Sheet 5	1	2	3	4	5	6	7	8	Final
(Ontario) Jason Camm	0	0	3	0	0	3	0	1	7
(Ontario) Sam Steep 🔨	1	0	0	0	1	0	2	0	4

Sheet 7	1	2	3	4	5	6	7	8	9	Final
(Manitoba) Mike McEwen 🔨	2	0	0	0	1	0	0	2	0	5
(British Columbia) Tyler Tardi	0	2	2	0	0	1	0	0	3	8

Sheet 8	1	2	3	4	5	6	7	8	Final
(Ontario) John Epping 🔨	0	0	1	0	1	0	1	0	3
(Ontario) Team Beuk	0	0	0	1	0	2	0	1	4

==== Draw 9 ====
Sunday, September 5, 12:30 pm

Sheet 7	1	2	3	4	5	6	7	8	Final
(Alberta) Karsten Sturmay 🔨	0	2	2	0	0	1	0	1	6
(United States) Jed Brundidge	1	0	0	1	1	0	1	0	4

Sheet 8	1	2	3	4	5	6	7	8	Final
(British Columbia) Tyler Tardi	1	1	0	1	2	0	2	X	7
(Ontario) Jason Camm 🔨	0	0	1	0	0	1	0	X	2

==== Draw 10 ====
Sunday, September 5, 4:00 pm

Sheet 2	1	2	3	4	5	6	7	8	Final
(Ontario) Glenn Howard	1	0	3	2	0	4	X	X	10
(Quebec) Robert Desjardins 🔨	0	1	0	0	2	0	X	X	3

Sheet 3	1	2	3	4	5	6	7	8	Final
(Ontario) Team Beuk 🔨	4	0	1	2	X	X	X	X	7
(Ontario) Sam Steep	0	1	0	0	X	X	X	X	1

Sheet 6	1	2	3	4	5	6	7	8	Final
(Ontario) John Epping	0	0	1	0	0	X	X	X	1
(Manitoba) Mike McEwen 🔨	2	0	0	1	2	X	X	X	5

Sheet 8	1	2	3	4	5	6	7	8	Final
(Ontario) Brad Jacobs 🔨	1	0	2	0	4	0	0	X	7
(Saskatchewan) Colton Flasch	0	2	0	3	0	0	0	X	5

=== Playoffs ===
Quarterfinals
4	(British Columbia) Tyler Tardi	8
5	(Manitoba) Mike McEwen	4
3	(Ontario) Glenn Howard	8
6	(Ontario) John Epping	4

Semifinals
1	(Ontario) Brad Jacobs	6
4	(British Columbia) Tyler Tardi	3
2	(Ontario) Team Beuk	3
3	(Ontario) Glenn Howard	2

Final
1	(Ontario) Brad Jacobs	8
2	(Ontario) Team Beuk	2

==== Quarterfinals ====
Sunday, September 5, 8:00 pm

Sheet 4	1	2	3	4	5	6	7	8	Final
(Ontario) Glenn Howard 🔨	0	2	0	1	0	2	0	3	8
(Ontario) John Epping	1	0	1	0	1	0	1	0	4

Sheet 7	1	2	3	4	5	6	7	8	Final
(British Columbia) Tyler Tardi 🔨	0	2	1	1	0	4	X	X	8
(Manitoba) Mike McEwen	1	0	0	0	3	0	X	X	4

==== Semifinals ====
Monday, September 6, 9:00 am

Sheet 2	1	2	3	4	5	6	7	8	Final
(Ontario) Brad Jacobs 🔨	0	0	0	2	2	0	2	X	6
(British Columbia) Tyler Tardi	0	0	1	0	0	2	0	X	3

Sheet 6	1	2	3	4	5	6	7	8	9	Final
(Ontario) Team Beuk 🔨	1	0	0	1	0	0	0	0	1	3
(Ontario) Glenn Howard	0	0	1	0	1	0	0	0	0	2

==== Final ====
Monday, September 6, 12:30 pm

Sheet 3	1	2	3	4	5	6	7	8	Final
(Ontario) Brad Jacobs 🔨	0	5	0	3	X	X	X	X	8
(Ontario) Team Beuk	0	0	2	0	X	X	X	X	2

== Women ==
=== Teams ===
The teams are listed as follows:

Skip	Third	Second	Lead	Alternate	Locale
Suzanne Birt	Marie Christianson	Meaghan Hughes	Michelle McQuaid		Charlottetown, Prince Edward Island
Thea Coburn	Breanna Rozon	Calissa Daly	Alice Holyoke	Michaela Robert	Toronto, Ontario
Hollie Duncan	Megan Balsdon	Rachelle Strybosch	Tess Bobbie	Julie Tippin	Woodstock, Ontario
Tracy Fleury	Selena Njegovan	Liz Fyfe	Kristin MacCuish		East St. Paul, Manitoba
Jacqueline Harrison	Allison Flaxey	Lynn Kreviazuk	Laura Hickey	Kelly Middaugh	Dundas, Ontario
Lauren Horton	Dominique Jean	Brittany O'Rourke	Pamela Nugent	Lisa Davies	Dollard-des-Ormeaux, Quebec
Jennifer Jones	Kaitlyn Lawes	Jocelyn Peterman	Dawn McEwen	Lisa Weagle	Winnipeg, Manitoba
Mackenzie Kiemele	Katie Ford	Emma McKenzie	Jessica Filipcic	Megan Smith	Niagara Falls, Ontario
Marie-Elaine Little	Abby Deschene	Keira McLaughlin	Zoe Valliere		Sudbury, Ontario
Kayla MacMillan	Jody Maskiewich	Lindsay Dubue	Sarah Loken		Vancouver, British Columbia
Lauren Mann	Kira Brunton	Cheryl Kreviazuk	Karen Trines	Marcia Richardson	Ottawa, Ontario
Jestyn Murphy	Carly Howard	Stephanie Matheson	Grace Holyoke	Janet Murphy	Mississauga, Ontario
Jamie Sinclair	Monica Walker	Cora Farrell	Elizabeth Cousins		(United States) Charlotte, North Carolina
Laurie St-Georges	Cynthia St-Georges (Note: As regular third Hailey Armstrong was away for the event, lead Cynthia St-Georges moved up to third and alternate Isabelle Thiboutot moved to lead.)	Emily Riley	Isabelle Thiboutot		Laval, Quebec
Emma Wallingford	Rhonda Varnes	Melissa Gannon	Kayla Gray		Ottawa, Ontario

=== Round-robin standings ===
Final round-robin standings

Key
Teams to Playoffs

Pool A	W	L	PF	PA
(Manitoba) Tracy Fleury	4	0	30	13
(Ontario) Jacqueline Harrison	2	2	21	22
(Ontario) Thea Coburn	2	2	25	21
(Ontario) Marie-Elaine Little	1	3	19	28
(Quebec) Laurie St-Georges	1	3	16	27

Pool B	W	L	PF	PA
(Manitoba) Jennifer Jones	4	0	28	12
(Ontario) Hollie Duncan	3	1	29	17
(Quebec) Lauren Horton	1	3	17	21
(Ontario) Lauren Mann	1	3	14	31
(Ontario) Emma Wallingford	1	3	16	23

Pool C	W	L	PF	PA
(Prince Edward Island) Suzanne Birt	4	0	32	8
(Ontario) Jestyn Murphy	2	2	17	28
(United States) Jamie Sinclair	2	2	19	14
(Ontario) Mackenzie Kiemele	1	3	15	24
(British Columbia) Kayla MacMillan	1	3	12	21

=== Round-robin results ===
All draw times are listed in Eastern Time (UTC−04:00).

==== Draw 1 ====
Friday, September 3, 3:30 pm

Sheet 1	1	2	3	4	5	6	7	8	Final
(Ontario) Jacqueline Harrison 🔨	1	0	0	0	0	4	0	0	5
(Ontario) Marie-Elaine Little	0	1	2	3	0	0	1	1	8

Sheet 2	1	2	3	4	5	6	7	8	Final
(Quebec) Laurie St-Georges	0	0	3	0	0	1	0	0	4
(Ontario) Thea Coburn 🔨	0	2	0	0	1	0	2	3	8

Sheet 4	1	2	3	4	5	6	7	8	Final
(Ontario) Hollie Duncan	0	1	1	2	0	2	1	X	7
(Ontario) Emma Wallingford 🔨	1	0	0	0	2	0	0	X	3

Sheet 6	1	2	3	4	5	6	7	8	Final
(Ontario) Lauren Mann	1	0	0	0	3	0	3	X	7
(Quebec) Lauren Horton 🔨	0	1	3	0	0	1	0	X	5

Sheet 7	1	2	3	4	5	6	7	8	Final
(United States) Jamie Sinclair	0	0	0	0	1	1	1	1	4
(British Columbia) Kayla MacMillan 🔨	1	0	0	1	0	0	0	0	2

Sheet 8	1	2	3	4	5	6	7	8	9	Final
(Ontario) Jestyn Murphy	0	2	0	4	0	1	0	0	1	8
(Ontario) Mackenzie Kiemele 🔨	2	0	1	0	1	0	1	2	0	7

==== Draw 3 ====
Friday, September 3, 9:00 pm

Sheet 1	1	2	3	4	5	6	7	8	Final
(Manitoba) Jennifer Jones	0	0	3	3	0	2	X	X	8
(Ontario) Lauren Mann 🔨	1	0	0	0	0	0	X	X	1

Sheet 3	1	2	3	4	5	6	7	8	Final
(Ontario) Thea Coburn 🔨	2	0	0	5	0	3	X	X	10
(Ontario) Marie-Elaine Little	0	2	0	0	1	0	X	X	3

Sheet 5	1	2	3	4	5	6	7	8	Final
(Quebec) Lauren Horton	2	0	0	1	2	1	1	X	7
(Ontario) Emma Wallingford 🔨	0	0	2	0	0	0	0	X	2

Sheet 6	1	2	3	4	5	6	7	8	Final
(British Columbia) Kayla MacMillan	0	0	0	2	0	0	2	X	4
(Ontario) Mackenzie Kiemele 🔨	1	0	0	0	0	1	0	X	2

Sheet 7	1	2	3	4	5	6	7	8	Final
(Manitoba) Tracy Fleury 🔨	2	0	1	0	2	4	X	X	9
(Quebec) Laurie St-Georges	0	1	0	1	0	0	X	X	2

Sheet 8	1	2	3	4	5	6	7	8	Final
(Prince Edward Island) Suzanne Birt	3	0	2	1	2	X	X	X	8
(United States) Jamie Sinclair 🔨	0	1	0	0	0	X	X	X	1

==== Draw 5 ====
Saturday, September 4, 2:00 pm

Sheet 1	1	2	3	4	5	6	7	8	Final
(Manitoba) Tracy Fleury 🔨	0	0	6	0	0	2	X	X	8
(Ontario) Thea Coburn	0	1	0	1	1	0	X	X	3

Sheet 2	1	2	3	4	5	6	7	8	Final
(Manitoba) Jennifer Jones 🔨	0	1	0	1	3	2	X	X	7
(Quebec) Lauren Horton	0	0	1	0	0	0	X	X	1

Sheet 3	1	2	3	4	5	6	7	8	Final
(Prince Edward Island) Suzanne Birt 🔨	2	2	0	1	3	0	X	X	8
(British Columbia) Kayla MacMillan	0	0	2	0	0	1	X	X	3

Sheet 4	1	2	3	4	5	6	7	8	Final
(Ontario) Jacqueline Harrison 🔨	0	0	0	2	0	2	0	1	5
(Quebec) Laurie St-Georges	0	1	1	0	1	0	1	0	4

Sheet 5	1	2	3	4	5	6	7	8	Final
(Ontario) Jestyn Murphy	0	0	0	X	X	X	X	X	0
(United States) Jamie Sinclair 🔨	3	3	5	X	X	X	X	X	11

Sheet 7	1	2	3	4	5	6	7	8	Final
(Ontario) Hollie Duncan 🔨	2	2	0	4	0	2	X	X	10
(Ontario) Lauren Mann	0	0	1	0	1	0	X	X	2

==== Draw 7 ====
Saturday, September 4, 9:00 pm

Sheet 2	1	2	3	4	5	6	7	8	Final
(Ontario) Lauren Mann	1	0	2	0	0	1	0	0	4
(Ontario) Emma Wallingford 🔨	0	2	0	2	1	0	1	2	8

Sheet 4	1	2	3	4	5	6	7	8	Final
(United States) Jamie Sinclair	0	1	0	1	1	0	0	0	3
(Ontario) Mackenzie Kiemele 🔨	2	0	1	0	0	0	0	1	4

Sheet 5	1	2	3	4	5	6	7	8	9	Final
(Manitoba) Jennifer Jones 🔨	0	3	1	0	3	0	0	0	1	8
(Ontario) Hollie Duncan	0	0	0	2	0	3	1	1	0	7

Sheet 6	1	2	3	4	5	6	7	8	Final
(Manitoba) Tracy Fleury	1	0	2	0	1	0	0	2	6
(Ontario) Jacqueline Harrison 🔨	0	2	0	1	0	1	1	0	5

Sheet 7	1	2	3	4	5	6	7	8	Final
(Prince Edward Island) Suzanne Birt 🔨	0	2	0	0	3	2	X	X	7
(Ontario) Jestyn Murphy	1	0	0	1	0	0	X	X	2

Sheet 8	1	2	3	4	5	6	7	8	9	Final
(Quebec) Laurie St-Georges	0	1	0	0	2	0	1	1	1	6
(Ontario) Marie-Elaine Little 🔨	1	0	2	1	0	1	0	0	0	5

==== Draw 9 ====
Sunday, September 5, 12:30 pm

Sheet 1	1	2	3	4	5	6	7	8	Final
(Prince Edward Island) Suzanne Birt	2	4	2	0	1	X	X	X	9
(Ontario) Mackenzie Kiemele 🔨	0	0	0	2	0	X	X	X	2

Sheet 2	1	2	3	4	5	6	7	8	Final
(Ontario) Jestyn Murphy 🔨	1	0	3	0	0	1	2	X	7
(British Columbia) Kayla MacMillan	0	2	0	1	0	0	0	X	3

Sheet 3	1	2	3	4	5	6	7	8	Final
(Ontario) Hollie Duncan	0	0	1	0	0	3	0	1	5
(Quebec) Lauren Horton 🔨	0	1	0	1	1	0	1	0	4

Sheet 4	1	2	3	4	5	6	7	8	Final
(Manitoba) Tracy Fleury	0	4	1	1	0	0	1	X	7
(Ontario) Marie-Elaine Little 🔨	2	0	0	0	1	0	0	X	3

Sheet 5	1	2	3	4	5	6	7	8	Final
(Ontario) Jacqueline Harrison	1	2	0	0	2	0	1	X	6
(Ontario) Thea Coburn 🔨	0	0	2	1	0	1	0	X	4

Sheet 6	1	2	3	4	5	6	7	8	Final
(Manitoba) Jennifer Jones 🔨	1	2	0	0	1	1	0	X	5
(Ontario) Emma Wallingford	0	0	0	1	0	0	2	X	3

=== Playoffs ===
Quarterfinals
1	(Manitoba) Tracy Fleury	5
8	(United States) Jamie Sinclair	4
4	(Ontario) Hollie Duncan	7
5	(Ontario) Jacqueline Harrison	2
2	(Manitoba) Jennifer Jones	7
7	(Ontario) Jestyn Murphy	2
3	(Prince Edward Island) Suzanne Birt	5
6	(Ontario) Thea Coburn	4

Semifinals
1	(Manitoba) Tracy Fleury	7
4	(Ontario) Hollie Duncan	6
2	(Manitoba) Jennifer Jones	5
3	(Prince Edward Island) Suzanne Birt	6

Final
1	(Manitoba) Tracy Fleury	8
3	(Prince Edward Island) Suzanne Birt	7

==== Quarterfinals ====
Sunday, September 5, 8:00 pm

Sheet 2	1	2	3	4	5	6	7	8	Final
(Manitoba) Tracy Fleury 🔨	0	0	2	2	0	0	0	1	5
(United States) Jamie Sinclair	0	0	0	0	2	0	2	0	4

Sheet 3	1	2	3	4	5	6	7	8	Final
(Manitoba) Jennifer Jones 🔨	2	0	1	0	4	X	X	X	7
(Ontario) Jestyn Murphy	0	1	0	1	0	X	X	X	2

Sheet 6	1	2	3	4	5	6	7	8	Final
(Prince Edward Island) Suzanne Birt 🔨	1	0	0	1	0	2	0	1	5
(Ontario) Thea Coburn	0	1	0	0	2	0	1	0	4

Sheet 8	1	2	3	4	5	6	7	8	Final
(Ontario) Hollie Duncan 🔨	2	1	0	1	0	2	1	X	7
(Ontario) Jacqueline Harrison	0	0	1	0	1	0	0	X	2

==== Semifinals ====
Monday, September 6, 9:00 am

Sheet 4	1	2	3	4	5	6	7	8	Final
(Manitoba) Jennifer Jones	1	0	2	0	0	0	1	1	5
(Prince Edward Island) Suzanne Birt 🔨	0	2	0	2	0	2	0	0	6

Sheet 7	1	2	3	4	5	6	7	8	9	Final
(Manitoba) Tracy Fleury 🔨	0	2	0	3	0	0	1	0	1	7
(Ontario) Hollie Duncan	0	0	2	0	0	2	0	2	0	6

==== Final ====
Monday, September 6, 12:30 pm

Sheet 5	1	2	3	4	5	6	7	8	Final
(Manitoba) Tracy Fleury	0	1	0	2	1	0	3	1	8
(Prince Edward Island) Suzanne Birt 🔨	3	0	1	0	0	3	0	0	7
