= 2023 AMJ Campbell Shorty Jenkins Classic =

- Host city: Cornwall, Ontario
- Arena: Cornwall Curling Centre
- Dates: September 20–24
- Men's winner: (Scotland) Team Whyte
- Curling club: The Peak (Stirling), Stirling
- Skip: Ross Whyte
- Third: Robin Brydone
- Second: Duncan McFadzean
- Lead: Euan Kyle
- Finalist: (Sweden) Niklas Edin
- Women's winner: (Switzerland) Team Tirinzoni
- Curling club: CC Aarau, Aarau
- Skip: Silvana Tirinzoni
- Fourth: Alina Pätz
- Second: Selina Witschonke
- Lead: Carole Howald
- Coach: Pierre Charette
- Finalist: (Japan) Team Yoshimura

The 2023 AMJ Campbell Shorty Jenkins Classic was held from September 20 to 24 at the Cornwall Curling Centre in Cornwall, Ontario. The event was held in a round robin format with a purse of $60,000 on the men's side and $45,000 and women's side. It was the first time the event was held since 2019.

The 2023 event was dominated by the international field, with only four Canadian teams qualifying for the fifteen total playoff spots across the two events. In the men's final, Ross Whyte and his team won their first event after two previous runner-up finishes at the 2023 Euro Super Series and the 2023 Stu Sells Oakville Tankard, stealing one in an extra end against Niklas Edin. On the women's side, four-time reigning world champions Silvana Tirinzoni's Swiss rink continued their dominance with an undefeated 7–0 run to win the event, defeating the previously undefeated Sayaka Yoshimura rink, led by Yuna Kotani in the final.

== Men ==
=== Teams ===
The teams are listed as follows:

Skip	Third	Second	Lead	Alternate	Locale
Steve Allen	Ritchie Gillan	Kevin Rathwell	Rick Allen		Ottawa, Ontario
Félix Asselin	Martin Crête	Émile Asselin	Jean-François Trépanier		Montreal, Quebec
Reid Carruthers	Brad Jacobs	Derek Samagalski	Connor Njegovan		Winnipeg, Manitoba
Denis Cordick	James Grattan	Joel Krats	Doug McDermot		Halton, Ontario
James Craik	Mark Watt	Angus Bryce	Blair Haswell		Forfar, Scotland
Robert Desjardins	François Gionest	Pierre-Luc Morissette	René Dubois		Saguenay, Quebec
Niklas Edin	Oskar Eriksson	Rasmus Wranå	Christoffer Sundgren		Karlstad, Sweden
John Epping	Mat Camm	Pat Janssen	Jason Camm		Toronto, Ontario
Pat Ferris	Landan Rooney	Connor Duhaime	Robert Currie	Evan Lilly	Grimsby, Ontario
Brad Gushue	Mark Nichols	E. J. Harnden	Geoff Walker		St. John's, Newfoundland and Labrador
Simon Hebert	François Halle	Shane McRae	Simon-Olivier Hebert		Valleyfield, Quebec
Tanner Horgan	Jacob Horgan	Ian McMillan	Scott Chadwick	Joey Hart	Sudbury, Ontario
Glenn Howard	Scott Howard	David Mathers	Tim March		Penetanguishene, Ontario
Sam Mooibroek	Scott Mitchell	Nathan Steele	Colin Schnurr	Wyatt Small	Whitby, Ontario
Bruce Mouat	Grant Hardie	Bobby Lammie	Hammy McMillan Jr.		Stirling, Scotland
Christopher Oka					Ottawa, Ontario
Owen Purcell	Ryan Abraham	Scott Saccary	Adam McEachren		Halifax, Nova Scotia
Joël Retornaz	Amos Mosaner	Sebastiano Arman	Mattia Giovanella		Trentino, Italy
Go Aoki (Fourth)	Hayato Sato (Skip)	Kouki Ogiwara	Kazushi Nino	Ayato Sasaki	Sapporo, Japan
John Shuster	Chris Plys	Matt Hamilton	John Landsteiner	Colin Hufman	(United States) Duluth, Minnesota
Cameron Goodkey (Fourth)	Sam Steep (Skip)	Thomas Ryan	Adam Vincent		Kitchener–Waterloo, Ontario
Yves Stocker	Kim Schwaller	Felix Eberhard	Tom Winkelhausen		Zug, Switzerland
Stuart Thompson	Cameron MacKenzie	Travis Colter	Phil Crowell		Halifax, Nova Scotia
Ross Whyte	Robin Brydone	Duncan McFadzean	Euan Kyle		Stirling, Scotland

=== Round robin standings ===
Final Round Robin Standings

Key
Teams to Playoffs

Pool A	W	L	PF	PA
(Scotland) James Craik	4	1	34	19
(Newfoundland and Labrador) Brad Gushue	4	1	34	20
(Nova Scotia) Owen Purcell	3	2	30	22
(Ontario) John Epping	2	3	25	30
(Quebec) Simon Hebert	1	4	20	36
(Japan) Hayato Sato	1	4	18	34

Pool B	W	L	PF	PA
(Scotland) Bruce Mouat	5	0	38	12
(Quebec) Félix Asselin	4	1	31	20
(United States) John Shuster	3	2	31	24
(Quebec) Robert Desjardins	2	3	20	36
(Ontario) Glenn Howard	1	4	19	25
(Ontario) Denis Cordick	0	5	14	36

Pool C	W	L	PF	PA
(Sweden) Niklas Edin	4	1	33	18
(Manitoba) Reid Carruthers	4	1	37	17
(Switzerland) Yves Stocker	4	1	30	17
(Ontario) Pat Ferris	2	3	20	32
(Ontario) Sam Steep	1	4	18	27
(Ontario) Christopher Oka	0	5	12	39

Pool D	W	L	PF	PA
(Italy) Joël Retornaz	5	0	35	17
(Scotland) Ross Whyte	4	1	31	12
(Nova Scotia) Stuart Thompson	3	2	19	28
(Ontario) Steve Allen	1	4	23	33
(Ontario) Tanner Horgan	1	4	23	30
(Ontario) Sam Mooibroek	1	4	23	34

=== Round robin results ===
All draw times are listed in Eastern Time (UTC−04:00).

==== Draw 1 ====
Wednesday, September 20, 2:00 pm

Sheet 1	1	2	3	4	5	6	7	8	Final
(Scotland) James Craik	0	0	2	0	1	1	1	1	6
(Nova Scotia) Owen Purcell	1	1	0	2	0	0	0	0	4

Sheet 2	1	2	3	4	5	6	7	8	Final
(Ontario) John Epping	0	2	1	0	1	0	2	X	6
(Japan) Hayato Sato	0	0	0	1	0	1	0	X	2

Sheet 4	1	2	3	4	5	6	7	8	Final
(Sweden) Niklas Edin	0	0	0	1	0	X	X	X	1
(Switzerland) Yves Stocker	0	1	1	0	4	X	X	X	6

Sheet 5	1	2	3	4	5	6	7	8	Final
(Italy) Joël Retornaz	0	1	0	2	1	0	0	1	5
(Scotland) Ross Whyte	2	0	1	0	0	0	0	0	3

==== Draw 2 ====
Wednesday, September 20, 6:00 pm

Sheet 4	1	2	3	4	5	6	7	8	Final
(Manitoba) Reid Carruthers	0	1	1	5	3	X	X	X	10
(Ontario) Christopher Oka	0	0	0	0	0	X	X	X	0

Sheet 5	1	2	3	4	5	6	7	8	Final
(Scotland) Bruce Mouat	2	0	3	0	0	4	X	X	9
(United States) John Shuster	0	3	0	1	0	0	X	X	4

==== Draw 3 ====
Wednesday, September 20, 9:00 pm

Sheet 3	1	2	3	4	5	6	7	8	Final
(Ontario) Tanner Horgan	0	0	0	2	0	0	2	0	4
(Nova Scotia) Stuart Thompson	0	1	1	0	1	1	0	1	5

Sheet 4	1	2	3	4	5	6	7	8	Final
(Ontario) John Epping	0	0	1	1	0	0	X	X	2
(Nova Scotia) Owen Purcell	0	2	0	0	3	2	X	X	7

Sheet 6	1	2	3	4	5	6	7	8	9	Final
(Scotland) James Craik	2	0	2	0	0	0	1	0	4	9
(Japan) Hayato Sato	0	2	0	1	1	0	0	1	0	5

==== Draw 4 ====
Thursday, September 21, 8:00 am

Sheet 1	1	2	3	4	5	6	7	8	Final
(Sweden) Niklas Edin	3	0	5	0	X	X	X	X	8
(Ontario) Christopher Oka	0	1	0	2	X	X	X	X	3

Sheet 4	1	2	3	4	5	6	7	8	Final
(Ontario) Pat Ferris	0	0	2	0	2	2	0	X	6
(Ontario) Sam Steep	1	0	0	2	0	0	1	X	4

Sheet 5	1	2	3	4	5	6	7	8	Final
(Ontario) Sam Mooibroek	0	2	0	0	1	1	0	2	6
(Ontario) Steve Allen	1	0	2	1	0	0	3	0	7

==== Draw 5 ====
Thursday, September 21, 11:00 am

Sheet 1	1	2	3	4	5	6	7	8	Final
(Newfoundland and Labrador) Brad Gushue	2	2	2	0	0	1	X	X	7
(Quebec) Simon Hebert	0	0	0	1	1	0	X	X	2

Sheet 2	1	2	3	4	5	6	7	8	Final
(Quebec) Félix Asselin	2	0	1	0	4	0	X	X	7
(Quebec) Robert Desjardins	0	0	0	2	0	0	X	X	2

Sheet 6	1	2	3	4	5	6	7	8	Final
(Italy) Joël Retornaz	2	0	0	2	0	2	0	1	7
(Ontario) Tanner Horgan	0	3	0	0	2	0	1	0	6

==== Draw 6 ====
Thursday, September 21, 2:00 pm

Sheet 1	1	2	3	4	5	6	7	8	Final
(Ontario) Pat Ferris	1	0	1	0	1	1	0	X	4
(Switzerland) Yves Stocker	0	2	0	4	0	0	1	X	7

Sheet 3	1	2	3	4	5	6	7	8	Final
(Scotland) James Craik	2	0	5	2	X	X	X	X	9
(Ontario) John Epping	0	1	0	0	X	X	X	X	1

Sheet 6	1	2	3	4	5	6	7	8	Final
(Ontario) Sam Mooibroek	0	1	0	0	3	0	1	0	5
(Nova Scotia) Stuart Thompson	1	0	2	0	0	1	0	2	6

==== Draw 7 ====
Thursday, September 21, 5:00 pm

Sheet 3	1	2	3	4	5	6	7	8	Final
(Scotland) Ross Whyte	2	0	2	0	0	4	X	X	8
(Ontario) Steve Allen	0	1	0	1	1	0	X	X	3

Sheet 4	1	2	3	4	5	6	7	8	Final
(Japan) Hayato Sato	0	0	1	0	0	0	X	X	1
(Quebec) Simon Hebert	1	1	0	2	1	2	X	X	7

Sheet 5	1	2	3	4	5	6	7	8	Final
(Quebec) Félix Asselin	0	0	1	1	1	2	0	X	5
(Ontario) Denis Cordick	1	1	0	0	0	0	1	X	3

==== Draw 8 ====
Thursday, September 21, 8:00 pm

Sheet 2	1	2	3	4	5	6	7	8	Final
(Scotland) Bruce Mouat	1	0	1	0	0	4	X	X	6
(Ontario) Glenn Howard	0	1	0	1	0	0	X	X	2

Sheet 3	1	2	3	4	5	6	7	8	Final
(Switzerland) Yves Stocker	1	4	1	0	X	X	X	X	6
(Ontario) Sam Steep	0	0	0	0	X	X	X	X	0

Sheet 4	1	2	3	4	5	6	7	8	Final
(Newfoundland and Labrador) Brad Gushue	1	0	0	2	0	1	0	X	4
(Nova Scotia) Owen Purcell	0	2	1	0	2	0	3	X	8

Sheet 5	1	2	3	4	5	6	7	8	Final
(Sweden) Niklas Edin	0	2	1	0	3	0	2	X	8
(Manitoba) Reid Carruthers	0	0	0	2	0	2	0	X	4

Sheet 6	1	2	3	4	5	6	7	8	Final
(United States) John Shuster	2	3	0	3	0	1	X	X	9
(Quebec) Robert Desjardins	0	0	1	0	2	0	X	X	3

==== Draw 9 ====
Friday, September 22, 8:00 am

Sheet 5	1	2	3	4	5	6	7	8	Final
(Ontario) Pat Ferris	1	3	0	1	0	1	0	X	6
(Ontario) Christopher Oka	0	0	1	0	2	0	1	X	4

Sheet 6	1	2	3	4	5	6	7	8	Final
(Scotland) James Craik	1	2	0	2	0	2	X	X	7
(Quebec) Simon Hebert	0	0	1	0	1	0	X	X	2

==== Draw 10 ====
Friday, September 22, 11:00 am

Sheet 1	1	2	3	4	5	6	7	8	Final
(Scotland) Ross Whyte	2	0	1	0	0	4	X	X	7
(Ontario) Sam Mooibroek	0	0	0	2	0	0	X	X	2

Sheet 2	1	2	3	4	5	6	7	8	Final
(Italy) Joël Retornaz	2	0	2	4	X	X	X	X	8
(Nova Scotia) Stuart Thompson	0	1	0	0	X	X	X	X	1

Sheet 3	1	2	3	4	5	6	7	8	Final
(Scotland) Bruce Mouat	1	0	0	2	0	4	X	X	7
(Ontario) Denis Cordick	0	1	1	0	1	0	X	X	3

Sheet 4	1	2	3	4	5	6	7	8	Final
(Newfoundland and Labrador) Brad Gushue	3	0	0	0	3	0	3	X	9
(Japan) Hayato Sato	0	0	2	1	0	1	0	X	4

Sheet 5	1	2	3	4	5	6	7	8	Final
(Ontario) Glenn Howard	2	0	0	0	0	0	1	0	3
(Quebec) Robert Desjardins	0	1	1	0	2	0	0	1	5

Sheet 6	1	2	3	4	5	6	7	8	Final
(Sweden) Niklas Edin	0	0	2	0	1	0	4	X	7
(Ontario) Sam Steep	1	1	0	1	0	1	0	X	4

==== Draw 11 ====
Friday, September 22, 2:00 pm

Sheet 2	1	2	3	4	5	6	7	8	Final
(Ontario) Tanner Horgan	0	2	0	2	0	2	0	1	7
(Ontario) Steve Allen	1	0	1	0	2	0	1	0	5

==== Draw 12 ====
Friday, September 22, 5:00 pm

Sheet 1	1	2	3	4	5	6	7	8	Final
(Manitoba) Reid Carruthers	0	1	3	0	0	0	0	2	6
(Ontario) Sam Steep	2	0	0	1	0	1	1	0	5

Sheet 2	1	2	3	4	5	6	7	8	Final
(United States) John Shuster	3	1	0	3	X	X	X	X	7
(Ontario) Denis Cordick	0	0	1	0	X	X	X	X	1

Sheet 4	1	2	3	4	5	6	7	8	Final
(Scotland) Ross Whyte	0	0	0	2	0	4	X	X	6
(Nova Scotia) Stuart Thompson	0	0	0	0	1	0	X	X	1

Sheet 5	1	2	3	4	5	6	7	8	Final
(Nova Scotia) Owen Purcell	2	0	3	2	1	0	X	X	8
(Quebec) Simon Hebert	0	2	0	0	0	2	X	X	4

Sheet 6	1	2	3	4	5	6	7	8	Final
(Quebec) Félix Asselin	3	0	1	0	1	1	0	1	7
(Ontario) Glenn Howard	0	1	0	2	0	0	1	0	4

==== Draw 13 ====
Friday, September 22, 8:00 pm

Sheet 1	1	2	3	4	5	6	7	8	Final
(Switzerland) Yves Stocker	1	0	3	0	1	5	X	X	10
(Ontario) Christopher Oka	0	1	0	2	0	0	X	X	3

Sheet 2	1	2	3	4	5	6	7	8	Final
(Scotland) Bruce Mouat	1	2	0	3	3	X	X	X	9
(Quebec) Robert Desjardins	0	0	1	0	0	X	X	X	1

Sheet 4	1	2	3	4	5	6	7	8	Final
(Ontario) Sam Mooibroek	0	3	0	1	2	0	0	0	6
(Ontario) Tanner Horgan	1	0	1	0	0	1	1	1	5

Sheet 5	1	2	3	4	5	6	7	8	Final
(Newfoundland and Labrador) Brad Gushue	1	0	4	2	0	0	X	X	7
(Ontario) John Epping	0	1	0	0	1	1	X	X	3

==== Draw 14 ====
Saturday, September 23, 8:00 am

Sheet 5	1	2	3	4	5	6	7	8	Final
(United States) John Shuster	1	0	1	0	5	X	X	X	7
(Ontario) Glenn Howard	0	1	0	1	0	X	X	X	2

Sheet 6	1	2	3	4	5	6	7	8	Final
(Italy) Joël Retornaz	1	1	1	1	1	0	1	X	6
(Ontario) Steve Allen	0	0	0	0	0	3	0	X	3

==== Draw 15 ====
Saturday, September 23, 11:00 am

Sheet 1	1	2	3	4	5	6	7	8	Final
(Ontario) Sam Steep	2	1	0	1	1	0	X	X	5
(Ontario) Christopher Oka	0	0	1	0	0	1	X	X	2

Sheet 2	1	2	3	4	5	6	7	8	Final
(Manitoba) Reid Carruthers	0	2	0	0	2	0	1	3	8
(Ontario) Pat Ferris	0	0	2	0	0	1	0	0	3

Sheet 3	1	2	3	4	5	6	7	8	Final
(Scotland) Ross Whyte	3	0	2	2	X	X	X	X	7
(Ontario) Tanner Horgan	0	1	0	0	X	X	X	X	1

Sheet 5	1	2	3	4	5	6	7	8	Final
(Quebec) Robert Desjardins	1	2	0	3	0	3	0	X	9
(Ontario) Denis Cordick	0	0	2	0	3	0	2	X	7

==== Draw 16 ====
Saturday, September 23, 2:00 pm

Sheet 2	1	2	3	4	5	6	7	8	Final
(United States) John Shuster	0	0	2	0	2	0	X	X	4
(Quebec) Félix Asselin	1	2	0	2	0	4	X	X	9

==== Draw 17 ====
Saturday, September 23, 5:00 pm

Sheet 1	1	2	3	4	5	6	7	8	Final
(Newfoundland and Labrador) Brad Gushue	0	0	0	1	1	2	0	3	7
(Scotland) James Craik	1	1	1	0	0	0	0	0	3

Sheet 2	1	2	3	4	5	6	7	8	Final
(Ontario) Glenn Howard	0	1	1	1	5	X	X	X	8
(Ontario) Denis Cordick	0	0	0	0	0	X	X	X	0

Sheet 3	1	2	3	4	5	6	7	8	Final
(Nova Scotia) Stuart Thompson	2	1	0	1	0	2	0	X	6
(Ontario) Steve Allen	0	0	1	0	2	0	2	X	5

Sheet 4	1	2	3	4	5	6	7	8	Final
(Sweden) Niklas Edin	2	0	3	4	X	X	X	X	9
(Ontario) Pat Ferris	0	1	0	0	X	X	X	X	1

Sheet 5	1	2	3	4	5	6	7	8	Final
(Ontario) John Epping	0	0	6	2	1	4	X	X	13
(Quebec) Simon Hebert	4	1	0	0	0	0	X	X	5

Sheet 6	1	2	3	4	5	6	7	8	Final
(Manitoba) Reid Carruthers	4	0	5	X	X	X	X	X	9
(Switzerland) Yves Stocker	0	1	0	X	X	X	X	X	1

==== Draw 18 ====
Saturday, September 23, 8:00 pm

Sheet 1	1	2	3	4	5	6	7	8	Final
(Japan) Hayato Sato	1	0	1	0	0	1	0	3	6
(Nova Scotia) Owen Purcell	0	2	0	0	0	0	1	0	3

Sheet 3	1	2	3	4	5	6	7	8	Final
(Italy) Joël Retornaz	2	0	1	0	3	3	X	X	9
(Ontario) Sam Mooibroek	0	2	0	2	0	0	X	X	4

Sheet 4	1	2	3	4	5	6	7	8	Final
(Scotland) Bruce Mouat	4	1	0	0	2	X	X	X	7
(Quebec) Félix Asselin	0	0	1	1	0	X	X	X	2

=== Playoffs ===
Quarterfinals
1	(Italy) Joël Retornaz	6
8	(Manitoba) Reid Carruthers	2
4	(Scotland) James Craik	1
5	(Sweden) Niklas Edin	6
2	(Scotland) Bruce Mouat	5
7	(Quebec) Félix Asselin	7
3	(Scotland) Ross Whyte	9
6	(Newfoundland and Labrador) Brad Gushue	7

Semifinals
1	(Italy) Joël Retornaz	3
5	(Sweden) Niklas Edin	6
7	(Quebec) Félix Asselin	2
3	(Scotland) Ross Whyte	8

Final
5	(Sweden) Niklas Edin	6
3	(Scotland) Ross Whyte	7

==== Quarterfinals ====
Sunday, September 24, 9:00 am

Sheet 1	1	2	3	4	5	6	7	8	Final
(Italy) Joël Retornaz	1	0	2	0	3	X	X	X	6
(Manitoba) Reid Carruthers	0	1	0	1	0	X	X	X	2

Sheet 4	1	2	3	4	5	6	7	8	Final
(Scotland) Ross Whyte	0	2	0	2	4	0	0	1	9
(Newfoundland and Labrador) Brad Gushue	5	0	1	0	0	1	0	0	7

Sheet 5	1	2	3	4	5	6	7	8	Final
(Scotland) James Craik	0	0	1	0	0	0	X	X	1
(Sweden) Niklas Edin	1	1	0	1	2	1	X	X	6

Sheet 6	1	2	3	4	5	6	7	8	Final
(Scotland) Bruce Mouat	2	0	0	1	0	2	0	0	5
(Quebec) Félix Asselin	0	1	0	0	2	0	3	1	7

==== Semifinals ====
Sunday, September 24, 1:00 pm

Sheet 2	1	2	3	4	5	6	7	8	Final
(Italy) Joël Retornaz	1	0	1	0	0	0	1	X	3
(Sweden) Niklas Edin	0	1	0	0	2	3	0	X	6

Sheet 3	1	2	3	4	5	6	7	8	Final
(Quebec) Félix Asselin	0	0	0	2	0	X	X	X	2
(Scotland) Ross Whyte	0	2	2	0	4	X	X	X	8

==== Final ====
Sunday, September 24, 5:00 pm

Sheet 5	1	2	3	4	5	6	7	8	9	Final
(Sweden) Niklas Edin	2	0	0	1	0	2	1	0	0	6
(Scotland) Ross Whyte	0	2	0	0	2	0	0	2	1	7

== Women ==
=== Teams ===
The teams are listed as follows:

Skip	Third	Second	Lead	Alternate	Locale
Courtney Auld	Chrissy Cadorin	Cayla Auld	Melanie Ebach	Leigh Armstrong	Thornhill, Ontario
Gim Eun-ji	Kim Min-ji	Kim Su-ji	Seol Ye-eun	Seol Ye-ji	Uijeongbu, South Korea
Clancy Grandy	Kayla MacMillan	Lindsay Dubue	– (Note: Team Grandy played with three players.)		Vancouver, British Columbia
Ha Seung-youn	Kim Hye-rin	Yang Tae-i	Kim Su-jin		Chuncheon, South Korea
Shelley Hardy	Stephanie Mumford	Jessica Corrado	Stephanie Corrado		Sarnia, Ontario
Jennifer Harvey	Hail Armstrong	Lisa Lalonde	Kelly McLeod		Cornwall, Ontario
Carly Howard	Allison Flaxey	Lynn Kreviazuk	Laura Hickey		Toronto, Ontario
Danielle Inglis	Kira Brunton	Calissa Daly	Cassandra de Groot		Ottawa, Ontario
Jennifer Jones	Karlee Burgess	Emily Zacharias	Lauren Lenentine		Winnipeg, Manitoba
Kim Eun-jung	Kim Kyeong-ae	Kim Cho-hi	Kim Seon-yeong	Kim Yeong-mi	Gangneung, South Korea
Isabelle Ladouceur	Grace Lloyd	Jamie Smith	Rachel Steele		Whitby, Ontario
Lauren Mann	Stephanie Barbeau	Abby Deschene	Candice Jackson		Timmins, Ontario
Rebecca Morrison	Jennifer Dodds	Sophie Sinclair	Sophie Jackson	Gina Aitken	Stirling, Scotland
Erin Morrissey	Erica Hopson	Alicia Krolak	Kim Brown		Ottawa, Ontario
Xenia Schwaller	Selina Gafner	Fabienne Rieder	Selina Rychiger	Marion Wüest	Zurich, Switzerland
Laurie St-Georges	Jamie Sinclair	Emily Riley	Kelly Middaugh	Marie-France Larouche	Montreal, Quebec
Alina Pätz (Fourth)	Silvana Tirinzoni (Skip)	Selina Witschonke	Carole Howald		Aarau, Switzerland
Yuna Kotani (Note: As skip Sayaka Yoshimura was on maternity leave, the rest of the team moved up the lineup a position.)	Kaho Onodera	Anna Ohmiya	Mina Kobayashi		Sapporo, Japan

=== Round robin standings ===
Final Round Robin Standings

Key
Teams to Playoffs

Pool A	W	L	PF	PA
(Switzerland) Silvana Tirinzoni	5	0	36	14
(Scotland) Rebecca Morrison	4	1	28	13
(Ontario) Shelley Hardy	2	3	23	33
(Ontario) Jennifer Harvey	2	3	25	35
(Ontario) Isabelle Ladouceur	1	4	20	28
(Ontario) Carly Howard	1	4	25	34

Pool B	W	L	PF	PA
(Japan) Team Yoshimura	5	0	29	14
(South Korea) Gim Eun-ji	4	1	27	13
(Switzerland) Xenia Schwaller	3	2	22	16
(Quebec) Laurie St-Georges	1	4	18	29
(South Korea) Ha Seung-youn	1	4	15	24
(Ontario) Erin Morrissey	1	4	15	30

Pool C	W	L	PF	PA
(South Korea) Kim Eun-jung	5	0	32	11
(British Columbia) Clancy Grandy	4	1	36	20
(Manitoba) Jennifer Jones	3	2	31	20
(Ontario) Danielle Inglis	2	3	31	28
(Ontario) Lauren Mann	1	4	21	42
(Ontario) Courtney Auld	0	5	12	42

=== Round robin results ===
All draw times are listed in Eastern Time (UTC−04:00).

==== Draw 1 ====
Wednesday, September 20, 2:00 pm

Sheet 3	1	2	3	4	5	6	7	8	Final
(South Korea) Ha Seung-youn	0	0	0	2	0	0	0	0	2
(Switzerland) Xenia Schwaller	1	0	1	0	0	1	0	1	4

Sheet 6	1	2	3	4	5	6	7	8	Final
(South Korea) Gim Eun-ji	0	2	0	0	0	0	0	0	2
(Japan) Team Yoshimura	0	0	0	0	1	1	0	2	4

==== Draw 2 ====
Wednesday, September 20, 6:00 pm

Sheet 1	1	2	3	4	5	6	7	8	Final
(Ontario) Isabelle Ladouceur	1	0	0	1	2	0	1	0	5
(Ontario) Jennifer Harvey	0	2	1	0	0	2	0	2	7

Sheet 2	1	2	3	4	5	6	7	8	Final
(Switzerland) Silvana Tirinzoni	0	1	0	0	1	1	0	2	5
(Scotland) Rebecca Morrison	1	0	0	2	0	0	1	0	4

Sheet 3	1	2	3	4	5	6	7	8	Final
(British Columbia) Clancy Grandy	4	1	0	1	0	5	X	X	11
(Ontario) Lauren Mann	0	0	1	0	1	0	X	X	2

Sheet 6	1	2	3	4	5	6	7	8	Final
(South Korea) Kim Eun-jung	0	0	1	1	0	0	0	2	4
(Ontario) Danielle Inglis	0	1	0	0	1	1	0	0	3

==== Draw 3 ====
Wednesday, September 20, 9:00 pm

Sheet 1	1	2	3	4	5	6	7	8	9	Final
(South Korea) Gim Eun-ji	0	0	0	1	0	0	2	0	1	4
(Switzerland) Xenia Schwaller	0	0	0	0	0	2	0	1	0	3

Sheet 2	1	2	3	4	5	6	7	8	9	Final
(Quebec) Laurie St-Georges	1	0	1	0	0	1	1	1	2	7
(Ontario) Erin Morrissey	0	2	0	2	1	0	0	0	0	5

Sheet 5	1	2	3	4	5	6	7	8	Final
(South Korea) Ha Seung-youn	1	0	1	0	1	1	0	0	4
(Japan) Team Yoshimura	0	0	0	2	0	0	2	1	5

==== Draw 4 ====
Thursday, September 21, 8:00 am

Sheet 2	1	2	3	4	5	6	7	8	Final
(Ontario) Carly Howard	0	3	0	1	0	0	2	2	8
(Ontario) Shelley Hardy	1	0	2	0	2	1	0	0	6

Sheet 3	1	2	3	4	5	6	7	8	Final
(Manitoba) Jennifer Jones	0	0	1	0	0	0	0	X	1
(South Korea) Kim Eun-jung	2	1	0	0	1	1	2	X	7

Sheet 6	1	2	3	4	5	6	7	8	Final
(Switzerland) Silvana Tirinzoni	2	0	2	0	6	X	X	X	10
(Ontario) Jennifer Harvey	0	1	0	2	0	X	X	X	3

==== Draw 5 ====
Thursday, September 21, 11:00 am

Sheet 3	1	2	3	4	5	6	7	8	Final
(South Korea) Gim Eun-ji	1	0	0	1	0	0	3	X	5
(Ontario) Erin Morrissey	0	0	1	0	1	0	0	X	2

Sheet 4	1	2	3	4	5	6	7	8	Final
(Scotland) Rebecca Morrison	1	0	1	0	0	0	2	1	5
(Ontario) Isabelle Ladouceur	0	1	0	1	0	0	0	0	2

Sheet 5	1	2	3	4	5	6	7	8	9	Final
(Ontario) Danielle Inglis	0	2	0	1	1	0	3	0	3	10
(Ontario) Lauren Mann	2	0	1	0	0	1	0	3	0	7

==== Draw 6 ====
Thursday, September 21, 2:00 pm

Sheet 2	1	2	3	4	5	6	7	8	Final
(Japan) Team Yoshimura	0	0	1	0	3	1	0	1	6
(Switzerland) Xenia Schwaller	0	1	0	1	0	0	1	0	3

Sheet 4	1	2	3	4	5	6	7	8	Final
(South Korea) Kim Eun-jung	0	4	0	1	0	1	0	X	6
(Ontario) Courtney Auld	1	0	1	0	1	0	1	X	4

Sheet 5	1	2	3	4	5	6	7	8	Final
(Manitoba) Jennifer Jones	0	0	2	0	3	0	2	0	7
(British Columbia) Clancy Grandy	1	2	0	1	0	2	0	3	9

==== Draw 7 ====
Thursday, September 21, 5:00 pm

Sheet 1	1	2	3	4	5	6	7	8	Final
(South Korea) Ha Seung-youn	1	0	1	0	0	0	0	0	2
(Ontario) Erin Morrissey	0	0	0	0	1	2	0	1	4

Sheet 2	1	2	3	4	5	6	7	8	Final
(Switzerland) Silvana Tirinzoni	2	0	1	0	0	2	3	X	8
(Ontario) Shelley Hardy	0	1	0	1	0	0	0	X	2

Sheet 6	1	2	3	4	5	6	7	8	Final
(Ontario) Isabelle Ladouceur	0	1	0	2	0	3	1	X	7
(Ontario) Carly Howard	0	0	1	0	2	0	0	X	3

==== Draw 8 ====
Thursday, September 21, 8:00 pm

Sheet 1	1	2	3	4	5	6	7	8	Final
(Japan) Team Yoshimura	1	1	0	0	1	1	2	X	6
(Quebec) Laurie St-Georges	0	0	2	1	0	0	0	X	3

==== Draw 9 ====
Friday, September 22, 8:00 am

Sheet 1	1	2	3	4	5	6	7	8	Final
(British Columbia) Clancy Grandy	0	0	1	0	0	X	X	X	1
(South Korea) Kim Eun-jung	0	0	0	4	2	X	X	X	6

Sheet 2	1	2	3	4	5	6	7	8	Final
(Manitoba) Jennifer Jones	1	2	0	1	3	X	X	X	7
(Ontario) Courtney Auld	0	0	1	0	0	X	X	X	1

Sheet 3	1	2	3	4	5	6	7	8	Final
(Scotland) Rebecca Morrison	2	1	1	2	2	X	X	X	8
(Ontario) Shelley Hardy	0	0	0	0	0	X	X	X	0

Sheet 4	1	2	3	4	5	6	7	8	Final
(Ontario) Carly Howard	1	2	0	3	0	0	0	0	6
(Ontario) Jennifer Harvey	0	0	2	0	1	1	2	3	9

==== Draw 11 ====
Friday, September 22, 2:00 pm

Sheet 1	1	2	3	4	5	6	7	8	Final
(Ontario) Danielle Inglis	0	2	0	3	0	2	4	X	11
(Ontario) Courtney Auld	1	0	2	0	1	0	0	X	4

Sheet 3	1	2	3	4	5	6	7	8	Final
(Switzerland) Silvana Tirinzoni	0	3	1	0	1	0	2	X	7
(Ontario) Carly Howard	0	0	0	1	0	3	0	X	4

Sheet 4	1	2	3	4	5	6	7	8	Final
(Ontario) Isabelle Ladouceur	0	1	0	2	0	0	2	0	5
(Ontario) Shelley Hardy	2	0	1	0	1	1	0	2	7

Sheet 5	1	2	3	4	5	6	7	8	Final
(South Korea) Gim Eun-ji	0	1	1	0	2	3	2	X	9
(Quebec) Laurie St-Georges	0	0	0	2	0	0	0	X	2

Sheet 6	1	2	3	4	5	6	7	8	Final
(Manitoba) Jennifer Jones	2	3	2	0	2	X	X	X	9
(Ontario) Lauren Mann	0	0	0	1	0	X	X	X	1

==== Draw 12 ====
Friday, September 22, 5:00 pm

Sheet 3	1	2	3	4	5	6	7	8	Final
(Switzerland) Xenia Schwaller	0	1	1	0	2	4	X	X	8
(Ontario) Erin Morrissey	0	0	0	2	0	0	X	X	2

==== Draw 13 ====
Friday, September 22, 8:00 pm

Sheet 3	1	2	3	4	5	6	7	8	Final
(Ontario) Courtney Auld	3	0	0	0	0	0	0	X	3
(Ontario) Lauren Mann	0	1	0	1	1	3	3	X	9

Sheet 6	1	2	3	4	5	6	7	8	Final
(South Korea) Ha Seung-youn	1	0	1	0	2	0	0	1	5
(Quebec) Laurie St-Georges	0	1	0	1	0	1	1	0	4

==== Draw 14 ====
Saturday, September 23, 8:00 am

Sheet 1	1	2	3	4	5	6	7	8	Final
(British Columbia) Clancy Grandy	0	1	1	0	2	1	0	1	6
(Ontario) Danielle Inglis	1	0	0	3	0	0	1	0	5

Sheet 2	1	2	3	4	5	6	7	8	9	Final
(Scotland) Rebecca Morrison	1	0	0	2	0	0	1	0	1	5
(Ontario) Carly Howard	0	0	1	0	1	1	0	1	0	4

Sheet 3	1	2	3	4	5	6	7	8	Final
(Ontario) Shelley Hardy	0	1	0	2	0	1	2	2	8
(Ontario) Jennifer Harvey	0	0	2	0	2	0	0	0	4

Sheet 4	1	2	3	4	5	6	7	8	Final
(Japan) Team Yoshimura	2	2	1	0	3	X	X	X	8
(Ontario) Erin Morrissey	0	0	0	2	0	X	X	X	2

==== Draw 15 ====
Saturday, September 23, 11:00 am

Sheet 4	1	2	3	4	5	6	7	8	Final
(South Korea) Gim Eun-ji	0	3	0	4	0	X	X	X	7
(South Korea) Ha Seung-youn	0	0	1	0	1	X	X	X	2

Sheet 6	1	2	3	4	5	6	7	8	Final
(South Korea) Kim Eun-jung	2	0	2	0	3	2	X	X	9
(Ontario) Lauren Mann	0	1	0	1	0	0	X	X	2

==== Draw 16 ====
Saturday, September 23, 2:00 pm

Sheet 1	1	2	3	4	5	6	7	8	Final
(Scotland) Rebecca Morrison	0	4	1	0	1	0	X	X	6
(Ontario) Jennifer Harvey	0	0	0	1	0	1	X	X	2

Sheet 3	1	2	3	4	5	6	7	8	Final
(British Columbia) Clancy Grandy	1	2	2	4	X	X	X	X	9
(Ontario) Courtney Auld	0	0	0	0	X	X	X	X	0

Sheet 4	1	2	3	4	5	6	7	8	Final
(Switzerland) Xenia Schwaller	2	1	1	0	0	0	X	X	4
(Quebec) Laurie St-Georges	0	0	0	1	0	1	X	X	2

Sheet 5	1	2	3	4	5	6	7	8	Final
(Manitoba) Jennifer Jones	1	0	2	2	1	1	X	X	7
(Ontario) Danielle Inglis	0	2	0	0	0	0	X	X	2

Sheet 6	1	2	3	4	5	6	7	8	Final
(Switzerland) Silvana Tirinzoni	0	2	0	1	2	1	X	X	6
(Ontario) Isabelle Ladouceur	0	0	1	0	0	0	X	X	1

=== Playoffs ===
Quarterfinals
4	(Scotland) Rebecca Morrison	5
5	(South Korea) Gim Eun-ji	3
2	(South Korea) Kim Eun-jung	3
7	(Switzerland) Xenia Schwaller	6
3	(Japan) Team Yoshimura	7
6	(British Columbia) Clancy Grandy	2

Semifinals
1	(Switzerland) Silvana Tirinzoni	8
4	(Scotland) Rebecca Morrison	6
7	(Switzerland) Xenia Schwaller	4
3	(Japan) Team Yoshimura	7

Final
1	(Switzerland) Silvana Tirinzoni	8
3	(Japan) Team Yoshimura	4

==== Quarterfinals ====
Saturday, September 23, 8:00 pm

Sheet 2	1	2	3	4	5	6	7	8	Final
(Scotland) Rebecca Morrison	0	1	0	0	0	2	0	2	5
(South Korea) Gim Eun-ji	1	0	1	0	0	0	1	0	3

Sheet 5	1	2	3	4	5	6	7	8	Final
(Japan) Team Yoshimura	2	0	1	1	1	0	2	X	7
(British Columbia) Clancy Grandy	0	1	0	0	0	1	0	X	2

Sheet 6	1	2	3	4	5	6	7	8	Final
(South Korea) Kim Eun-jung	0	2	0	0	1	0	0	0	3
(Switzerland) Xenia Schwaller	0	0	3	0	0	0	1	2	6

==== Semifinals ====
Sunday, September 24, 9:00 am

Sheet 2	1	2	3	4	5	6	7	8	Final
(Switzerland) Xenia Schwaller	0	0	0	2	0	0	2	X	4
(Japan) Team Yoshimura	1	3	0	0	0	3	0	X	7

Sheet 3	1	2	3	4	5	6	7	8	Final
(Switzerland) Silvana Tirinzoni	0	1	0	0	2	1	0	4	8
(Scotland) Rebecca Morrison	1	0	0	1	0	0	4	0	6

==== Final ====
Sunday, September 24, 1:00 pm

Sheet 5	1	2	3	4	5	6	7	8	Final
(Switzerland) Silvana Tirinzoni	0	0	2	0	1	0	4	1	8
(Japan) Team Yoshimura	0	1	0	1	0	2	0	0	4
