= 2023 Quebec Scotties Tournament of Hearts =

- Host city: Alma, Quebec
- Arena: Centre Sportif Mistouk d'Alma
- Dates: January 10–14
- Winner: Team St-Georges
- Curling club: CC Laval-sur-le-Lac, Laval & Glenmore CC, Dollard-des-Ormeaux
- Skip: Laurie St-Georges
- Third: Emily Riley
- Second: Alanna Routledge
- Lead: Kelly Middaugh
- Alternate: Émilie Desjardins
- Coach: Michel St-Georges
- Finalist: Lauren Horton

The 2023 Quebec Scotties Tournament of Hearts, the provincial women's curling championship of Quebec, was held from January 10 to 14 at the Centre Sportif Mistouk d'Alma in Alma, Quebec. The winning Laurie St-Georges rink represented Quebec at the 2023 Scotties Tournament of Hearts in Kamloops, British Columbia, and finished in a four-way tie for second (seeded third) in Pool A with a 5–3 record, losing the tiebreaker game to British Columbia 8–3 for a spot in the Championship round. The event was held in conjunction with the 2023 Quebec Tankard, the provincial men's curling championship.

It was the first provincial title for St-Georges, though it will be her third national Scotties appearance, as Curling Quebec appointed her as the province's representative for the previous two national championships, as the Quebec Scotties had been cancelled due to the COVID-19 pandemic in Quebec.

== Teams ==
The teams are listed as follows:

| Skip | Third | Second | Lead | Alternate | Club(s) |
|---|---|---|---|---|---|
| Lauren Horton | Hannah Gargul | Brittany O'Rourke | Pamela Nugent | Lisa Davies | Glenmore/Pointe Claire |
| Dominique Jean | Lauren Cheal | Valerie Tanguay | Laura Girard-Côté | | Montréal-Ouest/Lennoxville/Chicoutimi |
| Isabelle Néron | Ginette Simard | Edith Cottenoir | Veronique Bouchard | Karine Tremblay | Chicoutimi |
| Roxane Perron | Kelly Tremblay | Miriam Perron | Sonia Delisle | | Victoria/Trois-Rivières/Clermont |
| Laurie St-Georges | Emily Riley | Alanna Routledge | Kelly Middaugh | Émilie Desjardins | Glenmore/Laval |
| Noémie Verreault | Nathalie Gagnon | Anne-Sophie Gionest | Sarah Bergeron | | Chicoutimi/Riverbend |

== Round-robin standings ==
Final round-robin standings

Key
| Teams to Playoffs |

| Skip | W | L | PF | PA | EW | EL | BE | SE |
|---|---|---|---|---|---|---|---|---|
| Lauren Horton | 4 | 1 | 41 | 23 | 22 | 17 | 2 | 9 |
| Laurie St-Georges | 4 | 1 | 33 | 17 | 22 | 12 | 5 | 11 |
| Noémie Verreault | 4 | 1 | 37 | 37 | 25 | 23 | 1 | 4 |
| Dominique Jean | 2 | 3 | 34 | 38 | 23 | 20 | 5 | 8 |
| Roxane Perron | 1 | 4 | 28 | 40 | 15 | 23 | 1 | 2 |
| Isabelle Néron | 0 | 5 | 23 | 41 | 13 | 25 | 1 | 2 |

== Round-robin results ==
All draw times are listed in Eastern Time (UTC-05:00).

=== Draw 1 ===
Tuesday, January 10, 8:30 pm

| Sheet B | 1 | 2 | 3 | 4 | 5 | 6 | 7 | 8 | 9 | 10 | Final |
|---|---|---|---|---|---|---|---|---|---|---|---|
| Laurie St-Georges | 2 | 0 | 1 | 2 | 0 | 3 | X | X | X | X | 8 |
| Isabelle Néron | 0 | 0 | 0 | 0 | 2 | 0 | X | X | X | X | 2 |

| Sheet C | 1 | 2 | 3 | 4 | 5 | 6 | 7 | 8 | 9 | 10 | Final |
|---|---|---|---|---|---|---|---|---|---|---|---|
| Lauren Horton | 0 | 2 | 0 | 4 | 1 | 0 | 0 | 1 | 1 | X | 9 |
| Noémie Verreault | 0 | 0 | 2 | 0 | 0 | 1 | 1 | 0 | 0 | X | 4 |

| Sheet D | 1 | 2 | 3 | 4 | 5 | 6 | 7 | 8 | 9 | 10 | Final |
|---|---|---|---|---|---|---|---|---|---|---|---|
| Dominique Jean | 0 | 2 | 0 | 2 | 2 | 0 | 0 | 0 | 1 | 1 | 8 |
| Roxane Perron | 1 | 0 | 3 | 0 | 0 | 0 | 2 | 0 | 0 | 0 | 6 |

=== Draw 2 ===
Wednesday, January 11, 4:00 pm

| Sheet A | 1 | 2 | 3 | 4 | 5 | 6 | 7 | 8 | 9 | 10 | Final |
|---|---|---|---|---|---|---|---|---|---|---|---|
| Laurie St-Georges | 0 | 0 | 2 | 3 | 0 | 1 | 1 | 0 | 1 | X | 8 |
| Dominique Jean | 0 | 2 | 0 | 0 | 0 | 0 | 0 | 2 | 0 | X | 4 |

| Sheet B | 1 | 2 | 3 | 4 | 5 | 6 | 7 | 8 | 9 | 10 | Final |
|---|---|---|---|---|---|---|---|---|---|---|---|
| Lauren Horton | 2 | 1 | 0 | 3 | 2 | 3 | X | X | X | X | 11 |
| Roxane Perron | 0 | 0 | 2 | 0 | 0 | 0 | X | X | X | X | 2 |

| Sheet E | 1 | 2 | 3 | 4 | 5 | 6 | 7 | 8 | 9 | 10 | Final |
|---|---|---|---|---|---|---|---|---|---|---|---|
| Isabelle Néron | 1 | 0 | 0 | 2 | 0 | 0 | 2 | 0 | 1 | 0 | 6 |
| Noémie Verreault | 0 | 1 | 1 | 0 | 3 | 1 | 0 | 1 | 0 | 1 | 8 |

=== Draw 3 ===
Thursday, January 12, 12:15 pm

| Sheet A | 1 | 2 | 3 | 4 | 5 | 6 | 7 | 8 | 9 | 10 | Final |
|---|---|---|---|---|---|---|---|---|---|---|---|
| Isabelle Néron | 0 | 0 | 0 | 2 | 0 | 2 | X | X | X | X | 4 |
| Roxane Perron | 1 | 4 | 2 | 0 | 2 | 0 | X | X | X | X | 9 |

| Sheet D | 1 | 2 | 3 | 4 | 5 | 6 | 7 | 8 | 9 | 10 | 11 | Final |
|---|---|---|---|---|---|---|---|---|---|---|---|---|
| Laurie St-Georges | 0 | 2 | 0 | 0 | 1 | 0 | 2 | 0 | 0 | 1 | 0 | 6 |
| Noémie Verreault | 1 | 0 | 0 | 3 | 0 | 1 | 0 | 1 | 0 | 0 | 1 | 7 |

| Sheet E | 1 | 2 | 3 | 4 | 5 | 6 | 7 | 8 | 9 | 10 | Final |
|---|---|---|---|---|---|---|---|---|---|---|---|
| Lauren Horton | 0 | 0 | 1 | 0 | 2 | 0 | 2 | 0 | 2 | 3 | 10 |
| Dominique Jean | 2 | 1 | 0 | 2 | 0 | 1 | 0 | 2 | 0 | 0 | 8 |

=== Draw 4 ===
Thursday, January 12, 8:00 pm

| Sheet B | 1 | 2 | 3 | 4 | 5 | 6 | 7 | 8 | 9 | 10 | Final |
|---|---|---|---|---|---|---|---|---|---|---|---|
| Laurie St-Georges | 0 | 0 | 0 | 1 | 0 | 0 | 0 | 1 | 1 | 1 | 4 |
| Lauren Horton | 0 | 0 | 0 | 0 | 0 | 1 | 1 | 0 | 0 | 0 | 2 |

| Sheet C | 1 | 2 | 3 | 4 | 5 | 6 | 7 | 8 | 9 | 10 | Final |
|---|---|---|---|---|---|---|---|---|---|---|---|
| Dominique Jean | 1 | 1 | 1 | 2 | 0 | 1 | 0 | 0 | 0 | 1 | 7 |
| Isabelle Néron | 0 | 0 | 0 | 0 | 5 | 0 | 1 | 0 | 0 | 0 | 6 |

| Sheet E | 1 | 2 | 3 | 4 | 5 | 6 | 7 | 8 | 9 | 10 | 11 | Final |
|---|---|---|---|---|---|---|---|---|---|---|---|---|
| Noémie Verreault | 2 | 0 | 1 | 0 | 3 | 0 | 1 | 0 | 2 | 0 | 1 | 10 |
| Roxane Perron | 0 | 1 | 0 | 1 | 0 | 2 | 0 | 2 | 0 | 3 | 0 | 9 |

=== Draw 5 ===
Friday, January 13, 12:15 pm

| Sheet B | 1 | 2 | 3 | 4 | 5 | 6 | 7 | 8 | 9 | 10 | 11 | Final |
|---|---|---|---|---|---|---|---|---|---|---|---|---|
| Dominique Jean | 1 | 0 | 3 | 0 | 1 | 0 | 0 | 1 | 0 | 1 | 0 | 7 |
| Noémie Verreault | 0 | 1 | 0 | 2 | 0 | 2 | 0 | 0 | 2 | 0 | 1 | 8 |

| Sheet C | 1 | 2 | 3 | 4 | 5 | 6 | 7 | 8 | 9 | 10 | Final |
|---|---|---|---|---|---|---|---|---|---|---|---|
| Laurie St-Georges | 1 | 1 | 0 | 2 | 2 | 1 | 0 | X | X | X | 7 |
| Roxane Perron | 0 | 0 | 1 | 0 | 0 | 0 | 1 | X | X | X | 2 |

| Sheet D | 1 | 2 | 3 | 4 | 5 | 6 | 7 | 8 | 9 | 10 | Final |
|---|---|---|---|---|---|---|---|---|---|---|---|
| Lauren Horton | 1 | 0 | 0 | 1 | 1 | 0 | 2 | 0 | 4 | X | 9 |
| Isabelle Néron | 0 | 1 | 1 | 0 | 0 | 1 | 0 | 2 | 0 | X | 5 |

== Playoffs ==
| Semifinal | | | Final |
| | | | 1 | Lauren Horton | 3 |
| 2 | Laurie St-Georges | 8 | 2 | Laurie St-Georges | 4 |
| 3 | Noémie Verrault | 6 |

=== Semifinal ===
Friday, January 13, 8:00 pm

| Sheet C | 1 | 2 | 3 | 4 | 5 | 6 | 7 | 8 | 9 | 10 | Final |
|---|---|---|---|---|---|---|---|---|---|---|---|
| Laurie St-Georges | 1 | 0 | 0 | 2 | 3 | 0 | 0 | 1 | 0 | 1 | 8 |
| Noémie Verrault | 0 | 0 | 1 | 0 | 0 | 1 | 2 | 0 | 2 | 0 | 6 |

=== Final ===
Saturday, January 14, 6:30 pm

| Sheet C | 1 | 2 | 3 | 4 | 5 | 6 | 7 | 8 | 9 | 10 | 11 | Final |
|---|---|---|---|---|---|---|---|---|---|---|---|---|
| Lauren Horton | 0 | 0 | 0 | 0 | 0 | 1 | 0 | 1 | 0 | 1 | 0 | 3 |
| Laurie St-Georges | 0 | 0 | 0 | 1 | 0 | 0 | 1 | 0 | 1 | 0 | 1 | 4 |

2023 Quebec Scotties Tournament of Hearts

Laurie St-Georges
1st Quebec Provincial Championship title
