= 2019 Canadian Junior Curling Championships – Women's tournament =

2019 Canadian Junior Curling Championships Women's tournament
- Host city: Prince Albert, Saskatchewan
- Arena: Art Hauser Centre; Prince Albert Golf & Curling Club
- Dates: January 19–27
- Winner: Alberta
- Curling club: Saville Community Sports Centre
- Skip: Selena Sturmay
- Third: Abby Marks
- Second: Kate Goodhelpsen
- Lead: Paige Papley
- Coach: Amanda St-Laurent
- Finalist: British Columbia (Sarah Daniels)

The women's tournament of the 2019 New Holland Canadian Junior Curling Championships was held from January 19 to 27 at the Art Hauser Centre and the Prince Albert Golf & Curling Club.

== Teams ==
The teams are listed as follows:

Province / Territory	Skip	Third	Second	Lead	Club(s)
Alberta	Selena Sturmay	Abby Marks	Kate Goodhelpsen	Paige Papley	Saville Community Sports Centre
British Columbia	Sarah Daniels	Kayla MacMillan	Jessica Humphries	Sarah Loken	Delta Thistle Curling Club
Manitoba	Mackenzie Zacharias	Lauren Kuzyk	Emily Zacharias	Caitlyn Labossiere	Elmwood Curling Club
New Brunswick	Justine Comeau	Emma Le Blanc	Brigitte Comeau	Keira McLaughlin	Capital Winter Club
Newfoundland and Labrador	Mackenzie Glynn	Katie Follett	Sarah Chaytor	Camille Burt	St. John's Curling Club
Northern Ontario	Kira Brunton	Megan Smith	Sara Guy	Kate Sherry	Curl Sudbury
Northwest Territories	Tyanna Bain	Pearl Gillis	Mataya Gillis	Adrianna Hendrick	Inuvik Curling Club
Nova Scotia	Kaitlyn Jones	Lauren Lenentine	Karlee Burgess	Lindsey Burgess	Halifax Curling Club
Nunavut	Sadie Pinksen	Christianne West	Kaitlin MacDonald	Abigail Atienza	Iqaluit Curling Club
Ontario	Thea Coburn	Kaelyn Gregory	Calissa Daly	Alice Holyoke	Dundas Valley Golf & Curling Club
Prince Edward Island	Lauren Ferguson	Katie Shaw	Alexis Burris	Lexie Murray	Cornwall Curling Club
Quebec	Laurie St-Georges	Cynthia St-Georges	Emily Riley	Noemie Gauthier	Club de curling Laval-sur-le-Lac
Saskatchewan	Rachel Erickson	Sara England	Sara Hoag	Jade Goebel	Callie Curling Club
Saskatchewan (Host)	Skylar Ackerman	Madison Johnson	Chantel Hoag	Samantha McLaren	Moose Jaw Ford Curling Club

== Round-robin standings ==
Key
Teams to championship pool
Teams to tiebreakers

Pool A	Skip	W	L
Alberta	Selena Sturmay	6	0
British Columbia	Sarah Daniels	5	1
Nova Scotia	Kaitlyn Jones	4	2
Northern Ontario	Kira Brunton	3	3
Ontario	Thea Coburn	2	4
Saskatchewan (Host)	Skylar Ackerman	1	5
Nunavut	Sadie Pinksen	0	6

Pool B	Skip	W	L
Manitoba	Mackenzie Zacharias	5	1
Quebec	Laurie St-Georges	5	1
New Brunswick	Justine Comeau	4	2
Saskatchewan	Rachel Erickson	4	2
Newfoundland and Labrador	Mackenzie Glynn	2	4
Prince Edward Island	Lauren Ferguson	1	5
Northwest Territories	Tyanna Bain	0	6

== Round-robin results ==
All draw times are listed in Eastern Standard Time (UTC−5:00).

=== Pool A ===
==== Draw 2 ====
Saturday, January 19, 15:00

Sheet C	1	2	3	4	5	6	7	8	9	10	Final
Northern Ontario (Brunton) 🔨	0	0	1	0	1	0	0	1	X	X	3
Alberta (Sturmay)	2	2	0	1	0	1	4	0	X	X	10

Sheet G	1	2	3	4	5	6	7	8	9	10	Final
Nunavut (Pinksen)	0	0	0	0	0	0	0	0	X	X	0
British Columbia (Daniels) 🔨	3	0	0	0	2	2	3	4	X	X	14

==== Draw 3 ====
Saturday, January 19, 20:30

Sheet E	1	2	3	4	5	6	7	8	9	10	Final
British Columbia (Daniels) 🔨	3	1	0	1	2	0	4	1	X	X	12
Ontario (Coburn)	0	0	2	0	0	1	0	0	X	X	3

Sheet H	1	2	3	4	5	6	7	8	9	10	Final
Nova Scotia (Jones) 🔨	0	1	1	0	1	0	0	0	3	X	6
Saskatchewan Host (Ackerman)	1	0	0	0	0	0	0	1	0	X	2

==== Draw 4 ====
Sunday, January 20, 10:00

Sheet A	1	2	3	4	5	6	7	8	9	10	Final
Alberta (Sturmay) 🔨	2	2	0	4	0	2	2	2	X	X	14
Nunavut (Pinksen)	0	0	1	0	1	0	0	0	X	X	2

Sheet B	1	2	3	4	5	6	7	8	9	10	Final
Saskatchewan Host (Ackerman)	0	0	1	0	0	0	0	0	0	X	1
Northern Ontario (Brunton) 🔨	1	2	0	1	0	0	1	1	1	X	7

Sheet D	1	2	3	4	5	6	7	8	9	10	Final
Ontario (Coburn)	0	1	0	0	2	1	1	0	0	X	5
Nova Scotia (Jones) 🔨	1	0	3	3	0	0	0	0	1	X	8

==== Draw 5 ====
Sunday, January 20, 15:00

Sheet D	1	2	3	4	5	6	7	8	9	10	Final
Northern Ontario (Brunton)	0	6	1	3	6	0	1	1	X	X	18
Nunavut (Pinksen) 🔨	1	0	0	0	0	1	0	0	X	X	2

==== Draw 6 ====
Sunday, January 20, 20:00

Sheet A	1	2	3	4	5	6	7	8	9	10	Final
Ontario (Coburn)	3	2	0	0	3	0	0	1	0	1	10
Saskatchewan Host (Ackerman) 🔨	0	0	3	1	0	3	1	0	1	0	9

Sheet I	1	2	3	4	5	6	7	8	9	10	Final
Alberta (Sturmay) 🔨	3	0	0	0	2	0	1	1	0	1	8
British Columbia (Daniels)	0	0	1	2	0	1	0	0	2	0	6

==== Draw 7 ====
Monday, January 21, 10:00

Sheet B	1	2	3	4	5	6	7	8	9	10	Final
Nunavut (Pinksen) 🔨	0	1	0	1	0	0	1	0	X	X	3
Ontario (Coburn)	4	0	1	0	1	3	0	3	X	X	12

Sheet C	1	2	3	4	5	6	7	8	9	10	Final
British Columbia (Daniels)	1	0	2	0	0	3	0	1	0	1	8
Nova Scotia (Jones) 🔨	0	1	0	1	2	0	2	0	1	0	7

==== Draw 8 ====
Monday, January 21, 15:00

Sheet E	1	2	3	4	5	6	7	8	9	10	Final
Saskatchewan Host (Ackerman)	0	0	0	0	1	0	1	1	1	X	4
Alberta (Sturmay) 🔨	2	0	2	1	0	2	0	0	0	X	7

Sheet G	1	2	3	4	5	6	7	8	9	10	Final
Nova Scotia (Jones) 🔨	0	2	0	3	0	0	0	1	1	2	9
Northern Ontario (Brunton)	0	0	1	0	1	1	1	0	0	0	4

==== Draw 9 ====
Monday, January 21, 20:00

Sheet D	1	2	3	4	5	6	7	8	9	10	Final
British Columbia (Daniels) 🔨	1	1	3	0	2	0	0	0	1	X	8
Saskatchewan Host (Ackerman)	0	0	0	1	0	1	1	1	0	X	4

Sheet G	1	2	3	4	5	6	7	8	9	10	Final
Alberta (Sturmay)	1	3	0	2	0	0	1	1	X	X	8
Ontario (Coburn) 🔨	0	0	1	0	0	1	0	0	X	X	2

==== Draw 10 ====
Tuesday, January 22, 10:00

Sheet A	1	2	3	4	5	6	7	8	9	10	Final
Northern Ontario (Brunton) 🔨	1	0	0	0	2	0	1	0	0	X	4
British Columbia (Daniels)	0	0	0	2	0	2	0	2	1	X	7

==== Draw 11 ====
Tuesday, January 22, 15:00

Sheet B	1	2	3	4	5	6	7	8	9	10	Final
Nova Scotia (Jones)	0	2	0	0	0	1	1	0	X	X	4
Alberta (Sturmay) 🔨	2	0	2	2	3	0	0	1	X	X	10

Sheet C	1	2	3	4	5	6	7	8	9	10	Final
Saskatchewan Host (Ackerman) 🔨	0	4	2	3	2	1	2	1	X	X	15
Nunavut (Pinksen)	0	0	0	0	0	0	0	0	X	X	0

==== Draw 12 ====
Tuesday, January 22, 20:00

Sheet E	1	2	3	4	5	6	7	8	9	10	Final
Nunavut (Pinksen)	0	0	2	0	0	1	0	X	X	X	3
Nova Scotia (Jones) 🔨	4	3	0	3	4	0	6	X	X	X	20

Sheet I	1	2	3	4	5	6	7	8	9	10	Final
Ontario (Coburn)	0	1	0	0	0	1	0	1	0	X	3
Northern Ontario (Brunton) 🔨	0	0	2	1	0	0	2	0	1	X	6

=== Pool B ===
==== Draw 1 ====
Saturday, January 19, 10:00

Sheet E	1	2	3	4	5	6	7	8	9	10	Final
Quebec (St-Georges) 🔨	0	2	2	0	1	2	0	0	X	X	7
New Brunswick (Comeau)	0	0	0	1	0	1	1	X	X	X	3

==== Draw 2 ====
Saturday, January 19, 15:00

Sheet A	1	2	3	4	5	6	7	8	9	10	Final
Manitoba (Zacharias) 🔨	0	0	3	0	0	3	0	1	0	X	7
Northwest Territories (Bain)	0	0	0	2	0	0	1	0	1	X	4

Sheet B	1	2	3	4	5	6	7	8	9	10	Final
Newfoundland and Labrador (Glynn)	0	2	0	1	0	1	0	1	0	X	5
Saskatchewan (Erickson) 🔨	1	0	2	0	1	0	3	0	3	X	10

Sheet D	1	2	3	4	5	6	7	8	9	10	Final
New Brunswick (Comeau) 🔨	1	0	2	0	1	0	2	1	2	X	9
Prince Edward Island (Ferguson)	0	1	0	2	0	2	0	0	0	X	5

==== Draw 3 ====
Saturday, January 19, 20:30

Sheet C	1	2	3	4	5	6	7	8	9	10	Final
Saskatchewan (Erickson) 🔨	0	0	1	0	1	1	0	0	0	X	3
Manitoba (Zacharias)	0	0	0	2	0	0	2	2	2	X	8

Sheet G	1	2	3	4	5	6	7	8	9	10	Final
Northwest Territories (Bain) 🔨	0	0	0	1	X	X	X	X	X	X	1
Quebec (St-Georges)	2	3	2	0	X	X	X	X	X	X	7

Sheet I	1	2	3	4	5	6	7	8	9	10	Final
Prince Edward Island (Ferguson) 🔨	2	0	0	1	0	1	0	0	X	X	4
Newfoundland and Labrador (Glynn)	0	2	2	0	1	0	2	2	X	X	9

==== Draw 5 ====
Sunday, January 20, 15:00

Sheet B	1	2	3	4	5	6	7	8	9	10	Final
Northwest Territories (Bain)	0	0	0	2	0	0	0	0	X	X	2
New Brunswick (Comeau) 🔨	3	3	1	0	5	2	1	1	X	X	16

Sheet C	1	2	3	4	5	6	7	8	9	10	Final
Quebec (St-Georges)	1	1	1	0	2	0	0	0	0	X	5
Prince Edward Island (Ferguson) 🔨	0	0	0	1	0	0	1	0	1	X	3

Sheet E	1	2	3	4	5	6	7	8	9	10	Final
Newfoundland and Labrador (Glynn)	0	0	0	1	1	1	1	0	3	0	7
Manitoba (Zacharias) 🔨	3	2	0	0	0	0	0	2	0	1	8

==== Draw 6 ====
Sunday, January 20, 20:00

Sheet G	1	2	3	4	5	6	7	8	9	10	Final
Prince Edward Island (Ferguson)	0	0	0	2	0	0	1	0	X	X	3
Saskatchewan (Erickson) 🔨	1	2	1	0	0	2	0	1	X	X	7

==== Draw 8 ====
Monday, January 21, 15:00

Sheet A	1	2	3	4	5	6	7	8	9	10	Final
New Brunswick (Comeau)	0	1	0	1	0	0	3	0	0	1	6
Newfoundland and Labrador (Glynn) 🔨	1	0	0	0	1	1	0	1	1	0	5

Sheet D	1	2	3	4	5	6	7	8	9	10	Final
Saskatchewan (Erickson) 🔨	0	0	1	0	0	0	1	0	0	1	3
Northwest Territories (Bain)	0	0	0	0	0	1	0	1	0	0	2

Sheet H	1	2	3	4	5	6	7	8	9	10	Final
Manitoba (Zacharias) 🔨	0	0	1	0	4	1	2	0	X	X	8
Quebec (St-Georges)	1	0	0	1	0	0	0	2	X	X	4

==== Draw 9 ====
Monday, January 21, 20:00

Sheet A	1	2	3	4	5	6	7	8	9	10	Final
Saskatchewan (Erickson) 🔨	0	0	2	0	1	0	0	2	0	0	5
Quebec (St-Georges)	1	3	0	1	0	0	1	0	0	1	7

Sheet E	1	2	3	4	5	6	7	8	9	10	Final
Northwest Territories (Bain)	0	0	1	2	0	0	2	0	X	X	5
Prince Edward Island (Ferguson) 🔨	2	2	0	0	1	5	0	1	X	X	11

==== Draw 10 ====
Tuesday, January 22, 10:00

Sheet B	1	2	3	4	5	6	7	8	9	10	Final
Prince Edward Island (Ferguson)	0	1	0	0	1	0	1	0	X	X	3
Manitoba (Zacharias) 🔨	4	0	3	0	0	1	0	1	X	X	9

Sheet C	1	2	3	4	5	6	7	8	9	10	Final
Newfoundland and Labrador (Glynn) 🔨	2	0	2	0	2	2	3	0	1	X	12
Northwest Territories (Bain)	0	2	0	1	0	0	0	2	0	X	5

==== Draw 11 ====
Tuesday, January 22, 15:00

Sheet D	1	2	3	4	5	6	7	8	9	10	Final
Quebec (St-Georges) 🔨	0	1	0	0	1	0	0	2	0	1	5
Newfoundland and Labrador (Glynn)	1	0	0	0	0	1	0	0	1	0	3

Sheet I	1	2	3	4	5	6	7	8	9	10	Final
New Brunswick (Comeau) 🔨	1	1	0	0	0	1	1	1	0	X	5
Saskatchewan (Erickson)	0	0	3	2	3	0	0	0	0	X	8

==== Draw 12 ====
Tuesday, January 22, 20:00

Sheet F	1	2	3	4	5	6	7	8	9	10	Final
Manitoba (Zacharias) 🔨	0	1	0	0	2	1	0	1	0	0	5
New Brunswick (Comeau)	0	0	1	1	0	0	1	0	2	1	6

== Placement round ==
=== Seeding pool ===
==== Standings ====
Team	Skip	W	L
Newfoundland and Labrador	Mackenzie Glynn	5	4
Ontario	Thea Coburn	4	5
Northwest Territories	Tyanna Bain	2	7
Prince Edward Island	Lauren Ferguson	2	7
Saskatchewan (Host)	Skylar Ackerman	2	7
Nunavut	Sadie Pinksen	0	9

==== Draw 14 ====
Wednesday, January 23, 14:00

Sheet D	1	2	3	4	5	6	7	8	9	10	Final
Ontario (Coburn) 🔨	1	2	0	3	2	0	1	0	X	X	9
Prince Edward Island (Ferguson)	0	0	1	0	0	1	0	2	X	X	4

Sheet G	1	2	3	4	5	6	7	8	9	10	Final
Saskatchewan Host (Ackerman)	0	0	0	2	0	0	0	1	0	X	3
Newfoundland and Labrador (Glynn) 🔨	0	1	0	0	0	1	1	0	1	X	4

==== Draw 15 ====
Wednesday, January 23, 19:00

Sheet H	1	2	3	4	5	6	7	8	9	10	Final
Nunavut (Pinksen) 🔨	0	3	0	1	0	0	0	2	0	0	6
Northwest Territories (Bain)	0	0	1	0	3	1	1	0	0	1	7

==== Draw 16 ====
Thursday, January 24, 09:00

Sheet D	1	2	3	4	5	6	7	8	9	10	Final
Newfoundland and Labrador (Glynn)	0	2	2	0	2	4	1	2	X	X	13
Nunavut (Pinksen) 🔨	1	0	0	1	0	0	0	0	X	X	2

Sheet G	1	2	3	4	5	6	7	8	9	10	Final
Northwest Territories (Bain)	0	1	1	0	0	0	0	0	X	X	2
Ontario (Coburn) 🔨	2	0	0	2	0	2	0	3	X	X	9

==== Draw 17 ====
Thursday, January 24, 14:00

Sheet H	1	2	3	4	5	6	7	8	9	10	Final
Prince Edward Island (Ferguson) 🔨	0	1	0	2	0	0	1	0	0	X	4
Saskatchewan Host (Ackerman)	0	0	2	0	1	0	0	3	2	X	8

Sheet I	1	2	3	4	5	6	7	8	9	10	Final
Ontario (Coburn) 🔨	0	1	0	0	0	1	0	1	1	0	4
Newfoundland and Labrador (Glynn)	0	0	3	1	1	0	1	0	0	1	7

==== Draw 18 ====
Thursday, January 24, 19:00

Sheet D	1	2	3	4	5	6	7	8	9	10	Final
Saskatchewan Host (Ackerman) 🔨	0	0	0	0	2	0	0	2	0	0	4
Northwest Territories (Bain)	1	0	0	1	0	0	0	0	2	1	5

Sheet G	1	2	3	4	5	6	7	8	9	10	Final
Nunavut (Pinksen) 🔨	0	0	0	2	2	0	0	0	X	X	4
Prince Edward Island (Ferguson)	2	3	1	0	0	3	4	4	X	X	17

=== Championship pool ===
==== Championship pool standings ====
Key
Teams to playoffs
Teams to tiebreakers

Province	Skip	W	L
Alberta	Selena Sturmay	10	0
Nova Scotia	Kaitlyn Jones	7	3
British Columbia	Sarah Daniels	7	3
Quebec	Laurie St-Georges	7	3
Manitoba	Mackenzie Zacharias	6	4
Northern Ontario	Kira Brunton	5	5
Saskatchewan	Rachel Erickson	5	5
New Brunswick	Justine Comeau	5	5

==== Draw 14 ====
Wednesday, January 23, 14:00

Sheet B	1	2	3	4	5	6	7	8	9	10	Final
Manitoba (Zacharias)	1	0	2	0	3	0	0	0	X	X	6
British Columbia (Daniels) 🔨	0	4	0	4	0	2	2	3	X	X	15

Sheet E	1	2	3	4	5	6	7	8	9	10	11	Final
Quebec (St-Georges) 🔨	1	0	0	2	0	2	0	1	0	2	0	8
Alberta (Sturmay)	0	0	3	0	1	0	2	0	2	0	1	9

==== Draw 15 ====
Wednesday, January 23, 19:00

Sheet A	1	2	3	4	5	6	7	8	9	10	Final
Nova Scotia (Jones)	0	0	1	0	1	0	0	0	X	X	2
Saskatchewan (Erickson) 🔨	0	2	0	1	0	0	3	2	X	X	8

Sheet C	1	2	3	4	5	6	7	8	9	10	Final
Northern Ontario (Brunton) 🔨	2	0	1	0	2	0	2	1	X	X	8
New Brunswick (Comeau)	0	1	0	1	0	1	0	0	X	X	3

==== Draw 16 ====
Thursday, January 24, 09:00

Sheet A	1	2	3	4	5	6	7	8	9	10	Final
British Columbia (Daniels) 🔨	0	2	0	0	0	1	1	0	1	X	5
Quebec (St-Georges)	1	0	1	1	1	0	0	3	0	X	7

Sheet E	1	2	3	4	5	6	7	8	9	10	Final
Saskatchewan (Erickson)	0	0	1	0	1	0	1	0	2	X	5
Northern Ontario (Brunton) 🔨	1	3	0	1	0	1	0	2	0	X	8

==== Draw 17 ====
Thursday, January 24, 14:00

Sheet B	1	2	3	4	5	6	7	8	9	10	Final
New Brunswick (Comeau) 🔨	1	0	1	0	0	0	1	1	0	X	4
Nova Scotia (Jones)	0	3	0	1	1	2	0	0	1	X	8

Sheet C	1	2	3	4	5	6	7	8	9	10	Final
Alberta (Sturmay) 🔨	0	2	1	0	0	1	0	0	1	1	6
Manitoba (Zacharias)	1	0	0	0	2	0	0	0	0	0	3

Sheet G	1	2	3	4	5	6	7	8	9	10	Final
Saskatchewan (Erickson) 🔨	0	0	2	1	2	0	0	0	2	0	7
British Columbia (Daniels)	0	4	0	0	0	1	1	1	0	2	9

==== Draw 18 ====
Thursday, January 24, 19:00

Sheet B	1	2	3	4	5	6	7	8	9	10	Final
Northern Ontario (Brunton) 🔨	0	1	0	0	1	1	0	1	0	X	4
Quebec (St-Georges)	1	0	1	3	0	0	1	0	3	X	9

Sheet E	1	2	3	4	5	6	7	8	9	10	Final
Nova Scotia (Jones)	0	2	0	1	0	2	0	1	0	1	7
Manitoba (Zacharias) 🔨	1	0	2	0	1	0	1	0	1	0	6

Sheet H	1	2	3	4	5	6	7	8	9	10	Final
New Brunswick (Comeau)	0	0	2	0	0	0	3	0	1	0	6
Alberta (Sturmay) 🔨	1	0	0	2	1	0	0	2	0	1	7

==== Draw 19 ====
Friday, January 25, 09:00

Sheet B	1	2	3	4	5	6	7	8	9	10	Final
Alberta (Sturmay)	2	1	0	0	2	0	0	2	2	X	9
Saskatchewan (Erickson) 🔨	0	0	0	2	0	2	0	0	0	X	4

Sheet E	1	2	3	4	5	6	7	8	9	10	Final
British Columbia (Daniels) 🔨	1	0	2	0	0	1	0	0	X	X	4
New Brunswick (Comeau)	0	4	0	1	1	0	2	1	X	X	9

Sheet F	1	2	3	4	5	6	7	8	9	10	Final
Quebec (St-Georges) 🔨	0	0	2	1	1	1	0	0	2	1	8
Nova Scotia (Jones)	3	1	0	0	0	0	3	2	0	0	9

Sheet I	1	2	3	4	5	6	7	8	9	10	Final
Manitoba (Zacharias) 🔨	1	3	0	0	1	2	3	1	X	X	11
Northern Ontario (Brunton)	0	0	1	2	0	0	0	0	X	X	3

== Tiebreaker ==
Friday, January 25, 14:00

Sheet C	1	2	3	4	5	6	7	8	9	10	Final
British Columbia (Daniels)	0	1	0	1	0	0	4	0	0	2	8
Quebec (St-Georges) 🔨	0	0	2	0	0	2	0	2	0	0	6

Player percentages
British Columbia		Quebec	
Sarah Loken	84%	Noemie Gauthier	84%
Jessica Humphries	79%	Emily Riley	75%
Kayla MacMillan	89%	Cynthia St-Georges	78%
Sarah Daniels	76%	Laurie St-Georges	79%
Total	82%	Total	79%

== Playoffs ==
Semifinal			Final
			1	Alberta	9
2	Nova Scotia	7	3	British Columbia	6
3	British Columbia	9

=== Semifinal ===
Saturday, January 26, 13:00

Sheet D	1	2	3	4	5	6	7	8	9	10	Final
Nova Scotia (Jones)	0	1	0	2	0	1	1	0	2	0	7
British Columbia (Daniels) 🔨	1	0	4	0	1	0	0	2	0	1	9

Player percentages
Nova Scotia		British Columbia	
Lindsey Burgess	88%	Sarah Loken	89%
Karlee Burgess	88%	Jessica Humphries	83%
Lauren Lenentine	93%	Kayla MacMillan	89%
Kaitlyn Jones	80%	Sarah Daniels	74%
Total	87%	Total	83%

=== Final ===
Sunday, January 27, 10:00

Sheet D	1	2	3	4	5	6	7	8	9	10	Final
Alberta (Sturmay) 🔨	0	1	1	2	1	0	1	0	3	X	9
British Columbia (Daniels)	1	0	0	0	0	2	0	3	0	X	6

Player percentages
Alberta		British Columbia	
Paige Papley	83%	Sarah Loken	91%
Kate Goodhelpsen	79%	Jessica Humphries	71%
Abby Marks	75%	Kayla MacMillan	78%
Selena Sturmay	72%	Sarah Daniels	62%
Total	77%	Total	76%
