= 2021 Oakville Fall Classic =

- Host city: Oakville, Ontario
- Arena: Oakville Curling Club
- Dates: August 27–29
- Men's winner: (Ontario) Team Howard
- Curling club: Penetanguishene CC, Penetanguishene
- Skip: Glenn Howard
- Third: Scott Howard
- Second: David Mathers
- Lead: Tim March
- Finalist: (Ontario) Team Beuk
- Women's winner: (United States) Team Sinclair
- Curling club: Charlotte CA, Charlotte
- Skip: Jamie Sinclair
- Third: Monica Walker
- Second: Cora Farrell
- Lead: Elizabeth Cousins
- Finalist: (Prince Edward Island) Suzanne Birt
- « 2020 (cancelled) 2022 »

The 2021 Oakville Fall Classic was held from August 27 to 29 at the Oakville Curling Club in Oakville, Ontario. It was the fourth men's event and third women's event of the 2021–22 curling season. The total purse for the event was $6,000 on the men's side and $3,800 on the women's sides.

Team Glenn Howard won the men's event, defeating Team Jonathan Beuk (skipped by Tanner Horgan) 6–2 in the final. The game only lasted four ends, with Howard scoring four in the first and two in the third while Beuk could only generate singles in both the second and fourth ends. Down 6–2 without hammer, they conceded. To reach the final, Howard trounced Team Jordan McNamara 9–1 in the quarterfinals and then beat Team Pat Ferris 5–2 in the semifinals. Team Beuk also came through the quarterfinals, defeating Team Rob Ainsley 9–2 and then the previously undefeated Team Mark Kean 6–5 in an extra end semifinal. Team Howard received $2,000 for their win, with Beuk receiving $1,500.

On the women's side, Jamie Sinclair and her rink from the Charlotte, North Carolina defeated the Suzanne Birt rink from Charlottetown, Prince Edward Island 8–6 to claim the title. After trailing 3–0 early, Team Birt scored two points in the third and stole two in the fourth to lead 4–3 at the break. Sinclair then came back with three of her own in the sixth before Birt leveled the score 6–6 with two points in the seventh. Sinclair then scored two in the eighth to win the tournament and the $1,500 winner's purse. Teams Jacqueline Harrison and Laurie St-Georges also qualified for the playoffs, with Harrison losing to Birt 5–4 in one semifinal and St-Georges dropping their game to Sinclair, also 5–4.

== Men ==
=== Teams ===
The teams are listed as follows:

Skip	Third	Second	Lead	Locale
Rob Ainsley	Dave Ellis	Graeme Robson	Darren Karn	Toronto, Ontario
Tanner Horgan (Note: As regular skip Jonathan Beuk was away for the event, third Tanner Horgan skipped the team and alternate Jacob Horgan moved to third.)	Jacob Horgan	Wesley Forget	Scott Chadwick	Kingston, Ontario
Jason Camm	Matthew Hall	Cameron Goodkey	Jordie Lyon-Hatcher	Navan, Ontario
Pat Ferris	Ian Dickie	Connor Duhaime	Zack Shurtleff	Grimsby, Ontario
Glenn Howard	Scott Howard	David Mathers	Tim March	Penetanguishene, Ontario
Mark Kean	Kevin Flewwelling	Ed Cyr	Sean Harrison	Woodstock, Ontario
Yannick Martel	Jean-François Charest	Philippe Brassard	René Dubois	Saguenay, Quebec
Jordan McNamara	Maxime Daigle	John McCutcheon	Brendan Laframboise	Ottawa, Ontario
Sam Mooibroek	Matthew Garner	Brady Lumley	Spencer Dunlop	Kitchener, Ontario
Vincent Roberge	Jean-Michel Arsenault	Jesse Mullen	Julien Tremblay	Saint-Romuald, Quebec
Zackary Wise	Michael Solomon	Robert Derry	Tyler Lachance	Montreal, Quebec

=== Round robin standings ===
Final Round Robin Standings

Key
Teams to Playoffs

Pool A	W	L	PF	PA
(Ontario) Mark Kean	4	0	26	11
(Ontario) Glenn Howard	3	1	24	13
(Ontario) Sam Mooibroek	2	2	24	23
(Quebec) Yannick Martel	1	3	24	28
(Quebec) Vincent Roberge	0	4	14	37

Pool B	W	L	PF	PA
(Ontario) Pat Ferris	3	1	25	19
(Ontario) Rob Ainsley	3	1	25	15
(Ontario) Team Beuk	2	2	20	22
(Ontario) Jordan McNamara	2	2	24	23
(Quebec) Zackary Wise	1	3	14	24
(Ontario) Jason Camm	1	3	18	23

=== Round robin results ===
All draw times are listed in Eastern Time (UTC−04:00).

==== Draw 1 ====
Friday, August 27, 5:30 pm

Sheet 1	1	2	3	4	5	6	7	8	Final
(Ontario) Jordan McNamara	1	0	0	3	0	3	1	X	8
(Quebec) Zackary Wise	0	1	1	0	1	0	0	X	3

Sheet 2	1	2	3	4	5	6	7	8	Final
(Ontario) Glenn Howard	0	1	0	0	1	0	0	1	3
(Ontario) Mark Kean	0	0	2	1	0	1	1	0	5

Sheet 3	1	2	3	4	5	6	7	8	9	Final
(Quebec) Yannick Martel	0	4	0	0	4	0	0	0	0	8
(Ontario) Sam Mooibroek	1	0	1	0	0	3	1	2	2	10

Sheet 5	1	2	3	4	5	6	7	8	Final
(Ontario) Team Beuk	1	0	1	0	2	1	0	0	5
(Ontario) Jason Camm	0	0	0	1	0	0	1	2	4

Sheet 7	1	2	3	4	5	6	7	8	Final
(Ontario) Pat Ferris	0	0	1	0	0	0	0	X	1
(Ontario) Rob Ainsley	0	0	0	3	2	1	1	X	7

==== Draw 2 ====
Friday, August 27, 9:30 pm

Sheet 4	1	2	3	4	5	6	7	8	Final
(Ontario) Glenn Howard	1	0	0	2	1	0	3	X	7
(Quebec) Yannick Martel	0	0	0	0	0	1	0	X	1

Sheet 5	1	2	3	4	5	6	7	8	Final
(Quebec) Vincent Roberge	0	0	0	0	0	X	X	X	0
(Ontario) Mark Kean	0	0	1	5	3	X	X	X	9

Sheet 6	1	2	3	4	5	6	7	8	Final
(Ontario) Team Beuk	0	1	0	1	0	1	0	X	3
(Ontario) Pat Ferris	1	0	1	0	3	0	2	X	7

Sheet 7	1	2	3	4	5	6	7	8	Final
(Ontario) Jason Camm	0	1	0	0	0	1	1	0	3
(Quebec) Zackary Wise	1	0	0	1	1	0	0	1	4

Sheet 8	1	2	3	4	5	6	7	8	Final
(Ontario) Jordan McNamara	1	1	0	0	0	1	0	2	5
(Ontario) Rob Ainsley	0	0	0	2	1	0	1	0	4

==== Draw 3 ====
Saturday, August 28, 10:00 am

Sheet 2	1	2	3	4	5	6	7	8	9	Final
(Ontario) Team Beuk	1	0	1	0	1	0	2	1	0	6
(Ontario) Rob Ainsley	0	2	0	2	0	2	0	0	1	7

Sheet 3	1	2	3	4	5	6	7	8	Final
(Ontario) Pat Ferris	0	2	0	1	0	0	4	1	8
(Ontario) Jason Camm	1	0	1	0	1	1	0	0	4

Sheet 7	1	2	3	4	5	6	7	8	Final
(Quebec) Vincent Roberge	0	0	2	1	0	0	0	X	3
(Ontario) Sam Mooibroek	2	0	0	0	3	2	1	X	8

Sheet 8	1	2	3	4	5	6	7	8	Final
(Ontario) Mark Kean	0	2	1	0	2	0	0	0	5
(Quebec) Yannick Martel	1	0	0	1	0	0	1	1	4

==== Draw 4 ====
Saturday, August 28, 1:30 pm

Sheet 1	1	2	3	4	5	6	7	8	Final
(Ontario) Glenn Howard	0	0	2	0	2	0	1	X	5
(Ontario) Sam Mooibroek	0	0	0	1	0	1	0	X	2

Sheet 2	1	2	3	4	5	6	7	8	Final
(Quebec) Vincent Roberge	0	1	1	2	0	2	0	X	6
(Quebec) Yannick Martel	3	0	0	0	3	0	5	X	11

Sheet 5	1	2	3	4	5	6	7	8	Final
(Ontario) Pat Ferris	3	0	0	2	1	0	2	1	9
(Ontario) Jordan McNamara	0	1	3	0	0	1	0	0	5

Sheet 6	1	2	3	4	5	6	7	8	Final
(Quebec) Zackary Wise	0	1	0	1	0	1	0	X	3
(Ontario) Rob Ainsley	1	0	2	0	2	0	2	X	7

==== Draw 5 ====
Saturday, August 28, 5:30 pm

Sheet 2	1	2	3	4	5	6	7	8	Final
(Ontario) Jason Camm	0	0	0	1	0	4	0	2	7
(Ontario) Jordan McNamara	1	0	2	0	2	0	1	0	6

Sheet 3	1	2	3	4	5	6	7	8	Final
(Ontario) Glenn Howard	0	2	0	1	0	3	1	2	9
(Quebec) Vincent Roberge	2	0	2	0	1	0	0	0	5

Sheet 4	1	2	3	4	5	6	7	8	Final
(Ontario) Team Beuk	0	0	0	3	1	2	0	X	6
(Quebec) Zackary Wise	1	1	1	0	0	0	1	X	4

Sheet 6	1	2	3	4	5	6	7	8	Final
(Ontario) Mark Kean	0	4	0	1	0	0	2	X	7
(Ontario) Sam Mooibroek	1	0	2	0	0	1	0	X	4

=== Playoffs ===
Quarterfinals
4	(Ontario) Rob Ainsley	2
5	(Ontario) Team Beuk	9
3	(Ontario) Glenn Howard	9
6	(Ontario) Jordan McNamara	1

Semifinals
1	(Ontario) Mark Kean	5
5	(Ontario) Team Beuk	6
2	(Ontario) Pat Ferris	2
3	(Ontario) Glenn Howard	5

Final
5	(Ontario) Team Beuk	2
3	(Ontario) Glenn Howard	6

==== Quarterfinals ====
Sunday, August 29, 9:00 am

Sheet 3	1	2	3	4	5	6	7	8	Final
(Ontario) Rob Ainsley	2	0	0	0	0	0	X	X	2
(Ontario) Team Beuk	0	3	0	2	2	2	X	X	9

Sheet 6	1	2	3	4	5	6	7	8	Final
(Ontario) Glenn Howard	3	0	0	1	1	4	X	X	9
(Ontario) Jordan McNamara	0	1	0	0	0	0	X	X	1

==== Semifinals ====
Sunday, August 29, 12:30 pm

Sheet 2	1	2	3	4	5	6	7	8	9	Final
(Ontario) Mark Kean	1	0	1	0	1	0	0	2	0	5
(Ontario) Team Beuk	0	1	0	2	0	2	0	0	1	6

Sheet 7	1	2	3	4	5	6	7	8	Final
(Ontario) Pat Ferris	0	0	0	1	0	1	0	X	2
(Ontario) Glenn Howard	0	0	2	0	1	0	2	X	5

==== Final ====
Sunday, August 29, 3:30 pm

Sheet 4	1	2	3	4	5	6	7	8	Final
(Ontario) Team Beuk	0	1	0	1	X	X	X	X	2
(Ontario) Glenn Howard	4	0	2	0	X	X	X	X	6

== Women ==
=== Teams ===
The teams are listed as follows:

Skip	Third	Second	Lead	Alternate	Locale
Suzanne Birt	Marie Christianson	Meaghan Hughes	Michelle McQuaid		Charlottetown, Prince Edward Island
Jacqueline Harrison	Allison Flaxey	Lynn Kreviazuk	Laura Hickey	Kelly Middaugh	Dundas, Ontario
Erica Hopson	Erin Morrissey	Alicia Krolak	Kim Brown		Ottawa, Ontario
Marie-Elaine Little	Abby Deschene	Keira McLaughlin	Zoe Valliere		Sudbury, Ontario
Jamie Sinclair	Monica Walker	Cora Farrell	Elizabeth Cousins		(United States) Charlotte, North Carolina
Laurie St-Georges	Hailey Armstrong	Emily Riley	Florence Boivin (Note: Florence Boivin spared for Cynthia St-Georges.)		Laval, Quebec
Quinn Walsh	Anneka Burghout	Lindsay Geerkens	Rachel Dobbs		Waterloo, Ontario

=== Round robin standings ===
Final Round Robin Standings

Key
Teams to Playoffs

Team	W	L	PF	PA
(United States) Jamie Sinclair	4	0	27	8
(Ontario) Jacqueline Harrison	3	1	24	15
(Prince Edward Island) Suzanne Birt	3	1	25	13
(Quebec) Laurie St-Georges	2	2	22	19
(Ontario) Erica Hopson	1	3	18	19
(Ontario) Marie-Elaine Little	1	3	20	25
(Ontario) Quinn Walsh	0	4	7	44

=== Round robin results ===
All draw times are listed in Eastern Time (UTC−04:00).

==== Draw 1 ====
Friday, August 27, 5:30 pm

Sheet 4	1	2	3	4	5	6	7	8	Final
(Prince Edward Island) Suzanne Birt	0	0	2	0	2	0	3	X	7
(Quebec) Laurie St-Georges	0	0	0	1	0	2	0	X	3

Sheet 6	1	2	3	4	5	6	7	8	Final
(Ontario) Erica Hopson	2	0	6	5	X	X	X	X	13
(Ontario) Quinn Walsh	0	1	0	0	X	X	X	X	1

Sheet 8	1	2	3	4	5	6	7	8	Final
(Ontario) Jacqueline Harrison	0	0	1	2	0	0	1	X	4
(United States) Jamie Sinclair	3	0	0	0	3	1	0	X	7

==== Draw 2 ====
Friday, August 27, 9:30 pm

Sheet 1	1	2	3	4	5	6	7	8	Final
(Prince Edward Island) Suzanne Birt	2	0	0	2	0	1	3	X	8
(Ontario) Marie-Elaine Little	0	0	2	0	2	0	0	X	4

Sheet 2	1	2	3	4	5	6	7	8	Final
(Ontario) Jacqueline Harrison	2	0	0	2	0	1	1	X	6
(Ontario) Erica Hopson	0	1	1	0	1	0	0	X	3

Sheet 3	1	2	3	4	5	6	7	8	Final
(Quebec) Laurie St-Georges	0	0	0	1	0	X	X	X	1
(United States) Jamie Sinclair	3	0	2	0	1	X	X	X	6

==== Draw 3 ====
Saturday, August 28, 10:00 am

Sheet 4	1	2	3	4	5	6	7	8	Final
(United States) Jamie Sinclair	0	3	4	1	0	X	X	X	8
(Ontario) Marie-Elaine Little	1	0	0	0	1	X	X	X	2

Sheet 5	1	2	3	4	5	6	7	8	Final
(Quebec) Laurie St-Georges	5	1	0	5	0	X	X	X	11
(Ontario) Quinn Walsh	0	0	2	0	1	X	X	X	3

Sheet 6	1	2	3	4	5	6	7	8	Final
(Prince Edward Island) Suzanne Birt	0	1	2	0	0	0	1	0	4
(Ontario) Jacqueline Harrison	2	0	0	1	0	0	0	2	5

==== Draw 4 ====
Saturday, August 28, 1:30 pm

Sheet 3	1	2	3	4	5	6	7	8	Final
(Prince Edward Island) Suzanne Birt	0	1	1	1	0	3	X	X	6
(Ontario) Erica Hopson	0	0	0	0	1	0	X	X	1

Sheet 8	1	2	3	4	5	6	7	8	Final
(Ontario) Marie-Elaine Little	2	4	0	0	3	2	X	X	11
(Ontario) Quinn Walsh	0	0	1	1	0	0	X	X	2

==== Draw 5 ====
Saturday, August 28, 5:30 pm

Sheet 1	1	2	3	4	5	6	7	8	Final
(Ontario) Jacqueline Harrison	4	2	1	0	2	X	X	X	9
(Ontario) Quinn Walsh	0	0	0	1	0	X	X	X	1

Sheet 5	1	2	3	4	5	6	7	8	Final
(United States) Jamie Sinclair	1	2	1	0	2	X	X	X	6
(Ontario) Erica Hopson	0	0	0	1	0	X	X	X	1

Sheet 7	1	2	3	4	5	6	7	8	Final
(Quebec) Laurie St-Georges	0	3	0	1	0	2	1	X	7
(Ontario) Marie-Elaine Little	1	0	1	0	1	0	0	X	3

=== Playoffs ===
Semifinals
1	(United States) Jamie Sinclair	5
4	(Quebec) Laurie St-Georges	4
2	(Ontario) Jacqueline Harrison	4
3	(Prince Edward Island) Suzanne Birt	5

Final
1	(United States) Jamie Sinclair	8
3	(Prince Edward Island) Suzanne Birt	6

==== Semifinals ====
Sunday, August 29, 12:30 pm

Sheet 4	1	2	3	4	5	6	7	8	Final
(United States) Jamie Sinclair	0	0	1	0	1	0	2	1	5
(Quebec) Laurie St-Georges	0	1	0	1	0	2	0	0	4

Sheet 5	1	2	3	4	5	6	7	8	9	Final
(Ontario) Jacqueline Harrison	1	0	0	0	2	0	1	0	0	4
(Prince Edward Island) Suzanne Birt	0	0	1	0	0	1	0	2	1	5

==== Final ====
Sunday, August 29, 3:30 pm

Sheet 3	1	2	3	4	5	6	7	8	Final
(United States) Jamie Sinclair	1	2	0	0	0	3	0	2	8
(Prince Edward Island) Suzanne Birt	0	0	2	2	0	0	2	0	6
