= Florence Boivin =

Canadian curler

- Curler
- Born: Florence Maude Boivin; September 1, 2000 (age 26); La Baie, Quebec

Team
- Curling club: CC Laval-sur-le-Lac, Laval, QC

Curling career
- Member Association: Quebec
- Hearts: 1 (2021)
- Top CTRS ranking: 28th (2019–20)

Florence Boivin (born September 1, 2000) is a Canadian curler from La Baie, Quebec.

== Career ==
Boivin won her sole Quebec Junior Curling Championship title in 2020 playing lead for Noémie Gauthier. This qualified her and teammates Gauthier, Léandra Roberge and Meaghan Rivett for the 2020 Canadian Junior Curling Championships, held January 18 to 26 in Langley, British Columbia. There, the team just qualified for the championship pool with a 3–3 record. They then went 3–1 against the other pool, which qualified them for a tiebreaker against Alberta's Abby Marks. They lost the tiebreaker 8–0, finishing fifth overall for the tournament. Also during her junior career, Boivin played third for Cynthia St-Georges at the 2019 Canadian U18 Curling Championships. The team finished 3–3 after the round robin, just missing the playoffs. Boivin continued to play with Team Gauthier for the 2020–21 season, but was also the alternate for the Laurie St-Georges rink out of Laval. Due to the COVID-19 pandemic in Quebec, the 2021 Quebec Scotties Tournament of Hearts was cancelled. In order to choose which team would represent Quebec at the 2021 Scotties Tournament of Hearts, each team had to send a document presenting their members to curling Quebec, who sent the three best teams to curling Canada. They then decided that the best curling team to represent Quebec was the St-Georges team. The event was played in a bio-secure bubble in Calgary, Alberta to prevent the spread of the virus. At the Hearts, the team surprised many by defeating multiple higher-ranked teams in the tournament including the Wild Card team of Tracy Fleury (skipped by Chelsea Carey), Corryn Brown's British Columbia rink and Suzanne Birt's team out of Prince Edward Island. Ultimately, they finished the event with a 6–6 record and a seventh place finish.

== Personal life ==
Boivin is currently an accounting student at the Université de Sherbrooke.

== Teams ==
Season	Skip	Third	Second	Lead	Alternate
2018–19	Cynthia St-Georges	Florence Boivin	Élizabeth Cyr	Jeanne Gonthier	Stella-Rose Venne
2019–20	Noémie Gauthier	Léandra Roberge	Meaghan Rivett	Florence Boivin	Anna Munroe
2020–21	Noémie Gauthier	Hannah Gargul	Florence Boivin	Mélina Perron	
2020–21	Laurie St-Georges	Hailey Armstrong	Emily Riley	Cynthia St-Georges	Florence Boivin
