= Kelly Middaugh =

Canadian curler

- Curler
- Born: August 2, 1999 (age 27); Midland, Ontario

Team
- Curling club: Barrie CC, Barrie, ON
- Skip: Sherry Middaugh
- Third: Kelly Middaugh
- Second: Emily Middaugh
- Lead: Megan Smith

Curling career
- Member Association: Ontario (2016–2022; 2024–present); Quebec (2022–2024)
- Hearts: 2 (2023, 2024)
- Top CTRS ranking: 20th (2023–24)

Kelly Middaugh (born August 2, 1999) is a Canadian curler from Victoria Harbour, Ontario. She currently plays third on Team Sherry Middaugh.

== Career ==
While attending Wilfrid Laurier University, Middaugh competed in two U Sports/Curling Canada University Curling Championships. In 2018, as second for the team skipped by Kaitlin Jewer, they finished with a 3–4 round robin record, failing to advance to the playoffs. At the 2020 U Sports/Curling Canada University Curling Championships, the team, led by Isabelle Ladouceur, finished in sixth place with a 2–5 record.

During the 2018–19 season, Middaugh played lead for the Emma Wallingford rink. The team competed in one women's event, the Royal LePage Women's Fall Classic, where they were able to find success. After dropping their first two games, the team won four straight sudden death games to qualify for the playoffs. They were then defeated by Isabella Wranå in the quarterfinals. At the 2018 Ontario U-21 Curling Championships, the team qualified for the playoffs with a 4–3 record. They then lost to the eventual champions Thea Coburn 7–6 in the semifinals.

For the 2019–20 season, Middaugh joined the Isabelle Ladouceur rink at lead. At the Ontario junior championship, they failed to reach the playoffs after a 3–4 round robin record. The following season, the team competed in and won the Bally Haly Cash Spiel, posting an undefeated 6–0 record throughout the event. They also competed in The Curling Store Cashspiel and the Lakeshore U21 Junior Women's Spiel, losing in the semifinals of both events to Christina Black and Celia Evans respectively.

After two seasons playing for Team Ladouceur, Middaugh was added to the Jacqueline Harrison rink for the 2021–22 season as their alternate. The team also included third Allison Flaxey, second Lynn Kreviazuk and lead Laura Hickey. The team had a strong start to the season, beginning with a semifinal loss at the 2021 Oakville Fall Classic to Suzanne Birt. They then lost two straight quarterfinal games at the 2021 Oakville Labour Day Classic and Stu Sells Toronto Tankard, both to Hollie Duncan. With their successful results over the season, Team Harrison had enough points to qualify for the 2021 Canadian Olympic Curling Pre-Trials. There, they posted a 5–1 record through the round robin, qualifying for the playoffs. They then beat Suzanne Birt in the A event semifinal before dropping the first final 9–6 to Krista McCarville. They rebounded with a 9–2 victory over Corryn Brown to earn the ninth and final spot in the 2021 Canadian Olympic Curling Trials. Middaugh did not compete in the trials with the team.

== Personal life ==
Middaugh is currently an outdoor educator. She previously attended Algonquin College and Wilfrid Laurier University. She is engaged to Kenny Malcolmson. Her parents Wayne and Sherry are also accomplished curlers.

== Teams ==
| Season | Skip | Third | Second | Lead | Alternate |
|---|---|---|---|---|---|
| 2016–17 | Kaitlin Jewer | Riley Sandham | Kelly Middaugh | Bridget Ribau | Susanna Wright |
| 2017–18 | Kaitlin Jewer | Riley Sandham | Kelly Middaugh | Bridget Ribau | Susanna Wright |
| 2018–19 | Emma Wallingford | Dayna Cullen | Kelsey Cathcart | Kelly Middaugh | |
| 2019–20 | Isabelle Ladouceur | Brooklyn Fahl | Sarah Wallace | Kelly Middaugh | |
| 2020–21 | Isabelle Ladouceur | Jamie Smith | Brooklyn Fahl | Kelly Middaugh | |
| 2021–22 | Jacqueline Harrison | Allison Flaxey | Lynn Kreviazuk | Laura Hickey | Kelly Middaugh |
| 2022–23 | Laurie St-Georges | Emily Riley | Alanna Routledge | Kelly Middaugh | |
| 2023–24 | Laurie St-Georges | Jamie Sinclair | Emily Riley | Kelly Middaugh | Marie-France Larouche |
| 2024–25 | Hollie Duncan | Megan Balsdon | Julie Tippin | Kelly Middaugh | |
| 2025–26 | Katie Ford | Emily Middaugh | Madison Fisher | Kelly Middaugh | |
| 2026–27 | Sherry Middaugh | Kelly Middaugh | Emily Middaugh | Megan Smith | |
