= Emily Riley =

Canadian curler (born 1997)

- Curler
- Born: September 23, 1997 (age 29); Montreal, Quebec

Team
- Curling club: Glenmore CC, Dollard-des-Ormeaux, QC
- Skip: Kate Cameron
- Third: Laurie St-Georges
- Second: Emily Riley
- Lead: Émilia Gagné
- Mixed doubles partner: Jesse Mullen

Curling career
- Member Association: Quebec
- Hearts: 5 (2021, 2022, 2023, 2024, 2025)
- World Mixed Championship: 1 (2023)
- Top CTRS ranking: 12th (2024–25)
Medal record
Curling
Representing Canada
World Mixed Championship
Bronze medal – third place	2023 Aberdeen

Emily Riley (born September 23, 1997) is a Canadian curler from Pincourt, Quebec. She currently plays second on Team Kate Cameron.

== Career ==
Riley is an accomplished junior curler, having participated in three Canadian Junior Curling Championships in 2016, 2018 and 2019. In 2016, her team skipped by Laurie St-Georges, finished the tournament with a 6–4 record, finishing in sixth place. In 2018, her team made it all the way to the final before losing to Nova Scotia's Kaitlyn Jones, earning the silver medal. In her final appearance in 2019, her team lost to British Columbia's Sarah Daniels in a tiebreaker to qualify for the playoff round. Also during the 2018–19 season, Team St-Georges lost in the final of the Curl Mesabi Classic World Curling Tour event.

Riley aged out of juniors the following season and continued playing with Team St-Georges. They competed in their first Grand Slam of Curling event at the 2019 Tour Challenge Tier 2 where they lost in a tiebreaker to Megan Balsdon. Team St-Georges also competed in their first provincial women's championship at the 2020 Quebec Scotties Tournament of Hearts. After finishing the round robin in first place, they lost in the final to Noémie Verreault 3–1.

Due to the COVID-19 pandemic in Quebec, the 2021 Quebec Scotties Tournament of Hearts was cancelled. Since the defending champions, Team Noémie Verreault, had disbanded, Team St-Georges (the 2020 provincial runner-up) was invited to represent Quebec at the 2021 Scotties Tournament of Hearts, which they accepted. The event was played in a bio-secure bubble in Calgary, Alberta to prevent the spread of the virus. At the Hearts, Riley and her teammates received a lot of media attention and fans thanks to their positive attitudes and strong play on the ice. They also defeated multiple higher ranked teams in the tournament including the Wild Card team of Tracy Fleury (skipped by Chelsea Carey), Corryn Brown's British Columbia rink and Suzanne Birt's team out of Prince Edward Island. Ultimately, they finished the event with a 6–6 record and a seventh place finish.

Team St-Georges began the 2021–22 season with a semifinal finish at the 2021 Oakville Fall Classic where they lost to the event winners Team Jamie Sinclair. They only made the playoffs at one other tour event at the Stu Sells 1824 Halifax Classic, losing in the quarterfinals to Team Jill Brothers. Due to the COVID-19 pandemic in Canada, the qualification process for the 2021 Canadian Olympic Curling Trials had to be modified to qualify enough teams for the championship. In these modifications, Curling Canada created the 2021 Canadian Curling Pre-Trials Direct-Entry Event, an event where eight teams would compete to try to earn one of two spots into the 2021 Canadian Olympic Curling Pre-Trials. Team St-Georges qualified for the Pre-Trials Direct-Entry Event as the second seed. The team won their opening match, but then lost three straight games and were eliminated from the event. The Quebec Scotties Tournament of Hearts was again cancelled due to the pandemic and Team St-Georges were once again selected to represent Quebec at the national women's championship. The team could not replicate their successful run from 2021, finishing the 2022 Scotties Tournament of Hearts with a 3–5 record. They won their opening two matches against Alberta's Laura Walker and the Yukon's Hailey Birnie and their last game against Nova Scotia's Christina Black.

Aside from women's curling, Riley competed in the 2019 Canadian Mixed Curling Championship, playing lead for Félix Asselin. The team finished on top of the standings after the championship pool with an 8–2 record before losing in the semifinal to Nova Scotia. They bounced back in the bronze medal game, defeating Ontario for the bronze medal. The team returned to the Canadian Mixed Championship in 2022, winning the event for Quebec. They went on to win the bronze medal at the world mixed curling championships in Aberdeen, Scotland, narrowly defeating Norway 4-3.

== Personal life ==
Riley is currently a mental performance consultant. She studied sports psychology at the University of Ottawa. She is in a relationship with Matt Morin.

== Teams ==
Season	Skip	Third	Second	Lead	Alternate
2015–16	Laurie St-Georges	Cynthia St-Georges	Meaghan Rivett	Emily Riley	Dominique Renaud
2016–17	Laurie St-Georges	Cynthia St-Georges	Meaghan Rivett	Emily Riley	
2017–18	Laurie St-Georges	Cynthia St-Georges	Meaghan Rivett	Emily Riley	Janique Berthelot
2018–19	Laurie St-Georges	Lauren Mann	Cynthia St-Georges	Emily Riley	
2019–20	Laurie St-Georges	Hailey Armstrong	Emily Riley	Cynthia St-Georges	Isabelle Thiboutot
2020–21	Laurie St-Georges	Hailey Armstrong	Emily Riley	Cynthia St-Georges	Florence Boivin
2021–22	Laurie St-Georges	Hailey Armstrong	Emily Riley	Cynthia St-Georges	Isabelle Thiboutot
2022–23	Laurie St-Georges	Emily Riley	Alanna Routledge	Kelly Middaugh	Émilie Desjardins
2023–24	Laurie St-Georges	Jamie Sinclair	Emily Riley	Kelly Middaugh	Marie-France Larouche
2024–25	Laurie St-Georges	Jamie Sinclair	Emily Riley	Lisa Weagle	
2025–26	Laurie St-Georges	Sarah Daniels	Emily Riley	Émilia Gagné	
2026–27	Kate Cameron	Laurie St-Georges	Emily Riley	Émilia Gagné	
