= List of teams in the 2023–24 curling season =

This is a list of the top men's, women's and mixed doubles curling teams of the 2023–24 curling season, sorted by their end of season World Curling ranking.

This list shows the team lineups, their playdown record (provincial or regional championships, national or continental qualifiers), national championship record, world championship record, Grand Slam record (men's and women's only), and other tour events won, plus their end of season World Curling ranking points.

== Men's ==
Team					Playdown record	National championship record	World championship record	Grand Slam record					Other event wins	World Curling team ranking	Points
Skip	Third	Second	Lead	Club/locale	Playdown record	National championship record	World championship record	TC	Nat'l	Mast.	CO	PC	Other event wins	World Curling team ranking	Points
Joël Retornaz	Amos Mosaner	Sebastiano Arman	Mattia Giovanella	Trentino Curling Cembra, Cembra, Italy	4th 9–2 (ECC)	(gold) 6–0 (ITA)	(bronze) 10–5	C	C	C	QF	F	Baden Masters	1st	440.500
Bruce Mouat	Grant Hardie (Note: Hardie missed the Masters as he was recovering from minor surgery. The team played with three players.)	Bobby Lammie	Hammy McMillan Jr.	Curl Edinburgh, Edinburgh, Scotland	(gold) 9–2 (ECC)	(bronze) 7–3 (SCO)	4th 11–4	Q	QF	Q	C	SF	Euro Super Series, Stu Sells Oakville Tankard, Aberdeen International, Perth Masters	2nd	394.000
Brad Gushue	Mark Nichols	E. J. Harnden	Geoff Walker	St. John's CC, St. John's, Newfoundland and Labrador	(gold) 8–1 (PCCC)	(gold) 9–2 (Brier)	(silver) 11–3	SF	Q	QF	SF	C	Karuizawa International	3rd	381.750
Brendan Bottcher	Marc Kennedy	Brett Gallant	Ben Hebert	The Glencoe Club, Calgary, Alberta	–	(bronze) 7–4 (Brier)	–	F	SF	SF	F	Q	Players Open, ATB Okotoks Classic, Saville Shootout	4th	366.750
Ross Whyte	Robin Brydone	Duncan McFadzean	Euan Kyle (Note: Craig Waddell replaced Kyle at the Players' Championship. Kyle was recovering from an injury.)	The Peak (Stirling), Stirling, Scotland	–	(gold) 10–0 (SCO)	–	SF	QF	F	SF	QF	Shorty Jenkins Classic	5th	323.250
Niklas Edin	Oskar Eriksson	Rasmus Wranå	Christoffer Sundgren	Karlstads CK, Karlstad, Sweden	(silver) 7–4 (ECC)	Exempted	(gold) 13–1	QF	F	Q	Q	QF	–	6th	321.750
Benoît Schwarz	Yannick Schwaller (skip)	Sven Michel	Pablo Lachat	CC Genève, Geneva, Switzerland	(bronze) 7–4 (ECC)	(gold) 8–0 (SUI)	7th 6–6	QF	SF	SF	QF	Q	Western Showdown	7th	305.750
Mike McEwen	Colton Flasch	Kevin Marsh	Dan Marsh	Nutana CC, Saskatoon, Saskatchewan	(gold) 7–0 (SK)	(silver) 10–3 (Brier)	–	T2	DNP	Q	Q	SF	Original 16 Cash Spiel	8th	236.875
Matt Dunstone	B. J. Neufeld	Colton Lott	Ryan Harnden	Fort Rouge CC, Winnipeg, Manitoba	–	4th 7–3 (Brier)	–	QF	Q	QF	QF	Q	Soo Curlers Fall Classic	9th	224.250
Kevin Koe	Tyler Tardi	Jacques Gauthier	Karrick Martin	The Glencoe Club, Calgary, Alberta	(silver) 4–2 (AB)	16th 2–6 (Brier)	–	Q	Q	Q	Q	Q	Astec Safety Challenge, Red Deer Curling Classic	10th	209.500
Brad Jacobs (Note: Carruthers began the season skipping the team and throwing fourth rocks. Carruthers and Jacobs switched positions prior to the Masters.)	Reid Carruthers	Derek Samagalski (Note: Scott Howard replaced Samagalski at the Players' Championship as he was attending to the birth of his second child.)	Connor Njegovan	Granite CC, Winnipeg, Manitoba	(gold) 7–2 (MB)	5th 7–3 (Brier)	–	QF	Q	QF	Q	Q	PointsBet Invitational	11th	208.00
James Craik	Mark Watt	Angus Bryce	Blair Haswell	Forfar Indoor Sports, Forfar, Scotland	–	(silver) 7–4 (SCO)	–	T2	QF	Q	QF	Q	Grand Prix Bern Inter	12th	199.750
John Shuster	Chris Plys (Note: Plys did not play at the Tour Challenge. He was replaced as third by Matt Hamilton)	Colin Hufman	Matt Hamilton (Note: Hamilton did not play at the National. The team played with three players at the event.); John Landsteiner (Note: Landsteiner is the team's alternate. He played lead at the World Curling Championships (replacing Hamilton) and at the Tour Challenge (Hamilton played third).)	(United States) Duluth CC, Duluth, Minnesota	–	(gold) 9–1 (USA)	6th 7–6	Q	Q	DNP	DNP	DNP	–	13th	196.250
Michael Brunner	Anthony Petoud	Romano Keller-Meier	Andreas Gerlach	CC Bern Zähringer, Bern, Switzerland	–	(bronze) 5–3 (SUI)	–	T2	DNP	DNP	Q	DNP	–	14th	193.875
Cameron Bryce	Duncan Menzies	Luke Carson	Robin McCall	Border Ice Rink, Kelso, Scotland	–	DNP	–	T2	DNP	Q	DNP	DNP	Swiss Cup Basel, St. Galler Elite Challenge	15th	178.625
Aaron Sluchinski	Jeremy Harty	Kerr Drummond	Dylan Webster	Airdrie CC, Airdrie, Alberta	(gold) 6–1 (AB)	10th 4–4 (Brier)	–	Q	Q	Q	DNP	DNP	Alberta Curling Series Major, Alberta Tour Kick-Off	16th	167.250
Magnus Ramsfjell	Martin Sesaker	Bendik Ramsfjell	Gaute Nepstad	Trondheim CK, Trondheim, Norway	5th 6–3 (ECC)	(bronze) 5–2 (NOR)	10th 4–8	Q	DNP	QF	Q	DNP	–	17th	162.750
Korey Dropkin	Andrew Stopera (skip) (Note: Sopera skipped the team in most events, but not in the US Championship)	Mark Fenner	Thomas Howell	(United States) Duluth CC, Duluth, Minnesota	4th 4–5 (PCCC)	(silver) 6–3 (USA)	–	Q	QF	Q	Q	DNP	–	18th	154.750
Yusuke Morozumi	Yuta Matsumura	Ryotaro Shukuya	Masaki Iwai	Karuizawa CC, Karazuiwa, Japan	–	4th 4–3 (JPN)	–	T2	DNP	DNP	DNP	DNP	Stu Sells Tankard, Wakkanai Midori Challenge Cup, Argo Graphics Cup	19th	154.125
Kyle Waddell	Craig Waddell	Mark Taylor	Gavin Barr	Lanarkshire Ice Rink, Hamilton, Scotland	–	4th 5–4 (SCO)	–	DNP	DNP	DNP	DNP	DNP	–	20th	144.250
Rylan Kleiter	Joshua Mattern	Matthew Hall	Trevor Johnson	Nutana CC, Saskatoon, Saskatchewan	(silver) 6–2 (SK)	–	–	T2	DNP	DNP	DNP	DNP	U25 NextGen Classic	21st	139.625
Daniel Casper	Luc Violette	Ben Richardson	Chase Sinnett	(United States) Chaska CC, Chaska, Minnesota	–	(bronze) 5–4 (USA)	–	T2	DNP	DNP	Q	DNP	Tour Challenge Tier 2, US Open, St. Paul Cashspiel	22nd	135.750
Marco Hösli	Philipp Hösli (Note: Philipp Hösli threw last stones for the team at the Swiss Championship, while Marco Hösli skipped)	Simon Gloor	Justin Hausherr	CC Glarus, Glarus, Switzerland	–	4th 5–2 (SUI)	–	T2	DNP	DNP	DNP	DNP	Oslo Cup	23rd	134.750
Karsten Sturmay	Kyle Doering	Glenn Venance	Kurtis Goller	Kitscoty CC, Kitscoty, Alberta	(bronze) 5–3 (AB)	–	–	T2	DNP	DNP	DNP	DNP	Ed Werenich Golden Wrench Classic	24th	134.000
Marc Muskatewitz (Note: Muskatewitz did not play at the World Junior Championships as he is not junior-aged like the rest of the team. There, the team moved up one position with Mario Trevisol playing lead.)	Benjamin Kapp (Note: Kapp skipped the team and threw third stones earlier in the season)	Felix Messenzehl	Johannes Scheuerl	CC Füssen, Füssen, Germany	(silver) 2–3 (EQF)	(gold) (GER)	5th 8–5	DNP	DNP	DNP	DNP	DNP	Aberdeen Classic	25th	132.125
Yves Stocker	Kim Schwaller	Felix Eberhard	Tom Winkelhausen	CC Zug, Zug, Switzerland	–	5th 3–4 (SUI)	–	DNP	DNP	DNP	DNP	DNP	Tallinn Men's International Challenger	26th	126.000
Park Jong-duk	Jeong Yeong-seok	Oh Seung-hoon	Seong Ji-hoon	Gangwon Province, South Korea	(silver) 6–3 (PCCC)	(gold) 11–0 (KOR)	12th 2–10	DNP	DNP	DNP	DNP	DNP	–	27th	125.750
John Epping	Mathew Camm (Note: Aaron Squires replaced Camm at the Stu Sells Living Waters Collingwood Classic.)	Patrick Janssen	Jason Camm	Leaside CC, East York, Toronto, Ontario	(bronze) 4–3 (ON)	–	–	T2	DNP	DNP	DNP	DNP	Stu Sells Living Waters Collingwood Classic	28th	123.250
Wouter Gösgens	Laurens Hoekman	Jaap van Dorp	Alexander Magan (Note: Magan and van den Hurk rotate positions. Magan played in the World Championship); Tobias van den Hurk (Note: Magan and van den Hurk rotate positions. van den Hurk played in the European Championship, Tour Challenge and Sun City Cup)	CC PWA Zoetermeer, Zoetermeer, Netherlands	7th 3–6 (ECC)	–	8th 5–7	Q	DNP	DNP	DNP	DNP	Sun City Cup	29th	121.813
Sam Mooibroek	Scott Mitchell	Nathan Steele	Colin Schnurr	Whitby CC, Whitby, Ontario	5th 3–3 (ON)	–	–	T2	DNP	DNP	DNP	DNP	Comco Cash Spiel	30th	120.875
Riku Yanagisawa	Tsuyoshi Yamaguchi	Takeru Yamamoto	Satoshi Koizumi	SC Karuizawa Club, Karuizawa, Japan	(bronze) 7–2 (PCCC)	(silver) 6–3 (JPN)	–	Q	Q	DNP	DNP	DNP	–	31st	116.125
Glenn Howard (Note: Glenn Howard suffered a knee injury during the Nufloors Penticton Classic and did not play in any events thereafter. The team played with three players at the Ontario Tankard with Scott Howard skipping. The team added Mathew Camm as second for the Brier.)	Scott Howard	David Mathers; Mathew Camm (Note: Camm played second for the team at the Brier, with Mathers throwing third and Scott Howard skipping)	Tim March	Penetangishene CC, Penetanguishene, Ontario	(gold) 5–0 (ON)	12th 3–5 (Brier)	–	DNP	DNP	DNP	DNP	DNP	Nufloors Penticton Classic	32nd	115.751
Owen Purcell	Ryan Abraham	Scott Saccary	Adam McEachren	Halifax CC, Halifax, Nova Scotia	(silver) 4–3 (NS)	–	–	DNP	Q	DNP	DNP	DNP	Summer Series	33rd	101.813
Lukas Høstmælingen	Grunde Buraas (Note: Buraas did not play at the World Junior Championships. Eskil Eriksen played lead for the team at the World Juniors, with Nordbye playing third.)	Magnus Lillebø	Tinius Haslev Nordbye	Lillehammer CK, Lillehammer, Norway	–	4th 3–4 (NOR)	–	T2	DNP	DNP	DNP	DNP	World Junior Championships	34th	100.875
Ryan Wiebe	Ty Dilello	Sean Flatt	Adam Flatt	Fort Rouge CC, Winnipeg, Manitoba	T5th 4–2 (MB)	–	–	T2	DNP	DNP	DNP	DNP	Best of the West	35th	100.125
Catlin Schneider	Jason Ginter (Note: Middleton and Ginter switched positions part way through the season, with Middleton playing third to start the season)	Sterling Middleton	Alex Horvath	Victoria CC, Victoria, British Columbia	(gold) 6–1 (BC)	11th 4–4 (Brier)	–	T2	DNP	DNP	DNP	DNP	–	36th	100.000
Félix Asselin	Martin Crête	Émile Asselin	Jean-François Trépanier	Glenmore CC, Dollard-des-Ormeaux / CS Belvédère, Val-d'Or / CC Valleyfield, Salaberry-de-Valleyfield / CC Etchemin, Saint-Romuald, Quebec	(silver) 5–2 (QC)	–	–	DNP	DNP	DNP	DNP	DNP	Brantford Nissan Classic, Stu Sells 1824 Halifax Classic	37th	91.063
Pat Ferris	Landan Rooney	Connor Duhaime	Robert Currie	Grimsby CC, Grimsby, Ontario	4th 4–3 (ON)	–	–	DNP	DNP	DNP	DNP	DNP	Stroud Sleeman Cash Spiel	38th	86.000
Kelly Knapp	Brennen Jones	Mike Armstrong	Trent Knapp	Highland CC, Regina, Saskatchewan	6th 3–2 (SK)	–	–	DNP	DNP	DNP	DNP	DNP	Nutana SaskTour Men's Spiel, Scott Comfort Re/Max Blue Chip Bonspiel, SaskTour Mens Players Championship	39th	83.125
Jayden King	Dylan Niepage	Gavin Lydiate	Daniel Del Conte	London CC, London, Ontario	(silver) 7–3 (ON)	–	–	DNP	DNP	DNP	DNP	DNP	Capital Curling Fall Men's	40th	80.001
Tetsuro Shimizu	Shinya Abe (skip) (Note: Abe began the season throwing second rocks, with Ouchi throwing third. Abe was still the skip.)	Haruto Ouchi	Sota Tsuruga	Hokkaido Consadole Sapporo, Kitami, Japan	–	(gold) 8–0 (JPN)	11th 3–9	DNP	DNP	DNP	DNP	DNP	Advics Cup	41st	79.688
Takumi Maeda	Asei Nakahara	Hiroki Maeda	Uryu Kamikawa (Note: Kamikawa played for the team at the Japanese National Championship instead of Nakahara); Asei Nakahara	Loco Solare, Kitami, Japan	(gold) 9–0 (HKD)	(bronze) 6–3 (JPN)	–	DNP	DNP	DNP	DNP	DNP	Mother Club Fall Classic	42nd	78.063
Kohsuke Hirata	Shingo Usui	Rtoya Meguro	Yoshiya Miura	Kitami Assoc., Kitami, Japan	–	5th 3–4 (JPN)	–	DNP	DNP	DNP	DNP	DNP	Hokkaido Bank Classic, Mile Zero Cash Spiel, Alberta Curling Series: Event 1	43rd	77.375
Tanner Horgan	Jacob Horgan	Ian McMillan	Scott Chadwick	Northern Credit Union CC, Sudbury, Ontario	(silver) 3–1 (NO)	–	–	DNP	DNP	DNP	DNP	DNP	DeKalb Superspiel, Curl Mesabi Classic	44th	75.063
Go Aoki	Hayato Sato (skip)	Kouki Ogiwara	Yosuke Abe (Note: Abe played for the team at the Japanese National Championship instead of Niino); Kazushi Niino	Sapporo International University, Sapporo, Japan	–	7th 1–3 (JPN)	–	DNP	DNP	DNP	DNP	DNP	–	44th	75.063
Mark Kean	Brady Lumley	Matthew Garner	Spencer Dunlop	Oakville CC, Oakville, Ontario	6th 4–3 (ON)	–	–	DNP	DNP	DNP	DNP	DNP	Port Elgin Superspiel	46th	72.375
Jordon McDonald	Dallas Burgess	Elias Huminicki	Cameron Olafson	Assiniboine Memorial CC, Winnipeg, Manitoba	(bronze) 6–2 (MB)	–	–	DNP	DNP	DNP	DNP	DNP	MCT Shootout, MCT Showdown, Manitoba Junior Championships, Performance Kia Charity Open	47th	72.188
Michael Fournier	Kevin Flewwelling	Sean Harrison	Zander Elmes	Leaside CC, East York, Toronto, Ontario	7th 3–3 (ON)	–	–	DNP	DNP	DNP	DNP	DNP	–	48th	71.875
Braden Calvert	Corey Chambers	Kyle Kurz	Brendan Bilawka	Fort Rouge CC, Winnipeg, Manitoba	(silver) 6–1 (MB)	–	–	DNP	DNP	DNP	DNP	DNP	MCT Championships, Atkins Curling Supplies Classic	49th	70.875
Andrin Schnider (Note: Schnider and Hefti switched throwing positions at the Swiss national championships, with Schnider continuing to skip the team)	Dean Hürlimann	Marco Hefti	Nicola Stoll; Baptiste Défago (Note: Défago was the team's lead at the Swiss national championship, while Stoll was listed as the alternate)	CC Limmattal, Urdorf, Switzerland	–	(silver) 6–3 (SUI)	–	DNP	DNP	DNP	DNP	DNP	–	50th	67.625

== Women's ==
Team					Playdown record	National championship record	World championship record	Grand Slam record					Other event wins	World Curling team ranking	Points
Skip	Third	Second	Lead	Club/locale	Playdown record	National championship record	World championship record	TC	Nat'l	Mast.	CO	PC	Other event wins	World Curling team ranking	Points
Rachel Homan (Note: Homan had just given birth to her third child, and was replaced by Heather Nedohin at the Saville Shootout.)	Tracy Fleury	Emma Miskew	Sarah Wilkes	Ottawa CC, Ottawa, Ontario	–	(gold) 11–0 (STOH)	(gold) 13–1	Q	F	C	C	SF	Saville Shootout, Red Deer Curling Classic, PointsBet Invitational	1st	498.750
Alina Pätz	Silvana Tirinzoni (skip)	Selina Witschonke	Carole Howald	CC Aarau, Aarau, Switzerland	(gold) 11–0 (ECC)	(gold) 5–1 (SUI)	(silver) 11–3	QF	SF	F	F	C	Shorty Jenkins Classic, Stu Sells 1824 Halifax Classic, Women's Masters Basel	2nd	434.250
Gim Eun-ji	Kim Min-ji	Kim Su-ji; Seol Ye-ji (Note: Seol is the team's alternate. She played second at the International Bernese Ladies Cup.)	Seol Ye-eun	Uijeongbu CC, Uijeongbu, South Korea	(gold) 8–1 (PCCC)	(gold) 12–1 (KOR)	(bronze) 12–3	QF	C	QF	QF	SF	Autumn Gold Curling Classic, International Bernese Ladies Cup	3rd	362.000
Jennifer Jones	Karlee Burgess	Emily Zacharias	Lauren Lenentine	St. Vital CC, Winnipeg & Altona CC, Altona, Manitoba	–	(silver) 8–4 (STOH)	–	C	QF	SF	SF	Q	–	4th	316.125
Anna Hasselborg	Sara McManus	Agnes Knochenhauer	Sofia Mabergs	Sundbybergs CK, Sundbyberg, Sweden	(silver) 2–4 (EQF)	(gold) 7–1 (SWE)	5th 7–6	SF	SF	QF	QF	QF	Players Open, Oslo Cup	5th	298.000
Isabella Wranå	Almida de Val	Maria Larsson	Linda Stenlund	Sundbybergs CK, Sundbyberg, Sweden	(gold) 4–2 (EQF); 4th 6–5 (ECC)	(silver) 7–2 (SWE)	–	Q	QF	QF	Q	F	Sun City Cup	6th	271.750
Kim Eun-jung	Kim Kyeong-ae	Kim Cho-hi	Kim Seon-yeong	Gangneung CC, Gangneung, South Korea	–	(silver) 9–4 (KOR)	–	T2	DNP	Q	QF	QF	Western Showdown, Tour Challenge Tier 2, Stu Sells Tankard	7th	265.750
Kerri Einarson	Val Sweeting	Shannon Birchard	Briane Harris (Note: Harris was suspended from competition prior to the Scotties Tournament of Hearts for testing positive for Ligandrol. She was replaced at the Scotties and Players' Championship by Karwacki.); Krysten Karwacki	Gimli CC, Gimli, Manitoba	4th 4–5 (PCCC)	5th 7–3 (STOH)	–	SF	QF	SF	SF	Q	–	8th	251.250
Stefania Constantini	Elena Mathis	Angela Romei; Marta Lo Deserto (Note: Lo Deserto is the team's alternate. She played second at the National and the Masters, replacing Romei. She also replaced Romei at the North Grenville Women's Fall Classic.)	Giulia Zardini Lacedelli (Note: Zardini Lacedelli did not play in Italian Championship. She was replaced by Violetta Caldart for the first four matches, and the team played with three players in their remaining three games.)	CC Dolomiti, Cortina d'Ampezzo, Italy	(silver) 8–3 (ECC)	(silver) 5–2 (ITA)	4th 11–4	QF	QF	Q	DNP	Q	North Grenville Women's Fall Classic	9th	250.750
Kaitlyn Lawes	Selena Njegovan	Jocelyn Peterman	Kristin MacCuish	Fort Rouge CC, Winnipeg, Manitoba	(gold) 8–1 (MB)	6th 4–5 (STOH)	–	F	Q	Q	Q	Q	–	10th	207.375
Xenia Schwaller	Selina Gafner	Fabienne Rieder	Selina Rychiger	Grasshopper Club Zurich, Zurich, Switzerland	–	(silver) 3–2 (SUI)	–	DNP	DNP	DNP	DNP	Q	World Junior Championships, DeKalb Superspiel, Sundbyberg Open, Danish Open, Match Town Trophy	11th	203.875
Satsuki Fujisawa	Chinami Yoshida	Yumi Suzuki (Note: Suzuki missed two games at the Tour Challenge due to a back injury. The team played with three players in those games.)	Yurika Yoshida	Loco Solare, Kitami, Japan	(silver) 7–2 (PCCC)	4th 5–2 (JPN)	–	Q	Q	Q	QF	Q	Advics Cup	12th	190.813
Tabitha Peterson	Cory Thiesse	Tara Peterson	Becca Hamilton	(United States) St. Paul CC, Saint Paul, Minnesota	(bronze) 7–2 (PCCC)	(gold) 8–1 (USA)	7th 6–6	Q	Q	QF	Q	DNP	US Open	13th	186.875
Selena Sturmay	Danielle Schmiemann	Dezaray Hawes	Paige Papley	Saville Community SC, Edmonton, Alberta	(gold) 7–1 (AB)	4th 8–3 (STOH)	–	DNP	DNP	DNP	Q	DNP	Saville Grand Prix	14th	180.125
Rebecca Morrison	Jennifer Dodds (Note: Team Morrison had a five player team with all players except Morrison rotating their positions depending on the event. Dodds played third most often, Sinclair second and Jackson lead) (Note: Dodds did not play at the Canadian Open, as she was serving as an Athlete Role Model at the 2024 Winter Youth Olympics. She was replaced at lead with Fay Henderson.)	Gina Aitken; Sophie Sinclair	Sophie Jackson	Curl Aberdeen, Aberdeen, Scotland	4th 5–4 (ECC)	(silver) 9–4 (SCO)	8th 5–7	QF	DNP	Q	Q	DNP	–	15th	172.375
Kate Cameron (Note: Chelsea Carey replaced Cameron at the Canadian Open due to work commitments.)	Meghan Walter (Note: Walter fell ill for one game at the Scotties. The team played with three players for the match.)	Taylor McDonald; Kelsey Rocque (Note: Rocque replaced McDonald at the Scotties Tournament of Hearts as McDonald was eight months pregnant.)	Mackenzie Elias	Granite CC, Winnipeg, Manitoba	(bronze) 6–3 (MB)	(bronze) 7–4 (STOH)	–	Q	Q	Q	Q	DNP	Icebreaker Challenge	16th	167.000
Delaney Strouse	Anne O'Hara	Sydney Mullaney	Rebecca Rodgers	(United States) Traverse City CC, Traverse City, Michigan	–	(bronze) 6–3 (USA)	–	T2	Q	Q	Q	DNP	Mother Club Fall Classic, Euro Super Series	17th	164.875
Kristin Skaslien	Marianne Rørvik (skip)	Mille Haslev Nordbye	Martine Rønning	Lillehammer CK, Lillehammer, Norway	(bronze) 7–4 (ECC)	(silver) 6–1 (NOR)	9th 4–8	Q	DNP	DNP	DNP	DNP	–	18th	148.875
Ikue Kitazawa	Seina Nakajima	Ami Enami	Minori Suzuki; Hasumi Ishigooka (Note: Ishigooka was the team's alternate. She played lead for the team at the Tier 2 Tour Challenge, with Suzuki throwing second stones and Enami as the team's alternate)	Chubu Electric Power, Nagano, Japan	–	(bronze) 5–3 (JPN)	–	T2	DNP	DNP	DNP	DNP	Karuizawa International	19th	148.625
Danielle Inglis	Kira Brunton	Calissa Daly	Cassandra de Groot	Ottawa Hunt & GC, Ottawa, Ontario	(gold) 5–1 (ON)	14th 3–5 (STOH)	–	T2	DNP	DNP	DNP	DNP	Summer Series, Curling Stadium North Bay Women's Spiel	20th	145.438
Sayaka Yoshimura (Note: Regular skip Yoshimura missed most of the season due to pregnancy); Yuna Kotani	Kaho Onodera	Anna Ohmiya	Mina Kobayashi	Fortius, Sapporo, Japan	–	5th 4–3 (JPN)	–	T2	DNP	DNP	DNP	DNP	Hokkaido Bank Classic, Alberta Curling Series: Event 2, Wakkanai Midori Challenge Cup	21st	141.000
Corryn Brown	Erin Pincott	Jennifer Armstrong	Samantha Fisher	Kamloops CC, Kamloops, British Columbia	(silver) 7–3 (BC)	9th 4–4 (STOH)	–	DNP	DNP	DNP	DNP	DNP	Kamloops Crown of Curling	22nd	136.625
Ha Seung-youn	Kim Hye-rin	Yang Tae-i	Kim Su-jin	Chuncheon CC, Chuncheon, South Korea	–	(bronze) 7–4 (KOR)	–	Q	Q	DNP	DNP	DNP	Stu Sells Oakville Tankard	23rd	129.813
Serena Gray-Withers	Catherine Clifford	Brianna Cullen	Zoe Cinnamon	Saville Community SC, Edmonton, Alberta	(bronze) 5–3 (AB)	–	–	T2	DNP	DNP	DNP	DNP	U25 NextGen Classic, U Sports Championships, Canada West University Championship	24th	128.625
Kayla Skrlik	Brittany Tran	Geri-Lynn Ramsay	Ashton Skrlik	Garrison CC, Calgary, Alberta	(silver) 5–4 (AB)	–	–	T2	DNP	DNP	DNP	DNP	Alberta Tour-Kick off, Ladies Alberta Open, Alberta Curling Series: Event 3	25th	125.313
Madeleine Dupont	Mathilde Halse	Denise Dupont (Note: Denise Dupont played second at the World Championship, while Lander played second at the European Championship and the Tour Challenge); Jasmin Lander	My Larsen	Hvidovre CC, Hvidovre & Gentofte CC, Gentofte, Denmark	7th 3–6 (ECC)	(gold) (DEN)	6th 6–7	T2	DNP	DNP	DNP	DNP	–	26th	123.125
Jolene Campbell	Abby Ackland	Rachel Erickson	Sara Oliver	Assiniboine Memorial CC, Winnipeg, Manitoba	5th 5–3 (MB)	–	–	T2	DNP	DNP	Q	DNP	MCT Shootout	27th	122.938
Skylar Ackerman	Ashley Thevenot	Taylor Stremick	Kaylin Skinner	Nutana CC, Saskatoon, Saskatchewan	(gold) 6–1 (SK)	10th 4–4 (STOH)	–	DNP	DNP	DNP	DNP	DNP	Nutana SaskTour Women's Spiel, SaskTour Women's Players Championship, Moose Jaw SaskTour Spiel	28th	119.313
Miyu Ueno	Asuka Kanai	Junko Nishimuro	Yui Ueno	Karuizawa CC, Karuizawa, Japan	–	(gold) 7–2 (JPN)	11th 3–9	DNP	DNP	DNP	DNP	DNP	–	29th	117.125
Momoha Tabata	Miku Nihira (skip)	Sae Yamamoto (Note: Yamamoto replaced by Yuina Miura at the World Juniors)	Mikoto Nakajima	Hokkaido Bank, Sapporo, Japan	(gold) 9–0 (HKD)	(silver) 6–2 (JPN)	–	DNP	DNP	DNP	DNP	DNP	–	30th	114.000
Clancy Grandy	Kayla MacMillan	Lindsay Dubue	Sarah Loken (Note: Loken replaced by Rachelle Brown at the beginning of the season, including the Tour Challenge)	Vancouver CC, Vancouver, British Columbia	(gold) 9–0 (BC)	7th 5–3 (STOH)	–	Q	Q	Q	DNP	DNP	Perth Masters	31st	111.563
Christina Black	Jennifer Baxter	Karlee Everist	Shelley Barker	Halifax CC, Halifax, Nova Scotia	(silver) 4–2 (NS)	–	–	T2	Q	DNP	DNP	DNP	–	32nd	105.875
Beth Peterson	Kelsey Rocque (Note: Rocque replaced Loder at the Manitoba Scotties as Loder was on medical leave.); Jenna Loder	Katherine Doerksen	Melissa Gordon-Kurz	Assiniboine Memorial CC, Winnipeg, Manitoba	(silver) 7–3 (MB)	–	–	DNP	DNP	DNP	DNP	DNP	MCT Challenge, MCT Championships	33rd	102.625
Corrie Hürlimann	Briar Schwaller-Hürlimann (Note: Team Hürlimann rotated their front end. At the Swiss National championship, Schwaller-Hürlimann threw third, and Lörtscher threw lead. At the Tour Challenge, Schwizgebel threw third, and Müller threw second)	Celine Schwizgebel	Sarah Müller; Marina Lörtscher	CC Zug Zug, Switzerland	–	4th 1–3 (SUI)	–	T2	DNP	DNP	DNP	DNP	–	34th	100.876
Sarah Anderson	Taylor Anderson	Lexi Lanigan	Leah Yavarow	(United States) Minneapolis, Minnesota	–	(silver) 7–3 (USA)	–	T2	DNP	DNP	DNP	DNP	–	35th	99.375
Nancy Martin	Lindsey Bertsch	Madison Kleiter	Krysten Karwacki	Martensville CC, Martensville, Saskatchewan	(silver) 6–2 (SK)	–	–	T2	DNP	DNP	DNP	DNP	–	36th	97.063
Abby Marks	Elysa Crough	Kim Bonneau	Julianna Mackenzie	Crestwood CC, Edmonton, Alberta	DNQ (AB)	–	–	DNP	DNP	DNP	DNP	DNP	Best of the West, Saville U25 Challenge	37th	92.313
Michèle Jäggi	Chelsea Carey (Note: Carey played third for the team in several events, including the Tour Challenge); Irene Schori	Stefanie Berset	Lisa Muhmenthaler	CC Bern, Bern, Switzerland	–	5th 1–3 (SUI)	–	T2	DNP	DNP	DNP	DNP	–	38th	85.875
Jessie Hunkin	Jessie Haughian	Becca Hebert (Note: Robyn Silvernagle spared for Hebert at the Tour Challenge)	Dayna Demmans	Spruce Grove CC, Spruce Grove, Alberta	5th 4–3 (AB)	–	–	T2	DNP	DNP	DNP	DNP	–	39th	84.000
Han Yu	Wang Meini	Tian Linyuan	Yu Jiaxin	Beijing, China	(gold) 6–0 (PCCC-B)		–	DNP	DNP	DNP	DNP	DNP	Curling Stadium Alberta Curling Series Major	40th	78.750
Misaki Tanaka	Miori Nakamura (skip)	Haruka Kihara	Hiyori Ichinohe	Aomori CC, Aomori, Japan	(silver) 4–1 (Tōhoku)	–	–	DNP	DNP	DNP	DNP	DNP	New Year Curling in Miyota	41st	77.500
Moa Dryburgh	Thea Orefjord	Moa Tjärnlund	Moa Nilsson	Sundbybergs CK, Sundbyberg, Sweden	–	4th 5–2 (SWE)	–	DNP	DNP	DNP	DNP	DNP	Swedish Junior Championships	42nd	74.938
Jo-Ann Rizzo	Margot Flemming	Sarah Koltun	Kerry Galusha (skip)	Yellowknife CC, Yellowknife, Northwest Territories	(gold) 7–0 (NT)	12th 3–5 (STOH)	–	DNP	DNP	DNP	DNP	DNP	–	43rd	71.625
Laurie St-Georges	Jamie Sinclair (Note: Marie-France Larouche replaced Sinclair for two games at the Scotties)	Emily Riley	Kelly Middaugh	Glenmore CC, Dollard-des-Ormeaux & CC Laval-sur-le-Lac, Laval, Quebec	(gold) 6–0 (QC)	11th 4–4 (STOH)	–	DNP	DNP	DNP	DNP	DNP	Curl Mesabi Classic, Bogside Cup	44th	69.813
Krista McCarville	Andrea Kelly	Ashley Sippala (Note: Team McCarville had a five player team with Sippala, Lilly and Potts rotating their positions)	Kendra Lilly; Sarah Potts	Fort William CC, Thunder Bay, Ontario	(gold) 6–0 (NO)	8th 4–4 (STOH)	–	DNP	DNP	DNP	DNP	DNP	KW Fall Classic	45th	69.563
Kristy Watling	Laura Burtnyk	Emily Deschenes	Sarah Pyke	East St. Paul CC, East St. Paul, Manitoba	4th 5–3 (MB)	–	–	DNP	DNP	DNP	DNP	DNP	Scotties Berth Bonspiel	46th	64.688
Dilşat Yıldız	Öznur Polat	İfayet Şafak Çalıkuşu	Berfin Şengül	Milli Piyango CA, Erzurum, Turkey	8th 2–7 (ECC)		10th 3–9	DNP	DNP	DNP	DNP	DNP	Cortina Curling Cup	47th	63.625
Wang Rui	Guo Yanan	Dong Ziqi	Yang Ying	Beijing, China	–		–	DNP	DNP	DNP	DNP	DNP	Prestige Hotels & Resorts Classic, Alberta Curling Series: Event 1	48th	61.500
Stephanie Schmidt	Sara England	Ashley Williamson	Michelle Englot (skip)	Highland CC, Regina, Saskatchewan	(bronze) 5–3 (SK)	–	–	DNP	DNP	DNP	DNP	DNP	–	49th	60.625
Fay Henderson	Hailey Duff	Amy MacDonald	Katie McMillan	Dumfries Ice Bowl, Dumfries, Scotland	–	(gold) 11–1 (SCO)	–	DNP	DNP	DNP	DNP	DNP	Aberdeen Classic	50th	58.500

== Mixed doubles ==
Team			Playdown record	National championship record	World championship record	Event wins	World Curling team ranking	Points
Female	Male	Club/locale	Playdown record	National championship record	World championship record	Event wins	World Curling team ranking	Points
Marie Kaldvee	Harri Lill	Tallinn, Estonia	–	(gold) 8–0 (EST)	(silver) 8–4	Mixed Doubles Players' Championship, Super Series - Chilliwack	1st	206.000
Kristin Skaslien	Magnus Nedregotten	Lillehammer CK, Lillehammer, Norway	–	(gold) 6–0 (NOR)	(bronze) 8–3	Tallinn Mixed Doubles International, Mixed Doubles Łódź	2nd	188.750
Laura Walker	Kirk Muyres	Sherwood Park CC, Sherwood Park, Alberta	–	(silver) 9–1 (CAN)	–	Alberta Curling Series Mixed Doubles: Event 1	3rd	167.126
Tori Koana	Go Aoki	Yamanashi / Hokkaido, Japan	–	(bronze) 8–2 (JPN)	–	Super Series - Oakville, Super Series - Moose Jaw, Martensville Mixed Doubles, Palmerston Mixed Doubles Spiel, Latvian Mixed Doubles Cup 2	4th	140.250
Chiaki Matsumura	Yasumasa Tanida	Nagano / Hokkaido, Japan	–	5th 6–3 (JPN)	–	Super Series - Sherwood Park	5th	138.250
Kadriana Lott	Colton Lott (Note: Brayden Stewart played instead of Colton Lott at the Super Series Winnipeg event)	Winnipeg Beach CC, Winnipeg Beach, Manitoba	(gold) 7–1 (MB)	(gold) 10–0 (CAN)	5th 8–2	Super Series - Winnipeg	6th	124.875
Martine Rønning	Mathias Brænden	Lillehamer CK, Lillehamer, Norway	–	(silver) 5–1 (NOR)	–	Super Series - Halifax, British Curling Mixed Doubles Super Series	7th	126.876
Isabella Wranå	Rasmus Wranå	Sundbybergs CK, Sundbyberg & Karlstads CK, Karlstad, Sweden	(gold) (SWE-Q) 5–2	–	(gold) 10–1	–	8th	111.250
Nancy Martin	Steve Laycock	Martensville CC, Martensville, Saskatchewan	(silver) 4–1 (SK)	7th 6–3 (CAN)	–	Mixed Doubles Midweek Kick-Off	9th	99.376
Paige Papley	Evan van Amsterdam	Thistle CC, Edmonton, Alberta	(bronze) 4–1 (AB)	6th 5–3 (CAN)	–	Alberta Curling Series Mixed Doubles: Event 2	10th	98.6
Lisa Weagle (Note: Emily Deschenes played instead of Weagle at the Mixed Doubles Royal Montreal)	John Epping	Leaside CC, East York, Toronto, Ontario	–	10th 4–4 (CAN)	–	Mixed Doubles Royal Montreal, St. Thomas Mixed Doubles Classic	11th	97.282
Laurie St-Georges	Félix Asselin	Glenmore CC, Dollard-des-Ormeaux, Quebec	–	T13th 4–3 (CAN)	–	Boucherville Mixed Doubles	12th	97.126
Briar Schwaller-Hürlimann	Yannick Schwaller	CC Solothurn, Solothurn, Switzerland	–	(gold) 7–4 (SUI)	4th 7–5	–	13th	95.126
Jaelyn Cotter	Jim Cotter	Vernon CC, Vernon, British Columbia	(bronze) 5–2 (BC)	11th 4–4 (CAN)	–	–	14th	94.376
Cory Thiesse (Note: Cathy Overton-Clapham played instead of Thiesse at one event)	Korey Dropkin	Duluth, Minnesota, United States	–	(silver) 8–1 (USA)	–	Rocky Mountain Mixed Doubles Classic	15th	91.938
Tahli Gill	Dean Hewitt	Brisbane, Australia	–	(gold) 3–0 (AUS)	15th 4–6	–	16th	90.126
Jennifer Jones	Brent Laing	Barrie CC, Barrie, Ontario	–	T18th 3–4 (CAN)	–	–	17th	88.502
Jenny Perret	Martin Rios	CC Glarus, Glarus, Switzerland	–	3–4 5th (SUI)	–	Mixed Doubles Gstaad	18th	86.626
Kim Ji-yoon	Jeong Byeong-jin	Seoul, South Korea		(gold) 10–3 (KOR)	7th 5–4	–	19th	86.252
Taylor Reese-Hansen (Note: Hannah Durrant played instead of Reese-Hansen at one event)	Corey Chester	Victoria CC, Victoria, British Columbia	(gold) 6–2 (BC)	5th 6–2 (CAN)	–	Victoria Mixed Doubles Cash Spiel	20th	85.125
Anne-Sophie Gionest	Robert Desjardins	CC Chicoutimi, Chicoutimi & CC Riverbend, Alma, Quebec	(bronze) 5–2 (QC)	T18th 3–4 (CAN)	–	Victoria Mixed Doubles, Valleyfield Mixed Doubles	21st	84.502
Madison Kleiter	Rylan Kleiter	Nutana CC, Saskatoon, Saskatchewan	(bronze) 5–3 (SK)	4th 7–4 (CAN)	–	SaskTour Mixed Doubles Series	22nd	76.064
Han Yu	Zou Qiang	Beijing, China	–		–	Omnium Serviciers Financiers Richard April, Slovakia Mixed Doubles Cup II, Mixed Doubles Prague Trophy	23rd	74.876
Jessica Zheng	Victor Pietrangelo	Niagara Falls CC, Niagara Falls, Ontario	–	T13th 4–3 (CAN)	–	–	24th	73.378
Marlee Powers	Luke Saunders	Halifax CC, Halifax, Nova Scotia	(gold) 6–1 (NS)	T13th 4–3 (CAN)	–	–	25th	73.250
Therese Westman	Robin Ahlberg	Sundbybergs CK, Sundbyberg, Sweden	5th 1–3 (SWE-Q)	T7th 2–2 (SWE)	–	–	26th	71.876
Becca Hamilton	Matt Hamilton	McFarland, Wisconsin, United States	–	(gold) 9–2 (USA)	10th 5–4	–	27th	70.876
Émilia Gagné	Pierre-Luc Morissette	CC Jacques-Cartier, Sillery, Quebec City, Quebec	T8th 3–2 (QC)	T29th 1–6 (CAN)	–	Goldline Tour Finals	28th	70.250
Riley Sandham	Brendan Craig	Guelph CC, Guelph, Ontario	T10th 3–2 (ON)	12th 4–4 (CAN)	–	Ilderton Mixed Doubles Spiel, Arthur Mixed Doubles Spiel	29th	70.126
Yang Ying	Tian Jiafeng	Beijing, China	(bronze) 7–2 (WMDQ)		12th 3–6	Sherbrooke Mixed Doubles	30th	69.626
Lauren Wasylkiw (Note: Grace Holyoke played instead of Wasylkiw at one event)	Shane Konings	Unionville CC, Unionville, Markham, Ontario	(bronze) 5–2 (ON)	T13th 4–3 (CAN)	–	–	31st	69.0
Jocelyn Peterman	Brett Gallant	The Glencoe Club, Calgary, Alberta	–	(bronze) 8–3 (CAN)	–	–	32nd	68.750
Jennifer Armstrong (Note: Alyssa Kyllo played instead of Armstrong at the Penticton Mixed Doubles)	Tyrel Griffith	Thistle St. Andrews CC, Saint John, New Brunswick	–	T18th 3–4 (CAN)	–	St. Vital Mixed Doubles NISO Classic, Penticton Mixed Doubles	33rd	64.876
Sarah Anderson	Andrew Stopera	Minneapolis, Minnesota, United States	–	7th 5–3 (USA)	–	Madtown Doubledown, Colorado Curling Cup	34th	60.814
Melissa Adams	Alex Robichaud	Capital WC, Fredericton, New Brunswick	(gold) 7–1 (NB)	T25th 2–5 (CAN)	–	–	35th	60.376
Lauren Cheal	Greg Cheal (Note: Cedric Maurice played instead of Greg Cheal at one event)	Lennoxville CC, Lennoxville, Quebec	T14th 1–3 (QC)	T25th 2–5 (CAN)	–	–	36th	60.157
Jasmin Lander	Henrik Holtermann	Hvidovre, Denmark	–	(gold) 7–0 (DEN)	15th 4–5	–	37th	59.438
Kayla MacMillan (Note: MacMillan replaced by Gabby Brissette at provincial championship. Replaced by Serena Gray-Withers and Katelyn McGillivray at other events)	Sterling Middleton	Vancouver, British Columbia	(silver) 6–1 (BC)	–	–	Summer Series, U25 NextGen Classic	38th	57.250
Amanda Sluchinski (Note: Brittany Tran played instead of Amanda Sluchinski at one event)	Aaron Sluchinski	Airdrie CC, Airdrie, Alberta	(gold) 7–1 (AB)	8th 5–4 (CAN)	–	–	39th	56.938
Véronique Bouchard	Jean-François Charest	CC Chicoutmi, Chicoutimi, Quebec	T13th 1–3 (QC)	T18th 3–4 (CAN)	–	–	40th	55.876
Zuzana Paulová	Tomáš Paul	ASC Dukla, Prague, Czech Republic	(silver) 6–1 (CNMDQ-Nov); (silver) 7–1 (CNMDQ-Jan)	(gold) 8–3 (CZE)	16th 4–6	–	41st	55.250
Kelly Tremblay (Note: Sophie Sanscartier played instead of Tremblay at one event)	Pierre Lanoue	CC Nairn, Clermont & CC Boucherville, Boucherville, Quebec	(gold) 5–1 (QC)	T25th 2–5 (CAN)	–	–	42nd	54.064
Emira Abbes	Klaudius Harsch	Füssen, Germany	(bronze) 2–2 (GER-Q)	(bronze) 1–4 (GER)	–	Tallinn Masters Mixed Doubles	43rd	50.000
Alina Pätz	Sven Michel	CC Aarau, Aarau, Switzerland	–	(bronze) 6–2 (SUI)	–	–	44th	49.126
Chaelynn Kitz (Note: Kitz replaced by Kadriana Lott at Super Series - Winnipeg. Replaced by Nancy Martin at one other event.)	Brayden Stewart	Minnedosa CC, Minnedosa, Manitoba	–	T13th 4–3	–	Super Series - Winnipeg	45th	49.001
Rachel Homan; Andrea Kelly (Note: Kelly replaced Homan at the Canadian Mixed Doubles Championship while Homan was playing in the 2024 World Women's Curling Championship)	Tyler Tardi	Edmonton, Alberta	–	9th 5–3 (CAN)	–	–	46th	48.375
Adela Walczak	Andrzej Augustyniak	Łódź, Poland	5th 4–2 (WMDQ)	(gold) 6–0 (POL)	–	–	47th	48.000
Laura Engler	Kevin Wunderlin	CC Zug, Zug, Switzerland	(bronze) 4–3 (SMDQ)	6th 2–5 (SUI)	–	Mixed Doubles Prague Open	48th	47.250
Miyu Ueno	Tsuyoshi Yamaguchi	Nagano Prefecture, Japan	–	(gold) 5–1 (JPN)	9th 6–3	–	49th	47.3
Taylor Anderson	Ben Richardson	Chaska, Minnesota, United States	–	4th 5–4 (USA)	–	Southern Mixed Doubles	50th	45.126
