= 2026 Quebec Tankard =

Canadian provincial men's curling championship

- Host city: Rimouski, Quebec
- Arena: Complexe Sportif Desjardins
- Dates: January 5–11
- Winner: Team Asselin
- Curling club: Glenmore CC, Dollard-des-Ormeaux, Curling des Collines, Chelsea, CC Etchemin, Saint-Romuald; Club Sports Belvédère, Val-d'Or & CC Valleyfield, Salaberry-de-Valleyfield
- Skip: Jean-Michel Ménard
- Fourth: Félix Asselin
- Second: Martin Crête
- Lead: Jean-François Trépanier
- Finalist: Julien Tremblay

The 2026 Quebec Tankard (French: Championnat provincial Tankard 2026), the provincial men's curling championship of Quebec, was held from January 5 to 11 at the Complexe Sportif Desjardins in Rimouski, Quebec. The winning Jean-Michel Ménard rink represented Quebec at the 2026 Montana's Brier in St. John's, Newfoundland and Labrador. The event was held in conjunction with the 2026 Quebec Women's Curling Championship, the provincial women's curling championship.

The 2026 event returned to the format used in 2020 with two pools of eight playing a round robin. This qualified the top three teams for the championship pool and the top four teams for the playoffs.

== Qualification process ==
The teams qualified via the following methods:

Qualification method	Berths	Qualifying team(s)
2025 Quebec Tankard champion	1	Jean-Michel Ménard
Circuit Final winner	1	Yannick Martel
CTRS Leaders	3	Julien Tremblay; Pierre-Luc Morissette; Léandre Girard
Provincial Circuit Points	3	Mike Kennedy; Zackary Wise; Mathieu Gravel
Regional Qualification Tournaments	6	Guy Simard; Mathieu Tremblay; Maxime Elmaleh; Alexandre Leduc; Maxime Benoit; Peter Burgess
Last Chance Qualifier	2	Ryan Koroscil; Normand Bornais

== Teams ==
The teams are listed as follows:

Skip	Third	Second	Lead	Alternate	Coach	Club(s)
Mathieu Beaufort (Fourth)	Maxime Benoit (Skip)	Alexandre Comeau	Patrick Doyon			Aurèle-Racine
Normand Bornais	Samuel Bornais	Jean Philippe Côté	David Jutras	François Bornais		Jacques-Cartier/Trois-Rivières/Grand-Mère
Peter Burgess	Richard Cyr	Marc-André Marcil	Kevin Gravel	Pierre-Olivier Jean		Rimouski
Maxime Elmaleh	Sébastien Audet	Antoine Provencher	David Boivin	Steven Munroe		Victoria
Léandre Girard	Marc-Alexandre Dion	Jack Ragan	Xavier Guévin	Joël Amyotte		Victoria/Hudson Légion/Jacques-Cartier
Mathieu Gravel	Sonny Melancon	Alexandre Michaud	Mathieu Julieu Côté	Leo Letarte		Belvédère
Mike Kennedy	François Gionest	Robert Desjardins	René Dubois	Stewart Yaxley		Chicoutimi/Riverbend/Montreal Ouest
Ryan Koroscil	Kevin Garand	Tony Weingartshofer	Patrick Corbière			Ville Mont-Royal
Alexandre Leduc	François Hallé	Nicolas Dumaresq	Martin Trépanier			Valleyfield
Yannick Martel	Jean-François Charest	Émile Asselin	Bradley Lequin			Chicoutimi/Glenmore/Etchemin
Félix Asselin (Fourth)	Jean-Michel Ménard (Skip)	Martin Crête	Jean-François Trépanier			Des Collines/Glenmore/Belvédère/Etchemin/Valleyfield
Pierre-Luc Morissette	Mathis Arsenault	Pierre Lajoie	Pierre Lanoue	Maxime Bilodeau	Sophie Morissette	Jacques-Cartier/Grand-Mère/Boucherville
Guy Simard	Serge St-Germain	Philippe Simard	Jonathan Parrot			Amos
Julien Tremblay	Jesse Mullen	Jean-Michel Arsenault	Philippe Brassard		Éric Sylvain	Etchemin/Victoria/Chicoutimi/Kénogami
Mathieu Tremblay	Thierry Marcotte-Naud	Maxime Charbonneau	Thomas Corbeil	Simon Laroche		Laval-sur-le-Lac
Zackary Wise	Steven Lang	Kris Davis	Adam Cartwright	Jonathan Pinoul		Glenmore

=== Map of teams ===
Quebec Tankard Teams

== Round robin standings ==
Final Round Robin Standings

Key
Teams to Championship Pool

Pool A
Skip	W	L	W–L	PF	PA	EW	EL	BE	SE	LSD
Jean-Michel Ménard	7	0	–	53	23	29	21	2	7	137.4
Maxime Benoit	6	1	–	52	35	32	24	3	9	182.0
Mike Kennedy	5	2	–	55	36	30	27	1	7	259.1
Maxime Elmaleh	4	3	–	47	39	28	24	8	8	346.3
Pierre-Luc Morissette	3	4	–	39	45	26	26	2	8	384.2
Normand Bornais	2	5	–	35	44	22	28	5	7	318.7
Mathieu Gravel	1	6	–	33	60	22	31	4	4	304.4
Ryan Koroscil	0	7	–	29	61	22	30	1	6	389.3

Pool B
Skip	W	L	W–L	PF	PA	EW	EL	BE	SE	LSD
Julien Tremblay	7	0	–	58	32	29	24	5	6	144.6
Yannick Martel	6	1	–	60	24	29	20	1	9	162.7
Alexandre Leduc	4	3	1–0	47	33	33	19	4	15	259.8
Peter Burgess	4	3	0–1	43	50	24	24	4	4	509.5
Zackary Wise	2	5	1–1	41	59	21	33	1	5	259.8
Léandre Girard	2	5	1–1	38	57	25	29	3	8	393.2
Mathieu Tremblay	2	5	1–1	47	50	27	26	4	7	402.2
Guy Simard	1	6	–	27	56	20	33	3	4	357.0

== Round robin results ==
All draw times are listed in Eastern Time (UTC-05:00).

=== Draw 1 ===
Monday, January 5, 8:15 am

Sheet B	1	2	3	4	5	6	7	8	9	10	Final
Jean-Michel Ménard	0	2	0	0	0	2	1	0	2	X	7
Maxime Benoit 🔨	1	0	1	0	1	0	0	1	0	X	4

Sheet C	1	2	3	4	5	6	7	8	9	10	Final
Mathieu Gravel 🔨	0	0	0	1	0	1	0	0	X	X	2
Mike Kennedy	0	1	0	0	5	0	2	1	X	X	9

=== Draw 2 ===
Monday, January 5, 12:15 pm

Sheet A	1	2	3	4	5	6	7	8	9	10	Final
Zackary Wise	0	0	1	0	0	0	1	0	X	X	2
Julien Tremblay 🔨	2	1	0	0	0	2	0	2	X	X	7

Sheet B	1	2	3	4	5	6	7	8	9	10	Final
Pierre-Luc Morissette	1	0	0	0	1	0	0	0	1	1	4
Normand Bornais 🔨	0	0	0	1	0	1	1	0	0	0	3

Sheet C	1	2	3	4	5	6	7	8	9	10	Final
Ryan Koroscil	0	1	0	0	0	1	1	0	0	X	3
Maxime Elmaleh 🔨	0	0	0	2	3	0	0	0	1	X	6

Sheet D	1	2	3	4	5	6	7	8	9	10	Final
Mathieu Tremblay	0	0	0	1	0	0	1	0	X	X	2
Yannick Martel 🔨	2	1	2	0	2	0	0	1	X	X	8

Sheet E	1	2	3	4	5	6	7	8	9	10	Final
Peter Burgess	0	1	0	3	0	1	0	3	1	X	9
Léandre Girard 🔨	2	0	2	0	0	0	2	0	0	X	6

=== Draw 3 ===
Monday, January 5, 4:00 pm

Sheet B	1	2	3	4	5	6	7	8	9	10	Final
Alexandre Leduc 🔨	0	2	1	0	1	0	0	1	0	1	6
Guy Simard	0	0	0	1	0	2	0	0	0	0	3

Sheet E	1	2	3	4	5	6	7	8	9	10	Final
Mathieu Gravel	0	1	0	0	1	0	X	X	X	X	2
Jean-Michel Ménard 🔨	3	0	1	1	0	3	X	X	X	X	8

=== Draw 4 ===
Monday, January 5, 8:00 pm

Sheet A	1	2	3	4	5	6	7	8	9	10	Final
Normand Bornais 🔨	4	1	0	1	0	3	X	X	X	X	9
Ryan Koroscil	0	0	1	0	1	0	X	X	X	X	2

Sheet B	1	2	3	4	5	6	7	8	9	10	Final
Léandre Girard	0	0	2	2	0	3	0	2	1	X	10
Zackary Wise 🔨	1	2	0	0	3	0	2	0	0	X	8

Sheet C	1	2	3	4	5	6	7	8	9	10	Final
Maxime Benoit 🔨	1	0	2	0	2	0	1	3	X	X	9
Pierre-Luc Morissette	0	2	0	1	0	0	0	0	X	X	3

Sheet D	1	2	3	4	5	6	7	8	9	10	Final
Mike Kennedy 🔨	1	1	0	0	0	4	1	0	0	X	7
Maxime Elmaleh	0	0	0	1	1	0	0	1	0	X	3

Sheet E	1	2	3	4	5	6	7	8	9	10	Final
Julien Tremblay 🔨	0	3	0	2	0	4	0	2	0	X	11
Mathieu Tremblay	2	0	2	0	1	0	1	0	1	X	7

=== Draw 5 ===
Tuesday, January 6, 8:15 am

Sheet D	1	2	3	4	5	6	7	8	9	10	11	Final
Guy Simard	0	0	1	1	0	2	0	0	0	1	0	5
Peter Burgess 🔨	1	0	0	0	1	0	1	0	2	0	1	6

Sheet E	1	2	3	4	5	6	7	8	9	10	Final
Alexandre Leduc	0	0	2	0	1	1	0	1	0	X	5
Yannick Martel 🔨	0	1	0	2	0	0	2	0	4	X	9

=== Draw 6 ===
Tuesday, January 6, 12:15 pm

Sheet A	1	2	3	4	5	6	7	8	9	10	11	Final
Mike Kennedy	0	1	0	2	0	1	0	1	0	2	0	7
Maxime Benoit 🔨	1	0	2	0	1	0	2	0	1	0	1	8

Sheet B	1	2	3	4	5	6	7	8	9	10	11	Final
Ryan Koroscil 🔨	3	0	2	1	0	0	1	0	0	2	0	9
Mathieu Gravel	0	2	0	0	1	3	0	1	2	0	1	10

Sheet C	1	2	3	4	5	6	7	8	9	10	Final
Mathieu Tremblay	0	0	2	2	1	0	1	0	1	0	7
Zackary Wise 🔨	2	3	0	0	0	2	0	0	0	2	9

Sheet D	1	2	3	4	5	6	7	8	9	10	Final
Jean-Michel Ménard	0	5	1	0	1	0	2	X	X	X	9
Pierre-Luc Morissette 🔨	2	0	0	1	0	1	0	X	X	X	4

Sheet E	1	2	3	4	5	6	7	8	9	10	Final
Normand Bornais	1	0	0	3	0	0	1	0	0	X	5
Maxime Elmaleh 🔨	0	3	3	0	0	2	0	1	1	X	10

=== Draw 7 ===
Tuesday, January 6, 4:00 pm

Sheet A	1	2	3	4	5	6	7	8	9	10	Final
Peter Burgess	0	0	0	1	0	X	X	X	X	X	1
Alexandre Leduc 🔨	3	2	1	0	2	X	X	X	X	X	8

Sheet C	1	2	3	4	5	6	7	8	9	10	Final
Yannick Martel	0	2	1	2	2	1	X	X	X	X	8
Guy Simard 🔨	1	0	0	0	0	0	X	X	X	X	1

=== Draw 8 ===
Tuesday, January 6, 8:00 pm

Sheet A	1	2	3	4	5	6	7	8	9	10	Final
Maxime Elmaleh 🔨	1	0	1	3	0	3	0	2	X	X	10
Pierre-Luc Morissette	0	1	0	0	2	0	1	0	X	X	4

Sheet B	1	2	3	4	5	6	7	8	9	10	Final
Julien Tremblay 🔨	3	0	2	0	0	1	0	0	1	0	7
Léandre Girard	0	0	0	1	2	0	1	1	0	1	6

Sheet C	1	2	3	4	5	6	7	8	9	10	Final
Jean-Michel Ménard 🔨	2	0	2	2	2	X	X	X	X	X	8
Normand Bornais	0	1	0	0	0	X	X	X	X	X	1

Sheet D	1	2	3	4	5	6	7	8	9	10	Final
Mathieu Gravel	0	0	2	0	1	0	2	0	1	X	6
Maxime Benoit 🔨	4	1	0	0	0	1	0	3	0	X	9

Sheet E	1	2	3	4	5	6	7	8	9	10	Final
Ryan Koroscil	0	2	0	1	0	0	X	X	X	X	3
Mike Kennedy 🔨	3	0	1	0	3	2	X	X	X	X	9

=== Draw 9 ===
Wednesday, January 7, 8:15 am

Sheet A	1	2	3	4	5	6	7	8	9	10	Final
Léandre Girard	1	0	0	1	0	1	0	X	X	X	3
Yannick Martel 🔨	0	1	3	0	3	0	3	X	X	X	10

Sheet C	1	2	3	4	5	6	7	8	9	10	Final
Peter Burgess	0	0	2	0	1	0	X	X	X	X	3
Julien Tremblay 🔨	2	3	0	3	0	3	X	X	X	X	11

Sheet D	1	2	3	4	5	6	7	8	9	10	Final
Alexandre Leduc 🔨	1	2	0	1	0	0	3	1	0	X	8
Mathieu Tremblay	0	0	2	0	0	1	0	0	1	X	4

Sheet E	1	2	3	4	5	6	7	8	9	10	Final
Guy Simard	0	4	0	1	1	1	0	0	1	1	9
Zackary Wise 🔨	2	0	2	0	0	0	2	2	0	0	8

=== Draw 10 ===
Wednesday, January 7, 12:15 pm

Sheet A	1	2	3	4	5	6	7	8	9	10	Final
Ryan Koroscil	0	1	0	1	0	0	1	0	X	X	3
Jean-Michel Ménard 🔨	3	0	1	0	2	0	0	2	X	X	8

Sheet C	1	2	3	4	5	6	7	8	9	10	Final
Maxime Elmaleh 🔨	0	1	0	2	0	0	0	0	0	1	4
Maxime Benoit	0	0	1	0	0	0	2	2	0	0	5

Sheet D	1	2	3	4	5	6	7	8	9	10	Final
Normand Bornais 🔨	0	4	0	0	1	0	0	1	0	0	6
Mike Kennedy	0	0	2	0	0	2	2	0	2	1	9

Sheet E	1	2	3	4	5	6	7	8	9	10	Final
Pierre-Luc Morissette	0	2	2	1	0	2	X	X	X	X	7
Mathieu Gravel 🔨	1	0	0	0	0	0	X	X	X	X	1

=== Draw 11 ===
Wednesday, January 7, 4:00 pm

Sheet A	1	2	3	4	5	6	7	8	9	10	Final
Mathieu Tremblay 🔨	0	2	1	1	0	4	1	X	X	X	9
Guy Simard	0	0	0	0	1	0	0	X	X	X	1

Sheet C	1	2	3	4	5	6	7	8	9	10	Final
Alexandre Leduc 🔨	2	1	0	1	2	1	2	X	X	X	9
Léandre Girard	0	0	0	0	0	0	0	X	X	X	0

Sheet D	1	2	3	4	5	6	7	8	9	10	Final
Peter Burgess 🔨	0	0	2	4	3	1	X	X	X	X	10
Zackary Wise	2	0	0	0	0	0	X	X	X	X	2

Sheet E	1	2	3	4	5	6	7	8	9	10	Final
Yannick Martel	0	0	1	0	0	1	0	3	0	0	5
Julien Tremblay 🔨	0	1	0	1	1	0	1	0	0	2	6

=== Draw 12 ===
Thursday, January 8, 8:15 am

Sheet A	1	2	3	4	5	6	7	8	9	10	Final
Mathieu Gravel 🔨	2	0	1	0	0	3	0	0	0	2	8
Maxime Elmaleh	0	1	0	1	5	0	1	2	0	0	10

Sheet B	1	2	3	4	5	6	7	8	9	10	Final
Mike Kennedy 🔨	0	0	2	1	0	0	1	0	1	0	5
Jean-Michel Ménard	1	1	0	0	0	1	0	2	0	1	6

Sheet D	1	2	3	4	5	6	7	8	9	10	Final
Pierre-Luc Morissette 🔨	1	1	0	5	0	0	0	2	X	X	9
Ryan Koroscil	0	0	1	0	1	1	1	0	X	X	4

Sheet E	1	2	3	4	5	6	7	8	9	10	Final
Maxime Benoit 🔨	2	1	0	1	2	0	0	0	1	X	7
Normand Bornais	0	0	1	0	0	0	1	1	0	X	3

=== Draw 13 ===
Thursday, January 8, 12:15 pm

Sheet B	1	2	3	4	5	6	7	8	9	10	Final
Mathieu Tremblay 🔨	2	0	0	1	0	3	0	0	2	0	8
Peter Burgess	0	3	0	0	3	0	0	2	0	1	9

Sheet C	1	2	3	4	5	6	7	8	9	10	Final
Zackary Wise	0	0	1	0	1	0	X	X	X	X	2
Yannick Martel 🔨	3	1	0	2	0	4	X	X	X	X	10

Sheet D	1	2	3	4	5	6	7	8	9	10	Final
Julien Tremblay 🔨	1	2	0	0	1	0	1	1	0	0	6
Alexandre Leduc	0	0	0	1	0	2	0	0	1	1	5

Sheet E	1	2	3	4	5	6	7	8	9	10	Final
Léandre Girard	0	1	1	1	1	0	1	0	4	X	9
Guy Simard 🔨	2	0	0	0	0	1	0	1	0	X	4

=== Draw 14 ===
Thursday, January 8, 4:00 pm

Sheet A	1	2	3	4	5	6	7	8	9	10	Final
Pierre-Luc Morissette 🔨	3	0	1	0	1	0	1	1	0	1	8
Mike Kennedy	0	4	0	1	0	2	0	0	2	0	9

Sheet B	1	2	3	4	5	6	7	8	9	10	Final
Maxime Benoit 🔨	0	3	0	3	0	1	2	1	X	X	10
Ryan Koroscil	1	0	2	0	2	0	0	0	X	X	5

Sheet C	1	2	3	4	5	6	7	8	9	10	Final
Normand Bornais	0	0	1	0	1	1	1	4	X	X	8
Mathieu Gravel 🔨	2	1	0	1	0	0	0	0	X	X	4

Sheet D	1	2	3	4	5	6	7	8	9	10	Final
Maxime Elmaleh	0	0	1	1	0	1	0	1	0	X	4
Jean-Michel Ménard 🔨	1	0	0	0	3	0	2	0	1	X	7

=== Draw 15 ===
Thursday, January 8, 8:00 pm

Sheet A	1	2	3	4	5	6	7	8	9	10	Final
Yannick Martel	0	3	0	2	0	0	1	0	4	X	10
Peter Burgess 🔨	3	0	1	0	0	0	0	1	0	X	5

Sheet B	1	2	3	4	5	6	7	8	9	10	Final
Guy Simard 🔨	1	0	2	0	0	1	0	X	X	X	4
Julien Tremblay	0	2	0	0	5	0	3	X	X	X	10

Sheet C	1	2	3	4	5	6	7	8	9	10	Final
Léandre Girard 🔨	1	0	2	0	1	0	X	X	X	X	4
Mathieu Tremblay	0	4	0	2	0	4	X	X	X	X	10

Sheet E	1	2	3	4	5	6	7	8	9	10	Final
Zackary Wise	0	0	1	0	2	0	2	0	0	5	10
Alexandre Leduc 🔨	2	1	0	0	0	1	0	1	1	0	6

== Championship pool standings ==
Final Championship Pool Standings

Key
Teams to Playoffs

Skip	W	L	W–L
Jean-Michel Ménard	10	0	–
Julien Tremblay	9	1	–
Yannick Martel	7	3	1–0
Maxime Benoit	7	3	0–1
Mike Kennedy	6	4	–
Alexandre Leduc	5	5	–

== Championship pool results ==
=== Draw 16 ===
Friday, January 9, 12:30 pm

Sheet A	1	2	3	4	5	6	7	8	9	10	Final
Alexandre Leduc 🔨	1	0	2	0	1	0	2	0	0	0	6
Maxime Benoit	0	1	0	1	0	1	0	2	1	1	7

Sheet B	1	2	3	4	5	6	7	8	9	10	Final
Jean-Michel Ménard 🔨	0	4	0	5	0	1	X	X	X	X	10
Yannick Martel	1	0	2	0	2	0	X	X	X	X	5

Sheet E	1	2	3	4	5	6	7	8	9	10	Final
Mike Kennedy	0	0	1	0	0	2	0	X	X	X	3
Julien Tremblay 🔨	0	1	0	3	3	0	3	X	X	X	10

=== Draw 17 ===
Friday, January 9, 7:00 pm

Sheet C	1	2	3	4	5	6	7	8	9	10	Final
Julien Tremblay	0	1	0	2	0	1	0	0	X	X	4
Jean-Michel Ménard 🔨	2	0	1	0	2	0	3	2	X	X	10

Sheet D	1	2	3	4	5	6	7	8	9	10	Final
Mike Kennedy 🔨	0	2	0	2	0	0	1	1	0	0	6
Alexandre Leduc	1	0	2	0	1	1	0	0	1	1	7

Sheet E	1	2	3	4	5	6	7	8	9	10	Final
Yannick Martel 🔨	1	0	2	0	0	1	0	1	0	1	6
Maxime Benoit	0	1	0	0	2	0	1	0	1	0	5

=== Draw 18 ===
Saturday, January 10, 9:30 am

Sheet A	1	2	3	4	5	6	7	8	9	10	Final
Yannick Martel	0	2	2	0	1	0	1	0	1	0	7
Mike Kennedy 🔨	2	0	0	1	0	2	0	3	0	2	10

Sheet B	1	2	3	4	5	6	7	8	9	10	Final
Maxime Benoit 🔨	0	0	1	0	1	0	X	X	X	X	2
Julien Tremblay	1	1	0	2	0	4	X	X	X	X	8

Sheet E	1	2	3	4	5	6	7	8	9	10	Final
Alexandre Leduc	0	1	0	2	0	2	1	0	1	0	7
Jean-Michel Ménard 🔨	2	0	2	0	3	0	0	1	0	3	11

== Playoffs ==
Page playoff system
1	Jean-Michel Ménard	8
2	Julien Tremblay	6
3	Yannick Martel	9
4	Maxime Benoit	1

Semifinal
2	Julien Tremblay	10
3	Yannick Martel	4

Final
1	Jean-Michel Ménard	9
2	Julien Tremblay	4

=== 1 vs. 2 ===
Saturday, January 10, 5:00 pm

Sheet B	1	2	3	4	5	6	7	8	9	10	Final
Jean-Michel Ménard 🔨	0	2	0	0	2	0	1	0	2	1	8
Julien Tremblay	0	0	2	1	0	1	0	2	0	0	6

=== 3 vs. 4 ===
Saturday, January 10, 5:00 pm

Sheet D	1	2	3	4	5	6	7	8	9	10	Final
Yannick Martel 🔨	2	2	1	1	0	0	3	X	X	X	9
Maxime Benoit	0	0	0	0	1	0	0	X	X	X	1

=== Semifinal ===
Sunday, January 11, 9:00 am

Sheet B	1	2	3	4	5	6	7	8	9	10	Final
Julien Tremblay 🔨	4	1	0	2	1	0	2	X	X	X	10
Yannick Martel	0	0	2	0	0	2	0	X	X	X	4

=== Final ===
Sunday, January 11, 2:00 pm

Sheet B	1	2	3	4	5	6	7	8	9	10	Final
Jean-Michel Ménard 🔨	0	1	0	0	2	0	2	1	3	X	9
Julien Tremblay	0	0	0	2	0	2	0	0	0	X	4

2026 Quebec Tankard

Jean-Michel Ménard
13th Quebec Provincial Championship title
