= 2025 Quebec Women's Curling Championship =

Canadian provincial women's curling championship

- Host city: Alma, Quebec
- Arena: Centre Sportif Mistouk
- Dates: January 15–19
- Winner: Team St-Georges
- Curling club: Glenmore CC, Dollard-des-Ormeaux & CC Laval-sur-le-Lac, Laval
- Skip: Laurie St-Georges
- Third: Jamie Sinclair
- Second: Emily Riley
- Lead: Lisa Weagle
- Finalist: Émilia Gagné

The 2025 Quebec Women's Curling Championship (French: Championnat provincial féminin 2025), the provincial women's curling championship of Quebec, was held from January 15 to 19 at the Centre Sportif Mistouk in Alma, Quebec. The winning Laurie St-Georges rink represented Quebec at the 2025 Scotties Tournament of Hearts in Thunder Bay, Ontario. The event was held in conjunction with the 2025 Quebec Tankard, the provincial men's curling championship.

== Teams ==
The teams are listed as follows:

Skip	Third	Second	Lead	Alternate	Coach	Club(s)
Kelsey Boyd	Alison Davies	Erica Cull	Marie-Claude Comeau	Christine Paradis		Glenmore/Ville Mont-Royal/Valleyfield
Jolianne Fortin	Emy Lafrance	Megan Lafrance	Mégane Fortin		Brandon Lafrance	Kénogami
Émilia Gagné	Brenda Nicholls	Kelly Tremblay	Pamela Nugent	Hannah Gargul	Neil Gargul	Glenmore/Jacques-Cartier/Victoria/Clermont
Anne-Sophie Gionest	Sarah Bergeron	Sarah-Ann Daigle	Juliette Bergeron		Nathalie Gagnon	Riverbend
Dominique Jean	Sophie Legler	Meaghan Rivett	Dominique Ricard	Delphine Beauchemin	Julie Hamel	Montréal Ouest/Lennoxville/Portneuf
Laurie St-Georges	Jamie Sinclair	Emily Riley	Lisa Weagle			Glenmore/Laval-sur-le-Lac

=== Map of teams ===
Quebec Women's Curling Championship Teams

== Round robin standings ==
Final Round Robin Standings

Key
Teams to Playoffs

Skip	W	L	PF	PA	EW	EL	BE	SE
Laurie St-Georges	5	0	44	23	23	16	1	8
Jolianne Fortin	4	1	44	30	23	19	2	8
Émilia Gagné	3	2	42	34	21	23	3	6
Anne-Sophie Gionest	2	3	35	32	20	21	1	6
Dominique Jean	1	4	34	49	18	24	0	5
Kelsey Boyd	0	5	26	57	19	21	3	5

== Round robin results ==
All draw times are listed in Eastern Time (UTC-05:00).

=== Draw 1 ===
Wednesday, January 15, 11:00 am

Sheet C	1	2	3	4	5	6	7	8	9	10	Final
Laurie St-Georges	4	0	4	0	2	X	X	X	X	X	10
Kelsey Boyd	0	1	0	1	0	X	X	X	X	X	2

Sheet E	1	2	3	4	5	6	7	8	9	10	Final
Émilia Gagné	1	0	0	4	0	0	0	2	2	X	9
Dominique Jean	0	1	0	0	1	0	2	0	0	X	4

=== Draw 2 ===
Wednesday, January 15, 8:15 pm

Sheet A	1	2	3	4	5	6	7	8	9	10	Final
Jolianne Fortin	1	1	2	0	0	0	1	0	0	1	6
Anne-Sophie Gionest	0	0	0	1	1	0	0	2	1	0	5

=== Draw 3 ===
Thursday, January 16, 9:00 am

Sheet B	1	2	3	4	5	6	7	8	9	10	Final
Laurie St-Georges	0	0	2	2	0	2	3	1	X	X	10
Jolianne Fortin	0	1	0	0	2	0	0	0	X	X	3

Sheet C	1	2	3	4	5	6	7	8	9	10	Final
Émilia Gagné	0	3	0	2	1	0	2	1	X	X	9
Anne-Sophie Gionest	1	0	1	0	0	2	0	0	X	X	4

Sheet D	1	2	3	4	5	6	7	8	9	10	Final
Kelsey Boyd	0	1	1	0	3	1	0	1	0	X	7
Dominique Jean	1	0	0	3	0	0	6	0	3	X	13

=== Draw 4 ===
Thursday, January 16, 4:30 pm

Sheet B	1	2	3	4	5	6	7	8	9	10	Final
Émilia Gagné	0	0	0	4	0	4	0	2	0	2	12
Kelsey Boyd	1	1	3	0	1	0	1	0	1	0	8

Sheet C	1	2	3	4	5	6	7	8	9	10	Final
Jolianne Fortin	2	0	3	0	3	0	2	3	X	X	13
Dominique Jean	0	2	0	1	0	1	0	0	X	X	4

Sheet D	1	2	3	4	5	6	7	8	9	10	Final
Laurie St-Georges	4	0	0	0	1	0	1	0	0	1	7
Anne-Sophie Gionest	0	2	1	1	0	0	0	1	0	0	5

=== Draw 5 ===
Friday, January 17, 12:45 pm

Sheet A	1	2	3	4	5	6	7	8	9	10	Final
Anne-Sophie Gionest	3	1	0	0	3	0	3	X	X	X	10
Kelsey Boyd	0	0	1	1	0	1	0	X	X	X	3

Sheet D	1	2	3	4	5	6	7	8	9	10	Final
Émilia Gagné	1	2	0	1	0	0	0	1	0	0	5
Jolianne Fortin	0	0	2	0	1	0	1	0	2	4	10

Sheet E	1	2	3	4	5	6	7	8	9	10	Final
Laurie St-Georges	2	3	0	1	1	0	0	0	2	X	9
Dominique Jean	0	0	1	0	0	1	2	2	0	X	6

=== Draw 6 ===
Friday, January 17, 8:15 pm

Sheet A	1	2	3	4	5	6	7	8	9	10	Final
Laurie St-Georges	1	1	0	1	0	0	3	1	0	1	8
Émilia Gagné	0	0	2	0	2	2	0	0	1	0	7

Sheet B	1	2	3	4	5	6	7	8	9	10	Final
Anne-Sophie Gionest	1	1	0	3	0	3	0	0	3	X	11
Dominique Jean	0	0	2	0	2	0	1	2	0	X	7

Sheet E	1	2	3	4	5	6	7	8	9	10	Final
Jolianne Fortin	1	0	1	0	0	5	0	1	1	3	12
Kelsey Boyd	0	1	0	3	2	0	0	0	0	0	6

== Playoffs ==
Semifinal			Final
			1	Laurie St-Georges	9
2	Jolianne Fortin	7	3	Émilia Gagné	2
3	Émilia Gagné	9

=== Semifinal ===
Saturday, January 18, 7:30 pm

Sheet C	1	2	3	4	5	6	7	8	9	10	Final
Jolianne Fortin	2	0	2	0	1	0	1	0	1	X	7
Émilia Gagné	0	2	0	2	0	2	0	3	0	X	9

=== Final ===
Sunday, January 19, 12:00 pm

Sheet C	1	2	3	4	5	6	7	8	9	10	Final
Laurie St-Georges	2	0	1	0	2	0	2	1	1	X	9
Émilia Gagné	0	0	0	1	0	1	0	0	0	X	2

2025 Quebec Women's Curling Championship

Laurie St-Georges
3rd Quebec Provincial Championship title
