= 2025 Quebec Tankard =

Canadian provincial men's curling championship

2025 Hardline Quebec Tankard
- Host city: Alma, Quebec
- Arena: Centre Sportif Mistouk
- Dates: January 14–19
- Winner: Team Asselin
- Curling club: Glenmore CC, Dollard-des-Ormeaux, Curling des Collines, Chelsea, CC Etchemin, Saint-Romuald & CC Valleyfield, Salaberry-de-Valleyfield
- Skip: Jean-Michel Ménard
- Fourth: Félix Asselin
- Second: Martin Crête
- Lead: Jean-François Trépanier
- Finalist: Robert Desjardins

The 2025 Hardline Quebec Tankard (French: Tankard Hardline 2025), the provincial men's curling championship of Quebec, was held from January 14 to 19 at the Centre Sportif Mistouk in Alma, Quebec. The winning Team Asselin will represent Quebec at the 2025 Montana's Brier in Kelowna, British Columbia. The event was held in conjunction with the 2025 Quebec Women's Curling Championship, the provincial women's championship.

== Qualification process ==
The teams qualified via the following methods:

Qualification method	Berths	Qualifying team(s)
2024 Quebec Tankard champion	1	Julien Tremblay
Circuit Final winner	1	Pierre-Luc Morissette
CTRS Leaders	3	Félix Asselin; Robert Desjardins; Kinley Burton
Provincial Circuit Points	3	Pascal Girard; Normand Bornais; Zackary Wise
Regional Qualification Tournaments	6	Jean-Sébastien Roy; Pascal Gagnon; William Tremblay; Raphaël Patry; François Roberge; Zachary Janidlo
Last Chance Qualifier	2	David Maheux; Alexandre Leduc

== Teams ==
The teams are listed as follows:

Skip	Third	Second	Lead	Alternate	Coach	Club(s)
Félix Asselin (Fourth)	Jean-Michel Ménard (Skip)	Martin Crête	Jean-François Trépanier			Glenmore / Des Collines / Etchemin / Valleyfield
Normand Bornais	Patrick Martin	Samuel Bornais	David Jutras	François Bornais	Marie-Josée Billo	Jacques-Cartier / Trois-Rivières / Grand-Mère
Kinley Burton	Jack Ragan	Léandre Girard	Xavier Guévin	Joël Amyotte	Robert Richard	Victoria / Hudson Legion
Robert Desjardins	François Gionest	Yannick Martel	Bradley Lequin	Jean-François Charest		Chicoutimi / Riverbend / Etchemin
Pascal Gagnon	Jonathan Martel	Philippe Desjardins	Patrick Charron			Noranda
Pascal Girard	Steeve Otis	Mario Gagnon	Mathieu Hamel		Noémie Verreault	Chicoutimi / Kénogami
Zachary Janidlo	Owen Paterson	Nicolas Janidlo	Coby Olszewski	Cole Richard	Stephen Janidlo	Pointe-Claire
Alexandre Leduc	François Hallé	Nicolas Dumaresq	Martin Trépanier			Valleyfield
David Maheux	Kevin Bleau	Raphael Charbonneau	Michael Charbonneau			St-Bruno
Pierre-Luc Morissette	Pierre Lajoie	Marc-Alexandre Dion	Pierre Lanoue	Maxime Bilodeau	Sophie Morissette	Jacques-Cartier / Boucherville
Raphaël Patry	Anthony Pedneault	Jacob Labrecque	Frederic Patry			Kénogami
François Roberge	Mathieu Beaufort	Maxime Benoit	Patrick Doyon			Aurèle-Racine
Jean-Sébastien Roy	Steven Munroe	Pierre-Olivier Roy	Louis-François Brassard	Jacob Lepage		Des Collines
Julien Tremblay	Jean-Michel Arsenault	Jesse Mullen	Philippe Brassard		Éric Sylvain	Etchemin / Victoria / Chicoutimi
William Tremblay	Hugo Dallaire-Bouchard	Cedrick Bilodeau	Mathieu Chouinard			Nairn
Zackary Wise	Michael Solomon	Kristofer Davis	Adam Cartwright			Glenmore

=== Map of teams ===
Quebec Tankard Teams

== Knockout brackets ==
=== A event ===
First Knockout	Qualifier 1
Team Asselin	11
Zachary Janidlo	4
Team Asselin	7
Zackary Wise	4
Pascal Girard	7
Zackary Wise	8
Team Asselin	6
Raphaël Patry	1
Jean-Sébastien Roy	7
David Maheux	6
Jean-Sébastien Roy	5
Raphaël Patry	10
Pierre-Luc Morissette	2
Raphaël Patry	9
Team Asselin	8
Julien Tremblay	9
Robert Desjardins	8
William Tremblay	4
Robert Desjardins	7
Normand Bornais	4
François Roberge	8
Normand Bornais	9
Robert Desjardins	3
Julien Tremblay	7
Alexandre Leduc	7
Kinley Burton	5
Alexandre Leduc	4
Julien Tremblay	10
Julien Tremblay	10
Pascal Gagnon	1

=== B event ===
Second Knockout	Qualifier 2
Alexandre Leduc	8
Raphaël Patry	3
Zachary Janidlo	2	Pascal Girard	4
Alexandre Leduc	7	Pierre-Luc Morissette	7
Pascal Girard	8
Pierre-Luc Morissette	8
Normand Bornais	4
David Maheux	1	Pierre-Luc Morissette	10
Pierre-Luc Morissette	12
Team Asselin	7
Pierre-Luc Morissette	2	Robert Desjardins	4
Robert Desjardins	9
Jean-Sébastien Roy	4
Robert Desjardins	8
William Tremblay	6	François Roberge	7
François Roberge	7	François Roberge	6
François Roberge	10
Zackary Wise	3
Zackary Wise	6
Kinley Burton	2	Pascal Gagnon	3
Pascal Gagnon	9

=== C event ===
Third knockout	Qualifier 3
Raphaël Patry	9
William Tremblay	6	Pascal Girard	11	Robert Desjardins	6
Pascal Girard	8	Pascal Girard	9	Pascal Girard	5
Jean-Sébastien Roy	8
Zackary Wise	4
Zachary Janidlo	5	Jean-Sébastien Roy	8
Jean-Sébastien Roy	8

Third knockout	Qualifier 4
François Roberge	10
David Maheux	6	David Maheux	8	Pierre-Luc Morissette	5
Pascal Gagnon	5	François Roberge	8	François Roberge	7
Alexandre Leduc	3
Alexandre Leduc	8
Kinley Burton	9	Kinley Burton	5
Normand Bornais	6

== Knockout results ==
All draw times are listed in Eastern Time (UTC-05:00).

=== Draw 1 ===
Tuesday, January 14, 12:30 pm

Sheet A	1	2	3	4	5	6	7	8	9	10	Final
Team Asselin	0	2	3	0	0	1	1	0	4	X	11
Zachary Janidlo 🔨	1	0	0	2	1	0	0	0	0	X	4

Sheet B	1	2	3	4	5	6	7	8	9	10	11	Final
Jean-Sébastien Roy 🔨	2	0	0	0	1	0	0	2	0	1	1	7
David Maheux	0	0	0	0	0	2	1	0	3	0	0	6

Sheet D	1	2	3	4	5	6	7	8	9	10	Final
Alexandre Leduc	0	0	0	1	1	3	1	0	0	1	7
Kinley Burton 🔨	0	2	0	0	0	0	0	2	1	0	5

Sheet E	1	2	3	4	5	6	7	8	9	10	Final
Robert Desjardins 🔨	0	1	0	2	0	0	2	0	3	X	8
William Tremblay	0	0	1	0	0	1	0	2	0	X	4

=== Draw 2 ===
Tuesday, January 14, 4:30 pm

Sheet A	1	2	3	4	5	6	7	8	9	10	Final
Pascal Girard	0	0	0	3	0	0	1	0	3	0	7
Zackary Wise 🔨	0	1	1	0	2	1	0	1	0	2	8

Sheet B	1	2	3	4	5	6	7	8	9	10	Final
Pierre-Luc Morissette	0	0	0	1	0	1	0	X	X	X	2
Raphaël Patry 🔨	0	2	1	0	3	0	3	X	X	X	9

Sheet D	1	2	3	4	5	6	7	8	9	10	Final
Julien Tremblay 🔨	1	1	0	2	4	2	X	X	X	X	10
Pascal Gagnon	0	0	1	0	0	0	X	X	X	X	1

Sheet E	1	2	3	4	5	6	7	8	9	10	11	Final
François Roberge	0	2	0	4	1	0	1	0	0	0	0	8
Normand Bornais 🔨	1	0	2	0	0	2	0	2	0	1	1	9

=== Draw 3 ===
Wednesday, January 15, 11:00 am

Sheet A	1	2	3	4	5	6	7	8	9	10	Final
David Maheux 🔨	0	1	0	0	0	X	X	X	X	X	1
Pierre-Luc Morissette	2	0	6	1	3	X	X	X	X	X	12

Sheet B	1	2	3	4	5	6	7	8	9	10	Final
Zachary Janidlo	0	0	0	0	2	0	0	0	0	X	2
Pascal Girard 🔨	0	1	1	0	0	2	1	2	1	X	8

Sheet D	1	2	3	4	5	6	7	8	9	10	Final
William Tremblay	0	2	0	2	0	1	0	1	0	X	6
François Roberge 🔨	1	0	3	0	1	0	3	0	2	X	10

=== Draw 4 ===
Wednesday, January 15, 3:00 pm

Sheet A	1	2	3	4	5	6	7	8	9	10	Final
Alexandre Leduc 🔨	2	0	0	0	1	0	1	0	0	X	4
Julien Tremblay	0	1	1	1	0	2	0	3	2	X	10

Sheet B	1	2	3	4	5	6	7	8	9	10	Final
Robert Desjardins 🔨	2	0	0	2	0	0	0	1	0	2	7
Normand Bornais	0	1	1	0	0	1	0	0	1	0	4

Sheet C	1	2	3	4	5	6	7	8	9	10	Final
Kinley Burton 🔨	0	1	0	0	1	0	0	X	X	X	2
Pascal Gagnon	0	0	1	3	0	4	1	X	X	X	9

Sheet D	1	2	3	4	5	6	7	8	9	10	Final
Team Asselin 🔨	1	1	0	0	4	0	0	0	1	X	7
Zackary Wise	0	0	1	1	0	0	1	1	0	X	4

Sheet E	1	2	3	4	5	6	7	8	9	10	Final
Jean-Sébastien Roy 🔨	1	0	0	1	1	1	1	0	0	X	5
Raphaël Patry	0	4	1	0	0	0	0	4	1	X	10

=== Draw 5 ===
Wednesday, January 15, 8:15 pm

Sheet B	1	2	3	4	5	6	7	8	9	10	Final
Zackary Wise 🔨	1	1	0	0	1	0	1	0	1	1	6
Pascal Gagnon	0	0	1	0	0	1	0	1	0	0	3

Sheet C	1	2	3	4	5	6	7	8	9	10	Final
Jean-Sébastien Roy	0	0	1	0	0	1	2	0	0	X	4
François Roberge 🔨	1	1	0	2	0	0	0	2	1	X	7

Sheet D	1	2	3	4	5	6	7	8	9	10	Final
Normand Bornais	0	2	0	1	0	1	0	X	X	X	4
Pierre-Luc Morissette 🔨	2	0	4	0	2	0	2	X	X	X	10

Sheet E	1	2	3	4	5	6	7	8	9	10	Final
Alexandre Leduc	1	0	0	0	2	2	1	2	0	X	8
Pascal Girard 🔨	0	2	1	0	0	0	0	0	1	X	4

=== Draw 6 ===
Thursday, January 16, 9:00 am

Sheet A	1	2	3	4	5	6	7	8	9	10	Final
François Roberge	2	0	0	4	0	0	1	0	X	X	7
Zackary Wise 🔨	0	0	1	0	1	0	0	1	X	X	3

Sheet E	1	2	3	4	5	6	7	8	9	10	Final
Alexandre Leduc	1	1	0	0	1	0	2	0	1	1	7
Pierre-Luc Morissette 🔨	0	0	2	2	0	2	0	2	0	0	8

=== Draw 7 ===
Thursday, January 16, 12:45 pm

Sheet B	1	2	3	4	5	6	7	8	9	10	Final
Team Asselin 🔨	0	2	1	2	1	0	X	X	X	X	6
Raphaël Patry	0	0	0	0	0	1	X	X	X	X	1

Sheet D	1	2	3	4	5	6	7	8	9	10	Final
Robert Desjardins 🔨	0	0	1	0	0	0	0	2	0	X	3
Julien Tremblay	0	1	0	2	0	2	1	0	1	X	7

=== Draw 8 ===
Thursday, January 16, 4:30 pm

Sheet A	1	2	3	4	5	6	7	8	9	10	Final
Zachary Janidlo 🔨	2	0	0	1	1	0	0	0	1	0	5
Jean-Sébastien Roy	0	0	2	0	0	1	1	2	0	2	8

Sheet E	1	2	3	4	5	6	7	8	9	10	Final
Kinley Burton 🔨	1	0	0	1	0	2	0	1	1	3	9
Normand Bornais	0	2	1	0	1	0	2	0	0	0	6

=== Draw 9 ===
Thursday, January 16, 8:15 pm

Sheet A	1	2	3	4	5	6	7	8	9	10	Final
William Tremblay	0	1	2	0	1	0	2	0	0	X	6
Pascal Girard 🔨	2	0	0	1	0	3	0	1	1	X	8

Sheet B	1	2	3	4	5	6	7	8	9	10	Final
Robert Desjardins	0	0	2	0	0	1	2	1	0	2	8
François Roberge 🔨	0	1	0	2	2	0	0	0	1	0	6

Sheet C	1	2	3	4	5	6	7	8	9	10	11	Final
Team Asselin	0	2	2	0	0	2	0	1	0	1	0	8
Julien Tremblay 🔨	3	0	0	1	0	0	2	0	2	0	1	9

Sheet D	1	2	3	4	5	6	7	8	9	10	Final
Raphaël Patry	0	0	1	0	1	1	0	0	0	X	3
Pierre-Luc Morissette 🔨	2	0	0	1	0	0	1	2	1	X	7

Sheet E	1	2	3	4	5	6	7	8	9	10	11	Final
David Maheux 🔨	1	0	0	0	1	0	0	1	2	0	1	6
Pascal Gagnon	0	0	2	0	0	1	1	0	0	1	0	5

=== Draw 10 ===
Friday, January 17, 9:00 am

Sheet A	1	2	3	4	5	6	7	8	9	10	11	Final
François Roberge 🔨	0	0	0	1	0	2	0	4	0	1	2	10
David Maheux	2	0	1	0	1	0	3	0	1	0	0	8

Sheet B	1	2	3	4	5	6	7	8	9	10	Final
Alexandre Leduc 🔨	1	2	0	0	0	3	0	0	2	X	8
Kinley Burton	0	0	1	0	2	0	2	0	0	X	5

Sheet C	1	2	3	4	5	6	7	8	9	10	Final
Raphaël Patry 🔨	0	0	1	0	3	0	2	3	0	0	9
Pascal Girard	0	1	0	1	0	5	0	0	3	1	11

Sheet D	1	2	3	4	5	6	7	8	9	10	Final
Zackary Wise 🔨	1	0	1	0	0	1	0	1	0	X	4
Jean-Sébastien Roy	0	2	0	1	1	0	3	0	1	X	8

=== Draw 11 ===
Friday, January 17, 12:45 pm

Sheet C	1	2	3	4	5	6	7	8	9	10	Final
Pierre-Luc Morissette	0	0	1	0	1	X	X	X	X	X	2
Robert Desjardins 🔨	3	3	0	3	0	X	X	X	X	X	9

=== Draw 12 ===
Friday, January 17, 4:30 pm

Sheet B	1	2	3	4	5	6	7	8	9	10	Final
Pascal Girard	0	2	0	0	0	2	2	0	3	0	9
Jean-Sébastien Roy 🔨	2	0	1	0	2	0	0	2	0	1	8

Sheet C	1	2	3	4	5	6	7	8	9	10	Final
François Roberge 🔨	2	0	2	2	0	0	0	1	1	X	8
Alexandre Leduc	0	1	0	0	0	1	1	0	0	X	3

=== Draw 13 ===
Friday, January 17, 8:15 pm

Sheet D	1	2	3	4	5	6	7	8	9	10	Final
Team Asselin 🔨	0	3	1	0	0	0	1	0	2	X	7
Robert Desjardins	0	0	0	2	1	0	0	1	0	X	4

=== Draw 14 ===
Saturday, January 18, 9:00 am

Sheet D	1	2	3	4	5	6	7	8	9	10	Final
Pierre-Luc Morissette	0	1	0	1	0	2	0	1	0	X	5
François Roberge 🔨	1	0	3	0	1	0	0	0	2	X	7

Sheet E	1	2	3	4	5	6	7	8	9	10	Final
Robert Desjardins 🔨	1	0	1	0	0	1	0	2	0	1	6
Pascal Girard	0	1	0	0	2	0	1	0	1	0	5

== Playoffs ==
Page playoff system
A	Julien Tremblay	4
B	Team Asselin	5
C1	Robert Desjardins	9
C2	François Roberge	7

Semifinal
A	Julien Tremblay	4
C1	Robert Desjardins	7

Final
B	Team Asselin	9
C1	Robert Desjardins	3

=== A vs. B ===
Saturday, January 18, 3:30 pm

Sheet C	1	2	3	4	5	6	7	8	9	10	Final
Julien Tremblay 🔨	1	0	1	0	0	0	1	0	0	1	4
Team Asselin	0	1	0	1	0	1	0	1	1	0	5

=== C1 vs. C2 ===
Saturday, January 18, 3:30 pm

Sheet B	1	2	3	4	5	6	7	8	9	10	Final
Robert Desjardins 🔨	1	0	0	1	1	0	5	0	0	1	9
François Roberge	0	0	3	0	0	2	0	1	1	0	7

=== Semifinal ===
Sunday, January 19, 8:30 am

Sheet C	1	2	3	4	5	6	7	8	9	10	Final
Julien Tremblay 🔨	2	0	0	0	1	0	0	1	0	0	4
Robert Desjardins	0	2	1	0	0	1	0	0	2	1	7

=== Final ===
Sunday, January 19, 3:45 pm

Sheet C	1	2	3	4	5	6	7	8	9	10	Final
Team Asselin 🔨	0	2	0	1	0	2	0	2	2	X	9
Robert Desjardins	0	0	1	0	1	0	1	0	0	X	3

2025 Quebec Tankard

Jean-Michel Ménard
12th Quebec Provincial Championship title
