= 2024 Quebec Scotties Tournament of Hearts =

Curling championship in Quebec, Canada

- Host city: Drummondville, Quebec
- Arena: Centre Marcel-Dionne
- Dates: January 24–28
- Winner: Team St-Georges
- Curling club: Glenmore CC, Dollard-des-Ormeaux & CC Laval-sur-le-Lac, Laval
- Skip: Laurie St-Georges
- Third: Jamie Sinclair
- Second: Emily Riley
- Lead: Kelly Middaugh
- Alternate: Marie-France Larouche
- Finalist: Noémie Verreault

The 2024 Quebec Scotties Tournament of Hearts, the provincial women's curling championship of Quebec, was held from January 24 to 28 at the Centre Marcel-Dionne in Drummondville, Quebec. The winning Laurie St-Georges rink represented Quebec at the 2024 Scotties Tournament of Hearts in Calgary, Alberta. The event was held in conjunction with the 2024 Quebec Tankard, the provincial men's curling championship.

== Teams ==
The teams are listed as follows:

Skip	Third	Second	Lead	Alternate	Coach	Club(s)
Kelsey Boyd	Alison Davies	Erica Cull	Alyssa McKay	Christine Paradis		Glenmore/Ville Mont-Royal
Lauren Horton	Émilia Gagné	Hannah Gargul	Pamela Nugent		Neil Gargul	Glenmore/Pointe-Claire/Jacques-Cartier
Dominique Jean	Lauren Cheal	Valérie Tanguay	Laura Girard-Côté	Amélie Maheux	Julie Hamel	Montréal Ouest/Lennoxville/Chicoutimi/Trois-Rivières/Mont-Bruno
Lisianne Ouellet	Audrey Laplante	Claudie Beaulieu	Guylaine Dionne	Noémie Bélanger	Aline Fellmann	Rivière-du-Loup/Buckingham
Laurie St-Georges	Jamie Sinclair	Emily Riley	Kelly Middaugh	Marie-France Larouche		Glenmore/Laval-sur-le-Lac
Noémie Verreault	Nathalie Gagnon	Anne-Sophie Gionest	Sarah Bergeron			Chicoutimi/Riverbend

== Round robin standings ==
Final Round Robin Standings

Key
Teams to Playoffs
Teams to Tiebreaker

Skip	W	L	PF	PA	EW	EL	BE	SE
Laurie St-Georges	5	0	47	13	22	10	0	12
Noémie Verreault	3	2	34	33	20	18	1	5
Dominique Jean	3	2	33	31	18	20	2	5
Lauren Horton	3	2	36	30	21	19	2	6
Lisianne Ouellet	1	4	21	41	12	21	3	3
Kelsey Boyd	0	5	25	48	19	24	0	6

== Round robin results ==
All draw times are listed in Eastern Time (UTC-05:00).

=== Draw 1 ===
Wednesday, January 24, 4:00 pm

Sheet A	1	2	3	4	5	6	7	8	9	10	Final
Noémie Verreault	0	0	0	3	1	2	0	2	X	X	8
Dominique Jean	0	0	1	0	0	0	1	0	X	X	2

Sheet C	1	2	3	4	5	6	7	8	9	10	Final
Lisianne Ouellet	0	0	3	0	0	0	X	X	X	X	3
Laurie St-Georges	2	1	0	3	3	1	X	X	X	X	10

Sheet E	1	2	3	4	5	6	7	8	9	10	Final
Kelsey Boyd	0	1	0	0	0	1	0	X	X	X	2
Lauren Horton	1	0	2	2	1	0	3	X	X	X	9

=== Draw 2 ===
Thursday, January 25, 9:00 am

Sheet B	1	2	3	4	5	6	7	8	9	10	Final
Dominique Jean	1	0	0	0	0	0	1	X	X	X	2
Laurie St-Georges	0	1	2	2	1	2	0	X	X	X	8

Sheet C	1	2	3	4	5	6	7	8	9	10	Final
Noémie Verreault	1	0	3	0	0	1	0	0	1	0	6
Lauren Horton	0	1	0	1	1	0	2	1	0	4	10

Sheet D	1	2	3	4	5	6	7	8	9	10	Final
Kelsey Boyd	0	3	1	0	0	1	0	0	X	X	5
Lisianne Ouellet	1	0	0	2	4	0	1	3	X	X	11

=== Draw 3 ===
Thursday, January 25, 4:30 pm

Sheet B	1	2	3	4	5	6	7	8	9	10	Final
Lauren Horton	0	0	1	4	0	1	0	3	X	X	9
Lisianne Ouellet	1	0	0	0	1	0	1	0	X	X	3

Sheet C	1	2	3	4	5	6	7	8	9	10	Final
Dominique Jean	0	1	0	4	0	0	1	0	0	3	9
Kelsey Boyd	1	0	1	0	1	1	0	2	1	0	7

Sheet D	1	2	3	4	5	6	7	8	9	10	Final
Laurie St-Georges	3	0	2	0	6	X	X	X	X	X	11
Noémie Verreault	0	1	0	2	0	X	X	X	X	X	3

=== Draw 4 ===
Friday, January 26, 12:45 pm

Sheet A	1	2	3	4	5	6	7	8	9	10	Final
Lauren Horton	0	0	0	1	1	0	0	0	X	X	2
Laurie St-Georges	1	1	2	0	0	3	0	1	X	X	8

Sheet B	1	2	3	4	5	6	7	8	9	10	11	Final
Kelsey Boyd	0	2	0	0	1	0	1	2	0	2	0	8
Noémie Verreault	2	0	1	1	0	2	0	0	2	0	1	9

Sheet E	1	2	3	4	5	6	7	8	9	10	Final
Lisianne Ouellet	0	0	0	2	0	0	0	0	0	X	2
Dominique Jean	1	1	0	0	1	4	0	0	2	X	9

=== Draw 5 ===
Friday, January 26, 8:15 pm

Sheet A	1	2	3	4	5	6	7	8	9	10	Final
Lisianne Ouellet	0	0	1	1	0	0	0	X	X	X	2
Noémie Verreault	2	1	0	0	0	2	3	X	X	X	8

Sheet D	1	2	3	4	5	6	7	8	9	10	Final
Dominique Jean	0	2	0	1	0	2	3	0	3	X	11
Lauren Horton	2	0	1	0	2	0	0	1	0	X	6

Sheet E	1	2	3	4	5	6	7	8	9	10	Final
Laurie St-Georges	4	1	0	0	0	1	4	X	X	X	10
Kelsey Boyd	0	0	1	1	1	0	0	X	X	X	3

== Tiebreaker ==
Saturday, January 27, 9:00 am

Sheet B	1	2	3	4	5	6	7	8	9	10	Final
Dominique Jean	1	0	1	0	2	0	3	0	0	X	7
Lauren Horton	0	1	0	1	0	1	0	0	1	X	4

== Playoffs ==
Semifinal			Final
			1	Laurie St-Georges	8
2	Noémie Verreault	11	2	Noémie Verreault	4
3	Dominique Jean	6

=== Semifinal ===
Saturday, January 27, 8:00 pm

Sheet C	1	2	3	4	5	6	7	8	9	10	Final
Noémie Verreault	0	3	0	3	0	2	1	1	1	X	11
Dominique Jean	1	0	3	0	2	0	0	0	0	X	6

=== Final ===
Sunday, January 28, 12:00 pm

Sheet C	1	2	3	4	5	6	7	8	9	10	Final
Laurie St-Georges	0	0	2	2	0	2	1	0	1	X	8
Noémie Verreault	0	0	0	0	2	0	0	2	0	X	4

2024 Quebec Scotties Tournament of Hearts

Laurie St-Georges
2nd Quebec Provincial Championship title
