= 2024 New Year Curling in Miyota =

- Host city: Miyota, Japan
- Arena: Curling Hall Miyota
- Dates: December 29 – January 1
- Winner: (Aomori Prefecture) Team Nakamura
- Curling club: Aomori CC, Aomori
- Skip: Miori Nakamura
- Fourth: Misaki Tanaka
- Second: Haruka Kihara
- Lead: Hiyori Ichinohe
- Alternate: Yuuna Harada
- Finalist: (Hokkaido) Team Yoshimura

The 2024 WCT New Year Curling in Miyota (Japanese: WCT ニューイヤーカーリング in 御代田 2024) was held from December 29 to January 1 at the Curling Hall Miyota in Miyota, Japan. The total purse for the event was ¥ 2,000,000. It was the second event on the World Curling Tour Japan for the 2023–24 curling season.

Philoseek Aomori, represented by skip Miori Nakamura; fourth Misaki Tanaka; second Haruka Kihara, lead Hiyori Ichinohe; and alternate Yuuna Harada won the event, defeating the Fortius rink of Yuna Kotani, Kaho Onodera, Anna Ohmiya and Mina Kobayashi in the championship game.

Both teams finished undefeated through the round robin with 4–0 records to qualify for the semifinals, with Tokyo's Yui Ozeki and Karuizawa's Miyu Ueno also reaching the knockout stage with 3–1 records each. Philoseek Aomori then beat Grandir Tokyo (Ozeki) 8–3 in the semifinals while Fortius downed SC Karuizawa Club (Ueno) 6–3.

In the gold medal game, Fortius scored two in the third, and a single in the fourth, for a 3–1 lead at the half. In the second half, however, Philoseek Aomori mounted a comeback, scoring five consecutive points to win the match 6–3. It was the Nakamura rinks second tour final appearance as they also reached the final of the 2023 Curlers Corner Autumn Gold Curling Classic.

Surprisingly, the two highest ranked teams going into the event, South Korea's Ha Seung-youn, and the United States' Delaney Strouse, missed the playoffs with 2–2 records each.

== Teams ==
The teams are listed as follows:

Skip	Third	Second	Lead	Alternate	Locale
Ha Seung-youn	Kim Hye-rin	Yang Tae-i	Kim Su-jin		Chuncheon, South Korea
Mayu Minami	Kana Ogawa	Mizuki Saito	Moe Nomoto	Mika Okuyama	(Hokkaido) Sapporo, Japan
Misaki Tanaka (Fourth)	Miori Nakamura (Skip)	Haruka Kihara	Hiyori Ichinohe	Yuuna Harada	(Aomori Prefecture) Aomori, Japan
Yui Ozeki	Mao Ishigaki	Hinako Sonobe	Haruka Hosoda		Tokyo, Japan
Kotoka Segawa	Ayuka Segawa	Mio Sasaki	Mei Shimohori		(Iwate Prefecture) Iwate, Japan
Delaney Strouse	Anne O'Hara	Sydney Mullaney	Rebecca Rodgers	Susan Dudt	(United States) Traverse City, Michigan
Yumi Suzuki	Aki Goto	Kyoka Kuramitsu	Miho Fujimori	Runa Miura	Tokyo, Japan
Kai Tsuchiya	Yumiko Kashiwagi	Manami Anzai	Rin Komiyama		(Nagano Prefecture) Miyota, Japan
Miyu Ueno	Asuka Kanai	Junko Nishimuro	Yui Ueno	Mone Ryokawa	(Nagano Prefecture) Karuizawa, Japan
Yuna Kotani (Note: As skip Sayaka Yoshimura was on maternity leave, the rest of the team moved up the lineup a position.)	Kaho Onodera	Anna Ohmiya	Mina Kobayashi		(Hokkaido) Sapporo, Japan

== Round robin standings ==
Final Round Robin Standings

Key
Teams to Playoffs

Pool A	W	L	PF	PA
(Aomori Prefecture) Miori Nakamura	4	0	32	16
(Nagano Prefecture) Miyu Ueno	3	1	25	14
(South Korea) Ha Seung-youn	2	2	21	25
(Tokyo) Yumi Suzuki	1	3	20	25
(Iwate Prefecture) Kotoka Segawa	0	4	15	33

Pool B	W	L	PF	PA
(Hokkaido) Team Yoshimura	4	0	35	18
(Tokyo) Yui Ozeki	3	1	28	22
(United States) Delaney Strouse	2	2	20	25
(Nagano Prefecture) Kai Tsuchiya	1	3	27	35
(Hokkaido) Mayu Minami	0	4	21	31

== Round robin results ==
All draw times are listed in Japan Standard Time (UTC+09:00).

=== Draw 1 ===
Friday, December 29, 8:30 am

Sheet A	1	2	3	4	5	6	7	8	Final
(Nagano Prefecture) Miyu Ueno 🔨	0	2	1	0	2	2	2	X	9
(Iwate Prefecture) Kotoka Segawa	1	0	0	1	0	0	0	X	2

Sheet B	1	2	3	4	5	6	7	8	Final
(South Korea) Ha Seung-youn	2	0	0	0	1	2	0	X	5
(Aomori Prefecture) Miori Nakamura 🔨	0	1	3	2	0	0	4	X	10

=== Draw 2 ===
Friday, December 29, 12:20 pm

Sheet A	1	2	3	4	5	6	7	8	Final
(Hokkaido) Team Yoshimura 🔨	2	0	1	0	5	0	4	X	12
(Nagano Prefecture) Kai Tsuchiya	0	1	0	4	0	3	0	X	8

Sheet B	1	2	3	4	5	6	7	8	Final
(United States) Delaney Strouse	0	3	1	1	0	1	0	0	6
(Hokkaido) Mayu Minami 🔨	1	0	0	0	1	0	1	1	4

=== Draw 3 ===
Friday, December 29, 4:10 pm

Sheet A	1	2	3	4	5	6	7	8	Final
(South Korea) Ha Seung-youn 🔨	0	1	1	0	2	1	1	X	6
(Tokyo) Yumi Suzuki	2	0	0	1	0	0	0	X	3

Sheet B	1	2	3	4	5	6	7	8	Final
(Aomori Prefecture) Miori Nakamura 🔨	1	2	2	0	0	2	2	X	9
(Iwate Prefecture) Kotoka Segawa	0	0	0	1	2	0	0	X	3

=== Draw 4 ===
Friday, December 29, 8:00 pm

Sheet A	1	2	3	4	5	6	7	8	Final
(United States) Delaney Strouse	1	0	0	1	0	1	0	X	3
(Tokyo) Yui Ozeki 🔨	0	2	2	0	1	0	3	X	8

Sheet B	1	2	3	4	5	6	7	8	Final
(Hokkaido) Mayu Minami 🔨	3	0	0	0	0	3	1	X	7
(Nagano Prefecture) Kai Tsuchiya	0	4	2	2	1	0	0	X	9

=== Draw 5 ===
Saturday, December 30, 9:00 am

Sheet A	1	2	3	4	5	6	7	8	Final
(Aomori Prefecture) Miori Nakamura 🔨	1	0	0	1	2	2	0	X	6
(Nagano Prefecture) Miyu Ueno	0	1	0	0	0	0	1	X	2

Sheet B	1	2	3	4	5	6	7	8	Final
(Iwate Prefecture) Kotoka Segawa 🔨	1	0	0	0	3	0	2	0	6
(Tokyo) Yumi Suzuki	0	0	1	1	0	3	0	2	7

=== Draw 6 ===
Saturday, December 30, 1:00 pm

Sheet A	1	2	3	4	5	6	7	8	Final
(Hokkaido) Mayu Minami 🔨	1	0	2	0	1	0	0	X	4
(Hokkaido) Team Yoshimura	0	1	0	2	0	3	1	X	7

Sheet B	1	2	3	4	5	6	7	8	Final
(Nagano Prefecture) Kai Tsuchiya	0	2	0	1	2	0	0	1	6
(Tokyo) Yui Ozeki 🔨	2	0	2	0	0	2	2	0	8

=== Draw 7 ===
Saturday, December 30, 5:00 pm

Sheet A	1	2	3	4	5	6	7	8	Final
(Tokyo) Yumi Suzuki	0	0	3	0	0	1	1	1	6
(Aomori Prefecture) Miori Nakamura 🔨	2	1	0	1	3	0	0	0	7

Sheet B	1	2	3	4	5	6	7	8	Final
(Nagano Prefecture) Miyu Ueno 🔨	4	0	1	2	1	0	X	X	8
(South Korea) Ha Seung-youn	0	1	0	0	0	1	X	X	2

=== Draw 8 ===
Sunday, December 31, 9:00 am

Sheet A	1	2	3	4	5	6	7	8	Final
(Tokyo) Yui Ozeki 🔨	0	2	0	2	0	3	0	2	9
(Hokkaido) Mayu Minami	1	0	2	0	2	0	1	0	6

Sheet B	1	2	3	4	5	6	7	8	Final
(Hokkaido) Team Yoshimura 🔨	0	3	0	1	0	4	1	X	9
(United States) Delaney Strouse	0	0	2	0	1	0	0	X	3

=== Draw 9 ===
Sunday, December 31, 1:00 pm

Sheet A	1	2	3	4	5	6	7	8	Final
(Iwate Prefecture) Kotoka Segawa 🔨	1	0	0	2	1	0	0	X	4
(South Korea) Ha Seung-youn	0	2	1	0	0	4	1	X	8

Sheet B	1	2	3	4	5	6	7	8	Final
(Tokyo) Yumi Suzuki	0	0	2	0	0	1	1	0	4
(Nagano Prefecture) Miyu Ueno 🔨	2	0	0	0	2	0	0	2	6

=== Draw 10 ===
Sunday, December 31, 5:00 pm

Sheet A	1	2	3	4	5	6	7	8	Final
(Nagano Prefecture) Kai Tsuchiya 🔨	1	0	1	1	1	0	0	X	4
(United States) Delaney Strouse	0	1	0	0	0	3	4	X	8

Sheet B	1	2	3	4	5	6	7	8	Final
(Tokyo) Yui Ozeki 🔨	1	0	0	0	0	0	2	0	3
(Hokkaido) Team Yoshimura	0	2	1	0	0	1	0	3	7

== Playoffs ==
Semifinals
A1	(Aomori Prefecture) Miori Nakamura	8
B2	(Tokyo) Yui Ozeki	3
B1	(Hokkaido) Team Yoshimura	6
A2	(Nagano Prefecture) Miyu Ueno	3

Final
A1	(Aomori Prefecture) Miori Nakamura	6
B1	(Hokkaido) Team Yoshimura	3

=== Semifinals ===
Monday, January 1, 8:30 am

Sheet A	1	2	3	4	5	6	7	8	Final
(Hokkaido) Team Yoshimura	0	1	0	1	0	2	1	1	6
(Nagano Prefecture) Miyu Ueno 🔨	1	0	1	0	1	0	0	0	3

Sheet B	1	2	3	4	5	6	7	8	Final
(Aomori Prefecture) Miori Nakamura	0	1	1	3	1	0	2	X	8
(Tokyo) Yui Ozeki 🔨	1	0	0	0	0	2	0	X	3

=== Final ===
Monday, January 1, 1:00 pm

Sheet B	1	2	3	4	5	6	7	8	Final
(Aomori Prefecture) Miori Nakamura 🔨	0	1	0	0	2	1	1	1	6
(Hokkaido) Team Yoshimura	0	0	2	1	0	0	0	0	3
