= 2024 Quebec Tankard =

2024 Hardline Quebec Tankard
- Host city: Drummondville, Quebec
- Arena: Centre Marcel-Dionne
- Dates: January 23–28
- Winner: Team Arsenault
- Curling club: CC Etchemin, Lévis, CC Chicoutimi, Chicoutimi & CC Kénogami, Kénogami
- Skip: Jean-Michel Arsenault
- Fourth: Julien Tremblay
- Second: Jesse Mullen
- Lead: Phillipe Brassard
- Finalist: Félix Asselin

The 2024 Hardline Quebec Tankard, the provincial men's curling championship of Quebec, was held from January 23 to 28 at the Centre Marcel-Dionne in Drummondville, Quebec. The winning Jean-Michel Arsenault rink will represent Quebec at the 2024 Montana's Brier in Regina, Saskatchewan. The event was held in conjunction with the 2024 Quebec Scotties Tournament of Hearts, the provincial women's curling championship.

== Qualification process ==
Qualification method	Berths	Qualifying team(s)
2023 Quebec Tankard champion	1	Félix Asselin
Circuit Final winner	1	Yannick Martel
CTRS Leaders	3	Robert Desjardins; Jean-Michel Arsenault; Zackary Wise
Provincial Circuit Points	3	Mathieu Gravel; Frederic Lawton; Mathieu Paquet
Regional Qualification Tournaments	6	Mathieu Beaufort; Normand Bornais; Pascal Gagnon; Jasmin Gibeau; Pascal Girard; Denis Jolin
Last Chance Qualifier	2	Dominique Gilbert; Alexandre Leduc

== Teams ==
The teams are listed as follows:

Skip	Third	Second	Lead	Alternate	Club(s)
Julien Tremblay (Fourth)	Jean-Michel Arsenault (Skip)	Jesse Mullen	Phillipe Brassard		Etchemin / Chicoutimi / Kénogami
Félix Asselin	Martin Crête	Émile Asselin	Jean-François Trépanier	Pierre Charette	Glenmore / Belvédère / Valleyfield / Etchemin
Mathieu Beaufort	Simon Benoit	Maxime Benoit	Patrick Doyon		Aurèle-Racine
Normand Bornais	Samuel Bornais-Doucet	David Jutras	François Bornais-Doucet	Patrick Martin	Jacques-Cartier
Robert Desjardins	François Gionest	Pierre-Luc Morissette	René Dubois		Chicoutimi / Riverbend / Jacques-Cartier
Pascal Gagnon	Serge St-Germain	Emry Blanchard	Xavier Roy	Philippe Simard	Noranda / Belvédère
Jasmin Gibeau	Sylvain Bellavance	Marc-Antoine Biron	Kevin Menard	Richard Faguy	Buckingham / Thusro / Boucherville
Dominique Gilbert	Simon Morissette	Patrick Baril	Philippe Paris Lafrance	Donald Boivin	Sherbrooke
Pascal Girard	Steeve Otis	Mario Gagnon	Remi Savard	Mathieu Hamel	Chicoutimi / Kénogami
Mathieu Gravel	Sonny Melançon	Mathieu Julien Côté	Alexandre Michaud	Yvan Lafrenière	Belvédère
Denis Jolin	Ghislain East	Robert Gaudet	Pierre Pilon	Mario Ricard	Noranda
Frederic Lawton	Matthew Kennerknecht	David Miles	Charles Gagnon	Adam Freilich	Baie d'Urfé / Glenmore
Alexandre Leduc	François Hallé	Martin Trépanier	David-Lee Amos		Valleyfield
Yannick Martel	Jean-François Charest	James Trahan	Louis-François Brassard		Chicoutimi / Lacolle
Pierre Lajoie (Fourth)	Vincent Fortin	Maxime Bilodeau	Mathieu Paquet (Skip)	Pascal Chouinard	Jacques-Cartier
Zackary Wise	Michael Solomon	Stewart Yaxley	Tyler Lachance	Adam Cartwright	Glenmore

== Knockout brackets ==
=== A event ===
First Knockout	Qualifier 1
Félix Asselin	9
Denis Jolin	3
Félix Asselin	8
Mathieu Paquet	3
Alexandre Leduc	3
Mathieu Paquet	9
Félix Asselin	9
Robert Desjardins	5
Jasmin Gibeau	5
Pascal Girard	7
Pascal Girard	4
Robert Desjardins	10
Robert Desjardins	9
Mathieu Gravel	2
Félix Asselin	3
Jean-Michel Arsenault	8
Yannick Martel	7
Pascal Gagnon	6
Yannick Martel	11
Zackary Wise	6
Zackary Wise	8
Normand Bornais	4
Yannick Martel	3
Jean-Michel Arsenault	7
Mathieu Beaufort	7
Frederic Lawton	3
Mathieu Beaufort	3
Jean-Michel Arsenault	8
Jean-Michel Arsenault	9
Dominique Gilbert	4

=== B event ===
Second Knockout	Qualifier 2
Félix Asselin	9
Jasmin Gibeau	3
Robert Desjardins	3
Jasmin Gibeau	10
Mathieu Beaufort	2
Denis Jolin	6	Alexandre Leduc	8
Alexandre Leduc	10	Alexandre Leduc	6
Jasmin Gibeau	7
Zackary Wise	4
Jasmin Gibeau	8	Jasmin Gibeau	8
Mathieu Gravel	4	Jasmin Gibeau	5
Yannick Martel	4
Yannick Martel	8
Pascal Girard	5
Pascal Girard	10
Pascal Gagnon	12	Pascal Gagnon	4
Normand Bornais	3	Pascal Girard	10
Mathieu Paquet	6
Mathieu Paquet	10
Frederic Lawton	9	Frederic Lawton	4
Dominique Gilbert	3

=== C event ===
Third knockout	Qualifier 3
Robert Desjardins	7
Normand Bornais	8	Normand Bornais	6	Jasmin Gibeau	8
Mathieu Beaufort	6	Robert Desjardins	12	Robert Desjardins	3
Mathieu Paquet	5
Mathieu Paquet	8
Denis Jolin	4	Pascal Gagnon	3
Pascal Gagnon	6

Third knockout	Qualifier 4
Pascal Girard	5
Mathieu Gravel	7	Mathieu Gravel	7	Yannick Martel	10
Frederic Lawton	5	Mathieu Gravel	11	Mathieu Gravel	4
Alexandre Leduc	7
Alexandre Leduc	7
Dominique Gilbert	4	Zackary Wise	2
Zackary Wise	9

== Knockout results ==
All draw times are listed in Eastern Time (UTC-05:00).

=== Draw 1 ===
Tuesday, January 23, 1:30 pm

Sheet B	1	2	3	4	5	6	7	8	9	10	Final
Félix Asselin	1	0	4	0	4	X	X	X	X	X	9
Denis Jolin	0	1	0	2	0	X	X	X	X	X	3

Sheet C	1	2	3	4	5	6	7	8	9	10	Final
Yannick Martel	1	0	0	3	0	0	3	0	0	0	7
Pascal Gagnon	0	0	1	0	0	1	0	2	1	1	6

Sheet D	1	2	3	4	5	6	7	8	9	10	Final
Jasmin Gibeau	0	0	3	0	0	1	0	1	0	0	5
Pascal Girard	0	0	0	1	1	0	2	0	2	1	7

Sheet E	1	2	3	4	5	6	7	8	9	10	Final
Mathieu Beaufort	1	0	1	0	1	0	1	0	2	1	7
Frederic Lawton	0	0	0	1	0	1	0	1	0	0	3

=== Draw 2 ===
Tuesday, January 23, 5:30 pm

Sheet B	1	2	3	4	5	6	7	8	9	10	Final
Alexandre Leduc	0	0	0	1	0	0	1	1	0	0	3
Mathieu Paquet	2	0	1	0	1	0	0	0	1	4	9

Sheet C	1	2	3	4	5	6	7	8	9	10	Final
Zackary Wise	0	1	2	0	1	0	0	3	1	X	8
Normand Bornais	0	0	0	2	0	1	1	0	0	X	4

Sheet D	1	2	3	4	5	6	7	8	9	10	Final
Robert Desjardins	1	3	2	0	0	0	2	1	X	X	9
Mathieu Gravel	0	0	0	0	1	1	0	0	X	X	2

Sheet E	1	2	3	4	5	6	7	8	9	10	Final
Jean-Michel Arsenault	0	0	5	2	0	0	1	0	1	X	9
Dominique Gilbert	0	0	0	0	1	2	0	1	0	X	4

=== Draw 3 ===
Wednesday, January 24, 8:30 am

Sheet A	1	2	3	4	5	6	7	8	9	10	Final
Jasmin Gibeau	3	0	0	3	0	1	0	0	1	X	8
Mathieu Gravel	0	1	0	0	1	0	0	2	0	X	4

Sheet B	1	2	3	4	5	6	7	8	9	10	Final
Pascal Gagnon	0	5	4	3	0	X	X	X	X	X	12
Normand Bornais	1	0	0	0	2	X	X	X	X	X	3

Sheet C	1	2	3	4	5	6	7	8	9	10	Final
Denis Jolin	0	0	2	0	1	2	0	1	0	0	6
Alexandre Leduc	1	2	0	2	0	0	2	0	2	1	10

Sheet D	1	2	3	4	5	6	7	8	9	10	Final
Frederic Lawton	0	3	0	1	0	4	1	X	X	X	9
Dominique Gilbert	1	0	1	0	1	0	0	X	X	X	3

=== Draw 4 ===
Wednesday, January 24, 12:15 pm

Sheet A	1	2	3	4	5	6	7	8	9	10	Final
Yannick Martel	2	0	3	3	0	0	0	3	X	X	11
Zackary Wise	0	3	0	0	1	1	1	0	X	X	6

Sheet B	1	2	3	4	5	6	7	8	9	10	Final
Pascal Girard	1	0	1	0	1	0	1	0	X	X	4
Robert Desjardins	0	3	0	0	0	4	0	3	X	X	10

Sheet C	1	2	3	4	5	6	7	8	9	10	Final
Mathieu Beaufort	0	0	1	0	0	0	0	2	0	X	3
Jean-Michel Arsenault	2	1	0	0	1	1	1	0	2	X	8

Sheet D	1	2	3	4	5	6	7	8	9	10	Final
Félix Asselin	0	1	0	2	0	2	3	X	X	X	8
Mathieu Paquet	1	0	1	0	1	0	0	X	X	X	3

=== Draw 5 ===
Wednesday, January 24, 8:30 pm

Sheet A	1	2	3	4	5	6	7	8	9	10	Final
Pascal Girard	1	0	3	1	0	2	1	2	X	X	10
Pascal Gagnon	0	2	0	0	2	0	0	0	X	X	4

Sheet B	1	2	3	4	5	6	7	8	9	10	Final
Zackary Wise	0	0	2	0	1	1	0	0	0	X	4
Jasmin Gibeau	2	0	0	1	0	0	1	2	2	X	8

Sheet C	1	2	3	4	5	6	7	8	9	10	Final
Mathieu Paquet	0	2	0	2	1	1	0	4	X	X	10
Frederic Lawton	1	0	2	0	0	0	1	0	X	X	4

Sheet D	1	2	3	4	5	6	7	8	9	10	Final
Mathieu Beaufort	0	0	0	2	0	0	0	X	X	X	2
Alexandre Leduc	2	1	1	0	2	1	1	X	X	X	8

=== Draw 6 ===
Thursday, January 25, 9:00 am

Sheet A	1	2	3	4	5	6	7	8	9	10	11	Final
Alexandre Leduc	1	0	2	0	1	0	0	0	1	1	0	6
Jasmin Gibeau	0	2	0	2	0	2	0	0	0	0	1	7

Sheet E	1	2	3	4	5	6	7	8	9	10	Final
Pascal Girard	0	0	1	0	2	0	1	4	1	1	10
Mathieu Paquet	0	1	0	3	0	2	0	0	0	0	6

=== Draw 7 ===
Thursday, January 25, 12:45 pm

Sheet B	1	2	3	4	5	6	7	8	9	10	Final
Yannick Martel	0	1	0	0	1	0	1	0	X	X	3
Jean-Michel Arsenault	2	0	0	1	0	2	0	2	X	X	7

Sheet C	1	2	3	4	5	6	7	8	9	10	Final
Félix Asselin	2	1	1	0	2	0	0	3	X	X	9
Robert Desjardins	0	0	0	4	0	1	0	0	X	X	5

=== Draw 8 ===
Thursday, January 25, 4:30 pm

Sheet A	1	2	3	4	5	6	7	8	9	10	Final
Yannick Martel	1	0	2	4	0	0	1	0	0	X	8
Pascal Girard	0	2	0	0	1	1	0	0	1	X	5

Sheet E	1	2	3	4	5	6	7	8	9	10	Final
Robert Desjardins	0	0	1	0	2	0	X	X	X	X	3
Jasmin Gibeau	4	2	0	2	0	2	X	X	X	X	10

=== Draw 9 ===
Thursday, January 25, 8:15 pm

Sheet A	1	2	3	4	5	6	7	8	9	10	Final
Normand Bornais	0	0	1	1	0	0	4	1	0	1	8
Mathieu Beaufort	1	2	0	0	1	0	0	0	2	0	6

Sheet B	1	2	3	4	5	6	7	8	9	10	Final
Mathieu Gravel	1	0	0	0	3	1	1	0	0	1	7
Frederic Lawton	0	1	1	0	0	0	0	1	2	0	5

Sheet C	1	2	3	4	5	6	7	8	9	10	Final
Dominique Gilbert	0	1	0	2	0	0	1	0	X	X	4
Zackary Wise	1	0	1	0	3	2	0	2	X	X	9

Sheet D	1	2	3	4	5	6	7	8	9	10	Final
Denis Jolin	0	0	0	1	0	0	0	2	1	0	4
Pascal Gagnon	0	0	3	0	0	0	1	0	0	2	6

Sheet E	1	2	3	4	5	6	7	8	9	10	Final
Félix Asselin	0	1	0	0	0	0	2	0	X	X	3
Jean-Michel Arsenault	0	0	3	1	1	1	0	2	X	X	8

=== Draw 10 ===
Friday, January 26, 9:00 am

Sheet B	1	2	3	4	5	6	7	8	9	10	Final
Mathieu Paquet	1	0	0	1	0	2	0	3	1	X	8
Pascal Gagnon	0	1	0	0	0	0	2	0	0	X	3

Sheet C	1	2	3	4	5	6	7	8	9	10	11	Final
Robert Desjardins	0	3	0	1	0	0	1	0	0	1	1	7
Normand Bornais	1	0	1	0	1	1	0	0	2	0	0	6

Sheet D	1	2	3	4	5	6	7	8	9	10	Final
Pascal Girard	2	0	0	1	0	1	0	0	1	X	5
Mathieu Gravel	0	0	1	0	2	0	3	1	0	X	7

Sheet E	1	2	3	4	5	6	7	8	9	10	Final
Alexandre Leduc	2	1	0	0	1	2	0	1	X	X	7
Zackary Wise	0	0	0	1	0	0	1	0	X	X	2

=== Draw 11 ===
Friday, January 26, 12:45 pm

Sheet D	1	2	3	4	5	6	7	8	9	10	Final
Jasmin Gibeau	1	1	0	0	0	1	0	1	0	1	5
Yannick Martel	0	0	1	1	1	0	0	0	1	0	4

=== Draw 12 ===
Friday, January 26, 4:30 pm

Sheet A	1	2	3	4	5	6	7	8	9	10	Final
Robert Desjardins	0	3	2	0	1	0	6	X	X	X	12
Mathieu Paquet	2	0	0	2	0	1	0	X	X	X	5

Sheet B	1	2	3	4	5	6	7	8	9	10	Final
Mathieu Gravel	0	2	3	0	1	0	2	0	2	1	11
Alexandre Leduc	2	0	0	2	0	2	0	1	0	0	7

=== Draw 13 ===
Friday, January 26, 8:15 pm

Sheet B	1	2	3	4	5	6	7	8	9	10	Final
Félix Asselin	3	1	1	0	2	0	2	X	X	X	9
Jasmin Gibeau	0	0	0	2	0	1	0	X	X	X	3

=== Draw 14 ===
Saturday, January 27, 9:00 am

Sheet C	1	2	3	4	5	6	7	8	9	10	Final
Yannick Martel	2	0	0	2	0	3	0	1	2	X	10
Mathieu Gravel	0	1	1	0	1	0	1	0	0	X	4

Sheet D	1	2	3	4	5	6	7	8	9	10	Final
Jasmin Gibeau	1	0	0	0	3	0	3	1	X	X	8
Robert Desjardins	0	1	0	0	0	2	0	0	X	X	3

== Playoffs ==
Page playoff system
A	Jean-Michel Arsenault	6
B	Félix Asselin	8
C1	Jasmin Gibeau	10
C2	Yannick Martel	9

Semifinal
A	Jean-Michel Arsenault	9
C1	Jasmin Gibeau	2

Final
B	Félix Asselin	6
A	Jean-Michel Arsenault	7

=== A vs. B ===
Saturday, January 27, 3:30 pm

Sheet C	1	2	3	4	5	6	7	8	9	10	Final
Jean-Michel Arsenault	1	0	0	1	0	2	0	0	2	0	6
Félix Asselin	0	1	1	0	2	0	2	0	0	2	8

=== C1 vs. C2 ===
Saturday, January 27, 3:30 pm

Sheet D	1	2	3	4	5	6	7	8	9	10	Final
Jasmin Gibeau	1	0	3	0	3	0	2	1	0	0	10
Yannick Martel	0	1	0	3	0	3	0	0	1	1	9

=== Semifinal ===
Sunday, January 28, 8:30 am

Sheet C	1	2	3	4	5	6	7	8	9	10	Final
Jean-Michel Arsenault	0	3	0	0	2	0	3	1	X	X	9
Jasmin Gibeau	0	0	1	0	0	1	0	0	X	X	2

=== Final ===
Sunday, January 28, 3:45 pm

Sheet C	1	2	3	4	5	6	7	8	9	10	11	Final
Félix Asselin	1	0	0	0	2	0	1	0	0	2	0	6
Jean-Michel Arsenault	0	0	0	2	0	2	0	1	1	0	1	7

2024 Quebec Tankard

Jean-Michel Arsenault
1st Quebec Provincial Championship title
