= 2025 Ontario Women's Curling Championship =

Canadian provincial women's curling championship

- Host city: Cobourg, Ontario
- Arena: Cobourg Community Centre
- Dates: January 20–26
- Winner: Team Inglis
- Curling club: Ottawa Hunt & Golf Club, Ottawa
- Skip: Danielle Inglis
- Third: Kira Brunton
- Second: Calissa Daly
- Lead: Cassandra de Groot
- Coach: Steve Acorn
- Finalist: Chelsea Brandwood

The 2025 Ontario Women's Curling Championship, was held from January 20 to 26 at Cobourg Community Centre in Cobourg, Ontario. It serves as the provincial women's curling championship for Southern Ontario. The winning Danielle Inglis rink represented Ontario at the 2025 Scotties Tournament of Hearts, Canada's national women's curling championship in Thunder Bay, Ontario. The event was held in conjunction with the 2025 Ontario Tankard, the provincial men's curling championship. Both events are held together in non-Olympic years.

Cobourg was chosen as the host community in June 2024. It last hosted the Ontario Championship in 2017.

== Qualification process ==
Twelve teams qualified for the 2025 Ontario Women's Championship. The top eight southern Ontario teams on the Canada Team Ranking System (CTRS) as of December 16, 2024 qualified, as well as four teams from an open qualifier. The number one ranked team in Canada according to the CTRS, Rachel Homan, will be Team Canada at the national Scotties after their win at the national Scotties last year, bypassing the provincial championship.

Qualification method	Berths	Qualifying team(s)
CTRS standings	8	Danielle Inglis; Chelsea Brandwood; Breanna Rozon; Shelley Hardy; Isabelle Ladouceur; Hollie Duncan; Katie Ford; Jessica Corrado
Open Qualifier	4	Carly Howard; Hailey Armstrong; Cathy Auld; Julia Markle

== Teams ==
The teams are listed as follows:

Skip	Third	Second	Lead	Alternate	Coach	Club
Hailey Armstrong	Grace Holyoke	Evelyn Robert	Alice Holyoke		Mike Fournier	High Park Club, Toronto
Cathy Auld	Erin Morrissey	Erica Hopson	Kim Cooper			Ottawa CC, Ottawa
Chelsea Brandwood	Lauren Horton	Brenda Chapman	Keira McLaughlin		John Gabel	Niagara Falls CC, Niagara Falls
Kaitlin Jewer	Kristina Brauch	Jessica Corrado (skip)	Karen Rowsell	Jessica Byers	Lynne Corrado	Lakefield CC, Lakefield
Hollie Duncan	Megan Balsdon	Julie Tippin	Kelly Middaugh		Sherry Middaugh	Woodstock CC, Woodstock
Katie Ford	Emily Middaugh	Madison Fisher	Tori Zemmelink		Wayne Middaugh	KW Granite Club, Waterloo
Shelley Hardy	Stephanie Mumford	Abby Deschene	Stephanie Corrado			Sarnia G&CC, Sarnia
Carly Howard	Katelyn Wasylkiw	Lynn Kreviazuk	Laura Hickey		Glenn Howard	Milton CC, Milton
Danielle Inglis	Kira Brunton	Calissa Daly	Cassandra de Groot		Steve Acorn	Ottawa H&GC, Ottawa
Isabelle Ladouceur	Grace Lloyd	Michaela Robert	Rachel Steele	Lori Eddy	Maurice Wilson	Whitby CC, Whitby
Julia Markle	Paige Brown	Kailee Delaney	Emma Rebel	Sadie McCutcheon		Navan CC, Navan, Ottawa
Breanna Rozon	Chrissy Cadorin	Leigh Armstrong	Jillian Page	Stephanie Thompson	Matthew Lowe	Oshawa G&CC, Oshawa

=== Map of teams ===
Ontario Women's Curling Championship Teams

== Knockout Brackets ==
=== A Event ===
First Knockout	Qualifier 1
Chelsea Brandwood	8
Jessica Corrado	6	Carly Howard	6
Carly Howard	8	Chelsea Brandwood	6
Isabelle Ladouceur	5
Shelley Hardy	2
Isabelle Ladouceur	8	Isabelle Ladouceur	9
Cathy Auld	6	Chelsea Brandwood	8
Hailey Armstrong	9
Danielle Inglis	6
Hollie Duncan	6	Hollie Duncan	7
Julia Markle	5	Hollie Duncan	6
Hailey Armstrong	10
Breanna Rozon	6
Katie Ford	5	Hailey Armstrong	9
Hailey Armstrong	8

=== B Event ===
Second Knockout	Qualifier 2
Jessica Corrado	3
Shelley Hardy	10	Shelley Hardy	11
Hollie Duncan	5
Shelley Hardy	6
Katie Ford	3	Danielle Inglis	10
Danielle Inglis	6	Danielle Inglis	6
Isabelle Ladouceur	5
Danielle Inglis	8
Julia Markle	12	Chelsea Brandwood	5
Breanna Rozon	4	Julia Markle	7
Cathy Auld	5	Carly Howard	8
Carly Howard	6	Carly Howard	1
Chelsea Brandwood	8

=== C Event ===
Third Knockout				Qualifier 3
		Carly Howard	10
Jessica Corrado	4	Katie Ford	1
Katie Ford	9			Carly Howard	7
				Julia Markle	6
		Julia Markle	9
		Shelley Hardy	7

Third Knockout	Qualifier 4
Breanna Rozon	7
Chelsea Brandwood	6
Hollie Duncan	2
Breanna Rozon	3	Isabelle Ladouceur	4
Isabelle Ladouceur	8
Cathy Auld	5
Isabelle Ladouceur	6

== Knockout Results ==
All draws are listed in Eastern Time (UTC−05:00).

=== Draw 2 ===
Monday, January 20, 2:00 pm

Sheet A	1	2	3	4	5	6	7	8	9	10	Final
Jessica Corrado	0	1	0	1	0	2	0	1	1	0	6
Carly Howard 🔨	0	0	2	0	4	0	1	0	0	1	8

Sheet B	1	2	3	4	5	6	7	8	9	10	Final
Katie Ford 🔨	0	0	2	0	0	0	2	1	0	X	5
Hailey Armstrong	2	0	0	1	1	2	0	0	2	X	8

Sheet C	1	2	3	4	5	6	7	8	9	10	Final
Hollie Duncan	0	0	2	3	0	1	0	0	0	X	6
Julia Markle 🔨	0	1	0	0	3	0	0	0	1	X	5

Sheet D	1	2	3	4	5	6	7	8	9	10	Final
Isabelle Ladouceur 🔨	2	0	0	2	0	0	0	3	0	1	8
Cathy Auld	0	0	0	0	1	3	1	0	1	0	6

=== Draw 4 ===
Tuesday, January 21, 9:00 am

Sheet A	1	2	3	4	5	6	7	8	9	10	Final
Shelley Hardy	0	0	2	0	0	0	0	0	X	X	2
Isabelle Ladouceur 🔨	0	2	0	1	1	1	3	1	X	X	9

Sheet B	1	2	3	4	5	6	7	8	9	10	Final
Chelsea Brandwood	0	1	2	0	3	0	0	2	0	X	8
Carly Howard 🔨	2	0	0	1	0	1	1	0	1	X	6

Sheet C	1	2	3	4	5	6	7	8	9	10	Final
Breanna Rozon	0	1	2	1	0	1	0	0	1	X	6
Hailey Armstrong 🔨	2	0	0	0	1	0	3	3	0	X	9

Sheet D	1	2	3	4	5	6	7	8	9	10	Final
Danielle Inglis 🔨	1	1	1	0	2	0	1	0	0	0	6
Hollie Duncan	0	0	0	1	0	1	0	1	3	1	7

=== Draw 6 ===
Tuesday, January 21, 7:00 pm

Sheet A	1	2	3	4	5	6	7	8	9	10	Final
Cathy Auld	0	0	1	0	1	0	0	2	1	0	5
Carly Howard 🔨	1	0	0	3	0	0	1	0	0	1	6

Sheet B	1	2	3	4	5	6	7	8	9	10	Final
Julia Markle 🔨	1	2	0	2	0	1	1	1	4	X	12
Breanna Rozon	0	0	2	0	2	0	0	0	0	X	4

Sheet C	1	2	3	4	5	6	7	8	9	10	Final
Katie Ford	0	1	0	0	0	0	0	0	2	X	3
Danielle Inglis 🔨	1	0	0	1	1	1	1	1	0	X	6

Sheet D	1	2	3	4	5	6	7	8	9	10	Final
Jessica Corrado 🔨	2	0	0	0	1	0	0	0	X	X	3
Shelley Hardy	0	2	0	3	0	2	1	2	X	X	10

=== Draw 7 ===
Wednesday, January 22, 9:00 am

Sheet B	1	2	3	4	5	6	7	8	9	10	Final
Jessica Corrado	0	1	0	1	0	1	0	1	X	X	4
Katie Ford 🔨	3	0	1	0	4	0	1	0	X	X	9

=== Draw 8 ===
Wednesday, January 22, 2:00 pm

Sheet A	1	2	3	4	5	6	7	8	9	10	Final
Hollie Duncan 🔨	0	1	0	3	0	1	0	0	1	0	6
Hailey Armstrong	1	0	2	0	1	0	2	1	0	3	10

Sheet C	1	2	3	4	5	6	7	8	9	10	Final
Chelsea Brandwood	0	2	0	0	0	2	0	1	0	1	6
Isabelle Ladouceur 🔨	1	0	0	0	1	0	1	0	2	0	5

=== Draw 9 ===
Wednesday, January 22, 7:00 pm

Sheet B	1	2	3	4	5	6	7	8	9	10	11	Final
Chelsea Brandwood	0	0	2	1	1	0	2	0	0	2	0	8
Hailey Armstrong 🔨	0	1	0	0	0	1	0	5	1	0	1	9

Sheet D	1	2	3	4	5	6	7	8	9	10	Final
Julia Markle 🔨	1	0	0	3	0	2	0	0	1	0	7
Carly Howard	0	1	1	0	1	0	2	1	0	2	8

=== Draw 10 ===
Thursday, January 23, 9:00 am

Sheet A	1	2	3	4	5	6	7	8	9	10	Final
Shelley Hardy 🔨	0	2	1	0	2	0	3	0	3	X	11
Hollie Duncan	1	0	0	1	0	2	0	1	0	X	5

Sheet B	1	2	3	4	5	6	7	8	9	10	Final
Danielle Inglis	1	0	0	0	2	0	2	0	0	1	6
Isabelle Ladouceur 🔨	0	0	2	1	0	1	0	1	0	0	5

=== Draw 12 ===
Thursday, January 23, 7:00 pm

Sheet A	1	2	3	4	5	6	7	8	9	10	Final
Carly Howard 🔨	0	0	0	1	0	0	0	X	X	X	1
Chelsea Brandwood	0	1	1	0	2	2	2	X	X	X	8

Sheet B	1	2	3	4	5	6	7	8	9	10	Final
Breanna Rozon 🔨	0	0	3	1	0	2	0	1	X	X	7
Hollie Duncan	0	0	0	0	1	0	1	0	X	X	2

Sheet C	1	2	3	4	5	6	7	8	9	10	Final
Shelley Hardy	2	0	1	1	0	0	1	1	0	X	6
Danielle Inglis 🔨	0	3	0	0	1	3	0	0	3	X	10

Sheet D	1	2	3	4	5	6	7	8	9	10	Final
Cathy Auld	0	0	2	1	0	1	0	1	0	0	5
Isabelle Ladouceur 🔨	0	1	0	0	2	0	1	0	1	1	6

=== Draw 13 ===
Friday, January 24, 9:00 am

Sheet A	1	2	3	4	5	6	7	8	9	10	Final
Breanna Rozon	0	0	0	0	2	0	1	0	X	X	3
Isabelle Ladouceur 🔨	0	1	2	2	0	1	0	2	X	X	8

Sheet B	1	2	3	4	5	6	7	8	9	10	Final
Danielle Inglis 🔨	1	0	2	0	2	2	0	1	0	X	8
Chelsea Brandwood	0	2	0	1	0	0	1	0	1	X	5

=== Draw 14 ===
Friday, January 24, 2:00 pm

Sheet A	1	2	3	4	5	6	7	8	9	10	Final
Carly Howard 🔨	0	1	1	3	1	0	4	X	X	X	10
Katie Ford	0	0	0	0	0	1	0	X	X	X	1

Sheet D	1	2	3	4	5	6	7	8	9	10	Final
Julia Markle	0	1	2	3	0	2	0	1	0	X	9
Shelley Hardy 🔨	2	0	0	0	2	0	2	0	1	X	7

=== Draw 16 ===
Saturday, January 25, 9:00 am

Sheet C	1	2	3	4	5	6	7	8	9	10	Final
Carly Howard 🔨	0	1	0	2	1	0	2	0	1	0	7
Julia Markle	0	0	1	0	0	2	0	2	0	1	6

Sheet D	1	2	3	4	5	6	7	8	9	10	Final
Chelsea Brandwood 🔨	1	1	0	0	1	0	1	0	1	1	6
Isabelle Ladouceur	0	0	1	1	0	1	0	1	0	0	4

== Playoffs ==
Page playoff system
A	Hailey Armstrong	5
B	Danielle Inglis	9
C1	Carly Howard	7
C2	Chelsea Brandwood	9

Semifinal
A	Hailey Armstrong	3
C2	Chelsea Brandwood	6

Final
B	Danielle Inglis	8
C2	Chelsea Brandwood	4

=== A vs. B ===
Friday, January 24, 7:00 pm

Sheet C	1	2	3	4	5	6	7	8	9	10	Final
Hailey Armstrong 🔨	1	0	1	0	1	0	0	2	X	X	5
Danielle Inglis	0	1	0	3	0	0	5	0	X	X	9

=== C1 vs. C2 ===
Saturday, January 25, 2:00 pm

Sheet B	1	2	3	4	5	6	7	8	9	10	11	Final
Carly Howard	0	0	0	3	0	2	0	1	0	1	0	7
Chelsea Brandwood 🔨	0	1	1	0	1	0	2	0	2	0	2	9

=== Semifinal ===
Saturday, January 25, 7:00 pm

Sheet C	1	2	3	4	5	6	7	8	9	10	Final
Hailey Armstrong 🔨	0	0	1	0	0	1	0	1	0	X	3
Chelsea Brandwood	0	0	0	1	1	0	2	0	2	X	6

=== Final ===
Sunday, January 26, 10:00 am

Sheet B	1	2	3	4	5	6	7	8	9	10	Final
Danielle Inglis 🔨	0	1	2	0	1	1	0	2	1	X	8
Chelsea Brandwood	0	0	0	2	0	0	2	0	0	X	4

2025 Ontario Women's Curling Championship

Danielle Inglis
2nd Ontario Provincial Championship title

== Qualification ==
=== Open Qualifier ===
January 3–5, Oakville Curling Club, Oakville

A1 Side	To STOH
Carly Howard (Milton)	6
Jenny Madden (Ottawa)	5	Jenny Madden	3
Emilie Lovitt (Toronto)	4	Carly Howard	6
Dominique Vivier (Oakville)	7	Dominique Vivier	3
Julia Markle (Navan)	4	Dominique Vivier	7
Caitlin Keon (Richmond Hill)	5	Cathy Auld	1
Cathy Auld (Ottawa)	8

A2 Side	To STOH
Katelin Langford (Peterborough)	5
Heather Heggestad (Barrie)	4	Katelin Langford	5
Emilie Metcalfe (Peterborough)	10	Emilie Metcalfe	7
Amanda Gebhardt (Listowel)	2	Emilie Metcalfe	3
Marteen Jones (Vankleek Hill)	4	Hailey Armstrong	7
Charlotte Johnston (Dundas)	5	Charlotte Johnston	2
Hailey Armstrong (High Park)	10

B1 Side	To STOH
Emilie Metcalfe	1
Cathy Auld	7
Jenny Madden	2
Heather Heggestad	2	Amanda Gebhardt	11
Amanda Gebhardt	8	Amanda Gebhardt	5
Cathy Auld	9
Marteen Jones	5
Cathy Auld	7

B2 Side	To STOH
Dominique Vivier	4
Julia Markle	5
Emilie Lovitt	6
Katelin Langford	7
Katelin Langford	3
Julia Markle	7	Julia Markle	7
Caitlin Keon	4	Julia Markle	9
Charlotte Johnston	3
