= 2024 Stu Sells Toronto Tankard =

- Host city: Toronto & Oakville, Ontario
- Arena: High Park Club & Oakville Curling Club
- Dates: October 10–14
- Men's winner: (Ontario) Team Epping
- Curling club: Northern Credit Union CC, Sudbury
- Skip: John Epping
- Third: Jacob Horgan
- Second: Tanner Horgan
- Lead: Ian McMillan
- Finalist: (South Korea) Jeong Byeong-jin
- Women's winner: (South Korea) Team Kim
- Curling club: Gangneung CC, Gangneung
- Skip: Kim Eun-jung
- Third: Kim Kyeong-ae
- Second: Kim Cho-hi
- Lead: Kim Seon-yeong
- Alternate: Kim Yeong-mi
- Coach: Lim Myung-sup, Peter Gallant
- Finalist: (Switzerland) Silvana Tirinzoni

The 2024 Stu Sells Toronto Tankard was held from October 10 to 14 at the High Park Club in Toronto with select games taking place at the Oakville Curling Club in Oakville, Ontario. The event was held in a triple knockout format with a purse of $42,000 on the men's side and $40,000 on the women's side. It was the second Stu Sells sponsored event held as part of the 2024–25 season.

== Men ==
=== Teams ===
The teams are listed as follows:

Skip	Third	Second	Lead	Alternate	Locale
Tetsuro Shimizu (Fourth)	Shinya Abe (Skip)	Haruto Ouchi	Hayato Sato	Sota Tsuruga	Sapporo, Japan
Félix Asselin	Jean-Michel Ménard	Martin Crête	Jean-François Trépanier		Montreal, Quebec
Jonathan Beuk	Pat Janssen	David Staples	Scott Chadwick		Kingston, Ontario
Trevor Bonot	Mike McCarville	Jordan Potts	Kurtis Byrd		Thunder Bay, Ontario
Carter Bryant	Jacob Dobson	Nolan Bryant	Matthew Abrams		Brantford, Ontario
Alex Champ	Kevin Flewwelling	Sean Harrison	Zander Elmes		Toronto, Ontario
James Craik	Mark Watt	Angus Bryce	Blair Haswell		Forfar, Scotland
John Epping	Jacob Horgan	Tanner Horgan	Ian McMillan		Sudbury, Ontario
Pat Ferris	Connor Duhaime	Kurt Armstrong	Matt Pretty		Grimsby, Ontario
Mike Fournier	Charlie Richard	Émile Asselin	Punit Sthankiya		Toronto, Ontario
Kohsuke Hirata	Shingo Usui	Ryota Meguro	Yoshiya Miura		Kitami, Japan
Daniel Hocevar	Jacob Jones	Joel Matthews	Matthew Duizer		Toronto, Ontario
Philipp Hösli (Fourth)	Marco Hösli (Skip)	Simon Gloor	Justin Hausherr		Glarus, Switzerland
Jeong Byeong-jin	Lee Jeong-jae	Kim Min-woo	Kim Jeong-min		Seoul, South Korea
Mark Kean	Brady Lumley	Matthew Garner	Spencer Dunlop		Woodstock, Ontario
Jayden King	Dylan Niepage	Owen Henry	Daniel Del Conte		London, Ontario
Lukáš Klíma	Marek Černovský	Martin Jurík	Lukáš Klípa	Radek Boháč	Prague, Czech Republic
Takumi Maeda	Asei Nakahara	Hiroki Maeda	Uryu Kamikawa	Ryoji Onodera	Kitami, Japan
Matthew Manuel	Cameron MacKenzie	Jeffrey Meagher	Nick Zachernuk		Halifax, Nova Scotia
Sam Mooibroek	Ryan Wiebe	Scott Mitchell	Nathan Steele		Whitby, Ontario
Yusuke Morozumi	Yuta Matsumura	Ryotaro Shukuya	Masaki Iwai	Kosuke Morozumi	Karuizawa, Japan
Park Jong-duk	Jeong Yeong-seok	Oh Seung-hoon	Lee Ki-bok	Seong Ji-hoon	Gangwon, South Korea
Owen Purcell	Luke Saunders	Adam McEachren (Note: Alternate Adam McEachren played second, replacing Scott Saccary.)	Ryan Abraham		Halifax, Nova Scotia
Magnus Ramsfjell	Martin Sesaker	Bendik Ramsfjell	Gaute Nepstad		Trondheim, Norway
Joël Retornaz	Amos Mosaner	Sebastiano Arman	Mattia Giovanella		Trentino, Italy
Landan Rooney	Evan Lilly	Connor Lawes	Robert Currie		Little Current, Ontario
Greg Smith	Chris Ford	Zach Young	Zack Shurtleff	Carter Small	St. John's, Newfoundland and Labrador
Kim Schwaller	Felix Eberhard	Gavin Lydiate (Note: Gavin Lydiate spared for Yves Stocker. He played second while Felix Eberhard and Kim Schwaller moved up to third and skip respectively.)	Tom Winkelhausen		Zug, Switzerland
Julien Tremblay	Jean-Michel Arsenault	Jesse Mullen	Phillipe Brassard		Quebec City, Quebec
Evan van Amsterdam	Jason Ginter	Sterling Middleton	Parker Konschuh	Darren Moulding	Edmonton, Alberta
Xu Xiaoming	Zou Qiang	Wang Zhiyu	Guan Tianqi	Tian Jiafeng	Beijing, China
Riku Yanagisawa	Tsuyoshi Yamaguchi	Takeru Yamamoto	Satoshi Koizumi		Karuizawa, Japan

=== Knockout Brackets ===
==== A Event ====
First Knockout	Qualifier 1
(Italy) Joël Retornaz	9
(Ontario) Carter Bryant	10	(Ontario) Carter Bryant	1
(Ontario) Mark Kean	5	(Ontario) Alex Champ	7
(Ontario) Alex Champ	8	(Ontario) Alex Champ	8
(Japan) Yusuke Morozumi	6	(Japan) Riku Yanagisawa	4
(Newfoundland and Labrador) Greg Smith	2	(Japan) Yusuke Morozumi	3
(Japan) Riku Yanagisawa	5	(Japan) Riku Yanagisawa	7
(Ontario) Landan Rooney	4	(Ontario) Alex Champ	6
(Ontario) Sam Mooibroek	7	(Japan) Kohsuke Hirata	1
(South Korea) Park Jong-duk	6	(Ontario) Sam Mooibroek	7
(Ontario) Jayden King	5	(Ontario) Jayden King	0
(Quebec) Julien Tremblay	4	(Ontario) Sam Mooibroek	3
(Switzerland) Marco Hösli	3	(Japan) Kohsuke Hirata	8
(Japan) Kohsuke Hirata	4	(Japan) Kohsuke Hirata	9
(Ontario) Pat Ferris	4	(Ontario) Pat Ferris	4
(Ontario) Mike Fournier	3

First Knockout	Qualifier 2
(Scotland) James Craik	6
(China) Xu Xiaoming	3	(Scotland) James Craik	3
(Japan) Takumi Maeda	3	(Czech Republic) Lukáš Klíma	6
(Czech Republic) Lukáš Klíma	7	(Czech Republic) Lukáš Klíma	5
(Nova Scotia) Owen Purcell	9	(Nova Scotia) Owen Purcell	7
(Ontario) Jonathan Beuk	8	(Nova Scotia) Owen Purcell	6
(Quebec) Félix Asselin	6	(Nova Scotia) Matthew Manuel	2
(Nova Scotia) Matthew Manuel	7	(Nova Scotia) Owen Purcell	3
(Switzerland) Team Stocker	6	(Ontario) John Epping	8
(Ontario) Trevor Bonot	5	(Switzerland) Team Stocker	7
(Japan) Shinya Abe	2	(South Korea) Jeong Byeong-jin	3
(South Korea) Jeong Byeong-jin	7	(Switzerland) Team Stocker	6
(Norway) Magnus Ramsfjell	5	(Ontario) John Epping	8
(Ontario) Daniel Hocevar	7	(Ontario) Daniel Hocevar	4
(Ontario) John Epping	7	(Ontario) John Epping	5
(Alberta) Evan van Amsterdam	6

==== B Event ====
Second Knockout	Qualifier 3
(Italy) Joël Retornaz	5
(Ontario) Mark Kean	7	(Ontario) Mark Kean	10
(Newfoundland and Labrador) Greg Smith	7	(Newfoundland and Labrador) Greg Smith	1
(Ontario) Landan Rooney	4	(Ontario) Mark Kean	10
(Czech Republic) Lukáš Klíma	7
(Ontario) Mark Kean	2
(South Korea) Park Jong-duk	2	(Switzerland) Marco Hösli	8
(Quebec) Julien Tremblay	6	(Quebec) Julien Tremblay	3
(Switzerland) Marco Hösli	9	(Switzerland) Marco Hösli	5
(Ontario) Mike Fournier	2	(Switzerland) Marco Hösli	6
(Switzerland) Team Stocker	5
(Switzerland) Marco Hösli	4
(Scotland) James Craik	3
(Scotland) James Craik	5
(Ontario) Daniel Hocevar	2
(Scotland) James Craik	5
(South Korea) Jeong Byeong-jin	2
(Nova Scotia) Matthew Manuel	3
(South Korea) Jeong Byeong-jin	7
(Scotland) James Craik	8
(Japan) Kohsuke Hirata	7

Second Knockout	Qualifier 4
(Ontario) Carter Bryant	1
(Japan) Yusuke Morozumi	9
(Japan) Yusuke Morozumi	4
(Ontario) Jayden King	5
(Ontario) Jayden King	8
(Ontario) Pat Ferris	6
(Ontario) Jayden King	6
(Nova Scotia) Owen Purcell	7
(Nova Scotia) Owen Purcell	2
(Norway) Magnus Ramsfjell	8
(Japan) Riku Yanagisawa	4
(China) Xu Xiaoming	10	(Norway) Magnus Ramsfjell	6
(Japan) Takumi Maeda	0	(China) Xu Xiaoming	5
(Norway) Magnus Ramsfjell	8	(Norway) Magnus Ramsfjell	6
(Alberta) Evan van Amsterdam	3	(Norway) Magnus Ramsfjell	9
(Japan) Shinya Abe	2
(Ontario) Sam Mooibroek	5
(Ontario) Trevor Bonot	3	(Japan) Shinya Abe	6
(Japan) Shinya Abe	6	(Japan) Shinya Abe	8
(Ontario) Jonathan Beuk	3	(Quebec) Félix Asselin	4
(Quebec) Félix Asselin	6

==== C Event ====
Third Knockout	Qualifier 5
(Ontario) Daniel Hocevar	4
(Italy) Joël Retornaz	7	(Italy) Joël Retornaz	5
(Ontario) Landan Rooney	0	(Italy) Joël Retornaz	5
(Nova Scotia) Matthew Manuel	1
(Nova Scotia) Matthew Manuel	7
(South Korea) Park Jong-duk	0	(Ontario) Mike Fournier	2
(Ontario) Mike Fournier	6	(Italy) Joël Retornaz	6
(Scotland) James Craik	5

Third Knockout	Qualifier 6
(Japan) Riku Yanagisawa	4
(Ontario) Sam Mooibroek	5
(Ontario) Sam Mooibroek	9
(Ontario) Mark Kean	2
(Ontario) Sam Mooibroek	1
(South Korea) Jeong Byeong-jin	4
(South Korea) Jeong Byeong-jin	7
(Newfoundland and Labrador) Greg Smith	6	(Newfoundland and Labrador) Greg Smith	2
(Quebec) Julien Tremblay	5	(South Korea) Jeong Byeong-jin	10
(Ontario) Jayden King	5

Third Knockout	Qualifier 7
(Japan) Yusuke Morozumi	3
(China) Xu Xiaoming	6	(Quebec) Félix Asselin	6
(Quebec) Félix Asselin	8	(Quebec) Félix Asselin	7
(Japan) Kohsuke Hirata	6
(Quebec) Félix Asselin	5
(Japan) Shinya Abe	10
(Czech Republic) Lukáš Klíma	9
(Switzerland) Team Stocker	5
(Czech Republic) Lukáš Klíma	0
(Japan) Shinya Abe	7

Third Knockout	Qualifier 8
(Ontario) Carter Bryant	2
(Japan) Takumi Maeda	5	(Japan) Takumi Maeda	8
(Alberta) Evan van Amsterdam	4	(Japan) Takumi Maeda	3
(Ontario) Jonathan Beuk	7
(Ontario) Pat Ferris	3
(Ontario) Trevor Bonot	5	(Ontario) Jonathan Beuk	5
(Ontario) Jonathan Beuk	7	(Ontario) Jonathan Beuk	4
(Nova Scotia) Owen Purcell	3

=== Knockout Results ===
All draw times are listed in Eastern Time (UTC−04:00).
Note: Sheets H 1 through 5 are at the High Park Club. Sheets O 1 through 8 are at the Oakville Curling Club.

==== Draw 1 ====
Thursday, October 10, 7:45 am

Sheet H2	1	2	3	4	5	6	7	8	Final
(Switzerland) Marco Hösli 🔨	0	1	1	0	1	0	0	0	3
(Japan) Kohsuke Hirata	1	0	0	0	0	2	0	1	4

Sheet H3	1	2	3	4	5	6	7	8	Final
(Scotland) James Craik 🔨	1	1	0	0	2	0	2	X	6
(China) Xu Xiaoming	0	0	2	0	0	1	0	X	3

Sheet H4	1	2	3	4	5	6	7	8	Final
(Japan) Takumi Maeda 🔨	0	0	2	0	0	1	X	X	3
(Czech Republic) Lukáš Klíma	1	2	0	1	3	0	X	X	7

Sheet H5	1	2	3	4	5	6	7	8	9	Final
(Norway) Magnus Ramsfjell 🔨	2	0	0	0	0	1	0	2	0	5
(Ontario) Daniel Hocevar	0	0	1	1	1	0	2	0	2	7

==== Draw 2 ====
Thursday, October 10, 10:30 am

Sheet H1	1	2	3	4	5	6	7	8	Final
(Japan) Riku Yanagisawa	1	0	0	1	0	0	2	1	5
(Ontario) Landan Rooney 🔨	0	1	1	0	0	2	0	0	4

Sheet H2	1	2	3	4	5	6	7	8	Final
(Japan) Yusuke Morozumi	0	1	1	0	1	0	3	X	6
(Newfoundland and Labrador) Greg Smith 🔨	0	0	0	1	0	1	0	X	2

Sheet H3	1	2	3	4	5	6	7	8	9	Final
(Ontario) Sam Mooibroek 🔨	4	0	0	1	0	0	1	0	1	7
(South Korea) Park Jong-duk	0	1	1	0	2	1	0	1	0	6

==== Draw 3 ====
Thursday, October 10, 1:30 pm

Sheet H1	1	2	3	4	5	6	7	8	Final
(Ontario) Mark Kean 🔨	3	0	1	0	0	0	1	X	5
(Ontario) Alex Champ	0	1	0	3	2	2	0	X	8

Sheet H3	1	2	3	4	5	6	7	8	Final
(Ontario) Jayden King 🔨	0	0	2	0	0	1	0	2	5
(Quebec) Julien Tremblay	1	0	0	1	1	0	1	0	4

Sheet H5	1	2	3	4	5	6	7	8	9	Final
(Italy) Joël Retornaz	0	1	0	3	0	3	0	2	0	9
(Ontario) Carter Bryant 🔨	4	0	1	0	1	0	3	0	1	10

==== Draw 4 ====
Thursday, October 10, 4:00 pm

Sheet H2	1	2	3	4	5	6	7	8	Final
(Ontario) John Epping 🔨	1	0	2	3	0	1	0	0	7
(Alberta) Evan van Amsterdam	0	2	0	0	1	0	2	1	6

Sheet H3	1	2	3	4	5	6	7	8	Final
(Ontario) Pat Ferris 🔨	1	0	0	2	0	1	0	X	4
(Ontario) Mike Fournier	0	0	1	0	1	0	1	X	3

==== Draw 5 ====
Thursday, October 10, 7:30 pm

Sheet H2	1	2	3	4	5	6	7	8	Final
(Ontario) Sam Mooibroek 🔨	2	1	2	2	X	X	X	X	7
(Ontario) Jayden King	0	0	0	0	X	X	X	X	0

Sheet H4	1	2	3	4	5	6	7	8	Final
(Ontario) Carter Bryant	0	0	1	0	X	X	X	X	1
(Ontario) Alex Champ 🔨	2	2	0	3	X	X	X	X	7

Sheet H5	1	2	3	4	5	6	7	8	Final
(Japan) Yusuke Morozumi	0	0	0	2	1	0	0	X	3
(Japan) Riku Yanagisawa 🔨	2	1	2	0	0	1	1	X	7

==== Draw 6 ====
Thursday, October 10, 10:00 pm

Sheet H4	1	2	3	4	5	6	7	8	Final
(Japan) Kohsuke Hirata 🔨	0	3	0	0	3	1	2	X	9
(Ontario) Pat Ferris	2	0	1	1	0	0	0	X	4

Sheet H5	1	2	3	4	5	6	7	8	Final
(Switzerland) Marco Hösli	0	0	2	0	4	3	X	X	9
(Ontario) Mike Fournier 🔨	1	0	0	1	0	0	X	X	2

==== Draw 7 ====
Friday, October 11, 9:00 am

Sheet H1	1	2	3	4	5	6	7	8	Final
(South Korea) Park Jong-duk	0	0	1	0	1	0	X	X	2
(Quebec) Julien Tremblay 🔨	1	1	0	1	0	3	X	X	6

Sheet O1	1	2	3	4	5	6	7	8	9	Final
(Nova Scotia) Owen Purcell	0	0	3	0	2	0	3	0	1	9
(Ontario) Jonathan Beuk 🔨	1	0	0	1	0	3	0	3	0	8

Sheet O2	1	2	3	4	5	6	7	8	Final
(Quebec) Félix Asselin 🔨	0	2	1	0	0	0	3	0	6
(Nova Scotia) Matthew Manuel	2	0	0	1	1	2	0	1	7

Sheet O3	1	2	3	4	5	6	7	8	Final
(Switzerland) Team Stocker	0	0	2	1	0	2	0	1	6
(Ontario) Trevor Bonot 🔨	0	2	0	0	2	0	1	0	5

Sheet O4	1	2	3	4	5	6	7	8	Final
(Japan) Shinya Abe 🔨	1	0	1	0	0	0	0	X	2
(South Korea) Jeong Byeong-jin	0	2	0	3	1	1	0	X	7

Sheet O5	1	2	3	4	5	6	7	8	Final
(Italy) Joël Retornaz	0	0	2	0	1	0	2	X	5
(Ontario) Mark Kean 🔨	1	0	0	4	0	2	0	X	7

Sheet O6	1	2	3	4	5	6	7	8	Final
(Newfoundland and Labrador) Greg Smith 🔨	2	0	2	2	0	0	1	X	7
(Ontario) Landan Rooney	0	2	0	0	0	2	0	X	4

Sheet O7	1	2	3	4	5	6	7	8	Final
(China) Xu Xiaoming	4	1	4	1	X	X	X	X	10
(Japan) Takumi Maeda 🔨	0	0	0	0	X	X	X	X	0

Sheet O8	1	2	3	4	5	6	7	8	Final
(Norway) Magnus Ramsfjell 🔨	3	0	0	2	0	3	0	X	8
(Alberta) Evan van Amsterdam	0	1	1	0	1	0	0	X	3

==== Draw 8 ====
Friday, October 11, 12:00 pm

Sheet H4	1	2	3	4	5	6	7	8	Final
(Ontario) Daniel Hocevar 🔨	1	0	0	0	1	0	1	1	4
(Ontario) John Epping	0	1	1	1	0	2	0	0	5

Sheet H5	1	2	3	4	5	6	7	8	Final
(Scotland) James Craik 🔨	0	0	1	0	1	1	0	X	3
(Czech Republic) Lukáš Klíma	0	1	0	2	0	0	3	X	6

==== Draw 9 ====
Friday, October 11, 3:15 pm

Sheet H4	1	2	3	4	5	6	7	8	Final
(Nova Scotia) Owen Purcell 🔨	1	0	1	1	0	2	1	X	6
(Nova Scotia) Matthew Manuel	0	0	0	0	2	0	0	X	2

Sheet O1	1	2	3	4	5	6	7	8	Final
(Ontario) Mark Kean 🔨	3	0	3	4	X	X	X	X	10
(Newfoundland and Labrador) Greg Smith	0	1	0	0	X	X	X	X	1

Sheet O2	1	2	3	4	5	6	7	8	Final
(Quebec) Julien Tremblay	0	1	0	1	0	1	0	X	3
(Switzerland) Marco Hösli 🔨	2	0	1	0	1	0	1	X	5

Sheet O3	1	2	3	4	5	6	7	8	Final
(Ontario) Carter Bryant	0	0	1	0	X	X	X	X	1
(Japan) Yusuke Morozumi 🔨	3	2	0	4	X	X	X	X	9

Sheet O4	1	2	3	4	5	6	7	8	9	Final
(Ontario) Jayden King	0	2	1	0	0	2	1	0	2	8
(Ontario) Pat Ferris 🔨	0	0	0	4	1	0	0	1	0	6

Sheet O5	1	2	3	4	5	6	7	8	Final
(China) Xu Xiaoming	0	0	3	0	0	0	1	1	5
(Norway) Magnus Ramsfjell 🔨	2	2	0	0	0	2	0	0	6

Sheet O6	1	2	3	4	5	6	7	8	Final
(Switzerland) Team Stocker 🔨	0	0	4	0	2	0	1	X	7
(South Korea) Jeong Byeong-jin	0	0	0	2	0	1	0	X	3

Sheet O7	1	2	3	4	5	6	7	8	Final
(Ontario) Trevor Bonot	0	0	0	1	0	2	0	X	3
(Japan) Shinya Abe 🔨	0	2	1	0	1	0	2	X	6

Sheet O8	1	2	3	4	5	6	7	8	Final
(Ontario) Jonathan Beuk	0	0	0	1	0	2	0	X	3
(Quebec) Félix Asselin 🔨	3	0	2	0	1	0	0	X	6

==== Draw 10 ====
Friday, October 11, 6:30 pm

Sheet H1	1	2	3	4	5	6	7	8	Final
(Scotland) James Craik 🔨	1	0	2	1	1	0	0	X	5
(Ontario) Daniel Hocevar	0	1	0	0	0	0	1	X	2

Sheet H3	1	2	3	4	5	6	7	8	Final
(Ontario) Alex Champ 🔨	2	0	0	1	1	0	4	X	8
(Japan) Riku Yanagisawa	0	1	1	0	0	2	0	X	4

Sheet H4	1	2	3	4	5	6	7	8	Final
(Italy) Joël Retornaz 🔨	0	2	4	1	X	X	X	X	7
(Ontario) Landan Rooney	0	0	0	0	X	X	X	X	0

Sheet H5	1	2	3	4	5	6	7	8	Final
(Ontario) Sam Mooibroek	0	0	3	0	0	0	X	X	3
(Japan) Kohsuke Hirata 🔨	3	1	0	1	2	1	X	X	8

==== Draw 11 ====
Friday, October 11, 9:30 pm

Sheet H1	1	2	3	4	5	6	7	8	Final
(Switzerland) Team Stocker	1	0	2	0	0	2	0	1	6
(Ontario) John Epping 🔨	0	2	0	1	1	0	4	0	8

Sheet H2	1	2	3	4	5	6	7	8	Final
(Czech Republic) Lukáš Klíma 🔨	0	0	2	0	0	2	1	0	5
(Nova Scotia) Owen Purcell	1	2	0	2	1	0	0	1	7

Sheet H3	1	2	3	4	5	6	7	8	Final
(South Korea) Park Jong-duk	0	0	0	0	0	X	X	X	0
(Ontario) Mike Fournier 🔨	1	1	1	2	1	X	X	X	6

Sheet H4	1	2	3	4	5	6	7	8	Final
(Ontario) Trevor Bonot 🔨	1	0	2	0	1	0	1	0	5
(Ontario) Jonathan Beuk	0	2	0	1	0	2	0	2	7

Sheet H5	1	2	3	4	5	6	7	8	9	Final
(Japan) Takumi Maeda 🔨	0	2	0	0	1	1	0	0	1	5
(Alberta) Evan van Amsterdam	0	0	1	1	0	0	1	1	0	4

==== Draw 12 ====
Saturday, October 12, 9:00 am

Sheet H1	1	2	3	4	5	6	7	8	Final
(Ontario) Mark Kean 🔨	0	2	0	2	0	2	1	3	10
(Czech Republic) Lukáš Klíma	3	0	2	0	2	0	0	0	7

Sheet H3	1	2	3	4	5	6	7	8	Final
(Switzerland) Marco Hösli 🔨	2	0	2	0	0	2	0	0	6
(Switzerland) Team Stocker	0	1	0	2	1	0	1	0	5

Sheet O3	1	2	3	4	5	6	7	8	Final
(Nova Scotia) Matthew Manuel 🔨	0	1	1	0	0	1	0	X	3
(South Korea) Jeong Byeong-jin	1	0	0	3	1	0	2	X	7

Sheet O6	1	2	3	4	5	6	7	8	Final
(Japan) Shinya Abe 🔨	2	1	0	2	1	0	2	X	8
(Quebec) Félix Asselin	0	0	3	0	0	1	0	X	4

==== Draw 13 ====
Saturday, October 12, 12:00 pm

Sheet H1	1	2	3	4	5	6	7	8	Final
(Ontario) Carter Bryant 🔨	1	0	0	1	0	X	X	X	2
(Japan) Takumi Maeda	0	3	3	0	2	X	X	X	8

Sheet H2	1	2	3	4	5	6	7	8	Final
(Ontario) Alex Champ 🔨	2	0	0	1	1	1	1	X	6
(Japan) Kohsuke Hirata	0	1	0	0	0	0	0	X	1

Sheet H5	1	2	3	4	5	6	7	8	9	Final
(Newfoundland and Labrador) Greg Smith 🔨	1	0	1	1	0	2	0	0	1	6
(Quebec) Julien Tremblay	0	1	0	0	2	0	0	2	0	5

==== Draw 14 ====
Saturday, October 12, 3:15 pm

Sheet H1	1	2	3	4	5	6	7	8	Final
(Nova Scotia) Matthew Manuel 🔨	1	0	0	3	1	2	X	X	7
(Ontario) Mike Fournier	0	1	1	0	0	0	X	X	2

Sheet H2	1	2	3	4	5	6	7	8	Final
(Nova Scotia) Owen Purcell 🔨	0	0	0	1	0	2	0	X	3
(Ontario) John Epping	2	0	1	0	3	0	2	X	8

Sheet H3	1	2	3	4	5	6	7	8	Final
(Ontario) Daniel Hocevar	0	0	3	0	0	1	0	X	4
(Italy) Joël Retornaz 🔨	1	1	0	3	0	0	0	X	5

Sheet H4	1	2	3	4	5	6	7	8	Final
(China) Xu Xiaoming 🔨	2	0	1	0	2	0	0	1	6
(Quebec) Félix Asselin	0	2	0	1	0	4	1	0	8

Sheet H5	1	2	3	4	5	6	7	8	Final
(Ontario) Pat Ferris	0	0	1	0	0	0	2	0	3
(Ontario) Jonathan Beuk 🔨	1	1	0	0	0	2	0	1	5

Sheet O1	1	2	3	4	5	6	7	8	Final
(Scotland) James Craik	0	1	0	0	1	1	0	2	5
(South Korea) Jeong Byeong-jin 🔨	1	0	0	1	0	0	0	0	2

Sheet O2	1	2	3	4	5	6	7	8	Final
(Ontario) Sam Mooibroek	0	2	1	0	1	1	0	0	5
(Japan) Shinya Abe 🔨	1	0	0	1	0	0	1	3	6

Sheet O5	1	2	3	4	5	6	7	8	Final
(Japan) Yusuke Morozumi 🔨	1	1	1	0	0	1	0	0	4
(Ontario) Jayden King	0	0	0	2	0	0	1	2	5

Sheet O7	1	2	3	4	5	6	7	8	Final
(Japan) Riku Yanagisawa 🔨	0	0	1	0	1	0	1	1	4
(Norway) Magnus Ramsfjell	2	1	0	2	0	1	0	0	6

Sheet O8	1	2	3	4	5	6	7	8	Final
(Ontario) Mark Kean	0	1	0	0	1	0	X	X	2
(Switzerland) Marco Hösli 🔨	0	0	2	1	0	5	X	X	8

==== Draw 15 ====
Saturday, October 12, 6:30 pm

Sheet H5	1	2	3	4	5	6	7	8	Final
(Czech Republic) Lukáš Klíma	0	5	0	0	2	0	2	X	9
(Switzerland) Team Stocker 🔨	1	0	1	1	0	2	0	X	5

==== Draw 16 ====
Saturday, October 12, 9:30 pm

Sheet H1	1	2	3	4	5	6	7	8	9	Final
(Japan) Riku Yanagisawa	0	0	1	0	2	0	0	1	0	4
(Ontario) Sam Mooibroek 🔨	0	2	0	1	0	1	0	0	1	5

Sheet H3	1	2	3	4	5	6	7	8	Final
(Scotland) James Craik 🔨	1	0	2	0	2	0	2	1	8
(Japan) Kohsuke Hirata	0	3	0	2	0	2	0	0	7

Sheet H4	1	2	3	4	5	6	7	8	Final
(South Korea) Jeong Byeong-jin 🔨	0	2	1	0	4	X	X	X	7
(Newfoundland and Labrador) Greg Smith	1	0	0	1	0	X	X	X	2

Sheet H5	1	2	3	4	5	6	7	8	9	Final
(Ontario) Jayden King 🔨	0	2	2	2	0	0	0	0	0	6
(Nova Scotia) Owen Purcell	2	0	0	0	2	0	1	1	1	7

==== Draw 17 ====
Sunday, October 13, 8:30 am

Sheet H1	1	2	3	4	5	6	7	8	Final
(Japan) Yusuke Morozumi 🔨	0	1	0	0	1	0	1	X	3
(Quebec) Félix Asselin	1	0	1	2	0	2	0	X	6

Sheet H4	1	2	3	4	5	6	7	8	Final
(Norway) Magnus Ramsfjell 🔨	2	1	0	0	6	X	X	X	9
(Japan) Shinya Abe	0	0	1	1	0	X	X	X	2

==== Draw 18 ====
Sunday, October 13, 11:30 am

Sheet H2	1	2	3	4	5	6	7	8	9	Final
(Switzerland) Marco Hösli 🔨	0	1	0	0	0	1	1	0	1	4
(Scotland) James Craik	0	0	1	1	0	0	0	1	0	3

Sheet H3	1	2	3	4	5	6	7	8	Final
(South Korea) Jeong Byeong-jin	0	1	0	4	0	5	X	X	10
(Ontario) Jayden King 🔨	1	0	2	0	2	0	X	X	5

Sheet H5	1	2	3	4	5	6	7	8	Final
(Ontario) Sam Mooibroek 🔨	2	0	1	0	2	4	X	X	9
(Ontario) Mark Kean	0	1	0	1	0	0	X	X	2

==== Draw 19 ====
Sunday, October 13, 2:30 pm

Sheet H1	1	2	3	4	5	6	7	8	Final
(Czech Republic) Lukáš Klíma	0	0	0	0	X	X	X	X	0
(Japan) Shinya Abe 🔨	2	2	1	2	X	X	X	X	7

Sheet H2	1	2	3	4	5	6	7	8	Final
(Nova Scotia) Owen Purcell	0	1	0	0	1	0	X	X	2
(Norway) Magnus Ramsfjell 🔨	2	0	0	3	0	3	X	X	8

Sheet H3	1	2	3	4	5	6	7	8	Final
(Japan) Takumi Maeda	0	0	2	0	1	0	0	X	3
(Ontario) Jonathan Beuk 🔨	0	2	0	3	0	1	1	X	7

Sheet H4	1	2	3	4	5	6	7	8	Final
(Italy) Joël Retornaz 🔨	2	0	2	0	1	0	0	X	5
(Nova Scotia) Matthew Manuel	0	1	0	0	0	0	0	X	1

Sheet H5	1	2	3	4	5	6	7	8	Final
(Quebec) Félix Asselin 🔨	1	1	0	0	2	0	1	2	7
(Japan) Kohsuke Hirata	0	0	3	2	0	1	0	0	6

==== Draw 20 ====
Sunday, October 13, 5:30 pm

Sheet H2	1	2	3	4	5	6	7	8	Final
(Ontario) Sam Mooibroek	0	0	0	0	1	0	0	X	1
(South Korea) Jeong Byeong-jin 🔨	0	1	0	1	0	1	1	X	4

==== Draw 21 ====
Sunday, October 13, 9:30 pm

Sheet H1	1	2	3	4	5	6	7	8	Final
(Ontario) Jonathan Beuk 🔨	0	0	1	0	0	2	0	1	4
(Nova Scotia) Owen Purcell	0	0	0	1	0	0	2	0	3

Sheet H2	1	2	3	4	5	6	7	8	9	Final
(Italy) Joël Retornaz 🔨	0	0	2	0	2	0	1	0	1	6
(Scotland) James Craik	1	0	0	1	0	2	0	1	0	5

Sheet H3	1	2	3	4	5	6	7	8	Final
(Quebec) Félix Asselin	0	0	1	2	0	2	0	0	5
(Japan) Shinya Abe 🔨	4	1	0	0	2	0	1	2	10

=== Playoffs ===
Quarterfinals
A2	(Ontario) John Epping	7
C4	(Ontario) Jonathan Beuk	3
B2	(Norway) Magnus Ramsfjell	6
C1	(Italy) Joël Retornaz	2
A1	(Ontario) Alex Champ	5
C2	(South Korea) Jeong Byeong-jin	7
B1	(Switzerland) Marco Hösli	8
C3	(Japan) Shinya Abe	0

Semifinals
A2	(Ontario) John Epping	9
B2	(Norway) Magnus Ramsfjell	3
C2	(South Korea) Jeong Byeong-jin	8
B1	(Switzerland) Marco Hösli	2

Final
A2	(Ontario) John Epping	8
C2	(South Korea) Jeong Byeong-jin	4

==== Quarterfinals ====
Monday, October 14, 8:00 am

Sheet H3	1	2	3	4	5	6	7	8	Final
(Ontario) Alex Champ 🔨	3	1	0	0	0	0	1	0	5
(South Korea) Jeong Byeong-jin	0	0	1	1	3	1	0	1	7

Monday, October 14, 11:00 am

Sheet H1	1	2	3	4	5	6	7	8	Final
(Switzerland) Marco Hösli 🔨	3	4	1	X	X	X	X	X	8
(Japan) Shinya Abe	0	0	0	X	X	X	X	X	0

Sheet H2	1	2	3	4	5	6	7	8	Final
(Ontario) John Epping 🔨	0	0	2	0	2	0	2	1	7
(Ontario) Jonathan Beuk	0	0	0	1	0	2	0	0	3

Sheet H5	1	2	3	4	5	6	7	8	Final
(Norway) Magnus Ramsfjell 🔨	1	0	1	1	1	0	2	X	6
(Italy) Joël Retornaz	0	0	0	0	0	2	0	X	2

==== Semifinals ====
Monday, October 14, 2:00 pm

Sheet H3	1	2	3	4	5	6	7	8	Final
(Ontario) John Epping 🔨	3	0	1	2	0	0	3	X	9
(Norway) Magnus Ramsfjell	0	1	0	0	2	0	0	X	3

Sheet H4	1	2	3	4	5	6	7	8	Final
(South Korea) Jeong Byeong-jin	0	0	4	0	0	4	X	X	8
(Switzerland) Marco Hösli 🔨	0	1	0	0	1	0	X	X	2

==== Final ====
Monday, October 14, 5:00 pm

Sheet H2	1	2	3	4	5	6	7	8	Final
(Ontario) John Epping 🔨	1	0	4	0	3	0	X	X	8
(South Korea) Jeong Byeong-jin	0	2	0	1	0	1	X	X	4

== Women ==
=== Teams ===
The teams are listed as follows:

Skip	Third	Second	Lead	Alternate	Locale
Hailey Armstrong	Grace Holyoke	Evelyn Robert	Alice Holyoke		Toronto, Ontario
Emma Artichuk	Megan Smith	Jamie Smith	– (Note: Team Artichuk played with thee players.)		Sudbury, Ontario
Chelsea Brandwood	Lauren Horton	Brenda Chapman	Keira McLaughlin		Niagara Falls, Ontario
Krysta Burns	Jestyn Murphy	Sara Guy	Laura Masters		Sudbury, Ontario
Jessica Corrado	Kristina Brauch	Kaitlin Jewer	Jessica Byers	Karen Rowsell	Lakefield, Ontario
Hollie Duncan	Megan Balsdon	Julie Tippin (Note: Alternate Julie Tippin played second, replacing Rachelle Strybosch.)	Kelly Middaugh (Note: Kelly Middaugh spared for Tess Guyatt.)		Woodstock, Ontario
Madeleine Dupont	Mathilde Halse	Denise Dupont	My Larsen	Jasmin Holtermann	Hvidovre, Denmark
Raunora Westcott (Fourth)	Jen Gates	Amanda Gates	Kerry Galusha (Skip)		(Northwest Territories) Yellowknife / Sudbury / Winnipeg
Shelley Hardy	Stephanie Mumford	Abby Deschene	Stephanie Corrado		Sarnia, Ontario
Anna Hasselborg	Sara McManus	Agnes Knochenhauer	Sofia Mabergs		Sundbyberg, Sweden
Carly Howard	Katelyn Wasylkiw	Lynn Kreviazuk	Laura Hickey		Toronto, Ontario
Danielle Inglis	Kira Brunton	Calissa Daly	Cassandra de Groot	Kim Tuck	Ottawa, Ontario
Kim Eun-jung	Kim Kyeong-ae	Kim Cho-hi	Kim Seon-yeong	Kim Yeong-mi	Gangneung, South Korea
Ikue Kitazawa	Seina Nakajima	Ami Enami	Minori Suzuki	Hasumi Ishigooka	Nagano, Japan
Isabelle Ladouceur	Grace Lloyd	Michaela Robert	Rachel Steele		Whitby, Ontario
Kayla MacMillan	Sarah Daniels	Lindsay Dubue	Sarah Loken		Victoria, British Columbia
Lauren Mann	Laura Forget	Candice Jackson	Stephanie Barbeau		North Bay, Ontario
Julia Markle	Paige Bown	– (Note: Team Markle played with three players.)	Emma Rebel		Navan, Ontario
Krista McCarville	Andrea Kelly	Kendra Lilly	Sarah Potts		Thunder Bay, Ontario
Breanna Rozon	Chrissy Cadorin	Stephanie Thompson	Jillian Page	Leigh Armstrong	Oshawa, Ontario
Xenia Schwaller	Selina Gafner	Fabienne Rieder	Selina Rychiger		Zurich, Switzerland
Laurie St-Georges	Jamie Sinclair	Emily Riley	Lisa Weagle		Montreal, Quebec
Alina Pätz (Fourth)	Silvana Tirinzoni (Skip)	Carole Howald (Note: Carole Howald and Selina Witschonke switched positions for the event.)	Selina Witschonke		Aarau, Switzerland
Isabella Wranå	Almida de Val	Maria Larsson	Linda Stenlund		Sundbyberg, Sweden

=== Knockout Brackets ===
==== A Event ====
First Knockout				Qualifier 1
(Switzerland) Silvana Tirinzoni	5
(Northwest Territories) Kerry Galusha	3	(Switzerland) Silvana Tirinzoni	8
(Quebec) Laurie St-Georges	3	(Ontario) Carly Howard	3
(Ontario) Carly Howard	9			(Switzerland) Silvana Tirinzoni	9
(Japan) Ikue Kitazawa	5			(Ontario) Hailey Armstrong	1
(Ontario) Hailey Armstrong	7	(Ontario) Hailey Armstrong	7
(Ontario) Danielle Inglis	2	(Ontario) Chelsea Brandwood	3
(Ontario) Chelsea Brandwood	7

First Knockout				Qualifier 2
(Sweden) Anna Hasselborg	8
(Ontario) Jessica Corrado	1	(Sweden) Anna Hasselborg	4
(Ontario) Isabelle Ladouceur	4	(Ontario) Emma Artichuk	6
(Ontario) Emma Artichuk	6			(Ontario) Emma Artichuk	6
(Switzerland) Xenia Schwaller	5			(Switzerland) Xenia Schwaller	4
(Denmark) Madeleine Dupont	4	(Switzerland) Xenia Schwaller	9
(Ontario) Shelley Hardy	6	(Ontario) Shelley Hardy	3
(Ontario) Krysta Burns	4

First Knockout				Qualifier 3
(South Korea) Kim Eun-jung	6
(Ontario) Breanna Rozon	3	(South Korea) Kim Eun-jung	8
(Ontario) Krista McCarville	6	(Ontario) Krista McCarville	0
(Ontario) Hollie Duncan	4			(South Korea) Kim Eun-jung	6
(Sweden) Isabella Wranå	7			(Sweden) Isabella Wranå	3
(Ontario) Julia Markle	6	(Sweden) Isabella Wranå	8
(British Columbia) Kayla MacMillan	4	(Ontario) Lauren Mann	1
(Ontario) Lauren Mann	8

==== B Event ====
Second Knockout	Qualifier 4
(Ontario) Krista McCarville	5
(Northwest Territories) Kerry Galusha	5	(Quebec) Laurie St-Georges	3
(Quebec) Laurie St-Georges	7	(Ontario) Krista McCarville	5
(Japan) Ikue Kitazawa	7
(Ontario) Lauren Mann	2
(Japan) Ikue Kitazawa	6	(Japan) Ikue Kitazawa	10
(Ontario) Danielle Inglis	4	(Japan) Ikue Kitazawa	6
(Switzerland) Xenia Schwaller	7

Second Knockout	Qualifier 5
(Ontario) Carly Howard	3
(Ontario) Jessica Corrado	5	(Ontario) Jessica Corrado	2
(Ontario) Isabelle Ladouceur	4	(Ontario) Carly Howard	3
(Denmark) Madeleine Dupont	8
(Ontario) Chelsea Brandwood	5
(Denmark) Madeleine Dupont	9	(Denmark) Madeleine Dupont	10
(Ontario) Krysta Burns	2	(Denmark) Madeleine Dupont	2
(Sweden) Isabella Wranå	10

Second Knockout	Qualifier 6
(Sweden) Anna Hasselborg	7
(Ontario) Breanna Rozon	1	(Ontario) Hollie Duncan	4
(Ontario) Hollie Duncan	9	(Sweden) Anna Hasselborg	4
(Ontario) Shelley Hardy	1
(Ontario) Shelley Hardy	5
(Ontario) Julia Markle	9	(Ontario) Julia Markle	4
(British Columbia) Kayla MacMillan	2	(Sweden) Anna Hasselborg	6
(Ontario) Hailey Armstrong	4

==== C Event ====
Third Knockout	Qualifier 7
(Quebec) Laurie St-Georges	9
(Ontario) Lauren Mann	6
(Quebec) Laurie St-Georges	7
(Ontario) Jessica Corrado	4	(Ontario) Shelley Hardy	6
(Ontario) Chelsea Brandwood	7	(Ontario) Chelsea Brandwood	4
(Ontario) Shelley Hardy	5
(Quebec) Laurie St-Georges	4
(Ontario) Krista McCarville	7
(Ontario) Krista McCarville	9
(Ontario) Hollie Duncan	4	(Ontario) Julia Markle	1
(Ontario) Julia Markle	7	(Ontario) Krista McCarville	W
(Denmark) Madeleine Dupont	L

Third Knockout	Qualifier 8
(Ontario) Hailey Armstrong	9
(Northwest Territories) Kerry Galusha	4	(Ontario) Carly Howard	0
(Ontario) Danielle Inglis	5	(Ontario) Danielle Inglis	5
(Ontario) Carly Howard	7
(Ontario) Hailey Armstrong	7
(Ontario) Krysta Burns	8
(Japan) Ikue Kitazawa	5
(Ontario) Isabelle Ladouceur	3	(Ontario) Krysta Burns	6
(Ontario) Krysta Burns	7	(Ontario) Krysta Burns	5
(Ontario) Breanna Rozon	4	(British Columbia) Kayla MacMillan	1
(British Columbia) Kayla MacMillan	9

=== Knockout Results ===
All draw times are listed in Eastern Time (UTC−04:00).
Note: Sheets H 1 through 5 are at the High Park Club. Sheets O 1 through 8 are at the Oakville Curling Club.

==== Draw 1 ====
Thursday, October 10, 7:45 am

Sheet H1	1	2	3	4	5	6	7	8	Final
(Switzerland) Xenia Schwaller	1	0	0	1	0	0	1	2	5
(Denmark) Madeleine Dupont 🔨	0	1	0	0	2	1	0	0	4

==== Draw 2 ====
Thursday, October 10, 10:30 am

Sheet H4	1	2	3	4	5	6	7	8	Final
(Switzerland) Silvana Tirinzoni	0	2	0	0	0	2	1	X	5
(Northwest Territories) Kerry Galusha 🔨	1	0	0	0	2	0	0	X	3

Sheet H5	1	2	3	4	5	6	7	8	Final
(Quebec) Laurie St-Georges	0	1	0	2	0	0	X	X	3
(Ontario) Carly Howard 🔨	2	0	3	0	1	3	X	X	9

==== Draw 3 ====
Thursday, October 10, 1:30 pm

Sheet H2	1	2	3	4	5	6	7	8	Final
(Japan) Ikue Kitazawa 🔨	0	2	0	2	0	0	0	1	5
(Ontario) Hailey Armstrong	1	0	2	0	2	1	1	0	7

Sheet H4	1	2	3	4	5	6	7	8	Final
(Ontario) Danielle Inglis	0	0	1	0	0	1	X	X	2
(Ontario) Chelsea Brandwood 🔨	2	1	0	2	2	0	X	X	7

==== Draw 4 ====
Thursday, October 10, 4:00 pm

Sheet H1	1	2	3	4	5	6	7	8	Final
(Ontario) Shelley Hardy	0	0	0	3	0	2	1	X	6
(Ontario) Krysta Burns 🔨	0	1	2	0	1	0	0	X	4

Sheet H4	1	2	3	4	5	6	7	8	Final
(British Columbia) Kayla MacMillan 🔨	0	1	0	1	0	2	0	0	4
(Ontario) Lauren Mann	2	0	2	0	1	0	1	2	8

Sheet H5	1	2	3	4	5	6	7	8	Final
(Sweden) Isabella Wranå 🔨	1	0	4	0	0	2	0	X	7
(Ontario) Julia Markle	0	2	0	1	1	0	2	X	6

==== Draw 5 ====
Thursday, October 10, 7:30 pm

Sheet H1	1	2	3	4	5	6	7	8	Final
(Northwest Territories) Kerry Galusha	0	1	0	0	0	2	2	0	5
(Quebec) Laurie St-Georges 🔨	0	0	0	3	3	0	0	1	7

Sheet H3	1	2	3	4	5	6	7	8	Final
(Switzerland) Silvana Tirinzoni	0	0	3	0	3	2	X	X	8
(Ontario) Carly Howard 🔨	1	1	0	1	0	0	X	X	3

==== Draw 6 ====
Thursday, October 10, 10:00 pm

Sheet H1	1	2	3	4	5	6	7	8	Final
(Japan) Ikue Kitazawa	1	0	2	1	0	0	1	1	6
(Ontario) Danielle Inglis 🔨	0	2	0	0	1	1	0	0	4

Sheet H2	1	2	3	4	5	6	7	8	Final
(Denmark) Madeleine Dupont	0	2	5	0	2	X	X	X	9
(Ontario) Krysta Burns 🔨	1	0	0	1	0	X	X	X	2

Sheet H3	1	2	3	4	5	6	7	8	Final
(Ontario) Julia Markle 🔨	2	2	0	5	X	X	X	X	9
(British Columbia) Kayla MacMillan	0	0	2	0	X	X	X	X	2

==== Draw 7 ====
Friday, October 11, 9:00 am

Sheet H2	1	2	3	4	5	6	7	8	Final
(Ontario) Krista McCarville 🔨	2	0	1	0	1	0	0	2	6
(Ontario) Hollie Duncan	0	2	0	1	0	1	0	0	4

Sheet H3	1	2	3	4	5	6	7	8	Final
(Sweden) Anna Hasselborg 🔨	0	0	2	0	4	2	X	X	8
(Ontario) Jessica Corrado	0	0	0	1	0	0	X	X	1

Sheet H4	1	2	3	4	5	6	7	8	Final
(South Korea) Kim Eun-jung 🔨	0	2	0	0	3	0	0	1	6
(Ontario) Breanna Rozon	0	0	0	1	0	1	1	0	3

Sheet H5	1	2	3	4	5	6	7	8	Final
(Ontario) Isabelle Ladouceur 🔨	0	3	0	0	0	1	0	0	4
(Ontario) Emma Artichuk	1	0	1	1	1	0	1	1	6

==== Draw 8 ====
Friday, October 11, 12:00 pm

Sheet H1	1	2	3	4	5	6	7	8	Final
(Ontario) Hailey Armstrong 🔨	2	0	3	0	1	0	1	X	7
(Ontario) Chelsea Brandwood	0	2	0	1	0	0	0	X	3

Sheet H2	1	2	3	4	5	6	7	8	Final
(Switzerland) Xenia Schwaller 🔨	2	1	0	3	0	0	3	X	9
(Ontario) Shelley Hardy	0	0	1	0	1	1	0	X	3

Sheet H3	1	2	3	4	5	6	7	8	Final
(Sweden) Isabella Wranå 🔨	3	0	0	2	1	2	X	X	8
(Ontario) Lauren Mann	0	1	0	0	0	0	X	X	1

==== Draw 9 ====
Friday, October 11, 3:15 pm

Sheet H1	1	2	3	4	5	6	7	8	9	Final
(Ontario) Jessica Corrado	0	1	1	1	0	1	0	0	1	5
(Ontario) Isabelle Ladouceur 🔨	1	0	0	0	1	0	1	1	0	4

Sheet H2	1	2	3	4	5	6	7	8	9	Final
(Sweden) Anna Hasselborg	0	0	0	2	0	1	1	0	0	4
(Ontario) Emma Artichuk 🔨	0	1	0	0	2	0	0	1	2	6

Sheet H3	1	2	3	4	5	6	7	8	Final
(South Korea) Kim Eun-jung 🔨	2	1	1	2	2	X	X	X	8
(Ontario) Krista McCarville	0	0	0	0	0	X	X	X	0

Sheet H5	1	2	3	4	5	6	7	8	Final
(Ontario) Breanna Rozon	0	0	1	0	0	0	X	X	1
(Ontario) Hollie Duncan 🔨	2	1	0	2	1	3	X	X	9

==== Draw 10 ====
Friday, October 11, 6:30 pm

Sheet H2	1	2	3	4	5	6	7	8	Final
(Switzerland) Silvana Tirinzoni 🔨	3	3	0	3	X	X	X	X	9
(Ontario) Hailey Armstrong	0	0	1	0	X	X	X	X	1

==== Draw 12 ====
Saturday, October 12, 9:00 am

Sheet H2	1	2	3	4	5	6	7	8	Final
(South Korea) Kim Eun-jung 🔨	1	0	0	2	0	1	2	X	6
(Sweden) Isabella Wranå	0	2	0	0	1	0	0	X	3

Sheet H4	1	2	3	4	5	6	7	8	Final
(Ontario) Emma Artichuk 🔨	0	1	0	2	0	0	1	2	6
(Switzerland) Xenia Schwaller	2	0	1	0	0	1	0	0	4

Sheet H5	1	2	3	4	5	6	7	8	Final
(Northwest Territories) Kerry Galusha	0	1	0	0	0	2	1	0	4
(Ontario) Danielle Inglis 🔨	2	0	0	1	1	0	0	1	5

Sheet O1	1	2	3	4	5	6	7	8	9	Final
(Ontario) Shelley Hardy 🔨	1	1	0	1	0	0	1	0	1	5
(Ontario) Julia Markle	0	0	1	0	1	1	0	1	0	4

Sheet O2	1	2	3	4	5	6	7	8	Final
(Ontario) Chelsea Brandwood	2	0	3	0	0	0	X	X	5
(Denmark) Madeleine Dupont 🔨	0	2	0	2	4	2	X	X	10

Sheet O4	1	2	3	4	5	6	7	8	Final
(Sweden) Anna Hasselborg 🔨	0	0	2	1	0	2	0	2	7
(Ontario) Hollie Duncan	1	0	0	0	2	0	1	0	4

Sheet O5	1	2	3	4	5	6	7	8	Final
(Ontario) Krista McCarville	0	1	0	0	2	1	0	1	5
(Quebec) Laurie St-Georges 🔨	1	0	1	0	0	0	1	0	3

Sheet O7	1	2	3	4	5	6	7	8	Final
(Ontario) Lauren Mann	0	0	1	0	1	0	0	X	2
(Japan) Ikue Kitazawa 🔨	1	1	0	1	0	4	3	X	10

Sheet O8	1	2	3	4	5	6	7	8	Final
(Ontario) Carly Howard 🔨	0	0	0	0	1	1	1	0	3
(Ontario) Jessica Corrado	0	0	0	1	0	0	0	1	2

==== Draw 13 ====
Saturday, October 12, 12:00 pm

Sheet H3	1	2	3	4	5	6	7	8	Final
(Ontario) Isabelle Ladouceur 🔨	0	2	0	1	0	0	0	0	3
(Ontario) Krysta Burns	1	0	1	0	1	1	1	2	7

Sheet H4	1	2	3	4	5	6	7	8	Final
(Ontario) Breanna Rozon 🔨	0	1	0	2	0	1	0	X	4
(British Columbia) Kayla MacMillan	1	0	3	0	2	0	3	X	9

==== Draw 14 ====
Saturday, October 12, 3:15 pm

Sheet O3	1	2	3	4	5	6	7	8	Final
(Sweden) Anna Hasselborg 🔨	1	1	0	0	0	1	1	X	4
(Ontario) Shelley Hardy	0	0	1	0	0	0	0	X	1

Sheet O4	1	2	3	4	5	6	7	8	Final
(Ontario) Carly Howard	0	1	0	2	0	0	0	X	3
(Denmark) Madeleine Dupont 🔨	2	0	2	0	1	2	1	X	8

Sheet O6	1	2	3	4	5	6	7	8	Final
(Ontario) Krista McCarville	0	3	0	1	0	0	0	1	5
(Japan) Ikue Kitazawa 🔨	2	0	1	0	0	1	3	0	7

==== Draw 15 ====
Saturday, October 12, 6:30 pm

Sheet H1	1	2	3	4	5	6	7	8	Final
(Ontario) Krysta Burns	0	1	0	1	1	1	1	X	5
(British Columbia) Kayla MacMillan 🔨	1	0	0	0	0	0	0	X	1

Sheet H2	1	2	3	4	5	6	7	8	Final
(Ontario) Hollie Duncan	0	0	1	1	0	2	0	X	4
(Ontario) Julia Markle 🔨	1	2	0	0	2	0	2	X	7

Sheet H3	1	2	3	4	5	6	7	8	Final
(Ontario) Jessica Corrado	1	0	1	0	2	0	0	X	4
(Ontario) Chelsea Brandwood 🔨	0	3	0	1	0	3	0	X	7

Sheet H4	1	2	3	4	5	6	7	8	Final
(Quebec) Laurie St-Georges	0	4	0	2	0	0	1	2	9
(Ontario) Lauren Mann 🔨	2	0	2	0	1	1	0	0	6

==== Draw 16 ====
Saturday, October 12, 9:30 pm

Sheet H2	1	2	3	4	5	6	7	8	Final
(Sweden) Anna Hasselborg	2	0	0	0	2	0	1	1	6
(Ontario) Hailey Armstrong 🔨	0	2	1	1	0	0	0	0	4

==== Draw 17 ====
Sunday, October 13, 8:30 am

Sheet H2	1	2	3	4	5	6	7	8	9	Final
(Japan) Ikue Kitazawa 🔨	0	1	0	1	0	1	0	3	0	6
(Switzerland) Xenia Schwaller	1	0	2	0	2	0	1	0	1	7

Sheet H3	1	2	3	4	5	6	7	8	Final
(Denmark) Madeleine Dupont	0	0	1	1	0	0	X	X	2
(Sweden) Isabella Wranå 🔨	0	3	0	0	2	5	X	X	10

Sheet H5	1	2	3	4	5	6	7	8	Final
(Ontario) Krista McCarville 🔨	1	1	0	5	2	X	X	X	9
(Ontario) Julia Markle	0	0	1	0	0	X	X	X	1

==== Draw 18 ====
Sunday, October 13, 11:30 am

Sheet H1	1	2	3	4	5	6	7	8	Final
(Ontario) Chelsea Brandwood 🔨	1	0	1	0	1	1	0	0	4
(Ontario) Shelley Hardy	0	2	0	1	0	0	0	2	5

Sheet H4	1	2	3	4	5	6	7	8	Final
(Ontario) Danielle Inglis	0	0	0	3	0	1	1	0	5
(Ontario) Carly Howard 🔨	0	0	2	0	2	0	0	3	7

==== Draw 20 ====
Sunday, October 13, 5:30 pm

Sheet H1	1	2	3	4	5	6	7	8	Final
(Ontario) Hailey Armstrong 🔨	3	4	2	X	X	X	X	X	9
(Ontario) Carly Howard	0	0	0	X	X	X	X	X	0

Sheet H3	1	2	3	4	5	6	7	8	9	Final
(Quebec) Laurie St-Georges 🔨	1	0	3	0	1	0	1	0	1	7
(Ontario) Shelley Hardy	0	1	0	2	0	1	0	2	0	6

Sheet H4	1	2	3	4	5	6	7	8	Final
(Japan) Ikue Kitazawa	0	2	0	3	0	0	0	0	5
(Ontario) Krysta Burns 🔨	1	0	1	0	1	2	0	1	6

Sheet H5	Final
(Ontario) Krista McCarville 🔨	W
(Denmark) Madeleine Dupont	L

==== Draw 21 ====
Sunday, October 13, 9:30 pm

Sheet H4	1	2	3	4	5	6	7	8	Final
(Quebec) Laurie St-Georges 🔨	2	0	1	0	0	0	1	0	4
(Ontario) Krista McCarville	0	2	0	3	0	1	0	1	7

Sheet H5	1	2	3	4	5	6	7	8	Final
(Ontario) Hailey Armstrong 🔨	0	2	0	1	3	0	0	1	7
(Ontario) Krysta Burns	1	0	1	0	0	3	3	0	8

=== Playoffs ===
Quarterfinals
A1	(Switzerland) Silvana Tirinzoni	12
C2	(Ontario) Krysta Burns	1
B3	(Sweden) Anna Hasselborg	4
B2	(Sweden) Isabella Wranå	5
A3	(South Korea) Kim Eun-jung	8
C1	(Ontario) Krista McCarville	1
A2	(Ontario) Emma Artichuk	6
B1	(Switzerland) Xenia Schwaller	7

Semifinals
A1	(Switzerland) Silvana Tirinzoni	7
B2	(Sweden) Isabella Wranå	4
A3	(South Korea) Kim Eun-jung	5
B1	(Switzerland) Xenia Schwaller	4

Final
A1	(Switzerland) Silvana Tirinzoni	3
A3	(South Korea) Kim Eun-jung	7

==== Quarterfinals ====
Monday, October 14, 8:00 am

Sheet H1	1	2	3	4	5	6	7	8	Final
(Switzerland) Silvana Tirinzoni 🔨	0	4	5	3	X	X	X	X	12
(Ontario) Krysta Burns	1	0	0	0	X	X	X	X	1

Sheet H2	1	2	3	4	5	6	7	8	Final
(South Korea) Kim Eun-jung 🔨	0	2	0	5	1	X	X	X	8
(Ontario) Krista McCarville	0	0	1	0	0	X	X	X	1

Sheet H4	1	2	3	4	5	6	7	8	Final
(Sweden) Anna Hasselborg 🔨	1	0	0	3	0	0	0	0	4
(Sweden) Isabella Wranå	0	1	0	0	0	2	1	1	5

Sheet H5	1	2	3	4	5	6	7	8	Final
(Ontario) Emma Artichuk 🔨	0	2	0	0	2	0	2	0	6
(Switzerland) Xenia Schwaller	2	0	1	2	0	1	0	1	7

==== Semifinals ====
Monday, October 14, 11:00 am

Sheet H3	1	2	3	4	5	6	7	8	Final
(Switzerland) Silvana Tirinzoni 🔨	1	0	0	3	0	3	0	X	7
(Sweden) Isabella Wranå	0	0	1	0	2	0	1	X	4

Sheet H4	1	2	3	4	5	6	7	8	Final
(South Korea) Kim Eun-jung 🔨	0	0	1	1	0	2	0	1	5
(Switzerland) Xenia Schwaller	1	0	0	0	2	0	1	0	4

==== Final ====
Monday, October 14, 2:00 pm

Sheet H2	1	2	3	4	5	6	7	8	Final
(Switzerland) Silvana Tirinzoni	0	0	0	2	0	1	X	X	3
(South Korea) Kim Eun-jung 🔨	1	1	2	0	3	0	X	X	7
