= Hailey Armstrong =

Canadian curler (born 1996)

- Curler
- Born: March 8, 1996 (age 30); Ottawa, Ontario

Team
- Skip: Hailey Armstrong
- Third: Melissa Gannon
- Second: Andréanne Janelle
- Lead: Sarah Throop
- Alternate: Pamela Nugent
- Mixed doubles partner: Billy Woods

Curling career
- Member Association: Ontario (2013–2019; 2022–2026); Quebec (2019–2022; 2026–present)
- Hearts: 3 (2021, 2022, 2026)
- Top CTRS ranking: 11th (2025–26)

Hailey Breyanne Armstrong (born March 8, 1996) is a Canadian curler from Carleton Place, Ontario. She currently skips her own team out of Quebec.

== Career ==
=== Juniors ===
After winning the 2017 Ontario Junior Curling Championships, Armstrong competed in her lone Canadian Junior Curling Championships of her junior career at the 2017 Canadian Junior Curling Championships. She represented Ontario with teammates Grace Holyoke at third, Lindsay Dubue at second and Marcia Richardson at lead. They finished the round robin and championship pools with an unblemished 10–0 record, qualifying directly for the final where they faced Alberta's Kristen Streifel. Tied 3–3 with hammer in the tenth end, Armstrong was heavy on her final draw, giving Alberta a steal of two and the 5–3 win.

=== Women's ===
==== Team St-Georges (2019–2022) ====
Armstrong would move to Quebec and joined the Laurie St-Georges rink as their third. In their first season together, Team St-Georges competed in their first Grand Slam of Curling event at the 2019 Tour Challenge Tier 2 where they lost in a tiebreaker to Megan Balsdon. They also competed in their first provincial women's championship at the 2020 Quebec Scotties Tournament of Hearts. After finishing the round robin in first place, they lost in the final to Noémie Verreault 3–1.

Due to the COVID-19 pandemic in Quebec, the 2021 Quebec Scotties Tournament of Hearts was cancelled. Since the defending champions, Team Noémie Verreault, had disbanded, Team St-Georges (the 2020 provincial runner-up) was invited to represent Quebec at the 2021 Scotties Tournament of Hearts, which they accepted. The event was played in a bio-secure bubble in Calgary, Alberta to prevent the spread of the virus. At the Hearts, Armstrong and her teammates received a lot of media attention and fans thanks to their positive attitudes and strong play on the ice. They also defeated multiple higher ranked teams in the tournament including the Wild Card team of Tracy Fleury (skipped by Chelsea Carey), Corryn Brown's British Columbia rink and Suzanne Birt's team out of Prince Edward Island. Ultimately, they finished the event with a 6–6 record and a seventh place finish.

Team St-Georges began the 2021–22 season with a semifinal finish at the 2021 Oakville Fall Classic where they lost to the event winners Team Jamie Sinclair. They only made the playoffs at one other tour event at the Stu Sells 1824 Halifax Classic, losing in the quarterfinals to Team Jill Brothers. Due to the COVID-19 pandemic in Canada, the qualification process for the 2021 Canadian Olympic Curling Trials had to be modified to qualify enough teams for the championship. In these modifications, Curling Canada created the 2021 Canadian Curling Pre-Trials Direct-Entry Event, an event where eight teams would compete to try to earn one of two spots into the 2021 Canadian Olympic Curling Pre-Trials. Team St-Georges qualified for the Pre-Trials Direct-Entry Event as the second seed. The team won their opening match, but then lost three straight games and were eliminated from the event. The Quebec Scotties Tournament of Hearts was again cancelled due to the pandemic and Team St-Georges were once again selected to represent Quebec at the national women's championship. The team could not replicate their successful run from 2021, finishing the 2022 Scotties Tournament of Hearts with a 3–5 record. They won their opening two matches against Alberta's Laura Walker and the Yukon's Hailey Birnie and their last game against Nova Scotia's Christina Black.

==== Return to Ontario (2022–Present) ====
At the beginning of the 2022–23 curling season, Armstrong returned to Ontario to skip a new team out of Niagara Falls CC. Armstrong's team qualified for the 2024 Ontario Scotties Tournament of Hearts, where she finished with a 3-3 record. Armstrong joined a new team for the 2024-25 curling season out of the High Park Club, and qualified for the 2025 Ontario Scotties Tournament of Hearts. The team would perform well, finishing third, losing to Chelsea Brandwood 6-3 in the semifinals.

Armstrong would again skip a new team for the 2025-26 curling season, now curling out of the Whitby Curling Club alongside Grace Lloyd, Michaela Robert, Rachel Steele, and Lori Eddy. Armstrong would win her first provincial women's championship that season at the 2026 Ontario Women's Curling Championship, beating Danielle Inglis 10–3 in the final, qualifying the team to represent Ontario as the host team at the 2026 Scotties Tournament of Hearts that was held in Mississauga, Ontario. They would finish with a 5–3 record, just missing the playoffs. Following the end of the season, Team Armstrong would announce that they would be disbanding, with Armstrong returning to Quebec to skip a new team.

== Personal life ==
Armstrong began curling at age 9. She grew up in Perth, and at the time of the 2017 Canadian Juniors, she was living in Innisville, Ontario. Armstrong studied business administration at Algonquin College, and studied commerce at Nipissing University. She currently works as a finance manager for Breeze Powerports Financing and a server at Joe's Italian Kitchen.

== Teams ==
Season	Skip	Third	Second	Lead	Alternate
2013–14	Hailey Armstrong	Grace Holyoke	Lindsay Dubue	Marcia Richardson	
2014–15	Hailey Armstrong	Grace Holyoke	Lindsay Dubue	Marcia Richardson	
2016–17	Hailey Armstrong	Grace Holyoke	Lindsay Dubue	Marcia Richardson	
2017–18	Hailey Armstrong	Erica Hopson	Lynsey Longfield	Emma Malfara	
2018–19	Hailey Armstrong	Melissa Gannon	Rebecca Wichers-Schreur	Jessica Armstrong	
2019–20	Laurie St-Georges	Hailey Armstrong	Emily Riley	Cynthia St-Georges	Isabelle Thiboutot
2020–21	Laurie St-Georges	Hailey Armstrong	Emily Riley	Cynthia St-Georges	Florence Boivin
2021–22	Laurie St-Georges	Hailey Armstrong	Emily Riley	Cynthia St-Georges	Isabelle Thiboutot
2022–23	Hailey Armstrong	Megan Smith	Jessica Humphries	Terri Weeks	
2023–24	Hailey Armstrong	Jessica Humphries	Michaela Robert	Terri Weeks	Grace Cave
2024–25	Hailey Armstrong	Grace Holyoke	Evelyn Robert	Alice Holyoke	
2025–26	Hailey Armstrong	Grace Lloyd	Michaela Robert	Rachel Steele	Lori Eddy
2026–27	Hailey Armstrong	Melissa Gannon	Andréanne Janelle	Sarah Throop	Pamela Nugent
