= 2026 Ontario Women's Curling Championship =

Canadian provincial women's curling championship

2026 Farm & Food Care Ontario Women's Curling Championship
- Host city: Elmira, Ontario
- Arena: Woolwich Memorial Centre
- Dates: January 4–11
- Winner: Team Armstrong
- Curling club: Whitby CC, Whitby
- Skip: Hailey Armstrong
- Third: Grace Lloyd
- Second: Michaela Robert
- Lead: Rachel Steele
- Alternate: Lori Eddy
- Coach: Stephen Robert
- Finalist: Danielle Inglis

The 2026 Farm & Food Care Ontario Women's Curling Championship, the provincial women's curling championship for Southern Ontario, was held from January 4 to 11 at Woolwich Memorial Centre in Elmira, Ontario. The winning Hailey Armstrong rink represented Ontario at the 2026 Scotties Tournament of Hearts, Canada's national women's curling championship in Mississauga, Ontario as the host team. Despite the event being held in an Olympic year, it was still held in conjunction with the 2026 Ontario Tankard, the provincial men's curling championship.

== Qualification process ==
Twelve teams qualified for the 2026 Ontario Women's Championship. The top eight southern Ontario teams on the Canada Team Ranking System (CTRS) as of December 1, 2025 qualified, as well as four teams from an open qualifier.

The number one ranked team in Canada according to the CTRS, Rachel Homan will represent Team Canada at the 2026 Winter Olympics after winning the 2025 Canadian Olympic Curling Trials. Homan's rink would have represented Team Canada at the 2026 Scotties as they won the 2025 Scotties Tournament of Hearts and would have bypassed provincials. However, due to qualifying for the Olympics, they will not be competing at the 2026 Scotties.

Qualification method	Berths	Qualifying team(s)
CTRS standings	8	Hollie Duncan; Chelsea Principi; Emma Artichuk; Hailey Armstrong; Danielle Inglis; Carly Howard; Breanna Rozon; Katie Ford
Open Qualifier	4	Cathy Auld; Jenny Madden; Julia Markle; Amanda Gebhardt

== Teams ==
The teams are listed as follows:

Skip	Third	Second	Lead	Alternate	Coach	Club
Hailey Armstrong	Grace Lloyd	Michaela Robert	Rachel Steele	Lori Eddy	Stephen Robert	Whitby CC, Whitby
Emma Artichuk	Jamie Smith	Evelyn Robert	Lauren Rajala		Sean Turriff	KW Granite Club, Waterloo
Cathy Auld	Erin Morrissey	Erica Hopson	Kim Cooper			Ottawa CC, Ottawa
Hollie Duncan	Megan Balsdon	Rachelle Strybosch	Tess Guyatt		Sherry Middaugh	Woodstock CC, Woodstock
Katie Ford	Emily Middaugh	Madison Fisher	Kelly Middaugh		Wayne Middaugh	KW Granite Club, Waterloo
Amanda Gebhardt	Allison Singh	Erin Cook	Hilary Huddleston	Michelle Butler	Dennis Nuhn	Listowel CC, Listowel
Carly Howard	Grace Holyoke	Stephanie Mumford	Alice Holyoke	Stephanie Matheson		High Park Club, Toronto
Danielle Inglis	Kira Brunton	Calissa Daly	Cassandra de Groot		Kim Tuck	Ottawa H&GC, Ottawa
Jenny Madden	Bridget Whynot	Emily Parkinson	Jessica Guilbault	Savannah Byers	Paul Madden	RCMP CC, Ottawa
Julia Markle	Scotia Maltman	Sadie McCutcheon	Jessica Filipcic	Tori Zemmelink	Jodi McCutcheon	High Park Club, Toronto
Chelsea Principi	Lauren Peskett	Brenda Chapman	Keira McLaughlin		John Gabel	Niagara Falls CC, Niagara Falls
Breanna Rozon	Chrissy Cadorin	Stephanie Thompson	Jillian Page	Leigh Armstrong		Thornhill G&CC, Thornhill

=== Map of teams ===
Ontario Women's Curling Championship Teams

== Knockout Brackets ==
=== A Event ===
First Knockout	Qualifier 1
Hollie Duncan	5
Katie Ford	5	Katie Ford	8
Jenny Madden	4	Katie Ford	5
Danielle Inglis	4
Hailey Armstrong	4
Danielle Inglis	9	Danielle Inglis	7
Amanda Gebhardt	4	Katie Ford	7
Chelsea Principi	8
Chelsea Principi	8
Carly Howard	0	Cathy Auld	5
Cathy Auld	10	Chelsea Principi	7
Emma Artichuk	5
Emma Artichuk	9
Breanna Rozon	6	Julia Markle	3
Julia Markle	9

=== B Event ===
Second Knockout	Qualifier 2
Jenny Madden	3
Hailey Armstrong	9	Hailey Armstrong	6
Emma Artichuk	5
Hailey Armstrong	5
Breanna Rozon	6	Danielle Inglis	6
Cathy Auld	7	Cathy Auld	7
Danielle Inglis	8
Danielle Inglis	8
Carly Howard	8	Carly Howard	7
Julia Markle	5	Carly Howard	10
Amanda Gebhardt	3	Hollie Duncan	4
Hollie Duncan	10	Carly Howard	7
Katie Ford	5

=== C Event ===
Third Knockout				Qualifier 3
		Katie Ford	4
Jenny Madden	5	Breanna Rozon	8
Breanna Rozon	6			Breanna Rozon	3
				Hailey Armstrong	4
		Hollie Duncan	5
		Hailey Armstrong	6

Third Knockout	Qualifier 4
Julia Markle	7
Carly Howard	12
Emma Artichuk	6
Julia Markle	8	Julia Markle	5
Cathy Auld	6
Amanda Gebhardt	3
Cathy Auld	10

== Knockout Results ==
All draws are listed in Eastern Time (UTC−05:00).

=== Draw 1 ===
Sunday, January 4, 7:00 pm

Sheet A	1	2	3	4	5	6	7	8	9	10	Final
Danielle Inglis 🔨	0	0	1	0	3	2	3	0	X	X	9
Amanda Gebhardt	0	1	0	2	0	0	0	1	X	X	4

Sheet B	1	2	3	4	5	6	7	8	9	10	Final
Carly Howard	0	0	0	0	X	X	X	X	X	X	0
Cathy Auld 🔨	2	3	2	3	X	X	X	X	X	X	10

Sheet C	1	2	3	4	5	6	7	8	9	10	Final
Breanna Rozon	1	0	0	0	0	3	0	0	2	0	6
Julia Markle 🔨	0	0	1	2	1	0	1	2	0	2	9

Sheet D	1	2	3	4	5	6	7	8	9	10	Final
Katie Ford	0	0	0	0	0	1	0	3	0	1	5
Jenny Madden 🔨	0	0	1	0	1	0	1	0	1	0	4

=== Draw 3 ===
Monday, January 5, 7:30 pm

Sheet A	1	2	3	4	5	6	7	8	9	10	Final
Chelsea Principi 🔨	1	0	0	2	4	0	0	1	0	X	8
Cathy Auld	0	1	0	0	0	1	1	0	2	X	5

Sheet B	1	2	3	4	5	6	7	8	9	10	Final
Emma Artichuk 🔨	0	3	0	1	0	2	0	2	1	X	9
Julia Markle	0	0	1	0	2	0	0	0	0	X	3

Sheet C	1	2	3	4	5	6	7	8	9	10	Final
Hollie Duncan	0	0	0	1	1	1	0	0	2	0	5
Katie Ford 🔨	1	1	2	0	0	0	0	2	0	2	8

Sheet D	1	2	3	4	5	6	7	8	9	10	Final
Hailey Armstrong 🔨	0	0	0	2	0	1	1	0	0	0	4
Danielle Inglis	0	1	1	0	2	0	0	1	0	2	7

=== Draw 5 ===
Tuesday, January 6, 2:00 pm

Sheet A	1	2	3	4	5	6	7	8	9	10	Final
Jenny Madden	0	0	1	1	0	1	0	0	0	X	3
Hailey Armstrong 🔨	0	2	0	0	2	0	2	1	2	X	9

Sheet B	1	2	3	4	5	6	7	8	9	10	Final
Breanna Rozon	1	0	3	0	0	1	0	0	1	0	6
Cathy Auld 🔨	0	1	0	1	1	0	2	1	0	1	7

Sheet C	1	2	3	4	5	6	7	8	9	10	Final
Carly Howard 🔨	0	1	0	2	0	0	0	4	0	1	8
Julia Markle	0	0	1	0	1	2	0	0	1	0	5

Sheet D	1	2	3	4	5	6	7	8	9	10	Final
Amanda Gebhardt	0	0	0	1	0	2	0	0	X	X	3
Hollie Duncan 🔨	1	2	1	0	2	0	2	2	X	X	10

=== Draw 7 ===
Wednesday, January 7, 9:00 am

Sheet A	1	2	3	4	5	6	7	8	9	10	Final
Carly Howard 🔨	2	0	2	0	2	0	3	1	X	X	10
Hollie Duncan	0	2	0	1	0	1	0	0	X	X	4

Sheet C	1	2	3	4	5	6	7	8	9	10	Final
Jenny Madden	0	1	0	0	1	0	1	0	2	0	5
Breanna Rozon 🔨	2	0	1	0	0	1	0	1	0	1	6

=== Draw 8 ===
Wednesday, January 7, 2:00 pm

Sheet B	1	2	3	4	5	6	7	8	9	10	Final
Katie Ford	0	1	0	0	0	0	0	2	1	1	5
Danielle Inglis 🔨	1	0	0	0	0	0	3	0	0	0	4

Sheet D	1	2	3	4	5	6	7	8	9	10	Final
Chelsea Principi 🔨	0	2	2	0	0	1	0	1	0	1	7
Emma Artichuk	0	0	0	3	1	0	1	0	0	0	5

=== Draw 9 ===
Wednesday, January 7, 7:00 pm

Sheet C	1	2	3	4	5	6	7	8	9	10	Final
Hailey Armstrong 🔨	0	0	2	0	1	0	1	1	0	1	6
Emma Artichuk	0	0	0	2	0	2	0	0	1	0	5

Sheet D	1	2	3	4	5	6	7	8	9	10	Final
Cathy Auld	0	0	2	0	1	0	3	0	1	0	7
Danielle Inglis 🔨	0	3	0	1	0	2	0	1	0	1	8

=== Draw 10 ===
Thursday, January 8, 9:00 am

Sheet A	1	2	3	4	5	6	7	8	9	10	Final
Julia Markle	0	0	1	2	0	1	0	2	0	1	7
Emma Artichuk 🔨	0	2	0	0	1	0	2	0	1	0	6

Sheet C	1	2	3	4	5	6	7	8	9	10	Final
Amanda Gebhardt	2	0	0	1	0	0	0	X	X	X	3
Cathy Auld 🔨	0	3	3	0	1	2	1	X	X	X	10

=== Draw 11 ===
Thursday, January 8, 2:00 pm

Sheet C	1	2	3	4	5	6	7	8	9	10	11	Final
Katie Ford	0	0	3	0	0	1	0	0	2	1	0	7
Chelsea Principi 🔨	2	1	0	2	0	0	2	0	0	0	1	8

Sheet D	1	2	3	4	5	6	7	8	9	10	Final
Julia Markle	0	1	0	2	0	0	2	0	1	2	8
Cathy Auld 🔨	1	0	2	0	0	3	0	0	0	0	6

=== Draw 12 ===
Thursday, January 8, 7:00 pm

Sheet B	1	2	3	4	5	6	7	8	9	10	Final
Hailey Armstrong 🔨	2	0	1	0	1	1	0	0	0	0	5
Danielle Inglis	0	1	0	3	0	0	0	1	0	1	6

Sheet D	1	2	3	4	5	6	7	8	9	10	Final
Carly Howard	0	0	0	1	0	1	1	3	0	1	7
Katie Ford 🔨	0	0	2	0	1	0	0	0	2	0	5

=== Draw 13 ===
Friday, January 9, 9:00 am

Sheet B	1	2	3	4	5	6	7	8	9	10	Final
Katie Ford	0	0	0	1	0	0	2	0	1	0	4
Breanna Rozon 🔨	2	0	1	0	0	2	0	2	0	1	8

Sheet C	1	2	3	4	5	6	7	8	9	10	Final
Hollie Duncan	0	0	3	0	0	0	1	1	0	0	5
Hailey Armstrong 🔨	1	1	0	1	0	1	0	0	1	1	6

=== Draw 14 ===
Friday, January 9, 2:00 pm

Sheet C	1	2	3	4	5	6	7	8	9	10	Final
Danielle Inglis	0	1	0	2	0	1	0	2	0	2	8
Carly Howard 🔨	0	0	3	0	1	0	0	0	3	0	7

=== Draw 15 ===
Friday, January 9, 7:00 pm

Sheet A	1	2	3	4	5	6	7	8	9	10	Final
Carly Howard 🔨	3	2	0	3	3	0	1	X	X	X	12
Julia Markle	0	0	1	0	0	4	0	X	X	X	5

Sheet B	1	2	3	4	5	6	7	8	9	10	Final
Breanna Rozon	0	0	0	0	0	2	0	0	1	0	3
Hailey Armstrong 🔨	0	0	0	2	0	0	0	1	0	1	4

== Playoffs ==
Page playoff system
A	Chelsea Principi	3
B	Danielle Inglis	8
C1	Hailey Armstrong	7
C2	Carly Howard	4

Semifinal
A	Chelsea Principi	7
C1	Hailey Armstrong	8

Final
B	Danielle Inglis	3
C1	Hailey Armstrong	10

=== A vs. B ===
Saturday, January 10, 2:00 pm

Sheet B	1	2	3	4	5	6	7	8	9	10	Final
Chelsea Principi 🔨	1	0	0	0	1	0	0	1	X	X	3
Danielle Inglis	0	1	1	1	0	3	2	0	X	X	8

=== C1 vs. C2 ===
Saturday, January 10, 9:00 am

Sheet C	1	2	3	4	5	6	7	8	9	10	Final
Hailey Armstrong 🔨	0	0	3	0	2	0	1	0	0	1	7
Carly Howard	0	0	0	1	0	1	0	2	0	0	4

=== Semifinal ===
Saturday, January 10, 7:00 pm

Sheet C	1	2	3	4	5	6	7	8	9	10	11	Final
Chelsea Principi 🔨	1	0	0	0	2	0	1	0	1	2	0	7
Hailey Armstrong	0	1	1	1	0	2	0	2	0	0	1	8

=== Final ===
Sunday, January 11, 10:00 am

Sheet B	1	2	3	4	5	6	7	8	9	10	Final
Danielle Inglis 🔨	1	0	0	0	0	1	1	0	X	X	3
Hailey Armstrong	0	1	0	2	5	0	0	2	X	X	10

2026 Ontario Women's Curling Championship

Hailey Armstrong
1st Ontario Provincial Championship title

== Qualification ==
=== Open Qualifier ===
December 13–14, RCMP Curling Club, Ottawa

A Side	To Provincials
Jenny Madden (RCMP)	7
Katelin Langford (Uxbridge)	1
Jenny Madden (RCMP)	7
Amanda Gebhardt (Listowel)	2
Julia Markle (High Park)	6
Amanda Gebhardt (Listowel)	7
Jessica Corrado (Russell)	5
Brooklyn Ideson	4
Jaimee Gardner (North Grenville)	3
Brooklyn Ideson	5
Jessica Corrado	2
Cathy Auld (Ottawa)	4
Emilie Lovitt (Navan)	2
Cathy Auld (Ottawa)	11

B Side	To Provincials
Jessica Corrado	4
Jaimee Gardner (North Grevnille)	6	Julia Markle (High Park)	7
Katelin Langford	2	Julia Markle (High Park)	7
Julia Markle (High Park)	8
Amanda Gebhardt (Listowel)	7
Brooklyn Ideson	8	Brooklyn Ideson	6
Emilie Lovitt	5
