= Innisville =

- Unincorporated community
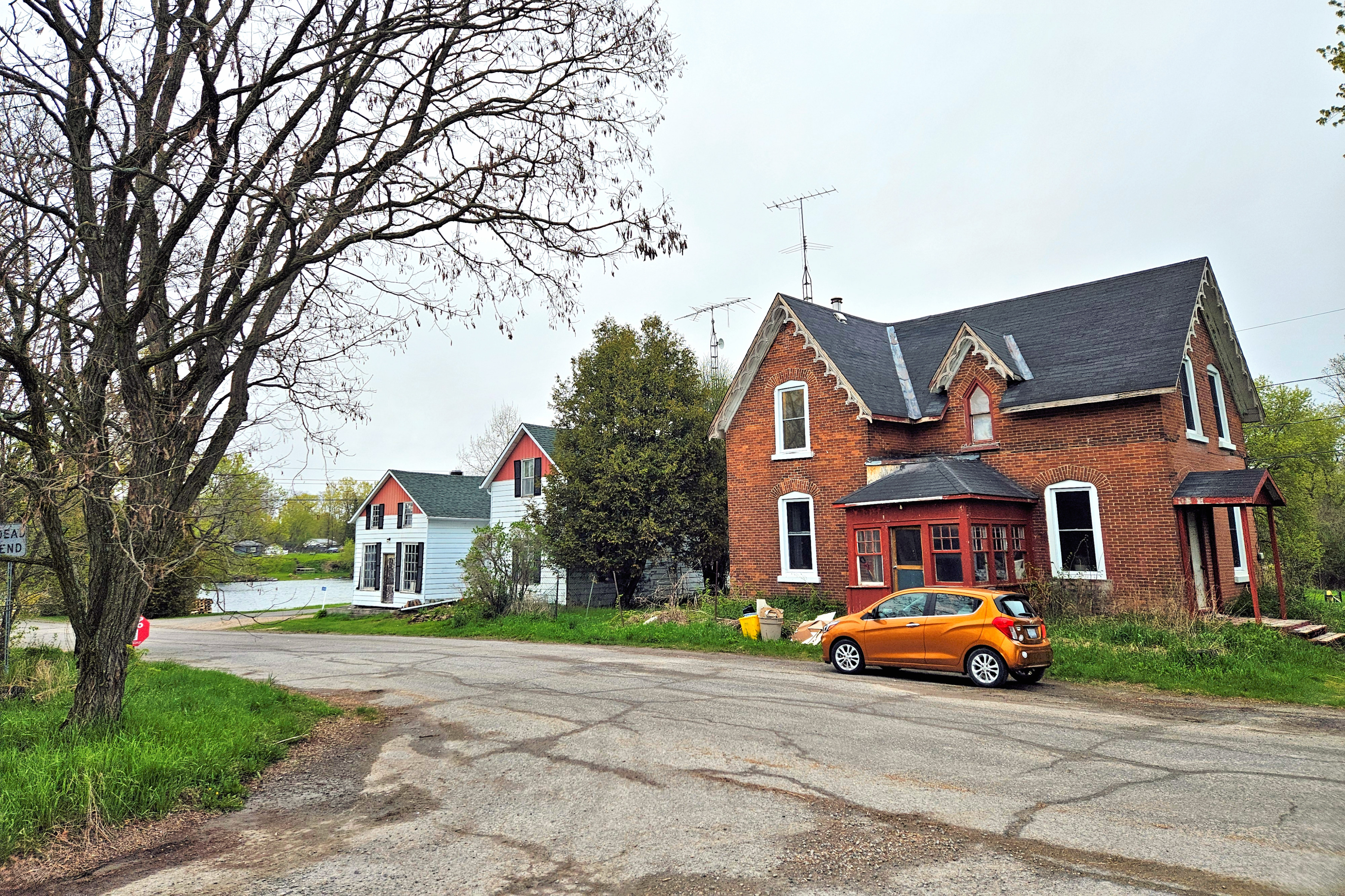

- Location within Southern Ontario
- Coordinates: 45°3′13″N 76°14′57″W
- Country: Canada
- Province: Ontario
- County: Lanark
- Municipality: Drummond/North Elmsley
- Settled: 1810s

Government
  - Fed. riding: Lanark—Frontenac
  - Prov. riding: Lanark—Frontenac—Kingston
- Time zone: UTC-5 (EST)
  - Summer (DST): UTC-4 (EDT)
- Postal code: K7C 4K9
- Area codes: 613

Innisville is a small village between the towns of Perth and Carleton Place, in Ontario, Canada, along Highway 7 or the Trans-Canada Highway. It lies about 18 kilometres (11 mi) east of Perth, on the Mississippi River. The village is separated by the Mississippi River (via Mississippi Lake) into Innisville South and Innisville North.

== History ==
Innisville was settled in the mid-to-late 1810s. The North side was settled first. The village grew around mills using the falls on the Mississippi. Other industries, as well as stores, were attracted to the area. The original name was Freer Falls, later changed to Ennisville and finally Innisville. A bridge was later built over the river.
