= Lori Eddy =

Canadian curler

- Curler
- Born: August 26, 1971 (age 55); Lunenburg, Nova Scotia

Team
- Curling club: Dundas Valley G&CC; Dundas, ON
- Skip: Hailey Armstrong
- Third: Grace Lloyd
- Second: Michaela Robert
- Lead: Rachel Steele
- Alternate: Lori Eddy

Curling career
- Member Association: Ontario (1997–2019; 2021–present); Nunavut (2019–2021)
- Hearts: 4 (1997, 2020, 2021, 2026)
Medal record
Women's curling
Representing Ontario
Canadian Olympic Curling Trials
Silver medal – second place	2013 Winnipeg
Scott Tournament of Hearts
Silver medal – second place	1997 Vancouver

Lori Christine Eddy (born August 26, 1971, in Lunenburg, Nova Scotia) is a Canadian curler from Dundas, Ontario.

== Career ==
=== Women's ===
Eddy played third on the Alison Goring rink that represented Ontario at the 1997 Scott Tournament of Hearts, Canada's national women's curling championship. The team made it to the finals of the event, where they lost to Saskatchewan's Sandra Schmirler. Later that year, the team played in the 1997 Canadian Olympic Curling Trials, but finished tied for eighth place. Over the next few years, Eddy would play for a number of different skips in Ontario including Janet Brown (later McGhee), Marilyn Bodogh, Jacqueline Harrison, Allison Flaxey, Cathy Auld and Julie Hastings. Eddy attended the 2013 Canadian Olympic Curling Trials as an alternate for team Sherry Middaugh. She was also an alternate for Middaugh at the 2014 Canada Cup of Curling. On the World Curling Tour, she won the 2005 Shorty Jenkins Classic playing for McGhee.

Eddy returned to the Hearts 23 years after her silver medal finish in 1997, skipping Team Nunavut. Despite living in Ontario, Eddy was added to the team as the territory's "import player", after being asked by her friend, Alison Griffin who also plays second for Nunavut. The team automatically qualified for the Scotties as no other team in the Territory decided to challenge them. Eddy led Nunavut to a 2–5 record, including a surprise win against Northern Ontario's Krista McCarville. Team Eddy represented Nunavut again the following year at the 2021 Scotties Tournament of Hearts, where they finished with a winless 0–8 record.

Eddy would join the new Team Hailey Armstrong rink as their alternate 2025-26 curling season, now curling out of the Whitby Curling Club alongside Grace Lloyd, Michaela Robert, and Rachel Steele. Team Armstrong would win the Ontario provincial women's championship that season at the 2026 Ontario Women's Curling Championship, beating Danielle Inglis 10-3 in the final, qualifying the team to represent Ontario as the host team at the 2026 Scotties Tournament of Hearts that was held in Mississauga, Ontario.

=== Mixed ===
Eddy won the Ontario Mixed Championship in 2022 playing third for Scott McDonald, and represent Ontario at the 2023 Canadian Mixed Curling Championship. There, Team McDonald would finish the round robin with a 7–3 record, qualifying for the playoffs. After losing in the semifinals to Manitoba, they would rebound and win a bronze medal, beating Nova Scotia's Paul Flemming 8–3 in the bronze medal game.

== Personal life ==
Eddy co-hosts the podcast "2 Girls and a Game" with former teammate Mary Chilvers. She is married and has one daughter.
