= Rick Rowsell Classic =

Annual curling tournament in St. John's, Newfoundland and Labrador

- Established: 2020
- Host city: St. John's, Newfoundland and Labrador
- Arena: St. John's Curling Club
- Men's purse: $7,000
- Women's purse: $4,000

Current champions (2025)
- Men: (Newfoundland and Labrador) Simon Perry
- Women: (Newfoundland and Labrador) Cailey Locke

The Rick Rowsell Classic is an annual curling tournament, held in the fall at the St. John's Curling Club in St. John's, Newfoundland and Labrador. It has been part of the men's and women's tour cycle since the 2021–22 season and was held as a combined event in 2020. The total purse for the men's event is CAD $15,000 while the total purse for the women's event is $5,500.

The event is named in honour of Rick Rowsell, a curler from Newfoundland and Labrador that passed away from brain cancer in 2020. He represented the province at The Brier in three separate decades: 1996, 2000 and 2019. In addition to the creation of the event, the Rick Rowsell Legacy Fund was created. A portion of the team entry fees is donated to the Memorial University of Newfoundland faculty of medicine to support brain cancer research.

Previously known as the Centennial Spiel, the event was renamed the Rick Rowsell Classic in 2020 following Rowsell's passing. The inaugural classic was won by Andrew Symonds who was Rowsell's longtime teammate.

Since its inception, the event has been dominated by teams from Newfoundland and Labrador. The winningest skips are Nathan Young, Simon Perry, Stacie Curtis, Brooke Godsland and Mackenzie Mitchell who have all won the event twice. The only team not from Newfoundland to win the classic was New Brunswick's Scott Jones in 2025.

== Past champions ==
=== Men ===
Year	Winning team	Runner up team	Purse (CAD)
2021	(Newfoundland and Labrador) Andrew Symonds, Colin Thomas, Chris Ford, Keith Jewer	(Newfoundland and Labrador) Ryan McNeil Lamswood, Daniel Bruce, Nathan King, Aaron Feltham	$6,500
2022	(Newfoundland and Labrador) Nathan Young, Sam Follett, Nathan Locke, Ben Stringer	(Newfoundland and Labrador) Andrew Symonds, Colin Thomas, Stephen Trickett, Keith Jewer	$16,000
2023	(Newfoundland and Labrador) Nathan Young, Sam Follett, Nathan Locke, Ben Stringer	(Newfoundland and Labrador) Andrew Symonds, Colin Thomas, Stephen Trickett, Keith Jewer	$14,000
2024	(Newfoundland and Labrador) Simon Perry, Nicholas Codner, Brayden Snow, Carter Holden	(Newfoundland and Labrador) Andrew Symonds, Trent Skanes, Stephen Trickett, Keith Jewer	$13,000
2025	(New Brunswick) Jeremy Mallais (Fourth), Scott Jones (Skip), Brian King, Jared Bezanson	(Prince Edward Island) Tyler Smith, Adam Cocks, Ed White (3 player team)	$15,000
2026	(Newfoundland and Labrador) Simon Perry, Nicholas Codner, Brayden Snow, Dylan Hancock	(Newfoundland and Labrador) Stephen Trickett, Adam Boland, Mike Mosher (3 player team)	$7,000

=== Women ===
Year	Winning team	Runner up team	Purse (CAD)
2021	(Newfoundland and Labrador) Mackenzie Mitchell, Katie Follett, Sarah Chaytor, Kate Paterson	(Newfoundland and Labrador) Erica Curtis, Mackenzie Glynn, Julie Hynes, Camille Burt	$2,500
2022	(Newfoundland and Labrador) Stacie Curtis, Erica Curtis, Julie Hynes, Camille Burt	(Newfoundland and Labrador) Sarah Hill, Kelli Sharpe, Beth Hamilton, Adrienne Mercer	$5,200
2023	(Newfoundland and Labrador) Brooke Godsland, Erin Porter, Sarah McNeil Lamswood, Kate Paterson	(Newfoundland and Labrador) Stacie Curtis, Erica Curtis, Julie Hynes, Camille Burt	$4,675
2024	(Newfoundland and Labrador) Brooke Godsland, Erin Porter, Sarah McNeil Lamswood, Kate Paterson	(Newfoundland and Labrador) Sarah Boland, Kelli Sharpe, Beth Hamilton, Adrienne Mercer	$6,000
2025	(Newfoundland and Labrador) Mackenzie Mitchell, Jessica Wiseman, Kristina Adams, Stacie Curtis	(Newfoundland and Labrador) Sarah Boland, Kelli Sharpe, Beth Hamilton, Adrienne Mercer	$5,500
2026	(Newfoundland and Labrador) Cailey Locke, Hayley Gushue, Emily Neary, Sitaye Penney	(Newfoundland and Labrador) Krista Crowther, Erica Curtis, Sarah Day, Mackenzie Dinn	$4,000

=== Open ===
Year	Winning team	Runner up team
2020	(Newfoundland and Labrador) Andrew Symonds, Chris Ford, Daniel Bruce, Keith Jewer	(Newfoundland and Labrador) Ryan McNeil Lamswood, Joel Krats, James Trickett, Nathan King
