= 2020 Canadian Junior Curling Championships =

2020 Canadian curling championship

2020 New Holland Canadian Junior Curling Championships
- Host city: Langley, British Columbia
- Arena: Langley Curling Centre; George Preston Recreation Centre
- Dates: January 18–26
- Men's winner: Manitoba 2
- Curling club: Assiniboine Memorial CC, Winnipeg
- Skip: Jacques Gauthier
- Third: Jordan Peters
- Second: Brayden Payette
- Lead: Zack Bilawka
- Coach: John Lund
- Finalist: Newfoundland and Labrador (Bruce)
- Women's winner: Manitoba
- Curling club: Altona CC, Altona
- Skip: Mackenzie Zacharias
- Third: Karlee Burgess
- Second: Emily Zacharias
- Lead: Lauren Lenentine
- Coach: Sheldon Zacharias
- Finalist: Alberta (Marks)

The 2020 New Holland Canadian Junior Curling Championships was held from January 18 to 26 at the Langley Curling Centre and the George Preston Recreation Centre in Langley, British Columbia. The winners represented Canada at the 2020 World Junior Curling Championships in Krasnoyarsk, Russia.

In the women's final, Mackenzie Zacharias and her rink of Karlee Burgess, Emily Zacharias and Lauren Lenentine out of the Altona Curling Club in Altona, Manitoba capped off a perfect 11–0 record defeating Alberta's Abby Marks rink 10–3 including a score of four in the eighth end. It was a third championship win for Burgess as she also won the title in 2016 and 2018. In the men's final, Jacques Gauthier and his team of Jordan Peters, Brayden Payette and Zack Bilawka curling out of the Assiniboine Memorial Curling Club in Winnipeg, Manitoba defeated Newfoundland's Daniel Bruce rink 8–6 to make it an all Manitoba sweep in both the men's and women's events.

== Men ==
=== Round-robin standings ===
Final round-robin standings

Key
| Teams to Championship pool |
| Teams to Tiebreakers |

| Pool A | Skip | W | L |
|---|---|---|---|
| Saskatchewan | Rylan Kleiter | 5 | 1 |
| Newfoundland and Labrador | Daniel Bruce | 5 | 1 |
| Alberta | Ryan Jacques | 3 | 3 |
| British Columbia | Hayato Sato | 3 | 3 |
| British Columbia (Host) | Johnson Tao | 3 | 3 |
| Ontario | Owen Purdy | 2 | 4 |
| Northwest Territories | Sawer Kaeser | 0 | 6 |

| Pool B | Skip | W | L |
|---|---|---|---|
| Manitoba 2 | Jacques Gauthier | 5 | 1 |
| Prince Edward Island | Tyler Smith | 5 | 1 |
| Manitoba | Brett Walter | 4 | 2 |
| Nova Scotia | Graeme Weagle | 4 | 2 |
| Northern Ontario | Jacob Horgan | 2 | 4 |
| Quebec | Gregory Cheal | 1 | 5 |
| New Brunswick | Liam Marin | 0 | 6 |

=== Championship Pool Standings ===
Final Championship Pool Standings

Key
| Teams to Playoffs |

| Province | Skip | W | L |
|---|---|---|---|
| Manitoba 2 | Jacques Gauthier | 9 | 1 |
| Newfoundland and Labrador | Daniel Bruce | 8 | 2 |
| Saskatchewan | Rylan Kleiter | 7 | 3 |
| Alberta | Ryan Jacques | 6 | 4 |
| Prince Edward Island | Tyler Smith | 6 | 4 |
| Manitoba | Brett Walter | 5 | 5 |
| Nova Scotia | Graeme Weagle | 5 | 5 |
| British Columbia | Hayato Sato | 4 | 6 |

=== Playoffs ===
| Semifinal | | | Final |
| | | | 1 | Manitoba 2 | 8 |
| 2 | Newfoundland and Labrador | 9 | 2 | Newfoundland and Labrador | 6 |
| 3 | Saskatchewan | 8 |

==== Semifinal ====
Saturday, January 25, 11:00 am

| Sheet C | 1 | 2 | 3 | 4 | 5 | 6 | 7 | 8 | 9 | 10 | Final |
|---|---|---|---|---|---|---|---|---|---|---|---|
| Newfoundland and Labrador (Bruce) 🔨 | 1 | 0 | 0 | 0 | 1 | 2 | 0 | 5 | 0 | 0 | 9 |
| Saskatchewan (Kleiter) | 0 | 2 | 1 | 0 | 0 | 0 | 1 | 0 | 3 | 1 | 8 |

Player percentages
| Newfoundland and Labrador | | Saskatchewan | |
|---|---|---|---|
| Nathan King | 68% | Matthieu Taillon | 90% |
| Joel Krats | 84% | Joshua Mattern | 84% |
| Ryan McNeil Lamswood | 81% | Trevor Johnson | 81% |
| Daniel Bruce | 80% | Rylan Kleiter | 76% |
| Total | 79% | Total | 83% |

==== Final ====
Sunday, January 26, 2:00 pm

| Sheet C | 1 | 2 | 3 | 4 | 5 | 6 | 7 | 8 | 9 | 10 | Final |
|---|---|---|---|---|---|---|---|---|---|---|---|
| Manitoba 2 (Gauthier) 🔨 | 0 | 1 | 2 | 1 | 0 | 2 | 0 | 2 | 0 | X | 8 |
| Newfoundland and Labrador (Bruce) | 0 | 0 | 0 | 0 | 2 | 0 | 2 | 0 | 2 | X | 6 |

Player percentages
| Manitoba 2 | | Newfoundland and Labrador | |
|---|---|---|---|
| Zack Bilawka | 99% | Nathan King | 79% |
| Brayden Payette | 91% | Joel Krats | 63% |
| Jordan Peters | 91% | Ryan McNeil Lamswood | 76% |
| Jacques Gauthier | 88% | Daniel Bruce | 72% |
| Total | 92% | Total | 72% |

== Women ==
=== Round-robin standings ===
Final round-robin standings

Key
| Teams to Championship pool |

| Pool A | Skip | W | L |
|---|---|---|---|
| Alberta | Abby Marks | 5 | 1 |
| Ontario | Sierra Sutherland | 4 | 2 |
| Newfoundland and Labrador | Mackenzie Mitchell | 4 | 2 |
| Saskatchewan | Ashley Thevenot | 4 | 2 |
| British Columbia | Kaila Buchy | 3 | 3 |
| Northwest Territories | Tyanna Bain | 1 | 5 |
| Yukon | Bayly Scoffin | 0 | 6 |

| Pool B | Skip | W | L |
|---|---|---|---|
| Manitoba | Mackenzie Zacharias | 6 | 0 |
| Nova Scotia | Taylour Stevens | 5 | 1 |
| New Brunswick | Melodie Forsythe | 3 | 3 |
| Quebec | Noémie Gauthier | 3 | 3 |
| Northern Ontario | Kira Brunton | 2 | 4 |
| Prince Edward Island | Lauren Ferguson | 1 | 5 |
| Nunavut | Sadie Pinksen | 1 | 5 |

=== Championship Pool Standings ===
Final Championship Pool Standings

Key
| Teams to Playoffs |
| Teams to Tiebreakers |

| Province | Skip | W | L |
|---|---|---|---|
| Manitoba | Mackenzie Zacharias | 10 | 0 |
| Nova Scotia | Taylour Stevens | 8 | 2 |
| New Brunswick | Melodie Forsythe | 6 | 4 |
| Alberta | Abby Marks | 6 | 4 |
| Quebec | Noémie Gauthier | 6 | 4 |
| Ontario | Sierra Sutherland | 5 | 5 |
| Saskatchewan | Ashley Thevenot | 5 | 5 |
| Newfoundland and Labrador | Mackenzie Mitchell | 4 | 6 |

=== Tiebreakers ===
Friday, January 24, 2:00 pm

| Sheet E | 1 | 2 | 3 | 4 | 5 | 6 | 7 | 8 | 9 | 10 | Final |
|---|---|---|---|---|---|---|---|---|---|---|---|
| Alberta (Marks) 🔨 | 1 | 1 | 1 | 1 | 1 | 3 | X | X | X | X | 8 |
| Quebec (Gauthier) | 0 | 0 | 0 | 0 | 0 | 0 | X | X | X | X | 0 |

Player percentages
| Alberta | | Quebec | |
|---|---|---|---|
| Jamie Scott | 63% | Florence Boivin | 75% |
| Paige Papley | 69% | Meaghan Rivett | 79% |
| Catherine Clifford | 88% | Léandra Roberge | 65% |
| Abby Marks | 92% | Noémie Gauthier | 56% |
| Total | 78% | Total | 69% |

Saturday, January 25, 11:00 am

| Sheet E | 1 | 2 | 3 | 4 | 5 | 6 | 7 | 8 | 9 | 10 | Final |
|---|---|---|---|---|---|---|---|---|---|---|---|
| New Brunswick (Forsythe) 🔨 | 1 | 0 | 1 | 0 | 1 | 0 | 0 | 0 | X | X | 3 |
| Alberta (Marks) | 0 | 2 | 0 | 2 | 0 | 1 | 2 | 3 | X | X | 10 |

Player percentages
| New Brunswick | | Alberta | |
|---|---|---|---|
| Caylee Smith | 69% | Jamie Scott | 67% |
| Deanna MacDonald | 44% | Paige Papley | 77% |
| Carly Smith | 80% | Catherine Clifford | 77% |
| Melodie Forsythe | 44% | Abby Marks | 72% |
| Total | 61% | Total | 73% |

=== Playoffs ===
| Semifinal | | | Final |
| | | | 1 | Manitoba | 10 |
| 2 | Nova Scotia | 5 | 3 | Alberta | 3 |
| 3 | Alberta | 6 |

==== Semifinal ====
Saturday, January 25, 4:00 pm

| Sheet C | 1 | 2 | 3 | 4 | 5 | 6 | 7 | 8 | 9 | 10 | 11 | Final |
|---|---|---|---|---|---|---|---|---|---|---|---|---|
| Nova Scotia (Stevens) 🔨 | 1 | 1 | 0 | 0 | 2 | 0 | 0 | 0 | 0 | 1 | 0 | 5 |
| Alberta (Marks) | 0 | 0 | 3 | 1 | 0 | 0 | 0 | 0 | 1 | 0 | 1 | 6 |

Player percentages
| Nova Scotia | | Alberta | |
|---|---|---|---|
| Cate Fitzgerald | 77% | Jamie Scott | 82% |
| Kate Callaghan | 75% | Paige Papley | 77% |
| Lindsey Burgess | 80% | Catherine Clifford | 74% |
| Taylour Stevens | 55% | Abby Marks | 69% |
| Total | 72% | Total | 76% |

==== Final ====
Sunday, January 26, 9:00 am

| Sheet C | 1 | 2 | 3 | 4 | 5 | 6 | 7 | 8 | 9 | 10 | Final |
|---|---|---|---|---|---|---|---|---|---|---|---|
| Manitoba (Zacharias) 🔨 | 2 | 0 | 1 | 0 | 0 | 1 | 0 | 4 | 2 | X | 10 |
| Alberta (Marks) | 0 | 1 | 0 | 1 | 0 | 0 | 1 | 0 | 0 | X | 3 |

Player percentages
| Manitoba | | Alberta | |
|---|---|---|---|
| Lauren Lenentine | 81% | Jamie Scott | 86% |
| Emily Zacharias | 86% | Paige Papley | 74% |
| Karlee Burgess | 88% | Catherine Clifford | 75% |
| Mackenzie Zacharias | 89% | Abby Marks | 69% |
| Total | 86% | Total | 76% |

== Qualification ==
=== Alberta ===
The Alberta Junior Championships were held from January 1–5, 2020 at the Lloydminster Curling Club in Lloydminster, Alberta.

The championship was held in a round robin format, which qualified three teams for a championship round.

Pre-Playoff Results:

| Men | W | L |
|---|---|---|
| Ryan Jacques (Saville) | 7 | 0 |
| Nathan Molberg (St. Albert) | 5 | 2 |
| Jacob Libbus (Saville) | 5 | 2 |
| Cole Adams (Glencoe) | 4 | 3 |
| Jared Palanuik (Airdrie) | 3 | 4 |
| Cole Ector (Saville) | 2 | 5 |
| Max Kobylnyk (Calgary) | 1 | 6 |
| Cortland Sonnenberg (Sexsmith) | 1 | 6 |

| Women | W | L |
|---|---|---|
| Zoe Cinnamon (Airdrie) | 5 | 2 |
| Abby Marks (Saville) | 5 | 2 |
| Claire Booth (Red Deer) | 5 | 2 |
| Ryleigh Bakker (Glencoe) | 4 | 3 |
| Hollie Vincent (Red Deer) | 4 | 3 |
| Jessica Wytrychowski (Airdrie) | 3 | 4 |
| Kathryn Lepine (Airdrie) | 2 | 5 |
| Rebecca Bartz (St. Albert) | 0 | 7 |

Playoff Results:

- Men's Semifinal: Molberg 6 - Libbus 8
- Men's Final: Jacques 6 - Libbus 5
- Women's Semifinal: Marks 8 - Booth 4
- Women's Final: Cinnamon 4 - Marks 6

=== British Columbia ===
The BC Junior Championships were held from December 28, 2019 - January 2, 2020 at the Victoria Curling Club in Victoria, British Columbia.

The championship was held in a round robin format, which qualified three teams for a championship round.

Pre-Playoff Results:

| Men | W | L |
|---|---|---|
| Hayato Sato (Royal City) | 7 | 0 |
| Johnson Tao (Richmond) | 6 | 1 |
| Erik Colwell (Vernon) | 5 | 2 |
| Brayden Carpenter (Tunnel Town) | 4 | 3 |
| Dawson Ballard (Langley) | 3 | 4 |
| Thomas Reed (Royal City) | 2 | 5 |
| Chris Parkinson (Nanaimo) | 1 | 6 |
| Colorado Marr (Kamloops) | 0 | 7 |

| Women | W | L |
|---|---|---|
| Kaila Buchy (Kimberley) | 5 | 2 |
| Sarah Daniels (Delta Thistle) | 5 | 2 |
| Jensen Taylor (Tunnel Town) | 5 | 2 |
| Holly Hafeli (Kamloops) | 4 | 3 |
| Elizabeth Bowles (Delta Thistle) | 3 | 4 |
| Gracelyn Richards (Comox Valley) | 3 | 4 |
| Maeve Calhoun (Kamloops) | 2 | 5 |
| Rebecca Douglas (Gibsons) | 1 | 6 |

Playoff Results:

- Men's Semifinal: Tao 11 - Colwell 6
- Men's Final: Sato 9 - Tao 3
- Women's Semifinal: Daniels 6 - Taylor 7
- Women's Final: Buchy 8 - Taylor 6

=== Manitoba ===
The Telus Junior Provincial Championships were held from December 31, 2019 - January 5, 2020 at the Dauphin Recreation Centre in Dauphin, Manitoba.

The championship was held in a round robin format, which qualified four teams for a page-playoff championship round.

Pre-Playoff Results:

| Men | W | L |
|---|---|---|
Asham Black Group
| Brett Walter (AMCC) | 6 | 1 |
| Ryan Wiebe (St. Vital) | 6 | 1 |
| Thomas Titchkosky (Morden) | 5 | 2 |
| Josh Friesen (AMCC) | 4 | 3 |
| Jordon McDonald (St. Vital) | 3 | 4 |
| Matt Bijl (Stonewall) | 3 | 4 |
| Luke Steski (St. Vital) | 1 | 6 |
| Hunter Dundas (Swan River) | 0 | 7 |
Extreme Force Red Group
| Jacques Gauthier (AMCC) | 7 | 0 |
| Jack Hykaway (AMCC) | 6 | 1 |
| Emerson Klimpke (Morris) | 5 | 2 |
| Josh Maisey (Winnipeg Beach) | 3 | 4 |
| Brooks Freeman (Virden) | 3 | 4 |
| Jordan Johnson (St. Vital) | 3 | 4 |
| Tyson Beyak (Winnipegosis) | 1 | 6 |
| Luke Davidson (Dauphin) | 0 | 7 |

| Women | W | L |
|---|---|---|
Asham Black Group
| Mackenzie Zacharias (Altona) | 7 | 0 |
| Hayley Bergman (Morris) | 6 | 1 |
| Alex Friesen (Heather) | 5 | 2 |
| Grace Beaudry (St. Vital) | 3 | 4 |
| Brooklyn Onagi (AMCC) | 2 | 5 |
| Hallie McCannell (Brandon) | 2 | 5 |
| Victoria Beaudry (St. Vital) | 2 | 5 |
| Anya Jackson (Dauphin) | 1 | 6 |
Extreme Force Red Group
| Serena Gray-Withers (Granite) | 6 | 1 |
| Katy Lukowich (East St. Paul) | 6 | 1 |
| Talyia Tober (Fort Garry) | 4 | 3 |
| Meghan Walter (East St. Paul) | 4 | 3 |
| Arah Davies (Granite) | 4 | 3 |
| Presley Sagert (Swan River) | 2 | 5 |
| Cassandra Stobbe (AMCC) | 2 | 5 |
| Makenna Hadway (Dauphin) | 0 | 7 |

Playoff Results:

- Men's A1 vs B1: Walter 2 - Gauthier 7
- Men's A2 vs B2: Wiebe 6 - Hykaway 4
- Men's Semifinal: Walter 9 - Wiebe 6
- Men's Final: Gauthier 7 - Walter 8
- Women's A1 vs B1: Zacharias 6 - Gray-Withers 3
- Women's A2 vs B2: Bergman 5 - Lukowich 4
- Women's Semifinal: Gray-Withers 9 - Bergman 1
- Women's Final: Zacharias 10 - Gray-Withers 4

=== New Brunswick ===
The New Brunswick Papa John's Pizza U21 Championships were held from December 27–30, 2019 at the Thistle St. Andrews Curling Club in Saint John, New Brunswick.

The championship was held in a modified triple-knockout format, which qualified three teams for a championship round.

Pre-Playoff Results:

| Men | W | L |
|---|---|---|
| Liam Marin (Thistle) | 5 | 1 |
| Josh Nowlan (Moncton) | 4 | 2 |
| Alex Peasley (Gage) | 1 | 3 |
| Jamie Stewart (Thistle) | 1 | 3 |
| Declan Johnston (Florenceville) | 1 | 3 |

| Women | W | L |
|---|---|---|
| Melodie Forsythe (Moncton) | 5 | 1 |
| Justine Comeau (Fredericton) | 4 | 2 |
| Olivia Wynter (Moncton) | 3 | 3 |
| Brooke Tracy (Gladstone) | 2 | 3 |
| Jenna Campbell (Fredericton) | 1 | 3 |
| Kate Paterson (Carleton) | 0 | 3 |

Playoff Results:

- Men's Semifinal: Nowlan 7 - Marin 8
- Men's Final (N/A): Marin - Marin
- Women's Semifinal: Comeau 5 - Forsythe 6
- Women's Final (N/A): Forsythe - Forsythe

=== Newfoundland and Labrador ===
The Junior Provincials were held from December 27–29, 2019 at the Bally Haly Golf & Curling Club in St John's, Newfoundland and Labrador.

The men's championship was held in a double round robin format, the women's event was held in a best of five series between two rinks.

Pre-Playoff Results:

| Men | W | L |
|---|---|---|
| Daniel Bruce (St. John's) | 6 | 0 |
| Alex McDonah (St. John's) | 4 | 2 |
| Nathan Young (St. John's) | 2 | 4 |
| Nichols O'Neill (Corner Brook) | 0 | 6 |

| Women | W | L |
|---|---|---|
| Mackenzie Mitchell (St. John's) | 3 | 0 |
| Sarah McNeil Lamswood (Caribou) | 0 | 3 |

Playoff Results:

- No playoff round was required as Team Bruce had already beaten everybody twice.

=== Northern Ontario ===
The Best Western Junior Provincials were held from December 28–30, 2019 at the Hearst Community Curling Club in Hearst, Ontario.

The championship was held in a double round robin format, with the top two teams competing in the championship final.

Pre-Playoff Results:

| Men | W | L |
|---|---|---|
| Jacob Horgan (Curl Sudbury) | 4 | 0 |
| Jonathon Vellinga (Kakabeka Falls) | 2 | 2 |
| Nicholas Lemieux (Community First) | 0 | 4 |

| Women | W | L |
|---|---|---|
| Abby Deschene (Curl Sudbury) | 2 | 2 |
| Kira Brunton (Curl Sudbury) | 2 | 2 |
| Bella Croisier (Idylwylde) | 2 | 2 |

Playoff Results:

- Men's Final: Horgan 7 - Vellinga 6
- Women's Tiebreaker: Brunton 5 - Croisier 4
- Women's Final: Deschene 4 - Brunton 9

=== Northwest Territories ===
The NWTCA Junior Curling Championships were held from December 13–15, 2019.

The men's championship was held in a best of five series between two rinks, the women's event was held in a double round robin format.

Results:

| Men | W | L |
|---|---|---|
| Sawer Kaeser (Fort Smith) | 3 | 2 |
| Adam Naugler (Yellowknife) | 2 | 3 |

| Women | W | L |
|---|---|---|
| Tyanna Bain (Inuvik) | 4 | 0 |
| Cassie Rogers (Yellowknife) | 2 | 2 |
| Halli-Rai Delorey (Hay River) | 0 | 4 |

=== Nova Scotia ===
The AMJ Campbell U21 Championships were held from December 27–31, 2019 at the Lakeshore Curling Club in Lower Sackville, Nova Scotia.

The championship was held in a modified triple-knockout format, which qualified three teams for a championship round.

Pre-Playoff Results:

| Men | W | L |
|---|---|---|
| Graeme Weagle (Chester) | 5 | 2 |
| Graham Loewen (Mayflower) | 4 | 2 |
| Ethan Young (Mayflower) | 3 | 2 |
| Ryan Strang (Lakeshore) | 3 | 3 |
| Calan MacIsaac (Truro) | 2 | 3 |
| Keith Langlois (CFB Halifax) | 1 | 3 |
| Nick Mosher (CFB Halifax) | 1 | 3 |
| Colin Sheffield (Glooscap) | 0 | 3 |

| Women | W | L |
|---|---|---|
| Taylour Stevens (Halifax) | 7 | 0 |
| Kaylee Nodding (Bridgewater) | 3 | 3 |
| Cally Moore (Lakeshore) | 2 | 3 |
| Marin Callaghan (CFB Halifax) | 2 | 3 |
| Brianne Batherson (Lakeshore) | 2 | 3 |
| Allyson MacNutt (Truro) | 1 | 3 |
| Maria Fitzgerald (NSCA) | 1 | 3 |
| Clara Mosher (NSCA) | 1 | 3 |

Playoff Results:

- Men's Semifinal: Loewen 9 - Young 6
- Men's Final: Weagle 10 - Loewen 6
- No women's playoff was required as Team Stevens won all three qualifying events.

=== Nunavut ===
- Men's Team: No men's team declared
- Women's Team: Sadie Pinksen (Iqaluit)

=== Ontario ===
The Ontario U-21 Curling Championships were held from December 27–30, 2019 at the Guelph Curling Club in Guelph.

The championship was held in a round robin, which qualified the top three teams for a championship round.

Pre-Playoff Results:

| Men | W | L |
|---|---|---|
| Owen Purdy (Cataraqui) | 6 | 1 |
| Jordan McNamara (Navy) | 6 | 1 |
| Sam Mooibroek (Galt) | 5 | 2 |
| Landan Rooney (Alexandria) | 4 | 3 |
| Brady Lumley (Welland) | 3 | 4 |
| Nicholas Bissonnette (Coldwater) | 2 | 5 |
| Ryan Hahn (St. Catharines) | 2 | 5 |
| Kai Collins (Rideau) | 0 | 7 |

| Women | W | L |
|---|---|---|
| Sierra Sutherland (Rideau) | 5 | 2 |
| Emily Deschenes (Manotick) | 4 | 3 |
| Madelyn Warriner (Listowel) | 4 | 3 |
| Rachel Steele (Port Perry) | 4 | 3 |
| Kayla Gray (Perth) | 3 | 4 |
| Isabelle Ladouceur (KW Granite) | 3 | 4 |
| Mackenzie Kiemele (Elora) | 3 | 4 |
| Lindsay Thorne (Rideau) | 2 | 5 |

Playoff Results:

- Men's Semifinal: McNamara 7 - Mooibroek 6
- Men's Final: Purdy 8 - McNamara 7
- Women's Tiebreaker: Warriner 6 - Steele 4
- Women's Semifinal: Deschenes 8 - Warriner 4
- Women's Final: Sutherland 9 - Deschenes 8

=== Prince Edward Island ===
The Pepsi PEI Provincial Junior Curling Championships were held from December 27–29, 2019 at the Crapaud Community Curling Club in Crapaud, Prince Edward Island.

The championship was held in a modified triple-knockout format, which qualified three teams for a championship round.

Pre-Playoff Results:

| Men | W | L |
|---|---|---|
| Tyler Smith (Montague) | 4 | 0 |
| Mitchell Schut (Cornwall) | 2 | 3 |
| Brayden Snow (Charlottetown) | 0 | 3 |

| Women | W | L |
|---|---|---|
| Lauren Ferguson (Cornwall) | 5 | 1 |
| Rachel MacLean (Cornwall) | 2 | 2 |
| Katie Shaw (Cornwall) | 1 | 3 |
| Clara Jack (Cornwall) | 1 | 3 |

Playoff Results:

- No men's playoff was required as Team Smith won all three qualifying events.
- Women's Semifinal: MacLean 3 - Ferguson 8
- Women's Final (N/A): Ferguson - Ferguson

=== Quebec ===
The Quebec Performance Brush U21 Provincials were held from January 6–8, 2020 at the Club de curling Rivière-du-Loup in Rivière-du-Loup, Quebec.

The men's championship was held in a round robin format, the women's event was held in a best of five series between two rinks.

Pre-Playoff Results:

| Men | W | L |
|---|---|---|
| Raphaël Patry (Kénogami) | 3 | 0 |
| Jérôme Adam (Belvédère) | 2 | 1 |
| Greg Cheal (Lennoxville) | 1 | 2 |
| Olivier Pelletier-Blanchard (Buckingham) | 0 | 3 |

| Women | W | L |
|---|---|---|
| Noémie Gauthier (Kénogami) | 3 | 1 |
| Gabrielle Lavoie (Victoria) | 1 | 3 |

Playoff Results:

- Men's Semifinal: Adam 6 - Cheal 7
- Men's Final: Patry 4 - Cheal 7

=== Saskatchewan ===
The Junior Provincials were held from December 27, 2019 – January 1, 2020 at the Sutherland Curling Club in Saskatoon, Saskatchewan.

The championship was held in a round robin format, which qualified four teams for a page-playoff championship round.

Pre-Playoff Results:

| Men | W | L |
|---|---|---|
| Rylan Kleiter (Sutherland) | 7 | 0 |
| Nathen Pomedli (Nutana) | 5 | 2 |
| Cody Sutherland (Sutherland) | 5 | 2 |
| Daymond Bernath (Sutherland) | 3 | 4 |
| Gavin Steckler (Sutherland) | 3 | 4 |
| Joshua Bryden (Callie) | 3 | 4 |
| Brecklin Gervais (Kronau) | 2 | 5 |
| Matthew Drewitz (Sutherland) | 0 | 7 |

| Women | W | L |
|---|---|---|
| Skylar Ackerman (Nutana) | 6 | 1 |
| Ashley Thevenot (Sutherland) | 6 | 1 |
| Madison Kleiter (Sutherland) | 5 | 2 |
| Krystal Englot (Callie) | 5 | 2 |
| Jessica Farquharson (Yorkton) | 2 | 5 |
| Kyla Thies (Callie) | 2 | 5 |
| Amy Remeshylo (Granite) | 1 | 6 |
| Savanna Taylor (Sutherland) | 1 | 6 |

Playoff Results:

- Men's Tiebreaker 1: Steckler 11 - Bryden 2
- Men's Tiebreaker 2: Bernath 9 - Steckler 5
- Men's 1v2: Kleiter 9 - Pomedli 0
- Men's 3v4: Sutherland 4 - Bernath 6
- Men's Semifinal: Pomedli 6 - Bernath 7
- Men's Final: Kleiter 7 - Bernath 6
- Women's 1v2: Ackerman 4 - Thevenot 6
- Women's 3v4: Kleiter 7 - Englot 8
- Women's Semifinal: Ackerman 11 - Englot 6
- Women's Final: Thevenot 7 - Ackerman 5

=== Yukon ===
- Men's Team: No men's team declared
- Women's Team: Bayly Scoffin (Whitehorse)
