= 2022 Atlantic University Sport Curling Championships =

2022 Subway AUS Curling Championships
- Host city: Windsor, Nova Scotia
- Arena: Windsor Curling Club
- Dates: March 17–19
- Men's winner: (Nova Scotia) Dalhousie Tigers
- Curling club: Halifax CC, Halifax
- Skip: Owen Purcell
- Third: Adam McEachren
- Second: Jeffrey Meagher
- Lead: David McCurdy
- Alternate: Caelan McPherson
- Coach: Anthony Purcell
- Finalist: (Newfoundland and Labrador) Memorial Sea-Hawks (McNeil Lamswood)
- Women's winner: (Nova Scotia) Dalhousie Tigers
- Curling club: Halifax CC, Halifax
- Skip: Sarah Gierling
- Third: Lindsey Burgess
- Second: Amanda Skiffington
- Lead: Natasha Fortin
- Alternate: Sadie Pinksen
- Coach: Karen Skiffington
- Finalist: (New Brunswick) UNB Reds (Campbell)

The 2022 Subway Atlantic University Sport Curling Championships was held from March 17 to 19 at the Windsor Curling Club in Windsor, Nova Scotia. Usually, the top men's team along with the top two women's teams qualify for the U Sports/Curling Canada University Curling Championships, however, it was cancelled due to the COVID-19 pandemic.

== Men ==
=== Teams ===
The teams are listed as follows:

Team	Skip	Third	Second	Lead	Alternate	University
Dalhousie Tigers	Owen Purcell	Adam McEachren	Jeffrey Meagher	David McCurdy	Caelan McPherson	(Nova Scotia) Dalhousie University
Memorial Sea-Hawks	Ryan McNeil Lamswood	Daniel Bruce	Nathan King	Aaron Feltham		(Newfoundland and Labrador) Memorial University of Newfoundland
Saint Mary's Huskies	Graeme Weagle	Scott Weagle	Christopher Churchill	Craig Weagle		(Nova Scotia) Saint Mary's University
UNB Reds	Alex Gallant	Dylan MacDonald	Parker MacFadyen	Nicholas Johnston	James Larlee	University of New Brunswick

=== Round robin standings ===
Final round robin standings

Key
Teams to Playoffs

Team	Skip	W	L	PF	PA	EW	EL	BE	SE
(Nova Scotia) Dalhousie Tigers	Owen Purcell	3	0	21	10	13	6	1	5
(Newfoundland and Labrador) Memorial Sea-Hawks	Ryan McNeil Lamswood	2	1	21	10	10	7	2	4
(Nova Scotia) Saint Mary's Huskies	Graeme Weagle	1	2	14	19	7	10	1	1
(New Brunswick) UNB Reds	Alex Gallant	0	3	8	25	6	13	0	0

=== Round robin results ===
All draw times are listed in Atlantic Time (UTC−03:00).

==== Draw 1 ====
Friday, March 17, 3:00 pm

Sheet 1	1	2	3	4	5	6	7	8	Final
(New Brunswick) UNB Reds (Gallant)	0	0	2	0	1	0	1	X	4
(Nova Scotia) Saint Mary's Huskies (Weagle)	2	1	0	3	0	3	0	X	9

Sheet 2	1	2	3	4	5	6	7	8	Final
(Nova Scotia) Dalhousie Tigers (Purcell)	0	2	0	0	2	0	1	1	6
(Newfoundland and Labrador) Memorial Sea-Hawks (McNeil Lamswood)	0	0	2	1	0	2	0	0	5

==== Draw 2 ====
Saturday, March 18, 2:00 pm

Sheet 3	1	2	3	4	5	6	7	8	Final
(Newfoundland and Labrador) Memorial Sea-Hawks (McNeil Lamswood)	1	0	0	1	0	0	5	X	7
(Nova Scotia) Saint Mary's Huskies (Weagle)	0	2	0	0	0	1	0	X	3

Sheet 4	1	2	3	4	5	6	7	8	Final
(New Brunswick) UNB Reds (Gallant)	0	2	0	1	0	0	0	X	3
(Nova Scotia) Dalhousie Tigers (Purcell)	1	0	3	0	1	1	1	X	7

==== Draw 3 ====
Saturday, March 18, 7:00 pm

Sheet 1	1	2	3	4	5	6	7	8	Final
(Nova Scotia) Saint Mary's Huskies (Weagle)	0	0	0	2	0	X	X	X	2
(Nova Scotia) Dalhousie Tigers (Purcell)	2	1	1	0	4	X	X	X	8

Sheet 2	1	2	3	4	5	6	7	8	Final
(Newfoundland and Labrador) Memorial Sea-Hawks (McNeil Lamswood)	0	5	1	1	2	0	X	X	9
(New Brunswick) UNB Reds (Gallant)	0	0	0	0	0	1	X	X	1

=== Playoffs ===
Semifinal			Final
			1	(Nova Scotia) Dalhousie Tigers	7
2	(Newfoundland and Labrador) Memorial Sea-Hawks	7	2	(Newfoundland and Labrador) Memorial Sea-Hawks	3
3	(Nova Scotia) Saint Mary's Huskies	4

==== Semifinal ====
Sunday, March 19, 9:30 am

Sheet 3	1	2	3	4	5	6	7	8	Final
(Newfoundland and Labrador) Memorial Sea-Hawks (McNeil Lamswood)	1	0	3	0	1	0	2	X	7
(Nova Scotia) Saint Mary's Huskies (Weagle)	0	2	0	1	0	1	0	X	4

==== Final ====
Sunday, March 19, 2:00 pm

Sheet 2	1	2	3	4	5	6	7	8	Final
(Nova Scotia) Dalhousie Tigers (Purcell)	1	0	4	0	1	0	1	X	7
(Newfoundland and Labrador) Memorial Sea-Hawks (McNeil Lamswood)	0	1	0	1	0	1	0	X	3

== Women ==
=== Teams ===
The teams are listed as follows:

Team	Skip	Third	Second	Lead	Alternate	University
Dalhousie Tigers	Sarah Gierling	Lindsey Burgess	Amanda Skiffington	Natasha Fortin	Sadie Pinksen	(Nova Scotia) Dalhousie University
Mount Allison Mounties	Olivia Wynter	Ellen McKay	Lauren Whiteway	Lauren Sallaj		(New Brunswick) Mount Allison University
Saint Mary's Huskies	Taylour Stevens	Emma Butler	Stephanie Carson	Katherine Myers		(Nova Scotia) Saint Mary's University
UNB Reds	Jenna Campbell	Carly Smith	Deanna MacDonald	Kirsten Donovan	Véronique Carroll	University of New Brunswick

=== Round robin standings ===
Final round robin standings

Key
Teams to Playoffs

Team	Skip	W	L	PF	PA	EW	EL	BE	SE
(Nova Scotia) Dalhousie Tigers	Sarah Gierling	3	0	11	8	7	5	2	2
(New Brunswick) Mount Allison Mounties	Olivia Wynter	1	2	15	19	11	8	1	3
(New Brunswick) UNB Reds	Jenna Campbell	1	2	15	16	6	11	5	0
(Nova Scotia) Saint Mary's Huskies	Taylour Stevens	1	2	9	7	6	6	1	2

=== Round robin results ===
All draw times are listed in Atlantic Time (UTC−03:00).

==== Draw 1 ====
Friday, March 17, 3:00 pm

Sheet 3	1	2	3	4	5	6	7	8	Final
(Nova Scotia) Saint Mary's Huskies (Stevens)	X	X	X	X	X	X	X	X	L
(Nova Scotia) Dalhousie Tigers (Gierling)	X	X	X	X	X	X	X	X	W

Sheet 4	1	2	3	4	5	6	7	8	Final
(New Brunswick) Mount Allison Mounties (Wynter)	0	1	1	0	2	0	2	X	6
(New Brunswick) UNB Reds (Campbell)	4	0	0	0	0	5	0	X	9

==== Draw 2 ====
Saturday, March 18, 2:00 pm

Sheet 1	1	2	3	4	5	6	7	8	Final
(Nova Scotia) Saint Mary's Huskies (Stevens)	0	0	2	0	0	0	1	0	3
(New Brunswick) Mount Allison Mounties (Wynter)	0	1	0	1	0	1	0	1	4

Sheet 2	1	2	3	4	5	6	7	8	Final
(Nova Scotia) Dalhousie Tigers (Gierling)	0	0	0	0	1	0	1	2	4
(New Brunswick) UNB Reds (Campbell)	0	0	0	2	0	1	0	0	3

==== Draw 3 ====
Saturday, March 18, 7:00 pm

Sheet 3	1	2	3	4	5	6	7	8	9	Final
(Nova Scotia) Dalhousie Tigers (Gierling)	0	0	0	3	1	0	1	0	2	7
(New Brunswick) Mount Allison Mounties (Wynter)	1	0	0	0	0	3	0	1	0	5

Sheet 4	1	2	3	4	5	6	7	8	Final
(New Brunswick) UNB Reds (Campbell)	0	2	0	0	1	0	0	X	3
(Nova Scotia) Saint Mary's Huskies (Stevens)	0	0	2	2	0	1	1	X	6

=== Playoffs ===
Semifinal			Final
			1	(Nova Scotia) Dalhousie Tigers	4
2	(New Brunswick) Mount Allison Mounties	7	3	(New Brunswick) UNB Reds	3
3	(New Brunswick) UNB Reds	8

==== Semifinal ====
Sunday, March 19, 9:30 am

Sheet 2	1	2	3	4	5	6	7	8	Final
(New Brunswick) Mount Allison Mounties (Wynter)	0	0	3	0	1	0	2	1	7
(New Brunswick) UNB Reds (Campbell)	3	2	0	1	0	2	0	0	8

==== Final ====
Sunday, March 19, 2:00 pm

Sheet 3	1	2	3	4	5	6	7	8	9	Final
(Nova Scotia) Dalhousie Tigers (Gierling)	0	1	0	0	1	0	0	1	1	4
(New Brunswick) UNB Reds (Campbell)	1	0	1	0	0	1	0	0	0	3
