= 2022 Newfoundland and Labrador Tankard =

- Host city: St. John's, Newfoundland and Labrador
- Arena: RE/MAX Centre
- Dates: February 8–13
- Winner: Team Young
- Curling club: RE/MAX Centre, St. John's
- Skip: Nathan Young
- Third: Sam Follett
- Second: Nathan Locke
- Lead: Ben Stringer
- Alternate: Nicholas Codner
- Coach: Toby McDonald
- Finalist: Greg Smith

The 2022 Newfoundland and Labrador Tankard, the men's provincial curling championship for Newfoundland and Labrador, was held from February 8 to 13 at the RE/MAX Centre in St. John's, Newfoundland and Labrador. The winning Nathan Young team represented Newfoundland and Labrador at the 2022 Tim Hortons Brier, Canada's national men's curling championship in Lethbridge, Alberta.

== Teams ==
The teams are listed as follows:

Skip	Third	Second	Lead	Alternate	Club
Ryan McNeil Lamswood	Daniel Bruce	Nathan King	Aaron Feltham	Joel Krats	RE/MAX Centre, St. John's
Sean O'Leary	Andrew Trickett	Dylan Hancock	Jake Young		RE/MAX Centre, St. John's
Ken Peddigrew	David Noftall	Andrew Manuel	Craig Dowden	Mark Healy	RE/MAX Centre, St. John's
Cory Schuh (Fourth)	Trent Skanes (Skip)	Adam Boland	Spencer Wicks	Glenn Goss	RE/MAX Centre, St. John's
Alex Smith	Stephen Trickett	Zach Young	Mike Mosher	Randy Turpin	RE/MAX Centre, St. John's
Greg Smith	Greg Blyde	Carter Small	Alex McDonah	Evan McDonah	RE/MAX Centre, St. John's
Andrew Symonds	Colin Thomas	Chris Ford	Keith Jewer		RE/MAX Centre, St. John's
Dave Thomas	Cody Parsons	Floyd Francis	Dwight Keeping	Travis Cormier	Gateway CC, Port aux Basques
Nathan Young	Sam Follett	Nathan Locke	Ben Stringer	Nicholas Codner	RE/MAX Centre, St. John's

== Round-robin standings ==
Final round-robin standings

Key
Teams to Playoffs

Skip	W	L	PF	PA	EW	EL	BE	SE
Nathan Young	8	0	59	32	33	21	6	8
Greg Smith	7	1	60	42	39	25	3	17
Alex Smith	6	2	62	49	39	31	2	13
Trent Skanes	5	3	55	45	34	33	10	12
Andrew Symonds	4	4	49	38	31	31	4	11
Ryan McNeil Lamswood	3	5	48	45	27	29	5	11
Ken Peddigrew	2	6	39	56	29	36	1	7
Sean O'Leary	1	7	38	63	29	37	3	7
Dave Thomas	0	8	31	71	24	42	3	4

== Round-robin results ==
All draws are listed in Newfoundland Time (UTC−03:30).

=== Draw 1 ===
Tuesday, February 8, 1:30 pm

Sheet 2	1	2	3	4	5	6	7	8	9	10	Final
Dave Thomas	0	0	1	0	0	0	1	1	0	X	3
Ryan McNeil Lamswood	3	0	0	1	1	0	0	0	3	X	8

Sheet 3	1	2	3	4	5	6	7	8	9	10	Final
Ken Peddigrew	1	0	0	1	1	0	0	1	0	X	4
Andrew Symonds	0	2	1	0	0	2	1	0	2	X	8

Sheet 4	1	2	3	4	5	6	7	8	9	10	Final
Trent Skanes	0	0	2	0	0	4	0	0	0	1	7
Sean O'Leary	0	0	0	1	1	0	1	1	1	0	5

Sheet 5	1	2	3	4	5	6	7	8	9	10	Final
Alex Smith	3	0	0	2	0	0	2	0	0	X	7
Nathan Young	0	2	1	0	3	2	0	0	1	X	9

=== Draw 2 ===
Tuesday, February 8, 7:30 pm

Sheet 2	1	2	3	4	5	6	7	8	9	10	11	Final
Ken Peddigrew	2	0	0	1	0	2	0	2	0	2	0	9
Alex Smith	0	1	3	0	1	0	2	0	2	0	1	10

Sheet 3	1	2	3	4	5	6	7	8	9	10	11	Final
Greg Smith	0	0	0	1	0	0	2	1	2	0	1	7
Trent Skanes	0	0	2	0	1	1	0	0	0	2	0	6

Sheet 4	1	2	3	4	5	6	7	8	9	10	Final
Nathan Young	0	0	0	0	4	0	1	0	0	1	6
Ryan McNeil Lamswood	0	0	0	1	0	2	0	0	2	0	5

Sheet 5	1	2	3	4	5	6	7	8	9	10	Final
Andrew Symonds	0	1	0	1	3	0	1	0	1	X	7
Sean O'Leary	0	0	2	0	0	0	0	1	0	X	3

=== Draw 3 ===
Wednesday, February 9, 1:30 pm

Sheet 2	1	2	3	4	5	6	7	8	9	10	Final
Andrew Symonds	0	0	0	0	1	0	0	0	2	0	3
Nathan Young	0	2	0	0	0	1	0	1	0	1	5

Sheet 3	1	2	3	4	5	6	7	8	9	10	Final
Alex Smith	2	1	3	0	1	2	0	2	X	X	11
Dave Thomas	0	0	0	3	0	0	2	0	X	X	5

Sheet 4	1	2	3	4	5	6	7	8	9	10	Final
Greg Smith	0	0	2	0	2	2	2	0	1	X	9
Ken Peddigrew	1	2	0	1	0	0	0	1	0	X	5

Sheet 5	1	2	3	4	5	6	7	8	9	10	Final
Ryan McNeil Lamswood	0	3	0	1	0	1	0	0	0	0	5
Trent Skanes	0	0	1	0	1	0	3	1	1	3	10

=== Draw 4 ===
Wednesday, February 9, 7:30 pm

Sheet 2	1	2	3	4	5	6	7	8	9	10	Final
Ryan McNeil Lamswood	1	0	0	2	0	5	0	0	0	0	8
Greg Smith	0	1	1	0	2	0	1	2	1	1	9

Sheet 3	1	2	3	4	5	6	7	8	9	10	Final
Nathan Young	0	2	0	0	3	0	1	1	0	X	7
Sean O'Leary	0	0	1	2	0	0	0	0	1	X	4

Sheet 4	1	2	3	4	5	6	7	8	9	10	Final
Alex Smith	2	0	1	0	2	1	0	1	0	0	7
Andrew Symonds	0	1	0	2	0	0	1	0	1	1	6

Sheet 5	1	2	3	4	5	6	7	8	9	10	Final
Ken Peddigrew	0	1	1	1	1	0	1	0	2	X	7
Dave Thomas	1	0	0	0	0	1	0	1	0	X	3

=== Draw 5 ===
Thursday, February 10, 1:30 pm

Sheet 2	1	2	3	4	5	6	7	8	9	10	Final
Sean O'Leary	0	0	1	0	1	0	0	1	1	0	4
Ken Peddigrew	1	1	0	1	0	1	0	0	0	2	6

Sheet 3	1	2	3	4	5	6	7	8	9	10	Final
Andrew Symonds	3	0	1	0	2	2	X	X	X	X	8
Ryan McNeil Lamswood	0	1	0	1	0	0	X	X	X	X	2

Sheet 4	1	2	3	4	5	6	7	8	9	10	Final
Dave Thomas	0	1	1	0	1	0	0	0	1	X	4
Trent Skanes	2	0	0	2	0	1	1	2	0	X	8

Sheet 5	1	2	3	4	5	6	7	8	9	10	Final
Greg Smith	0	3	0	1	1	0	0	1	1	X	7
Alex Smith	0	0	1	0	0	0	2	0	0	X	3

=== Draw 6 ===
Thursday, February 10, 7:30 pm

Sheet 2	1	2	3	4	5	6	7	8	9	10	Final
Trent Skanes	0	1	1	1	0	1	2	1	1	X	8
Andrew Symonds	0	0	0	0	2	0	0	0	0	X	2

Sheet 3	1	2	3	4	5	6	7	8	9	10	Final
Dave Thomas	1	0	0	0	0	0	X	X	X	X	1
Greg Smith	0	2	2	1	4	1	X	X	X	X	10

Sheet 4	1	2	3	4	5	6	7	8	9	10	Final
Ken Peddigrew	0	1	0	0	1	0	0	X	X	X	2
Nathan Young	2	0	0	1	0	2	3	X	X	X	8

Sheet 5	1	2	3	4	5	6	7	8	9	10	Final
Sean O'Leary	0	0	0	0	0	1	X	X	X	X	1
Ryan McNeil Lamswood	4	2	1	2	1	0	X	X	X	X	10

=== Draw 7 ===
Friday, February 11, 1:30 pm

Sheet 2	1	2	3	4	5	6	7	8	9	10	Final
Nathan Young	1	0	2	0	1	0	2	0	0	1	7
Dave Thomas	0	1	0	1	0	1	0	0	1	0	4

Sheet 3	1	2	3	4	5	6	7	8	9	10	Final
Sean O'Leary	1	0	1	0	0	1	0	2	0	X	5
Alex Smith	0	4	0	2	1	0	1	0	1	X	9

Sheet 4	1	2	3	4	5	6	7	8	9	10	Final
Andrew Symonds	0	1	0	0	2	0	2	1	0	0	6
Greg Smith	0	0	1	1	0	2	0	0	2	1	7

Sheet 5	1	2	3	4	5	6	7	8	9	10	Final
Trent Skanes	0	2	0	2	0	1	1	0	0	2	8
Ken Peddigrew	0	0	2	0	3	0	0	1	0	0	6

=== Draw 8 ===
Friday, February 11, 7:30 pm

Sheet 2	1	2	3	4	5	6	7	8	9	10	Final
Greg Smith	0	1	0	2	0	2	1	0	2	X	8
Sean O'Leary	2	0	1	0	1	0	0	1	0	X	5

Sheet 3	1	2	3	4	5	6	7	8	9	10	Final
Trent Skanes	0	2	0	0	0	0	0	2	0	X	4
Nathan Young	1	0	2	1	0	0	3	0	2	X	9

Sheet 4	1	2	3	4	5	6	7	8	9	10	Final
Ryan McNeil Lamswood	0	2	1	0	0	1	0	0	0	X	4
Alex Smith	3	0	0	0	1	0	2	1	1	X	8

Sheet 5	1	2	3	4	5	6	7	8	9	10	Final
Dave Thomas	0	1	0	0	1	0	0	X	X	X	2
Andrew Symonds	3	0	2	2	0	1	1	X	X	X	9

=== Draw 9 ===
Saturday, February 12, 9:00 am

Sheet 2	1	2	3	4	5	6	7	8	9	10	Final
Alex Smith	1	0	1	0	1	1	1	0	1	1	7
Trent Skanes	0	0	0	1	0	0	0	3	0	0	4

Sheet 3	1	2	3	4	5	6	7	8	9	10	Final
Ryan McNeil Lamswood	0	2	1	2	1	X	X	X	X	X	6
Ken Peddigrew	0	0	0	0	0	X	X	X	X	X	0

Sheet 4	1	2	3	4	5	6	7	8	9	10	11	Final
Sean O'Leary	0	2	0	0	3	1	0	2	0	1	2	11
Dave Thomas	1	0	1	2	0	0	2	0	3	0	0	9

Sheet 5	1	2	3	4	5	6	7	8	9	10	Final
Nathan Young	0	0	1	0	3	0	0	4	X	X	8
Greg Smith	0	0	0	1	0	0	2	0	X	X	3

== Playoffs ==
Semifinal			Final
			1	Nathan Young	8
2	Greg Smith	7	2	Greg Smith	4
3	Alex Smith	6

=== Semifinal ===
Saturday, February 12, 3:00 pm

Sheet 4	1	2	3	4	5	6	7	8	9	10	Final
Greg Smith	2	2	0	0	2	0	0	1	0	0	7
Alex Smith	0	0	1	1	0	1	1	0	1	1	6

=== Final ===
Sunday, February 13, 1:00 pm

Sheet 4	1	2	3	4	5	6	7	8	9	10	Final
Nathan Young	0	0	2	0	3	0	0	2	1	X	8
Greg Smith	0	0	0	2	0	0	2	0	0	X	4

2022 Newfoundland & Labrador Tankard
(Newfoundland and Labrador)
Nathan Young
1st Newfoundland & Labrador Provincial Championship title
