= 2021 Newfoundland and Labrador Tankard =

- Host city: St. John's, Newfoundland and Labrador
- Arena: RE/MAX Centre
- Dates: January 27–31
- Winner: Team Smith
- Curling club: RE/MAX Centre, St. John's
- Skip: Greg Smith
- Third: Greg Blyde
- Second: Alex McDonah
- Lead: Evan McDonah
- Coach: Leslie Anne Walsh
- Finalist: Colin Thomas

The 2021 Newfoundland and Labrador Tankard, the men's provincial curling championship for Newfoundland and Labrador, was held from January 27 to 31 at the RE/MAX Centre in St. John's, Newfoundland and Labrador. The winning Greg Smith rink represented Newfoundland and Labrador at the 2021 Tim Hortons Brier, Canada's national men's curling championship in Calgary, Alberta. The event was held in conjunction with the 2021 Newfoundland and Labrador Scotties Tournament of Hearts, the provincial women's championship.

The 2021 Tankard was one of the few provincial curling championships to be held in 2021 due to the COVID-19 pandemic in Canada. While most provincial championships were cancelled, both the Newfoundland and Labrador men's and women's provincials were given the green light by the provincial government and chief medial officer.

In the final, Greg Smith won his second tankard by defeating Colin Thomas 9–8 in a double extra end.

== Teams ==
The teams are listed as follows:

Skip	Third	Second	Lead	Alternate	Club
Ryan McNeil Lamswood	Joel Krats	James Trickett	Nathan King		RE/MAX Centre, St. John's
Simon Perry	Nick Codner	Carter Holden	Evan Scott		RE/MAX Centre, St. John's
Keith Ryan	Mike Ryan	Barry Edwards	Dennis Langdon		Carol Curling Club, Labrador City
Trent Skanes	Cory Schuh	Adam Boland	Spencer Wicks	Mike Day	RE/MAX Centre, St. John's
Greg Smith	Greg Blyde	Alex McDonah	Evan McDonah		RE/MAX Centre, St. John's
Andrew Symonds	Chris Ford	Daniel Bruce	Keith Jewer		RE/MAX Centre, St. John's
Colin Thomas	Stephen Trickett	Zach Young	Michael Mosher		RE/MAX Centre, St. John's
Nathan Young	Sam Follett	Nathan Locke	Ben Stringer		RE/MAX Centre, St. John's

== Round Robin Standings ==
Final Round Robin Standings

Key
Teams to Playoffs
Teams to Tiebreakers

Skip	W	L
Greg Smith	6	1
Ryan McNeil Lamswood	6	1
Colin Thomas	5	2
Andrew Symonds	5	2
Nathan Young	3	4
Trent Skanes	2	5
Keith Ryan	1	6
Simon Perry	0	7

== Round Robin Results ==
All draws are listed in Newfoundland Time (UTC−03:30).

=== Draw 1 ===
Wednesday, January 27, 2:00 pm

Sheet 3	1	2	3	4	5	6	7	8	9	10	Final
Colin Thomas	0	2	0	1	1	1	0	0	1	0	6
Greg Smith	1	0	1	0	0	0	1	1	0	3	7

Sheet 4	1	2	3	4	5	6	7	8	9	10	Final
Ryan McNeil Lamswood	0	0	2	0	1	0	0	2	1	X	6
Trent Skanes	0	1	0	1	0	0	0	0	0	X	2

Sheet 5	1	2	3	4	5	6	7	8	9	10	Final
Andrew Symonds	0	0	0	3	1	4	4	X	X	X	12
Nathan Young	0	1	1	0	0	0	0	X	X	X	2

Sheet 6	1	2	3	4	5	6	7	8	9	10	Final
Keith Ryan	0	1	0	1	1	0	2	2	X	X	7
Simon Perry	0	0	2	0	0	0	0	0	X	X	2

=== Draw 2 ===
Wednesday, January 27, 7:00 pm

Sheet 3	1	2	3	4	5	6	7	8	9	10	Final
Andrew Symonds	0	0	0	2	0	0	1	1	0	2	6
Trent Skanes	0	1	1	0	0	1	0	0	2	0	5

Sheet 4	1	2	3	4	5	6	7	8	9	10	Final
Keith Ryan	1	0	2	0	2	0	0	0	X	X	5
Greg Smith	0	2	0	2	0	2	1	3	X	X	10

Sheet 5	1	2	3	4	5	6	7	8	9	10	Final
Colin Thomas	0	0	1	0	0	5	3	X	X	X	9
Simon Perry	0	0	0	0	1	0	0	X	X	X	1

Sheet 6	1	2	3	4	5	6	7	8	9	10	Final
Ryan McNeil Lamswood	0	1	0	0	1	0	0	2	0	1	5
Nathan Young	0	0	0	1	0	2	0	0	1	0	4

=== Draw 3 ===
Thursday, January 28, 2:00 pm

Sheet 3	1	2	3	4	5	6	7	8	9	10	Final
Keith Ryan	0	0	0	0	2	0	X	X	X	X	2
Ryan McNeil Lamswood	0	3	1	1	0	3	X	X	X	X	8

Sheet 4	1	2	3	4	5	6	7	8	9	10	Final
Simon Perry	0	0	0	0	0	1	0	0	0	X	1
Nathan Young	0	0	2	0	1	0	0	0	2	X	5

Sheet 5	1	2	3	4	5	6	7	8	9	10	Final
Greg Smith	1	0	3	1	0	0	2	0	2	2	11
Trent Skanes	0	3	0	0	1	1	0	1	0	0	6

Sheet 6	1	2	3	4	5	6	7	8	9	10	Final
Colin Thomas	0	3	0	3	0	1	2	X	X	X	9
Andrew Symonds	2	0	1	0	0	0	0	X	X	X	3

=== Draw 4 ===
Thursday, January 28, 7:00 pm

Sheet 3	1	2	3	4	5	6	7	8	9	10	Final
Trent Skanes	0	0	0	2	1	0	0	1	0	0	4
Nathan Young	0	1	1	0	0	1	0	0	2	1	6

Sheet 4	1	2	3	4	5	6	7	8	9	10	Final
Andrew Symonds	0	0	1	0	0	2	0	0	1	0	4
Ryan McNeil Lamswood	1	0	0	0	1	0	3	0	0	1	6

Sheet 5	1	2	3	4	5	6	7	8	9	10	Final
Keith Ryan	0	2	0	1	0	1	X	X	X	X	4
Colin Thomas	4	0	4	0	1	0	X	X	X	X	9

Sheet 6	1	2	3	4	5	6	7	8	9	10	Final
Simon Perry	1	0	0	1	0	0	0	X	X	X	2
Greg Smith	0	2	2	0	1	0	3	X	X	X	8

=== Draw 5 ===
Friday, January 29, 2:00 pm

Sheet 3	1	2	3	4	5	6	7	8	9	10	Final
Ryan McNeil Lamswood	0	0	1	0	2	0	2	0	0	1	6
Colin Thomas	0	0	0	1	0	2	0	1	1	0	5

Sheet 4	1	2	3	4	5	6	7	8	9	10	Final
Trent Skanes	2	1	1	0	1	0	0	1	0	X	6
Simon Perry	0	0	0	1	0	0	1	0	2	X	4

Sheet 5	1	2	3	4	5	6	7	8	9	10	Final
Nathan Young	0	0	1	0	0	1	1	0	1	0	4
Greg Smith	0	0	0	2	1	0	0	1	0	1	5

Sheet 6	1	2	3	4	5	6	7	8	9	10	11	Final
Andrew Symonds	2	0	0	2	0	0	1	0	4	0	1	10
Keith Ryan	0	1	1	0	2	2	0	1	0	2	0	9

=== Draw 6 ===
Friday, January 29, 7:00 pm

Sheet 3	1	2	3	4	5	6	7	8	9	10	Final
Nathan Young	0	1	1	0	0	2	3	1	X	X	8
Keith Ryan	1	0	0	2	0	0	0	0	X	X	3

Sheet 4	1	2	3	4	5	6	7	8	9	10	Final
Greg Smith	0	1	0	0	0	X	X	X	X	X	1
Andrew Symonds	3	0	0	3	2	X	X	X	X	X	8

Sheet 5	1	2	3	4	5	6	7	8	9	10	Final
Simon Perry	0	1	0	2	0	0	0	1	X	X	4
Ryan McNeil Lamswood	0	0	3	0	2	3	0	0	X	X	8

Sheet 6	1	2	3	4	5	6	7	8	9	10	Final
Trent Skanes	1	0	0	2	0	0	0	0	X	X	3
Colin Thomas	0	2	0	0	2	1	2	1	X	X	8

=== Draw 7 ===
Saturday, January 30, 9:00 am

Sheet 3	1	2	3	4	5	6	7	8	9	10	Final
Simon Perry	0	0	0	0	1	0	1	0	X	X	2
Andrew Symonds	1	2	2	1	0	0	0	1	X	X	7

Sheet 4	1	2	3	4	5	6	7	8	9	10	11	Final
Nathan Young	0	0	0	0	0	2	1	0	0	1	0	4
Colin Thomas	0	0	1	0	1	0	0	2	0	0	1	5

Sheet 5	1	2	3	4	5	6	7	8	9	10	Final
Trent Skanes	X	X	X	X	X	X	X	X	X	X	W
Keith Ryan	X	X	X	X	X	X	X	X	X	X	L

Note: Team Ryan forfeited the match.

Sheet 6	1	2	3	4	5	6	7	8	9	10	Final
Greg Smith	1	0	2	1	1	3	X	X	X	X	8
Ryan McNeil Lamswood	0	1	0	0	0	0	X	X	X	X	1

== Tiebreaker ==
Saturday, January 30, 2:30 pm

Sheet 5	1	2	3	4	5	6	7	8	9	10	Final
Colin Thomas	0	0	0	1	0	1	0	2	1	1	6
Andrew Symonds	0	1	1	0	1	0	1	0	0	0	4

== Playoffs ==
Semifinal			Final
			1	Greg Smith	9
2	Ryan McNeil Lamswood	3	3	Colin Thomas	8
3	Colin Thomas	8

=== Semifinal ===
Saturday, January 30, 7:30 pm

Sheet 4	1	2	3	4	5	6	7	8	9	10	Final
Ryan McNeil Lamswood	0	0	0	0	1	0	0	2	0	0	3
Colin Thomas	0	0	0	1	0	1	1	0	2	3	8

=== Final ===
Sunday, January 31, 1:00 pm

Sheet 4	1	2	3	4	5	6	7	8	9	10	11	12	Final
Greg Smith	0	0	2	0	0	2	0	2	0	2	0	1	9
Colin Thomas	0	1	0	0	2	0	4	0	1	0	0	0	8

2021 Newfoundland & Labrador Tankard
(Newfoundland and Labrador)
Greg Smith
2nd Newfoundland & Labrador Provincial Championship title
