= 2025 Montana's Brier =

Canada's men's curling championship

- Host city: Kelowna, British Columbia
- Arena: Prospera Place
- Dates: February 28 – March 9
- Attendance: 89,108
- Winner: Alberta (Jacobs)
- Curling club: The Glencoe Club, Calgary
- Skip: Brad Jacobs
- Third: Marc Kennedy
- Second: Brett Gallant
- Lead: Ben Hebert
- Alternate: Mike Caione
- Coach: Paul Webster
- Finalist: Manitoba (Dunstone)

The 2025 Montana's Brier, Canada's national men's curling championship, was held from February 28 to March 9 at Prospera Place in Kelowna, British Columbia. The winning Brad Jacobs rink will represent Canada at the 2025 World Men's Curling Championship at Temple Gardens Centre in Moose Jaw, Saskatchewan.

== Summary ==
Prior to the event, all the teams agreed not to use the new controversial 'black foam' brush heads, that are legal for competition. The new brush heads have firmer foam, which has caused debate among curlers, with the ensuing controversy being dubbed "Broomgate 2.0" or "foamgate", in reference to the brush head scandal from the 2015–16 season.

In Draw 6, Alberta (Jacobs) defeated Northwest Territories 20–2 setting a playoff-era record (since 1980) for most points scored in a game, breaking the record of 18 set in 2022 by Manitoba. This was also the first time a team scored 20 or more points in a game at the Brier since 1968 (which was also held in Kelowna) when Manitoba defeated British Columbia 22–5.

Team Canada, skipped by Brad Gushue was the first team to clinch a playoff berth in their morning game on March 5, after defeating Alberta's Kevin Koe rink, 7–6. Later in the day, Saskatchewan's Mike McEwen and Alberta's Brad Jacobs also earned playoff spots, after wins against Saskatchewan's Rylan Kleiter and Team Ontario (Sam Mooibroek), respectively. Kevin Koe, a former World Champion was eliminated from playoff competition for the second straight season.

On March 6, Reid Carruthers of Manitoba took the last playoff spot in Pool A, which had been dubbed the "Pool of Death" due to its depth. He had the evening off, but clinched after Manitoba's Matt Dunstone beat Gushue, which earned Dunstone first place in the pool, and gave Carruthers the tiebreaker advantage over Northern Ontario's John Epping who finished with the same record, as they had beaten them in pool play. Had Gushue won, Epping would have made the playoffs instead. In Pool B, Nova Scotia's Owen Purcell earned the final playoff sport after beating Ontario. It was the first time Nova Scotia made the playoffs since 2006.

In the 1/2 playoff qualifier games, Team Manitoba–Dunstone took on Saskatchewan–McEwen, while Alberta–Jacobs took on Team Canada, skipped by Brad Gushue. Dunstone beat McEwen 6–5, sending his team to the 1 vs. 2 page playoff game, and relegating McEwen to play Manitoba–Carruthers in the 3/4 qualifier game. Meanwhile, Gushue defeated Jacobs 7–4 in the other 1/2 game, in the "battle of the Brads", putting Team Canada in the 1 vs. 2 page playoff, and sending Jacobs into the 3/4 game against Nova Scotia's Owen Purcell rink. In the Gushue–Jacobs game, Jacobs missed an in-off in the seventh which could have resulted in multiple points, but instead resulted in a Gushue steal. It was Team Jacobs' first loss in the event.

In the 3/4 games, Team Carruthers sent McEwen packing, defeating them 6–4, while Jacobs sent Team Nova Scotia home, beating them 10–6. The turning point in the McEwen–Carruthers game came in the sixth end, when McEwen attempted a double takeout for three. He hit the first Carruthers rock too thin, resulting in a steal of two instead, an error McEwen later called "catastrophic", and a "monumental error in reading angles", as the shot for three may not have even been possible. The wins put Carruthers and Jacobs into the 3 vs. 4 page playoff game.

In the page 3 vs. 4 game, Jacobs defeated Carruthers, 6–5. Carruthers blamed his loss on a few "half shots". Meanwhile, in the page 1 vs. 2 game, Dunstone beat Team Canada 7–4. Team Canada skip Brad Gushue blamed his defeat on an "ad hoc" strategy, failing to "build many ends". The win put Jacobs into the semifinal to face Gushue, while Dunstone earned a bye into the final with his team's win. Carruthers was eliminated.

In the semifinal, Team Jacobs beat Canada's Brad Gushue rink 7–5. Jacobs took a 3–1 lead in the fifth when they scored three after Gushue ticked a guard on his first, and missed a hit and roll attempt on his last. This allowed Jacobs to make a hit for the three points. Gushue came back with a three-ender of his own in the eighth when he made a double takeout on his last stone of the end to take a 5–4 lead. Jacobs responded by making a hit for two in the ninth to take a 6–5 lead into the last end. The game came down to the last shots, with both teams facing time-clock pressure. On his last, Jacobs made a draw to the four-foot behind a guard to sit shot. To win, Gushue had to tap the rock back to score two points. On his final shot, Gushue threw the rock heavy, only grazing the Jacobs rock, giving up a steal and the game. The crowd gasped after the miss by the six-time Brier champion who was looking for his fourth straight championship. The win put Jacobs into the Brier final for the first time in 10 years.

In the final, Team Jacobs took on Team Dunstone in front of a sellout crowd of 5,483. Team Dunstone started with hammer, and blanked the first four ends. In the fifth, Jacobs missed a cross-house double which was followed up by Dunstone drawing for two to take a 2–0 lead. In the sixth end, Dunstone made a tapback to sit two, forcing Jacobs to draw for a single. In the seventh, Dunstone jammed on a double attempt which gave Jacobs a steal to tie the game at two. The teams then blanked the eighth. In the ninth end, Dunstone flashed on his first shot, and would be forced to take a single point, to take a 3–2 lead into the final end. In the 10th end, Team Dunstone tried to bunch up stones around the button in an attempt to force Jacobs to just one, but Team Jacobs made eight perfect shots in the end. On his first Jacobs made a soft tap to sit four, which Dunstone replied by making a freeze to hold Jacobs to sit just one. On Jacob's final stone, he picked out the frozen Dunstone rock to score three, and with it the Brier championship. It was Jacobs' first Brier title since 2013, the fourth Brier championship for third Marc Kennedy, and the fifth title for second Brett Gallant and lead Ben Hebert. It was the first time in Brier history that a team won four straight elimination games to win the event.

== Teams ==
A total of eighteen teams qualified for the 2025 Brier. The fourteen Canadian curling member associations held playdowns to determine who represented their province or territory. Team Canada was represented by Team Brad Gushue, who won the 2024 Montana's Brier.

In a slight change in the qualification format from 2024, three teams in the field pre-qualified for the 2025 Brier based on their 2023–24 Canadian Team Ranking Standings, which meant they bypassed the provincial qualifiers. These spots went to Teams Brad Jacobs, Mike McEwen and Matt Dunstone. This was different from the 2024 qualification where two teams pre-qualified for the event with the final spot going to the highest ranked team on the CTRS standings following the conclusion of the provincial championships.

The teams were as follows:

Canada	Alberta (Koe)	British Columbia
St. John's CC, St. John's Skip: Brad Gushue; Third: Mark Nichols (Note: For the last three ends of Draw 15, Team Canada's alternate Adam Casey threw second stones, second Brendan Bottcher threw third stones and third Mark Nichols sat out.); Second: Brendan Bottcher; Lead: Geoff Walker; Alternate: Adam Casey	The Glencoe Club, Calgary (Note: For the last two ends of Draw 9, Team Alberta skip Kevin Koe removed himself from the game with the rest of the team moving up the lineup one position. Alternate Mike Libbus threw lead rocks and skipped the game.) Skip: Kevin Koe; Third: Aaron Sluchinski; Second: Tyler Tardi; Lead: Karrick Martin; Alternate: Mike Libbus	Victoria CC, Victoria Skip: Cameron de Jong; Third: Alex Horvath; Second: Corey Chester; Lead: Brayden Carpenter (Note: Team British Columbia's alternate Paul Cseke threw lead stones for the last end of Draw 11.); Alternate: Paul Cseke
Manitoba (Carruthers)	New Brunswick	Newfoundland and Labrador
Granite CC, Winnipeg Skip: Reid Carruthers; Third: B.J. Neufeld; Second: Catlin Schneider (Note: Team Manitoba (Carruthers)'s alternate Kyle Doering threw second stones for the last three ends of Draws 3 and 13.); Lead: Connor Njegovan; Alternate: Kyle Doering	Gage G&CC, Oromocto Skip: James Grattan; Third: Joel Krats; Second: Paul Dobson (Note: For the last two ends of Draw 11, Team New Brunswick's alternate Drew Grattan threw lead stones, lead Andy McCann threw second stones and second Paul Dobson sat out.); Lead: Andy McCann; Alternate: Drew Grattan	St. John's CC, St. John's Skip: Ty Dilello; Third: Ryan McNeil Lamswood; Second: Daniel Bruce; Lead: Aaron Feltham (Note: Team Newfoundland and Labrador's alternate Nathan King threw lead stones for the last three ends of Draw 3.); Alternate: Nathan King
Northern Ontario	Nova Scotia	Ontario
Northern Credit Union CC, Sudbury Skip: John Epping; Third: Jacob Horgan; Second: Tanner Horgan; Lead: Ian McMillan	Halifax CC, Halifax Skip: Owen Purcell; Third: Luke Saunders; Second: Scott Saccary; Lead: Ryan Abraham; Alternate: Calan MacIsaac	Whitby CC, Whitby Skip: Sam Mooibroek; Third: Ryan Wiebe; Second: Scott Mitchell; Lead: Nathan Steele (Note: Team Ontario's alternate Gavin Lydiate threw lead stones for the last three ends of Draw 4.); Alternate: Gavin Lydiate
Prince Edward Island	Quebec	Saskatchewan (Kleiter)
Crapaud Community CC, Crapaud Skip: Tyler Smith; Third: Adams Cocks; Second: Christopher Gallant; Lead: Ed White	Glenmore CC, Dollard-des-Ormeaux, Curling des Collines, Chelsea, CC Etchemin, Saint-Romuald & CC Valleyfield, Salaberry-de-Valleyfield Fourth: Félix Asselin; Skip: Jean-Michel Ménard; Second: Martin Crête; Lead: Jean-François Trépanier	Nutana CC, Saskatoon Skip: Rylan Kleiter; Third: Joshua Mattern; Second: Matthew Hall; Lead: Trevor Johnson (Note: Team Saskatchewan (Kleiter)'s alternate John Mattern threw lead stones for the last end of Draw 8.); Alternate: John Mattern
Northwest Territories	Nunavut	Yukon
Hay River CC, Hay River Skip: Aaron Bartling; Third: D'arcy Delorey; Second: Norman Bassett (Note: Team Northwest Territories used a front-end rotation.); Lead: Eric Preston; Alternate: Adam Naugler	Iqaluit CC, Iqaluit Skip: Shane Latimer; Third: Sheldon Wettig; Second: Justin McDonell; Lead: Peter Van Strien	Whitehorse CC, Whitehorse Skip: Thomas Scoffin; Third: Kerr Drummond; Second: Trygg Jensen; Lead: Joe Wallingham
Alberta (Jacobs)	Saskatchewan (McEwen)	Manitoba (Dunstone)
The Glencoe Club, Calgary Skip: Brad Jacobs; Third: Marc Kennedy; Second: Brett Gallant; Lead: Ben Hebert; Alternate: Mike Caione	Nutana CC, Saskatoon Skip: Mike McEwen; Third: Colton Flasch (Note: For the last three ends of Draw 12, Team Saskatchewan (McEwen)'s alternate Brent Laing threw second stones, second Kevin Marsh threw third stones and third Colton Flasch sat out.); Second: Kevin Marsh; Lead: Dan Marsh; Alternate: Brent Laing	Fort Rouge CC, Winnipeg Skip: Matt Dunstone; Third: Colton Lott; Second: E.J. Harnden; Lead: Ryan Harnden (Note: Team Manitoba (Dunstone)'s alternate Adam Kingsbury threw lead stones for the last end of Draw 3.); Alternate: Adam Kingsbury

=== CTRS Rankings ===
As of February 10, 2025

Member Association (Skip)	Rank	Points
Manitoba (Dunstone)	1	314.375
Alberta (Jacobs)	2	284.250
Saskatchewan (McEwen)	3	281.500
Canada (Gushue)	4	253.250
Northern Ontario (Epping)	5	228.250
Saskatchewan (Kleiter)	6	142.000
Ontario (Mooibroek)	8	130.750
Alberta (Koe)	9	119.813
Manitoba (Carruthers)	10	113.125
Quebec (Ménard)	20	70.438
Nova Scotia (Purcell)	21	68.063
British Columbia (de Jong)	26	45.750
New Brunswick (Grattan)	53	24.500
Prince Edward Island (Smith)	55	23.750
Yukon (Scoffin)	83	9.938
Newfoundland and Labrador (Dilello)	93	8.250
Northwest Territories (Bartling)	NR	0.000
Nunavut (Latimer)	NR	0.000

== Map of teams ==
Team Canada Pre-Qualified Teams Provincial Winners
Provincial winners that are in the same location as Team Canada or the Pre-Qualified teams are listed at the bottom

== Round robin standings ==
Final Round Robin Standings

Key
Teams to Championship round

Pool A	Skip	W	L	W–L	PF	PA	EW	EL	BE	SE	S%	LSD
Manitoba (Dunstone)	Matt Dunstone	7	1	1–0	62	35	34	26	7	10	89%	214.9
Canada	Brad Gushue	7	1	0–1	60	32	33	25	8	7	90%	191.9
Manitoba (Carruthers)	Reid Carruthers	6	2	1–0	55	39	35	27	8	8	86%	404.9
Northern Ontario	John Epping	6	2	0–1	65	47	36	33	5	9	86%	165.0
Alberta (Koe)	Kevin Koe	4	4	–	50	39	32	25	9	12	86%	249.3
New Brunswick	James Grattan	3	5	–	40	52	32	31	5	8	82%	389.4
British Columbia	Cameron de Jong	2	6	–	46	47	30	32	4	8	83%	392.2
Newfoundland and Labrador	Ty Dilello	1	7	–	32	61	23	37	7	6	80%	794.5
Nunavut	Shane Latimer	0	8	–	25	83	22	41	1	3	68%	1146.0

Pool B	Skip	W	L	W–L	PF	PA	EW	EL	BE	SE	S%	LSD
Alberta (Jacobs)	Brad Jacobs	8	0	–	79	29	37	24	5	11	92%	153.8
Saskatchewan (McEwen)	Mike McEwen	7	1	–	65	36	33	27	11	8	89%	121.7
Nova Scotia	Owen Purcell	5	3	–	52	43	34	25	12	7	85%	274.3
Ontario	Sam Mooibroek	4	4	2–0	56	48	32	29	3	9	82%	254.8
Quebec	Jean-Michel Ménard	4	4	1–1	49	56	31	32	4	5	86%	357.9
Yukon	Thomas Scoffin	4	4	0–2	45	51	31	32	5	8	80%	825.6
Saskatchewan (Kleiter)	Rylan Kleiter	3	5	–	42	46	26	26	7	7	85%	524.2
Prince Edward Island	Tyler Smith	1	7	–	41	61	27	37	0	5	82%	365.3
Northwest Territories	Aaron Bartling	0	8	–	27	86	22	41	4	3	76%	851.7

Pool A Round Robin Summary Table
Pos.	Team	(Alberta) AB–K	(British Columbia) BC	(Canada) CAN	(Manitoba) MB-C	(Manitoba) MB-D	(New Brunswick) NB	(Newfoundland and Labrador) NL	(Northern Ontario) NO	(Nunavut) NU	Record
5	Alberta (Koe)	—	8–5	6–7	4–5	2–6	10–4	5–1	5–9	10–2	4–4
7	British Columbia	5–8	—	3–5	5–6	4–7	5–7	8–3	6–8	10–3	2–6
2	Canada	7–6	5–3	—	7–3	6–7	8–3	9–2	6–5	12–3	7–1
3	Manitoba (Carruthers)	5–4	6–5	3–7	—	6–8	6–4	14–2	8–6	7–3	6–2
1	Manitoba (Dunstone)	6–2	7–4	7–6	8–6	—	9–3	5–4	7–8	13–2	7–1
6	New Brunswick	4–10	7–5	3–8	4–6	3–9	—	5–4	6–7	8–3	3–5
8	Newfoundland and Labrador	1–5	3–8	2–9	2–14	4–5	4–5	—	6–9	10–6	1–7
4	Northern Ontario	9–5	8–6	5–6	6–8	8–7	7–6	9–6	—	13–3	6–2
9	Nunavut	2–10	3–10	3–12	3–7	2–13	3–8	6–10	3–13	—	0–8

Pool B Round Robin Summary Table
Pos.	Team	(Alberta) AB–J	(Northwest Territories) NT	(Nova Scotia) NS	(Ontario) ON	(Prince Edward Island) PE	(Quebec) QC	(Saskatchewan) SK–K	(Saskatchewan) SK–M	(Yukon) YT	Record
1	Alberta (Jacobs)	—	20–2	7–3	11–5	10–3	6–4	6–3	9–6	10–3	8–0
9	Northwest Territories	2–20	—	4–7	2–12	5–10	8–9	2–8	2–14	2–6	0–8
3	Nova Scotia	3–7	7–4	—	7–3	10–6	7–6	7–2	6–8	5–7	5–3
4	Ontario	5–11	12–2	3–7	—	8–4	11–4	4–9	4–8	9–3	4–4
8	Prince Edward Island	3–10	10–5	6–10	4–8	—	5–7	4–7	4–6	5–8	1–7
5	Quebec	4–6	9–8	6–7	4–11	7–5	—	8–5	4–9	7–5	4–4
7	Saskatchewan (Kleiter)	3–6	8–2	2–7	9–4	7–4	5–8	—	2–7	6–8	3–5
2	Saskatchewan (McEwen)	6–9	14–2	8–6	8–4	6–4	9–4	7–2	—	7–5	7–1
6	Yukon	3–10	6–2	7–5	3–9	8–5	5–7	8–6	5–7	—	4–4

== Round robin results ==
All draw times are listed in Pacific Time (UTC−08:00).

=== Draw 1 ===
Friday, February 28, 6:30 pm

Sheet A	1	2	3	4	5	6	7	8	9	10	Final
Manitoba (Carruthers) 🔨	0	1	3	0	0	0	0	1	0	1	6
British Columbia (de Jong)	0	0	0	2	0	1	1	0	1	0	5

Sheet B	1	2	3	4	5	6	7	8	9	10	Final
Canada (Gushue) 🔨	2	0	1	2	0	1	3	0	X	X	9
Newfoundland and Labrador (Dilello)	0	0	0	0	1	0	0	1	X	X	2

Sheet C	1	2	3	4	5	6	7	8	9	10	11	Final
Northern Ontario (Epping) 🔨	1	0	0	3	0	0	0	2	0	0	1	7
New Brunswick (Grattan)	0	1	1	0	0	2	0	0	1	1	0	6

Sheet D	1	2	3	4	5	6	7	8	9	10	Final
Alberta (Koe) 🔨	0	0	0	0	0	0	1	1	0	X	2
Manitoba (Dunstone)	0	0	1	0	0	2	0	0	3	X	6

=== Draw 2 ===
Saturday, March 1, 1:30 pm

Sheet A	1	2	3	4	5	6	7	8	9	10	Final
Prince Edward Island (Smith)	0	0	0	2	0	1	0	0	1	0	4
Saskatchewan (McEwen) 🔨	0	1	2	0	3	0	0	0	0	0	6

Sheet B	1	2	3	4	5	6	7	8	9	10	Final
Nova Scotia (Purcell) 🔨	0	0	0	0	3	0	0	0	2	2	7
Saskatchewan (Kleiter)	0	0	0	1	0	0	1	0	0	0	2

Sheet C	1	2	3	4	5	6	7	8	9	10	Final
Yukon (Scoffin)	0	0	2	0	0	0	0	1	X	X	3
Alberta (Jacobs) 🔨	0	2	0	2	1	1	4	0	X	X	10

Sheet D	1	2	3	4	5	6	7	8	9	10	Final
Quebec (Ménard)	0	0	1	0	0	2	0	1	X	X	4
Ontario (Mooibroek) 🔨	0	5	0	3	2	0	1	0	X	X	11

=== Draw 3 ===
Saturday, March 1, 6:30 pm

Sheet A	1	2	3	4	5	6	7	8	9	10	Final
Manitoba (Dunstone) 🔨	2	1	0	2	4	0	3	1	X	X	13
Nunavut (Latimer)	0	0	1	0	0	1	0	0	X	X	2

Sheet B	1	2	3	4	5	6	7	8	9	10	Final
Northern Ontario (Epping) 🔨	0	0	2	0	3	0	0	1	1	2	9
Alberta (Koe)	0	0	0	2	0	2	1	0	0	0	5

Sheet C	1	2	3	4	5	6	7	8	9	10	Final
Canada (Gushue) 🔨	0	1	0	1	0	2	0	1	0	X	5
British Columbia (de Jong)	0	0	0	0	1	0	2	0	0	X	3

Sheet D	1	2	3	4	5	6	7	8	9	10	Final
Newfoundland and Labrador (Dilello)	0	0	0	0	2	0	0	0	X	X	2
Manitoba (Carruthers) 🔨	1	4	2	2	0	0	4	1	X	X	14

=== Draw 4 ===
Sunday, March 2, 8:30 am

Sheet A	1	2	3	4	5	6	7	8	9	10	Final
Ontario (Mooibroek) 🔨	1	3	1	4	0	2	0	1	X	X	12
Northwest Territories (Bartling)	0	0	0	0	1	0	1	0	X	X	2

Sheet B	1	2	3	4	5	6	7	8	9	10	Final
Yukon (Scoffin) 🔨	0	2	0	1	1	0	0	1	0	0	5
Quebec (Ménard)	0	0	2	0	0	3	1	0	0	1	7

Sheet C	1	2	3	4	5	6	7	8	9	10	Final
Nova Scotia (Purcell) 🔨	1	0	0	1	1	0	1	0	2	X	6
Saskatchewan (McEwen)	0	1	3	0	0	3	0	1	0	X	8

Sheet D	1	2	3	4	5	6	7	8	9	10	Final
Saskatchewan (Kleiter) 🔨	2	0	0	1	0	1	2	0	1	X	7
Prince Edward Island (Smith)	0	1	0	0	1	0	0	2	0	X	4

=== Draw 5 ===
Sunday, March 2, 1:30 pm

Sheet A	1	2	3	4	5	6	7	8	9	10	Final
Canada (Gushue) 🔨	0	0	1	0	2	0	2	0	0	1	6
Northern Ontario (Epping)	0	0	0	2	0	2	0	0	1	0	5

Sheet B	1	2	3	4	5	6	7	8	9	10	Final
British Columbia (de Jong)	0	2	0	0	1	0	1	0	0	X	4
Manitoba (Dunstone) 🔨	3	0	0	2	0	0	0	0	2	X	7

Sheet C	1	2	3	4	5	6	7	8	9	10	11	Final
Alberta (Koe)	0	1	0	0	1	0	0	1	0	1	0	4
Manitoba (Carruthers) 🔨	1	0	2	0	0	0	1	0	0	0	1	5

Sheet D	1	2	3	4	5	6	7	8	9	10	Final
New Brunswick (Grattan) 🔨	1	0	0	0	0	0	2	4	1	X	8
Nunavut (Latimer)	0	1	0	1	0	1	0	0	0	X	3

=== Draw 6 ===
Sunday, March 2, 6:30 pm

Sheet A	1	2	3	4	5	6	7	8	9	10	Final
Nova Scotia (Purcell) 🔨	0	0	1	0	0	2	0	1	0	1	5
Yukon (Scoffin)	1	0	0	1	2	0	1	0	2	0	7

Sheet B	1	2	3	4	5	6	7	8	9	10	Final
Saskatchewan (McEwen) 🔨	0	1	0	2	0	2	1	0	2	X	8
Ontario (Mooibroek)	0	0	1	0	2	0	0	1	0	X	4

Sheet C	1	2	3	4	5	6	7	8	9	10	Final
Quebec (Ménard) 🔨	2	1	0	2	0	0	0	2	0	X	7
Prince Edward Island (Smith)	0	0	1	0	2	1	0	0	1	X	5

Sheet D	1	2	3	4	5	6	7	8	9	10	Final
Alberta (Jacobs) 🔨	3	0	4	5	1	2	0	5	X	X	20
Northwest Territories (Bartling)	0	1	0	0	0	0	1	0	X	X	2

=== Draw 7 ===
Monday, March 3, 8:30 am

Sheet A	1	2	3	4	5	6	7	8	9	10	Final
British Columbia (de Jong) 🔨	0	3	0	0	1	0	0	1	0	X	5
Alberta (Koe)	0	0	2	2	0	2	1	0	1	X	8

Sheet B	1	2	3	4	5	6	7	8	9	10	Final
Manitoba (Carruthers)	0	0	1	0	2	0	2	0	1	X	6
New Brunswick (Grattan) 🔨	1	0	0	1	0	1	0	1	0	X	4

Sheet C	1	2	3	4	5	6	7	8	9	10	Final
Nunavut (Latimer) 🔨	1	0	1	0	1	0	0	3	0	0	6
Newfoundland and Labrador (Dilello)	0	2	0	1	0	1	1	0	3	2	10

Sheet D	1	2	3	4	5	6	7	8	9	10	Final
Manitoba (Dunstone)	1	0	0	2	0	2	0	1	1	0	7
Northern Ontario (Epping) 🔨	0	2	0	0	3	0	1	0	0	2	8

=== Draw 8 ===
Monday, March 3, 1:30 pm

Sheet A	1	2	3	4	5	6	7	8	9	10	Final
Saskatchewan (McEwen) 🔨	0	0	3	0	2	0	3	1	X	X	9
Quebec (Ménard)	0	1	0	1	0	2	0	0	X	X	4

Sheet B	1	2	3	4	5	6	7	8	9	10	Final
Prince Edward Island (Smith)	0	1	0	1	0	0	0	1	X	X	3
Alberta (Jacobs) 🔨	2	0	2	0	1	2	3	0	X	X	10

Sheet C	1	2	3	4	5	6	7	8	9	10	Final
Northwest Territories (Bartling)	0	0	0	0	1	0	1	0	0	X	2
Saskatchewan (Kleiter) 🔨	0	2	0	3	0	2	0	0	1	X	8

Sheet D	1	2	3	4	5	6	7	8	9	10	Final
Ontario (Mooibroek) 🔨	1	0	2	2	0	1	0	3	X	X	9
Yukon (Scoffin)	0	1	0	0	1	0	1	0	X	X	3

=== Draw 9 ===
Monday, March 3, 6:30 pm

Sheet A	1	2	3	4	5	6	7	8	9	10	11	Final
Newfoundland and Labrador (Dilello)	0	1	0	0	0	1	0	1	1	0	0	4
New Brunswick (Grattan) 🔨	1	0	0	2	0	0	0	0	0	1	1	5

Sheet B	1	2	3	4	5	6	7	8	9	10	Final
Alberta (Koe) 🔨	2	0	3	3	0	1	0	1	X	X	10
Nunavut (Latimer)	0	0	0	0	1	0	1	0	X	X	2

Sheet C	1	2	3	4	5	6	7	8	9	10	Final
British Columbia (de Jong) 🔨	0	2	1	0	1	0	1	0	1	0	6
Northern Ontario (Epping)	1	0	0	1	0	2	0	3	0	1	8

Sheet D	1	2	3	4	5	6	7	8	9	10	Final
Manitoba (Carruthers)	0	0	1	0	1	0	0	1	X	X	3
Canada (Gushue) 🔨	0	2	0	2	0	0	3	0	X	X	7

=== Draw 10 ===
Tuesday, March 4, 8:30 am

Sheet A	1	2	3	4	5	6	7	8	9	10	Final
Saskatchewan (Kleiter)	0	0	0	0	1	0	2	0	0	X	3
Alberta (Jacobs) 🔨	0	0	2	0	0	2	0	1	1	X	6

Sheet B	1	2	3	4	5	6	7	8	9	10	Final
Quebec (Ménard) 🔨	1	0	2	0	0	2	0	1	0	3	9
Northwest Territories (Bartling)	0	1	0	1	1	0	3	0	2	0	8

Sheet C	1	2	3	4	5	6	7	8	9	10	Final
Saskatchewan (McEwen) 🔨	2	1	0	1	0	1	0	2	0	X	7
Yukon (Scoffin)	0	0	2	0	2	0	1	0	0	X	5

Sheet D	1	2	3	4	5	6	7	8	9	10	Final
Prince Edward Island (Smith)	0	0	2	0	2	0	0	2	0	X	6
Nova Scotia (Purcell) 🔨	0	1	0	2	0	2	1	0	4	X	10

=== Draw 11 ===
Tuesday, March 4, 1:30 pm

Sheet A	1	2	3	4	5	6	7	8	9	10	Final
Northern Ontario (Epping) 🔨	0	2	0	2	0	1	0	1	0	0	6
Manitoba (Carruthers)	1	0	1	0	1	0	2	0	2	1	8

Sheet B	1	2	3	4	5	6	7	8	9	10	Final
New Brunswick (Grattan)	0	1	0	0	0	1	0	1	X	X	3
Canada (Gushue) 🔨	2	0	0	4	1	0	1	0	X	X	8

Sheet C	1	2	3	4	5	6	7	8	9	10	11	Final
Newfoundland and Labrador (Dilello) 🔨	0	0	1	0	1	0	0	1	0	1	0	4
Manitoba (Dunstone)	0	1	0	2	0	1	0	0	0	0	1	5

Sheet D	1	2	3	4	5	6	7	8	9	10	Final
Nunavut (Latimer)	0	1	0	0	1	1	0	0	X	X	3
British Columbia (de Jong) 🔨	3	0	2	2	0	0	1	2	X	X	10

=== Draw 12 ===
Tuesday, March 4, 6:30 pm

Sheet A	1	2	3	4	5	6	7	8	9	10	Final
Yukon (Scoffin)	1	0	1	0	2	0	0	0	2	2	8
Prince Edward Island (Smith) 🔨	0	2	0	1	0	1	0	1	0	0	5

Sheet B	1	2	3	4	5	6	7	8	9	10	Final
Alberta (Jacobs) 🔨	0	1	0	2	0	0	4	0	X	X	7
Nova Scotia (Purcell)	0	0	1	0	0	1	0	1	X	X	3

Sheet C	1	2	3	4	5	6	7	8	9	10	Final
Saskatchewan (Kleiter)	0	1	1	0	2	0	3	2	X	X	9
Ontario (Mooibroek) 🔨	0	0	0	2	0	2	0	0	X	X	4

Sheet D	1	2	3	4	5	6	7	8	9	10	Final
Northwest Territories (Bartling)	0	1	0	0	0	1	0	0	X	X	2
Saskatchewan (McEwen) 🔨	3	0	2	1	3	0	4	1	X	X	14

=== Draw 13 ===
Wednesday, March 5, 8:30 am

Sheet A	1	2	3	4	5	6	7	8	9	10	Final
New Brunswick (Grattan)	0	0	1	0	0	1	0	1	X	X	3
Manitoba (Dunstone) 🔨	0	2	0	2	1	0	4	0	X	X	9

Sheet B	1	2	3	4	5	6	7	8	9	10	Final
Newfoundland and Labrador (Dilello)	0	0	0	1	0	2	0	0	0	X	3
British Columbia (de Jong) 🔨	0	3	2	0	1	0	1	0	1	X	8

Sheet C	1	2	3	4	5	6	7	8	9	10	Final
Manitoba (Carruthers) 🔨	3	0	2	1	0	0	1	0	X	X	7
Nunavut (Latimer)	0	1	0	0	1	0	0	1	X	X	3

Sheet D	1	2	3	4	5	6	7	8	9	10	11	Final
Canada (Gushue)	0	0	0	2	0	2	0	0	2	0	1	7
Alberta (Koe) 🔨	0	1	0	0	2	0	0	1	0	2	0	6

=== Draw 14 ===
Wednesday, March 5, 1:30 pm

Sheet A	1	2	3	4	5	6	7	8	9	10	Final
Alberta (Jacobs) 🔨	2	0	2	0	2	0	5	0	X	X	11
Ontario (Mooibroek)	0	1	0	2	0	1	0	1	X	X	5

Sheet B	1	2	3	4	5	6	7	8	9	10	Final
Saskatchewan (Kleiter)	0	1	0	1	0	0	0	0	X	X	2
Saskatchewan (McEwen) 🔨	0	0	2	0	0	0	0	5	X	X	7

Sheet C	1	2	3	4	5	6	7	8	9	10	Final
Prince Edward Island (Smith) 🔨	1	0	2	0	0	3	3	0	1	X	10
Northwest Territories (Bartling)	0	1	0	1	1	0	0	2	0	X	5

Sheet D	1	2	3	4	5	6	7	8	9	10	Final
Nova Scotia (Purcell) 🔨	0	0	0	1	0	2	0	3	1	0	7
Quebec (Ménard)	0	0	0	0	3	0	1	0	0	2	6

=== Draw 15 ===
Wednesday, March 5, 6:30 pm

Sheet A	1	2	3	4	5	6	7	8	9	10	Final
Nunavut (Latimer)	0	0	1	0	1	0	1	0	X	X	3
Canada (Gushue) 🔨	3	1	0	3	0	1	0	4	X	X	12

Sheet B	1	2	3	4	5	6	7	8	9	10	Final
Manitoba (Dunstone) 🔨	1	0	1	0	2	0	0	4	0	0	8
Manitoba (Carruthers)	0	2	0	2	0	1	0	0	0	1	6

Sheet C	1	2	3	4	5	6	7	8	9	10	Final
New Brunswick (Grattan) 🔨	1	0	0	1	0	2	0	0	X	X	4
Alberta (Koe)	0	1	1	0	4	0	2	2	X	X	10

Sheet D	1	2	3	4	5	6	7	8	9	10	Final
Northern Ontario (Epping) 🔨	1	3	2	0	2	1	0	0	0	X	9
Newfoundland and Labrador (Dilello)	0	0	0	2	0	0	1	3	0	X	6

=== Draw 16 ===
Thursday, March 6, 8:30 am

Sheet A	1	2	3	4	5	6	7	8	9	10	Final
Northwest Territories (Bartling)	0	1	0	0	0	1	0	2	0	X	4
Nova Scotia (Purcell) 🔨	1	0	1	1	0	0	2	0	2	X	7

Sheet B	1	2	3	4	5	6	7	8	9	10	Final
Ontario (Mooibroek) 🔨	0	1	1	1	0	3	1	1	X	X	8
Prince Edward Island (Smith)	2	0	0	0	2	0	0	0	X	X	4

Sheet C	1	2	3	4	5	6	7	8	9	10	Final
Alberta (Jacobs)	0	0	1	1	0	0	0	2	0	2	6
Quebec (Ménard) 🔨	0	1	0	0	1	1	0	0	1	0	4

Sheet D	1	2	3	4	5	6	7	8	9	10	Final
Yukon (Scoffin) 🔨	0	2	0	1	0	2	0	2	0	1	8
Saskatchewan (Kleiter)	0	0	3	0	2	0	0	0	1	0	6

=== Draw 17 ===
Thursday, March 6, 1:30 pm

Sheet A	1	2	3	4	5	6	7	8	9	10	Final
Alberta (Koe) 🔨	0	0	1	0	0	1	1	2	0	X	5
Newfoundland and Labrador (Dilello)	0	0	0	0	0	0	0	0	1	X	1

Sheet B	1	2	3	4	5	6	7	8	9	10	Final
Nunavut (Latimer)	0	0	0	1	0	0	2	0	X	X	3
Northern Ontario (Epping) 🔨	2	2	1	0	1	1	0	6	X	X	13

Sheet C	1	2	3	4	5	6	7	8	9	10	Final
Manitoba (Dunstone) 🔨	1	0	0	0	2	0	2	1	0	1	7
Canada (Gushue)	0	0	3	1	0	1	0	0	1	0	6

Sheet D	1	2	3	4	5	6	7	8	9	10	Final
British Columbia (de Jong)	0	0	1	0	0	1	0	0	3	X	5
New Brunswick (Grattan) 🔨	1	1	0	1	2	0	1	1	0	X	7

=== Draw 18 ===
Thursday, March 6, 6:30 pm

Sheet A	1	2	3	4	5	6	7	8	9	10	Final
Quebec (Ménard) 🔨	2	0	0	0	1	0	2	0	2	1	8
Saskatchewan (Kleiter)	0	0	1	0	0	3	0	1	0	0	5

Sheet B	1	2	3	4	5	6	7	8	9	10	Final
Northwest Territories (Bartling)	0	1	0	1	0	0	0	0	0	X	2
Yukon (Scoffin) 🔨	0	0	1	0	1	1	0	3	0	X	6

Sheet C	1	2	3	4	5	6	7	8	9	10	Final
Ontario (Mooibroek)	0	0	1	0	0	2	0	0	0	0	3
Nova Scotia (Purcell) 🔨	0	1	0	2	0	0	0	2	1	1	7

Sheet D	1	2	3	4	5	6	7	8	9	10	11	Final
Saskatchewan (McEwen)	0	0	2	0	2	0	0	1	0	1	0	6
Alberta (Jacobs) 🔨	1	0	0	2	0	1	1	0	1	0	3	9

== Championship round ==
Page 1/2 Qualifier
A1 vs. B2
A1	Manitoba (Dunstone)	6
B2	Saskatchewan (McEwen)	5

Page 3/4 Qualifier
B2 vs. A3
B2	Saskatchewan (McEwen)	4
A3	Manitoba (Carruthers)	6

Qualified for Playoffs
Manitoba (Dunstone)	To 1 vs. 2 Page
Manitoba (Carruthers)	To 3 vs. 4 Page

Page 1/2 Qualifier
B1 vs. A2
B1	Alberta (Jacobs)	4
A2	Canada	7

Page 3/4 Qualifier
B1 vs. B3
B1	Alberta (Jacobs)	10
B3	Nova Scotia	6

Qualified for Playoffs
Canada	To 1 vs. 2 Page
Alberta (Jacobs)	To 3 vs. 4 Page

=== Page 1/2 Qualifier ===
Friday, March 7, 12:30 pm

Sheet B	1	2	3	4	5	6	7	8	9	10	Final
Manitoba (Dunstone) 🔨	1	0	0	2	0	2	0	1	0	0	6
Saskatchewan (McEwen)	0	1	0	0	2	0	0	0	1	1	5

Player percentages
Manitoba (Dunstone)		Saskatchewan (McEwen)	
Ryan Harnden	96%	Dan Marsh	96%
E. J. Harnden	93%	Kevin Marsh	85%
Colton Lott	86%	Colton Flasch	89%
Matt Dunstone	95%	Mike McEwen	90%
Total	93%	Total	90%

Sheet C	1	2	3	4	5	6	7	8	9	10	Final
Alberta (Jacobs) 🔨	1	0	1	0	1	0	0	1	0	X	4
Canada (Gushue)	0	1	0	1	0	1	1	0	3	X	7

Player percentages
Alberta (Jacobs)		Canada	
Ben Hebert	91%	Geoff Walker	96%
Brett Gallant	89%	Brendan Bottcher	91%
Marc Kennedy	80%	Mark Nichols	93%
Brad Jacobs	86%	Brad Gushue	98%
Total	86%	Total	94%

=== Page 3/4 Qualifier ===
Friday, March 7, 6:30 pm

Sheet B	1	2	3	4	5	6	7	8	9	10	Final
Alberta (Jacobs) 🔨	2	0	3	0	1	0	2	0	0	2	10
Nova Scotia (Purcell)	0	1	0	1	0	1	0	2	1	0	6

Player percentages
Alberta (Jacobs)		Nova Scotia	
Ben Hebert	90%	Ryan Abraham	100%
Brett Gallant	84%	Scott Saccary	79%
Marc Kennedy	94%	Luke Saunders	81%
Brad Jacobs	90%	Owen Purcell	81%
Total	89%	Total	85%

Sheet C	1	2	3	4	5	6	7	8	9	10	Final
Saskatchewan (McEwen) 🔨	0	2	0	0	0	0	1	0	1	X	4
Manitoba (Carruthers)	0	0	2	0	0	2	0	2	0	X	6

Player percentages
Saskatchewan (McEwen)		Manitoba (Carruthers)	
Dan Marsh	99%	Connor Njegovan	91%
Kevin Marsh	98%	Catlin Schneider	91%
Colton Flasch	90%	B. J. Neufeld	84%
Mike McEwen	82%	Reid Carruthers	96%
Total	92%	Total	91%

== Playoffs ==
Page playoff system
1	Manitoba (Dunstone)	7
2	Canada	4
3	Manitoba (Carruthers)	5
4	Alberta (Jacobs)	6

Semifinal
2	Canada	5
4	Alberta (Jacobs)	7

Final
1	Manitoba (Dunstone)	3
2	Alberta (Jacobs)	5

=== 1 vs. 2 ===
Saturday, March 8, 6:30 pm

Sheet C	1	2	3	4	5	6	7	8	9	10	Final
Manitoba (Dunstone) 🔨	1	0	2	0	1	0	0	0	2	1	7
Canada (Gushue)	0	2	0	1	0	1	0	0	0	0	4

Player percentages
Manitoba (Dunstone)		Canada	
Ryan Harnden	93%	Geoff Walker	85%
E. J. Harnden	84%	Brendan Bottcher	78%
Colton Lott	86%	Mark Nichols	86%
Matt Dunstone	93%	Brad Gushue	83%
Total	89%	Total	83%

=== 3 vs. 4 ===
Saturday, March 8, 12:30 pm

Sheet C	1	2	3	4	5	6	7	8	9	10	Final
Manitoba (Carruthers)	0	0	0	1	0	1	0	1	2	0	5
Alberta (Jacobs) 🔨	0	1	0	0	2	0	2	0	0	1	6

Player percentages
Manitoba (Carruthers)		Alberta (Jacobs)	
Connor Njegovan	90%	Ben Hebert	99%
Catlin Schneider	86%	Brett Gallant	93%
B. J. Neufeld	86%	Marc Kennedy	99%
Reid Carruthers	78%	Brad Jacobs	89%
Total	85%	Total	95%

=== Semifinal ===
Sunday, March 9, 11:00 am

Sheet C	1	2	3	4	5	6	7	8	9	10	Final
Canada (Gushue)	0	0	0	1	0	1	0	3	0	0	5
Alberta (Jacobs) 🔨	0	0	0	0	3	0	1	0	2	1	7

Player percentages
Canada		Alberta (Jacobs)	
Geoff Walker	91%	Ben Hebert	88%
Brendan Bottcher	81%	Brett Gallant	85%
Mark Nichols	89%	Marc Kennedy	93%
Brad Gushue	78%	Brad Jacobs	91%
Total	85%	Total	89%

=== Final ===
Sunday, March 9, 5:00 pm

Sheet C	1	2	3	4	5	6	7	8	9	10	Final
Manitoba (Dunstone) 🔨	0	0	0	0	2	0	0	0	1	0	3
Alberta (Jacobs)	0	0	0	0	0	1	1	0	0	3	5

Player percentages
Manitoba (Dunstone)		Alberta (Jacobs)	
Ryan Harnden	96%	Ben Hebert	98%
E. J. Harnden	98%	Brett Gallant	95%
Colton Lott	90%	Marc Kennedy	90%
Matt Dunstone	88%	Brad Jacobs	94%
Total	93%	Total	94%

== Statistics ==
=== Top 5 player percentages ===
Round robin only; minimum 6 games played

Key
First All-Star Team
Second All-Star Team

Leads	%
(Alberta) (K) Karrick Martin	95
(Manitoba) (D) Ryan Harnden	94
(Alberta) (J) Ben Hebert	94
(Manitoba) (C) Connor Njegovan	93
(Northern Ontario) Ian McMillan	93

Seconds	%
(Alberta) (J) Brett Gallant	92
(Canada) Brendan Bottcher	91
(Saskatchewan) (M) Kevin Marsh	90
(Northern Ontario) Tanner Horgan	90
(Quebec) Martin Crête	88

Thirds	%
(Canada) Mark Nichols	90
(Alberta) (J) Marc Kennedy	88
(Manitoba) (D) Colton Lott	87
(Saskatchewan) (M) Colton Flasch	87
(Northern Ontario) Jacob Horgan	86

Skips	%
(Alberta) (J) Brad Jacobs	93
(Canada) Brad Gushue	90
(Saskatchewan) (M) Mike McEwen	89
(Manitoba) (C) Reid Carruthers	87
(Manitoba) (D) Matt Dunstone	87

=== Perfect games ===
Round robin only; minimum 10 shots thrown

Player	Team	Position	Shots	Opponent
Scott Mitchell	Ontario	Second	16	Northwest Territories
Connor Njegovan	Manitoba (Carruthers)	Lead	16	Canada
Trevor Johnson	Saskatchewan (Kleiter)	Lead	20	Alberta (Jacobs)
Brendan Bottcher	Canada	Second (Note: Threw second stones for the first five ends and third stones for the last three ends.)	16	Nunavut
Ian McMillan	Northern Ontario	Lead	16	Nunavut

== Awards ==
=== All-Star teams ===
The All-Star Teams were determined by a combination of media vote and playing percentages:

First Team
Position	Name	Team
Skip	Brad Jacobs	Alberta (Jacobs)
Third	Mark Nichols	Canada
Second	Brett Gallant	Alberta (Jacobs)
Lead	Ryan Harnden	Manitoba (Dunstone)

Second Team
Position	Name	Team
Skip	Brad Gushue	Canada
Third	Marc Kennedy	Alberta (Jacobs)
Second	Kevin Marsh	Saskatchewan (McEwen)
Lead	Connor Njegovan	Manitoba (Carruthers)

=== Ross Harstone Sportsmanship Award ===
The Ross Harstone Sportsmanship Award is presented to the player chosen by their fellow peers as the curler who best represented Harstone's high ideals of good sportsmanship, observance of the rules, exemplary conduct and curling ability.

Name	Position	Team
Sheldon Wettig	Third	Nunavut

=== Hec Gervais Most Valuable Player Award ===
The Hec Gervais Most Valuable Player Award was awarded to the top player in the playoff round by members of the media in the Montana's Brier.

Name	Position	Team
Brad Jacobs	Skip	Alberta (Jacobs)

=== Paul McLean Award ===
The Paul McLean Award is presented by TSN to a media person who has made a lasting contribution behind the scenes to the betterment of the sport.

- Ted Wyman (in memoriam; accepted by his son Chris) – a respected longtime curling writer for the Winnipeg Sun who lost his battle with cancer in November 2024.

=== Ray Kingsmith Award ===
The Ray Kingsmith Award is presented to an individual who best demonstrates the commitment and dedication to the sport that made Kingsmith the consummate sport executive.

- Jock Tyre – Kelowna Curling Club

== Provincial and territorial playdowns ==
- 2025 Boston Pizza Cup (Alberta): February 5–9
- (British Columbia) 2025 BC Men's Curling Championship: January 21–26
- 2025 Viterra Championship (Manitoba): February 5–9
- 2025 New Brunswick Tankard: January 29 – February 2
- 2025 Newfoundland and Labrador Tankard: January 21–25
- 2025 Northern Ontario Men's Provincial Curling Championship: January 21–26
- 2025 Northwest Territories Men's Curling Championship: January 30 – February 2
- 2025 Ocean Contractors Men's Curling Championship (Nova Scotia): January 14–19
- 2025 Nunavut Brier Playdowns: January 10–11
- 2025 Ontario Tankard: January 19–26
- (Prince Edward Island) 2025 PEI Men's Curling Championship: January 23–25
- 2025 Quebec Tankard: January 14–19
- 2025 SaskTel Tankard (Saskatchewan): January 21–26
- 2025 Yukon Men's Curling Championship: January 10–11
