= 2019 Canadian U18 Curling Championships – Men's tournament =

2019 Canadian U18 Curling Championships Men's tournament
- Host city: Sherwood Park, Alberta
- Arena: Glen Allan Recreation Complex & Sherwood Park Curling Club
- Dates: April 2–7
- Winner: Ontario
- Curling club: Coldwater & District CC, Coldwater
- Skip: Dylan Niepage
- Third: Sam Hastings
- Second: Cameron Vanbodegom
- Lead: Treyton Cowell
- Alternate: Christopher Inglis
- Coach: Jeff Vanbodegom
- Finalist: British Columbia (Colwell)

The men's tournament of the 2019 Canadian U18 Curling Championships was held from April 2 to 7 at the Glen Allan Recreation Complex and the Sherwood Park Curling Club in Sherwood Park, Alberta.

== Teams ==
The teams are listed as follows:

Province	Skip	Third	Second	Lead	Alternate	Club(s)
Alberta	Nathan Molberg	Benjamin Helston	Nicholas Warkman	Morgan Bilassy		St. Albert Curling Club, St. Albert
Alberta (Host)	Cortland Sonnenberg	Owen Fenske	Jaxon Hiebert	Adam Elsenheimer		Sexsmith Curling Club, Sexsmith & Grand Prairie Curling Club, Grand Prairie
British Columbia	Erik Colwell	Mitchell Kopytko	Benjamin Morin	Tyler Powell		Vernon Curling Club, Vernon & Kamloops Curling Club, Kamloops & Invermere Curling Club, Invermere
Manitoba	Jordon McDonald	Jaedon Neuert	Braxton Kuntz	Alexandre Fontaine		St. Vital Curling Club, Winnipeg
New Brunswick	Josh Nowlan	Wil Robertson	Isaiah Downey	Jacob Nowlan		Curl Moncton, Moncton
Newfoundland and Labrador	Joel Krats	Ethan Davidge	Jared Davidge	Aaron Fletham		Gander Curling Club, Gander
Northern Ontario	Malcolm O'Bright	Andrew Hong	Dylan Burns	Sean Breadmore	Kyle Vainio	North Bay Granite Curling Club, North Bay
Northwest Territories	Adam Naugler	Logan Waddell	Jullian Bowling	Shawn Dragon	Tasir Bhuiyan	Yellowknife Curling Club, Yellowknife
Nova Scotia	Owen Purcell (Fourth)	Adam McEachren (Skip)	Alex McDonah	Scott Weagle		Truro Curling Club, Truro
Nova Scotia 2	Ethan Young	Kieran Mackintosh	Chris Churchhill	Aden Kavanaugh		Mayflower Curling Club, Halifax
Ontario	Dylan Niepage	Sam Hastings	Cameron Vanbodegom	Treyton Cowell	Christopher Inglis	Coldwater & District Curling Club, Coldwater
Prince Edward Island	Mitchell Schut	Nicholas Johnston	Liam Kelly	Colin Mackenzie		Cornwall Curling Club, Cornwall
Quebec	Raphaël Patry	Anthony Pedneault	Zachary Pedneault	Jacob Labrecque		Club de Curling Kenogami, Saguenay
Saskatchewan	Jayden Bindig	Nathen Pomedli	Braden Fleischhacker	Ethan Nygaard		Wadena Curling Club, Wadena

== Round-robin standings ==
Final round-robin standings

Key
Teams to Knockout Round

Pool A	Skip	W	L
British Columbia	Erik Colwell	5	1
Manitoba	Jordon McDonald	5	1
Ontario	Dylan Niepage	4	2
Nova Scotia 2 (Note: Nunavut and Yukon did not send men's teams to the tournament. Their spots were filled by an Alberta host team and a second Nova Scotia team.)	Ethan Young	3	3
Quebec	Raphaël Patry	2	4
Northern Ontario	Malcolm O'Bright	2	4
Northwest Territories	Adam Naugler	0	6

Pool B	Skip	W	L
Alberta	Nathan Molberg	5	1
New Brunswick	Josh Nowlan	4	2
Nova Scotia	Adam McEachren	4	2
Saskatchewan	Jayden Bindig	3	3
Alberta (Host)	Cortland Sonnenberg	2	4
Prince Edward Island	Mitchell Schut	2	4
Newfoundland and Labrador	Joel Krats	1	5

== Round-robin results ==
All draw times are listed in Mountain Daylight Time (UTC−06:00).

=== Pool A ===
==== Draw 1 ====
Tuesday, April 2, 2:00 pm

Sheet A	1	2	3	4	5	6	7	8	Final
Northern Ontario (O'Bright)	0	1	0	5	0	2	0	1	9
Northwest Territories (Naugler) 🔨	2	0	2	0	1	0	1	0	6

Sheet F	1	2	3	4	5	6	7	8	Final
Ontario (Niepage) 🔨	1	0	0	0	1	0	1	0	3
British Columbia (Colwell)	0	1	1	0	0	1	0	1	4

==== Draw 2 ====
Tuesday, April 2, 6:00 pm

Sheet B	1	2	3	4	5	6	7	8	Final
Manitoba (McDonald)	0	2	0	3	1	0	0	0	6
Quebec (Patry) 🔨	1	0	0	0	0	1	1	2	5

Sheet C	1	2	3	4	5	6	7	8	Final
British Columbia (Colwell) 🔨	0	2	0	3	0	1	0	0	6
Nova Scotia 2 (Young)	2	0	3	0	1	0	1	1	8

==== Draw 3 ====
Wednesday, April 3, 10:00 am

Sheet H	1	2	3	4	5	6	7	8	Final
Northwest Territories (Naugler)	1	0	0	2	0	0	1	X	4
Manitoba (McDonald) 🔨	0	4	2	0	0	4	0	X	10

Sheet I	1	2	3	4	5	6	7	8	9	Final
Nova Scotia 2 (Young)	1	1	2	0	1	0	1	0	0	6
Ontario (Niepage) 🔨	0	0	0	1	0	2	0	3	2	8

==== Draw 4 ====
Wednesday, April 3, 2:00 pm

Sheet B	1	2	3	4	5	6	7	8	Final
British Columbia (Colwell) 🔨	1	0	3	2	1	2	X	X	9
Northwest Territories (Naugler)	0	1	0	0	0	0	X	X	1

Sheet G	1	2	3	4	5	6	7	8	9	Final
Quebec (Patry)	0	0	2	1	0	1	0	0	1	5
Northern Ontario (O'Bright) 🔨	0	1	0	0	1	0	1	1	0	4

==== Draw 5 ====
Wednesday, April 3, 6:00 pm

Sheet G	1	2	3	4	5	6	7	8	Final
Ontario (Niepage)	0	1	0	1	0	0	0	X	2
Manitoba (McDonald) 🔨	2	0	2	0	1	0	2	X	7

Sheet H	1	2	3	4	5	6	7	8	Final
Quebec (Patry)	1	0	1	0	1	0	1	X	4
Nova Scotia 2 (Young) 🔨	0	2	0	1	0	2	0	X	5

==== Draw 6 ====
Thursday, April 4, 2:00 pm

Sheet B	1	2	3	4	5	6	7	8	Final
Nova Scotia 2 (Young) 🔨	1	0	2	0	0	0	X	X	3
Northern Ontario (O'Bright)	0	4	0	2	2	1	X	X	9

Sheet F	1	2	3	4	5	6	7	8	Final
Northwest Territories (Naugler)	0	1	0	0	0	1	0	X	2
Quebec (Patry) 🔨	1	0	3	3	2	0	0	X	9

Sheet I	1	2	3	4	5	6	7	8	Final
Manitoba (McDonald)	1	0	1	0	1	1	1	0	5
British Columbia (Colwell) 🔨	0	2	0	2	0	0	0	2	6

==== Draw 7 ====
Thursday, April 4, 6:00 pm

Sheet A	1	2	3	4	5	6	7	8	Final
Manitoba (McDonald)	0	2	0	0	1	0	2	3	8
Nova Scotia 2 (Young) 🔨	1	0	1	1	0	2	0	0	5

Sheet D	1	2	3	4	5	6	7	8	Final
Quebec (Patry) 🔨	2	0	0	0	2	0	2	0	6
British Columbia (Colwell)	0	2	2	0	0	3	0	1	8

Sheet E	1	2	3	4	5	6	7	8	Final
Northern Ontario (O'Bright) 🔨	0	0	0	1	1	0	2	X	4
Ontario (Niepage)	2	1	2	0	0	2	0	X	7

==== Draw 8 ====
Friday, April 5, 10:00 am

Sheet D	1	2	3	4	5	6	7	8	Final
Northwest Territories (Naugler)	0	0	0	1	0	0	X	X	1
Ontario (Niepage) 🔨	3	2	2	0	2	1	X	X	10

==== Draw 9 ====
Friday, April 5, 2:00 pm

Sheet C	1	2	3	4	5	6	7	8	Final
Ontario (Niepage)	0	1	1	1	1	0	2	X	6
Quebec (Patry) 🔨	1	0	0	0	0	2	0	X	3

Sheet H	1	2	3	4	5	6	7	8	Final
British Columbia (Colwell) 🔨	0	2	0	2	1	0	3	0	8
Northern Ontario (O'Bright)	0	0	1	0	0	3	0	0	4

==== Draw 10 ====
Friday, April 5, 6:00 pm

Sheet D	1	2	3	4	5	6	7	8	Final
Northern Ontario (O'Bright) 🔨	1	1	0	0	0	0	1	X	3
Manitoba (McDonald)	0	0	0	2	1	2	0	X	5

Sheet E	1	2	3	4	5	6	7	8	Final
Nova Scotia 2 (Young) 🔨	0	2	4	5	0	0	4	X	15
Northwest Territories (Naugler)	2	0	0	0	1	0	0	X	3

=== Pool B ===
==== Draw 1 ====
Tuesday, April 2, 2:00 pm

Sheet C	1	2	3	4	5	6	7	8	Final
Nova Scotia (McEachren) 🔨	2	0	3	5	0	2	X	X	12
Prince Edward Island (Schut)	0	1	0	0	2	0	X	X	3

Sheet H	1	2	3	4	5	6	7	8	Final
Alberta (Molberg) 🔨	3	0	2	1	1	1	X	X	8
Newfoundland and Labrador (Krats)	0	2	0	0	0	0	X	X	2

==== Draw 2 ====
Tuesday, April 2, 6:00 pm

Sheet E	1	2	3	4	5	6	7	8	Final
Newfoundland and Labrador (Krats)	0	0	0	2	0	0	X	X	2
Saskatchewan (Bindig) 🔨	0	3	2	0	2	4	X	X	11

Sheet G	1	2	3	4	5	6	7	8	Final
Alberta Host (Sonnenberg)	0	0	3	0	0	0	0	X	3
Nova Scotia (McEachren) 🔨	3	1	0	0	1	1	2	X	8

Sheet H	1	2	3	4	5	6	7	8	Final
Prince Edward Island (Schut)	0	0	2	1	1	1	0	0	5
New Brunswick (Nowlan) 🔨	0	0	0	0	0	0	2	2	4

==== Draw 3 ====
Wednesday, April 3, 10:00 am

Sheet A	1	2	3	4	5	6	7	8	Final
New Brunswick (Nowlan)	1	1	0	0	1	1	1	1	6
Alberta (Molberg) 🔨	0	0	2	3	0	0	0	0	5

Sheet F	1	2	3	4	5	6	7	8	Final
Saskatchewan (Bindig)	0	0	0	4	0	0	1	2	7
Alberta Host (Sonnenberg) 🔨	2	0	1	0	0	2	0	0	5

==== Draw 4 ====
Wednesday, April 3, 2:00 pm

Sheet D	1	2	3	4	5	6	7	8	9	Final
Prince Edward Island (Schut) 🔨	2	0	2	0	0	1	0	1	1	7
Newfoundland and Labrador (Krats)	0	3	0	0	3	0	0	0	0	6

Sheet E	1	2	3	4	5	6	7	8	Final
Nova Scotia (McEachren)	0	0	0	0	0	0	0	X	0
Alberta (Molberg) 🔨	1	0	1	2	1	1	0	X	6

==== Draw 5 ====
Wednesday, April 3, 6:00 pm

Sheet B	1	2	3	4	5	6	7	8	Final
Saskatchewan (Bindig) 🔨	1	0	1	0	0	1	1	1	5
Prince Edward Island (Schut)	0	1	0	2	0	0	0	0	3

Sheet C	1	2	3	4	5	6	7	8	Final
Newfoundland and Labrador (Krats) 🔨	0	1	0	1	0	2	1	0	5
Alberta Host (Sonnenberg)	0	0	2	0	3	0	0	3	8

Sheet F	1	2	3	4	5	6	7	8	Final
New Brunswick (Nowlan) 🔨	1	0	0	2	1	2	1	X	7
Nova Scotia (McEachren)	0	2	1	0	0	0	0	X	3

==== Draw 6 ====
Thursday, April 4, 2:00 pm

Sheet D	1	2	3	4	5	6	7	8	Final
Alberta (Molberg)	0	2	0	0	0	0	5	0	7
Saskatchewan (Bindig) 🔨	1	0	0	2	0	0	0	0	3

Sheet E	1	2	3	4	5	6	7	8	Final
Alberta Host (Sonnenberg) 🔨	2	0	0	2	0	0	0	X	4
New Brunswick (Nowlan)	0	0	2	0	3	3	1	X	9

==== Draw 7 ====
Thursday, April 4, 6:00 pm

Sheet G	1	2	3	4	5	6	7	8	Final
Alberta (Molberg) 🔨	0	0	2	0	1	1	0	1	5
Prince Edward Island (Schut)	0	0	0	0	0	0	3	0	3

Sheet I	1	2	3	4	5	6	7	8	Final
Nova Scotia (McEachren) 🔨	0	0	0	0	0	1	2	X	3
Newfoundland and Labrador (Krats)	0	0	0	0	1	0	0	X	1

==== Draw 8 ====
Friday, April 5, 10:00 am

Sheet C	1	2	3	4	5	6	7	8	Final
New Brunswick (Nowlan)	0	0	1	0	2	1	0	1	5
Saskatchewan (Bindig) 🔨	0	0	0	2	0	0	1	0	3

==== Draw 9 ====
Friday, April 5, 2:00 pm

Sheet A	1	2	3	4	5	6	7	8	Final
Prince Edward Island (Schut) 🔨	0	1	0	0	1	1	0	X	3
Alberta Host (Sonnenberg)	1	0	3	1	0	0	2	X	7

Sheet B	1	2	3	4	5	6	7	8	Final
Newfoundland and Labrador (Krats)	0	2	0	3	0	0	1	1	7
New Brunswick (Nowlan) 🔨	2	0	1	0	1	1	0	0	5

==== Draw 10 ====
Friday, April 5, 6:00 pm

Sheet H	1	2	3	4	5	6	7	8	Final
Saskatchewan (Bindig)	0	0	1	1	0	0	2	0	4
Nova Scotia (McEachren) 🔨	0	1	0	0	2	1	0	1	5

Sheet I	1	2	3	4	5	6	7	8	Final
Alberta Host (Sonnenberg)	0	1	0	0	0	1	0	X	2
Alberta (Molberg) 🔨	2	0	1	0	2	0	1	X	6

== Knockout round ==
=== A Bracket ===
Qualifier 1
A1	British Columbia	7
B4	Saskatchewan	3
A1	British Columbia	6
A2	Manitoba	7
A2	Manitoba	9
B3	Nova Scotia	4

Qualifier 2
B2	New Brunswick	6
A3	Ontario	9
A3	Ontario	5
B1	Alberta	4
B1	Alberta	6
A4	Nova Scotia 2	4

==== A Semifinals ====
Saturday, April 6, 8:30 am

Sheet B	1	2	3	4	5	6	7	8	Final
British Columbia (Colwell) 🔨	1	0	0	1	0	2	2	1	7
Saskatchewan (Bindig)	0	1	0	0	2	0	0	0	3

Sheet C	1	2	3	4	5	6	7	8	Final
Manitoba (McDonald) 🔨	2	0	0	5	0	2	X	X	9
Nova Scotia (McEachren)	0	1	0	0	3	0	X	X	4

Sheet D	1	2	3	4	5	6	7	8	Final
New Brunswick (Nowlan)	0	0	4	0	1	1	0	X	6
Ontario (Niepage) 🔨	2	2	0	3	0	0	2	X	9

Sheet E	1	2	3	4	5	6	7	8	Final
Alberta (Molberg) 🔨	1	0	2	0	0	1	0	2	6
Nova Scotia 2 (Young)	0	2	0	0	1	0	1	0	4

==== A Finals ====
Saturday, April 6, 2:00 pm

Sheet F	1	2	3	4	5	6	7	8	9	Final
British Columbia (Colwell) 🔨	2	0	1	0	2	0	0	1	0	6
Manitoba (McDonald)	0	3	0	1	0	1	1	0	1	7

Sheet G	1	2	3	4	5	6	7	8	Final
Ontario (Niepage)	0	2	1	0	1	0	0	1	5
Alberta (Molberg) 🔨	2	0	0	0	0	1	1	0	4

=== B Bracket ===
			Qualifier 3
			B1	Alberta	3
B4	Saskatchewan	6	B3	Nova Scotia	5
B3	Nova Scotia	7

			Qualifier 4
			A1	British Columbia	6
B2	New Brunswick	9	B2	New Brunswick	4
A4	Nova Scotia 2	4

==== B Semifinals ====
Saturday, April 6, 2:00 pm

Sheet H	1	2	3	4	5	6	7	8	9	Final
Saskatchewan (Bindig)	0	2	1	0	2	0	1	0	0	6
Nova Scotia (McEachren) 🔨	2	0	0	2	0	1	0	1	1	7

Sheet I	1	2	3	4	5	6	7	8	Final
New Brunswick (Nowlan) 🔨	2	1	0	0	1	0	3	2	9
Nova Scotia 2 (Young)	0	0	1	1	0	2	0	0	4

==== B Finals ====
Saturday, April 6, 7:30 pm

Sheet C	1	2	3	4	5	6	7	8	Final
British Columbia (Colwell) 🔨	0	0	2	0	0	1	2	1	6
New Brunswick (Nowlan)	1	1	0	2	0	0	0	0	4

Sheet D	1	2	3	4	5	6	7	8	Final
Alberta (Molberg) 🔨	0	2	0	0	0	1	0	0	3
Nova Scotia (McEachren)	1	0	0	0	2	0	1	1	5

== Playoffs ==
Semifinal
A2	Manitoba	2
A3	Ontario	12
B2	British Columbia	8
B3	Nova Scotia	5

Final
A3	Ontario	6
B2	British Columbia	5

Bronze medal game
A2	Manitoba	4
B3	Nova Scotia	2

=== Semifinals ===
Sunday, April 7, 9:00 am

Sheet A	1	2	3	4	5	6	7	8	Final
Manitoba (McDonald) 🔨	0	2	0	0	0	0	X	X	2
Ontario (Niepage)	1	0	2	2	2	5	X	X	12

Sheet B	1	2	3	4	5	6	7	8	Final
British Columbia (Colwell) 🔨	2	1	0	1	0	3	0	1	8
Nova Scotia (McEachren)	0	0	2	0	1	0	2	0	5

=== Bronze medal game ===
Sunday, April 7, 1:00 pm

Sheet D	1	2	3	4	5	6	7	8	Final
Manitoba (McDonald) 🔨	1	0	1	1	0	0	1	X	4
Nova Scotia (McEachren)	0	2	0	0	0	0	0	X	2

=== Final ===
Sunday, April 7, 1:00 pm

Sheet C	1	2	3	4	5	6	7	8	Final
Ontario (Niepage)	0	2	2	1	0	1	0	0	6
British Columbia (Colwell) 🔨	2	0	0	0	1	0	1	1	5
