= Daniel Bruce (curler) =

Canadian curler

- Curler
- Born: January 14, 1999 (age 27); Ottawa, Ontario

Team
- Curling club: RE/Max Centre, St. John's, NL
- Skip: Joel Krats
- Third: Ryan McNeil Lamswood
- Second: Daniel Bruce
- Lead: Aaron Feltham

Curling career
- Member Association: Newfoundland and Labrador
- Brier: 1 (2025)
- Top CTRS ranking: 67th (2024–25)

Daniel Bruce (born January 14, 1999) is a Canadian curler originally from Corner Brook, Newfoundland and Labrador. He currently plays second on Team Joel Krats.

== Career ==
Bruce competed in three Canadian Junior Curling Championships in his junior career in 2018, 2019 and 2020. His best result came in 2020 skipping his own team of Ryan McNeil Lamswood at third, Joel Krats at second and Nathan King at lead. The team finished the round robin and championship pool with an 8–2 record, which qualified them for the playoffs. They defeated Rylan Kleiter of Saskatchewan in the semifinal before coming up short to Jacques Gauthier's Manitoba rink in the final. It was the first time since 2011 that Newfoundland and Labrador qualified for the playoffs. Also in his junior career, Bruce won a silver medal at the 2019 U Sports/Curling Canada University Curling Championships as third for Greg Blyde.

Out of juniors, Bruce joined the Andrew Symonds rink for the 2020–21 season. The team competed in the 2021 Newfoundland and Labrador Tankard, where they lost in a tiebreaker to Colin Thomas.

In 2021, Bruce reunited with McNeil Lamswood and King to compete for the 2021-22 season. They beat Team Nathan Young to become the team to represent the Memorial University Seahawks at the 2022 Atlantic University Sport Curling Championships. They ended up placing runner-up to the Dalhousie Tigers team. In the 2022 Newfoundland and Labrador Tankard the team failed to qualify for the play-offs; finishing with a 3-5 record.

Bruce, McNeil Lamswood, and Feltham joined forces with Ty Dilello for the 2024-25 curling season, where they found immediate success, representing Newfoundland and Labrador at the 2025 Montana's Brier, after winning the team's first 2025 Newfoundland and Labrador Tankard title over Andrew Symonds.

== Personal life ==
Bruce attended the Memorial University of Newfoundland. He currently lives in St. John's, Newfoundland and Labrador and works as a member service advisor for NLCU.

== Teams ==
| Season | Skip | Third | Second | Lead |
|---|---|---|---|---|
| 2015–16 | Daniel Bruce | Ryan McNeil Lamswood | Andrew Bruce | Nathan King |
| 2016–17 | Daniel Bruce | Ryan McNeil Lamswood | Andrew Bruce | Nathan King |
| 2017–18 | Daniel Bruce | Ryan McNeil Lamswood | Andrew Bruce | Nathan King |
| 2018–19 | Greg Blyde | Daniel Bruce | Ryan McNeil Lamswood | Nathan King |
| 2019–20 | Daniel Bruce | Ryan McNeil Lamswood | Joel Krats | Nathan King |
| 2020–21 | Andrew Symonds | Chris Ford | Daniel Bruce | Keith Jewer |
| 2021–22 | Ryan McNeil Lamswood | Daniel Bruce | Nathan King | Aaron Feltham |
| 2022–23 | Ryan McNeil Lamswood | Daniel Bruce | Graeme Weagle | Aaron Feltham |
| 2023–24 | Ryan McNeil Lamswood | Daniel Bruce | Graeme Weagle | Aaron Feltham |
| 2024–25 | Ty Dilello | Ryan McNeil Lamswood | Daniel Bruce | Aaron Feltham |
| 2025–26 | Ty Dilello | Ryan McNeil Lamswood | Daniel Bruce | Aaron Feltham |
| 2026–27 | Joel Krats | Ryan McNeil Lamswood | Daniel Bruce | Aaron Feltham |
