= Aaron Feltham (curler) =

Canadian curler (born 2003)

- Curler
- Born: October 24, 2003 (age 23); Gander, Newfoundland and Labrador

Team
- Curling club: RE/MAX Centre, St. John's, NL
- Skip: Joel Krats
- Third: Ryan McNeil Lamswood
- Second: Daniel Bruce
- Lead: Aaron Feltham

Curling career
- Member Association: Newfoundland and Labrador
- Brier: 1 (2025)
- Top CTRS ranking: 67th (2024–25)

Aaron Feltham (born October 24, 2003) is a Canadian curler from Gander, Newfoundland and Labrador. He currently plays lead on Team Joel Krats.

== Career ==
=== Juniors ===
Feltham spent his early years of curling playing with the Ethan Davidge rink out of the Gander Curling Club, where they would become back-to-back provincial champions out of U16. For the 2019 season, Labrador curler Joel Krats would join the team to replace Angus Tulloch, and together they would defeat Nathan Young in the U18 provincial finals to send themselves to the 2019 Canadian U18 Curling Championships. This would be Feltham's first opportunity to represent Newfoundland and Labrador at the national-level. His team would finish with a record of 1-5, only defeating Team Josh Nowlan of New Brunswick.

In 2022, after bouncing around a couple of random teams, Feltham would find some stability and join the Ryan McNeil Lamswood rink as the lead. While still of junior eligibility, they would compete in the 2022 Newfoundland and Labrador Tankard where the McNeil Lamswood rink would fail to qualify for the playoffs and finish with a 3-5 record. Feltham would also compete on the Memorial University of Newfoundland Seahawks curling team this year, where he would get honored as the Seahawks curling most valuable player. Feltham also got to compete in the 2022 U21 Newfoundland and Labrador curling provincials with the Carter Holden. They ultimately would finish second last place, losing every game but one.

Feltham would return to the McNeil Lamswood rink again in 2023. This year in the 2023 Newfoundland and Labrador Tankard, they would finish the round robin in second place with a record of 5-2. The team would end up getting bounced in the semi-finals however to the Greg Smith rink. Feltham would also find himself representing Newfoundland and Labrador for U21s for the first time this year. He joined the Nathan Young rink for this tournament to replace an aged-out Ben Stringer. They would lose to Simon Perry in the finals of the Newfoundland and Labrador provincials, and would qualify to the 2023 Canadian Junior Curling Championships as Team NL2. Here they would finish with a 5-3 record and just miss out on qualifying for the playoffs.

=== Men's ===
In 2024, Feltham and the McNeil Lamswood rink would take another chance at qualifying for the brier. This year in the 2024 Newfoundland and Labrador Tankard, they would finish the round robin with a 6-2 record and qualify for the brier. Once again they would lose in the semi-finals, this time to the Andrew Symonds rink.

In 2025, Feltham and his teammates Ryan McNeil Lamswood and Daniel Bruce would team up with Manitoban curler and author Ty Dilello for a run at the 2025 Montana's Brier. In the 2025 Newfoundland and Labrador Tankard, Feltham's rink would win both the B- and C-event's on their way to eventually defeating the Andrew Symonds rink in the semi-finals to claim the tankard championship. This would qualify Feltham and his team for the 2025 Montana's Brier, where they would finish the round robin with a 1-7 record.

=== Mixed ===
Feltham would play second on a team skipped by his father Rod, and compete at the 2025 Newfoundland and Labrador Mixed Provincial Championships. This team would go on to finish the round robin with a record of 3-3, then beat Team Ephram Noel in the tiebreakers and Team Adam Boland in the finals to win and qualify themselves for the 2025 Canadian Mixed Curling Championship. There, they finished in 6th place with a 5–5 record.

== Personal life ==
His father, Rod Feltham, is also a curler. They curled together at the 2022 and 2026 Canadian Curling Club Championships. Feltham currently works as a parts advisor at Canadian Tire and lives in St. John's, Newfoundland and Labrador.

== Teams ==
Season	Skip	Third	Second	Lead
2018–19	Joel Krats	Ethan Davidge	Jared Davidge	Aaron Feltham
2019–20	Joel Krats	Ethan Davidge	Jared Davidge	Aaron Feltham
2021–22	Ryan McNeil Lamswood	Daniel Bruce	Nathan King	Aaron Feltham
2021–22	Carter Holden	Jensen Wiseman	Aaron Feltham	Adam Currie
2022–23	Ryan McNeil Lamswood	Daniel Bruce	Graeme Weagle	Aaron Feltham
2023–24	Ryan McNeil Lamswood	Daniel Bruce	Graeme Weagle	Aaron Feltham
2024–25	Ty Dilello	Ryan McNeil Lamswood	Daniel Bruce	Aaron Feltham
2025–26	Ty Dilello	Ryan McNeil Lamswood	Daniel Bruce	Aaron Feltham
2026–27	Joel Krats	Ryan McNeil Lamswood	Daniel Bruce	Aaron Feltham
