= Nathan King (curler) =

Canadian curler

- Curler
- Born: April 16, 1999 (age 27); Corner Brook, Newfoundland and Labrador

Team
- Curling club: RE/MAX Centre, St. John's, NL

Curling career
- Member Association: Newfoundland and Labrador
- Brier: 1 (2025)
- Top CTRS ranking: 67th (2024–25)

Nathan King (born April 16, 1999) is a Canadian curler from Corner Brook, Newfoundland and Labrador.

== Career ==
King competed in three Canadian Junior Curling Championships in his junior career in 2018, 2019 and 2020. His best result came in 2020 playing lead for Daniel Bruce with Ryan McNeil Lamswood at third and Joel Krats at second. The team finished the round robin and championship pool with an 8–2 record, which qualified them for the playoffs. They defeated Rylan Kleiter of Saskatchewan in the semifinal before coming up short to Jacques Gauthier's Manitoba rink in the final. It was the first time since 2011 that Newfoundland and Labrador qualified for the playoffs. Also in his junior career, King won a silver medal at the 2019 U Sports/Curling Canada University Curling Championships as lead for Greg Blyde.

King spared for Team Ryan McNeil Lamswood at the 2021 Newfoundland and Labrador Tankard as two of their players could not play due to the COVID-19 pandemic in Newfoundland and Labrador. The team made it to the semifinal, where they lost to Colin Thomas.

For the 2021-22 curling season, King stayed with the McNeil Lamswood rink. They beat Team Nathan Young to become the team to represent the Memorial University Seahawks at the 2022 Atlantic University Sport Curling Championships. They ended up placing runner-up to the Dalhousie Tigers team. In the 2022 Newfoundland and Labrador Tankard the team failed to qualify for the play-offs; finishing with a 3-5 record.

== Personal life ==
After graduating from Memorial University of Newfoundland in 2022, King was hired as a full-time accountant at Ernst & Young. He currently lives in St. John's, Newfoundland and Labrador.

== Teams ==
Season	Skip	Third	Second	Lead
2015–16	Daniel Bruce	Ryan McNeil Lamswood	Andrew Bruce	Nathan King
2016–17	Daniel Bruce	Ryan McNeil Lamswood	Andrew Bruce	Nathan King
2017–18	Daniel Bruce	Ryan McNeil Lamswood	Andrew Bruce	Nathan King
2018–19	Greg Blyde	Daniel Bruce	Ryan McNeil Lamswood	Nathan King
2019–20	Daniel Bruce	Ryan McNeil Lamswood	Joel Krats	Nathan King
2020–21	Ryan McNeil Lamswood	Joel Krats	James Trickett	Nathan King
2021–22	Ryan McNeil Lamswood	Daniel Bruce	Nathan King	Aaron Feltham
