= Ryan McNeil Lamswood =

Canadian curler

- Curler
- Born: March 19, 2000 (age 26); Corner Brook, Newfoundland and Labrador

Team
- Curling club: RE/MAX Centre, St. John's, NL
- Skip: Joel Krats
- Third: Ryan McNeil Lamswood
- Second: Daniel Bruce
- Lead: Aaron Feltham

Curling career
- Member Association: Newfoundland and Labrador
- Brier: 2 (2021, 2025)
- Top CTRS ranking: 67th (2024–25)

Ryan McNeil Lamswood (born March 19, 2000) is a Canadian curler from Stephenville, Newfoundland and Labrador. He currently plays third on Team Joel Krats.

== Career ==
McNeil Lamswood competed in five Canadian Junior Curling Championships in his junior career in 2015, 2016, 2018, 2019 and 2020. His best result came in 2020 playing third for Daniel Bruce with Joel Krats at second and Nathan King at lead. The team finished the round robin and championship pool with an 8–2 record, which qualified them for the playoffs. They defeated Rylan Kleiter of Saskatchewan in the semifinal before coming up short to Jacques Gauthier's Manitoba rink in the final. It was the first time since 2011 that Newfoundland and Labrador qualified for the playoffs. Also in his junior career, McNeil Lamswood won a silver medal at the 2019 U Sports/Curling Canada University Curling Championships as second for Greg Blyde and skipped the Newfoundland and Labrador team to a fourth-place finish at the 2018 Canadian U18 Curling Championships.

In 2020, McNeil Lamswood spared on the Brad Gushue team at the 2020 Stu Sells 1824 Halifax Classic as Geoff Walker was unable to attend due to the COVID-19 pandemic in Canada. The team made it all the way to the final where they defeated Matthew Manuel to win the event. Also during the 2020–21 season, McNeil Lamswood skipped his own team in the 2021 Newfoundland and Labrador Tankard. After going 6–1 in the round robin, they came up short to Colin Thomas in the semifinal.

In 2021, McNeil Lamswood picked up Aaron Feltham to play in the lead position for the quartet. They beat Team Nathan Young to become the team to represent the Memorial University Seahawks at the 2022 Atlantic University Sport Curling Championships. They ended up placing runner-up to the Dalhousie Tigers team. In the 2022 Newfoundland and Labrador Tankard the team failed to qualify for the play-offs; finishing with a 3-5 record.

McNeil Lamswood, Bruce, and Feltham joined forces with Ty Dilello for the 2024-25 curling season, where they found immediate success, representing Newfoundland and Labrador at the 2025 Montana's Brier, after winning the team's first 2025 Newfoundland and Labrador Tankard title over Andrew Symonds.

== Personal life ==
McNeil Lamswood graduated with a communications degree at Memorial University of Newfoundland in 2024. He is currently an education student at Cape Breton University. He is engaged to Megan Gabriel. McNeil Lamswood's sister, Sarah, is also a competitive curler on the World Curling Tour for Team Godsland.

== Teams ==
Season	Skip	Third	Second	Lead
2014–15	Greg Smith	Ryan McNeil Lamswood	Kyle Barron	Craig Laing
2015–16	Greg Smith	Ryan McNeil Lamswood	Kyle Barron	Craig Laing
2016–17	Daniel Bruce	Ryan McNeil Lamswood	Andrew Bruce	Nathan King
2017–18	Daniel Bruce	Ryan McNeil Lamswood	Andrew Bruce	Nathan King
2018–19	Greg Blyde	Daniel Bruce	Ryan McNeil Lamswood	Nathan King
2019–20	Daniel Bruce	Ryan McNeil Lamswood	Joel Krats	Nathan King
2020–21	Ryan McNeil Lamswood	Joel Krats	James Trickett	Nathan King
2021–22	Ryan McNeil Lamswood	Daniel Bruce	Nathan King	Aaron Feltham
2022–23	Ryan McNeil Lamswood	Daniel Bruce	Graeme Weagle	Aaron Feltham
2023–24	Ryan McNeil Lamswood	Daniel Bruce	Graeme Weagle	Aaron Feltham
2024–25	Ty Dilello	Ryan McNeil Lamswood	Daniel Bruce	Aaron Feltham
2025–26	Ty Dilello	Ryan McNeil Lamswood	Daniel Bruce	Aaron Feltham
2026–27	Joel Krats	Ryan McNeil Lamswood	Daniel Bruce	Aaron Feltham
