= Joel Krats =

Canadian curler

- Curler
- Born: January 7, 2002 (age 24); Labrador City, Newfoundland and Labrador

Team
- Curling club: Halifax CC, Halifax, NS
- Skip: Joel Krats
- Third: Ryan McNeil Lamswood
- Second: Daniel Bruce
- Lead: Aaron Feltham

Curling career
- Member Association: Newfoundland and Labrador (2017–2021; 2026–present); Nova Scotia (2021–2023); New Brunswick (2023–2026)
- Brier: 3 (2024, 2025, 2026)
- Top CTRS ranking: 19th (2022–23)
Medal record
Men's curling
Representing Canada
World Junior Championships
Bronze medal – third place	2022 Jönköping

Joel Krats (born January 7, 2002) is a Canadian curler originally from Newfoundland and Labrador. He currently skips his own team.

== Career ==
=== Juniors ===
In 2018, Joel Krats competed at the national-eligible age group for the first time. He had departed from his previous Labrador squad and moved over to the Gander Curling Club to join and skip for the two-time defending U16 Newfoundland & Labrador Provincial Champions; the Ethan Davidge rink. His first event was competing in the 2018 U21 Newfoundland & Labrador Provincial Championship where he finished in last place with an 0–4 record. In the 2018 U18 Newfoundland & Labrador Provincial Championships, Krats finished the competition in third place with a 3–2 record.

For 2019, Krats stayed with the same rink for a second year. The first tournament of the year that he competed in was the 2019 U21 Newfoundland & Labrador Provincial Championship where for a second year in a row he finished last. This time though, he finished with a 0–6 record. The only other tournament that he competed in with the Gander trio was the U18 Newfoundland & Labrador Provincial Championship. He went through the round robin of competition with a record of 5-1 which would send him to the semi-finals. There, he would beat his old team of Elisha Smith to send his team to the finals. There, he would come out victorious after beating the rink of Nathan Young 7–5. This qualified Krats for his first ever national event where he would compete at the 2019 Canadian U18 Curling Championships and finish with a 1–5 record, only beating Team Josh Nowlan of New Brunswick.

For 2020, Krats would leave the Davidge rink and go over to join and play second for Daniel Bruce. In the 2020 U21 Newfoundland & Labrador Provincial Championships, the Bruce rink would find themselves going 6–0 in the round robin and Krats would find himself going to the 2020 Canadian Junior Curling Championships. Here they would go on an infamous 5–1 run that would help send him to Newfoundland & Labrador's first appearance in the finals since Brad Gushue. Here, they would finish second to Jacques Gauthier of Manitoba. Krats would also find himself joining the Nathan Young rink for the U18 tournament as Ben Stringer had aged out of competition. He would help Young win the provincial championship by defeating the team of Liam Quinlan 8–1 in the finals. They would not get to go to the national competition though as it got cancelled due to the COVID-19 pandemic. Towards the end of 2020, Krats would get the opportunity to compete with 3-time brier champion Brad Gushue as his lead Geoff Walker was unable to compete in events in Atlantic Canada.

For 2021, it was announced that Ryan McNeil Lamswood and Joel Krats would get the amazing opportunity to compete in the 2021 World Junior Curling Championships alongside members of the Alberta rink that finished third in 2020. This would unfortunately get cancelled, once again due to the COVID-19 pandemic still on the rise. The pandemic also shuttered Krats' original team plans as the duo was supposed to compete provincially with the duo of Alex McDonah and Adam Currie. But since they were from Nova Scotia, they were unable to move to Newfoundland & Labrador for competition. This prompted McNeil Lamswood and Krats to compete with James Trickett and Nathan King. This quartet would go on to compete in the 2021 Newfoundland & Labrador Tankard where they would finish round robin with a 6–1 record and send themselves to the semi-final. Here they would lose to Colin Thomas and eliminate themselves from competition.

In 2022, Krats announced that he would be leaving Newfoundland & Labrador to go live and curl in Nova Scotia with the junior super-team of Owen Purcell. In their first major competition of the year, the 2021 World Junior Qualifiers, his team would win every game including the finals against Nathan Young to put themselves as Team Canada for the 2022 World Junior Curling Championships. He would also find himself returning to Newfoundland & Labrador for the 2022 Newfoundland & Labrador Tankard as an import player where he would once again compete with McNeil Lamswood. They would fail to qualify for the playoffs and finish the tournament with a 3–5 record. In the 2022 World Junior Curling Championships, the Owen Purcell rink would end up finishing the round robin with a 6-3 record and defeating Norway's Grunde Burass 13-4 in the bronze medal game.

In 2023, Krats started off his curling campaign by competing in Nova Scotia's U21 Junior Curling Provincials. He skipped for the young Zachary Atherton rink. The team would go 1-3 in the preliminary round and fail to qualify for the championship round.

=== Mens ===
After graduating to mens play, Krats joined the James Grattan rink from New Brunswick as third during the 2023-24 curling season, where Krats would qualify for his first Brier, winning the 2024 New Brunswick Tankard by going undefeated in the tournament. At the 2024 Montana's Brier, the team finished with a 1-7 record.

== Personal life ==
Krats is currently a merchandising program manager at Goldline Curling. He lives in Dartmouth, Nova Scotia. He is married to fellow curler Mackenzie Mitchell

== Teams ==
Season	Skip	Third	Second	Lead
2017–18	Joel Krats	Ethan Davidge	Jared Davidge	Aaron Feltham
2018–19	Joel Krats	Ethan Davidge	Jared Davidge	Aaron Feltham
2019–20	Daniel Bruce	Ryan McNeil Lamswood	Joel Krats	Nathan King
2020–21	Ryan McNeil Lamswood	Joel Krats	James Trickett	Nathan King
2021–22	Owen Purcell	Joel Krats	Adam McEachren	Scott Weagle
2022–23	Owen Purcell	Joel Krats	Adam McEachren	Scott Weagle
2023–24	James Grattan	Joel Krats	Paul Dobson	Andy McCann
2024–25	James Grattan	Joel Krats	Paul Dobson	Andy McCann
2025–26	James Grattan	Joel Krats	Andy McCann	Noah Riggs
2026–27	Joel Krats	Ryan McNeil Lamswood	Daniel Bruce	Aaron Feltham
