= 2023 Newfoundland and Labrador Tankard =

- Host city: St. John's, Newfoundland and Labrador
- Arena: RE/MAX Centre
- Dates: January 25–29
- Winner: Team Young
- Curling club: RE/MAX Centre, St. John's
- Skip: Nathan Young
- Third: Sam Follett
- Second: Nathan Locke
- Lead: Ben Stringer
- Alternate: Nicholas Codner
- Coach: Jeff Thomas
- Finalist: Greg Smith

The 2023 Newfoundland and Labrador Tankard, the men's provincial curling championship for Newfoundland and Labrador, was held from January 25 to 29 at the RE/MAX Centre in St. John's, Newfoundland and Labrador. The event was held in conjunction with the 2023 Newfoundland and Labrador Scotties Tournament of Hearts, the provincial women's championship.

The winning Nathan Young rink represented Newfoundland and Labrador at the 2023 Tim Hortons Brier in London, Ontario finishing seventh in Pool A with a 2–6 record.

== Teams ==
The teams are listed as follows:

Skip	Third	Second	Lead	Alternate	Club
Ryan McNeil Lamswood	Daniel Bruce	Graeme Weagle	Aaron Feltham		RE/MAX Centre, St. John's
Sean O'Leary	Andrew Trickett	Dylan Hancock	Jake Young	Jack Furlong	RE/MAX Centre, St. John's
Ken Peddigrew	David Noftall	Andrew Manuel	Craig Dowden	Evan Kearley	RE/MAX Centre, St. John's
Cory Schuh (Fourth)	Trent Skanes (Skip)	Spencer Wicks	Mike Mosher		RE/MAX Centre, St. John's
Greg Smith	Adam Boland	Chris Ford	Zach Young		RE/MAX Centre, St. John's
Andrew Symonds	Colin Thomas	Stephen Trickett	Keith Jewer		RE/MAX Centre, St. John's
Dave Thomas	Travis Cormier	Floyd Francis	Murray Hupman		Gateway CC, Port aux Basques
Nathan Young	Sam Follett	Nathan Locke	Ben Stringer	Nicholas Codner	RE/MAX Centre, St. John's

== Round robin standings ==
After Draw 7

Key
Teams to Playoffs
Teams to Tiebreaker

Skip	W	L	PF	PA	EW	EL	BE	SE
Nathan Young	6	1	51	25	26	21	8	8
Ryan McNeil Lamswood	5	2	50	32	25	23	4	8
Greg Smith	4	3	46	43	28	26	1	8
Andrew Symonds	4	3	51	32	28	21	5	8
Trent Skanes	3	4	41	43	28	26	5	10
Sean O'Leary	2	4	30	39	18	19	4	5
Ken Peddigrew	2	4	28	49	20	23	3	7
Dave Thomas	1	6	21	55	17	31	4	3

== Round robin results ==
All draws are listed in Newfoundland Time (UTC−03:30).

=== Draw 1 ===
Wednesday, January 25, 1:30 pm

Sheet 1	1	2	3	4	5	6	7	8	9	10	Final
Ryan McNeil Lamswood	1	1	3	0	0	3	0	X	X	X	8
Dave Thomas	0	0	0	1	0	0	1	X	X	X	2

Sheet 2	1	2	3	4	5	6	7	8	9	10	Final
Sean O'Leary	0	0	0	1	0	0	1	0	1	X	3
Nathan Young	0	3	0	0	0	1	0	1	0	X	5

Sheet 3	1	2	3	4	5	6	7	8	9	10	Final
Trent Skanes	1	0	1	0	0	2	0	0	2	0	6
Andrew Symonds	0	3	0	2	0	0	0	3	0	1	9

Sheet 4	1	2	3	4	5	6	7	8	9	10	11	Final
Ken Peddigrew	1	0	2	0	2	0	0	2	0	0	1	8
Greg Smith	0	2	0	1	0	1	0	0	1	2	0	7

=== Draw 2 ===
Wednesday, January 25, 7:00 pm

Sheet 1	1	2	3	4	5	6	7	8	9	10	Final
Sean O'Leary	0	0	0	0	1	0	X	X	X	X	1
Andrew Symonds	0	3	3	2	0	1	X	X	X	X	9

Sheet 2	1	2	3	4	5	6	7	8	9	10	Final
Ken Peddigrew	1	0	1	0	1	0	0	1	2	0	6
Dave Thomas	0	2	0	0	0	0	2	0	0	1	5

Sheet 3	1	2	3	4	5	6	7	8	9	10	Final
Ryan McNeil Lamswood	0	0	0	0	3	0	0	X	X	X	3
Greg Smith	2	1	0	2	0	3	3	X	X	X	11

Sheet 5	1	2	3	4	5	6	7	8	9	10	Final
Trent Skanes	0	0	1	0	0	0	1	1	1	1	5
Nathan Young	2	0	0	0	1	0	0	0	0	0	3

=== Draw 3 ===
Thursday, January 26, 1:30 pm

Sheet 1	1	2	3	4	5	6	7	8	9	10	Final
Trent Skanes	1	0	0	1	0	1	0	1	0	0	4
Greg Smith	0	2	1	0	1	0	0	0	1	3	8

Sheet 2	1	2	3	4	5	6	7	8	9	10	Final
Ryan McNeil Lamswood	1	0	1	0	0	1	0	1	2	X	6
Andrew Symonds	0	1	0	1	0	0	2	0	0	X	4

Sheet 3	1	2	3	4	5	6	7	8	9	10	Final
Ken Peddigrew	0	0	0	1	0	1	1	2	0	0	5
Nathan Young	0	0	0	0	3	0	0	0	3	4	10

Sheet 5	1	2	3	4	5	6	7	8	9	10	Final
Sean O'Leary	1	0	3	1	0	2	0	2	X	X	9
Dave Thomas	0	2	0	0	0	0	2	0	X	X	4

=== Draw 4 ===
Thursday, January 26, 7:00 pm

Sheet 1	1	2	3	4	5	6	7	8	9	10	Final
Andrew Symonds	0	0	2	0	1	0	0	2	0	0	5
Nathan Young	0	1	0	2	0	2	0	0	2	2	9

Sheet 2	1	2	3	4	5	6	7	8	9	10	Final
Greg Smith	0	3	0	2	1	0	1	2	X	X	9
Dave Thomas	1	0	1	0	0	1	0	0	X	X	3

Sheet 3	1	2	3	4	5	6	7	8	9	10	Final
Sean O'Leary	0	1	0	0	0	2	0	0	X	X	3
Trent Skanes	2	0	3	1	0	0	1	2	X	X	9

Sheet 4	1	2	3	4	5	6	7	8	9	10	Final
Ryan McNeil Lamswood	0	2	0	4	1	2	X	X	X	X	9
Ken Peddigrew	1	0	1	0	0	0	X	X	X	X	2

=== Draw 5 ===
Friday, January 27, 1:30 pm

Sheet 1	1	2	3	4	5	6	7	8	9	10	Final
Trent Skanes	1	0	2	0	1	0	0	0	0	0	4
Dave Thomas	0	1	0	0	0	1	0	1	1	1	5

Sheet 2	1	2	3	4	5	6	7	8	9	10	Final
Nathan Young	0	1	0	1	0	2	1	1	X	X	6
Ryan McNeil Lamswood	0	0	1	0	1	0	0	0	X	X	2

Sheet 3	1	2	3	4	5	6	7	8	9	10	Final
Ken Peddigrew	0	0	0	0	0	3	0	X	X	X	3
Andrew Symonds	2	0	0	3	2	0	2	X	X	X	9

Sheet 5	1	2	3	4	5	6	7	8	9	10	Final
Sean O'Leary	0	1	3	0	6	1	X	X	X	X	11
Greg Smith	0	0	0	1	0	0	X	X	X	X	1

=== Draw 6 ===
Friday, January 27, 7:00 pm

Sheet 1	1	2	3	4	5	6	7	8	9	10	Final
Greg Smith	0	0	2	0	1	0	1	0	X	X	4
Nathan Young	0	2	0	2	0	1	0	4	X	X	9

Sheet 2	1	2	3	4	5	6	7	8	9	10	Final
Ken Peddigrew	0	0	2	1	1	0	0	0	X	X	4
Trent Skanes	2	2	0	0	0	0	4	1	X	X	9

Sheet 3	1	2	3	4	5	6	7	8	9	10	Final
Ryan McNeil Lamswood	0	3	2	0	4	0	2	X	X	X	11
Sean O'Leary	1	0	0	1	0	1	0	X	X	X	3

Sheet 4	1	2	3	4	5	6	7	8	9	10	Final
Andrew Symonds	0	1	2	0	2	2	3	X	X	X	10
Dave Thomas	0	0	0	1	0	0	0	X	X	X	1

=== Draw 7 ===
Saturday, January 28, 9:00 am

Sheet 1	1	2	3	4	5	6	7	8	9	10	Final
Sean O'Leary	0	0	1	0	2	0	1	0	2	0	6
Ken Peddigrew	0	0	0	1	0	1	0	2	0	3	7

Sheet 2	1	2	3	4	5	6	7	8	9	10	Final
Greg Smith	0	2	0	1	0	2	0	0	0	1	6
Andrew Symonds	1	0	1	0	1	0	0	1	1	0	5

Sheet 3	1	2	3	4	5	6	7	8	9	10	Final
Dave Thomas	0	0	0	1	0	X	X	X	X	X	1
Nathan Young	1	1	3	0	4	X	X	X	X	X	9

Sheet 5	1	2	3	4	5	6	7	8	9	10	Final
Ryan McNeil Lamswood	3	0	0	0	3	1	0	1	3	X	11
Trent Skanes	0	1	1	0	0	0	2	0	0	X	4

== Tiebreaker ==
Saturday, January 28, 1:30 pm

Sheet 3	1	2	3	4	5	6	7	8	9	10	11	Final
Andrew Symonds	0	0	0	2	0	0	0	2	0	2	0	6
Greg Smith	0	2	0	0	0	2	1	0	1	0	2	8

== Playoffs ==
Semifinal			Final
			1	Nathan Young	8
2	Ryan McNeil Lamswood	6	3	Greg Smith	6
3	Greg Smith	9

=== Semifinal ===
Saturday, January 28, 7:00 pm

Team	1	2	3	4	5	6	7	8	9	10	Final
Ryan McNeil Lamswood	0	0	0	2	0	0	2	0	2	0	6
Greg Smith	0	1	1	0	1	1	0	3	0	2	9

=== Final ===
Sunday, January 29, 2:00 pm

Team	1	2	3	4	5	6	7	8	9	10	Final
Nathan Young	1	1	0	2	0	0	0	3	0	1	8
Greg Smith	0	0	1	0	2	0	1	0	2	0	6

2023 Newfoundland & Labrador Tankard
(Newfoundland and Labrador)
Nathan Young
2nd Newfoundland & Labrador Provincial Championship title
