= 2026 Newfoundland and Labrador Tankard =

Canadian provincial men's curling championship

- Host city: St. John's, Newfoundland and Labrador
- Arena: RE/MAX Centre
- Dates: January 20–25
- Winner: Team Young
- Curling club: RE/MAX Centre, St. John's
- Skip: Nathan Young
- Third: Colin Thomas
- Second: Nathan Locke
- Lead: Ben Stringer
- Coach: Jeff Thomas
- Finalist: Simon Perry

The 2026 Newfoundland and Labrador Tankard, the men's provincial curling championship for Newfoundland and Labrador, was held from January 20 to 25 at the RE/MAX Centre in St. John's, Newfoundland and Labrador. The winning Nathan Young rink will represent Newfoundland and Labrador as the host team at the 2026 Montana's Brier in St. John's, Newfoundland and Labrador.

Having finished fourth on the CTRS standings for the 2024–25 season, Team Brad Gushue earned an automatic berth at the national championship. This means Newfoundland and Labrador will qualify two teams for the Brier.

== Teams ==
The teams are listed as follows:

Skip	Third	Second	Lead	Alternate	Coach	Club
Adam Boland	Stephen Trickett	Zach Young	Alex Smith		Rob Thomas	RE/MAX Centre, St. John's
Barry Coady	Mitchell Ryall	James Efford	Jeremy Babstock			RE/MAX Centre, St. John's
Ty Dilello	Ryan McNeil Lamswood	Daniel Bruce	Aaron Feltham			RE/MAX Centre, St. John's
Brandon Gillespie	Owen Cousins	Craig Hurley	Jamie Hynes			Goose Bay CC, Happy Valley-Goose Bay
Simon Perry	Nicholas Codner	Brayden Snow	Carter Holden		Glenn Goss	RE/MAX Centre, St. John's
Evan Kearley (Fourth)	Scott Eaton	Shawn Hawco	Kenny Saunders (Skip)	Dylan Hancock	Shawn Kearley	RE/MAX Centre, St. John's
Cory Schuh	Scott McDonald	Spencer Wicks	Mike Mosher			RE/MAX Centre, St. John's
Greg Smith	Carter Small	Scott Saccary	Sean O'Leary		Leslie Anne Walsh	RE/MAX Centre, St. John's
Andrew Symonds	Trent Skanes	Chris Ford	Keith Jewer			RE/MAX Centre, St. John's
Parker Tipple	Spencer Tipple	Jack Kinsella	Jacob Hatcher			RE/MAX Centre, St. John's
Nathan Young	Colin Thomas	Nathan Locke	Ben Stringer		Jeff Thomas	RE/MAX Centre, St. John's

== Knockout brackets ==
=== A Event ===
First Knockout	A Qualifier
Simon Perry	7
Andrew Symonds	4
Simon Perry	7
Parker Tipple	3
Ty Dilello	3
Parker Tipple	8	Parker Tipple	4
Barry Coady	4	Simon Perry	4
Nathan Young	6
Greg Smith	3
Nathan Young	13	Nathan Young	7
Brandon Gillespie	2	Nathan Young	7
Cory Schuh	5
Adam Boland	2
Cory Schuh	8	Cory Schuh	11
Kenny Saunders	3

=== B Event ===
Second Knockout	B Qualifier
Simon Perry	4
Brandon Gillespie	3
Cory Schuh	7	Cory Schuh	10
Andrew Symonds	8
Andrew Symonds	5	Andrew Symonds	5
Ty Dilello	4	Cory Schuh	7
Kenny Saunders	3
Nathan Young	6
Ty Dilello	11
Nathan Young	9
Parker Tipple	5	Adam Boland	6
Adam Boland	9	Adam Boland	6
Greg Smith	5
Barry Coady	4
Greg Smith	9

=== C Event ===
Third Knockout	C Qualifier
Nathan Young	4
Simon Perry	7	Simon Perry	7
Parker Tipple	2	Ty Dilello	3	Simon Perry	8
Barry Coady	1	Ty Dilello	11	Greg Smith	6
Ty Dilello	10	Cory Schuh	3
Adam Boland	3	Greg Smith	10
Andrew Symonds	3	Greg Smith	11
Greg Smith	5	Greg Smith	9
Brandon Gillespie	3	Kenny Saunders	4
Kenny Saunders	4

== Knockout results ==
All draws are listed in Newfoundland Time (UTC−03:30).

=== Draw 1 ===
Tuesday, January 20, 7:00 pm

Sheet 2	1	2	3	4	5	6	7	8	9	10	Final
Cory Schuh	0	1	0	0	2	1	0	3	1	X	8
Kenny Saunders	0	0	0	1	0	0	2	0	0	X	3

Sheet 3	1	2	3	4	5	6	7	8	9	10	Final
Parker Tipple	0	2	0	2	0	1	0	2	1	X	8
Barry Coady	0	0	1	0	2	0	1	0	0	X	4

Sheet 4	1	2	3	4	5	6	7	8	9	10	Final
Nathan Young	3	2	0	1	0	4	3	X	X	X	13
Brandon Gillespie	0	0	1	0	1	0	0	X	X	X	2

=== Draw 2 ===
Wednesday, January 21, 1:30 pm

Sheet 2	1	2	3	4	5	6	7	8	9	10	Final
Ty Dilello	0	0	0	0	0	2	0	0	1	0	3
Parker Tipple	0	0	0	0	1	0	1	1	0	1	4

Sheet 3	1	2	3	4	5	6	7	8	9	10	Final
Greg Smith	0	0	0	1	1	0	1	0	0	0	3
Nathan Young	0	1	1	0	0	1	0	1	0	3	7

Sheet 4	1	2	3	4	5	6	7	8	9	10	Final
Simon Perry	0	0	0	1	1	0	0	2	0	3	7
Andrew Symonds	0	1	1	0	0	1	0	0	1	0	4

Sheet 5	1	2	3	4	5	6	7	8	9	10	Final
Adam Boland	0	1	0	1	0	0	X	X	X	X	2
Cory Schuh	2	0	2	0	2	5	X	X	X	X	11

=== Draw 3 ===
Wednesday, January 21, 7:00 pm

Sheet 2	1	2	3	4	5	6	7	8	9	10	Final
Brandon Gillespie	0	0	1	0	1	0	1	X	X	X	3
Andrew Symonds	1	2	0	4	0	1	0	X	X	X	8

Sheet 3	1	2	3	4	5	6	7	8	9	10	Final
Kenny Saunders	0	1	0	0	2	0	0	0	X	X	3
Ty Dilello	2	0	2	2	0	1	1	3	X	X	11

Sheet 4	1	2	3	4	5	6	7	8	9	10	Final
Barry Coady	0	1	0	2	0	0	1	0	0	X	4
Greg Smith	2	0	1	0	1	1	0	1	3	X	9

=== Draw 4 ===
Thursday, January 22, 1:30 pm

Sheet 2	1	2	3	4	5	6	7	8	9	10	Final
Adam Boland	2	1	0	0	0	2	1	0	2	1	9
Greg Smith	0	0	1	1	0	0	0	3	0	0	5

Sheet 3	1	2	3	4	5	6	7	8	9	10	Final
Nathan Young	1	1	0	0	0	1	0	1	0	3	7
Cory Schuh	0	0	0	1	2	0	1	0	1	0	5

Sheet 4	1	2	3	4	5	6	7	8	9	10	Final
Andrew Symonds	0	1	0	1	1	0	1	0	0	1	5
Ty Dilello	1	0	1	0	0	1	0	0	1	0	4

Sheet 5	1	2	3	4	5	6	7	8	9	10	Final
Simon Perry	0	2	1	0	2	0	0	0	2	X	7
Parker Tipple	0	0	0	1	0	2	0	0	0	X	3

Sheet 6	1	2	3	4	5	6	7	8	9	10	Final
Brandon Gillespie	0	0	0	1	0	0	0	1	0	1	3
Kenny Saunders	0	0	1	0	0	2	1	0	0	0	4

=== Draw 5 ===
Thursday, January 22, 7:00 pm

Sheet 2	1	2	3	4	5	6	7	8	9	10	Final
Cory Schuh	0	0	2	2	0	0	1	0	2	X	7
Andrew Symonds	0	0	0	0	3	1	0	1	0	X	5

Sheet 3	1	2	3	4	5	6	7	8	9	10	Final
Parker Tipple	2	0	0	0	2	0	0	0	1	X	5
Adam Boland	0	1	1	0	0	2	1	1	0	X	6

Sheet 4	1	2	3	4	5	6	7	8	9	10	Final
Simon Perry	0	0	2	0	0	0	1	0	1	0	4
Nathan Young	0	1	0	1	0	2	0	1	0	1	6

Sheet 5	1	2	3	4	5	6	7	8	9	10	Final
Greg Smith	0	2	0	0	1	0	1	0	0	1	5
Kenny Saunders	0	0	1	0	0	1	0	1	1	0	4

Sheet 6	1	2	3	4	5	6	7	8	9	10	Final
Barry Coady	0	0	0	1	0	X	X	X	X	X	1
Ty Dilello	1	2	5	0	2	X	X	X	X	X	10

=== Draw 6 ===
Friday, January 23, 1:30 pm

Sheet 2	1	2	3	4	5	6	7	8	9	10	Final
Parker Tipple	2	0	0	0	0	0	0	X	X	X	2
Ty Dilello	0	2	0	2	1	2	4	X	X	X	11

Sheet 3	1	2	3	4	5	6	7	8	9	10	Final
Simon Perry	0	0	2	0	0	2	0	0	X	X	4
Cory Schuh	1	2	0	3	1	0	0	3	X	X	10

Sheet 4	1	2	3	4	5	6	7	8	9	10	Final
Andrew Symonds	0	1	0	0	1	0	0	1	0	0	3
Greg Smith	0	0	2	1	0	1	0	0	1	4	9

Sheet 5	1	2	3	4	5	6	7	8	9	10	Final
Nathan Young	0	0	2	0	0	2	0	2	1	2	9
Adam Boland	1	0	0	1	1	0	3	0	0	0	6

=== Draw 7 ===
Friday, January 23, 7:00 pm

Sheet 3	1	2	3	4	5	6	7	8	9	10	Final
Adam Boland	1	0	0	1	0	1	0	0	X	X	3
Greg Smith	0	3	1	0	3	0	1	3	X	X	11

Sheet 4	1	2	3	4	5	6	7	8	9	10	Final
Cory Schuh	0	0	0	2	1	0	2	0	0	2	7
Nathan Young	0	1	2	0	0	1	0	1	1	0	6

Sheet 5	1	2	3	4	5	6	7	8	9	10	Final
Simon Perry	1	0	1	3	0	0	0	1	1	X	7
Ty Dilello	0	2	0	0	1	0	0	0	0	X	3

=== Draw 8 ===
Saturday, January 24, 1:30 pm

Sheet 3	1	2	3	4	5	6	7	8	9	10	Final
Nathan Young	0	0	0	1	0	1	1	0	1	0	4
Simon Perry	0	2	2	0	1	0	0	1	0	1	7

Sheet 5	1	2	3	4	5	6	7	8	9	10	Final
Cory Schuh	0	0	2	0	0	1	0	0	X	X	3
Greg Smith	3	1	0	2	0	0	2	2	X	X	10

=== Draw 9 ===
Saturday, January 24, 7:00 pm

Sheet 4	1	2	3	4	5	6	7	8	9	10	Final
Simon Perry	0	1	0	2	0	2	0	2	0	1	8
Greg Smith	0	0	1	0	3	0	0	0	2	0	6

== Playoffs ==
Semifinal			Final
			A	Nathan Young	5
B	Cory Schuh	6	C	Simon Perry	4
C	Simon Perry	8

=== Semifinal ===
Sunday, January 25, 9:00 am

Sheet 4	1	2	3	4	5	6	7	8	9	10	11	Final
Cory Schuh	0	2	0	0	2	0	0	2	0	0	0	6
Simon Perry	0	0	1	0	0	1	1	0	2	1	2	8

=== Final ===
Sunday, January 25, 2:15 pm

Sheet 4	1	2	3	4	5	6	7	8	9	10	Final
Nathan Young	0	0	2	0	0	0	0	1	0	2	5
Simon Perry	0	0	0	2	1	0	0	0	1	0	4

2026 Newfoundland & Labrador Tankard
(Newfoundland and Labrador)
Nathan Young
3rd Newfoundland & Labrador Provincial Championship title
