= 2023 Tim Hortons Brier =

Canada's men's curling championship

- Host city: London, Ontario
- Arena: Budweiser Gardens
- Dates: March 3–12
- Attendance: 95,338
- Winner: Canada
- Curling club: St. John's CC, St. John's
- Skip: Brad Gushue
- Third: Mark Nichols
- Second: E.J. Harnden
- Lead: Geoff Walker
- Coach: Caleb Flaxey
- Finalist: Manitoba (Matt Dunstone)

The 2023 Tim Hortons Brier, Canada's national men's curling championship, was held from March 3 to 12 at the Budweiser Gardens in London, Ontario. The defending champion Team Canada rink, skipped by Brad Gushue won the event, and would go on to represent Canada at the 2023 World Men's Curling Championship on home soil at TD Place Arena in Ottawa, Ontario, where they won a silver medal. It was a record fifth Brier title as a skip for Gushue.

Brad Gushue and his team won the 2022 edition and entered as the reigning Team Canada. The event followed the same format at the past two editions that included Team Canada, the fourteen Canadian curling member associations and three Wild Card teams that are the top three teams that did not qualify from their provincial playdowns based on CTRS standings. The competition was held in three stages: all eighteen teams play in a round robin stage, from which six advance to the championship stage, from which four teams advance to the final playoffs round.

This was the final Brier with Tim Hortons as the primary sponsor of the event.

== Summary ==
Prior to the event, Northern Ontario lead Colin Hodgson announced he would be retiring from team curling at the end of the season. Hodgson would cap off his career in his final game by curling a perfect game in a 7–5 loss to Wild Card 1 in the Championship round.

In Draw 2, Nunavut, skipped by Jake Higgs won its first ever game at the Brier when it defeated Newfoundland and Labrador 7–4. The territory had lost its previous 38 games since its first appearance in 2018. The win was clinched when Newfoundland skip Nathan Young missed a double takeout in the 10th end.

Following the round robin portion, both undefeated Manitoba (skipped by Matt Dunstone) and 7–1 Team Canada (Brad Gushue) earned byes in the championship round after they won their groups. Following Manitoba, Team Alberta (Kevin Koe) finished second in Group A with a 7–1 record, then Northern Ontario (Darren Moulding) in third with a 6–2 record. In Group B, Wild Card #1 (Brendan Bottcher) finished second with a 7–1 record, followed by Ontario (Mike McEwen) who finished 6–2. Bottcher finished second behind Gushue due to having lost their round robin match against them. McEwen secured the third place spot by defeating Wild Card #3 (Karsten Sturmay) on his final shot in the final draw, avoiding a tiebreaker against Quebec.

In the championship round page qualifying games, Team Ontario took on Alberta, while Wild Card #1 took on Northern Ontario. In the Ontario–Alberta game, Ontario did not lead the game until McEwen's last shot, a double-takeout for two, to win the game 9–8. In the other game, Team Wild Card #1 dominated Northern Ontario to win 8–5. The games eliminated both Alberta and Northern Ontario, and put Ontario and Wild Card #1 into the page seeding round against Team Canada and Manitoba respectively.

In the page seeding games, Manitoba defeated Wild Card #1 thanks to a final shot "pistol" though a port by Matt Dunstone, to win 5–3. In the other game, the Brad Gushue-led Team Canada squad easily defeated the hometown Ontario team 9–3. With their wins, Manitoba and Canada will go to the 1 vs. 2 page playoff game, while Wild Card #1 and Ontario played each other in the 3 vs. 4 game.

In the 3 vs. 4 game, Team Wild Card #1 (Bottcher) controlled most of the game against Ontario (McEwen). The Bottcher rink got the game's only deuce in the sixth after McEwen ticked a guard and missed a double takeout, taking a 4–2 lead. McEwen also missed a runback in the ninth, leading to a steal for the Wild Card entry, cementing the game for Bottcher, giving them a 6–3 win. The win put Wild Card #1 into the semifinal against the loser of the 1 vs. 2 game, which would be Manitoba's Dunstone rink. The game would be the last of the season for Team McEwen, as they did not qualify for the remaining Grand Slams.

In the 1 vs. 2 game, Team Canada (Gushue) took on the undefeated Manitoba rink, skipped by Matt Dunstone. The teams exchanged deuces with Manitoba scoring two in the third, and Canada scoring two in the fourth. With the teams tied at four each after six, Dunstone blanked the next three ends to retain the hammer in the final end. On his final shot of the 10th, Dunstone had to make a perfect hit and stick on his own rock for the win, but the stone rolled a half-rock away instead, giving up a steal of one to Canada, and the game. With the win, Canada's Gushue rink earned a bye to the final, while Manitoba was forced to play in the semifinal against Wild Card #1.

In the semifinal, Manitoba rebounded from their loss the previous evening by defeating Wild Card #1's Brendan Bottcher 7–5. Tied 5–5 in the 10th end, and without the hammer, Dunstone came around two stones to sit shot on the side of the button on his last stone. Bottcher responded by coming up short on his draw attempt, giving up a steal of two. The win sent Manitoba into the final, and the Bottcher rink home with bronze medals.

The 2023 Brier final was a rematch of the 1 vs. 2 game between Team Canada's Brad Gushue and Manitoba's Matt Dunstone. With the hammer, Gushue blanked the first end, but was forced to draw to take one in the second after Manitoba was sitting three. Both teams proceeded to trade forces until the eighth, including in the sixth when Dunstone made a freeze, followed by a heavy draw by Gushue. With the game tied at three apiece, Gushue took a commanding lead by scoring three in the eighth, to take a 6–3 lead, the first multiple score in the game up to that point. Manitoba struggled in the end, with second Colton Lott flashing, and third B. J. Neufeld rubbing a stone on a freeze attempt. Dunstone himself had to make a hit and roll, but wasn't perfect enough, allowing Gushue a hit for three. Dunstone rebounded by scoring two in the ninth, to head into the last end down by one, without the hammer. On his last rock in the 10th, Dunstone made a tap to lie two. Gushue responded by drawing to the four-foot against to claim his career fifth Brier title in seven years, a record for skips. In total, there were 6,562 spectators on hand for the final.

With the win, Team Gushue took home $108,000, with Dunstone taking home $60,000 and Bottcher $40,000.

== Teams ==
The fourteen Canadian curling member associations held playdowns to determine who would represent their province or territory. Team Canada is represented by Team Brad Gushue, who were the winners of the 2022 Tim Hortons Brier. The three wild card teams were decided by the CTRS standings. The top three teams who did not already qualify from their playdowns, qualified.

Canada	Alberta	British Columbia
St. John's CC, St. John's Skip: Brad Gushue; Third: Mark Nichols; Second: E. J. Harnden; Lead: Geoff Walker	The Glencoe Club, Calgary Skip: Kevin Koe; Third: Tyler Tardi (Note: Team Alberta alternate Ted Appelman threw third stones in the last end of Draw 12.); Second: Brad Thiessen; Lead: Karrick Martin; Alternate: Ted Appelman	Victoria CC, Victoria Skip: Jacques Gauthier; Third: Sterling Middleton; Second: Jason Ginter; Lead: Alex Horvath; Alternate: Rick Sawatsky
Manitoba	New Brunswick	Newfoundland and Labrador
Fort Rouge CC, Winnipeg Skip: Matt Dunstone; Third: B. J. Neufeld; Second: Colton Lott; Lead: Ryan Harnden	Curl Moncton, Moncton Fourth: Jeremy Mallais; Skip: Scott Jones; Second: Brian King (Note: Team New Brunswick alternate Chris Jeffrey threw second stones in the last end of Draw 12.); Lead: Jared Bezanson; Alternate: Chris Jeffrey	RE/MAX Centre & St. John’s CC, St. John's Skip: Nathan Young; Third: Sam Follett (Note: Team Newfoundland and Labrador alternate Jeff Thomas threw third stones in Draw 2 as third Sam Follett was delayed returning from the 2023 Canada Winter Games.); Second: Nathan Locke; Lead: Ben Stringer (Note: Team Newfoundland and Labrador alternate Jeff Thomas threw lead stones in the last four ends of Draw 13.); Alternate: Jeff Thomas
Northern Ontario	Nova Scotia	Ontario
Northern Credit Union CC, Sudbury Fourth: Tanner Horgan; Skip: Darren Moulding; Second: Jacob Horgan; Lead: Colin Hodgson	Halifax CC, Halifax Skip: Matthew Manuel; Third: Luke Saunders; Second: Jeffrey Meagher; Lead: Nick Zachernuk; Alternate: Ryan Abraham	Royal Canadian CC, Toronto Skip: Mike McEwen; Third: Ryan Fry; Second: Brent Laing; Lead: Joey Hart
Prince Edward Island	Quebec	Saskatchewan
Crapaud Community CC, Crapaud Skip: Tyler Smith; Third: Adam Cocks; Second: Alex MacFadyen; Lead: Edward White	Glenmore CC, Dollard-des-Ormeaux, CS Belvédère, Val d'Or, CC Etchemin, Saint-Romuald & CC Valleyfield, Salaberry-de-Valleyfield Skip: Félix Asselin; Third: Martin Crête; Second: Émile Asselin; Lead: Jean-François Trépanier; Alternate: Pierre Charette	Highland CC, Regina Skip: Kelly Knapp; Third: Brennen Jones; Second: Mike Armstrong; Lead: Trent Knapp; Alternate: Dustin Kidby
Northwest Territories	Nunavut	Yukon
Yellowknife CC, Yellowknife Skip: Jamie Koe; Third: Glen Kennedy; Second: Cole Parsons (Note: Team Northwest Territories alternate Stephen Robertson threw second stones in the last end of Draw 9.); Lead: Shadrach McLeod; Alternate: Stephen Robertson	Iqaluit CC, Iqaluit Skip: Jake Higgs; Third: Sheldon Wettig (Note: For the final three ends of Draw 4, Team Nunavut lead Christian Smitheram (who was sitting out to start the game) threw second stones, second Brady St. Louis threw third stones and third Sheldon Wettig sat out.); Second: Brady St. Louis (Note: For the final end of Draw 15, Team Nunavut alternate Terry Lichty threw lead stones, lead Christian Smitheram threw second stones, and second Brady St. Louis sat out.); Lead: Christian Smitheram (Note: Team Nunavut alternate Terry Lichty threw lead stones in Draw 4 and Draw 12.); Alternate: Terry Lichty	Whitehorse CC, Whitehorse Skip: Thomas Scoffin; Third: Trygg Jensen; Second: Joe Wallingham (Note: Team Yukon alternate Wade Scoffin threw second stones in the last eight ends of Draw 5, all of Draw 7, the last end of Draw 12, the last seven ends of Draw 13, and all of Draw 18.); Lead: Evan Latos; Alternate: Wade Scoffin
(Alberta) Wild Card #1	(Manitoba) Wild Card #2	(Alberta) Wild Card #3
The Glencoe Club, Calgary & Saville Community SC, Edmonton Skip: Brendan Bottcher; Third: Marc Kennedy; Second: Brett Gallant; Lead: Ben Hebert (Note: Wild Card #1 alternate Paul Webster threw lead stones in the last end of Draw 1.); Alternate: Paul Webster	Morris CC, Morris Skip: Reid Carruthers; Third: Derek Samagalski; Second: Connor Njegovan; Lead: Rob Gordon; Alternate: Matt Lorenz	St. Albert CC, St. Albert Skip: Karsten Sturmay; Third: J. D. Lind; Second: Kyle Doering (Note: Team Wild Card #3's front-end rotated throughout the tournament.); Lead: Glenn Venance; Alternate: Kurtis Goller

=== CTRS ranking ===
As of February 13, 2023

Member Association (Skip)	Rank	Points
Manitoba (Dunstone)	1	280.250
(Alberta) Wild Card #1 (Bottcher)	2	273.000
Canada (Gushue)	3	244.500
Alberta (K. Koe)	4	223.750
(Manitoba) Wild Card #2 (Carruthers)	5	187.250
(Alberta) Wild Card #3 (Sturmay)	6	145.750
Saskatchewan (Knapp)	11	117.125
Ontario (McEwen)	12	111.875
Northern Ontario (Moulding)	13	111.500
Quebec (Asselin)	15	105.875
British Columbia (Gauthier)	16	103.250
Nova Scotia (Manuel)	38	53.500
Newfoundland and Labrador (Young)	39	49.875
New Brunswick (Jones)	72	27.375
Prince Edward Island (Smith)	79	22.500
Northwest Territories (J. Koe)	152	5.250
Nunavut (Higgs)	NR	0.000
Yukon (Scoffin)	NR	0.000

== Map of teams ==
Team Canada Provincial Winners Wild-Card Teams

== Wild card selection ==
Curling Canada included three wild card teams, continuing a process started with the 2021 Brier. The teams – skipped by Brendan Bottcher (Alberta), Reid Carruthers (Manitoba) and Karsten Sturmay (Alberta) – were the top three in the Canadian Team Ranking System standings who had not otherwise qualified by winning their provincial championship nor by being the reigning Team Canada champion.

CTRS standings for wild card selection (as of Feb 8)
Rank	Team	Member Association	Eligibility
1	~~Matt Dunstone~~	Manitoba	Won Manitoba provincials
2	Brendan Bottcher	Alberta	Eliminated from provincials
3	~~Brad Gushue~~	Newfoundland and Labrador	Pre-qualified for 2023 as Team Canada
4	~~Kevin Koe~~	Alberta	Won Alberta provincials
5	Reid Carruthers	Manitoba	Eliminated from provincials
6	Karsten Sturmay	Alberta	Eliminated from provincials

== Round robin standings ==
Final Round Robin Standings

Key
Teams to Championship Round

Pool A	Skip	W	L	PF	PA	EW	EL	BE	SE	S%	LSD
Manitoba	Matt Dunstone	8	0	80	27	41	18	4	17	88%	309.9
Alberta	Kevin Koe	7	1	60	39	34	30	9	9	87%	301.8
Northern Ontario	Darren Moulding	6	2	50	41	34	31	4	8	84%	321.1
Saskatchewan	Kelly Knapp	4	4	44	50	34	30	0	13	81%	584.0
(Manitoba) Wild Card #2	Reid Carruthers	4	4	51	47	34	31	8	8	83%	233.7
Nova Scotia	Matthew Manuel	3	5	46	50	32	34	2	9	83%	989.4
Newfoundland and Labrador	Nathan Young	2	6	40	58	28	40	1	7	76%	676.7
Northwest Territories	Jamie Koe	1	7	49	66	29	40	4	6	74%	520.7
Nunavut	Jake Higgs	1	7	28	70	24	37	6	4	71%	1005.4

Pool B	Skip	W	L	PF	PA	EW	EL	BE	SE	S%	LSD
Canada	Brad Gushue	7	1	61	42	35	32	6	6	88%	259.5
(Alberta) Wild Card #1	Brendan Bottcher	7	1	64	38	35	25	5	8	87%	296.4
Ontario	Mike McEwen	6	2	70	47	35	30	3	8	85%	322.3
Quebec	Félix Asselin	5	3	55	48	36	29	5	9	84%	537.1
British Columbia	Jacques Gauthier	3	5	55	53	33	33	3	9	84%	623.2
(Alberta) Wild Card #3	Karsten Sturmay	3	5	45	54	33	31	5	9	82%	585.5
Yukon	Thomas Scoffin	2	6	50	62	32	37	0	10	80%	777.1
Prince Edward Island	Tyler Smith	2	6	37	65	25	39	4	5	76%	865.4
New Brunswick	Scott Jones	1	7	48	76	30	38	4	6	76%	587.8

Pool A Round Robin Summary Table
Pos.	Team	(Alberta) AB	(Manitoba) MB	(Newfoundland and Labrador) NL	(Northern Ontario) NO	(Northwest Territories) NT	(Nova Scotia) NS	(Nunavut) NU	(Saskatchewan) SK	(Manitoba) WC2	Record
2	Alberta	—	5–9	6–4	7–4	10–6	5–4	10–1	8–4	9–7	7–1
1	Manitoba	9–5	—	13–3	9–2	10–4	8–4	14–2	9–3	8–4	8–0
7	Newfoundland and Labrador	4–6	3–13	—	4–6	8–7	8–5	4–7	3–7	6–7	2–6
3	Northern Ontario	4–7	2–9	6–4	—	10–6	7–4	6–4	9–3	6–4	6–2
8	Northwest Territories	6–10	4–10	7–8	6–10	—	5–8	9–3	5–6	7–11	1–7
6	Nova Scotia	4–5	4–8	5–8	4–7	8–5	—	10–4	9–7	2–6	3–5
9	Nunavut	1–10	2–14	7–4	4–6	3–9	4–10	—	3–9	4–8	1–7
4	Saskatchewan	4–8	3–9	7–3	3–9	6–5	7–9	9–3	—	5–4	4–4
5	(Manitoba) Wild Card #2	7–9	4–8	7–6	4–6	11–7	6–2	8–4	4–5	—	4–4

Pool B Round Robin Summary Table
Pos.	Team	(British Columbia) BC	(Canada) CAN	(New Brunswick) NB	(Ontario) ON	(Prince Edward Island) PE	(Quebec) QC	(Alberta) WC1	(Alberta) WC3	(Yukon) YT	Record
5	British Columbia	—	5–6	10–4	6–10	9–2	6–7	3–9	8–5	8–10	3–5
1	Canada	6–5	—	13–9	4–6	8–6	8–7	6–3	8–3	8–3	7–1
9	New Brunswick	4–10	9–13	—	4–11	8–9	4–11	7–8	3–7	9–7	1–7
3	Ontario	10–6	6–4	11–4	—	7–8	13–2	4–8	9–8	10–7	6–2
8	Prince Edward Island	2–9	6–8	9–8	8–7	—	4–7	2–8	4–9	2–9	2–6
4	Quebec	7–6	7–8	11–4	2–13	7–4	—	7–8	6–3	8–2	5–3
2	(Alberta) Wild Card #1	9–3	3–6	8–7	8–4	8–2	8–7	—	10–3	10–6	7–1
6	(Alberta) Wild Card #3	5–8	3–8	7–3	8–9	9–4	3–6	3–10	—	7–6	3–5
7	Yukon	10–8	3–8	7–9	7–10	9–2	2–8	6–10	6–7	—	2–6

== Round robin results ==
All draw times are listed in Eastern Time (UTC−05:00).

=== Draw 1 ===
Friday, March 3, 7:00 pm

Sheet A	1	2	3	4	5	6	7	8	9	10	Final
(Alberta) Wild Card #1 (Bottcher) 🔨	2	0	3	1	0	1	0	1	X	X	8
Prince Edward Island (Smith)	0	0	0	0	1	0	1	0	X	X	2

Sheet B	1	2	3	4	5	6	7	8	9	10	Final
New Brunswick (Jones) 🔨	0	0	1	0	0	1	0	1	0	X	3
(Alberta) Wild Card #3 (Sturmay)	2	1	0	0	2	0	1	0	1	X	7

Sheet C	1	2	3	4	5	6	7	8	9	10	Final
Canada (Gushue)	0	1	2	0	1	0	0	1	1	0	6
British Columbia (Gauthier) 🔨	1	0	0	1	0	1	1	0	0	1	5

Sheet D	1	2	3	4	5	6	7	8	9	10	Final
Ontario (McEwen) 🔨	2	0	0	0	2	4	5	0	X	X	13
Quebec (Asselin)	0	0	1	0	0	0	0	1	X	X	2

=== Draw 2 ===
Saturday, March 4, 2:00 pm

Sheet A	1	2	3	4	5	6	7	8	9	10	Final
Nunavut (Higgs) 🔨	0	2	0	1	0	1	0	1	1	1	7
Newfoundland and Labrador (Young)	1	0	1	0	1	0	1	0	0	0	4

Sheet B	1	2	3	4	5	6	7	8	9	10	Final
Saskatchewan (Knapp) 🔨	1	0	0	1	0	0	1	0	X	X	3
Manitoba (Dunstone)	0	1	1	0	0	4	0	3	X	X	9

Sheet C	1	2	3	4	5	6	7	8	9	10	Final
Alberta (K. Koe) 🔨	1	1	0	1	0	0	0	0	2	0	5
Nova Scotia (Manuel)	0	0	1	0	1	0	0	0	0	2	4

Sheet D	1	2	3	4	5	6	7	8	9	10	Final
Northern Ontario (Moulding) 🔨	0	2	0	0	0	2	0	1	0	1	6
(Manitoba) Wild Card #2 (Carruthers)	0	0	0	1	1	0	1	0	1	0	4

=== Draw 3 ===
Saturday, March 4, 7:00 pm

Sheet A	1	2	3	4	5	6	7	8	9	10	Final
Quebec (Asselin) 🔨	1	0	1	0	1	2	2	1	X	X	8
Yukon (Scoffin)	0	1	0	1	0	0	0	0	X	X	2

Sheet B	1	2	3	4	5	6	7	8	9	10	Final
Canada (Gushue) 🔨	3	0	0	0	0	0	1	0	0	X	4
Ontario (McEwen)	0	1	1	0	0	0	0	3	1	X	6

Sheet C	1	2	3	4	5	6	7	8	9	10	11	Final
New Brunswick (Jones)	1	0	0	1	3	0	1	0	2	0	0	8
Prince Edward Island (Smith) 🔨	0	3	2	0	0	2	0	1	0	0	1	9

Sheet D	1	2	3	4	5	6	7	8	9	10	Final
(Alberta) Wild Card #3 (Sturmay)	0	0	1	0	1	0	1	0	X	X	3
(Alberta) Wild Card #1 (Bottcher) 🔨	2	0	0	1	0	3	0	4	X	X	10

=== Draw 4 ===
Sunday, March 5, 9:00 am

Sheet A	1	2	3	4	5	6	7	8	9	10	Final
(Manitoba) Wild Card #2 (Carruthers) 🔨	1	0	0	1	0	3	0	2	2	2	11
Northwest Territories (J. Koe)	0	1	1	0	4	0	1	0	0	0	7

Sheet B	1	2	3	4	5	6	7	8	9	10	Final
Alberta (K. Koe)	0	1	0	1	1	0	1	0	3	X	7
Northern Ontario (Moulding) 🔨	1	0	1	0	0	1	0	1	0	X	4

Sheet C	1	2	3	4	5	6	7	8	9	10	Final
Saskatchewan (Knapp) 🔨	1	1	3	1	0	1	0	0	X	X	7
Newfoundland and Labrador (Young)	0	0	0	0	1	0	1	1	X	X	3

Sheet D	1	2	3	4	5	6	7	8	9	10	Final
Manitoba (Dunstone) 🔨	2	3	0	5	0	1	0	3	X	X	14
Nunavut (Higgs)	0	0	1	0	1	0	0	0	X	X	2

=== Draw 5 ===
Sunday, March 5, 2:00 pm

Sheet A	1	2	3	4	5	6	7	8	9	10	Final
New Brunswick (Jones)	0	2	0	0	2	0	2	0	3	0	9
Canada (Gushue) 🔨	1	0	2	1	0	4	0	2	0	3	13

Sheet B	1	2	3	4	5	6	7	8	9	10	Final
Prince Edward Island (Smith)	0	0	0	0	0	0	2	0	2	0	4
Quebec (Asselin) 🔨	0	0	0	2	1	1	0	2	0	1	7

Sheet C	1	2	3	4	5	6	7	8	9	10	Final
Ontario (McEwen) 🔨	0	1	0	0	1	0	0	2	0	X	4
(Alberta) Wild Card #1 (Bottcher)	0	0	0	1	0	4	1	0	2	X	8

Sheet D	1	2	3	4	5	6	7	8	9	10	Final
British Columbia (Gauthier)	3	0	0	2	1	0	0	2	0	0	8
Yukon (Scoffin) 🔨	0	1	0	0	0	3	3	0	2	1	10

=== Draw 6 ===
Sunday, March 5, 7:00 pm

Sheet A	1	2	3	4	5	6	7	8	9	10	Final
Saskatchewan (Knapp)	0	1	0	0	0	1	1	1	0	X	4
Alberta (K. Koe) 🔨	2	0	0	0	3	0	0	0	3	X	8

Sheet B	1	2	3	4	5	6	7	8	9	10	Final
Newfoundland and Labrador (Young)	0	0	3	0	0	1	0	0	2	X	6
(Manitoba) Wild Card #2 (Carruthers) 🔨	2	1	0	0	3	0	0	1	0	X	7

Sheet C	1	2	3	4	5	6	7	8	9	10	Final
Northern Ontario (Moulding)	0	2	1	0	1	0	0	1	0	1	6
Nunavut (Higgs) 🔨	1	0	0	1	0	1	1	0	0	0	4

Sheet D	1	2	3	4	5	6	7	8	9	10	Final
Nova Scotia (Manuel)	0	2	0	1	1	0	1	2	0	1	8
Northwest Territories (J. Koe) 🔨	1	0	2	0	0	1	0	0	1	0	5

=== Draw 7 ===
Monday, March 6, 9:00 am

Sheet A	1	2	3	4	5	6	7	8	9	10	Final
Prince Edward Island (Smith)	0	1	3	0	1	0	1	1	1	0	8
Ontario (McEwen) 🔨	2	0	0	2	0	2	0	0	0	1	7

Sheet B	1	2	3	4	5	6	7	8	9	10	Final
Nunavut (Higgs) 🔨	0	0	1	0	2	0	1	0	X	X	4
Nova Scotia (Manuel)	1	1	0	1	0	2	0	5	X	X	10

Sheet C	1	2	3	4	5	6	7	8	9	10	Final
Yukon (Scoffin) 🔨	0	1	0	1	1	0	0	0	1	2	6
(Alberta) Wild Card #3 (Sturmay)	1	0	2	0	0	1	1	2	0	0	7

Sheet D	1	2	3	4	5	6	7	8	9	10	11	Final
(Manitoba) Wild Card #2 (Carruthers) 🔨	1	1	0	2	0	2	0	0	0	1	0	7
Alberta (K. Koe)	0	0	4	0	1	0	1	0	1	0	2	9

=== Draw 8 ===
Monday, March 6, 2:00 pm

Sheet A	1	2	3	4	5	6	7	8	9	10	Final
Newfoundland and Labrador (Young)	0	0	1	1	0	0	0	0	2	0	4
Northern Ontario (Moulding) 🔨	1	1	0	0	0	1	0	1	0	2	6

Sheet B	1	2	3	4	5	6	7	8	9	10	Final
(Alberta) Wild Card #1 (Bottcher) 🔨	3	0	0	2	0	0	2	2	X	X	9
British Columbia (Gauthier)	0	0	2	0	1	0	0	0	X	X	3

Sheet C	1	2	3	4	5	6	7	8	9	10	Final
Northwest Territories (J. Koe)	0	0	3	0	0	1	0	0	X	X	4
Manitoba (Dunstone) 🔨	1	0	0	4	2	0	1	2	X	X	10

Sheet D	1	2	3	4	5	6	7	8	9	10	Final
Quebec (Asselin) 🔨	2	1	0	1	0	1	1	0	1	0	7
Canada (Gushue)	0	0	2	0	3	0	0	2	0	1	8

=== Draw 9 ===
Monday, March 6, 7:00 pm

Sheet A	1	2	3	4	5	6	7	8	9	10	Final
(Alberta) Wild Card #3 (Sturmay) 🔨	0	1	0	1	0	2	0	1	0	X	5
British Columbia (Gauthier)	0	0	2	0	1	0	2	0	3	X	8

Sheet B	1	2	3	4	5	6	7	8	9	10	Final
Northern Ontario (Moulding) 🔨	2	0	2	0	4	0	2	0	X	X	10
Northwest Territories (J. Koe)	0	2	0	2	0	1	0	1	X	X	6

Sheet C	1	2	3	4	5	6	7	8	9	10	Final
Prince Edward Island (Smith)	0	0	1	0	1	0	3	0	1	0	6
Canada (Gushue) 🔨	0	1	0	2	0	1	0	2	0	2	8

Sheet D	1	2	3	4	5	6	7	8	9	10	Final
Nunavut (Higgs)	0	1	0	0	2	0	0	0	X	X	3
Saskatchewan (Knapp) 🔨	3	0	3	0	0	1	1	1	X	X	9

=== Draw 10 ===
Tuesday, March 7, 9:00 am

Sheet A	1	2	3	4	5	6	7	8	9	10	Final
Manitoba (Dunstone) 🔨	1	0	0	2	0	3	1	0	1	X	8
Nova Scotia (Manuel)	0	1	0	0	3	0	0	0	0	X	4

Sheet B	1	2	3	4	5	6	7	8	9	10	Final
Ontario (McEwen) 🔨	2	0	3	0	1	3	0	0	1	X	10
Yukon (Scoffin)	0	1	0	3	0	0	2	1	0	X	7

Sheet C	1	2	3	4	5	6	7	8	9	10	Final
Newfoundland and Labrador (Young)	0	0	2	0	1	0	0	1	0	0	4
Alberta (K. Koe) 🔨	2	1	0	0	0	0	1	0	1	1	6

Sheet D	1	2	3	4	5	6	7	8	9	10	Final
(Alberta) Wild Card #1 (Bottcher)	0	0	2	0	4	1	0	0	0	1	8
New Brunswick (Jones) 🔨	0	4	0	1	0	0	0	2	0	0	7

=== Draw 11 ===
Tuesday, March 7, 2:00 pm

Sheet A	1	2	3	4	5	6	7	8	9	10	Final
Canada (Gushue)	0	0	1	1	1	0	2	0	1	X	6
(Alberta) Wild Card #1 (Bottcher) 🔨	0	1	0	0	0	1	0	1	0	X	3

Sheet B	1	2	3	4	5	6	7	8	9	10	Final
Nova Scotia (Manuel)	0	1	0	2	0	2	1	0	2	1	9
Saskatchewan (Knapp) 🔨	2	0	2	0	2	0	0	1	0	0	7

Sheet C	1	2	3	4	5	6	7	8	9	10	Final
(Alberta) Wild Card #3 (Sturmay)	0	0	1	0	1	0	0	0	1	X	3
Quebec (Asselin) 🔨	1	0	0	3	0	1	1	0	0	X	6

Sheet D	1	2	3	4	5	6	7	8	9	10	Final
Northwest Territories (J. Koe) 🔨	3	2	0	0	0	1	0	1	0	0	7
Newfoundland and Labrador (Young)	0	0	1	0	2	0	1	0	2	2	8

=== Draw 12 ===
Tuesday, March 7, 7:00 pm

Sheet A	1	2	3	4	5	6	7	8	9	10	Final
Alberta (K. Koe) 🔨	4	2	0	0	0	2	0	2	X	X	10
Nunavut (Higgs)	0	0	0	1	0	0	0	0	X	X	1

Sheet B	1	2	3	4	5	6	7	8	9	10	Final
British Columbia (Gauthier)	0	1	0	3	1	0	5	0	X	X	10
New Brunswick (Jones) 🔨	0	0	1	0	0	1	0	2	X	X	4

Sheet C	1	2	3	4	5	6	7	8	9	10	Final
Manitoba (Dunstone) 🔨	0	2	0	3	0	0	1	0	2	X	8
(Manitoba) Wild Card #2 (Carruthers)	0	0	1	0	1	0	0	2	0	X	4

Sheet D	1	2	3	4	5	6	7	8	9	10	Final
Yukon (Scoffin) 🔨	2	1	3	1	0	2	0	0	X	X	9
Prince Edward Island (Smith)	0	0	0	0	1	0	0	1	X	X	2

=== Draw 13 ===
Wednesday, March 8, 9:00 am

Sheet A	1	2	3	4	5	6	7	8	9	10	11	Final
British Columbia (Gauthier)	0	1	0	1	0	2	0	1	0	1	0	6
Quebec (Asselin) 🔨	0	0	1	0	2	0	1	0	2	0	1	7

Sheet B	1	2	3	4	5	6	7	8	9	10	Final
Manitoba (Dunstone) 🔨	2	3	3	0	2	0	2	1	X	X	13
Newfoundland and Labrador (Young)	0	0	0	1	0	2	0	0	X	X	3

Sheet C	1	2	3	4	5	6	7	8	9	10	Final
(Alberta) Wild Card #1 (Bottcher) 🔨	2	1	1	0	1	0	3	0	2	X	10
Yukon (Scoffin)	0	0	0	4	0	1	0	1	0	X	6

Sheet D	1	2	3	4	5	6	7	8	9	10	Final
Saskatchewan (Knapp)	0	0	1	0	0	2	0	0	0	X	3
Northern Ontario (Moulding) 🔨	0	1	0	4	1	0	1	1	1	X	9

=== Draw 14 ===
Wednesday, March 8, 2:00 pm

Sheet A	1	2	3	4	5	6	7	8	9	10	Final
Nova Scotia (Manuel)	0	0	1	0	0	0	1	0	0	X	2
(Manitoba) Wild Card #2 (Carruthers) 🔨	0	1	0	0	1	2	0	1	1	X	6

Sheet B	1	2	3	4	5	6	7	8	9	10	Final
(Alberta) Wild Card #3 (Sturmay)	0	1	1	0	3	1	0	3	X	X	9
Prince Edward Island (Smith) 🔨	0	0	0	3	0	0	1	0	X	X	4

Sheet C	1	2	3	4	5	6	7	8	9	10	Final
Nunavut (Higgs)	0	2	0	0	0	1	0	0	X	X	3
Northwest Territories (J. Koe) 🔨	1	0	1	0	2	0	3	2	X	X	9

Sheet D	1	2	3	4	5	6	7	8	9	10	Final
New Brunswick (Jones)	0	0	1	2	1	0	0	0	X	X	4
Ontario (McEwen) 🔨	4	1	0	0	0	3	2	1	X	X	11

=== Draw 15 ===
Wednesday, March 8, 7:00 pm

Sheet A	1	2	3	4	5	6	7	8	9	10	11	Final
Yukon (Scoffin)	0	0	1	1	2	0	0	1	0	2	0	7
New Brunswick (Jones) 🔨	0	1	0	0	0	3	1	0	2	0	2	9

Sheet B	1	2	3	4	5	6	7	8	9	10	Final
(Manitoba) Wild Card #2 (Carruthers) 🔨	2	1	0	0	3	0	2	0	X	X	8
Nunavut (Higgs)	0	0	1	1	0	1	0	1	X	X	4

Sheet C	1	2	3	4	5	6	7	8	9	10	Final
British Columbia (Gauthier)	0	1	0	1	0	3	0	0	1	0	6
Ontario (McEwen) 🔨	1	0	2	0	2	0	0	2	0	3	10

Sheet D	1	2	3	4	5	6	7	8	9	10	Final
Alberta (K. Koe) 🔨	0	4	0	1	0	0	0	0	0	X	5
Manitoba (Dunstone)	2	0	1	0	3	0	1	1	1	X	9

=== Draw 16 ===
Thursday, March 9, 9:00 am

Sheet A	1	2	3	4	5	6	7	8	9	10	11	Final
Northwest Territories (J. Koe) 🔨	0	0	0	1	2	0	2	0	0	0	0	5
Saskatchewan (Knapp)	0	1	0	0	0	1	0	1	1	1	1	6

Sheet B	1	2	3	4	5	6	7	8	9	10	Final
Quebec (Asselin) 🔨	2	0	2	0	0	2	0	0	1	0	7
(Alberta) Wild Card #1 (Bottcher)	0	2	0	0	1	0	2	1	0	2	8

Sheet C	1	2	3	4	5	6	7	8	9	10	Final
Nova Scotia (Manuel)	0	0	2	0	1	1	0	0	0	X	4
Northern Ontario (Moulding) 🔨	0	2	0	1	0	0	1	3	0	X	7

Sheet D	1	2	3	4	5	6	7	8	9	10	Final
Canada (Gushue) 🔨	0	1	0	3	0	2	0	2	X	X	8
(Alberta) Wild Card #3 (Sturmay)	0	0	1	0	1	0	1	0	X	X	3

=== Draw 17 ===
Thursday, March 9, 2:00 pm

Sheet A	1	2	3	4	5	6	7	8	9	10	Final
Northern Ontario (Moulding)	0	0	0	1	0	0	1	0	X	X	2
Manitoba (Dunstone) 🔨	2	2	1	0	2	1	0	1	X	X	9

Sheet B	1	2	3	4	5	6	7	8	9	10	Final
Northwest Territories (J. Koe)	0	3	0	1	1	0	0	0	1	0	6
Alberta (K. Koe) 🔨	2	0	1	0	0	1	2	1	0	3	10

Sheet C	1	2	3	4	5	6	7	8	9	10	Final
(Manitoba) Wild Card #2 (Carruthers) 🔨	0	2	0	1	0	0	0	0	1	0	4
Saskatchewan (Knapp)	1	0	1	0	1	0	0	1	0	1	5

Sheet D	1	2	3	4	5	6	7	8	9	10	Final
Newfoundland and Labrador (Young) 🔨	0	2	1	0	1	0	0	2	0	2	8
Nova Scotia (Manuel)	1	0	0	1	0	1	1	0	1	0	5

=== Draw 18 ===
Thursday, March 9, 7:00 pm

Sheet A	1	2	3	4	5	6	7	8	9	10	Final
Ontario (McEwen) 🔨	2	0	0	1	0	2	0	2	0	2	9
(Alberta) Wild Card #3 (Sturmay)	0	3	1	0	1	0	1	0	2	0	8

Sheet B	1	2	3	4	5	6	7	8	9	10	Final
Yukon (Scoffin) 🔨	0	1	0	0	1	0	1	0	X	X	3
Canada (Gushue)	2	0	0	2	0	3	0	1	X	X	8

Sheet C	1	2	3	4	5	6	7	8	9	10	Final
Quebec (Asselin) 🔨	2	0	2	0	0	3	4	0	X	X	11
New Brunswick (Jones)	0	1	0	1	1	0	0	1	X	X	4

Sheet D	1	2	3	4	5	6	7	8	9	10	Final
Prince Edward Island (Smith)	0	0	0	0	1	0	1	0	X	X	2
British Columbia (Gauthier) 🔨	2	1	3	2	0	0	0	1	X	X	9

== Championship round ==
Semifinals
B2	(Alberta) Wild Card #1	8
A3	Northern Ontario	5
A2	Alberta	8
B3	Ontario	9

Finals
A1	Manitoba	5
B2	(Alberta) Wild Card #1	3
B1	Canada	9
B3	Ontario	3

=== Semifinals ===
Friday, March 10, 1:00 pm

Sheet C	1	2	3	4	5	6	7	8	9	10	Final
Alberta (K. Koe) 🔨	0	0	3	0	2	0	2	0	1	0	8
Ontario (McEwen)	0	0	0	3	0	2	0	2	0	2	9

Player percentages
Alberta		Ontario	
Karrick Martin	80%	Joey Hart	86%
Brad Thiessen	78%	Brent Laing	88%
Tyler Tardi	88%	Ryan Fry	93%
Kevin Koe	79%	Mike McEwen	89%
Total	81%	Total	89%

Sheet D	1	2	3	4	5	6	7	8	9	10	Final
(Alberta) Wild Card #1 (Bottcher) 🔨	1	0	3	1	1	0	1	0	0	1	8
Northern Ontario (Moulding)	0	2	0	0	0	1	0	1	1	0	5

Player percentages
(Alberta) Wild Card #1		Northern Ontario	
Ben Hebert	90%	Colin Hodgson	100%
Brett Gallant	90%	Jake Horgan	91%
Marc Kennedy	93%	Darren Moulding	83%
Brendan Bottcher	89%	Tanner Horgan	80%
Total	90%	Total	88%

=== Finals ===
Friday, March 10, 7:00 pm

Sheet B	1	2	3	4	5	6	7	8	9	10	Final
Manitoba (Dunstone) 🔨	0	0	1	0	0	0	1	0	0	3	5
(Alberta) Wild Card #1 (Bottcher)	0	1	0	1	0	0	0	0	1	0	3

Player percentages
Manitoba		(Alberta) Wild Card #1	
Ryan Harnden	94%	Ben Hebert	99%
Colton Lott	89%	Brett Gallant	90%
B. J. Neufeld	79%	Marc Kennedy	95%
Matt Dunstone	80%	Brendan Bottcher	88%
Total	85%	Total	93%

Sheet D	1	2	3	4	5	6	7	8	9	10	Final
Ontario (McEwen)	0	2	0	0	0	0	1	0	X	X	3
Canada (Gushue) 🔨	0	0	3	3	2	0	0	1	X	X	9

Player percentages
Ontario		Canada	
Joey Hart	97%	Geoff Walker	98%
Brent Laing	77%	E. J. Harnden	86%
Ryan Fry	80%	Mark Nichols	84%
Mike McEwen	88%	Brad Gushue	88%
Total	85%	Total	89%

== Playoffs ==
Page playoff system
1	Manitoba	4
2	Canada	5
3	(Alberta) Wild Card #1	6
4	Ontario	3

Semifinal
1	Manitoba	7
3	(Alberta) Wild Card #1	5

Final
2	Canada	7
1	Manitoba	5

=== 1 vs. 2 ===
Saturday, March 11, 7:00 pm

Sheet C	1	2	3	4	5	6	7	8	9	10	Final
Manitoba (Dunstone) 🔨	1	0	2	0	1	0	0	0	0	0	4
Canada (Gushue)	0	1	0	2	0	1	0	0	0	1	5

Player percentages
Manitoba		Canada	
Ryan Harnden	94%	Geoff Walker	90%
Colton Lott	90%	E. J. Harnden	90%
B. J. Neufeld	81%	Mark Nichols	88%
Matt Dunstone	90%	Brad Gushue	94%
Total	89%	Total	90%

=== 3 vs. 4 ===
Saturday, March 11, 1:00 pm

Sheet C	1	2	3	4	5	6	7	8	9	10	Final
(Alberta) Wild Card #1 (Bottcher) 🔨	1	0	1	0	0	2	0	1	1	X	6
Ontario (McEwen)	0	1	0	1	0	0	1	0	0	X	3

Player percentages
(Alberta) Wild Card #1		Ontario	
Ben Hebert	96%	Joey Hart	89%
Brett Gallant	78%	Brent Laing	94%
Marc Kennedy	90%	Ryan Fry	88%
Brendan Bottcher	91%	Mike McEwen	76%
Total	89%	Total	87%

=== Semifinal ===
Sunday, March 12, 12:00 pm

Sheet C	1	2	3	4	5	6	7	8	9	10	Final
Manitoba (Dunstone) 🔨	0	2	0	0	2	0	1	0	0	2	7
(Alberta) Wild Card #1 (Bottcher)	0	0	2	1	0	2	0	0	0	0	5

Player percentages
Manitoba		(Alberta) Wild Card #1	
Ryan Harnden	95%	Ben Hebert	96%
Colton Lott	90%	Brett Gallant	85%
B. J. Neufeld	93%	Marc Kennedy	94%
Matt Dunstone	85%	Brendan Bottcher	83%
Total	91%	Total	89%

=== Final ===
Sunday, March 12, 7:00 pm

Sheet C	1	2	3	4	5	6	7	8	9	10	Final
Canada (Gushue) 🔨	0	1	0	1	0	1	0	3	0	1	7
Manitoba (Dunstone)	0	0	1	0	1	0	1	0	2	0	5

Player percentages
Canada		Manitoba	
Geoff Walker	85%	Ryan Harnden	91%
E. J. Harnden	86%	Colton Lott	75%
Mark Nichols	85%	B. J. Neufeld	79%
Brad Gushue	91%	Matt Dunstone	88%
Total	87%	Total	83%

== Statistics ==
=== Top 5 player percentages ===
Final Round Robin Percentages; minimum 6 games

Key
First All-Star Team
Second All-Star Team

Leads	%
WC1 Ben Hebert	95
(Canada) Geoff Walker	92
(Alberta) Karrick Martin	91
(Quebec) Jean-François Trépanier	91
(British Columbia) Alex Horvath	91

Seconds	%
WC1 Brett Gallant	90
(Ontario) Brent Laing	87
(Northern Ontario) Jake Horgan	85
(Manitoba) Colton Lott	85
(Alberta) Brad Thiessen	85

Thirds	%
(Manitoba) B. J. Neufeld	92
(Alberta) Tyler Tardi	88
(Ontario) Ryan Fry	85
(Northern Ontario) Darren Moulding (Skip)	85
(Canada) Mark Nichols	85
(British Columbia) Sterling Middleton	85

Skips	%
(Canada) Brad Gushue	89
(Manitoba) Matt Dunstone	88
(Alberta) Kevin Koe	85
WC1 Brendan Bottcher	82
(Ontario) Mike McEwen	81

=== Perfect games ===
Round robin and championship round only; minimum 10 shots thrown

Player	Team	Position	Shots	Opponent
Ben Hebert	(Alberta) Wild Card 1	Lead	14	Prince Edward Island
Colin Hodgson	Northern Ontario	Lead	20	(Alberta) Wild Card 1

== Awards ==
The awards and all-star teams are listed as follows:

=== All-Star teams ===
First Team
Position	Name	Team
Skip	Matt Dunstone	Manitoba
Third	B. J. Neufeld	Manitoba
Second	Brett Gallant	(Alberta) Wild Card 1
Lead	Ben Hebert	(Alberta) Wild Card 1

Second Team
Position	Name	Team
Skip	Brad Gushue	Canada
Third	Tyler Tardi	Alberta
Second	Brent Laing	Ontario
Lead	Geoff Walker	Canada

=== Ross Harstone Sportsmanship Award ===
The Ross Harstone Sportsmanship Award is presented to the player chosen by their fellow peers as the curler who best represented Harstone's high ideals of good sportsmanship, observance of the rules, exemplary conduct and curling ability.

Name	Position	Team
Kelly Knapp	Skip	Saskatchewan

=== Curling Canada Award of Achievement ===
- Scott Higgins, TSN

=== Hec Gervais Most Valuable Player Award ===
- Brad Gushue, skip, Team Canada

== Provincial and territorial playdowns ==
- 2023 Boston Pizza Cup (Alberta): February 8–12
- (British Columbia) 2023 BC Men's Curling Championship: January 11–15
- 2023 Viterra Championship (Manitoba): February 8–12
- 2023 New Brunswick Tankard: February 8–12
- 2023 Newfoundland and Labrador Tankard: January 25–29
- 2023 Northern Ontario Men's Provincial Curling Championship: January 25–29
- 2023 Northwest Territories Men's Curling Championship: February 1–6
- 2023 Nova Scotia Tankard: January 25–30
- 2023 Nunavut Brier Playdowns: December 16–18
- 2023 Ontario Tankard: January 24–29
- (Prince Edward Island) 2023 PEI Tankard: January 25–29
- 2023 Quebec Tankard: January 8–15
- 2023 SaskTel Tankard (Saskatchewan): February 1–5
- 2023 Yukon Men's Curling Championship: Were held January 13–16. Three teams entered: Team Scoffin (Thomas Scoffin, Trygg Jensen, Joe Wallingham, Evan Latos), Team Komlodi (Andrew Komlodi, Terry Miller, Peter Andersen, Doug Hamilton) and Team Mikkelsen (Dustin Mikkelsen, Alexander Peech, Brandon Hagen, Jamie Steeves and Rob Andison) Scoffin defeated Komlodi in the final, 6–4.
