= 2026 Montana's Brier =

Canada's men's curling championship

- Host city: St. John's, Newfoundland and Labrador
- Arena: Mary Brown's Centre
- Dates: February 27 – March 8
- Attendance: 143,100
- Winner: Manitoba (Dunstone)
- Curling club: Granite CC, Winnipeg
- Skip: Matt Dunstone
- Third: Colton Lott
- Second: E. J. Harnden
- Lead: Ryan Harnden
- Alternate: Jacob Horgan
- Coach: Caleb Flaxey
- Finalist: Alberta (K. Koe)

The 2026 Montana's Brier, Canada's national men's curling championship, was held from February 27 to March 8 at Mary Brown's Centre in St. John's, Newfoundland and Labrador. The winning Matt Dunstone rink will represent Canada at the 2026 World Men's Curling Championship at the Weber County Ice Sheet in Ogden City, Utah.

Notably, it is believed that this was the first Brier with a Black skip and a skip of Asian descent, with Jayden King, whose father is from Trinidad and Tobago, skipping team Ontario, and Cody Tanaka heading team British Columbia.

The event was also a "swan song" for 2006 Olympic gold medallist Brad Gushue who announced his retirement from competitive curling, and is playing in his final Brier on home ice. It was also a final Brier for Quebec's Jean-Michel Ménard, Martin Crête and Jean-François Trépanier as well as Manitoba's E. J. Harnden who all announced their retirements from the sport.

== Teams ==
A total of eighteen teams qualified for the 2026 Brier. The fourteen Canadian curling member associations held playdowns to determine who would represent their province or territory. Team Canada is represented by Team Brad Jacobs, who won the 2025 Montana's Brier. They are also fresh off winning gold medals at the 2026 Winter Olympics.

In a continuation of the 2025 qualifying format, the final three teams in the field pre-qualified for the 2026 Brier based on their 2024–25 Canadian Team Ranking Standings, which meant they bypassed the provincial qualifiers. These spots went to Teams Matt Dunstone, Mike McEwen and Brad Gushue.

The teams are listed as follows:

Canada	Alberta	British Columbia
The Glencoe Club, Calgary Skip: Brad Jacobs; Third: Marc Kennedy; Second: Brett Gallant; Lead: Ben Hebert (Note: For Draw 1, Team Canada lead Ben Hebert did not play due to illness and opted to only play with three players.); Alternate: Mike Caione	The Glencoe Club, Calgary Skip: Kevin Koe; Third: Tyler Tardi; Second: Aaron Sluchinski; Lead: Karrick Martin (Note: Team Alberta alternate Jacob Libbus threw lead stones in the last two ends of Draw 6 and the last end of Draw 14.); Alternate: Jacob Libbus	Kamloops CC, Kamloops & Tunnel Town CC, Delta Skip: Cody Tanaka (Note: For the final end of Draw 16, Team British Columbia alternate Sam Husdon threw second stones, second Mitchell Kopytko threw third stones, third Jared Kolomaya threw skip stones, while skip Cody Tanaka sat out.); Third: Jared Kolomaya (Note: For the final two ends of Draw 10, Team British Columbia alternate Sam Husdon threw lead stones, lead Coburn Fadden threw second stones, second Mitchell Kopytko threw third stones, while third Jared Kolomaya sat out.); Second: Mitchell Kopytko; Lead: Coburn Fadden; Alternate: Sam Husdon
Manitoba (Calvert)	New Brunswick	Newfoundland and Labrador (Young)
Heather CC, Winnipeg Skip: Braden Calvert; Third: Corey Chambers; Second: Kyle Kurz; Lead: Brendan Bilawka	Gage G&CC, Oromocto Skip: James Grattan (Note: For the final four ends of Draw 10, Team New Brunswick alternate Drew Grattan threw lead stones with skip James Grattan sitting out. All other players moved up one position.); Third: Joel Krats; Second: Andy McCann; Lead: Noah Riggs; Alternate: Drew Grattan	St. John's CC, St. John's Skip: Nathan Young; Third: Colin Thomas; Second: Nathan Locke; Lead: Ben Stringer (Note: Team Newfoundland and Labrador (Young) alternate Jeff Thomas threw lead stones in the final end of Draw 7.); Alternate: Jeff Thomas
Northern Ontario	Nova Scotia	Ontario
Northern Credit Union CC, Sudbury Fourth: Sandy MacEwan; Skip: Dustin Montpellier; Second: Olivier Bonin-Ducharme; Lead: Luc Ouimet (Note: Team Northern Ontario used a five-player rotation.); Alternate: Lee Toner	Halifax CC, Halifax Skip: Kendal Thompson; Third: Stuart Thompson; Second: Bryce Everist; Lead: Michael Brophy; Alternate: Adam McKerihen	Tillsonburg CC, Tillsonburg Skip: Jayden King; Third: Dylan Niepage; Second: Owen Henry; Lead: Victor Pietrangelo (Note: Team Ontario alternate Spencer Dunlop threw lead stones in the final end of Draw 7.); Alternate: Spencer Dunlop
Prince Edward Island	Quebec	Saskatchewan (Knapp)
Crapaud Community CC, Crapaud Skip: Tyler Smith; Third: Adams Cocks; Second: – (Note: Team Prince Edward Island is playing with only three players as their second Christopher Gallant is unable to play in the Brier due to work commitments.); Lead: Ed White	Glenmore CC, Dollard-des-Ormeaux, Curling des Collines, Chelsea, CC Etchemin, Saint-Romuald; Club Sports Belvédère, Val-d'Or & CC Valleyfield, Salaberry-de-Valleyfield Fourth: Félix Asselin; Skip: Jean-Michel Ménard; Second: Martin Crête; Lead: Jean-François Trépanier	Highland CC, Regina Skip: Kelly Knapp; Third: Brennen Jones; Second: Dustin Kidby; Lead: Mat Ring; Alternate: Trent Knapp
Northwest Territories	Nunavut	Yukon
Yellowknife CC, Yellowknife Skip: Jamie Koe; Third: Glen Kennedy; Second: Roland Robinson (Note: Team Northwest Territories alternate Cole Parsons threw second stones for the final three ends of Draw 14.); Lead: Shadrach McLeod; Alternate: Cole Parsons	Iqaluit CC, Iqaluit Skip: Derek Samagalski; Third: Sheldon Wettig (Note: Team Nunavut alternate David Aglukark threw third stones in the last end of Draw 9 and the final six ends of Draw 13.); Second: Christian Smitheram; Lead: Justin McDonell (Note: Team Nunavut alternate David Aglukark threw lead stones in the last end of Draw 5.); Alternate: David Aglukark	Whitehorse CC, Whitehorse Skip: Thomas Scoffin; Third: Kerr Drummond; Second: Trygg Jensen (Note: Team Yukon alternate Ben Robinson threw second stones for the final three ends of Draw 16.); Lead: Joe Wallingham; Alternate: Ben Robinson
Manitoba (Dunstone)	Saskatchewan (McEwen)	Newfoundland and Labrador (Gushue)
Granite CC, Winnipeg Skip: Matt Dunstone; Third: Colton Lott; Second: E.J. Harnden (Note: Team Manitoba (Dunstone) alternate Jacob Horgan threw second stones in the last end of Draw 8.); Lead: Ryan Harnden (Note: Team Manitoba (Dunstone) alternate Jacob Horgan threw lead stones in the last two ends of Draw 16.); Alternate: Jacob Horgan	Nutana CC, Saskatoon Skip: Mike McEwen; Third: Colton Flasch; Second: Kevin Marsh; Lead: Dan Marsh; Alternate: Brent Laing	St. John's CC, St. John's Skip: Brad Gushue; Third: Mark Nichols; Second: Brendan Bottcher; Lead: Geoff Walker (Note: Team Newfoundland and Labrador (Gushue) alternate Adam Casey threw lead stones for the final three ends of Draw 13.); Alternate: Adam Casey

=== CTRS Rankings ===
As of February 9, 2026

Member Association (Team)	Rank	Points
Manitoba (Dunstone)	1	319.425
Canada (Jacobs)	2	313.000
Saskatchewan (McEwen)	5	160.700
Ontario (King)	6	147.500
Alberta (K. Koe)	8	128.925
Manitoba (Calvert)	10	120.600
Saskatchewan (Knapp)	15	99.175
Newfoundland and Labrador (Gushue)	17	97.350
Quebec (Ménard)	20	77.850
New Brunswick (Grattan)	28	55.250
British Columbia (Tanaka)	47	27.325
Nova Scotia (Thompson)	57	24.938
Prince Edward Island (Smith)	60	23.050
Northern Ontario (MacEwan)	67	19.238
Yukon (Scoffin)	69	18.600
Newfoundland and Labrador (Young)	87	13.350
Nunavut (Samagalski)	113	6.600
Northwest Territories (J. Koe)	158	3.750

== Map of teams ==
Team Canada Pre-Qualified Teams Provincial Winners
Provincial winners that are in the same location as Team Canada or the Pre-Qualified teams are listed at the bottom

== Round robin standings ==
Final Round Robin Standings

Key
Teams to Championship Round

Pool A	Skip	W	L	W–L	PF	PA	EW	EL	BE	SE	S%	LSD
Newfoundland and Labrador (Gushue)	Brad Gushue	8	0	–	67	31	38	23	7	11	87%	8.27
Canada	Brad Jacobs	7	1	–	65	32	36	25	2	12	89%	17.11
Ontario	Jayden King	5	3	1–0	58	47	35	31	3	13	81%	47.11
Quebec	Jean-Michel Ménard	5	3	0–1	60	50	34	29	4	9	84%	16.24
Prince Edward Island	Tyler Smith	3	5	1–1	47	59	29	36	4	4	75%	21.35
Saskatchewan (Knapp)	Kelly Knapp	3	5	1–1	54	53	34	34	6	8	80%	28.84
Newfoundland and Labrador (Young)	Nathan Young	3	5	1–1	51	66	32	37	1	5	76%	48.39
Nova Scotia	Kendal Thompson	2	6	–	52	59	32	34	1	8	79%	18.57
Nunavut	Derek Samagalski	0	8	–	26	83	20	41	4	3	66%	34.51

Pool B	Skip	W	L	W–L	PF	PA	EW	EL	BE	SE	S%	LSD
Alberta	Kevin Koe	8	0	–	61	28	34	24	8	10	85%	16.47
Manitoba (Dunstone)	Matt Dunstone	7	1	–	55	31	30	26	9	5	89%	14.37
Manitoba (Calvert)	Braden Calvert	5	3	1–1	59	45	33	30	7	6	83%	15.36
Saskatchewan (McEwen)	Mike McEwen	5	3	1–1	58	46	32	28	6	8	84%	17.22
New Brunswick	James Grattan	5	3	1–1	53	49	35	32	2	7	80%	38.00
Northwest Territories	Jamie Koe	2	6	1–0	40	64	28	34	2	7	76%	44.39
Northern Ontario (MacEwan)	Dustin Montpellier	2	6	0–1	42	56	28	33	4	4	77%	38.68
Yukon	Thomas Scoffin	1	7	1–0	44	64	28	35	8	4	78%	34.43
British Columbia	Cody Tanaka	1	7	0–1	39	68	29	34	3	6	76%	38.69

Pool A Round Robin Summary Table
Pos.	Team	(Canada) CAN	(Newfoundland and Labrador) NL–G	(Newfoundland and Labrador) NL–Y	(Nova Scotia) NS	(Nunavut) NU	(Ontario) ON	(Prince Edward Island) PE	(Quebec) QC	(Saskatchewan) SK–K	Record
2	Canada	—	2–4	10–7	10–4	11–2	8–2	8–3	8–4	8–6	7–1
1	Newfoundland and Labrador (Gushue)	4–2	—	8–5	9–8	10–2	8–4	12–3	10–2	6–5	8–0
7	Newfoundland and Labrador (Young)	7–10	5–8	—	2–11	8–4	10–8	9–8	3–7	7–10	3–5
8	Nova Scotia	4–10	8–9	11–2	—	12–2	4–11	3–9	5–8	5–8	2–6
9	Nunavut	2–11	2–10	4–8	2–12	—	3–8	5–10	6–16	2–8	0–8
3	Ontario	2–8	4–8	8–10	11–4	8–3	—	8–3	8–7	9–4	5–3
5	Prince Edward Island	3–8	3–12	8–9	9–3	10–5	3–8	—	3–8	8–6	3–5
4	Quebec	4–8	2–10	7–3	8–5	16–6	7–8	8–3	—	8–7	5–3
6	Saskatchewan (Knapp)	6–8	5–6	10–7	8–5	8–2	4–9	6–8	7–8	—	3–5

Pool B Round Robin Summary Table
Pos.	Team	(Alberta) AB	(British Columbia) BC	(Manitoba) MB–C	(Manitoba) MB–D	(New Brunswick) NB	(Northern Ontario) NO	(Northwest Territories) NT	(Saskatchewan) SK–M	(Yukon) YT	Record
1	Alberta	—	11–4	8–2	7–6	9–4	8–2	6–3	6–4	6–3	8–0
9	British Columbia	4–11	—	4–8	4–9	2–8	3–11	8–3	10–11	4–7	1–7
3	Manitoba (Calvert)	2–8	8–4	—	3–6	7–8	8–4	12–5	9–4	10–6	5–3
2	Manitoba (Dunstone)	6–7	9–4	6–3	—	5–3	9–3	8–3	6–3	6–5	7–1
5	New Brunswick	4–9	8–2	8–7	3–5	—	8–6	9–4	4–10	9–6	5–3
7	Northern Ontario (MacEwan)	2–8	11–3	4–8	3–9	6–8	—	6–7	1–5	9–8	2–6
6	Northwest Territories	3–6	3–8	5–12	3–8	4–9	7–6	—	5–11	10–4	2–6
4	Saskatchewan (McEwen)	4–6	11–10	4–9	3–6	10–4	5–1	11–5	—	10–5	5–3
8	Yukon	3–6	7–4	6–10	5–6	6–9	8–9	4–10	5–10	—	1–7

== Round robin results ==
All draw times are listed in Newfoundland Time (UTC−03:30).

=== Draw 1 ===
Friday, February 27, 7:30 pm

Sheet A	1	2	3	4	5	6	7	8	9	10	Final
Newfoundland and Labrador (Young) 🔨	0	1	0	1	0	0	2	0	4	X	8
Nunavut (Samagalski)	1	0	1	0	0	0	0	2	0	X	4

Sheet B	1	2	3	4	5	6	7	8	9	10	Final
Newfoundland and Labrador (Gushue) 🔨	2	0	0	0	0	0	4	4	X	X	10
Quebec (Ménard)	0	0	1	0	0	1	0	0	X	X	2

Sheet C	1	2	3	4	5	6	7	8	9	10	Final
Ontario (King)	1	1	0	3	4	0	2	0	X	X	11
Nova Scotia (Thompson) 🔨	0	0	1	0	0	1	0	2	X	X	4

Sheet D	1	2	3	4	5	6	7	8	9	10	Final
Prince Edward Island (Smith) 🔨	2	0	0	0	0	0	0	1	X	X	3
Canada (Jacobs)	0	2	0	1	1	1	3	0	X	X	8

=== Draw 2 ===
Saturday, February 28, 2:30 pm

Sheet A	1	2	3	4	5	6	7	8	9	10	Final
Northwest Territories (J. Koe)	0	1	0	0	2	0	0	2	X	X	5
Saskatchewan (McEwen) 🔨	1	0	2	2	0	3	3	0	X	X	11

Sheet B	1	2	3	4	5	6	7	8	9	10	Final
Alberta (K. Koe) 🔨	1	0	0	0	2	0	4	1	X	X	8
Manitoba (Calvert)	0	0	0	1	0	1	0	0	X	X	2

Sheet C	1	2	3	4	5	6	7	8	9	10	Final
New Brunswick (Grattan)	0	0	0	0	1	0	1	0	0	1	3
Manitoba (Dunstone) 🔨	0	1	0	1	0	2	0	1	0	0	5

Sheet D	1	2	3	4	5	6	7	8	9	10	Final
Northern Ontario (MacEwan) 🔨	2	0	1	0	2	0	1	0	2	1	9
Yukon (Scoffin)	0	1	0	4	0	2	0	1	0	0	8

=== Draw 3 ===
Saturday, February 28, 7:30 pm

Sheet A	1	2	3	4	5	6	7	8	9	10	Final
Canada (Jacobs) 🔨	1	0	1	0	0	3	0	2	0	1	8
Saskatchewan (Knapp)	0	1	0	2	1	0	1	0	1	0	6

Sheet B	1	2	3	4	5	6	7	8	9	10	Final
Ontario (King) 🔨	2	0	1	0	2	2	1	0	X	X	8
Prince Edward Island (Smith)	0	1	0	1	0	0	0	1	X	X	3

Sheet C	1	2	3	4	5	6	7	8	9	10	Final
Newfoundland and Labrador (Gushue) 🔨	3	2	0	1	0	2	1	1	X	X	10
Nunavut (Samagalski)	0	0	0	0	2	0	0	0	X	X	2

Sheet D	1	2	3	4	5	6	7	8	9	10	Final
Quebec (Ménard) 🔨	0	3	0	0	1	0	2	0	1	X	7
Newfoundland and Labrador (Young)	0	0	1	0	0	1	0	1	0	X	3

=== Draw 4 ===
Sunday, March 1, 9:30 am

Sheet A	1	2	3	4	5	6	7	8	9	10	Final
Yukon (Scoffin) 🔨	0	0	1	0	2	0	0	3	0	1	7
British Columbia (Tanaka)	0	0	0	1	0	1	0	0	2	0	4

Sheet B	1	2	3	4	5	6	7	8	9	10	Final
New Brunswick (Grattan)	0	0	2	0	0	2	0	4	0	X	8
Northern Ontario (MacEwan) 🔨	0	2	0	0	1	0	2	0	1	X	6

Sheet C	1	2	3	4	5	6	7	8	9	10	Final
Alberta (K. Koe) 🔨	0	1	0	1	0	0	1	0	0	3	6
Saskatchewan (McEwen)	0	0	1	0	2	0	0	1	0	0	4

Sheet D	1	2	3	4	5	6	7	8	9	10	Final
Manitoba (Calvert) 🔨	0	2	3	0	2	0	5	0	X	X	12
Northwest Territories (J. Koe)	1	0	0	2	0	1	0	1	X	X	5

=== Draw 5 ===
Sunday, March 1, 2:30 pm

Sheet A	1	2	3	4	5	6	7	8	9	10	Final
Newfoundland and Labrador (Gushue) 🔨	2	0	1	0	2	0	1	0	2	X	8
Ontario (King)	0	1	0	1	0	1	0	1	0	X	4

Sheet B	1	2	3	4	5	6	7	8	9	10	Final
Nunavut (Samagalski)	0	0	1	0	0	0	1	0	X	X	2
Canada (Jacobs) 🔨	2	2	0	3	2	0	0	2	X	X	11

Sheet C	1	2	3	4	5	6	7	8	9	10	Final
Prince Edward Island (Smith)	0	2	0	0	2	0	2	0	2	0	8
Newfoundland and Labrador (Young) 🔨	1	0	1	1	0	2	0	1	0	3	9

Sheet D	1	2	3	4	5	6	7	8	9	10	Final
Nova Scotia (Thompson) 🔨	1	0	1	0	2	0	0	0	1	X	5
Saskatchewan (Knapp)	0	3	0	2	0	0	2	1	0	X	8

=== Draw 6 ===
Sunday, March 1, 7:30 pm

Sheet A	1	2	3	4	5	6	7	8	9	10	Final
Alberta (K. Koe)	2	0	3	0	1	1	0	0	2	X	9
New Brunswick (Grattan) 🔨	0	1	0	1	0	0	1	1	0	X	4

Sheet B	1	2	3	4	5	6	7	8	9	10	Final
Saskatchewan (McEwen)	2	0	1	0	2	1	0	4	X	X	10
Yukon (Scoffin) 🔨	0	1	0	1	0	0	3	0	X	X	5

Sheet C	1	2	3	4	5	6	7	8	9	10	11	Final
Northern Ontario (MacEwan)	2	1	0	0	1	0	0	0	0	2	0	6
Northwest Territories (J. Koe) 🔨	0	0	0	1	0	2	1	1	1	0	1	7

Sheet D	1	2	3	4	5	6	7	8	9	10	Final
Manitoba (Dunstone)	0	3	0	1	2	0	0	0	3	X	9
British Columbia (Tanaka) 🔨	1	0	1	0	0	1	1	0	0	X	4

=== Draw 7 ===
Monday, March 2, 9:30 am

Sheet A	1	2	3	4	5	6	7	8	9	10	Final
Nunavut (Samagalski)	0	2	0	1	0	1	1	0	0	X	5
Prince Edward Island (Smith) 🔨	1	0	3	0	2	0	0	1	3	X	10

Sheet B	1	2	3	4	5	6	7	8	9	10	Final
Newfoundland and Labrador (Young)	0	1	0	0	1	0	0	0	X	X	2
Nova Scotia (Thompson) 🔨	1	0	3	2	0	1	2	2	X	X	11

Sheet C	1	2	3	4	5	6	7	8	9	10	Final
Saskatchewan (Knapp) 🔨	0	2	0	1	0	0	2	0	2	0	7
Quebec (Ménard)	0	0	3	0	1	1	0	1	0	2	8

Sheet D	1	2	3	4	5	6	7	8	9	10	Final
Canada (Jacobs) 🔨	2	0	1	0	3	0	2	0	X	X	8
Ontario (King)	0	0	0	0	0	1	0	1	X	X	2

=== Draw 8 ===
Monday, March 2, 2:30 pm

Sheet A	1	2	3	4	5	6	7	8	9	10	Final
Saskatchewan (McEwen) 🔨	2	0	0	0	0	0	1	1	1	X	5
Northern Ontario (MacEwan)	0	1	0	0	0	0	0	0	0	X	1

Sheet B	1	2	3	4	5	6	7	8	9	10	Final
Northwest Territories (J. Koe)	0	1	0	0	1	0	0	1	X	X	3
Manitoba (Dunstone) 🔨	2	0	0	2	0	1	3	0	X	X	8

Sheet C	1	2	3	4	5	6	7	8	9	10	Final
British Columbia (Tanaka)	0	2	0	1	1	0	0	0	0	X	4
Manitoba (Calvert) 🔨	2	0	1	0	0	2	0	1	2	X	8

Sheet D	1	2	3	4	5	6	7	8	9	10	Final
Yukon (Scoffin)	0	0	1	1	0	0	3	0	1	0	6
New Brunswick (Grattan) 🔨	1	1	0	0	2	2	0	1	0	2	9

=== Draw 9 ===
Monday, March 2, 7:30 pm

Sheet A	1	2	3	4	5	6	7	8	9	10	Final
Quebec (Ménard)	0	0	2	1	1	0	1	0	1	2	8
Nova Scotia (Thompson) 🔨	0	2	0	0	0	1	0	2	0	0	5

Sheet B	1	2	3	4	5	6	7	8	9	10	Final
Prince Edward Island (Smith) 🔨	1	1	0	1	0	1	0	2	0	2	8
Saskatchewan (Knapp)	0	0	3	0	1	0	1	0	1	0	6

Sheet C	1	2	3	4	5	6	7	8	9	10	Final
Nunavut (Samagalski) 🔨	0	0	0	0	1	1	0	1	0	X	3
Ontario (King)	2	1	1	1	0	0	2	0	1	X	8

Sheet D	1	2	3	4	5	6	7	8	9	10	Final
Newfoundland and Labrador (Young) 🔨	1	0	2	0	0	0	1	0	1	X	5
Newfoundland and Labrador (Gushue)	0	2	0	1	2	1	0	2	0	X	8

=== Draw 10 ===
Tuesday, March 3, 9:30 am

Sheet A	1	2	3	4	5	6	7	8	9	10	Final
Manitoba (Calvert) 🔨	1	0	0	1	0	1	0	0	0	X	3
Manitoba (Dunstone)	0	1	0	0	2	0	2	0	1	X	6

Sheet B	1	2	3	4	5	6	7	8	9	10	Final
Northern Ontario (MacEwan) 🔨	2	0	2	3	0	3	0	1	X	X	11
British Columbia (Tanaka)	0	1	0	0	1	0	1	0	X	X	3

Sheet C	1	2	3	4	5	6	7	8	9	10	Final
Saskatchewan (McEwen) 🔨	2	2	3	0	1	0	2	0	X	X	10
New Brunswick (Grattan)	0	0	0	1	0	2	0	1	X	X	4

Sheet D	1	2	3	4	5	6	7	8	9	10	Final
Northwest Territories (J. Koe)	0	0	0	0	1	0	1	0	1	X	3
Alberta (K. Koe) 🔨	0	0	2	1	0	1	0	2	0	X	6

=== Draw 11 ===
Tuesday, March 3, 2:30 pm

Sheet A	1	2	3	4	5	6	7	8	9	10	Final
Ontario (King) 🔨	0	2	0	1	0	2	0	3	0	0	8
Newfoundland and Labrador (Young)	2	0	4	0	1	0	2	0	0	1	10

Sheet B	1	2	3	4	5	6	7	8	9	10	11	Final
Nova Scotia (Thompson)	0	2	0	3	0	1	0	0	0	2	0	8
Newfoundland and Labrador (Gushue) 🔨	2	0	1	0	2	0	0	1	2	0	1	9

Sheet C	1	2	3	4	5	6	7	8	9	10	Final
Quebec (Ménard) 🔨	1	0	2	0	0	0	1	0	0	X	4
Canada (Jacobs)	0	2	0	0	2	1	0	2	1	X	8

Sheet D	1	2	3	4	5	6	7	8	9	10	Final
Saskatchewan (Knapp)	3	2	0	0	0	0	2	1	X	X	8
Nunavut (Samagalski) 🔨	0	0	1	0	0	1	0	0	X	X	2

=== Draw 12 ===
Tuesday, March 3, 7:30 pm

Sheet A	1	2	3	4	5	6	7	8	9	10	Final
New Brunswick (Grattan) 🔨	2	0	2	1	0	1	0	1	2	X	9
Northwest Territories (J. Koe)	0	1	0	0	2	0	1	0	0	X	4

Sheet B	1	2	3	4	5	6	7	8	9	10	Final
Manitoba (Dunstone) 🔨	0	2	0	2	0	0	1	0	1	0	6
Alberta (K. Koe)	1	0	1	0	0	2	0	2	0	1	7

Sheet C	1	2	3	4	5	6	7	8	9	10	Final
Manitoba (Calvert) 🔨	3	0	0	0	1	0	2	0	2	2	10
Yukon (Scoffin)	0	1	0	2	0	1	0	2	0	0	6

Sheet D	1	2	3	4	5	6	7	8	9	10	11	Final
British Columbia (Tanaka) 🔨	1	0	2	0	3	0	1	0	2	1	0	10
Saskatchewan (McEwen)	0	2	0	3	0	3	0	2	0	0	1	11

=== Draw 13 ===
Wednesday, March 4, 9:30 am

Sheet A	1	2	3	4	5	6	7	8	9	10	Final
Nova Scotia (Thompson)	0	1	0	0	2	0	1	0	X	X	4
Canada (Jacobs) 🔨	2	0	2	1	0	1	0	4	X	X	10

Sheet B	1	2	3	4	5	6	7	8	9	10	Final
Quebec (Ménard) 🔨	4	0	4	3	0	4	0	1	X	X	16
Nunavut (Samagalski)	0	2	0	0	2	0	2	0	X	X	6

Sheet C	1	2	3	4	5	6	7	8	9	10	Final
Newfoundland and Labrador (Young)	0	0	3	0	0	3	0	0	1	0	7
Saskatchewan (Knapp) 🔨	1	1	0	0	1	0	2	3	0	2	10

Sheet D	1	2	3	4	5	6	7	8	9	10	Final
Newfoundland and Labrador (Gushue) 🔨	0	2	1	5	2	0	2	0	X	X	12
Prince Edward Island (Smith)	0	0	0	0	0	1	0	2	X	X	3

=== Draw 14 ===
Wednesday, March 4, 2:30 pm

Sheet A	1	2	3	4	5	6	7	8	9	10	Final
Manitoba (Dunstone) 🔨	0	2	0	3	0	0	0	0	0	1	6
Yukon (Scoffin)	0	0	2	0	0	0	2	0	1	0	5

Sheet B	1	2	3	4	5	6	7	8	9	10	Final
Manitoba (Calvert) 🔨	0	2	0	2	0	2	0	3	X	X	9
Saskatchewan (McEwen)	0	0	1	0	1	0	2	0	X	X	4

Sheet C	1	2	3	4	5	6	7	8	9	10	Final
Northwest Territories (J. Koe)	0	0	1	0	0	0	2	0	0	X	3
British Columbia (Tanaka) 🔨	0	2	0	1	0	2	0	2	1	X	8

Sheet D	1	2	3	4	5	6	7	8	9	10	Final
Alberta (K. Koe) 🔨	1	1	1	0	1	0	4	0	X	X	8
Northern Ontario (MacEwan)	0	0	0	0	0	1	0	1	X	X	2

=== Draw 15 ===
Wednesday, March 4, 7:30 pm

Sheet A	1	2	3	4	5	6	7	8	9	10	Final
Saskatchewan (Knapp)	0	2	0	1	0	0	1	0	1	0	5
Newfoundland and Labrador (Gushue) 🔨	1	0	1	0	2	0	0	1	0	1	6

Sheet B	1	2	3	4	5	6	7	8	9	10	Final
Canada (Jacobs) 🔨	2	0	0	3	0	0	2	1	0	2	10
Newfoundland and Labrador (Young)	0	1	1	0	2	2	0	0	1	0	7

Sheet C	1	2	3	4	5	6	7	8	9	10	Final
Nova Scotia (Thompson)	0	0	1	0	1	0	0	1	0	X	3
Prince Edward Island (Smith) 🔨	2	1	0	3	0	0	0	0	3	X	9

Sheet D	1	2	3	4	5	6	7	8	9	10	Final
Ontario (King)	0	2	1	0	1	0	3	1	0	0	8
Quebec (Ménard) 🔨	2	0	0	1	0	2	0	0	1	1	7

=== Draw 16 ===
Thursday, March 5, 9:30 am

Sheet A	1	2	3	4	5	6	7	8	9	10	Final
British Columbia (Tanaka) 🔨	0	1	1	0	2	0	0	0	X	X	4
Alberta (K. Koe)	3	0	0	4	0	0	2	2	X	X	11

Sheet B	1	2	3	4	5	6	7	8	9	10	Final
Yukon (Scoffin)	0	2	1	0	0	0	0	1	X	X	4
Northwest Territories (J. Koe) 🔨	3	0	0	1	4	2	0	0	X	X	10

Sheet C	1	2	3	4	5	6	7	8	9	10	Final
Manitoba (Dunstone) 🔨	5	0	1	0	3	0	0	0	X	X	9
Northern Ontario (MacEwan)	0	1	0	1	0	1	0	0	X	X	3

Sheet D	1	2	3	4	5	6	7	8	9	10	11	Final
New Brunswick (Grattan)	0	0	2	0	1	0	2	0	2	0	1	8
Manitoba (Calvert) 🔨	0	1	0	2	0	1	0	2	0	1	0	7

=== Draw 17 ===
Thursday, March 5, 2:30 pm

Sheet A	1	2	3	4	5	6	7	8	9	10	Final
Prince Edward Island (Smith) 🔨	0	1	1	0	0	1	0	0	0	X	3
Quebec (Ménard)	0	0	0	2	1	0	0	1	4	X	8

Sheet B	1	2	3	4	5	6	7	8	9	10	Final
Saskatchewan (Knapp) 🔨	2	0	1	1	0	0	0	0	X	X	4
Ontario (King)	0	4	0	0	0	2	2	1	X	X	9

Sheet C	1	2	3	4	5	6	7	8	9	10	Final
Canada (Jacobs)	0	0	0	1	0	1	0	0	0	X	2
Newfoundland and Labrador (Gushue) 🔨	0	1	0	0	1	0	0	0	2	X	4

Sheet D	1	2	3	4	5	6	7	8	9	10	Final
Nunavut (Samagalski)	0	0	1	0	0	0	0	1	X	X	2
Nova Scotia (Thompson) 🔨	6	1	0	1	1	1	2	0	X	X	12

=== Draw 18 ===
Thursday, March 5, 7:30 pm

Sheet A	1	2	3	4	5	6	7	8	9	10	Final
Northern Ontario (MacEwan) 🔨	2	0	0	0	0	1	0	1	0	X	4
Manitoba (Calvert)	0	1	0	1	1	0	2	0	3	X	8

Sheet B	1	2	3	4	5	6	7	8	9	10	Final
British Columbia (Tanaka)	0	1	0	0	0	1	0	0	X	X	2
New Brunswick (Grattan) 🔨	2	0	2	1	1	0	2	0	X	X	8

Sheet C	1	2	3	4	5	6	7	8	9	10	Final
Yukon (Scoffin)	0	0	0	0	1	0	1	0	1	X	3
Alberta (K. Koe) 🔨	0	3	0	0	0	1	0	2	0	X	6

Sheet D	1	2	3	4	5	6	7	8	9	10	Final
Saskatchewan (McEwen)	0	2	0	0	0	1	0	0	0	0	3
Manitoba (Dunstone) 🔨	1	0	0	1	0	0	0	2	0	2	6

== Championship round ==
Page 1/2 Qualifier
A1 vs. B2
A1	Newfoundland and Labrador (Gushue)	5
B2	Manitoba (Dunstone)	7

Page 3/4 Qualifier
A1 vs. A3
A1	Newfoundland and Labrador (Gushue)	12
A3	Ontario	6

Qualified for Playoffs
Manitoba (Dunstone)	To 1 vs. 2 Page
Newfoundland and Labrador (Gushue)	To 3 vs. 4 Page

Page 1/2 Qualifier
B1 vs. A2
B1	Alberta	7
A2	Canada	4

Page 3/4 Qualifier
A2 vs. B3
A2	Canada	7
B3	Manitoba (Calvert)	3

Qualified for Playoffs
Alberta	To 1 vs. 2 Page
Canada	To 3 vs. 4 Page

=== Page 1/2 Qualifier ===
Friday, March 6, 1:30 pm

Sheet B	1	2	3	4	5	6	7	8	9	10	Final
Alberta (K. Koe) 🔨	1	0	1	0	0	0	3	0	1	1	7
Canada (Jacobs)	0	1	0	0	0	2	0	1	0	0	4

Player percentages
Alberta		Canada	
Karrick Martin	96%	Ben Hebert	90%
Aaron Sluchinski	83%	Brett Gallant	93%
Tyler Tardi	76%	Marc Kennedy	85%
Kevin Koe	89%	Brad Jacobs	81%
Total	86%	Total	87%

Sheet C	1	2	3	4	5	6	7	8	9	10	Final
Newfoundland and Labrador (Gushue) 🔨	0	2	0	1	0	1	0	1	0	0	5
Manitoba (Dunstone)	0	0	1	0	2	0	1	0	0	3	7

Player percentages
Newfoundland and Labrador (Gushue)		Manitoba (Dunstone)	
Geoff Walker	93%	Ryan Harnden	90%
Brendan Bottcher	90%	E.J. Harnden	75%
Mark Nichols	83%	Colton Lott	80%
Brad Gushue	78%	Matt Dunstone	90%
Total	86%	Total	84%

=== Page 3/4 Qualifier ===
Friday, March 6, 7:30 pm

Sheet B	1	2	3	4	5	6	7	8	9	10	Final
Newfoundland and Labrador (Gushue) 🔨	1	0	2	2	0	0	3	0	4	X	12
Ontario (King)	0	1	0	0	2	1	0	2	0	X	6

Player percentages
Newfoundland and Labrador (Gushue)		Ontario	
Geoff Walker	94%	Victor Pietrangelo	94%
Brendan Bottcher	83%	Owen Henry	72%
Mark Nichols	85%	Dylan Niepage	68%
Brad Gushue	76%	Jayden King	69%
Total	85%	Total	76%

Sheet C	1	2	3	4	5	6	7	8	9	10	Final
Canada (Jacobs) 🔨	1	0	0	2	0	1	1	0	1	1	7
Manitoba (Calvert)	0	1	1	0	0	0	0	1	0	0	3

Player percentages
Canada		Manitoba (Calvert)	
Ben Hebert	98%	Brendan Bilawka	98%
Brett Gallant	86%	Kyle Kurz	84%
Marc Kennedy	75%	Corey Chambers	73%
Brad Jacobs	85%	Braden Calvert	83%
Total	86%	Total	84%

== Playoffs ==
Page playoff system
1	Alberta	9
2	Manitoba (Dunstone)	7
3	Newfoundland and Labrador (Gushue)	5
4	Canada	7

Semifinal
2	Manitoba (Dunstone)	7
4	Canada	3

Final
1	Alberta	3
2	Manitoba (Dunstone)	6

=== 1 vs. 2 ===
Saturday, March 7, 7:30 pm

Sheet B	1	2	3	4	5	6	7	8	9	10	11	Final
Alberta (K. Koe) 🔨	0	3	0	2	0	0	1	0	1	0	2	9
Manitoba (Dunstone)	1	0	2	0	1	0	0	2	0	1	0	7

Player percentages
Alberta		Manitoba (Dunstone)	
Karrick Martin	78%	Ryan Harnden	98%
Aaron Sluchinski	83%	E.J. Harnden	99%
Tyler Tardi	85%	Colton Lott	80%
Kevin Koe	83%	Matt Dunstone	86%
Total	82%	Total	91%

=== 3 vs. 4 ===
Saturday, March 7, 1:30 pm

Sheet B	1	2	3	4	5	6	7	8	9	10	Final
Newfoundland and Labrador (Gushue) 🔨	1	0	0	0	1	0	2	0	1	0	5
Canada (Jacobs)	0	0	2	0	0	3	0	1	0	1	7

Player percentages
Newfoundland and Labrador (Gushue)		Canada	
Geoff Walker	94%	Ben Hebert	84%
Brendan Bottcher	81%	Brett Gallant	89%
Mark Nichols	78%	Marc Kennedy	79%
Brad Gushue	86%	Brad Jacobs	93%
Total	85%	Total	86%

=== Semifinal ===
Sunday, March 8, 1:30 pm

Sheet B	1	2	3	4	5	6	7	8	9	10	Final
Manitoba (Dunstone) 🔨	0	1	0	1	0	0	0	2	0	3	7
Canada (Jacobs)	0	0	1	0	1	1	0	0	0	0	3

Player percentages
Manitoba (Dunstone)		Canada	
Ryan Harnden	89%	Ben Hebert	98%
E.J. Harnden	84%	Brett Gallant	91%
Colton Lott	89%	Marc Kennedy	79%
Matt Dunstone	93%	Brad Jacobs	91%
Total	88%	Total	90%

=== Final ===
Sunday, March 8, 7:30 pm

Sheet B	1	2	3	4	5	6	7	8	9	10	Final
Alberta (K. Koe) 🔨	1	0	0	1	0	0	0	1	0	X	3
Manitoba (Dunstone)	0	1	0	0	0	0	3	0	2	X	6

Player percentages
Alberta		Manitoba (Dunstone)	
Karrick Martin	90%	Ryan Harnden	90%
Aaron Sluchinski	84%	E.J. Harnden	88%
Tyler Tardi	80%	Colton Lott	88%
Kevin Koe	86%	Matt Dunstone	94%
Total	85%	Total	90%

== Statistics ==
=== Top 5 player percentages ===
Round robin only; minimum 6 games played

Key
First All-Star Team
Second All-Star Team

Leads	%
(Manitoba) (D) Ryan Harnden	93
(Newfoundland and Labrador) (G) Geoff Walker	92
(Canada) Ben Hebert	92
(Saskatchewan) (M) Dan Marsh	91
(Quebec) Jean-François Trépanier	91

Seconds	%
(Canada) Brett Gallant	90
(Manitoba) (D) E.J. Harnden	88
(Alberta) Aaron Sluchinski	84
(Newfoundland and Labrador) (G) Brendan Bottcher	83
(Manitoba) (C) Kyle Kurz	83

Thirds	%
(Manitoba) (D) Colton Lott	91
(Canada) Marc Kennedy	88
(Newfoundland and Labrador) (G) Mark Nichols	88
(Quebec) Jean-Michel Ménard	85
(Alberta) Tyler Tardi	84

Skips	%
(Alberta) Kevin Koe	89
(Manitoba) (D) Matt Dunstone	87
(Newfoundland and Labrador) (G) Brad Gushue	86
(Canada) Brad Jacobs	85
(Saskatchewan) (M) Mike McEwen	81

=== Perfect games ===
Round robin only; minimum 10 shots thrown

Player	Team	Position	Shots	Opponent
Matt Dunstone (1)	Manitoba (Dunstone)	Skip	20	Manitoba (Calvert)
Colton Lott	Manitoba (Dunstone)	Third	16	Northern Ontario
Matt Dunstone (2)	Manitoba (Dunstone)	Skip	15	Northern Ontario

== Provincial and territorial playdowns ==
- 2026 Alberta Men's Curling Championship: January 5–11
- (British Columbia) 2026 BC Men's Curling Championship: December 30 – January 4
- 2026 Bunge Championship (Manitoba): February 4–8
- 2026 New Brunswick Tankard: January 28 – February 1
- 2026 Newfoundland and Labrador Tankard: January 20–25
- 2026 Northern Ontario Men's Provincial Curling Championship: January 6–11
- 2026 Northwest Territories Men's Curling Championship: January 22–25
- 2026 Ocean Contractors Men's Curling Championship (Nova Scotia): January 6–11
- 2026 Nunavut Men's Curling Championship: January 9–10
- 2026 Ontario Tankard: January 5–11
- (Prince Edward Island) 2026 PEI Men's Curling Championship: January 2–5
- 2026 Quebec Tankard: January 5–11
- 2026 SaskTel Tankard (Saskatchewan): January 5–11
- 2026 Yukon Men's Curling Championship: January 8–10
