= 2021 World Junior Qualification Event =

- Host city: Saskatoon, Saskatchewan
- Arena: Saskatoon Granite Curling Club
- Dates: November 22–27
- Men's winner: Nova Scotia
- Curling club: Halifax CC, Halifax
- Skip: Owen Purcell
- Third: Joel Krats
- Second: Adam McEachren
- Lead: Scott Weagle
- Coach: Anthony Purcell
- Finalist: Newfoundland and Labrador (Young)
- Women's winner: Northern Ontario
- Curling club: Curl Sudbury, Sudbury
- Skip: Isabelle Ladouceur
- Third: Jamie Smith
- Second: Lauren Rajala
- Lead: Katie Shaw
- Alternate: Katy Lukowich
- Coach: Steve Acorn
- Finalist: Alberta (Crough)

The 2021 New Holland World Junior Qualification Event was held from November 22 to 27 at the Saskatoon Granite Curling Club in Saskatoon, Saskatchewan. This one time event was used to select Canada's representatives for the 2022 World Junior Curling Championships, as the 2021 Canadian Junior Curling Championships were cancelled due to the COVID-19 pandemic.

== Men ==
=== Teams ===
The teams are listed as follows:

Team	Skip	Third	Second	Lead	Club(s)
Alberta	Johnson Tao	Jaedon Neuert	Benjamin Morin	Andrew Nowell	Saville Community SC, Edmonton
British Columbia	Connor Deane	Joshua Miki	Mack Ellis	Brenin Moore	Royal City CC, New Westminster
Manitoba	Jordon McDonald	Reece Hamm	Elias Huminicki	Alexandre Fontaine	Deer Lodge CC, Winnipeg
New Brunswick	Josh Nowlan	Alex Peasley	Wil Robertson	Jacob Nowlan	Curl Moncton, Moncton
Newfoundland and Labrador	Nathan Young	Sam Follett	Nathan Locke	Ben Stringer	RE/MAX Centre, St. John's
Northern Ontario	Dallas Burgess	Jackson Dubinsky	Matt Duizer	Brayden Sinclair	Kakabeka Falls CC, Kakabeka Falls
Northwest Territories	Jullian Bowling	Shawn Dragon	Tasir Bhuiyan	Ian Gau	Yellowknife CC, Yellowknife
Nova Scotia	Owen Purcell	Joel Krats	Adam McEachren	Scott Weagle	Halifax CC, Halifax
Ontario	Scott Mitchell	Landan Rooney	Nathan Steele	Colin Schnurr	Whitby CC, Whitby
Prince Edward Island	Chase MacMillan (Fourth)	Mitchell Schut (Skip)	Cruz Pineau	Liam Kelly	Cornwall CC, Cornwall
Quebec	Raphaël Patry	Anthony Pedneault	Zachary Pedneault	Jacob Labrecque	CC Kenogami, Jonquière
Saskatchewan	Daymond Bernath	Bryden Tessier	David Baum	Jack Reid	Sutherland CC, Saskatoon

=== Round robin standings ===
Final Round Robin Standings

Key
Teams to Playoffs

Pool A	Skip	W	L
Ontario	Scott Mitchell	4	1
Alberta	Johnson Tao	4	1
Manitoba	Jordon McDonald	3	2
Prince Edward Island	Mitchell Schut	2	3
Northern Ontario	Dallas Burgess	1	4
New Brunswick	Josh Nowlan	1	4

Pool B	Skip	W	L
Nova Scotia	Owen Purcell	5	0
Newfoundland and Labrador	Nathan Young	4	1
Saskatchewan	Daymond Bernath	3	2
British Columbia	Connor Deane	2	3
Quebec	Raphaël Patry	1	4
Northwest Territories	Jullian Bowling	0	5

=== Round robin results ===
All draws are listed in Central Time (UTC−06:00).

==== Draw 2 ====
Tuesday, November 23, 8:30 am

Sheet 4	1	2	3	4	5	6	7	8	9	10	Final
Northwest Territories (Bowling)	0	1	0	0	0	1	0	0	X	X	2
Saskatchewan (Bernath) 🔨	1	0	3	1	2	0	1	3	X	X	11

Sheet 5	1	2	3	4	5	6	7	8	9	10	Final
Nova Scotia (Purcell) 🔨	0	3	0	6	0	4	0	1	X	X	14
Quebec (Patry)	1	0	1	0	1	0	1	0	X	X	4

Sheet 6	1	2	3	4	5	6	7	8	9	10	Final
New Brunswick (Nowlan) 🔨	1	0	0	0	1	0	3	0	2	X	7
Prince Edward Island (Schut)	0	0	0	0	0	1	0	2	0	X	3

Sheet 7	1	2	3	4	5	6	7	8	9	10	Final
British Columbia (Deane) 🔨	1	0	0	0	0	1	0	2	2	0	6
Newfoundland and Labrador (Young)	0	0	0	1	1	0	2	0	0	3	7

Sheet 8	1	2	3	4	5	6	7	8	9	10	Final
Ontario (Mitchell)	0	0	0	1	1	1	0	1	1	1	6
Manitoba (McDonald) 🔨	0	1	1	0	0	0	1	0	0	0	3

Sheet 9	1	2	3	4	5	6	7	8	9	10	Final
Northern Ontario (Burgess) 🔨	0	0	1	1	0	0	2	0	0	X	4
Alberta (Tao)	1	1	0	0	1	0	0	2	1	X	6

==== Draw 4 ====
Tuesday, November 23, 7:30 pm

Sheet 4	1	2	3	4	5	6	7	8	9	10	Final
Quebec (Patry) 🔨	0	1	0	0	0	0	1	0	X	X	2
British Columbia (Deane)	1	0	1	3	2	3	0	1	X	X	11

Sheet 5	1	2	3	4	5	6	7	8	9	10	Final
Alberta (Tao) 🔨	0	1	1	1	0	0	0	2	3	X	8
Prince Edward Island (Schut)	0	0	0	0	2	0	0	0	0	X	2

Sheet 6	1	2	3	4	5	6	7	8	9	10	Final
Saskatchewan (Bernath) 🔨	0	3	0	2	0	0	1	0	0	2	8
Nova Scotia (Purcell)	2	0	3	0	1	0	0	0	3	0	9

Sheet 7	1	2	3	4	5	6	7	8	9	10	Final
Manitoba (McDonald)	0	5	0	3	1	0	0	1	X	X	10
Northern Ontario (Burgess) 🔨	1	0	1	0	0	1	0	0	X	X	3

Sheet 8	1	2	3	4	5	6	7	8	9	10	Final
Newfoundland and Labrador (Young) 🔨	3	0	1	1	0	4	0	5	X	X	14
Northwest Territories (Bowling)	0	1	0	0	1	0	1	0	X	X	3

Sheet 9	1	2	3	4	5	6	7	8	9	10	Final
New Brunswick (Nowlan)	0	0	2	1	0	1	0	1	X	X	5
Ontario (Mitchell) 🔨	4	3	0	0	1	0	6	0	X	X	14

==== Draw 6 ====
Wednesday, November 24, 2:00 pm

Sheet 4	1	2	3	4	5	6	7	8	9	10	Final
Nova Scotia (Purcell) 🔨	3	0	0	1	0	0	2	0	3	X	9
Newfoundland and Labrador (Young)	0	1	0	0	1	0	0	1	0	X	3

Sheet 5	1	2	3	4	5	6	7	8	9	10	Final
Ontario (Mitchell) 🔨	1	1	0	3	1	1	0	0	0	X	7
Northern Ontario (Burgess)	0	0	2	0	0	0	0	1	1	X	4

Sheet 6	1	2	3	4	5	6	7	8	9	10	Final
Northwest Territories (Bowling)	0	0	0	0	0	1	X	X	X	X	1
British Columbia (Deane) 🔨	2	2	4	1	1	0	X	X	X	X	10

Sheet 7	1	2	3	4	5	6	7	8	9	10	Final
Saskatchewan (Bernath)	1	0	1	0	1	0	1	0	4	2	10
Quebec (Patry) 🔨	0	1	0	3	0	3	0	1	0	0	8

Sheet 8	1	2	3	4	5	6	7	8	9	10	Final
Alberta (Tao) 🔨	2	2	2	2	0	1	X	X	X	X	9
New Brunswick (Nowlan)	0	0	0	0	1	0	X	X	X	X	1

Sheet 9	1	2	3	4	5	6	7	8	9	10	Final
Prince Edward Island (Schut) 🔨	0	0	0	0	1	0	1	0	X	X	2
Manitoba (McDonald)	0	0	2	4	0	1	0	5	X	X	12

==== Draw 8 ====
Thursday, November 25, 8:30 am

Sheet 4	1	2	3	4	5	6	7	8	9	10	Final
Ontario (Mitchell)	0	2	0	2	0	2	2	0	0	3	11
Alberta (Tao) 🔨	2	0	1	0	1	0	0	1	1	0	6

Sheet 5	1	2	3	4	5	6	7	8	9	10	Final
Manitoba (McDonald) 🔨	2	0	2	0	2	4	1	X	X	X	11
New Brunswick (Nowlan)	0	1	0	2	0	0	0	X	X	X	3

Sheet 6	1	2	3	4	5	6	7	8	9	10	Final
Newfoundland and Labrador (Young) 🔨	0	0	1	0	3	0	0	4	X	X	8
Quebec (Patry)	0	0	0	0	0	0	1	0	X	X	1

Sheet 7	1	2	3	4	5	6	7	8	9	10	Final
Northwest Territories (Bowling)	0	0	0	1	1	0	1	0	X	X	3
Nova Scotia (Purcell) 🔨	4	1	1	0	0	2	0	2	X	X	10

Sheet 8	1	2	3	4	5	6	7	8	9	10	Final
Northern Ontario (Burgess) 🔨	0	4	0	1	0	2	0	0	1	0	8
Prince Edward Island (Schut)	1	0	2	0	2	0	2	1	0	1	9

Sheet 9	1	2	3	4	5	6	7	8	9	10	Final
British Columbia (Deane) 🔨	0	0	0	0	3	0	0	2	1	0	6
Saskatchewan (Bernath)	1	1	1	1	0	2	1	0	0	0	7

==== Draw 10 ====
Thursday, November 25, 7:30 pm

Sheet 4	1	2	3	4	5	6	7	8	9	10	Final
New Brunswick (Nowlan)	0	1	0	2	0	0	0	1	0	X	4
Northern Ontario (Burgess) 🔨	1	0	3	0	0	0	2	0	1	X	7

Sheet 5	1	2	3	4	5	6	7	8	9	10	Final
Newfoundland and Labrador (Young) 🔨	2	0	2	0	2	0	1	0	0	1	8
Saskatchewan (Bernath)	0	1	0	2	0	1	0	3	0	0	7

Sheet 6	1	2	3	4	5	6	7	8	9	10	Final
Alberta (Tao) 🔨	1	1	0	1	2	0	2	1	X	X	8
Manitoba (McDonald)	0	0	1	0	0	2	0	0	X	X	3

Sheet 7	1	2	3	4	5	6	7	8	9	10	11	Final
Prince Edward Island (Schut) 🔨	0	2	0	1	0	0	2	0	1	0	1	7
Ontario (Mitchell)	0	0	1	0	1	1	0	1	0	2	0	6

Sheet 8	1	2	3	4	5	6	7	8	9	10	Final
Nova Scotia (Purcell) 🔨	0	0	1	0	0	2	0	1	0	1	5
British Columbia (Deane)	0	0	0	1	0	0	1	0	2	0	4

Sheet 9	1	2	3	4	5	6	7	8	9	10	Final
Quebec (Patry)	2	0	1	0	1	0	1	0	3	X	8
Northwest Territories (Bowling) 🔨	0	0	0	1	0	2	0	2	0	X	5

=== Playoffs ===
Quarterfinals
B2	Newfoundland and Labrador	7
A3	Manitoba	2
A2	Alberta	5
B3	Saskatchewan	8

Semifinals
A1	Ontario	4
B2	Newfoundland and Labrador	5
B1	Nova Scotia	7
B3	Saskatchewan	2

Final
B2	Newfoundland and Labrador	9
B1	Nova Scotia	10

==== Quarterfinals ====
Friday, November 26, 10:00 am

Sheet 7	1	2	3	4	5	6	7	8	9	10	Final
Newfoundland and Labrador (Young) 🔨	3	0	0	0	4	0	X	X	X	X	7
Manitoba (McDonald)	0	1	0	0	0	1	X	X	X	X	2

Sheet 8	1	2	3	4	5	6	7	8	9	10	Final
Alberta (Tao) 🔨	0	0	2	1	1	0	0	0	1	X	5
Saskatchewan (Bernath)	0	3	0	0	0	2	2	1	0	X	8

==== Semifinals ====
Friday, November 26, 5:00 pm

Sheet 4	1	2	3	4	5	6	7	8	9	10	Final
Ontario (Mitchell)	1	0	0	0	1	1	0	0	1	0	4
Newfoundland and Labrador (Young) 🔨	0	0	0	3	0	0	0	1	0	1	5

Sheet 6	1	2	3	4	5	6	7	8	9	10	Final
Nova Scotia (Purcell) 🔨	0	0	0	0	2	0	2	0	3	X	7
Saskatchewan (Bernath)	0	0	0	0	0	1	0	1	0	X	2

==== Final ====
Saturday, November 27, 1:00 pm

Sheet 5	1	2	3	4	5	6	7	8	9	10	Final
Newfoundland and Labrador (Young)	0	1	0	2	0	2	0	2	1	1	9
Nova Scotia (Purcell) 🔨	3	0	4	0	1	0	2	0	0	0	10

== Women ==
=== Teams ===
The teams are listed as follows:

Team	Skip	Third	Second	Lead	Alternate	Club(s)
Alberta	Elysa Crough	Quinn Prodaniuk	Kim Bonneau	Julianna MacKenzie		Crestwood CC, Edmonton
British Columbia	Emily Bowles	Meredith Cole	Keira McCoy	Chelsea Taylor		Royal City CC, New Westminster
Manitoba	Meghan Walter	Lane Prokopowich	Katie McKenzie	Mackenzie Elias		East St. Paul CC, East St. Paul
New Brunswick	Erica Cluff	Ashley Cormier	Rachel Brewer	Meghan Beland		Capital WC, Fredericton
Newfoundland and Labrador	Mackenzie Mitchell	Katie Follett	Sarah Chaytor	Kate Paterson		RE/MAX Centre, St. John's
Northern Ontario	Isabelle Ladouceur	Jamie Smith	Lauren Rajala	Katie Shaw	Katy Lukowich	Curl Sudbury, Sudbury
Northwest Territories	Cassie Rogers	Chasity O'Keefe	Kali Skauge	Grace Twa		Yellowknife CC, Yellowknife
Nova Scotia	Taylour Stevens	Lauren Ferguson	Alison Umlah	Cate Fitzgerald		Halifax CC, Halifax
Ontario	Adrienne Belliveau	Alyssa Blad	Madison Fisher	Shannon Warriner	Rachel Steele	Dundas G&CC, Dundas
Prince Edward Island	Rachel MacLean	Sydney Howatt	Lexie Murray	Abby Barker		Cornwall CC, Cornwall
Quebec	Cynthia St-Georges	Hannah Gargul	Amber Gargul	Florence Boivin		CC Laval-sur-le-Lac, Laval; Pointe-Claire CC, Pointe-Claire
Saskatchewan	Madison Kleiter	Kya Kennedy	Kelcee Kennedy	Mary Engel		Sutherland CC, Saskatoon

=== Round robin standings ===
Final Round Robin Standings

Key
Teams to Playoffs

Pool A	Skip	W	L
Northern Ontario	Isabelle Ladouceur	4	1
New Brunswick	Erica Cluff	3	2
Manitoba	Meghan Walter	3	2
Newfoundland and Labrador	Mackenzie Mitchell	3	2
Northwest Territories	Cassie Rogers	1	4
Quebec	Cynthia St-Georges	1	4

Pool B	Skip	W	L
Alberta	Elysa Crough	5	0
Nova Scotia	Taylour Stevens	4	1
Ontario	Adrienne Belliveau	2	3
Saskatchewan	Madison Kleiter	2	3
British Columbia	Emily Bowles	1	4
Prince Edward Island	Rachel MacLean	1	4

=== Round robin results ===
All draws are listed in Central Time (UTC−06:00).

==== Draw 1 ====
Monday, November 22, 7:00 pm

Sheet 4	1	2	3	4	5	6	7	8	9	10	Final
British Columbia (Bowles)	0	1	0	1	0	0	1	0	0	X	3
Nova Scotia (Stevens) 🔨	1	0	2	0	0	3	0	1	1	X	8

Sheet 5	1	2	3	4	5	6	7	8	9	10	11	Final
Ontario (Belliveau)	0	1	0	0	5	0	0	1	0	0	0	7
Prince Edward Island (MacLean) 🔨	0	0	2	2	0	0	0	0	2	1	1	8

Sheet 6	1	2	3	4	5	6	7	8	9	10	Final
Northwest Territories (Rogers) 🔨	0	2	0	2	0	0	1	1	0	2	8
Quebec (St-Georges)	1	0	1	0	1	2	0	0	1	0	6

Sheet 7	1	2	3	4	5	6	7	8	9	10	Final
Saskatchewan (Kleiter)	0	0	1	0	0	0	0	0	0	X	1
Alberta (Crough) 🔨	0	0	0	0	0	1	1	1	2	X	5

Sheet 8	1	2	3	4	5	6	7	8	9	10	Final
Newfoundland and Labrador (Mitchell) 🔨	0	1	0	0	0	0	1	0	X	X	2
Manitoba (Walter)	1	0	0	1	4	1	0	1	X	X	8

Sheet 9	1	2	3	4	5	6	7	8	9	10	Final
Northern Ontario (Ladouceur) 🔨	0	0	0	2	0	4	1	2	0	X	9
New Brunswick (Cluff)	1	0	2	0	2	0	0	0	1	X	6

==== Draw 3 ====
Tuesday, November 23, 2:00 pm

Sheet 4	1	2	3	4	5	6	7	8	9	10	Final
Prince Edward Island (MacLean)	0	0	1	0	0	0	2	0	1	X	4
Saskatchewan (Kleiter) 🔨	2	0	0	1	1	2	0	2	0	X	8

Sheet 5	1	2	3	4	5	6	7	8	9	10	Final
New Brunswick (Cluff)	0	0	2	0	0	1	1	0	1	0	5
Quebec (St-Georges) 🔨	0	1	0	0	2	0	0	3	0	2	8

Sheet 6	1	2	3	4	5	6	7	8	9	10	Final
Nova Scotia (Stevens) 🔨	0	0	3	0	0	1	1	0	1	0	6
Ontario (Belliveau)	0	0	0	2	0	0	0	1	0	2	5

Sheet 7	1	2	3	4	5	6	7	8	9	10	Final
Manitoba (Walter)	0	0	3	0	0	2	2	0	0	X	7
Northern Ontario (Ladouceur) 🔨	2	2	0	1	3	0	0	1	4	X	13

Sheet 8	1	2	3	4	5	6	7	8	9	10	Final
Alberta (Crough)	2	0	2	0	0	1	0	1	0	2	8
British Columbia (Bowles) 🔨	0	1	0	1	1	0	0	0	1	0	4

Sheet 9	1	2	3	4	5	6	7	8	9	10	Final
Northwest Territories (Rogers)	0	2	0	1	0	0	1	1	0	X	5
Newfoundland and Labrador (Mitchell) 🔨	1	0	4	0	1	3	0	0	1	X	10

==== Draw 5 ====
Wednesday, November 24, 8:30 am

Sheet 4	1	2	3	4	5	6	7	8	9	10	Final
Ontario (Belliveau) 🔨	0	2	0	1	1	0	0	2	0	X	6
Alberta (Crough)	2	0	1	0	0	2	2	0	2	X	9

Sheet 5	1	2	3	4	5	6	7	8	9	10	Final
Newfoundland and Labrador (Mitchell)	0	1	0	1	1	0	2	0	2	1	8
Northern Ontario (Ladouceur) 🔨	1	0	1	0	0	1	0	2	0	0	5

Sheet 6	1	2	3	4	5	6	7	8	9	10	Final
Saskatchewan (Kleiter) 🔨	1	0	2	1	0	0	2	0	1	1	8
British Columbia (Bowles)	0	0	0	0	1	1	0	3	0	0	5

Sheet 7	1	2	3	4	5	6	7	8	9	10	Final
Nova Scotia (Stevens)	0	2	0	5	0	0	1	2	X	X	10
Prince Edward Island (MacLean) 🔨	1	0	1	0	2	0	0	0	X	X	4

Sheet 8	1	2	3	4	5	6	7	8	9	10	Final
New Brunswick (Cluff) 🔨	0	0	2	2	0	2	0	2	1	X	9
Northwest Territories (Rogers)	1	1	0	0	1	0	2	0	0	X	5

Sheet 9	1	2	3	4	5	6	7	8	9	10	Final
Quebec (St-Georges)	0	0	0	0	0	0	0	2	X	X	2
Manitoba (Walter) 🔨	2	0	0	1	2	4	3	0	X	X	12

==== Draw 7 ====
Wednesday, November 24, 7:30 pm

Sheet 4	1	2	3	4	5	6	7	8	9	10	Final
Newfoundland and Labrador (Mitchell)	0	3	0	0	0	0	0	1	0	X	4
New Brunswick (Cluff) 🔨	1	0	1	1	2	1	1	0	2	X	9

Sheet 5	1	2	3	4	5	6	7	8	9	10	Final
Manitoba (Walter) 🔨	3	0	0	1	2	0	4	0	X	X	10
Northwest Territories (Rogers)	0	0	1	0	0	1	0	2	X	X	4

Sheet 6	1	2	3	4	5	6	7	8	9	10	Final
Alberta (Crough)	0	3	0	0	0	0	4	2	0	X	9
Prince Edward Island (MacLean) 🔨	1	0	0	0	2	1	0	0	1	X	5

Sheet 7	1	2	3	4	5	6	7	8	9	10	Final
British Columbia (Bowles)	0	0	1	0	1	0	2	0	0	1	5
Ontario (Belliveau) 🔨	0	1	0	2	0	2	0	1	1	0	7

Sheet 8	1	2	3	4	5	6	7	8	9	10	Final
Northern Ontario (Ladouceur) 🔨	0	4	3	0	0	4	1	0	X	X	12
Quebec (St-Georges)	0	0	0	2	0	0	0	2	X	X	4

Sheet 9	1	2	3	4	5	6	7	8	9	10	Final
Saskatchewan (Kleiter) 🔨	0	0	1	0	0	0	1	0	X	X	2
Nova Scotia (Stevens)	0	0	0	2	1	3	0	2	X	X	8

==== Draw 9 ====
Thursday, November 25, 2:00 pm

Sheet 4	1	2	3	4	5	6	7	8	9	10	Final
Northwest Territories (Rogers) 🔨	0	0	0	0	3	0	0	0	0	X	3
Northern Ontario (Ladouceur)	0	0	1	0	0	1	1	3	1	X	7

Sheet 5	1	2	3	4	5	6	7	8	9	10	Final
Alberta (Crough)	2	2	0	0	3	0	0	0	1	0	8
Nova Scotia (Stevens) 🔨	0	0	1	1	0	3	0	1	0	1	7

Sheet 6	1	2	3	4	5	6	7	8	9	10	Final
New Brunswick (Cluff)	0	1	1	0	0	0	2	2	1	X	7
Manitoba (Walter) 🔨	1	0	0	1	1	0	0	0	0	X	3

Sheet 7	1	2	3	4	5	6	7	8	9	10	Final
Quebec (St-Georges) 🔨	1	0	1	0	1	0	0	2	0	X	5
Newfoundland and Labrador (Mitchell)	0	2	0	1	0	1	2	0	1	X	7

Sheet 8	1	2	3	4	5	6	7	8	9	10	Final
Ontario (Belliveau)	0	1	0	0	2	2	1	2	X	X	8
Saskatchewan (Kleiter) 🔨	0	0	1	1	0	0	0	0	X	X	2

Sheet 9	1	2	3	4	5	6	7	8	9	10	Final
Prince Edward Island (MacLean)	0	1	0	1	0	0	0	0	X	X	2
British Columbia (Bowles) 🔨	3	0	1	0	1	1	1	1	X	X	8

=== Playoffs ===
Quarterfinals
B2	Nova Scotia	7
A3	Manitoba	4
A2	New Brunswick	9
B3	Ontario	3

Semifinals
A1	Northern Ontario	6
B2	Nova Scotia	3
B1	Alberta	10
A2	New Brunswick	4

Final
A1	Northern Ontario	7
B1	Alberta	6

==== Quarterfinals ====
Friday, November 26, 10:00 am

Sheet 4	1	2	3	4	5	6	7	8	9	10	Final
New Brunswick (Cluff)	2	0	0	3	0	0	2	0	2	X	9
Ontario (Belliveau) 🔨	0	0	2	0	0	0	0	1	0	X	3

Sheet 5	1	2	3	4	5	6	7	8	9	10	Final
Nova Scotia (Stevens)	0	1	0	0	0	3	1	1	0	1	7
Manitoba (Walter) 🔨	1	0	0	1	0	0	0	0	2	0	4

==== Semifinals ====
Friday, November 26, 5:00 pm

Sheet 7	1	2	3	4	5	6	7	8	9	10	Final
Northern Ontario (Ladouceur) 🔨	1	0	0	2	1	1	1	0	0	X	6
Nova Scotia (Stevens)	0	0	1	0	0	0	0	1	1	X	3

Sheet 8	1	2	3	4	5	6	7	8	9	10	Final
Alberta (Crough)	2	0	0	3	1	0	2	1	1	X	10
New Brunswick (Cluff) 🔨	0	3	0	0	0	1	0	0	0	X	4

==== Final ====
Saturday, November 27, 1:00 pm

Sheet 6	1	2	3	4	5	6	7	8	9	10	Final
Northern Ontario (Ladouceur)	0	0	2	0	3	1	1	0	0	0	7
Alberta (Crough) 🔨	1	0	0	2	0	0	0	1	0	2	6
