= Sam Follett =

Canadian curler

- Curler
- Born: August 30, 2002 (age 24); Paradise, Newfoundland and Labrador

Team
- Curling club: RE/MAX Centre, St. John's, NL

Curling career
- Member Association: Newfoundland and Labrador
- Brier: 2 (2022, 2023)
- Top CTRS ranking: 34th (2021–22)

Samuel Follett (born August 30, 2002) is a Canadian curler from Paradise, Newfoundland and Labrador.

== Career ==
Follett and his team have been competing together from a very young age. It was in 2015 when the rink won their first provincial championship in the U16 NLCA Provincials. After their championship, they would move straight to the U18 curling division.

In 2020, Follett won his first provincial championship in the U18 category. He competed for the first time with Joel Krats who was picked up for the tournament due to Ben Stringer being aged out. The Nathan Young rink beat Team Liam Quinlan 8-1 in the finals to qualify for the Canadian U18 Curling Championships. This tournament ended up being cancelled due to the outbreak of COVID-19. Follett also got the privilege of competing in the 2020 Winter Youth Olympics as an alternate player. The squad led by Nathan Young went 5-0 in the round robin before getting eliminating in the quarter-finals of the play-offs.

In 2021, Follett started off the year by competing in the 2021 Newfoundland and Labrador Tankard to try and compete in the 2021 Tim Hortons Brier. He would end up falling short of the playoffs and finish in the standings with a 3-4 record. Towards the end of the year though, he got to travel to the 2021 World Junior Qualification Event, representing Newfoundland and Labrador for a chance to be Team Canada in the 2022 World Junior Curling Championships. They fell one point short losing to Nova Scotia's Owen Purcell in the finals.

In 2022, he once again started off the year by competing in the 2022 Newfoundland and Labrador Tankard. This year though, his team won all of their round robin games to send them straight to the finals. They ended up defeating defending tankard champion Greg Smith in the finals to qualify themselves for their first ever brier. In the 2022 Tim Hortons Brier they were easily the youngest team at the competition. While they did finish the tournament with a 1-7 record, his team broke the record for the youngest curler in brier history when alternate player Nicholas Codner stepped in on their game against Kevin Koe to play at only 15-years-old. To add to this year, he also won every game in the 2022 U21 Newfoundland and Labrador Provincials to qualify themselves for the 2022 Canadian Junior Curling Championships when they beat Team Sean O'Leary in the finals. There, his team went 7–1 in the round robin before losing in the quarterfinals to eventual champions Ontario's Landan Rooney.

In 2023, the year started off with his team picking up Adam Currie to play in the lead position as their second does not attend Memorial University. They beat the Sean O'Leary rink in a series to three to become the Memorial University Seahawks curling team. The second tournament of the year which had them compete with Aaron Feltham did not go as well. They would go 3-1 in the round robin of the 2023 NLCA U21 Provincials. After beating the O'Leary rink in the semi-finals, Follett's team would go on to lose 9-1 in the finals to Simon Perry. Due to past performances though, Newfoundland and Labrador were granted a second team in the 2023 Canadian Junior Curling Championships and the Nathan Young squad get to represent that team. The team would rebound a few days later by going 6-1 in the round robin of the 2023 Newfoundland and Labrador Tankard and then beating the Greg Smith rink in the finals to secure their second consecutive title and locking in their spot in the 2023 Tim Hortons Brier.

In 2024, Follett announced through the Team Young social media pages that he would be taking a step back from competitive curling as he would be moving outside of Canada to further his education.

== Personal life ==
Follett graduated Memorial University of Newfoundland with a degree in psychology. He is currently attending Logan University to pursue a Doctor in Chiropractic degree.

== Teams ==
Season	Skip	Third	Second	Lead
2016–17	Nathan Young	Sam Follett	Ben Stringer	Nathan Locke
2017–18	Nathan Young	Sam Follett	Nathan Locke	Ben Stringer
2018–19	Nathan Young	Sam Follett	Nathan Locke	Ben Stringer
2019–20	Nathan Young	Sam Follett	Nathan Locke	Ben Stringer; Joel Krats
2020–21	Nathan Young	Sam Follett	Nathan Locke	Ben Stringer
2021–22	Nathan Young	Sam Follett	Nathan Locke	Ben Stringer
2022–23	Nathan Young	Sam Follett	Nathan Locke	Ben Stringer; Aaron Feltham; Adam Currie
2023–24	Nathan Young	Sam Follett	Nathan Locke	Ben Stringer
