= Colin Thomas (curler) =

Canadian curler

- Curler
- Born: March 16, 1991 (age 35); St. John's, Newfoundland and Labrador

Team
- Curling club: RE/MAX Centre, St. John's, NL

Curling career
- Member Association: Newfoundland and Labrador
- Brier: 2 (2024, 2026)

Colin Thomas (born March 16, 1991) is a Canadian curler from Conception Bay South, Newfoundland and Labrador.

== Career ==
In 2011, Colin Thomas competed in the 2011 CIS/CCA Curling Championships as the skip for the Memorial University of Newfoundland team. Thomas would go on to defeat Brendan Bottcher in the semi-finals, and then James Coleman in the finals on his way to winning the first championship for the Memorial University Seahawks.

In 2021, Thomas would skip his own rink in the 2021 Newfoundland and Labrador Tankard. They would finish the round robin tied with Andrew Symonds, and win the tiebreaker. The Thomas rink would find themselves in the finals against Greg Smith where they would lose 9–8 in a double extra end.

In 2024, Thomas would find himself as the third for the Andrew Symonds rink. In the 2024 Newfoundland and Labrador Tankard, they would make it to the finals against Greg Smith. They would find themselves defeating Smith and claiming the championship, as well as qualifying themselves for the 2024 Montana's Brier. This would be the first brier that Thomas would qualify for.

Thomas would win his 2nd provincial championship at the 2026 Newfoundland and Labrador Tankard, now playing third for the Nathan Young rink, beating Simon Perry 5–4 in the final, qualifying the Young rink to represent Newfoundland and Labrador as the home team at the 2026 Montana's Brier.

== Personal life ==
Thomas is an assistant controller for Moncton Flight College / PAL Airlines. He is married and has three children. His father is past Newfoundland and Labrador coach, Jeff Thomas.
