= Jeff Thomas (curler) =

Canadian curler

- Curler
- Born: July 2, 1958 (age 68); St. John's, Newfoundland

Team
- Curling club: RE/MAX Centre, St. John's, NL

Curling career
- Member Association: Newfoundland and Labrador
- Brier: 8 (1979, 1984, 1985, 1997, 2007, 2020, 2023, 2026)
Medal record
Men's curling
Representing Newfoundland and Labrador
Canadian Olympic Curling Trials
Gold medal – first place	2021 Saskatoon
Tim Hortons Brier
Gold medal – first place	2020 Kingston
Silver medal – second place	2007 Hamilton

Jeff Thomas (born July 2, 1958) is a Canadian curler and coach from St. John's, Newfoundland and Labrador. He currently coaches Team Nathan Young, Team Parker Tipple and Team Cailey Locke.

== Career ==
Thomas is well-known for coaching in Newfoundland and Labrador. He has been coaching since the mid-1980s, and he has coached for some of the biggest stars in Newfoundland and Labrador, including Brad Gushue and Nathan Young.

In 2020, Thomas got the opportunity to be the alternate for the Gushue rink in the 2020 Tim Hortons Brier. Here they successfully claimed the gold medal and qualified for the 2020 World Men's Curling Championship. That tournament was ultimately cancelled though, due to the COVID-19 pandemic.

In 2021, Thomas was the alternate for the Gushue rink when they competed in the 2021 Canadian Olympic Curling Trials, where they won and qualified for the 2022 Winter Olympics. This was the first time that Thomas had the opportunity to be a part of the Olympics. At the Olympics, Thomas was replaced by Marc Kennedy as the team's alternate, but took on a coaching role.

In 2026, Thomas was the alternate for the Young rink at the 2026 Montana's Brier. In Draw 7 vs Team Nova Scotia, Thomas made an appearance in relief of lead Ben Stringer. This marked the first time that Thomas played on home ice in the Brier, as well as the first time that he played with his son Colin

== Personal life ==
Thomas is retired. He is married and has two sons, one of whom, Colin, is also a competitive curler.
