= Nathan Young (curler) =

Canadian curler (born 2002)

- Curler
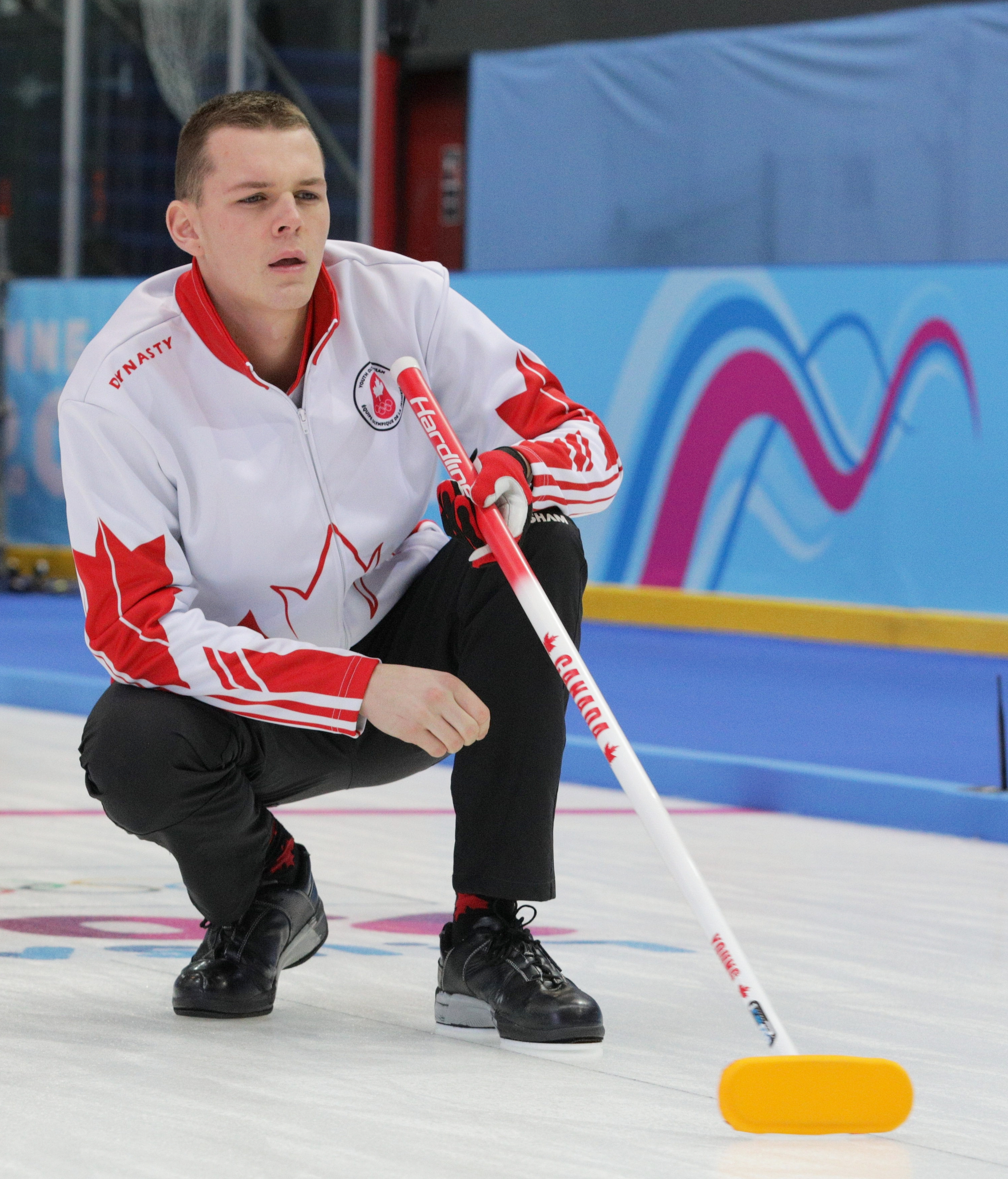
- Born: November 18, 2002 (age 23); St. John's, Newfoundland and Labrador

Team
- Curling club: RE/MAX Centre, St. John's, NL
- Skip: Nathan Young
- Third: Brady Lumley
- Second: Matthew Garner
- Lead: Spencer Dunlop

Curling career
- Member Association: Newfoundland and Labrador (2015–2026); Ontario (2026–present)
- Brier: 3 (2022, 2023, 2026)
- Pan Continental Championship: 1 (2022)
- Top CTRS ranking: 34th (2021–22)
Medal record
Mixed Doubles Curling
Representing Canada
Winter Youth Olympics
| Gold medal – first place | 2020 Lausanne |
Pan Continental Curling Championships
| Gold medal – first place | 2022 Calgary |

Nathan Young (born November 18, 2002) is a Canadian curler, originally from St. John's, Newfoundland and Labrador, currently residing in Toronto. He currently skips his own team out of Ontario.

== Career ==
=== Juniors ===
Young claimed his first provincial championship in the U16 NLCA Provincials in 2015. In 2020, Young qualified for his first national championship by winning the U18 NL provincial championships. They beat Team Liam Quinlan 8–1 in the provincial finals to qualify for the Canadian U18 Curling Championships, which was subsequently cancelled due to the outbreak of COVID-19. However, Young would be chosen to represent Canada and compete in the 2020 Winter Youth Olympics, where they would lose to Japan 5–4 in the quarterfinals and Canada would finish 7th in the team event. Young would also compete at the Youth Olympics with Laura Nagy, who was representing Hungary, in a mixed-NOC mixed doubles event. The duo ended up claiming the gold medal in a 9–5 victory in the finals.

In 2021, he started off the year by competing in the 2021 Newfoundland and Labrador Tankard to try and compete in the 2021 Tim Hortons Brier. He would end up falling short of the playoffs and finish in the standings with a 3–4 record. Towards the end of the year though, he got to take his team to the 2021 World Junior Qualification Event, representing Newfoundland and Labrador for a chance to be Team Canada in the 2022 World Junior Curling Championships. There, they lost to Nova Scotia's Owen Purcell in the finals.

In 2022, Young started the season being named as the alternate for Canada at the 2022 Pan Continental Curling Championships, on a team skipped by Brad Gushue. There, the Gushue rink would win the championships, beating South Korea's Jeong Byeong-jin 11–3 in the final. Young, skipping his own junior team, would once again compete in the 2022 Newfoundland and Labrador Tankard. This year though, they won all of their round robin games to send them straight to the finals. They ended up defeating defending tankard champion Greg Smith in the finals to qualify themselves for their first ever brier. In the 2022 Tim Hortons Brier they were easily the youngest team at the competition. While they did finish the tournament with a 1–7 record, his team broke the record for the youngest curler in brier history when alternate player Nicholas Codner stepped in on their game against Kevin Koe to play at only 15-years-old. To add to this year, he also won every game in the 2022 U21 Newfoundland and Labrador Provincials to qualify themselves for the 2022 Canadian Junior Curling Championships when they beat Team Sean O'Leary in the finals. There, his team went 7–1 in the round robin before losing in the quarterfinals to eventual champions Ontario's Landan Rooney.

=== Men's ===
After aging out of Juniors, Young looked to defend his provincial men's title at the 2023 Newfoundland and Labrador Tankard. They would win their second title, once again beating Greg Smith 8–6 in the final, qualifying to represent Newfoundland and Labrador again for the 2023 Tim Hortons Brier. At the Brier, Young would slightly improve on their previous years' performance, finishing with a 2–6 record. At the 2024 Newfoundland and Labrador Tankard, Young would fail to win his 3rd consecutive provincial championship, losing to eventual champions Andrew Symonds 7–6 in the Tiebreaker game.

Young would win his 3rd provincial championship at the 2026 Newfoundland and Labrador Tankard, beating Simon Perry 5–4 in the final, qualifying Young to represent Newfoundland and Labrador as the home team at the 2026 Montana's Brier.

== Personal life ==
Young took commerce and arts at Memorial University of Newfoundland. He currently lives in Toronto and works as an analyst for SagePoint Capital Partners.

== Teams ==
| Season | Skip | Third | Second | Lead |
|---|---|---|---|---|
| 2016–17 | Nathan Young | Sam Follett | Ben Stringer | Nathan Locke |
| 2017–18 | Nathan Young | Sam Follett | Nathan Locke | Ben Stringer |
| 2018–19 | Nathan Young | Sam Follett | Nathan Locke | Ben Stringer |
| 2019–20 | Nathan Young | Sam Follett | Nathan Locke | Ben Stringer; Joel Krats |
| 2020–21 | Nathan Young | Sam Follett | Nathan Locke | Ben Stringer |
| 2021–22 | Nathan Young | Sam Follett | Nathan Locke | Ben Stringer |
| 2022–23 | Nathan Young | Sam Follett | Nathan Locke | Ben Stringer; Aaron Feltham; Adam Currie |
| 2023–24 | Nathan Young | Sam Follett | Nathan Locke | Ben Stringer |
| 2024–25 | Nathan Young | Colin Thomas | Nathan Locke | Ben Stringer |
| 2025–26 | Nathan Young | Colin Thomas | Nathan Locke | Ben Stringer |
| 2026–27 | Nathan Young | Brady Lumley | Matthew Garner | Spencer Dunlop |
