= 2025 Newfoundland and Labrador Tankard =

Canadian provincial men's curling championship

- Host city: St. John's, Newfoundland and Labrador
- Arena: RE/MAX Centre
- Dates: January 21–25
- Winner: Team Dilello
- Curling club: RE/MAX Centre, St. John's
- Skip: Ty Dilello
- Third: Ryan McNeil Lamswood
- Second: Daniel Bruce
- Lead: Aaron Feltham
- Finalist: Andrew Symonds

The 2025 Newfoundland and Labrador Tankard, the men's provincial curling championship for Newfoundland and Labrador, was held from January 21 to 25 at the RE/MAX Centre in St. John's, Newfoundland and Labrador. The winning Ty Dilello rink represented Newfoundland and Labrador at the 2025 Montana's Brier in Kelowna, British Columbia. The event was held in conjunction with the 2025 Newfoundland and Labrador Women's Curling Championship, the provincial women's championship.

With 12 teams entering the event, the format was changed from a round robin to a seeded triple knockout, which was last used in 2019.

== Teams ==
The teams are listed as follows:

Skip	Third	Second	Lead	Alternate	Coach	Club
Ty Dilello	Ryan McNeil Lamswood	Daniel Bruce	Aaron Feltham			RE/MAX Centre, St. John's
Brandon Gillespie	Owen Cousins	Scott Mackie	Stephen Goulding			Goose Bay CC, Happy Valley-Goose Bay
Ken Peddigrew	David Noftall	Mark Healy	Alex Smith			RE/MAX Centre, St. John's
Simon Perry	Nicholas Codner	Brayden Snow	Carter Holden	Greg Blyde	Glenn Goss	RE/MAX Centre, St. John's
Dylan Hancock (Fourth)	Evan Kearley	Kenny Saunders (Skip)	Andrew Taylor	Devon Ryan	Shawn Kearley	RE/MAX Centre, St. John's
Cory Schuh	Kelly Schuh	Spencer Wicks	Mike Mosher	Sean O'Leary		RE/MAX Centre, St. John's
Greg Smith	Chris Ford	Zach Young	Carter Small		Leslie Anne Walsh	RE/MAX Centre, St. John's
Andrew Symonds	Trent Skanes	Stephen Trickett	Keith Jewer			RE/MAX Centre, St. John's
Dave Thomas	Mike Mullins	Cody Parsons	Floyd Francis			Gateway CC, Channel-Port aux Basques
Parker Tipple	Spencer Tipple	Jack Kinsella	Nathan Murphy		Jeff Thomas	RE/MAX Centre, St. John's
Randy Turpin	Scott Eaton	Shawn Hawco	Steve Routledge			RE/MAX Centre, St. John's
Nathan Young	Colin Thomas	Nathan Locke	Ben Stringer		Jeff Thomas	RE/MAX Centre, St. John's

== Knockout Brackets ==
=== A Event ===
First Knockout	A Qualifier
Greg Smith	10
Parker Tipple	2	Kenny Saunders	3
Kenny Saunders	9	Greg Smith	5
Nathan Young	2
Nathan Young	8
Brandon Gillespie	2	Ty Dilello	4
Ty Dilello	10	Greg Smith	0
Andrew Symonds	8
Andrew Symonds	9
Simon Perry	8	Simon Perry	4
Randy Turpin	0	Andrew Symonds	8
Cory Schuh	5
Cory Schuh	8
Dave Thomas	11	Dave Thomas	3
Ken Peddigrew	6

=== B Event ===
Second Knockout	B Qualifier
Andrew Symonds	7
Parker Tipple	2
Nathan Young	7	Nathan Young	4
Simon Perry	6
Simon Perry	7	Simon Perry	6
Dave Thomas	0	Andrew Symonds	6
Brandon Gillespie	3
Ty Dilello	7
Dave Thomas	8
Greg Smith	7
Randy Turpin	8
Cory Schuh	3	Ty Dilello	8
Kenny Saunders	5
Randy Turpin	4	Ty Dilello	9
Ty Dilello	10
Ken Peddigrew	4
Ty Dilello	9

=== C Event ===
Third Knockout	C Qualifier
Andrew Symonds	9
Greg Smith	6	Parker Tipple	4
Simon Perry	5	Parker Tipple	9	Andrew Symonds	3
Randy Turpin	2	Parker Tipple	13	Ty Dilello	4
Parker Tipple	10	Parker Tipple	8	Ty Dilello	7
Brandon Gillespie	2	Nathan Young	3	Cory Schuh	1
Cory Schuh	7	Cory Schuh	8
Dave Thomas	8	Kenny Saunders	1
Kenny Saunders	7	Kenny Saunders	9
Ken Peddigrew	4

== Knockout Results ==
All draws are listed in Newfoundland Time (UTC−03:30).

=== Draw 1 ===
Tuesday, January 21, 1:30 pm

Sheet 1	1	2	3	4	5	6	7	8	9	10	Final
Parker Tipple	0	0	0	0	2	0	X	X	X	X	2
Kenny Saunders	2	2	1	2	0	2	X	X	X	X	9

Sheet 2	1	2	3	4	5	6	7	8	9	10	Final
Brandon Gillespie	0	0	2	0	0	0	X	X	X	X	2
Ty Dilello	2	3	0	2	1	2	X	X	X	X	10

Sheet 3	1	2	3	4	5	6	7	8	9	10	Final
Simon Perry	3	1	1	3	X	X	X	X	X	X	8
Randy Turpin	0	0	0	0	X	X	X	X	X	X	0

Sheet 6	1	2	3	4	5	6	7	8	9	10	Final
Dave Thomas	1	1	0	1	2	0	1	0	5	X	11
Ken Peddigrew	0	0	1	0	0	3	0	2	0	X	6

=== Draw 2 ===
Tuesday, January 21, 7:00 pm

Sheet 1	1	2	3	4	5	6	7	8	9	10	Final
Andrew Symonds	0	0	3	1	0	1	2	0	2	X	9
Simon Perry	2	0	0	0	0	0	0	2	0	X	4

Sheet 2	1	2	3	4	5	6	7	8	9	10	Final
Greg Smith	0	2	0	0	1	2	0	5	X	X	10
Kenny Saunders	1	0	0	1	0	0	1	0	X	X	3

Sheet 3	1	2	3	4	5	6	7	8	9	10	Final
Cory Schuh	1	0	1	0	0	0	4	2	X	X	8
Dave Thomas	0	1	0	0	1	1	0	0	X	X	3

Sheet 6	1	2	3	4	5	6	7	8	9	10	Final
Nathan Young	1	0	0	2	1	0	0	0	4	X	8
Ty Dilello	0	0	1	0	0	0	2	1	0	X	4

=== Draw 3 ===
Wednesday, January 22, 9:30 am

Sheet 1	1	2	3	4	5	6	7	8	9	10	Final
Randy Turpin	1	0	0	2	0	1	0	2	0	2	8
Kenny Saunders	0	1	2	0	0	0	1	0	1	0	5

Sheet 2	1	2	3	4	5	6	7	8	9	10	Final
Ken Peddigrew	0	1	1	0	0	2	0	X	X	X	4
Ty Dilello	2	0	0	3	1	0	3	X	X	X	9

Sheet 3	1	2	3	4	5	6	7	8	9	10	Final
Parker Tipple	0	0	1	0	0	0	1	X	X	X	2
Simon Perry	1	2	0	1	0	2	0	X	X	X	6

Sheet 6	1	2	3	4	5	6	7	8	9	10	Final
Brandon Gillespie	0	0	0	1	0	1	0	1	0	X	3
Dave Thomas	0	1	1	0	1	0	3	0	2	X	8

=== Draw 4 ===
Wednesday, January 22, 2:30 pm

Sheet 1	1	2	3	4	5	6	7	8	9	10	Final
Greg Smith	1	0	1	0	0	0	1	1	0	1	5
Nathan Young	0	1	0	1	0	0	0	0	0	0	2

Sheet 2	1	2	3	4	5	6	7	8	9	10	Final
Simon Perry	5	1	1	X	X	X	X	X	X	X	7
Dave Thomas	0	0	0	X	X	X	X	X	X	X	0

Sheet 3	1	2	3	4	5	6	7	8	9	10	Final
Randy Turpin	1	0	0	1	0	1	0	1	0	X	4
Ty Dilello	0	2	1	0	1	0	3	0	3	X	10

Sheet 6	1	2	3	4	5	6	7	8	9	10	Final
Andrew Symonds	1	0	4	0	0	0	1	2	0	X	8
Cory Schuh	0	1	0	1	1	1	0	0	1	X	5

=== Draw 5 ===
Wednesday, January 22, 7:30 pm

Sheet 1	1	2	3	4	5	6	7	8	9	10	Final
Parker Tipple	0	2	0	1	4	0	3	X	X	X	10
Brandon Gillespie	0	0	1	0	0	1	0	X	X	X	2

Sheet 3	1	2	3	4	5	6	7	8	9	10	Final
Greg Smith	0	0	0	0	X	X	X	X	X	X	0
Andrew Symonds	2	1	3	2	X	X	X	X	X	X	8

Sheet 6	1	2	3	4	5	6	7	8	9	10	Final
Kenny Saunders	1	0	0	0	4	0	1	0	1	X	7
Ken Peddigrew	0	1	0	1	0	1	0	1	0	X	4

=== Draw 6 ===
Thursday, January 23, 9:30 am

Sheet 1	1	2	3	4	5	6	7	8	9	10	Final
Dave Thomas	3	0	1	0	0	0	1	1	0	2	8
Kenny Saunders	0	1	0	2	1	2	0	0	3	0	9

Sheet 2	1	2	3	4	5	6	7	8	9	10	Final
Cory Schuh	0	0	0	1	0	1	1	0	X	X	3
Ty Dilello	0	2	1	0	3	0	0	3	X	X	9

Sheet 3	1	2	3	4	5	6	7	8	9	10	Final
Nathan Young	1	0	0	0	1	0	1	2	0	2	7
Simon Perry	0	1	1	1	0	2	0	0	1	0	6

Sheet 6	1	2	3	4	5	6	7	8	9	10	Final
Randy Turpin	0	1	0	1	0	X	X	X	X	X	2
Parker Tipple	3	0	3	0	2	X	X	X	X	X	8

=== Draw 7 ===
Thursday, January 23, 2:30 pm

Sheet 1	1	2	3	4	5	6	7	8	9	10	Final
Andrew Symonds	1	0	1	0	2	0	2	1	X	X	7
Nathan Young	0	1	0	2	0	1	0	0	X	X	4

Sheet 2	1	2	3	4	5	6	7	8	9	10	Final
Simon Perry	0	2	0	1	0	0	2	0	X	X	5
Parker Tipple	1	0	2	0	2	3	0	5	X	X	13

Sheet 3	1	2	3	4	5	6	7	8	9	10	Final
Cory Schuh	1	1	0	1	2	2	X	X	X	X	7
Kenny Saunders	0	0	1	0	0	0	X	X	X	X	1

Sheet 6	1	2	3	4	5	6	7	8	9	10	Final
Greg Smith	0	0	1	0	1	2	1	1	0	1	7
Ty Dilello	2	1	0	2	0	0	0	0	3	0	8

=== Draw 8 ===
Friday, January 24, 11:00 am

Sheet 1	1	2	3	4	5	6	7	8	9	10	Final
Greg Smith	0	3	0	0	0	0	3	0	0	X	6
Parker Tipple	0	0	1	1	1	2	0	2	2	X	9

Sheet 2	1	2	3	4	5	6	7	8	9	10	Final
Nathan Young	0	0	1	0	1	0	0	1	0	X	3
Cory Schuh	1	1	0	2	0	0	1	0	3	X	8

Sheet 3	1	2	3	4	5	6	7	8	9	10	Final
Andrew Symonds	0	0	2	0	3	0	0	0	1	0	6
Ty Dilello	1	0	0	4	0	0	0	1	0	1	7

=== Draw 9 ===
Friday, January 24, 4:00 pm

Sheet 2	1	2	3	4	5	6	7	8	9	10	Final
Andrew Symonds	0	0	1	0	0	1	3	0	4	X	9
Parker Tipple	0	0	0	1	1	0	0	2	0	X	4

Sheet 6	1	2	3	4	5	6	7	8	9	10	Final
Ty Dilello	0	1	0	1	1	0	2	2	X	X	7
Cory Schuh	0	0	0	0	0	1	0	0	X	X	1

=== Draw 10 ===
Saturday, January 25, 9:00 am

Sheet 3	1	2	3	4	5	6	7	8	9	10	Final
Andrew Symonds	0	1	0	1	0	0	0	1	0	0	3
Ty Dilello	0	0	0	0	1	1	1	0	0	1	4

== Playoffs ==
As Team Dilello won both the B and C events, they had to be beaten twice in the playoffs.

Semifinal			Final
			B	Ty Dilello
A	Andrew Symonds	5	C	Ty Dilello
C	Ty Dilello	6

=== Semifinal ===
Saturday, January 25, 1:30 pm

Sheet 3	1	2	3	4	5	6	7	8	9	10	Final
Andrew Symonds	2	0	1	1	0	0	1	0	0	0	5
Ty Dilello	0	1	0	0	0	1	0	1	2	1	6

2025 Newfoundland & Labrador Tankard
(Newfoundland and Labrador)
Ty Dilello
1st Newfoundland & Labrador Provincial Championship title
