= Nunavut Men's Curling Championship =

Territorial curling championship in Canada

- Established: 2016
- 2026 host city: Iqaluit, Nunavut
- 2026 arena: Iqaluit Curling Club
- 2026 champion: Derek Samagalski

Current edition
- 2026 Nunavut Men's Curling Championship

The Nunavut Men's Curling Championship is the annual men's territorial tournament held to determine Nunavut's representative at the Montana's Brier, Canada's national men's curling championship.

== Summary ==
Nunavut, Canada's newest territory, was granted its own team at the Brier in 2015, but declined the invitation in that year's Brier. The territory held its first Brier playdown in 2016, when Iqaluit's Wade Kingdon rink beat Rankin Inlet's Arthur Siksik rink 3 games to 1 in a best of 5 series. At the 2016 Tim Hortons Brier, the team played in a pre-qualifying tournament, losing all three games.

In 2017, Jim Nix of New Glasgow, Nova Scotia was asked by a friend to join a club team in Iqaluit and proceeded to win a two-game series to represent Nunavut at the 2017 Tim Hortons Brier. At the Brier, the team lost all three games in the pre-qualifying tournament.

2018 had a similar situation, when St. Marys, Ontario resident David St. Louis was asked by friends in Iqaluit, where he used to work to join their team. The team beat the Jake Higgs rink to represent Nunavut at the 2018 Tim Hortons Brier. Curling Canada abolished the pre-qualifying tournament at the 2018 Brier, which was replaced by two pools of eight teams. At the Brier, the team lost all seven pool games, and the 15th place game. (Note: The "placement round" was only played in the 2018 Brier.)

St. Louis defeated Higgs again in the 2019 playdowns. Skipping Nunavut at the 2019 Tim Hortons Brier he led the territory to another 0–7 record.

World Curling Tour veteran Jake Higgs from Strathroy, Ontario won the Brier playdown for 2020 on his third try. He led is team to a 3–0 record in the three-team tournament which also featured St. Louis and Kingdon. Higgs had played for Ontario at the 2009 Canadian Mixed Curling Championship which was held in Iqaluit, where he was acquainted with some local curlers, who suggested he come to town to try and win the playdown. His experience did not help Team Nunavut at the 2020 Tim Hortons Brier however, as the team went 0–7 again.

In 2021, Nunavut was one of the few member associations in Canada to have a playdown due the COVID-19 pandemic, which forced other jurisdictions to cancel their respective championships. (Note: Because of strictly-enforced travel restrictions combined with the territory's general isolation, the first COVID-19 cases were not recorded in Nunavut until much later than more densely-populated jurisdictions.) The Nunavut playdown was a best-of-five series between Peter Mackey and Wade Kingdon. After going down two games to none, the Mackey rink came back to win three straight, winning the title. Because of the pandemic, the 2021 Tim Hortons Brier had two more "wild card" teams, which expanded the field to 18 teams, adding one more game to Nunavut's schedule. Adding an extra game did not help Team Nunavut, as the team once again lost all of their games, going 0–8.

In 2022, Mackey once again represented Nunavut at the Brier. At the 2022 Tim Hortons Brier, by which time the tournament was permanently expanded to eighteen teams, the team went winless in eight games.

The 2023 playdowns were held in December 2022. They were won by Jake Higgs, who defeated Peter Mackey 8–7 in the final. The event was a three-team double round robin with a final, and also involved Team Peter Van Strien. Higgs' team earned Nunavut's first Brier win at the 2023 Tim Hortons Brier when they defeated Nathan Young of Newfoundland and Labrador in their first game. They went on to lose their next seven games, to finish with a 1–7 record.

Similarly to the previous year, the 2024 edition of the Nunavut Men's Territorials were held in December 2023. Shane Latimer from Winchester, Ontario, who is also the head coach of the Western Mustangs men's curling team, won his first Nunavut Men's Territorials, beating Wade Kingdon 11–3 in the final. The team won their second ever game at the 2024 Montana's Brier when they beat Nova Scotia's Matthew Manuel rink. The team finished the Brier with another 1–7 record.

The 2025 playdowns were held in January 2025. The Shane Latimer rink won again, beating the Peter Mackey team 3-0 in a best-of-five playoff. At the 2025 Montana's Brier, the team went winless, losing all eight of their games.

The event changed its name for 2026 to the Nunavut Men's Curling Championship. There, a rink skipped by Derek Samagalski beat the reigning champions Shane Latimer 3-0 in a best-of-five playoff.

== Winners ==
Year	Team	Club	Brier Record (placement)	Shot %
2026	Derek Samagalski, Sheldon Wettig, Christian Smitheram, Justin McDonell	Iqaluit	0–8 (18th of 18)	66%
2025	Shane Latimer, Sheldon Wettig, Justin McDonell, Peter Van Strien	Iqaluit	0–8 (18th of 18)	68%
2024	Shane Latimer, Sheldon Wettig, Brady St. Louis, Christian Smitheram	Iqaluit	1–7 (18th of 18)	73%
2023	Jake Higgs, Sheldon Wettig, Brady St. Louis, Terry Lichty, Christian Smitheram	Iqaluit	1–7 (18th of 18)	71%
2022	Peter Mackey, Mark Pillsworth, Jeff Nadeau, Greg Howard	Iqaluit	0–8 (18th of 18)	63%
2021	Peter Mackey, Jeff Nadeau, Greg Howard, Jeff Chown	Iqaluit	0–8 (T17th of 18)	62%
2020	Jake Higgs, Dale Kohlenberg, Christian Smitheram, Ed MacDonald, Sheldon Wettig	Iqaluit	0–7 (T15th of 16)	66%
2019	Dave St. Louis, Peter Mackey, Jeff Nadeau, Lloyd Kendall	Iqaluit	0–7 (T15th of 16)	65%
2018	Dave St. Louis, Wade Kingdon, Peter Mackey, Jeff Nadeau	Iqaluit	0–8 (16th of 16)	67%
2017	Jim Nix, Ed MacDonald, Greg Howard, Darryl McGrath, Howard Fick	Iqaluit	0–3 (15th of 15)	56%
2016	Wade Kingdon, Dennis Masson, Aaron Fraser, Bruce Morgan, Chris West	Iqaluit	0–3 (15th of 15)	54%
