= 2026 Nunavut Men's Curling Championship =

Men's territorial curling championship for Nunavut

- Host city: Iqaluit, Nunavut
- Arena: Iqaluit Curling Club
- Dates: January 9–10
- Winner: Team Samagalski
- Curling club: Iqaluit CC, Iqaluit
- Skip: Derek Samagalski
- Third: Sheldon Wettig
- Second: Christian Smitheram
- Lead: Justin McDonell
- Finalist: Shane Latimer

The 2026 Nunavut Men's Curling Championship, the men's territorial curling championship for Nunavut, was held from January 9 to 10 at the Iqaluit Curling Club in Iqaluit. The winning Derek Samagalski rink will represent Nunavut at the 2026 Montana's Brier in St. John's, Newfoundland and Labrador.

As only two teams entered the championship, the event was held as a best-of-five tournament which Samagalski won 3 games to none.

== Teams ==
Teams are listed as follows:

| Skip | Third | Second | Lead | Alternate | Locale |
|---|---|---|---|---|---|
| Derek Samagalski | Sheldon Wettig | Christian Smitheram | Justin McDonell | | Iqaluit |
| Shane Latimer | Peter Mackey | David Aglukark | Jeff Nadeau | Greg Howard | Iqaluit |

== Scores ==
All draw times are listed in Eastern Standard Time (UTC−05:00).

=== Draw 1 ===
Friday, January 9, 6:30 pm

| Sheet B | 1 | 2 | 3 | 4 | 5 | 6 | 7 | 8 | 9 | 10 | Final |
|---|---|---|---|---|---|---|---|---|---|---|---|
| Shane Latimer | 0 | 1 | 0 | 0 | 0 | 0 | 1 | 0 | X | X | 2 |
| Derek Samagalski 🔨 | 0 | 0 | 1 | 1 | 1 | 2 | 0 | 3 | X | X | 8 |

=== Draw 2 ===
Saturday, January 10, 10:00 am

| Sheet C | 1 | 2 | 3 | 4 | 5 | 6 | 7 | 8 | 9 | 10 | Final |
|---|---|---|---|---|---|---|---|---|---|---|---|
| Shane Latimer 🔨 | 1 | 0 | 0 | 0 | 0 | 0 | 0 | 1 | X | X | 2 |
| Derek Samagalski | 0 | 0 | 2 | 1 | 2 | 1 | 1 | 0 | X | X | 7 |

=== Draw 3 ===
Saturday, January 10, 4:00 pm

| Sheet B | 1 | 2 | 3 | 4 | 5 | 6 | 7 | 8 | 9 | 10 | Final |
|---|---|---|---|---|---|---|---|---|---|---|---|
| Shane Latimer | 0 | 0 | 1 | 0 | 1 | 0 | 1 | 0 | 2 | X | 5 |
| Derek Samagalski 🔨 | 1 | 0 | 0 | 3 | 0 | 2 | 0 | 1 | 0 | X | 7 |

2026 Nunavut Men's Curling Championship

Derek Samagalski
1st Nunavut Territorial Championship title
