= 2019 Newfoundland and Labrador Tankard =

- Host city: St. John's, Newfoundland and Labrador
- Arena: Bally Haly Golf & Curling Club
- Dates: January 29 – February 3
- Winner: Team Symonds
- Curling club: Re/Max Centre
- Skip: Andrew Symonds
- Third: Chris Ford
- Second: Adam Boland
- Lead: Keith Jewer
- Finalist: Rick Rowsell

The 2019 Newfoundland and Labrador Men's Curling Championship (also known as the Tankard), the men's provincial curling championship for Newfoundland and Labrador, was held from January 29 to February 3 at the Bally Haly Golf & Curling Club in St. John's. The winning Andrew Symonds team represented Newfoundland and Labrador at the 2019 Tim Hortons Brier, Canada's national men's curling championship in Brandon, Manitoba.

== Teams ==
With 12 teams entering the event, it is the biggest Newfoundland and Labrador Tankard field in over 15 years.

Teams are as follows:

Skip	Third	Second	Lead	Alternate	Club
Bernard Bird	Ryan Wheaton	Owen Cousins	Stephen Goulding		Goose Bay Curling Club, Happy Valley-Goose Bay
Rod Feltham	Kris MacLeod	Steve Humphries	Alex Silmarie		Gander Curling Club, Gander
Nick Lane	Jeff Rose	Andrew Taylor	Michael Mosher		Re/Max Centre, St. John's
Justin Lockyer	Stephen Spratt	Jacob Gazeley	Jason Noel		Re/Max Centre, St. John's
Ken Peddigrew	Mark Healy	Evan Kearley	David Noftall		Re/Max Centre, St. John's
Rick Rowsell	Keith Ryan	Stephen Trickett	Zach Young	Alex Smith	Re/Max Centre, St. John's
Trent Skanes	Steve Bragg	Andrew Manuel	Michael Day		Re/Max Centre, St. John's
Greg Smith	Nicholas Bissonnette	John Sheppard	Ian Withycombe	Randy Turpin	Re/Max Centre, St. John's
Matthew Smith	Scott Davidge	Stephen Tibbs	Glynn Williams		Re/Max Centre, St. John's
Andrew Symonds	Chris Ford	Adam Boland	Keith Jewer		Re/Max Centre, St. John's
Colin Thomas	Cory Schuh	Spencer Wicks	Jeff Thomas		Re/Max Centre, St. John's
Dave Thomas	Cody Parsons	Patrick Von Wiegen	Floyd Francis		Gateway Curling Club, Port aux Basques

== Knockout brackets ==
=== A Event ===
First knockout
Peddigrew	7
Feltham	4
Lane	5
Bird	9
M. Smith	9
D. Thomas	2
G. Smith	12
Lockyer	3

Quarterfinals
Peddigrew	9
Rowsell	5
Bird	0
Skanes	9
M. Smith	4
Symonds	7
G. Smith	5
C. Thomas	7

Semifinals
Peddigrew	6
Skanes	9
Symonds	9
C. Thomas	0

A Qualifier
Skanes	2
Symonds	8

=== B Event ===
Second knockout
Feltham	7
M. Smith	12
Lane	2
G. Smith	10
D. Thomas	6
Rowsell	7
Lockyer	0
Bird	11

Round of 16
M. Smith	6
G. Smith	8
Rowsell	7
Bird	5

Quarterfinals
G. Smith	9
Peddigrew	8
Rowsell	8
C. Thomas	4

Semifinals
G. Smith	3
Symonds	8
Rowsell	6
Skanes	8

B Qualifier
Symonds	8
Skanes	5

=== C Event ===
Third knockout (top half)
Feltham	7
Lane	6

Round of 16
Feltham	9
Bird	8

Quarterfinals
Feltham	8
Peddigrew	9

Semifinals
Peddigrew	2
Rowsell	6

To C Final
Rowsell	7
Symonds	4

Third knockout (bot. half)
D. Thomas	7
Lockyer	6

Round of 16
D. Thomas	8
M. Smith	11

Quarterfinals
M. Smith	4
C. Thomas	11

Semifinals
C. Thomas	7
G. Smith	5

To C Final
C. Thomas	6
Skanes	7
C Final
Rowsell	9
Skanes	7

== Playoffs ==
As the winner of two events, the Andrew Symonds rink needed to be beaten twice. Symonds defeated Rowsell in the first game, so a second game was not necessary.

Semifinal			Final
			1	Andrew Symonds
1	Andrew Symonds	5	1	Andrew Symonds
2	Rick Rowsell	0

=== Semifinal ===
Sunday, February 3, 9:30am

Sheet 3	1	2	3	4	5	6	7	8	9	10	Final
Andrew Symonds	0	0	2	0	0	0	2	0	1	X	5
Rick Rowsell	0	0	0	0	0	0	0	0	0	X	0

=== Final ===
Sunday, February 3, 2:30pm

Since Symonds won the semifinal, a final was not necessary.

2019 Newfoundland & Labrador Tankard
(Newfoundland and Labrador)
Andrew Symonds
1st Newfoundland & Labrador Provincial Championship title
