= 2025 Nunavut Brier Playdowns =

Men's territorial curling championship for Nunavut

2025 Men's Territorials
- Host city: Iqaluit, Nunavut
- Arena: Iqaluit Curling Club
- Dates: January 10–11
- Winner: Team Latimer
- Curling club: Iqaluit CC, Iqaluit
- Skip: Shane Latimer
- Third: Sheldon Wettig
- Second: Justin McDonell
- Lead: Peter Van Strien
- Finalist: Peter Mackey

The 2025 Nunavut Brier Playdowns, also known as the Men's Territorials, the men's territorial curling championship for Nunavut, was held from January 10 to 11 at the Iqaluit Curling Club in Iqaluit. The winning Shane Latimer rink, will represent Nunavut at the 2025 Montana's Brier in Kelowna, British Columbia.

As only two teams entered the championship, the event was held in a best of five tournament, with Latimer winning 3–0 over the Peter Mackey rink.

== Teams ==
Teams are listed as follows:

Skip	Third	Second	Lead	Locale
Shane Latimer	Sheldon Wettig	Justin McDonell	Peter Van Strien	Iqaluit
Doug Johnston (Fourth)	Peter Mackey (Skip)	Jeff Nadeau	Greg Howard	Iqaluit

== Scores ==
All draw times are listed in Eastern Standard Time (UTC−05:00).

=== Draw 1 ===
Friday, January 10, 7:00 pm

Sheet B	1	2	3	4	5	6	7	8	9	10	Final
Shane Latimer	3	0	1	0	1	0	0	4	X	X	9
Peter Mackey	0	1	0	1	0	0	1	0	X	X	3

=== Draw 2 ===
Saturday, January 11, 11:00 am

Sheet B	1	2	3	4	5	6	7	8	9	10	Final
Peter Mackey	0	1	0	1	0	0	1	X	X	X	3
Shane Latimer	1	0	3	0	3	1	0	X	X	X	8

=== Draw 3 ===
Saturday, January 11, 4:00 pm

Sheet C	1	2	3	4	5	6	7	8	9	10	Final
Peter Mackey	0	0	0	1	0	0	1	X	X	X	2
Shane Latimer	2	1	3	0	1	1	0	X	X	X	8

2025 Men's Territorials Champion

Shane Latimer
2nd Nunavut Territorial Championship title
