= 2016 Nunavut Brier Playdowns =

The 2016 Nunavut Brier Playdowns were held January 8-10 in Iqaluit. The winning Wade Kingdon rink represented Nunavut at the 2016 Tim Hortons Brier in Ottawa.

The 2016 Nunavut Brier Playdowns were the inaugural men's championship for the territory, after the territory declined an invitation to the 2015 Brier.

The event was a best of five tournament between the Wade Kingdon rink from Iqaluit and the Arthur Siksik rink from Rankin Inlet. Kingdon won the event in four games.

== Teams ==
Skip	Third	Second	Lead	Club
Wade Kingdon	Dennis Masson	Aaron Fraser	Bruce Morgan	Iqaluit Curling Club, Iqaluit
Arthur Siksik	David Kakuktinniq	Tyson Komaksiutiksak	Javen Komaksiutiksak	Qavik Curling Club, Rankin Inlet

== Scores ==
=== Game #1 ===
January 8, 7:00 pm

Sheet A	1	2	3	4	5	6	7	8	9	10	Final
Wade Kingdon	0	0	1	2	0	0	0	0	1	0	4
Arthur Siksik	0	1	0	0	1	1	0	1	0	1	5

=== Game #2 ===
January 9, 9:30 am

Sheet A	1	2	3	4	5	6	7	8	9	10	Final
Wade Kingdon	0	2	0	3	1	1	0	0	3	X	10
Arthur Siksik	0	0	2	0	0	0	2	2	0	X	6

=== Game #3 ===
January 9, 2:30 pm

Sheet A	1	2	3	4	5	6	7	8	9	10	Final
Wade Kingdon	0	1	3	2	1	0	3	0	X	X	10
Arthur Siksik	2	0	0	0	0	0	0	2	X	X	4

=== Game #4 ===
January 9, 7:30pm

Sheet A	1	2	3	4	5	6	7	8	9	10	Final
Wade Kingdon	3	3	1	2	0	1	0	2	X	X	12
Arthur Siksik	0	0	0	0	1	0	1	0	X	X	2

2016 Nunavut Brier Playdowns

Wade Kingdon
1st Nunavut Territorial Championship title
