= 2025 Newfoundland and Labrador Women's Curling Championship =

Canadian provincial women's curling championship

- Host city: St. John's, Newfoundland and Labrador
- Arena: RE/MAX Centre
- Dates: January 22–25
- Winner: Team Godsland
- Curling club: RE/MAX Centre, St. John's
- Skip: Brooke Godsland
- Third: Erin Porter
- Second: Sarah McNeil Lamswood
- Lead: Camille Burt
- Coach: Cory Schuh
- Finalist: Carrie Vautour

The 2025 Newfoundland and Labrador Women's Curling Championship was held from January 22 to 25 at the RE/MAX Centre in St. John's, Newfoundland and Labrador. The winning Brooke Godsland rink represented Newfoundland and Labrador at the 2025 Scotties Tournament of Hearts in Thunder Bay, Ontario. The event was held in conjunction with the 2025 Newfoundland and Labrador Tankard, the provincial men's championship.

== Teams ==
The teams are listed as follows:

Skip	Third	Second	Lead	Alternate	Coach	Club
Megan Blandford	Kiersten Devereaux	Hanna Lomholt	Katarina Smith	Emily Neary		RE/MAX Centre, St. John's
Sarah Boland	Kelli Sharpe	Beth Hamilton	Adrienne Mercer	Laura Strong	Laura Phillips	RE/MAX Centre, St. John's
Stacie Curtis	Jessica Wiseman	Julie Hynes	Erica Curtis	Heather Martin	Eugene Trickett	RE/MAX Centre, St. John's
Wendy Dunne	Krista Crowther	Mackenzie Dinn	Rebecca Roberts			RE/MAX Centre, St. John's
Brooke Godsland	Erin Porter	Sarah McNeil Lamswood	Camille Burt		Cory Schuh	RE/MAX Centre, St. John's
Carrie Vautour	Jennifer Glasgow	Courtney Barnhill	Sydney Parsons	Cathy Rogers	Gary Ryan	RE/MAX Centre, St. John's

== Round robin standings ==
Final Round Robin Standings

Key
Teams to Final

Skip	W	L	W–L	PF	PA	EW	EL	BE	SE
Brooke Godsland	4	1	–	43	21	18	15	4	8
Carrie Vautour	3	2	2–0	36	37	20	20	3	5
Stacie Curtis	3	2	1–1	37	34	20	20	0	8
Sarah Boland	3	2	0–2	38	26	22	17	3	9
Wendy Dunne	1	4	1–0	25	41	17	19	1	6
Megan Blandford	1	4	0–1	23	43	16	22	3	5

== Round robin results ==
All draw times are listed in Newfoundland Time (UTC−03:30).

=== Draw 1 ===
Wednesday, January 22, 2:30 pm

Sheet 4	1	2	3	4	5	6	7	8	9	10	11	Final
Carrie Vautour	4	0	0	0	0	0	1	2	0	2	0	9
Megan Blandford	0	3	1	1	0	2	0	0	2	0	2	11

Sheet 5	1	2	3	4	5	6	7	8	9	10	Final
Brooke Godsland	0	0	3	4	0	0	2	0	1	1	11
Stacie Curtis	1	0	0	0	1	2	0	3	0	0	7

=== Draw 2 ===
Wednesday, January 22, 7:30 pm

Sheet 4	1	2	3	4	5	6	7	8	9	10	Final
Wendy Dunne	0	1	0	3	1	0	1	0	0	X	6
Sarah Boland	1	0	2	0	0	2	0	2	4	X	11

Sheet 5	1	2	3	4	5	6	7	8	9	10	Final
Brooke Godsland	0	1	3	0	7	X	X	X	X	X	11
Carrie Vautour	1	0	0	1	0	X	X	X	X	X	2

=== Draw 3 ===
Thursday, January 23, 9:30 am

Sheet 4	1	2	3	4	5	6	7	8	9	10	Final
Brooke Godsland	1	1	0	0	0	1	0	0	0	X	3
Sarah Boland	0	0	1	2	0	0	2	1	1	X	7

Sheet 5	1	2	3	4	5	6	7	8	9	10	Final
Stacie Curtis	2	0	1	0	1	0	0	0	2	0	6
Carrie Vautour	0	0	0	1	0	1	1	3	0	3	9

=== Draw 4 ===
Thursday, January 23, 2:30 pm

Sheet 4	1	2	3	4	5	6	7	8	9	10	Final
Stacie Curtis	0	0	1	0	3	0	2	0	0	2	8
Megan Blandford	0	0	0	1	0	1	0	1	2	0	5

Sheet 5	1	2	3	4	5	6	7	8	9	10	Final
Wendy Dunne	0	1	0	1	0	2	0	X	X	X	4
Brooke Godsland	0	0	0	0	5	0	4	X	X	X	9

=== Draw 5 ===
Friday, January 24, 11:00 am

Sheet 4	1	2	3	4	5	6	7	8	9	10	11	Final
Carrie Vautour	1	0	2	0	0	1	0	2	0	0	1	7
Sarah Boland	0	1	0	1	0	0	0	0	1	3	0	6

Sheet 5	1	2	3	4	5	6	7	8	9	10	Final
Wendy Dunne	1	0	3	1	0	3	0	0	1	X	9
Megan Blandford	0	2	0	0	1	0	1	1	0	X	5

=== Draw 6 ===
Friday, January 24, 4:00 pm

Sheet 3	1	2	3	4	5	6	7	8	9	10	Final
Wendy Dunne	0	0	1	1	0	0	1	0	X	X	3
Carrie Vautour	4	0	0	0	3	1	0	1	X	X	9

Sheet 4	1	2	3	4	5	6	7	8	9	10	Final
Brooke Godsland	1	0	0	3	2	1	2	X	X	X	9
Megan Blandford	0	0	1	0	0	0	0	X	X	X	1

Sheet 5	1	2	3	4	5	6	7	8	9	10	Final
Stacie Curtis	2	0	0	4	0	0	2	0	1	X	9
Sarah Boland	0	0	1	0	2	1	0	2	0	X	6

=== Draw 7 ===
Saturday, January 25, 9:00 am

Sheet 4	1	2	3	4	5	6	7	8	9	10	Final
Stacie Curtis	0	2	2	1	2	0	X	X	X	X	7
Wendy Dunne	1	0	0	0	0	2	X	X	X	X	3

Sheet 5	1	2	3	4	5	6	7	8	9	10	Final
Megan Blandford	0	0	0	1	0	0	X	X	X	X	1
Sarah Boland	0	1	2	0	4	1	X	X	X	X	8

== Final ==
Saturday, January 25, 1:30 pm

Sheet 4	1	2	3	4	5	6	7	8	9	10	Final
Brooke Godsland	0	3	0	2	2	0	0	3	X	X	10
Carrie Vautour	0	0	2	0	0	1	1	0	X	X	4

2025 Newfoundland & Labrador Women's Curling Championship
(Newfoundland and Labrador)
Brooke Godsland
1st Newfoundland & Labrador Provincial Championship title
