= 2015 Travelers Curling Club Championship =

Canadian national curling championship edition

- Host city: Ottawa
- Arena: Ottawa Hunt and Golf Club
- Dates: November 23–28
- Men's winner: Newfoundland and Labrador
- Curling club: St. John's CC, St. John's
- Skip: Andrew Symonds
- Third: Mark Healy
- Second: Cory Ewart
- Lead: Keith Jewer
- Finalist: Manitoba (Tyler Drews)
- Women's winner: Prince Edward Island
- Curling club: Cornwall CC, Cornwall
- Skip: Lisa Jackson
- Third: Carolyn Coulson
- Second: Melissa Morrow
- Lead: Jodi Murphy
- Finalist: Ontario (Tina Mazerolle)

The 2015 Travelers Curling Club Championship was held from November 23 to 28 at the Ottawa Hunt and Golf Club in Ottawa, Ontario.

== Men ==
=== Teams ===
Province	Skip	Third	Second	Lead	Locale
Alberta	Curtis Harrish	Brian Kushinski	Tyler Wasieczko	Daniel Munro	Calmar CC, Calmar
British Columbia	Kevin Britz	Kenneth Britz	James Crawford	Darren Jarvis	Chilliwack CC, Chilliwack
Manitoba	Tyler Drews	Joshua Drews	Daryl Evans	Jake Zelenewich	Fort Rouge CC, Winnipeg
New Brunswick	Shawn Ingersoll	Moe Gautreau	Michael Prince	Hubert Williston	Miramichi CC, Miramichi
Newfoundland and Labrador	Andrew Symonds	Mark Healy	Cory Ewart	Keith Jewer	St. John's CC, St. John's
Northern Ontario	Mike Assad	Mitch Shallow	Andrew Hackner	Dwayne Sutherland	Geraldton CC, Geraldton
Northwest Territories	Nick Sautrino	Mark Robertson	Kevin McLeod	Gordie Kasook	Inuvik CC, Inuvik
Nova Scotia	Mike Callaghan	Logan Ward	Ian Wilson	Brad Wilson	Mayflower CC, Halifax
Nunavut	Edmund MacDonald	Greg Howard	Darryl McGrath	Alexandre Larabie	Iqaluit CC, Iqaluit
Ontario	Mike Benjamins	Kevin Ross	Jeff Fotheringham	Don Wilkin	Palmerston CC, Palmerston
Prince Edward Island	Freddy Fraser	Daryl Macdonald	Blaine Hutt	John Ellsworth	Western Community CC, Alberton
Quebec	Stephane Lamy	Eric Gravel	Gaetan Lachapelle	Pierre Clermont	CC Laval-sur-le-Lac, Laval
Saskatchewan	Shane Vollman	Kevin Fetsch	Garry Janz	Bob Sonder	Highland CC, Regina
Yukon	Jim Sias	Greg Thom	Lee Malanchuk	Brad Wilson	Whitehorse CC, Whitehorse

=== Round-robin standings ===
==== Pool A ====
Team	W	L
Newfoundland and Labrador	5	1
Nova Scotia	4	2
Quebec	4	2
Saskatchewan	4	2
Ontario	2	4
Prince Edward Island	2	4
Nunavut	0	6

==== Pool B ====
Team	W	L
Manitoba	5	1
Yukon	4	2
Northern Ontario	4	2
British Columbia	3	3
New Brunswick	3	3
Alberta	2	4
Northwest Territories	0	6

==== Tie-Breaker ====
Friday, November 27, 9:30

Team	1	2	3	4	5	6	7	8	Final
Saskatchewan	0	2	0	0	0	2	0	X	4
Quebec	1	0	0	2	2	0	1	X	6

=== Playoffs ===
Quarterfinal
B2	Yukon	2
A3	Quebec	11
A2	Nova Scotia	7
B3	Northern Ontario	3

Semifinal
A1	Newfoundland and Labrador	6
A3	Quebec	3
B1	Manitoba	5
A2	Nova Scotia	3

Final
A1	Newfoundland and Labrador	6
B1	Manitoba	4

Bronze-medal game
A3	Quebec	6
A2	Nova Scotia	5

==== Quarterfinals ====
Friday, November 27, 14:30

Team	1	2	3	4	5	6	7	8	Final
Yukon	0	0	0	0	2	0	0	X	2
Quebec	0	3	2	3	0	1	2	X	11

Team	1	2	3	4	5	6	7	8	Final
Nova Scotia	0	0	2	0	1	1	3	X	7
Northern Ontario	0	2	0	1	0	0	0	X	3

==== Semifinals ====
Friday, November 27, 19:30

Team	1	2	3	4	5	6	7	8	Final
Newfoundland and Labrador	0	2	0	2	0	0	2	X	6
Quebec	0	0	2	0	0	1	0	X	3

Team	1	2	3	4	5	6	7	8	Final
Manitoba	1	0	1	0	2	0	1	X	5
Nova Scotia	0	1	0	1	0	1	0	X	3

==== Bronze-medal game ====
Saturday, November 28, 11:00

Team	1	2	3	4	5	6	7	8	9	Final
Quebec	0	1	0	0	1	0	3	0	1	6
Nova Scotia	0	0	0	3	0	1	0	1	0	5

==== Final ====
Saturday, November 28, 11:00

Team	1	2	3	4	5	6	7	8	Final
Newfoundland and Labrador	1	0	3	0	0	1	0	1	6
Manitoba	0	1	0	1	1	0	1	0	4

== Women ==
=== Teams ===
Province	Skip	Third	Second	Lead	Locale
Alberta	Nanette Dupont	Samantha Davies	Kendra Nakagama	Avice DeKelver	Lethbridge CC, Lethbridge
British Columbia	Leanne Andrews	Jenn Routliffe	Kim McLandress	Philippa Johnston	Cloverdale CC, Surrey
Manitoba	Marlene Lang	Pamela Kok	Jackie Hendrickson	Lori Campbell	St. Vital CC, Winnipeg
New Brunswick	Paulette Girvan	Nicole Richard	Jennifer Gallagher	Denise Grant	Rexton CC, Rexton
Newfoundland and Labrador	Pam Osborne	Candy Thomas	Carolyn Walters	Susie Ennis	St. John's CC, St. John's
Northern Ontario	Kathie Jackson	Teresa McFayden	Jackie McCormick	Leanne Eluik	Fort Frances CC, Fort Frances
Northwest Territories	Diane Baxter	Donna Maring	Eleanor Jerome	Wilhelmina Lennie	Inuvik CC, Inuvik
Nova Scotia	Monica Moriarty	Karen Langlois	Cheryl Mallet Skelton	Jodi Vacheresse	Mayflower CC, Halifax
Nunavut	Angela Dale	Annette Boucher	Megan Ingram	Rebecca Pearson	Qavik CC, Rankin Inlet
Ontario	Tina Mazerolle	Allison Singh	Erin Cook	Laura Davis-Cook	Guelph CC, Guelph
Prince Edward Island	Lisa Jackson	Carolyn Coulson	Melissa Morrow	Jodi Murphy	Cornwall CC, Cornwall
Quebec	Sonia Simard	Josée Bédard	Guylaine Sauvageau	Mona Léonard	CC Amos, Amos
Saskatchewan	Candace Newkirk	Tina Hill	Kaitlin Corbin	Rebecca Fowler	Moose Jaw Ford CC, Moose Jaw
Yukon	Jody Smallwood	Joan Hyrve	April Williams	Laura Williamson	Whitehorse CC, Whitehorse

=== Round-robin standings ===
==== Pool A ====
Team	W	L
Prince Edward Island	5	1
Ontario	5	1
Saskatchewan	4	2
Quebec	3	3
Newfoundland and Labrador	2	4
Nova Scotia	2	4
Nunavut	0	6

==== Pool B ====
Team	W	L
Alberta	5	1
Northern Ontario	5	1
British Columbia	4	2
New Brunswick	3	3
Yukon	2	4
Manitoba	1	4
Northwest Territories	0	6

=== Playoffs ===
Quarterfinal
B2	Northern Ontario	9
A3	Saskatchewan	0
A2	Ontario	6
B3	British Columbia	5

Semifinal
A1	Prince Edward Island	6
B2	Northern Ontario	2
B1	Alberta	3
A2	Ontario	7

Final
A1	Prince Edward Island	5
A2	Ontario	3

Bronze-medal game
B2	Northern Ontario	8
B1	Alberta	9

==== Quarterfinals ====
Friday, November 27, 14:30

Team	1	2	3	4	5	6	7	8	Final
Northern Ontario	0	3	2	1	1	2	X	X	9
Saskatchewan	0	0	0	0	0	0	X	X	0

Team	1	2	3	4	5	6	7	8	Final
Ontario	1	0	2	2	1	0	0	0	6
British Columbia	0	2	0	0	0	1	1	1	5

==== Semifinals ====
Friday, November 23, 19:30

Team	1	2	3	4	5	6	7	8	Final
Prince Edward Island	0	0	1	2	1	1	1	X	6
Northern Ontario	2	0	0	0	0	0	0	X	2

Team	1	2	3	4	5	6	7	8	Final
Alberta	1	1	0	0	1	0	0	X	3
Ontario	0	0	2	2	0	1	2	X	7

==== Bronze-medal game ====
Saturday, November 28, 11:00

Team	1	2	3	4	5	6	7	8	9	Final
Northern Ontario	3	0	0	1	0	2	0	2	0	8
Alberta	0	1	3	0	3	0	1	0	1	9

==== Final ====
Saturday, November 28, 11:00

Team	1	2	3	4	5	6	7	8	Final
Prince Edward Island	0	2	0	0	2	1	0	X	5
Ontario	0	0	1	1	0	0	1	X	3
