= 2024 Nunavut Brier Playdowns =

Men's territorial curling championship for Nunavut

2024 Men's Territorials
- Host city: Iqaluit, Nunavut
- Arena: Iqaluit Curling Club
- Dates: December 14–17
- Winner: Team Latimer
- Curling club: Iqaluit CC, Iqaluit
- Skip: Shane Latimer
- Third: Sheldon Wettig
- Second: Brady St. Louis
- Lead: Christian Smitheram
- Finalist: Wade Kingdon

The 2024 Nunavut Brier Playdowns, also known as the Men's Territorials, is the men's territorial curling championship for Nunavut, were held from December 14–17 at the Iqaluit Curling Club in Iqaluit. The winning team, skipped by Shane Latimer, will represent Nunavut at the 2024 Montana's Brier in Regina, Saskatchewan.

== Teams ==
Teams are listed as follows:

Teams

| Skip | Third | Second | Lead | Locale |
|---|---|---|---|---|
| Wade Kingdon | Rod Feltham | Dan deWaard | Greg Howard | Iqaluit |
| Shane Latimer | Sheldon Wettig | Brady St. Louis | Christian Smitheram | Iqaluit |
| Peter Mackey | Mark Pillsworth | Larry Mackey | Jeff Nadeau | Iqaluit |
| Peter Van Strien | Scott Shannon | Justin McDonnell | Nick Murray | Iqaluit |

== Round-Robin Standings ==
Final Standings

Key
| Teams to Final |

| Skip | W | L |
|---|---|---|
| Shane Latimer | 5 | 1 |
| Wade Kingdon | 4 | 2 |
| Peter Van Strien | 2 | 3 |
| Peter Mackey | 0 | 5 |

== Round-robin results ==
All draw times are listed in Eastern Standard Time (UTC−05:00).

=== Draw 1 ===
Thursday, December 14, 7:00 pm

| Team | 1 | 2 | 3 | 4 | 5 | 6 | 7 | 8 | 9 | 10 | Final |
|---|---|---|---|---|---|---|---|---|---|---|---|
| Wade Kingdon | 1 | 1 | 4 | 0 | 0 | 3 | 1 | 5 | X | X | 15 |
| Peter Van Strien | 0 | 0 | 0 | 4 | 1 | 0 | 0 | 0 | X | X | 5 |

| Team | 1 | 2 | 3 | 4 | 5 | 6 | 7 | 8 | 9 | 10 | Final |
|---|---|---|---|---|---|---|---|---|---|---|---|
| Shane Latimer | 0 | 0 | 0 | 1 | 0 | 0 | 1 | 0 | 1 | 2 | 5 |
| Peter Mackey | 0 | 1 | 0 | 0 | 1 | 0 | 0 | 2 | 0 | 0 | 4 |

=== Draw 2 ===
Friday, December 15, 2:00 pm

| Team | 1 | 2 | 3 | 4 | 5 | 6 | 7 | 8 | 9 | 10 | Final |
|---|---|---|---|---|---|---|---|---|---|---|---|
| Shane Latimer | 1 | 0 | 3 | 0 | 0 | 1 | 0 | 0 | 1 | 0 | 6 |
| Peter Van Strien | 0 | 2 | 0 | 1 | 1 | 0 | 2 | 1 | 0 | 1 | 8 |

| Team | 1 | 2 | 3 | 4 | 5 | 6 | 7 | 8 | 9 | 10 | Final |
|---|---|---|---|---|---|---|---|---|---|---|---|
| Wade Kingdon | 0 | 2 | 1 | 0 | 4 | 0 | 2 | 1 | 1 | X | 11 |
| Peter Mackey | 1 | 0 | 0 | 3 | 0 | 2 | 0 | 0 | 0 | X | 6 |

=== Draw 3 ===
Friday, December 15, 7:00 pm

| Team | 1 | 2 | 3 | 4 | 5 | 6 | 7 | 8 | 9 | 10 | Final |
|---|---|---|---|---|---|---|---|---|---|---|---|
| Peter Mackey | 1 | 0 | 2 | 0 | 0 | 0 | 4 | 0 | 0 | X | 7 |
| Peter Van Strien | 0 | 3 | 0 | 3 | 1 | 4 | 0 | 1 | 1 | X | 13 |

| Team | 1 | 2 | 3 | 4 | 5 | 6 | 7 | 8 | 9 | 10 | 11 | Final |
|---|---|---|---|---|---|---|---|---|---|---|---|---|
| Wade Kingdon | 0 | 0 | 1 | 1 | 0 | 1 | 1 | 0 | 1 | 0 | 0 | 5 |
| Shane Latimer | 0 | 1 | 0 | 0 | 2 | 0 | 0 | 1 | 0 | 1 | 2 | 7 |

=== Draw 4 ===
Saturday, December 16, 10:00 am

| Team | 1 | 2 | 3 | 4 | 5 | 6 | 7 | 8 | 9 | 10 | Final |
|---|---|---|---|---|---|---|---|---|---|---|---|
| Shane Latimer | 2 | 1 | 0 | 2 | 0 | 0 | 3 | 0 | 1 | X | 9 |
| Peter Mackey | 0 | 0 | 0 | 0 | 2 | 1 | 0 | 1 | 0 | X | 4 |

| Team | 1 | 2 | 3 | 4 | 5 | 6 | 7 | 8 | 9 | 10 | Final |
|---|---|---|---|---|---|---|---|---|---|---|---|
| Wade Kingdon | 2 | 0 | 1 | 1 | 0 | 2 | 1 | 0 | 2 | X | 9 |
| Peter Van Strien | 0 | 2 | 0 | 0 | 2 | 0 | 0 | 1 | 0 | X | 5 |

=== Draw 5 ===
Saturday, December 16, 3:00 pm

| Team | 1 | 2 | 3 | 4 | 5 | 6 | 7 | 8 | 9 | 10 | Final |
|---|---|---|---|---|---|---|---|---|---|---|---|
| Wade Kingdon | 0 | 1 | 2 | 0 | 4 | 0 | 2 | 1 | X | X | 10 |
| Peter Mackey | 3 | 0 | 0 | 2 | 0 | 1 | 0 | 0 | X | X | 6 |

| Team | 1 | 2 | 3 | 4 | 5 | 6 | 7 | 8 | 9 | 10 | Final |
|---|---|---|---|---|---|---|---|---|---|---|---|
| Shane Latimer | 0 | 0 | 5 | 0 | 3 | 5 | X | X | X | X | 13 |
| Peter Van Strien | 1 | 2 | 0 | 1 | 0 | 0 | X | X | X | X | 4 |

=== Draw 6 ===
Sunday, December 17, 10:00 am

| Team | 1 | 2 | 3 | 4 | 5 | 6 | 7 | 8 | 9 | 10 | Final |
|---|---|---|---|---|---|---|---|---|---|---|---|
| Wade Kingdon | 2 | 0 | 0 | 1 | 0 | 0 | 2 | 0 | X | X | 5 |
| Shane Latimer | 0 | 3 | 1 | 0 | 1 | 1 | 0 | 5 | X | X | 11 |

| Team | 1 | 2 | 3 | 4 | 5 | 6 | 7 | 8 | 9 | 10 | Final |
|---|---|---|---|---|---|---|---|---|---|---|---|
| Peter Mackey | | | | | | | | | | | |
| Peter Van Strien | | | | | | | | | | | |

- As both Mackey and Van Strien were already eliminated from contention, this game was not played

== Final ==
Sunday, December 17, 3:00 pm

| Team | 1 | 2 | 3 | 4 | 5 | 6 | 7 | 8 | 9 | 10 | Final |
|---|---|---|---|---|---|---|---|---|---|---|---|
| Wade Kingdon | 0 | 1 | 0 | 0 | 0 | 2 | 0 | X | X | X | 3 |
| Shane Latimer | 0 | 0 | 0 | 3 | 3 | 0 | 5 | X | X | X | 11 |

2024 Men's Territorials Champion

Shane Latimer
1st Nunavut Territorial Championship title
