= 2024 Newfoundland and Labrador Tankard =

- Host city: St. John's, Newfoundland and Labrador
- Arena: RE/MAX Centre
- Dates: January 23–28
- Winner: Team Symonds
- Curling club: RE/MAX Centre, St. John's
- Skip: Andrew Symonds
- Third: Colin Thomas
- Second: Stephen Trickett
- Lead: Alex Smith
- Alternate: Keith Jewer
- Finalist: Greg Smith

The 2024 Newfoundland and Labrador Tankard, the men's provincial curling championship for Newfoundland and Labrador, was held from January 23 to 28 at the RE/MAX Centre in St. John's, Newfoundland and Labrador. The winning Andrew Symonds rink represented Newfoundland and Labrador at the 2024 Montana's Brier in Regina, Saskatchewan. The event was held in conjunction with the 2024 Newfoundland and Labrador Scotties Tournament of Hearts, the provincial women's championship.

== Teams ==
The teams are listed as follows:

Skip	Third	Second	Lead	Alternate	Club
Dylan Hancock	Jacob Hatcher	Jack Furlong	Jake Young		RE/MAX Centre, St. John's
Ryan McNeil Lamswood	Daniel Bruce	Graeme Weagle	Aaron Feltham		RE/MAX Centre, St. John's
Matthew Blandford (Fourth)	Trent Skanes (Skip)	Spencer Wicks	Mike Mosher		RE/MAX Centre, St. John's
Greg Smith	Chris Ford	Zach Young	Zack Shurtleff	Adam Boland	RE/MAX Centre, St. John's
Andrew Symonds	Colin Thomas	Stephen Trickett	Alex Smith	Keith Jewer	RE/MAX Centre, St. John's
Dave Thomas	Mike Mullins	Devon Ryan	Floyd Francis	Murray Hupman	Gateway CC, Port aux Basques
Parker Tipple	Liam Quinlan	Jack Kinsella	Spencer Tipple		RE/MAX Centre, St. John's
Harold Walters	Scott Eaton	Evan Kearley	Steve Routledge	Shawn Hawco	RE/MAX Centre, St. John's
Nathan Young	Sam Follett	Nicholas Codner (Note: Nicholas Codner spared for Nathan Locke who was in South Korea watching his sister Cailey Locke compete at the 2024 Winter Youth Olympics.)	Ben Stringer		RE/MAX Centre, St. John's

== Round robin standings ==
Final Round Robin Standings

Key
Teams to Playoffs
Teams to Tiebreaker

Skip	W	L	PF	PA	EW	EL	BE	SE
Greg Smith	7	1	68	33	35	24	0	14
Ryan McNeil Lamswood	6	2	54	39	36	26	5	19
Nathan Young	6	2	51	36	27	22	8	8
Andrew Symonds	6	2	57	34	38	26	4	18
Trent Skanes	3	5	40	40	25	26	1	7
Parker Tipple	3	5	38	49	26	31	5	10
Dylan Hancock	2	6	33	57	19	31	0	4
Harold Walters	2	6	40	60	25	33	4	7
Dave Thomas	1	7	33	66	22	34	3	5

== Round robin results ==
All draws are listed in Newfoundland Time (UTC−03:30).

=== Draw 1 ===
Tuesday, January 23, 1:30 pm

Sheet 3	1	2	3	4	5	6	7	8	9	10	Final
Ryan McNeil Lamswood	0	2	1	0	1	2	1	1	X	X	8
Harold Walters	2	0	0	2	0	0	0	0	X	X	4

Sheet 4	1	2	3	4	5	6	7	8	9	10	Final
Trent Skanes	4	2	0	1	0	0	4	X	X	X	11
Dave Thomas	0	0	1	0	2	1	0	X	X	X	4

Sheet 5	1	2	3	4	5	6	7	8	9	10	Final
Greg Smith	2	0	3	2	0	3	X	X	X	X	10
Parker Tipple	0	1	0	0	2	0	X	X	X	X	3

Sheet 6	1	2	3	4	5	6	7	8	9	10	Final
Dylan Hancock	0	0	1	0	1	0	X	X	X	X	2
Andrew Symonds	2	1	0	5	0	3	X	X	X	X	11

=== Draw 2 ===
Tuesday, January 23, 7:00 pm

Sheet 3	1	2	3	4	5	6	7	8	9	10	Final
Dylan Hancock	0	3	0	1	0	1	0	0	0	0	5
Nathan Young	2	0	0	0	2	0	0	0	1	2	7

Sheet 4	1	2	3	4	5	6	7	8	9	10	Final
Greg Smith	1	0	2	1	1	0	0	0	0	0	5
Andrew Symonds	0	1	0	0	0	2	1	1	1	2	8

Sheet 5	1	2	3	4	5	6	7	8	9	10	Final
Ryan McNeil Lamswood	0	0	0	0	0	3	2	1	0	1	7
Trent Skanes	1	1	1	0	1	0	0	0	2	0	6

Sheet 6	1	2	3	4	5	6	7	8	9	10	Final
Dave Thomas	0	0	1	0	3	0	0	0	2	X	6
Harold Walters	0	2	0	1	0	3	1	1	0	X	8

=== Draw 3 ===
Wednesday, January 24, 10:00 am

Sheet 3	1	2	3	4	5	6	7	8	9	10	Final
Trent Skanes	0	0	1	0	1	1	0	0	1	X	4
Greg Smith	2	3	0	1	0	0	1	1	0	X	8

Sheet 4	1	2	3	4	5	6	7	8	9	10	Final
Dylan Hancock	0	0	0	2	0	0	0	X	X	X	2
Ryan McNeil Lamswood	0	1	1	0	1	3	2	X	X	X	8

Sheet 5	1	2	3	4	5	6	7	8	9	10	Final
Andrew Symonds	0	0	1	0	4	0	1	1	X	X	7
Harold Walters	0	0	0	1	0	1	0	0	X	X	2

Sheet 6	1	2	3	4	5	6	7	8	9	10	Final
Parker Tipple	0	0	0	1	0	0	0	X	X	X	1
Nathan Young	0	1	1	0	2	2	1	X	X	X	7

=== Draw 4 ===
Wednesday, January 24, 3:30 pm

Sheet 3	1	2	3	4	5	6	7	8	9	10	Final
Ryan McNeil Lamswood	0	1	2	0	2	0	1	0	0	2	8
Andrew Symonds	2	0	0	2	0	1	0	1	1	0	7

Sheet 4	1	2	3	4	5	6	7	8	9	10	Final
Parker Tipple	0	2	1	0	0	0	X	X	X	X	3
Harold Walters	3	0	0	1	3	2	X	X	X	X	9

Sheet 5	1	2	3	4	5	6	7	8	9	10	Final
Dave Thomas	1	0	0	0	X	X	X	X	X	X	1
Nathan Young	0	4	4	0	X	X	X	X	X	X	8

Sheet 6	1	2	3	4	5	6	7	8	9	10	Final
Dylan Hancock	1	0	0	1	X	X	X	X	X	X	2
Greg Smith	0	6	4	0	X	X	X	X	X	X	10

=== Draw 5 ===
Thursday, January 25, 1:30 pm

Sheet 3	1	2	3	4	5	6	7	8	9	10	Final
Dave Thomas	0	0	0	2	1	0	0	0	X	X	3
Parker Tipple	0	2	2	0	0	1	1	3	X	X	9

Sheet 4	1	2	3	4	5	6	7	8	9	10	Final
Andrew Symonds	0	1	0	2	0	1	0	0	1	0	5
Nathan Young	0	0	1	0	1	0	1	3	0	1	7

Sheet 5	1	2	3	4	5	6	7	8	9	10	Final
Ryan McNeil Lamswood	1	0	0	0	2	1	0	0	2	0	6
Greg Smith	0	1	1	1	0	0	3	1	0	2	9

Sheet 6	1	2	3	4	5	6	7	8	9	10	Final
Trent Skanes	4	2	0	1	0	2	X	X	X	X	9
Harold Walters	0	0	1	0	1	0	X	X	X	X	2

=== Draw 6 ===
Thursday, January 25, 7:00 pm

Sheet 2	1	2	3	4	5	6	7	8	9	10	Final
Greg Smith	1	2	0	2	2	0	1	X	X	X	8
Harold Walters	0	0	1	0	0	2	0	X	X	X	3

Sheet 4	1	2	3	4	5	6	7	8	9	10	Final
Trent Skanes	1	1	0	1	0	2	0	1	0	X	6
Parker Tipple	0	0	1	0	1	0	2	0	0	X	4

Sheet 5	1	2	3	4	5	6	7	8	9	10	Final
Dylan Hancock	0	0	0	2	0	1	0	0	4	0	7
Dave Thomas	0	1	1	0	2	0	2	1	0	2	9

Sheet 6	1	2	3	4	5	6	7	8	9	10	Final
Ryan McNeil Lamswood	0	0	0	0	2	1	2	2	X	X	7
Nathan Young	0	0	1	0	0	0	0	0	X	X	1

=== Draw 7 ===
Friday, January 26, 1:30 pm

Sheet 1	1	2	3	4	5	6	7	8	9	10	Final
Dylan Hancock	2	0	0	1	0	0	2	0	0	0	5
Parker Tipple	0	1	1	0	0	1	0	1	1	1	6

Sheet 4	1	2	3	4	5	6	7	8	9	10	Final
Ryan McNeil Lamswood	0	0	1	1	1	0	1	0	2	X	6
Dave Thomas	0	0	0	0	0	1	0	1	0	X	2

Sheet 5	1	2	3	4	5	6	7	8	9	10	Final
Harold Walters	1	0	1	0	2	0	2	0	0	X	6
Nathan Young	0	1	0	4	0	1	0	3	0	X	9

Sheet 6	1	2	3	4	5	6	7	8	9	10	Final
Trent Skanes	1	0	0	1	0	0	0	0	0	X	2
Andrew Symonds	0	0	2	0	1	0	1	1	1	X	6

=== Draw 8 ===
Friday, January 26, 7:00 pm

Sheet 3	1	2	3	4	5	6	7	8	9	10	Final
Trent Skanes	0	2	0	0	0	X	X	X	X	X	2
Nathan Young	2	0	3	2	2	X	X	X	X	X	9

Sheet 4	1	2	3	4	5	6	7	8	9	10	Final
Dylan Hancock	0	2	1	1	0	0	0	3	3	X	10
Harold Walters	1	0	0	0	1	2	2	0	0	X	6

Sheet 5	1	2	3	4	5	6	7	8	9	10	Final
Andrew Symonds	0	0	0	1	1	1	1	0	1	0	5
Parker Tipple	0	0	1	0	0	0	0	2	0	1	4

Sheet 6	1	2	3	4	5	6	7	8	9	10	Final
Greg Smith	2	0	2	1	0	0	2	2	X	X	9
Dave Thomas	0	2	0	0	0	2	0	0	X	X	4

=== Draw 9 ===
Saturday, January 27, 9:00 am

Sheet 2	1	2	3	4	5	6	7	8	9	10	Final
Andrew Symonds	0	2	0	0	1	1	1	0	3	X	8
Dave Thomas	0	0	2	1	0	0	0	1	0	X	4

Sheet 4	1	2	3	4	5	6	7	8	9	10	Final
Greg Smith	4	0	2	1	0	0	2	X	X	X	9
Nathan Young	0	2	0	0	0	1	0	X	X	X	3

Sheet 5	Final
Dylan Hancock	W
Trent Skanes (Note: Team Skanes forfeited their final match against the Dylan Hancock rink.)	L

Sheet 6	1	2	3	4	5	6	7	8	9	10	Final
Ryan McNeil Lamswood	0	1	0	0	0	2	1	0	0	X	4
Parker Tipple	0	0	3	1	1	0	0	0	3	X	8

== Tiebreaker ==
Saturday, January 27, 7:30 pm

Sheet 5	1	2	3	4	5	6	7	8	9	10	11	Final
Nathan Young	0	1	0	0	0	4	0	0	0	1	0	6
Andrew Symonds	1	0	0	2	0	0	2	0	1	0	1	7

== Playoffs ==
Semifinal			Final
			1	Greg Smith	5
2	Ryan McNeil Lamswood	3	3	Andrew Symonds	7
3	Andrew Symonds	6

=== Semifinal ===
Sunday, January 28, 9:00 am

Sheet 4	1	2	3	4	5	6	7	8	9	10	Final
Ryan McNeil Lamswood	0	0	1	0	0	0	1	1	0	X	3
Andrew Symonds	0	1	0	2	1	1	0	0	1	X	6

=== Final ===
Sunday, January 28, 2:30 pm

Sheet 4	1	2	3	4	5	6	7	8	9	10	Final
Greg Smith	2	1	0	0	1	0	0	0	1	X	5
Andrew Symonds	0	0	0	2	0	2	1	2	0	X	7

2024 Newfoundland & Labrador Tankard
(Newfoundland and Labrador)
Andrew Symonds
2nd Newfoundland & Labrador Provincial Championship title
