= 2024 Montana's Brier =

Canada's men's curling championship

- Host city: Regina, Saskatchewan
- Arena: Brandt Centre
- Dates: March 1–10
- Attendance: 101,401
- Winner: Canada
- Curling club: St. John's CC, St. John's, NL
- Skip: Brad Gushue
- Third: Mark Nichols
- Second: E. J. Harnden
- Lead: Geoff Walker
- Coach: Caleb Flaxey
- Finalist: Saskatchewan (Mike McEwen)

The 2024 Montana's Brier, Canada's national men's curling championship, was held from March 1 to 10 at the Brandt Centre in Regina, Saskatchewan. Team Canada, who was skipped by Brad Gushue won their third straight Brier Tankard and represented Canada at the 2024 World Men's Curling Championship at the KSS Sports Complex in Schaffhausen, Switzerland where they won the silver medal.

This was the first Brier under the sponsorship of Montana's BBQ & Bar, following the departure of Tim Hortons as a sponsor.

== Summary ==
During Draw 1 action, a heckler was ejected from the arena. Team Canada skip Brad Gushue asked for the spectator to be removed in the ninth end of his game against Nova Scotia. When Gushue was about to throw his final rock of the end, he signalled a technical timeout to deal with the matter, as the fan was distracting the team from the front row. After Team Canada second E.J. Harnden spoke to the fan, and "got into it" with him, the team decided the matter had to be dealt with.

Newfoundland and Labrador lead Alex Smith broke the previous record for longest gap between Brier appearances at 35 years. The last previous Brier he competed in was in 1989 when he threw third stones for Newfoundland. The previous record was 24 years held by the Yukon's Clinton Abel and Scott Odian (1995 to 2019).

March 4th saw numerous upsets. Draw 7 alone saw three upsets with the Northwest Territories team (skipped by Jamie Koe) defeating the defending champion Team Canada rink (Gushue), Nova Scotia (Matthew Manuel) defeating Alberta's Aaron Sluchinski rink and Quebec (Julien Tremblay) defeating Kevin Koe's foursome. Draw 8 saw Northern Ontario (Trevor Bonot) upend the #1 seeded Brendan Bottcher rink and Draw 9 saw Nova Scotia with another upset, beating previously undefeated Saskatchewan (Mike McEwen).

On March 5, team Kevin Koe, the third ranked team in the country, was eliminated from playoff contention after losing their fifth game, and having a 1–5 record. Koe called the feeling "about rock bottom". Koe blamed the team's failure on their draw weight.

Following their Draw 15 win against Nunavut, Saskatchewan became the first team to clinch a playoff spot on March 6. They also clinched first place in their group, Pool B. Team Manitoba (Carruthers), skipped by Brad Jacobs, became the second team to clinch a playoff berth following their morning game on March 7 against Yukon (Thomas Scoffin). Later in the day, Team Canada (Gushue) and the Northwest Territories (Jamie Koe) also clinched berths. It was the first time the Territories have made the playoffs since 2012 when Koe also skipped the team. It was also the first time in his 17 Brier appearances that Jamie Koe finished with a better record (5–3) than his brother, Kevin (2–6) who skipped one of the Alberta pre-qualifier teams. The NWT made the playoffs after beating PEI (Tyler Smith) 9–8 in an extra end in their final game. PEI would have made the playoffs instead had they won, which would've been their first playoff berth in 28 years.

The playoffs began on March 8, with the 1 vs. 2 page qualifying games. Manitoba (Carruthers) who finished first in Pool A played Team Canada, who finished second in Pool B, while Saskatchewan who finished first in Pool B played the Alberta Bottcher rink who finished second in Pool A. Team Canada, skipped by Brad Gushue won their game 9–7. In the other game, Team Bottcher prevailed 9–7 despite a burnt rock in the 10th end (lead Ben Hebert touched one of third Marc Kennedy's stones while sweeping). The Carruthers team's loss to Canada put them against the other Manitoba rink at the event, team Matt Dunstone in the page 3 vs. 4 qualifying game, while Saskatchewan played the Northwest Territories in the other 3 vs. 4 qualifying game. Dunstone beat the Carruthers rink 6–2, while Saskatchewan, with skip Mike McEwen, easily beat the Territories 7–0, thanks to six stolen single point ends.

March 9 featured the first round of the page playoff, with Gushue and Team Canada playing off against Bottcher in the 1 vs. 2 game, and McEwen with Team Saskatchewan taking on Dunstone. In the evening's Bottcher–Gushue game, skip Brendan Bottcher missed a "tricky double" in the eighth in an attempt to score a three-ender, and missed a triple takeout attempt in the ninth, giving up steals of one in both ends. With the score 7–3 for Gushue's Team Canada rink, Bottcher and company conceded the game after the ninth end. Meanwhile in the afternoon game, McEwen beat Dunstone 6–5 thanks to a McEwen making a hit against three in the 10th end to secure victory, which was followed by a standing ovation from the partisan Saskatchewan audience.

March 10, the final day of competition started with the semifinal between Bottcher's top-seeded Alberta rink against the host Saskatchewan team. The host team, skipped by Mike McEwen won the match 7–3 sending Saskatchewan to its first Brier final since 1995. The win was cemented by Saskatchewan scoring threes in the third and seventh ends. Bottcher conceded the game after nine ends. By winning the semi, Saskatchewan then played Team Canada in the final that evening. In the final, Team Canada, skipped by Brad Gushue, got off to a strong start when Gushue made two perfect draws to the button to take a 2–0 lead in the second end, after blanking the first. In fourth end, they took a commanding 5–1 lead after Gushue split a rock outside the house into the rings to score three points. After getting forced to a single in five, Saskatchewan had a strong sixth end though thanks to missed peel attempts by Canada. McEwen drew to sit three counters around the button on his last stone of the end. Gushue made a tap on one of the McEwen stones which a measurement revealed was just enough to cut Saskatchewan down to a steal of two points. In the seventh end however, Gushue made a thin double takeout to get two back, to take a 7–4 lead. In the eighth, Saskatchewan third Colton Flasch missed an attempted triple takeout, which would eventually result in McEwen being forced to draw for a single. In the ninth, McEwen hogged his first rock, which would result in Gushue having the opportunity to make a double for two on his last. This gave Canada a 9–5 lead, and Saskatchewan then conceded the match, giving Gushue the victory. It was the sixth Brier title for Gushue, his third Mark Nichols and lead Geoff Walker, tying a Brier record with Randy Ferbey. It was also the third straight Brier win for the team, also tying a record set by Ferbey.

== Teams ==
A total of eighteen teams qualified for the 2024 Brier. The fourteen Canadian curling member associations held playdowns to determine who would represent their province or territory. Team Canada is represented by Team Brad Gushue, who won their second consecutive Brier championship at the 2023 Tim Hortons Brier.

In a change in the qualification format, the Brendan Bottcher and Matt Dunstone rinks automatically pre-qualified for the 2024 Brier field based on their 2022–23 Canadian Team Ranking Standings, which meant they bypassed the provincial qualifiers. A fourth qualifying team, Kevin Koe, joined the field as the top non-qualified team on the 2023–24 CTRS standings following provincial and territorial playdowns.

The teams are listed as follows:

Canada	Alberta (Sluchinski)	British Columbia
St. John's CC, St. John's Skip: Brad Gushue; Third: Mark Nichols; Second: E.J. Harnden; Lead: Geoff Walker	Airdrie CC, Airdrie Skip: Aaron Sluchinski; Third: Jeremy Harty; Second: Kerr Drummond; Lead: Dylan Webster	Victoria CC, Victoria Skip: Catlin Schneider; Third: Jason Ginter; Second: Sterling Middleton; Lead: Alex Horvath; Alternate: Bryan Miki
Manitoba (Carruthers)	New Brunswick	Newfoundland and Labrador
Granite CC, Winnipeg Skip: Brad Jacobs; Third: Reid Carruthers; Second: Derek Samagalski; Lead: Connor Njegovan	Gage G&CC, Oromocto Skip: James Grattan; Third: Joel Krats; Second: Paul Dobson; Lead: Andy McCann (Note: Team New Brunswick's alternate Drew Grattan threw lead stones for the final three ends of Draw 14.); Alternate: Drew Grattan	RE/MAX Centre, St. John's Skip: Andrew Symonds; Third: Colin Thomas (Note: For the final four ends of Draw 6, Team Newfoundland and Labrador's alternate Dave Noftall threw second stones, second Stephen Trickett threw third stones, and third Colin Thomas sat out.) (Note: Team Newfoundland and Labrador alternate Dave Noftall threw third stones in Draw 8.); Second: Stephen Trickett; Lead: Alex Smith; Alternate: Dave Noftall
Northern Ontario	Nova Scotia	Ontario
Fort William CC, Thunder Bay Skip: Trevor Bonot; Third: Mike McCarville; Second: Jordan Potts; Lead: Kurtis Byrd	Halifax CC, Halifax Skip: Matthew Manuel; Third: Luke Saunders; Second: Jeffrey Meagher; Lead: Nick Zachernuk	Penetangishene CC, Penetanguishene Skip: Scott Howard; Third: David Mathers; Second: Mathew Camm; Lead: Tim March; Alternate: Glenn Howard
Prince Edward Island	Quebec	Saskatchewan
Crapaud Community CC, Crapaud Skip: Tyler Smith; Third: Adam Cocks; Second: Christopher Gallant; Lead: Ed White	CC Etchemin, Lévis, CC Chicoutimi, Chicoutimi & CC Kénogami, Kénogami Skip: Julien Tremblay; Third: Jean-Michel Arsenault; Second: Jesse Mullen; Lead: Phillipe Brassard; Alternate: Vincent Roberge	Nutana CC, Saskatoon Skip: Mike McEwen; Third: Colton Flasch; Second: Kevin Marsh; Lead: Dan Marsh; Alternate: Pat Simmons
Northwest Territories	Nunavut	Yukon
Yellowknife CC, Yellowknife Skip: Jamie Koe; Third: Glen Kennedy; Second: Cole Parsons; Lead: Shadrach McLeod (Note: Team Northwest Territories alternate Stephen Robertson threw lead stones in the final end of Draw 9.); Alternate: Stephen Robertson	Iqaluit CC, Iqaluit Skip: Shane Latimer; Third: Sheldon Wettig (Note: For the final end of Draw 9, Team Nunavut's alternate Peter Van Strien threw lead stones, lead Christian Smitheram threw second stones, second Brady St. Louis threw third stones, and third Sheldon Wettig sat out.); Second: Brady St. Louis (Note: For the final end of Draw 15, Team Nunavut's alternate Peter Van Strien threw lead stones, lead Christian Smitheram threw second stones, while second Brady St. Louis sat out.); Lead: Christian Smitheram (Note: Team Nunavut's alternate Peter Van Strien threw lead stones in the final three ends of Draw 11.); Alternate: Peter Van Strien	Whitehorse CC, Whitehorse Skip: Thomas Scoffin; Third: Trygg Jensen; Second: Joe Wallingham (Note: Team Yukon's alternate Wade Scoffin threw second stones for the final three ends of Draw 8, the final six ends of Draw 14, and all of Draws 10 and 16.) (Note: For all of Draws 12 and 18 and the first two ends of Draw 14, Team Yukon's lead Evan Latos threw second stones while second Joe Wallingham threw lead stones.); Lead: Evan Latos; Alternate: Wade Scoffin
Alberta (Bottcher)	Manitoba (Dunstone)	Alberta (Koe)
The Glencoe Club, Calgary & Saville Community SC, Edmonton Skip: Brendan Bottcher; Third: Marc Kennedy; Second: Brett Gallant; Lead: Ben Hebert (Note: Team Alberta (Bottcher)'s alternate Paul Webster threw lead stones for the final three ends of Draw 14.); Alternate: Paul Webster	Fort Rouge CC, Winnipeg Skip: Matt Dunstone; Third: B.J. Neufeld; Second: Colton Lott; Lead: Ryan Harnden (Note: Team Manitoba (Dunstone)'s alternate Rob Gordon threw lead stones in the last end of Draws 8 and 18.); Alternate: Rob Gordon	The Glencoe Club, Calgary Skip: Kevin Koe; Third: Tyler Tardi; Second: Jacques Gauthier; Lead: Karrick Martin

=== CTRS Rankings ===
As of February 19, 2024

Member Association (Skip)	Rank	Points
Alberta (Bottcher)	1	351.750
Canada (Gushue)	2	238.875
Alberta (K. Koe)	3	209.500
Manitoba (Dunstone)	4	198.750
Manitoba (Carruthers)	5	187.188
Saskatchewan (McEwen)	6	183.125
Alberta (Sluchinski)	7	162.750
Ontario (Howard)	12	105.625
British Columbia (Schneider)	15	105.063
Quebec (Tremblay)	26	59.375
Nova Scotia (Manuel)	30	49.125
New Brunswick (Grattan)	31	48.750
Northern Ontario (Bonot)	60	23.750
Prince Edward Island (Smith)	76	13.875
Northwest Territories (J. Koe)	93	9.625
Newfoundland and Labrador (Symonds)	95	9.250
Nunavut (Latimer)	NR	0.000
Yukon (Scoffin)	NR	0.000

== Map of teams ==
Team Canada Pre-Qualified Teams Provincial Winners Wild-Card Teams

== Wild card selection ==
Previously, three wild card berths were allocated to the top teams in the Canadian Team Ranking System (CTRS) standings who did not win their provincial/territorial championship. Beginning with this year's Brier, Curling Canada changed the qualification format where the top two teams from the previous year's CTRS would receive an automatic pre-qualification berth without having to qualify. The final berth will be given to the team with the highest CTRS ranking who did not win their provincial/territorial championship.

CTRS standings for wild card selection
Rank	Team	Member Association	Eligibility
1	~~Brendan Bottcher~~	Alberta	Received pre-qualification berth (ineligible)
2	~~Brad Gushue~~	Newfoundland and Labrador	Qualified as Team Canada (ineligible)
3	Kevin Koe	Alberta	Eliminated from provincials

== Round robin standings ==
Final Round Robin Standings

Key
Teams to Championship Round

Pool A	Skip	W	L	W–L	PF	PA	EW	EL	BE	SE	S%	LSD
Manitoba (Carruthers)	Brad Jacobs	7	1	–	56	41	35	29	12	5	86%	208.8
Alberta (Bottcher)	Brendan Bottcher	6	2	1–0	66	32	31	26	7	7	91%	172.0
Manitoba (Dunstone)	Matt Dunstone	6	2	0–1	70	41	35	30	5	9	88%	199.5
Northern Ontario	Trevor Bonot	5	3	–	57	50	35	31	4	7	84%	433.4
British Columbia	Catlin Schneider	4	4	–	51	46	34	27	4	11	87%	416.1
Ontario	Scott Howard	3	5	–	48	50	29	32	10	6	85%	386.7
Newfoundland and Labrador	Andrew Symonds	2	6	1–0	37	59	27	32	7	5	80%	569.5
Yukon	Thomas Scoffin	2	6	0–1	38	68	26	33	3	4	82%	436.3
New Brunswick	James Grattan	1	7	–	36	72	23	35	4	2	80%	568.4

Pool B	Skip	W	L	W–L	PF	PA	EW	EL	BE	SE	S%	LSD
Saskatchewan	Mike McEwen	7	1	–	61	41	36	31	4	11	88%	371.5
Canada	Brad Gushue	6	2	–	64	38	33	30	5	7	90%	239.6
Northwest Territories	Jamie Koe	5	3	1–0	50	54	35	34	2	11	82%	915.9
Prince Edward Island	Tyler Smith	5	3	0–1	65	50	35	33	2	6	83%	326.6
Nova Scotia	Matthew Manuel	4	4	1–0	53	49	35	30	5	9	86%	329.7
Alberta (Sluchinski)	Aaron Sluchinski	4	4	0–1	57	61	33	34	6	5	83%	377.2
Quebec	Julien Tremblay	2	6	1–0	57	59	34	33	2	7	82%	224.2
Alberta (Koe)	Kevin Koe	2	6	0–1	40	61	30	34	2	5	80%	511.5
Nunavut	Shane Latimer	1	7	–	36	70	26	38	5	3	73%	759.4

Pool A Round Robin Summary Table
Pos.	Team	(Alberta) AB–B	(British Columbia) BC	(Manitoba) MB–C	(Manitoba) MB–D	(New Brunswick) NB	(Newfoundland and Labrador) NL	(Northern Ontario) NO	(Ontario) ON	(Yukon) YT	Record
2	Alberta (Bottcher)	—	9–4	3–6	7–5	15–3	11–3	5–6	8–2	8–3	6–2
5	British Columbia	4–9	—	9–8	5–8	6–3	7–2	4–7	5–7	11–2	4–4
1	Manitoba (Carruthers)	6–3	8–9	—	7–5	7–3	6–3	9–8	7–6	6–4	7–1
3	Manitoba (Dunstone)	5–7	8–5	5–7	—	9–6	12–4	8–3	8–7	15–2	6–2
9	New Brunswick	3–15	3–6	3–7	6–9	—	4–10	4–9	6–5	7–11	1–7
7	Newfoundland and Labrador	3–11	2–7	3–6	4–12	10–4	—	6–7	3–7	6–5	2–6
4	Northern Ontario	6–5	7–4	8–9	3–8	9–4	7–6	—	10–6	7–8	5–3
6	Ontario	2–8	7–5	6–7	7–8	5–6	7–3	6–10	—	8–3	3–5
8	Yukon	3–8	2–11	4–6	2–15	11–7	5–6	8–7	3–8	—	2–6

Pool B Round Robin Summary Table
Pos.	Team	(Alberta) AB–K	(Alberta) AB–S	(Canada) CAN	(Northwest Territories) NT	(Nova Scotia) NS	(Nunavut) NU	(Prince Edward Island) PE	(Quebec) QC	(Saskatchewan) SK	Record
8	Alberta (Koe)	—	4–8	3–8	8–4	5–11	6–4	3–9	6–11	5–6	2–6
6	Alberta (Sluchinski)	8–4	—	4–10	10–4	2–6	12–10	5–8	10–8	6–11	4–4
2	Canada	8–3	10–4	—	5–7	7–4	8–3	11–3	9–7	6–7	6–2
3	Northwest Territories	4–8	4–10	7–5	—	8–7	9–2	9–8	7–4	2–10	5–3
5	Nova Scotia	11–5	6–2	4–7	7–8	—	5–7	7–11	6–5	7–4	4–4
9	Nunavut	4–6	10–12	3–8	2–9	7–5	—	3–10	4–11	3–9	1–7
4	Prince Edward Island	9–3	8–5	3–11	8–9	11–7	10–3	—	10–5	6–7	5–3
7	Quebec	11–6	8–10	7–9	4–7	5–6	11–4	5–10	—	6–7	2–6
1	Saskatchewan	6–5	11–6	7–6	10–2	4–7	9–3	7–6	7–6	—	7–1

== Round robin results ==
All draw times are listed in Central Time (UTC−06:00).

=== Draw 1 ===
Friday, March 1, 6:00 pm

Sheet A	1	2	3	4	5	6	7	8	9	10	Final
Nova Scotia (Manuel)	0	1	0	0	0	1	0	2	0	X	4
Canada (Gushue) 🔨	1	0	2	0	0	0	2	0	2	X	7

Sheet B	1	2	3	4	5	6	7	8	9	10	Final
Saskatchewan (McEwen)	0	1	0	2	2	0	0	1	0	1	7
Prince Edward Island (Smith) 🔨	2	0	1	0	0	0	2	0	1	0	6

Sheet C	1	2	3	4	5	6	7	8	9	10	Final
Alberta (K. Koe)	0	0	1	0	1	0	2	0	0	0	4
Alberta (Sluchinski) 🔨	1	2	0	0	0	1	0	1	1	2	8

Sheet D	1	2	3	4	5	6	7	8	9	10	Final
Northwest Territories (J. Koe)	0	0	1	1	0	1	0	2	0	2	7
Quebec (Tremblay) 🔨	0	1	0	0	1	0	1	0	1	0	4

=== Draw 2 ===
Saturday, March 2, 1:00 pm

Sheet A	1	2	3	4	5	6	7	8	9	10	Final
British Columbia (Schneider)	0	0	0	2	0	0	2	1	0	0	5
Ontario (Howard) 🔨	0	0	3	0	0	1	0	0	0	3	7

Sheet B	1	2	3	4	5	6	7	8	9	10	Final
Manitoba (Carruthers)	0	2	0	1	0	0	1	2	0	1	7
Manitoba (Dunstone) 🔨	0	0	1	0	2	0	0	0	2	0	5

Sheet C	1	2	3	4	5	6	7	8	9	10	Final
Northern Ontario (Bonot) 🔨	0	0	0	4	3	0	2	0	X	X	9
New Brunswick (Grattan)	0	0	0	0	0	2	0	2	X	X	4

Sheet D	1	2	3	4	5	6	7	8	9	10	Final
Newfoundland and Labrador (Symonds)	0	1	0	1	0	0	1	0	X	X	3
Alberta (Bottcher) 🔨	2	0	3	0	0	2	0	4	X	X	11

=== Draw 3 ===
Saturday, March 2, 6:00 pm

Sheet A	1	2	3	4	5	6	7	8	9	10	Final
Quebec (Tremblay) 🔨	2	2	1	0	2	0	2	0	2	X	11
Nunavut (Latimer)	0	0	0	2	0	1	0	1	0	X	4

Sheet B	1	2	3	4	5	6	7	8	9	10	Final
Alberta (K. Koe) 🔨	2	0	1	0	2	1	1	0	1	X	8
Northwest Territories (J. Koe)	0	1	0	2	0	0	0	1	0	X	4

Sheet C	1	2	3	4	5	6	7	8	9	10	Final
Saskatchewan (McEwen) 🔨	2	0	0	2	1	1	0	1	0	0	7
Canada (Gushue)	0	1	1	0	0	0	1	0	2	1	6

Sheet D	1	2	3	4	5	6	7	8	9	10	Final
Prince Edward Island (Smith) 🔨	3	0	1	0	2	1	0	0	4	X	11
Nova Scotia (Manuel)	0	2	0	2	0	0	2	1	0	X	7

=== Draw 4 ===
Sunday, March 3, 9:00 am

Sheet A	1	2	3	4	5	6	7	8	9	10	Final
Alberta (Bottcher) 🔨	0	2	0	0	0	3	0	0	3	X	8
Yukon (Scoffin)	1	0	0	1	0	0	1	0	0	X	3

Sheet B	1	2	3	4	5	6	7	8	9	10	Final
Northern Ontario (Bonot) 🔨	0	1	0	2	1	0	0	1	0	2	7
Newfoundland and Labrador (Symonds)	1	0	2	0	0	1	0	0	2	0	6

Sheet C	1	2	3	4	5	6	7	8	9	10	11	Final
Manitoba (Carruthers) 🔨	1	0	0	0	2	0	1	0	2	0	1	7
Ontario (Howard)	0	0	1	0	0	1	0	1	0	3	0	6

Sheet D	1	2	3	4	5	6	7	8	9	10	Final
Manitoba (Dunstone) 🔨	0	3	0	1	0	3	0	1	0	X	8
British Columbia (Schneider)	0	0	1	0	3	0	0	0	1	X	5

=== Draw 5 ===
Sunday, March 3, 2:00 pm

Sheet A	1	2	3	4	5	6	7	8	9	10	Final
Saskatchewan (McEwen)	0	1	0	2	0	0	0	2	0	1	6
Alberta (K. Koe) 🔨	0	0	2	0	0	2	0	0	1	0	5

Sheet B	1	2	3	4	5	6	7	8	9	10	Final
Canada (Gushue)	0	4	3	0	1	0	0	0	0	1	9
Quebec (Tremblay) 🔨	2	0	0	2	0	2	0	0	1	0	7

Sheet C	1	2	3	4	5	6	7	8	9	10	11	Final
Northwest Territories (J. Koe)	0	0	1	0	0	3	0	1	2	0	1	8
Nova Scotia (Manuel) 🔨	1	1	0	1	0	0	1	0	0	3	0	7

Sheet D	1	2	3	4	5	6	7	8	9	10	Final
Alberta (Sluchinski) 🔨	1	0	0	3	0	1	0	3	0	4	12
Nunavut (Latimer)	0	4	1	0	1	0	2	0	2	0	10

=== Draw 6 ===
Sunday, March 3, 7:00 pm

Sheet A	1	2	3	4	5	6	7	8	9	10	11	Final
Manitoba (Carruthers) 🔨	0	2	0	2	0	2	0	0	2	0	1	9
Northern Ontario (Bonot)	0	0	2	0	2	0	2	0	0	2	0	8

Sheet B	1	2	3	4	5	6	7	8	9	10	Final
Ontario (Howard)	0	0	0	0	0	0	2	0	X	X	2
Alberta (Bottcher) 🔨	0	2	1	0	1	0	0	4	X	X	8

Sheet C	1	2	3	4	5	6	7	8	9	10	Final
Newfoundland and Labrador (Symonds)	0	0	1	1	0	0	0	0	X	X	2
British Columbia (Schneider) 🔨	1	2	0	0	2	0	1	1	X	X	7

Sheet D	1	2	3	4	5	6	7	8	9	10	Final
New Brunswick (Grattan) 🔨	1	0	0	2	0	2	0	2	0	X	7
Yukon (Scoffin)	0	1	0	0	4	0	1	0	5	X	11

=== Draw 7 ===
Monday, March 4, 9:00 am

Sheet A	1	2	3	4	5	6	7	8	9	10	Final
Canada (Gushue) 🔨	2	0	0	0	0	1	0	0	2	0	5
Northwest Territories (J. Koe)	0	1	0	1	2	0	1	1	0	1	7

Sheet B	1	2	3	4	5	6	7	8	9	10	Final
Nova Scotia (Manuel)	0	0	2	0	1	1	1	0	1	X	6
Alberta (Sluchinski) 🔨	0	1	0	0	0	0	0	1	0	X	2

Sheet C	1	2	3	4	5	6	7	8	9	10	Final
Nunavut (Latimer)	0	1	0	1	0	1	0	0	X	X	3
Prince Edward Island (Smith) 🔨	1	0	2	0	2	0	4	1	X	X	10

Sheet D	1	2	3	4	5	6	7	8	9	10	Final
Quebec (Tremblay) 🔨	2	0	3	0	2	0	4	0	X	X	11
Alberta (K. Koe)	0	2	0	2	0	1	0	1	X	X	6

=== Draw 8 ===
Monday, March 4, 2:00 pm

Sheet A	1	2	3	4	5	6	7	8	9	10	Final
Ontario (Howard)	3	0	0	2	0	1	0	0	1	X	7
Newfoundland and Labrador (Symonds) 🔨	0	1	0	0	1	0	0	1	0	X	3

Sheet B	1	2	3	4	5	6	7	8	9	10	Final
British Columbia (Schneider) 🔨	0	3	0	0	1	0	0	1	1	X	6
New Brunswick (Grattan)	0	0	2	0	0	0	1	0	0	X	3

Sheet C	1	2	3	4	5	6	7	8	9	10	Final
Yukon (Scoffin)	0	0	1	0	0	0	0	1	X	X	2
Manitoba (Dunstone) 🔨	0	3	0	2	3	4	3	0	X	X	15

Sheet D	1	2	3	4	5	6	7	8	9	10	Final
Alberta (Bottcher) 🔨	0	2	0	0	2	0	1	0	0	0	5
Northern Ontario (Bonot)	0	0	2	0	0	1	0	1	1	1	6

=== Draw 9 ===
Monday, March 4, 7:00 pm

Sheet A	1	2	3	4	5	6	7	8	9	10	Final
Prince Edward Island (Smith)	0	2	0	1	0	2	0	2	0	1	8
Alberta (Sluchinski) 🔨	1	0	1	0	2	0	1	0	0	0	5

Sheet B	1	2	3	4	5	6	7	8	9	10	Final
Northwest Territories (J. Koe)	1	0	0	3	1	2	0	2	X	X	9
Nunavut (Latimer) 🔨	0	0	1	0	0	0	1	0	X	X	2

Sheet C	1	2	3	4	5	6	7	8	9	10	Final
Canada (Gushue) 🔨	2	0	1	0	0	2	0	3	X	X	8
Alberta (K. Koe)	0	1	0	1	0	0	1	0	X	X	3

Sheet D	1	2	3	4	5	6	7	8	9	10	Final
Nova Scotia (Manuel)	0	0	2	0	1	0	1	0	1	2	7
Saskatchewan (McEwen) 🔨	0	2	0	0	0	1	0	1	0	0	4

=== Draw 10 ===
Tuesday, March 5, 9:00 am

Sheet A	1	2	3	4	5	6	7	8	9	10	Final
Manitoba (Dunstone) 🔨	1	1	0	1	1	0	3	0	0	2	9
New Brunswick (Grattan)	0	0	4	0	0	1	0	1	0	0	6

Sheet B	1	2	3	4	5	6	7	8	9	10	11	Final
Newfoundland and Labrador (Symonds)	0	0	0	0	0	2	2	0	1	0	1	6
Yukon (Scoffin) 🔨	1	0	0	0	0	0	0	1	0	3	0	5

Sheet C	1	2	3	4	5	6	7	8	9	10	Final
Ontario (Howard)	0	1	0	1	0	2	0	2	0	X	6
Northern Ontario (Bonot) 🔨	1	0	1	0	3	0	2	0	3	X	10

Sheet D	1	2	3	4	5	6	7	8	9	10	Final
British Columbia (Schneider)	1	0	2	0	1	2	0	2	0	1	9
Manitoba (Carruthers) 🔨	0	3	0	2	0	0	2	0	1	0	8

=== Draw 11 ===
Tuesday, March 5, 2:00 pm

Sheet A	1	2	3	4	5	6	7	8	9	10	Final
Alberta (K. Koe)	0	1	0	0	0	3	0	1	0	X	5
Nova Scotia (Manuel) 🔨	1	0	2	2	2	0	1	0	3	X	11

Sheet B	1	2	3	4	5	6	7	8	9	10	Final
Alberta (Sluchinski) 🔨	3	0	1	0	1	0	0	1	X	X	6
Saskatchewan (McEwen)	0	3	0	4	0	3	1	0	X	X	11

Sheet C	1	2	3	4	5	6	7	8	9	10	Final
Prince Edward Island (Smith) 🔨	0	1	3	3	0	0	3	0	X	X	10
Quebec (Tremblay)	0	0	0	0	1	1	0	3	X	X	5

Sheet D	1	2	3	4	5	6	7	8	9	10	Final
Nunavut (Latimer)	0	0	0	1	0	1	0	1	X	X	3
Canada (Gushue) 🔨	2	2	2	0	2	0	0	0	X	X	8

=== Draw 12 ===
Tuesday, March 5, 7:00 pm

Sheet A	1	2	3	4	5	6	7	8	9	10	Final
Northern Ontario (Bonot)	1	0	0	1	1	0	2	0	1	1	7
British Columbia (Schneider) 🔨	0	0	2	0	0	1	0	1	0	0	4

Sheet B	1	2	3	4	5	6	7	8	9	10	Final
New Brunswick (Grattan)	0	1	0	1	0	1	0	0	0	X	3
Manitoba (Carruthers) 🔨	1	0	1	0	1	0	0	2	2	X	7

Sheet C	1	2	3	4	5	6	7	8	9	10	Final
Manitoba (Dunstone)	0	1	0	1	0	0	3	0	0	X	5
Alberta (Bottcher) 🔨	1	0	1	0	1	1	0	2	1	X	7

Sheet D	1	2	3	4	5	6	7	8	9	10	Final
Yukon (Scoffin)	0	0	1	1	0	0	1	0	X	X	3
Ontario (Howard) 🔨	1	1	0	0	2	1	0	3	X	X	8

=== Draw 13 ===
Wednesday, March 6, 9:00 am

Sheet A	1	2	3	4	5	6	7	8	9	10	11	Final
Alberta (Sluchinski) 🔨	0	3	0	2	0	0	0	0	3	0	2	10
Quebec (Tremblay)	0	0	2	0	0	2	1	2	0	1	0	8

Sheet B	1	2	3	4	5	6	7	8	9	10	Final
Prince Edward Island (Smith)	0	0	1	0	1	0	1	0	X	X	3
Canada (Gushue) 🔨	3	2	0	2	0	3	0	1	X	X	11

Sheet C	1	2	3	4	5	6	7	8	9	10	Final
Nova Scotia (Manuel)	0	0	0	2	0	2	0	0	1	0	5
Nunavut (Latimer) 🔨	0	0	2	0	1	0	2	1	0	1	7

Sheet D	1	2	3	4	5	6	7	8	9	10	Final
Saskatchewan (McEwen) 🔨	0	1	0	3	0	2	2	2	X	X	10
Northwest Territories (J. Koe)	0	0	1	0	1	0	0	0	X	X	2

=== Draw 14 ===
Wednesday, March 6, 2:00 pm

Sheet A	1	2	3	4	5	6	7	8	9	10	Final
New Brunswick (Grattan)	0	0	2	0	1	0	0	0	X	X	3
Alberta (Bottcher) 🔨	3	1	0	5	0	1	0	5	X	X	15

Sheet B	1	2	3	4	5	6	7	8	9	10	11	Final
Manitoba (Dunstone) 🔨	0	1	0	2	0	3	1	0	0	0	1	8
Ontario (Howard)	0	0	1	0	3	0	0	1	1	1	0	7

Sheet C	1	2	3	4	5	6	7	8	9	10	Final
British Columbia (Schneider) 🔨	1	1	2	0	5	0	1	1	X	X	11
Yukon (Scoffin)	0	0	0	1	0	1	0	0	X	X	2

Sheet D	1	2	3	4	5	6	7	8	9	10	Final
Manitoba (Carruthers) 🔨	0	1	0	1	0	2	0	0	2	X	6
Newfoundland and Labrador (Symonds)	0	0	1	0	1	0	1	0	0	X	3

=== Draw 15 ===
Wednesday, March 6, 7:00 pm

Sheet A	1	2	3	4	5	6	7	8	9	10	Final
Nunavut (Latimer)	0	0	1	0	0	1	0	1	X	X	3
Saskatchewan (McEwen) 🔨	2	1	0	3	1	0	2	0	X	X	9

Sheet B	1	2	3	4	5	6	7	8	9	10	Final
Quebec (Tremblay)	0	0	1	0	0	2	0	0	2	0	5
Nova Scotia (Manuel) 🔨	0	1	0	0	1	0	0	2	0	2	6

Sheet C	1	2	3	4	5	6	7	8	9	10	Final
Alberta (Sluchinski) 🔨	2	0	2	0	0	3	1	2	X	X	10
Northwest Territories (J. Koe)	0	1	0	2	1	0	0	0	X	X	4

Sheet D	1	2	3	4	5	6	7	8	9	10	Final
Alberta (K. Koe)	0	1	0	1	0	0	1	0	X	X	3
Prince Edward Island (Smith) 🔨	1	0	2	0	3	2	0	1	X	X	9

=== Draw 16 ===
Thursday, March 7, 9:00 am

Sheet A	1	2	3	4	5	6	7	8	9	10	Final
Yukon (Scoffin)	0	0	1	1	0	0	1	0	1	X	4
Manitoba (Carruthers) 🔨	0	5	0	0	0	1	0	0	0	X	6

Sheet B	1	2	3	4	5	6	7	8	9	10	Final
Alberta (Bottcher) 🔨	2	0	4	2	0	0	1	0	X	X	9
British Columbia (Schneider)	0	1	0	0	1	1	0	1	X	X	4

Sheet C	1	2	3	4	5	6	7	8	9	10	Final
New Brunswick (Grattan) 🔨	0	1	0	1	0	2	0	0	X	X	4
Newfoundland and Labrador (Symonds)	2	0	2	0	1	0	1	4	X	X	10

Sheet D	1	2	3	4	5	6	7	8	9	10	Final
Northern Ontario (Bonot)	0	1	0	1	0	1	0	0	X	X	3
Manitoba (Dunstone) 🔨	2	0	2	0	1	0	1	2	X	X	8

=== Draw 17 ===
Thursday, March 7, 2:00 pm

Sheet A	1	2	3	4	5	6	7	8	9	10	11	Final
Northwest Territories (J. Koe)	1	0	2	0	2	0	1	0	0	2	1	9
Prince Edward Island (Smith) 🔨	0	1	0	2	0	2	0	3	0	0	0	8

Sheet B	1	2	3	4	5	6	7	8	9	10	Final
Nunavut (Latimer)	0	0	1	0	0	3	0	0	0	X	4
Alberta (K. Koe) 🔨	1	1	0	1	1	0	2	0	0	X	6

Sheet C	1	2	3	4	5	6	7	8	9	10	Final
Quebec (Tremblay) 🔨	1	0	1	0	2	0	0	0	1	1	6
Saskatchewan (McEwen)	0	2	0	1	0	2	1	1	0	0	7

Sheet D	1	2	3	4	5	6	7	8	9	10	Final
Canada (Gushue)	0	3	0	3	0	3	0	1	X	X	10
Alberta (Sluchinski) 🔨	1	0	2	0	0	0	1	0	X	X	4

=== Draw 18 ===
Thursday, March 7, 7:00 pm

Sheet A	1	2	3	4	5	6	7	8	9	10	Final
Newfoundland and Labrador (Symonds)	0	1	0	0	2	0	0	1	X	X	4
Manitoba (Dunstone) 🔨	2	0	3	3	0	4	0	0	X	X	12

Sheet B	1	2	3	4	5	6	7	8	9	10	11	Final
Yukon (Scoffin) 🔨	2	0	0	2	0	2	0	0	1	0	1	8
Northern Ontario (Bonot)	0	1	0	0	3	0	2	0	0	1	0	7

Sheet C	1	2	3	4	5	6	7	8	9	10	Final
Alberta (Bottcher)	0	0	0	2	0	0	0	1	0	0	3
Manitoba (Carruthers) 🔨	0	1	0	0	0	1	1	0	2	1	6

Sheet D	1	2	3	4	5	6	7	8	9	10	Final
Ontario (Howard) 🔨	0	0	2	0	0	1	0	2	0	0	5
New Brunswick (Grattan)	0	0	0	2	1	0	0	0	1	2	6

== Championship round ==
Page 1/2 Qualifier
A1 vs. B2
A1	Manitoba (Carruthers)	7
B2	Canada	9

Page 3/4 Qualifier
A1 vs. A3
A1	Manitoba (Carruthers)	2
A3	Manitoba (Dunstone)	6

Qualified for Playoffs
Canada	To 1 vs. 2 Page
Manitoba (Dunstone)	To 3 vs. 4 Page

Page 1/2 Qualifier
B1 vs. A2
B1	Saskatchewan	7
A2	Alberta (Bottcher)	8

Page 3/4 Qualifier
B1 vs. B3
B1	Saskatchewan	7
B3	Northwest Territories	0

Qualified for Playoffs
Alberta (Bottcher)	To 1 vs. 2 Page
Saskatchewan	To 3 vs. 4 Page

=== Page 1/2 Qualifier ===
Friday, March 8, 1:00 pm

Sheet B	1	2	3	4	5	6	7	8	9	10	Final
Manitoba (Carruthers) 🔨	0	0	0	3	0	2	0	1	1	0	7
Canada (Gushue)	1	0	1	0	3	0	3	0	0	1	9

Player percentages
Manitoba (Carruthers)		Canada	
Connor Njegovan	95%	Geoff Walker	100%
Derek Samagalski	90%	E.J. Harnden	93%
Reid Carruthers	96%	Mark Nichols	90%
Brad Jacobs	85%	Brad Gushue	93%
Total	92%	Total	94%

Sheet D	1	2	3	4	5	6	7	8	9	10	Final
Saskatchewan (McEwen) 🔨	1	0	2	0	2	0	0	0	2	X	7
Alberta (Bottcher)	0	2	0	2	0	2	0	2	0	X	8

Player percentages
Saskatchewan		Alberta (Bottcher)	
Dan Marsh	94%	Ben Hebert	96%
Kevin Marsh	89%	Brett Gallant	98%
Colton Flasch	84%	Marc Kennedy	78%
Mike McEwen	76%	Brendan Bottcher	84%
Total	86%	Total	89%

=== Page 3/4 Qualifier ===
Friday, March 8, 7:00 pm

Sheet B	1	2	3	4	5	6	7	8	9	10	Final
Saskatchewan (McEwen) 🔨	1	1	1	1	1	0	1	1	X	X	7
Northwest Territories (J. Koe)	0	0	0	0	0	0	0	0	X	X	0

Player percentages
Saskatchewan		Northwest Territories	
Dan Marsh	89%	Shadrach McLeod	92%
Kevin Marsh	81%	Cole Parsons	76%
Colton Flasch	72%	Glen Kennedy	76%
Mike McEwen	94%	Jamie Koe	56%
Total	84%	Total	76%

Sheet D	1	2	3	4	5	6	7	8	9	10	Final
Manitoba (Carruthers) 🔨	0	0	0	0	0	0	2	0	0	X	2
Manitoba (Dunstone)	0	0	0	2	1	0	0	1	2	X	6

Player percentages
Manitoba (Carruthers)		Manitoba (Dunstone)	
Connor Njegovan	90%	Ryan Harnden	93%
Derek Samagalski	86%	Colton Lott	92%
Reid Carruthers	88%	B.J. Neufeld	96%
Brad Jacobs	76%	Matt Dunstone	90%
Total	85%	Total	93%

== Playoffs ==
Page playoff system
1	Alberta (Bottcher)	3
2	Canada	7
3	Saskatchewan	6
4	Manitoba (Dunstone)	5

Semifinal
1	Alberta (Bottcher)	3
3	Saskatchewan	7

Final
2	Canada	9
3	Saskatchewan	5

=== 1 vs. 2 ===
Saturday, March 9, 7:00 pm

Sheet C	1	2	3	4	5	6	7	8	9	10	Final
Alberta (Bottcher)	0	2	0	0	0	1	0	0	0	X	3
Canada (Gushue) 🔨	2	0	0	2	0	0	1	1	1	X	7

Player percentages
Alberta (Bottcher)		Canada	
Ben Hebert	97%	Geoff Walker	94%
Brett Gallant	90%	E.J. Harnden	92%
Marc Kennedy	83%	Mark Nichols	82%
Brendan Bottcher	78%	Brad Gushue	93%
Total	87%	Total	90%

=== 3 vs. 4 ===
Saturday, March 9, 1:00 pm

Sheet C	1	2	3	4	5	6	7	8	9	10	Final
Saskatchewan (McEwen) 🔨	2	0	0	1	1	1	0	0	0	1	6
Manitoba (Dunstone)	0	1	0	0	0	0	2	1	1	0	5

Player percentages
Saskatchewan		Manitoba (Dunstone)	
Dan Marsh	98%	Ryan Harnden	93%
Kevin Marsh	94%	Colton Lott	81%
Colton Flasch	86%	B.J. Neufeld	90%
Mike McEwen	94%	Matt Dunstone	81%
Total	93%	Total	86%

=== Semifinal ===
Sunday, March 10, 12:00 pm

Sheet C	1	2	3	4	5	6	7	8	9	10	Final
Alberta (Bottcher)	0	0	0	1	1	0	0	1	0	X	3
Saskatchewan (McEwen) 🔨	0	0	3	0	0	0	3	0	1	X	7

Player percentages
Alberta (Bottcher)		Saskatchewan	
Ben Hebert	97%	Dan Marsh	100%
Brett Gallant	82%	Kevin Marsh	97%
Marc Kennedy	96%	Colton Flasch	94%
Brendan Bottcher	88%	Mike McEwen	96%
Total	91%	Total	97%

=== Final ===
Sunday, March 10, 6:00 pm

Sheet C	1	2	3	4	5	6	7	8	9	10	Final
Canada (Gushue) 🔨	0	2	0	3	0	0	2	0	2	X	9
Saskatchewan (McEwen)	0	0	1	0	1	2	0	1	0	X	5

Player percentages
Canada		Saskatchewan	
Geoff Walker	89%	Dan Marsh	100%
E.J. Harnden	83%	Kevin Marsh	89%
Mark Nichols	94%	Colton Flasch	82%
Brad Gushue	97%	Mike McEwen	89%
Total	91%	Total	90%

== Statistics ==
=== Top 5 player percentages ===
Final Round Robin Percentages

Key
First All-Star Team
Second All-Star Team

Leads	%
(Alberta) (B) Ben Hebert	94
(Manitoba) (D) Ryan Harnden	94
(Canada) Geoff Walker	94
(British Columbia) Alex Horvath	91
(Manitoba) (C) Connor Njegovan	91

Seconds	%
(Alberta) (B) Brett Gallant	92
(Canada) E.J. Harnden	90
(Alberta) (S) Kerr Drummond	89
(Saskatchewan) Kevin Marsh	87
(Manitoba) (D) Colton Lott	87
(British Columbia) Sterling Middleton	87

Thirds	%
(Alberta) (B) Marc Kennedy	92
(Canada) Mark Nichols	89
(Ontario) David Mathers	87
(Manitoba) (D) B.J. Neufeld	86
(Saskatchewan) Colton Flasch	86
(Northern Ontario) Mike McCarville	86

Skips	%
(Saskatchewan) Mike McEwen	89
(Canada) Brad Gushue	88
(Manitoba) (D) Matt Dunstone	86
(Alberta) (B) Brendan Bottcher	85
(British Columbia) Catlin Schneider	84

=== Perfect games ===
Round robin only; minimum 10 shots thrown

Player	Team	Position	Shots	Opponent
Andy McCann	New Brunswick	Lead	16	Northern Ontario
Ben Hebert	Alberta (Bottcher)	Lead	18	Yukon
Ben Hebert	Alberta (Bottcher)	Lead	16	Ontario
Brett Gallant	Alberta (Bottcher)	Second	16	Ontario
Geoff Walker	Canada	Lead	16	Prince Edward Island
Brad Gushue	Canada	Skip	16	Prince Edward Island
Tim March	Ontario	Lead	22	Manitoba (Dunstone)
Ryan Harnden	Manitoba (Dunstone)	Lead	14	Newfoundland and Labrador
Stephen Trickett	Newfoundland and Labrador	Second	16	Manitoba (Dunstone)

== Awards ==
=== All-Star teams ===
The All-Star Teams were determined by a combination of media vote and playing percentages:

First Team
Position	Name	Team
Skip	Mike McEwen	Saskatchewan
Third	Marc Kennedy	Alberta (Bottcher)
Second	Brett Gallant	Alberta (Bottcher)
Lead	Ben Hebert	Alberta (Bottcher)

Second Team
Position	Name	Team
Skip	Brad Gushue	Canada
Third	Mark Nichols	Canada
Second	E.J. Harnden	Canada
Lead	Geoff Walker	Canada

=== Ross Harstone Sportsmanship Award ===
The Ross Harstone Sportsmanship Award is presented to the player chosen by their fellow peers as the curler who best represented Harstone's high ideals of good sportsmanship, observance of the rules, exemplary conduct and curling ability.

Name	Position	Team
Luke Saunders	Third	Nova Scotia

=== Hec Gervais Most Valuable Player Award ===
- Brad Gushue, skip, Team Canada

== Provincial and territorial playdowns ==
- 2024 Boston Pizza Cup (Alberta): February 6–11
- (British Columbia) 2024 BC Men's Curling Championship: January 23–28
- 2024 Viterra Championship (Manitoba): February 5–11
- 2024 New Brunswick Tankard: January 31 – February 3
- 2024 Newfoundland and Labrador Tankard: January 23–28
- 2024 Northern Ontario Men's Provincial Curling Championship: January 24–28
- 2024 Northwest Territories Men's Curling Championship: January 25–27
- 2024 Ocean Contractors Tankard (Nova Scotia): January 17–21
- 2024 Nunavut Brier Playdowns: December 14–17
- 2024 Ontario Tankard: January 24–28
- (Prince Edward Island) 2024 PEI Tankard: January 25–28
- 2024 Quebec Tankard: January 23–28
- 2024 SaskTel Tankard (Saskatchewan): January 31 – February 4
- 2024 Yukon Men's Curling Championship: January 11–14: Three teams competed; Dustin Mikkelsen, Tyler Williams and Thomas Scoffin. Scoffin won the event outright by going undefeated, finishing with a 4–0 record. Both Mikkelsen and Williams finished with 1–3 records.
