= Stephen Trickett =

Canadian curler

- Curler
- Born: January 19, 1995 (age 31); St. John's, Newfoundland and Labrador

Team
- Curling club: RE/MAX Centre, St. John's, NL
- Skip: Andrew Symonds
- Third: Trent Skanes
- Second: Stephen Trickett
- Lead: Keith Jewer

Curling career
- Member Association: Newfoundland and Labrador
- Brier: 1 (2024)

Stephen Trickett (born January 19, 1995) is a Canadian curler from St. John's, Newfoundland and Labrador. He currently competes in the World Curling Tour as a third for Team Symonds.

== Career ==
In 2017, Stephen Trickett participated in the U Sports/Curling Canada University Curling Championships with skip Adam Boland for the Memorial University of Newfoundland Seahawks. In this tournament, they would go 9–0 and claim the gold medal.

In 2024, Trickett would claim his first Montana's Brier berth with the Andrew Symonds rink when went 6–2 in the round robin and beat Greg Smith in the finals of the 2024 Newfoundland and Labrador Tankard. At the Brier, they would go 2–6 in the round robin and fail to qualify for the playoffs.

== Personal life ==
Trickett currently works as quality, safety, and compliance manager for Compass Group Canada. His sister, Erica Curtis is also a competitive curler.
