= Andrew Symonds (curler) =

Canadian curler

- Curler
- Born: July 6, 1974 (age 52); St. John's, Newfoundland and Labrador

Team
- Curling club: RE/MAX Centre, St. John's, NL
- Skip: Andrew Symonds
- Third: Trent Skanes
- Second: Chris Ford
- Lead: Keith Jewer

Curling career
- Member Association: Newfoundland and Labrador
- Brier: 3 (2011, 2019, 2024)
Medal record
Men's curling
Representing Newfoundland and Labrador
The Brier
Bronze medal – third place	2011 London
Canadian Curling Club Championships
Gold medal – first place	2015 Ottawa

Andrew Symonds (born July 6, 1974) is a Canadian curler from St. John's, Newfoundland and Labrador. He currently skips his own team on the World Curling Tour.

== Career ==
In 2011, Symonds competed in his first Brier curling championship as an alternate for the Brad Gushue rink in London, Ontario. They finished first in the round robin with a record of 9–2 before losing to Glenn Howard in the semi-finals to end the tournament with a third-place finish.

In 2015, the Symonds rink would compete in the 2015 Travelers Curling Club Championship as Team Newfoundland and Labrador after winning the Newfoundland and Labrador qualifier. In the round robin, Symonds would go an impressive 5-1 and finish on top of the leaderboard. This would automatically qualify them for the quarterfinals where they would defeat Stephane Lamy of Quebec by a score of 6-3. In the finals, Symonds would defeat Mike Benjamins of Manitoba 6-4 and go on to claim the first ever Canadian Curling Club Championships title for Newfoundland and Labrador.

In 2019, Symonds qualified for his first Brier as a skip by winning the 2019 Newfoundland and Labrador Tankard against the Rick Rowsell rink. At the Brier, the Symonds rink went winless with a final record of 0–7.

In 2024, Symonds appeared again at the Montana's Brier. He defeated the Greg Smith rink in the 2024 Newfoundland and Labrador Tankard to qualify. This qualification also made history as Symonds took lead Alex Smith to the Brier, who set the record for longest time in between Brier appearances. Symonds went 2–6 at the Brier.

== Personal life ==
Andrew Symonds is a sales executive for Nasdaq Verafin. He has three children. He started curling when he was 24 years old.
