= 2024 Stu Sells Oakville Tankard =

- Host city: Oakville, Ontario
- Arena: Oakville Curling Club
- Dates: September 6–9
- Men's winner: (Switzerland) Team Schwaller
- Curling club: CC Genève, Geneva
- Skip: Yannick Schwaller
- Fourth: Benoît Schwarz-van Berkel
- Second: Sven Michel
- Lead: Pablo Lachat
- Coach: Håvard Vad Petersson
- Finalist: (Germany) Marc Muskatewitz
- Women's winner: (Switzerland) Team Schwaller
- Curling club: GC Zurich, Zurich
- Skip: Xenia Schwaller
- Third: Selina Gafner
- Second: Fabienne Rieder
- Lead: Selina Rychiger
- Coach: Andreas Schwaller
- Finalist: (Alberta) Kayla Skrlik

The 2024 Stu Sells Oakville Tankard was held from September 6 to 9 at the Oakville Curling Club in Oakville, Ontario. The event was held in a triple knockout format with a purse of $30,000 on both the men's and women's sides. It was the first Stu Sells sponsored event held as part of the 2024–25 season.

In the men's event, Yannick Schwaller's Swiss rink from Geneva stole one in an extra end to beat Germany's Marc Muskatewitz 6–5. Schwaller, with fourth Benoît Schwarz-van Berkel, second Sven Michel and lead Pablo Lachat finished the event with a 7–2 record, qualifying for the playoff through the last chance C Event. Once qualified, the Swiss team knocked off the top two remaining seeds Bruce Mouat and Brad Gushue in the quarterfinals and semifinals respectively to reach the final. The German team, hailing from Füssen, also went 7–2 through the week, defeating Team Schwaller to qualify through the B side. In the playoffs, the team downed Korey Dropkin 9–2 in the quarterfinals and Marco Hösli 9–6 in the semifinals. Rounding out the playoff field was the Asian rinks of Riku Yanagisawa and Xu Xiaoming. Missing from the final eight was world number three ranked Ross Whyte who lost in a C qualifier.

In the women's final, Xenia Schwaller and her reigning world junior championship rink of Selina Gafner, Fabienne Rieder and Selina Rychiger stole three in the seventh end to defeat Kayla Skrlik 7–6. The Swiss team, that came into the event ranked eleventh in the world, qualified through the B side with a 3–1 record. They then shutout British Columbia's Kayla MacMillan 6–0 in the quarterfinals before defeating China's Wang Rui 5–3 in the semifinals. Alberta's Team Skrlik also qualified out of the B Event with a 4–1 record before playoff victories over Italy's Stefania Constantini and the United States' Delaney Strouse to reach the final. Rounding out the playoff bracket was A qualifiers Sayaka Yoshimura and Danielle Inglis who both lost in their respective quarterfinal matches. Of note, 2023 finalists Ha Seung-youn and Rebecca Morrison both competed in the event but did not reach the playoff round.

== Men ==
=== Teams ===
The teams are listed as follows:

Skip	Third	Second	Lead	Alternate	Locale
Daniel Casper	Luc Violette	Ben Richardson	Aidan Oldenburg		(United States) Chaska, Minnesota
Alex Champ	Kevin Flewwelling	Sean Harrison	Zander Elmes		Toronto, Ontario
Jordan Chandler	Landan Rooney	Connor Lawes	Robert Currie	Evan Lilly	Little Current, Ontario
James Craik	Mark Watt	Angus Bryce	Blair Haswell		Forfar, Scotland
Korey Dropkin	Andrew Stopera	Mark Fenner	Thomas Howell		(United States) Duluth, Minnesota
John Epping	Jacob Horgan	Tanner Horgan	Ian McMillan		Sudbury, Ontario
Fei Xueqing	Tian Yu	Li Zhichao	Ye Jianjun		Beijing, China
Pat Ferris	Connor Duhaime	Kurt Armstrong	Matt Pretty		Grimsby, Ontario
Wouter Gösgens	Laurens Hoekman	Jaap van Dorp	Tobias van den Hurk	Alexander Magan	Zoetermeer, Netherlands
Brad Gushue	Mark Nichols	E. J. Harnden	Geoff Walker		St. John's, Newfoundland and Labrador
Daniel Hocevar	Jacob Jones	Joel Matthews	Matthew Duizer		Toronto, Ontario
Philipp Hösli (Fourth)	Marco Hösli (Skip)	Simon Gloor	Justin Hausherr		Glarus, Switzerland
Mark Kean	Brady Lumley	Matthew Garner	Spencer Dunlop		Woodstock, Ontario
Jayden King	Dylan Niepage	Owen Henry	Daniel Del Conte		London, Ontario
Matthew Manuel	Cameron MacKenzie	Jeffrey Meagher	Nick Zachernuk		Halifax, Nova Scotia
Sam Mooibroek	Ryan Wiebe	Scott Mitchell	Nathan Steele		Whitby, Ontario
Bruce Mouat	Grant Hardie	Bobby Lammie	Hammy McMillan Jr.		Stirling, Scotland
Kibo Mulima	Wesley Forget	Wyatt Small	Austin Snyder		Waterloo, Ontario
Marc Muskatewitz	Benny Kapp	Felix Messenzehl	Johannes Scheuerl	Mario Trevisiol	Füssen, Germany
Owen Purcell	Luke Saunders	Scott Saccary	Ryan Abraham		Halifax, Nova Scotia
Scott Ray	Les Brownson	Shawn Ray	Will VanderMeulen		Tweed, Ontario
Benoît Schwarz-van Berkel (Fourth)	Yannick Schwaller (Skip)	Sven Michel	Pablo Lachat		Geneva, Switzerland
Greg Smith	Chris Ford	Zach Young	Zack Shurtleff	Carter Small	St. John's, Newfoundland and Labrador
Yves Stocker	Kim Schwaller	Felix Eberhard	Tom Winkelhausen		Zug, Switzerland
Kyle Waddell	Craig Waddell	Mark Taylor	Gavin Barr		Hamilton, Scotland
Ross Whyte	Robin Brydone	Duncan McFadzean	Euan Kyle		Stirling, Scotland
Xu Xiaoming	Zou Qiang	Wang Zhiyu	Guan Tianqi	Tian Jiafeng	Beijing, China
Riku Yanagisawa	Tsuyoshi Yamaguchi	Takeru Yamamoto	Satoshi Koizumi		Karuizawa, Japan

=== Knockout Brackets ===
==== A Event ====
First Knockout	Qualifier 1
(Scotland) Bruce Mouat	7
(Ontario) John Epping	6	(Ontario) John Epping	4
(Ontario) Jayden King	4	(Scotland) Bruce Mouat	6
(United States) Daniel Casper	7	(Switzerland) Marco Hösli	8
(China) Fei Xueqing	6	(United States) Daniel Casper	4
(Switzerland) Marco Hösli	6	(Switzerland) Marco Hösli	7
(Newfoundland and Labrador) Greg Smith	1	(Switzerland) Marco Hösli	6
(Scotland) James Craik	2
(Switzerland) Yannick Schwaller	4
(Ontario) Sam Mooibroek	8	(Ontario) Sam Mooibroek	6
(Nova Scotia) Matthew Manuel	4	(Ontario) Sam Mooibroek	3
(Scotland) James Craik	9	(Scotland) James Craik	7
(Ontario) Scott Ray	1	(Scotland) James Craik	5
(Netherlands) Wouter Gösgens	6	(Netherlands) Wouter Gösgens	2
(Ontario) Kibo Mulima	1

First Knockout	Qualifier 2
(Newfoundland and Labrador) Brad Gushue	7
(Nova Scotia) Owen Purcell	1	(Ontario) Mark Kean	1
(Ontario) Mark Kean	6	(Newfoundland and Labrador) Brad Gushue	6
(Scotland) Kyle Waddell	9	(Germany) Marc Muskatewitz	2
(Ontario) Daniel Hocevar	1	(Scotland) Kyle Waddell	4
(Germany) Marc Muskatewitz	7	(Germany) Marc Muskatewitz	9
(Ontario) Pat Ferris	0	(Newfoundland and Labrador) Brad Gushue	10
(Scotland) Ross Whyte	1
(Scotland) Ross Whyte	9
(Japan) Riku Yanagisawa	6	(Japan) Riku Yanagisawa	2
(Ontario) Alex Champ	1	(Scotland) Ross Whyte	8
(United States) Korey Dropkin	3	(China) Xu Xiaoming	2
(China) Xu Xiaoming	6	(China) Xu Xiaoming	7
(Switzerland) Yves Stocker	1	(Ontario) Jordan Chandler	5
(Ontario) Jordan Chandler	8

==== B Event ====
Second Knockout	To Qualifier 3
(Ontario) Jayden King	7
(Ontario) Mark Kean	4
(Ontario) Jayden King	1
(Scotland) Bruce Mouat	7
(Scotland) Bruce Mouat	8
(Scotland) Kyle Waddell	2
(Scotland) Kyle Waddell	7
(China) Fei Xueqing	7	(Newfoundland and Labrador) Greg Smith	4
(Newfoundland and Labrador) Greg Smith	8	(Scotland) Kyle Waddell	6	Qualifier 3
(Ontario) Sam Mooibroek	5
(Scotland) Bruce Mouat	5
(Scotland) Ross Whyte	2

Second Knockout	To Qualifier 3
(Nova Scotia) Matthew Manuel	5
(Japan) Riku Yanagisawa	4
(Nova Scotia) Matthew Manuel	6
(Ontario) Jordan Chandler	7
(Ontario) Jordan Chandler	7
(Ontario) Scott Ray	3	(Ontario) Kibo Mulima	6
(Ontario) Kibo Mulima	8	(Ontario) Jordan Chandler	3
(Scotland) Ross Whyte	4

Second Knockout	To Qualifier 4
(Nova Scotia) Owen Purcell	1
(Ontario) John Epping	3
(Ontario) John Epping	3
(Germany) Marc Muskatewitz	7
(Germany) Marc Muskatewitz	10
(China) Xu Xiaoming	2
(United States) Daniel Casper	5
(Ontario) Daniel Hocevar	8	(Ontario) Daniel Hocevar	6
(Ontario) Pat Ferris	5	(Ontario) Daniel Hocevar	7	Qualifier 4
(China) Xu Xiaoming	8
(Germany) Marc Muskatewitz	6
(Switzerland) Yannick Schwaller	4

Second Knockout	To Qualifier 4
(Ontario) Alex Champ	6
(Switzerland) Yannick Schwaller	7
(Switzerland) Yannick Schwaller	6
(United States) Korey Dropkin	0
(Netherlands) Wouter Gösgens	3
(United States) Korey Dropkin	8	(United States) Korey Dropkin	4
(Switzerland) Yves Stocker	3	(Switzerland) Yannick Schwaller	7
(Scotland) James Craik	5

==== C Event ====
Third Knockout	Qualifier 5
(Ontario) John Epping	5
(Ontario) Daniel Hocevar	3
(Ontario) John Epping	5
(United States) Korey Dropkin	7
(United States) Korey Dropkin	7
(Ontario) Pat Ferris	4	(Switzerland) Yves Stocker	3
(Switzerland) Yves Stocker	6	(United States) Korey Dropkin	7
(Scotland) Ross Whyte	4

Third Knockout	Qualifier 6
(Nova Scotia) Matthew Manuel	5
(China) Fei Xueqing	6	(China) Fei Xueqing	3
(Ontario) Scott Ray	1	(Nova Scotia) Matthew Manuel	5
(Ontario) Sam Mooibroek	6
(Ontario) Jayden King	2
(Ontario) Sam Mooibroek	9
(Ontario) Sam Mooibroek	3
(Switzerland) Yannick Schwaller	7

Third Knockout	Qualifier 7
(Japan) Riku Yanagisawa	7
(Ontario) Kibo Mulima	0	(Japan) Riku Yanagisawa	4
(Ontario) Jordan Chandler	2
(Japan) Riku Yanagisawa	6
(Ontario) Mark Kean	6	(Scotland) James Craik	5
(Newfoundland and Labrador) Greg Smith	3	(Ontario) Mark Kean	7
(Scotland) James Craik	10

Third Knockout	Qualifier 8
(Ontario) Alex Champ	4
(Netherlands) Wouter Gösgens	5	(Netherlands) Wouter Gösgens	6
(China) Xu Xiaoming	7
(China) Xu Xiaoming	7
(Nova Scotia) Owen Purcell	4	(United States) Daniel Casper	4
(United States) Daniel Casper	8	(United States) Daniel Casper	5
(Scotland) Kyle Waddell	4

=== Knockout Results ===
All draw times are listed in Eastern Time (UTC−04:00).

==== Draw 1 ====
Friday, September 6, 9:00 am

Sheet 1	1	2	3	4	5	6	7	8	Final
(Netherlands) Wouter Gösgens 🔨	0	1	0	1	0	2	2	X	6
(Ontario) Kibo Mulima	0	0	1	0	0	0	0	X	1

Sheet 2	1	2	3	4	5	6	7	8	Final
(Ontario) John Epping 🔨	0	2	0	1	2	0	1	X	6
(Ontario) Jayden King	0	0	2	0	0	2	0	X	4

Sheet 3	1	2	3	4	5	6	7	8	Final
(Scotland) Kyle Waddell 🔨	3	0	3	2	1	X	X	X	9
(Ontario) Daniel Hocevar	0	1	0	0	0	X	X	X	1

Sheet 4	1	2	3	4	5	6	7	8	Final
(United States) Daniel Casper	0	2	0	1	0	3	0	1	7
(China) Fei Xueqing 🔨	2	0	0	0	1	0	3	0	6

Sheet 5	1	2	3	4	5	6	7	8	Final
(Scotland) James Craik 🔨	3	0	3	0	2	1	X	X	9
(Ontario) Scott Ray	0	1	0	0	0	0	X	X	1

Sheet 6	1	2	3	4	5	6	7	8	Final
(Switzerland) Marco Hösli 🔨	0	3	2	0	0	1	X	X	6
(Newfoundland and Labrador) Greg Smith	0	0	0	0	1	0	X	X	1

Sheet 7	1	2	3	4	5	6	7	8	Final
(Japan) Riku Yanagisawa 🔨	2	0	0	0	3	1	X	X	6
(Ontario) Alex Champ	0	0	0	1	0	0	X	X	1

Sheet 8	1	2	3	4	5	6	7	8	Final
(Ontario) Sam Mooibroek	0	2	0	0	2	1	3	X	8
(Nova Scotia) Matthew Manuel 🔨	1	0	2	1	0	0	0	X	4

==== Draw 2 ====
Friday, September 6, 1:00 pm

Sheet 1	1	2	3	4	5	6	7	8	Final
(Nova Scotia) Owen Purcell	0	0	1	0	0	0	0	X	1
(Ontario) Mark Kean 🔨	1	0	0	1	1	1	2	X	6

Sheet 3	1	2	3	4	5	6	7	8	Final
(Switzerland) Yves Stocker 🔨	1	0	0	0	0	X	X	X	1
(Ontario) Jordan Chandler	0	2	1	1	4	X	X	X	8

Sheet 4	1	2	3	4	5	6	7	8	Final
(United States) Korey Dropkin	0	1	0	1	0	1	0	X	3
(China) Xu Xiaoming 🔨	2	0	2	0	2	0	0	X	6

Sheet 7	1	2	3	4	5	6	7	8	Final
(Germany) Marc Muskatewitz	2	2	1	2	X	X	X	X	7
(Ontario) Pat Ferris 🔨	0	0	0	0	X	X	X	X	0

==== Draw 4 ====
Friday, September 6, 6:45 pm

Sheet 1	1	2	3	4	5	6	7	8	Final
(United States) Daniel Casper	0	1	0	2	0	1	0	X	4
(Switzerland) Marco Hösli 🔨	0	0	2	0	5	0	0	X	7

Sheet 2	1	2	3	4	5	6	7	8	Final
(Scotland) Kyle Waddell 🔨	0	2	1	1	0	0	0	X	4
(Germany) Marc Muskatewitz	2	0	0	0	2	3	2	X	9

Sheet 3	1	2	3	4	5	6	7	8	Final
(Scotland) Bruce Mouat	0	1	0	0	2	0	0	4	7
(Ontario) John Epping 🔨	1	0	1	1	0	1	0	0	4

Sheet 4	1	2	3	4	5	6	7	8	Final
(Switzerland) Yannick Schwaller	0	1	0	1	0	0	2	0	4
(Ontario) Sam Mooibroek 🔨	1	0	1	0	2	1	0	1	6

Sheet 5	1	2	3	4	5	6	7	8	Final
(Newfoundland and Labrador) Brad Gushue	2	1	0	1	3	X	X	X	7
(Ontario) Mark Kean 🔨	0	0	1	0	0	X	X	X	1

Sheet 6	1	2	3	4	5	6	7	8	Final
(Scotland) Ross Whyte	0	4	0	3	2	X	X	X	9
(Japan) Riku Yanagisawa 🔨	1	0	1	0	0	X	X	X	2

Sheet 7	1	2	3	4	5	6	7	8	Final
(China) Xu Xiaoming 🔨	0	2	0	3	0	1	0	1	7
(Ontario) Jordan Chandler	2	0	1	0	1	0	1	0	5

Sheet 8	1	2	3	4	5	6	7	8	Final
(Scotland) James Craik	0	0	0	0	1	4	0	X	5
(Netherlands) Wouter Gösgens 🔨	0	1	0	0	0	0	1	X	2

==== Draw 5 ====
Friday, September 6, 9:15 pm

Sheet 1	1	2	3	4	5	6	7	8	Final
(China) Fei Xueqing	0	2	0	2	0	2	0	1	7
(Newfoundland and Labrador) Greg Smith 🔨	2	0	3	0	2	0	1	0	8

Sheet 2	1	2	3	4	5	6	7	8	Final
(Ontario) Scott Ray	1	0	1	0	0	1	0	X	3
(Ontario) Kibo Mulima 🔨	0	2	0	0	3	0	3	X	8

Sheet 7	1	2	3	4	5	6	7	8	Final
(United States) Korey Dropkin	0	0	2	4	0	2	X	X	8
(Switzerland) Yves Stocker 🔨	1	0	0	0	2	0	X	X	3

Sheet 8	1	2	3	4	5	6	7	8	Final
(Ontario) Daniel Hocevar	1	0	2	0	3	0	2	X	8
(Ontario) Pat Ferris 🔨	0	2	0	2	0	1	0	X	5

==== Draw 6 ====
Saturday, September 7, 8:00 am

Sheet 1	1	2	3	4	5	6	7	8	9	Final
(Ontario) Alex Champ 🔨	1	0	1	0	2	1	0	1	0	6
(Switzerland) Yannick Schwaller	0	2	0	2	0	0	2	0	1	7

Sheet 2	1	2	3	4	5	6	7	8	9	Final
(United States) Daniel Casper	1	0	0	0	1	0	2	1	0	5
(Ontario) Daniel Hocevar 🔨	0	1	1	1	0	2	0	0	1	6

Sheet 3	1	2	3	4	5	6	7	8	Final
(Nova Scotia) Matthew Manuel	0	0	0	2	1	1	0	1	5
(Japan) Riku Yanagisawa 🔨	0	0	2	0	0	0	2	0	4

Sheet 4	1	2	3	4	5	6	7	8	Final
(Netherlands) Wouter Gösgens	0	0	1	0	1	0	1	0	3
(United States) Korey Dropkin 🔨	0	1	0	1	0	1	0	1	4

Sheet 5	1	2	3	4	5	6	7	8	Final
(Scotland) Kyle Waddell	0	2	2	0	2	0	1	X	7
(Newfoundland and Labrador) Greg Smith 🔨	1	0	0	2	0	1	0	X	4

Sheet 6	1	2	3	4	5	6	7	8	9	Final
(Ontario) Jordan Chandler	0	1	2	0	0	1	0	2	1	7
(Ontario) Kibo Mulima 🔨	2	0	0	2	0	0	2	0	0	6

Sheet 7	1	2	3	4	5	6	7	8	Final
(Ontario) Jayden King 🔨	2	0	2	0	3	0	0	X	7
(Ontario) Mark Kean	0	2	0	0	0	0	2	X	4

Sheet 8	1	2	3	4	5	6	7	8	Final
(Nova Scotia) Owen Purcell	0	0	0	0	0	1	0	X	1
(Ontario) John Epping 🔨	0	0	2	0	0	0	1	X	3

==== Draw 8 ====
Saturday, September 7, 2:15 pm

Sheet 1	1	2	3	4	5	6	7	8	Final
(Ontario) Pat Ferris 🔨	1	0	1	0	0	2	0	0	4
(Switzerland) Yves Stocker	0	3	0	0	1	0	0	2	6

Sheet 3	1	2	3	4	5	6	7	8	Final
(Scotland) Ross Whyte 🔨	2	0	4	0	2	X	X	X	8
(China) Xu Xiaoming	0	1	0	1	0	X	X	X	2

Sheet 4	1	2	3	4	5	6	7	8	Final
(Newfoundland and Labrador) Brad Gushue	1	1	0	1	0	0	1	2	6
(Germany) Marc Muskatewitz 🔨	0	0	2	0	0	0	0	0	2

Sheet 5	1	2	3	4	5	6	7	8	Final
(Scotland) Bruce Mouat	1	0	0	2	0	2	1	0	6
(Switzerland) Marco Hösli 🔨	0	2	1	0	2	0	0	3	8

Sheet 6	1	2	3	4	5	6	7	8	Final
(Ontario) Sam Mooibroek 🔨	0	2	0	0	1	0	X	X	3
(Scotland) James Craik	2	0	2	1	0	2	X	X	7

Sheet 8	1	2	3	4	5	6	7	8	Final
(China) Fei Xueqing 🔨	0	2	1	3	0	X	X	X	6
(Ontario) Scott Ray	0	0	0	0	1	X	X	X	1

==== Draw 9 ====
Saturday, September 7, 4:45 pm

Sheet 6	1	2	3	4	5	6	7	8	Final
(Switzerland) Yannick Schwaller 🔨	3	0	0	1	2	X	X	X	6
(United States) Korey Dropkin	0	0	0	0	0	X	X	X	0

==== Draw 10 ====
Saturday, September 7, 8:00 pm

Sheet 1	1	2	3	4	5	6	7	8	9	Final
(Scotland) Kyle Waddell	0	1	0	1	1	0	2	0	1	6
(Ontario) Sam Mooibroek 🔨	1	0	1	0	0	1	0	2	0	5

Sheet 2	1	2	3	4	5	6	7	8	Final
(Switzerland) Marco Hösli 🔨	0	0	1	0	1	0	4	X	6
(Scotland) James Craik	0	0	0	0	0	2	0	X	2

Sheet 3	1	2	3	4	5	6	7	8	Final
(Nova Scotia) Matthew Manuel	2	2	0	0	1	0	1	0	6
(Ontario) Jordan Chandler 🔨	0	0	1	1	0	3	0	2	7

Sheet 4	1	2	3	4	5	6	7	8	Final
(Ontario) Jayden King	0	0	0	1	0	X	X	X	1
(Scotland) Bruce Mouat 🔨	1	1	3	0	2	X	X	X	7

Sheet 5	1	2	3	4	5	6	7	8	Final
(Ontario) Daniel Hocevar 🔨	2	1	0	1	0	0	3	0	7
(China) Xu Xiaoming	0	0	1	0	2	3	0	2	8

Sheet 6	1	2	3	4	5	6	7	8	Final
(Ontario) John Epping 🔨	1	0	2	0	0	0	0	X	3
(Germany) Marc Muskatewitz	0	1	0	2	1	2	1	X	7

Sheet 7	1	2	3	4	5	6	7	8	Final
(Newfoundland and Labrador) Brad Gushue 🔨	3	0	3	4	X	X	X	X	10
(Scotland) Ross Whyte	0	1	0	0	X	X	X	X	1

==== Draw 12 ====
Sunday, September 8, 9:00 am

Sheet 1	1	2	3	4	5	6	7	8	Final
(Ontario) John Epping	0	1	0	0	2	0	2	X	5
(Ontario) Daniel Hocevar 🔨	1	0	1	0	0	1	0	X	3

Sheet 2	1	2	3	4	5	6	7	8	Final
(United States) Korey Dropkin 🔨	1	0	2	0	3	0	1	X	7
(Switzerland) Yves Stocker	0	1	0	1	0	1	0	X	3

Sheet 3	1	2	3	4	5	6	7	8	Final
(Ontario) Alex Champ	0	0	0	1	2	0	0	1	4
(Netherlands) Wouter Gösgens 🔨	0	2	0	0	0	1	2	0	5

Sheet 4	1	2	3	4	5	6	7	8	Final
(Japan) Riku Yanagisawa 🔨	0	2	2	2	1	X	X	X	7
(Ontario) Kibo Mulima	0	0	0	0	0	X	X	X	0

Sheet 5	1	2	3	4	5	6	7	8	Final
(Nova Scotia) Matthew Manuel 🔨	1	0	2	0	0	1	1	X	5
(China) Fei Xueqing	0	1	0	2	0	0	0	X	3

Sheet 6	1	2	3	4	5	6	7	8	Final
(Ontario) Jayden King	0	1	0	1	0	X	X	X	2
(Ontario) Sam Mooibroek 🔨	5	0	1	0	3	X	X	X	9

Sheet 7	1	2	3	4	5	6	7	8	Final
(Nova Scotia) Owen Purcell	0	0	3	0	0	1	0	0	4
(United States) Daniel Casper 🔨	2	0	0	1	1	0	3	1	8

Sheet 8	1	2	3	4	5	6	7	8	Final
(Ontario) Mark Kean 🔨	0	0	2	1	0	2	1	X	6
(Newfoundland and Labrador) Greg Smith	1	1	0	0	1	0	0	X	3

==== Draw 14 ====
Sunday, September 8, 3:30 pm

Sheet 1	1	2	3	4	5	6	7	8	Final
(Germany) Marc Muskatewitz 🔨	2	5	0	0	3	X	X	X	10
(China) Xu Xiaoming	0	0	1	1	0	X	X	X	2

Sheet 2	1	2	3	4	5	6	7	8	Final
(Nova Scotia) Matthew Manuel 🔨	0	2	0	1	0	2	0	0	5
(Ontario) Sam Mooibroek	1	0	2	0	2	0	0	1	6

Sheet 3	1	2	3	4	5	6	7	8	Final
(Switzerland) Yannick Schwaller 🔨	1	0	2	0	2	0	1	1	7
(Scotland) James Craik	0	1	0	2	0	2	0	0	5

Sheet 4	1	2	3	4	5	6	7	8	Final
(Ontario) Jordan Chandler	0	1	0	1	0	1	0	X	3
(Scotland) Ross Whyte 🔨	1	0	3	0	0	0	0	X	4

Sheet 5	1	2	3	4	5	6	7	8	Final
(Ontario) John Epping	2	0	0	1	0	2	0	0	5
(United States) Korey Dropkin 🔨	0	2	0	0	2	0	2	1	7

Sheet 6	1	2	3	4	5	6	7	8	Final
(Scotland) Bruce Mouat 🔨	1	0	3	0	4	X	X	X	8
(Scotland) Kyle Waddell	0	1	0	1	0	X	X	X	2

==== Draw 15 ====
Sunday, September 8, 6:45 pm

Sheet 2	1	2	3	4	5	6	7	8	Final
(Scotland) Bruce Mouat 🔨	1	1	0	1	0	2	0	X	5
(Scotland) Ross Whyte	0	0	1	0	1	0	0	X	2

Sheet 3	1	2	3	4	5	6	7	8	Final
(United States) Daniel Casper	0	1	0	1	0	2	0	1	5
(Scotland) Kyle Waddell 🔨	0	0	1	0	1	0	2	0	4

Sheet 4	1	2	3	4	5	6	7	8	Final
(Ontario) Mark Kean	0	1	1	0	2	0	3	0	7
(Scotland) James Craik 🔨	2	0	0	4	0	1	0	3	10

Sheet 5	1	2	3	4	5	6	7	8	Final
(Japan) Riku Yanagisawa	1	0	0	2	0	1	0	X	4
(Ontario) Jordan Chandler 🔨	0	1	0	0	1	0	0	X	2

Sheet 6	1	2	3	4	5	6	7	8	Final
(Netherlands) Wouter Gösgens 🔨	1	0	2	0	1	0	2	0	6
(China) Xu Xiaoming	0	1	0	1	0	2	0	3	7

Sheet 7	1	2	3	4	5	6	7	8	Final
(Germany) Marc Muskatewitz	0	2	0	0	2	0	1	1	6
(Switzerland) Yannick Schwaller 🔨	0	0	1	1	0	2	0	0	4

==== Draw 16 ====
Sunday, September 8, 9:15 pm

Sheet 2	1	2	3	4	5	6	7	8	Final
(Japan) Riku Yanagisawa 🔨	1	0	2	0	0	2	0	1	6
(Scotland) James Craik	0	2	0	2	0	0	1	0	5

Sheet 3	1	2	3	4	5	6	7	8	Final
(United States) Korey Dropkin	2	0	0	0	2	0	2	1	7
(Scotland) Ross Whyte 🔨	0	2	0	0	0	2	0	0	4

Sheet 4	1	2	3	4	5	6	7	8	Final
(China) Xu Xiaoming	0	0	2	1	1	1	0	2	7
(United States) Daniel Casper 🔨	2	1	0	0	0	0	1	0	4

Sheet 5	1	2	3	4	5	6	7	8	Final
(Ontario) Sam Mooibroek	0	1	0	1	0	1	0	0	3
(Switzerland) Yannick Schwaller 🔨	0	0	2	0	0	0	2	3	7

=== Playoffs ===
Quarterfinals
1	(Switzerland) Marco Hösli	4
8	(China) Xu Xiaoming	3
4	(Germany) Marc Muskatewitz	9
5	(United States) Korey Dropkin	2
3	(Scotland) Bruce Mouat	8
6	(Switzerland) Yannick Schwaller	9
2	(Newfoundland and Labrador) Brad Gushue	10
7	(Japan) Riku Yanagisawa	0

Semifinals
1	(Switzerland) Marco Hösli	6
4	(Germany) Marc Muskatewitz	9
6	(Switzerland) Yannick Schwaller	7
2	(Newfoundland and Labrador) Brad Gushue	5

Final
4	(Germany) Marc Muskatewitz	5
6	(Switzerland) Yannick Schwaller	6

==== Quarterfinals ====
Monday, September 9, 8:30 am

Sheet 5	1	2	3	4	5	6	7	8	Final
(Newfoundland and Labrador) Brad Gushue 🔨	2	2	2	4	X	X	X	X	10
(Japan) Riku Yanagisawa	0	0	0	0	X	X	X	X	0

Sheet 6	1	2	3	4	5	6	7	8	Final
(Scotland) Bruce Mouat 🔨	0	3	0	0	2	0	2	1	8
(Switzerland) Yannick Schwaller	1	0	2	2	0	4	0	0	9

Sheet 7	1	2	3	4	5	6	7	8	Final
(Switzerland) Marco Hösli 🔨	0	2	1	0	0	1	0	0	4
(China) Xu Xiaoming	0	0	0	1	1	0	1	0	3

Sheet 8	1	2	3	4	5	6	7	8	Final
(Germany) Marc Muskatewitz 🔨	2	0	0	0	2	0	5	X	9
(United States) Korey Dropkin	0	0	0	1	0	1	0	X	2

==== Semifinals ====
Monday, September 9, 12:00 pm

Sheet 2	1	2	3	4	5	6	7	8	Final
(Switzerland) Yannick Schwaller	1	0	0	2	0	1	0	3	7
(Newfoundland and Labrador) Brad Gushue 🔨	0	2	1	0	1	0	1	0	5

Sheet 4	1	2	3	4	5	6	7	8	Final
(Switzerland) Marco Hösli 🔨	0	0	3	0	3	0	0	0	6
(Germany) Marc Muskatewitz	1	1	0	5	0	0	1	1	9

==== Final ====
Monday, September 9, 3:15 pm

Sheet 6	1	2	3	4	5	6	7	8	9	Final
(Germany) Marc Muskatewitz 🔨	2	0	1	0	0	1	1	0	0	5
(Switzerland) Yannick Schwaller	0	2	0	1	1	0	0	1	1	6

== Women ==
=== Teams ===
The teams are listed as follows:

Skip	Third	Second	Lead	Alternate	Locale
Emma Artichuk	Megan Smith	Jamie Smith	Lauren Rajala	Scotia Maltman	Sudbury, Ontario
Krysta Burns	Jestyn Murphy	Sara Guy	Laura Masters		Sudbury, Ontario
Stefania Constantini	Elena Mathis	Angela Romei	Giulia Zardini Lacedelli	Marta Lo Deserto	Cortina d'Ampezzo, Italy
Jessica Corrado	Kristina Brauch	Kaitlin Jewer	Jessica Byers	Karen Rowsell	Lakefield, Ontario
Elizabeth Cousins	Annmarie Dubberstein	Allison Howell	Elizabeth Janiak		(United States) Nashua, New Hampshire
Hollie Duncan	Megan Balsdon	Rachelle Strybosch	Kelly Middaugh (Note: Kelly Middaugh spared for Tess Guyatt.)		Woodstock, Ontario
Katie Ford	Emily Middaugh	Madison Fisher	Tori Zemmelink		Guelph, Ontario
Ha Seung-youn	Kim Hye-rin	Yang Tae-i	Kim Su-jin	Park Seo-jin	Chuncheon, South Korea
Fay Henderson	Robyn Munro	Hailey Duff	Katie McMillan	Lisa Davie	Stirling, Scotland
Corrie Hürlimann	Celine Schwizgebel	Sarah Müller	Marina Lörtscher	Stefanie Berset	Zug, Switzerland
Danielle Inglis	Kira Brunton	Calissa Daly	Cassandra de Groot		Ottawa, Ontario
Isabelle Ladouceur	Grace Lloyd	Michaela Robert	Rachel Steele		Whitby, Ontario
Kayla MacMillan	Sarah Daniels	Lindsay Dubue	Sarah Loken		Victoria, British Columbia
Lauren Mann	Laura Forget	Candice Jackson	Stephanie Barbeau		North Bay, Ontario
Rebecca Morrison (Fourth)	Jennifer Dodds	Sophie Sinclair	Sophie Jackson (Skip) (Note: Sophie Jackson skipped Team Morrison.)		Stirling, Scotland
Breanna Rozon	Chrissy Cadorin	Stephanie Thompson	Jillian Page	Leigh Armstrong	Oshawa, Ontario
Xenia Schwaller	Selina Gafner	Fabienne Rieder	Selina Rychiger		Zurich, Switzerland
Kayla Skrlik	Margot Flemming	Ashton Skrlik	Geri-Lynn Ramsay		Calgary, Alberta
Laurie St-Georges	Jamie Sinclair	Emily Riley	Lisa Weagle		Montreal, Quebec
Delaney Strouse	Sarah Anderson	Sydney Mullaney	Anne O'Hara		(United States) Traverse City, Michigan
Wang Rui	Han Yu	Dong Ziqi	Jiang Jiayi	Su Tingyu	Beijing, China
Kristy Watling	Laura Burtnyk	Emily Deschenes	Sarah Pyke		Winnipeg, Manitoba
Sayaka Yoshimura	Yuna Kotani	Kaho Onodera	Anna Ohmiya	Mina Kobayashi	Sapporo, Japan
Zhang Yujie	Yang Ying	Liu Min	Zhang Yuning	Yu Xiaohan	Beijing, China

=== Knockout Brackets ===
==== A Event ====
First Knockout				Qualifier 1
(Italy) Stefania Constantini	12
(China) Zhang Yujie	3	(Italy) Stefania Constantini	6
(Manitoba) Kristy Watling	6	(Scotland) Fay Henderson	4
(Scotland) Fay Henderson	7			(Italy) Stefania Constantini	4
(South Korea) Ha Seung-youn	11			(Japan) Sayaka Yoshimura	9
(Ontario) Lauren Mann	2	(South Korea) Ha Seung-youn	5
(Japan) Sayaka Yoshimura	13	(Japan) Sayaka Yoshimura	8
(Ontario) Krysta Burns	3

First Knockout				Qualifier 2
(Switzerland) Xenia Schwaller	7
(Ontario) Jessica Corrado	2	(Switzerland) Xenia Schwaller	5
(Quebec) Laurie St-Georges	5	(Quebec) Laurie St-Georges	3
(Ontario) Isabelle Ladouceur	3			(Switzerland) Xenia Schwaller	0
(Alberta) Kayla Skrlik	4			(Ontario) Danielle Inglis	7
(Ontario) Emma Artichuk	1	(Alberta) Kayla Skrlik	3
(Ontario) Danielle Inglis	7	(Ontario) Danielle Inglis	7
(United States) Elizabeth Cousins	5

First Knockout				Qualifier 3
(Scotland) Team Morrison	9
(Ontario) Breanna Rozon	3	(Scotland) Team Morrison	2
(Switzerland) Corrie Hürlimann	0	(China) Wang Rui	8
(China) Wang Rui	8			(China) Wang Rui	4
(British Columbia) Kayla MacMillan	9			(British Columbia) Kayla MacMillan	8
(Ontario) Hollie Duncan	6	(British Columbia) Kayla MacMillan	4
(United States) Delaney Strouse	8	(United States) Delaney Strouse	3
(Ontario) Katie Ford	3

==== B Event ====
Second Knockout	Qualifier 4
(Quebec) Laurie St-Georges	5
(China) Zhang Yujie	6	(Manitoba) Kristy Watling	8
(Manitoba) Kristy Watling	7	(Manitoba) Kristy Watling	2
(Alberta) Kayla Skrlik	8
(Alberta) Kayla Skrlik	7
(Ontario) Lauren Mann	4	(Ontario) Krysta Burns	3
(Ontario) Krysta Burns	5	(Alberta) Kayla Skrlik	7
(China) Wang Rui	6

Second Knockout	Qualifier 5
(Scotland) Team Morrison	5
(Ontario) Jessica Corrado	2	(Ontario) Isabelle Ladouceur	2
(Ontario) Isabelle Ladouceur	8	(Scotland) Team Morrison	8
(United States) Delaney Strouse	4
(United States) Delaney Strouse	5
(Ontario) Emma Artichuk	5	(Ontario) Emma Artichuk	4
(United States) Elizabeth Cousins	4	(Scotland) Team Morrison	3
(Italy) Stefania Constantini	5

Second Knockout	Qualifier 6
(Scotland) Fay Henderson	4
(Ontario) Breanna Rozon	8	(Ontario) Breanna Rozon	6
(Switzerland) Corrie Hürlimann	7	(Ontario) Breanna Rozon	5
(South Korea) Ha Seung-youn	4
(South Korea) Ha Seung-youn	8
(Ontario) Hollie Duncan	6	(Ontario) Hollie Duncan	3
(Ontario) Katie Ford	2	(Ontario) Breanna Rozon	3
(Switzerland) Xenia Schwaller	7

==== C Event ====
Third Knockout	Qualifier 7
(Scotland) Team Morrison	5
(Scotland) Fay Henderson	6
(Scotland) Fay Henderson	8
(China) Zhang Yujie	3	(Ontario) Lauren Mann	3
(Ontario) Lauren Mann	8	(Scotland) Fay Henderson	4
(China) Wang Rui	6
(China) Wang Rui	8
(United States) Elizabeth Cousins	2
(Ontario) Hollie Duncan	2
(Ontario) Jessica Corrado	6	(United States) Elizabeth Cousins	7
(United States) Elizabeth Cousins	7

Third Knockout	Qualifier 8
(Switzerland) Corrie Hürlimann	6
(Ontario) Katie Ford	3	(Switzerland) Corrie Hürlimann	6
(Manitoba) Kristy Watling	8
(Manitoba) Kristy Watling	5
(Ontario) Isabelle Ladouceur	6	(Ontario) Isabelle Ladouceur	7
(Ontario) Emma Artichuk	1	(Ontario) Isabelle Ladouceur	6
(South Korea) Ha Seung-youn	4
(Ontario) Isabelle Ladouceur	7
(United States) Delaney Strouse	8
(United States) Delaney Strouse	7
(Quebec) Laurie St-Georges	9	(Quebec) Laurie St-Georges	4
(Ontario) Krysta Burns	2	(United States) Delaney Strouse	5
(Ontario) Breanna Rozon	3

=== Knockout Results ===
All draw times are listed in Eastern Time (UTC−04:00).

==== Draw 2 ====
Friday, September 6, 1:00 pm

Sheet 2	1	2	3	4	5	6	7	8	Final
(South Korea) Ha Seung-youn 🔨	2	0	1	0	1	2	5	X	11
(Ontario) Lauren Mann	0	1	0	1	0	0	0	X	2

Sheet 5	1	2	3	4	5	6	7	8	Final
(Italy) Stefania Constantini 🔨	3	0	0	0	2	3	4	X	12
(China) Zhang Yujie	0	1	1	1	0	0	0	X	3

Sheet 6	1	2	3	4	5	6	7	8	Final
(Japan) Sayaka Yoshimura 🔨	0	4	0	0	3	3	3	X	13
(Ontario) Krysta Burns	1	0	2	0	0	0	0	X	3

Sheet 8	1	2	3	4	5	6	7	8	9	Final
(Manitoba) Kristy Watling	3	0	1	2	0	0	0	0	0	6
(Scotland) Fay Henderson 🔨	0	2	0	0	1	1	1	1	1	7

==== Draw 3 ====
Friday, September 6, 3:30 pm

Sheet 1	1	2	3	4	5	6	7	8	Final
(Quebec) Laurie St-Georges	0	0	2	1	0	1	1	X	5
(Ontario) Isabelle Ladouceur 🔨	0	1	0	0	2	0	0	X	3

Sheet 2	1	2	3	4	5	6	7	8	Final
(Alberta) Kayla Skrlik 🔨	0	0	1	0	1	1	1	X	4
(Ontario) Emma Artichuk	0	0	0	1	0	0	0	X	1

Sheet 3	1	2	3	4	5	6	7	8	Final
(United States) Delaney Strouse	0	1	0	2	1	4	X	X	8
(Ontario) Katie Ford 🔨	2	0	1	0	0	0	X	X	3

Sheet 4	1	2	3	4	5	6	7	8	Final
(Scotland) Team Morrison	0	0	2	0	2	0	2	3	9
(Ontario) Breanna Rozon 🔨	1	0	0	1	0	1	0	0	3

Sheet 5	1	2	3	4	5	6	7	8	Final
(Switzerland) Xenia Schwaller	1	0	1	2	0	1	2	X	7
(Ontario) Jessica Corrado 🔨	0	1	0	0	1	0	0	X	2

Sheet 6	1	2	3	4	5	6	7	8	Final
(Ontario) Danielle Inglis	1	0	0	3	0	3	0	X	7
(United States) Elizabeth Cousins 🔨	0	1	0	0	2	0	2	X	5

Sheet 7	1	2	3	4	5	6	7	8	Final
(British Columbia) Kayla MacMillan	3	0	0	2	2	0	2	X	9
(Ontario) Hollie Duncan 🔨	0	0	4	0	0	2	0	X	6

Sheet 8	1	2	3	4	5	6	7	8	Final
(Switzerland) Corrie Hürlimann	0	0	0	0	0	X	X	X	0
(China) Wang Rui 🔨	1	2	1	1	3	X	X	X	8

==== Draw 5 ====
Friday, September 6, 9:15 pm

Sheet 3	1	2	3	4	5	6	7	8	Final
(Italy) Stefania Constantini 🔨	1	0	3	0	0	0	2	0	6
(Scotland) Fay Henderson	0	1	0	0	1	2	0	0	4

Sheet 4	1	2	3	4	5	6	7	8	Final
(South Korea) Ha Seung-youn	0	1	0	1	0	0	3	0	5
(Japan) Sayaka Yoshimura 🔨	4	0	1	0	1	1	0	1	8

Sheet 5	1	2	3	4	5	6	7	8	Final
(Alberta) Kayla Skrlik	1	0	2	0	0	0	0	X	3
(Ontario) Danielle Inglis 🔨	0	1	0	1	1	1	3	X	7

Sheet 6	1	2	3	4	5	6	7	8	Final
(Switzerland) Xenia Schwaller 🔨	0	0	0	3	1	1	0	X	5
(Quebec) Laurie St-Georges	1	0	0	0	0	0	2	X	3

==== Draw 7 ====
Saturday, September 7, 10:45 am

Sheet 1	1	2	3	4	5	6	7	8	Final
(Ontario) Lauren Mann 🔨	0	1	0	1	0	2	0	0	4
(Ontario) Krysta Burns	2	0	1	0	1	0	0	1	5

Sheet 2	1	2	3	4	5	6	7	8	Final
(China) Zhang Yujie 🔨	0	1	0	1	1	1	2	0	6
(Manitoba) Kristy Watling	4	0	1	0	0	0	0	2	7

Sheet 3	1	2	3	4	5	6	7	8	9	Final
(Ontario) Breanna Rozon 🔨	2	0	0	1	2	0	0	2	1	8
(Switzerland) Corrie Hürlimann	0	2	2	0	0	2	1	0	0	7

Sheet 4	1	2	3	4	5	6	7	8	Final
(Ontario) Hollie Duncan	0	0	0	1	0	3	2	X	6
(Ontario) Katie Ford 🔨	0	0	1	0	1	0	0	X	2

Sheet 5	1	2	3	4	5	6	7	8	Final
(Scotland) Team Morrison 🔨	0	0	0	0	2	0	X	X	2
(China) Wang Rui	0	1	2	3	0	2	X	X	8

Sheet 6	1	2	3	4	5	6	7	8	9	Final
(British Columbia) Kayla MacMillan	1	0	0	0	1	1	0	0	1	4
(United States) Delaney Strouse 🔨	0	0	1	1	0	0	0	1	0	3

Sheet 7	1	2	3	4	5	6	7	8	Final
(Ontario) Jessica Corrado	0	0	1	0	1	0	X	X	2
(Ontario) Isabelle Ladouceur 🔨	1	3	0	2	0	2	X	X	8

Sheet 8	1	2	3	4	5	6	7	8	Final
(Ontario) Emma Artichuk 🔨	0	3	0	1	0	0	1	0	5
(United States) Elizabeth Cousins	1	0	0	0	1	1	0	1	4

==== Draw 8 ====
Saturday, September 7, 2:15 pm

Sheet 2	1	2	3	4	5	6	7	8	Final
(Italy) Stefania Constantini 🔨	1	0	2	0	0	1	0	X	4
(Japan) Sayaka Yoshimura	0	4	0	1	1	0	3	X	9

Sheet 7	1	2	3	4	5	6	7	8	Final
(Switzerland) Xenia Schwaller	0	0	0	0	0	0	X	X	0
(Ontario) Danielle Inglis 🔨	0	2	1	1	2	1	X	X	7

==== Draw 9 ====
Saturday, September 7, 4:45 pm

Sheet 1	1	2	3	4	5	6	7	8	Final
(Scotland) Team Morrison 🔨	0	0	2	1	0	2	0	X	5
(Ontario) Isabelle Ladouceur	0	0	0	0	1	0	1	X	2

Sheet 2	1	2	3	4	5	6	7	8	Final
(China) Wang Rui 🔨	2	0	1	0	0	1	0	0	4
(British Columbia) Kayla MacMillan	0	2	0	1	1	0	2	2	8

Sheet 3	1	2	3	4	5	6	7	8	Final
(Quebec) Laurie St-Georges	3	0	1	0	1	0	0	0	5
(Manitoba) Kristy Watling 🔨	0	3	0	1	0	1	1	2	8

Sheet 4	1	2	3	4	5	6	7	8	Final
(Alberta) Kayla Skrlik 🔨	0	1	0	1	3	0	1	1	7
(Ontario) Krysta Burns	1	0	1	0	0	1	0	0	3

Sheet 5	1	2	3	4	5	6	7	8	Final
(Scotland) Fay Henderson 🔨	1	0	1	0	2	0	0	0	4
(Ontario) Breanna Rozon	0	2	0	2	0	0	1	1	6

Sheet 7	1	2	3	4	5	6	7	8	Final
(United States) Delaney Strouse	0	0	2	1	0	1	0	1	5
(Ontario) Emma Artichuk 🔨	0	1	0	0	1	0	2	0	4

Sheet 8	1	2	3	4	5	6	7	8	Final
(South Korea) Ha Seung-youn	0	1	0	3	1	0	3	X	8
(Ontario) Hollie Duncan 🔨	1	0	1	0	0	1	0	X	3

==== Draw 11 ====
Saturday, September 7, 10:30 pm

Sheet 1	1	2	3	4	5	6	7	8	Final
(Switzerland) Corrie Hürlimann	0	1	2	0	1	0	1	1	6
(Ontario) Katie Ford 🔨	0	0	0	1	0	2	0	0	3

Sheet 2	1	2	3	4	5	6	7	8	Final
(Scotland) Team Morrison 🔨	2	0	1	0	2	1	2	X	8
(United States) Delaney Strouse	0	1	0	3	0	0	0	X	4

Sheet 3	1	2	3	4	5	6	7	8	Final
(Ontario) Isabelle Ladouceur 🔨	0	3	1	2	X	X	X	X	6
(Ontario) Emma Artichuk	1	0	0	0	X	X	X	X	1

Sheet 4	1	2	3	4	5	6	7	8	Final
(Ontario) Jessica Corrado	0	1	2	1	0	2	0	0	6
(United States) Elizabeth Cousins 🔨	2	0	0	0	1	0	2	2	7

Sheet 5	1	2	3	4	5	6	7	8	Final
(Quebec) Laurie St-Georges	0	0	3	0	3	3	X	X	9
(Ontario) Krysta Burns 🔨	0	1	0	1	0	0	X	X	2

Sheet 6	1	2	3	4	5	6	7	8	Final
(Manitoba) Kristy Watling	0	0	2	0	X	X	X	X	2
(Alberta) Kayla Skrlik 🔨	3	3	0	2	X	X	X	X	8

Sheet 7	1	2	3	4	5	6	7	8	Final
(Ontario) Breanna Rozon 🔨	0	0	1	0	1	2	0	1	5
(South Korea) Ha Seung-youn	1	0	0	3	0	0	0	0	4

Sheet 8	1	2	3	4	5	6	7	8	Final
(China) Zhang Yujie	0	0	0	2	0	1	0	X	3
(Ontario) Lauren Mann 🔨	0	2	1	0	0	0	5	X	8

==== Draw 13 ====
Sunday, September 8, 1:00 pm

Sheet 1	1	2	3	4	5	6	7	8	Final
(Ontario) Hollie Duncan 🔨	1	0	0	0	0	1	X	X	2
(United States) Elizabeth Cousins	0	2	2	1	2	0	X	X	7

Sheet 2	1	2	3	4	5	6	7	8	Final
(Ontario) Breanna Rozon	0	0	1	1	0	1	0	X	3
(Switzerland) Xenia Schwaller 🔨	3	1	0	0	2	0	1	X	7

Sheet 3	1	2	3	4	5	6	7	8	9	Final
(Alberta) Kayla Skrlik 🔨	1	0	0	1	2	0	2	0	1	7
(China) Wang Rui	0	1	1	0	0	1	0	3	0	6

Sheet 4	1	2	3	4	5	6	7	8	Final
(Switzerland) Corrie Hürlimann	0	0	2	0	2	0	2	0	6
(Manitoba) Kristy Watling 🔨	0	2	0	2	0	3	0	1	8

Sheet 5	1	2	3	4	5	6	7	8	Final
(Ontario) Isabelle Ladouceur 🔨	1	0	0	0	2	0	1	2	6
(South Korea) Ha Seung-youn	0	1	1	0	0	2	0	0	4

Sheet 6	1	2	3	4	5	6	7	8	Final
(Scotland) Team Morrison	1	1	1	0	0	0	0	0	3
(Italy) Stefania Constantini 🔨	0	0	0	2	1	0	1	1	5

Sheet 7	1	2	3	4	5	6	7	8	Final
(Scotland) Fay Henderson 🔨	0	1	0	1	0	0	4	2	8
(Ontario) Lauren Mann	0	0	1	0	1	1	0	0	3

Sheet 8	1	2	3	4	5	6	7	8	Final
(United States) Delaney Strouse	2	0	0	0	1	2	2	X	7
(Quebec) Laurie St-Georges 🔨	0	1	2	1	0	0	0	X	4

==== Draw 14 ====
Sunday, September 8, 3:30 pm

Sheet 7	1	2	3	4	5	6	7	8	Final
(China) Wang Rui 🔨	2	0	2	0	3	1	X	X	8
(United States) Elizabeth Cousins	0	1	0	1	0	0	X	X	2

Sheet 8	1	2	3	4	5	6	7	8	Final
(Scotland) Team Morrison	0	0	3	2	0	0	0	0	5
(Scotland) Fay Henderson 🔨	0	2	0	0	2	1	0	1	6

==== Draw 15 ====
Sunday, September 8, 6:45 pm

Sheet 1	1	2	3	4	5	6	7	8	Final
(United States) Delaney Strouse	0	0	0	1	0	2	1	1	5
(Ontario) Breanna Rozon 🔨	0	1	0	0	2	0	0	0	3

Sheet 8	1	2	3	4	5	6	7	8	Final
(Manitoba) Kristy Watling 🔨	1	0	1	0	1	0	2	0	5
(Ontario) Isabelle Ladouceur	0	2	0	1	0	3	0	1	7

==== Draw 16 ====
Sunday, September 8, 9:15 pm

Sheet 6	1	2	3	4	5	6	7	8	Final
(Scotland) Fay Henderson	0	2	0	0	0	1	1	0	4
(China) Wang Rui 🔨	2	0	1	1	1	0	0	1	6

Sheet 7	1	2	3	4	5	6	7	8	9	Final
(Ontario) Isabelle Ladouceur	0	2	0	1	0	1	0	3	0	7
(United States) Delaney Strouse 🔨	2	0	2	0	0	0	3	0	1	8

=== Playoffs ===
Quarterfinals
1	(Japan) Sayaka Yoshimura	5
8	(United States) Delaney Strouse	6
4	(Alberta) Kayla Skrlik	7
5	(Italy) Stefania Constantini	3
3	(British Columbia) Kayla MacMillan	0
6	(Switzerland) Xenia Schwaller	6
2	(Ontario) Danielle Inglis	1
7	(China) Wang Rui	7

Semifinals
8	(United States) Delaney Strouse	2
4	(Alberta) Kayla Skrlik	7
6	(Switzerland) Xenia Schwaller	5
7	(China) Wang Rui	3

Final
4	(Alberta) Kayla Skrlik	6
6	(Switzerland) Xenia Schwaller	7

==== Quarterfinals ====
Monday, September 9, 8:30 am

Sheet 1	1	2	3	4	5	6	7	8	Final
(Alberta) Kayla Skrlik 🔨	2	0	0	1	1	3	0	X	7
(Italy) Stefania Constantini	0	2	0	0	0	0	1	X	3

Sheet 2	1	2	3	4	5	6	7	8	Final
(Japan) Sayaka Yoshimura 🔨	2	0	2	0	0	0	1	0	5
(United States) Delaney Strouse	0	1	0	3	1	0	0	1	6

Sheet 3	1	2	3	4	5	6	7	8	Final
(British Columbia) Kayla MacMillan 🔨	0	0	0	0	0	0	X	X	0
(Switzerland) Xenia Schwaller	0	0	1	1	3	1	X	X	6

Sheet 4	1	2	3	4	5	6	7	8	Final
(Ontario) Danielle Inglis 🔨	1	0	0	0	0	0	X	X	1
(China) Wang Rui	0	1	1	1	1	3	X	X	7

==== Semifinals ====
Monday, September 9, 12:00 pm

Sheet 5	1	2	3	4	5	6	7	8	Final
(United States) Delaney Strouse	0	1	0	1	0	X	X	X	2
(Alberta) Kayla Skrlik 🔨	3	0	2	0	2	X	X	X	7

Sheet 7	1	2	3	4	5	6	7	8	Final
(Switzerland) Xenia Schwaller 🔨	0	2	0	1	2	0	0	X	5
(China) Wang Rui	0	0	1	0	0	1	1	X	3

==== Final ====
Monday, September 9, 3:15 pm

Sheet 3	1	2	3	4	5	6	7	8	Final
(Alberta) Kayla Skrlik	0	1	0	3	1	0	0	1	6
(Switzerland) Xenia Schwaller 🔨	1	0	2	0	0	1	3	0	7
