= 2018 Newfoundland and Labrador Tankard =

- Host city: St. John's, Newfoundland and Labrador
- Arena: St. John's Curling Club
- Dates: January 29 – February 4
- Winner: Greg Smith
- Curling club: St. John's Curling Club
- Skip: Greg Smith
- Third: Matthew Hunt
- Second: Andrew Taylor
- Lead: Ian Withycombe
- Finalist: Andrew Symonds

The 2018 Newfoundland and Labrador Men's Curling Championship (also known as the Tankard), the men's provincial curling championship for Newfoundland and Labrador, was held from January 29 to February 4 at the St. John's Curling Club in St. John's, Newfoundland and Labrador. The winning Greg Smith team represented Newfoundland and Labrador at the 2018 Tim Hortons Brier at the Brandt Centre in Regina.

It was the first time since 2006 that the event was not won by Brad Gushue, as his team represented Team Canada at the 2018 Brier as defending champions.

== Teams ==
Teams are as follows:

Skip	Third	Second	Lead	Club
Adam Boland	Stephen Trickett	Zach Young	John Sheppard	St. John's Curling Club, St. John's
Paul Harvey	Steve Bragg	Andrew Manuel	Mike Day	St. John's Curling Club, St. John's
Justin Lockyer	Stephen Spratt	Matthew Walsh	Jason Noel	St. John's Curling Club, St. John's
Frank O'Driscoll	Rick Rowsell	Craig Dowden	Ken Peddigrew	St. John's Curling Club, St. John's
Trent Skanes	Nick Lane	Jeff Rose	Mike Mosher	St. John's Curling Club, St. John's
Greg Smith	Matthew Hunt	Andrew Taylor	Ian Withycombe	St. John's Curling Club, St. John's
Andrew Symonds	Mark Healy	David Noftall	Keith Jewer	St. John's Curling Club, St. John's
Colin Thomas	Cory Schuh	Chris Ford	Spencer Wicks	St. John's Curling Club, St. John's
Dave Thomas	David Power	Cody Parsons	Travis Cormier	Gateway Curling Club, Port aux Basques

== Round-robin standings ==
Final round-robin standings

Key
Teams to Playoffs

Skip	W	L
Smith	8	0
Boland	6	2
Symonds	6	2
O'Driscoll	4	4
Harvey	4	4
C. Thomas	3	5
Skanes	3	5
Lockyer	2	6
D. Thomas	0	8

== Round-robin results ==
=== January 29 ===
Draw 1

- Symonds 8-6 C. Thomas
- Harvey 4-10 O'Driscoll
- Smith 11-3 D. Thomas
- Lockyer 1-8 Boland

=== January 30 ===
Draw 2

- Harvey 10-3 Lockyer
- Skanes 4-6 Smith
- Boland 7-4 C. Thomas
- O'Driscoll 10-4 D. Thomas

Draw 3

- Boland 8-4 O'Driscoll
- Lockyer 2-7 Symonds
- Harvey 4-5 Skanes
- Smith 9-7 C. Thomas

=== January 31 ===
Draw 4

- Skanes 3-7 C. Thomas
- Boland 10-2 D. Thomas
- Lockyer 8-5 O'Driscoll
- Harvey 9-10 Symonds

Draw 5

- Harvey 11-4 D. Thomas
- O'Driscoll 8-7 C. Thomas
- Smith 8-6 Symonds
- Lockyer 6-13 Skanes

=== February 1 ===
Draw 6

- O'Driscoll 3-9 Smith
- Skanes 4-7 Symonds
- Boland 7-8 Harvey
- C. Thomas 9-3 D. Thomas

Draw 7

- Boland 7-5 Symonds
- Lockyer 12-8 D. Thomas
- O'Driscoll 10-7 Skanes
- Harvey 10-11 Smith

=== February 2 ===
Draw 8

- Skanes 7-6 D. Thomas
- Boland 8-9 Smith
- Lockyer 3-12 C. Thomas
- O'Driscoll 3-5 Symonds

Draw 9

- Lockyer 2-10 Smith
- Harvey 6-4 C. Thomas
- Symonds 7-5 D. Thomas
- Boland 6-4 Skanes

== Playoffs ==
Due to finishing the round robin undefeated, Smith must be defeated twice.

Semifinal			Final			Final 2
2	Adam Boland	4
3	Andrew Symonds	6	1	Greg Smith	4
			3	Andrew Symonds	9
						1	Greg Smith	9
						3	Andrew Symonds	6

=== Semifinal ===
Team	1	2	3	4	5	6	7	8	9	10	Final
Adam Boland	1	0	0	0	1	0	0	0	2	0	4
Andrew Symonds	0	0	0	1	0	0	3	1	0	1	6

=== Final ===
Team	1	2	3	4	5	6	7	8	9	10	Final
Greg Smith	1	0	1	0	0	1	0	1	0	X	4
Andrew Symonds	0	2	0	2	3	0	1	0	1	X	9

=== Final 2 ===
Team	1	2	3	4	5	6	7	8	9	10	Final
Greg Smith	2	3	0	1	0	2	0	1	0	X	9
Andrew Symonds	0	0	2	0	2	0	1	0	1	X	6

2018 Newfoundland and Labrador Tankard

Greg Smith
1st Newfoundland and Labrador Provincial Championship title
