= 2020 Newfoundland and Labrador Tankard =

- Host city: St. John's, Newfoundland and Labrador
- Arena: RE/MAX Centre
- Dates: January 28 – February 2
- Winner: Team Gushue
- Curling club: Re/Max Centre, St. John's
- Skip: Brad Gushue
- Third: Mark Nichols
- Second: Brett Gallant
- Lead: Geoff Walker
- Finalist: Trent Skanes

The 2020 Newfoundland and Labrador Tankard, the men's provincial curling championship for Newfoundland and Labrador, was held from January 28 to February 2 at the RE/MAX Centre in St. John's. The winning Brad Gushue rink represented Newfoundland and Labrador at the 2020 Tim Hortons Brier, Canada's national men's curling championship in Kingston, Ontario.

Brad Gushue won his fifteenth Newfoundland and Labrador Tankard with a 3–1 victory over Trent Skanes in the final. It was his last provincial championship of his career, as he would automatically qualify for the Brier in subsequent years until his 2026 retirement.

== Teams ==
Two-time Brier champion Brad Gushue returned after missing the previous two Tankards as his team automatically qualified for the Brier as "Team Canada" as defending champions.

Teams are as follows:

Skip	Third	Second	Lead	Alternate	Club
Brad Gushue	Mark Nichols	Brett Gallant	Geoff Walker		Re/Max Centre, St. John's
Mark Noseworthy	Steve Bragg	Andrew Taylor	Steve Routledge		Re/Max Centre, St. John's
Ken Peddigrew	Mark Healy	Evan Kearley	David Noftall		Re/Max Centre, St. John's
Trent Skanes	Cory Schuh	Spencer Wicks	Mike Day	Andrew Manuel	Re/Max Centre, St. John's
Greg Smith	Randy Turpin	John Sheppard	Ian Withycombe		Re/Max Centre, St. John's
Andrew Symonds	Adam Boland	Chris Ford	Keith Jewer		Re/Max Centre, St. John's
Colin Thomas	Stephen Trickett	Zach Young	Michael Mosher		Re/Max Centre, St. John's
Dave Thomas	Travis Cormier	Cody Parsons	Floyd Francis		Gateway Curling Club, Port aux Basques
Nathan Young	Sam Follett	Nathan Locke	Ben Stringer		Re/Max Centre, St. John's

== Round-robin standings ==
Final round-robin standings

Key
Teams to Playoffs

Skip	W	L
Brad Gushue	8	0
Trent Skanes	6	2
Andrew Symonds	5	3
Colin Thomas	5	3
Greg Smith	5	3
Nathan Young	3	5
Mark Noseworthy	2	6
Ken Peddigrew	2	6
Dave Thomas	0	8

== Round-robin results ==
All draws are listed in Newfoundland Time (UTC−03:30).

=== Draw 1 ===
Tuesday, January 28, 11:00 am

Sheet 2	1	2	3	4	5	6	7	8	9	10	Final
Colin Thomas	0	0	0	0	0	1	0	2	0	X	3
Trent Skanes 🔨	0	0	0	3	2	0	1	0	1	X	7

Sheet 3	1	2	3	4	5	6	7	8	9	10	Final
Greg Smith 🔨	0	0	2	0	1	1	0	3	X	X	7
Ken Peddigrew	0	0	0	1	0	0	1	0	X	X	2

Sheet 4	1	2	3	4	5	6	7	8	9	10	Final
Andrew Symonds 🔨	0	0	2	2	1	0	3	0	3	X	11
Dave Thomas	3	1	0	0	0	2	0	2	0	X	8

Sheet 5	1	2	3	4	5	6	7	8	9	10	Final
Mark Noseworthy	0	1	0	0	0	1	X	X	X	X	2
Nathan Young 🔨	1	0	2	2	3	0	X	X	X	X	8

=== Draw 2 ===
Tuesday, January 28, 4:00 pm

Sheet 2	1	2	3	4	5	6	7	8	9	10	Final
Ken Peddigrew	0	1	0	2	1	0	1	1	0	X	6
Nathan Young 🔨	4	0	2	0	0	2	0	0	1	X	9

Sheet 3	1	2	3	4	5	6	7	8	9	10	Final
Andrew Symonds	0	0	0	0	1	0	1	0	0	X	2
Brad Gushue 🔨	0	2	0	0	0	2	0	2	3	X	9

Sheet 4	1	2	3	4	5	6	7	8	9	10	Final
Mark Noseworthy	0	1	0	1	0	1	0	2	0	X	5
Trent Skanes 🔨	1	0	1	0	2	0	2	0	2	X	8

Sheet 5	1	2	3	4	5	6	7	8	9	10	Final
Dave Thomas	0	0	0	1	0	0	1	0	0	X	2
Greg Smith 🔨	1	0	0	0	2	3	0	1	3	X	10

=== Draw 3 ===
Wednesday, January 29, 2:30 pm

Sheet 2	1	2	3	4	5	6	7	8	9	10	Final
Greg Smith	1	1	0	4	2	X	X	X	X	X	8
Mark Noseworthy 🔨	0	0	1	0	0	X	X	X	X	X	1

Sheet 3	1	2	3	4	5	6	7	8	9	10	Final
Colin Thomas 🔨	2	0	0	1	3	2	X	X	X	X	8
Nathan Young	0	0	1	0	0	0	X	X	X	X	1

Sheet 4	1	2	3	4	5	6	7	8	9	10	Final
Brad Gushue	2	1	2	2	0	1	X	X	X	X	8
Ken Peddigrew 🔨	0	0	0	0	1	0	X	X	X	X	1

Sheet 5	1	2	3	4	5	6	7	8	9	10	Final
Andrew Symonds 🔨	0	2	0	0	2	0	0	1	0	X	5
Trent Skanes	0	0	3	1	0	0	2	0	2	X	8

=== Draw 4 ===
Wednesday, January 29, 7:30 pm

Sheet 2	1	2	3	4	5	6	7	8	9	10	Final
Brad Gushue 🔨	2	0	1	0	2	0	0	2	0	X	7
Trent Skanes	0	1	0	1	0	0	1	0	1	X	4

Sheet 3	1	2	3	4	5	6	7	8	9	10	Final
Dave Thomas 🔨	1	0	0	0	1	0	0	1	X	X	3
Mark Noseworthy	0	1	2	1	0	4	1	0	X	X	9

Sheet 4	1	2	3	4	5	6	7	8	9	10	11	Final
Greg Smith 🔨	1	0	1	0	2	0	0	1	1	0	1	7
Nathan Young	0	2	0	0	0	2	0	0	0	2	0	6

Sheet 5	1	2	3	4	5	6	7	8	9	10	Final
Colin Thomas 🔨	1	0	3	0	1	4	0	3	X	X	12
Ken Peddigrew	0	2	0	2	0	0	2	0	X	X	6

=== Draw 5 ===
Thursday, January 30, 2:30 pm

Sheet 2	1	2	3	4	5	6	7	8	9	10	Final
Dave Thomas	0	1	0	0	3	1	1	0	0	X	6
Ken Peddigrew 🔨	1	0	4	3	0	0	0	0	3	X	11

Sheet 3	1	2	3	4	5	6	7	8	9	10	Final
Greg Smith	0	1	0	0	1	0	1	0	1	0	4
Trent Skanes 🔨	0	0	0	0	0	3	0	1	0	2	6

Sheet 4	1	2	3	4	5	6	7	8	9	10	Final
Andrew Symonds	0	0	0	1	0	0	2	0	0	X	3
Colin Thomas 🔨	1	1	1	0	1	1	0	2	0	X	7

Sheet 5	1	2	3	4	5	6	7	8	9	10	Final
Brad Gushue 🔨	1	0	1	1	0	2	0	2	0	X	7
Nathan Young	0	1	0	0	1	0	1	0	1	X	4

=== Draw 6 ===
Thursday, January 30, 7:30 pm

Sheet 2	1	2	3	4	5	6	7	8	9	10	Final
Andrew Symonds	0	1	0	1	0	0	1	0	0	X	3
Greg Smith 🔨	2	0	1	0	0	1	0	3	1	X	8

Sheet 3	1	2	3	4	5	6	7	8	9	10	Final
Colin Thomas	0	0	1	0	0	X	X	X	X	X	1
Brad Gushue 🔨	2	1	0	0	6	X	X	X	X	X	9

Sheet 4	1	2	3	4	5	6	7	8	9	10	Final
Ken Peddigrew	1	0	0	1	0	0	3	0	1	0	6
Mark Noseworthy 🔨	0	2	1	0	0	1	0	3	0	2	9

Sheet 5	1	2	3	4	5	6	7	8	9	10	Final
Dave Thomas	0	1	0	0	0	0	X	X	X	X	1
Trent Skanes 🔨	2	0	1	2	0	3	X	X	X	X	8

=== Draw 7 ===
Friday, January 31, 2:30 pm

Sheet 2	1	2	3	4	5	6	7	8	9	10	11	Final
Colin Thomas	0	2	0	2	0	0	2	0	2	0	1	9
Mark Noseworthy 🔨	1	0	1	0	1	1	0	3	0	1	0	8

Sheet 3	1	2	3	4	5	6	7	8	9	10	Final
Dave Thomas	0	1	0	1	0	0	1	0	2	0	5
Nathan Young 🔨	1	0	1	0	0	3	0	1	0	1	7

Sheet 4	1	2	3	4	5	6	7	8	9	10	Final
Greg Smith	0	0	0	0	X	X	X	X	X	X	0
Brad Gushue 🔨	0	0	5	3	X	X	X	X	X	X	8

Sheet 5	1	2	3	4	5	6	7	8	9	10	Final
Andrew Symonds	0	2	2	0	0	3	0	2	X	X	9
Ken Peddigrew 🔨	1	0	0	1	0	0	1	0	X	X	3

=== Draw 8 ===
Friday, January 31, 7:30 pm

Sheet 2	1	2	3	4	5	6	7	8	9	10	Final
Dave Thomas	0	1	1	0	0	X	X	X	X	X	2
Brad Gushue 🔨	4	0	0	3	3	X	X	X	X	X	10

Sheet 3	1	2	3	4	5	6	7	8	9	10	Final
Andrew Symonds	0	0	1	0	1	0	2	0	2	1	7
Mark Noseworthy 🔨	0	2	0	0	0	1	0	1	0	0	4

Sheet 4	1	2	3	4	5	6	7	8	9	10	Final
Nathan Young	0	0	0	1	0	2	1	0	2	X	6
Trent Skanes 🔨	0	0	4	0	3	0	0	1	0	X	8

Sheet 5	1	2	3	4	5	6	7	8	9	10	Final
Colin Thomas 🔨	2	2	0	0	0	2	0	2	1	X	9
Greg Smith	0	0	2	2	0	0	1	0	0	X	5

=== Draw 9 ===
Saturday, February 1, 9:30 am

Sheet 2	1	2	3	4	5	6	7	8	9	10	Final
Andrew Symonds 🔨	0	2	0	1	0	2	0	3	X	X	8
Nathan Young	0	0	2	0	1	0	1	0	X	X	4

Sheet 3	1	2	3	4	5	6	7	8	9	10	Final
Trent Skanes	0	2	0	1	0	1	0	0	2	0	6
Ken Peddigrew 🔨	1	0	1	0	3	0	1	1	0	1	8

Sheet 4	1	2	3	4	5	6	7	8	9	10	Final
Dave Thomas	0	0	1	0	1	0	0	X	X	X	2
Colin Thomas 🔨	1	2	0	1	0	0	5	X	X	X	9

Sheet 5	1	2	3	4	5	6	7	8	9	10	Final
Mark Noseworthy 🔨	1	0	0	2	0	0	0	0	1	X	4
Brad Gushue	0	0	1	0	4	1	1	0	0	X	7

=== Tiebreakers ===
Saturday, February 1, 2:30 pm

Sheet 3	1	2	3	4	5	6	7	8	9	10	Final
Greg Smith	0	1	0	2	0	0	0	0	2	0	5
Colin Thomas 🔨	0	0	1	0	2	0	0	1	0	2	6

Saturday, February 1, 7:30 pm

Sheet 3	1	2	3	4	5	6	7	8	9	10	Final
Andrew Symonds 🔨	0	0	2	0	0	2	0	1	1	X	6
Colin Thomas	0	1	0	0	2	0	0	0	0	X	3

== Playoffs ==
Semifinal			Final
			1	Brad Gushue	3
2	Trent Skanes	5	2	Trent Skanes	1
3	Andrew Symonds	4

=== Semifinal ===
Sunday, February 2, 8:00 am

Sheet 4	1	2	3	4	5	6	7	8	9	10	Final
Trent Skanes 🔨	0	1	0	0	2	0	1	0	0	1	5
Andrew Symonds	0	0	0	2	0	1	0	1	0	0	4

=== Final ===
Sunday, February 2, 1:00 pm

Sheet 4	1	2	3	4	5	6	7	8	9	10	Final
Brad Gushue 🔨	0	1	0	1	0	0	0	0	0	1	3
Trent Skanes	0	0	0	0	1	0	0	0	0	0	1

2020 Newfoundland & Labrador Tankard
(Newfoundland and Labrador)
Brad Gushue
15th Newfoundland & Labrador Provincial Championship title
