= Greg Smith (curler) =

Canadian curler

- Curler
- Born: June 18, 1996 (age 30); St. John's, Newfoundland and Labrador

Team
- Curling club: RE/MAX Centre & Bally Haly CC, St. John's, NL
- Skip: Greg Smith
- Third: Carter Small
- Second: Nate Locke
- Lead: Ben Stringer
- Mixed doubles partner: Jessica Wiseman

Curling career
- Member Association: Newfoundland and Labrador
- Brier: 2 (2018, 2021)
- Top CTRS ranking: 41st (2023–24)

Gregory Smith (born June 18, 1996) is a Canadian curler from St. John's, Newfoundland and Labrador. He currently skips his own team out of the RE/MAX Centre.

== Career ==
Smith skipped Team Newfoundland and Labrador at two consecutive Canadian Junior Curling Championships in 2015 and 2016 with his team of Ryan McNeil Lamswood, Kyle Barron and Craig Laing. In 2015, they had a 3–6 eleventh-place finish and in 2016, they finished in ninth with a 5–4 record. While still in juniors, Smith and his team played in the 2015 GSOC Tour Challenge Tier 2 which was held in Paradise, Newfoundland and Labrador. There, they finished with a winless 0–4 record.

Smith played in his first Newfoundland and Labrador Tankard in 2018 with his new team of Matthew Hunt, Andrew Taylor and Ian Withycombe. The team had a successful tournament, finishing the round robin with a perfect 8–0 and defeating Andrew Symonds 9–6 in the final to claim the provincial title. Representing Newfoundland and Labrador at the 2018 Tim Hortons Brier, they finished with a 1–7 record, only defeating Yukon's Thomas Scoffin. The team could not defend their provincial title the following season, losing out in the C Event quarterfinals.

During the 2019–20 season, Smith competed in his second Grand Slam of Curling event at the 2019 Tour Challenge Tier 2 in Westville Road, Nova Scotia, where he once again finished 0–4. At the 2020 Newfoundland and Labrador Tankard, his team lost in a tiebreaker to Colin Thomas.

Smith won his second provincial championship in 2021 at the 2021 Newfoundland and Labrador Tankard, defeating Colin Thomas 9–8 in a double extra end. He improved his record from 2018 at the 2021 Tim Hortons Brier, finishing with a 2–6 record. Also in 2021, Smith competed in the 2021 Canadian Mixed Doubles Curling Championship with partner Mackenzie Mitchell. The duo finished 4–2 in the round robin, qualifying Newfoundland and Labrador for the playoffs for the first time in the event's history. They then lost in the round of 12 qualifying round to Kadriana Sahaidak and Colton Lott, officially eliminating them from the tournament.

== Politics ==
Outside of curling, Smith ran for a seat on St. John's City Council in a by-election in 2020 in Ward 2. He ended up placing fourth with 586 votes (11%). Smith ran for an at-large council seat on the St. John's City Council in the 2021 municipal election. Smith was unsuccessful, placing seventh. Smith supported Jean Charest in the 2022 Conservative Party of Canada leadership election. Smith initially supported Eugene Manning in the 2023 provincial PC party leadership race before withdrawing his support due to Manning's support of the Conservative Party of Canada. In 2024, Smith announced his candidacy for the Ward 4 municipal by-election. Smith failed to win the election, placing third out of the four candidates, winning 650 votes (23.3%). Smith ran again for a seat on St. John's City Council in the 2025 municipal elections. Running in Ward 2, he won 30% of the vote, finishing second behind Brenda Halley.

== Personal life ==
Smith works as the curling coordinator and an instructor at the Bally Haly Curling Club. He previously attended Booth Memorial High School. He is pansexual.

== Teams ==
Season	Skip	Third	Second	Lead	Alternate
2013–14	Greg Smith	Ryan McNeil Lamswood	Kyle Barron	Craig Laing	
2014–15	Greg Smith	Ryan McNeil Lamswood	Kyle Barron	Craig Laing	
2015–16	Greg Smith	Ryan McNeil Lamswood	Kyle Barron	Craig Laing	
2016–17	Greg Smith	Kyle Barron	Zac Payne	Craig Laing	
2017–18	Greg Smith	Matthew Hunt	Andrew Taylor	Ian Withycombe	
2018–19	Greg Smith	Nicholas Bissonnette	John Sheppard	Ian Withycombe	
2019–20	Greg Smith	Randy Turpin	John Sheppard	Ian Withycombe	
2020–21	Greg Smith	Greg Blyde	Alex McDonah	Evan McDonah	
2021–22	Greg Smith	Greg Blyde	Carter Small	Alex McDonah	
2022–23	Greg Smith	Adam Boland	Chris Ford	Zach Young	Greg Blyde
2023–24	Greg Smith	Chris Ford	Zach Young	Zack Shurtleff	
2024–25	Greg Smith	Chris Ford	Zach Young	Zack Shurtleff	Carter Small
2025–26	Greg Smith	Carter Small	Scott Saccary	Sean O'Leary	
2026–27	Greg Smith	Carter Small	Nate Locke	Ben Stringer	

== Electoral record ==
Ward 2, 2025
Brenda Halley	2,525	48.13
Greg Smith	1,567	29.87
Todd Perrin	471	8.98
Blair Trainor	305	5.81
Greg Dunne	286	5.45
Philip Barton	92	1.75

By-election March 12, 2024, Ward 4	Vote	%
Tom Davis	1,211	43.41
Myles Russell	657	23.55
Greg Smith	650	23.30
Nicholas Hillier	272	9.75

At-large, 2021
Maggie Burton (X)	16,851	14.74
Sandy Hickman (X)	12,992	11.36
Ron Ellsworth	12,933	11.31
Debbie Hanlon (X)	12,179	10.65
Meghan Hollett	11,887	10.40
Jess Puddister	11,487	10.05
Greg Smith	11,330	9.91
Anne Malone	6,856	6.00
Tom Davis	6,650	5.82
Mark House	4,479	3.92
Paul Combden	3,696	3.23
Steve Parsons	2,206	1.93
Raymond Petten	770	0.67

By-election October 20, 2020, Ward 2	Vote	%
Shawn Skinner	1,242	22.88
Ophelia Ravencroft	936	17.24
Lorne Loder	923	17.00
Greg Smith	586	10.79
Carol Anne Furlong	570	10.50
Matt House	480	8.84
Greg Noseworthy	470	8.66
Wallace Ryan	222	4.09
